= List of Michelin-starred restaurants in Ireland =

As of the 2026 guide, there are 23 restaurants in the Republic of Ireland with a Michelin-star rating, a rating system used by the Michelin Guide to grade restaurants based on their quality.

The Michelin Guide has been published for the island of Ireland (Note: This includes both the Republic of Ireland and Northern Ireland) since 1974.

The Michelin Guides have been published by the French tyre company Michelin since 1900. They were designed as a guide to tell drivers about eateries they recommended to visit and to subtly sponsor their tyres, by encouraging drivers to use their cars more and therefore need to replace the tyres as they wore out. Over time, the stars that were given out started to become more valuable.

Multiple anonymous Michelin inspectors visit the restaurants several times. They rate the restaurants on five criteria: "quality of products", "mastery of flavor and cooking techniques", "the personality of the chef represented in the dining experience", "value for money", and "consistency between inspectors' visits". Inspectors have at least ten years of expertise and create a list of popular restaurants supported by media reports, reviews, and diner popularity. If they reach a consensus, Michelin awards restaurants from one to three stars based on its evaluation methodology: One star means "high-quality cooking, worth a stop", two stars signify "excellent cooking, worth a detour", and three stars denote "exceptional cuisine, worth a special journey". The stars are not permanent and restaurants are constantly being re-evaluated. If the criteria are not met, the restaurant will lose its stars.

== List ==
=== 2020–2026 ===
Key
1 Michelin star	One Michelin star
2 Michelin stars	Two Michelin stars
—	The restaurant did not receive a star that year
Closed	The restaurant is no longer open

Michelin-starred restaurants
Name	Cuisine	Location	2020	2021	2022	2023	2024	2025	2026
Aimsir	Irish	Lyons Estate	2 Michelin stars	2 Michelin stars	2 Michelin stars	2 Michelin stars	—	Closed	
Aniar	Irish	Galway	1 Michelin star	1 Michelin star	1 Michelin star	1 Michelin star	1 Michelin star	1 Michelin star	1 Michelin star
Ballyfin	Modern	Ballyfin	—	—	—	—	—	1 Michelin star	1 Michelin star
Bastible	Irish	Dublin	—	—	1 Michelin star	1 Michelin star	1 Michelin star	1 Michelin star	1 Michelin star
Bastion	European	Kinsale	1 Michelin star	1 Michelin star	1 Michelin star	1 Michelin star	1 Michelin star	1 Michelin star	1 Michelin star
The Bishop's Buttery	Modern	Cashel	—	—	—	—	1 Michelin star	1 Michelin star	1 Michelin star
Campagne	French	Kilkenny	1 Michelin star	1 Michelin star	1 Michelin star	1 Michelin star	1 Michelin star	1 Michelin star	1 Michelin star
Chapter One	European	Dublin	1 Michelin star	1 Michelin star	2 Michelin stars	2 Michelin stars	2 Michelin stars	2 Michelin stars	2 Michelin stars
Restaurant Chestnut	Irish	Ballydehob	1 Michelin star	1 Michelin star	1 Michelin star	1 Michelin star	1 Michelin star	1 Michelin star	1 Michelin star
Dede	Turkish	Baltimore	—	1 Michelin star	1 Michelin star	2 Michelin stars	2 Michelin stars	2 Michelin stars	2 Michelin stars
D'Olier Street	Fusion	Dublin	—	—	—	—	1 Michelin star	1 Michelin star	1 Michelin star
L'Ecrivain	Irish and French	Dublin	1 Michelin star	Closed					
Forest Avenue	Modern	Dublin	—	—	—	—	—	—	1 Michelin star
Glovers Alley	Modern	Dublin	—	—	1 Michelin star	1 Michelin star	1 Michelin star	1 Michelin star	1 Michelin star
The Greenhouse	Modern	Dublin	2 Michelin stars	2 Michelin stars	Temporarily Closed				
Lady Helen Restaurant	Modern	Thomastown	1 Michelin star	1 Michelin star	1 Michelin star	1 Michelin star	1 Michelin star	1 Michelin star	1 Michelin star
Liath (Note: Continuation of Heron and Grey)	Creative	Dublin	1 Michelin star	1 Michelin star	2 Michelin stars	2 Michelin stars	2 Michelin stars	2 Michelin stars	2 Michelin stars
LIGИUM	Creative	Bullaun	—	—	—	—	—	1 Michelin star	1 Michelin star
Homestead Cottage	Irish	Doolin	—	—	—	—	1 Michelin star	1 Michelin star	1 Michelin star
The House (Note: Part of Cliff House Hotel)	Irish	Ardmore	1 Michelin star	1 Michelin star	1 Michelin star	1 Michelin star	1 Michelin star	1 Michelin star	1 Michelin star
Ichigo Ichie	Japanese	Cork	1 Michelin star	1 Michelin star	1 Michelin star	1 Michelin star	—	—	—
Loam	Irish	Galway	1 Michelin star	1 Michelin star	1 Michelin star	Closed			
The Morrison Room	Modern	Maynooth	—	—	—	—	—	1 Michelin star	1 Michelin star
The Oak Room	Modern	Adare	1 Michelin star	1 Michelin star	1 Michelin star	1 Michelin star	1 Michelin star	1 Michelin star	1 Michelin star
Restaurant Patrick Guilbaud	French	Dublin	2 Michelin stars	2 Michelin stars	2 Michelin stars	2 Michelin stars	2 Michelin stars	2 Michelin stars	2 Michelin stars
Terre	Modern	Castlemartyr	—	—	—	1 Michelin star	2 Michelin stars	2 Michelin stars	2 Michelin stars
The Pullman	Modern	Galway	—	—	—	—	—	—	1 Michelin star
Variety Jones	Modern	Dublin	1 Michelin star	1 Michelin star	1 Michelin star	1 Michelin star	1 Michelin star	1 Michelin star	1 Michelin star
Wild Honey Inn	Bistronomy	Lisdoonvarna	1 Michelin star	1 Michelin star	1 Michelin star	1 Michelin star	1 Michelin star	—	—
Reference									

=== 2010–2019 ===
Key
1 Michelin star	One Michelin star
2 Michelin stars	Two Michelin stars
—	The restaurant did not receive a star that year
Closed	The restaurant is no longer open

Michelin-starred restaurants
Name	Location	2010	2011	2012	2013	2014	2015	2016	2017	2018	2019
Restaurant Patrick Guilbaud	Dublin	2 Michelin stars	2 Michelin stars	2 Michelin stars	2 Michelin stars	2 Michelin stars	2 Michelin stars	2 Michelin stars	2 Michelin stars	2 Michelin stars	2 Michelin stars
Aniar	Galway	—	—	—	1 Michelin star	1 Michelin star	1 Michelin star	1 Michelin star	1 Michelin star	1 Michelin star	1 Michelin star
Bon Appétit	Malahide	1 Michelin star	1 Michelin star	1 Michelin star	1 Michelin star	1 Michelin star	1 Michelin star	—	—	—	—
Campagne	Kilkenny	—	—	—	—	1 Michelin star	1 Michelin star	1 Michelin star	1 Michelin star	1 Michelin star	1 Michelin star
Chapter One	Dublin	1 Michelin star	1 Michelin star	1 Michelin star	1 Michelin star	1 Michelin star	1 Michelin star	1 Michelin star	1 Michelin star	1 Michelin star	1 Michelin star
Restaurant Chestnut	Ballydehob	—	—	—	—	—	—	—	—	—	1 Michelin star
L'Ecrivain	Dublin	1 Michelin star	1 Michelin star	1 Michelin star	1 Michelin star	1 Michelin star	1 Michelin star	1 Michelin star	1 Michelin star	1 Michelin star	1 Michelin star
The Greenhouse	Dublin	—	—	—	—	—	—	1 Michelin star	1 Michelin star	1 Michelin star	1 Michelin star
Lady Helen Restaurant	Thomastown	—	—	—	—	1 Michelin star	1 Michelin star	1 Michelin star	1 Michelin star	1 Michelin star	1 Michelin star
Heron and Grey	Dublin	—	—	—	—	—	—	—	1 Michelin star	1 Michelin star	1 Michelin star
The House (Cliff House Hotel)	Ardmore	1 Michelin star	1 Michelin star	1 Michelin star	1 Michelin star	1 Michelin star	1 Michelin star	1 Michelin star	1 Michelin star	1 Michelin star	1 Michelin star
Ichigo Ichie	Cork	—	—	—	—	—	—	—	—	—	1 Michelin star
Loam	Galway	—	—	—	—	—	—	1 Michelin star	1 Michelin star	1 Michelin star	1 Michelin star
Locks Brasserie	Dublin	—	—	—	1 Michelin star	—	Closed				
Mews	Baltimore	—	—	—	—	—	—	—	—	—	1 Michelin star
Thornton's (Fitzwilliam Hotel)	Dublin	1 Michelin star	1 Michelin star	1 Michelin star	1 Michelin star	1 Michelin star	1 Michelin star	Closed			
Wild Honey Inn	Lisdoonvarna	—	—	—	—	—	—	—	1 Michelin star	1 Michelin star	1 Michelin star
Reference											

=== 2000–2009 ===
Key
1 Michelin star	One Michelin star
2 Michelin stars	Two Michelin stars
—	The restaurant did not receive a star that year
Closed	The restaurant is no longer open

Michelin-starred restaurants
Name	Location	2000	2001	2002	2003	2004	2005	2006	2007	2008	2009
Restaurant Patrick Guilbaud	Dublin	2 Michelin stars	2 Michelin stars	2 Michelin stars	2 Michelin stars	2 Michelin stars	2 Michelin stars	2 Michelin stars	2 Michelin stars	2 Michelin stars	2 Michelin stars
Thornton's	Dublin	1 Michelin star	2 Michelin stars	2 Michelin stars	—	—	—	—	—	—	—
Thornton's (Fitzwilliam Hotel)	Dublin	—	—	—	2 Michelin stars	2 Michelin stars	2 Michelin stars	1 Michelin star	1 Michelin star	1 Michelin star	1 Michelin star
Bon Appétit	Malahide	—	—	—	—	—	—	—	—	1 Michelin star	1 Michelin star
Chapter One	Dublin	—	—	—	—	—	—	—	1 Michelin star	1 Michelin star	1 Michelin star
Erriseask House	Ballyconneely	1 Michelin star	1 Michelin star	Closed							
L'Ecrivain	Dublin	—	—	—	1 Michelin star	1 Michelin star	1 Michelin star	1 Michelin star	1 Michelin star	1 Michelin star	1 Michelin star
Mint	Ranelagh	—	—	—	—	—	—	—	—	1 Michelin star	1 Michelin star
Peacock Alley (Fitzwilliam Hotel)	Dublin	1 Michelin star	1 Michelin star	1 Michelin star	Closed						
Shiro	Ahakista	1 Michelin star	1 Michelin star	Closed							
The Commons Restaurant	Dublin	—	—	1 Michelin star	Closed						

=== 1990–1999 ===
Key
1 Michelin star	One Michelin star
2 Michelin stars	Two Michelin stars
—	The restaurant did not receive a star that year

Michelin-starred restaurants
Name	Location	1990	1991	1992	1993	1994	1995	1996	1997	1998	1999
Restaurant Patrick Guilbaud	Dublin	1 Michelin star	1 Michelin star	1 Michelin star	1 Michelin star	1 Michelin star	1 Michelin star	2 Michelin stars	2 Michelin stars	2 Michelin stars	2 Michelin stars
Dromoland Castle	Newmarket-on-Fergus	—	—	—	—	—	1 Michelin star	—	—	—	—
Kildare Hotel & Country Club	Straffan	—	—	—	1 Michelin star	1 Michelin star	—	—	—	—	—
Park (Park Hotel)	Kenmare	1 Michelin star	—	—	—	1 Michelin star	1 Michelin star	1 Michelin star	1 Michelin star	1 Michelin star	1 Michelin star
Peacock Alley	Dublin	—	—	—	—	—	—	—	—	1 Michelin star	—
Peacock Alley (Fitzwilliam Hotel)	Dublin	—	—	—	—	—	—	—	—	—	1 Michelin star
Sheen Falls Lodge	Kenmare	—	—	—	1 Michelin star	1 Michelin star	1 Michelin star	1 Michelin star	1 Michelin star	1 Michelin star	—
Shiro	Ahakista	—	—	—	—	—	—	1 Michelin star	1 Michelin star	1 Michelin star	1 Michelin star
The Commons Restaurant	Dublin	—	—	—	—	1 Michelin star	1 Michelin star	1 Michelin star	1 Michelin star	—	—
Thornton's	Dublin	—	—	—	—	—	—	1 Michelin star	1 Michelin star	1 Michelin star	1 Michelin star

=== 1980–1989 ===
Key
1 Michelin star	One Michelin star
—	The restaurant did not receive a star that year

Michelin-starred restaurants
Name	Location	1980	1981	1982	1983	1984	1985	1986	1987	1988	1989
Arbutus Lodge	Cork	1 Michelin star	1 Michelin star	1 Michelin star	1 Michelin star	—	—	—	1 Michelin star	1 Michelin star	—
Ballymaloe House	Shanagarry	1 Michelin star	—	—	—	—	—	—	—	—	—
Cashel Palace Hotel	Cashel	—	—	1 Michelin star	1 Michelin star	—	—	—	—	—	—
Chez Hans	Cashel	—	—	—	1 Michelin star	—	—	—	—	—	—
Dunderry Lodge	Navan	—	—	—	—	—	—	1 Michelin star	1 Michelin star	1 Michelin star	1 Michelin star
Park (Park Hotel)	Kenmare	—	—	—	1 Michelin star	1 Michelin star	1 Michelin star	1 Michelin star	1 Michelin star	1 Michelin star	1 Michelin star

=== 1974–1979 ===
There were no stars awarded before 1974, this was the first year Michelin Guide awarded restaurants in Ireland and the United Kingdom.

Key
1 Michelin star	One Michelin star
—	The restaurant did not receive a star that year
Closed	The restaurant is no longer open

Michelin-starred restaurants
Name	Location	1974	1975	1976	1977	1978	1979
Armstrong's Barn	Annamoe	—	—	—	—	1 Michelin star	—
Arbutus Lodge	Cork	1 Michelin star	1 Michelin star	1 Michelin star	1 Michelin star	1 Michelin star	1 Michelin star
Ballylickey House	Ballylickey	—	1 Michelin star	—	—	—	—
Ballymaloe House	Shanagarry	—	1 Michelin star	1 Michelin star	1 Michelin star	1 Michelin star	1 Michelin star
The Russell Hotel	Dublin	1 Michelin star	Closed				

== See also ==
- List of Michelin 3-star restaurants
- List of Michelin 3-star restaurants in the United Kingdom
- List of Michelin-starred restaurants in Northern Ireland
- List of Michelin-starred restaurants in Scotland
- List of Michelin-starred restaurants in Wales
