= Rory Carville =

Irish michelin-starred head chef

- Occupation: Head chef
- Known for: Michelin starred Locks Brasserie

Rory Carville (Castleblayney, County Monaghan) is an Irish Michelin-starred head chef formerly with restaurant Locks Brasserie in Dublin.

Carville studied at the Killybegs Catering College. He has previously worked at the Four Seasons Hotel Dublin under chef Terry White and L'Ecrivain under chef Derry Clarke. Afterwards, he worked with Sébastien Masi at his Pearl Brasserie, before he was appointed as head chef of Locks Brasserie. He left the restaurant in July 2013 to open a new restaurant in the Clarence Hotel, together with Oliver Dunne.

== Awards ==
- 2012: Michelin star
