= Michael Bolster =

Irish head chef

- Born: 1967; County Cork
- Occupation: Chef
- Known for: Michelin star

Michael Bolster (born 1967) is an Irish head chef. He was the head chef of the Michelin starred restaurant The Commons Restaurant on St. Stephen's Green in Dublin, Ireland. He was responsible for retaining the star in 1995. The cooking style of Bolster is described as modern food with classical references, using speciality Irish ingredients enhanced by traditional French produce.

== Career ==
Michael Bolster trained in Great Britain. Later he worked at Adare Manor, where he worked under head chef Ian McAndrew. He was sous-chef under Gerry Kirwan in "The Commons Restaurant" when it earned its Michelin star and was later promoted to head chef. After retaining the star he left The Commons and moved to the Cashel Palace Hotel.

== Awards ==
- Michelin star 1995 - The Commons Restaurant
- AA Rosettes 2008 - The Brehon Hotel
