= Declan Ryan (chef) =

Declan Ryan (Cork, 1943) is a former chef, manager and hotel-owner in Cork, Ireland. In the period 1971–1999 he and his family were owners of the Michelin star winning Arbutus Lodge. From 1999 he is owner of Arbutus Breads.

Declan Ryan earned Michelin stars in the periods 1974–1983 and 1986–1987 in Arbutus Lodge and in 1982 & 1983 in the Cashel Palace Hotel.

Ryan studied hotel management at Hendon College of Technology in London. Later he trained in The Russell Hotel.

Declan Ryan did a part of his chef training abroad, working in France with Paul Bocuse in Lyon and the Troisgros family in Roanne.

He was manager of Arbutus Lodge in the periods 1964–1979 and 1982–1999. He managed Cashel Palace Hotel in 1980 and 1981.

In 1986 Declan Ryan was, together with Myrtle Allen, one of the founders of the Irish branch of Euro-toques, an organisation for chefs and cooks that works to protect and pass on local culinary traditions as part of the cultural heritage.

After the closure of Arbutus Lodge and the start of Arbutus Breads he started training again. This time at the "Ecole Francaise de Boulangerie d’Aurillac" to perfect his baking skills.

In 2009 he acted as juror for "The Grow Bake Cook Award", a competition for non-profession chefs in Cork.

== Personal ==
Declan Ryan is married to Patsy Ryan, and has five children: Adrian Ryan, Fiona Ryan, Stephen Ryan, Darragh Ryan, and Anna Ryan. Michael Ryan is the younger brother of Declan Ryan.

== Awards ==
- Michelin Star Arbutus Lodge: 1974–1983 & 1986–1987
- Michelin Star Cashel Palace Hotel: 1982–1983
- Elected to La Confrerie De La Boulangerie Du Cantal 2000
- Member Bread Bakers Guild of America
- Elected Associate member Richmont Club of Ireland 2002
- Eurotoques Award for Artisan Bread 2002
