= Lignum =

Lignum may refer to:

- Lignum, common name of Duma florulenta, plant native to inland Australia
- Lignum (restaurant), in County Galway, Ireland
- Lignum, Virginia, unincorporated community in the United States
- Lignum Ltd, a Canadian forest product company; see John C. Kerr

== See also ==
- Gmelina lignum-vitreum, plant endemic to New Caledonia
- Lignin
- Lignum vitae, trade wood from trees of the genus Guaiacum
- Lignumvitae Key, island in the Florida Keys
- Vitex lignum-vitae, Australian rainforest tree
