= Ultan =

- Gender: Male

Origin
- Meaning: Ulsterman
- Region of origin: Ireland

Ultan (Irish: Ultán) is an Irish male given name derived from Ulster.

== People with the given name ==
- Saint Ultan, Irish monk and saint
- Ultan of Ardbraccan, Irish abbot and saint
- Ultan Cooke, Irish chef
- Ultan Conlon, Irish singer-songwriter
- Ultan Dillane, Irish professional rugby player
- Ultán Heenan-Roberts, Irish Footballer

== People with the surname ==
- Lloyd Ultan (composer)
- Lloyd Ultan (historian)

== See also ==
- Owltan, a village in Ardabil Province, Iran
