= La Cascade =

Coordinates: 51°52′32.99″N 9°33′34.32″W

- Interactive map of La Cascade

Restaurant information
- Established: 1991-2018
- Head chef: Heiko Reibandt
- Food type: Modern Irish
- Rating: Michelin Guide
- Location: Kenmare, County Kerry, Ireland
- Website: Official website

La Cascade was the previous restaurant of Sheen Falls Lodge, a hotel outside the town of Kenmare, County Kerry, Ireland. It is a fine-dining restaurant that was awarded one Michelin star each year in the period 1993 to 1998.

During the period the restaurant was awarded the Michelin star, the head chef was Fergus Moore.

The restaurant changed name to The Falls in 2018 when it and the hotel changed ownership.

== House ==
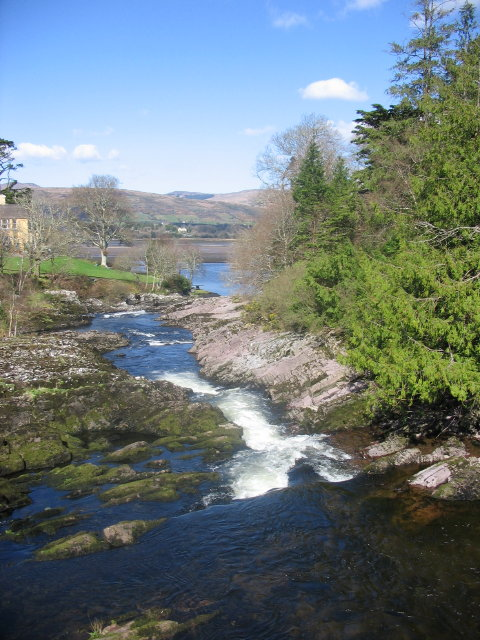
View from the bridge over the Falls at Sheen Falls Lodge towards Kenmare River

The site of the present-day hotel Sheen Falls Lodge and thus La Cascade was originally occupied by an old farm house, Sheen Cottage, as early as 1764. It belonged to the Irish estate of the Marquess of Lansdowne.

In 1777 a still-existing bridge was built over the falls next to the house. During the nineteenth century, the house and the grounds surrounding it were leased by different gentlemen. In 1854 Frederick Trench, 2nd Baron Ashtown purchased the lease from George Woodhouse. Ashtown invested £ 1.000 in building a new fishing lodge, which incorporated the walls of the smaller Sheen Cottage as its southern part. Ashtown spent little time there but sublet to various tenants.

In 1879 Henry Petty-Fitzmaurice, 5th Marquess of Lansdowne bought the residue of his lease. Thereafter the Lansdowne family used it as a hunting and fishing lodge. In 1948, Lord Bruntisfield bought the site and largely rebuilt the house before selling it again in 1962.

In 1966 the estate passed into the ownership of a Manchester business man, who tried to turn Sheen Falls into a commercial fishery. Without success, he sold the property to an international corporation, from which it was purchased by the Danish-born entrepreneur Bent Christian Høyer in 1988. He started with the construction of the 5-star hotel Sheen Falls Lodge, which was opened in 1991. In February 2013 the hotel was bought by the international hotel group Palladian Hotels and Resorts for €5 million.

== See also ==
- List of Michelin starred restaurants in Ireland
