= Ichigo =

Ichigo is the Japanese word for strawberry (イチゴ, 苺).

Ichigo may also refer to:

== People ==
- Ichigo Rinahamu, Japanese idol, current member of CY8ER
- Ichigo Takano, Japanese manga artist

=== Fictional characters ===
- Ichigo, character in Darling in the Franxx
- Ichigo Amano, main character in Yumeiro Patissiere
- Ichigo Hoshimiya, main character in Aikatsu!
- Kamen Raidā Ichigō or Kamen Rider 1 (a.k.a Takeshi Hongo), main character in Kamen Rider
- Ichigo Kurosaki, main character in Bleach
- Ichigo Minase, character in Heaven Burns Red
- Ichigo Moesaki, character in Seiyu's Life!
- Ichigo Momomiya, main character in Tokyo Mew Mew
- Ichigo Morino, character in Please Teacher!
- Ichigo Saitō, a character in manga and anime series Oshi no Ko

== Media ==
- Ichigo 100% or Strawberry 100%, a Japanese media franchise
- Ichigo Mashimaro or Strawberry Marshmallow, a Japanese media franchise
- Strawberry Newspaper (いちご新聞, Ichigo Shimbun), a monthly publication of Sanrio

== Other uses ==
Ichi-go is also the Japanese word for "one's lifetime" (いちご, 一期)

- Ichi-go ichi-e, a Japanese expression that has been translated as "for this time only", and "once in a lifetime".
- Ichigo Ichie, Japanese kaiseki restaurant
- Ichigo Inc., a Japanese sustainable infrastructure company
- Operation Ichi-Go (also known as Ichigo Offensive), a military operation in World War II
- Ichigo, a fictional video game in the novel Tomorrow, and Tomorrow, and Tomorrow (novel)
