= R350 road =

R350 road may refer to:

- R350 road (Ireland)
- R350 road (South Africa)
