= Shiro (restaurant) =

Coordinates: 51°35′58.29″N 9°37′50.36″W

- Interactive map of Shiro

Restaurant information
- Closed: 2001
- Head chef: Kei Pilz
- Food type: Japanese and Sushi
- Location: Ahakista, County Cork, Ireland
- Seating capacity: 18

Shiro was a restaurant in Ahakista, County Cork, Ireland. It was a fine dining restaurant that was awarded one Michelin star each year in the period 1996–2001.

The kitchen style was Japanese and Sushi.

The restaurant had only a short menu, no staff (the owners were also head chef and waiter), one seating a night and was located in a typical Irish Cottage.

== History ==
Although living in Berlin at the time, Pilz bought the villa Woodlands in 1983. She and her family moved to Ireland and renovated the villa before opening the restaurant. They opened Shiro "to have something to do".

The Michelin Guide awarded the restaurant the "Red M", indicating 'good food at a reasonable price', in the period 1988–1995. The Egon Ronay Guide awarded the restaurant one star in the period 1988–1989. The restaurant was awarded one Michelin star in the period 1996–2001.

== Key people ==
=== Kei Pilz ===
Kei Pilz (died 2001) was a Japanese Michelin-starred head chef and co-owner of Shiro. Together with her husband Werner Pilz, a German, she ran the restaurant in her own living room. Aside from cooking, she specialized in Japanese watercolour calligraphy and paintings.

She died in 2001.

== See also ==
- List of Michelin-starred restaurants in Ireland
