= Loam (disambiguation) =

Loam is a type of soil.

Loam or LOAM may also refer to:

- LOAM, the Louisiana Midland Railroad
- Loam (restaurant), a wine bar in Galway, Ireland
- Michael Loam (1797–1871), British engineer
- The Earl of Loam, a fictional character from The Admirable Crichton

== See also ==
- Low-power AM, see Low-power broadcasting
- Loaming
