= Hans Peter Matthiae =

German chef working in Ireland

- Born: Germany
- Died: 4 January 2023; Ardmore, County Waterford
- Occupation: Head chef
- Known for: Michelin starred Chez Hans

Hans Peter (Hans) Matthiae (?-Ardmore, County Waterford, 4 January 2023) was a German Michelin-starred head chef and owner of the restaurant Chez Hans in Cashel, County Tipperary, Ireland.

In 1968 Matthiae bought the former Synod Hall on Moor Street in Cashel. After a major renovation, he opened it as a restaurant. It became a quality restaurant that was awarded one Michelin star in 1983. The Michelin Guide awarded the restaurant the "Red M", indicating 'good food at a reasonable price', in the period 1981–1982, 1985-1986 and 1996. The Egon Ronay Guide awarded the restaurant one star in 1982.

Hans Matthiae retired in 1998 and handed the kitchen over to his son Jason.
