= Matt Dowling =

Matt Dowling may refer to:

- Matt Dowling (chef) (born 1945), Irish head chef
- Matt Dowling (politician) (born 1984), American politician
- Matthew Dowling (born 1974), Australian rugby union player
