= Park (restaurant) =

Coordinates: 51°52′57.83″N 9°34′59.04″W

- Interactive map of Park

Restaurant information
- Head chef: Mark Johnston
- Food type: Modern Irish
- Rating: Michelin Guide (1983-1990, 1994-1999)
- Location: Kenmare, County Kerry, Ireland
- Website: www.parkkenmare.com

Park is a restaurant housed in the Park Hotel Kenmare, Kenmare, County Kerry, Ireland. It is a fine dining restaurant that was awarded one Michelin star each year in the period 1983-1990 and in the period 1994–1999. The Egon Ronay Guide awarded the restaurant one star in the period 1983–1984.

The restaurant is housed in the 5-star hotel "Park Hotel Kenmare", which was established in 1897.

In the periods that the restaurant was awarded Michelin stars, headchef were Colin O'Daly (1983-1985), Brian Cleere (1994-1995), Bruno Schmidt and Matthew d'Arcy

== See also ==
- List of Michelin starred restaurants in Ireland
