= Arbutus Lodge =

Coordinates: 51°54′16.38″N 8°27′15.228″W

- Interactive map of Arbutus Lodge

Restaurant information
- Established: 1971
- Closed: 2002
- Head chef: Declan and Michael Ryan
- Rating: Michelin Guide
- Location: Montenotte, Cork, County Cork, Ireland

Arbutus Lodge was a restaurant and hotel in Cork in County Cork, Ireland. It was a fine dining restaurant that was yearly awarded one Michelin star in the periods 1974–1983, 1987 and 1988.

The Egon Ronay Guide awarded the restaurant one star in the periods 1975–1978, 1983 and 1987. It was awarded two stars in the periods 1979-1981 and 1984–1985. In 1982 it was awarded the highest possible ranking of three stars.

The Ryan family bought the estate Arbutus Lodge in 1961 and converted it into a hotel and restaurant. In 1971 the complex was opened. The restaurant quickly gained a reputation as one of the best restaurants in Ireland, which was confirmed by the international Michelin star. In 1999 they sold the hotel to the Carmody Group. Carmody's bankruptcy in 2002 also marked the definitive end of the 3-star hotel. The building was partially demolished and converted into apartments after 2005 and is no longer recognizable as a former hotel or restaurant. Stone pillars on each side of the driveway entrance for the building still have the words "Arbuutus" (spelling with the double u's) and "Lodge" on them.

Head chefs of Arbutus Lodge were the brothers Declan and Michael Ryan.

== See also ==
- List of Michelin starred restaurants in Ireland
