= Colin O'Daly =

Irish chef (1952–2023)

- Born: 23 September 1952; Dublin, Ireland
- Died: 4 August 2023 (aged 70); Cork, Ireland
- Occupations: Chef, restaurateur
- Known for: Michelin star
- Website: https://www.colinodaly.com

Colin O'Daly (23 September 1952 – 4 August 2023) was an Irish Michelin star-winning head chef of the restaurant Park.

== Career ==
O'Daly started his career in the catering industry as a 16-year-old commis chef in the terminal kitchen of Dublin Airport under the leadership of Jimmy Doyle. After finishing his training he went on to Ashford Castle in Cong, County Mayo. Due to bad health Colin O'Daly left Cong and returned to Dublin. He did several short stints including a year at UCD, where he met his wife. His first job as head chef was in the Renvyle House Hotel in the Connemara, County Galway. O'Daly left there because of health problems from his children and returned to Dublin. He later returned to county Mayo to work in Newport House, then carrying an Egon Ronay Guide star.

Looking for some stability for his family, he accepted the job offer from the Park Hotel Kenmare to become head chef of Park. Here, O'Daly earned his first Michelin star in 1983.

Forced by the ill health of his children he moved back to be closer to hospitals. Instead of a house he bought a rundown restaurant in Blackrock. Within a short time and with help from friends he turned The Park into a thriving place. The economic crisis in the late 1980s was too much and the restaurant closed down.

O'Daly had to reach a deal with the bank before he could start Roly's Bistro in 1992. That place was an instant success, but it still took him seven years to pay off his debts.

O'Daly retired as head chef in 2009 and spent a year painting in Mexico after that. After his break he took up consultancy role as culinary advisor for Café en Seine.

== Personal life and death ==
Colin O'Daly was divorced from his wife, Lyn, and had four children. Two sons died from a rare condition closely related to cystic fibrosis. O'Daly himself was a coeliac. He died in Cork on 4 August 2023, at the age of 70.

== Awards ==
- Gold Medal Award in Catering Exhibition, Dublin 1971
- Michelin star 1983–1985
