= Chez Hans =

Coordinates: 52°31′7.94″N 7°53′16.01″W

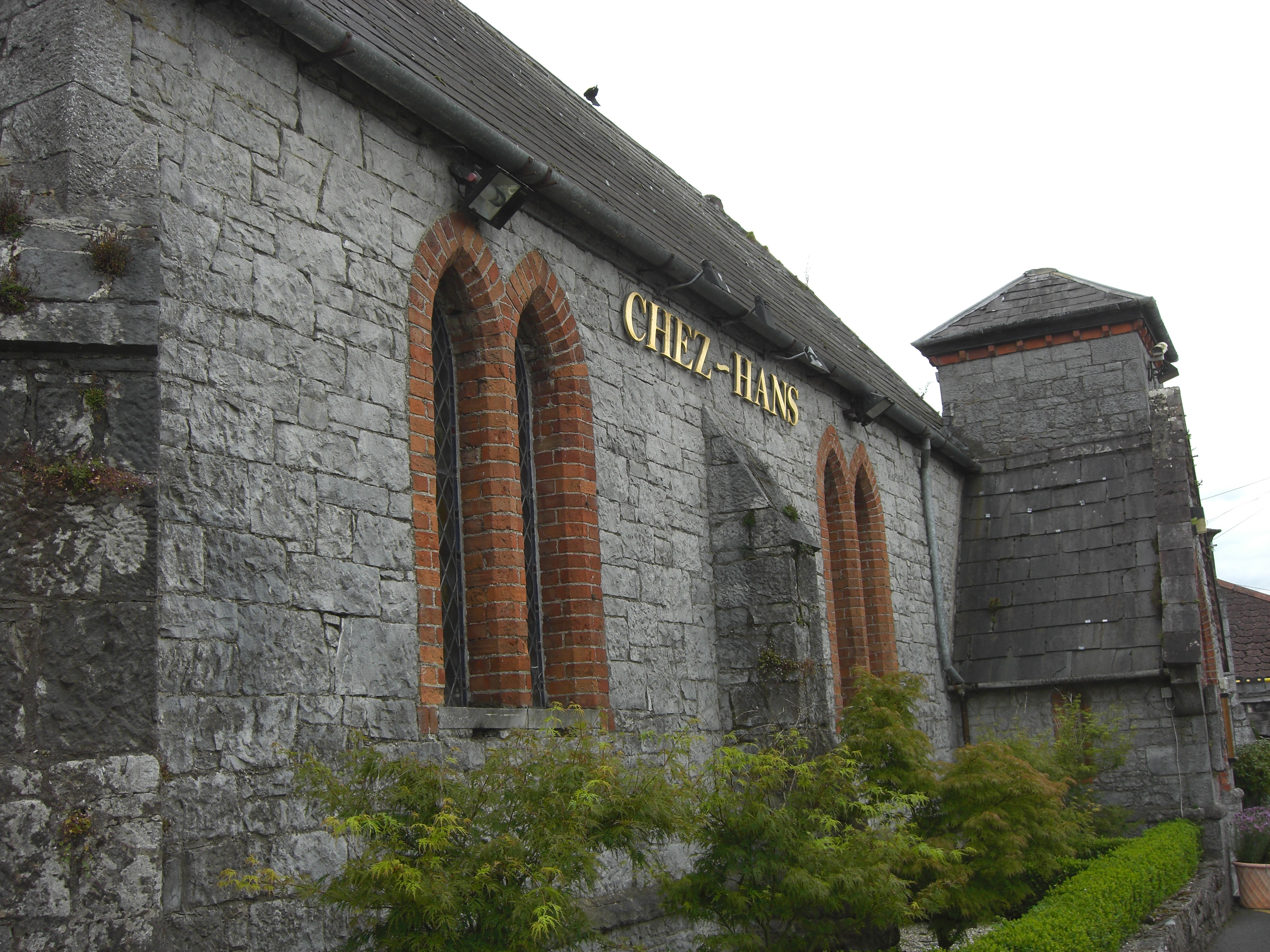
- Interactive map of Chez Hans

Restaurant information
- Established: 1968
- Head chef: Jason Matthiae
- Food type: International with Irish influences
- Rating: Michelin Guide (1983)
- Location: Moor Lane, Cashel, County Tipperary, Ireland
- Website: https://www.chezhans.net

Chez Hans is a restaurant located on Moor Lane in Cashel in County Tipperary, Ireland. It is a fine dining restaurant that was awarded one Michelin star 1983. The Michelin Guide awarded the restaurant the "Red M", indicating 'good food at a reasonable price', in the period 1981–1982, 1985-1986 and 1996. The Egon Ronay Guide awarded the restaurant one star in 1982.

The kitchen style of Chez Hans is International with Irish influences.

In the time the restaurant was awarded the Michelin star, the head chef was Hans Peter Matthiae. In 1998 he handed the ladle over to his son Jason Matthiae.

The restaurant is housed in the former Synod Hall of the (Protestant) Diocese of Cashel and Waterford and was used as such until 1950. The diocese sold the building that year to a businessman who sold it to Hans Matthiae in 1968. After an extensive renovation the building started a new life as a restaurant.

== See also ==
- List of Michelin-starred restaurants in Ireland
