= Stefan Matz =

German chef

- Born: Germany
- Occupation: Head Chef
- Employer: Ashford Castle
- Known for: Michelin star with Erriseask House

Stefan Matz is a German head chef of Ashford Castle and The g Hotel. He was, together with his brother, owner of the Michelin starred restaurant and hotel Erriseask House in Ballyconneely in County Galway, Ireland.

Matz did his training in Germany and Switzerland, working amongst others in Restaurant Chesery in Gstaad. From 1989 to 2001 he was co-owner and head chef of Erriseask House. He left to work in Portmarnock Hotel and Golf Links in Dublin. In 2003 he left the big city and joined the kitchen brigade of Asford Castle in Cong, County Galway.

== Awards ==
Erriseask House

- Chef of the Year 1995 - Egon Ronay Guide
- Bib Gourmand 1998
- Irish Beef Award 1999 - Georgina Campbell's Ireland Guide
- Michelin star with Erriseask House 2000 and 2001

Portmarnock Hotel and Golf Links

- Three AA Rosettes

Ashford Castle

- Chef of the Year 2007 - Georgina Campbell's Ireland Guide
- Best Chef 2010 - 2010 Ireland Good Eating Guide

== Personal life ==
According to Georgina Campbell's Ireland Guide, Matz is a modest but highly skilled chef.
