= Aniar =

Coordinates: 53°16′15.95″N 9°3′25.45″W

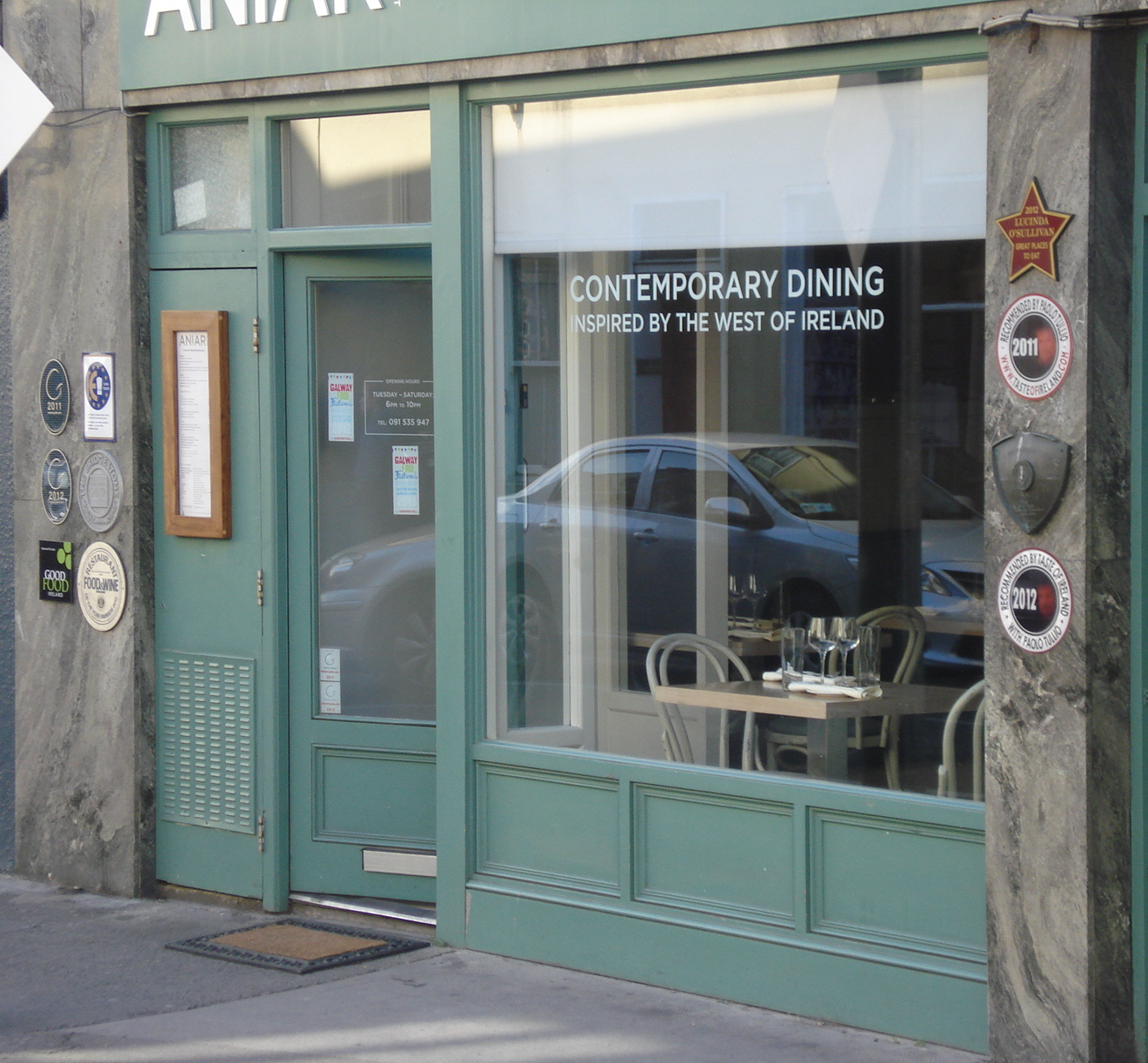
- Interactive map of Aniar

Restaurant information
- Established: 2011
- Owners: JP McMahon and Drigín Gaffey
- Head chef: JP McMahon
- Food type: Regional; New Irish Cuisine
- Dress code: Casual
- Rating: Michelin Guide
- Location: 53 Lower Dominick Street, Galway, County Galway, Ireland
- Seating capacity: 24
- Website: Official website

Aniar (Irish pronunciation: [əˈn̠ʲiəɾˠ]; meaning "From the west") is a restaurant in Galway, Ireland. It is a fine dining restaurant that is awarded one Michelin star in 2013 and retained that rating until present.

The head chef to win the Michelin star was Enda McEvoy. He left in 2013 and Ultan Cooke took over. He retained the star for 2014. The owner Jp McMahon took over the kitchen upon Cooke's departure in June 2015. He retained the star that year.

== Awards ==
- Michelin star: since 2013
- Best Restaurant in Connaught: 2012, 2015, 2016
- Best Restaurant in Galway: 2013

== See also ==
- List of Michelin starred restaurants in Ireland
