= Bon Appétit (restaurant) =

Coordinates: 53°27′5.74″N 6°9′6.29″W

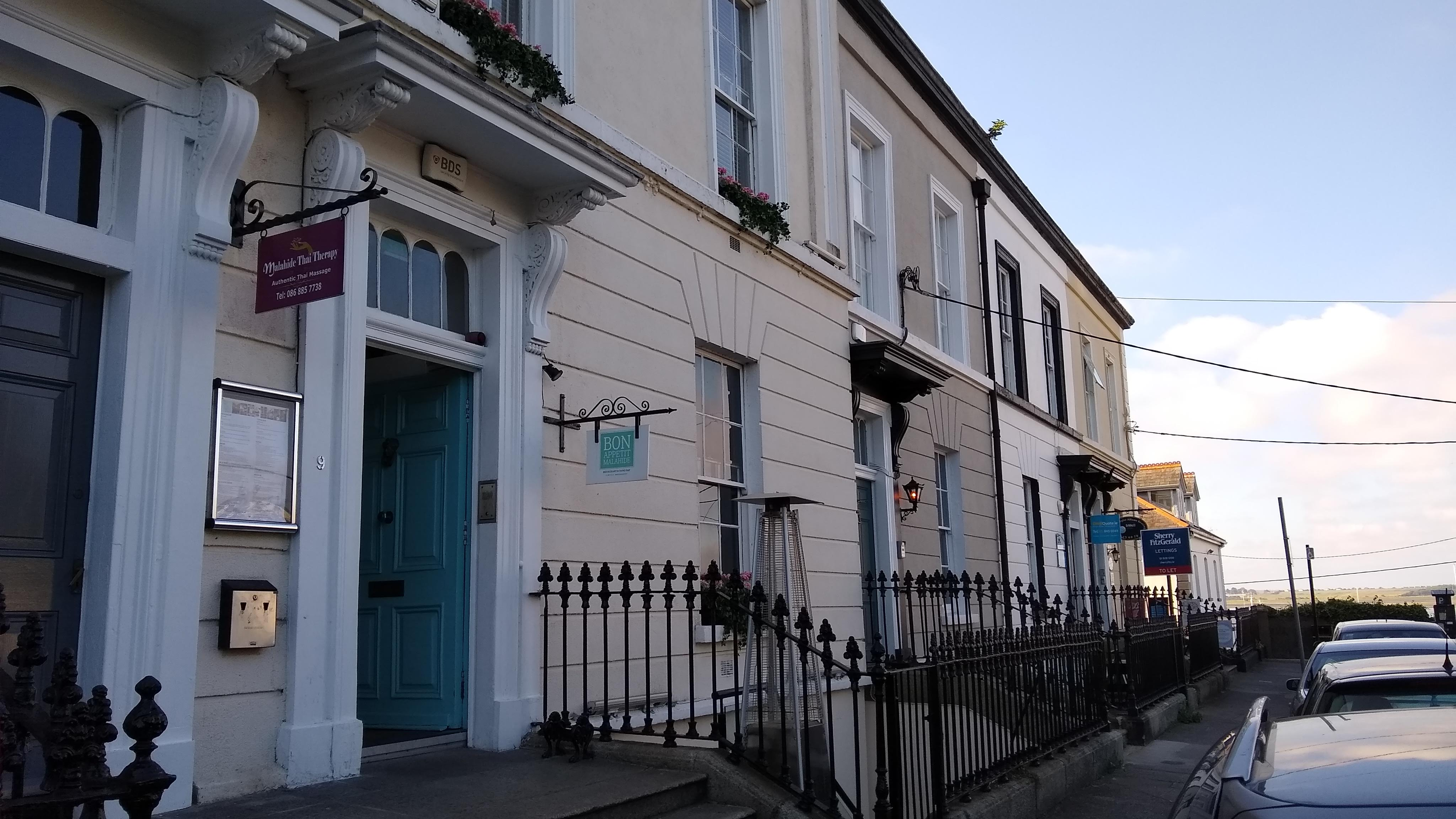
- Interactive map of Bon Appétit

Restaurant information
- Established: 2006
- Head chef: Oliver Dunne
- Location: 9 James Terrace, Malahide, Ireland
- Website: http://bonappetit.ie

Bon Appétit was a restaurant located at 9 James Terrace, Malahide, County Dublin, Ireland. It was a fine dining restaurant that received one Michelin star in each year from 2008 until 2015. The restaurant closed its doors on 4 January 2026.

The restaurant was established in 2006 and housed in a classic Georgian house in the village of Malahide. Aside from the Michelin-starred restaurant there is also a brasserie in the building. Prior to 'Bon Appétit' it housed "Johnny's" (1974–1989), a restaurant run by Johnny Opperman, and "Bon Appetit" (1990–2006), run by Patsy McGuirck.

The head chef of Bon Appétit is Oliver Dunne.

== See also ==
- List of Michelin starred restaurants in Ireland
