= Matthew d'Arcy =

Irish chef

- Born: Dublin, County Dublin, Ireland
- Died: about 1997
- Occupation: Chef
- Employer: Self-employed
- Known for: Michelin starred Park

Matthew (Matt) d'Arcy (born Dublin, died about 1997) was an Irish Michelin star winning head chef during his spell in the kitchen of restaurant Park in the Park Hotel Kenmare. Later, in 1992, he opened "d'Arcy's Kenmare" in Kenmare.

== Personal ==
D'Arcy was married to Aileen O'Brien and two sons. He met his wife in the Park Hotel Kenmare where they both were working as chefs. They married in 1988.

== Awards ==
- Michelin star Park Hotel Kenmare. Years unknown, between 1983 and 1990.
