= The Russell Hotel =

Coordinates: 53°20′14.36″N 6°15′43.97″W

- Interactive map of The Russell Hotel

Restaurant information
- Established: 1880s
- Closed: 1974
- Head chef: Pierre Rolland, Jackie Needham
- Rating: Michelin Guide
- Location: 101–104 St. Stephen's Green, Dublin, Ireland

The Russell Hotel or Hotel Russell is a defunct hotel located at 101–104 St. Stephen's Green South in Dublin, Ireland. The hotel had a fine dining restaurant that was awarded one Michelin star in 1974.

== History ==
The Russell Hotel was originally founded in the context of the temperance movement by a staunch supporter of the movement, Sir Thomas Russell, 1st Baronet. His son-in-law, Victor Marcel Charles Barrois de Sarigny, ran the hotel until 1929. According to an advertisement in 1927, it was already a well-known restaurant with a full license. Only after the takeover by the Besson family in 1947 was the hotel associated with haute cuisine when Ken Besson took on Matt Byrne as sous chef from the Hotel Café Royal. Byrne had previously worked at another Besson owned hotel nearby, the Royal Hibernian Hotel on Dawson Street.

The hotel originally operated from three Georgian houses on the corner of the square, numbers 102, 103 and 104 before number 101 was also acquired by the Besson family and incorporated into the hotel in 1947.

== 20th century cuisine ==
After the acquisition of the hotel by the Besson family, under the leadership of Ken Besson, a number of French chefs were hired. The ITGWU objected to this, due to the existing high unemployment, but quickly reached an agreement on the training of Irish chefs and kitchen staff. Many Irish chefs received (some of) their training here.

In 1963, at the publication of the Egon Ronay Guide, The Russell Hotel was the only hotel in Ireland awarded three stars. In 1973, the hotel was awarded two stars, despite a decline in the number of stars awarded by about 30%. The Michelin Guide awarded the restaurant one star in 1974. Well known chefs at the hotel were Pierre Rolland, Jackie Needham and Roger Noblet. It was under the leadership of head chef Matt Dowling that it earned its Michelin star.

For a period the hotel supplied food for state banquets in the nearby Department of Foreign Affairs at Iveagh House via its Robert Emmet Grill.

== Closure ==
The hotel was taken over in 1966 by the Kingsley Windsor group from London, who also acquired the adjoining former site of Wesley College. The group employed Scott Tallon Walker to design plans to redevelop the site with a large modern hotel, with office block on the site of the hotel. This was granted permission in June 1970, and the hotel was later closed ahead of demolition in April 1974.

== See also ==
- List of Michelin starred restaurants in Ireland
