= Oliver Dunne =

Irish head chef and restaurant owner

- Born: 1977 (age 48–49); Dublin
- Occupations: Chef and restaurateur

Oliver Dunne (Dublin, 1977) is an Irish chef and restaurant owner. He was the owner of the Michelin-starred restaurant Bon Appétit in Malahide, County Dublin. until it closed in January 2026. He reopened that restaurant under the name Osteria Nove in February 2026. Dunne was a regular guest in the former Irish TV-show The Afternoon Show.

Dunne started his career as commis at Gotham Café in Dublin. From there he went on to work at other places, including the Peacock Alley, before he left for London. In London he worked for chefs such as Gordon Ramsay and Gary Rhodes.

In 2003, Dunne returned to Ireland. He started working as head chef in restaurant Zucchini in Ranelagh. Within a few weeks, he renamed the place to Mint. In 2006, Dylan McGrath took over the spadle when Dunne bought Bon Appétit in Malahide. Dunne was awarded a Michelin star in 2008 for his cooking there.

Besides his work at the restaurant, Dunne also acts as guest-chef for the Dublin Cookery School, an institution for cooking courses.

In August 2013 he opened a new restaurant in the Clarence Hotel, together with Rory Carville.

== Severed head tweet ==
In August 2013, Dunne received a negative review by Sunday Independent food critic Lucinda O'Sullivan of his restaurant Cleaver East, which had recently opened. He posted an image on Twitter of himself holding a meat cleaver alongside Carville holding O'Sullivan's bloodied head. The image was reported to gardaí.

== Personal life ==
Dunne lives in Malahide with his wife and two children.
