= Cliff House Hotel =

Hotel in Ardmore, County Waterford, Ireland

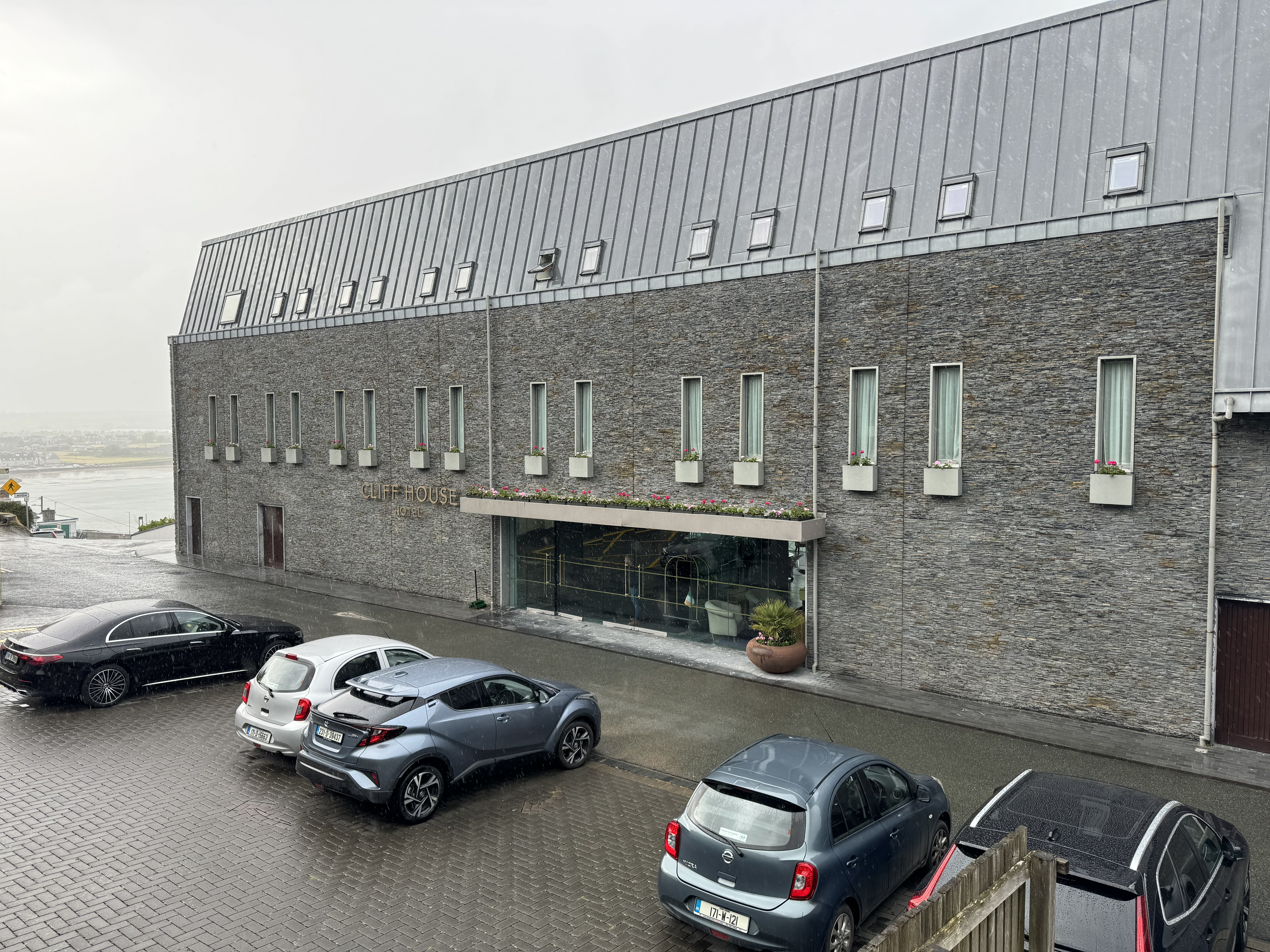
- The Cliff House Hotel in 2024
- Interactive map of the Cliff House Hotel area

General information
- Location: Ardmore, County Waterford, Ireland
- Coordinates: 51°56′53″N 7°42′55″W

Other information
- Number of restaurants: 1

Website
- Official website

The Cliff House Hotel is a luxury hotel in Ardmore, County Waterford, Ireland. The House restaurant is located in the hotel. run by head chef Martijn Kajuiter. Kajuiter left the role in 2020.
