= Martijn Kajuiter =

Dutch head chef

- Born: 1974 (age 51–52); Groningen, Netherlands
- Occupation: Head chef
- Employer: Cliff House Hotel
- Known for: Michelin starred The House
- Height: 6 ft 9 in (2.06 m)
- Website: www.martijnkajuiter.com

Martijn Kajuiter (born 1974 in Groningen, Netherlands) is a Dutch Michelin-starred head chef with Cliff House Hotel in Ardmore, County Waterford.

Kajuiter's passion for food started at a young age, due to his parents running a restaurant. In 1991, aged 17, he started his kitchen career in Les Quatre Canetons, under head chef Wynand Vogel. Like most chefs he moved around from restaurant to restaurant, to pick up as much knowledge and experience as possible. That is why he moved to London in 1995. Here he worked at L'Ortolan (under John Burton Race), Waterside Inn (under Michel Roux), La Tante Claire (under Pierre Koffmann) and finally in The Restaurant Marco Pierre White (under Marco Pierre White).

In 1998 he returned to Les Quatre Canetons. In 2000, he became head chef of restaurant Kwekerij de Kas in Amsterdam, Netherlands.

Kajuiter came to Ireland in 2007 to become "executive chef in charge of Food and Beverages" of the Cliff House Hotel. In that job he is responsible for the main restaurant of the hotel The House. Much to his surprise, he earned one Michelin star in 2010, only two years after the reopening of the hotel.

After leaving the Cliff House Hotel, he started working at Wshs Weeshuis Hotel in Gouda, Netherlands.

== Awards ==
- Good Food Award 2008 - Best of the South
- Georgina Campbell's "Newcomer of the Year 2009" award.
- Michelin Star 2010–present
- 3 AA Rosettes 2011/2012
- 4 AA Rosettes 2013/2014/2015/2016/2017

== Books ==
- Cliff House Hotel: The Cookbook; 2009
- Lets Go Disco - 1 year at The House Restaurant 2012
