= Castlestrange Stone =

Iron Age carved stone in Ireland

Coordinates: 53°35′06″N 8°16′14″W

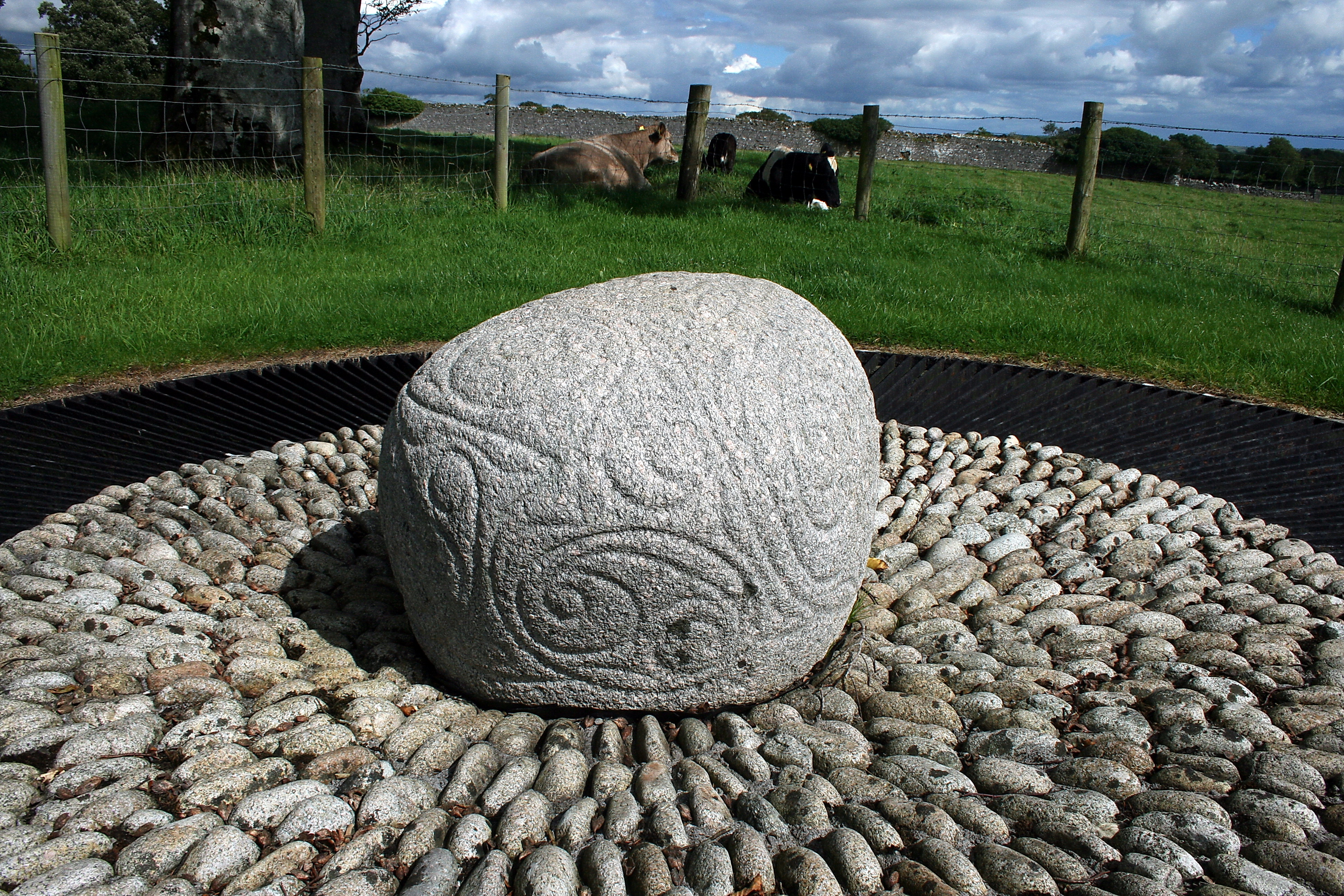
The Castlestrange stone

3D model

The Castlestrange stone is located in the grounds of Castlestrange House near Athleague in County Roscommon, Ireland. It is a granite boulder decorated with flowing spirals in the La Tène style, dating from the Iron Age period between 300 BC and 100 AD.

Only three other stones of this type have been found in Ireland, the Turoe Stone in County Galway, the Killycluggin Stone in County Cavan and the Derrykeighan Stone in County Antrim. All four stones lie on roughly the same line connecting them on a map of Ireland. The use of the stones is not known but it is assumed they served some religious or ritual purpose.

The stone is a protected National Monument.

== See also ==
- The Turoe stone near Loughrea, County Galway.
