= Turoe Stone =

Celtic-style granite stone in Ireland

- Cloch an Tuair Rua (Irish)
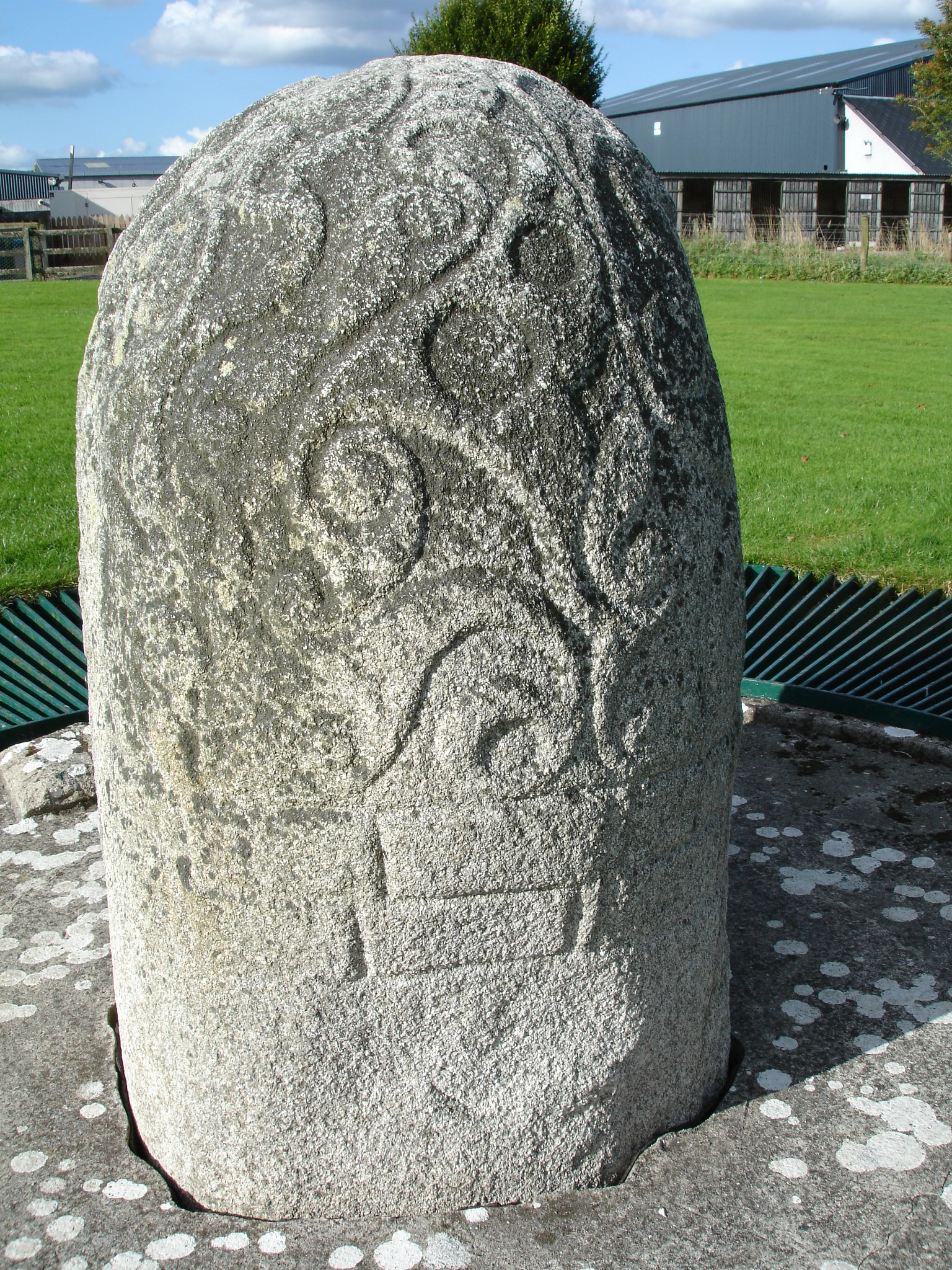

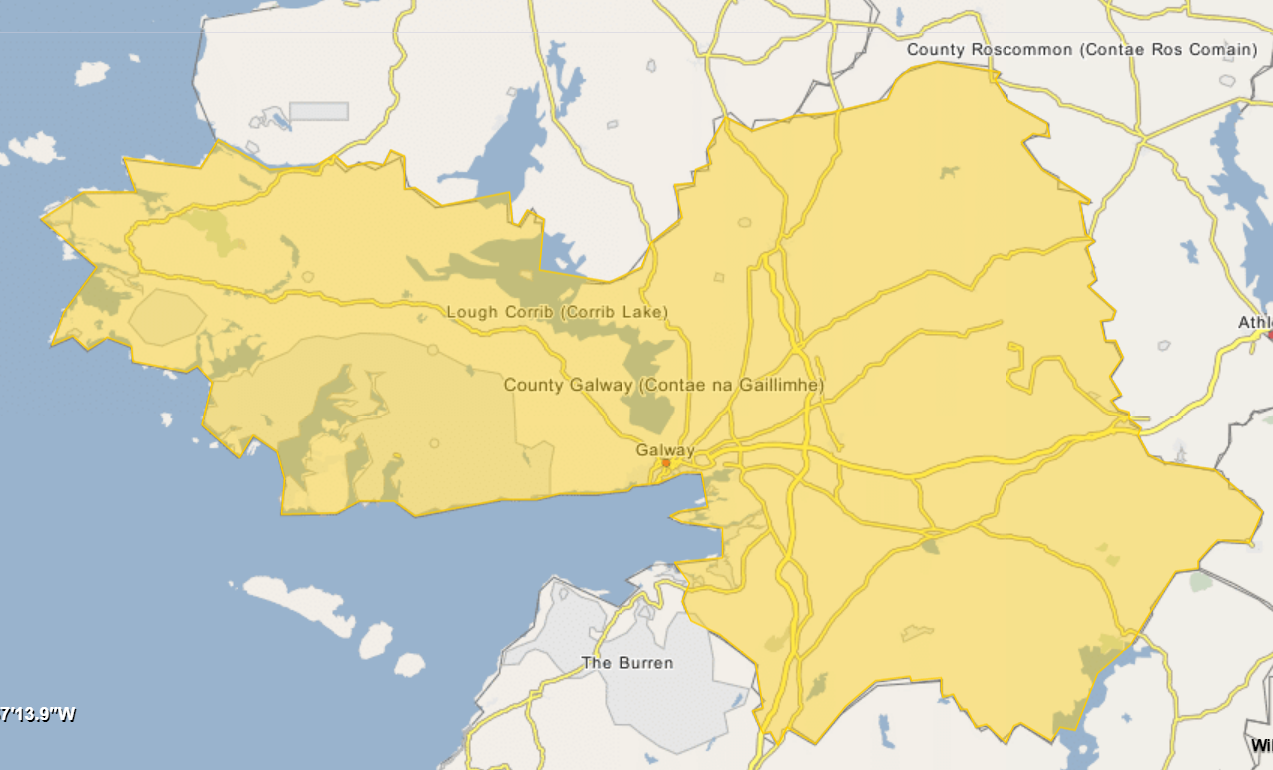
- Location within County Galway
- 53.252412°N 8.561209°W
- Type: Standing stone
- Cultures: Gaelic Ireland
- Location: Bullaun, County Galway, Ireland

History
- Built: c. 100 BC — AD 100

Site notes
- Material: Granite
- Height: 1.68 m (5 ft 6 in)
- Condition: Worn
- Owner: Office of Public Works
- Public access: yes

Designations
- Designation: National monument of Ireland

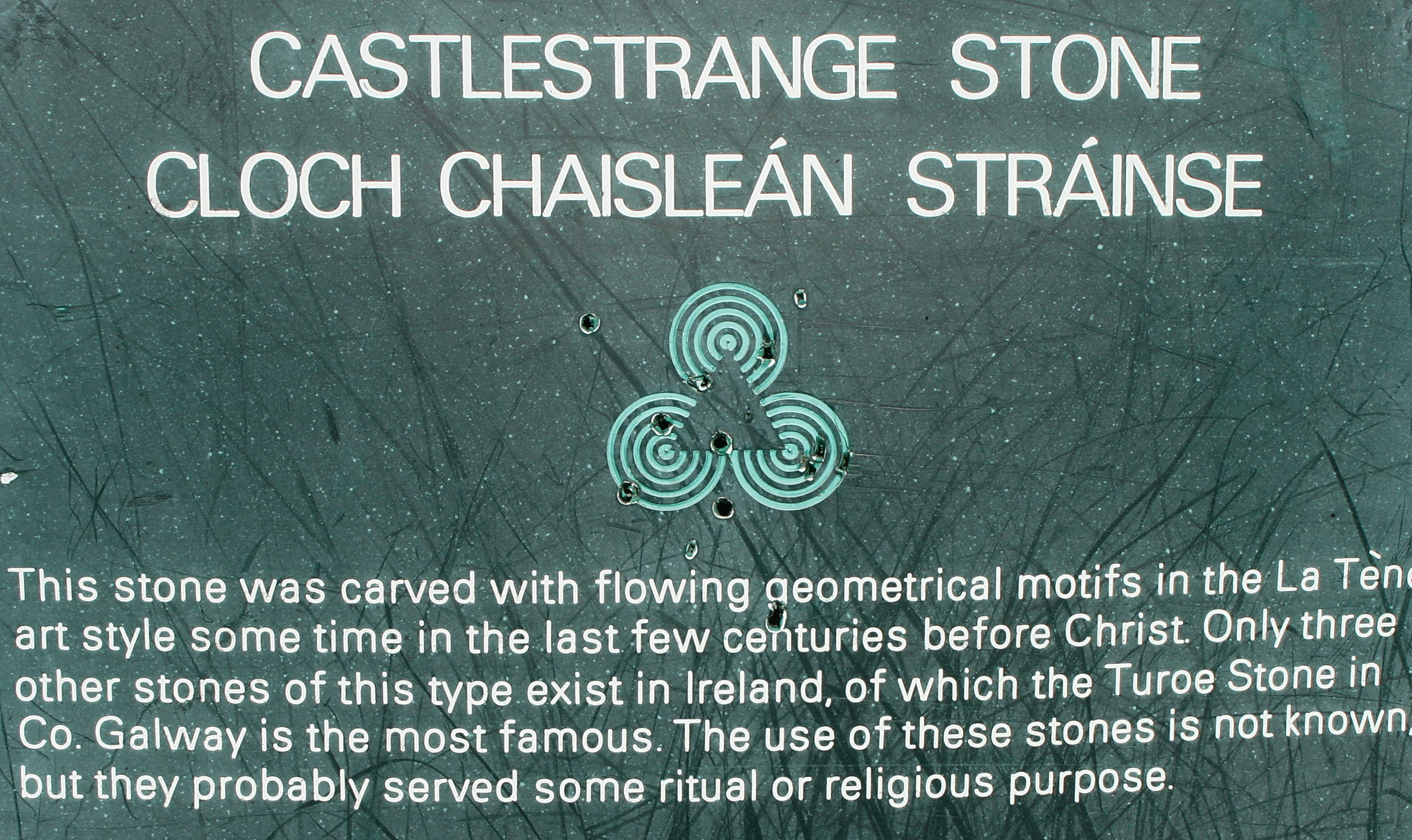
Reference to the Turoe stone at the Castlestrange stone

The Turoe stone is a 1.2 metre tall granite stone decorated in a Celtic style normally located in the village of Bullaun, County Galway, Ireland, 6 km north of Loughrea off the R350 regional road. It probably dates to about the period 100 BC to AD 100. The stone is usually positioned on the lawn in front of Turoe House, set in a concrete base surrounded by a metal cattle grill. The Turoe stone is National Monument of Ireland Number 327 (NM#327). As of 2025, the stone had been moved temporarily to an Office of Public Works depot in Athenry for conservation.

== Features ==
The top half of the stone is covered with a continuous abstract curvilinear La Tène style design similar to that on the Castlestrange Stone in County Roscommon.

== History ==
The Turoe Stone was for centuries a curiosity at a lios, or fairy fort, some 3 km from Bullaun, but was moved to Turoe Farm in the late 19th century and so the historic provenance has been destroyed. The religious or ceremonial purposes of the stone are lost in time. The stone can be classified as a ritual stone that might have been used in ceremonial rites such as the transfer of power.

George Coffey, in his 1904 paper for the Royal Irish Academy on the subject of La Tène art, said that the stone had been moved in the 1850s from the rath of Feerwore site.

The stone was temporarily moved to Dublin in 1967, as part of the ROSC 67 art exhibition, leading to the resignation of Niall Montgomery, of the Royal Institute of the Architects of Ireland, from the National Monuments Advisory Council.

In 2007, a proposal to remove the Turoe Stone from its location near Loughrea due to concerns that the stone is becoming increasingly vulnerable to the elements, met fierce local opposition.

As of 7 July 2014, it had been "temporarily" removed from the Turoe Petting Farm for restoration and cleaning. By 2025, the stone had still not been returned.

== Excavations ==
The stone was originally outside the rath of Feerwore (Irish: Rath Férach Mhor) at the top of Turoe hill in Turoe townland. Excavation yielded much material suggesting that an open site dating to the late centuries BC had been later enclosed.

== See also ==
- Lia Fáil
- Cross Inneenboy
- Castlestrange Stone
- Killycluggin Stone
- Omphalos of Delphi
