= Locks Brasserie =

Coordinates: 53°19′47.43″N 6°16′18.3″W

- Interactive map of Locks Brasserie

Restaurant information
- Established: 2010
- Closed: 18 July 2015
- Owner: Sébastien Masi
- Head chef: Karl Breen
- Food type: French Brasserie
- Rating: Michelin Guide
- Location: Number One Windsor Terrace, Portobello, Dublin, Ireland
- Seating capacity: 75

Locks Brasserie was a restaurant in Portobello, Dublin, Ireland. It was a fine dining restaurant that received one Michelin star for 2013 but lost it in 2014 due to the chef leaving.

The head chef of Locks Brasserie who earned the star was Rory Carville. He left the restaurant in July 2013 after which Keelan Higgs took over the kitchen. In February 2015 Karl Breen was appointed head chef.

Locks Brasserie was originally owned by Claire and Richard Douglas in the 1980s. In 2010, Sébastien Masi and Kirsten Batt took over. Locks Brasserie ceased trading on 18 July 2015.

== See also ==
- List of Michelin starred restaurants in Ireland
