= Heron and Grey =

Coordinates: 53°18′5.08″N 6°10′39.53″W

- Interactive map of Heron and Grey

Restaurant information
- Established: 2015
- Closed: January 2019
- Owners: Andrew Heron and Damien Grey
- Head chef: Damien Grey
- Rating: Michelin Guide
- Location: 19A Main Street, Blackrock, County Dublin, Ireland
- Seating capacity: 24

Heron and Grey was a restaurant in Blackrock, County Dublin, Ireland. It was a fine dining restaurant that was awarded one Michelin star for 2017, 2018 and 2019.

The head chef was Damien Grey while Andrew Heron ran the restaurant. They owned the restaurant together. In January 2019 the restaurant closed down.

== Awards ==
- Michelin star: 2017–2019 As of October 2019, Liath occupies the same space which formerly held Heron and Grey.

== See also ==
- List of Michelin starred restaurants in Ireland
