= The Commons Restaurant =

Restaurant in Dublin, Ireland

Coordinates: 53°20′21.29″N 6°15′27.93″W

- Interactive map of The Commons Restaurant

Restaurant information
- Established: 1989
- Closed: 2003
- Food type: Irish & French
- Location: St. Stephen's Green, Dublin, Ireland

The Commons Restaurant was a restaurant located in the historic Newman House (now location of the Museum of Literature) on St. Stephen's Green in Dublin, Ireland. It was owned by Michael Fitzgerald.

It was a fine dining restaurant that was awarded one Michelin star in each year in the period 1994–1997. The Michelin star was again awarded in 2002, but lost in 2003 due to the chef leaving. The restaurant later reopened on a more modest level.

Head chef of The Commons Restaurant during the last "Michelin period" was Aiden Byrne. The headchefs Gerry Kirwan (1994), Michael Bolster (1995) and Leslie Malone (1996 & 1997) took care of the first period. Last chef in this period was Sébastien Masi, but he, just aged 22, could not retain the star.

Shortly after losing the star the restaurant ran into financial difficulties and closed down. Dylan McGrath worked under Aiden Byrne as souschef.

== See also ==
- List of Michelin starred restaurants in Ireland
