= Bastible =

Restaurant in Dublin, Ireland

- Location within Central Dublin

Restaurant information
- Established: 4 November 2015
- Owners: Barry FitzGerald and Claire-Marie Thomas
- Head chef: Barry FitzGerald
- Food type: Irish cuisine
- Rating: Michelin Guide
- Location: 111 South Circular Road, Dublin, D08 RW2K, Ireland
- Coordinates: 53°19′56″N 6°16′30″W
- Reservations: Yes
- Website: bastible.com

Bastible is a restaurant in southern Dublin, Ireland. It was awarded a Michelin star in 2022.

== Location ==
Bastible is located at Leonard's corner in Portobello, at the junction of the South Circular Road and Clanbrassil Street.

== History ==
The restaurant's name is derived from bastible, a three-legged iron pot that stood over an open fire in a traditional Irish kitchen; it was an alternative to an oven and was used to bake bread.

Bastible was opened by Barry FitzGerald and ClareMarie Thomas in November 2015.

It received a Michelin star for the first time in 2022. According to the Guide Michelin, "The modern set menu features top class Irish ingredients at the height of season and each main ingredient is given the space to shine. Dishes are stripped-back, flavours are bold, and servings are generous: this is cooking that comes from the heart."

== Awards ==
- Michelin star: 2022

== See also ==
- List of Michelin starred restaurants in Ireland
