= Esther Ronay =

Hungarian-British documentary filmmaker (1940–2025)

Esther Ronay (24 August 1940 - 16 February 2025) was a Hungarian-British documentary filmmaker. She worked with the BBC and with the London Women's Film Group. She was the daughter of food critic Egon Ronay, and sister of fashion designer and former actress Edina Ronay. With the London Women's Film Group, she co-directed the 1978 film Rapunzel, Let Down Your Hair. She directed the 1972 film Women of the Rhondda and the 1991 film Beyond the Forest: Hungarian Music in Transylvania, which explored Hungarian Roma music.
