= Dede (restaurant) =

Restaurant in Baltimore, County Cork, Ireland

- Interactive map of Dede

Restaurant information
- Established: 27 April 2020; 6 years ago
- Owners: Ahmet Dede, Maria Archer
- Head chef: Ahmet Dede
- Food type: Turkish, Middle Eastern
- Rating: Michelin Guide
- Location: Customs House, Baltimore, County Cork, P81 K291, Ireland
- Coordinates: 51.483455°N 9.37238265°W
- Reservations: Yes
- Website: customshousebaltimore.com

Dede [dede], also called Dede@Customs House, is a Turkish restaurant in Baltimore, County Cork, Ireland. It was awarded its first Michelin star in 2021 and a second in 2023.

== History ==
Head chef Ahmet Dede, a native of Ankara, was previously head chef at Mews, another Michelin-starred restaurant in Baltimore. He founded Dede in 2020 with business partner Maria Archer. It opened on 27 April.

Instead of the elaborate tasting menu found in most modern haute cuisine restaurants, Dede serves "a less formal dinner with fewer but larger courses." The food is sourced from Cape Clear Island and other local County Cork producers.

Dede received a Michelin star in 2021; the Guide Michelin recommended the lobster kebab with isot pepper; wild Irish venison with buckwheat and orange; and the hazelnut baklava. It was awarded a second star in 2023.

== Awards ==
Michelin star (2021-2023)
(2023–present)

== See also ==
- List of Michelin starred restaurants in Ireland
- List of Turkish restaurants
