= The Greenhouse (restaurant) =

Coordinates: 53°20′23.08″N 6°15′30.97″E

- Interactive map of The Greenhouse

Restaurant information
- Established: 2012
- Closed: 2020
- Rating: Michelin Guide
- Location: Dawson Street, Dublin 2, Ireland
- Seating capacity: 40
- Website: Official website

The Greenhouse is a restaurant located in Dublin, Ireland. It is a fine dining restaurant that was awarded a Michelin star in 2016 and retained that until 2020, when it received its second star.

Head chef of The Greenhouse is the Finn Mikael Viljanen. Owner of The Greenhouse is Dublin restaurateur Eamonn O'Reilly.

"Connoisseurs" deemed the restaurant worthy of a Michelin star a few years earlier but to their annoyance, the restaurant did not get the award in either 2013 or 2014. The restaurant got its second star in 2020, one of only four Irish restaurants to ever receive that honour.

On 21 May 2021, The Irish Times announced that head chef Mickael Viljanen resigned and joined restaurant Chapter One to take over as head chef from restaurant owner Ross Lewis. As of February 2022, The Greenhouse has not reopened since closing during the COVID-19 pandemic in 2020.

== Awards ==
- One Michelin star: 2016, 2017, 2018, 2019
- Two Michelin stars: 2020

== See also ==
- List of Michelin starred restaurants in Ireland
