= Wild Honey Inn =

Coordinates: 53°1′42.19″N 9°17′45.02″W

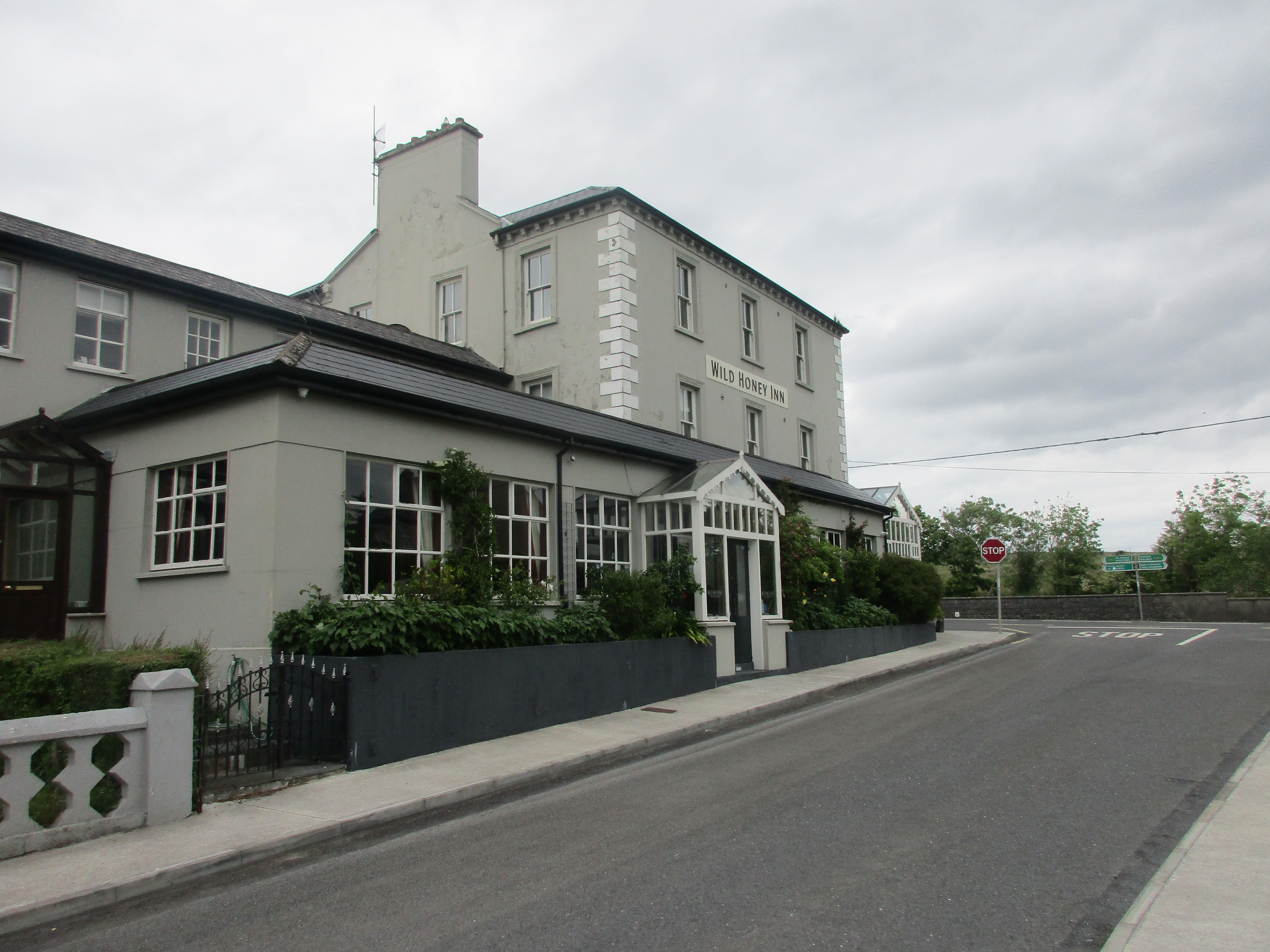
- Interactive map of Wild Honey Inn

Restaurant information
- Established: 2009
- Owners: Aidan McGrath and Kate Sweeney
- Head chef: Aidan McGrath
- Food type: Bistronomy
- Rating: Michelin Guide
- Location: Kincora Road, Lisdoonvarna, County Clare, V95 P234, Ireland
- Seating capacity: 30
- Other information: Wild Food from Land and Sea
- Website: www.wildhoneyinn.com

Wild Honey Inn, located in Lisdoonvarna, County Clare, is Ireland's only Michelin star pub with 14 rooms and has a four-star guesthouse rating. It was awarded a Michelin star in 2017.

The restaurant is owned by head chef Aidan McGrath and his partner Kate Sweeney.

The restaurant is housed in the former hotel Kincora House, which has a history dating back to the 1840s. McGrath and Sweeney bought the building in late 2008 and opened in 2009 as the Wild Honey Inn after doing some work to the building. They continued with the refurbishment over the years and the Victorian building is fully restored and is operated by the couple as a Fáilte Ireland and AA 5-star rated guesthouse. Aidan McGrath has also won 2 AA rosettes for his food.

== Awards ==
- Bib Gourmand: 2010–2017
- Michelin star: since 2017

== See also ==
- List of Michelin starred restaurants in Ireland
