= Campagne (restaurant) =

Restaurant in Kilkenny, Ireland

Coordinates: 52°39′20.97″N 7°14′46.58″W

- Interactive map of Campagne

Restaurant information
- Established: 2008
- Owners: Gareth Byrne and Brid Hannon
- Head chef: Gareth Byrne
- Food type: Contemporary French
- Rating: Michelin Guide
- Location: 5, The Arches, Gas House Lane, Kilkenny, County Kilkenny, Ireland
- Seating capacity: 70
- Website: Official website

Campagne (French pronunciation: [kɑ̃.paɲ], meaning "countryside") is a restaurant in Kilkenny, Ireland. It is a fine dining restaurant that was awarded a Michelin star each year from 2014 to present.

Head chef Gareth Byrne, formerly of Chapter One, opened the restaurant in 2008.

== Awards ==
- Michelin star: 2014, 2015, 2016, 2017, 2018, 2019, 2020
- Georgina Campbell's Restaurant of the Year Award: 2010.

== See also ==
- List of Michelin starred restaurants in Ireland
