= Erriseask House =

Irish restaurant and hotel founded in 1989

Coordinates: 53°26′16″N 10°4′38″W

- Interactive map of Erriseask House

Restaurant information
- Established: 1989
- Head chef: Stefan Matz
- Rating: Michelin Guide
- Location: Ballyconneely, Connemara, County Galway, Ireland

Erriseask House is a defunct restaurant and hotel in Ballyconneely, County Galway, Ireland. It was a fine dining restaurant that was awarded one Michelin star both in 2000 and 2001.

The hotel was owned by the brothers Matz, who sold the hotel in 2002. Stefan Matz was the head chef.

The hotel reopened in 2015 as the Connemara Sands Hotel, with Stefan Matz as Executive Head Chef.

== See also ==
- List of Michelin starred restaurants in Ireland
