= Michael Ryan (chef) =

Irish chef, born 1953

- Born: 1953 (age 72–73); Cork, County Cork, Ireland
- Occupation: Chef
- Known for: Michelin starred Arbutus Lodge
- Partner: Catherine Ryan
- Children: 3

Michael Ryan (born 1953, Cork) is an Irish Michelin star winning head chef and hotel/restaurant owner in Cork, Ireland. He is best known for the Arbutus Lodge and Isaacs restaurant. In the period 1971-1999, he and his family were owners of the Michelin-star-winning Arbutus Lodge. The Arbutus Lodge was the first ever Michelin starred restaurant in Ireland. One year after the Arbutus Lodge was awarded its Michelin star, Ballymaloe would go on to become Ireland's second Michelin-starred restaurant.

The Ryan family also purchased the Cashel palace hotel in 1980 which won a Michelin star after only 1 year in operation.

In his early years Michael followed in the footsteps of his older brother Declan, Ryan did a part of his chef training abroad, working in France with Paul Bocuse in Lyon and the Troisgros family in Roanne. Afterwards, he worked as chef and head chef in Arbutus Lodge, till its closure in 1999.

Michael opened Isaacs Restaurant with his wife Catherine Ryan and their business partner Canice Sharky (formerly of Ballymaloe) in 1992.

His son Philip took over the business in 2020 upon his retirement

Michael also opened other restaurants over the years. He operated 'Niblics' restaurant in fota island golf club when the course first opened in 1993. He also opened a restaurant in 2003 called 'Esaus' which was located in Carey's Lane in Cork. He purchased the property from Jerry Twomey, who had operated the very successful Paddy Garibaldis restaurant on that site for many years.

In 1995, Michael was cast as the celebrity chef in a highly successful Irish food and wine tv show. The show, which was commissioned by RTE, was called 'A Movable Feast'. It ran for 2 seasons on RTE 1. Michael was the celebrity chef, and he was joined onscreen by Tom Dorley, who was the resident wine expert.

Micheal was also heavily involved in Euro-toques, an organisation for chefs and cooks that works to protect and pass on culinary traditions as part of the cultural heritage. He worked closely with Myrtle Allen of Ballymaloe and served as treasurer of the organisation for many years.

== Personal ==
Michael Ryan is the younger brother of Declan Ryan, former head chef and now artisan baker.

== Awards ==
- Michelin Star Arbutus Lodge: 1974-1983 & 1986-1987
