= The House (restaurant) =

Irish restaurant

Coordinates: 51°56′51.69″N 7°42′48.3″W

House
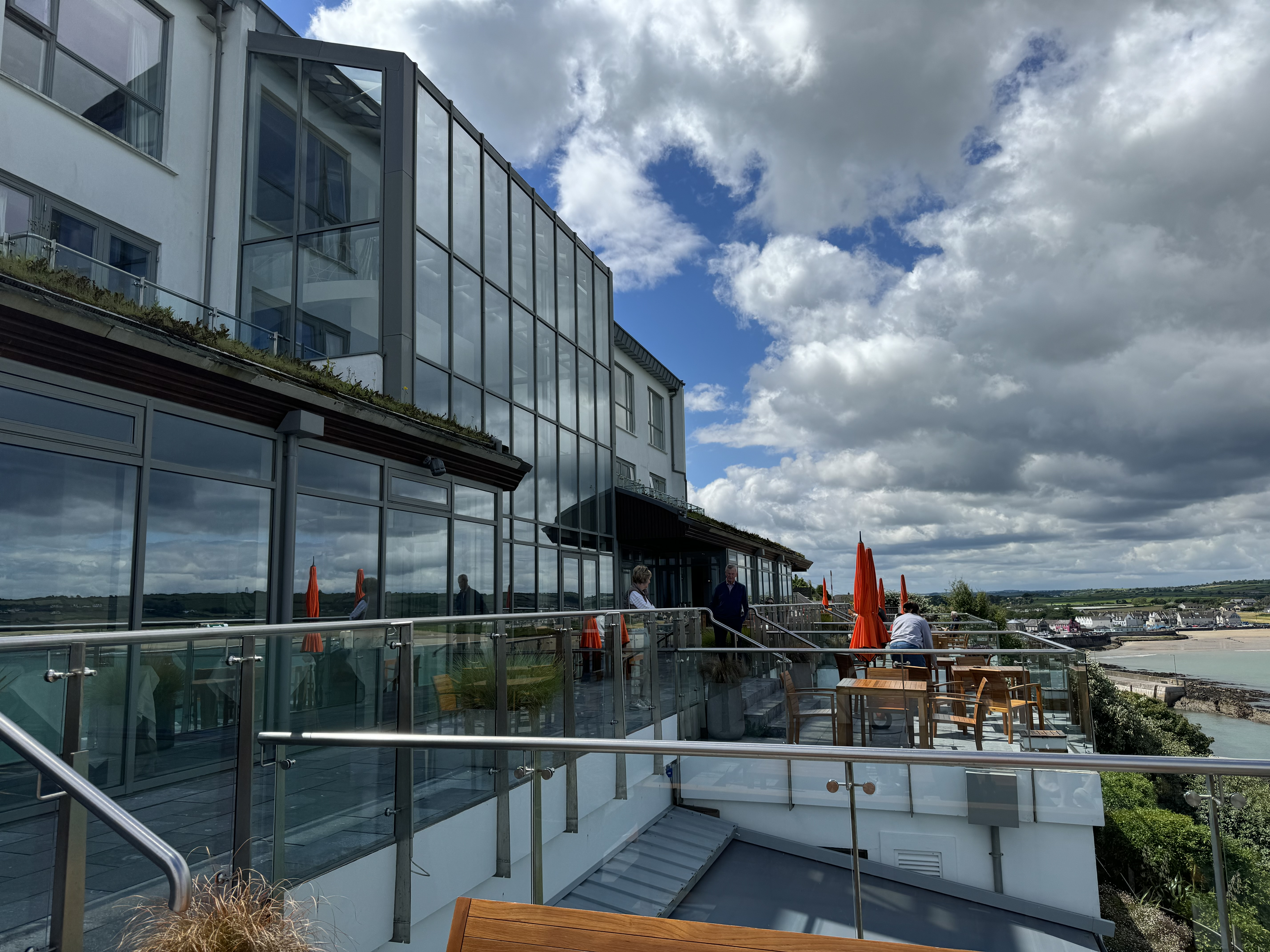
- House in 2024
- Interactive map of House

Restaurant information
- Established: 2008
- Head chef: Josef Zammit
- Food type: Irish with international influences
- Rating: Michelin Guide
- Location: Ardmore, County Waterford, Ireland
- Seating capacity: 45
- Website: cliffhousehotel.ie

House is one of the restaurants at the Cliff House Hotel in Ardmore, County Waterford, Ireland. It is a fine dining restaurant that was awarded a Michelin star for each year in the period 2010 to present. Bridgestone Guides also lists the hotel as one of the 100 Best Places To Eat. Journalist Pól Ó Conghaile listed the hotel and restaurant on his The travel hot list 2010 in the Irish Independent.

The original Cliff House Hotel was established around 1932. In 2008, it was almost completely rebuilt. The restaurant was created during this rebuilding.

The first head chef of The House to earn a Michelin star was another Dutchman, Martijn Kajuiter. Kajuiter left the role in 2020.

Chef Ian Doyle successfully maintained the Michelin star status of House for 2021 & 2022. Doyle left in 2022 and was succeeded by Tony Parkin. In 2025, Chef Josef Zammit took over the restaurant.

== Awards ==
- Top Regional Member Award South 2008
- Georgina Campbell's "Newcomer of the Year 2009" award.
- Michelin star, 2010–present
- Four AA Rosettes 2013–2018
- Hospitality Ireland Overall Winner for Best Hotel Restaurant 2019

== See also ==
- List of Michelin-starred restaurants in Ireland
