= Liath (restaurant) =

- Location within Dublin

Restaurant information
- Established: 15 March 2019
- Head chef: Damien Grey
- Rating: Michelin Guide
- Location: 19A Main Street, Blackrock, County Dublin, Ireland
- Coordinates: 53°18′5.08″N 6°10′39.53″W
- Seating capacity: 22
- Website: Official website

Liath (Irish: [ˈl̠ʲiə], "grey") is a restaurant in Blackrock, County Dublin, Ireland. It is a fine dining restaurant that was awarded one Michelin star in 2020. It won a second star in 2022.

The head chef is Damien Grey. It is the successor to Heron and Grey, which stood on the same site between 2015 and 2019.

== Awards ==
- One Michelin star: since 2020
- Two Michelin stars: since 2022

== See also ==
- List of Michelin starred restaurants in Ireland
