= Bruno Schmidt =

Belgian chef and businessman (born 1968)

- Born: 1968; Belgium
- Occupation(s): former Chef, now director "Pro Bus and Car"
- Employer: Self-employed
- Known for: Michelin star

Bruno Schmidt (born 1968 in Belgium) is a former head chef.

During his tenure (1994-1999) at the Park Hotel Kenmare, he earned a Michelin star for his cooking for restaurant Park. In 1999 he left the culinary work to start an up market limousine company named "Pro Bus and Car Luxury Touring".

Bruno Schmidt is married and has six children.

== Awards ==
- Michelin star 1994-1999
