= Mews (restaurant) =

Restaurant in Baltimore, County Cork, Ireland

- Interactive map of Mews

Restaurant information
- Established: April 2015
- Closed: January 2020
- Owners: Robert Collender, James Ellis
- Head chef: Ahmet Dede
- Food type: Irish cuisine
- Rating: Michelin Guide
- Location: off Main Street, Baltimore, County Cork, P81 TC64, Ireland
- Coordinates: 51.483324°N 9.372803°W
- Seating capacity: 32
- Website: mewsrestaurant.ie

Mews was a restaurant in Baltimore, County Cork, Ireland. It was awarded a Michelin star in 2019.

Mews /ˈmjuːz/ (sometimes called The Mews) was opened in a former coachhouse by Robert Collender and James Ellis in 2015. Mews Restaurant was founded on the principle of exploring Irish cuisine through the ingredients of West Cork; Ahmet Dede was the Head Chef. All ingredients was sourced locally in the West Cork region.

Mews closed in January 2020, with head chef Ahmet Dede moving on to a new restaurant, Dede.

== Awards ==
- Michelin star: 2019, 2020

== See also ==
- List of Michelin starred restaurants in Ireland
