= Restaurant Chestnut =

Restaurant in Ballydehob, West Cork, Ireland

- Interactive map of Restaurant Chestnut

Restaurant information
- Established: 27 April 2018
- Owners: Rob Krawczyk and Elaine Fleming
- Head chef: Rob Krawczyk
- Food type: Irish cuisine
- Rating: Michelin Guide
- Location: Chestnut Tree, Staball Hill,, Ballydehob, County Cork, P81 X681, Ireland
- Coordinates: 51.562517°N 9.460627°W
- Seating capacity: 18
- Website: restaurantchestnutwestcork.ie

Restaurant Chestnut is a restaurant in Ballydehob, West Cork, Ireland. It was awarded a Michelin star for 2019.

The restaurant is based in the former Chestnut Tree pub. The head chef is Rob Krawczyk, a native of Schull.

== Awards ==
- Michelin star: since 2019

== See also ==
- List of Michelin starred restaurants in Ireland
