= Enda McEvoy =

Irish head chef (born 1977)

- Born: 1977 (age 48–49); Virginia, County Cavan, Ireland
- Occupation: Chef
- Known for: Michelin starred Aniar

Enda McEvoy (born 1977 in Virginia, County Cavan) is an Irish Michelin-*starred head chef with restaurant Loam in Galway.

== Background ==
McEvoy was born and raised in Virginia, County Cavan, where his parents had a supermarket. He had his first kitchen job in Germany at age 17, as kitchen porter. Later he returned to Ireland and studied English and Sociology at NUI Maynooth. Eventually, he decided to make cooking his career. As most chefs, McEvoy travelled wide and far to learn and train and he worked in Spain, Germany and the United Kingdom before returning to Galway. Here he worked at "Nimmo's Restaurant" and "Sheridan’s on the Docks", before moving on to Noma in Denmark. While working there, he was approached by JP McMahon and Drigín Gaffey, to come to work in their new restaurant Aniar.

== Personal ==
McEvoy is married and has four children.

== Awards ==
- 2012: Michelin star
- 2011: Bridgestone's Chef of the year
