= Lady Helen Restaurant =

Coordinates: 52°31′31″N 7°11′22″W

Lady Helen
- Interactive map of Lady Helen

Restaurant information
- Head chef: John Kelly
- Food type: Regional
- Rating: Michelin Guide
- Location: Mount Juliet, Thomastown, County Kilkenny, Thomastown, County Kilkenny, Ireland
- Seating capacity: 50
- Website: Official website

Lady Helen is the main restaurant in the Mount Juliet Golf & Spa Hotel in Thomastown, County Kilkenny Ireland. It is a fine dining restaurant that has been awarded one Michelin star.

The executive chef of Lady Helen is John Kelly. The restaurant is named after Lady Helen McCalmont of the McCalmont family, the last private owners of the Mount Juliet house.

== Awards ==
- Michelin star: since 2014
- 3 Rosettes: 2014–2019

== See also ==
- List of Michelin starred restaurants in Ireland
