= R350 road (Ireland) =

Road in Ireland

R350 road
- Bóthar R350

Route information
- Length: 12 km (7.5 mi)

Location
- Country: Ireland
- Primary destinations: County Galway; Loughrea - starts at Main St; Crosses the N4 Loughrea Bypass.; Bullaun – passes close to the Turoe stone; Terminates at the R348

Highway system
- Roads in Ireland; Motorways; Primary; Secondary; Regional

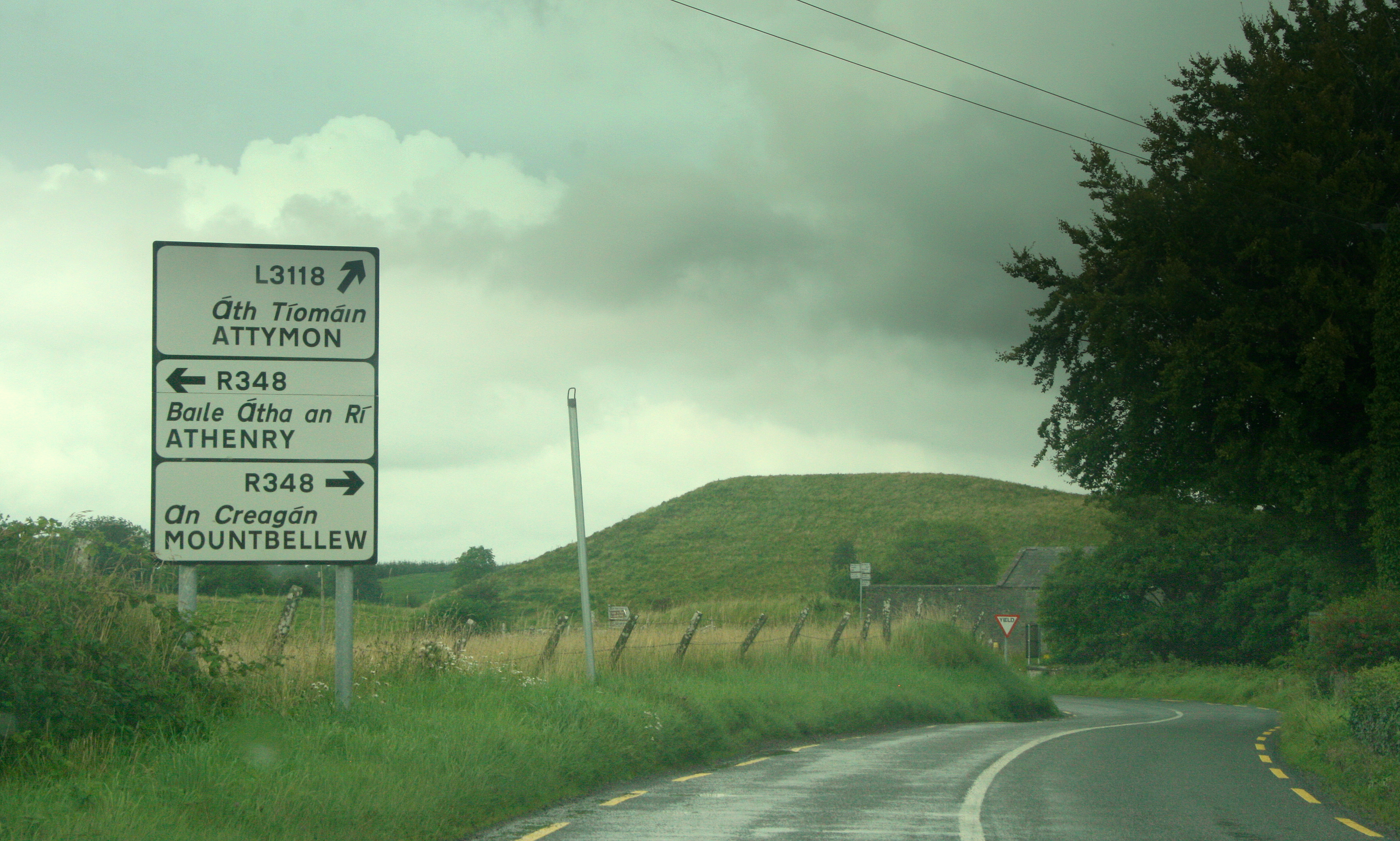
Sign on the R350 regional road Clickable image: click a name to go to its article

The R350 road is a regional road in Ireland starting in Loughrea Main St and going north for 12 km before terminating at the R348. En route it passes through Bullaun and passes close to the Turoe stone.

== See also ==
- Roads in Ireland
- National primary road
- National secondary road
