= Cashel Palace Hotel =

Luxury hotel in County Tipperary, Ireland

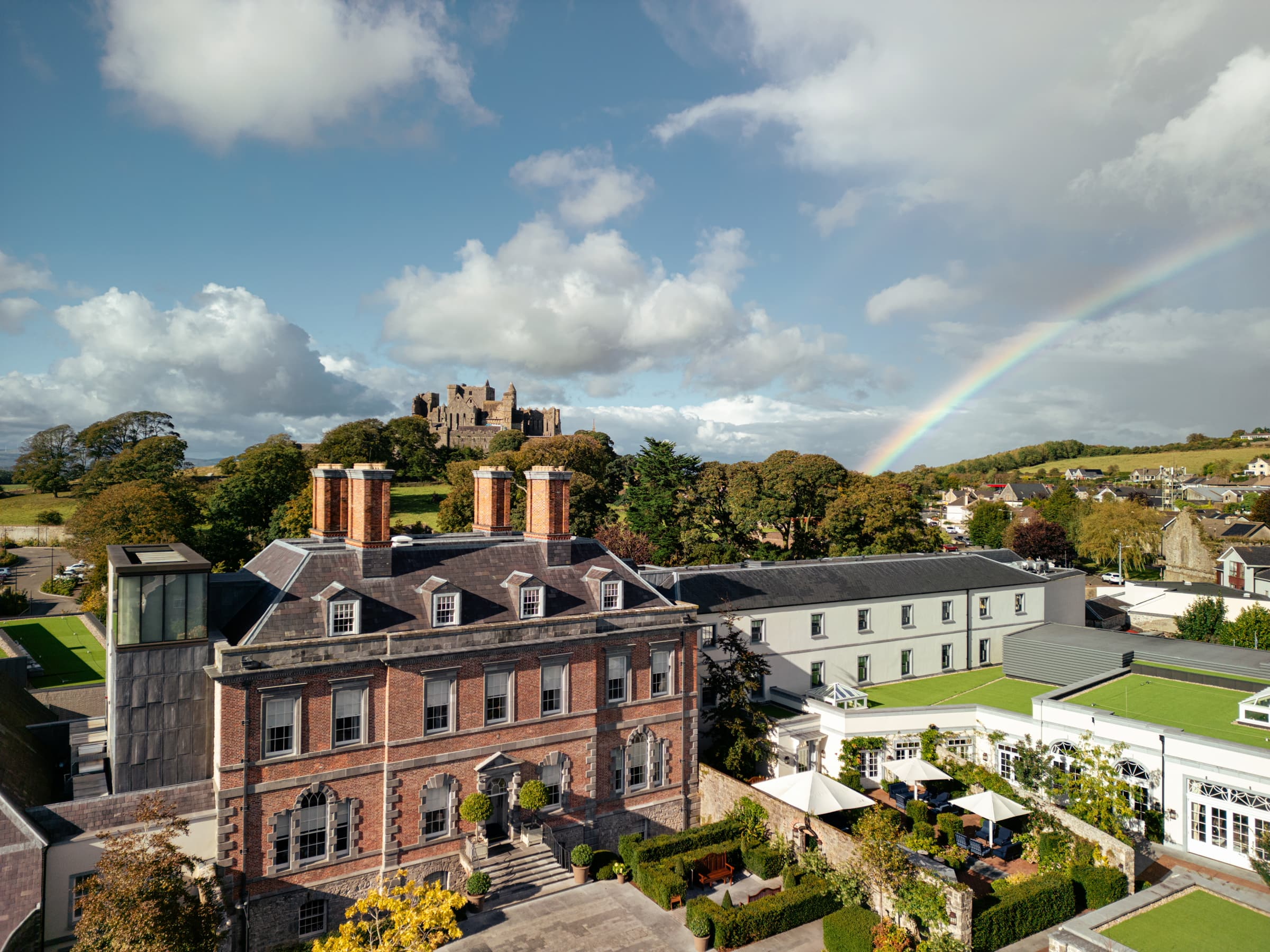
- Cashel Palace, with The Rock of Cashel in the Background
- Former names: Archbishop's Palace

General information
- Type: Boutique Manor Hotel
- Architectural style: Palladian, Queen Anne
- Location: Main Street, Cashel, County Tipperary, E25 EF61, Cashel, Ireland
- Coordinates: 52°30′57″N 7°53′23″W
- Completed: 1732
- Renovated: 2017–2022
- Owner: John Magnier
- Operator: Cashel Palace Hotel

Technical details
- Floor count: 4

Design and construction
- Architect: Edward Lovett Pearce
- Developer: Theophilus Bolton

Other information
- Number of rooms: 42
- Number of restaurants: 3
- Number of bars: 2

Website
- www.cashelpalacehotel.ie

The Cashel Palace Hotel is a five-star luxury hotel in Cashel, County Tipperary, Ireland. Located at the foot of the Rock of Cashel, the property occupies a restored 18th-century Palladian manor house originally constructed in 1732 as the residence of the Church of Ireland Archbishops of Cashel.

Following an extensive restoration and redevelopment project completed in 2022, the hotel reopened as a member of Relais & Châteaux. The property features 42 guestrooms and suites, landscaped gardens, a luxury spa, wellness facilities and multiple dining venues.

In 2024, Cashel Palace Hotel was awarded Two Michelin Keys by the Michelin Guide, recognising it as one of the leading luxury hospitality properties in Ireland.

== History ==
=== Archbishop's Palace ===
The building was commissioned around 1730 by Archbishop Theophilus Bolton and designed by architect Edward Lovett Pearce, one of the leading proponents of Palladian architecture in Ireland.

Constructed in red brick with limestone detailing, the building combines Palladian symmetry with elements associated with early Georgian and Queen Anne architecture. The residence served as the home of successive Church of Ireland Archbishops of Cashel until 1833, when the dioceses of Cashel and Emly were merged with Waterford and Lismore under the Church Temporalities Act.

The estate includes a private pathway known as the Bishop’s Walk, linking the palace grounds to the Rock of Cashel. The gardens also contain mulberry trees believed to date from 1702.

The property has historical associations with the Guinness family. Richard Guinness, steward to Archbishop Arthur Price, is believed to have brewed ale on the grounds using water from the palace well. Arthur Guinness, founder of the Guinness brewery at St James’s Gate in Dublin, was the Archbishop’s godson.

=== Hotel era ===
In 1959, the Church of Ireland sold the property to Lord Brockett, who converted it into a luxury hotel that opened in 1962.

Over subsequent decades the hotel became associated with Irish horse racing, society and international tourism. Notable guests included Jacqueline Kennedy, Richard Burton, Elizabeth Taylor, Ronald Reagan, Diana Spencer and Prince Joachim of Denmark.

The property later came under the ownership of champion racehorse trainer Vincent O’Brien before being acquired by local hoteliers Pat and Susan Murphy.

=== Restoration and reopening ===
The hotel ceased operations in 2014 and was acquired in 2016 by the Magnier family, owners of Coolmore Stud. A major restoration and expansion project commenced in 2017.

The restoration involved conservation architects, heritage specialists and local craftspeople. Original architectural features including Georgian wood panelling, staircases and limestone detailing were preserved, while new accommodation wings, gardens and wellness facilities were added.

The hotel officially reopened on 1 March 2022 as a five-star luxury property and joined the Relais & Châteaux association.

== Architecture and grounds ==
Cashel Palace Hotel is regarded as one of Ireland’s most significant surviving Palladian manor houses. Architectural features include Serlian windows, Corinthian columns, Georgian staircases and formal symmetry characteristic of the Palladian style.

The estate includes landscaped gardens overlooking the Rock of Cashel, featuring mature trees, formal lawns, terraces and water features.

== Accommodation and amenities ==
As of 2026, Cashel Palace Hotel comprises 42 guestrooms, of which 8 are suites, located within both the original manor house, newly constructed garden wings and restored avenue buildings - Carriage House, School House and Gate Lodge.

Facilities at the hotel include:

- Luxury spa and wellness centre
- Indoor swimming pool
- Thermal suite
- Sauna and steam room
- Seaweed bath experiences
- Fitness centre and yoga studio
- Ballroom and private event spaces
- Private dining facilities
- Landscaped gardens and terraces
- Concierge and curated guest experiences
- Direct private access to the Rock of Cashel

The property is associated with luxury heritage tourism, wellness travel and equestrian tourism in Ireland’s Ancient East region.

== Dining ==
=== The Bishop’s Buttery ===
The Bishop's Buttery
- Interactive map of The Bishop's Buttery

Restaurant information
- Established: 1962
- Food type: Modern Irish cuisine
- Rating: Michelin Guide

The Bishop’s Buttery is the hotel’s signature fine dining restaurant. The restaurant specialises in modern Irish cuisine with an emphasis on seasonal produce sourced from County Tipperary and the surrounding Golden Vale region.

The restaurant originally received a Michelin star in 1982 and 1983 under chef Declan Ryan. Following the reopening of Cashel Palace Hotel, the restaurant regained a Michelin star in the 2024 Michelin Guide for Great Britain and Ireland.

=== Other dining venues ===
The hotel also operates:

- The Guinness Bar, a heritage-style public bar
- A residents-only cocktail bar
- Casual dining and afternoon tea service
- Seasonal outdoor terrace dining

== Recognition ==
Cashel Palace Hotel has been featured in international travel and hospitality publications including Condé Nast Traveller, Forbes, and The Irish Times.

In 2024, the hotel received Two Michelin Keys from the Michelin Guide, recognising outstanding hospitality, architecture, service and guest experience.

== See also ==
- Rock of Cashel
- Relais & Châteaux
- List of Michelin starred restaurants in Ireland
- Edward Lovett Pearce
