= Sheen Falls Lodge =

Sheen Falls Lodge is a five-star 77-room hotel in County Kerry, Ireland.

The hotel was developed in the 1980s and opened in 1991; the property had a hunting lodge since the 1700s. It housed the restaurant La Cascade, which was awarded a Michelin star from 1993 to 1998.

It was sold in 2018 to a consortium of Thai investors.

It occupies a 300 acres (1.2 km^{2}) property on the River Sheen, and overlooks Kenmare Bay.
