= Ahakista =

Village in County Cork, Ireland

Ahakista Átha an Chiste
- Village
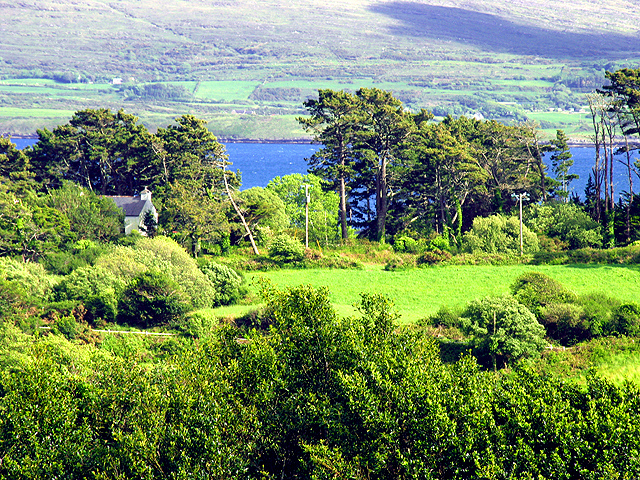
- Countryside near Ahakista

- Location in Ireland
- Coordinates: 51°36′N 9°38′W
- Country: Ireland
- Province: Munster
- County: County Cork
- Time zone: UTC+0 (WET)
  - Summer (DST): UTC+1 (IST (WEST))
- Irish grid reference: V869399

Ahakista (Irish: Átha an Chiste or Áth an Chiste) is located approximately halfway along the Sheep's Head peninsula between Durrus and Kilcrohane in County Cork, Ireland. It is a wooded coastal village with a deep and sheltered harbour.

== History ==
=== Archaeology ===
Evidence of ancient settlement in the area includes several ringfort and fulacht fiadh sites in the townlands of Dromnea, Rossnacaheragh and Gorteanish. A stone circle at Gorteanish dates to the Bronze Age (2200–600 B.C.). The Gorteanish stone circle, undocumented until the 1990s, was excavated and renovated in 2023.

=== Air India disaster ===
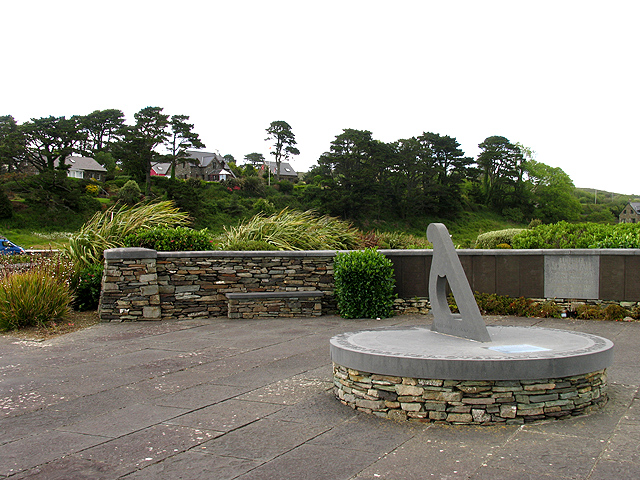
Air India Crash Memorial

The Air India Memorial Garden is located at Ahakista, and each June, the local community remembers the terrorist attack of 1985 that resulted in the deaths of over 300 people. On the morning of 23 June 1985, an Air India Boeing 747, flying from Canada to India, was approaching the southwest coast of Ireland when it was blown apart by a bomb, killing all 329 people on board.

In the days that followed, extensive searches resulted in the recovery of some of the victims' bodies, which were brought to Cork Regional Hospital. Shortly afterwards, relatives of the dead flew from India and Canada and travelled to be near the place where their loved ones died. They stopped at Ahakista and threw wreaths into the sea. They wished a memorial be erected, and Cork County Council subsequently purchased the site and built a memorial. It was officially opened on 23 June 1986 at a ceremony attended by the foreign ministers of Ireland, India and Canada.

A commemoration is held each year on the morning of 23 June. A sundial, designed by Cork sculptor Ken Thompson, is the garden's focal point, and the sun hits the dial at 08:00, the time of the explosion.

== Amenities and tourism ==
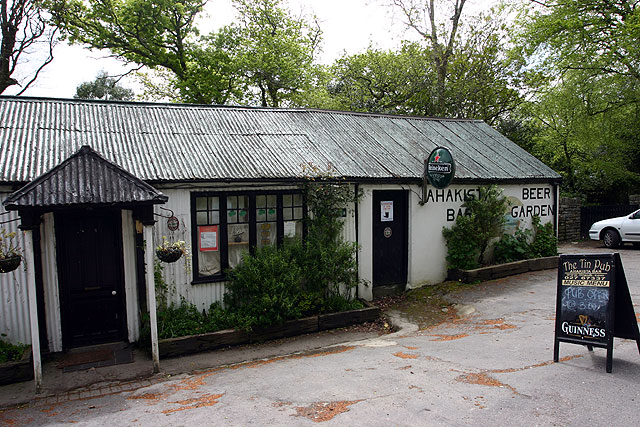
The 'tin pub'

Ahakista's church, St. Patrick's Roman Church at Rusnacahara, was built c. 1820.

There are two pubs in the area - both with beer gardens. One of these pubs, known locally as the 'tin pub', has a corrugated-iron roof and walls.

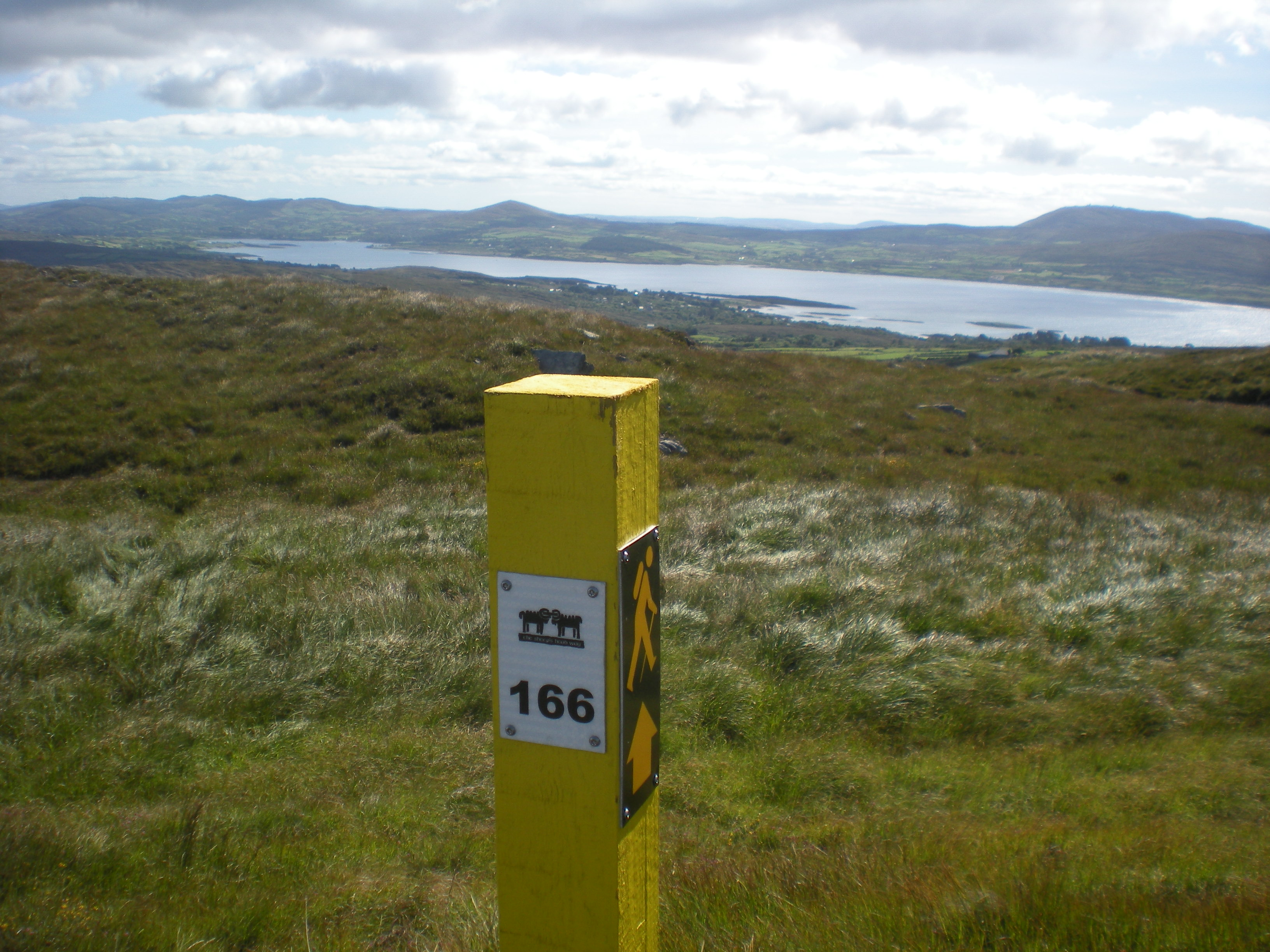
A marker of the Sheep's Head Way

Other amenities include a wine shop, two bed and breakfasts, several self-catering accommodations and a garden centre. There is a small sandy beach, and the 90 kilometres (56 miles) Sheep's Head Way marked trail passes through the village. In August 2008, this walkway became one of Ireland's first four publicly funded walkways, following an agreement between the Department of Rural Affairs and the Irish Farmers Association.

The deep water harbour at Ahakista is home to fishing boats and pleasure craft and hosts the annual Ahakista Regatta each August bank holiday weekend.

== Schools ==
Ahakista has a primary school and there is daily transportation to secondary schools in Bantry. The local primary school, Rusnachara National School, had 26 pupils as of 2013.

== Transport ==
A TFI Local Link bus service passes through Ahakista enroute from Kilcrohane to Allihies (via Bantry). The nearest major airport is Cork Airport.

== People ==
- Wolf Mankowitz (writer, playwright and screenwriter) lived for many years in Ahakista, till his death in 1998
- Noel Streatfeild (author) spent several summers in Ahakista. The screen version of her children's book "The Growing Summer" (also known as "The Magic Summer") was filmed in the area. Several scenes were shot in the actual places she had envisaged when writing the book. A six-episode television serial, released in 1969, starred Wendy Hiller as Aunt Dymphna and won a silver medal at the 1969 Venice Film Festival.
- Kei Pilz (Japanese chef) was co-owner of the Shiro restaurant in Ahakista
- Graham Norton (talk show host, comedian and author) owns a holiday home in Ahakista which overlooks the harbour and Dunmanus Bay.

== See also ==
- List of towns and villages in Ireland
