= Sébastien Masi =

French head chef and restaurateur

- Born: Clermont-Ferrand, France
- Occupations: Head chef, restaurateur
- Employer: Self-employed
- Known for: Michelin starred Locks Brasserie

Sébastien Masi (Clermont-Ferrand, France, 16 July 1974) is a French head chef and Michelin star-winning restaurateur with restaurant Locks Brasserie.

Masi emigrated to Ireland in 1994 to work and train at Restaurant Patrick Guilbaud. Later he worked in The Commons Restaurant. Due to head chefs leaving the restaurant, he became the head chef of a Michelin starred restaurant at the age of 22. He was not able to retain the star for 1998.

Masi left The Commons Restaurant in September 2000. In October 2000 he, and his partner Kirsten Batt, opened Pearl Brasserie in Merrion Street.

In 2010, Masi and Batt took ownership of Locks Brasserie in Portobello, Dublin. In September 2012, the brasserie was awarded a Michelin star. In July 2015, the brasserie was closed.
