= Matt Dowling (chef) =

Irish head chef

- Born: 1945 (age 80–81); Crumlin, Dublin
- Occupation: Chef
- Known for: Michelin star

Matt Dowling (born 1945 in Crumlin, Dublin) is an Irish head chef. He was leading the kitchen brigade of the Michelin-starred The Russell Hotel in Dublin, County Dublin, when it earned his star in 1974.

Dowling started his career as a 14-year-old boy, in 1960, as a kitchen hand in The Russell Hotel. After six months, he started his formal training and worked his way through the different parts of the kitchen. In 1965, he became a full chef. He was head chef in 1974 when The Russel Hotel earned his Michelin star, just before it closed.

After the closure of The Russel Hotel, Dowling moved to the "Sachs Hotel". He worked there for four years as head chef, until that hotel closed too. From there he went to Leinster House as a head chef. In 1980, Dowling left there to take up a position at a training school of CERT (now Failte Ireland). Around 1978, he took part in the "advanced cookery courses for senior chefs" from Jimmy Kilbride to modernise his skills and theoretical knowledge. In a later stage, Dowling was invited to do some television work. It turned out to become much more and he took part in TV-series as Ready Steady Cook and Live at 3. Dowling used those shows for the courses he was giving. Trainees would often help him with research and preparations, which served as a huge moral booster for the trainees.

In 1978, he joined the Panel of Chefs Ireland, an organization aiming to improve chef standards and to promote Irish food by taking part in (international) competitions.

As part of his job at Failte Ireland, Dowling often acts as judge in cooking competitions, like the Rotary Club Young Chef Competition.

Dowling was, as commis chef, involved in the state dinner for US president Kennedy during his visit to Ireland in 1963.

== Awards ==
- 1974: Michelin star, The Russell Hotel
- ?: Silver medal with the Panel of Chefs at the competition in (the??) Olympia
- ?: Gold medal with the Panel of chefs at the competition in Germany

== Personal ==
Dowling is married and has three children.
