= Gerry Kirwan =

Irish head chef

- Occupation: Chef
- Known for: Michelin star

Gerry Kirwan is an Irish head chef. He was the head chef of the Michelin-starred restaurant The Commons Restaurant on St. Stephen's Green in Dublin, Ireland. He was responsible for earning the star in 1994.

Kirwan worked in Jeddah in 1990. Due to the unrest caused by the First Gulf War he returned to Ireland and started working in The Commons Restaurant. In 1994 he earned there a Michelin star. Shortly after winning the star, he left restaurant to open his own restaurant in Athlone. In 1996 he closed this restaurant and went working for the "Rochestown Park Hotel" in Cork, County Cork.

During the skiing seasons 2009-2010 and 2010-2011 Kirwan worked at The Lodge in Zermatt, Switzerland.

== Awards ==
- Michelin star 1994 - The Commons Restaurant
