= Ichigo Ichie =

Japanese kaiseki restaurant in Cork, Ireland

- Interactive map of Ichigo Ichie

Restaurant information
- Established: April 2018
- Owner: Takashi Miyazaki
- Head chef: Takashi Miyazaki
- Food type: Japanese cuisine
- Rating: Michelin Guide
- Location: 5 Sheares Street, Cork, T12 RY7Y, Ireland
- Coordinates: 51.898039°N 8.479818°W
- Seating capacity: 25
- Other locations: Twinned with "Miyazaki", 1A Evergreen St, Cork
- Website: ichigoichie.ie

Ichigo Ichie is a Japanese kaiseki restaurant in Cork, Ireland. It was awarded a Michelin star for 2019.

The restaurant name alludes to the Japanese idiom Ichi-go ichi-e (一期一会), literally "one time, one meeting", reminding people to cherish any gathering that they may take part in, citing the fact that many meetings in life are not repeated. Even though the host and guests may see each other often socially, one day's gathering can never be repeated exactly. The phrase “ichigo-ichie” has two parts: “ichigo” means “one life” and “ichie” means “a one-time encounter.” And so this is often translated as “This is a once-in-a-lifetime opportunity.” This phrase originated with the tea ceremony, where it expresses the feelings of the host to show sincere hospitality towards guests.

From January 2024, it is now known as Ichigo Ichie Bistro and Natural Wine and has a more casual dining model.

== Awards ==
- Michelin star: since 2019

== See also ==
- List of Michelin starred restaurants in Ireland
