= Lignum (restaurant) =

Restaurant in County Galway, Ireland

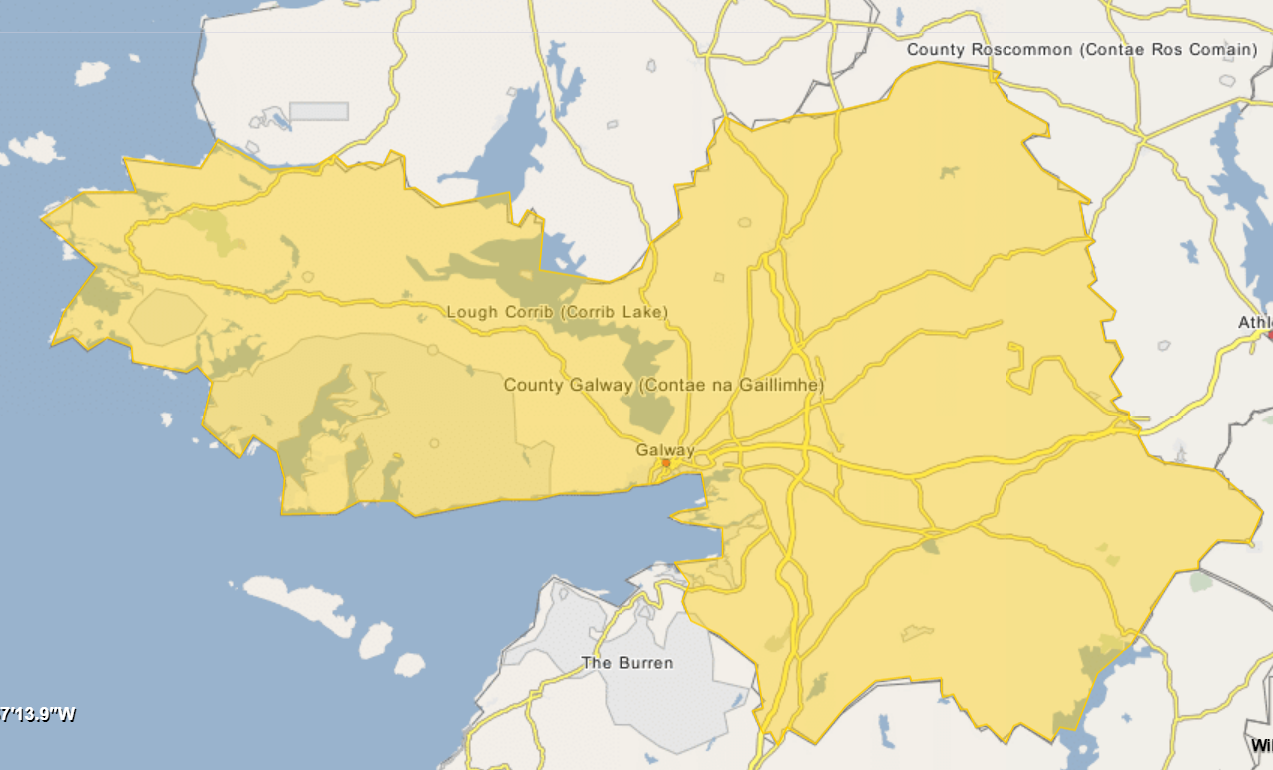
- Location within County Galway

Restaurant information
- Established: September 27, 2019
- Owner: Danny Africano
- Head chef: Danny Africano
- Food type: Irish
- Rating: Michelin Guide
- Location: Slatefort House, Bullaun, County Galway, H62 H798, Ireland
- Coordinates: 53°14′10″N 8°33′10″W
- Reservations: Yes
- Website: lignum.ie

Lignum (stylised as LIGИUM) is a restaurant in County Galway, Ireland. It was awarded its first Michelin star in 2025.

== History ==
Lignum was opened by Italian–Irish Danny Africano in Slateford House, 4 km (2.5 mi) north of Loughrea and 32 km (20 mi) east of Galway City, in 2019. Its centerpiece is a wood-burning oven; the name is Latin for "wood."

Lignum won Irish Restaurant of the Year in 2022 and received a Michelin star in 2025.

== Awards ==
Michelin star (2025–present)

== See also ==
- List of Michelin-starred restaurants in Ireland
