= Ultan Cooke =

Irish head chef

- Born: Galway
- Occupation: Head chef
- Known for: Michelin starred Aniar
- Predecessor: Enda McEvoy

Ultan Cooke (Galway, County Galway) is an Irish head chef. He was formally employed at restaurant Aniar in Galway where he was awarded a Michelin star. Cooke studied philosophy and archaeology at the National University of Ireland, Galway. He started his culinary training in Galway. He later moved to London where he worked for John Torode's Smiths of Smithfield, ending up as head chef. He worked at Aniar in the period 2013-2015 and then moved to Ballynahinch Castle.

Cooke is married and has one son. He returned to Galway for family reasons, and the job at Aniar made it extra interesting.

== Awards ==
- Michelin star: 2014
