= Loam (restaurant) =

Coordinates: 53.274438°N 9.044740°W

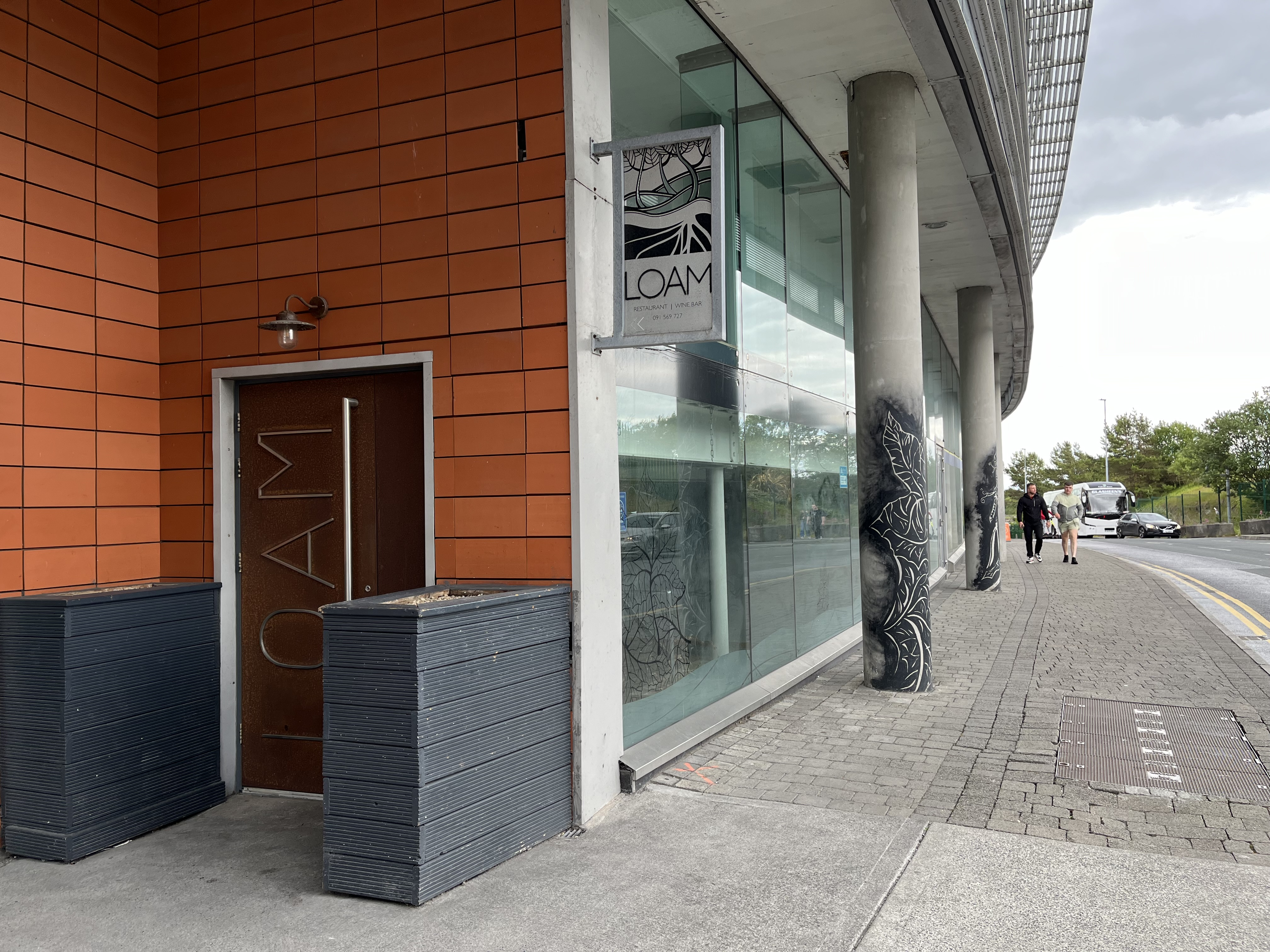
- Interactive map of Loam

Restaurant information
- Established: 2013
- Closed: September 2022
- Owner: Enda McEvoy
- Head chef: Enda McEvoy
- Food type: Irish cuisine
- Rating: Michelin Guide
- Location: Geata na Cathrach, Fairgreen, Galway, County Galway, H91 W26K, Ireland
- Website: loamgalway.com

Loam was a restaurant and wine bar in Galway, Ireland. It had one Michelin star from 2016 to 2022. In 2023, co-owner Enda McEvoy announced that the restaurant would not be reopening again, after closing its doors in September 2022, citing staff shortages and spiralling costs as reasons behind the decision.

== Awards ==
- Michelin star: 2016–2022
- National Hospitality Awards, 2015: Best Dining Experience
- Irish Restaurant Awards 2015: Best Emerging Irish Cuisine

== See also ==
- List of Michelin starred restaurants in Ireland
