= Bullaun, County Galway =

Village in County Galway, Ireland

Bullaun An Ballán
- Village
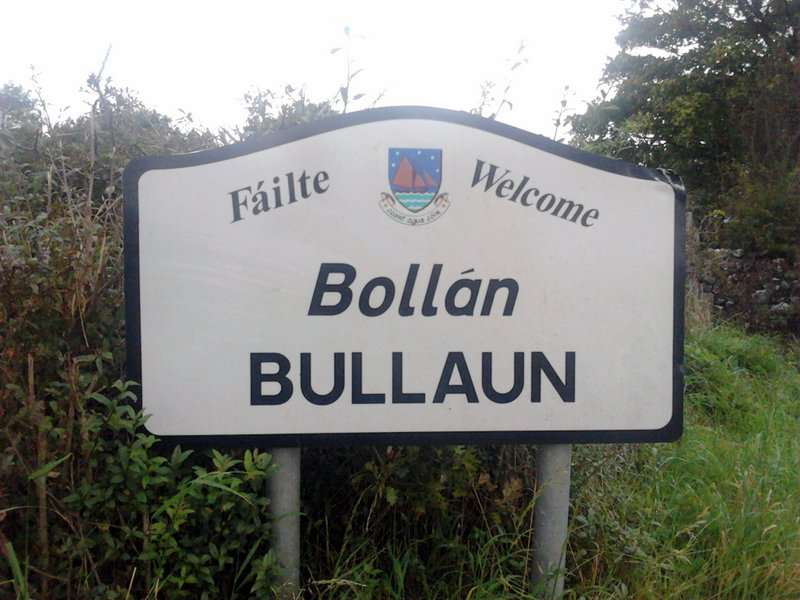
- Bullaun road signage, on the R350 road

- Location in Ireland
- Coordinates (Village square): 53.248°N 8.555°W
- Country: Ireland
- Province: Connacht
- County: Galway
- Constituency: Galway East

Area
  - Total: 0.58 km^{2} (0.22 sq mi)
- Time zone: UTC0 (GMT)
  - Summer (DST): UTC+1 (BST)

Bullaun (Irish: An Ballán) is a village in east County Galway, Ireland. It lies 6 km (4 mi) northeast of Loughrea on the R350 regional road. The village is in a townland and civil parish of the same name.

The townland of Lakafinna, to the south of Bullaun, contains the local water scheme and an old castle. According to local folklore, an unused tunnel runs from the castle to a point close to a house in Ballyara. The river which flows through Bullaun previously contained quantities of fresh water salmon. These salmon stocks have, however, been impacted by overfishing and pollution.

The village also contains St Patrick's church, a pub called the Harbour Bar and is home to the Corcoran's Turoe stone. The home ground for the Sarsfields GAA team is in Bullaun.

The Michelin starred restaurant Lignum is also located near Bullaun.

== See also ==
- List of towns and villages in Ireland
