= L'Ecrivain =

Restaurant in Dublin, Ireland

Coordinates: 53.3362°N 6.2486°W

l'Ecrivain
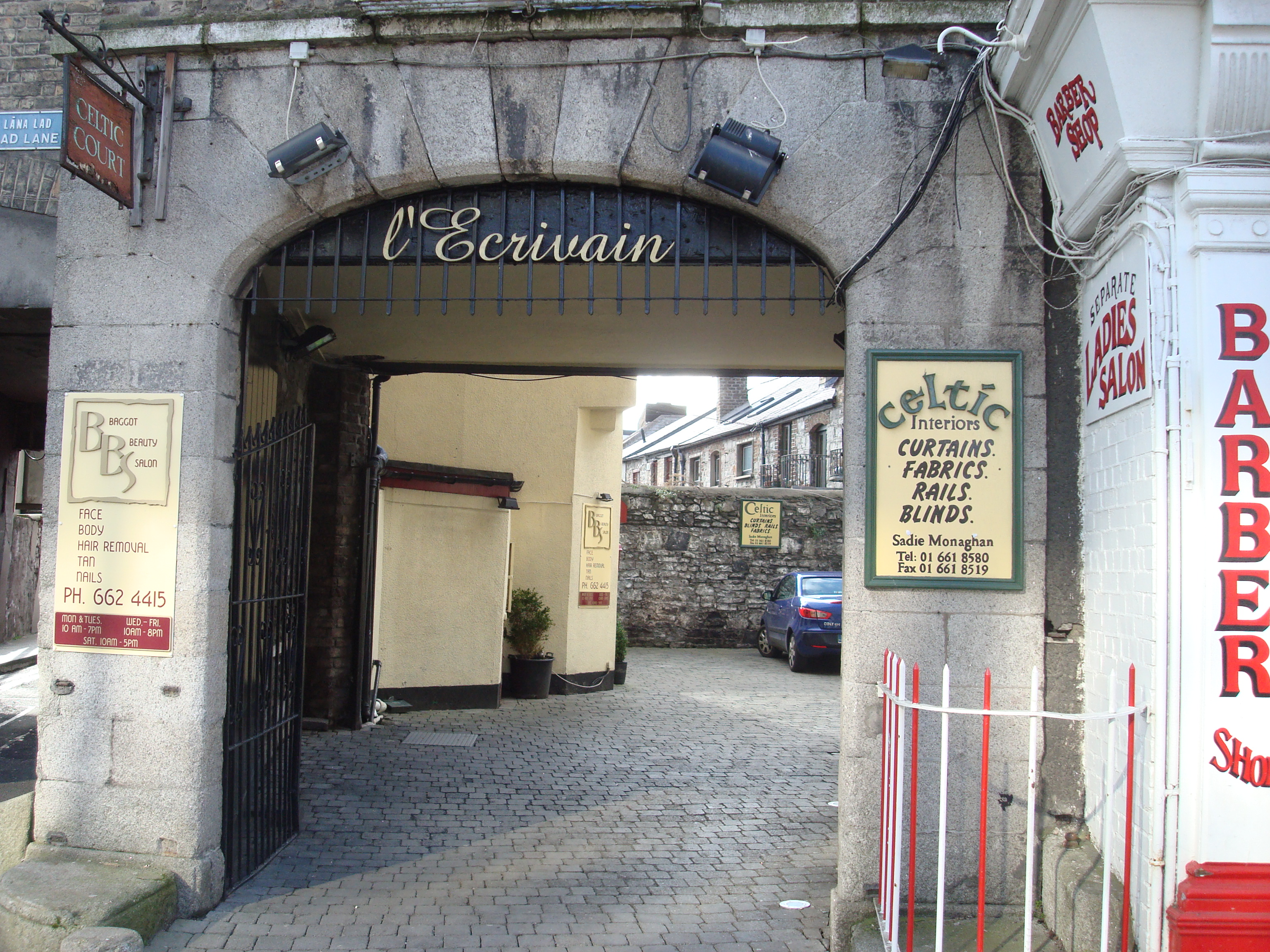
- L'Ecrivain, Lower Baggot Street
- Interactive map of l'Ecrivain

Restaurant information
- Established: 1989
- Closed: 2021
- Head chef: Derry Clarke
- Food type: Irish and French
- Rating: Michelin Guide
- Location: 109A Lower Baggot Street, Dublin, Ireland
- Website: lecrivain.com

L'Ecrivain (French pronunciation: [le.kʁi.vɛ̃], meaning "The Writer") was a restaurant on Lower Baggot Street in Dublin, Ireland, which was awarded one Michelin star from 2003 to 2020. The Michelin Guide awarded the restaurant the "Red M", indicating "good food at a reasonable price", from 1996 to 1999.

The restaurant's proprietor was Irish celebrity chef Derry Clarke, who has appeared on such television programmes as The Restaurant, The Afternoon Show and The Panel (in 2008) and has also been a judge on the reality television series Fáilte Towers. L'Ecrivain was described as "Dublin's corporate canteen" by the Irish Independent. The restaurant was opened in 1989 by Derry Clarke and his wife Sallyann. It closed in March 2021.

== Style ==
L'Ecrivain's specialty was both Irish and French cuisine.
