= Egon Ronay =

Hungarian-born food critic

- Born: Egon Miklos Ronay; 24 July 1915; Bratislava, Austria-Hungary
- Died: 12 June 2010 (aged 94); Yattendon, Berkshire, England
- Occupation: Food critic
- Notable work: Guidebooks to British and Irish restaurants and hotels
- Children: 2 daughters, Esther & Edina Ronay, and adopted son, Gerard Ronay

Egon Miklos Ronay (24 July 1915 – 12 June 2010) was a Hungarian-born food critic who wrote and published a series of guides to British and Irish restaurants and hotels in the 1950s, 1960s and 1970s. His guidebooks are credited with raising the quality of British cooking offered in public eating places. He also championed foreign cuisine to British diners.

== Early life ==
Ronay refused to disclose his date of birth in public records, including his Who's Who entry and CBE Honours Nomination Form. This is speculated to be due to his complex history, including his involvement as an enemy combatant during World War II.

Born around 1915 in Bratislava, Austria-Hungary, the only child of former Royal Hungarian Army captain Miklos Ronay, a restaurateur, his grandfather, Nikolaus von (Miklos) Ronay, established the Grand Hotel at Piešťany, now Slovakia. The family moved to Budapest when he was two, and with the onset of World War II, he was commissioned in the Hungarian Army serving with the occupying forces after the First and Second Vienna Awards in southern Slovakia and northern Transylvania. Ronay claimed to have deserted the army in 1943.

The Ronay family business suffered during wartime, and was taken over by the Communists once Hungary fell under Soviet control after the defeat of the Nazis.

== Career ==
Ronay emigrated to London, England alone on 10 October 1946. His father's contacts arranged for him to manage Princes restaurant in Piccadilly, and then the Carousel Club in St James's. He then borrowed £4,000 and took over The Marquee, a 39-seat former tea room, near Harrods, putting classic French dishes on the menu, which was unusual for post-war Britain.

After TV chef Fanny Cradock visited with her husband, Johnnie, Ronay built up contacts with the press, and later began to write a food column for The Daily Telegraph.

In his later years, Ronay acted as food consultant for pub chain J D Wetherspoon. He also worked with motorway service station company Welcome Break to promote their products.

Awarded the Médaille de la Ville de Paris in 1983, he was appointed a Chevalier of the Order of Agricultural Merit in 1987 and was a Chevalier du Tastevin.

== Egon Ronay's Guide ==
In 1957, Ronay completed the first edition of the Egon Ronay's Guide to British Eateries, selling 30,000 copies. The guides gained in popularity and it became a mark of distinction to be mentioned in the books. His guides made a point of not accepting advertising or hospitality from hotels and restaurants to ensure impartiality.

Ronay sold the rights to his books to The AA in 1985. However, after subsequent owner Leading Guides International went into bankruptcy in 1997, Ronay took legal action to reclaim the rights. In 2005, in conjunction with the Royal Automobile Club, Ronay brought out Egon Ronay's RAC Guide to the Top 200 Restaurants in the UK, basing the reviews on comments received by restaurant inspectors.

== Personal life ==
Twice married, he divorced Edit (m. 1935) in 1967, when he married the painter, Barbara Greenslade, and adopted her son, Gerard, in 1974. His younger daughter Edina Ronay (born 1943), who dated Michael Caine, is a former actress and fashion designer. His elder daughter, Esther (1940–2025), was a BBC television editor and independent documentary producer. Ronay died at his Berkshire home in Yattendon on 12 June 2010 after a short illness.
