= Skirts and kidneys =

Irish stew

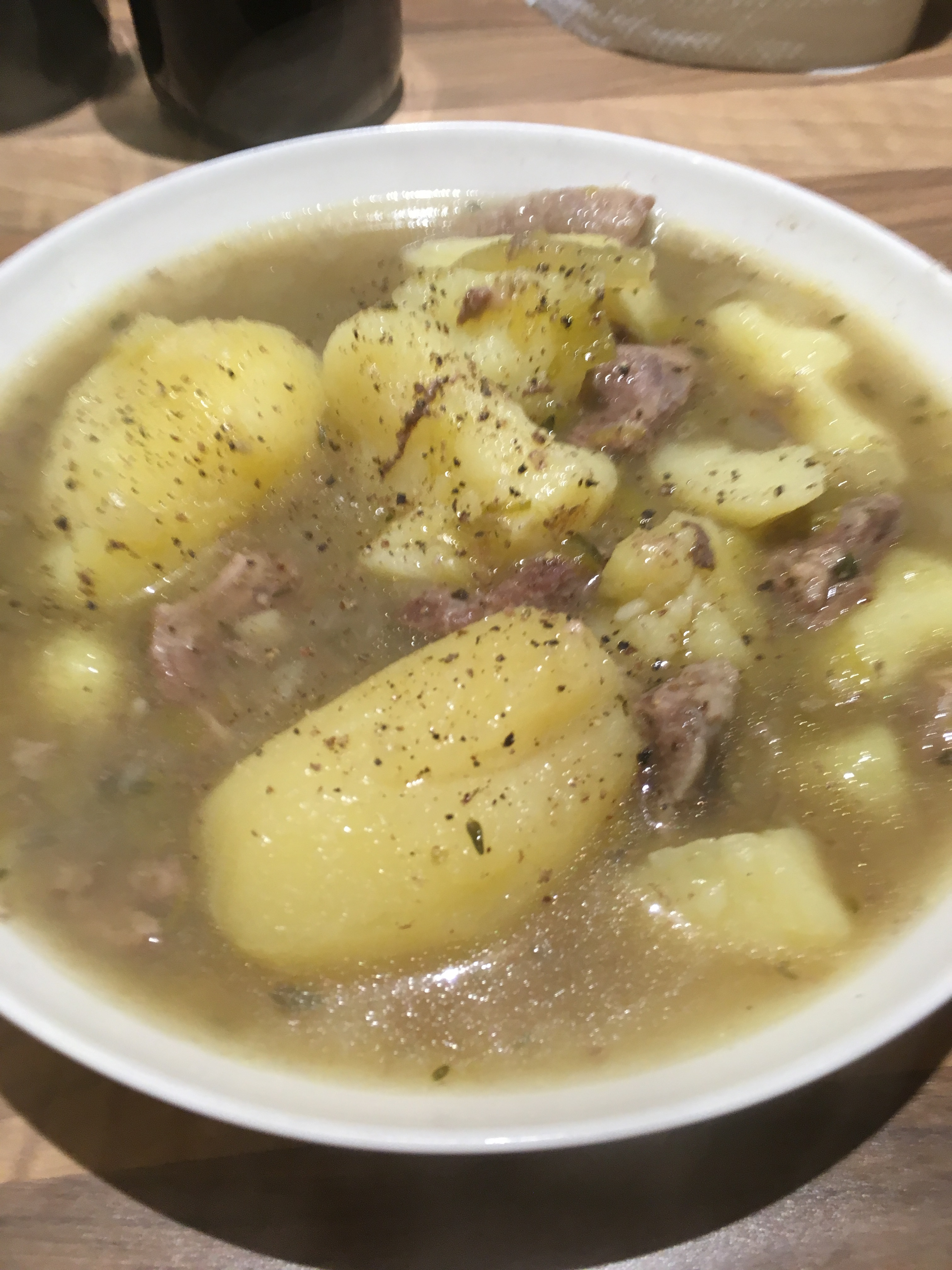
- A typical dish of Skirts and Kidneys from Cork
- Type: Stew
- Place of origin: Ireland
- Main ingredients: Pork, pork kidneys

Skirts and kidneys (Irish: íochtar an chliatháin agus duáin) is an Irish stew made from pork and pork kidneys.

== History ==
Cork, on the southern coast of Ireland, has a long-standing association with animal produce and, from the 17th century to the end of the 19th century, was a major supplier of butter and salted (preserved) beef and pork to the British Empire and specifically the armed forces. The beef and pork industry meant a plentiful supply of offal. Offcuts were available at affordable prices for local consumption by the poor and underprivileged. An entire Cork cuisine developed based on offal – particularly pig offal. Examples include Crubeens/cruibín (pigs' trotters); pigs' tails; drisheen – a boiled blood sausage traditionally served with tripe; bodice – plain or salted pig ribs, cooked as a simple white stew, or as a salted bacon dish cooked with cabbage and turnip. In Cork, the word offal came to mean one specific dish – pig's backbone. Now illegal to use because of BSE, it was cooked either salted or as a white stew.

The meat ingredients for skirts and kidneys can be bought generally in any pork butcher's shop. Skirts are the trimmings from the around the diaphragm. While the meat is thin, it is quite tender. It is encased in a tough white membrane which needs to be stripped off before cooking. Kidneys need to be carefully washed in copious amounts of fresh water to ensure that all traces of urine are washed away.

The dish is a basic white stew made with a few simple ingredients: skirts, kidneys, onions, thyme, salt, white pepper, water, and potatoes. All the ingredients are placed in a large saucepan of boiling water and slowly simmered for about two hours. At the end of cooking, if necessary, a little cornflour (cornstarch) mixed as a slurry with a little water can be stirred in as thickening.

A Waterford variant involves dicing the onion quite small and excluding the thyme and salt, instead opting for generous amounts of white pepper.

The meal is often served with crusty white bread to soak up the juices.

== See also ==
- List of Irish dishes
- List of stews
