= Irish cuisine =

Culinary traditions of Ireland

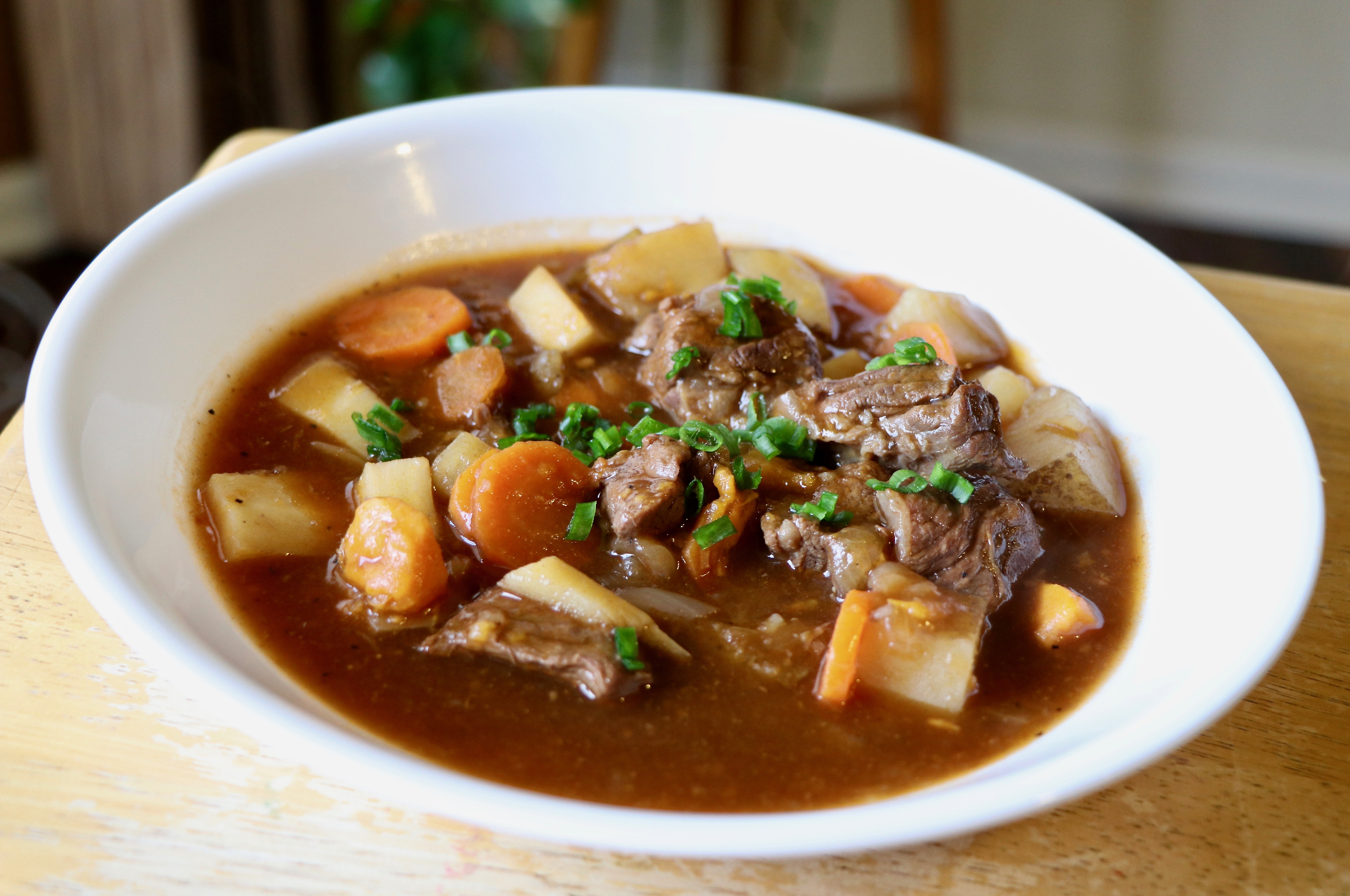
Irish stew (Irish: stobhach), made with beef

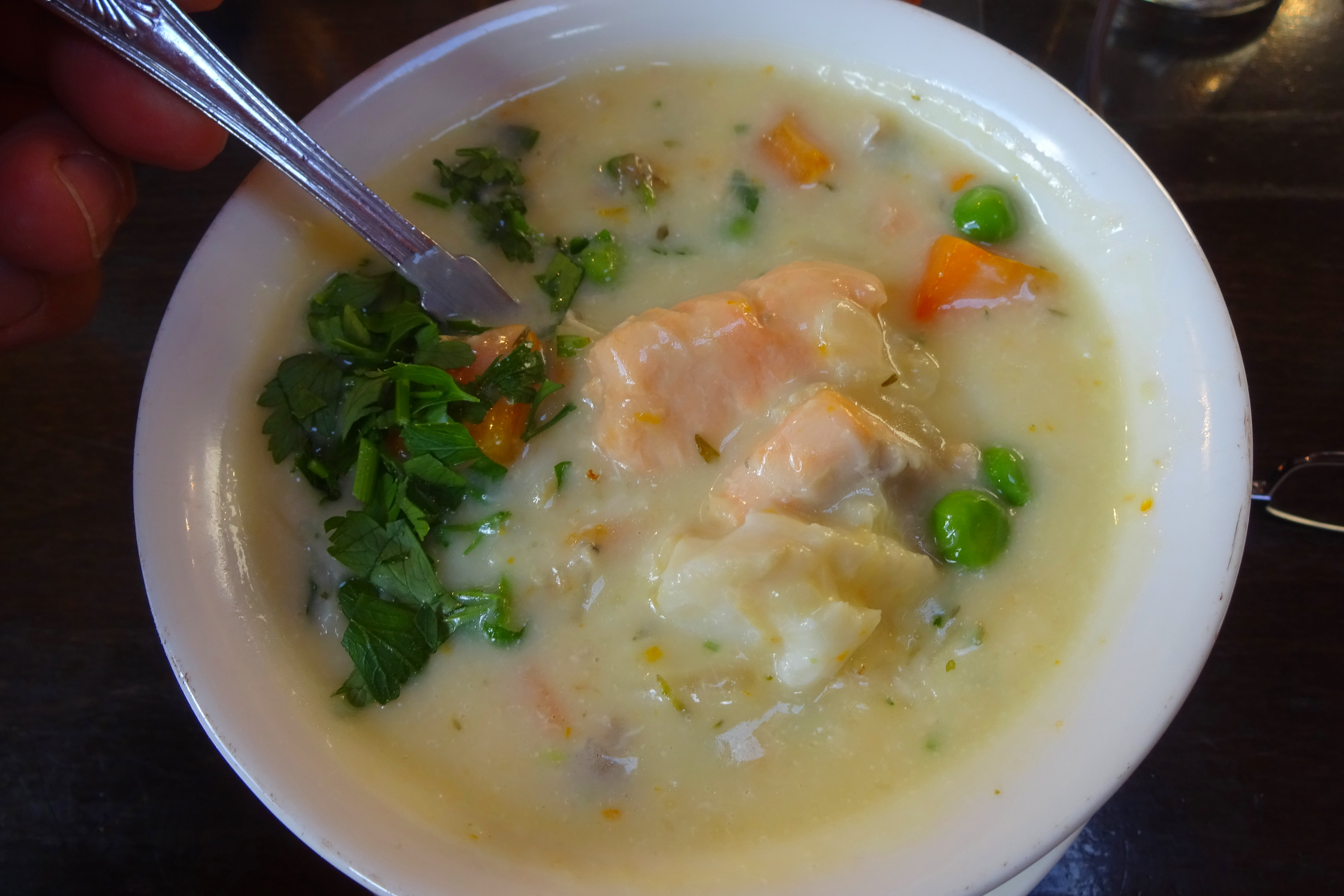
Seafood chowder, a popular dish in Ireland

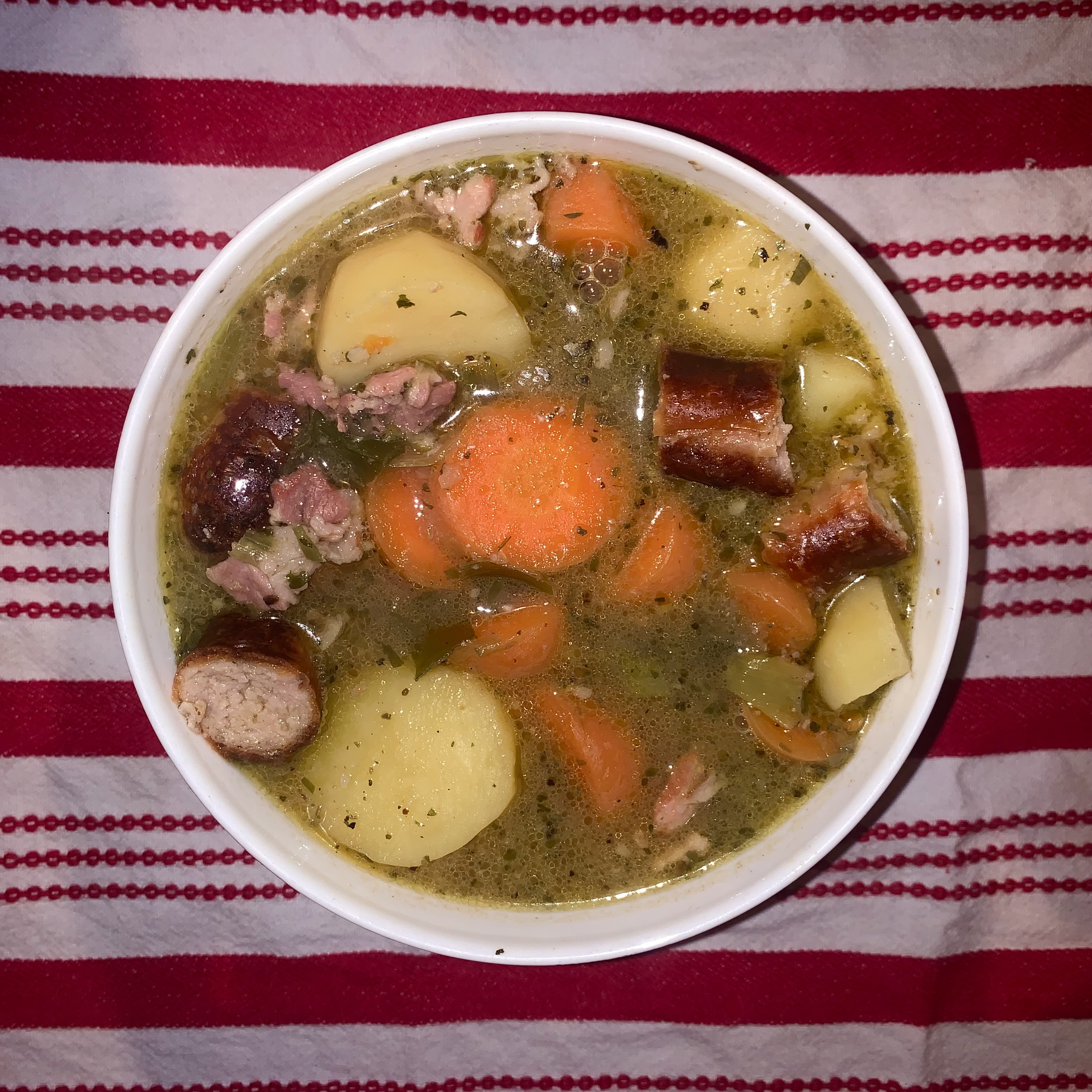
Coddle, made with pork sausages and bacon

Irish cuisine encompasses the cooking styles, traditions and recipes associated with the island of Ireland. It has developed from antiquity through centuries of social and political change and the mixing of different cultures, predominantly with those from nearby Britain and other European regions. The cuisine is founded upon the crops and animals farmed in its temperate climate and the abundance of fresh fish and seafood from the surrounding waters of the Atlantic Ocean. Chowder, for example, is popular around the coasts. Herbs and spices traditionally used in Irish cuisine include bay leaves, black pepper, caraway seeds, chives, dill, horseradish, mustard seeds, parsley, ramsons (wild garlic), rosemary, sage and thyme.

The development of Irish cuisine was altered greatly by the Tudor conquest of Ireland in the late 16th and early 17th centuries, which introduced a new agro-alimentary system of intensive grain-based agriculture and led to large areas of land being turned over to grain production. The rise of a commercial market in grain and meat altered the diet of the Irish populace by redirecting traditionally consumed products (such as beef) abroad as cash crops instead. Consequently, potatoes were widely adopted in the 18th century and essentially became the main crop that the Irish working class (which formed a majority of the population) could afford.

By the 21st century, much traditional Irish cuisine was being revived. Representative dishes include Irish stew, bacon and cabbage, boxty, brown bread (as it is referred to in the south) or soda bread (predominantly used in Ulster), coddle, and colcannon.

== History ==
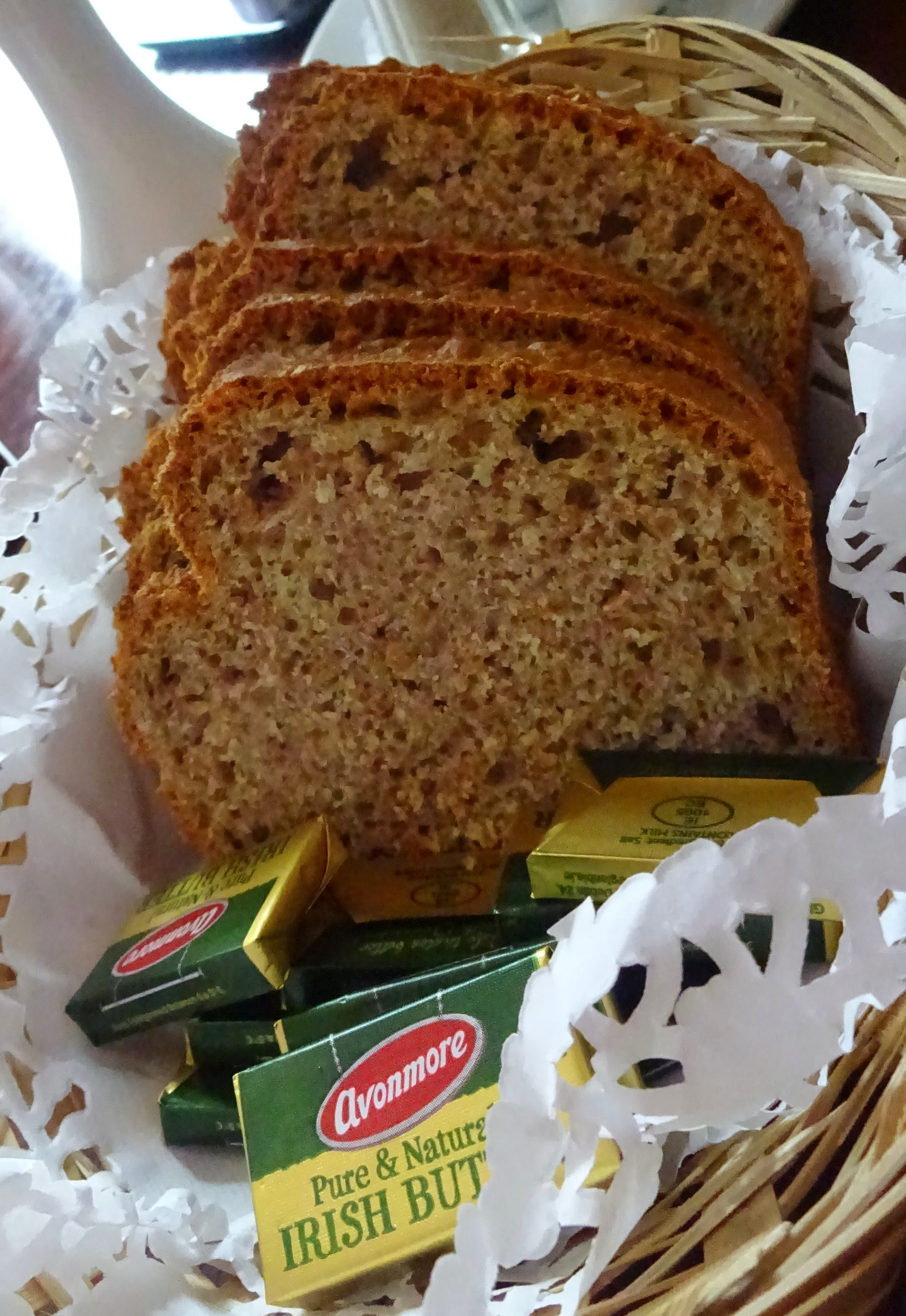
Traditional Irish wheaten soda bread with Irish butter

There are many references to food and drink in Irish mythology and early Irish literature, such as the tale of Fionn mac Cumhaill and the Salmon of Knowledge. They contain many references to banquets involving the heroes' portion and meat cooked in cauldrons and on spits.

=== Prehistoric Ireland ===
==== Mesolithic period (8000–4000 BC) ====
Prior to the Neolithic period in Ireland and advances in farming technology, archaeological evidence such as the discovery of stone tools, bone assemblages, archeobotanical evidence, isotopic analysis of human skeletal remains, and dental erosion on the remains of human teeth indicate the Mesolithic Irish were a hunter-gatherer society that ate a diet of varied floral and faunal sources. Discoveries of food byproducts such as bone fragments and sea shells are key indicators of the dietary habits of the Mesolithic Irish, as immediate food products have long since decomposed —especially in the presence of Ireland's largely acidic soils. However, available archeological evidence of food remains, together with discoveries of Mesolithic food-harvesting tools and the relationship of local environments with settlement sites, provide an understanding of what may have eaten. Settlement sites, in particular, have supported notable insight into the dietary habits of the Mesolithic Irish. For example, the proximity of Mesolithic settlements to water systems point to groups or individuals who ate marine species. The predominant location of Mesolithic Irish settlements are close to water systems, and therefore suggests a diet rich in vegetation, marine life, and smaller mammals, as distinct from their British and Native American contemporaries whose settlements further inland influenced a diet more substantive with meat. For example, deer features minimally in archeological discoveries, thought to be particularly due to the infrequent presence of deer along coastal regions, bays, and estuaries.

The deliberate positioning of such settlements also suggests a cultural preference for particular foods. Also unique to settlements positioned close to water systems are large mounds of bivalve shells known as middens, which provide concrete evidence that shellfish played a role in the dietary practices of the Mesolithic Irish. Shell middens are frequent Mesolithic discoveries in Ireland, which for their majority, were predominantly composed of oyster and limpet shells. The coastal town name of Sligo (in Irish Sligeach) which means "abounding in shells", references the area's historic plenitude of shellfish in the river and its estuary, as well as the middens common to the area.

Additionally, Ireland's position as an island and thus the unique composition of biodiversity and geography suggests its Mesolithic people enjoyed a somewhat dissimilar diet to their proximal contemporaries. For example, prehistoric Ireland's paucity of small mammals, and its absences of species important to other Mesolithic communities, such as red deer, wild cow, and elk would have contributed to unique dietary habits and nutritional standards. The persistent evidence of certain species, such as boar in contrast with the scarcity and/or uncooked nature of other animal remains such as bear and birds of prey (remains of which have been found in Mesolithic bone assemblages, but are otherwise absent in isotopic analysis of human bones) suggests a particular understanding of certain animals as sources of food, others that served symbolic or medicinal purposes (as they were in other parts of Europe), while others still, such as dog, which are not supposed to have been consumed at all.

Due to Ireland's geography and the locations of Mesolithic settlements, the variety of food sources available to the Mesolithic Irish was consequently unique. Outside of boar, large predators including the wolf, the brown bear, and lynx are scarce in archaeological assemblages, and understood to have been generally avoided as a source of food, as they were in most of contemporary Mesolithic Europe. Likewise, while cereals were unlikely to have been yet consumed due to the processing required to make them digestible, fungi, roots, leaves, stems, flowers, nuts, seeds, berries and fruits were all otherwise simple to harvest and eat and would have substantiated the Mesolithic diet with nutritional variety and a diversity of flavour. Honeybees, and their honey, were probably not present in Mesolithic Ireland.

This in combination with the prevalence of settlements along waterways suggests key dietary staples of the Mesolithic Irish were marine and floral sources of food. Additionally, that boar was brought to Ireland by early Mesolithic colonists and features frequently in archeological assemblages of faunal bones, points to another noteworthy staple in the Mesolithic Irish diet. Despite the scarcity of plant-based artifacts in light of Ireland's wet weather and acidic soil, biochemical assessments of human bone have been used to provide evidence for a variety of floral sources, including apples, crowberries, raspberries, blackberries, water-lily seeds, tubers, and hazelnuts.

The sizable presence of hazelnuts in many archaeological assemblages in both Mesolithic Ireland and Britain suggests the nut was important, and may have even been used as a form of currency, as acorns were for Native Americans of California during the same period. There is an indication that these nuts, in particular, were stored underground during the winter months. Elm bark is also suspected to have been a prized source of food for being particularly rich in nutrients, as well as featuring in the diets of other northern Mesolithic European communities, the Scandinavian in particular.

Despite Ireland's coastal geography, there is no evidence of seaweed collection among the Mesolithic Irish in archaeological remains, as well as little evidence of deep-water ocean species. However, the presence of shellfish and in-shore fish—particularly salmonids—in the Irish Mesolithic diet is impressive. The absence of evidence for seal is a notable contrast with Mesolithic Scotland, where archaeological sites demonstrate the significant exploitation of seals.

Though the Mesolithic Irish were a hunter-gatherer people, such assemblages as middens, discoveries of lithic tools and technologies, and seasonal organization of animal remains alludes to understandings of environmental management to meet subsistence needs. For example, the transportation and management of boar through selective hunting and culling techniques suggests a food source potentially purposefully semi-domesticated, as well as a species important to the Mesolithic communities of Ireland. Research into the composition of middens, as well, suggests that these Irish communities understood tidal behaviours, and optimal harvest periods for respective marine species. Different species of shellfish require different environmental conditions, such as intertidal flats for mussels and cockles, and rocky shorelines for limpets so different harvesting strategies would have been required to harvest and profit from different varieties of shellfish. As well, that freshwater, coastal, and in-shore marine life features greater than deep-sea species in archaeological evidence of the Irish Mesolithic diet inherently points to the use of in-shore fishing techniques such as traps and nets, in lieu of off-shore or deep-sea hunting techniques.

The recovery of stone tools in specific sites and vogue technologies of the period such as blade-and-flake likewise suggests their roles in the construction and maintenance of basic food procurement technologies like fish traps. There is even some suggestion of the Mesolithic Irish being actively engaged in land snail farming.

The fundamentally seasonal nature of the Mesolithic diet and the various seasonally-conscripted food-gathering activities affected the time and social organization of the Mesolithic Irish during the year. Such activities would have consisted the hunting and foraging of seasonal plants and animals when they were at their most abundant, as well as storage-related activities such as preserving meat and seafood through smoking, and caching nuts and seeds. As various plants are fertile only biannually, and the migratory patterns of animals can change over time, these food-gathering activities would have been significantly varied and as such, would have required attention and understanding of environmental and animal behaviours.

While most foods would have been eaten raw and out-of-hand, archaeological evidence has provided insight into Mesolithic food processing techniques, such as crude forms of butchery, the soaking of seeds, and thermal processing to directly heat or smoke foods. At a site in Kilnatierney where ash, burnt shells, fish, and pig bones were discovered in a dug-out depression, the diminutive size of the fish bones suggests they were cooked on skewers or directly on hot rocks. The presence of burnt mounds of stones indicate cooking methods likely focused on direct heating methods such as roasting on spits constructed on tripods over open flames, and in earthen hearths.

==== Neolithic period (4000-2500 BC) ====
Understanding the details about the foodways of the prehistoric Irish can be difficult to capture, especially given the island's temperate climate and prevalence of wet, acidic soils that are quick to erode organic material, but thanks to extensive evaluation of biochemical and isotopic signatures recovered from human bone and pottery sherds, there is insight into Neolithic dietary habits. Biomarkers such as lipid and plant residues preserved in the clay matrix of pottery vessels observe a diversity of plant- and animal-life in the diet of the Neolithic Irish, including berries, leafy vegetables, tubers, legumes, meats, seafoods, and nuts. These in combination with the agricultural developments of the Neolithic period such as field systems, farming tools, and animal husbandry begin to describe the dramatic changes in the dietary practices and eating behaviours of the prehistoric Irish people, distinct from their Mesolithic ancestors. This did not include honeybees; there is no evidence of beeswax in Neolithic pottery vessels in Ireland, although such evidence is widespread across Europe as close as the lower reaches of the Thames. Neolithic cire perdue bronze castings from this period are very few in Ireland.

The cultivation and processing of cereals, as well as the maintenance of livestock in farming scenarios saw the significant consumption of new foods, particularly emmer wheat, barley, beef, pig, and goat, which coincided with a steep decline in the consumption of marine life. Emmer wheat was assumed to be a preferred crop for its resilience to wet Irish weather and soil, but evidence of other cereals such as rye, einkorn and barley have been recovered, albeit at a lesser degree. Sugarcane, maize, sorghum, and dryland grasses were introduced to Ireland in only recent centuries, and were therefore absent from the diet of Neolithic Irish. Likewise, although the remains of oat were discovered, their minimal quantity at sites indicate that it was a wild plant, and not yet cultivated. New domestic livestock including beef and sheep are understood to have been brought to the island from continental Europe, in addition to red deer, which marked new and increasingly significant species in the Irish diet. For example, evidence of enclosures couching large assemblages of charred cattle bones suggests the cooking and consumption of large quantities of beef, potentially during large communal gatherings. As they were during the Mesolithic period, hazelnuts were still prevalent discoveries at many Neolithic sites, though their presence declines toward the Bronze Age.

The introduction of agricultural management greatly influenced new dietary staples of the Irish communities. While attention on farming crops witnessed a decline in the consumption of wild forage, changes in the landscape also offered new foraging opportunities for wild plant life which would have thrived along the edges of cleared agricultural land.

While radiocarbon dating of Neolithic fish nets and weirs suggests the consumption of marine life, what archeological evidence of food has been recovered points to a sharp decline in the consumption of aquatic species, converse to the notable consumption of marine life by the Mesolithic Irish. The advancements of farming during the Neolithic period are assumed to have influenced this decline, in tandem with the heightened consumption of farmed animals, cereals, and the very influential introduction of dairying, which coincided similar advancements in other Neolithic societies.

Approaches to agriculture, like those elsewhere across northwestern Europe, were focused on long-term plot management rather than rotational methods, and implemented manure as fertilizer. The emergence of new technologies in cooking, water, and waste management is evidenced by an increasing frequency of crescent-shaped mounds of burnt stones, called fulachtaí fia in Irish, that are understood to be the remnants of burning and/or cooking sites. Yet, despite all such advancements, there was a noticeable absence in the presence of cutlery, cooking, or other eating implements among recovered archeological artifacts.

==== Bronze Age (2000-500 BC) ====
It is understood that both direct and indirect cooking methods were important features of Irish cuisine during the Bronze Age (2000—600BCE). The former used open fires to cook foods supported by ceramic vessels, spits, or surface griddles, while the latter used methods to heat surrounding mediums of earth, air, or water to cook foods within. Radiocarbon dating of crescent-shaped mounds of burnt stones, called fulachtaí fia in Irish, are understood to be the remnants of cooking sites in Ireland that emerged in the early Neolithic Period but came to prominence during the Bronze Age. While the word fulacht in medieval texts refers to the direct cooking of food on a spit, it is thought that its origins reside in such Neolithic sites that may have been chiefly used for indirect cooking methods involving hot stones, suggesting at least that the term and its derivatives refer to the activity of cooking.

Contrary to Mesolithic sites featuring burnt mounds, post-Mesolithic sites are significant for featuring significant remnants of flint, charred mounds of stones in close proximity to the remains of domesticated livestock, in addition to being accompanied by pits understood to have held water. Stones belonging to these mounds, the majority of which are large pieces of sandstone, are understood to have been heated and then submerged into these pits of water or buried underground as heat conductors used to boil, steam or bake food.

While burnt mounds of similar natures have been discovered around Europe, Ireland hosts the greatest number of these sites, which suggests that indirect cooking methods were significant in Irish cuisine during the time. These mounds tend to feature a notable amount of stones, thought to be due to their repeated use over hundreds of years, and for the volume of stones needed to heat water to adequate cooking temperatures. Such technology could likely have facilitated a dual purpose for the use in building steam lodges, which were common in parts of Europe at the time, but fulachtaí fia typically feature significant assemblages of charred faunal remains, which argues they were used predominantly as cooking sites. It has been considered that these sites were impromptu cooking locations used particularly by hunters, but most fulachtaí fia were established in low-lying agricultural lands and similar environments not supportive of optimal hunting conditions. As well, the faunal remains recovered from such sites are typically feature the long, upper limb bones of domesticated livestock, archeologically associated with animal exploitation for meat, and also suggestive of animals being previously processed, or slaughtered, butchered, and eaten on site.

As fulachtaí fia emerged alongside developments in animal husbandry in Upper Palaeolithic Europe, pyrolithic technology emerged in response to the newfound importance of livestock. This is further compounded by the scarcity of game animal remains throughout all sites, and otherwise prevalence of sheep, pig, and cattle bones. This is not to discredit the lesser though still significant presence of red deer bones. Likewise, the absence of marine life at fulachtaí fia, also suggests a greater consumption of domestically farmed animals, and might also imply fish were cooked differently or respective of livestock. Many sites feature indications of stake-hole clusters that may have once supported tripods and spits used for draining the blood from- or cooking recently killed animals.

Archeobotanical evidence from the Bronze Age is hard to recover due in part to Ireland's temperate weather and acidic soils, but fossilized hazelnut shells have survived at sites, as well as evidence of elm bark, which is supposed to have been used as feed for livestock and people alike.

There is thought that hazelnuts were used to produce oil, whereupon the nuts would have been boiled in the heated waters of fulachtaí fia for the purpose of extracting their natural oils which would have accumulated atop the water's surface, then skimmed and used or stored. Boiling is thought to have been a choice cooking method during the Bronze Age; the method provided good retention of calories in foods. Boiling meat, for example, is thought to have been a preferred cooking application for both helping to retain moisture in lean meats, for rendering fatty deposits in coarser cuts, as well as extracting marrow from bones.

The aforementioned long, shallow pits that accompany most fulachtaí fia are typically found lined with insulating materials like stone, timber, and other organic materials, and divided with partitions suspected to have been intended to separate the hot stones from edible materials, or to divide different types of foods. It is thought that the use of clean, fresh water was a preferred medium given the placement of troughs over or near natural springs, and for their close proximity to irrigation channels carved into the earth which could have assisted in draining the pit after it was used. Other pits, such as those dug into sand or removed from water sources, are thought to have been used as subterranean ovens.

The typically large scale of these mounds and their perpetuity in the landscape not only suggests that individual fulachtaí fia were returned to and used often, but that they were fixtures of social gatherings both large and small. This is furthered by the presence of large assemblages of animal bones, as well as the mounds' notable distance from developed settlements, and the substantive size of the troughs—expected to have held large quantities of food. The laborious nature of preparing food, in addition to that of building these hearths would likely have required multiple actors working over long periods of time to finalize a meal, which suggests that cooking food would have been a social activity, likely with roles of responsibility distributed among the workers and hence a social structure.

As ritual sites were often marked by the production and display of commemorative items, the suggestion that these sites were sometimes spaces of notable communal gathering is further substantiated by the discoveries of monuments, stone circles, and other non-funerary artifacts. Likewise, that fulachtaí fia are structures made principally to facilitate the indirect cooking of food—methods significantly slower and longer than direct heating applications—provides further reasoning that these mounds were places for special occasions where people chose to spend long periods of time eating and communing together.

=== Gaelic Ireland ===
==== Customs and equipment ====
Hospitality was compulsory on all free landowners to welcome kings, bishops, or judges into their homes, with a wider superstitious fear held by the Irish of the consequences of turning away anyone. Much evidence for early Irish food exists in the law texts and poetry which were written down from the 7th and 8th century AD onwards.

The arrival of Christianity also brought new influences from the Middle East and Roman culture. Honey bees were not present in the 3rd century, according to Solinus; but the legend of Saint Modomnoc reports that he brought honeybees to Ireland about 540. The Bechbretha "bee judgements", initially recorded in the mid 600s, are unique in treating bee swarms as capable of trespass. This is related to their treatment of other livestock, but no other legal system applies the concept to bees; it seems that the authors of the Bechbretha were trying to fit the new facts about bees into their longstanding legal ideas about livestock in general. The Bechbretha gives Irish words related to honey and beekeeping that are cognate with Indo-European forms across Europe and beyond, possibly derived from early Welsh at the time of Modomnoc. The Old Irish word for beeswax is céir, from the Latin ceris, suggesting that honey bees arrived in Ireland after Christianity.

The main meal was eaten in the afternoon or evening. A daytime meal was termed díthat. A meal at night, and especially a celebratory one, was called a feis and was often accompanied by beer. The main cooking utensil was the cauldron (coire) in which a variety of broths and stews were made.

Meals consisted of a staple of bread, fresh milk, or a fermented variety such as bainne clabhair, yoghurt or cheese accompanied by an anlann or tarsunn (relish, condiment) usually of vegetables, salted meat or honey, but could be any variety of seasonal foods. At the public guesthouses (bruiden) a person of high rank was entitled to 3 tarsunn, a lesser person only one.

A wooden cup with two or four handles called a mether (meadar in Irish) was used as a communal drinking vessel at gatherings.

==== Grains ====
Until the arrival of the potato in the 16th century, grains such as oats, wheat and barley, cooked either as porridge or bread, formed the staple of the Irish diet. The most common form of bread consisted of flatbread made from ground oats. These flatbreads could be wafer-thin, like chapati, or thicker like the oatcakes still popular in Scotland.

Household equipment included a kneading trough lasat, a kneading slab lecc, a griddle lann and a griddle turner lainnéne. While oats were the most commonly used grain, bread made from wheat was regarded as a luxury of the aristocratic class. Bread and milk formed the staple of the Irish diet for millennia. From Latin came tortine meaning a small loaf.

Traditional porridge was cooked from oats, barley or wheat meal mixed with water, buttermilk or new milk and cooked to a smooth consistency. This was accompanied by either heavily salted butter, fresh butter or honey.

A fermented mixture of cracked wheat and heated milk was prepared as some form of frumenty or product similar to Turkish tarhana or Middle Eastern kashk. This could have other ingredients added such as egg yolks making a highly nutritious food that could also be dried and stored over winter.

Another grain preparation known as menedach was made by kneading grains and butter together into a type of paste and was known for its medicinal qualities, especially for monks on strict penitential diets. It may have been an early form of roux or perhaps a type of polenta. It could be spread on bread. It is described in the 12th century Icelandic saga Landnamabok in which Irish slaves prepare the food claiming that it will cure thirst. "The Irish thralls found the expedient of kneading meal and butter and said it would quench the thirst. They called it minapak".

==== Meat ====
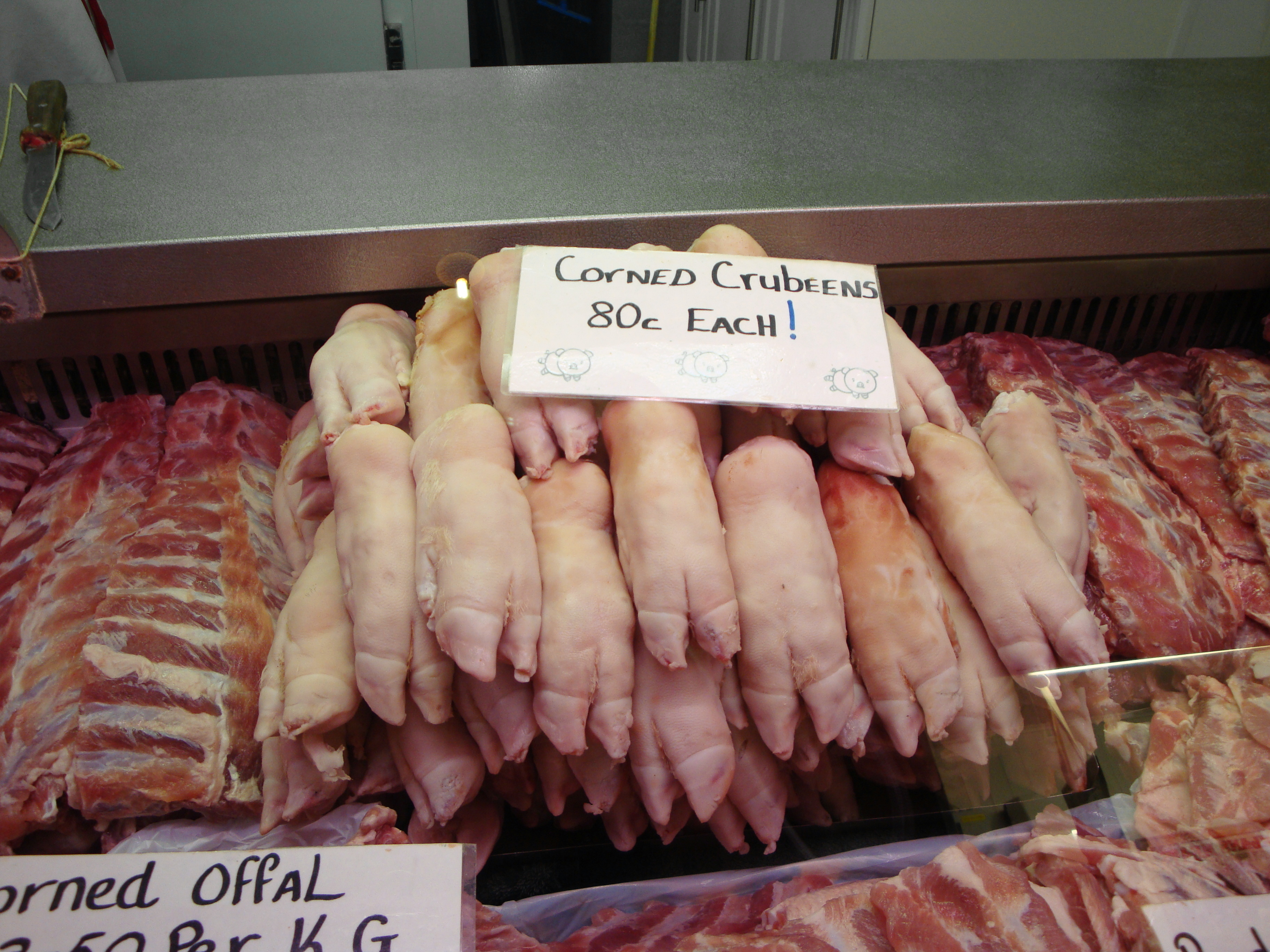
Crubeens are an Irish food made of boiled pigs' feet.

The meat was generally cooked fresh and unspiced, or salted and was boiled in a cauldron. Sometimes it was flavored with honey, sometimes supplied at the table in a dish for dipping. There are many descriptions of meat boiled in a cauldron in a form of stew. One recipe appears to have used "purple berries" to color the meal. There are also descriptions of meat being parboiled and then roasted over a fire on wooden spits somewhat similar to shish kebab.

Consumption of meat was forbidden twice a week on Wednesday and Friday and during Lent. Céadaoin, the name for Wednesday in Irish, means first fast and Aoine the name for Friday, means fast. Orthodox Christian churches still maintain this practice.

Deer were hunted for meat, being trapped in pits, or hunted with dogs.

Both domestic pig and wild boar were eaten. The pork was probably the most common meat consumed in Ireland. Pigs were fattened on acorns in the forests. The flitch of bacon suspended on a hook is frequently mentioned in sources. Sausages made of salted pork are mentioned. Two types of sausage known as maróc (from a Norse loanword) and indrechtán (a sausage or pudding) are mentioned.

The dominant feature of the rural economy was the herding of cattle. Cows were not generally slaughtered for meat unless old or injured, but male cattle, if not destined to be oxen, were often slaughtered at one or two years.

Salted beef was cooked in a cauldron where different forms of stew were commonly made. The meat was also barbecued on spits (bir) made of either wood or iron. The poem Aislinge Meic Con Glinne describes the roasting of pieces of beef, mutton, and ham on spits of whitebeam. The meat was marinated in salt and honey first.

Offal was used in various dishes, with tripe being mentioned the most.

Fish was also sometimes grilled on a spit or griddle over a fire.

In the Irish religious diet, horse and crane meat were forbidden. Fowl in general does not seem to have featured much in the diet. There is also evidence for taboos related to totem animals amongst certain groups or tribes for whom consumption of these animals was forbidden.

==== Dairy ====
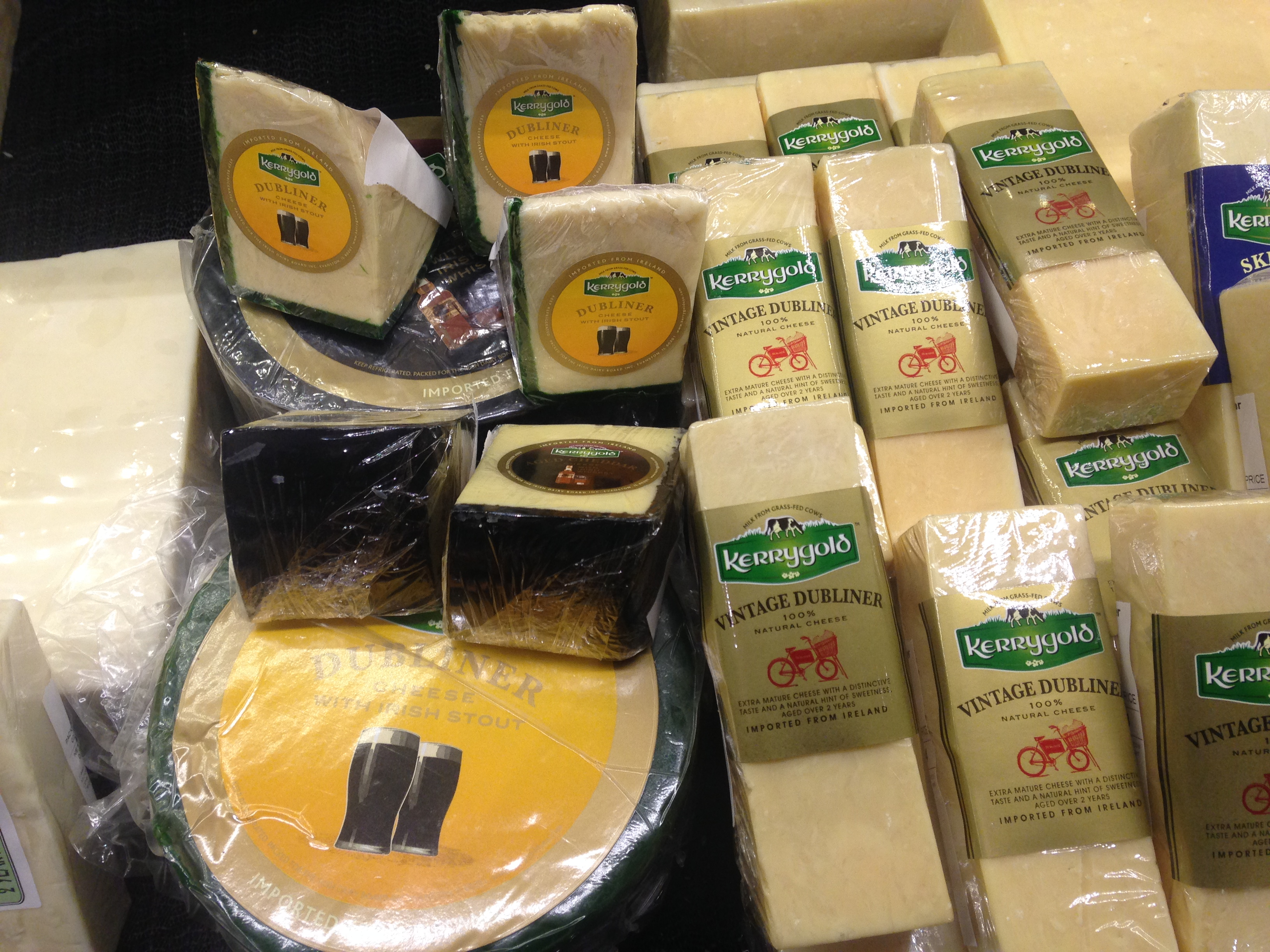
Dubliner cheese USA store

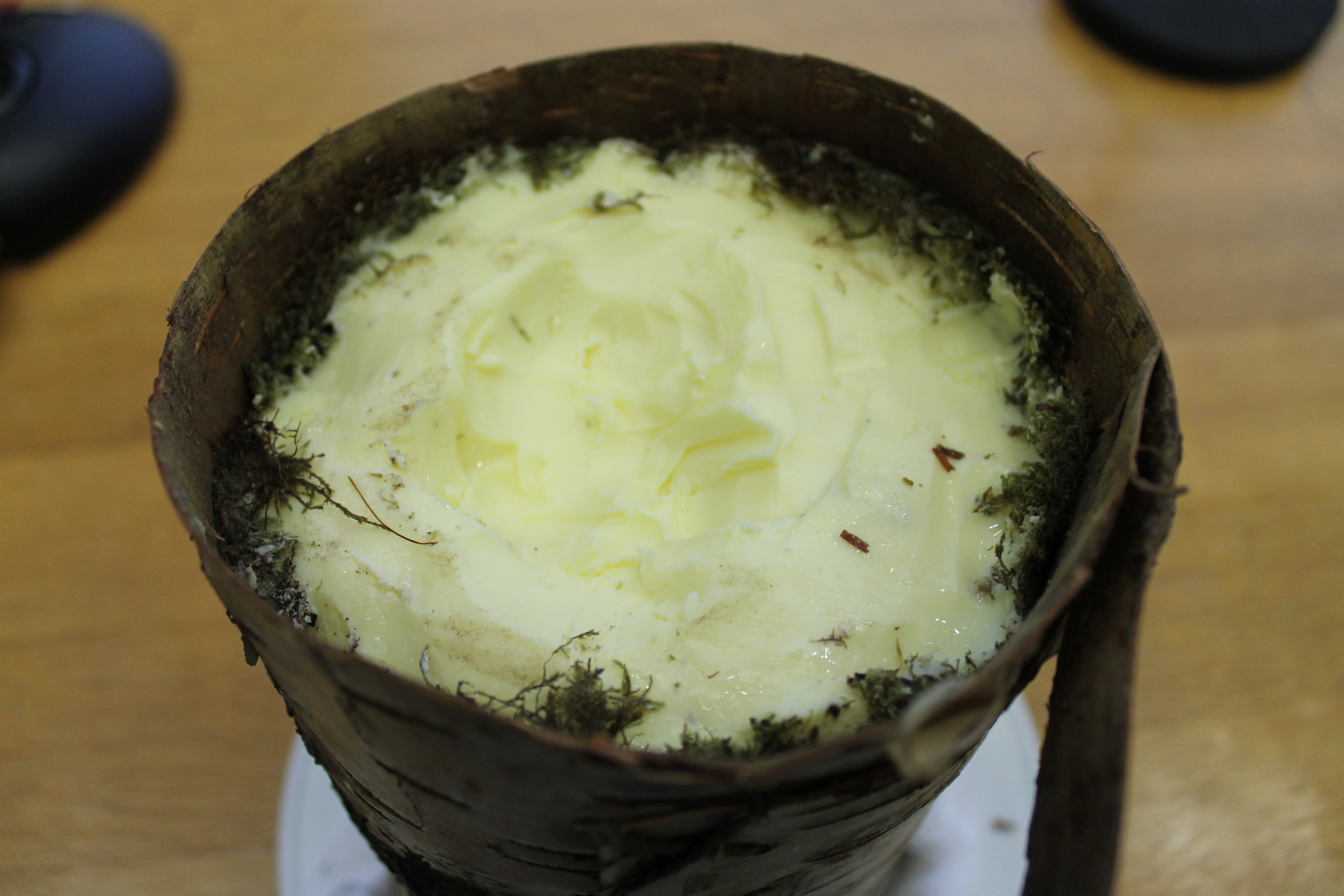
Bog butter made in 2012 for the Oxford Symposium on Food and Cookery

Ireland, with grass growth ten months of the year and no need to shelter cattle in extreme winter conditions, has always produced quality dairy products. Dairy was an important part of the ancient Irish diet, and this is backed up by archaeological record.

Dairy products were known as bánbia (white foods) and milk, butter, curds, and cheese were staples of the diet. Táth was a form of pressed curds, perhaps similar to paneer or cottage cheese. Tánach referred to hard cheese, and mulchán was skimmed milk cheese. Milk or soft sweet-curd was heated with butter to make a sweet drink called milseán or millsén. Milk diluted with water was termed englas.

The practice of bleeding cattle and mixing the blood with milk and butter (similar to the practice of the Maasai people) was not uncommon. Black pudding is made from blood, grain (usually barley), and seasoning, and remains a breakfast staple in Ireland.

Honey seems to have been a precious but abundant commodity, with beekeeping particularly associated with the church and much used in medicine.

Bog butter was stored for safety and allowed to ferment by being buried in bogs which provides a stable temperature in an anaerobic environment facilitating the aging process. The end product may have been something similar to smen, a North African ingredient in many dishes.

==== Fruit and vegetables ====
Vegetables grown and eaten in Ireland included onions, chives, cabbage, celery, wild garlic and leeks. Fat-hen (Chenopodium album) is often found on pre Norman archaeological sites and appears to have been an important part of the diet, as it still is in Northern India. Skirret (Sium sisaram), in Irish cearrachán, appears to have been grown as a root vegetable, but this is no longer used. Watercress, sorrel, parsley, and nettles were picked wild and eaten raw or added to broth.

Apples, pears, cherries, and plums seem to have been the most commonly eaten fruits.

Pulses such as peas, broad beans, and lentils were grown and dried since early medieval times, becoming common with the Normans. Berries and nuts were extensively eaten. Hazelnuts were of great importance. Bilberries, known as fraochán in Irish, were traditionally picked on the festival of Lúghnasa in August. Blackberries and other wild fruit were also picked and consumed.

Pepper has been known in Ireland since early Christian times, being an import from the Roman empire.

The fruit of the strawberry tree (Arbutus unedo), known as caithne in Irish, is associated with religious establishments and may have been used to make or flavour medicine.

==== Drinks ====
Fermented milk is an Irish drink.

Beer was a prerequisite of a noble's house and was usually brewed from barley, although a wheat beer was also made. Malting kilns are a common find in archaeological digs in Ireland and appear from early Christian times on.

Uisce beatha (water of life) or whiskey is an invention of the Gaelic world and was developed after the introduction of distilling in the 12th century.

==== Religious diets ====
Vegetarian diets were known among the strict monastic orders, but it was not compulsory. However, those that did eat meat were only permitted to eat wild pig or deer. Monks lived on a staple gruel made with water or milk and meal known as brothchán. This, on Sundays and festivals had seasonal fruits and nuts and honey added, and it has been suggested that brothchán may have been an early form of muesli.

==== The Pale ====
The Pale was the small area around Dublin in which English influence was strongest, where a hybrid food culture developed consisting of Norse, English and Irish influences.

Excavations at the Viking settlement in the Wood Quay area of Dublin have produced a significant amount of information on the diet of the inhabitants of the town. The main meats eaten were beef, mutton, and pork. Domestic poultry and geese as well as fish and shellfish were also common, as was a wide range of native berries and nuts, especially hazelnuts. The seeds of knotgrass and goosefoot were widely present and may have been used to make a porridge.

Ovens for baking were used in the towns. Evidence for cherries has been found in 11th-century Dublin. Bread was sometimes flavoured with aniseed.

==== The Normans ====
The Norman invasion brought new additions to the diet, introducing rabbits, fallow deer and pheasants in the 12th century. They may also have introduced some freshwater fish, notably pike.

The Norman invasion marked the beginning of both the English and French presence in the country which continued as a unique Hiberno-Norman culture developed in the Norman settled areas and towns. The Norman cuisine characteristically consisted of spicy meat and fowl along with potages and broths, roasts and sauces. The Normans may also have introduced the making of cider. Oysters and scallops were another favourite of the Normans.

==== Medieval Ireland (5th-15th century AD) ====
Distinct from preceding eras, the Middle Ages ushered the development of dense urban centers that dramatically affected preexisting food systems by changing both physical and societal infrastructures. The spread and increasing normalization of a new type of civilian who did not produce or hunt their own food and was thus reliant on foreign market trade and import from rural farms made the need for accessible and consistent sources of food vital.

Uniquely to Ireland, the emergence of Norse towns in the 9th and 10th centuries and their subsequent growth during the arrival of the Anglo-Normans in the 12th and 13th centuries ushered a population boom that brought with it new foods born of foreign trade and new methods of production. The Anglo-Normans in particular propagated a commercial economy that encouraged urban settlement and the steady trade of local and foreign commodities by holding festive market fairs and attracting settlers with offers of burgage plots replete with space for a house and garden.

Documentary data such as medieval law tracts, literature on the lives of saints, as well as early records of land holdings provide insight into how food was grown and distributed among society. As such documents were generally concentrated on the literate upper classes of Ireland, additional archeological data offers broader insight into food consumption habits of peasants, commoners, and Irish Medieval society as a whole. Together, these findings and records play a significant role in interpreting urban food consumption behaviors of Medieval Ireland.

During the Middle Ages in Ireland, laws were written to allow only certain foods to certain classes of people. As the accommodation of guests and its embedded acts of hospitality including the offering of food was a strong social convention of Ireland during this time, people entertained at the homes of others expected the service of specific foods. Consequently, if a guest was 'entitled' to a certain food and did not receive it during their accommodation, they could justly accuse their host of failing to meet their obligations of hospitality which was a punishable offense.

The law tracts articulating the designation of certain foods to certain classes generally focused on free male landowners with some minor attention to free married women, but they do not describe what foods were entitled to peasants. This is because peasants were considered only semi-free (accommodated and thus 'owned' by their landlords) and were therefore not entitled to hospitable offers of food or beverage. There is some description of a 'poor diet' which references what was permitted to criminals and monks.

The specificity of these foods was precise and provided such laws that decided, for example, to whom individual sections of beef were entitled, or in what quantities food was expected to be given and to what kind of person. These 7th- and 8th-century law texts describe 7 grades of commoners and 3 grades of semi-free peasants—with these grades often further subdivided—in order to help guide judges through cases based on customary law. As it was often difficult to distinguish one's class based on looks alone, food was used as a social cue so people could distinguish another's social position, and therefore accommodate them with the appropriate reception.

Prescribing class status to certain foods consequently constructed the perspective of certain foods as being luxurious, and others as being common, but also created distinct nutritional staples for different levels of this stratified society. For example, the lowest-class free commoner was liberally entitled to barley, oats, and dairy products, whereas then penultimate low-class commoner was allowed this in addition to baked breads, though neither were permitted to goods derived of rye or wheat as such cereals were rare in Ireland (and thus privileged only to upper classes of people). Venison and other game meats were likewise considered low-class foods as wild animals derived from ungoverned lands were considered accessible to all classes and thus common. This was contrary to cattle which belonged to the lands of respective lords and made beef a privatized, restricted, and thus more coveted food. The same was said for wild fish, as any commoner was entitled to a fish net or trap, albeit modestly-sized ones.

Based on dietetic rationale, certain foods could travel between ranks under special conditions, such as during injury, pregnancy, menstruation, and illness, when individuals were understood to require more substantial nutrition. All free people during sickness were, for example, permitted garden herbs and small amounts of butter. Free married women were generally entitled to half of what their husbands were entitled to, but it was considered a punishable offense to deny a pregnant woman of any food she craved. This was thought to have been designed in part to protect women from miscarriage. Further dietetic rationale within these laws deemed only soft foods permissible to feed children, including soft eggs, porridge, curds and whey, and garnished only with ingredients (such as honey or butter) that their father's class was permitted to eat.

As religious doctrine heavily influenced these law tracts, Sundays were observed with greater leniency and some foods typically reserved for higher classes were shared with those of lower status. Cow, goat, and sheep milks were staple foods in all classes, from the lowest free commoner to the highest-ranking nobleman, though cow and goat milk were considered higher-ranking milks than sheep's. Common and small birds were afforded to be eaten by commoners, whereas larger or rarer birds such as swans were reserved for royalty (queens, particularly, in the case of swans). Larger eggs of larger birds species were also permitted only to high class individuals for the basic reason that things of greater quantity or volume were given first to people of higher class status.

As written records generally focused on storehouse inventories and staple commodities, archeobotanical remnants recovered from urban cesspits offer further insight into less-common foods such as wild forage, foreign imports, and garden-grown goods that supplemented the diets of upper-class people, and substantiated those of whom could not afford food from the market.

Both written record and archeological data indicate that sheep, cow, and goat milks made for the staple source of protein for most people, while oat, barley, and rye cereals comprised the typical source of carbohydrate, consumed usually as ale, in pot-based dishes, and breads.

As beer-making would only surface later in Ireland during the 14th century, and because ale had a short shelf-life that did not import or export well, ale-brewing was a significant industry in urban centers for providing what was then valued as a nutritious dietary staple. Cheap and widely available, oat was the preferred grain for this industry up until the 14th century until it was replaced by barley which was considered superior, though not as good as wheat.

Wheat was difficult to grow in Ireland's wet, acidic soils, but the Anglo-Normans nonetheless worked to intensify its production as it was a coveted grain to the upper-classes, and vital in the creation of the Catholic sacramental Host; a thin, white wafer. This monastic bread was typically made from barley, oat, and pulse flours baked on ashes or dried into biscuits, but the making of a special wheat-based wafer was reserved for Sundays. As a sacred and rare food, wheat production was a heavily monitored and controlled operation, and wheat products were sometimes used as currency.

Contrarily, while highly-accessible oats were considered 'poor' food, they were also valued as nutritious and easily-digestible, and thus made a staple for children, as well as cheap fuel for horses. Oat gruel, however, was considered inferior in quality and was thus unacceptable to share with travelers. Likewise, pulses, legumes and flours made from them were generally reserved for animal feed and for times of food scarcity. Beans, typically a food of the poorer classes, were often eaten in sweet puddings, according to recipe books of the 13th and 14th centuries. Pulses and legumes also did not grow well in wet, acidic soil, and were generally avoided as a crop, but the arrival of the Anglo-Normans, their new method of crop-rotation, and the coinciding increase of pulse production in Ireland at the time signals the growing of pulses as a means to improve conditions for wheat crops (a crop which thrives in the nitrogen-rich soils left over by a previous crop of pulses or legumes).

Quickly-perishable foods, and those not grown at a commercial scale, such as fruits, nuts, and vegetables are underrepresented in historical records, but archeological evidence suggests such foods were nonetheless important seasonal supplements to the Irish diet. As evidence suggests most urban dwellings were furnished with gardens, the growth and harvest of a variety of fresh fruits, herbs, and vegetables would have provided variety of the diets of urban dwellers.

Fragile plant life erodes and disappears quickly compared to grain chaff that fossilizes easily, what evidence is recovered may present a distorted assessment of what ratio of cereals to plant life was consumed at the time only because there is no empirical data of such eroded materials. The presence of vegetables, in particular, is therefore minimal in archeological assemblages, but fruit—via fossilized seeds and pits—consequently features more frequently, with evidence of cherry, strawberry, sloe, rowan, blackberry, bilberry, apple, and haws as present in Medieval cesspits. Apples are frequently mentioned in Medieval texts of various kinds, particularly in reference to sweet varieties as valuable and rare offerings to nobles and lords, and sour breeds as used to make cider, verjus, vinegar, and medicine. That theological and dietetic discourse affected these texts also affected the corresponding behaviors by which certain foods were consumed—to eat apples raw, for example, was frowned upon by medieval physicians and so apples were generally cooked into puddings, or fermented into drinks.

Fruit and herb consumption in the medieval period was particularly encapsulated in a medicinal fervour as unique fruits were prescribed and avoided for reasons concerning health.

The perishable nature of fruits and vegetables also changed the ways in which they were consumed by challenging consumers to develop methods of preserving them. Cooking and fermenting are already examples, but fruits were also commonly dried, pickled, or made into relishes using brine and honey. Their omnipresence consequently precipitated the convention of eating many sweet and savory foods with jams, jellies, chutneys, and relishes.

An herbal broth called brothchán, made with oatmeal and herbs served to sick was one such dish accompanied by a fruit relish, notably on Sundays. The recovery of several fruit presses also suggests that fruits were pressed into juices, though only at a domestic scale.

Hazelnuts, having been an important Irish food from prehistory, were still common in the medieval era, and ground into a meal called maothal.

There is also documentation of a wine trade between Ireland and Biscay from the 7th century, as well as early Irish texts that reference a wine imported from Bordeaux specifically for church feasts, bolstering substantial evidence of wine trade between Ireland, France and England between the 12th and 15th centuries.

=== Post-Medieval Ireland ===
The situation changed for the poor, who made up 75 percent of the population of around nine million by 1840. Potatoes formed the basis of many Irish dishes and were eaten both by the Anglo-Irish gentry and the mass of the people.

This was unusual as the potato was shunned in most of Europe for centuries after its introduction, particularly by the elites.

The potato was first introduced into Ireland in the second half of the 16th century, initially as a garden crop. It eventually came to be the main food crop of the poor. As a food source, the potato is extremely valuable in terms of the amount of energy produced per unit area of crop. The potato is also a good source of many vitamins and minerals, particularly vitamin C when fresh. Potatoes were widely cultivated, but in particular by those at a subsistence level. The diet of this group in this period consisted mainly of potatoes supplemented with buttermilk.

At this time Ireland produced large quantities of salted (corned) beef, almost all of it for export. The beef was packed into barrels to provision the navy, army, and merchant fleet. Corned beef became associated with the Irish in America where it was plentiful and used as a replacement for the bacon in bacon and cabbage. However, it was not traditional fare in Ireland.

Fresh meat was generally considered a luxury except for the most affluent until the late-19th century. A pig was often kept for bacon and was known as the "gentleman that pays the rent". Potatoes were also fed to pigs, to fatten them prior to their slaughter at the approach of the cold winter months. Much of the slaughtered pork would have been cured to provide ham and bacon that could be stored over the winter.

Chickens were not raised on a large scale until the emergence of town grocers in the 1880s allowed people to exchange surplus goods, like eggs, and for the first time purchase a variety of food items to diversify their diet.

The over-reliance on potatoes as a staple crop meant that the people of Ireland were vulnerable to poor potato harvests. The first Great Famine of 1739 was the result of extreme cold weather, but the famine of 1845–1849 (see Great Irish Famine) was caused by potato blight which spread throughout the Irish crop which consisted largely of a single variety, the Lumper. During the famine approximately one million people died and a million more emigrated.

Tea was introduced during Ireland's time as part of the United Kingdom and became increasingly popular, especially during the 19th century. Irish people are now amongst the highest per capita tea drinkers in the world. Tea is drunk hot and with milk at all times of the day. Slightly stronger varieties are preferred than in England.

==== Great Famine ====
In 1845, the Great Famine began when many potato crops in Ireland had been infected with the mold that causes potato blight. This had turned their potatoes diseased and useless, putting many who are already in poverty into deeper poverty. The crop had failed due to potato blight in 1845–46, had little success in 1847, and failed once again in 1848.

The starving people tried eating the potatoes, and became extremely sick from eating them. They began eating a diet of eggs, birds, and plants like nettles and chickweed. Many farmers bled their cattle out and fried the blood rather than eat their meat. With the cattle as malnourished as the people, the meat was not fit for consumption, so they resorted to using the blood mixed with herbs, garlic, oats and butter, to use as a subsistence meal. The extremely desperate and malnourished ate rats and worms found off the street.

==== Post-Famine migration ====
After the famine, many Irish women migrated to America to escape poverty, and were exposed to new ingredients and foods not common in Ireland, such as a greater variety of meats and produce. Entering domestic service in America, they had to adapt their cooking to please the upper-class in America.

This was problematic at first due to Irish women clinging to foods and ingredients common in Ireland. This caused much prejudice towards Irish women and many would mock the Irish's lack of cooking skills without considering the famine and poverty Irish women grew up with.

Newspapers, including the Women's Journal, published articles which contained prejudice towards Irish women for seemingly being unable to know how to cook.

Irish women in domestic service later gained the experience with ingredients abundant in America and altered Irish cuisine to be foods for pleasure. In Ireland food was designed based on caloric intake, instead of for pleasure, such as foods in America. Traditional Irish dishes started to include more meat and fruit and allowed for Irish food to stray from the stigma of being bland.

=== Modern era ===
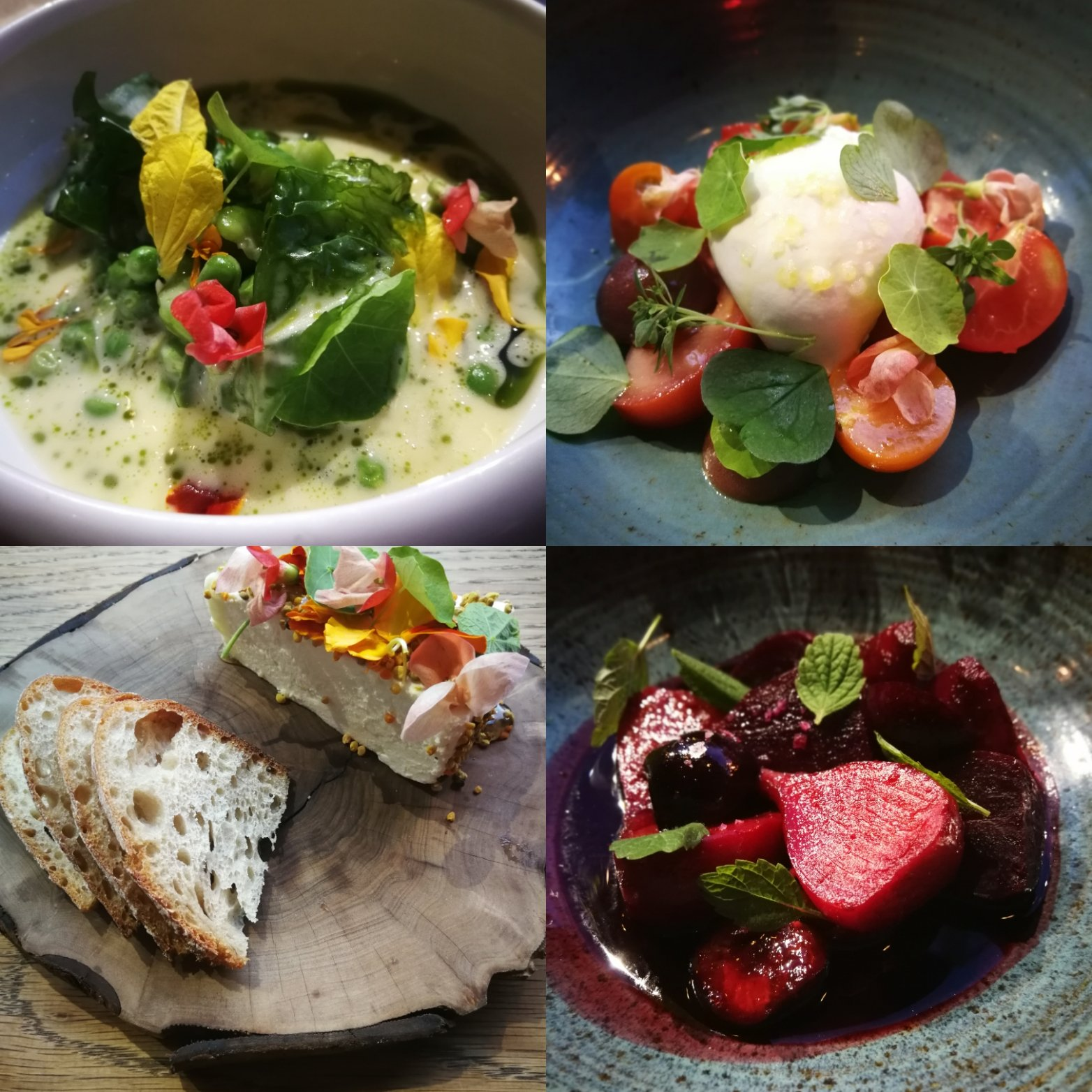
Traditional Irish ingredients can be arranged by chefs to create a beautiful contemporary meal.

In the 21st century, the modern selection of foods familiar in the West has been adopted in Ireland. Common meals include pizza, curry, Chinese food, Thai food, and lately some Central European-Eastern European (especially Polish) dishes have been making an appearance, as ingredients for these and other cuisines have become more widely available.

Since the mid-twentieth century, coleslaw (Irish: cálslá) has become a popular side dish in Ireland, particularly as an accompaniment to lasagne.

In tandem with these developments, the last quarter of the 20th century saw the emergence of a new Irish cuisine based on traditional ingredients handled in new ways. This cuisine is based on fresh vegetables, fish (especially salmon and trout), oysters, mussels and other shellfish, traditional soda bread, the wide range of cheeses that are now being made across the country, and, of course, the potato.

Traditional dishes, such as Irish stew, coddle, the Irish breakfast, and potato bread have enjoyed a resurgence in popularity. Chef and food writer Myrtle Allen—an early protagonist of such attitudes and methods—went on to play a crucial role in their development and promotion. Schools like the Ballymaloe Cookery School have emerged to cater for to associated increased interest in cooking.

Fish and chips take-away is popular. A fish and chip in Ireland is most commonly referred to as a chipper. The first fish and chips were sold in Dublin in the 1880s by an Italian immigrant from San Donato Val di Comino, Giuseppe Cervi. His wife Palma would ask customers "Uno di questa, uno di quella?" This phrase (meaning "one of this, one of the other") entered the vernacular in Dublin as "one and one", which is still a common way of referring to fish and chips in the city.

In much of Ulster (especially Northern Ireland and County Donegal), fish and chips are usually known as a "fish supper". The restaurant from which the food is purchased and the food itself is often referred to as a "chippy" throughout many northern regions of the country.

The proliferation of fast food has led to increasing public health problems, including obesity, and it was reported in 2012 that as many as 327,000 Irish children had become obese or overweight, and in response the Irish government considered introducing a fast-food tax. Government efforts to combat obesity have also included television advertising campaigns and educational programmes in schools.

== Common foods ==
- Dairy: butter, milk, buttermilk, cheese
- Grains: barley, oats, wheat
- Freshwater fish: pollan, trout, salmon, smoked salmon, smoked trout
- Seafood: mackerel, cod, hake, haddock, smoked haddock, mussels, oysters, lobster, crab, sea vegetables (seaweeds), dillisk
- Meat: beef, chicken, duck, lamb, pork, turkey, goose, offal
- Vegetables: curly kale, potatoes, carrots, onions, cabbage, rhubarb
- Fruits: apple, pear, plum, blackberry, strawberry, raspberry, tomatoes
- Herbs: parsley, thyme, rosemary, chives.
- Spices: cinnamon, nutmeg, mixed spice, black pepper.

== Traditional foods ==
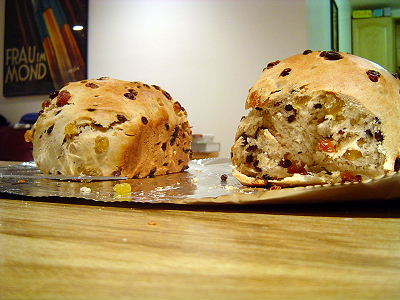
Two loaves of barmbrack

=== Breads ===
- Barmbrack—a kind of currant cake which contains a golden ring. Traditionally eaten around Halloween.
- Blaa—a doughy, white bread bun
- Goody—a dessert
- Oatcake
- Potato bread
- Soda bread—a yeast-free bread
- Soda farl—a traditional food in Ulster, especially in East Donegal, Inishowen and Northern Ireland
- Veda bread (popular in Ulster)
- Wheaten bread

=== Pork dishes ===
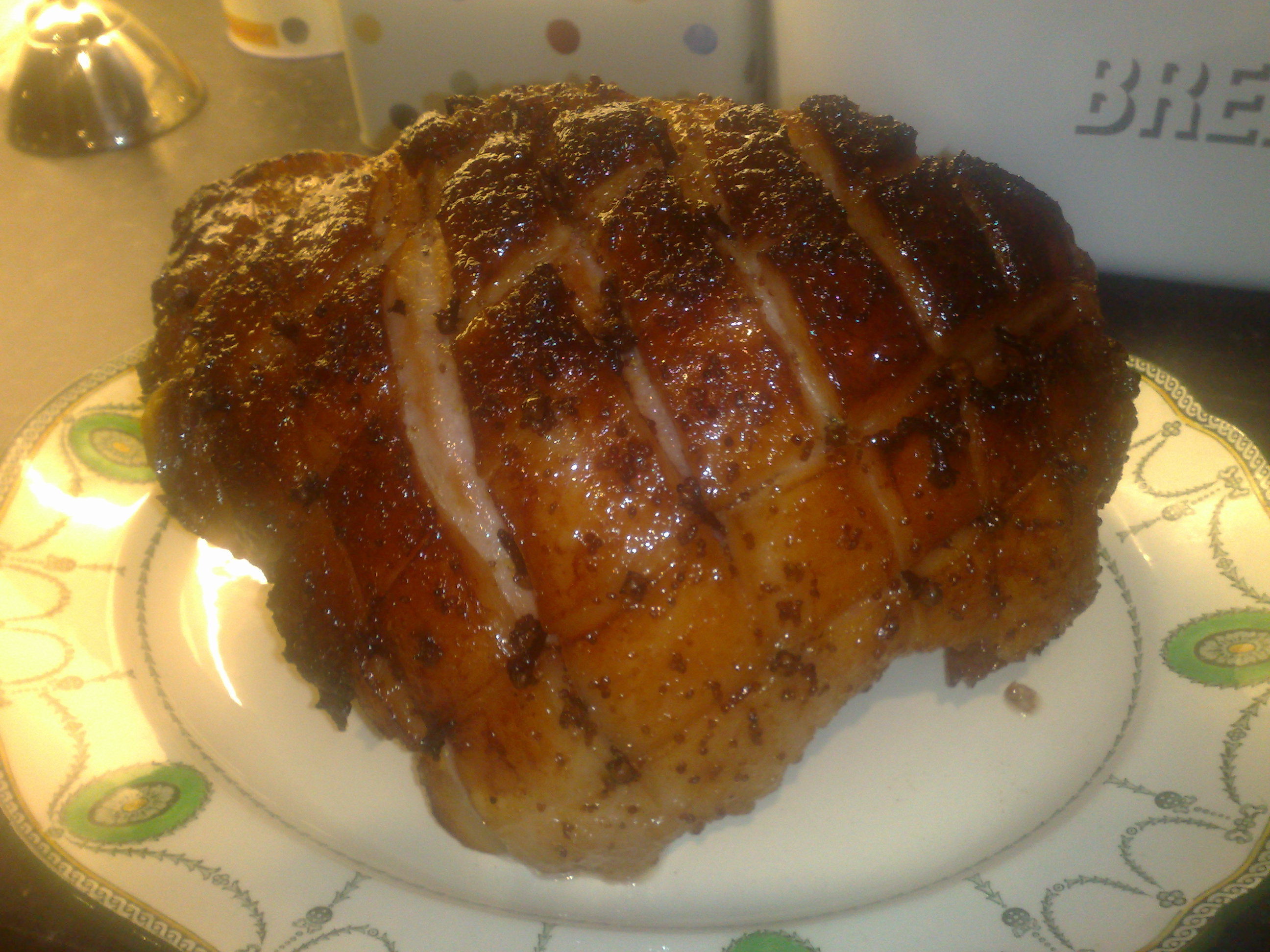
Traditional Irish glazed ham, sometimes eaten at Christmas.

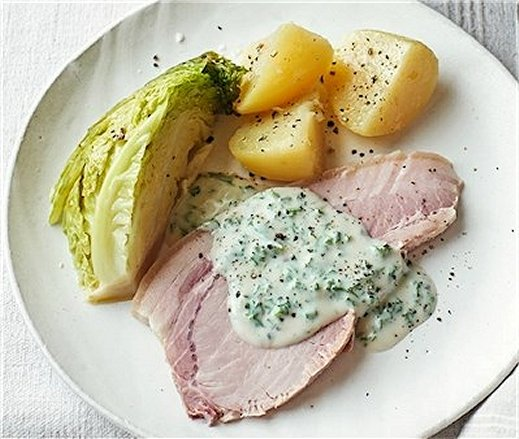
Boiled bacon and cabbage in Ireland is a traditional Irish dish, normally served with mashed potatoes and shredded cabbage.

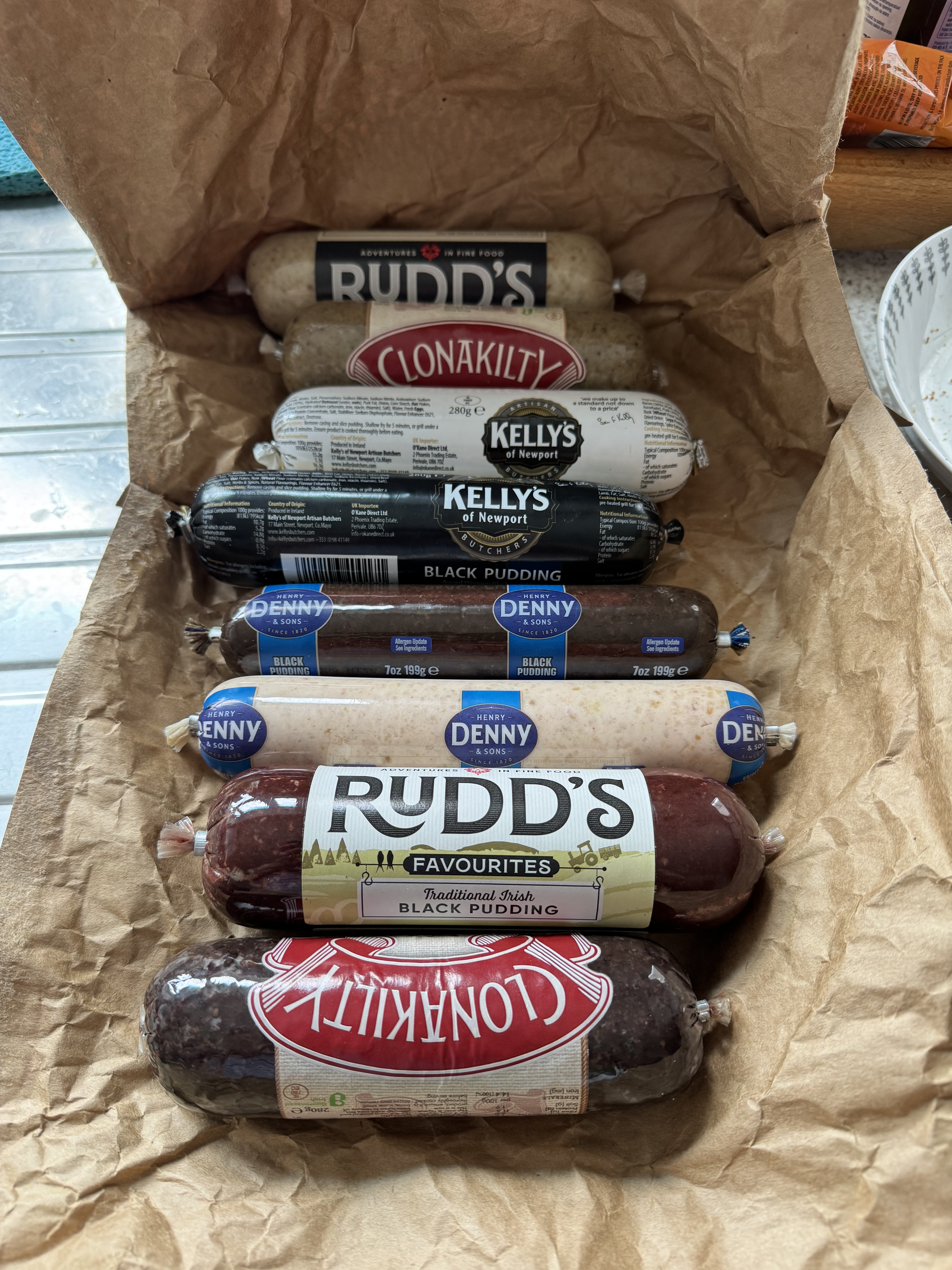
Various commercial black and white puddings which comprise an integral part of a traditional Irish breakfast

- Bacon and cabbage
- Black pudding—a traditional dish made from pig's blood, barley and seasoning
- Coddle—main ingredients: pork sausage, back bacon and potato
- Crubeens—pig's trotters
- Skirts and kidneys—a kind of pork stew
- White pudding—suet, oatmeal or barley, pork meat or liver

=== Potato dishes ===
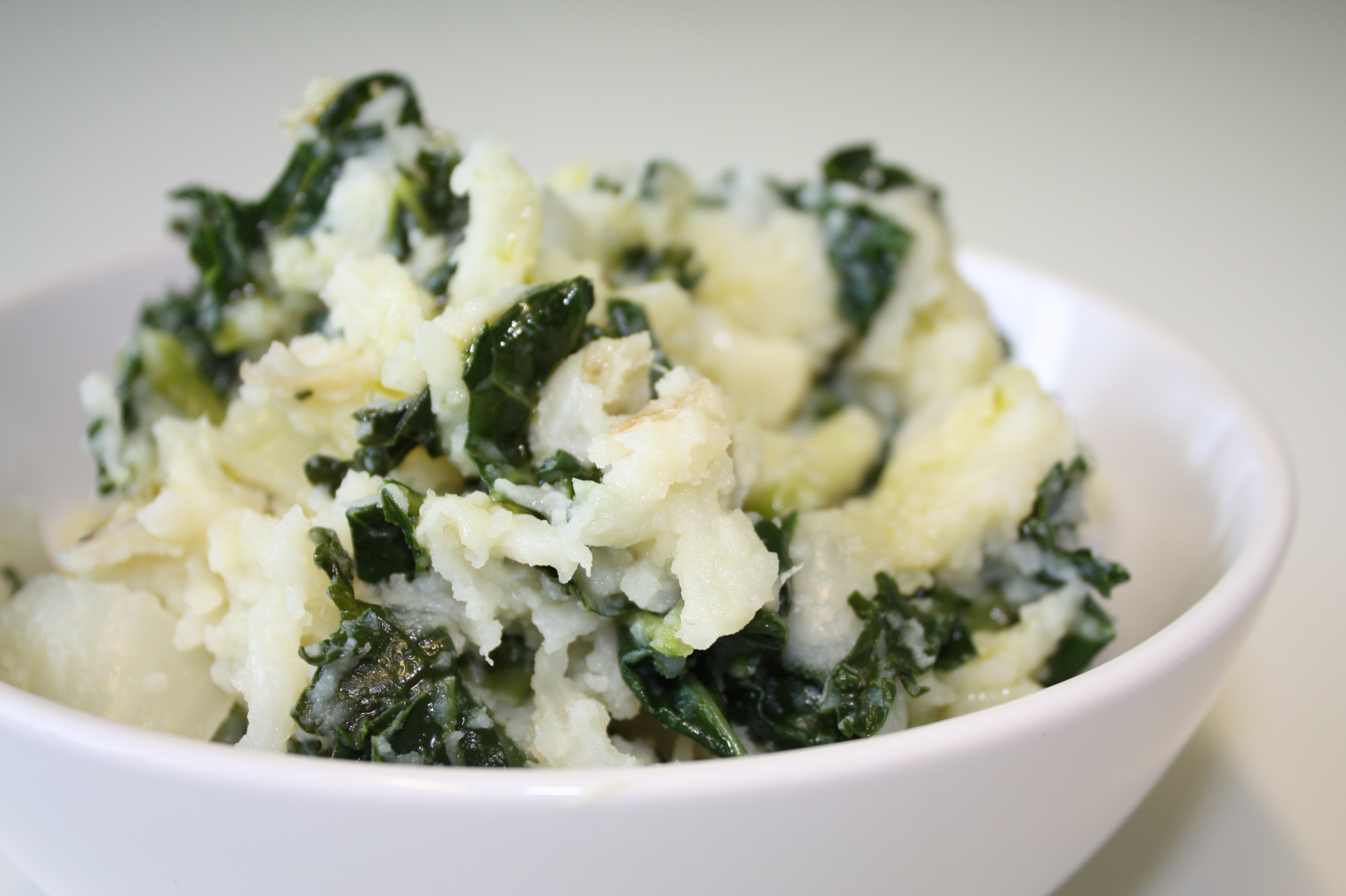
A bowl of colcannon, an Irish potato and kale dish

- Boxty—a potato pancake
- Champ—main ingredients: mashed potato, scallions, butter and milk
- Colcannon—main ingredients: mashed potato, kale or cabbage, and butter

=== Seafood ===
The consumption of seafood, despite Ireland's enormous coastline, is not as common as in other maritime countries. Irish people eat seafood well below the European average. It may have been more common in the past but declined markedly in the last few centuries.

Irish-owned shipping was severely restricted under English governance from the late 16th century on. Ireland was traditionally a cattle-based economy and fish was associated with religious fasting. It was the traditional food of fast on Fridays, in common with other Catholic countries. Also, seafood—particularly shellfish—became associated with the poor and the shame of colonisation. However, seafood has remained an important part of the diet in coastal communities, and the consumption of fresh fish and seafood is now undergoing a resurgence all over Ireland.

In Dublin, the fish seller is celebrated in the traditional folk song Molly Malone, and in Galway the international Galway Oyster Festival is held every September. An example of a modern Irish shellfish dish is Dublin Lawyer (lobster cooked in whiskey and cream). Salmon and cod are perhaps the two most common types of fish eaten. Carrageen moss and dulse (both types of red algae) are commonly used in Irish seafood dishes.

Seaweed, by contrast, has always been an important part of the Irish diet and remains popular today. Two popular forms are dillisk (known in Ulster as dulse; Palmaria palmata) and Irish moss (carageen moss, Chondrus crispus, Mastocarpus stellatus).

=== Others ===
- Breakfast roll
- Chicken fillet roll
- Drisheen—a kind of black pudding
- Irish breakfast
- Irish stew—lamb and mutton stew
- Porridge
- Spice bag
- Jambon

== Traditional beverages ==
=== Alcoholic ===
- Whiskey (particularly pure pot still whiskey) such as Jameson Irish Whiskey, Paddy Whiskey, and Bushmills
- Porter or stout such as Guinness, Murphy's Irish Stout, and Beamish stout
- Irish red ale such as Smithwick's
- Lager
- Irish coffee, made with strong black coffee, whiskey, sugar, and whipped cream
- Irish cream such as Baileys
- Irish Mist
- Mead
- Poitín, a very strong (often homemade) spirit made from potatoes or barley
- Cider, such as Magners / Bulmers

=== Non-alcoholic ===
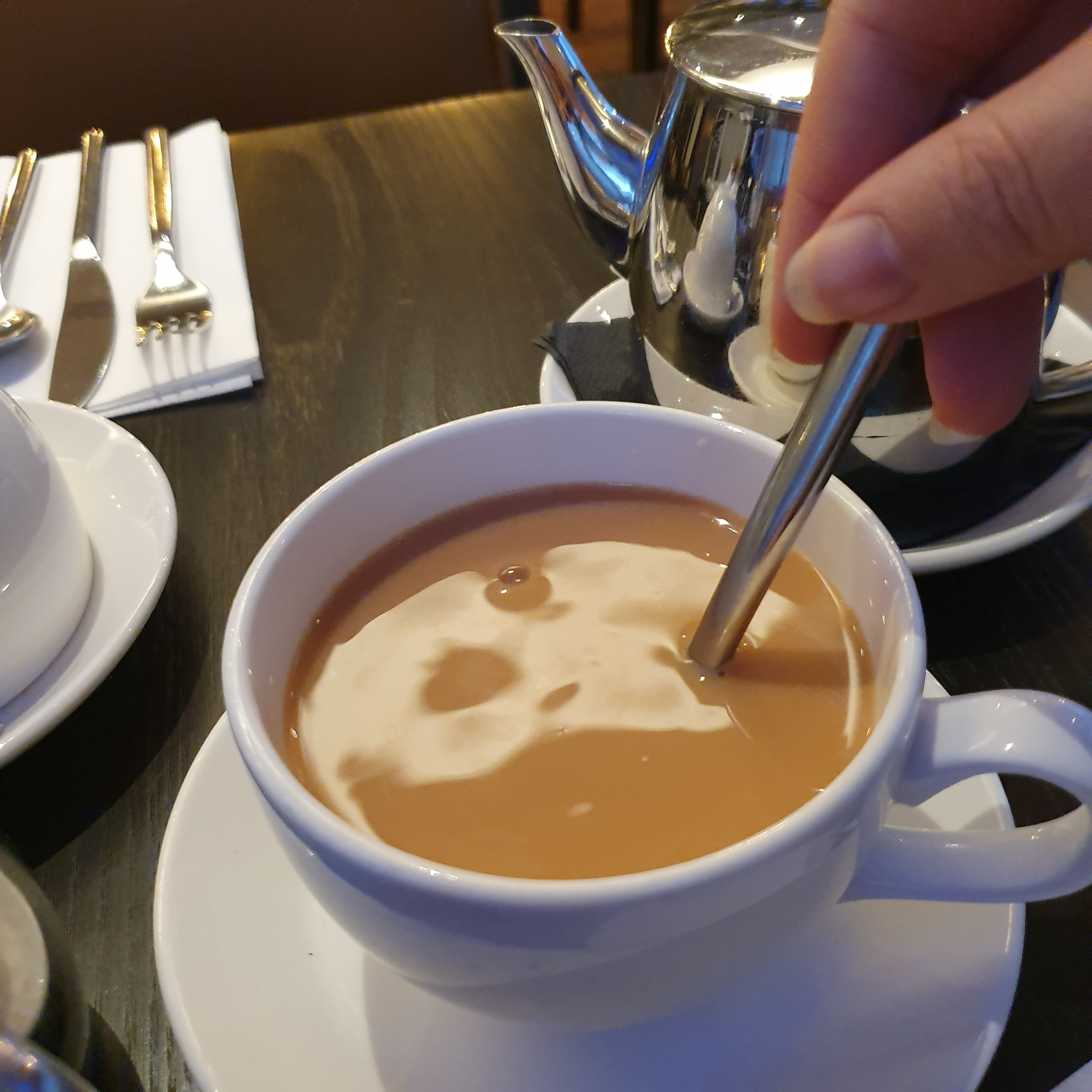
Irish breakfast tea

- Brown lemonade (usually only found in Ulster)
- Red lemonade
- Cavan Cola
- McDaid's Football Special (usually only found in the west of Ulster)
- Irish breakfast tea
- Cidona
- Tanora
- Club

== Irish chefs ==
- Myrtle Allen
- Darina Allen
- Rachel Allen
- Anna Haugh
- Neven Maguire
- Catherine Fulvio
- Clodagh McKenna
- Derry Clarke
- Richard Corrigan
- Denis Cotter
- Trish Deseine
- Kevin Dundon
- Dylan McGrath
- Dan Mullane
- Paul Rankin
- Kevin Thornton
- Dónal Skehan
- David and Stephen Flynn

== See also ==
- List of Irish dishes
- European cuisine
- Galway International Oyster Festival
- Northern Irish cuisine
- St. Patrick's Day
