= Limerick ham =

Irish ham preparation method

Limerick ham (Irish: Liamhás Luimnigh) is a particular method of preparing a joint of ham within the cuisine of Ireland. The dry curing method was originally developed in County Limerick, Ireland.

== History ==
From the 19th century, Limerick manufacturers such as O'Mara's, Matterson, Shaws, and Denny made Limerick renowned for its ham and pork products. Limerick was so synonymous with its production of pork products, it became known as "Pigtown". O'Mara's opened in 1839, and had an factory in Russia in the 1890s, as well as offices in London and Romania.

They were exported across the British Empire on "Limerick Liners" from the early 1800s. Some sources claim that Queen Victoria ate Limerick ham for Christmas. It was among the provisions on the Titanic, and has been served to visiting dignitaries to Ireland including Ronald Regan.

The pork trade in Limerick went into decline from the 1970s, unable to compete with imported products from Denmark, France, and the Netherlands.

== Preparation ==
Traditionally, the initial stage in the preparation of a Limerick ham is to smoke it over juniper branches. After this stage, the whole haunches, hams, and other cuts are distributed to butchers, who usually divide these large cuts into smaller portions and may cure the meat prior to sale. Theodora FitzGibbon noted a recipe from 1779 states that a ham would be smoked for 2 or 3 days in a chimney over a fire of oak shavings, straw and "one pound of juniper berries".

In the manufacturing process the meat is first dry cured in a "salt-and-stack" method by rubbing it with dry salt, saltpetre and sugar, and then hung and smoked for at least 10-12 hours over smouldering straw and sawdust.

After purchase, a Limerick ham is typically steeped in cold water overnight. Cooking involves boiling in cider, then baking on a very high heat to crisp the fat.

== See also ==
- List of hams
- List of Irish dishes
