= Goody (food) =

Irish bread pudding

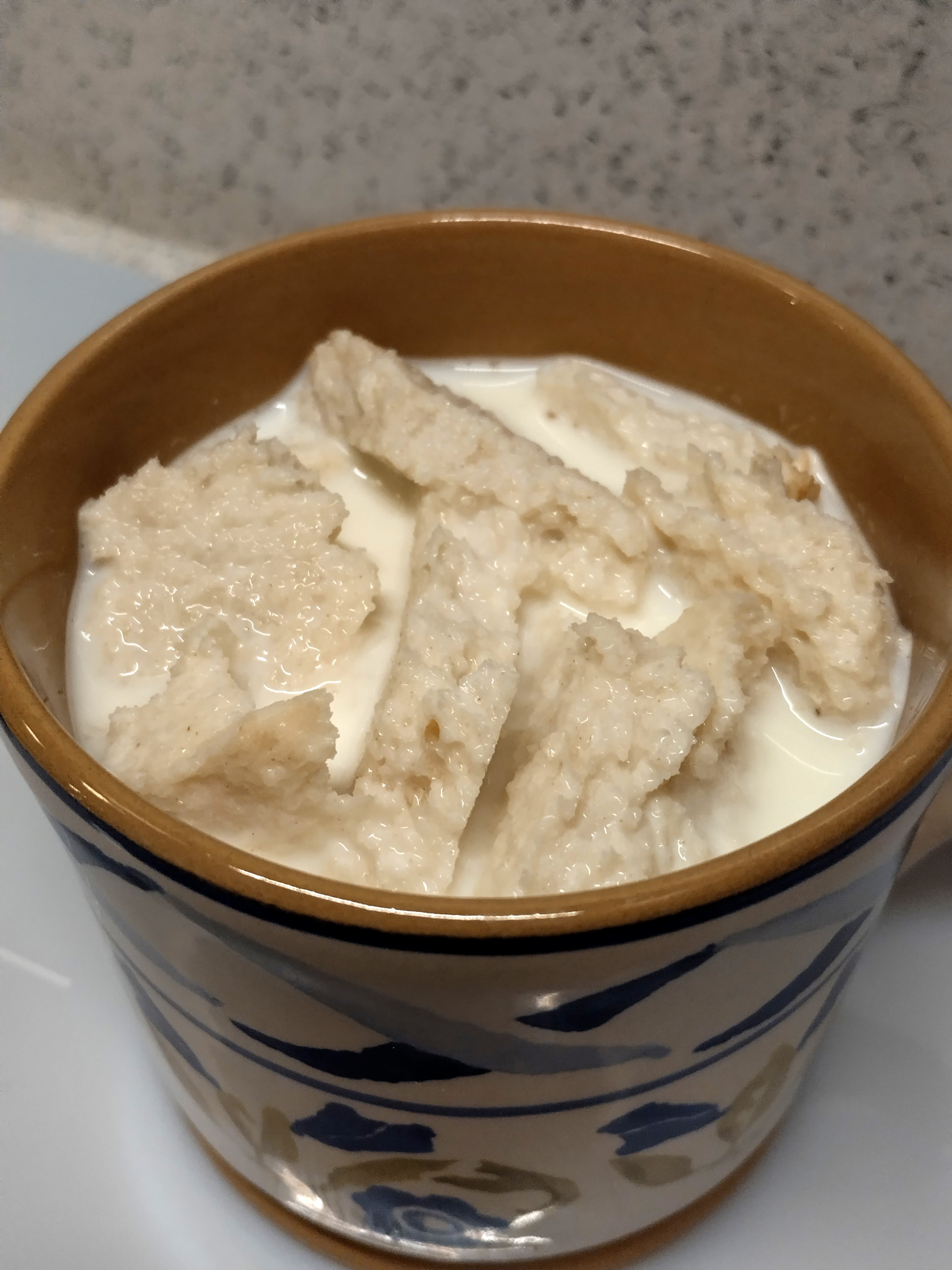
- Alternative names: Goodie
- Type: Pudding
- Place of origin: Ireland
- Main ingredients: Bread, milk, sugar, spices

Goody or goodie is a sweet Irish dish made by boiling bread in milk with sugar and spices. It is often given to children or older adults who are convalescing. This dish is eaten on St. John's Eve, when it would be prepared near the bonfires lit to celebrate. A variation was prepared using milky tea to soak the bread. The dish is also prepared by parents to give to children when they have an upset stomach.

Many children were given this during the 20th century as a treat in neighbours' houses or after school as a snack before dinner. A modern variant adds cocoa powder and chocolate drops.

== See also ==
- List of Irish dishes
- Popara
