= Coddle =

Irish stew with no fixed recipe, built around boiled sausages

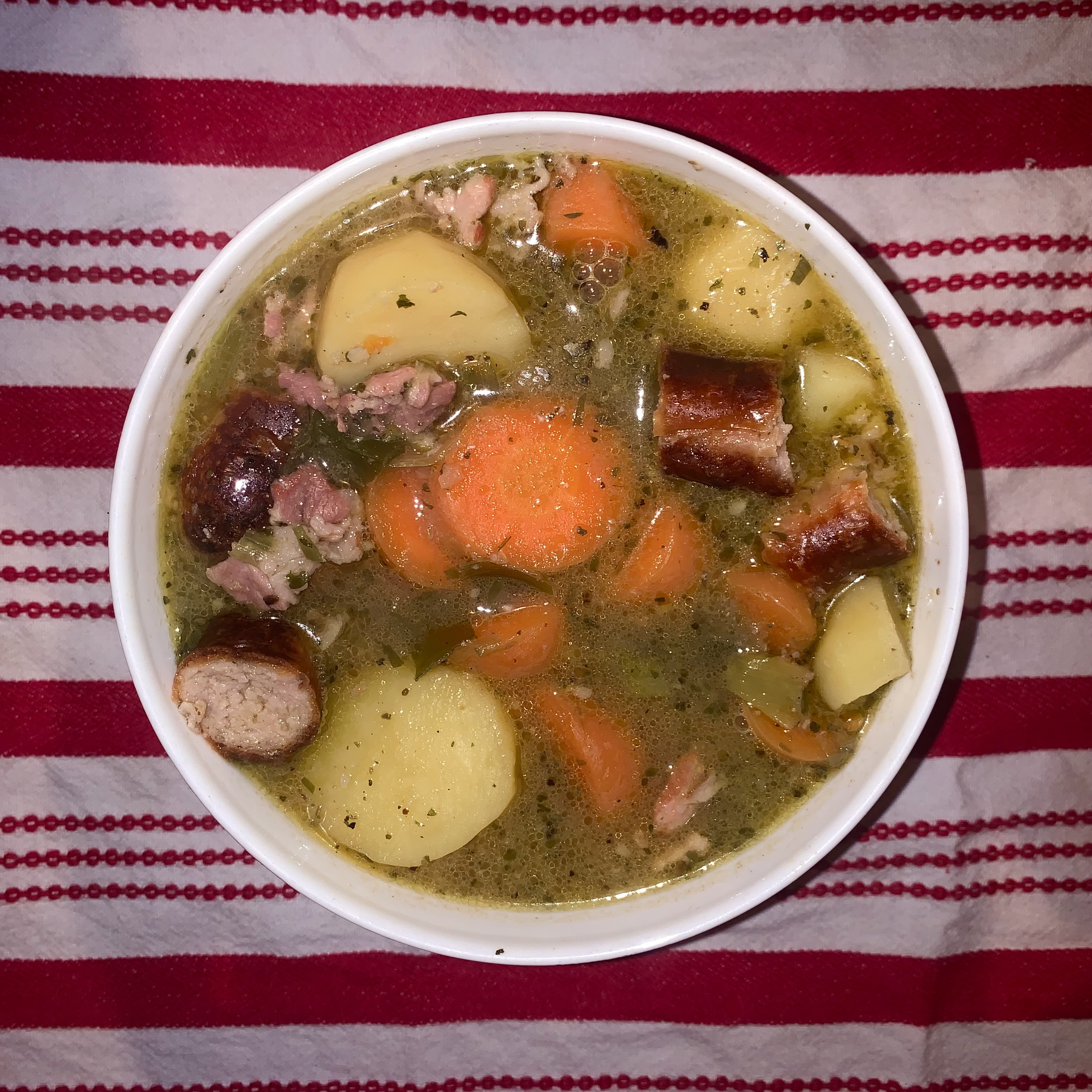
- Coddle
- Alternative names: Dublin coddle
- Type: Stew, soup
- Course: Main course
- Place of origin: Ireland
- Region or state: Dublin
- Main ingredients: Potatoes, pork sausage, rashers, onion

Coddle (sometimes Dublin coddle; Irish: cadal) is an Irish dish which is often made to use up leftovers. It most commonly consists of layers of roughly sliced pork sausages and rashers (thinly sliced, somewhat-fatty back bacon) with chunky potatoes, sliced onion, salt, pepper, and herbs. Traditionally, it can also include barley.

Coddle is particularly associated with Dublin, the capital of Ireland. It was reputedly a favourite dish of the writers Seán O'Casey and Jonathan Swift, and it appears in several references to Dublin, including the works of James Joyce.

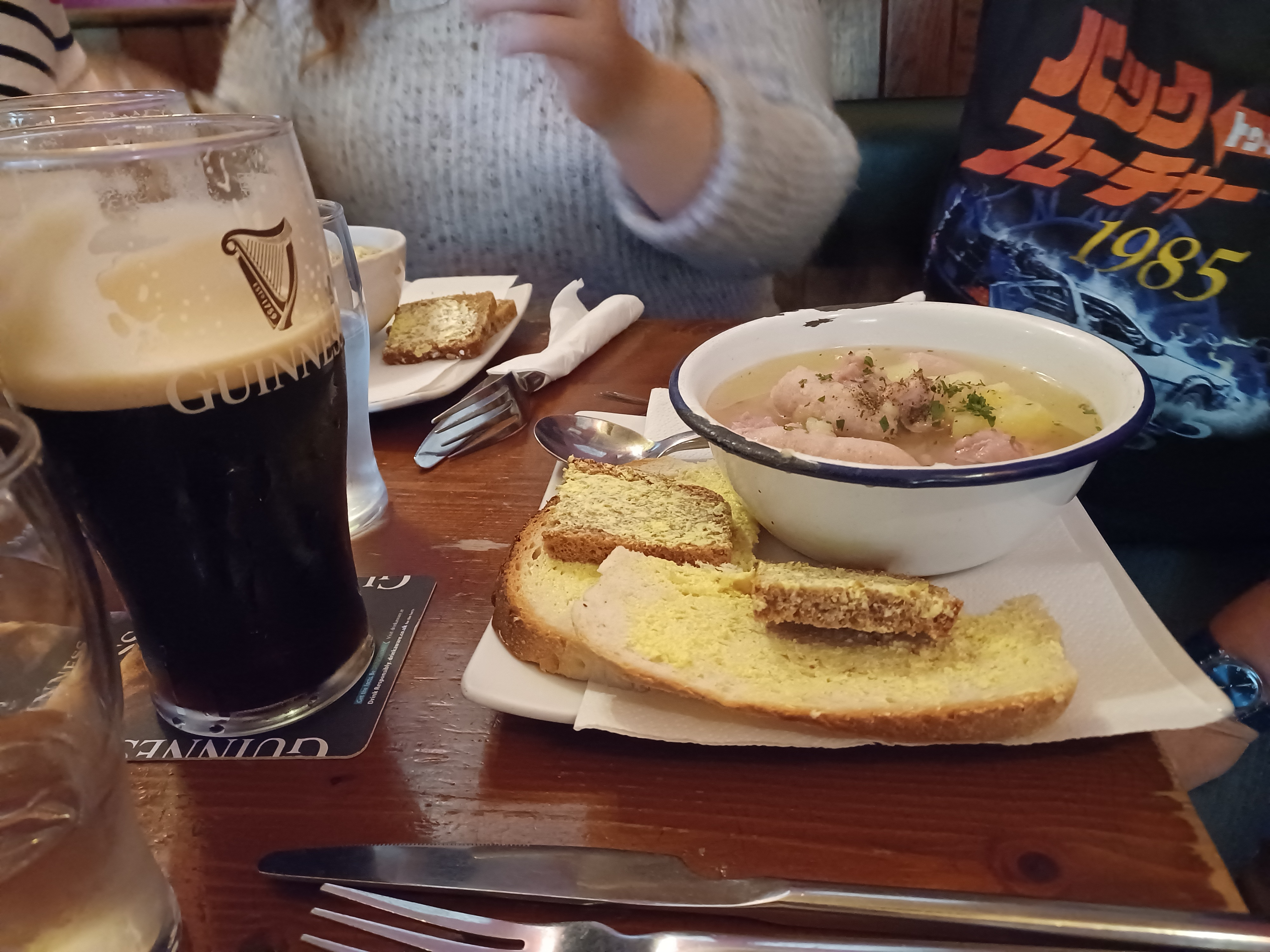
Coddle in Dublin, 2022

The dish is braised in the stock produced by boiling the pieces of bacon and sausages. The dish is cooked in a pot with a well-fitting lid in order to steam the ingredients left uncovered by the broth. Sometimes raw sliced or diced potato is added, but traditionally is eaten with bread. The only seasonings are usually salt, pepper, and occasionally parsley.

== Etymology ==
The name comes from the verb coddle, meaning to cook food in water below boiling (see coddled egg), which in turn derives from caudle, which comes from the French term meaning ‘to boil gently, parboil or stew’.

== Significance in Irish popular culture ==
Because coddle is seen as particular to Dublin, and because of its unappetising appearance to those who have not seen it before, many Dubliners are defensive of the dish. As with other controversial national dishes such as casu martzu, escargot or hákarl, enthusiasts take the revulsion of the uninitiated as a point of pride—in particular, many coddle enthusiasts see browning the sausages as an unacceptable cop-out.

== See also ==
- Colcannon
- List of Irish dishes
- List of potato dishes
- List of sausage dishes
- List of meat and potato dishes
