= Drisheen =

Type of Irish blood sausage pudding

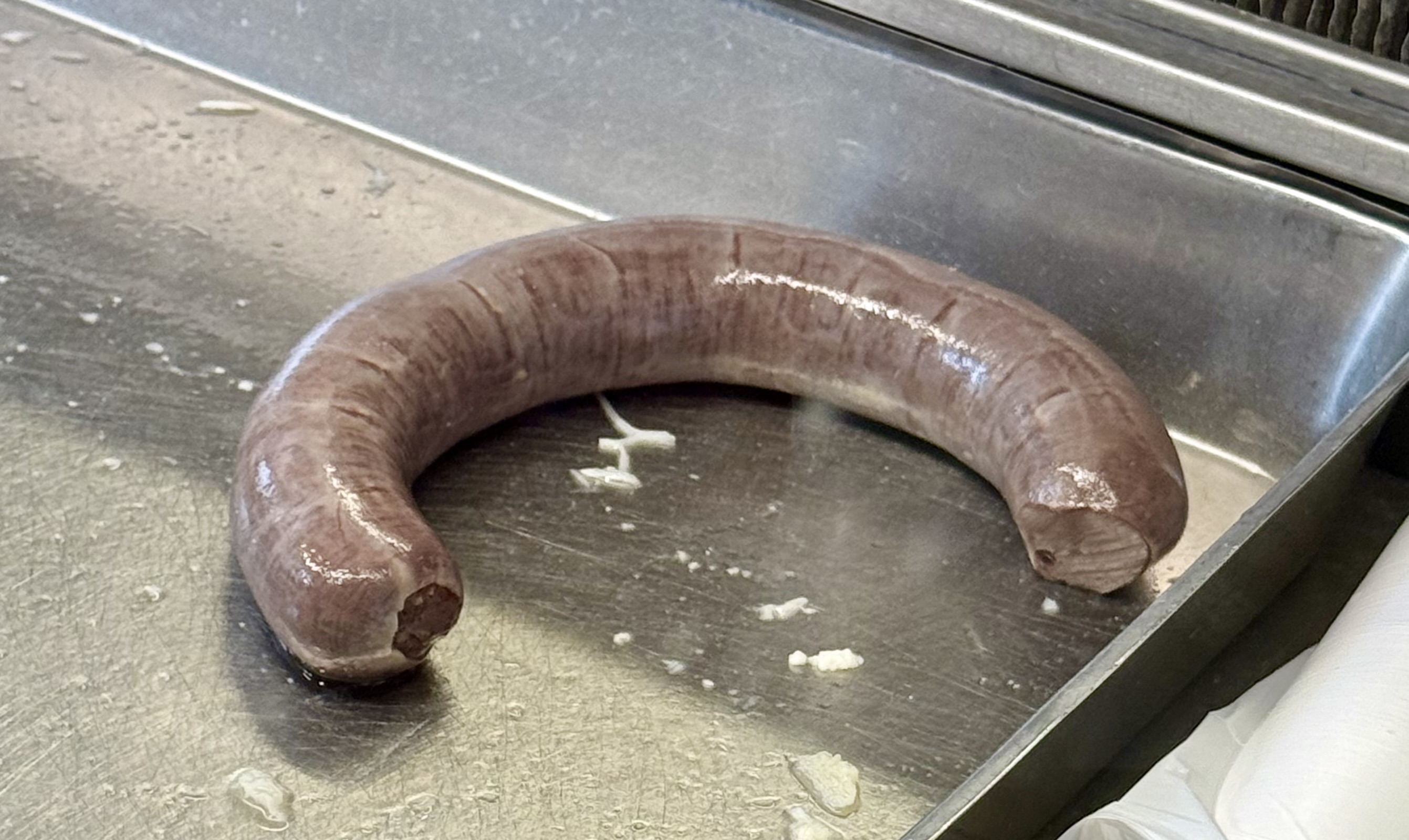
- Loop of Drisheen
- Type: Black pudding
- Place of origin: Ireland
- Main ingredients: Blood (cow, pig or sheep), milk, salt, fat, breadcrumbs
- Variations: Packet & tripe

Drisheen (Irish: drisín) is a type of blood pudding made in Ireland. It is distinguished from other forms of Irish black pudding by having a gelatinous consistency. It is made from a mixture of cow's, pig's or sheep's blood, milk, salt and fat, which is boiled and sieved and finally cooked using the main intestine of an animal (typically a pig or sheep) as the sausage skin. The sausage may be flavoured with herbs. Historically, tansy had sometimes been used as a seasoning for drisheen. However, it has since been discovered to be toxic to humans. The recipe for drisheen varies widely from place to place and it also differs depending on the time of year. Drisheen is a cooked product but it usually requires further preparation before eating. How this is done varies widely from place to place.

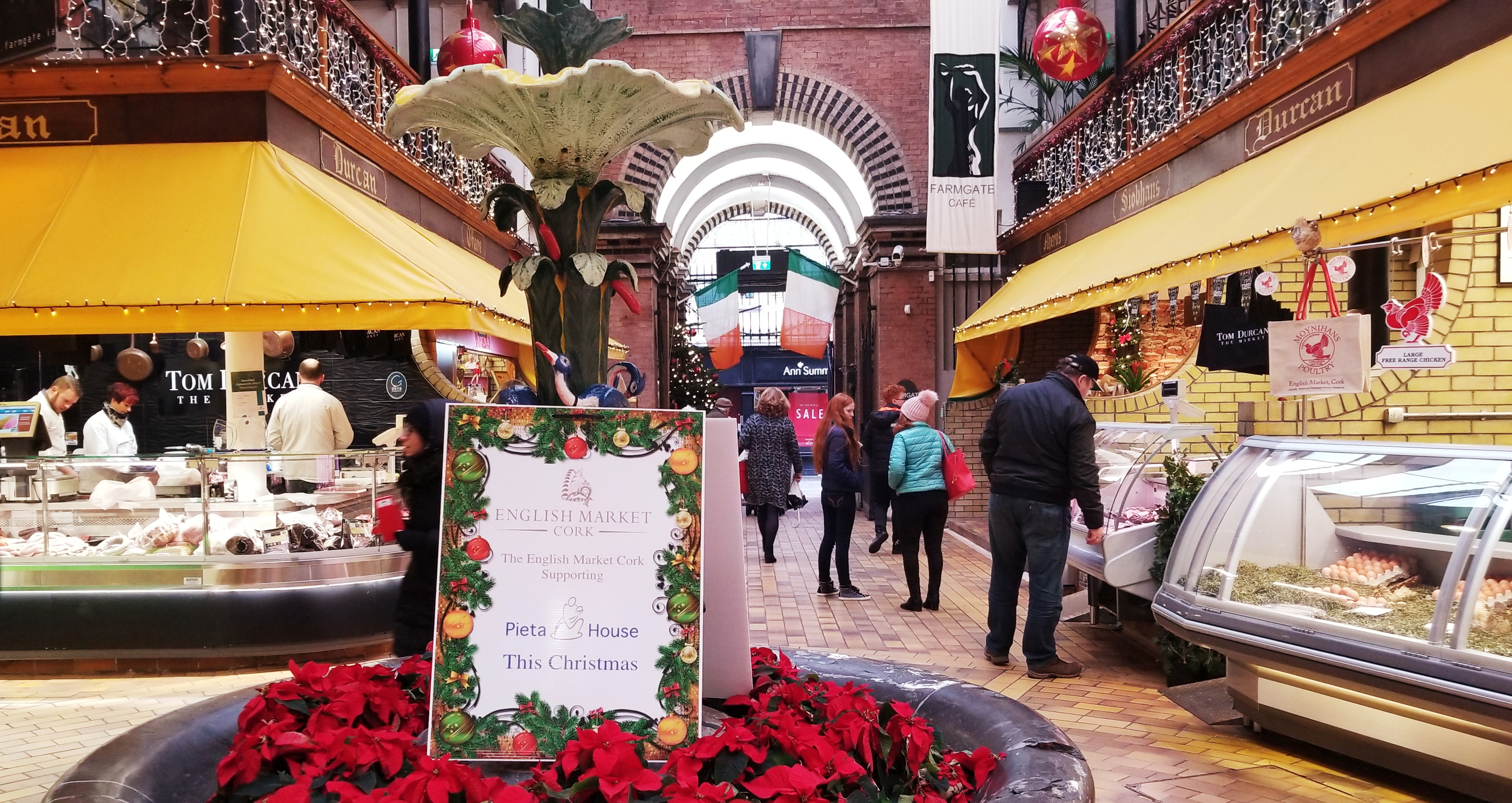
Drisheen for sale in the English Market

In the Irish cities of Cork and Limerick, the dish is often paired with tripe, where it is known as "packet and tripe". In Limerick the combination of tripe and drisheen is considered a meal particular to and strongly associated with Limerick.

== In culture ==
Drisheen is mentioned in James Joyce's Ulysses, Finnegans Wake and A Portrait of the Artist as a Young Man. It is also described in celebrated travel writer H. V. Morton's 1930 book, In Search of Ireland.

== See also ==
- Offal
- Blood sausage
- List of Irish dishes
- List of sausages
