= Kidneys as food =

Type of offal

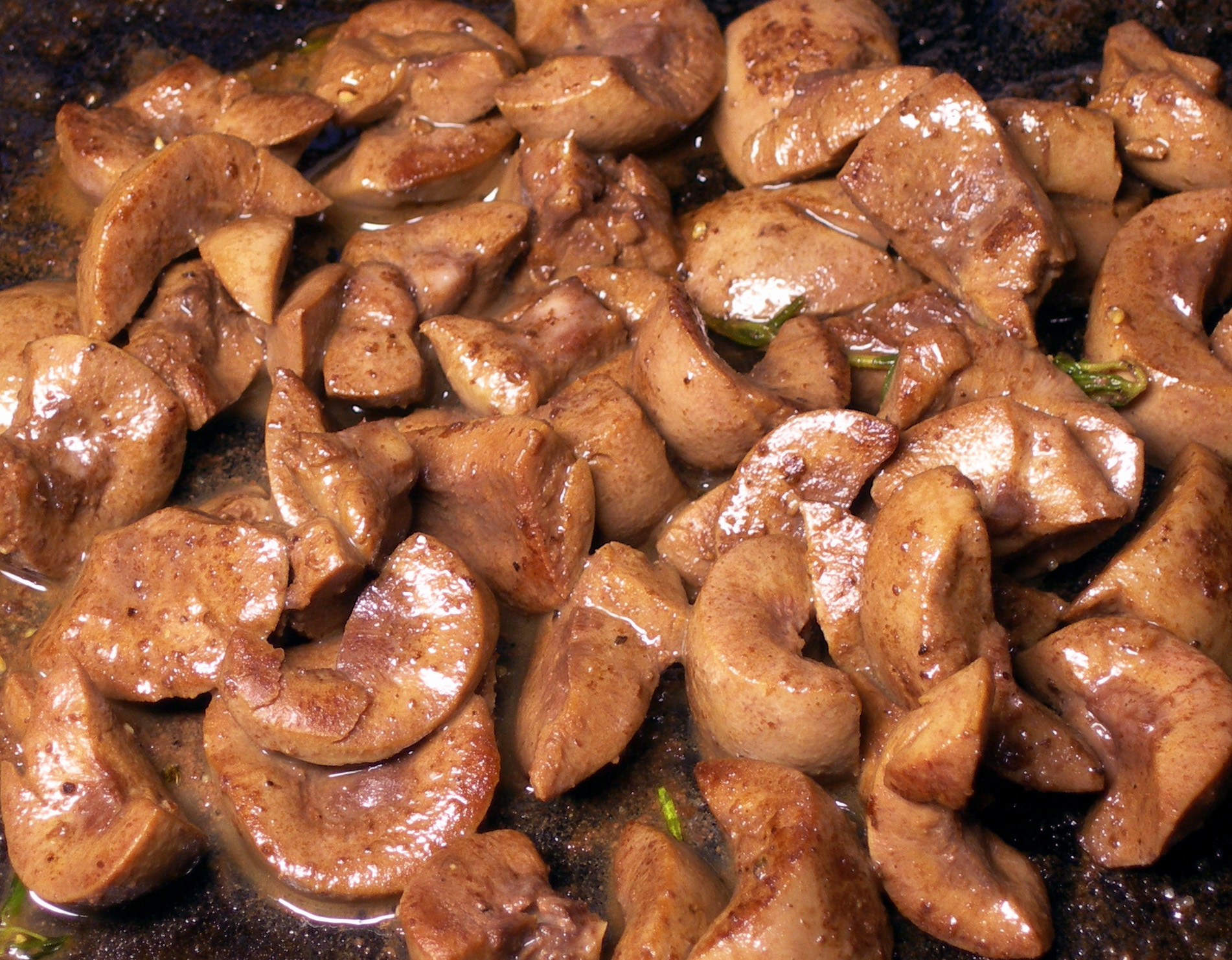
Roasted lamb kidneys

The kidneys of animals are a commonly consumed offal. The kidneys can be grilled, sautéed, roasted or braised. They can be used in cooking meat casseroles, stews or pies. Typically used in cooking are beef, veal, lamb and pork kidneys. Chicken kidneys are used in cooking, too, but fowl kidneys are very small and generally not collected to be used in food separately. Veal kidneys are preferred among cooks. The kidneys of small animals are grilled or fried, and the kidneys of larger ones are usually stewed.

The kidneys are intended to be stored in the refrigerator for no longer than one day, but they also can be frozen. Defrosted kidneys are meant to be used as soon as possible. During grilling or frying, kidneys can be overcooked because they easily dry out. There are different recipes for cooking kidneys including recipes with such ingredients as potatoes, onions, tomatoes, shallot, mushrooms or with other meat.

Kidneys are a good source of proteins, vitamin A, riboflavin (vitamin B_{2} vitamer), niacin (vitamin B_{3}), vitamin B_{12}, iron, phosphorus and zinc. Kidneys, along with liver, contain the most riboflavin compared to other offals and meat. Lamb and beef kidneys contain folate (vitamin B_{9} vitamer). Kidneys also contain small amounts of vitamin C. They are low-fat food, but they contain high amounts of cholesterol.

== History ==
Kidneys have been used in cooking from ancient times. There is evidence of cooked kidneys in ancient Egypt. Egyptians supplied tombs of the dead with everything that dead people would need in the afterlife, including foods such as cooked kidneys. Poor people usually ate bread and boiled vegetables, while wealthy people might eat food of animal origin two or three times a day. Cooked kidneys were found in the Saqqara tomb of a female noble among other dishes.

== See also ==
- Devilled kidneys
- Mixed grill
- Skirts and kidneys
- Steak and kidney pie
