= Spiced beef =

Form of salt beef

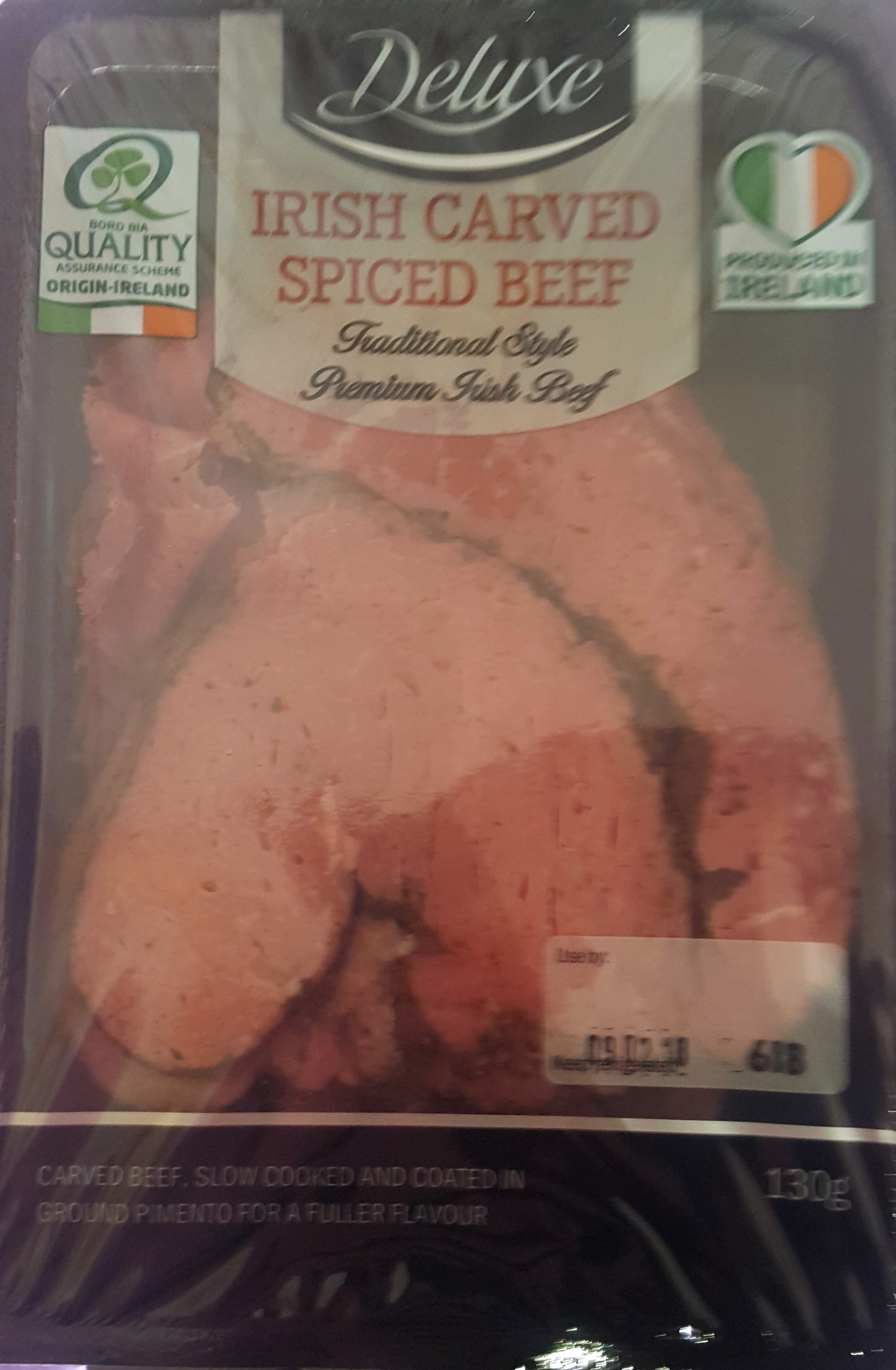
- Packaged/processed spiced beef
- Type: Salt beef
- Main ingredients: Beef
- Ingredients generally used: Spices, saltpetre, water, beer

Spiced beef is a form of salt beef, cured with spices and braised or boiled. It is a traditional festive dish in many countries. In England and Wales it has been known for more than 300 years. It remains a traditional Christmas or New Year dish in Ireland.

== England and Wales ==
Elizabeth David notes that spiced beef has been a familiar dish in English cookery for at least 300 years, sometimes under the name of "Hunting Beef" or "Beef à l'Écarte". A recipe for spiced beef is given in John Simpson's A Complete System of Cookery (1806). He comments, "This is more a Christmas dish, than any other time of the year, not but it may be done any time, and is equally good". His recipe calls for only saltpetre, salt and sugar to be rubbed into the meat every few days for three weeks. He does not specify which cut of beef to use.

David specifies round or silverside, and to Simpson's ingredients she adds crushed black pepper, allspice berries and juniper berries. The last, she notes, appear in old recipes from Yorkshire, Cumberland, Wales, Sussex and other places where juniper grew wild. The spices are rubbed into the meat every day for 9–14 days. The meat is then cooked slowly in a low oven for between 5 and 7½ hours.

In The Oxford Companion to Food, Alan Davidson lists other spices sometimes used in addition to those specified by Simpson and David: cinnamon, cloves, ginger, mace and nutmeg.

== Ireland ==
Unlike England and Wales, where the dish went out of fashion before the 20th century, in Ireland spiced beef (Irish: mairteoil spíosraithe) has remained what Davidson calls "an important part of Christmas fare". The cut of beef in the Irish version varies according to different writers; cuts suggested include round, silverside, topside, rump, and brisket. The meat is rubbed with some or all of the spices mentioned above, and then usually boiled, broiled or semi-steamed in water, Guinness (or a similar stout). It is served cold, usually in thin slices, often with brown bread and apricot and almond chutney. In the modern dish, the use of pink salt (potassium nitrate), preserves the beef and a distinctive pink colour after cooking.

The chef and food writer Rowley Leigh wrote in 2009:

There is a round of spiced beef accompanying a great ham and a magnificent goose at the Misses Morkan's Christmas dance in James Joyce's short story, "The Dead". There is still spiced beef aplenty at butchers' shops in Cork, although it is primarily a Christmas speciality.

In Classic Irish, a 1999 book of Irish recipes, Matthew Drennan writes, "Christmas in Ireland would not be complete without a cold side of spiced beef to see you through the holiday season". The dish remains popular in Cork on Christmas Day, and across Ireland on St Stephen's Day. It is sold year round in some Irish supermarkets.

A "round of spiced beef" is mentioned by James Joyce in the last short story in the Dubliners alongside other traditional Irish Christmas foods, including goose and ham.

== Other countries ==
Davidson mentions that spiced beef is a traditional festive dish in many other countries, but does not specify which. Some spiced beef dishes, including pastrami and Sauerbraten, differ from the English and Irish versions, among other ways, by being wet-cured in brine or other liquid.

== See also ==
- List of Irish dishes

== Sources ==
- David, Elizabeth (2003). Norman, Jill (ed.). Elizabeth David's Christmas. London: Michael Joseph. ISBN 978-0-7181-4670-2.
- Davidson, Alan (1999). The Oxford Companion to Food. Oxford: Oxford University Press. ISBN 978-0-19-211579-9.
- Drennan, Matthew (1999). Classic Irish. London: Hermes House. ISBN 978-1-84038-004-0.
- Simpson, John (1806). A Complete System of Cookery. London: W. Stewart. OCLC 17496738.
