= List of Irish dishes =

This is a list of dishes found in Ireland. Irish cuisine is a style of cooking originating from Ireland, developed or adapted by Irish people. It evolved from centuries of social and political change, and in the 20th and 21st century has more international influences. The cuisine takes its influence from the crops grown and animals farmed in its temperate climate. The introduction of the potato in the second half of the 16th century heavily influenced Ireland's cuisine thereafter and, as a result, is often closely associated with Ireland. Representative Irish dishes include Irish stew, bacon and cabbage, boxty, coddle, and colcannon.

== Irish dishes ==
English name	Irish name	Image	Description
Bacon and cabbage	Bágún agus cabáiste	This is a close up photo of unsliced back bacon with three pieces of boiled potatoes, and with a slice of boiled cabbage. They are seasoned with salt and pepper. The bacon is covered with sauce. They are all placed on a white plate.	Unsliced back bacon boiled together with cabbage and potatoes.
Barmbrack	Bairín breac	Two loaves of bread with sultanas and raisins, served on a tray. The tray is placed on a wooden table. One of the loaf is slightly cut.	A leavened bread with sultanas and raisins.
Batter burger			A fast food consisting of a beef patty cooked in batter, similar to a battered sausage. A Wurly burger (spellings vary) is a batter burger served with a hamburger bun and toppings.
Black pudding	Putóg dhubh	Two pieces of white pudding and two pieces of black pudding served on a white tray. This is a closeup photo of the food.	Sausage made from cooked pig's blood, pork fat, pork rind, pork shoulder, pork liver, oats, onion, rusk (wheat starch, salt), water, salt, pimento and seasoning (rusk, spices). Picture shows slices of black pudding (dark) and white pudding (light).
Boxty	Bacstaí		Finely grated raw potato and mashed potato mixed together with flour, baking soda, buttermilk and occasionally egg, then cooked like a pancake on a griddle pan.
Breakfast roll	Rollóg bhricfeasta		A bread roll filled with elements of a traditional fry-up, designed to be eaten on the way to school or work. It can be purchased at a wide variety of petrol stations, local newsagents, supermarkets and eateries throughout Ireland and Great Britain. Often served alongside the chicken fillet roll, which is filled with "plain" or "spicy" fried chicken breast fillet.
Champ Also known as "poundies"	Brúitín		Mashed potatoes and chopped scallions (spring onions) with butter and milk.
Chicken fillet roll	Rollóg sicín		A bread roll filled with a fillet of processed chicken. It is a ubiquitous deli item in Ireland, served hot.
Coddle	Cadal		Layers of roughly sliced pork sausages, bacon (usually thinly sliced, somewhat fatty back bacon), with sliced potatoes and onions. Exclusive to Dublin.
Colcannon	Cál ceannann		Mashed potatoes with kale or cabbage. Not very popular in Ulster.
Crubeens	Crúibín		Boiled pigs' feet.
Curry chips	Sceallóga curaithe		Chips and a curry sauce. At Chinese takeaways in Ireland, a 3-in-1 consists of curry chips served with fried rice (a 4-in-1 or higher typically adds a portion of chicken balls and/or chicken wings).
Drisheen	Drisín		A type of black pudding, often made from lamb's blood, and soft set. In Cork, it is usually served alongside boiled tripe and onions.
Farl (or soda farl)	Farla		A traditional quick bread or cake, roughly triangular in shape. Particularly associated with Ulster.
Fried bread	Arán friochta		Bread fried in bacon fat.
Full breakfast Also known as "full Irish", "Irish fry" or "Ulster fry"	Bricfeasta friochta		Rashers, sausages and eggs, often served with a variety of side dishes such as fried mushrooms, soda bread and puddings.
Garlic cheese chips	Sceallóga le cáis agus gairleog		Chips with garlic mayonnaise and melted cheddar cheese.
Goody	Gudaí		A dessert dish made by boiling bread in milk with sugar and spices.
Gravy chips			Chips covered with gravy. Very popular in Ulster
Gur cake	Cáca gur		A pastry confection associated with Dublin.
Irish stew	Stobhach/ Stobhach Gaelach		A traditional stew of lamb or mutton, potatoes, carrots, onions, and parsley.
Jambon	Siamban		A folded puff pastry filled with diced ham, egg and cheese, served warm at delicatessens and often eaten at breakfast or elevenses.
Limerick Ham	Liamhás Luimnigh		A particular method of preparing a joint of bacon within the cuisine of Ireland. The method was originally developed in County Limerick, Ireland.
Irish seafood chowder	Seabhdar		A particular method of preparing a seafood soup, often served with milk or cream.
Mashed potato	Brúitín		Prepared by mashing freshly boiled potatoes with a potato masher, fork, ricer, or food mill, or whipping them with a hand beater. Butter and milk are sometimes added.
Pastie	-		A round, battered pie of minced pork, onion, potato and seasoning. Exclusive to Ulster.
Potato bread	Arán prátaí		A flat bread made from potato and flour, dry-fried. A key component of the Ulster fry.
Scone	Scóna		A scone is a single-serving quick bread/cake, usually made of wheat, barley or oatmeal with baking powder as a leavening agent and baked on sheet pans. A scone is often lightly sweetened and occasionally glazed with egg wash.
Shepherd's pie	Pióg an aoire		Shepherd's pie is a lamb or mutton and vegetable mixture with gravy topped with mashed potato.
Skirts and kidneys	íochtar an chliatháin agus duáin		A stew made from pork meat, including the kidneys, bladder, and liver.
Snack box	Sneaicbhosca		A common menu item at fish-and-chip shops, consisting of chips served in a box with two wings or drumsticks of fried chicken. A "lunch box" includes three pieces of chicken, and a "dinner box" four.
Soda bread (known in most of Ulster as wheaten bread)	Arán sóide		A variety of quick bread traditionally made in a variety of cuisines in which sodium bicarbonate ("baking soda" or "bread soda") is used as a leavening agent instead of the more common yeast. The ingredients of traditional soda bread are flour, bread soda, salt, and buttermilk. Sometimes raisins are added to make it sweeter.
Spice bag Also known as "spice box"	Mála spíosrach/ Bosca spíosrach		A fast food sold in Chinese takeaways and fish-and-chip shops, consisting of chips, crispy chicken pieces, peppers, onions and spices mixed together in a bag or box.
Spice burger	Burgar spíosraí		A patty containing beef, beef fat, cereals, onions and spices; coated in breadcrumbs and served as fast food.
Spiced beef	Mairteoil spíosraithe	Irish Spiced Beef	A cured and salted joint of rump steak or silverside beef, which is traditionally served at Christmas or the New Year.
Taco chips			Chips topped with taco mayonnaise, cheese, and a chilli of beef mince, tomatoes, peppers and onions.
White pudding	Putóg bhán		Very similar to black pudding, but containing no blood. Contains pork meat and fat, suet, bread, and oatmeal formed into a large sausage shape. Picture shows slices of white pudding (light) and black pudding (dark).

== See also ==
- List of Republic of Ireland food and drink products with protected status
- List of restaurant chains in Ireland
- Pork in Ireland
