= Trish Deseine =

Irish food writer and cookbook author

Trish Deseine is an Irish food writer and cookbook author; she was born in Northern Ireland, and moved to Paris in 1987.

== Writings and TV programmes ==
In 2000 she was approached by the French publisher, Marabout, to write a cookbook. Her first book Petits plats entre amis was published in 2001 and won the Ladurée and SEB prizes. Her second book, Je veux du chocolat! (2002) won a World Gourmand Cookbook Award and has sold over 500,000 copies to date.

Subsequent books have included Mes petits plats préférés (2003); Fêtes maison (2003) about party food; J'en veux encore (2004) about food for children and Du caramel plein la bouche (2005). For Marabout also, Deseine has produced small format books – Les apéros de Trish, Trifles, Best of Chocolate and Bonbons Forever. Ma petite robe noire et autres recettes (October 2006) explores the connection between wardrobe staples and food (basics, vintage, classics, accessories, etc.). It won the 2007 Prix la Mazille at Périgueux, making Deseine the first non-French writer to receive the prize. A book for the English-speaking market – Nobody Does It Better – which celebrates the best in contemporary French cooking was published by Kyle Cathie in early 2007.

Her first English-language TV series, the twelve part RTÉ/BBC co-production Trish's Paris Kitchen was broadcast in Ireland in 2008 and in the UK in 2009 on UKTV Food. Two further series, Trish's Country Kitchen and Trish's Mediterranean Kitchen were broadcast on RTE, Good Food Channel and BBC Lifestyle. Her second English language book Trish's French Kitchen was published alongside the series in September 2008.

She also produces sweet recipes for French ELLE. Her book Grande table, petite cuisine was published in France in September 2012. Her book The Paris Gourmet (La Gourmande) was published in September 2013.

== Selected works ==
- Petits plats entre amis (2001) Marabout, ISBN 978-2-501-03571-2
- Je veux du chocolat! (2002) Marabout, ISBN 978-2-501-03769-3
- Mes petits plats préférés (2003) Marabout, ISBN 978-2-501-04101-0
- Fêtes Maison (2003) Marabout, ISBN 978-2-501-03768-6
- J'en veux encore! (2004) Marabout, ISBN 978-2-501-04178-2
- Du caramel plein la bouche (2005) Marabout, ISBN 978-2-501-04377-9
- Ma Petite robe noire et autres recettes (2006) Marabout, ISBN 978-2-501-04820-0
- The Paris Gourmet: Restaurants, Shops, Recipes, Tips (2013), Paris: Flammarion. Flammarion Chic Lifestyle, ISBN 978-2-08-020156-0
