= Barmbrack =

Irish bread with sultanas and raisins

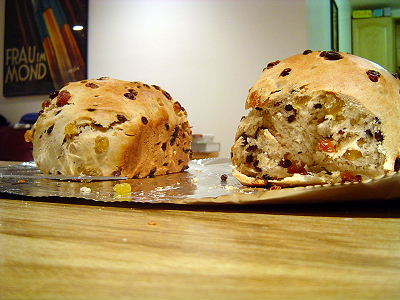
- Two loaves of barmbrack
- Alternative names: Báirín Breac, Boreen brack, Bawreen brack
- Type: Sweet bread
- Place of origin: Ireland
- Main ingredients: Flour, sultanas, raisins

Barmbrack (Irish: bairín breac), also often shortened to brack, is a bread with added sultanas and raisins made with yeast or baking powder. The bread is associated with Halloween in Ireland, where an item (often a ring) is placed inside the bread, with the person receiving it considered to be fortunate.

== Etymology ==
It is sometimes called bairín breac, and the term is also used as two words in its more common version. This may be from the Irish word bairín - transl. a loaf - and breac - transl. speckled (due to the raisins in it), hence it literally means a speckled loaf (a similar etymology to the Welsh bara brith).

Other origins for "barm" could relate to the use of the froth from fermented ale, which is a form of yeast referred to as barm. This was used in place of bicarbonate of soda in baking, as it was not widely available in Ireland until the early 19th century.

== Description ==
Usually sold in flattened rounds, it is often served toasted with butter along with a cup of tea. The dough is sweeter than sandwich bread, but not as rich as cake, and the sultanas and raisins add flavour and texture to the final product. In most recipes, the dried fruit is soaked overnight in cold tea or whiskey.

== Halloween tradition ==
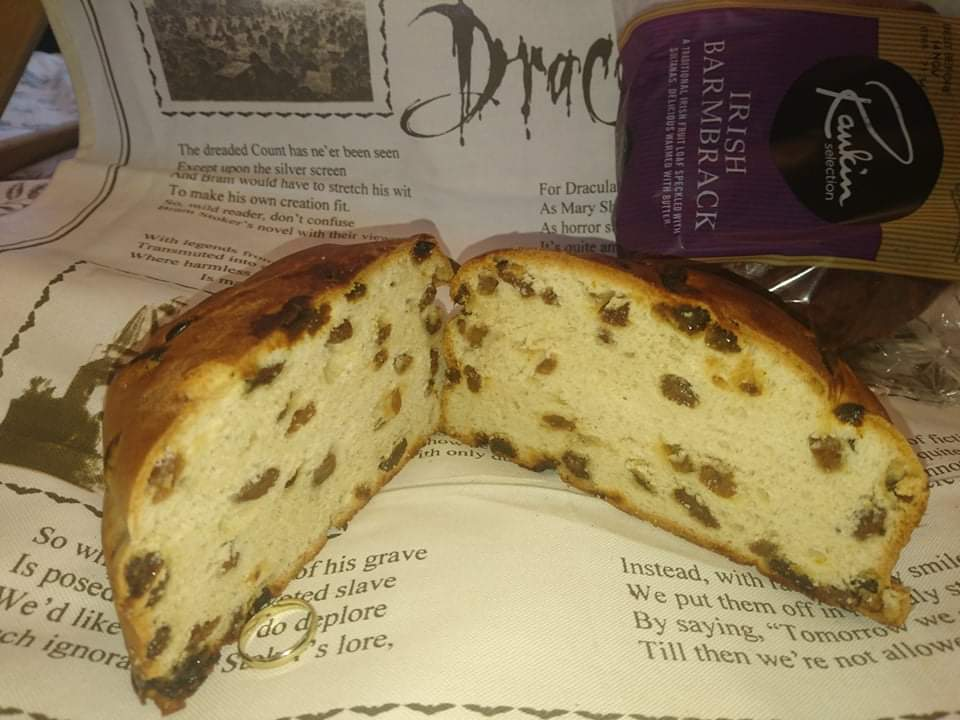
Commercial barmbrack showing ring found inside

Barmbrack is the centre of an Irish Halloween custom. These loaves could be decorated on the top with animals or birds. The Halloween Brack traditionally contained various objects baked into the bread and was used as a sort of fortune-telling game. In the brack were: a pea, a stick, a piece of cloth, a small coin (originally a silver sixpence), a ring, and a bean. Each item, when received in the slice, was supposed to carry a meaning to the person concerned: the pea, the person would not marry that year; the stick, would have an unhappy marriage or continually be in disputes; the cloth or rag, would have bad luck or be poor; the coin, would enjoy good fortune or be rich; the thimble, would remain a bachelor or spinster; the ring, would be wed within the year; and the bean, would have a future without money. Other articles added to the brack include a medallion, usually of the Virgin Mary to symbolise taken a religious vocation, although this tradition is not widely continued in the present day.

Commercially produced barmbracks have been sold in Ireland since the late 19th century. In modern times those sold for the Halloween market still include a toy ring, but due to food safety regulations, they do not contain the other items traditionally included.

== New Year's Eve tradition ==
In many areas of Ireland, it was traditional to bake a large barmbrack on New Year's Eve by the woman of the house. As nightfall approached, three bites would be taken out of the cake by the man of the house and thrown against the front door while invoking the Holy Spirit. This was to ward off poverty or starvation. After an invocation, the family would gather and eat the fragments of cake. In a variant of this tradition from west County Limerick, the door was struck three times with the cake with a different recitation.

== Other references ==
Barmbracks were mentioned in the Van Morrison song "A Sense of Wonder":

Pastie suppers down at Davey's chipper
Gravy rings, barmbracks
Wagon Wheels, Snowballs.

Reference to barmbracks is made in Dubliners by James Joyce. The following is from in the first paragraph of Joyce's short story "Clay":

The fire was nice and bright and on one of the side tables were four very big barmbracks. These barmbracks seemed uncut, but if you went closer you would see that they had been cut into long thick even slices and were ready to be handed round at tea.

Edna O'Brien - "The Country Girls"

Lady Gregory would bring barmbrack from her estate at Coole, County Galway to the Abbey Theatre, Dublin, when she was attending rehearsals there.

== See also ==
- List of breads
- List of Irish dishes
- Bara Brith
- Česnica – similar Serbian tradition, though usually with a coin
