= Crubeens =

Irish dish made of boiled pigs' feet

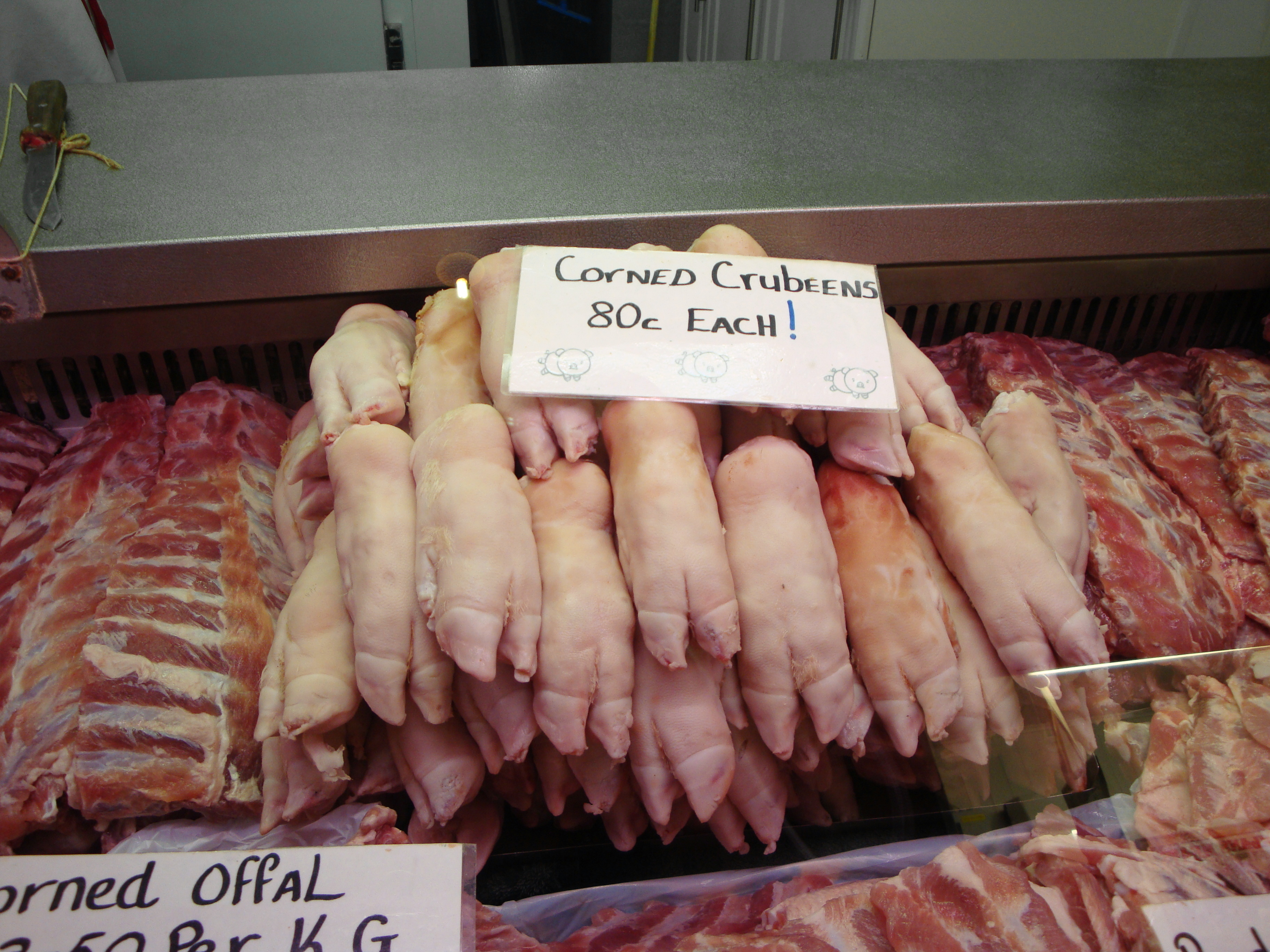
Crubeens for sale.

Crubeens (from Irish crúibín, meaning "pig's trotter") are an Irish dish made of boiled pigs' feet. They are traditionally eaten by hand, like corn on the cob. Crubeens can include the pigs' calves, and can be consumed fried, broiled, baked, or otherwise prepared.

== History ==
They were a common food served in rural Irish pubs, with Theodora Fitzgibbon recounting that as a "country dish" served with "brown soda bread and pints of stout." Like many snacks served in pubs, their salted preparation made patrons more thirsty.

The Irish singer Liam Clancy references them in a preamble to the song The Galway Races, and they are mentioned in the lyrics of some versions as an example of food available at a horse race.

Modern Irish chefs have included crubeens with modernised recipes at their restaurants, including Kevin Thornton.

== See also ==
- List of Irish dishes
