= The Pressure Cooker =

- Starring: Dylan McGrath
- Country of origin: Ireland
- Original language: English
- No. of episodes: 1

Original release
- Network: RTÉ One
- Release: 4 February 2008

The Pressure Cooker is a once-off fly on the wall documentary broadcast on RTÉ One. It follows the successful efforts of celebrity chef Dylan McGrath to obtain a Michelin star for his business, Mint, in Ranelagh, Dublin. It was broadcast on 4 February 2008 at 21:30. McGrath was noted in the Irish media and in the general cuisine profession for his repeated shouting and swearing at his staff during the filming of this documentary.

== Background ==
Prior to the show being filmed only four restaurants in Ireland had obtained a Michelin star. McGrath was described as "a driven, ambitious, determined, innovative, hot-tempered, bad-mouthed and very intense man" by RTÉ and Image food critic Domini Kemp described him as a "creative genius". Mint Restaurant was described by Hot Press as a "gastronomic playground". The restaurant has also received praise from newspaper The Sunday Business Post.

== Controversy ==
McGrath encountered ire from his fellow celebrity chefs for his alleged mistreatment of his staff which was evident during the documentary. Kevin Dundon, who appeared in the show Guerrilla Gourmet with McGrath, appeared alongside him on the television chat show Tubridy Tonight and criticised him live on air, describing his attitude as "appalling" and saying that Gordon Ramsay (a British chef) had "a bit of charisma about himself as well and a huge amount of passion". Dundon also questioned McGrath's methods of training his staff and said he would not have been required to shout at them so much if he had taught them better. Kevin Thornton agreed with Dundon – the two appear together on the reality television series Heat – describing McGrath's comments as "a mess" and "a waste of energy" and suggesting that "people like that will not go very far". Patrick Guilbaud labelled McGrath "sad" on the RTÉ Radio 1 show, Conversations with Eamon Dunphy, after witnessing him shouting and swearing at his Mint staff.
