= Mint (restaurant) =

Coordinates: 53°19′29″N 6°15′15″W

Mint Restaurant

Restaurant information
- Established: 1981
- Closed: April 2009
- Head chef: Dylan McGrath
- Rating: Michelin Guide
- Location: 47 Ranelagh Village, Ranelagh 2, Ireland

Mint Restaurant was a Michelin star–winning restaurant located in Ranelagh, Dublin in Ireland. It was owned by the celebrity chef Dylan McGrath. The restaurant was featured in the 2008 RTÉ One fly on the wall documentary The Pressure Cooker, a programme which led to much complaint from McGrath's fellow chefs in the Irish media about his alleged mistreatment of his staff. The closure of Mint Restaurant was publicised in the Evening Herald on 23 April 2009.

== Praise ==
Image magazine has described Mint Restaurant as "a place of worship" and Hot Press has described the venue as a "gastronomic playground". The Sunday Business Post's Ross Golden Bannon reported: "It is a long, long time since a meal actually haunted me in the way a beautiful painting or a thoughtful book might".

== Controversy ==
McGrath encountered ire from his fellow celebrity chefs for his alleged mistreatment of his staff which was evident during The Pressure Cooker, a documentary which charted McGrath's ultimately successful attempt at gaining a Michelin star. Kevin Dundon, who appeared in the show Guerrilla Gourmet with McGrath, appeared alongside him on the television chat show Tubridy Tonight and criticised him live on air, describing his attitude as "appalling" and saying that Gordon Ramsay (a British chef) had "a bit of charisma about himself as well and a huge amount of passion". Dundon also questioned McGrath's methods of training his staff and said he would not have been required to shout at them so much if he had taught them better. Kevin Thornton agreed with Dundon – the two appear together on the reality television series Heat – describing McGrath's comments as "a mess" and "a waste of energy" and suggesting that "people like that will not go very far". Thornton was not particularly impressed with what McGrath offered in his restaurant, saying: "It is not my type of food" and that McGrath was "working his balls off and it is good for the city but it is not my cup of tea". Patrick Guilbaud labelled McGrath "sad" on the RTÉ Radio 1 show, Conversations with Eamon Dunphy, after witnessing him shouting and swearing at his Mint staff.

== Closure ==
Mint Restaurant was forced to close down in April 2009 due to the economic recession. Speculation built up after the restaurant failed to reopen after a week when it claimed to be on holiday. However, the lights remained switched off and the doors remained closed despite repeated requests by potential customers and the continued advertisement of a pre-planned dinner event. Its closure was heralded by the Evening Herald newspaper as the first of Dublin's "exclusive restaurants" to shut down. Dublin chef Derry Clarke was saddened by this, saying that it upset him "to see a restaurant of that calibre go, lesser restaurants I wouldn't mind seeing them close, but not Mint". The Irish Independent described Mint as "one of the most sublime places to enjoy cutting-edge contemporary cooking".
