= Nick Munier =

British restaurant manager (born 1968)

- Portrait of Munier
- Born: 1968 (age 57–58); Bermondsey, London, England
- Occupation: British television personality
- Children: 3

Nick Munier (born 1968) is a Maitre d'Hotel and restaurant manager. He is best known in the United Kingdom as the Maitre d'Hotel of ITV's prime-time reality show Hell's Kitchen and in Ireland as co-presenter of MasterChef Ireland. He was also a former co-owner of Pichet restaurant in Dublin's Trinity Lane.

== Professional life ==
Munier began his career with the Roux Brothers and was a commis waiter in Le Gavroche amongst other Roux establishments. In 1991, Munier left his native London for Ireland to join the K Club in County Kildare, a Michelin star restaurant and home to the Ryder Cup in 2006. From there, he began his 10 years working with Marco Pierre White, one of Britain's best known chefs and a recipient of 3 Michelin stars, before returning to Ireland.

In 2002, Munier moved to Dublin to join U2's Clarence Hotel, and Ireland's only two Michelin Star restaurant, Restaurant Patrick Guilbaud. Shortly afterwards he moved into the world of consultancy, joining Conor Kenny & Associates. He has also worked as Restaurant Manager in Peacock Alley.

in 2009 he opened his own restaurant, Pichet along with his long-time friend, chef Stephen Gibson.

Toward the end of 2014, Nick sold his shares in Pichet. In March 2015 he opened his new restaurant Avenue by Nick Munier in Crow Street in Dublin City Centre's Temple Bar. Despite receiving the accolade of a Michelin Recommendation, the restaurant unfortunately was forced to close primarily due to a substantial theft in the business by an ex member of staff. The restaurant is now closed.

== Television series ==
Munier has appeared in the last two series of ITV1's Hell's Kitchen with Marco Pierre White.

In mid-2009 Munier landed a six one-hour documentary series about setting up a restaurant in the global recession. All of them were in prime-time slots. The series followed Munier, his wife Denise, long-time friends Stephen Gibson and Natasha McGowan through the up-and-down reality of opening and running a restaurant.

Munier has written an account of his experiences over twenty years at front-of-house in 'Boiling Point: Adventures in the Restaurant Game', published by Y Books.

In September 2011 Munier began co-presenting MasterChef Ireland on RTÉ television alongside chef Dylan McGrath. The programme has proved successful with two further series being broadcast including a celebrity version.

In Sept 2012, Munier also worked on a short eBook called "Nick Munier's Mad Things Customers Say" in which he tells jokes and stories from his time in the restaurant business.

== Personal life ==
The son of an English mother and a French father, Munier was born in 1968 in Bermondsey, south London. In 1988 he spent a year on military service in France. Munier married Denise McBrien and together they have three sons, Conan, Luc, and Alex. The couple split up in 2014.
