= Sammy Leslie =

Irish hotelier and television personality

- Born: 1966 (age 59–60)
- Occupation: Hotelier
- Employer: Self-employed
- Known for: Castle Leslie; Fáilte Towers

Samantha "Sammy" Leslie (born 1966) is a female Irish hotelier, media personality and reality television show judge. She is the trustee of the Castle Leslie estate in County Monaghan, being responsible for a hotel, a spa, an equestrian centre and an organic cookery school. She acted as a judge alongside celebrity chef Derry Clarke and former radio and television presenter Bibi Baskin in the RTÉ One reality television series Fáilte Towers. She has also appeared on television programmes such as the RTÉ One series The Restaurant, where she appeared as a guest critic, and radio programmes such as the RTÉ Radio 1 programme Conversations with Eamon Dunphy.

== Career ==
Leslie is trustee to the Castle Leslie Estate, which her family, the Leslies, have inhabited since 1665. During her early twenties, Leslie began reorganizing the estate, which at that stage was not in the best state of any business. She set up a tearoom and through that venture raised funds to repair a broken roof. Castle Leslie was the venue of the wedding of ex-Beatle Paul McCartney and the former model and charity campaigner Heather Mills in 2002. The estate now has a total of 164 employees.

Leslie was a judge in the Fáilte Towers television programme which was broadcast in August 2008. On 16 November 2008, she was guest critic in an episode of the RTÉ television programme The Restaurant, an episode whose guest chef was Michael Healy-Rae.

In 2007, Leslie was listed among eight finalist for the Ernst and Young Entrepreneur of the Year Award.

== Personal life ==
In an edition of the RTÉ Radio 1 programme Conversations with Eamon Dunphy, presented by Eamon Dunphy and broadcast on Saturday 27 October 2007, Leslie spoke of her close relationship with her father, Desmond Leslie, who was a writer and an RAF pilot, her unusual family life and her experiences being reared in the castle.
