= Thornton's Restaurant =

Coordinates: 53.339353°N 6.261414°W

Thornton's

Restaurant information
- Established: 1989
- Closed: 29 October 2016
- Owner: Kevin & Muriel Thornton
- Head chef: Kevin Thornton
- Food type: International, French, Irish, Modern Irish
- Rating: Michelin Guide
- Location: 128 St. Stephen’s Green, Dublin, Ireland
- Seating capacity: 60
- Website: http://www.thorntonsrestaurant.com

Thornton's was a restaurant that was housed, in the period 2002–2016, in the Fitzwilliam Hotel, St. Stephen's Green, County Dublin, Ireland. It was previously located on Portobello Road since 1989. It became a fine dining restaurant, that held a one-star Michelin rating in the periods 1996-2000 and 2006–2015. In the period 2001-2005 it held a two-star rating. The restaurant closed on 29 October 2016. The space is now occupied by Glovers Alley.

Head chef Kevin Thornton was the first Irish chef to achieve two Michelin stars. Patrick Guilbaud received his second star first but was born in France.

== Origin ==
Thornton's Restaurant was opened in the Fitzwilliam Hotel on St Stephen's Green in 2002.

== Controversy ==
Thornton's Restaurant was embroiled in a controversy in 2007 surrounding Thornton's alleged refusal to sell chips to his restaurant customers, sparking comparisons to British chef Gordon Ramsay. A customer requested the food but, upon receiving it, he changed his mind and sent them back to the kitchen. Thornton then allegedly emerged from the kitchen with the chips and slammed them down on the man's table, with the remark: “They were cooked specially for you, so you eat them, you dickhead”. He later is alleged to have called them "wankers" before removing them from his restaurant.

Asked about the incident by broadcaster Joe Duffy on his RTÉ Radio 1 Liveline programme, Thornton stressed that he had not so much been infuriated by the request of chips (he supposedly provides them for younger customers on a regular basis) but that he had been aggravated by the attitude of this particular customer. The incident has since seen Thornton become associated with a dislike of chips and, as recently as 2009, has been crafted as a pun by the Irish media for any other outlet which does not serve the food. Thornton has also spoken out against serving food such as pizza in his restaurant.

== Awards ==
Thornton was named Food & Wine Magazine's Chef of the Year for Ireland in 2007. His restaurant had two Michelin stars but it lost one of them; one newspaper at the time portrayed a cartoon of Thornton setting the Michelin Guide alight.

== Trivia ==
- Kevin Thornton bought the former Michelin starred restaurant Peacock Alley in 2002 after the Fitzwilliam Hotel had cancelled the lease with Conrad Gallagher.
