= Conversations with Eamon Dunphy =

Irish radio programme

- Genre: Talk
- Running time: 50 minutes
- Country of origin: Ireland
- Language: English
- Home station: RTÉ Radio 1
- Hosted by: Eamon Dunphy
- Produced by: Sarah Binchy
- Recording studio: Donnybrook, Dublin
- Original release: 30 September 2006 – 30 June 2009
- Website: www.rte.ie/radio1/eamondunphy/
- Podcast: Podcast

Conversations with Eamon Dunphy is an Irish radio programme, on which Eamon Dunphy interviewed various celebrities. It aired on Saturdays on RTÉ Radio 1.

On 7 July 2009, Dunphy announced he would cease presenting his programme, to concentrate on sport.

== Format ==
After news and paper reviews, Eamon Dunphy presented Conversations with Eamon Dunphy on RTÉ Radio 1 from 09:10. The programme was divided into three parts, each separated by a commercial break. Many high-profile guests have appeared on the programme. There is one guest every week. Typically the guest discussed their life and career. They were asked to request three pieces of music during the programme. The programme is pre-recorded.

== History ==
=== Series 1 ===
Series 1 comprised 38 episodes. Notable guests from series 1 included: Seán Óg Ó hAilpín, Maeve Binchy, Anne Robinson, Gay Byrne, Michael O'Leary and Sebastian Barry.

Date	Guest	Link
30 September 2006	Noel Pearson	
7 October 2006	Seán Óg Ó hAilpín	
14 October 2006	Gillian Bowler	
21 October 2006	Ger Colleran	
28 October 2006	Maeve Binchy	
4 November 2006	Anne Robinson	
11 November 2006	Richard Corrigan	
18 November 2006	Alan Dukes	
25 November 2006	Bill Whelan	
2 December 2006	Anna Nolan	
9 December 2006	Eddie Macken	
16 December 2006	Harry Crosbie	
23 December 2006	Mícheál Ó Muircheartaigh	
30 December 2006	Robert Ballagh	
6 January 2007	Máire Geoghegan-Quinn	
13 January 2007	Mary Kenny	
20 January 2007	Fr. Peter McVerry	
27 January 2007	Lord Henry Mountcharles	
3 February 2007	John Ryan	
10 February 2007	Michael O'Leary	
17 February 2007	Niamh Brennan	
24 February 2007	Gay Byrne	
3 March 2007	Patricia Casey	
10 March 2007	Ted Walsh	
17 March 2007	Lara Marlowe	
24 March 2007	Maurice Nelligan	
31 March 2007	Stephen Rea	
7 April 2007	Mick O'Dwyer	
14 April 2007	Dickie Rock	
21 April 2007	John Lonergan	
28 April 2007	Mick Wallace	
5 May 2007	John Waters	
12 May 2007	Brenda Fricker	
19 May 2007	Sebastian Barry	
2 June 2007	Nuala O'Loan	
9 June 2007	Anne Madden	
16 June 2007	Ivan Yates	
23 June 2007	Geraldine Kennedy	
30 June 2007	Noelle Campbell-Sharp	

=== Series 2 ===
Series 2 comprised 44 episodes and notable guests from series 2 included: Dana Rosemary Scallon, Shane Ross, Martin McGuinness, Samantha Power, Sinéad O'Connor and Declan Ganley.

Date	Guest	Link
8 September 2007	Pat Rabbitte	
15 September 2007	Liam Clancy	
22 September 2007	Edna O'Brien	
29 September 2007	Adele King	
6 October 2007	Nickey Brennan	
13 October 2007	Michael Colgan	
20 October 2007	Lainey Keogh	
27 October 2007	Sammy Leslie	
3 November 2007	Dana Rosemary Scallon	
10 November 2007	Brendan Gleeson	
17 November 2007	John Crown	
24 November 2007	David McWilliams	
1 December 2007	Brendan Balfe	
8 December 2007	PJ Mara	
15 December 2007	Tommy Tiernan	
22 December 2007	Colm Tóibín	
25 December 2007	Conor O'Clery	
29 December 2007	Dr Robert Gallo	
5 January 2008	John Kelleher	
12 January 2008	Maria Doyle Kennedy	
19 January 2008	Chuck Feeney	
26 January 2008	Shane Ross	
2 February 2008	Harry Gregg	
9 February 2008	Bill O'Herlihy	
16 February 2008	Charlie McCreevy	
23 February 2008	Martin McGuinness	
1 March 2008	Patrick Guilbaud	
8 March 2008	Mary Black	
15 March 2008	Jeananne Crowley	
22 March 2008	Fiach Mac Conghail	
29 March 2008	Graeme Souness	
5 April 2008	Robert Fisk	
12 April 2008	Alan Gilsenan	
19 April 2008	Alice Leahy	
26 April 2008	Eddie O'Sullivan	
3 May 2008	Samantha Power	
10 May 2008	Sinéad O'Connor	
17 May 2008	Mandy Johnston	
24 May 2008	Garry Hynes	
31 May 2008	Geoffrey Wheatcroft	
7 June 2008	Miriam O'Callaghan	
14 June 2008	Declan Ganley	
21 June 2008	Gabriel Byrne	
28 June 2008	Eamonn McCann	
5 July 2008	Marian Keyes	

=== Series 3 ===
Series 3 comprised 39 episodes and notable guests from series 3 included: Louis Walsh, Sonia O'Sullivan, Mary Coughlan and Neil Jordan.

Date	Guest	Link
13 September 2008	Pat Hickey	
20 September 2008	Richard Boyd Barrett	
27 September 2008	Phil Coulter	
4 October 2008	Louis Walsh	
11 October 2008	Eddie Hobbs	
18 October 2008	Niall Tóibín	
25 October 2008	Tom Keane	
1 November 2008	Bruce Morrison	
8 November 2008	Brendan Bowyer	
15 November 2008	Sonia O'Sullivan	
22 November 2008	Jessica Harrington	
29 November 2008	Paddy Kelly	
6 December 2008	Bill Cullen	
13 December 2008	Brendan Walsh	
20 December 2008	Mick Fitzgerald	
27 December 2008	Noel V Ginnity	
3 January 2009	Niall O'Dowd	
10 January 2009	Dylan McGrath	
17 January 2009	Tomi Reichental	
24 January 2009	Ed Walsh	
31 January 2009	Mary Coughlan	
7 February 2009	Izabela Chudzicka	
14 February 2009	Paul Mooney	
21 February 2009	Liam Cunningham	
28 February 2009	John Montague	
7 March 2009	Des Bishop	
14 March 2009	Paddy Cole	
21 March 2009	Mike Soden	
28 March 2009	Anne Anderson	
4 April 2009	Gene Kerrigan	
11 April 2009	Caroline Casey	
18 April 2009	Dessie Hynes	
25 April 2009	Neil Jordan	
2 May 2009	John O'Conor	
9 May 2009	Tim Severin	
16 May 2009	Roy Brindley	
23 May 2009	Johnny Murtagh	
30 May 2009	Mick Lally	
6 June 2009	Billy Gaff	
13 June 2009	Felipe Contepomi	
