= Derry Clarke =

Irish chef and television personality

- Occupation: Chef
- Employer: Self-employed
- Known for: Michelin star, television career
- Spouse: Sallyanne Clarke

Derry Clarke is an Irish celebrity chef, and was the proprietor of the restaurant L'Ecrivain. He has also been a reality television judge, having acted as a judge alongside Bibi Baskin and Sammy Leslie on the RTÉ One reality television series Fáilte Towers, and has appeared on other programmes such as The Restaurant, The Afternoon Show and The Panel (in 2008).

== Career ==
In 1977 and worked in Le Coq Hardi in Dublin for four years, under John Howard. He also worked for eight years in Le Bon Appétit in Dublin.

Clarke has received international recognition, having been inducted into Food & Wine Magazine's "Hall of Fame" and been granted a five-star review by The New York Times. The newspaper described his restaurant as "superb" and "a good spot to linger" while in Dublin.

Clarke's recipes feature in publications such as the Irish Independent and the Evening Herald.

When Ranelagh's Dylan McGrath owned Mint shut down in 2009, Clarke expressed his sadness to the Evening Herald.

== Personal ==
Derry Clarke is married to Sallyanne. He had two children, a son and a daughter. His son died 31 December 2012, at the age of 16. Clarke had a double bypass operation in December 2013, after a warning that there was a family history of heart problems, that made him extra vulnerable for a heart attack.
