= Head Chef (TV program) =

- Starring: Conrad Gallagher; Harry Marquart; Mary Scott; Phillip Roe; Jessie Treacy; Jennifer Ryan; Emma Burke; David O'Sullivan; Eugenie Daskalakis
- Country of origin: Ireland
- No. of episodes: 8

Production
- Producer: Sideline Productions
- Running time: 60 minutes

Original release
- Network: TV3
- Release: April 8 – May 27, 2011

Related
- Celebrity Head Chef (2011–present); Junior Head Chef

Head Chef is an Irish cookery series on TV3, one of Ireland's national broadcasters. The series featured Conrad Gallagher, the youngest ever chef to win a Michelin star, and aired from 8 April 2011 to 27 May 2011.

== Finalists ==
Head Chef premiered with 16 contestants, by the end of the first episode, Conrad had whittled them down to 8 finalists. These finalists continued to be eliminated one episode at a time until only one remained.

=== Harry Marquart ===
At just 19 years old, Harry was the youngest contestant, but managed to go on to win the competition. Harry is in his 2nd year of Culinary Studies at Cork IT. For the final, he made Seabass, Pork Belly, Ashed Leeks, Cep Cream as a starter, Braised neck of venison as his main course, and Tart Tatin with vanilla ice cream as his dessert. Harry is from West Cork and has said his greatest influence is his brother. His ultimate ambition is to have a Michelin Star and his favorite kitchen implement is a knife. Harry's signature dish is John Dory with caper, orange and anchovy dressing.

=== Mary Scott ===
The runner up, Mary is a Trainee Chef from Navan, County Meath. For the final, she made Spring Pea and Asparagus Soup as a starter, Slow Roast Shoulder of Spring Lamb as her main course, and Summer Berry and Sauvignon blanc Terrine as her dessert. Dyslexia forces Mary to focus on creative aspects of life, especially cooking. Mary's favorite kitchen implement is her hot pink Kitchen Aid. Her signature dish is King Prawn and cheery tomato risotto.

=== Phillip Roe ===
Phillip was eliminated in the second to last episode of the series, finishing in third place. A native of Dundrum, Dublin, 21-year-old Phillip was the second youngest in the competition after the eventual winner, 19-year-old Harry Marquart. He is a Health and Nutrition Student at DIT and part-time commis chef in Reeves, Templeogue. His ultimate ambition is to open his own country restaurant that serves good food at a good price. Phillip's greatest influences are Gordon Ramsay and René Redzepi. His signature dish is green pea risotto, pan seared hake with roasted root vegetables and a celeriac puree, apple tart tartan with whiskey and vanilla ice cream. Phillip used to play soccer for Wayside Celtic.

=== Jessie Treacy ===
Jessie was eliminated in the sixth episode of the series, finishing in fourth place. Jessie is from Ranelagh, Dublin, and works part-time as a kitchen porter. His favorite kitchen implement is a whisk and his ultimate ambition is to provide a good quality of life for his family. His signature dish is chorizo risotto with poached runny egg on the top, pan fried sea bass crushed potato sauce vierge. Jessie used to play for Ireland in both snooker and pool.

=== Jennifer Ryan ===
Jennifer was eliminated in the fifth episode of the series after running out of the kitchen in tears during a challenge, finishing in fifth place. Jennifer is from Dundalk, County Louth and works part-time as a sous chef. Her favorite kitchen implement is a hand blender and her ultimate ambition is to run her own restaurant abroad. Jennifer's signature dish is Beef Wellington.

=== Emma Burke ===
Emma was eliminated in the fourth episode of the series, finishing in sixth place. She was the last contestant in the competition without any formal experience working in a kitchen. Emma is originally from Boyle, County Roscommon, but is currently living in Ballinacarrow, County Sligo, where she is Head of Accounts with Ocean FM. Her favourite kitchen implement is a good knife and Emma's signature dish is red pepper & lime soup and prawn & monkfish curry.

=== David O'Sullivan ===
David was eliminated in the third episode of the series, finishing in seventh place. He was the second to last contestant in the competition without any formal experience working in a kitchen. David is from Donaghmede, Dublin and is employed as a Call Centre Operator. His greatest influences are Marco Pierre White and Jamie Oliver and his favorite kitchen implement is a good knife. His ultimate ambition is to be a chef in a respected restaurant. David's signature dish is Duck breast with blueberry and jalapeño sauce. He is a self-confessed trekkie and collects comic books in his spare time.

=== Eugenie Daskalakis ===
Eugenie was eliminated in the second episode of the series, finishing in eighth place. Eugenie is originally from South Africa but is currently living in Kinsale, County Cork. Her favorite kitchen implement is a good knife and her ultimate ambition is to own her own bistro. Eugenie's signature dish is chicken and spinach lasagna and baked vanilla cheesecake.

== Episodes ==
=== Episode 1 ===
After a master class with renowned chef Conrad Gallagher on the preparation of Pan Seared Dover Sole with Lemon, Butter, Green Beans & Almonds, contestants were asked to prepare the dish on their own and two contestants were eliminated (Marc Valentine and Jodie Ryder). Next, Conrad asked the contestants to Carve a chicken for Sauté. At the conclusion of this challenge, two more contestants were eliminated (Ashley O'Driscoll and Gary Byrne). After their chickens were carved, contestants were asked to use the chicken to prepare Coq Au Vin. Four more contestants were eliminated (Kate, Patrick, Dave Farrell, Garret McCarthy), leaving only 8 finalists.

Eliminated (in order of elimination): Marc Valentine, Jodie Ryder, Ashley O'Driscoll, Gary Byrne, Kate, Patrick, Dave Farrell, Garret McCarthy

=== Episode 2 ===
Contestants were asked to prepare Pumpkin Soup with roasted scallops and Black Trompette Mushrooms and Loin of Lamb with Ratatouille and choice of Couscous. At the end of the challenge, Eugenie was eliminated.

Eliminated: Eugenie

=== Episode 3 ===
Contestants were asked to fillet and clean fresh squid and a choice of accompaniment, prepare a fillet of beef with ravioli and goats cheese with a celeriac fondant, and a dessert made from a selection of ingredients. At the end of the challenge, David, the second to last contestant remaining with no formal cookery training, was eliminated.

Eliminated: David

=== Episode 4 ===
Contestants were asked to prepare langoustines in garlic, chili and basil, bone a duck and cook the perfect duck breast, and classic orange soufflé with a garnish of their choice. At the end of the challenge, Emma, the last contestant remaining with no formal cookery training, was eliminated.

Eliminated: Emma

=== Episode 5 ===
Expert chefs Gary O'Hanlon, who was named in Bridgestone Guide's Top 100 restaurants in Ireland Guide for 2010 as one of Ireland's Top 10 chefs to watch in 2010, and Stefan Matz, named 'best chef' in the 2010 Ireland Good Eating Guide, come in to teach the masterclasses this week. First, contestants are asked to prepare Gary O'Hanlon's crab dish, then Stefan Matz's venison dish. At the end of the challenge, Jennifer is eliminated.

Eliminated: Jennifer

==== Featured guests ====
Gary O'Hanlon came to the 5th episode of Head Chef to teach a master class on a crab dish to the contestants. In 2003, he was named one of Boston's best chefs for his work in Devlins. Through his involvement in the restaurant, Devlins was named one of America's rising stars of 2004. Boston Magazine named Devlins one of Boston's best restaurants for 2004/2005. In 2005, he returned to Ireland and began the planning of Viewmont House, which opened in 2008. Viewmont House was soon included in many respected guides of places to stay and eat, including the Mitchelin Guide, Georgina Cambell, Karen Brown, Fodor's, Lucinda O'Sullivan, and Bridgestone Guide's Top 100 restaurants in Ireland Guide for 2010, where he was singled out as one of Ireland's Top 10 chefs to watch in 2010. Irish Independent named them one of Ireland's Top 10 places to eat and stay in Ireland.

Stefan Matz came to Head Chef to teach a master class on a venison dish. A native German, he was appointed executive chef for Ashford Castle in County Mayo and was named 'Best Chef' in Ireland in the 2010 Ireland Good Eating Guide. He has worked in several of the world's most prestigious kitchens and has received over 20 awards and accolades, including a Michelin Star to Great Britain and Ireland.

=== Episode 6 ===
Contestants were each asked to prepare a dish from a tasting menu consisting of Celeriac Soup with Salmon and Langoustine, Roasted Scallop and Braised Lamb Shank with Butternut Moussilin, Mushroom Risotto and Duxelle with Shreaded Confit Duck Leg and Roasted Duck Breast, and Mango and Coriander Cheesecake with a Chili and Mango Sorbet for friends and family and 3 top Irish Critics. At the end of the challenge, Jessie was eliminated.

Eliminated: Jessie

==== Featured guests ====
Lucinda O'Sullivan is a food critic with a weekly column in the Sunday Independent. She is a judge on both the Restaurant Association of Ireland/ Sunday Independent Restaurant Awards and The Food & Wine Magazine Awards. She has also published Her Little Black Book of Places to Stay & Eat in Ireland.

Myles McWeeney was a columnist with the Irish Independent for 25 years, specializing in food and wine. He took a voluntary redundancy from the newspaper in 2007 and is now food and wine editor for Social & Personal magazine.

Caroline Byrne was a contributing writer with Food & Wine magazine. She was a staff writer then editor of food and drink industry publication, ShelfLife. She is the wine columnist for The Irish Garden magazine and sits on the TASTE council of Ireland.

=== Episode 7 ===
The remaining 3 contestants were each asked to prepare two courses from a six course menu consisting of Pan Seared Scallop on a Bed of Celeriac Moussilin with Bacon Crisps (Phillip), Cured Salmon with Pistachio Crust, Potato Salad and Chive (Harry), Butternut Squash Risotto, Loin of Lamb over Tapenade on Toast (Mary), Roast Breast of Duck with Carrot Puree, Trompette Mushroom and Truffle Foam (Phillip), Cubre Libre Jelly with Lime Cream and Cinnamon Tuile (Mary), and Chocolate and Mint Fondant with Strawberry Sorbet, Strawberry Tartar and Apple Crisp (Harry) in Conrad's restaurant, Salon des Sauveurs. At the end of the challenge, Phillip was eliminated, leaving only Harry and Mary to continue on to the Final.

Eliminated: Phillip

==== Featured guests ====
Matthew Fuller, Bruno Berta, Candice Gallagher

=== Episode 8 ===
The two remaining finalists, Harry Marquart and Mary Scott, face off in the final episode of the series, where they're each asked to prepare a three course meal for a restaurant of 60 VIPs, including Ray Foley, Martin King, Karen Koster, Allen Cantwell, and Elaine Crowley. Mary prepared Spring Pea and Asparagus Soup for her starter, Slow Roast Shoulder of Spring Lamb for her main, and Summer Berry and Sauvignon blanc Terrine for her dessert. Harry prepared Seabass, Pork Belly, Ashed Leeks, Cep Cream for his starter, Braised neck of venison for his main, and Tart Tatin for his dessert. At the end of the final challenge, Conrad named Harry as Head Chef because of his consistency over the course of the entire series.

Runner-Up: Mary

Head Chef: Harry

==== Featured guests ====
Friends and Family of Harry and Mary, Former Contestants, Ray Foley, Martin King, Karen Koster, Allen Cantwell, Elaine Crowley

== Production ==
The series was produced by Sideline Productions for TV3. Episodes 1–6 were filmed at ITT Athlone, Episode 7 was filmed in Conrad's restaurant, Salon de Sauveurs, and the Final was filmed in the Weston Hotel in Dublin.

== See also ==
- MasterChef
- Chef de cuisine
