= MasterChef Ireland =

- Genre: Cooking
- Judges: Dylan McGrath; Nick Munier
- Narrated by: Lorraine Pilkington (2011–16); Aoibhéann McCann (2017–)
- Country of origin: Ireland
- Original language: English
- No. of seasons: 5
- No. of episodes: 58

Production
- Executive producer: Larry Bass
- Production location: Dublin
- Running time: 54 minutes
- Production companies: Shine Group in association with Ziji productions distributed by Shine International; Screentime ShinAwiL

Original release
- Network: RTÉ Two
- Release: 8 September 2011 – 6 March 2017

Related
- MasterChef Australia

MasterChef Ireland is an RTÉ television cooking game show based on the international format created by Franc Roddam.

As of late 2016 the series has moved to TV3, the fourth season is expected to air as part of the TV3 Autumn 2016 schedule beginning with Celebrity Masterchef Ireland.

== Judges ==
Robin Gill and Daniel Clifford have been confirmed as the new judges on the 2017 season of the show on TV3 Ireland. Previous judges included Dylan McGrath and Nick Munier.

== Narrator ==
Lorraine Pilkington was the show's narrator until 2013. Aoibhéann McCann narrates Celebrity Masterchef Ireland 2017.

== Series overview ==
Season	Contestants	Episodes	Originally released		Winner	Runner(s)-up
Season	Contestants	Episodes	First released	Last released	Winner	Runner(s)-up
1	16	12	September 8, 2011	October 13, 2011	Mary Carney	Brídín Carey & Mike Curran
2	16	12	October 4, 2012	December 13, 2012	Tamarin Blackmur	Nicha Maguire & Terry Lyons
3	10	20	March 4, 2014	May 7, 2014	Diana Dodog	Edel Byrne & Niamh Mannion

=== Celebrity MasterChef ===
Season	Contestants	Episodes	Originally released		Winner	Runner(s)-up
Season	Contestants	Episodes	First released	Last released	Winner	Runner(s)-up
1	8	6	July 14, 2013	August 18, 2013	David Gillick	Aengus Mac Grianna
2	10	8	January 16, 2017	March 6, 2021	Niamh Kavanagh	Oisín McConville & Simon Delaney

== Contestants ==
=== Series 1 (2011) ===
Contestant	Age	Hometown	Occupation	Status
Mary Carney	28	Waterford	Business Manager	Winner October 13
Brídín Carey	28	County Tipperary	Occupational Therapist	Runners-Up October 13
Mike Curran	37	Limerick	District Manager	Runners-Up October 13
Christine O'Sullivan	21	Cork	Architectural Student	Eliminated October 6
Clare-Anne O'Keefe	34	Cork	Market Stall Assistant	Eliminated October 4
Pierce Maher	34	Wexford	Unemployed	Eliminated September 29
Shane Cullinan	40	Cork	Pharmaceutical Manager	Eliminated September 29
Conal Markey	38	Dublin	Technology Manager	Eliminated September 27
Richard Speedie	43	Dublin	Audio Video Manager	Eliminated September 22
Jarek Baryga	34	Dublin	Assistant Restaurant Manager	Eliminated September 20
Barry Finnegan	29	Dundalk	Care Worker	Eliminated September 15
Grant Jacobs	40	Dublin	Account Manager	Eliminated September 15
Jackie Doran	44	Blanchardstown	Housewife	Eliminated September 13
Kevin MacNamidhe	63	Navan	Independent TV Producer	Eliminated September 13
Mandy Scott	45	Dublin	Personal Assistant	Eliminated September 13
Nadia Mathiasen	28	Dublin	Journalist & Food Writer	Eliminated September 13

=== Series 2 (2012) ===
A second season was announced on 15 February 2012. It premiered on 4 October 2012 at 9:30 on RTÉ Two. The final of the second season aired on 12 & 13 December 2012 and was won by Tamarin Blackmur.

Contestant	Age	Hometown	Occupation	Status
Tamarin Blackmur	35	Dublin	PMO Coordinator	Winner December 13
Nichaphat "Nicha" Maguire	35	Navan	Business Owner	Runners-Up December 13
Terry Lyons	36	Dublin	Product Manager	Runners-Up December 13
Brian Topping	42	Dublin	Sales And Purchasing	Eliminated December 6
Sinéad Considine	38	Dublin	Interior Designer / Milliner	Eliminated November 29
Fidelma Boyce	31	Dublin	Audit Manager	Eliminated November 22
Jacinta Caraher	37	Monaghan	Organic Farm Worker	Eliminated November 22
Andy Spencer	49	Dalkey	Unemployed	Eliminated November 15
Conn Mac Cormaic	27	Kilbarrack	Unemployed	Eliminated November 8
Simon Morris	30	Dublin	Business Lecturer	Eliminated November 1
Joe Somers	44	Dublin	Flight Operations Controller	Eliminated October 25
Nick McClune	40	Swords	Unemployed	Eliminated October 25
Caitríona Nic Philibín	25	Stoneybatter	Box Office Supervisor	Eliminated October 18
Cathy Gerrard	43	Dublin	Information Executive	Eliminated October 18
Danielle "Dani" Quinlan	29	Kildare	Jockey	Eliminated October 18
Deirdre "Dee" Casey	29	Ballinteer	Bank Business Manager	Eliminated October 18

=== Celebrity MasterChef Ireland 2013 ===
On 14 July 2013, Celebrity MasterChef Ireland, a new six-part series began on RTÉ One at 9.30pm. Eight celebrities are taking part with Dylan McGrath and Nick Munier returning as judges.

In week 1 judges Nick Munier and Dylan McGrath asked the contestants to cook something that is 'You on a Plate' and also to cook French dessert Crêpe Suzette in a cooking challenge. Comedian Gary Cooke was the first contestant to leave after Dylan McGrath commented that his dessert looked like something that had "fallen off a roof." David Gillick was crowned the winner of the competition on the final which aired 18 August 2013, beating fellow finalists, Aengus Mac Grianna and Maia Dunphy.

Contestant	Occupation	Finish
David Gillick	Athlete	Winner August 18
Aengus Mac Grianna	RTÉ Newscaster	Runner-Up August 18
Maia Dunphy	Writer	Eliminated August 18
Yvonne Connolly	Former Model	Eliminated August 11
Conor Pope	Irish Times Correspondent	Eliminated August 4
Tracy Piggott	Sports Presenter	Eliminated July 28
Kamal Ibrahim	Presenter	Eliminated July 21
Gary Cooke	Comedian	Eliminated July 14

=== Series 3 (2014) ===
A third season was premiered on 4 March 2014 on RTÉ Two, with two episodes were aired on Tuesday & Wednesday per week. It featured 24 amateur cooks competing for the 'MasterChef Ireland' title. The final of the third season aired on 7 May 2014 and was won by Diana Dodog.

Contestant	Age	Hometown	Occupation	Status
Diana Dodog	35	Courtmacsherry	Waitress	Winner May 7
Edel Byrne	37	Celbridge	Homemaker	Runners-Up May 7
Niamh Mannion	43	Roscommon	Civil Servant	Runners-Up May 7
Hugh Mullan	41	Glenville	IT Design Consultant	Eliminated April 23
Charlie Day	31	Delgany	Market Stall Trader	Eliminated April 16
Mark McGrath	20	Glasnevin	Student	Eliminated April 16
Nessa Collinge	37	Dublin	Part-time Tutor	Eliminated April 9
Nick Watson	30		Financial Analyst	Eliminated April 9
Rich Dales	43		Search Engine Manager	Eliminated April 2
Sonya Hylton	38	Portmarnock	Full-time Mom	Eliminated April 2

=== Celebrity MasterChef Ireland 2017 ===
On 16 January 2017, a new series of Celebrity MasterChef Ireland began on TV3 at 10pm. Daniel Clifford and Robin Gill were the judges.

Contestant	Finish
Niamh Kavanagh	Winner March 6
Oisín McConville	Runners-Up March 6
Simon Delaney	Runners-Up March 6
Colm O'Gorman	Eliminated February 27
Samantha Mumba	Eliminated February 20
Mundy	Eliminated February 13
Evelyn Cusack	Eliminated February 6
Nadia Forde	Eliminated January 30
Sonia O'Sullivan	Eliminated January 23
Holly Carpenter	Eliminated January 16
