= Arthur Leahy (activist) =

Irish pro-LGBTQ activist

- Born: 1945 (age 80–81); Cork city
- Years active: 1970s – present
- Employer: Quay Co-op
- Known for: LGBT activism Feminist activism Palestine activism
- Awards: Spirit of Mother Jones Award (2025)

Arthur Leahy (born 1945) is an Irish activist. Leahy has supported various social movements through his life, especially for LGBTQ rights in the Republic of Ireland. Leahy was Cork's first openly gay man. He was the recipient of the Spirit of Mother Jones Award in 2025.

== Early life ==
Leahy was born in Cork in 1945 and moved to London in the early 1960s, returning to Cork in the late 1970s.

== Quay Co-op ==
Leahy is one of the founders of the Quay Co-op, a vegetarian health food shop, established in 1982 by a group of feminist, lesbian, gay and other social justice activists. Leahy's personal book collection was the basis for the not-for-profit bookshop within the Co-op.

== Activism ==
Leahy would hold the hands of patients dying of HIV/AIDS, whilst medical professionals adorned multiple layers of personal protective equipment.

Leahy played a significant part in legalising Same-sex marriage in the Republic of Ireland. In 1979, Leahy and his partner, Laurie Steele, became the first same-sex couple to be interviewed on national television in Ireland, by broadcaster RTÉ.

Leahy has helped lead protests in favor of Palestine during the Gaza war.
