= Kevin Thornton =

Kevin Thornton may refer to:

- Kevin Thornton (chef), Irish Michelin starred chef
- Kevin Thornton (footballer) (born 1986), Irish footballer
- Kevin Thornton, member of the band Color Me Badd
