= Dan Mullane =

Irish celebrity chef

- Born: Daniel Mullane; County Limerick
- Education: Blackrock College, Dublin; Catering school
- Occupation: Chef
- Employer: Self-employed
- Known for: Guerrilla Gourmet, The Mustard Seed

Daniel Mullane is an Irish celebrity chef, television personality and proprietor of the restaurant, The Mustard Seed in Ballingarry, County Limerick. Himself and his cookery have featured on the RTÉ One television series Guerrilla Gourmet. He has received numerous awards, including Black & White Awards. His cookery has received positive reviews in publications such as the Irish Independent.

== Style ==
Mullane emphasizes "hospitality, generosity and the personal touch". He grows his ingredients in his own vegetable garden. His growings include lemongrass and chillis.

== Early life ==
Mullane is from County Limerick. He attended Blackrock College in Dublin and then catering college after school.

== Career ==
Mullane's restaurant, The Mustard Seed, is located in the Echo Lodge, a Victorian building in Ballingarry, near Adare in County Limerick. Mullane has said he will never open another restaurant.

In February 2008, Mullane featured in the fifth episode of Guerrilla Gourmet, a television series which had six professional chefs attempt to set up their own temporary restaurant in an unusual location. Having boarded in Blackrock College in Dublin, Mullane returned there with his temporary restaurant.

The Mustard Seed has received positive reviews from critics such as The Restaurant's Tom Doorley, Georgina Campbell and a mixed review by Pol O Conghaile of the Irish Independent. O Conghaile's review of the restaurant was published on 14 February 2009. He described his experience at the restaurant as mainly positive; he described the dining area as "moody" and the service as "chirpy". O Conghaile wrote negatively about his duck dish, although his Kenmare cold-smoked salmon starter was "delicious" and the best of its type that he had ever eaten.

== Awards ==
Mullane has received Black & White Awards and received the Best Use of Fresh Ingredients Award from Bord Bia in January 2009.
