= Guerrilla Gourmet =

- Country of origin: Ireland
- Original language: English
- No. of series: 1
- No. of episodes: 6

Original release
- Network: RTÉ One
- Release: 11 February 2008

Guerrilla Gourmet is an Irish television series broadcast on RTÉ One. The series features professional chefs from various backgrounds, such as Dylan McGrath and Kevin Dundon, who each take on a new challenge. Each episode sees a different chef try to construct a temporary "guerrilla restaurant" out of nothing, taking on the task of locating a premises, composing a menu, cooking the food to serve to the customers and finding the actual customers themselves. The six-part series began broadcasting on 11 February 2008 at 20:30. Locations featured include Blackrock College, the Royal Hospital Kilmainham and the Rock of Cashel.

== Episodes ==
The first episode featured Kevin Dundon. He regularly features on The Afternoon Show and both owns and manages Dunbrody Country House Hotel in County Wexford alongside his wife Catherine. Dundon establishes a restaurant in Saint Saviour's Boxing Club in Waterford. Four of the fifty members of the boxing club prepare the food, including pigeon and tomato and poitín soup, in the temporary kitchen.

The second episode features Denis Cotter. He is described as a "vegetarian icon" and "hero to non-meat eaters", beginning his career as a banker before quitting to form his own restaurant business. In 1993 he opened his award-winning Café Paradiso restaurant in Cork. Cotter's challenge sees him construct a "Gary Larson-esque world where he turns reality inside out" – he establishes a vegetarian restaurant in Bandon Mart to attract local beef farmers to try his vegetarian options. Cotter also has a fear of cattle.

The third episode features Kevin Thornton. He is described as a "gastronomic legend" in Ireland. He has a Michelin star restaurant and is also fond of photography and scuba diving. His family includes one wife, two sons and two grandchildren. Thornton chooses to house his temporary restaurant at the Rock of Cashel in County Tipperary, having grown up in the area as a child. He cooks rabbit, scallops and sea urchins for twenty-eight people without the use of electricity.

The fourth episode features Anita Thoma. She has spent much of her adult life engaged in the process of cooking, but only recently set up her own business in Dublin, Il Primo. Her father emigrated to Ireland from Switzerland in the 1940s. She is described as being in possession of a Mediterranean menu and "personally sourced" Tuscan wines. She blends food with performance so takes her temporary restaurant to Fossett's Circus.

The fifth episode features Dan Mullane. He is from County Limerick. He owns The Mustard Seed restaurant and grows his ingredients in his own vegetable garden. He attended catering college after school and emphasisies "hospitality, generosity and the personal touch". He says he will never open another restaurant. Having boarded in Blackrock College in Dublin, Mullane returns there with his temporary restaurant.

The sixth and final episode features Dylan McGrath. He owns Mint in Ranelagh, Dublin. He was brought up in West Belfast before attending catering college. His cooking style is that of an artist and he is known to serve his food in darkness so that his guests can "hone their taste buds". McGrath chooses a dark room in the Royal Hospital Kilmainham in Dublin as his temporary restaurant venue. One week after filming he received his first Michelin star and achieved further fame when he was involved in a fight with fellow chef, Kevin Dundon, on the live television chat show Tubridy Tonight.
