= Guillaume Lebrun =

French head chef

- Born: rural France
- Occupations: Executive head chef and part owner of Restaurant Patrick Guilbaud
- Employer: Patrick Guilbaud
- Known for: Michelin star
- Spouse: Anne Lebrun
- Children: Ciaran, Andree, and Denis

Guillaume Lebrun is a French head chef in the Michelin-starred Restaurant Patrick Guilbaud in Dublin, Ireland.

He was born in rural France, as son of a baker. He wanted to do something with food later in life but taking over the bakery was impossible due to an allergy to flour so he started training to become chef. He learned and worked his way up to a two-star restaurant in Paris. Then he got his lucky break and came in contact with Patrick Guilbaud, who at that time was looking for a chef for his new restaurant in Ireland.

In 1981, Lebrun arrived in Dublin to work in Restaurant Patrick Guilbaud. He had a difficult start there, but Guilbaud prevented him from leaving. Reluctantly he stayed, and went on to earn Irelands first 2 Michelin stars.

Lebrun's signature dishes include Lobster Ravioli, Roast Challans Duck for two and Assiette Gourmande au Chocolat.

== Personal ==
Lebrun is not a celebrity chef like many other Michelin-starred chefs. He believes that chefs should be invisible. His hobbies are clay pigeon shooting, fishing, and paintings. Lebrun is married to an Irish woman and has three bilingual children; Andree, Ciaran, and Denis.

== Awards ==
- One Michelin star: 1989-1995
- Two Michelin stars: 1996–present
