= Celebrity Head Chef =

- Starring: Conrad Gallagher; Wagner Carrilho; Mary Burke; Michael Hayes; Geraldine O'Callaghan; Kohlin Harris; Adele King
- Country of origin: Ireland
- No. of episodes: 5

Production
- Producer: Sideline Productions
- Running time: 60 minutes

Original release
- Network: TV3
- Release: 25 July – 29 July 2011

Related
- Head Chef (2011–present); Junior Head Chef

Celebrity Head Chef is the second series of TV3's cookery series, Head Chef. The series features Conrad Gallagher, the youngest chef ever to win a Michelin Star and stars Wagner Fiuza-Carrilho from The X Factor; Mary Burke, the mammy from Crystal Swing; Adele King (Twink); Geraldine from The Apprentice; Michael Hayes, the presenter from How Low Can You Go?; and former model Kohlin Harris.

== Contestants ==
As there are no eliminations in the show, the series will begin and end with 6 contestants. At the conclusion of the final episode, Conrad will choose the winner.

=== Wagner Carrilho ===
Wagner Carrilho was an X Factor contestant known for his charismatic performances and his unique personality. After being rejected in the audition round, Wagner was called back into the competition as Louis Walsh's Wild card. He was eliminated in the eighth week of X Factor after performing in the final showdown with Irish singer Mary Byrne.

=== Mary Burke ===
Mary Burke is the mother and keyboardist of the popular family singing group, Crystal Swing. The group has appeared on The Late Late on RTÉ and The Ellen DeGeneres Show in America.

=== Michael Hayes ===
Michael Hayes was the presenter from How Low Can You Go? on RTÉ Two. He is also the presenter of Animal A & E on TV3.

=== Geraldine O'Callaghan ===
Geraldine O’Callaghan was a semi-finalist on The Apprentice on TV3.She was eliminated in the 12th week of the Apprentice competition.

=== Kohlin Harris ===
Kohlin Harris was Ireland's first male supermodel, modelling for Calvin Klein and Versace who was scouted in Dublin aged 16.

=== Adele King ===
Adele King is an entertainer better known as Twink formerly of a group called Maxi, Dick and Twink. She has also been described as Ireland's panto queen. She is also respected in the sugar craft world.
