= Glovers Alley =

Michelin-starred restaurant in Dublin

Restaurant information
- Rating: Michelin Guide
- Location: 128 St Stephen's Green, Dublin, D02 HE18, Ireland

Glovers Alley is a Michelin-starred restaurant in Dublin. The restaurant is in the Fitzwilliam Hotel. The space was previously occupied by Thornton's Restaurant.

== See also ==
- List of Michelin starred restaurants in Ireland
