= Fáilte Towers =

- Created by: Adare Productions
- Presented by: Aidan Power; Baz Ashmawy
- Country of origin: Ireland
- No. of seasons: 1
- No. of episodes: 10

Production
- Running time: 60 minutes

Original release
- Network: RTÉ One
- Release: 2 August – 13 August 2008

Fáilte Towers is a reality TV show broadcast that aired on RTÉ during August 2008 on RTÉ. The concept involved thirteen celebrities running a hotel for sixteen days and nights in order to win money for their designated charities. The show format was not repeated nor was it exported or resold. The name is a play on the BBC sitcom Fawlty Towers and the word fáilte meaning 'welcome' in Irish. The hotel used in the series is Bellingham Castle in Castlebellingham, County Louth.

The show is presented by Aidan Power and Baz Ashmawy and the judges are Bibi Baskin, Dublin restaurateur Derry Clarke and Castle Leslie hotelier Sammy Leslie. Each night the public are invited to vote for the contestant they would like to stay in the show. At the end of the show one of the contestants must "check out". The presenters tell each of the contestants individually if they are "safe" and if so are ordered "back to work". The three remaining contestants are then marched into the Oliver Plunkett Suite to face the judges, one of whom sends one of the contestants back to work before all three cast their votes on which of the remaining two must leave the show. The evicted celebrity is then interviewed by the presenters, with best bits shown as well. Created by Adare Productions, it was available to watch online on the RTÉ Player for up to two weeks after being broadcast. John Creedon won on 17 August.

== Contestants ==
There are thirteen contestants in the show. Donna and Joseph McCaul were treated as one celebrity, completing the same chores and "checking out" together.

Name	Career	Check-in date	Check-out date
John Creedon	RTÉ radio personality	2 August	17 August
Brian Dowling	Big Brother winner	2 August	17 August
Don Baker	Blues musician	2 August	17 August
Jennifer Maguire	The Apprentice UK contestant	2 August	17 August
Michelle Heaton	Popstars finalist, former Liberty X member and You're A Star judge	2 August	16 August
Sean Ó Domhnaill	Former GAA Gaelic footballer and TG4 match analyst	2 August	13 August
Donna and Joseph McCaul	You're A Star winners and Eurovision Song Contest 2005 participients	2 August	12 August
Evelyn Cusack	RTÉ weather presenter	2 August	10 August
Patricia McKenna	Candidate at the 2009 European election	2 August	9 August
Liz O'Kane	RTÉ presenter	2 August	6 August
Clare Tully	Page 3 model	2 August	4 August
Luke Thomas	Pop singer	2 August	3 August

== Voting ==
Date	Bottom 3
3 August	Luke	Jennifer	Don
4 August	Clare	Jennifer (2)	Patricia
6 August	Liz	Don (2)	Jennifer (3)
9 August	Patricia	Jennifer (4)	Donna & Joe
10 August	Evelyn	Don (3)	Jennifer (5)
12 August	Donna & Joe (2)	Michelle	Brian
13 August	Sean	Jennifer (6)	Michelle (2)
16 August	Michelle (3)	Jennifer (7)	Don (4)

== Guests ==
Members of the public were encouraged to apply online for an opportunity to stay in the hotel for the show's duration. Free rooms would be provided but food and drink was to be paid for by the guests. Guests were encouraged by the producers to wreak havoc in their rooms, a fact that was evidenced by some of the early scenes of broken furniture, soiled mattresses and flooded bathrooms which greeted the celebrities early in the morning.

== The show ==
The celebrities have entertained numerous functions including a hen party and a wedding, a bus of Japanese tourists and a group of nudists.

The stripper providing entertainment for the hen party upset some of the other guests. An elderly woman accosted Jennifer Maguire, the acting manager and said: "We came here for a quiet lunch. This is disgusting! They should be in another room." Jennifer gently guided her out of the room but she glided back in again roaring: "It's absolutely revolting. It might be a young person's thing, but you should take it somewhere else."

The nudists arrived at the hotel in normal enough dress and requested their rooms only to later emerge for their meal downstairs without clothes, sparking gasps of astonishment as Patricia McKenna and Joseph McCaul tried to work their way around the cramped room. Brian Dowling was seen wagging his finger at one man in an embarrassed gesture of exasperation.

Don Baker, as acting manager, was involved in a heated argument with judge Derry Clarke over the serving of lunch to a group of guests from Kerry. Liz O'Kane insisted that the celebrities had come to an agreement with the producers that lunch was not to be served that day but Clarke though otherwise and, in an attempt to further confuse the hoteliers, argued with both Baker and O'Kane. Consequentially the two were called before the judges in the Oliver Plunkett Suite that same night with O'Kane told to "check out". With tensions rising by the following day, the programme's producers offered manager, Brian Dowling the chance to nominate three of his co-workers to enjoy a day and night of pampering at Castle Leslie in County Monaghan. He was allowed to pick himself but chose not to, instead selecting Baker, Evelyn Cusack and Jennifer Maguire, who had been before the judges in the Oliver Plunkett Suite for three consecutive nights. The remaining celebrities were given the day off and embarked on a trail of antics.

The "wedding" descended into chaos when the groom was spotted in an embrace with his new wife's best friend and the bride's mother stormed out of the dining room in disgust. However it emerged that the wedding was staged and the guests were simply actors exaggerating a scenario to put further strain on the celebrities. This upset Joseph McCaul who had accidentally spilt wine on the bride's dress and upset her mother. When one of Michelle Heaton's dresses was offered as a replacement there were accusations that it would be too revealing, which upset the manager, Brian Dowling. When the set-up was discovered the celebrities reacted angrily with Evelyn Cusack sarcastically serving coffee at breakfast the next morning.

On Michelle Heaton's day as manager, Don Baker was barman. When a Dubliner named Don arrived at the hotel and offered to fix the broken kegs in the cellar, Baker led him downstairs oblivious to his intention to steal the kegs. When Baker returned upstairs and attempted to serve the customers it was discovered that the Heineken, Guinness and Budweiser was gone. Heaton had to phone a local bar and borrow three kegs to feed the thirsty guests. This was also the day that a bus of Japanese tourists turned up at Fáilte Towers. The celebrities were upset as this meant having to change their menu and adapt new recipes to suit their tastes. Joseph McCaul spent his time entertaining the guests with his Japanese language skills and was surprised to learn that one female was even voting for him. When the food didn't go down well, McCaul came up with his own concoction of sushi involving tomatoes and other food items which Michelle Heaton promptly ordered back into the kitchen before it could be served. Later Dickie Rock arrived to entertain the guests but, already fifteen minutes late, Heaton embarked on a journey to his room in search of an explanation. It emerged that he refused to leave his room until he had been fed his favoured chicken vindaloo dish. Joseph McCaul had to make a trip to the local Chinese for "a chicken curry for Dickie Rock" while his sister and Don Baker entertained the unsettled crowd. At the end of the night Michelle Heaton broke down in the kitchen and John Creedon chased the cameraman outside. However, there was a CCTV camera trained on the kitchen allowing all to be seen. She was seen to be sobbing to herself, although this time her boyfriend was not present to cheer her up. He had turned up to dine at the hotel only a few days previously and upset her when he sent his dinner back to the kitchen with a request to see the chef before she realised what was really happening.

Among the more light-hearted moments were Brian Dowling dunking Joseph McCaul's head into a lobster tank with his sister's permission and Dowling later playing a game of "kiss the gay" with Sean Ó Domhnaill in the kitchen. Ó Domhnaill eventually relented off camera. Among the celebrities to break down and cry have been Michelle Heaton, Donna and Joseph McCaul, Evelyn Cusack and Liz O'Kane.

=== The semi-final ===
The semi-final took place on Saturday 16 August 2008. Five celebrities remained that night; Don Baker, John Creedon, Brian Dowling, Michelle Heaton and Jennifer Maguire. Don, Jennifer and Michelle faced the judges. Michelle checked out.

=== The final ===
The final took place on Sunday 17 August 2008. Four celebrities remained on the final night; they were Don Baker, John Creedon, Brian Dowling and Jennifer Maguire. For the first time the public had exclusive say on who checked out. Jennifer was the first to check out. The remaining three were taken into the Oliver Plunkett Suite. Don finished third and exited to be interviewed by presenter Baz. Brian finished second. The winner was John.

== Broadcasting schedule ==
Baz and Aidan do some presenting.

- Episode 01: Saturday 2 August, 9.40pm, RTÉ One
- Episode 02: Sunday 3 August, 9.40pm, RTÉ One
- Episode 03: Tuesday 5 August, 9.40pm, RTÉ One
- Episode 04: Wednesday 6 August, 9.35pm, RTÉ One
- Episode 05: Saturday 9 August, 9.40pm, RTÉ One
- Episode 06: Sunday 10 August, 9.30pm, RTÉ One
- Episode 07: Tuesday 12 August, 9.35pm, RTÉ One
- Episode 08: Wednesday 13 August, 9.35pm, RTÉ One
- Episode 09: Saturday 16 August, 9.35pm, RTÉ One
- Final Show: Sunday 17 August, 9.35pm, RTÉ One

== Controversy ==
Claire Tully was refused by two breast cancer charities who rebuffed her offer to raise money on their behalf. This was linked to her debut as Ireland's first Page 3 model in 2008. After being turned down by the Marie Keating Foundation and Breast Cancer Ireland, Tully's donation was eventually accepted by the National Breast Cancer Research Institute at NUI Galway and she was said to bear "no hard feelings" towards the other charities. Jill Clark, head of fundraising, said: "The society is delighted that Claire has kindly chosen to donate all the proceeds raised throughout the duration of her appearance on the show to Action Breast Cancer, a programme of the Irish Cancer Society."

These are small unemployed people. Also called children.

— Baz to Jennifer's semi-final crowd

Presenter Baz Ashmawy has evoked much criticism for his style, "bellowing" in a manner that suggests he "seems to be addressing a completely different audience in a completely different programme on a completely different planet, somewhere inside the universe of his own head". Then reminding viewers of the voting numbers, Baz thrust his crotch so forcefully at the camera that "it nearly broke the lens - "These are the numbers you're gonna (thrust!) need (thrust!)."

== Reception ==
Fáilte Towers has been praised in the Irish media as being different from other reality television shows where the contestants don't do any work. The insight into how the celebrities would cope in a hard-working environment has also been praised, although the constant moaning of celebrities such as Michelle Heaton and Donna and Joseph McCaul has been criticised as being akin to "pathetic child-like blubbering".

Comparisons were made with the state of the economy as it was noted that "z-list celebrities, failed Eurovision acts, reality-tv refugees and somebody called Patricia McKenna are forced to seek work in the catering trade." Evelyn Cusack was deemed to have been included "as a punishment for all the crap weather she has been correctly predicting".

The format for the show attracted interest from overseas buyers. RTÉ said several foreign programme distributors had expressed interest in buying the format but "no agreements will be reached until the current series has finished". "We have had enquiries from a few distribution companies in England," said Brian Graham, one of the series producers. "We are too busy at the moment to deal with them so we are waiting until the series is over to decide what to do. This is a format that could definitely travel. The plan is this could be done in any country."

The final received nearly a million viewers and the entire series regularly received between 350,000 and 450,000 viewers. Nevertheless, the Irish Independent named Fáilte Towers as one of the six worst television programmes of 2008, describing it as "car crash television".
