= Don Baker (musician) =

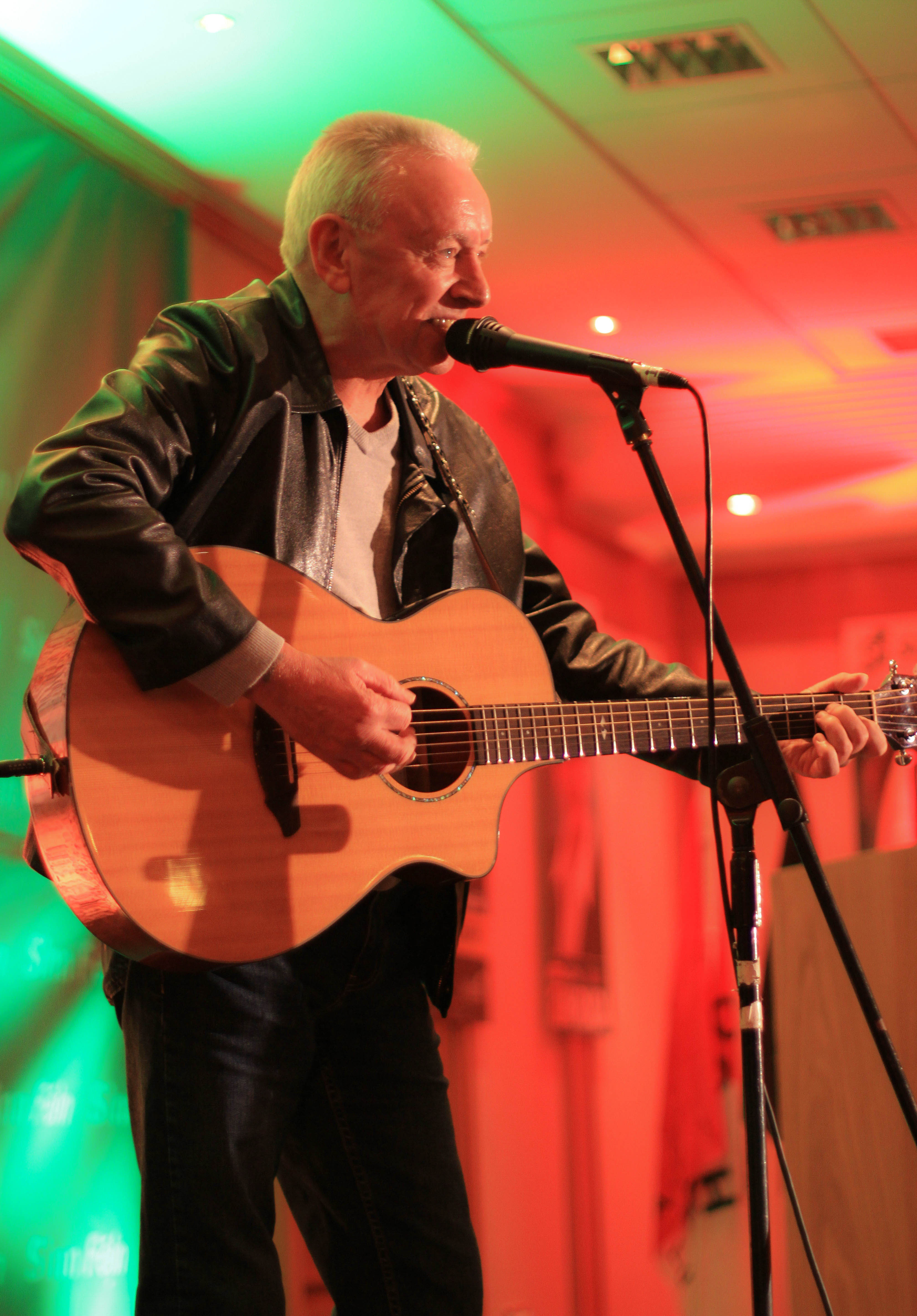
- Baker in 2014

Background information
- Born: Don Baker; 26 August 1950 (age 75)
- Origin: Whitehall, Dublin, Ireland
- Genres: Rock, Blues
- Occupations: Musician, singer, songwriter, actor
- Years active: 1960–present (musician); 1991–present (actor)
- Website: www.donbaker.ie

Don Baker (born 26 August 1950) is an Irish blues musician, television personality, and actor.

Baker was born in Whitehall, Dublin. He is a singer-songwriter who plays the harmonica and the guitar. He appeared in several films, his most notable appearance being in In the Name of the Father and On the Nose. He has published harmonica instruction books and videos.

In August 2008, he appeared in RTÉ's reality show Fáilte Towers, finishing in third place, earning money for his charity Health Action Overseas.

== Discography ==
- Almost Illegal (1989)
- Born With The Blues (1990)
- No Nonsense (1993)
- Four For The Road with Jimmy MacCarthy, Mick Hanly and Finbar Furey, Live on Tour 1994 (1994)
- No Regrets (1996)
- Just Don Baker (1998)
- Miss You (2000)
- Duckin' & Divin' - 2 CDs (2003)
- Rain On The Wind (2006)
- My Songs My Friends (2013)
- Bakerrose - Don Baker & Clara Rose (2016)
- A Day In Jealoustown - Don Baker & Rob Strong (2018)
- Brothers In Blues - Don Baker & Rob Strong (2018)
- The Blues Man - 2 CDs (2019)

== Bibliography ==
- The Harmonica (1987)
- Complete Harmonica Techniques (1993)
- Beginning Blues Harp (1995)
- Beginning Rock Harp (1996)
- The Winner in Me: Don Baker's Story (1999)
- Learn to Play Blues Harmonica (2011)
- Soodlum's Harmonica Pack
- Famous Harmonica Styles (video tape)
