= Denis Cotter =

Irish chef and restaurateur

- Born: Macroom, County Cork, Ireland
- Occupations: Chef, author
- Known for: Vegetarian cooking, cookery books, Guerrilla Gourmet, Café Paradiso

Denis Cotter is an Irish celebrity chef from Macroom, author and proprietor of the acclaimed vegetarian Paradiso restaurant in Cork City. He has also published several cookbooks and featured on the RTÉ One television series Guerrilla Gourmet.

== Style ==
Cotter is described as a "vegetarian icon" and "hero to non-meat eaters". His meals include goat's cheese gnocchi with pan-fried artichokes. In Café Paradiso, his Cork city restaurant, Cotter has evolved an 'innovative' style of vegetarian cooking, based on local produce and cheeses, and on a close working relationship with Gortnanain Farm just outside the city.

== Career ==
Cotter began his career working at a bank in the internal audit department for 8 years. He left the bank in the 1980s and took a job at Cranks in London waiting tables and working in the kitchen. He then spent four years working at the Quay Co-Op vegetarian restaurant in Cork.

=== Paradiso ===
Cotter opened his award-winning Café Paradiso restaurant in Cork in 1993. In 2016, the restaurant name was changed from Café Paradiso to Paradiso. In 2019, the restaurant won the Collaboration of the Year for its partnership with Gort na Nain Farm at the World Restaurant Awards in Paris. In 2005, Kate Burt of The Guardian said the restaurant had "sexy dishes". In 2022, a review in The Times said "Paradiso is exciting and inventive with vegetarian food." In 2023, a review in The Irish Times said the restaurant "feels like a world in which meat never existed."

=== Teaching ===
Cotter is also a cookery teacher, and has taught at schools in Ireland such as The Tannery in Dungarvan, County Waterford, Ballymaloe Cookery School in County Cork and Donnybrook Fair in Dublin, as well as stints in the Stratford Chefs School and Jill's Table in Ontario, Canada.

=== Guerrilla Gourmet ===
In February 2008, Cotter featured in the third episode of Guerrilla Gourmet, a television series which had six professional chefs attempt to set up their own temporary restaurant in an unusual location. Cotter's challenge saw him construct a "Gary Larson-esque world where he turns reality inside out" – he established a vegetarian restaurant in the sale yard of Bandon Mart to attract local beef farmers to try his vegetarian options. Cotter's challenge was all the more trying for him because he possesses a fear of cattle.

== Awards ==
Cotter was named "Chef of the Year" by the Irish magazine 'Food & Wine' in 2005, and "Best Chef in Cork" by the Restaurants Association of Ireland in 2009. As of 2011, Café Paradiso was listed in the "Bridgestone 100 Best Places to Eat in Ireland" guidebook. It was voted "Best Restaurant in Munster" by the readers of 'Food & Wine' magazine in 2001, and the restaurant was also voted "Restaurant of the Year" by Les Routiers Ireland in 2004.

On 7 March 2009, the Irish Independent listed Cotter, alongside Neven Maguire of the MacNean Restaurant, Brian McCann of Shu and Martin Shanahan of Fishy Fishy Cafe, as a chef whom many would be surprised to learn has no Michelin stars to his name and never has had. At the time, there were only six restaurants in possession of this accolade and all of them were in Dublin.

== Published works ==
Cotter published his first cookbook, The Cafe Paradiso Cookbook, in 1999, followed in 2003 by Paradiso Seasons, which was named as best vegetarian cookbook in the world at the Gourmand World Cookbook Fair in 2003. The cookbook, Cafe Paradiso, was nominated for a James Beard Foundation Award (Vegetarian) in 2005. In 2007, his third book, 'wild garlic, gooseberries...and me", was published by HarperCollins and shortlisted for the Andre Simon awards.

Other works include:

- The Cafe Paradiso Cookbook, 1999, Atrium Press, ISBN 978-0953535309
- Paradiso Seasons, 2003, Gardners Books, ISBN 978-0953535347
- A Paradiso Year: Spring and Summer Cooking, 2006, Attic Press Ltd., ISBN 978-0953535361
- A Paradiso Year: Autumn and Winter Cooking, 2006, Attic Press Ltd., ISBN 978-0953535378
- Wild Garlic, Gooseberries and Me: A chef’s stories and recipes from the land, 2007, HarperCollins UK, ISBN 978-0007251971
- For The Love of Food: Vegetarian Recipes from the Heart, 2011, Collins, ISBN 978-0007312757
- Paradiso: Recipes and Reflections, 2023, Nine Bean Rows, ISBN 978-1739210502

== See also ==
- List of chefs
- Irish cuisine
