= The Mustard Seed (restaurant) =

Restaurant in Ballingarry, County Limerick, Ireland

Coordinates: 52.4755°N 8.8668°W

The Mustard Seed is an Irish restaurant located in Ballingarry, County Limerick. It specialises in growing its own ingredients and the proprietor of this restaurant is the celebrity chef and television personality Dan Mullane.

In 2016, ownership of The Mustard Seed changed hands from Dan to his manager of 25 years, John Edward Joyce.

It has been featured in publications such as the Irish Independent and Examiner.com and has been praised by critics such as Tom Doorley of the RTÉ One television series The Restaurant, Georgina Campbell and been given a mixed review by Pol O Conghaile of the Irish Independent.

== Location ==
The Mustard Seed, is located in the Echo Lodge, a Victorian building in Ballingarry, near Adare in County Limerick. It maintains a set price of four courses costing a total of €63. Mullane has claimed he will never expand his business by opening another restaurant alongside The Mustard Seed. Foods such as fruit, herbs and vegetables are grown by Mullane to serve in the restaurant.

== Reviews ==
The Mustard Seed has received positive reviews from critics such as The Restaurant's Tom Doorley, Georgina Campbell and a mixed review by Pol O Conghaile of the Irish Independent. O Conghaile visited the restaurant before submitting his report for it to be published on 14 February 2009. O Conghaile was on a tour of the region surrounding south-west County Offaly, County Tipperary, County Clare and Limerick itself, overlooking more well-known tourist destinations such as the Cliffs of Moher and Bunratty Castle in his attempts to locate what he described as "Shannon's hidden gems". He described his experience at the restaurant as mainly positive; indeed he described the dining area as "moody" and the service as "chirpy". O Conghaile's problems were with the food; although Kenmare cold-smoked salmon starter was "delicious" and the best of its type that he had ever dined upon, his main course of duck was "fatty enough to require a knife change" and the bacon breakfast he had the following day was "rock-hard".

== Awards ==
Dan Mullane and The Mustard Seed restaurant have received numerous awards for their work. These have included Black & White Awards but there has been no Michelin stars. Mullane received the Best Use of Fresh Ingredients Award from Bord Bia in January 2009.
