= Peacock Alley (restaurant) =

Coordinates: 53°20′21.03″N 6°15′41.33″W

- Interactive map of Peacock Alley

Restaurant information
- Established: 1999
- Head chef: Conrad Gallagher
- Food type: French
- Rating: Michelin Guide
- Location: 128 St. Stephen’s Green, Dublin, Ireland
- Seating capacity: 60

Peacock Alley was a restaurant housed in the Fitzwilliam Hotel at St. Stephen’s Green, Dublin, County Dublin, Ireland from 1999 to 2002. Before that, its location was on Baggot Street in South William Street.

It was a fine dining restaurant that was awarded one Michelin star in 1998 and retained that rating until it closed in 2002.

The head chef of Peacock Alley was Conrad Gallagher.

Kevin Thornton bought the Peacock Alley in 2002, after the Fitzwilliam Hotel had cancelled the lease with Gallagher. He renamed the restaurant Thornton's Restaurant.

== See also ==
- List of Michelin starred restaurants in Ireland
