= Sauce vierge =

French sauce

- Type: Sauce
- Place of origin: France
- Main ingredients: Tomatoes, olive oil, lemon juice, basil

Sauce vierge (French pronunciation: [sos vjɛʁʒ]; in English: literally, "virgin sauce") is a French sauce made from olive oil, lemon juice, chopped tomato and chopped basil.

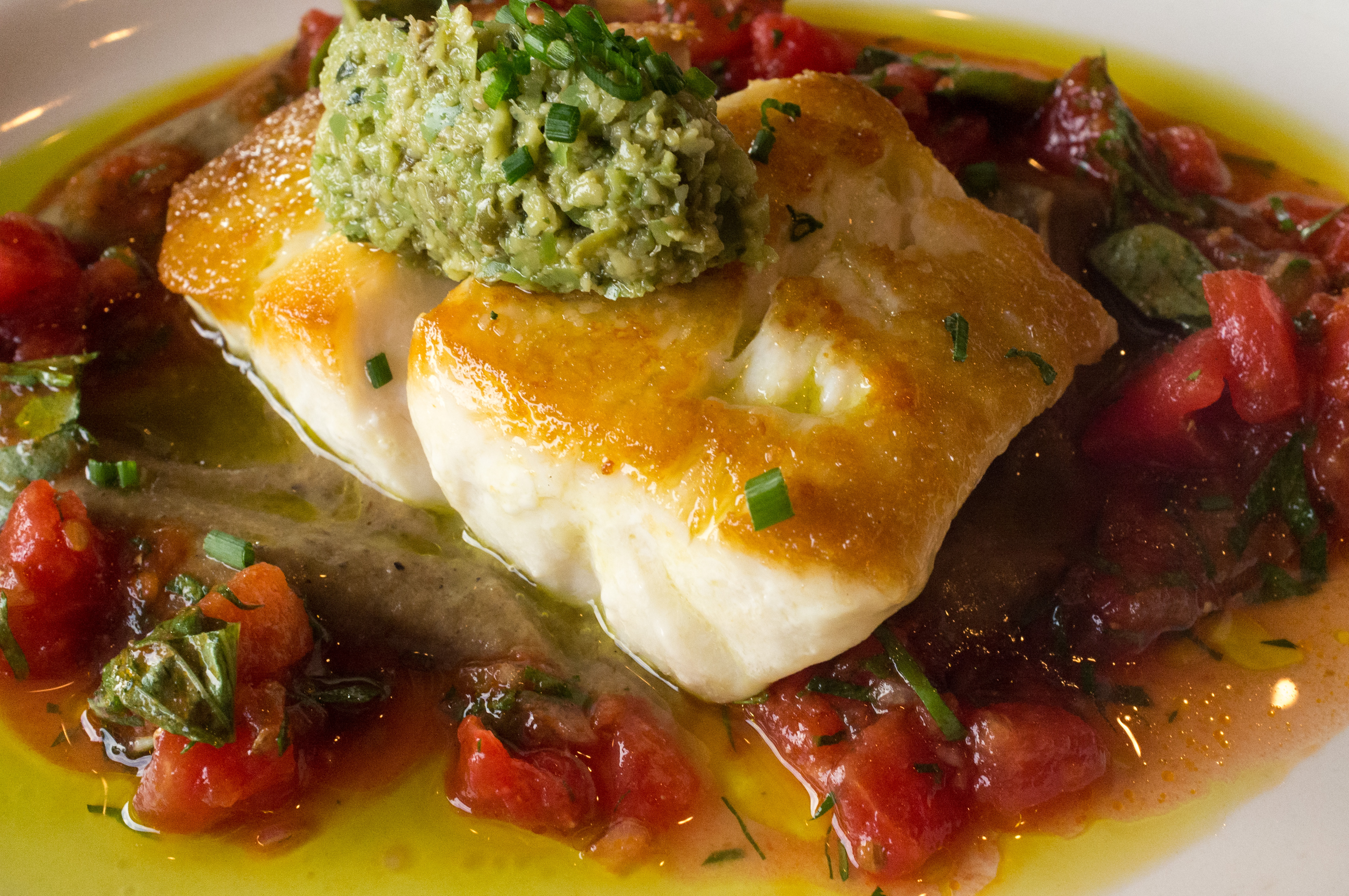
Gulf Red Snapper with sauce vierge

Frequently, crushed coriander seed is added and variations may include the addition of other herbs such as chervil, chives and parsley. The ingredients are combined and allowed to infuse or macerate (depending on whether heat is applied or not) in the oil to create the sauce.

The sauce is usually served with shellfish and delicately flavoured white-fleshed fish such as cod and sole. It is sometimes served over pasta.

The sauce was popularised in the 1980s by Michel Guérard, a French chef, author, one of the founders of nouvelle cuisine and the inventor of cuisine minceur, from Eugénie-les-Bains, Aquitaine, in south-western France, and has since become a modern classic.

In its original form the sauce was intended as a Mediterranean preparation and contained a lot of garlic. It was served either hot or cold after the herbs had been infused in the oil.
