= Alice Leahy =

Irish activist)

- Born: 1942 (age 83–84); Fethard, County Tipperary
- Occupations: Social activist, lecturer, writer
- Organization: Alice Leahy Trust
- Title: Director of Services, Alice Leahy Trust

Alice Leahy is a social activist and writer from Fethard, County Tipperary. She is the founder and Director of Services of the Alice Leahy Trust (formerly known as TRUST), an organisation providing supportive services for people who are homeless. A former nurse-midwife, she was appointed to the Irish Human Rights Commission in 2006, was a Chairperson of the Sentence Review Commission, has lectured and has written several books.

== Life and career ==
=== Nursing ===
Alice Leahy, from Fethard in County Tipperary, trained as a nurse at the Royal City of Dublin Hospital at Baggot Street. She then trained and worked in midwifery in the Rotunda Hospital in Dublin and also worked for a time at the Kreiskrankenhaus Marienhöhe near Aachen.

=== Homeless services ===
In 1973, Alice Leahy began working with the Simon Community at Sarsfield Quay in Dublin, in Ireland. She took on the role of Assistant National Director (or Co-ordinator) of Simon Ireland (the Irish branch of the Simon Community) and worked in the organization's National Office. During her time with Simon, she researched and wrote a report entitled Medical care for the vagrant in Ireland, 1974: a Simon Ireland report, highlighting the lack of medical care available to homeless people and people living in hostels in Ireland. The Eastern Health Board of Ireland took on board the recommendations of the report. In 1975, this Board employed Alice Leahy to develop a medical service to meet the needs of homeless people. A number of volunteers from the Simon Community worked with Alice on this project.

=== TRUST ===
In 1975, money was made available by Anne Rushe, a long-time volunteer with the Simon Community, to develop a service for homeless people. Alice Leahy, Dave Magee, Bob Cashman, Dermot McMahon, Justin O’Brien, John Long, Owen Mulholland and Anne Rushe founded a new non-governmental organization called TRUST (Charity No. CHY7014), with the stated purpose to serve homeless people in need by promoting human services to meet their immediate and longterm needs and thereby to encourage their development and bring a rightful dignity to their lives. The TRUST team included a public health nurse, a doctor and a social worker.

The name of the organisation was changed to the Alice Leahy Trust in 2016. This organisation provides frontline services to people who are experiencing homelessness or are in precarious housing situations, including medical and social assistance, respite, advice, shower facilities, clothing, friendship and social help. The trust operates from the Iveagh Hostel (run by the Iveagh Trust), in the Liberties of Dublin. The organisation operates from charitable donations and does not receive State funding.

=== Social activism ===
Alice Leahy has been active in many related aspects of social activism and justice in Ireland, in addition to the work with the Alice Leahy Trust. She was a member of the Lord Mayors Commission on Crime in 1993. In 1996 she was appointed a member of the Sentence Review Group. In 1998, Alice Leahy was a member of the Irish National Crime Forum. In 2006, she was appointed a Member of the Irish Human Rights Commission. She was a member of the IHRC Racism, Trafficking and Migration Committee and the Gender, Economic, Social, Cultural Rights and Disability Committee. In 2007, she represented the IHRC on the National Action Plan against Racism (NAPAR) Submission to An Garda Siochana: Diversity Strategy Public Consultation. She was appointed a Member of the Board of Oberstown Children's Detention Campus in 2010.

In 2009, the Irish Minister for the Environment, Heritage and Local Government John Gormley met with Alice Leahy and subsequently arranged for a cold weather homeless shelter to be set up in Dublin, after Alice Leahy campaigned for services to be extended during a very cold winter. This shelter was run by Simon Community staff.

== Honours ==
Alice Leahy has been awarded many honours for her work, a number of which are listed below:

=== Academic Honours ===
- 1999 Honorary Fellow of Faculty of Nursing and Midwifery, RCSI University of Medicine and Health Sciences
- 2004 Honorary Doctorate of Laws, University College Dublin

=== Other Honours ===
- 1988 Rehab People of the year award List of Rehab People of the Year Award winners
- 2003 Tipperary Person of the Year
- 2009: Crystal Clear MSD Health Literacy Award
- 2018: Irish Red Cross Humanitarian Awards. Humanitarian of the Year
- 2018: International Human Rights and Nursing Awards, International Care Ethics Observatory, at the Catherine McAuley school of nursing and midwifery, University College Cork.
- 2026 Tipperary Association Dublin Hall of Fame for 2025

== Publications ==
- Leahy, Alice; Clifford, Mick; Condron, Mark (2025). Outsiders – 50 years of the Alice Leahy Trust. Dublin: The Alice Leahy Trust.
- Leahy, Alice; Cleary, Catherine (2018). The Stars are our only warmth: a memoir. Dublin: The O’Brien Press. ISBN 978-1-78849-025-2.
- Leahy, Alice (2003). With trust in place : writing from the outside. Dublin: Town House. ISBN 1-860591-89-2.
- Leahy, Alice; Dempsey, Anne (1995). Not just a bed for the night: the story of Trust. Dublin: Marino Books. ISBN 1-860230-24-5.
- Leahy, Alice (2008). Wasting time with people?. Dublin: Gill and MacMillan. ISBN 9780717144808.
- Leahy, Alice; Simon Ireland (1974). Medical care for the vagrant in Ireland, 1974: a Simon Ireland report (Report). Ireland: Simon Ireland.
- Leahy, Alice; Trust (1976). Report on Broad Medical Services for the Single Homeless Person (Report). Ireland: Trust.
- Leahy, Alice (Presenter); Tynan Ronan (Producer); Daly, Anne (Producer); TRUST (2005). Building Trust in the community ; and, A fragile city : make a difference by helping everyone feel wanted (DVD). Ireland: Experanza Productions.
