= Dunbrody Country House Hotel =

Hotel in County Wexford, Ireland

Coordinates: 52.24°N 6.942°W

- Interactive map of the Dunbrody Country House Hotel area

General information
- Type: Hotel; restaurant
- Architectural style: Georgian
- Location: County Wexford, Ireland
- Owner: Kevin Dundon

Website
- www.dunbrodyhouse.com

Dunbrody Country House Hotel (also referred to as Dunbrody Country House Hotel and Restaurant) is an Irish Georgian manor-turned-restaurant in County Wexford, owned by Irish chef Kevin Dundon and his wife Catherine. It is located near the village of Arthurstown.

== History ==
Formerly associated with the Marquess of Donegall, Dunbrody House was built in the early 19th century. The house was sold in the mid-1990s and renovated between 1999 and 2001. Dunbrody Country House Hotel was opened by 2001.

== Media coverage ==
An October 2001 review in The Sunday Business Post described Dunbrody Country House Hotel and Restaurant as a building which is "beautifully proportioned" and similar in style to that of Queen Anne. In the same article, Ross Golden Bannon gave a negative review of his and his compatriots' "depressing" experience at Dunbrody Country House Hotel and Restaurant. He bemoaned the fact that himself and his accomplices had to pour their own wine, implying that a restaurant of this calibre ought to employ wine pourers, and complained that the food was overcooked and too salty.

Dunbrody Country House Hotel and Restaurant has also been covered in the Italian media.

== Awards ==
Dunbrody County House Hotel and Restaurant has won the Bushmills Guide Restaurant of the Year 2004, the Jameson Guide Breakfast of the Year 2004 and three RAC Dining Awards. It has been awarded Restaurant of the Year three times, in 2004, 2005 and 2006.
