= Noel V. Ginnity =

Irish stand-up comedian

- Born: Kells, County Meath
- Children: 2, including Odhran Ginnity

Comedy career
- Years active: 1957–
- Genres: Vaudeville, stand-up

Noel V. Ginnity is an Irish stand-up comedian and former hairdresser. He has been described as Ireland's last vaudeville star. As a cabaret performer, he has long been associated with Taylor's pub in Three Rock Mountain in south county Dublin.

As a comedy writer his material has been used by comedians such as Brendan Grace.

Ginnity was the victim of a tiger kidnapping in 1994.

He has two children, including son, tech entrepreneur Odhran Ginnity.
