= Evelyn Cusack =

Irish weather presenter

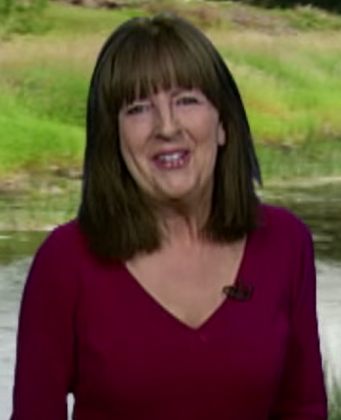
- Cusack in 2015
- Born: 3 November 1957 (age 68); Clonaslee, County Laois, Ireland
- Education: University College Dublin
- Occupations: Meteorologist, presenter
- Years active: 1988–2023

Evelyn Cusack (born 3 November 1957) is an Irish former meteorologist who served as the Head of Forecasting from 2018 at Met Éireann, where she worked from 1981 until her retirement in 2023. She is the longest-serving weather presenter on RTÉ.

== Personal life ==
Cusack was born in Clonaslee, County Laois, the middle child of a family of seven. She attended University College Dublin, earning a bachelor's degree in physics and mathematics (1979) and a master's degree in physics (1984).

== Career ==
Cusack joined the Irish meteorological service Met Éireann in 1981. She was a weather presenter on RTÉ from 1988 until 2018. In 1999, Cusack and other well-known weather presenters such as Gerald Fleming, who were all professional meteorologists, were temporarily let go from their jobs at RTÉ in favour of younger, less qualified presenters. However, after protest from viewers, Cusack and her colleagues were swiftly re-hired.

Cusack received the inaugural UCD Alumni award in science in 2014.

In March 2018, she was promoted to Head of Forecasting at Met Éireann, having previously served as Deputy Head of Forecasting.

On 1 June 2023, she retired from working at Met Éireann after 42 years.

== Television ==
In 2008, she participated in RTÉ reality TV show Fáilte Towers. The show involved thirteen celebrities running a hotel for sixteen days and nights in order to win money for their designated charities. Cusack was the fifth to be eliminated.

In 2015, she met young Johnny O'Loughlin on the Late Late Toy Show who had made a special weather board game for her.

In 2017, she took part in TV3's Celebrity Masterchef.
