= McKenna's Guides =

Independent guides to Irish food and hospitality

The McKennas' Guides, formerly known for sponsorship reasons as the Bridgestone Guides, are independent guides to Irish food and hospitality sponsored by Bridgestone. Written and edited by John McKenna and his wife Sally since 1989, the guides have won André Simon, Glenfiddich and Slow Food awards.

Prints include the Bridgestone Irish Food Guide, The Bridgestone 100 Best Restaurants in Ireland 2011 and The Bridgestone 100 Best Places to Stay in Ireland 2010. The lists of places to eat have been published by the Sunday Times. Restaurants named in these lists display plaques noting this achievement.

== John & Sally McKenna ==
John McKenna and Sally McKenna have compiled the guide books since 1989. In the 1990's they presented a food show for RTÉ, "McKenna's Ireland". They have 3 children. They live near Durrus, in West Cork.
