= Restaurant Patrick Guilbaud =

Coordinates: 53.338384°N 6.252964°W

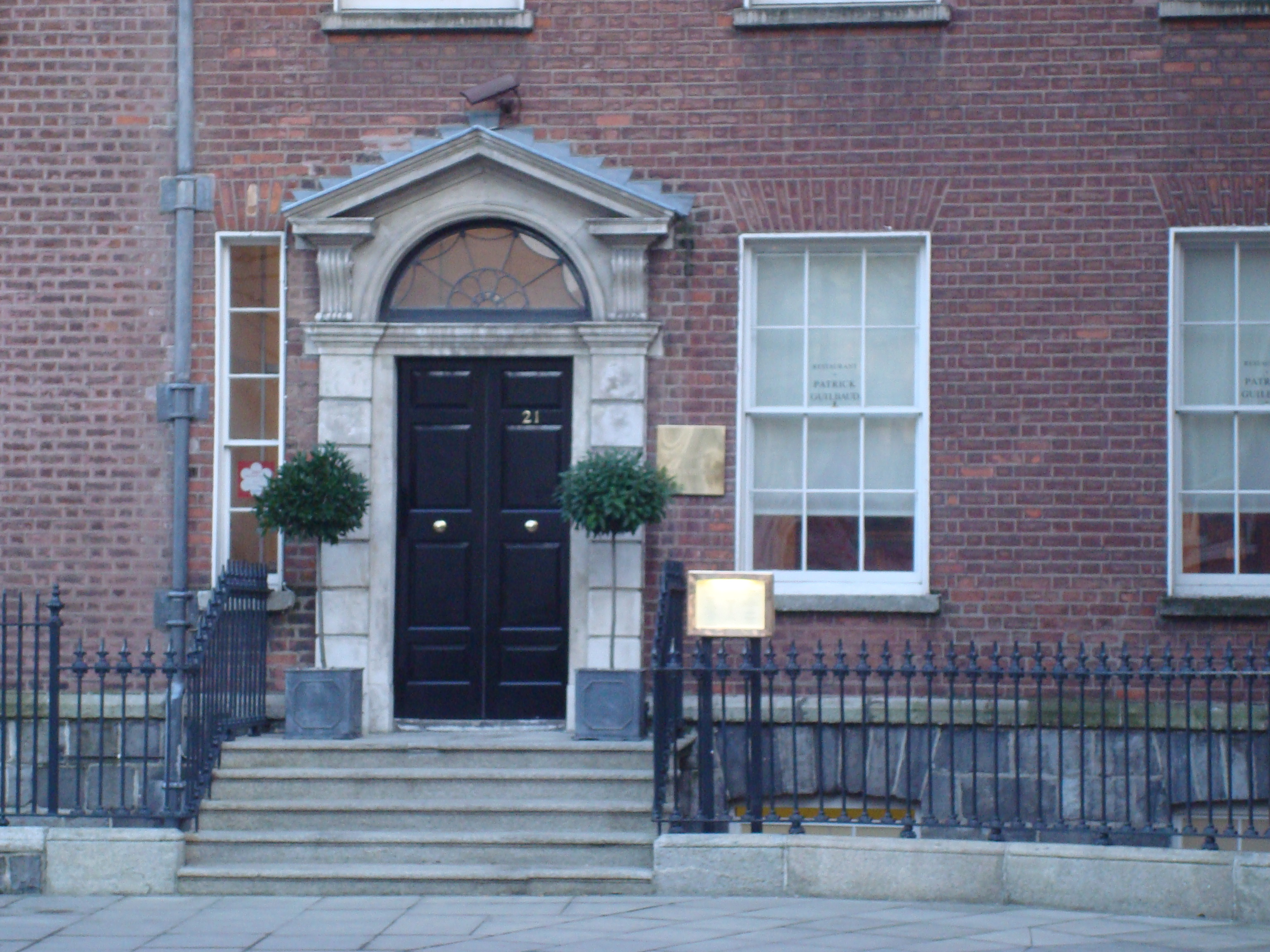

Restaurant information
- Established: 1981
- Owner: Patrick Guilbaud
- Head chef: Guillaume Lebrun
- Food type: French
- Rating: Michelin Guide
- Location: 21 Upper Merrion Street, Dublin, Ireland
- Website: Official site

Restaurant Patrick Guilbaud is a restaurant in Dublin, Ireland. It is a fine dining restaurant that was awarded one Michelin star each year in the period 1989–1995 and two stars each year from 1996 to present. Egon Ronay Guide awarded the restaurant one star in the period 1983–1985 and 1987. It was mentioned in the Guide in 1988 and 1989.

The restaurant is co-owned by the acclaimed French professional chef, Patrick Guilbaud and Stéphane Robin, the restaurant's manager. Restaurant Patrick Guilbaud claims to be Ireland's most award-winning restaurant. It was established by Guilbaud in 1981 in James's Place East, Dublin 2, before moving to the Merrion Hotel in Upper Merrion Street, Dublin 2. The restaurant was the first in Dublin to receive two Michelin stars and has been praised by The New York Times. It has been named the most expensive restaurant in Dublin.

== Reviews ==
In February 2004, Restaurant Patrick Guilbaud was mentioned in The New York Times, where it was reported that lunch cost $36 and dinner was available for $124. Guilbaud's food was described as "seriously good" and was served in "seriously elegant surroundings", with "reservations advised" by the newspaper. Food on offer included roast quail coated with hazelnuts.

== See also ==
- List of Michelin-starred restaurants in Ireland
