= Quay Co-op =

- Quay Co-operative (Cork) Limited
- Formation: 1982-01-01
- Type: Worker Cooperative
- Headquarters: Cork City, County Cork
- Locations: Ireland; Carrigaline; Ballincollig
- Products: Organic groceries; Health food products; Restaurant; Café / deli
- Affiliations: Co-operative Movement; LGBT Movement; Boycott, Divestment and Sanctions
- Website: quaycoop.com

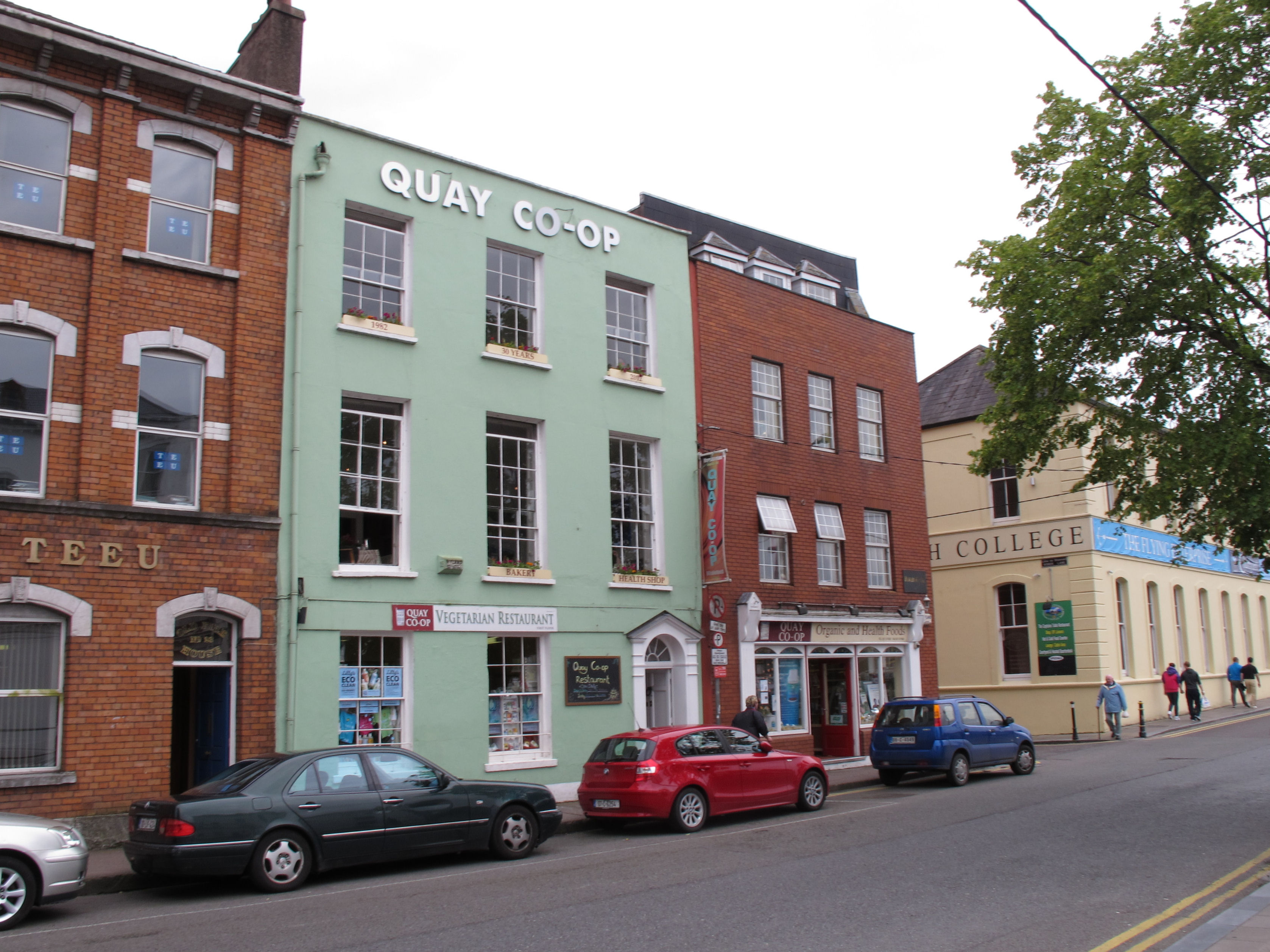
Quay Co-op, Sullivan's Quay, Cork, in 2012.

Quay Co-operative (Cork) Limited, trading as Quay Co-op, is a worker cooperative operating a number of organic, vegetarian wholefoods shops, coffee docks and a restaurant in Cork City and County Cork. It opened in May 1982.

== History ==
The Quay Co-op grew out of a group of feminist, environmental, lesbian and gay, and other social justice activists in the 1980s who set up an alternative resource centre and community space in the city of Cork. The co-op opened in 1982. It was originally set up as a community cooperative with a wider membership, and was operated on a voluntary basis.

As the centre started to develop other activities including a wholefoods buying club and a restaurant, the co-operative began to require a clearer commitment from members to provide their labour as a condition of membership. This had the effect of reducing the membership from over 100 to around 40 people. As the activities of the co-operative became more complex and formalised, the co-operative transitioned from a community-owned model to a worker-owned model.

Celebrity chef Denis Cotter worked at Quay Co-op for four years.

During a challenging period in the 90's, the co-operative required capital to continue operating and investing in the capital of the co-operative became a condition of ongoing membership. The 16 members who invested became the core membership that have remained right through the 2020s.

In 2022, the Quay Co-op had 50 employees spread across a vegetarian deli, bakery, store and restaurant located on O’Sullivan’s Quay, a vegetarian food-production facility on Cove Street and satellite shops in both Carrigaline and Ballincollig.

== Reception ==
The Irish Examiner referred to the Quay Co-op's prepared food range as "famous dahls, curries, soups and vegan dishes."

== Activities ==
Quay Co-op operates its flagship vegetarian wholefoods shop from Sullivan's Quay in Cork City, alongside its award-winning vegetarian restaurant.

The co-operative operates two additional wholefoods shops in the towns of Carrigaline and Ballincollig in County Cork.

== See also ==
- List of food cooperatives
- List of vegetarian and vegan restaurants
