= Patrick Guilbaud =

French chef

- Born: France
- Occupation: Restaurateur
- Employer: Self-employed
- Known for: Restaurant Patrick Guilbaud

Patrick Guilbaud is a French professional chef residing in Ireland and the proprietor of that country's most award-winning restaurant, the self-titled Restaurant Patrick Guilbaud. The restaurant, located in Dublin, was the first in the country to receive two Michelin stars and it has received praise from publications such as The New York Times.

== Style ==
Guilbaud has spoken of his disapproval of the typical kitchen seen on television shows, saying that when an individual enters his kitchen at Restaurant Patrick Guilbaud, they are met with silence. He believes that, whilst the chef must speak, the staff must ultimately work as a team. He has been outspoken of Dylan McGrath, the former proprietor of the Mint in Ranelagh, Dublin, who has been seen on camera shouting and hurling abuse at his staff there. Guilbaud labelled McGrath "sad" on the RTÉ Radio 1 show, Conversations with Eamon Dunphy, after witnessing him shouting and swearing at his Mint staff in the fly on the wall documentary The Pressure Cooker.

== Background ==
Guilbaud moved to Ireland in 1981. He himself never worked in the kitchen of the Michelin-starred Restaurant Patrick Guilbaud. The chef responsible for the restaurant’s acclaimed cuisine from the very beginning was Guillaume Lebrun. There he set up his own self-styled Restaurant Patrick Guilbaud in James's Place East, Dublin 2 before moving in 1998 to the Merrion Hotel in Upper Merrion Street, Dublin 2. In February 2004, it received a mention in The New York Times, with it being reported that lunch there cost US$36 and dinner was available on the premises for as little as US$124. the restaurants food was described as "seriously good" and was served in "seriously elegant surroundings", with "reservations advised" by the newspaper's representative, Robert O'Byrne. Food on offer included roast quail coated with hazelnuts. In 2005 Patrick Guilbaud was commissioned by Tipperary Crystal to design wine glass ranges for them.

== See also ==
- List of Michelin-starred restaurants in Ireland
