= Dylan McGrath =

Irish celebrity chef (born 1977)

- Born: 4 August 1977 (age 49); Dublin, Ireland
- Occupation: Chef
- Employer: Self-employed
- Website: http://www.dylanmcgrath.com/

Dylan McGrath (born 4 August 1977) is an Irish celebrity head chef. He was the owner of the now defunct Michelin-starred restaurant Mint in Dublin which closed as a result of the economic downturn. In August 2010 he opened 'Rustic Stone Restaurant by Dylan McGrath' on South Great George's Street in Dublin's city centre. In 2011 Dylan was announced by RTÉ One as the judge on the Irish version of the show Masterchef. He also appeared in the 2008 RTÉ One television series Guerrilla Gourmet and in the fly on the wall series The Pressure Cooker. Derry Clarke has called him a "brilliant young chef".

== Early life ==
McGrath was born in Dublin and lived in Carlow until age six. He was brought up in west Belfast before attending catering college. He later travelled from Northern Ireland to Great Britain in search of a career, where he worked under chefs such as John Burton Race and Tom Aikens, before returning to Ireland.

== Career ==
=== Guerrilla Gourmet ===
McGrath appeared on the television series, Guerrilla Gourmet, which was broadcast on RTÉ One in early 2008. The premise of the programme was that professional chefs set up temporary "guerrilla restaurants" at an unusual location of their own choosing. McGrath featured on the sixth and final episode of the series. He chose a dark room in the Royal Hospital Kilmainham in Dublin as his temporary restaurant venue, serving a menu of lemongrass and pomegranate dessert. One week after filming an episode for this show, McGrath received his first ever Michelin star.

=== Controversies ===
McGrath has been involved in numerous controversies, mainly with his fellow chefs. Whilst promoting Guerrilla Gourmet, he appeared on the television chat show Tubridy Tonight and sparked off a row with his rival chef Kevin Dundon over his mistreatment of staff in his Pressure Cooker show, an argument which was described by the Irish Independent as being serious enough to "[achieve] the rare feat of having that show discussed at water coolers days later". Relieved of the pressure to obtain a Michelin star, he has softened a bit.

McGrath also has a difficult relationship with Richard Corrigan, who suggested that he should work in theatre, days after he had called Corrigan's food "simple and nice". Corrigan went on to call McGrath "a muppet."

== Restaurants ==
In 2010 McGrath opened Rustic Stone Restaurant. Later he also opened Fade Street Social The Restaurant and Taste at Rustic.

== Awards ==
Dylan has won number of prestigious awards

- Michelin Star; restaurant Mint, 2008 and 2009
- Food and Wine's "Avant-Garde" award; Fade Street Social, 2014
- Good Eating Guide's "Over-all Winner with 'Taste at Rustic' in 2016
- Georgina Campbel's "Chef of the Year 2016"; Taste at Rustic
