= Bibi Baskin =

Irish radio presenter and entrepreneur (born 1952)

- Born: Olive Baskin; 19 May 1952 (age 74); Ardara, County Donegal, Ulster, Ireland
- Occupation: Radio presenter

Olive "Bibi" Baskin (born 19 May 1952) is an Irish radio presenter, hotelier and former television presenter for Raidió Teilifís Éireann (RTÉ). She has been described as "RTÉ's legendary redhead". She has also worked as a magazine and newspaper writer and journalist.

== Career ==
Baskin grew up in Ardara, County Donegal, Ireland, and attended the local Wood School. Her parents were Jack and Hilda Baskin (née Hanlon) and she has two sisters. With RTÉ, she presented a television programme called Evening Extra from 1986 to 1988, and then had her own chat show named Bibi (1988-1992) called Its Bibi (1992-1994). She left the broadcaster in 1994 to work in New York and Great Britain. She returned briefly to RTÉ in 1998 to present The Saturday Show before working on different projects and, while contemplating her next move, decided to write a book.

A practitioner and advocate of Ayurvedic healing medicine and therapies, Baskin visited India with a friend in 2001 and discovered a property in Kerala which had been built in 1868 and inhabited for more than a century by the Raheem family, which she turned into a heritage guest house and hotel. The property opened for business in 2003, with 10 bedrooms, offering yoga and Ayurvedic treatments.

Baskin is fluent in Irish and worked as a teacher of the language at the beginning of her career. She served as one of the judges on the 2008 RTÉ television programme, Fáilte Towers. In 2015, she joined Cork's 96FM to host the morning radio talk show Opinion Line.
