= Conrad Gallagher =

Irish chef/restaurateur (born 1971)

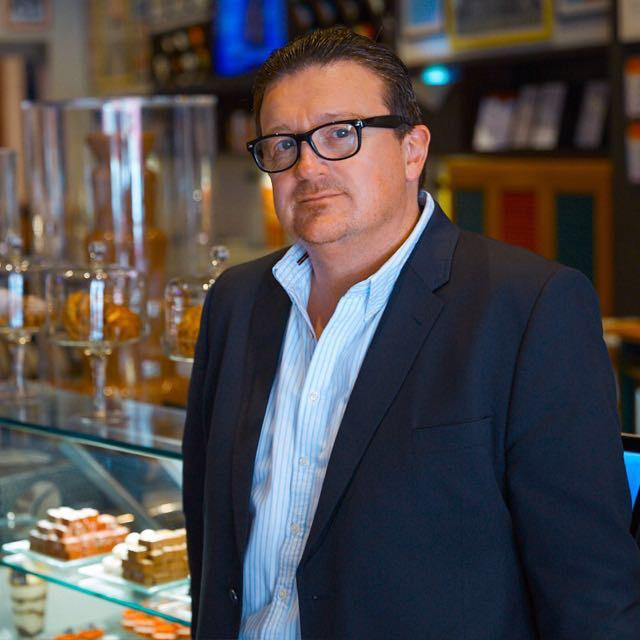
- Conrad Gallagher (2020)
- Born: 12 March 1971 (age 55); Letterkenny, County Donegal, Ireland
- Education: Killybegs Catering College
- Years active: 1987-present
- Culinary career
- Cooking style: Haute cuisine
- Rating
- Michelin stars
- Current restaurants
- Off the Menu Food Emporium, Port Elizabeth, South Africa (2021–present); Off the Menu Food Emporium, St Francis Bay, South Africa (2021–present); Bistro Vin de Boeuf, St Francis Bay, South Africa (2021–present)
- Previous restaurants
- Peacock Alley, Dublin, Ireland (1994–2002)
- Television shows
- Conrad's Kitchen: Access all Areas (2005); Head Chef (2011)
- Website: www.conradgallagher.com

Conrad Gallagher (born 12 March 1971) is an Irish-born chef/restaurateur from Letterkenny, County Donegal, based in Dubai since 2016. He was the youngest chef ever awarded a Michelin star at the time, for Peacock Alley in Dublin, at the age of 26 in 1998. In a career that has attracted both accolades and controversy, Gallagher has owned restaurants in Dublin, New York, London, Las Vegas and Cape Town, and has featured in two reality television cooking series. He opened restaurant consultancy Food Concepts 360 in 2018. Gallagher also owns chef recruitment agency The Chefs Connection and opened The Chefs Playground in Johannesburg, South Africa, in April 2020 as a culinary training centre and specialist shop for chefs’ apparel and equipment. In February 2021, Gallagher opened "Off the Menu Food Emporium", a delicatessen, coffee and wine shop serving tapas-style meals, in Port Elizabeth, South Africa. He also opened Bistro Vin de Boeuf, in St Francis Bay.

== Early life ==
Gallagher was raised in Hawthorn Heights, a housing estate in Letterkenny, County Donegal. He was educated at Scoil Colmcille and St Eunan's College, both schools in Letterkenny. In his autobiography Back on the Menu: My Rollercoaster Life, he revealed how the kitchen was home to him as a child and how he disliked school because of the abuse he received at both institutions.

Inspired by the cooking of his mother and his grandmother, he left St Eunan's at the age of 16 and began training as a chef at Killybegs Catering College. During his formal training, where he worked under some of Ireland's top chefs, Gallagher won four gold medals in the Chef Ireland culinary championship and was selected for the national culinary team that won four gold medals at Hotelympia, the UK's largest food service and hospitality event.

== Career ==
While he was offered career launching positions in Ireland, he determined he should go to New York City to further pursue his dream of becoming a world class chef. In New York, he joined the Plaza Hotel. The Waldorf Astoria's Peacock Alley later recruited him, where he spent two years as sous-chef under Laurent Manrique. While living in New York he went on to work at the restaurants Daniel and Le Cirque. On Saint Patrick's Day 1996, Gallagher cooked for President Bill Clinton and his guests at the White House.

Gallagher and his brother Keith ran the Metropolitan Bar and Restaurant in their native Letterkenny.

=== Peacock Alley ===
Gallagher came to fame with his restaurant Peacock Alley in Dublin, first in Baggot Street, later on St Stephen's Green. With Gallagher at the helm, the restaurant was awarded a Michelin star in 1998, retaining that status until 2002.

=== New York ===
He left Ireland to return to New York City, where he married an American citizen and opened a bar, Traffic, at First Avenue and 50th Street in Manhattan. He was accused in Dublin of stealing three paintings, worth €11,000 from Dublin's Fitzwilliam Hotel. The original contract was furnished stating Gallagher owned the three paintings and the jury returned a 'not guilty' verdict less than two hours after it started deliberations. In his autobiography, Gallagher describes the proceedings as "a bit of a circus" with days that were "long and painful."

=== South Africa ===
Whilst living in South Africa, Gallagher consulted for Sun International Group where he was appointed Group Executive Chef in 2004. He operated Geisha Wok and Noodle Bar in Cape Town, where he occasionally hosted live cooking classes. Geisha Wok and Noodle Bar stopped trading in August 2009 when Gallagher decided to move back to Ireland and open Salon Des Saveurs. He was declared bankrupt in South Africa in August 2009 following an application by two companies seeking payment of debts. Two properties and his home's contents were auctioned off to part-pay debts of about €200,000 to a bank and supplier.

=== Dublin ===
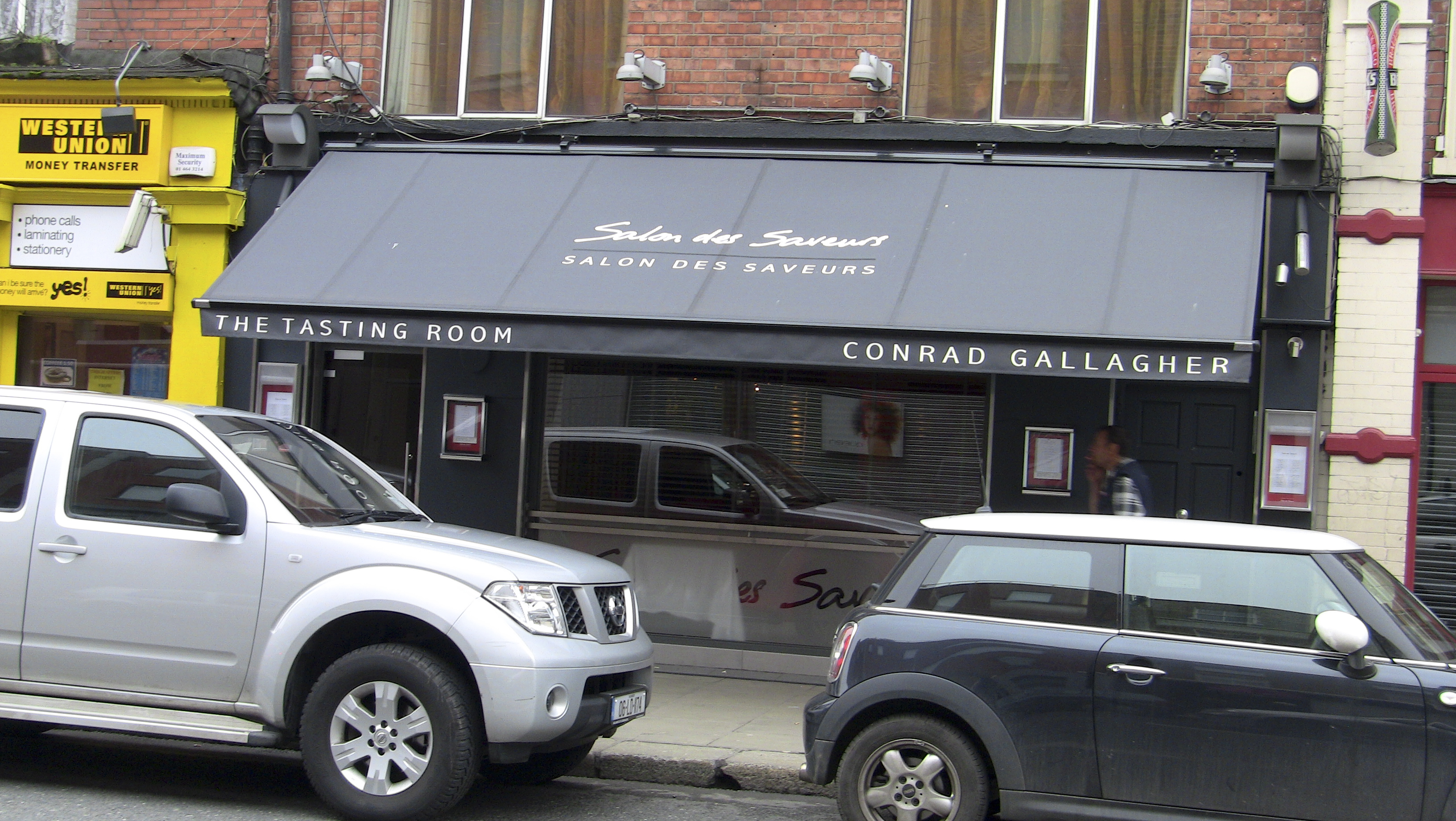
The Tasting Room

After planning to return to Ireland during Summer 2009 to open a new Irish restaurant, Gallagher and his second wife, former Miss Port Elizabeth finalist Candice Coetzee, and their two sons, moved to Dublin. His latest restaurant is called "Salon Des Saveurs". His initial return as director of Boutique Restaurants Concepts Ltd. went sour as it is illegal to be a company director in the Republic of Ireland while considered bankrupt, in or outside the Republic of Ireland.

According to the Irish Independent, Gallagher ran three restaurants in July 2011: "Salon Des Saveurs" and "The Dining Room With Conrad Gallagher" in Dublin and "Conrad's Kitchen" in Sligo. "Salon Des Saveurs" and "Conrad's Kitchen" are run by Boutique Restaurants Concepts Ltd. and Super Potato Limited. The Revenue Commissioners are trying to wind up these two companies.

Gallagher starred in the Head Chef TV shows for TV3 Ireland, where he developed a cooking contest reality show, before moving back to the United States in 2011.

=== Las Vegas ===
In April 2013, Gallagher opened PoshBurger Bistro, a gourmet burger restaurant, in Las Vegas, Nevada, which garnered praise from local critics - John Curtas of Eating Las Vegas said that PoshBurger offered "the best hamburger Vegas neighbourhoods have ever seen”. The restaurant could not get a liquor license and closed after three months.

=== California ===
In October 2013, Ways & Means Oysters in Orange hired Gallagher as a consulting executive chef to develop the menu for its location in Old Towne Orange. He launched Vanity Catering and Events in Costa Mesa in 2014, as owner and executive chef.

=== Cape Town, South Africa ===
Gallagher and his family returned to Cape Town to open and operate Cafe Chic. Later on he opened Gallagher's Restaurant in Cape Town, which later closed.

=== Port Elizabeth, South Africa ===
Gallagher then moved to Port Elizabeth, where he opened Gallagher's on Stanley Street in July 2016.

In 2021 Gallagher opened "Off The Menu Food Emporium", followed by "Bistro Vin De Boeuf", both in St Francis Bay.

=== Qatar ===
Gallagher joined Aura Hospitality & Food Services in December 2016 as Corporate Chef and Culinary Director and was promoted to Managing Director for Hospitality and Food Services in 2018.
In 2019, Gallagher became CEO of Food Concepts 360, an international food and hospitality company with over 500 employees and outlets covering the Middle East and Africa in addition to Los Angeles and Las Vegas.

== Awards ==
Gallagher was awarded a Michelin star in 1998 for his restaurant Peacock Alley in Dublin in 1998.

Gallagher's company Food Concepts 360 was named Best Full-Service Hospitality Company-Middle East and Africa by UK-based LuxLife magazine in 2019 and received the magazine's Excellence Award for restaurant consulting services.

== Television ==
Gallagher was featured cooking at Peacock Alley in Dublin in two episodes of the Great Chefs series "Great Chefs of the World" on Discovery Channel in 1998.

He has headlined two reality television series – Conrad’s Kitchen: Access All Areas on BBC Food in 2005, and Head Chef on Irish national broadcaster RTÉ's TV3 in 2011.

== Health ==
Gallagher has won two battles with cancer. First testicular cancer and in 2003 "a more serious form", about which he has declined to go into detail.

== Publications ==
- Conrad Gallagher's new Irish cooking recipes from Dublin's Peacock Alley, 1997, ISBN 1899047298
- Take 6 ingredients 100 ingenious recipes to create simple, delicious meals, 2003, ISBN 1899047921
- Back on the menu my rollercoaster life, 2010, ISBN 1906353255 / 9781906353254
- One pot wonders, 2011, ISBN 085783018X / 9780857830180
- In 3 easy steps Fabulous food without the fuss, 2011, ISBN 0857830198 / 9780857830197
