= Gillian Bowler =

Irish businesswoman (1952–2016)

- Born: 18 November 1952; London, United Kingdom
- Died: 14 December 2016 (aged 64); Dublin, Ireland
- Occupation: Business
- Spouse: Harry Sydner

Gillian Bowler (18 November 1952 – 14 December 2016) was an Irish businesswoman. She was chair of Fáilte Ireland and the first chair of the Irish Museum of Modern Art. She was also the first female chair of an Irish banking institution, the Irish Life & Permanent.

== Personal life ==
Bowler was born in London on 18 November 1952 and grew up on the Isle of Wight. She left school at 14 after illness, and attended a secretarial college. She got a job working for the council, but found it boring and started a side business organising dances. She then moved to work at a travel agency in London.

Bowler was married to Harry Sydner and had a stepdaughter and granddaughter. She died of kidney disease on 14 December 2016.

== Career ==
Bowler moved to Dublin as a young woman. She and Harry Sydner founded the package holiday company Budget Travel in 1975. The company was known for realistic advertising, and was very successful. Bowler spoke later of the sexism she had experienced in business as a young female outsider.

Bowler and Sydner sold most of the company to Granada in 1987, and their remaining stake in 1996. In 1998, Bowler became a member of the board of Irish Life & Permanent. This made her the first woman to chair an Irish public limited company. Following the 2008 financial crisis, she attracted criticism and death threats. She gave money to people who had been affected by the problems. She remained a chair of the board until 2011.

From 2003 to 2008, she was also the founding chair of Fáilte Ireland. She was interested in modern art and became the first chair of the Irish Museum of Modern Art.

In 2005 Bowler was made a distinguished fellow of Griffith College Dublin in recognition of her public service and the contribution she had made to business.
