= Heat (Irish TV series) =

- Genre: Reality television
- Created by: Loosehorse
- Starring: Kevin Dundon; Kevin Thornton
- Country of origin: Ireland
- Original language: English
- No. of series: 2
- No. of episodes: 14

Production
- Producer: Trish Canning

Original release
- Network: RTÉ One
- Release: July 2008

Heat is an Irish prime time reality television series broadcast on RTÉ One. The programme sees two professional chefs, Kevin Dundon and Kevin Thornton, attempt to train amateur participants to each compose a restaurant menu. Each chef has won one series each. Each series, of which there have so far been two, runs for six weeks. The first series began broadcasting weekly in July 2008, with Team Dundon winning. A second series followed in February 2009, airing on Tuesday nights at 20:30, with Team Thornton winning. Dundon has described the series as being akin to "a fly-on-the wall documentary inside the kitchen of a very high-end kitchen".

== Premise ==
The premise of the programme is that celebrity chefs Dundon and Thornton compete against the other in the act of each mentoring one amateur participant as they compose a menu in the kitchen of the highly regarded Ely HQ restaurant located in the Dublin Docklands. The participants are said to have never previously cooked in a professional environment and applicants must be over the age of eighteen years. The restaurant is effectively "split down the middle", with the winners of the first five shows progressing to the semi-finals. Winning amateurs return the following week to take on a new opponent. Customers pay for a choice of two menus the menu of their choice is rated by them at the end of the night/episode. The contestants are eventually reduced over a six-week period until the season finale when the last remaining amateurs compete against each other. The winners are confirmed using three criteria; "profit", "punters" and "peers". The punters are those who are dining on the night and the peers are those chefs not participating on the night. The winner and their mentor are crowned Heat champions. Prizes include cash prizes and holidays worth €10,000.

== Filming ==
Filming of each series is carried out on an occasional basis over a two-month period.

== History ==
=== Series one ===
RTÉ announced they were searching for a number of amateur chefs to take part in a new television series in March 2008. Each programme was themed, with the first programme having an Irish theme, the second having a budget theme, the third having an Italian theme and the fourth having an Asian theme. Then followed the semi-final and final. Paul Mahon, a classical guitar teacher, was the first Heat champion at the end of the first series, beating Ann Hamil, a businesswoman from Mullingar, County Westmeath. Kevin Dundon was the winning professional chef.

=== Series two ===
RTÉ announced they were searching for a new batch of amateur chefs in October 2008. The second series began on 17 February 2009, with contestants being mentored by Thornton including Westmeath native, John Donlon and Tralee student Niamh Switzer. Engineer Trevor Thornton also featured, being proclaimed the eventual winner in the finale on 14 April 2009. Kevin Thornton was the mentor who won this series. There were eight episodes, with five quarter finals being followed by a chef's choice, a semi-final and the final itself.

== Reaction ==
The Irish Independent's television critic, John Boland, bemoaned RTÉ's habit of giving its programmes one word titles, the first series of Heat coming just before another RTÉ series called Heist. Boland compared Dundon and Thornton to Robert De Niro and Al Pacino, although he stated that "fussing about with vegetable tartlets and raspberry mousses isn't quite as machismo as discharging Magnum 357s and AK-47s in crowded city streets".
