= The Restaurant (Irish TV series) =

- Genre: Reality television
- Country of origin: Ireland
- Original language: English
- No. of seasons: 10
- No. of episodes: 74 (plus specials)

Production
- Running time: 30 minutes (RTÉ) 60 minutes (TV3)

Original release
- Network: RTÉ One (2003–2011); Virgin Media One (2015–present)
- Release: 1 July 2003 – present

The Restaurant is a reality television programme produced by Vision Independent Productions in Ireland. The series first premiered on public service broadcaster RTÉ One where it ran for eight seasons. After a six-year hiatus, the show was renewed by the TV3 Group. The show aired its ninth season on TV3 (now known as "Virgin Media One") from January 2015.

== Format and history ==
The show premiered on RTÉ One in the 2000s. It ran for eight seasons on the public service broadcaster, then, after a six-year hiatus, the show was recommissioned by the TV3 Group. A ninth season aired on TV3 Ireland in 2015.

Each episode features a different head chef, usually claimed to have some sort of celebrity background. Sometimes politicians would participate: among them Enda Kenny (before he was Taoiseach), Ruairi Quinn (before he was Education Minister, but after everything else), Michael Healy-Rae (before he was even a TD) and Alan Shatter (after he was Justice Minister).

=== RTÉ version ===
When it aired on RTÉ, The Restaurant proved to be a very successful format often beating even the likes of Neven Maguire and Donal Skehan's cookery shows in the ratings.

Each episode saw a celebrity head chef taking on the culinary challenge of producing a full three-course meal with two wines. This meal was then served to the restaurant's customers and the resident critics, Tom Doorley and Paolo Tullio, who were joined each week by a guest critic.

When it was on RTÉ, the head chef arrived on location at 10:00 on the day of filming and immediately began working with the team. The head chef's first task was to describe their own menu to the kitchen staff. The head chef worked with Workovich on starters, McAllister on the main courses and Lennox on desserts. They prepared their meal until 18:30 and diners entered the restaurant at 19:00. The head chef left the kitchen at 22:00 to reveal their identity to the dining room. The chef's identity remained a secret to those being served their food until the end of the show, when all had been eaten. The critics gave the meal a star rating of between one and five, which was then pulled from an envelope after the head chef joined the critics' table.

The Restaurant on RTÉ was voiced over by Seán Moncrieff and the restaurant was staffed by John Healy, Maitre'D, the kitchen staff, chefs David Workowich, Stephen McAllister and Louise Lennox, food researcher, Stephen Quin, waiting staff, waitress, Elaine Normile and waiters, Lee Bradshaw and Vivian Reynolds.

During its original run on RTÉ The Restaurant moved location to County Westmeath, where filming took place at Wineport Lodge overlooking Lough Ree, in Glassan village.

RTÉ also published The Restaurant – The Magazine, which included images and recipes from the series.

The Restaurant ran for eight series on RTÉ One, from 1 July 2003 to 5 May 2011, with Christmas and New Year specials in most years. From 2007 the Christmas specials were "Cook-Off" episodes in which two former head chefs who had received the same star rating competed again. The fourth series, broadcast from January 2007, was the first to be filmed at Wineport Lodge. Head chefs who have since died include Tony Fenton and Jon Kenny.

A full list of RTÉ episodes is in the Episodes section.

=== Commercial TV revival ===
The series returned on TV3 on 7 January 2015. The programme was sponsored by Aldi and again voiced by Seán Moncrieff. The six-part series was filmed at Wineport Lodge in Glasson, County Westmeath in November 2014, with each episode running to one hour. The regular food critics are Paolo Tullio and Tom Doorley, along with a guest critic each week.

A new season began airing on TV3 on 10 February 2016. Marco Pierre White's Courtyard Restaurant in Donnybrook was the new venue for the show, and Marco Pierre White also guested for the series as one of the judges alongside Tom Doorley, replacing Paolo Tullio who died in 2015.

== Episodes ==
Series numbers follow RTÉ's own numbering; RTÉ described the January 2007 run as the fourth series. Star ratings are out of five. A dash (-) means the rating or date has not been confirmed by a source.

=== Series 1 (2003) ===
No. overall	No. in series	Head chef	Stars	Original release date
1	1	Brian Kennedy	-	1 July 2003
2	2	Charlie Bird	-	8 July 2003
3	3	Mary O'Rourke	-	15 July 2003
4	4	Jason McAteer	-	22 July 2003
5	5	Brendan O'Carroll	-	29 July 2003
6	6	Seamus Moran	-	5 August 2003
7	7	Mary Kennedy	-	12 August 2003
8	8	Tracy Piggott	5/5 stars	19 August 2003

=== Series 2 (2004) ===
Exact broadcast dates for the second series have not been confirmed. It ran on RTÉ One from about June to August 2004.

No. overall	No. in series	Head chef	Stars	Original release date
9	1	Celia Larkin	2/5 stars	TBA
10	2	Joe Duffy	4/5 stars	TBA
11	3	Paul Costelloe	4/5 stars	TBA
12	4	Ted Walsh	3/5 stars	TBA
13	5	Anna Nolan	4/5 stars	TBA
14	6	George Hook and Brent Pope	3/5 stars	TBA
15	7	Gillian Bowler	5/5 stars	TBA
16	8	Gavin Lambe-Murphy	3/5 stars	TBA
17	9	Leo Enright	3/5 stars	TBA
18	10	Caroline Morahan	4/5 stars	TBA

=== Series 3 (2005) ===
No. overall	No. in series	Head chef	Stars	Original release date
19	1	Simon Delaney	2/5 stars	20 June 2005
20	2	Dermot O'Neill	5/5 stars	27 June 2005
21	3	Enda Kenny	2/5 stars	4 July 2005
22	4	Bláthnaid Ní Chofaigh	2/5 stars	11 July 2005
23	5	Jon Kenny	2/5 stars	18 July 2005
24	6	Peter Kelly	3/5 stars	25 July 2005
25	7	Dana	3/5 stars	TBA
26	8	Helen Dillon	3/5 stars	8 August 2005
27	9	Mary Kingston	4/5 stars	15 August 2005
28	10	Éanna Ní Lamhna	3/5 stars	29 August 2005

=== Series 4 (2007) ===
No. overall	No. in series	Head chef	Stars	Original release date
29	1	Amanda Brunker	5/5 stars	30 January 2007
30	2	Bill Cullen	4/5 stars	5 February 2007
31	3	John Waters	2/5 stars	10 February 2007
32	4	Tom McGurk	3/5 stars	19 February 2007
33	5	Lisa Burke	4/5 stars	27 February 2007
34	6	Tony Fenton	4/5 stars	5 March 2007
35	7	John McGuire	3/5 stars	12 March 2007
36	8	Ruth Scott	3/5 stars	29 March 2007

=== Series 5 (2007) ===
No. overall	No. in series	Head chef	Stars	Original release date
37	1	Gerald Kean	4/5 stars	8 November 2007
38	2	Ray D'Arcy	3/5 stars	11 November 2007
39	3	Pamela Flood	3/5 stars	22 November 2007
40	4	Keith Barry	2/5 stars	30 November 2007
41	5	Kevin Myers	5/5 stars	6 December 2007
42	6	Mary Wilson	3/5 stars	13 December 2007

=== Series 6 (2008–09) ===
No. overall	No. in series	Head chef	Stars	Original release date
43	1	Michael Healy-Rae	3/5 stars	16 November 2008
44	2	Jessica Kürten	2/5 stars	23 November 2008
45	3	Des Cahill	5/5 stars	30 November 2008
46	4	Dominic Mafham	4/5 stars	7 December 2008
47	5	Ciara O'Callaghan	4/5 stars	14 December 2008
48	6	Dermot Bannon	5/5 stars	21 December 2008
49	7	Frank McNamara	2/5 stars	4 January 2009
50	8	Kate O'Toole	4/5 stars	11 January 2009

=== Series 7 (2010) ===
No. overall	No. in series	Head chef	Stars	Original release date
51	1	Francis Brennan	-	21 March 2010
52	2	Tommy Bowe	-	28 March 2010
53	3	Sarah Newman	-	4 April 2010
54	4	Fintan O'Toole	-	11 April 2010
55	5	Dáithí Ó Sé	-	18 April 2010
56	6	Lorraine Keane	-	25 April 2010

=== Series 8 (2011) ===
No. overall	No. in series	Head chef	Stars	Original release date
57	1	Angeline Ball	5/5 stars	31 March 2011
58	2	Ian Dempsey	-	5 April 2011
59	3	Marty Morrissey	-	10 April 2011
60	4	Michael O'Doherty	-	17 April 2011
61	5	Norah Casey	-	26 April 2011
62	6	John Murray	-	5 May 2011

=== RTÉ specials ===
No. in series	Special	Head chef(s)	Stars	Original release date
1	Christmas special	Twink	4/5 stars	23 December 2003
2	New Year's Eve special	Roddy Collins and Bill Hughes	2/5 stars	31 December 2003
3	Christmas special	Diarmuid Gavin	4/5 stars	TBA
4	New Year special	Cathy Kelly	4/5 stars	TBA
5	Christmas special	Ruairí Quinn	3/5 stars	20 December 2005
6	Christmas special	Eddie O'Sullivan	-	27 December 2005
7	Christmas 5 Star Cook-Off	Dermot O'Neill and Gillian Bowler	-	27 December 2007
8	Christmas 5 Star Cook-Off	Kevin Myers and Tracy Piggott	-	28 December 2008
9	Christmas 5 Star Cook-Off	Dermot Bannon and Des Cahill	-	27 December 2009
10	Christmas 2 Star Cook-Off	Mary Kennedy and Simon Delaney	-	30 December 2009
11	Christmas 3 Star Cook-Off	Dáithí Ó Sé and Ray D'Arcy	-	28 December 2010
12	Christmas 5 Star Cook-Off	Amanda Brunker and Fintan O'Toole	-	29 December 2010
13	Christmas 4 Star Cook-Off	Gerald Kean and Joe Duffy	-	24 December 2011
14	Christmas 3 Star Cook-Off	George Hook and Tom McGurk	-	28 December 2011

=== Series 9 (2015, TV3) ===
No. overall	No. in series	Head chef	Stars	Original release date
63	1	Alan Shatter	4/5 stars	7 January 2015
64	2	Jackie Lavin	2/5 stars	14 January 2015
65	3	Andrew Trimble	3/5 stars	21 January 2015
66	4	Marie Cassidy	4/5 stars	28 January 2015
67	5	Rozanna Purcell	4/5 stars	4 February 2015
68	6	Sharon Shannon	3/5 stars	11 February 2015

=== Series 10 (2016, TV3) ===
No. overall	No. in series	Head chef	Stars	Original release date
69	1	Rory Cowan	-	10 February 2016
70	2	Eva Orsmond	-	17 February 2016
71	3	Nathan Carter	3/5 stars	24 February 2016
72	4	Kevin Kilbane	4/5 stars	2 March 2016
73	5	Pippa O'Connor	4/5 stars	9 March 2016
74	6	Seán Gallagher	3/5 stars	16 March 2016

=== Other episodes ===
These TV3 episodes have not yet been dated:

- Maria Walsh
- Ken Doherty received 4 stars.
- Una Healy received one star.
- Maura Derrane

== International versions ==
The format is sold internationally by Vision Independent Productions under the title The Secret Chef. It has had three seasons in Italy.
