= Kevin Dundon =

Irish celebrity chef television personality and author (born 1966)

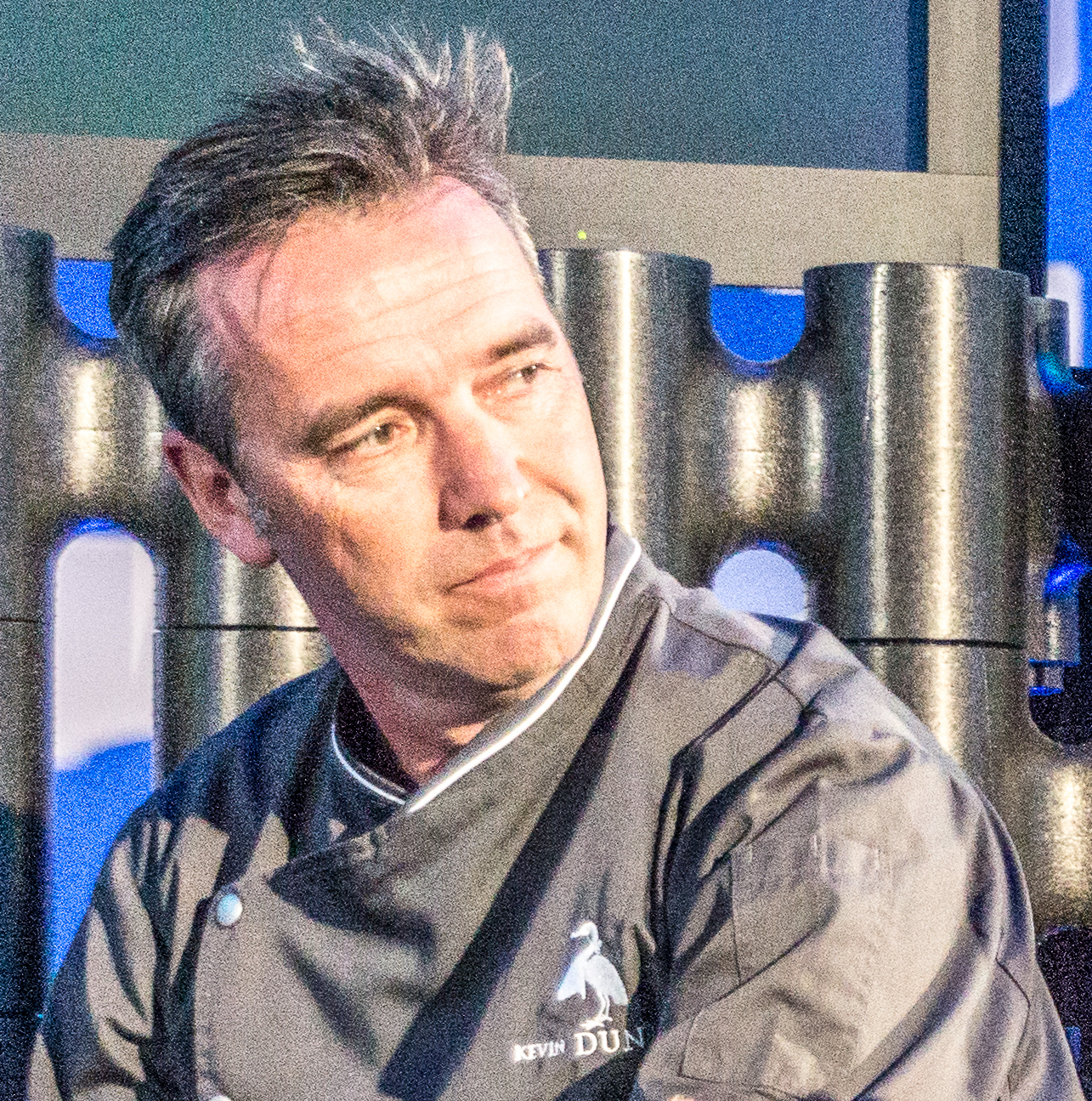
- Dundon in 2015 interview
- Born: 19 July 1966 (age 60); Dublin
- Education: Dublin College of Catering
- Occupation: Chef
- Employer: Self-employed
- Known for: Heat, Guerrilla Gourmet, Dunbrody Country House Hotel
- Spouse: Catherine
- Children: Emily, Sophie, Tom

Kevin Dundon (born 19 July 1966) is an Irish celebrity chef, television personality and author, known for being featured on television series such as Guerrilla Gourmet and Heat. He is the author of the book, Full on Irish: Contemporary Creative Cooking and his recipes have been featured in publications such as the Sunday Tribune and Weekend magazine in the Irish Independent. He has also cooked for The Queen and both an Irish and a US president.

Dundon is the owner of Dunbrody Country House Hotel, in County Wexford, which also houses the Dunbrody Cookery School; the "signature chef" of an "Irish gastropub" located in Walt Disney World in Orlando, Florida; and the "face" of Las Vegas's Nine Fine Irishmen New York-New York Hotel located restaurant. He has appeared many times on Irish, British, Canadian and American television, including The Afternoon Show on RTÉ One, BBC One's Saturday Kitchen, UKTV's Great Food Live, the Canadian Broadcasting Corporation, ESPN Cable and CBS's The Saturday Early Show.

== Career ==
=== Early career ===
Dundon was born in Dublin. He worked on a scholarship in Switzerland after finishing school and completing a course at Dublin Institute of Technology, graduating in 1986. He began his career by working in The Old Schoolhouse, a restaurant in Dublin. He then had a job cooking on a cruise liner in the Caribbean before furthering his career by spending eight years at the Fairmont Hotels and Resorts in Canada, at the age of twenty-two becoming the youngest ever executive head chef in the company's history. Dundon returned to Ireland in 1994 and was named the executive chef at Dublin's Shelbourne Hotel. He opened Dunbrody at the age of thirty, four years after this.

=== Recent career ===
In May 2005, Dundon opened the Raglan Road Irish gastropub in Disney World, Florida.

In 2006, Dundon published Full on Irish: Contemporary Creative Cooking, his first cookery book. He began to feature regularly on The Afternoon Show.

On 17 March 2007, he was featured on CBS's The Saturday Early Show.

In February 2008, Dundon featured in the first episode of Guerrilla Gourmet, a television series which had six professional chefs attempt to set up their own temporary restaurant in an unusual location. He established his restaurant in Saint Saviour's Boxing Club in Waterford. Four of the fifty members of the boxing club prepare the food, including pigeon and tomato and poitín soup, in the temporary kitchen.

In March 2008, he opened his second American restaurant in Kansas City.

In July 2008, the reality television series, Heat, was launched. Two series of the programme have been produced, with Dundon taking on rival chef Kevin Thornton in each. He was Heat Champion in the first series but lost the second series to Thornton.

In April 2009, he helped launch the outdoor Taste of Dublin festival alongside fellow chef Thornton. Dundon also demonstrated his cookery skills at Dungarvan Town Hall in County Waterford as part of the second annual Waterford Festival of Food in April 2009.

Kevin's TV presence increased with his popularity. He could be seen throughout the 2000s on Today; SuperValu: Best of Real Food Miniseries; Heat; The Afternoon Show; Take On the Takeaway; Guerrilla Gourmet; On The Fly; Home Cooking and Family Food; Hip World Gourmet; You're Not the Man I Married; and Celebrity "Jigs ‘n’ Reels"; and BBC's Stuffed. Additionally he made guest appearances on Tubridy Tonight (RTÉ); Ask Anna (RTÉ); CBC (LIVE) CANADA; The Early Show: Shoestring's St. Patrick's Day Feast (CBS); Dinner and a Movie (TBS); ESPN; Food Poker (BBC 2); Great Food Live (UKTV); No Frontiers Travel Show; Sara's Secret (Food Network); Saturday Kitchen (BBC 1); The Panel (RTÉ); The Saturday Early Show (CBS); The Today Programme (BBC 1); and The Today Show (NBC).

In 2009, Kevin also hosted RTÉ's primetime show 'Heat', appeared on RTÉ's travel show 'No Frontiers' and BBC's 'You're Not the Man I Married'. He also released his cookbook, Great Family Food, a number one best-seller in hardback non-fiction in Ireland.

In 2010, Kevin hosted RTÉ's third season of 'Heat', appeared on RTÉ's cooking show 'Take On the Takeaway' and co-hosted BBC's four-part series 'Stuffed'.

Spring 2013 marked Kevin's Full on Irish debut throughout North America as Allied Rich launched his full signature Housewares Collection and product website www.kevindundonhome.com. The high quality of the brand captured the attention of buyers worldwide and led to online retail partnerships with Kohl's, JC Penney, Bed Bath & Beyond, Best Buy, Amazon, Wayfair, Groupon, Hautelook, Bonton, Fab, and My Habit. After the overwhelming success of the collection through both online retailers and Good Morning America's ‘Deals and Steals’, ShopHQ ordered speciality collections both in 2013 and 2014, solely available through ShopHQ, which Kevin promotes live, on-air continuously.

Fall 2013 brought the launch of Kevin's eight-part cooking series, Kevin Dundon's 'Modern Irish Food' and his Christmas Special, 'Christmas Made Easy', both on PBS affiliate stations across America and Ireland's leading network RTÉ. Its audience appeal garnered network attention, leading to a prime time nationwide time slot on 175 Create TV stations beginning 6 March 2014, 75% of US households!

Dundon is featured on Ireland's national airline, Aer Lingus, inflight entertainment on all transatlantic flights and 'Modern Irish Food' will be transmitted on that channel until the end of 2015.

Kevin Dundon writes a weekly column for The Sunday World, and contributes regularly to eight regional publications. He has authored several cookbooks, including Great Family Food, Recipes That Work, and Modern Irish Food. He also hosted the television series Modern Irish Food.

In addition, Ireland's other top newspapers – the Irish Times, the Sunday Times and the Irish Examiner – regularly feature recipes and articles about Kevin and reviews of his hotel Dunbrody Country House in Wexford.

Dundon is known in Ireland as the Good Food Ambassador for the largest food retailer Super Valu and internationally is often selected as the Face of Irish Food by Tourism Ireland. This year will see him featured with the Irish tourism authority at the New York Food & Wine festival, Austin Food & Wine Festival, Boston ifex and in Autumn as a major part of the line up for the Epcot Food & Wine festival with dinners and events highlighting Kevin's food from Raglan Road (winner of top restaurant in Orlando award in February 2014). A new book called "I'd Ate The Back Door Buttered, Ma!" from Raglan Road will be published in March 2014.

In 2025, Dundon took part in the eighth season of Dancing with the Stars. He partnered with professional dancer, Rebecca Scott. They reached the quarterfinals of the series finishing in sixth place.

== Celebrity clients ==
Dunbrody has been visited by U2 frontman Bono, President of Ireland Mary McAleese and BBC television personality and actor Graham Norton. Dundon has also cooked for monarchs and presidents, including Elizabeth II of the United Kingdom and former US president, George W. Bush.

== Personal life ==
Dundon is married to Catherine O'Shea Dundon, and the couple have three children: Emily, Sophie and Tom. Dundon and his family moved into their third Irish home, a new 4,000-square-foot (370 m^{2}) house in Dunbrody, in March 2008 after three years waiting for it to be built. Dundon, wife and daughters had previously lived "over the shop" in Dunbrody, in a thatched cottage in Kilmore Quay, County Wexford, and in Beggar's Bush in Dublin when Dundon was executive chef at the Shelbourne Hotel. His favourite room in his current house is the kitchen.

Dundon has "a huge passion" for architecture. He collects Architectural Digest and is always reading architectural magazines on aeroplanes. His favourite television programmes include Prison Break and CSI.
