= Kevin Thornton (chef) =

Irish chef

- Born: Cashel, County Tipperary
- Education: Culinary Arts at Regional Technical College Galway
- Occupations: Celebrity chef; author
- Employer: Self-employed
- Known for: Heat, Guerrilla Gourmet, Thornton's Restaurant
- Spouse: Muriel
- Children: Edward, Conor

Kevin Thornton is an Irish celebrity chef, radio and television personality and author, known for featuring on television series such as Guerrilla Gourmet and Heat and characterised by a supposed dislike of potato chips and confirmed dislike of pizza. He has written a book, Food for Life, and had his recipes featured on the national radio station Newstalk. He has been praised by The New York Times and featured in publications such as The Dubliner and the Irish Independent.

Thornton was the first Irish chef to achieve two Michelin stars. Thornton has received numerous awards and was named Food & Wine Magazine/'s Chef of the Year for Ireland in 2007.

== Style ==
Thornton views his profession as being similar to theatre and performance and was famously embroiled in a controversy in 2007 surrounding his alleged refusal to sell chips to his restaurant customers, sparking comparisons to the hot-headed British chef Gordon Ramsay. One customer requested the food but, upon receiving it, he changed his mind and sent them back to the kitchen. Thornton then allegedly emerged from the kitchen with the chips and slammed them down on the man's table, with the remark: "They were cooked specially for you, so you eat them, you dickhead". Asked about the incident by broadcaster Joe Duffy on his RTÉ Radio 1 Liveline programme, Thornton stressed that he had not so much been infuriated by the request of chips (he supposedly provides them for younger customers on a regular basis) but that he had been aggravated by the attitude of this particular customer. The incident has since seen Thornton become associated with a dislike of chips and, as recently as 2009, has been crafted as a pun by the Irish media for any other outlet which does not serve the food. Thornton has also expressed the desire that his and other similar Irish restaurants not be viewed as elitist by Irish clientele, but instead be embraced above poor quality, cheaper alternatives.

== Early life ==
Thornton was born rurally in Cashel, County Tipperary, as one of nine children born to Rita and Ned. He and his siblings were encouraged by their parents to cook, clean and sew from a young age. Thornton however pursued an interest in nature at this time. He spent summers helping out on a relative's farm and worked in a local abattoir and both experiences formed the basis of early training for his career. He later studied culinary arts at Regional Technical College Galway, now Galway-Mayo Institute of Technology.

== Career ==
Thornton's career has led to him working globally, in countries such as Canada, France and Switzerland, working in an abattoir and a vineyard as well as in the kitchen.

He opened his first restaurant - The Wine Epergne with his wife, Muriel, in Dublin's Rathmines district in 1990 and followed this by opening Thornton's Restaurant in Portobello in 1995 gaining the first Star in 1996 and the second in 2001. Thorntons moved to the Fitzwilliam Hotel on St Stephen's Green in 2002. Thornton published the book Food for Life in 2005.

Thornton's Restaurant in Dublin city centre, had received two Michelin stars. In 2006 he lost his second star, and in 2015 he lost the remaining star.

He has appeared on programmes such as The Afternoon Show.

In February 2008, Thornton featured in the third episode of Guerrilla Gourmet, a television series which had six professional chefs attempt to set up their own temporary restaurant in an unusual location. He chose to house his temporary restaurant at the Rock of Cashel in County Tipperary, having grown up in the area as a child. He cooked rabbit, scallops and sea urchins for twenty-eight people without the use of electricity.

In July 2008, the reality television series, Heat, was launched. Two series of the programme have been produced, with Thornton taking on rival chef Kevin Dundon in each. He was Heat Champion in the second series but lost the first series to Dundon.

In April 2009, Thornton co-launched the Taste of Dublin festival together with Dundon.

On 1 September 2016 it was announced that Thornton's Restaurant would close on 29 October 2016.

== Awards ==
- Thornton was named Food & Wine Magazine's Chef of the Year for Ireland in 2007.
- Two Michelin stars: 2001-2005
- One Michelin star: 1996-2000 and 2006–2015

== Personal life ==
Thornton is married to his wife named Muriel. He has two sons, Edward and Conor, and three grandchildren - Isaac, Esmee and Oscar. He is fond of photography and scuba diving.
