= List of hotels in Ireland =

According to the Irish Hotels Federation (IHF), it represents nearly 1,000 hotels and guesthouses in Ireland. This is a list of notable hotels in Ireland, mostly historic hotels, or four or five-star modern hotels. It is intended that they are covered in multiple secondary sources. They are arranged by the Counties of Ireland. Hotels and guesthouses with a Michelin Star includes: K Club and Wild Honey Inn.

== County Clare ==
Hotel	Location	Opened	Closed	Chain	Proprietor	Class	Number of rooms	Notes
Atlantic Hotel	Spanish Point	c. 1810	1930					
Dromoland Castle	Near Newmarket-on-Fergus		—N/a			5 stars		Famous guests include Muhammad Ali, George W. Bush, Bill Clinton, Juan Carlos I and Nelson Mandela
Moy House			—N/a					
Wild Honey Inn	Lisdoonvarna		—N/a			(page says both - section 1 and section 3)	14	

== County Cork ==
Hotel	Location	Opened	Closed	Chain	Proprietor	Class	Number of rooms	Notes
Cork International Hotel	Near Cork Airport	1 July 2007	—N/a			4 stars	145	
The Montenotte Hotel	Montenotte		—N/a			4 stars		
Imperial Hotel		1813	—N/a					Michael Collins stayed here before he died. Daniel O'Connell and Frederick Douglass stayed here.

== County Dublin ==
Hotel	Location	Opened	Closed	Chain	Proprietor	Class	Number of rooms	Notes
The Belvedere Hotel	Great Denmark Street		—N/a			3 stars		
Berkeley Court Hotel	Ballsbridge	21 July 1978	1 January 2016		Pascal Vincent Doyle	5 stars	200	
Burlington Hotel	Dublin 2	1972	—N/a	Clayton Hotels		4 stars		
Clarence Hotel	6–8 Wellington Quay	1852	—N/a			4 stars		
Clontarf Castle	Clontarf		—N/a					
Gresham Hotel	O'Connell Street	1817	—N/a			4 stars		The final third of James Joyce's short story "The Dead" i set here
InterContinental Dublin	Ballsbridge	February 2001	—N/a	InterContinental	John C. Malone	5 stars	265	
Merrion Hotel			—N/a			5 stars		Reputed birthplace of Arthur Wellesley, 1st Duke of Wellington
Mornington House	Merrion Street		—N/a					
Mount Herbert Hotel	Old Haig's Distillery		—N/a			4 stars	168	
Royal Hibernian Hotel	Dawson Street	1751	1982			5 stars		
Shelbourne Hotel	St Stephen's Green	1824	—N/a			5 stars		Mentioned in James Joyce's Ulysses. The Constitution of the Irish Free State was drafted in the hotel in 1922, in what is now known as The Constitution Room.
Wynn's Hotel	Abbey Street	17 December 1926	—N/a			4 stars		

== County Galway ==
Hotel	Location	Opened	Closed	Chain	Proprietor	Class	Number of rooms	Notes
Ashford Castle	Lough Corrib		—N/a			5 stars		Guests include Oscar Wilde, George V and Ronald Reagan
Ballynahinch Castle	Connemara		—N/a			4 stars	Billionaire Denis O'Brien and his wife Catherine	Guests include Gerald Ford, Daniel O'Connell, Ranjitsinhji and Éamon de Valera

== County Kildare ==
Hotel	Location	Opened	Closed	Chain	Proprietor	Class	Number of rooms	Notes
Barberstown Castle	Straffan					4 stars		
Carton House	Maynooth					5 stars		
K Club	Straffan							
Kilkea Castle	Kilkea							

== County Kerry ==
Hotel	Location	Opened	Closed	Chain	Proprietor	Class	Number of rooms	Notes
Butler Arms Hotel	Waterville	1884	—N/a					
Sheen Falls Lodge	Overlooks Kenmare Bay	1991	—N/a			5 stars	77	

== County Limerick ==
Hotel	Location	Opened	Closed	Chain	Proprietor	Class	Number of rooms	Notes
Adare Manor	Adare		—N/a			5 stars		
Clarion Hotel	Limerick		—N/a					Ireland's tallest hotel
Glin Castle	Glin	1993	2008					

== County Meath ==
- Bellinter House

== County Tipperary ==
- Cashel Palace Hotel | Cashel
- Hayes' Hotel | Thurles

== County Westmeath ==
Hotel	Location	Opened	Closed	Chain	Proprietor	Class	Number of rooms	Notes
Annebrook House Hotel	Mullingar	9 February 2007	—N/a		Berty Dunne	4 stars	93	One of the oldest buildings still standing in Mullingar
Bloomfield House Hotel	Lynn	27 July 1979	—N/a		John Connaughton; Edward Reilly; Patrick A. Fitzgerald; John P. Foy	4 stars	111	
Greville Arms Hotel	Mullingar	1858	—N/a		Christy Maye	3 stars	40	One of the few surviving Irish hotels known to James Joyce and mentioned by him in his writings.

== County Wexford ==
- Dunbrody Country House Hotel

== County Wicklow ==
- Powerscourt Hotel | Enniskerry | | 203
