= Dublin Landings =

Mixed use property development in Dublin, Ireland

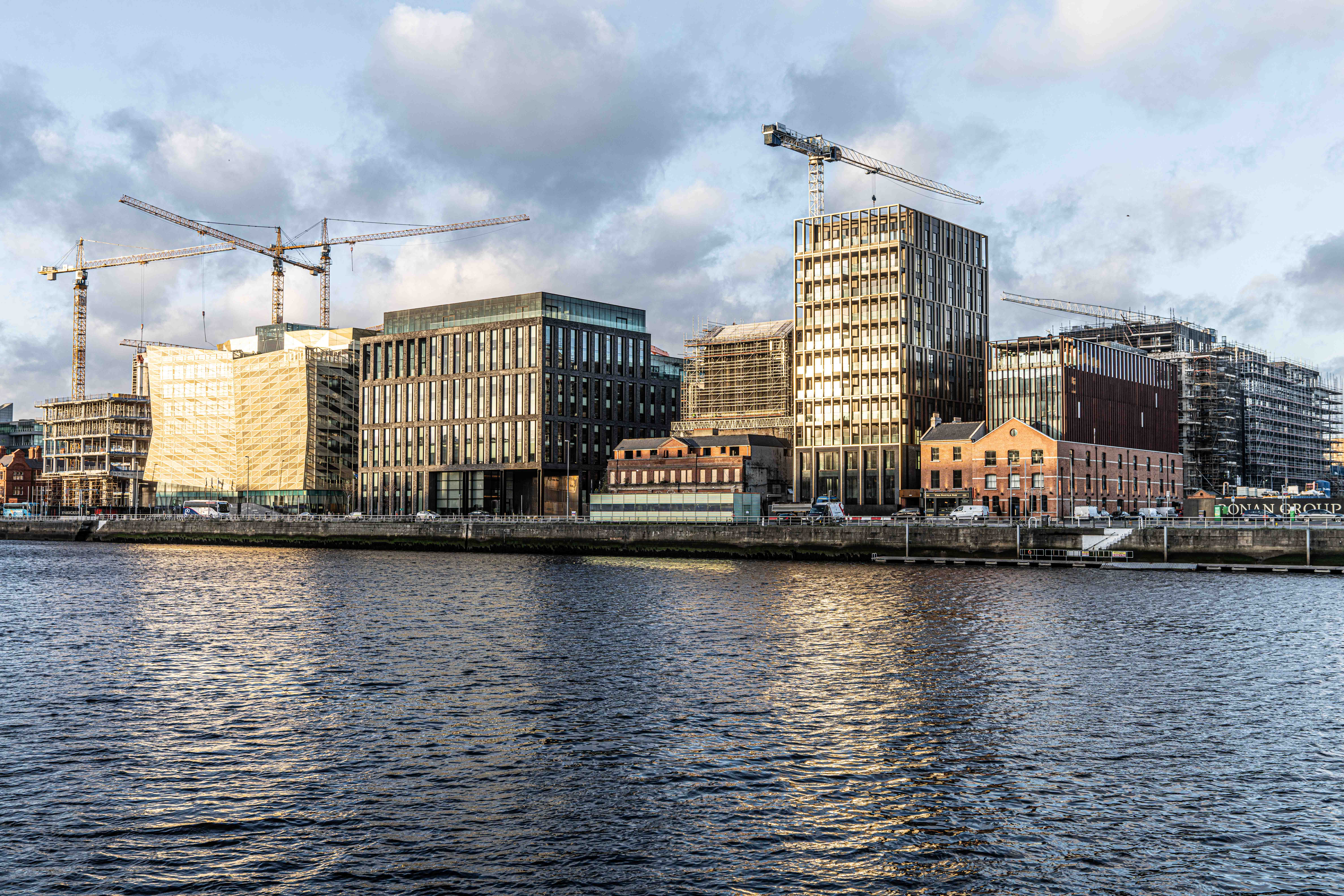
- A view of North Wall Quay and Dublin Landings from Sir John Rogerson's Quay

Project
- Status: Complete (2021)
- Developer: Ballymore Group and Oxley Holdings
- Architect: RKD; Arrow Architects
- Owner: IPUT plc Greystar Real Estate Partners; Central Bank of Ireland; JR AMC (South Korean REIT)
- Website: www.dublinlandings.com

Physical features
- Streets: Fish Lane, Slate Street

Location
- Interactive map of Dublin Landings
- Coordinates: 53.3477°N 6.2346°W
- Location: Ireland
- Address: North Wall Quay, Dublin 1, Ireland

Area
  - Land: 2.35 ha (5.8 acres)

Dublin Landings is a commercial and residential development in the Docklands Strategic Development Zone and within the International Financial Services Centre (IFSC) along the Dublin quays, Ireland. The development includes 300 private rented sector apartments, 70,000 sq m of commercial space and 1,600 sq m of retail and leisure space. The 2.35-hectare (5.8-acre) site was developed by the Ballymore Group and Oxley Holdings and as of 2022 occupiers include tenants such as WeWork, the NTMA, National Asset Management Agency. The Central Bank of Ireland is located directly next to the Dublin Landings development.

In 2015, the Danish firm ARROW Architects emerged as the winners of the architectural competition, following which RKD was selected as the executive architects for the project.

Greystar acquired 268 apartments and 210 car parking spaces in July 2019 for an estimated €154.6m. A South Korean real estate investment trust, JR AMC, acquired 2 Dublin Landings for €106.5m in November 2018 and the Central Bank of Ireland acquired building 4 and 5 for a combined €210m in the same period. The 2 Dublin Landings building has since been renamed Treasury Dock. In December 2019, the developers agreed to sell Number 3 Dublin Landings to IPUT plc for €115m.

The development includes the original planned site of the headquarters of Anglo Irish Bank.

== Notable buildings ==
- Central Bank of Ireland headquarters and former site of Anglo Irish Bank headquarters
- NTMA headquarters at 'Treasury Dock'

== Gallery ==
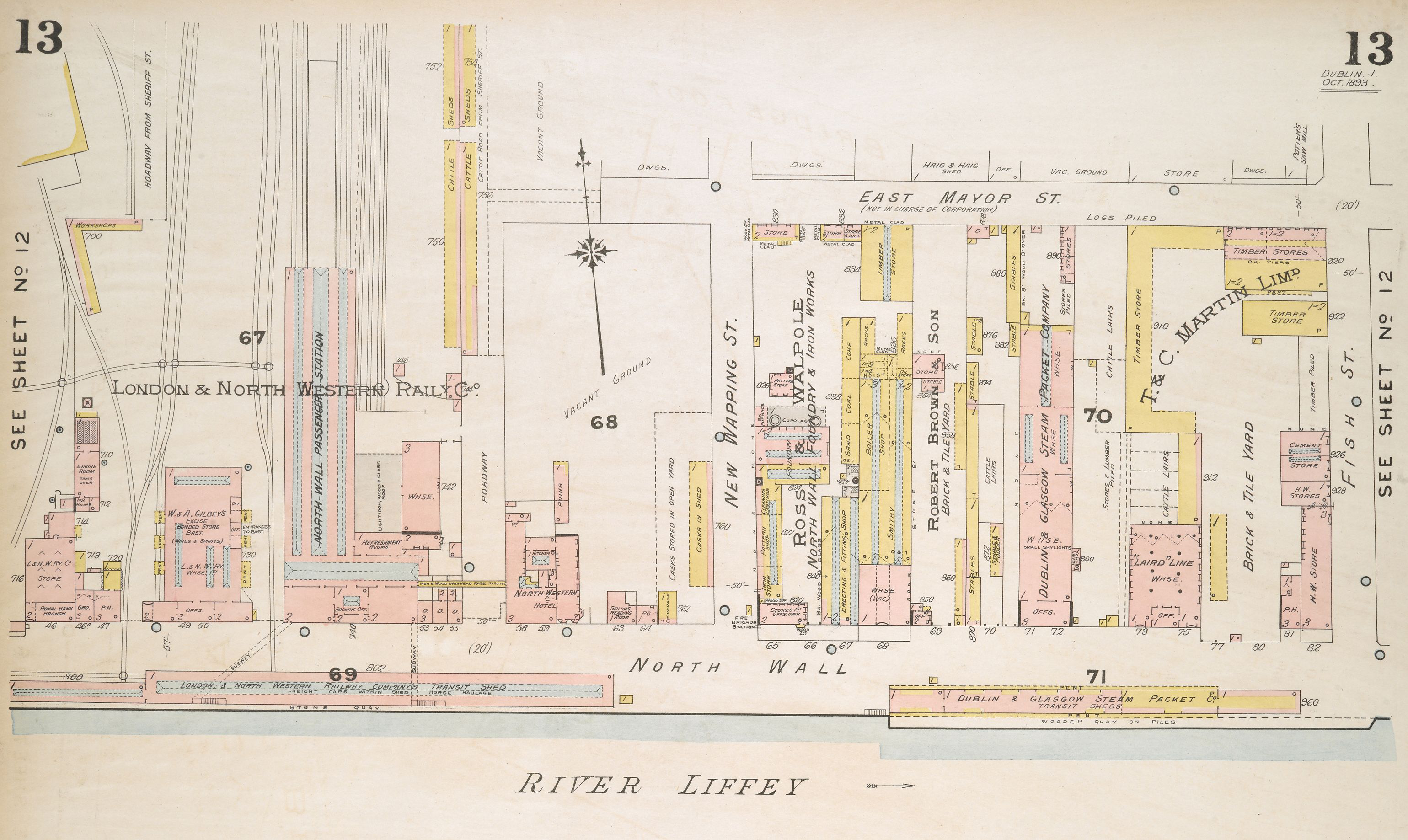
Insurance Plan of the City of Dublin from the 19th century showing the industrial businesses operating from the area

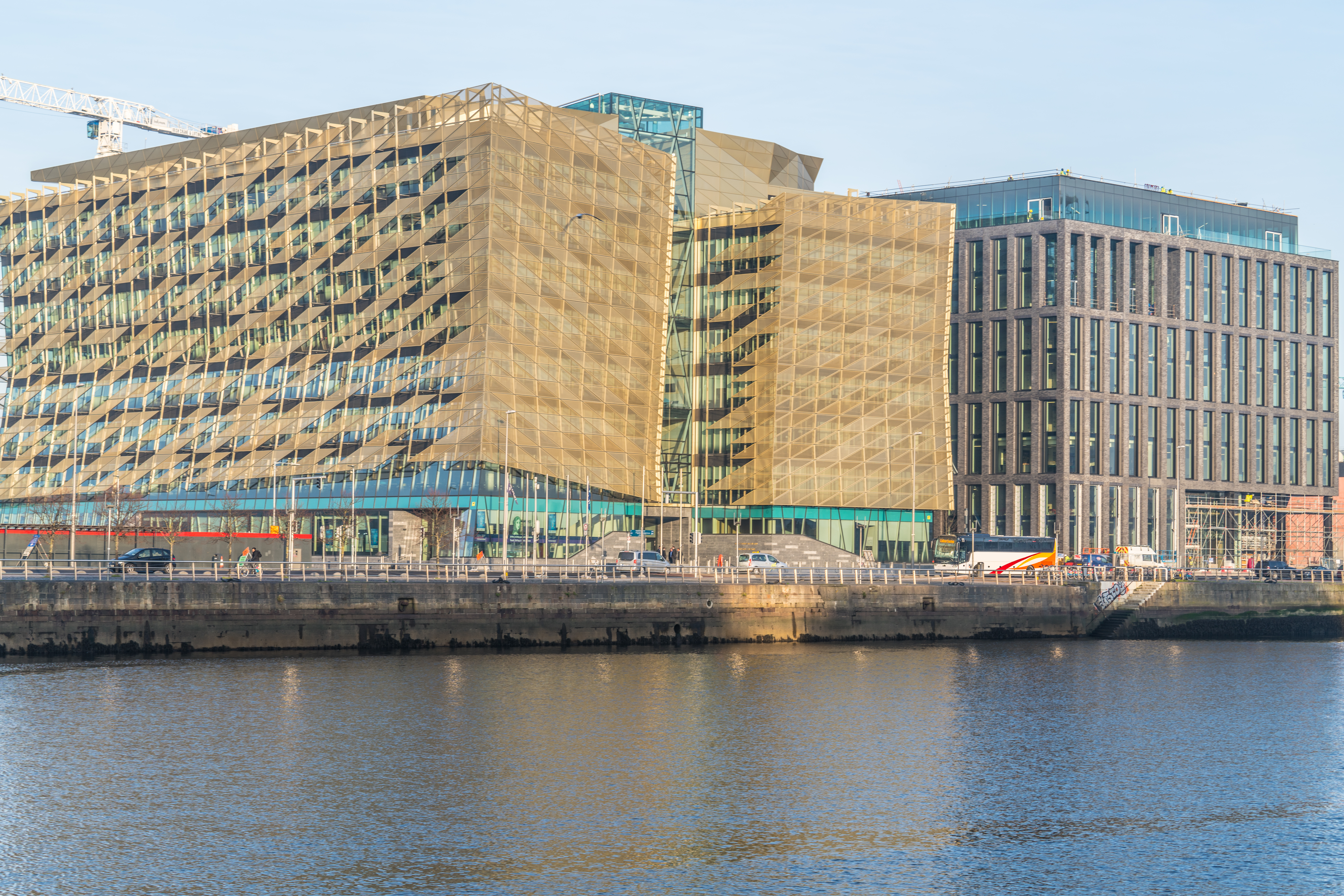
The Central Bank of Ireland head office (L) and the NTMA head office at 2 Dublin Landings on North Wall Quay, in the IFSC, Dublin

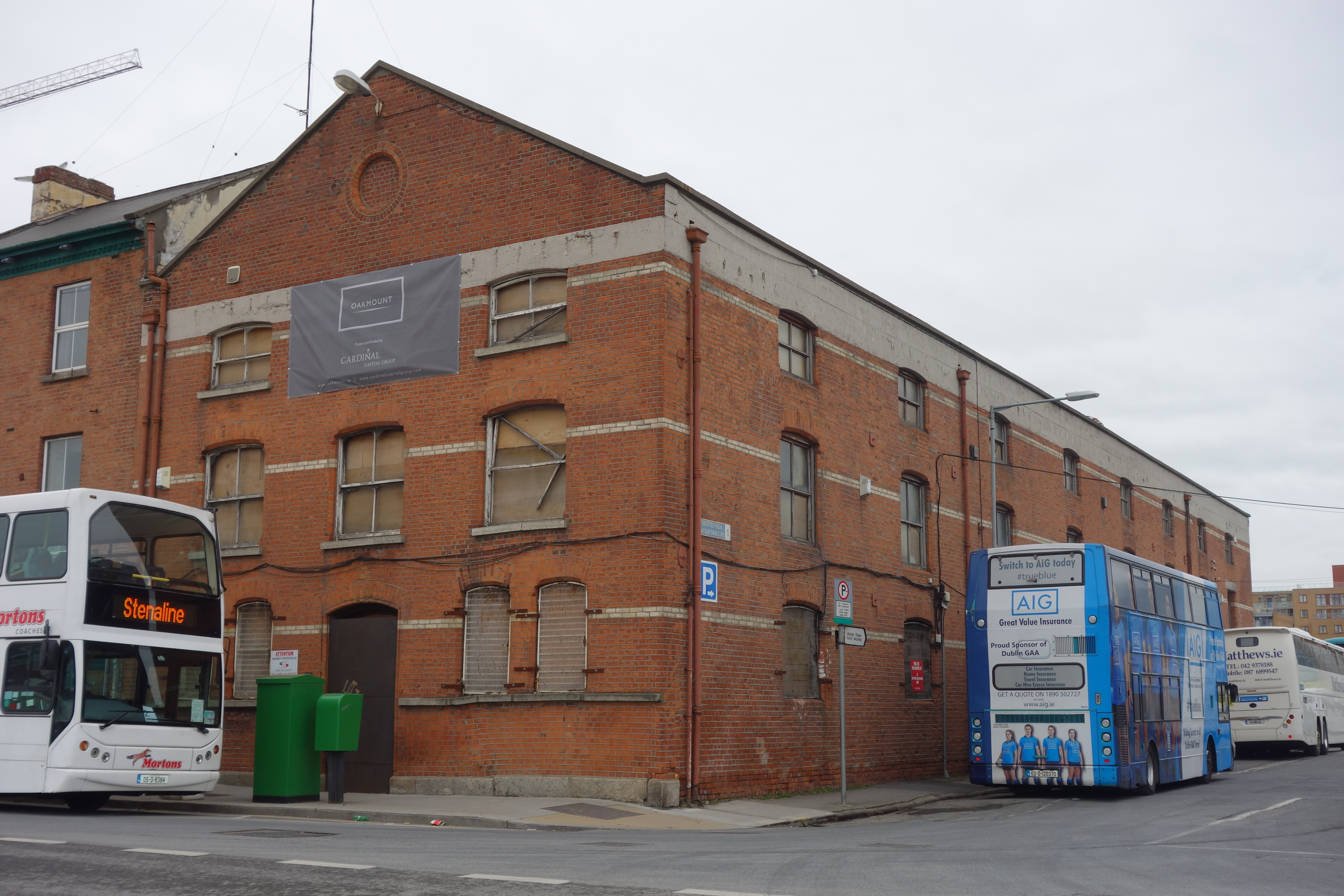
81/82 North Wall Quay, Castleforbes Road - a hotel developed by Press Up Entertainment and former site of Vallence and McGrath's pub

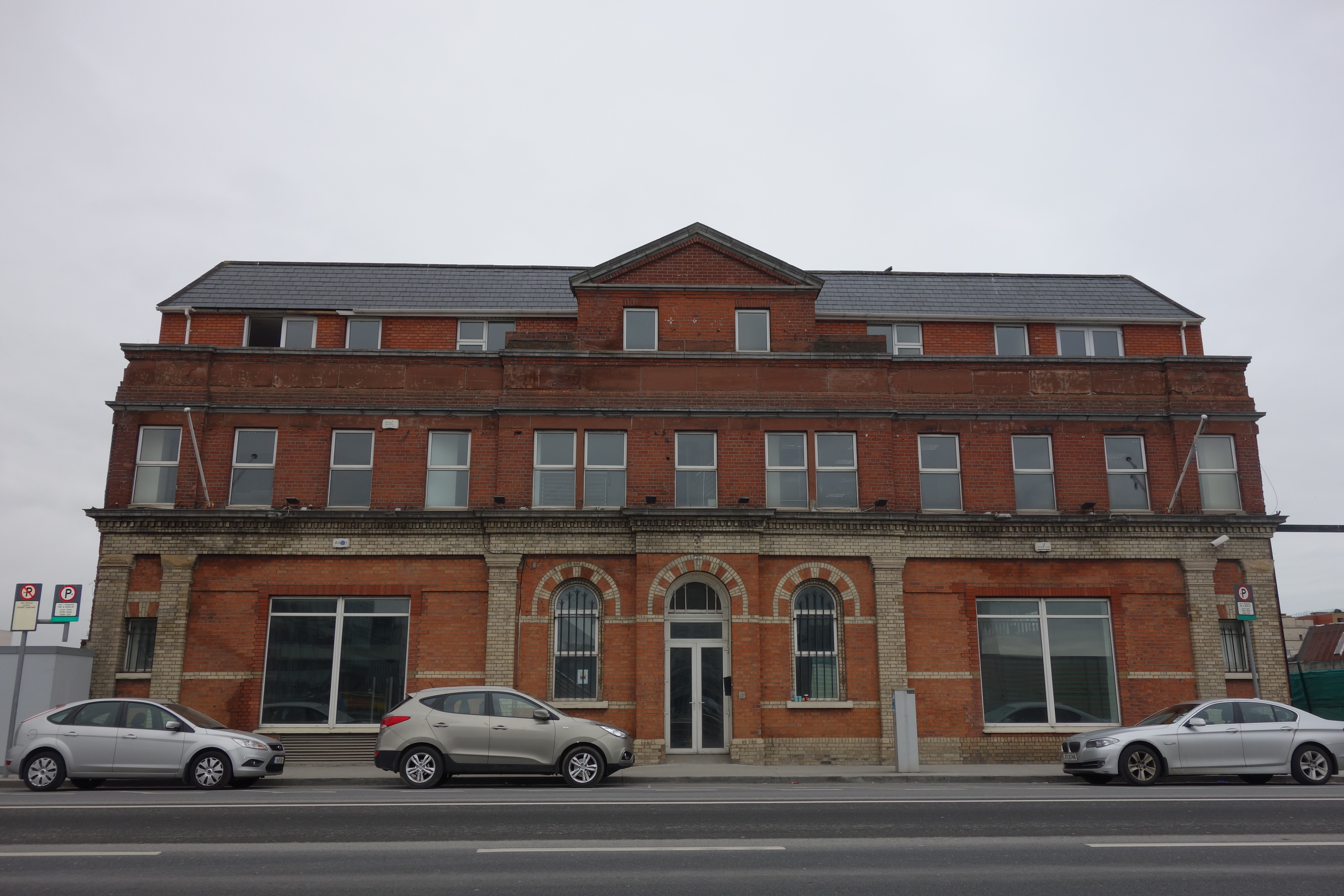
73 North Wall Quay, Dublin acquired by Paddy McKillen in 2019 with planning permission for a 10-storey office building
