= Butler Arms Hotel =

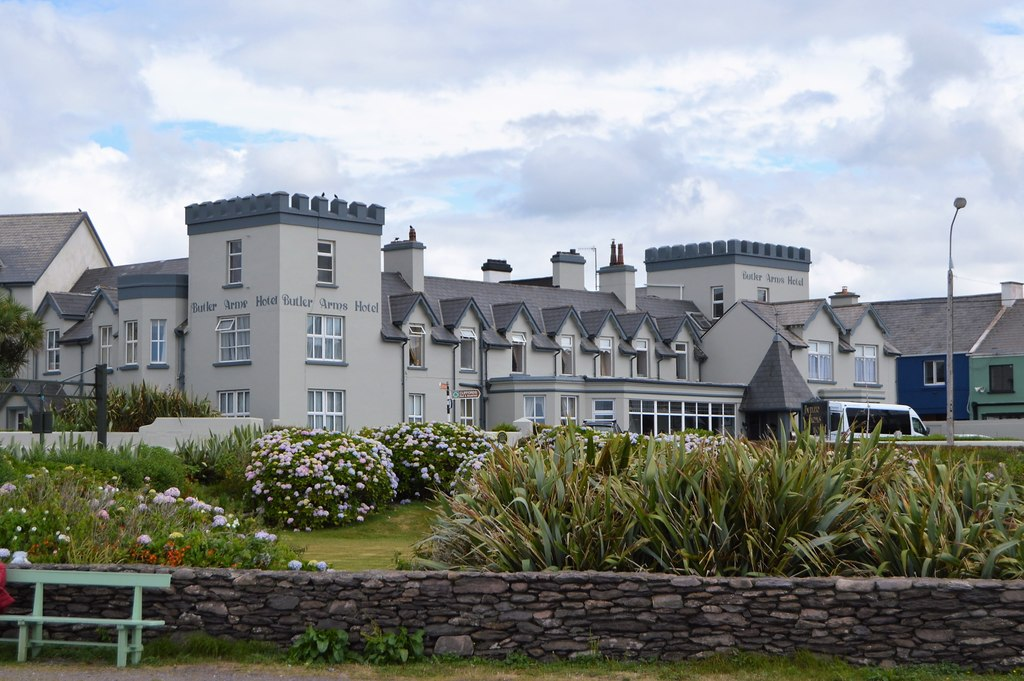
- Hotel frontage and entrance
- Interactive map of the Butler Arms Hotel area

General information
- Type: Hotel
- Location: Waterville, County Kerry, Ireland
- Coordinates: 51.8277°N 10.1723°W
- Opened: 1884
- Owner: Press Up Entertainment

Website
- butlerarms.com

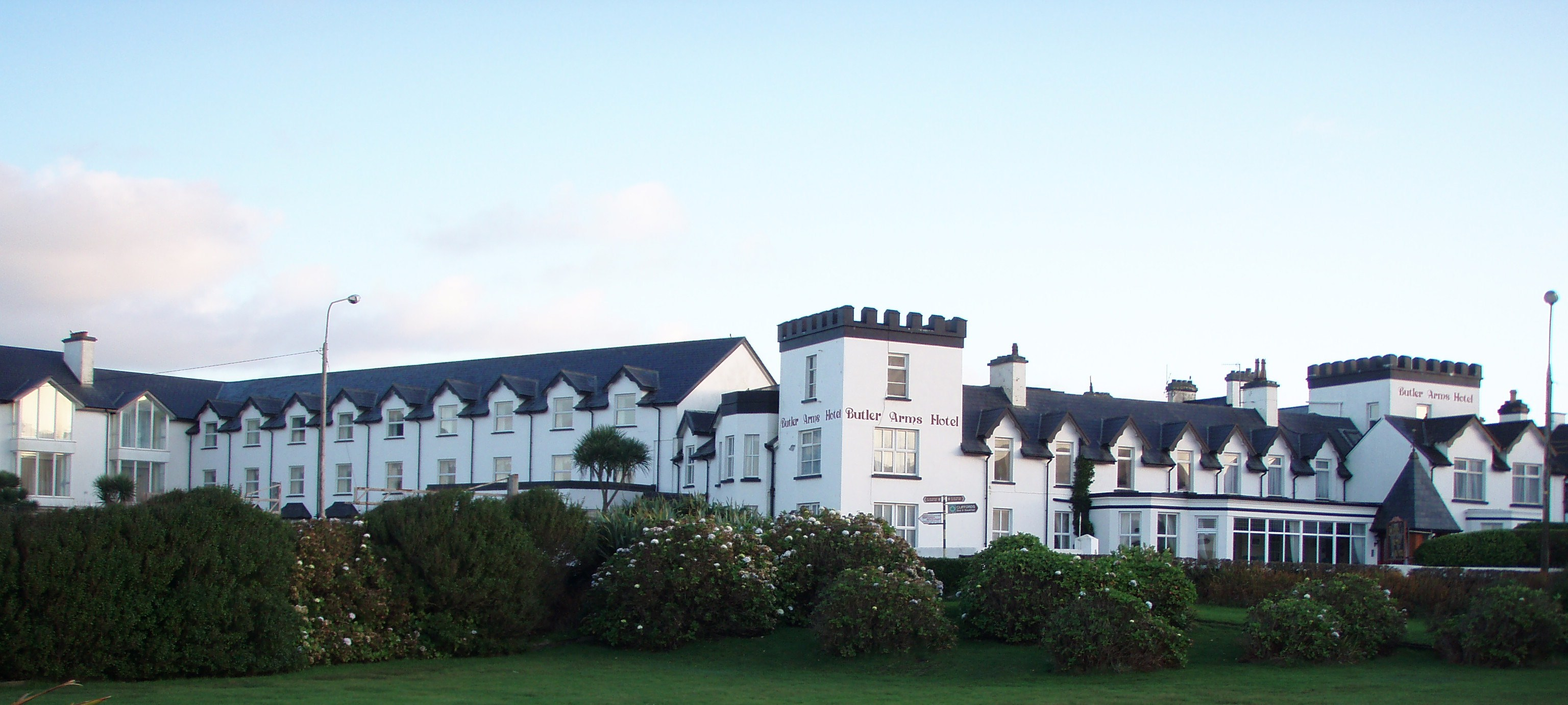
The Butler Arms in November 2011

The Butler Arms Hotel is a 19th-century hotel in Waterville, County Kerry, Ireland. The hotel, which opened in 1884, has had a number of notable guests, including Charlie Chaplin.

The hotel is located on the southern tip of the Ring of Kerry along the south-west coast of Ireland. It is close to Valentia Island, the Skellig Islands, Lough Currane and Waterville Golf Club.

== History ==
The hotel was opened in 1884 by the McElligott family. It was acquired by the Huggard family in 1915 and operated by the family, for four generations, until 2022. The Huggard family also operated the Royal Hotel in Valentia, the Caragh Lake Hotel and the Lake Hotel in Killarney.

When the Butler Arms opened in 1884, it benefited from the cable companies who had laid the first successful transatlantic cable from Valentia Island to Heart's Content in Newfoundland, as well as coming of the railway to Killarney. Bradshaw's Railway Guides also promoted the area's scenery and fishing.

The Butler Arms Hotel was acquired by Paddy McKillen Jr's Press Up Entertainment group in 2022. Following the receivership of Press Up Entertainment, the hotel returned to local ownership when it was purchased by Mulligan Club Ltd and reopened in 2026.

== Notable guests ==
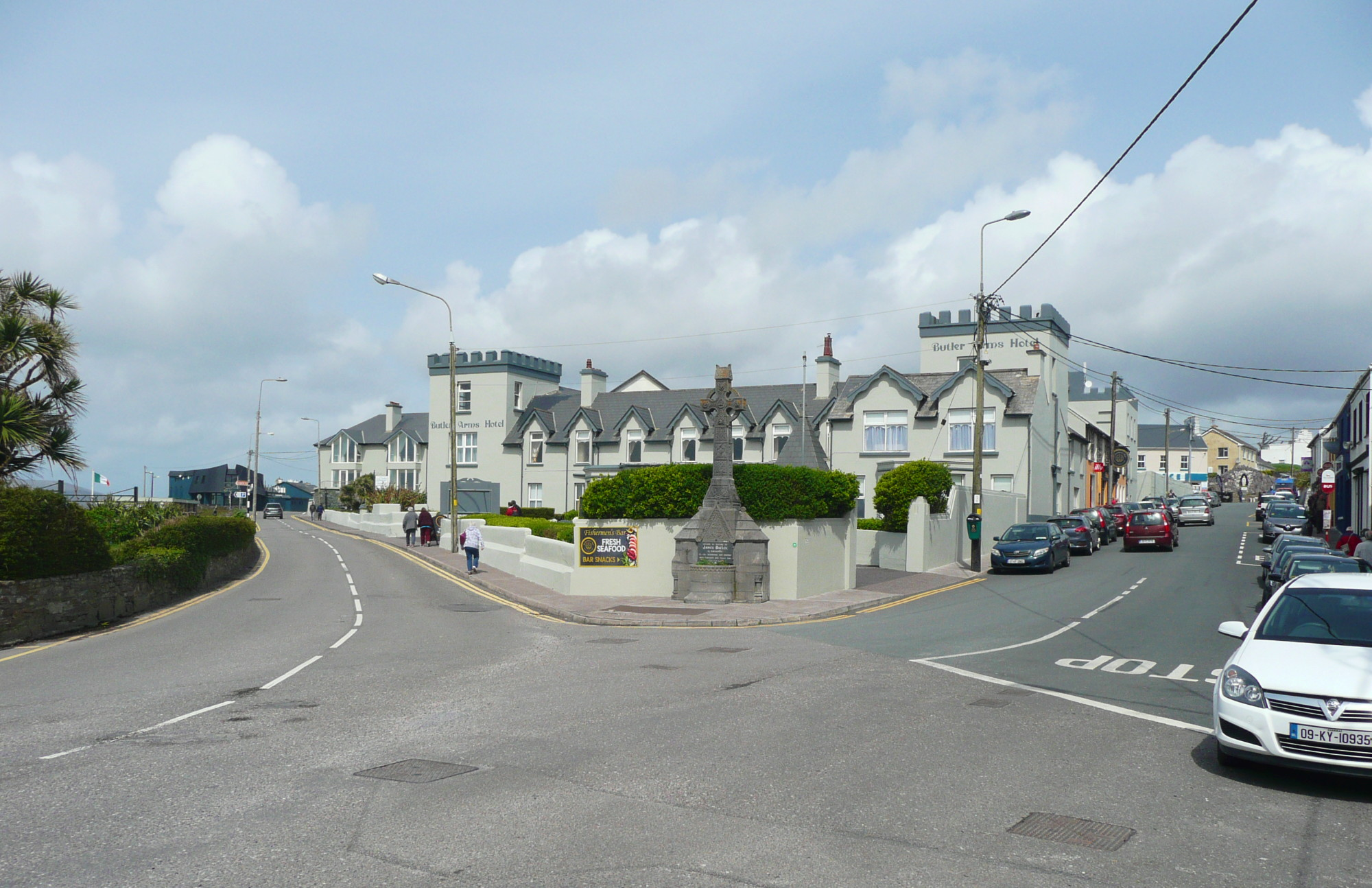
Hotel and memorial cross (1889) dedicated to James Butler of Waterville House

=== Historic guests ===
Sir Horace Plunkett came to the hotel twice in 1891, immediately after his appointment to the newly formed Congested Districts Board.

Windham Wyndham-Quin, 4th Earl of Dunraven (Lord Dunraven), who chaired the Land Conference of 1902, was also a frequent visitor to the hotel. The American banker, J. P. Morgan, reportedly stayed at the hotel in the 1920s.

The barrister and later judge, T. C. Kingsmill Moore, stayed in the hotel in 1932 and fished on the nearby lake. The hotel features in his angling book, A Man May Fish.

=== Writers and actors ===
The hotel has also hosted Charlie Chaplin, Walt Disney, Michael Douglas and Catherine Zeta-Jones. Members of the cast and crew of Star Wars: The Force Awakens, who were filming in the area, stayed at the hotel in 2014.

Walt Disney stayed there in 1946. Travelling with Disney was Dr James Delargy, who had set up the Irish Folklore Commission, and collected folklore from Sean O'Connell in Ballinskelligs (across the bay from the hotel).

In the 1960s, business was at a peak and Charlie Chaplin and his family were almost turned away; however the owner stepped forward and gave them his private suite. The Chaplin family returned to holiday in the area on a number of occasions and stayed at the hotel several times. The Chaplin connection to the area is marked with a statue in Waterville.

A number of notable writers, such as Virginia Woolf, Alfred Perceval Graves and John Steinbeck, also stayed in the Butler Arms.

== See also ==
- List of hotels in Ireland
