= Dalata Hotel Group =

Large hotel operator in Ireland, and the UK

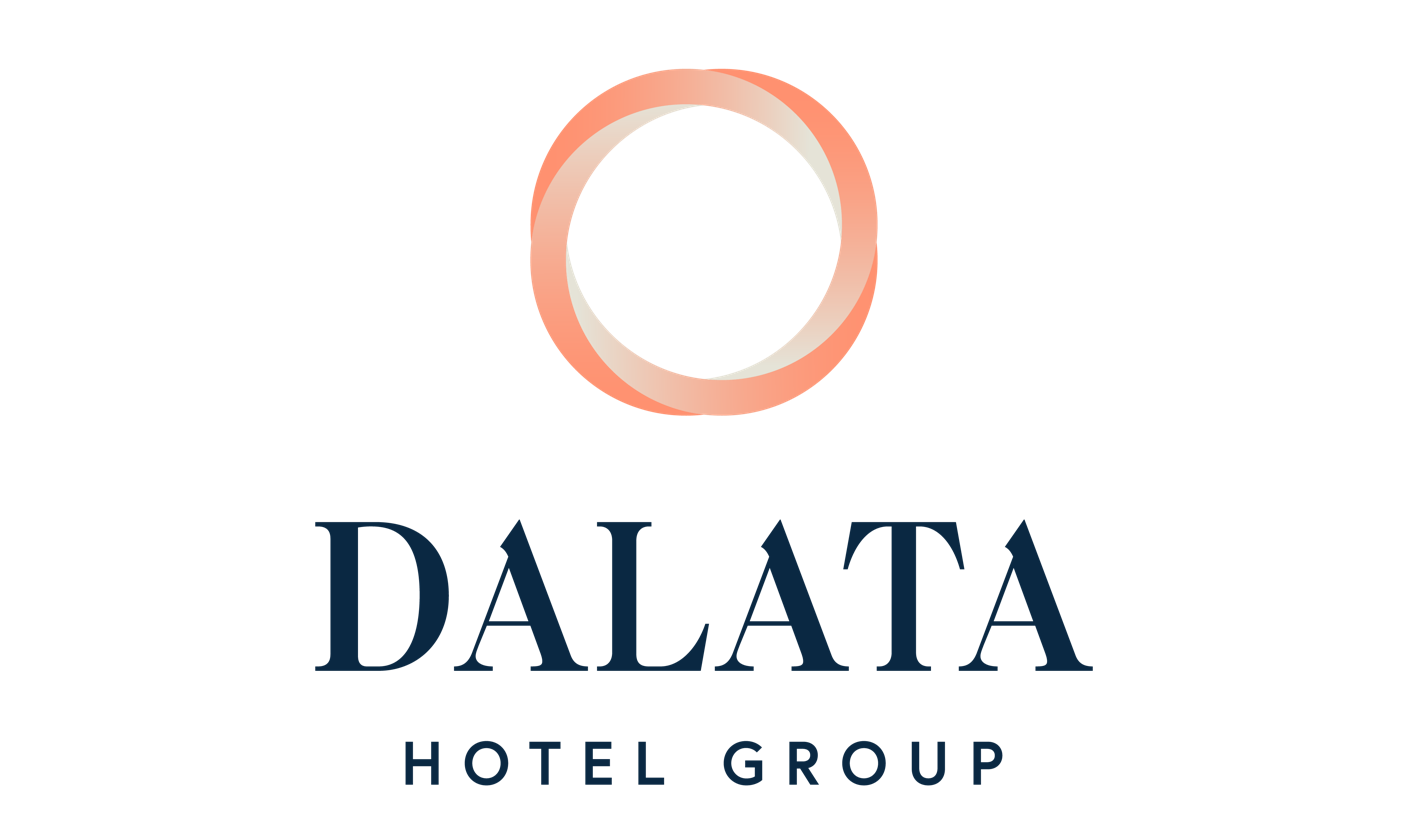
- Type: Subsidiary
- ISIN: IE00BJMZDW83
- Industry: Hospitality
- Founded: July 2007; 19 years ago
- Founder: Pat McCann
- Headquarters: Dublin, Ireland
- Owner: Scandic Hotel Group
- Website: dalatahotelgroup.com

Dalata Hotel Group is a hotel company based in Dublin, Ireland that owns and operates hotels across Ireland, Germany, the Netherlands, and the United Kingdom, mainly under the brands Maldron Hotels and Clayton Hotels. As of mid-2025, the group was operating 55 hotels.

== History ==
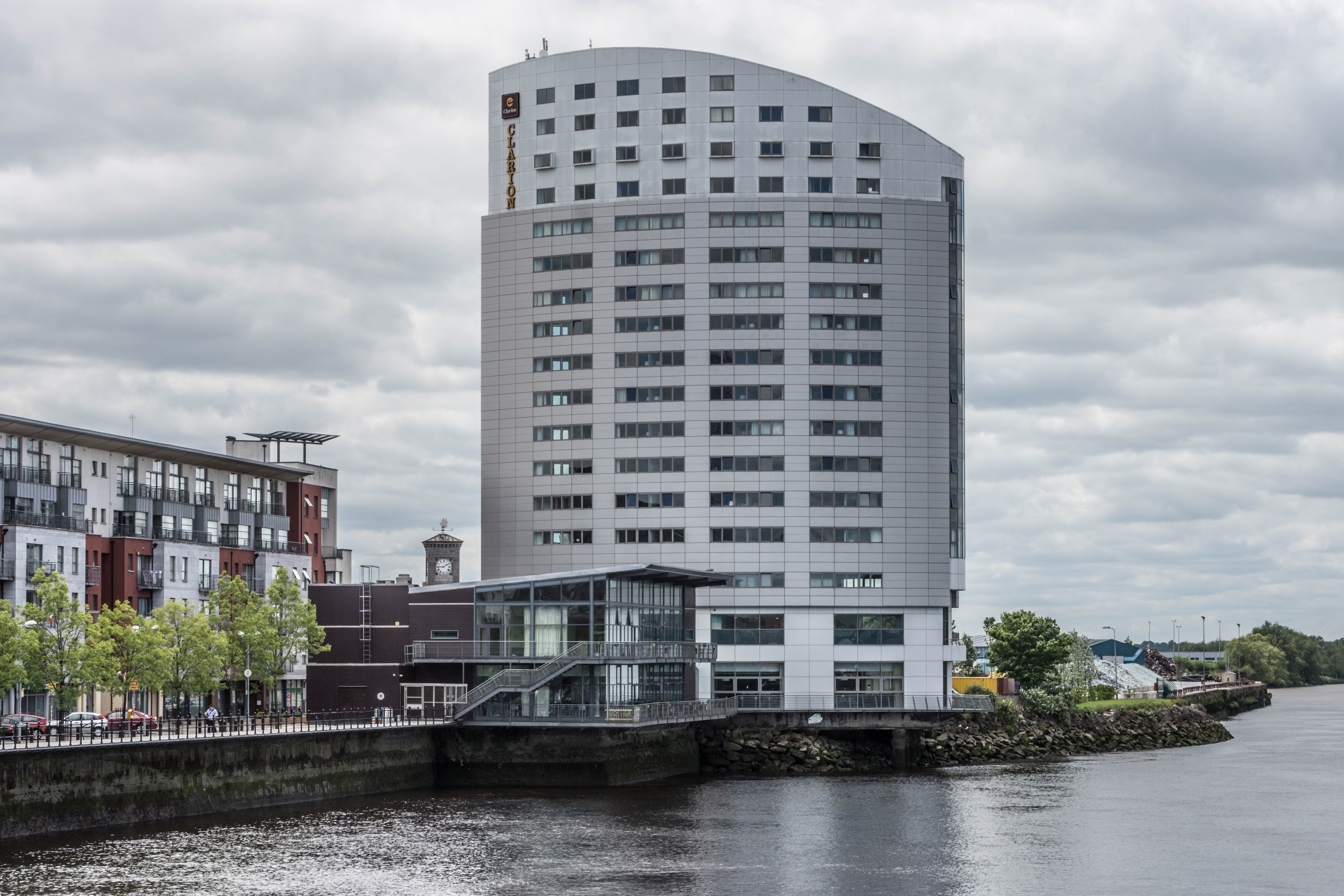
Clayton Hotel, Limerick

Dalata Hotel Group was founded in July 2007 by Pat McCann, former chief executive of the Jurys Doyle Hotel Group. The company made its initial public offering in 2014.

A major expansion occurred in 2014 when Dalata purchased nine of the ten hotels of the Moran Bewleys Hotel Group which were subsequently rebranded to the Maldron or Clayton brands. The Clayton brand name also comes from an originally independent hotel acquired in Galway in 2014. The Clayton Hotel Cork City in Cork, formerly a Clarion Hotel, was acquired by the group in 2016.

In June 2025, Dalata rejected an initial €1.3 billion takeover proposal from a Scandinavian consortium led by Pandox and Eiendomsspar, stating that the offer undervalued the company's strategic position and future growth potential. In July 2025, Dalata agreed to a revised €1.4 billion takeover by the same consortium.

In October 2025, the High Court in Ireland reportedly "sanctioned" the proposed acquisition deal. As of 30 October 2025, the acquisition was expected to become effective on 7 November 2025, following registration with the Companies Registration Office. As part of the acquisition, Scandic Hotels Group entered into a framework agreement with Pandox and Eiendomsspar to acquire the hotel operations of Dalata. In November 2025, it was announced that Pandox and Eiendomsspar had completed the acquisition of the remaining 91.2% stake in the company.

== Properties ==
As of May 2024, Dalata operated 23 hotels under the 'Maldron Hotels' brand, 27 under the 'Clayton Hotels' brand and four independently named properties in three countries. By mid-2025, the company operated 55 hotels.

Notable properties include the Clayton Hotel, Limerick, one of the tallest hotels in Ireland, and the Clayton Burlington Hotel, Dublin.

== Controversies ==
In August 2024, following the announcement of additional concert dates for the band Oasis in Manchester, several customers reported that their existing reservations at Dalata's Maldron Hotel in Manchester had been cancelled. Some accused the company of cancelling the bookings to relist the rooms at higher prices, with reports of rates increasing up to three times the original cost. Dalata attributed the issue to a technical error in its booking system that occurred on 26–27 August 2024, leading to overbooking for the affected dates. The company denied intentionally cancelling reservations to resell at inflated prices, apologised for the inconvenience, and stated it would honour all bookings made before 26 August 2024. Manchester City Council indicated it would look into the complaints.

== See also ==
- The Doyle Collection
- Jurys Inn
