= Leonardo Royal Hotel Birmingham =

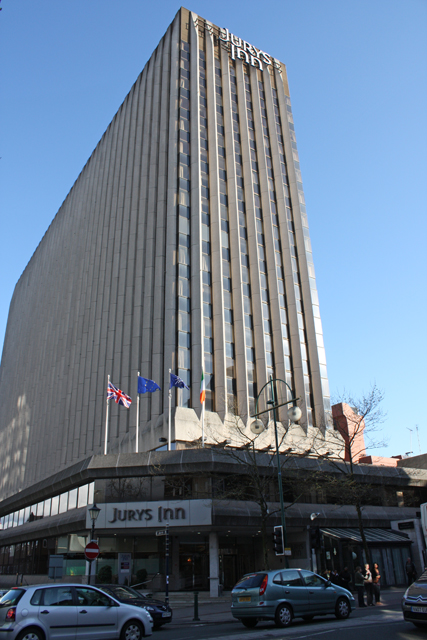
- Leonardo Royal Hotel Birmingham
- Interactive map of the Leonardo Royal Hotel Birmingham area

General information
- Type: Hotel
- Architectural style: Brutalist
- Location: Berkley Street/Broad Street, Birmingham, England
- Coordinates: 52°28′35.99″N 1°54′41.45″W
- Construction started: 1974
- Completed: 1975

Height
- Height: 61 metres (200 ft)

Technical details
- Floor count: 18

Design and construction
- Architect: Ian Fraser

The Leonardo Royal Hotel Birmingham is a hotel on Broad Street, Birmingham, England.

The concrete clad and steel joist structure was originally an office building known as the Chamberlain Tower. Construction commenced in 1974 and was completed the following year, to a design by Ian Fraser of John Roberts & Partners. It is one of the tallest buildings on Broad Street and forms a prominent part of the city skyline when viewed from the south. It is an example of Brutalist architecture in Birmingham; other examples being Birmingham Central Library and New Street Station Signal Box.

The building was converted to a hotel in 1998, at a cost of £12.5m, and opened as the Chamberlain Tower Hotel on 1 February 1999. The hotel has 445 rooms, making it one of the largest hotels in Birmingham. On the ground floor is a pub and a restaurant. It was bought by the Jurys Inns hotel chain in 2001 for £42 million and renamed Jurys Inn Birmingham. In April 2022, the Fattal Hotel Group announced that all Jurys Inn Hotels would be rebranded as Leonardo Hotels, and after renovation and refurbishment the hotel was renamed Leonardo Royal Hotel Birmingham on 19 December 2022.

== See also ==
- List of tallest buildings and structures in Birmingham
