= The Doyle Collection =

Hotel group based in Dublin, Ireland

- Formerly: Jury's Hotel Group
- Company type: Private
- Industry: Hospitality
- Founded: July 1964; 61 years ago
- Founder: Pascal Vincent Doyle
- Headquarters: Dublin, Ireland
- Key people: John J. Gallagher
- Website: www.doylecollection.com

The Doyle Collection is a group of hotels previously known as Jurys Doyle Hotels. It comprises eight hotels in five cities in Ireland, the UK and the US.

== History ==
The group's origins lie in the establishment of the South County Hotel (now the Stillorgan Park hotel) in Mount Merrion, Dublin by Pascal Vincent Doyle. He later sold the hotel to finance the development of the more upmarket Montrose hotel near Donnybrook in 1964. The group continued expanding with the development of the Green Isle hotel in Newlands Cross and then the Skylon hotel in Drumcondra in 1969 the Tara Tower hotel in Booterstown in 1970, the Burlington Hotel in 1972 and the Berkeley Court in Ballsbridge in 1978. Later in 1984 the company moved into luxury hotels with the development of the Westbury hotel which was to cater for increasing numbers of North American tourists.

In 1999, the Jurys hotel group acquired Doyle Hotels and became the Jurys Doyle Hotel Group, the largest hotel group in Ireland. It initially comprised the Jurys Inn chain of middle-market hotels as well as the Jurys Doyle properties, the former being sold in 2007.

In 2008, after divesting the Jurys Inn chain of hotels, Jurys Doyle became The Doyle Collection and announced the withdrawal of the Jurys Doyle brand. The re-branding was intended to reposition the group in the luxury hotels market, and also involved the refurbishment of nine of its eleven properties.

In 2013, The Doyle Collection sold three of its US hotels, including two in Washington DC (The Courtyard Hotel and The Normandy Hotel) and one in Boston (The Back Bay Hotel). As of 2022, the group comprises eight hotels in five cities.

== Management ==
Pascal Vincent Doyle's daughter, Bernie Gallagher, is Chairwoman of the Board of Directors. Pat King, formerly chief financial officer assumed the role of CEO in 2011. He was succeeded by Gordon Drake as CEO of The Doyle Collection in July 2022. Most recently Timur Sentuerk was appointed as CEO in October 2024.

== Properties ==
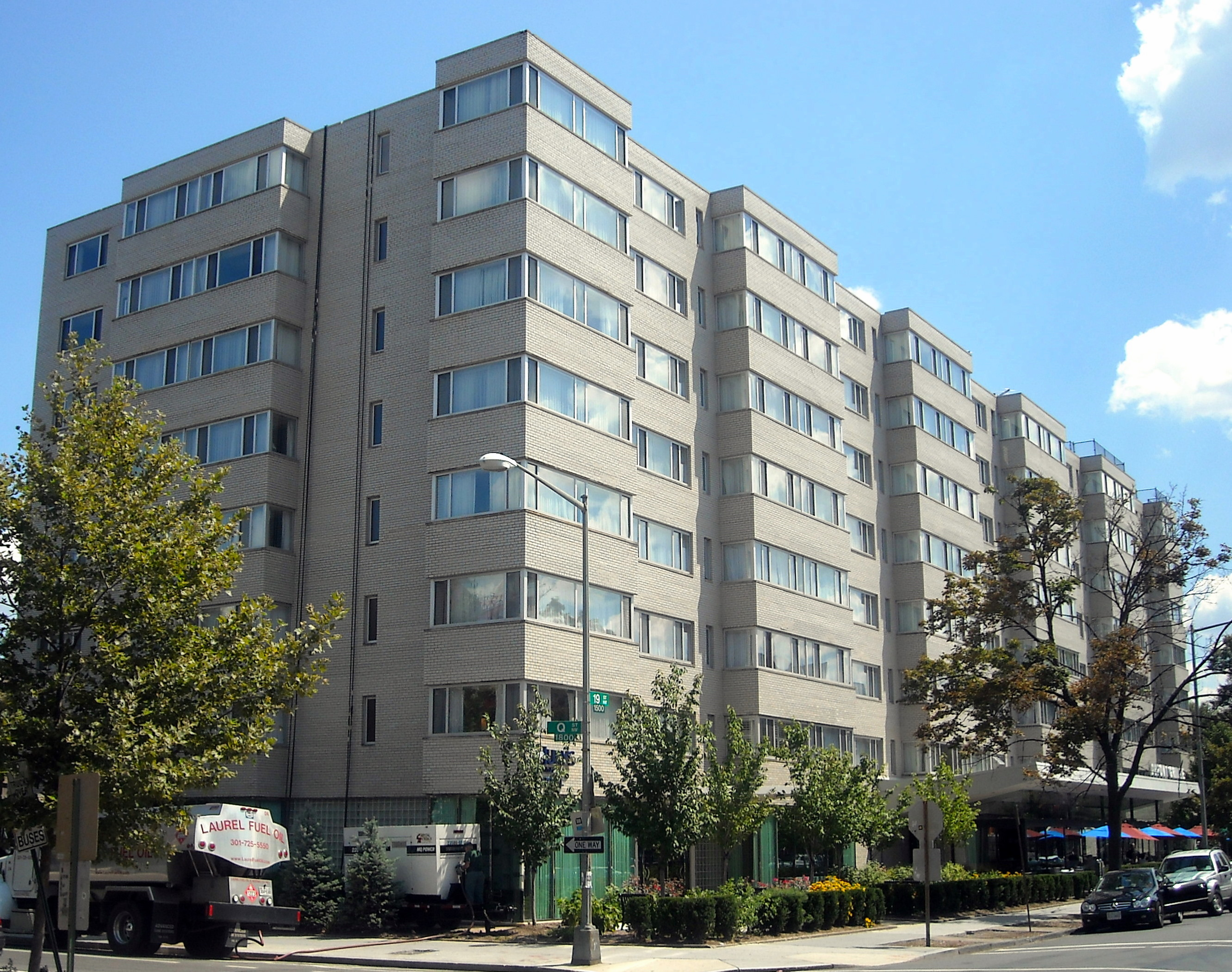
The Dupont Circle Hotel, part of The Doyle Collection

All of The Doyle Collection's hotels are freehold properties except The Marylebone, London which is on the Howard de Walden Estate, where tenure is likely to be held on a long lease.

=== Ireland ===
- The Croke Park, Dublin
- The Westbury, Dublin
- The River Lee, Cork

=== United Kingdom ===
- The Bloomsbury, London
- The Kensington, London
- The Marylebone, London
- The Bristol, Bristol

=== United States ===
- The Dupont Circle Hotel, Washington
