= Clarence Hotel, Dublin =

Hotel in Dublin, Ireland

The Clarence Hotel

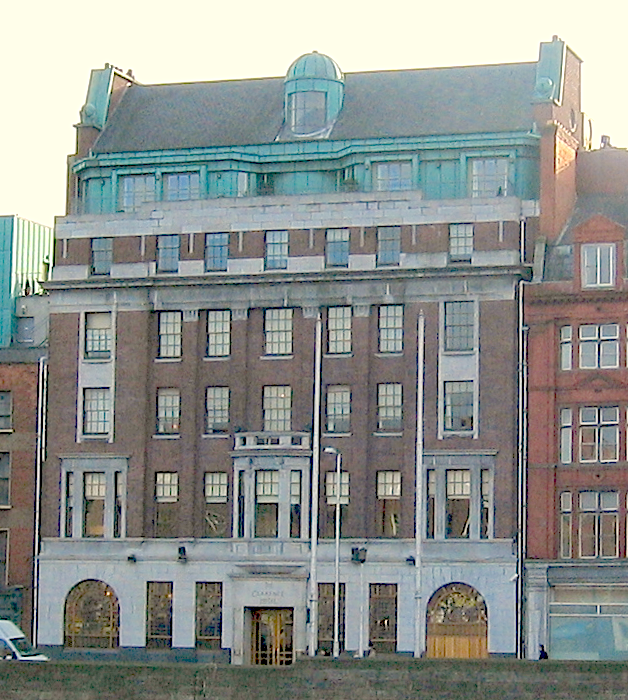
- The main façade of the hotel, November 2006
- Interactive map of the The Clarence Hotel area

General information
- Classification: 4 stars
- Location: Dublin, Ireland, 6–8 Wellington Quay, Dublin 2 D02 HT44
- Coordinates: 53.345263°N 6.266782°W
- Opened: 1852; 174 years ago
- Renovated: 6 October 1996
- Renovation cost: 8 million US dollars
- Operator: Lifestyle Hospitality Capital Group

Technical details
- Floor count: 7

Other information
- Number of rooms: 45
- Number of suites: 4
- Number of restaurants: 3 — Cleaver East, The Study and the Octagon Bar

Website
- theclarence.ie

The Clarence Hotel is a four-star 51-room hotel located at 6–8 Wellington Quay, Dublin, Ireland. It is in the Temple Bar neighbourhood, on the River Liffey. It first opened in 1852, and was bought by U2 lead singer Bono and lead guitarist The Edge together with their business partners in 1992, and opened after refurbishment in 1996.

The hotel was constructed on land that was originally reclaimed for the building of the Old Custom House around 1704.

== History ==
The Clarence Hotel first opened in 1852 in the original premises consisting of a number of adjoining quayside houses, which were replaced by the present building in the 1930s.

In 1992, Bono and U2 lead guitarist The Edge bought and later refurbished the two-star 70-room hotel, and converted it into a "contemporary boutique" 49-room hotel. The hotel re-opened in 1996 after an 18-month renovation costing US$8 million, enabled in part by a tax-exemption scheme which aimed to revive the Temple Bar district. In 2019, Bono, the Edge, and developer Paddy McKillen Sr. sold the leasehold to a company called Press Up Entertainment (owned by developers Paddy McKillen Jr. and Matt Ryan), which manages the hotel's operations. McKillen Jr. and Ryan acquired the property outright in 2023. Subsequently McKillen's Press Up Entertainment spun off of their hotel assets into the Dean Hotel Group, which then had a majority stake taken by London based Lifestyle Hospitality Capital.

The hotel's main restaurant, Cleaver East, replaced The Tea Rooms in July 2013.

== Expansion proposals ==
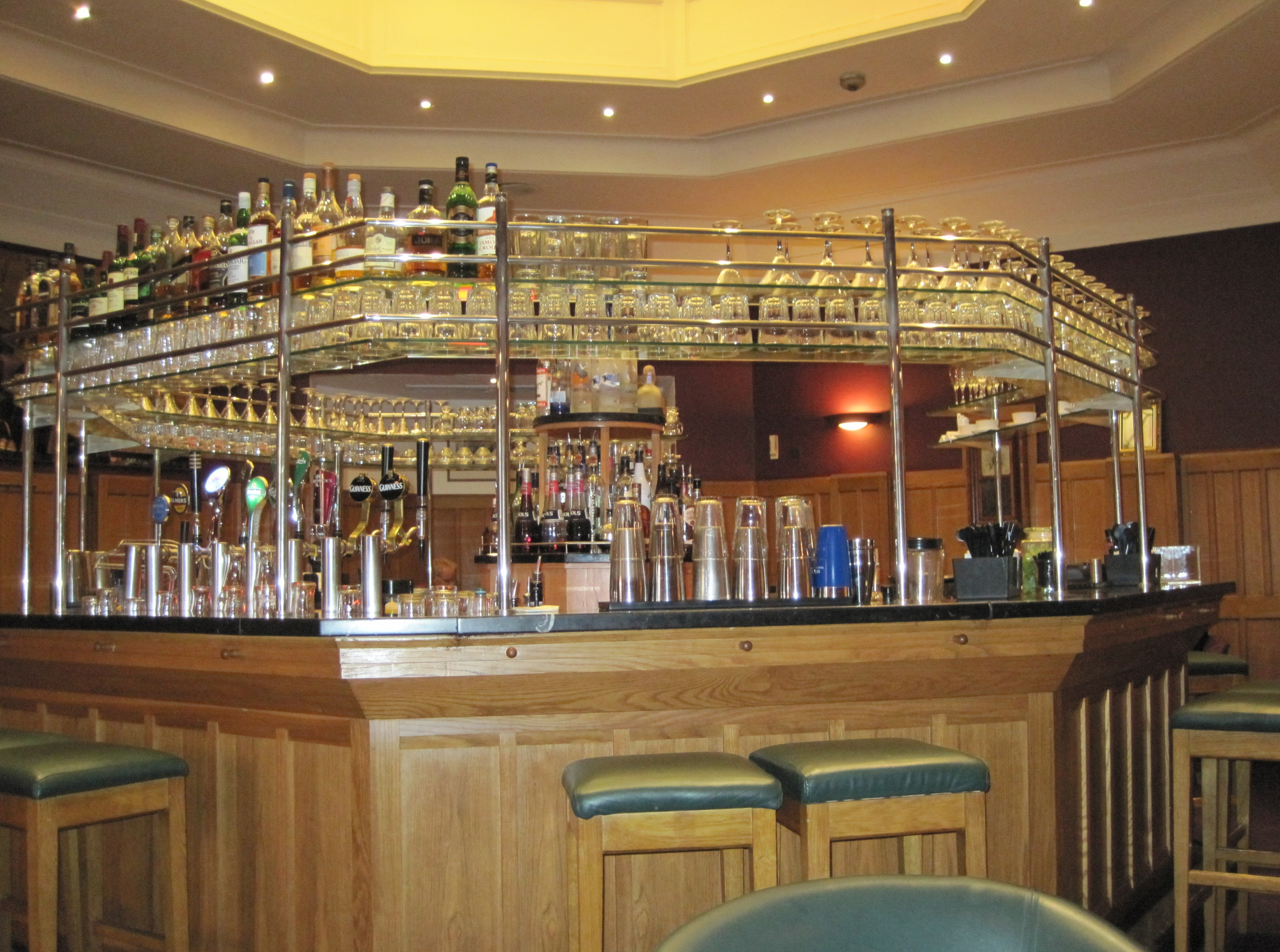
The Octagon bar at the Clarence Hotel

In 2004, plans were announced for an expansion of the hotel, which would include adjoining properties 9 Essex Street and 9, 10 and 11 Wellington Quay. All of the historic buildings would be gutted, leaving just the façades. Everything else would be new. The budget was projected at US$237.2 million. There was opposition from historic preservation groups including An Taisce, but support from some city agencies. The proposed project was approved in 2008 by An Bord Pleanála, the Irish planning appeals agency. However, the planning approval for these plans expired in 2013.

The hotel lost money during the early 21st-century recession, but returned to profitability as of 2011.

== Media ==
In September 2000, a month before the release of the U2 album All That You Can't Leave Behind, a live version of the song "Beautiful Day" was filmed on the rooftop of The Clarence Hotel for the BBC programme Top of the Pops. It is featured on the extra features of the Elevation 2001: Live from Boston DVD (although it is incorrectly labelled on the DVD as "Toronto, Canada").
