= Seán Dunne (businessman) =

Irish businessman

- Born: 1954 (age 71–72)
- Occupation: Businessman

Seán Dunne (born 1954) is an Irish businessman and property developer. He is sometimes referred to as "Baron of Ballsbridge" because of his ambitious development project for the Jury's/Berkeley Court hotels site in Ballsbridge. He left Dublin for the United States after the property collapse of 2007 to 2011. He was born in County Carlow, Ireland.

In an interview with the International Herald Tribune in January 2009, Seán Dunne commented "if the banking crisis continues I could be considered insolvent."

== Early career ==
In 1990, Dunne was involved with the development of lands at St Helens in Booterstown, Dublin through Berland Homes company, of which he was managing director. St Helens was the former headquarters for the Christian Brothers in Ireland. The main house is now a Radisson hotel. Prices for the homes at the time were priced at between £90,000 for a two-bedroom bungalow and £250,000 for a five bedroom home with conservatory. After higher stamp duty rates were introduced in September 1990, Berland was forced to reduce the price of houses by up to 10% in order to increase sales.

In 1994, Dunne along with fellow Berland directors, David Shubotham, James Burke and Frank Belton sought to build 200 apartments in the grounds of St Helens. Rebecca Jeffares of St Helen's House Preservation Group had previously prevented an office development at the site in 1992. Planning permission for the 200 apartment development was ultimately refused by An Bord Pleanala.

In March 1995, Dunne had a dispute with the fellow directors of Berland. Claims of oppression were made in a petition by Dunne, then of Torquay Road, Foxrock, and two investment companies, Sainda Limited and Ronaldsay Limited against Berland, Mulroy Securities, Whitebeam Limited, Paul Coulson and David Shubotham. Later in 1995, Dunne put houses for sale for up to £369,000 at his 18-acre site off Ballybride Road, Rathmichael. The development was for 18 homes. By March 1996, six of the homes built by Dunne had been sold. Other sites were sold to other builders.

By 1997, Dunne was involved with another 400-unit development in the grounds of St Raphael's hospital in Lucan, Dublin. In May 1997 Dunne bought Woodtown Manor and 150 acres in Rathfarnham, Dublin from Guinness heir Garech Browne for around £1.4m. Later the same year, Dunne put Grattan House, Grand Canal Street, Dublin up for sale. The asking price was £6.5 million, with the property leased at the time by the Office of Public Works for £547,500 per year. Dunne had bought the property in December 1996 for £5m.

In late 1997, Dunne was involved with the Anna Livia Consortium, which hoped to win the competition to build a national conference centre at Grand Canal Dock. The Convention Centre Dublin was ultimately developed by Treasury Holdings at Spencer Dock. The same year, Dunne through Mountbrook Homes and Sean Mulryan through Ballymore properties, bought a 100-acre site south of Greystones, County Wicklow. In 2002 they received planning permission for 1,340 homes, pushing the value of the land to an estimated £140m. They also owned a neighbouring 100-acre site which was earmarked for commercial development.

By 1999, Dunne had expanded into the UK. His building firm, Mountbrook Homes, bought the freehold of a 30,615sq ft office building at Walton-on-Thames, Surrey for £9.3 million.

== Ballsbridge purchase ==
Dunne is sometimes referred to as "Lord Ballsbridge" or "Baron of Ballsbridge" because of his ambitious development project in Ballsbridge, Dublin. Dunne was accused of recklessness for spending €379m on a property deal in the prosperous Dublin 4 section of Dublin in 2005, an amount unprecedented by historical Irish standards at the time of the deal.

The purchase was funded by Icelandic bank Kaupthing and Ulster Bank. Kaupthing lent Dunne £84.1m through DCD Builders, according to documents leaked to WikiLeaks in 2009. Ulster Bank lent the developer €326.5m for the site. Ulster Bank is not involved with the National Asset Management Agency. Kaupthing valued the sites at €520m according to the documents – Sean Dunne also personally guaranteed €250m.

Dunne's plans to build Ireland's tallest building, a Dubai-style office tower in the shape of a diamond with a one-billion euro price tag created a political tug-of-war in Irish society between those who saw it as a blot on the traditional Irish architectural landscape, represented by 37 separate political groups, and those who saw it as a welcome sign of modernity, represented by 90 groups who have filed appeals on Dunne's behalf. Although Dunne's high rise development was approved by the planning authority, An Bord Pleanála, the decision was appealed and rejected on 30 January 2009.

In September 2011, An Bord Pleanála approved a heavily modified planning application for the Ballsbridge sites. The permission granted included the demolition of the old hotels, operating as D4Hotels, and the construction of 490 apartments. A hotel and healthcare facility were also planned. The 27,000 sq m of retail space proposed in the original €50m and Dunne has said that any works to redevelop the site would not commence until at least 2017.

== Connecticut property ==
As of November 2010, Seán Dunne faced difficulties regarding a multi-million dollar property in an exclusive estate in Greenwich, Connecticut. US officials ordered work on the property to cease as the owners have exceeded the scope of their planning permission. Sean Dunne publicly denies any claim to the property in question.

In July 2011, the National Asset Management Agency (NAMA) appointed receivers to some properties controlled by Dunne. One of the properties included in the receivership is Hume House in Ballsbridge, which he bought in 2006 for €130 million.

As of March 2012, Dunne faced the prospect of bankruptcy after he agreed to court orders directing him to repay more than €185 million to the National Asset Management Agency. In 2013, Dunne filed for Chapter seven bankruptcy in the state of Connecticut in the United States where he has been resident since the failure of his development in Ballsbridge. Dunne lodged the action on Friday, 29 March 2013; he estimated his assets at between EUR 777 786 and EUR 7.77 million EUR, whilst his liabilities exceed EUR 390 million. His creditors could thus receive as little as two percent of what he owes them. Dunne commented, "I can always say to anyone that we did our best and came up short but now we move on".

== Political donations ==
In 1998, Dunne emerged as the single biggest donor to Fianna Fáil for 1997. Two cheques, totaling £80,250 were declared to the Public Offices Commission. The donations were made between May and December 1997 by Dunne's DCD Builders, just after Fianna Fáil were elected into power in the 1997 General Election. £10,000 of the donation had indirectly come from estate agent Fintan Gunne. In 1999, two additional donations were made by DCD builders, one for £5,080 and another for £1,270. In 2000, Dunne declared a £500 donation to Fianna Fáil after a golf classic.

== Personal life ==
In 2004, Dunne married Sunday Independent gossip columnist Gayle Killilea, whom he met at the Galway Races in 2002. The wedding was noted for both its attendees and its expense, which was believed to be in the region of €1.5 million. The wedding took place on board the Christina O, a yacht once owned by Aristotle Onassis. Attendees were reported to include Karen Millen, Michael Colgan, Michael Fingleton, Ronan O'Gara, John Mara, Claire Murphy, Paul and Mick Mehigan. During the wedding speeches, then Finance Minister Charlie McCreevy called the yacht, along with then Taoiseach, Bertie Ahern. It was reported Ahern said: "Dunner, you and I go back a long way... I'm sorry I couldn't come but I would have been more trouble to you than I'd be worth."

His adult son John Dunne is the director of Yesreb, an organization also associated Sean Dunne.

According to documents leaked to WikiLeaks from Icelandic Bank Kaupthing, Dunne paid $2.75m with a loan from Kaupthing, for a 1/16th stake in a Gulfstream Jet, as part of the Netjets fractional ownership scheme. This was done via an Isle of Man company called Zaskari Ltd.
