= The Dupont Circle Hotel =

Luxury boutique hotel in Washington, D.C., US

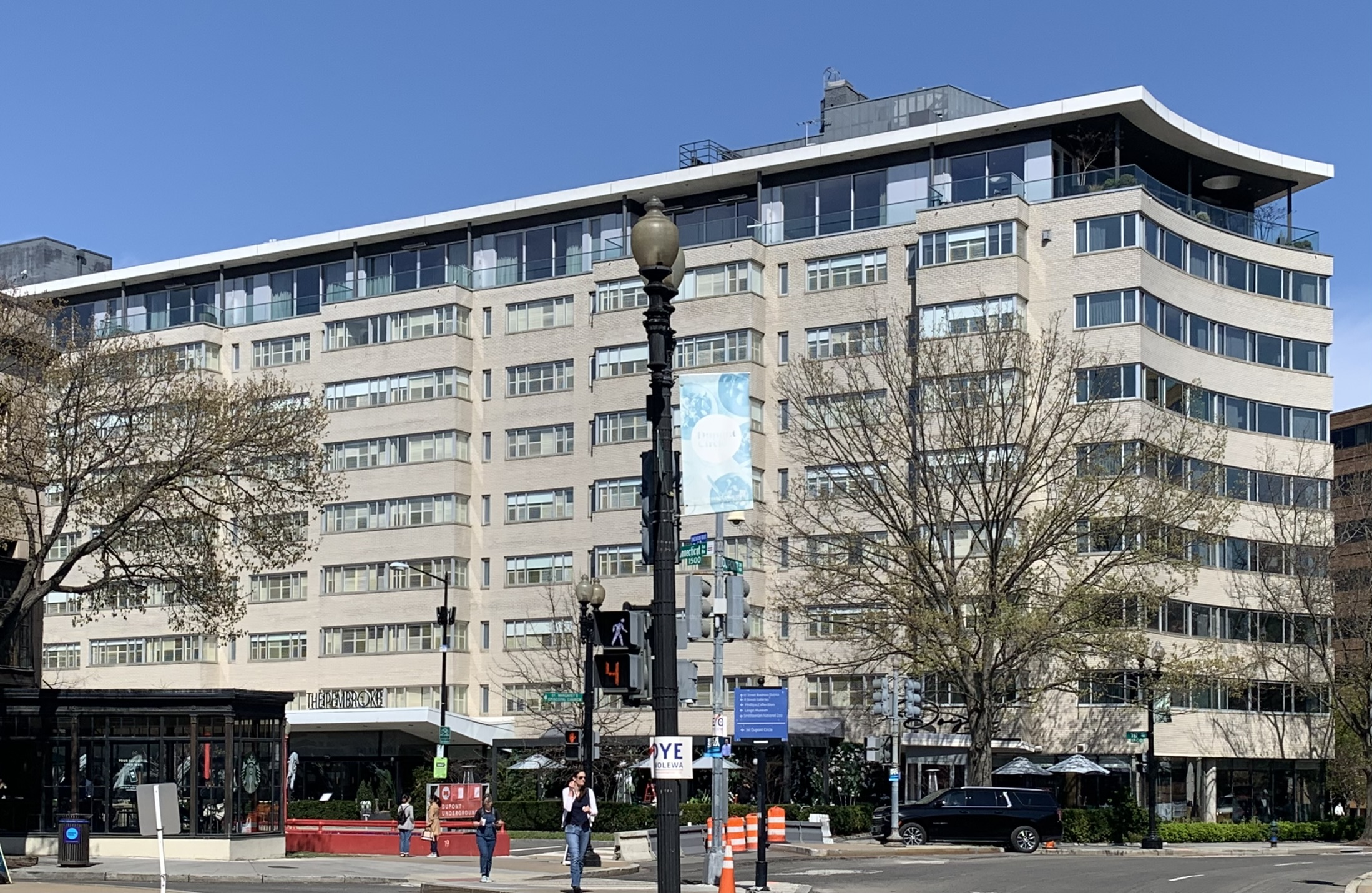
- The Dupont Circle Hotel in 2022
- Hotel chain: The Doyle Collection

General information
- Type: Hotel
- Location: Dupont Circle, Washington, D.C., 1500 New Hampshire Ave NW Washington, D.C. 20036, Washington, D.C., United States
- Coordinates: 38°54′37.6″N 77°02′35.1″W
- Opened: 1947
- Renovated: 2009
- Owner: The Doyle Collection
- Landlord: The Doyle Collection

Technical details
- Floor count: 9

Other information
- Number of rooms: 327
- Number of suites: 32
- Number of restaurants: 1, The Pembroke
- Number of bars: 1, Doyle
- Facilities: Air-conditioned, Laundry service, Pet-friendly, Room service, Child friendly, Restaurant, Fitness center, Bar and Free Wi-Fi

Website
- Official website

The Dupont Circle Hotel is a luxury boutique hotel built in 1947, overlooking Dupont Circle, in Washington, D.C.

== History ==
The Dupont Plaza Hotel opened in 1947 on the site of the demolished Leiter House. It was sold in 1997 to the Irish-based Doyle Hotel Group and renamed Jurys Washington Hotel.

In 2009 the hotel was renamed The Dupont Circle Hotel and underwent a US$50 to US$52 million renovation, adding a ninth floor containing 13 suites and a duplex Presidential Suite.

Writing in The Washington Post, Nancy Trejos applauded the hotel's furnishings and convenient location, but felt that it charged too much for some of its services. Writing in The New York Times, Fred Bernstein also praised the hotel's room design. He noted that there were "small mistakes" made by his room service.

The Dupont Hotel contains nine floors, bar (Doyle), coffeeshop (Doyle & Co), patio and a restaurant (The Pembroke). The Dupont Circle is located at 1500 New Hampshire Ave NW.
