= Cork Airport =

Airport in Cork, Ireland

Cork Airport Aerfort Chorcaí

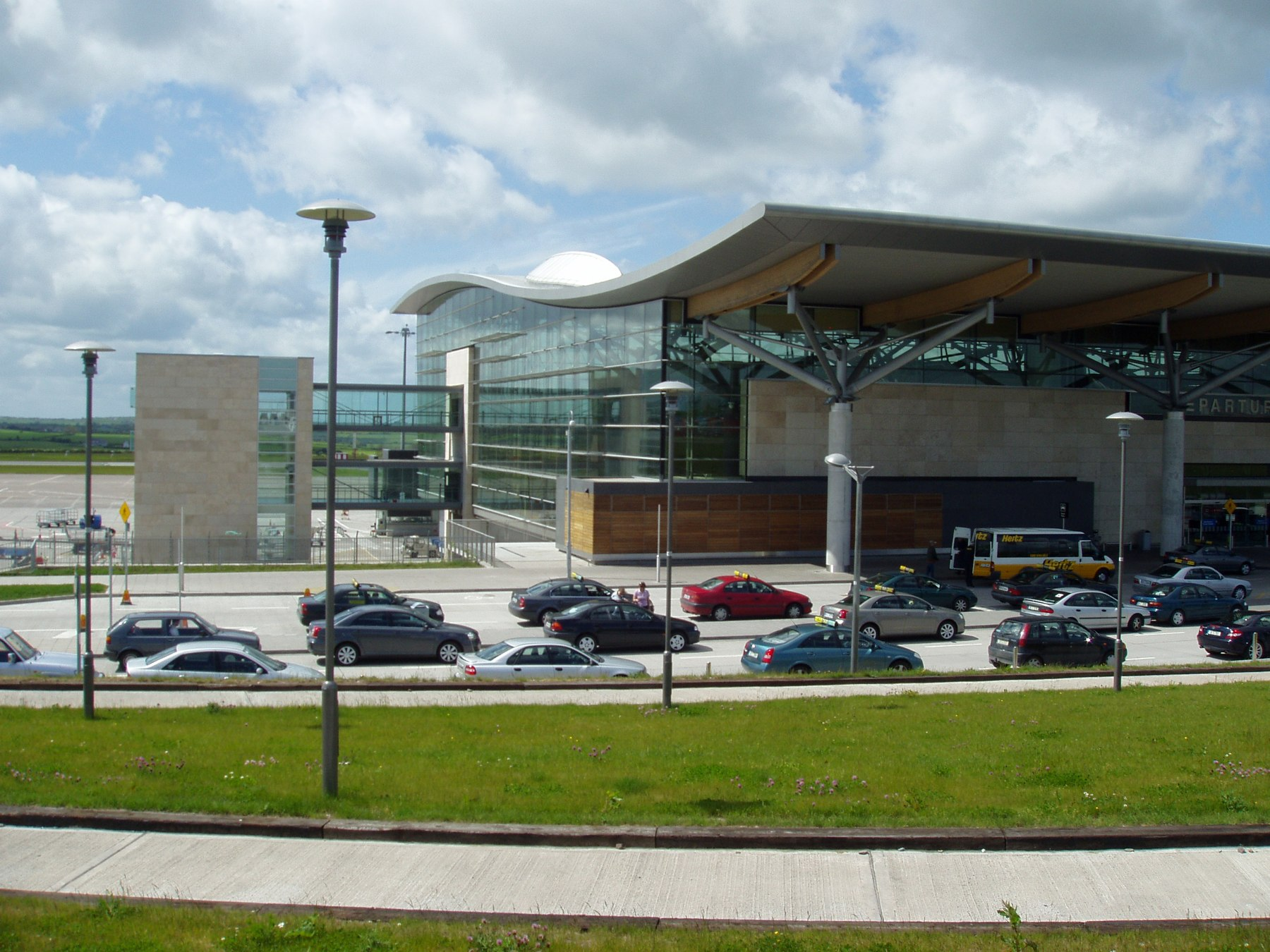
- IATA: ORK; ICAO: EICK

Summary
- Airport type: Public
- Owner: Government of Ireland
- Operator: DAA plc
- Serves: Cork, Ireland
- Location: Farmers Cross, Cork City
- Opened: 16 October 1961; 65 years ago
- Focus city for: Aer Lingus
- Operating base for: Ryanair
- Elevation AMSL: 502 ft (153 m)
- Coordinates: 51°50′29″N 008°29′28″W
- Website: www.corkairport.com

Map
- Location of airport in Ireland ORK/EICK (County Cork)

Runways
Direction	Length		Surface
Direction	m	ft	Surface
16/34	2,133	6,998	Asphalt
07/25	1,310	4,298	Concrete/Asphalt

Statistics (2025)
- Passengers: 3,460,000
- Passenger change 2024–25: ▲12.8%
- Aircraft Movements: 20,864
- Movements change 2023–24: ▲5.5%
- Location/geo data: AIS

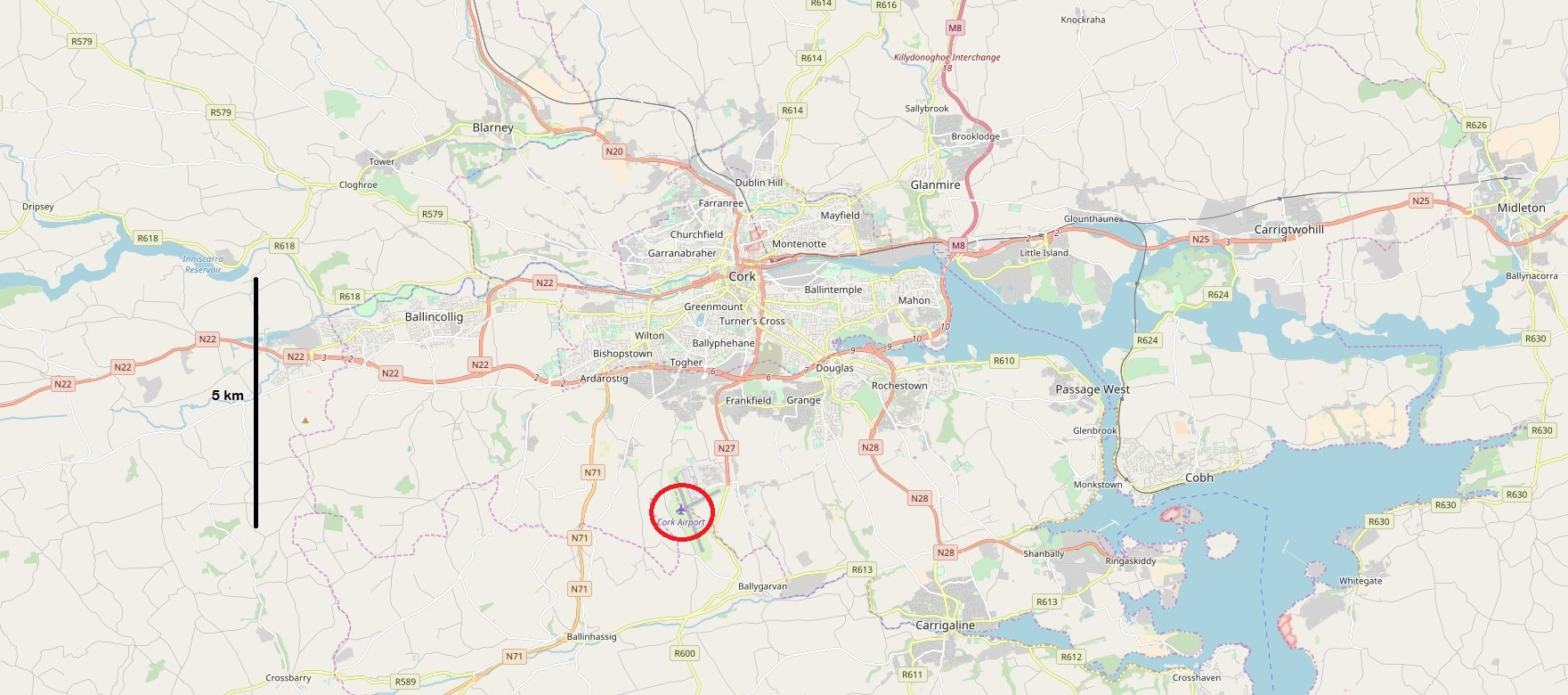
Map showing Cork Airport in relation to the rest of Cork City

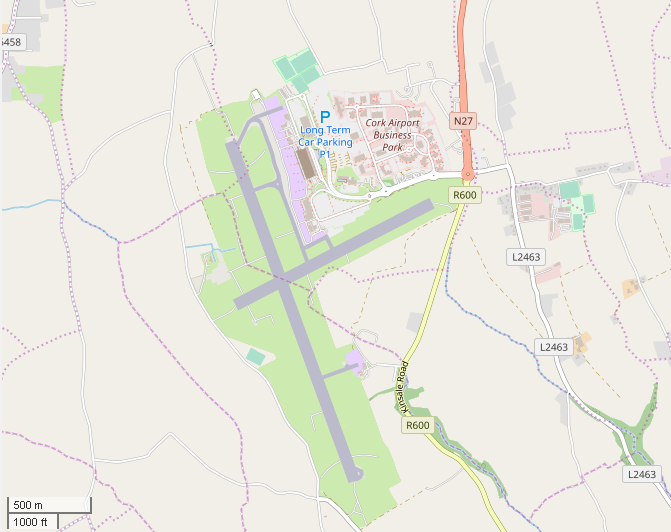
Map of Cork Airport

Cork Airport (Irish: Aerfort Chorcaí; IATA: ORK, ICAO: EICK) is the second-busiest international airport in the Republic of Ireland, after Dublin and ahead of Shannon. It is 6.5 kilometres (4 miles) south of Cork City centre, in an area known as Farmers Cross. In 2018, Cork Airport handled 2.39 million passengers, growing by over 8% to 2.58 million in 2019. Following a decline during the COVID-19 global pandemic, which saw passenger numbers fall to 530,000 in 2020, numbers had risen to 3,068,000 by 2024 and 3,460,000 by 2025.

Cork is the state's second-busiest airport in terms of passenger numbers, after Dublin, and third busiest on the island of Ireland, after Dublin and Belfast International.

== History ==
=== 1957 to 1980 ===
In 1957, the Government of Ireland agreed in principle to the building of an airport for Cork. After considering many sites in the area, it was agreed that the airport should be built at Ballygarvan. Tenders were invited for the construction of the airport in 1959 at an estimated cost of £1 million. The airport was officially opened on 16 October 1961, following proving flights four days earlier by Aer Lingus and Cambrian Airways. In its first year the airport handled 10,172 passengers – close to the average number of passengers handled each day at the airport in 2007. Throughout the 1960s the airport expanded with the arrival of more advanced aircraft and more destinations. The first jet, a British Overseas Airways Corporation Comet, landed at Cork Airport on 29 March 1964. By 1969 Aer Lingus was operating to London Heathrow, Manchester and Bristol.

In 1975, Aer Rianta, the then state airports authority, undertook a passenger terminal study aimed at improving the terminal facilities. The findings resulted in the provision, over the next two years, of new departure and arrival halls, a new check-in area, office complex, information desk, duty office and executive lounge. The new extensions and facilities were opened in 1978.

=== 1980 to 2000 ===
The 1980s began with an extension of the main apron. New services to London Gatwick began, while Aer Lingus' commuter division started a new domestic service to Dublin Airport. In 1985 following significant growth, Aer Rianta carried out a survey of the terminal facilities with a view to carrying out a major expansion and development programme. On 8 June 1987, Ryanair commenced services at Cork Airport. The following year, Phase I of the Terminal Expansion and Development Plan was completed. The following year the main runway extension of 1,000 ft (300 m) was opened.

The 1990s began with the completion of Phase II of the terminal expansion in 1991 and Phase III being completed in 1992 with the plan being brought to completion in 1994.

=== 2000 to 2010 ===
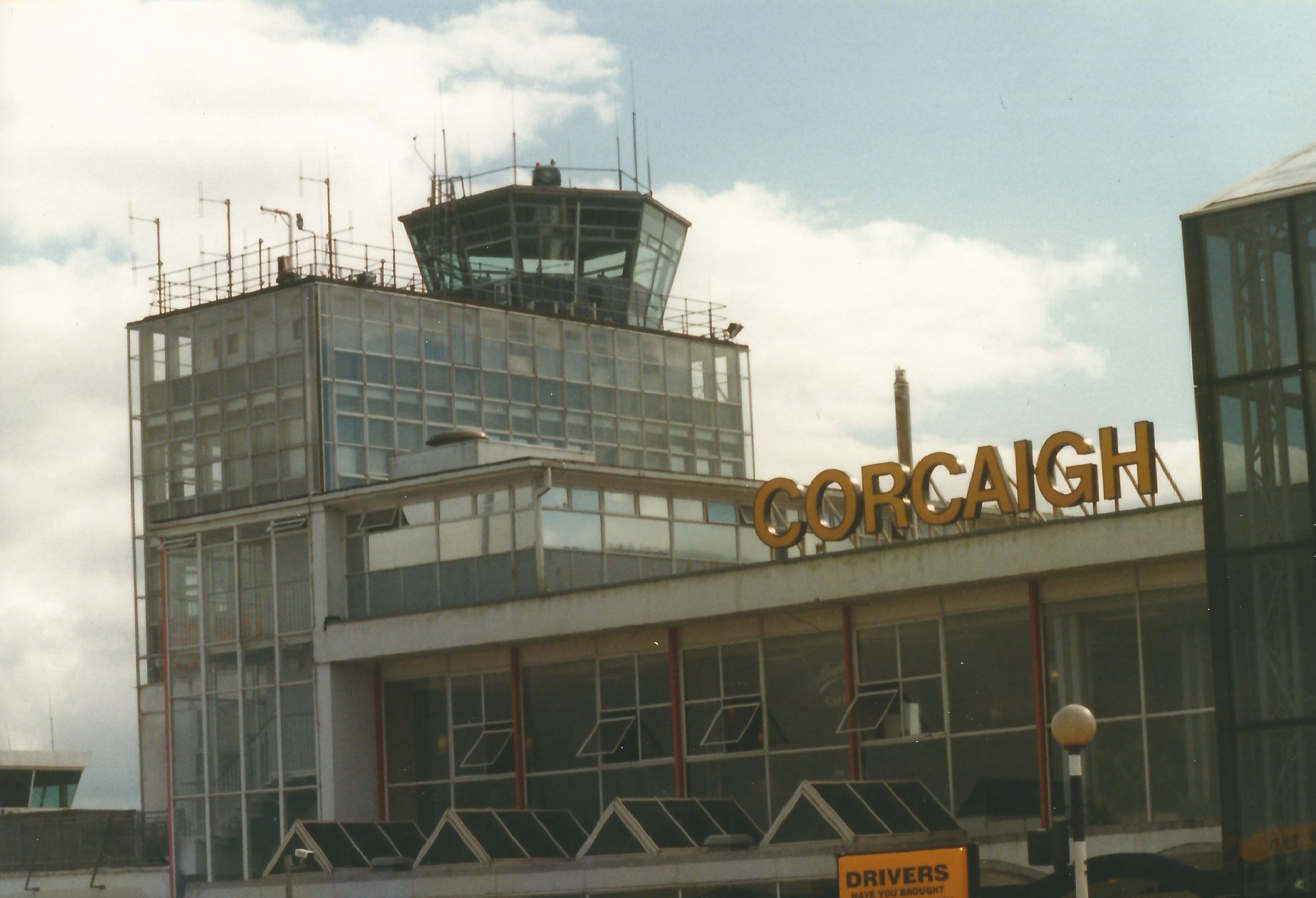
The former terminal buildings in 1999.

A Great Southern Hotel was opened on the airport grounds during 2001, and plans were drawn up for the construction of a new terminal building and ancillary capital investment works at an estimated cost of €140 million. Also towards the end of 2001, new Irish regional airline Aer Arann opened its second base at Cork opening new routes to/from the airport.

Along with the construction of the terminal, roads were upgraded from single to dual carriageway and re-aligned, and a new short term multi-storey car park was constructed. Airbridges were included in the original terminal design, however only one airbridge was built because airline representatives from the low-cost carriers who use Cork Airport made it clear that they did not want airbridges, would not use them and would not pay for them. In the circumstances, the DAA removed the airbridges from the terminal design during construction of the new facility. The new terminal was completed with four fixed links to the main building, and was designed to accommodate additional airbridges in future or if needed.

In 2005, Ryanair opened its 15th European base and second Irish base at Cork. The following year, the new terminal opened on 15 August 2006. Designed by HOK and Jacobs Engineering Group, the new terminal was the first built in Ireland in the 21st century.

In April 2008, the board of Cork Airport Authority agreed by one vote to accept responsibility for a debt of €113 million incurred by the Dublin Airport Authority in the redevelopment of Cork Airport to secure independence from Dublin Airport. This was despite government commitments that the Cork Airport Authority would be established on a debt-free basis. The Cork Airport Authority Board also stated that their strong reservations about the level of debt that Cork Airport was being levied with and the potential impact on its future sustainability. In late April 2008, Cork Airport Authority chairman, Joe Gantly, announced his resignation effective from the end of July 2008. Gerry Walsh replaced Gantly as chairman.

The Irish Aviation Authority completed a new control tower 1 km from the old terminal to the west of the main runway. The total cost was €7.5 million and was funded entirely by the IAA with no government funding. Construction began in August 2007 and was completed in June 2008 but it took until mid October 2009 to get all the new systems tested and working. The new control tower officially opened on 20 October 2009 at 00:01.

=== 2010 to present ===
On 16 October 2011, Cork Airport celebrated its 50th anniversary.

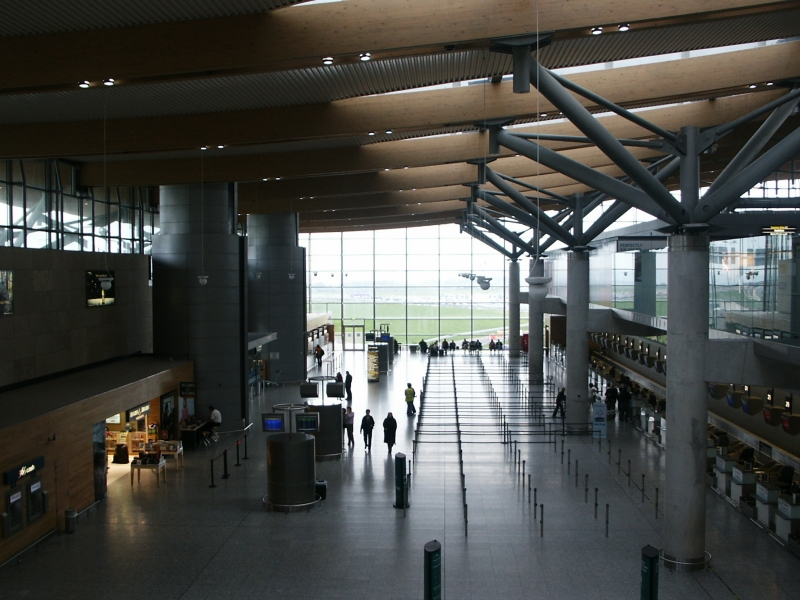
Overlooking the check-in area from level 2

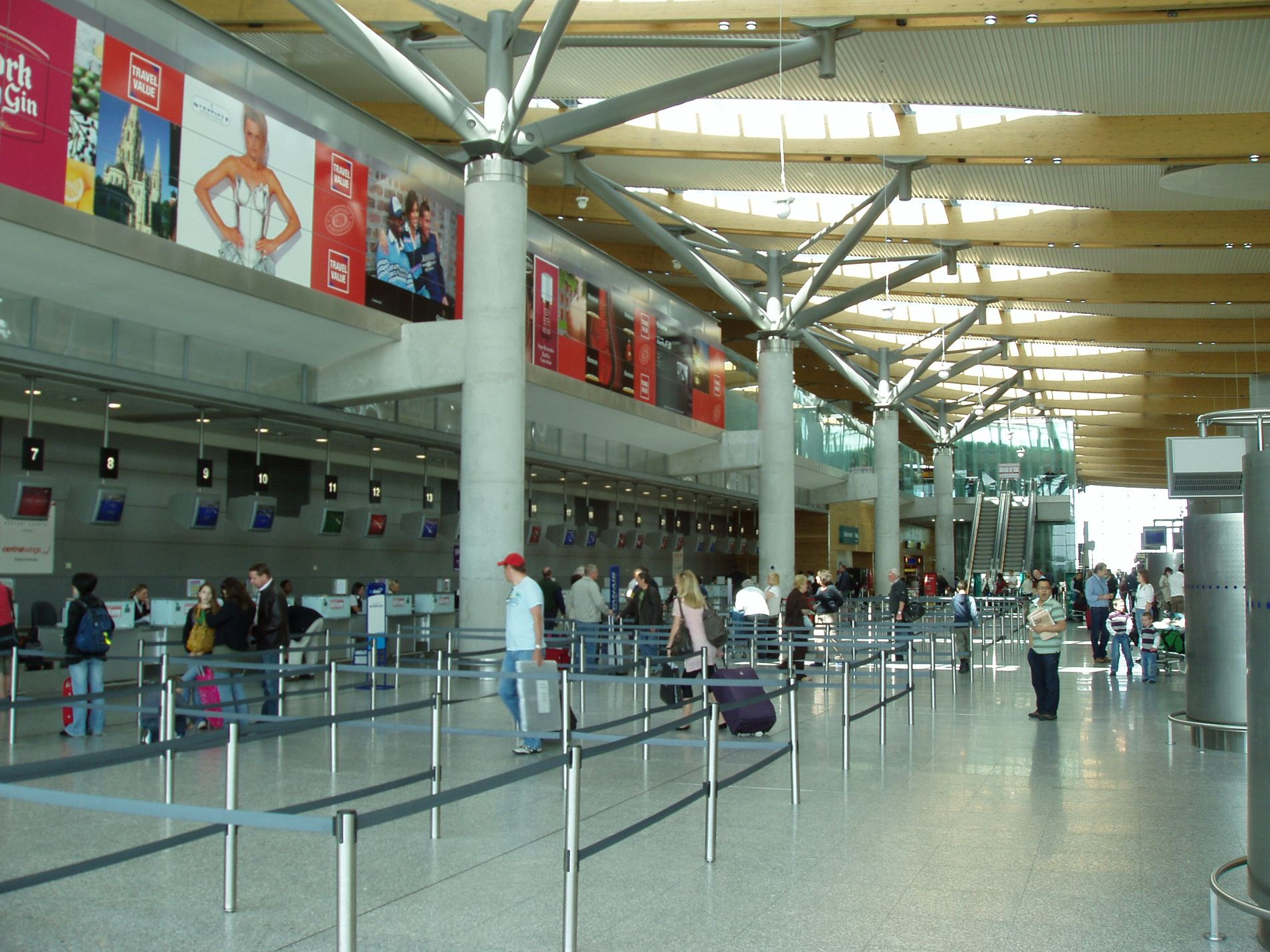
View of the check-in area at ground level (level 1)

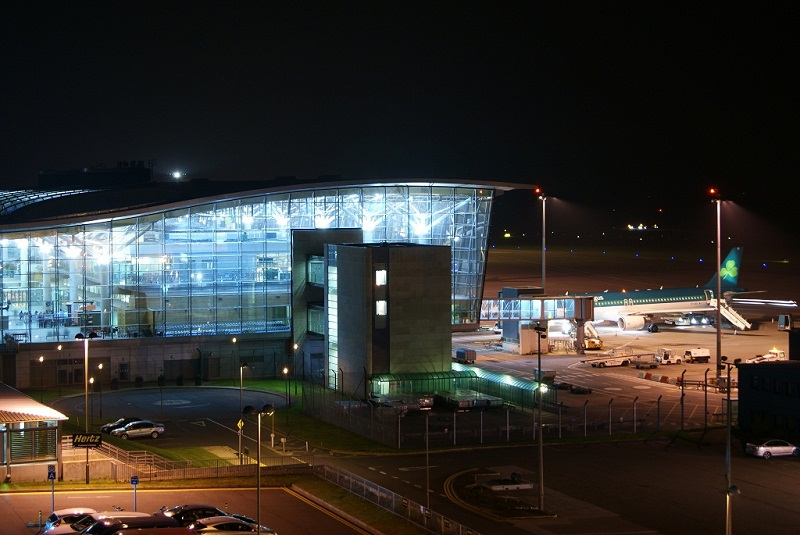
Airport at night

View of the arrivals hall

In 2014, the Airport met its public sector obligation of a 33% reduction in energy costs, 6 years earlier than their 2020 target, and were awarded first place in the public sector category at the Sustainable Energy Awards 2014.

Norwegian Air Shuttle launched a service to Providence, Rhode Island, in the United States, in July 2017. This service, which was the first transatlantic route from Cork, ended in 2019.

The airport was named as "Best Airport in Europe under 5 million passengers" at the Airports Council International (ACI) Europe General Assembly in 2017, 2019 and 2025.

== Geographical situation ==
With an elevation of 153 m (502 ft) above sea level, Cork Airport is sometimes prone to fog and a low cloud ceiling. The Instrument landing system has been upgraded to Category II, and together with a 305 m (1,001 ft) extension of the main runway has significantly reduced the number of diversions. However, during times of severe inclement weather the airport can suffer from delays or diversions to airports such as Shannon, Dublin or Kerry. Similarly, diversions from these airports occasionally land at Cork.

The length of the main runway dictates that the airport cannot handle fully laden large widebody aircraft. Large wide-bodied aircraft do visit Cork Airport on an irregular basis, for example to operate ad-hoc charter services for flights to sporting events such as those of the Munster Rugby team.

== Operator ==
From its opening in 1961, the airport was managed by the Department of Transport and Power, now the Department of Transport. Aer Rianta took control of Cork and Shannon Airports on 1 April 1969 and the assets of the airports were transferred to the company under the Air Navigation and Transport (Amendment) Act, 1998. The name of Aer Rianta was changed to the Dublin Airport Authority (DAA) under the State Airports Act 2004, which also created the Cork Airport Authority and the Shannon Airport Authority. These companies were charged with preparing a business plan in preparation for taking over the assets of their airports from the DAA.

Cork Airport is responsible for the infrastructure which enables airlines and handling agents at the airport. Aer Lingus provide their own aircraft ground handling services, while other airlines and private flights contract services to third party ground handlers (Swissport and Weston Aviation).

== Passenger facilities ==
The main terminal at Cork Airport contains several shopping and eating facilities both before and after the security screening area, a bureau de change kiosk and ATM (cash machine) and a business lounge operated by Swissport. There are eight departure gates in the airport, two of which have an airbridge.

There are two hotels located adjacent to the passenger terminal, the Cork International Hotel which is located in the business park, and the Cork Airport Hotel (previously branded Park Inn by Radisson) which is located opposite the terminal on airport grounds.

== Development plans ==
Parallel plans for transport infrastructure also exist, including upgrading the N27 to two lanes in each direction and a dedicated bus lane for city–bound traffic. The roundabout at the entrance of the airport would be enhanced with an under-pass.

In 2025, Cork Airport announced a €200m investment plan that includes a new pier and additional gates, new solar farm, car park extension and new security screening technology. The plan also requires the demolition of the old terminal and air traffic control tower. The upgrade will enable the airport to cater for five million passengers per annum.

== Airlines and destinations ==
The following airlines operate regularly scheduled and chartered flights from Cork Airport:

Airlines	Destinations
Aer Lingus	Bristol, Glasgow, Lanzarote, London–Heathrow, Málaga, Prague, Tenerife–South; Seasonal: Bilbao, Bordeaux, Faro, Geneva, Lyon, Munich, Nice, Palma de Mallorca, Santiago de Compostela; Seasonal charter: Salzburg
Air France	Paris–Charles de Gaulle
Edelweiss Air	Seasonal: Zurich
KLM	Amsterdam
Lufthansa	Seasonal: Frankfurt
Ryanair	Alicante, Barcelona, Beauvais, Birmingham, Charleroi, Edinburgh, Faro, Fuerteventura, Gran Canaria, Liverpool, London–Gatwick, London–Luton, London–Stansted, Málaga, Manchester, Seville, Tenerife–South, Valencia; Seasonal: Alghero, Bergamo, Carcassonne, Girona, La Rochelle, Palma de Mallorca, Pisa, Reus, Rhodes, Venice, Zadar
SunExpress	Seasonal: Izmir
TUI Airways	Seasonal: Palma de Mallorca (begins 18 May 2027)

== Statistics ==
=== Passenger numbers ===
Passenger numbers at Cork Airport increased every year during the ten years between 1998 and 2008 by an average of 14.8% per annum from around 1.3 million to over 3.2 million. Passenger numbers fell however during the subsequent seven years to just below 2.1 million in 2015. Passenger numbers returned to growth in 2016, with a year-on-year increase of 7.7% to 2.23 million passengers. In 2017 this number rose to 2.3 million, increasing during 2018 by a further 4% to around 2.4 million passengers. By 2019 it had increased to 2.6 million after which it suffered a drop due to the COVID-19 pandemic, along with most "other airports [..] across the world".

Year	Passengers	% Change YoY	Ref
1998	1,315,224	–	
1999	1,501,974	▲14.2	
2000	1,680,160	▲11.9	
2001	1,775,817	▲5.7	
2002	1,874,447	▲5.6	
2003	2,182,157	▲16.4	
2004	2,254,251	▲3.3	
2005	2,729,906	▲21.1	
2006	3,010,575	▲10.3	
2007	3,180,259	▲5.6	
2008	3,258,639	▲2.5	
2009	2,769,048	▼15.0	
2010	2,425,131	▼12.4	
2011	2,361,947	▼2.6	
2012	2,340,115	▼0.9	
2013	2,258,005	▼3.5	
2014	2,144,476	▼5.0	
2015	2,071,210	▼3.4	
2016	2,230,564	▲7.7	
2017	2,308,507	▲3.5	
2018	2,392,821	▲3.7	
2019	2,585,466	▲8.3	
2020	527,014	▼79.7	
2021	255,014	▼51.7	
2022	2,235,260	▲776.5	
2023	2,801,900	▲25	
2024	3,068,449	▲10	
2025	3,461,453	▲13	

=== Busiest routes ===
10 busiest international routes at Cork Airport (2025)
Rank	Airport	Passengers handled	% Change 2024
1	London–Heathrow	419,812	▲3.8
2	London–Stansted	326,835	▲4.9
3	Málaga	222,135	▲2.4
4	Manchester	218,102	▲2.7
5	Faro	201,248	▲19.8
6	Amsterdam	168,627	▼29.2
7	Lanzarote	158,334	▲27.2
8	Edinburgh	140,517	▲7.9
9	London-Gatwick	129,021	▲1.8
10	Palma de Mallorca	111,906	▲-
^{Source: Central Statistics Office}

== General aviation and business jets ==
Cork Airport has a number of services supporting general aviation flying, and also serves business jets. Both fixed wing and rotary wing flight training providers operate at the airport, with flying schools located to the south of the terminal building, on the east side of the main runway.

== Business park ==
A 9.3-hectare (23-acre) business park was developed at the airport from October 1998. As of 2026, there were in excess of 50 tenant companies in the business park, including Amazon, IBM, Intel, Poppulo and Aviva.

== Ground transport ==
=== Bus ===
Bus Éireann serve the airport on route number 225 (from Kent Rail Station to Haulbowline) and route 226 (Kent Rail Station to Kinsale). Irish Citylink also operate coach services to the airport from Galway via Limerick:

=== Taxi ===
The airport is served by taxi, with a taxi rank outside the arrivals entrance.

=== Rail ===
There is no rail link to the airport, and the nearest station is Kent Station on the edge of the city centre. There are multiple Bus Éireann routes connecting the airport to Kent Station via the city centre.

=== Car ===
Cork Airport is located 7.5 kilometres (4.7 mi) from the city centre. It is connected to the city centre via the N27 and N40. The R600 connects the airport to the port town of Kinsale, which forms part of the Wild Atlantic Way tourist route. The airport is approximately 260 kilometres (160 mi) away from Dublin and 107 kilometres (66 mi) from Limerick, accessed via the M8 and N20 respectively. DAA operates all car parks at the airport, with both short-term and long-term parking within the campus and over 4,600 spaces in total. A number of companies offer car-hire in the arrivals hall of the terminal building.

== Accidents and incidents ==
- On 10 February 2011, a Fairchild SA 227-BC Metro III owned by the Spanish airline Air Lada registered EC-ITP, was operating a scheduled flight under the AOC of Flightline S.L for the ticket seller Manx2. The flight NM7100 was operating from Belfast-City to Cork with ten passengers and two crew. At 09:50 hrs during the third attempt to land at Cork Airport in low visibility conditions, control was lost and the aircraft impacted the runway. The aircraft came to a rest inverted in soft ground to the right of the runway surface. Post impact fires occurred in both engines which were quickly extinguished by the Airport Fire Service (AFS). Six persons, including both pilots, were fatally injured. Four passengers were seriously injured and two received minor injuries.
- On 22 May 2011, at around 16:30 a man entered a Garda Síochána vehicle in Cork City Centre and slashed the Garda in the vehicle with a knife. The Garda jumped from his vehicle and the man hijacked it, hitting a number of vehicles while driving to Cork Airport. At approximately 16:50 the vehicle rammed through a perimeter airport fence, before breaking down. The man abandoned the Garda vehicle and, again producing a knife, hijacked an Airport Fire Service vehicle. By this time Air Traffic Control had suspended all operations. The man drove erratically on the airport taxiway, driving underneath a stationary Thomas Cook aircraft at high speed. The man proceeded to ram several Garda and airport vehicles, before attempting to ram an Aer Lingus aircraft. The hijacked vehicle stalled, halting a short distance from the Airbus A320. Armed Gardaí subdued the man with a taser. Flights were resumed after the man was removed and the airport perimeter secured.
