= Press Up Entertainment =

Hotel, Restaurant and Bar group based in Dublin, Ireland

Eclective Hospitality Group
- Company type: Private
- Industry: Entertainment and hospitality
- Founded: 2009
- Headquarters: Dublin Ireland
- Key people: Paddy McKillen, Jr., Matt Ryan
- Revenue: €57.8m (2017)
- Number of employees: 850 (2025)
- Parent: Cheyne Capital Management
- Website: eclective.ie

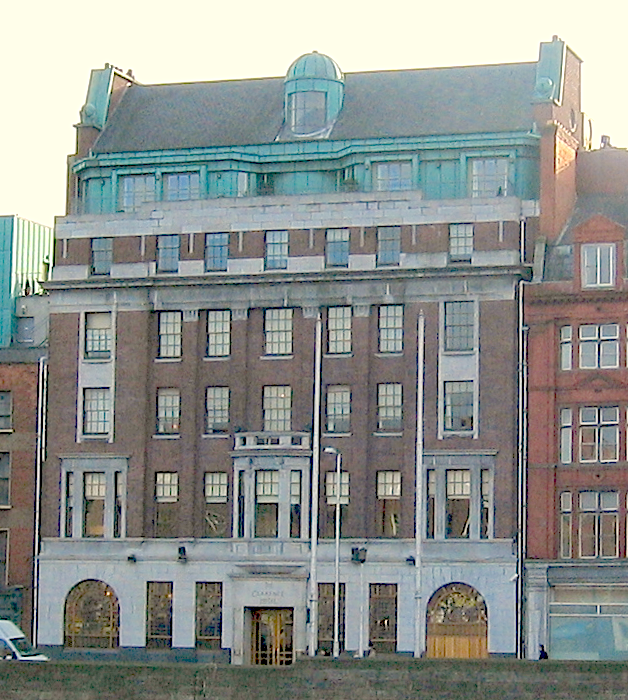
Clarence Hotel, Dublin

Eclective (formerly Press Up Hospitality Group) is a cinema, hotel, pub, retail and restaurant operator based in Dublin, Ireland. Ownership is shared between Paddy McKillen Jr., son of Paddy McKillen, and Matt Ryan.

Their properties include the Clarence Hotel, the Dean Hotel, the Dean Hotel Cork, the Devlin Hotel, the Mayson Hoteland the Stella Theatre cinema chain. They also operate two formerly franchised Tower Records locations, which have outlasted the US-based parent chain by many years. Until 2024 they also held the Irish franchise for Wagamama

A number of their new properties are located in new developments by Oakmount, a property developer with the same owners but operated independently.

In 2019 they announced the development of a bowling alley at Dundrum Town Centre.

The company investigated an initial public offering in 2018, but this was cancelled in 2019.

In July 2022, it was announced that Press Up would open its first UK venue after converting the listed Methodist Central Hall, Birmingham into a 150 bedroom hotel and event space.

In early 2025 the company restructured its operations and rebranded as Eclective.
