= Burlington Hotel (Dublin) =

Hotel in Dublin, Ireland

Clayton Hotel Burlington Road
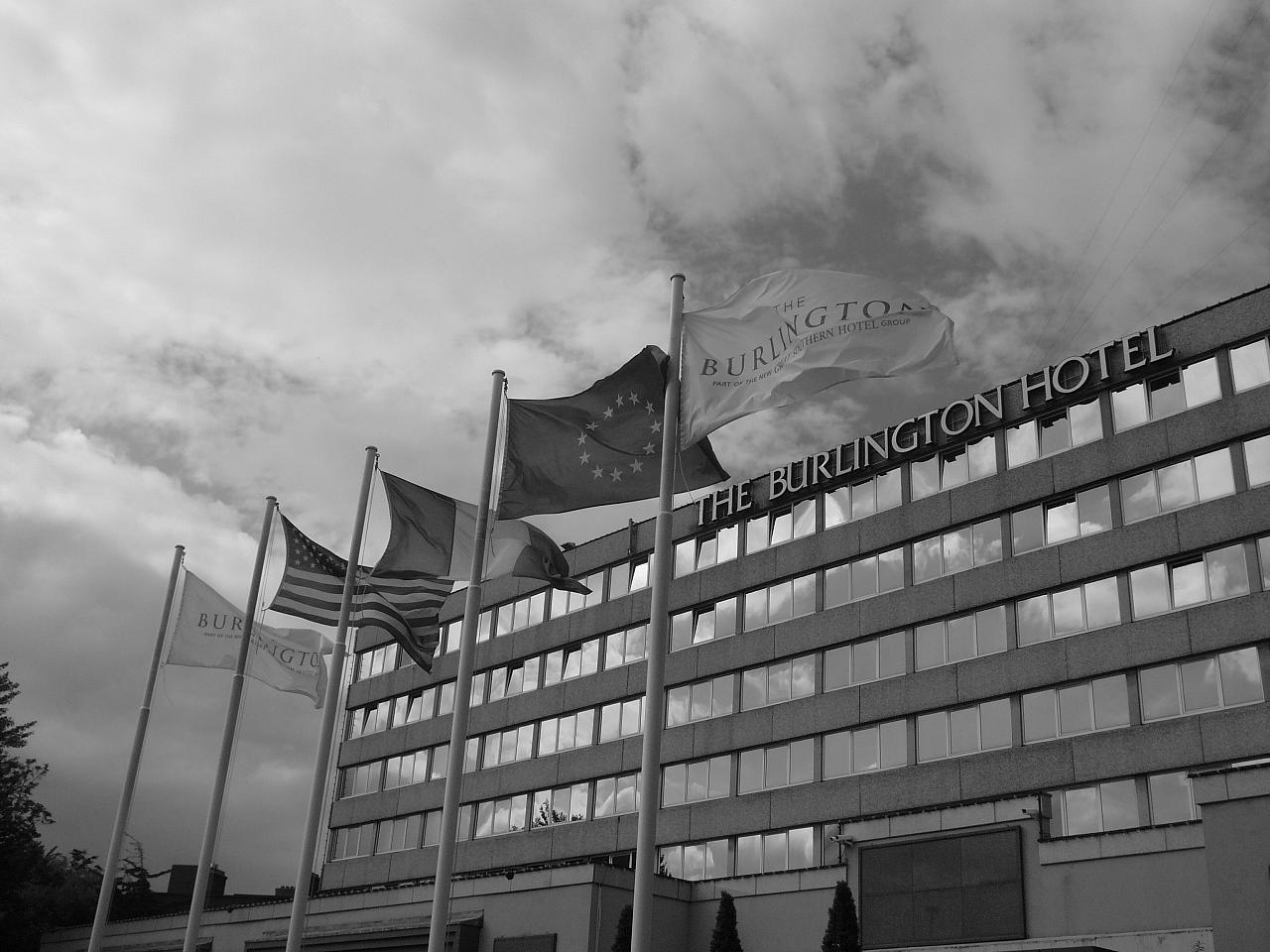
- Clayton Hotel Burlington Road in 2008.

- Location within Central Dublin
- Former names: Burlington Hotel, DoubleTree by Hilton Dublin – Burlington Road
- Hotel chain: Clayton Hotels

General information
- Classification: 4 stars
- Location: Burlington Road; Upper Leeson Street; Dublin 2
- Coordinates: 53.3305869°N 6.2486434°W
- Current tenants: Dalata Hotel Group
- Opening: 1972
- Renovated: 2014
- Owner: DekaBank

Design and construction
- Developer: P.V. Doyle

Other information
- Number of rooms: 502
- Number of suites: 2
- Number of restaurants: 1

Website
- www.claytonhotelburlingtonroad.com

The Clayton Hotel Burlington Road is a hotel in Dublin, Ireland. It is the largest hotel in central Dublin, and the second largest in County Dublin after the Citywest Hotel.

== History ==
The hotel was developed on the site of what was formerly the grounds and boarding houses of Wesley College Dublin and included the Victorian houses and gardens of Burlington House on Burlington Road, Tullamaine Villa on Sussex Road/Leeson Street Upper and Embury House (formerly Burleigh House) also on Burlington Road. It also encompassed the site of the former Mespil House, a large notable Georgian house which was demolished in the 1970s and most of the site of which is now apartments.

Completed in 1972 by PV Doyle initially as part of Doyle Hotels and named the Burlington Hotel and nicknamed "the Burlo" by Dubliners, the hotel was purchased by property developer Bernard McNamara in 2007 for €288 million.

Following the post-2008 Irish economic downturn, Bank of Scotland (Ireland) took possession of the hotel from McNamara. It was sold in 2012 to The Blackstone Group for €67 million, in what was Ireland's biggest property transaction since the start of the downturn. The DoubleTree chain assumed management in 2013, and the hotel was rebranded as DoubleTree by Hilton Dublin – Burlington Road. In 2016, Blackstone sold the hotel to the German investment bank DekaBank, and a 25-year lease to operate the hotel was granted to the Dalata Hotel Group, which rebranded it within their Clayton Hotels brand as Clayton Hotel Burlington Road in November 2016.

The hotel's former nightclub, Club Anabel, gained notoriety in 2000 when the death of Brian Murphy took place during a fight outside the premises.
