= Jurys Inn =

Former hotel chain in the UK and Ireland

Jurys Inn Group Limited
- Type: Private
- Industry: Hotel
- Founded: 1881
- Founder: William Jury
- Defunct: 2023
- Fate: Rebranded as Leonardo Hotels
- Headquarters: Dublin, Ireland
- Number of locations: 38
- Area served: Ireland, United Kingdom, Czech Republic
- Key people: Jason Carruthers (Managing Director)
- Number of employees: 4,000
- Website: jurysinns.com

Jurys Inn was a hotel group founded and headquartered in Ireland with operations across Ireland, the UK and the Czech Republic. It was founded in 1993 and grew to operate 31 hotels in the Great Britain, six in Ireland and one in the Czech Republic, with some 7,500 rooms between them, served by 4,000 employees.

Jurys Inn became a member of the Leonardo Hotels Group, a wholly owned subsidiary of Fattal Hotels, which operates more than 160 hotels in 16 countries. Fattal ran the operating platform for all the Jurys Inn hotels, as well as having the leaseholds for 15 of these. In 2022, it was announced that all Jurys Inn hotels in the UK and Ireland were to be rebranded as Leonardo hotels. Jurys Inn was also part-owned by the Swedish company Pandox AB, a European hotel property investor with 122 hotels in 11 countries, including the freehold of 20 Jurys Inn hotels.

== History ==
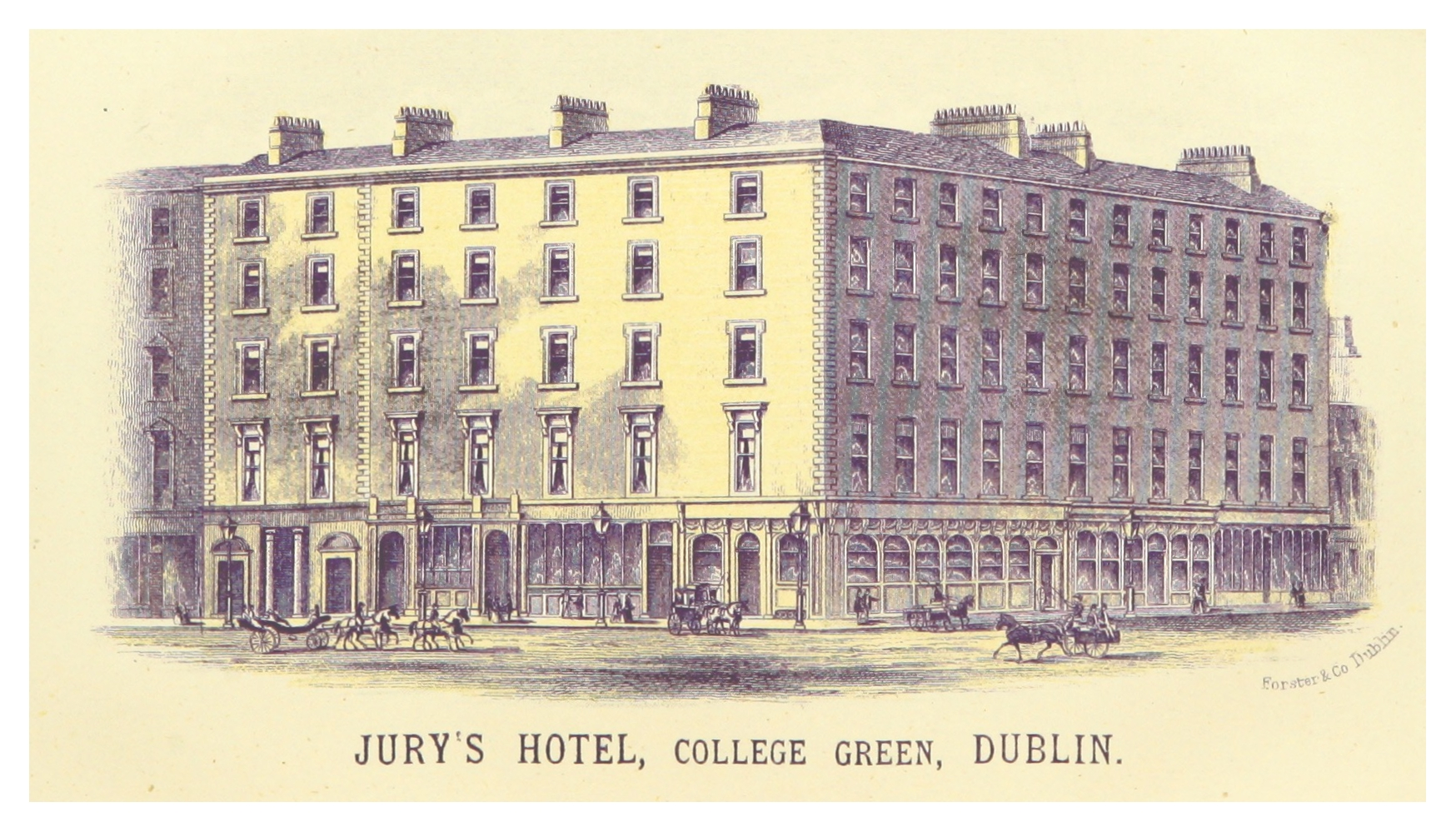
An illustration of Jury's Hotel on College Green, Dublin in 1871.

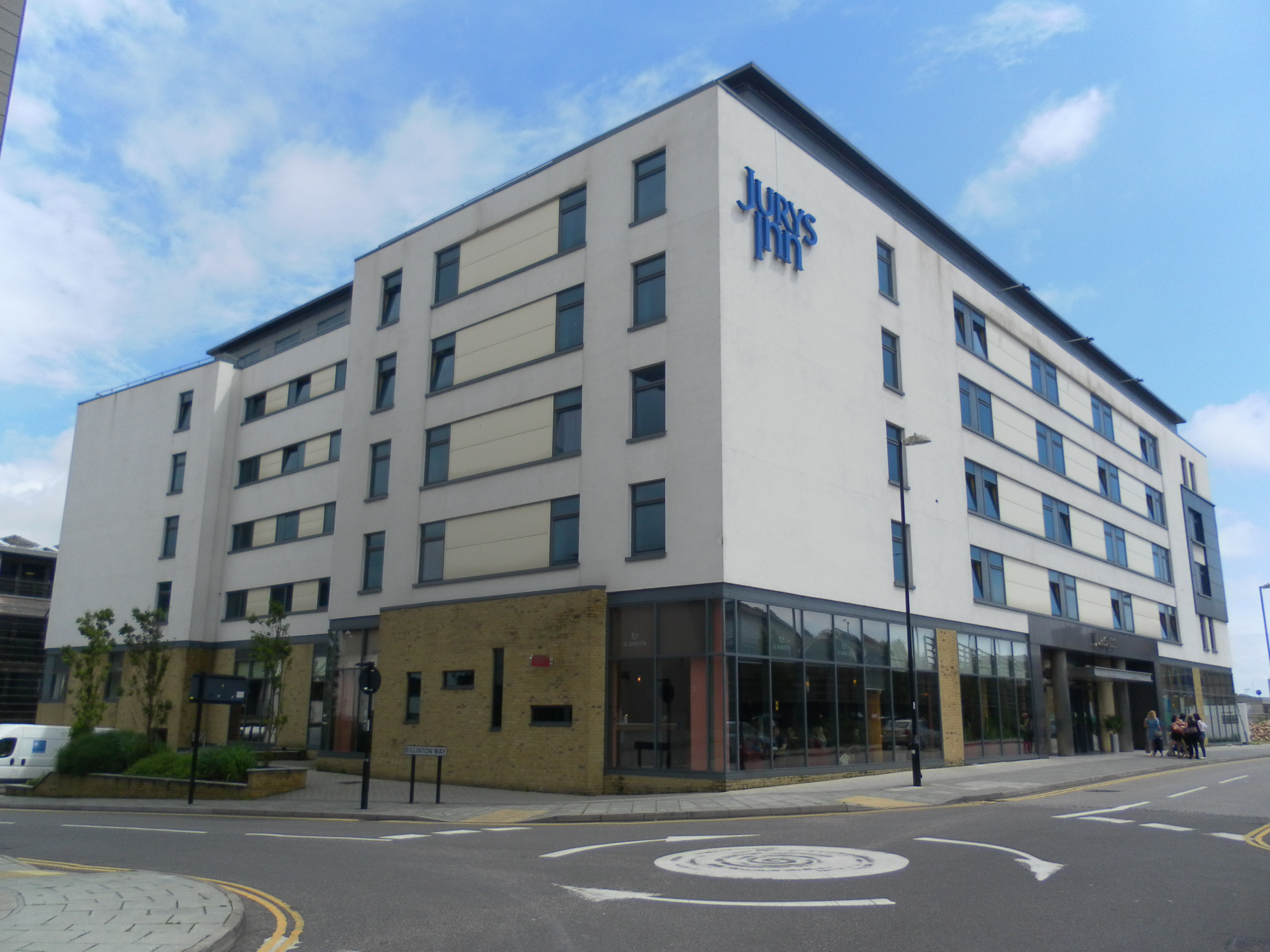
A former Jurys Inn in Brighton

The heritage of the Jurys Group can be traced back to at least 1839, when William Jury opened his hotel in Dublin at College Green catering to the expanding commercial sector. The hotel operated until the 1970s when it was demolished and replaced with offices.

The first Doyle Hotel, The Montrose, was built in Stillorgan, Dublin, in 1964 by PV Doyle. 1993 saw the introduction of the Jurys Inns brand with the opening of the Galway and Christchurch (Dublin) Inns in April and May, respectively.

The chain opened its first hotel in Northern Ireland, in Belfast, in April 1997. It expanded into Great Britain with a hotel in London in May 1998. The Jurys Hotel Group acquired the Doyle portfolio of Dublin, London, and Washington, DC, in 1999, and the newly enlarged organisation became known as Jurys Doyle Hotel Group Ltd. Further expansion came in 2001 with the acquisition of two properties owned by Chamberlain Hotels Limited.

The group was then acquired by Quinlan Private in a €1.165 billion takeover in 2008, while the Oman Investment Fund invested €200 million in a 50% stake. In August 2009, the group opened its first hotel on the European mainland—in Prague, the capital of the Czech Republic. In 2014, three of the company's London hotels (Islington, Chelsea, and Heathrow Airport) were brought under the Hilton Worldwide chain through a franchise agreement and rebranded accordingly—the former two becoming DoubleTree by Hilton hotels and the latter a Hilton Garden Inn.

Throughout 2015, Jurys Inn added 9 hotels that previously operated under the Thistle Hotels and The Hotel Collection brands: Jurys Inn Cheltenham, Jurys Inn Cardiff, Jurys Inn East Midlands Airport, Jurys Inn Oxford, Jurys Inn Middlesbrough, Jurys Inn Brighton Waterfront, Jurys Inn Hinckley Island, Jurys Inn Aberdeen Airport, and Jurys Inn Inverness. Swedish hotel company Pandox and Israeli group Fattal acquired Fattal Hotels from US private equity firm Lone Star in December 2017 for £800 million (€908 million). This portfolio of 37 hotels includes the entire Jurys Inn portfolio of 36 hotels, along with one hotel at London's Heathrow airport, currently trading as a Hilton Garden Inn.

In April 2022, the Fattal Hotel Group announced that the Jurys Inn branding would be retired. The group already operates 145 Leonardo-branded hotels worldwide.

== Locations ==
Under the Jurys Inn hotel brand, the company operated 38 hotels across the UK, Ireland and Czech Republic.

Location	Hotels	Operating Since
Aberdeen, Scotland	Jurys Inn Aberdeen	September 2009
Aberdeen, Scotland	Jurys Inn Aberdeen Airport	October 2015
Belfast, Northern Ireland	Jurys Inn Belfast	April 1997
Birmingham, England	Jurys Inn Birmingham	March 2001
Bradford, England	Jurys Inn Bradford	July 2011
Brighton, England	Jurys Inn Brighton	December 2007
Brighton, England	Jurys Inn Brighton Waterfront	December 2015
Cardiff, Wales	Jurys Inn Cardiff	October 2015
Cheltenham, England	Jurys Inn Cheltenham	October 2015
Cork, Ireland	Jurys Inn Cork	August 1994
Derby, England	Jurys Inn Derby	June 2009
Dublin, Ireland	Jurys Inn Dublin Christchurch	May 1993
Dublin, Ireland	Jurys Inn Dublin Parnell Street	August 2004
Edinburgh, Scotland	Jurys Inn Edinburgh	July 1998
Exeter, England	Jurys Inn Exeter	2009
Galway, Ireland	Jurys Inn Galway	April 1993
Glasgow, Scotland	Jurys Inn Glasgow	August 2003
Greater London, England	Jurys Inn London Croydon	March 2002
Leicestershire, England	Jurys Inn East Midlands, East Midlands Airport, Leices	October 2015
Leicestershire, England	Jurys Inn Hinckley Island, Hinckley	October 2015
Inverness, Scotland	Jurys Inn Inverness	October 2015
Leeds, England	Jurys Inn Leeds	February 2004
Liverpool, England	Jurys Inn Liverpool	April 2008
Manchester, England	Jurys Inn Manchester	April 1999
Middlesbrough, England	Jurys Inn Middlesbrough	October 2015
Milton Keynes, England	Jurys Inn Milton Keynes	August 2006
Newcastle/Gateshead, England	Jurys Inn Newcastle	February 2003
Newcastle/Gateshead, England	Jurys Inn Newcastle Quayside	August 2011
Nottingham, England	Jurys Inn Nottingham	September 2005
Oxford, England	Jurys Inn Oxford	October 2015
Plymouth, England	Jurys Inn Plymouth	June 2007
Prague, Czech Republic	Jurys Inn Prague	August 2009
Sheffield, England	Jurys Inn Sheffield	January 2009
Southampton, England	Jurys Inn Southampton	May 2005
Swindon, England	Jurys Inn Swindon	June 2009
Watford, England	Jurys Inn Watford	March 2009

== Awards ==
The chain received the following accolades:

- Business Travel Awards: Best Small Hotel Group 2017, 2018
- British Travel Awards: Best International Mid-Scale Hotel brand 2015, 2016
- Business Travel Awards: Best Hotel Brand 2010, 2012, 2015
- Irish Travel Industry Awards: Best Irish Hotel Chain 2012, 2013 and 2014
