= Mount Herbert Hotel =

Hotel in Dublin, Ireland

Sandymount Hotel
- Interactive map of the Sandymount Hotel area

General information
- Classification: 4 stars
- Location: Sandymount, Dublin, Ireland, Herbert Road, Dublin, D04 VN88
- Coordinates: 53.333548°N 6.22474°W
- Opened: 1955; 71 years ago
- Owner: The Loughran family

Technical details
- Floor count: 3

Other information
- Number of rooms: 187

Website
- sandymounthotel.ie

Sandymount Hotel (formerly the Mount Herbert Hotel) is a 4 star hotel in Dublin, Ireland, sited on the old Haig's Distillery. The hotel consists of 8 interconnected Victorian houses which were originally constructed in 1866 and built with bricks from the old distillery.

== History ==
For 100 years the buildings were the homes of Dublin aristocracy, with famous residents including Sir Henry Robinson, Vice President of the Irish Local Government Board from 1879 to 1891, and more recently the famous writer Mary Kenny.

== Hotel establishment ==
The hotel was founded in 1955 by a couple from Northern Ireland, George Loughran and his wife Rosaleen and is Dublin's longest-running family owned hotel.. The hotel remains within the family with their son John and grandson Gerard, both directors. Beginning as one house with 4 bedrooms, 7 adjoining houses were acquired and the hotel now has 168 bedrooms, 9 conference & meeting rooms, a bar, restaurant and private parking. On 10 January 2011 the hotel changed its name from Mount Herbert hotel to the Sandymount Hotel.
