= Berkeley Court Hotel =

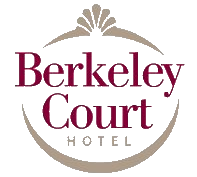
- Logo before Clyde Court Hotel rebranding
- Alternative names: Clyde Court Hotel; D4 Berkeley
- Hotel chain: Doyle Collection

General information
- Type: Hotel
- Location: Lansdowne Road, Ballsbridge, Dublin, Ireland
- Opened: 21 July 1978; 47 years ago
- Closed: 1 January 2016
- Demolished: 2016
- Cost: £1.7 million (equivalent to £8,891,310 in 2023)

Design and construction
- Architect: Martin Henihan
- Developer: Pascal Vincent Doyle

Other information
- Number of rooms: 200

Berkeley Court Hotel was a hotel in Ballsbridge, Dublin, Ireland which was part of the Doyle Collection.

== History ==
On 14 July 1977, hotelier and developer Pascal Vincent Doyle announced that they were planning to open their sixth hotel, called the Berkeley Court Hotel, in Ballsbridge the following year after receiving £75,000 (equivalent to £355,844 in 2021) from the Fáilte Ireland towards the total £1.7 million (equivalent to £7,502,497 in 2021) construction cost.

=== Opening ===
The 200 bedroom hotel was officially opened on 21 July 1978 by the then Minister for Tourism and Transport, Pádraig Faulkner. The architect was Martin Henihan.

=== Sale of hotel ===
In 2005, the Berkeley Court was sold to developer Seán Dunne for €100 million who also purchased the adjacent Jurys Ballsbridge Hotel and the Towers for €260 million.

Dunne had originally envisioned a €1.5 billion development on the site which included a 37-storey skyscraper but this was blocked by planning authorities in 2007. By 2009, Ulster Bank, Rabobank and Kaupthing Bank had taken ownership of the properties and created a new legal entity, renting them back to Dunne's D4 Hotels business. The hotel was renamed to D4 Berkeley at this time.

=== Demolition ===
In September 2015, it was announced that the hotel, then known as the Clyde Court Hotel, was to be demolished for the construction of 200 apartments on the site. The hotel officially closed on 1 January 2016. Newry-based company John Tinnelly & Sons were appointed to demolish the former hotel. Demolition began in late January 2016 and was completed by June of that year.

Lansdowne Place, the new apartment complex built on the site of the former hotel, officially opened on 1 June 2017.
