= Cork International Hotel =

Hotel at Cork Airport, Ireland

- Interactive map of the Cork International Hotel area

General information
- Location: Cork Airport, Cork, Ireland
- Coordinates: 51.8520°N 8.4871°W
- Opening: 1 July 2007
- Owner: Trigon Hotels
- Management: Trigon Hotels

Technical details
- Floor count: 4

Other information
- Number of rooms: 145
- Number of restaurants: 2 + 2 Bars

Website
- Corkinternationalairporthotel.com

Cork International Hotel is a hotel near Cork Airport in Cork, Ireland. It was officially opened on 1 July 2007. The hotel, which is located in the grounds of Cork Airport Business Park, was listed in the 2016 McKennas' Guide "100 Best Places to Stay in Ireland" and the Trivago "Top Hotel Awards 2015".

Cork International Hotel is a four star hotel with 145 rooms. It has 10 meeting rooms.
