= Poppulo =

American software company

- Type: Private
- Industry: Software, SaaS
- Founded: 1996; 30 years ago in County Cork, Ireland
- Founder: Andrew O'Shaughnessy
- Headquarters: Denver, Colorado
- Area served: Global
- Key people: Ruth Fornell, CEO
- Products: Internal communications software
- Services: Software data analytics
- Number of employees: approx. 700 (2026)
- Website: poppulo.com

Poppulo is an American software company that develops employee experience and digital signage software used by companies to reach employees and customers across multiple channels, including email, mobile, digital signage, and collaboration tools.

As of 2026, Poppulo was headquartered in Denver, Colorado and had approximately 700 employees. The company has worked with clients such as Rolls Royce, Bank of America, LinkedIn, Unilever, Nestlé, Aon Hewitt and Johnson Controls.

== History ==
Poppulo (formerly Newsweaver) was founded in 1996 in County Cork, Ireland. Originally formed by Andrew O'Shaughnessy and based in Bandon, the company served clients including 10 Downing Street, the UN and Shell.

It initially provided a Software as a service (SaaS) platform to enable companies to publish and send electronic emails to their customers. In 2017, Newsweaver was rebranded as Poppulo and focused on marketing products for companies to communicate with their employees.

In 2019, Poppulo raised €30 million in funding from US private equity firm Susquehanna Growth Equity (SGE) to expand its presence in North America and Europe. In 2021, Vista Equity Partners facilitated the merger between Poppulo and US-based Four Winds Interactive (maintaining the name Poppulo) in a deal that created a business with, according to Bloomberg at the time, a combined value of $1BN (€0.84BN). The merger also included acquiring SmartSpace. That same year, the company began offering the platform, Poppulo Harmony.

O'Shaughnessy was named "Tech Person of the Year" at the 2022 it@cork Leader Awards, and Poppulo was also included in Ireland's Best Workplaces for Women in 2022. The company won a Vendor IMPACT Award for "Excellence in Employee Intranet & Communication Platforms" in 2024.

In 2025, Poppulo received the ISO/IEC 42001:2023 certification for responsible AI. The company also released a new suite of agentic AI tools for communications across employee channels and digital signage networks. That same year, Poppulo acquired Reach Media Network.

In 2026, it was included in the top 10 "Top Employee Communications Software" at the Data Quadrant Awards. In May 2026, Poppulo acquired the French employee engagement company, Sociabble.

== Services and products ==
Poppulo's products include:

- Poppulo Harmony
- Digital signage
- Multi-channel employee communications
- Internal communications
- Workforce engagement
- Analytics and reporting

== Awards and recognition ==
- 2017 - Best Workplaces in Ireland Award - Listening and Communicating with Employees
- 2022 - Ireland's Best Workplaces for Women
- 2022 - Cork's Leader Award - Tech Person of the Year - Andrew O'Shaughnessy
- 2023 - Power Partner Award - Inc. magazine
- 2024 - Rebrand IMPACT Awards - Vendor Award Winner - Excellence in Employee Intranet & Communication Platforms
- 2026 - Data Quadrant Award - Top 10 Employee Communications Software
