= Pascal Vincent Doyle =

Irish hotelier and developer

- Born: 17 May 1923; Dundrum, Dublin, Ireland
- Died: 6 February 1988 (aged 64); Blackrock Clinic, Dublin, Ireland
- Other names: PV Doyle; Vincent Doyle
- Occupations: Property developer; Hotelier
- Years active: 1945–1988
- Known for: The Doyle Collection
- Notable work: Berkeley Court Hotel; Burlington Hotel
- Spouse: Margaret Ellen Briody (m. 1947–1988)

Pascal Vincent Doyle (17 May 1923 – 6 February 1988), more commonly known as PV Doyle, was an Irish hotelier and property developer who founded the Doyle Collection hotel group.

== Early life ==
Pascal Vincent Doyle was born on 17 May 1923 in Dundrum, Dublin to Michael and Eileen Doyle (née Lawlor), one of seven children. In 1945, at the age of 22, Doyle built a pub and leisure complex called the County Club in Churchtown. Following the success of this venture, he moved into the hotel business.

The first hotel that Doyle developed was the South County Hotel in Stillorgan, now called the Stillorgan Park Hotel, which opened in 1964. Pascal officially registered his hotel company as P. V. Doyle Hotels Limited on 4 September 1969.

=== Personal life ===
Doyle married Margaret Ellen (née Briody), a nurse, in Ballynarry Church, Kilnaleck, Cavan in 1947. They had five children together; sons Michael, David and daughters Anne, Eileen and Bernie.

=== Death ===
Pascal Doyle died on 6 February 1988 in Blackrock Clinic aged 64. The funeral was held on 9 February 1988 in St Laurence's Church, Kilmacud followed by interment in Dean's Grange Cemetery. The then President of Ireland Patrick Hillery and Taoiseach Charles Haughey attended P. V. Doyle's funeral.

Margaret died 22 October 2010, aged 93, and had left €31 million in her will.
