= Paddy McKillen =

Northern Irish businessman and hotelier

Patrick McKillen (born 1955) is an international hotelier, property investor and businessman.

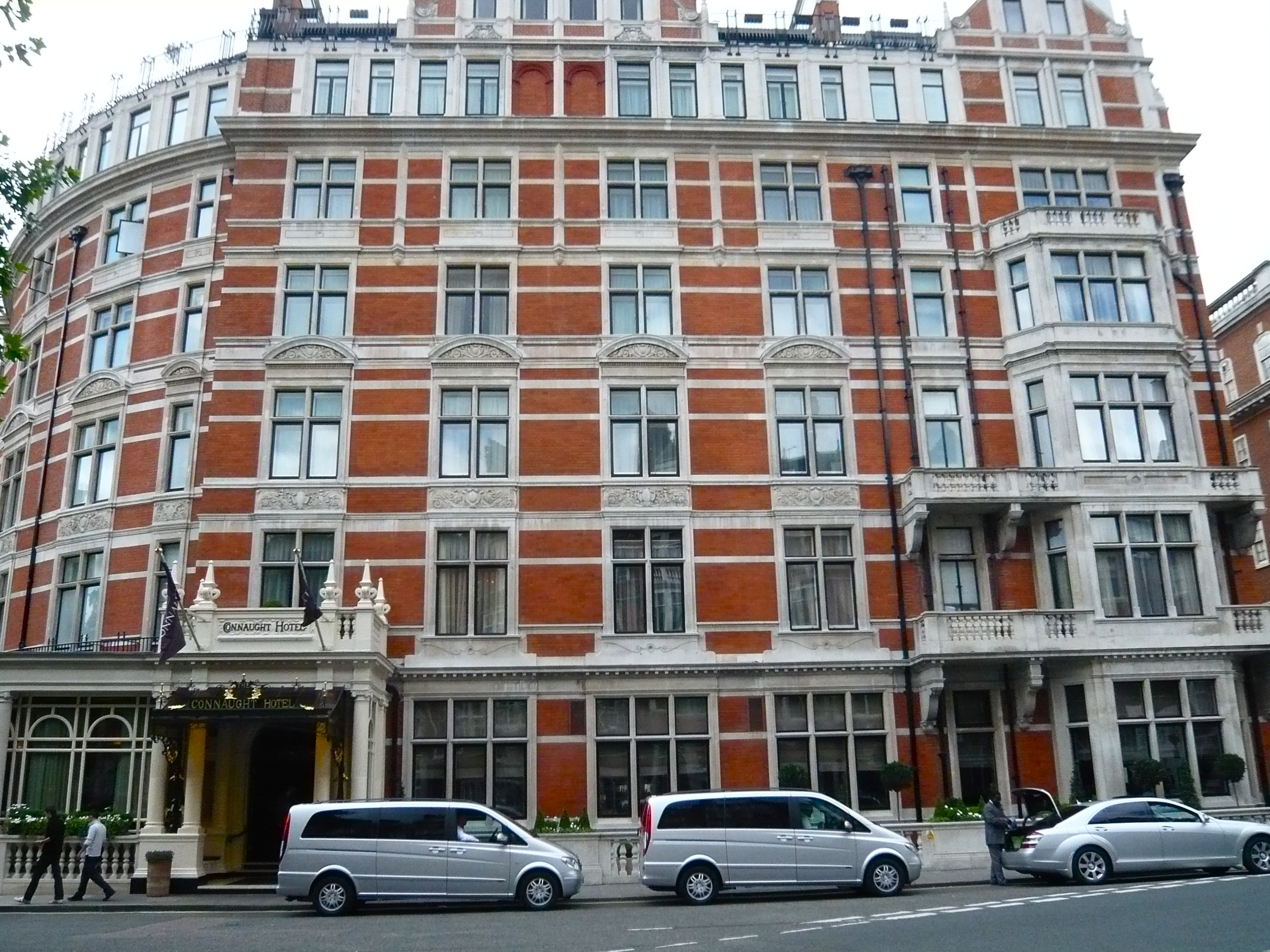
McKillen at one time had ownership in the Connaught Hotel in London

== Biography ==
Paddy McKillen (born 1955: Belfast, Northern Ireland) is an Irish businessman and property investor. He is best known for his investment and development of luxury hotels and real estate in London, France and Japan. McKillen has been active for several decades in the property sector with a portfolio spanning Europe, Asia and South America.

=== Early life ===
During the 1980s, McKillen built up a portfolio of assets including commercial buildings, retail stores and shopping centres in Dublin, Belfast, Cork and Limerick. Early ventures include the Jervis Street and Powerscourt Townhouse Shopping Centres in Dublin and several retail and commercial buildings in Dublin and other cities in Ireland.

In the 1990s, he turned his attention to building an international property business. He focused on buying properties with significant unrealized potential in key locations, improving them and managing and holding the assets for the long-term. He built a portfolio including hotels, retail and commercial properties in Europe, the US, Asia and South America.

=== International Property and Hotels ===
McKillen is well known for his long term ownership and restoration work of the Maybourne Hotel Group in London which includes Claridges, The Connaught and Berkeley Hotels. He has received worldwide recognition for his development of Chateau La Coste in Provence, France which includes Villa la Coste, a luxury hotel. The estate features art and architecture by Tadao Ando, Louise Bourgeois, Bob Dylan, Tracey Emin, Andre Fu, Frank Gehry, Richard Rogers, Jean Nouvel, Renzo Piano, Ai Weiwei and Franz West. In 2022 McKillen opened the Shinmonzn a Tadao Ando designed hotel in Gion, Kyoto.

His portfolio includes other assets in Paris, the US, Argentina and Vietnam where he is developing a biotechnology campus that includes a university, research facilities and hospital.

=== Recognition ===
In November 2025 Paddy McKillen was awarded the Trophée de L’Alliance Award, for his visionary work in hospitality, architecture, and cultural enrichment. In 2020 McKillen was named an Officer of the Ordre des Arts et des Lettres by the French Ministry of Culture for his impact on global arts. In 2022 he received an honorary Doctor of Science degree from Ulster University for his achievements in hospitality and contributions to peace and reconciliation in Ireland. He serves as Honorary Consul of Vietnam in Ireland, reflecting his ongoing commitment to cultural diplomacy.
