= The 7 O'Clock Show =

- Genre: Afternoon news and talk show
- Presented by: Lucy Kennedy; Martin King
- Country of origin: Ireland
- Original language: English

Production
- Production locations: Ballymount, Dublin

Original release
- Network: TV3; 3e
- Release: 15 February 2015 – present

Related
- Ireland AM; Midday; Xposé; TV3 News

The Seven O'Clock Show is an Irish evening-time television show that aired on TV3. It is a live show, and provides chat, live music, cooking, entertainment, showbiz and technology updates. It replaced Late Lunch Live. The show was pushed back to 18:00 and moved to weekends due to the return of Emmerdale and Coronation Street to TV3. The show is currently sponsored by Dolmio.

== Background ==
The Seven O'Clock Show first began as an early afternoon show live on TV3 then called Late Lunch Live. As part of the revamp of TV3's daytime schedule due to falling audience figures an extended version of Ireland AM and Late Lunch Live replaced The Morning Show. Late Lunch Live premiered on 30 September 2013, airing every Monday to Friday from 14:00. By 2014 the show was moved to a new timeslot of 15:30 to 16:30. The programme proved successful and it was later decided to rebrand the show and to give it a primetime slot of 19:00.

The programme features in-studio guests, live performances, updates on showbiz, TV, technology, events around the country and general chat with its daily guests.

The Seven O'Clock Show is hosted by Lucy Kennedy, and Martin King are the main hosts. Claire Solan acted as a reporter in the earlier shows.

On 30 January 2015 the TV3 Group confirmed Late Lunch Live would be replaced with The Seven O'Clock Show, which premiered on 16 February 2015.

With the refresh and rebrand to The Seven O' Clock Show, Kennedy and King present the show four days a week with a rotation of presenters on Friday's edition. This includes Ray Foley and Mairead Farrell, or Lousie Duffy and Anton Savage.

Due to the return of Emmerdale and Coronation Street, the show was renamed The 6 O'Clock Show and The 7 O'Clock Show was moved to weekends. The show had got new hosts such as Mark Cagney witch he continued his career on Ireland AM, and Ciara Doherty.

== Presenters ==
- Lucy Kennedy (Monday to Thursday)
- Martin King (Monday to Thursday)
- Ray Foley (on Friday's edition)
- Mairead Farrell (on Friday's edition)
- Lousie Duffy (on Friday's edition)
- Anton Savage (on Friday's edition)

== Special contributors ==
- Conor Pope - Budgeting and Consumer Affairs
