= The 6 O'Clock Show =

Irish evening-time television show

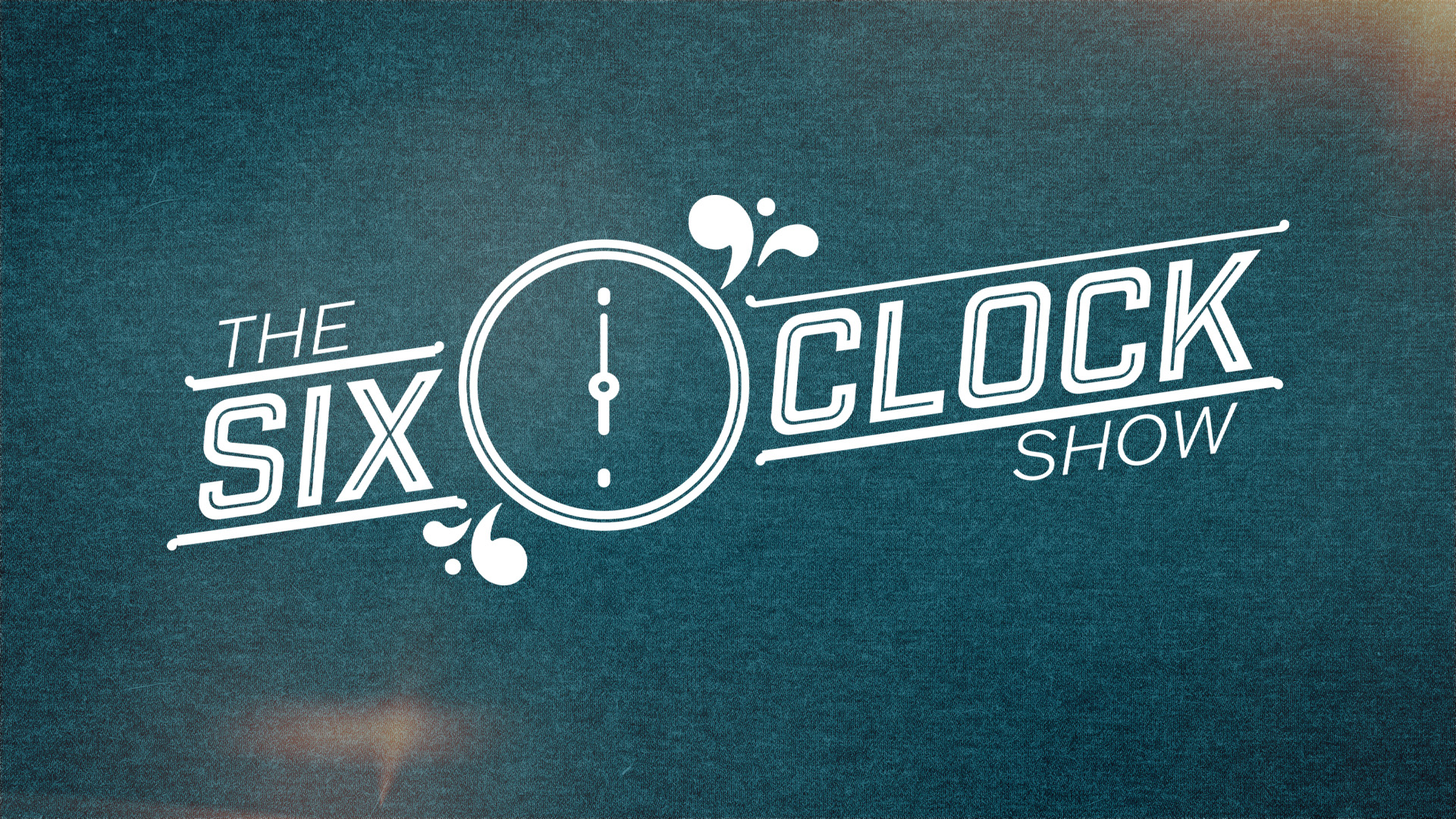
- Genre: Chat Show
- Presented by: Lottie Ryan; Brian Dowling
- Country of origin: Ireland
- Original language: English

Production
- Production locations: Virgin Media Television HD Studio, Ballymount, Dublin

Original release
- Network: Virgin Media One
- Release: 15 February 2015 – present

Related
- Ireland AM; Midday; Xposé; TV3 News; The 7 O'Clock Show

The Six O'Clock Show is an Irish evening-time television show on Virgin Media One (formerly known as "TV3"). Broadcast live, the show provides chat, live music, cooking, entertainment, showbiz and technology updates. It replaced The 7 O'Clock Show as Emmerdale and Coronation Street returned to TV3.

== Background ==
The Six O'Clock Show first began as an early afternoon show live on TV3 then called Late Lunch Live. As part of the revamp of TV3's daytime schedule due to falling audience figures an extended version of Ireland AM and Late Lunch Live replaced The Morning Show. Late Lunch Live premiered on 30 September 2013, airing every Monday to Friday from 14:00. By 2014 the show was moved to a new timeslot of 15:30 to 16:30. The programme featured in-studio guests, live performances, updates on showbiz, TV, technology, events around the country and general chat with its daily guests.

On 30 January 2015 the TV3 Group confirmed Late Lunch Live would be replaced with The Seven O'Clock Show and The Six O'Clock Show witch aired on weekends at first, which premiered on 16 February 2015. Both presenters of Late Lunch Live joined the new show.

With the refresh and rebrand to The Seven O' Clock Show, Lucy Kennedy and Martin King presented the show four days a week with a rotation of presenters on Friday's edition. This includes Ray Foley and Mairead Farrell, or Lousie Duffy and Anton Savage.

Due to the return of Emmerdale and Coronation Street, the show was renamed The 6 O'Clock Show and was pushed back to 18:00. And The 7 O'Clock Show was moved to weekends. Muireann O'Connell and Martin King acted as the main hosts through 2021 before O'Connell was replaced by Karen Koster - a year later, King was confirmed to depart the show for Ireland AM, with Greg O'Shea announced to replace him.

The Friday evening edition was replaced by Xposé in March 2019. Following the cancellation of Xposé, the show returned to its usual five nights a week from October 2019. As of 2023, Karen Koster and Greg O'Shea acted as regular hosts from Monday to Thursday, with Gráinne Seoige hosting the Friday edition alongside O'Shea. In November 2023, Koster and O'Shea left the series, with Brian Dowling and Katja Mia brought in as the new permanent hosts of the show. In April 2026, Mia announced her departure and hosted her final show the same month, with a selection of guest presenters co-anchoring with Dowling Gourounlian throughout the summer. In June 2026, Lottie Ryan was announced to be the show's new full-time presenter.

== Presenters ==
- Brian Dowling
- Lottie Ryan

Cover Presenters

- Fionnuala Jones
- Darren Kennedy
- Deric Hartigan
- Tracy Clifford
- Una Healy
- Daniella Moyles
- James Kavanagh

Former Presenters

- Katja Mia
- Martin King
- Greg O'Shea
- Karen Koster (excluding Fridays and summer shows)
- Zeinab Elguzouli (cover)
- Louise Cantillon (cover)
- Brooke Scullion (cover)
- Gráinne Seoige (Friday/summer shows)
- Ray Foley (Friday/cover)
- Muireann O'Connell
- Lucy Kennedy (Monday to Thursday)
- Mairead Farrell (Friday)
- Louise Duffy (Friday)
- Anton Savage (Friday)
- Deirdre O'Kane (during Kennedy's maternity leave)
- Samantha Mumba (during Kennedy's maternity leave)
- Una Healy (cover)
- Kamal Ibrahim (Friday/cover)

== Special contributors ==
- Conor Pope – Budgeting and Consumer Affairs
- Fionnuala Jones – Showbiz
- Zeinab Elguzouli - Showbiz/TV
- Éanna Ní Lamhna – Nature
- Fionnuala Moran - Climate
- Sarina Bellissimo - TV
- Adrian Martin – Chef
- Aisling Larkin – Chef
- Kwanghi Chan – Chef
- Gareth Mullins – Chef
- Eoin Sheehan - Chef
- Neil Mulholland - Chef
- Erica Drum - Chef
- Sham Hanifa - Chef
- Conor Spacey - Chef
- Maria Harte - Chef
- Mindi Keane - Chef

Former contributors

- Padraig Walsh - Psychologist
- Leisha McGrath - Psychologist
- David Atkinson – Online Reporter
- Anna Geary – Sport
- Eoghan Doherty – Regional Reporter
- Ciara King – Events Reporter
- Paddy Smyth - TV
- Andy O’Donoghue – Tech Guru
- Derry Clarke – Chef
- Kevin Dundon – Chef
- Orla McAndrew - Chef
- David and Stephen Flynn (The Happy Pear) – Chef
- Yvonne Connolly – Chef
- Russell Alford & Patrick Hanlon (GastroGays) – Chef
- Darina Coffey – Chef
- Graham Herterich (The Cupcake Bloke) – Chef
- Gary O'Hanlon – Chef
- Louise Lennox - Chef

== On-air identity ==
Previous Logo
