= Muireann O'Connell =

Irish broadcaster (born 1983)

- Born: 1983 (age 42–43); Dooradoyle, County Limerick, Ireland
- Occupations: radio and television broadcaster, podcaster

Muireann O'Connell (born 1983) is an Irish radio and television broadcaster and podcaster from Dooradoyle, County Limerick, known for her work on Virgin Media Ireland and Today FM.

She has presented Ireland AM and The 6 O'Clock Show on Virgin Media One. She co-hosts a podcast, And Another Thing with comedian Emma Doran.

== Early life ==
In her youth, O'Connell worked as staff in the Trinity Rooms nightclub in Limerick City.

== Career ==
O'Connell started broadcasting with Limerick's Live 95FM and SPIN South West.

She was announced as a presenter on Today FM in 2018, following the withdrawal from public life of Al Porter. She was replaced by former Ray Darcy Show producer Mairead Ronan in 2019.

She co-hosted The 6 O'Clock Show with Ray Foley and then Martin King from 2017 to 2021.

After The 6 O'Clock Show, she moved to Ireland AM.

== Personal life ==
O'Connell went to school at Crescent College in Limerick. As of 2023, O'Connell was engaged to a man not in the public eye. O'Connell has spoken publicly of her wish not to have children.
