= Cassie Stokes =

Irish television presenter

- Born: Cassandra Stokes; 5 April 1987 (age 39); Dublin, Ireland
- Occupation: Presenter
- Employer: TV3
- Known for: Helping Vincent Browne with his "Tweet machine"
- Notable credit: Xposé

Cassie Stokes (born 5 April 1987) is a television presenter with TV3.

== Career ==
She initially joined TV3 as a Promotions Assistant. She appeared on-screen as the Twitter correspondent on Tonight with Vincent Browne, helping the experienced journalist figure out how to use the "Tweet machine" live on air. Mario Rosenstock referred to her in his television sketches on the programme ahead of the 2011 general election. She considers Browne her mentor and maintained contact with him for years afterwards.

She worked as a cyber reporter on the 3e programme FYI for three years until 2013. She left Ireland in 2013 and worked as a co-host on Entertainment Tonight Canada. TV3 asked her to audition as a presenter on Xposé as cover for Karen Koster and Aisling O'Loughlin, who were both going on maternity leave. In April 2016, she was announced as a new presenter of Xposé.

== Personal life ==
She is a Dubliner, from Dundrum. She was reared between Ireland and Canada and has lived in the UK. She split from her girlfriend shortly before beginning work on Xposé.
