= Kirsteen O'Sullivan =

Scottish television presenter (born 1979)

- Born: Kirsteen O'Sullivan; 24 November 1979 (age 46); Chesterfield, England
- Occupation: Broadcaster
- Employer: TV3
- Known for: UEFA Champions League, Xposé, Just for Laughs

Kirsteen O'Sullivan (born 24 November 1979) is a Scottish presenter on TV3 in Ireland and on BBC South Today.

O'Sullivan joined TV3 in July 2009 as a freelance journalist on TV3 News. She presented TV3's motoring show Xccelerate and has appeared as a reporter on GMTV. She began presenting TV3's coverage of the UEFA Champions League in February 2010. She was a hit with the nation's football fans.

On 23 November 2011, on the eve of her 32nd birthday, it was announced that O'Sullivan had become an Xposé girl. She became cover for host Aisling O'Loughlin who went on maternity leave. O'Sullivan's first official Xposé interview was with Tommy Hilfiger in London. Kirsteen has also starred in several Just for Laughs pranks.
