= Lisa Cannon =

Irish television presenter

- Born: June 1978; Dublin, Ireland

Lisa Cannon (born June 1978) is an Irish television presenter and producer known for her work with Xposé Ireland AM and Box Office all broadcast on Virgin Media Television where Cannon has been a presenter for 11 years.

== Early life ==
Born in Dublin in 1978, to secondary school teachers Michael and Laura Cannon, Cannon attended the private girls' Mount Anville Secondary School, where she was a prefect/head girl, and was the recipient of the school prize for outstanding achievement in the arts, presented by the Irish President Mary McAleese. She went on to study at Trinity College, Dublin, where she graduated with a B.A in Drama & Theatre Studies, and an M.A in Film.

== Career ==
Cannon started her media career with a five-year stint on FM104 and Dublin's Q102 and in print journalism, before moving to Ireland's national television networks RTÉ, working on Nationwide and then to TV3 (now Virgin Media Television), where she has spent over 10 years.

She currently anchors and produces Box Office which airs on Virgin Media Two. Cannon also works as an event host, brand ambassador and influencer. She has interviewed numerous individuals, including Meryl Streep, Robert De Niro, Al Pacino, Mick Jagger, Kylie Minogue, Beyoncé, and Brad Pitt, and Duchess Meghan Markle.

As an MC, Canon's introductions include the first European screening of the James Bond 007 movie, Spectre. She has received multiple nominations for ‘Most Stylish Woman in Ireland' at the VIP Style Awards.

Cannon was the first ambassador for Weight Watchers Ireland. Cannon was Editor of Irish Wedding Diary for 11 years and was ranked in the #murraytweetindex Top 2 most Influential Entertainment Journalists in Ireland in 2016 and 2017.

As a TV/film producer she has worked on productions such as King Arthur, In America and Sex and the City for HBO in the USA. She produced the documentary I Shot John Lennon for NBC and Channel 4 and recently developed, produced and presented the From Presenter to Powerlifter television documentary, a personal account of her physical journey from TV presenter to the Powerlifting Championships in the space of 3 months broadcast on Virgin Media.

== Personal life ==
Cannon married Welsh former professional Rugby Player Richard Keatley in 2015 in Florence, Italy.

== Filmography ==
Television
