= Aidan Cooney =

Irish radio presenter

- Occupations: Radio presenter, journalist
- Employer: Ireland’s Classic Hits Radio
- Known for: Radio work, Former member of the Ireland AM team on TV3/ Virgin Media Television

Aidan Cooney is an Irish radio presenter. He was a presenter of Ireland AM on TV3 (now Virgin Media Television) from 1999 to 2018. He has since began hosting on radio formerly as a breakfast show and weekend show host on Dublin’s Q102. since late August 2025 he’s been presenting a weekend radio show on Sundays from 2-6pm on Ireland’s Classic Hits Radio since August 2025.

== Ireland AM ==
Cooney joined the Ireland AM team in 1999 for its first broadcast. He anchored the sports bulletins in between running in and out of the studio kitchen where he interviewed various chefs and also helped preparing the food.

Cooney took part in a “Eat less, move more” three month challenge on Ireland AM designed to make him lose part his excess weight, he also underwent laboratory tests.

In 2010, Cooney spoke to Paul Galvin in his first full interview since Galvin was given an eight-week ban from the CCCC.

In 2018, Cooney was absent for several weeks from the show, before it was later confirmed that he had parted ways with the show. Presenter Mark Cagney, who departed the programme in 2019, paid tribute to Cooney on his last show saying that Cooney "was a integral part of the band. We did not get to say goodbye to him the way we wanted to and to thank him the way we wanted to for circumstances I can't go in to here and they're not really relevant."

== Sports Tonight ==
Cooney has in the past fronted TV3’s nightly flagship show Sports Tonight and was frontman for the UEFA Champions League series for three seasons. He was TV3 news anchor from 1998 to 2003. He took part in the Dublin Marathon in 2006 and 2007.

Cooney began his career with Eamonn Cooke's Radio Dublin in the late 1970s as Aidan Jay, while also holding down a permanent job as a junior official with the Revenue Commissioners. He went on to a number of other pirate stations in Dublin including ARD, Big D, Community Broadcasting Corporation, Annabel Radio, Sunshine Radio, Radio Nova, Q102 and Treble TR. Aidan was the weekend breakfast presenter on Century Radio (Ireland's first national commercial radio station) between September and November 1989. He then was involved with Dublin's 98FM (initially called Classic Hits 98FM), initially as Head of Sport ("our man Aidan Cooney"). He eventually got to present the weekday breakfast show with Kara Hanahoe, before leaving for TV3 in 1999. When Newstalk launched in Dublin, he was initially its weekend sports presenter.

He damaged his ankle in 1999.

He went to the United States to cover the 1994 FIFA World Cup for Classic Hits 98-FM.

He spoke in support of Meteor's controversial advertisement involving the ejection of an elderly lady from a party for not bringing a mobile phone as a gift.
