= Mark Cagney =

Irish radio and television presenter

- Born: Mark Anthony Cagney; 11 June 1956 (age 70); Cork, Ireland
- Occupations: Television presenter; Journalist; voiceover artist, radio presenter & broadcaster
- Known for: Ireland AM
- Spouses: Ann Cagney (m. 1978; died 1991) Audrey Cagney (m. 1992)
- Children: Gerard; Daniel; Sophie; Mary

Mark Anthony Cagney (born 11 June 1956) is an Irish television presenter and journalist, best known for presenting Ireland AM, the breakfast show on TV3 from 1999 to 2019.

== Early life ==
Born in Cork, Ireland, Cagney was one of eight children in the family; he left home at age 15 because of difficulties with his father, who he described as a "remarkable man": an inventor, a musician, a welder, a mechanic, and a lecturer in electronics.

== Career ==
Cagney learned how to take care of himself as a result of being on his own so early. He longed to have some musical ability, but settled for working with a variety of bands. He also learned about audio and audio studio processes; this got him a job as a shore-based radio operator. He devoted quite a bit of his paycheck to visiting night clubs; when a disk jockey did not show up for work, Cagney was asked to fill in, doing well enough at it to become a regular at the pirate radio station and now had two jobs. He called himself "Mark Anthony". Before long, he was at RTÉ Radio Cork.

He joined RTÉ in 1977, and was part of the original line-up of 2FM, broadcasting on its first night on air. During his time with 2FM, he presented a variety of shows, from the seminal Night Train to the Drivetime show. In 1985 he won a Jacobs' Award for his midnight radio show. In 1989 he joined the new 98FM, staying there for seven years. He joined Today FM in 1998 and then joined TV3 Ireland. He won the TV Personality of the Year Award in 2005 at the 3rd Irish Film and Television Awards. he hosted the breakfast show Ireland AM on TV3 since it started in 1999.

In July 2019, it was announced that Cagney would be leaving Ireland AM at the end of July after twenty years with the programme. On 31 July 2019 Cagney presented his last Ireland AM alongside Karen Koster and Alan Hughes. The show dedicated the last half hour to him and aired a highlights reel. All the production crew, including Ciara Doherty, who was on maternity leave at the time, came in to wish Cagney good luck in his future endeavours.

Cagney filled in for Ivan Yates on The Hard Shoulder drive-time radio show during Yates’ time at Newstalk. From the early 2021 - early 2026. Cangeney has also sat in for various presenters on Newstalk Breakfast before and has presented various Bank Holiday Specials on Newstalk in the past .

== Personal life ==
He lives in Bayside, Dublin in the north County Dublin with his second wife Audrey and their four children. His first wife, Ann, whom he met when he was 19, died of a brain haemorrhage; the couple had been married 11 years. When Ann died, Cagney was devastated; Audrey, who worked with him at 98 FM, provided emotional support, which turned into love.

=== Health ===
When Cagney discovered he was having difficulty hearing, he went for testing; the results showed he had hearing loss. He was fitted with a hearing aid, and in 2008, chose to make the information public.

Cagney was a heavy user of cocaine in the 1980s.

Cagney has been diagnosed with genetic haemochromatosis (iron overload), which, unknown to him in his early years with Ireland AM, caused him constant fatigue.
