= Sinéad Desmond =

Irish journalist and television presenter

Sinéad Desmond (born 11 September 1974) is an Irish journalist and television presenter.

== Career ==
Working in London for the majority of her career in print journalism, she was a writer and reporter for many major newspaper and magazine titles. In 2007 she became the longest serving female anchor of Ireland AM, a morning television show on TV3. She became a household name in the ten years she presented the show. In November 2017 she resigned due to a gender pay gap dispute. Desmond has not spoken about this publicly except to say the matter is now a legal one. Desmond has also worked as a columnist for several publications, including The Observer, Marie Claire, Vogue and Sun.

== Personal life ==
Desmond is a fluent speaker of French, German and Italian.

Her agent is Noel Kelly, of NK Management.

On 10 June 2008, she was rushed to hospital having suffered a brain haemorrhage on the set of Ireland AM. She made a full recovery and weeks later was released from hospital.

In September 2009, after suffering altitude sickness, she was rescued by a helicopter on Mont Blanc.

In 2014, she danced in the Breast Cancer Ireland's Strictly Against Breast Cancer Fundraiser.
