= Livin' with Lucy =

- Starring: Lucy Kennedy
- Country of origin: Ireland
- No. of seasons: 5
- No. of episodes: 20+

Production
- Running time: 30 minutes

Original release
- Network: RTÉ Two (2008–10); Virgin Media One (2016–)
- Release: 14 April 2008

Related
- The Podge and Rodge Show; The Lucy Kennedy Show

Livin' with Lucy is an Irish television programme presented by Lucy Kennedy. First aired on 14 April 2008, the premise of the show is that Kennedy spends a weekend living with a different celebrity each episode, analysing their daily lives and interviewing them in their own homes all the while with cameras filming in the background. The show aired originally on RTÉ Two on Monday nights at 21:30. The programme has proven controversial, with Kennedy being stalked by paparazzi and some of the celebrities airing slanderous views.

Series two began on 20 October 2008. Series three began to air on RTÉ Two on Thursday 11 November 2010 and ended on 16 December 2010.

== Episodes on RTÉ ==
=== Series 1 ===
Series one began on 14 April 2008. During filming of the show Kennedy was hunted by the paparazzi and subjected to vicious photography and googling when she stayed with British tabloid fodder Jade Goody. She encountered controversy whilst staying with Samantha Mumba when the singer launched a verbal attack on Irish radio presenter Dave Fanning, calling him a number of unprintable expletives. David Norris was said to have commented: "I tire out people half my age. I had Lucy Kennedy staying with me for her Livin' with Lucy series and she had to go to bed for a week afterwards."

Date of transmission	Celebrity host	Source
14 April 2008	Samantha Mumba	
21 April 2008	Jade Goody	
28 April 2008	David Norris	
5 May 2008	Brian McFadden	
12 May 2008	Calum Best	
19 May 2008	Daithí Ó Sé	

=== Series 2 ===
Series two began on 20 October 2008. In the first episode presenter Lucy Kennedy spent three days with Shane Lynch in his caravan in Surrey. Don Baker enticed Kennedy into his jacuzzi and she also joined him on stage to play the tambourine.

Date of transmission	Celebrity host	Source
20 October 2008	Shane Lynch	
27 October 2008	Don Baker	
3 November 2008	Sonia O'Sullivan	
10 November 2008	Adele King	

=== Series 3 ===
Series three began on 11 November 2010 and ended on 16 December 2010.

Date of transmission	Celebrity host
11 November 2010	Crystal Swing
18 November 2010	Vanessa Feltz
25 November 2010	Jermaine Jackson
2 December 2010	Derek Acorah
9 December 2010	Simon Delaney
16 December 2010	David Gest

== Episodes on TV3/Virgin Media ==
=== Series 1 ===
In August 2016 TV3 (Ireland) announced they had taken over the rights of the show and changed to Living with Lucy. Shane Long, Kerry Katona and Jedward were among the celebrities appearing in the series.

Date of transmission	Celebrity host	Ref.
20 September 2016	Shane Long	
4 October 2016	Kerry Katona	
11 October 2016	Al Porter	
25 October 2016	Jedward	
8 November 2016	Brendan Grace	
15 November 2016	Finbar Furey	

=== Series 2 ===
Date of transmission	Celebrity host	Ref.
19 September 2017	Davy Fitzgerald	
3 October 2017	Katie Hopkins	
10 October 2017	Michael Healy-Rae	
24 October 2017	Danniella Westbrook	
7 November 2017	Dickie Rock	
14 November 2017	Sarah Harding	

=== Series 3 ===
In September 2018 Virgin Media One, the new name for TV3 broadcast this series.

Date of transmission	Celebrity host	Ref.
3 September 2018	Nathan Carter	
10 September 2018	Gemma Collins	
17 September 2018	Christy Dignam	
24 September 2018	Kellie Maloney	
1 October 2018	Ivan Yates	

=== Series 4 ===
Date of transmission	Celebrity host	Ref.
2 September 2019	Gráinne Seoige	
9 September 2019	John Connors	
16 September 2019	Nadine Coyle	
23 September 2019	Barry Keoghan	
30 September 2019	Deirdre O'Kane	

=== Lodging with Lucy ===
Due to the COVID-19 pandemic and various lockdown rules, Lucy Kennedy hosted a variation of the show, Lodging with Lucy, in which guests came to stay with her in a hired lodge in County Meath, Ireland.

Date of transmission	Celebrity host	Ref.
28 September 2020	Paul McGrath	
5 October 2020	Ian Dempsey & Mario Rosenstock	
12 October 2020	Adele King	
19 October 2020	Greg O'Shea	
2 November 2020	Amy Huberman	
9 November 2020	Lynn Ruane	

=== Series 5 ===
Date of transmission	Celebrity host	Ref.
11 October 2021	Pat Spillane	
18 October 2021	Paul Gascoigne	
25 October 2021	Hughie Maughan	
1 November 2021	Michelle Heaton	
8 November 2021	Rory O'Neill	
15 November 2021	Rachel Allen	

=== Series 6 ===
Date of transmission	Celebrity host	Ref.
22 October 2023	Simon Gregson	
29 October 2023	Katie Price	
5 November 2023	Des Cahill	
12 November 2023	Andrew Maxwell	
26 November 2023	Richie Sadlier	
3 December 2023	Mary Coughlan	

=== Series 7 ===
Date of transmission	Celebrity host	Ref.
12 October 2025	Caitlyn Jenner	
19 October 2025	James McClean	
26 October 2025	Diarmuid Gavin	
2 November 2025	Nicola Tallant	

== See also ==
Stacey Dooley Sleeps Over
