= Adele King =

Irish entertainer (born 1951)

Adèle King
- Born: Adèle Condron-King; 4 April 1951 (age 75); Dublin, Ireland
- Occupation: Entertainer
- Years active: 1956–present
- Known for: Stage performances, television appearances, pantomime
- Notable work: Twink, Play the Game, Celebrity Head Chef
- Children: Chloë Agnew, Naomi Agnew
- Awards: Jacob's Award (1981)

Adèle King (born Adèle Condron-King, 4 April 1951) is an Irish entertainer better known as Twink. She is from Dublin. She is the mother of singer Chloë Agnew from the group Celtic Woman.

== Career ==
=== Stage ===
King began singing and acting at the age of five. She was a Gaiety Kiddie and worked in pantomime with performers such as Jimmy O'Dea, Milo O'Shea and Maureen Potter. She was also a Young Dublin Singer, from which was formed the trio Maxi, Dick and Twink.

She has spent more than 30 years in Dublin's theatres: 26 years in the Gaiety Theatre, two years in the Point Theatre and five years in the Olympia Theatre. At the Olympia Theatre she co-produced and co-wrote much of the shows. She has been described as Ireland's 'Panto Queen'.

King has had roles in a number of theatrical productions in Ireland, including: Dirty Dusting at the Gaiety Theatre and Menopause: The Musical.was a member of the Irish showband The Big 8 from 1971 to 1974

=== Television ===
King has appeared on Irish television regularly since the late 1960s. She has starred in her own series Twink on RTÉ. She spent ten years on Play the Game, and has made many appearances as a guest on a wide range of programmes, including RTÉ's The Late Late Show, being the subject of a tribute on that show in 2005. She also was the subject of a weekend visit by the television programme Livin' with Lucy with Lucy Kennedy.

In 1993 she was the guest act at a Christmas concert by Perry Como at Dublin's Point Theatre, televised to a worldwide audience of 880 million.

In 2003 she took part in RTÉ's Celebrity Farm and in 2011, she won TV3's Celebrity Head Chef, receiving €10,000 for charity as a result.

She has written an agony aunt page for the Irish magazine TV Now. In 2011, she was given an agony aunt programme on TV3 called "Give Adele a Bell". However, after a delay, the programme was cancelled in June 2012 without an episode being made.

She won a Jacob's Award for her performance in her 1981 Christmas Light Entertainment Special on RTÉ Two.

=== Theatre school ===
King established a performance school in summer 2002, the Adèle King Theatre School in Castleknock and Greenhills. Pupils of the school have appeared on television, in films, and in commercials in Ireland and abroad. The school did not re-open for the 2008 autumn term.

She was accused of a conflict of interest over her marks for a contestant, known to her, on the talent show Class Act. Her reaction was: "If Osama bin Laden's son was on the programme and he threatened to send a big squad to my house if I didn't put his child through, I wouldn't."

== Personal life ==
Twink married oboist David Agnew in 1983 and had two children, Chloë in 1989, who sang with the group Celtic Woman, and Naomi in 1993.

Twink's marriage ended after 21 years, in October 2004. In February 2006, David Agnew (aged 46) had a baby with clarinetist Ruth Hickey (28). This prompted an infamous phone call from King (54) to ex-husband Agnew. She recorded a hostile message on his answering machine which appeared afterwards on the internet. The recording contained coarse and abusive language.

Twink described the Irish singer, Linda Martin, as a "cunt" during a tirade in May 2010. The two had been friends for 30 years but both said afterwards that they had no plans to speak to each other again.

Twink has pet dogs, cats, birds, and a donkey. She lives with her daughters in Knocklyon, Dublin. In April 2015 it was reported that David Agnew and Adele King face a bid by the Bank of Scotland to repossess a house which is mortgaged in both their names. The application for possession against Ms King had already previously been adjourned by the court.

In September 2014 it was widely reported across major Irish media outlets that Twink's dog, Teddy Bear, was kidnapped. Commenting on the events, Twink was distressed, and she noted positively on Linda Martin that she helps rescue dogs, and is "a very powerful woman in the dog world" and that the kidnapping marked her own personal "Erin Brockovich moment". On 24 September Twink was reunited with her dog after a public tip-off led to the police arrest of a man in Dublin.

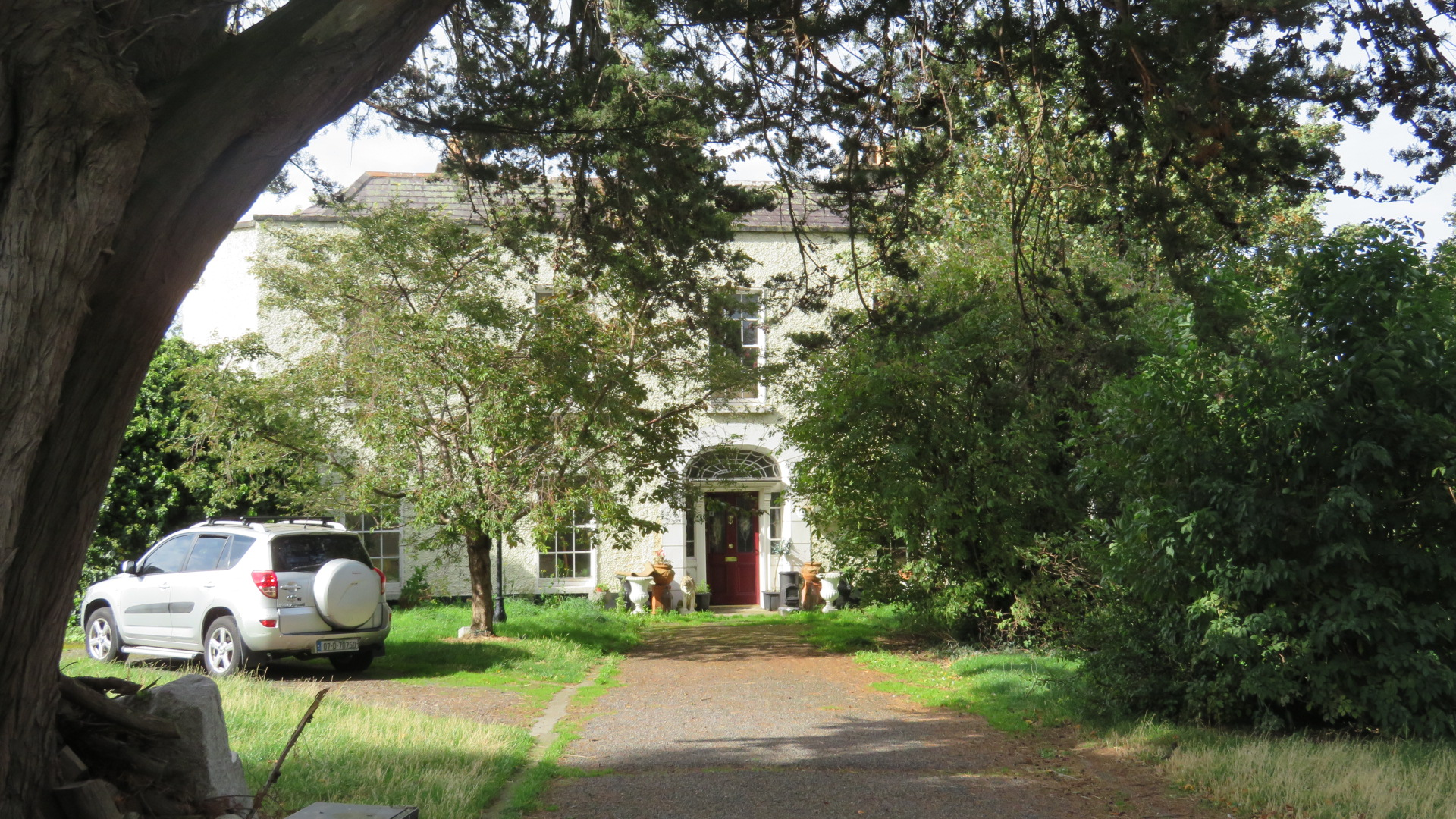
Idrone House is a detached two-storey house in Knocklyon, built circa 1790. It is indexed in the National Inventory of Architectural Heritage.

In April 2026, a new application by Pepper Finance to reposess Idrone House came before the Dublin County registrar. Neither she nor her husband turned up at the County registrar's court to meet the bank's application to take back and sell Idrone House. The house, worth €1.5 million in 2026 was bought in 2002 with the help of a €200,000 loan from Bank of Scotland. This loan, along with a loan of €30,000 taken out a couple of years later, were transferred through a series of lenders to Pepper Finance. County registrar Patricia Hickey said that as the new application had come before her for the first time, she would adjourn proceedings to July to allow King and her husband to consider their legal position. Legal council for Pepper Finance agreed to this.
