= Mount Anville Secondary School =

Private all-girls post-primary school in Goatstown, Ireland

Coordinates: 53.2933°N 6.2223°W

- Dublin; Ireland

Information
- Religious affiliation: Catholic Church
- Established: 1853; 173 years ago
- Gender: Girls
- Enrollment: 659
- Website: www.mountanville.ie

Mount Anville Secondary School is a Roman Catholic, voluntary all-girls post-primary school in Goatstown, a suburb of Dublin, in Ireland. It was originally an all-boarding school, but due to decreased demand for such schools has since become a day school. It has approximately 659 students, and is attached to Mount Anville Montessori Junior School and Mount Anville Convent.

It was established in 1853 by nuns of the Society of the Sacred Heart in the former home of William Dargan, an influential railway tycoon.

In 1967, the community and school of the Sacred Heart at 18 Lower Leeson Street were subsumed by the school which had earlier moved from Harcourt Street in 1879.

Mount Anville was once situated in north Dublin.

== Notable alumnae ==
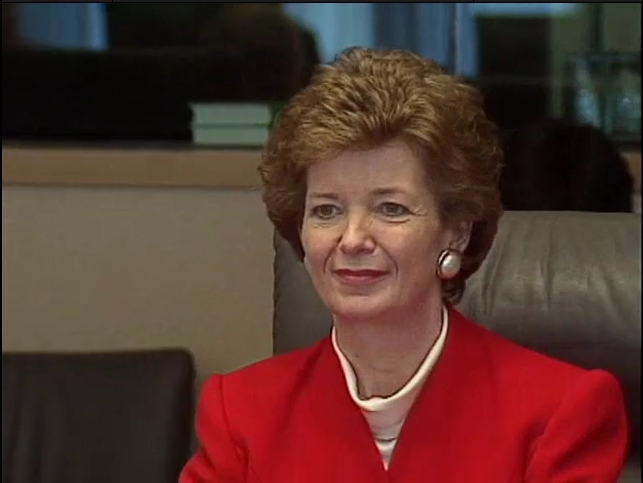
President Mary Robinson, Mount Anville past pupil

- Lisa Cannon, television presenter
- Caroline Casey, social entrepreneur
- Catherine Day, secretary general of the European Commission
- Alison Doody, actress
- Sheila Humphreys, political activist
- Kathleen MacMahon, journalist and novelist
- Emma Madigan, current Ambassador of Ireland to the Holy See
- Josepha Madigan, Irish politician, Minister for Culture, Heritage and the Gaeltacht
- Maria McCambridge, Olympic athlete
- Sybil Mulcahy, journalist
- Samantha Power, 28th US Ambassador to the United Nations (attended Mount Anville Montessori)
- Mary Robinson, the 7th (and first female) President of Ireland, United Nations High Commissioner for Human Rights (1997–2002)
- Veronica Ryan, founder of the first Irish Montessori school

== See also ==
- List of Schools of the Sacred Heart
