= Veronica Ryan (teacher) =

Irish teacher

- Born: 26 June 1921; Dublin, Ireland
- Died: 6 April 1966 (aged 44); Dublin
- Occupation: Teacher

Veronica Ryan (26 June 1921 – 6 April 1966) was an Irish teacher, founder and headmistress of the Children's House Montessori School. She created the first custom-built Montessori school in Ireland.

== Biography ==
Ryan was born in Dublin on 26 June 1921. Her parents were William (1875–1957), a distiller, and Philomena Ryan (died 1959), (née Smith-Steinmetz). She had one sister and two brothers including John Archibald, distiller and governor of the Bank of Ireland. She attended Sacred Heart Convent, Mount Anville, County Dublin, where her paternal aunt, Alice Ryan, was the reverend mother. She shared an interest in educating young children with her aunt Alice, who introduced her to Mother Veronica Power of the Sacred Heart School, Monkstown. Mother Power was interested in the work of Maria Montessori, and encouraged Ryan to visit Italy to learn more about Montessori teaching to inform the development of a new Montessori class at the Sacred Heart, Monkstown.

Ryan studied under Montessori from 1947 to 1948. Upon her return to Ireland, she ran a small Montessori school at the Sacred Heart School, Monkstown from 1948 to 1950. She decided that she wanted to establish an independent Montessori school, and at first she ran it from a series of rooms in her father's house from 1950 to 1952. Based on the success of the school, Ryan decided to build the first custom-built Montessori school in Ireland. She travelled to the Netherlands to purchase the proper teaching equipment. She persuaded her father to donate some land attached to his house to build the new school. The school, Children's House Montessori School, was opened in 1952 with Ryan as the first headmistress.

She built her home, Homefield, beside the school later. She lived there until her death on 6 April 1966 from pneumonia. Her school celebrated 50 years of Montessori education in 2002 and as of 2026 still operates.
