= Emma Doran =

Irish comedian, podcaster and actress

- Born: 1983 or 1984 (age 41–42); Dublin, Ireland
- Occupations: Comedian, podcaster

Emma Doran (born 1983 or 1984) is an Irish stand-up comedian, podcaster, and sketch comedian from Dublin.

She came to public attention with sketches on RTÉ's Republic of Telly and was a main cast member in the No Worries if Not! series. In January 2024, she was one of 10 comedians in Amazon Prime Video's LOL: Last One Laughing Ireland.

== Background ==
Doran is from Dublin, and lived in Tallaght in the early 1990s. Doran became pregnant with her first child during her final year of secondary school. She worked in community radio before pursuing a course in television production.

== Comedy career ==
Along with stand-up, Doran has created sketches on her Facebook and YouTube channels.

Doran has performed sketches for RTÉ2's Republic of Telly, and was a main cast member in the No Worries if Not! sketch show in 2022, with Michael Fry and Justine Stafford. She has been a guest in Foil Arms and Hog YouTube sketches.

During COVID-19 lockdown she focused on creating short form sketches online. In March 2022, Doran started a podcast, "You're Grounded" with her daughter Ella. She also co-hosts "And Another Thing!" with broadcaster Muireann O'Connell.

She is now the co-host of "Keep It Tight", with Deirdre O'Kane, a comedy podcast part of HeadStuff Podcast Network.
