= Family Fortunes (Irish game show) =

- Presented by: Alan Hughes
- Country of origin: Ireland
- No. of series: 3
- No. of episodes: 25

Original release
- Network: TV3 Ireland
- Release: 18 February 2012 – 24 March 2014

Related
- Family Feud

Alan Hughes' Family Fortunes is an Irish television game show, based on the American game show Family Feud and sharing the name of the British game show. Hosted by Alan Hughes, it aired on TV3 in Ireland on Saturday nights at 9 pm.

== Format ==
Two family teams, each with five members, would be asked to guess the results of surveys, in which 100 people would be asked open ended questions (e.g., "we asked 100 people to name something associated with the country Iceland" or "we asked 100 people to name a breed of dog"). Each round began with a member of each team (in rotation, meaning all players did this at least once) approaching the podium. As the question was read, the first of the two nominees to hit a buzzer gave an answer. If this was not the top answer, the other nominee was asked. The team with the higher answer then chose whether to "play" the question, or "pass" control to the other team (in reality, the teams rarely chose to pass). The host then passed down the line of the controlling team, asking for an answer from each. After each answer, the board revealed whether this answer featured. If a family managed to come up with all the answers on the board (most commonly six in the early part of the show, reduced in number after the commercial break), they won the euro equivalent of the total number of people who had given the answers.

Every time someone gave an answer that was not on the board or ran out of time, the family was charged a strike; accumulating three strikes meant the family lost control of the board, and the other family had the chance to steal, with only the head of the family giving one answer. If the answer was one of the remaining answers, they won the round and the money; otherwise, the opponents won the money that was on the board.

After the first half, answers were worth twice the score (i.e., €2). The family who scored the most euros played Big Money. The losing team's winnings would be doubled. Big Money awarded €1,000 (€2,500 on celebrity specials) for scoring 200 points. Naming all 5 top answers and scoring 200 points doubled said jackpot.

== Reception ==
Patrick Freyne, writing about the first episode in the Evening Herald, commented: "[Presenter Alan] Hughes gasped and goofed like a vat of fake tan, teeth-whitener and Just For Men which had come to life during a lightning storm".
