= Celia Holman Lee =

Irish model, fashion stylist and television presenter

Celia Holman Lee (born 2 December 1950) is an Irish model, fashion stylist and television presenter who was born in Ballynanty, Limerick City.

== Career ==
Celia Holman Lee started out as a model at the age of 15 while still at school after being approached while working as a shop assistant. She has been described by the Daily Mirror as having been "Ireland's most successful model". She founded her own modelling agency, Celia Holman Lee Model Agency, at the age of 22 and has run it for over 30 years, making it the longest running modelling agency in Ireland.
Celia Holman Lee made her first television appearance on The Late Late Show. She makes regular appearances on TV3, as well as regularly doing the fashion slot on Ireland AM. In 2010 she won the Celebrity Salon reality programme on TV3 at the age of 59 to be described as "Best in Beauty".

== Personal life ==
Holman Lee has lived in Limerick for the past 35 years with her husband Ger Lee. She was born in Ballynanty Limerick City. She has two children, Cecile, who works in the office at the modelling agency, and Ivan, and became a grandmother in 2008.
