= Martin King (broadcaster) =

Irish broadcaster (born 1963)

- Born: Martin Boyle; 7 January 1963 (age 63); Edenmore, Dublin, Ireland
- Occupation: Broadcaster
- Years active: 1978–present
- Employer(s): Virgin Media Television and Q102
- Agent: Noel Kelly
- Known for: TV3 Weather, The Morning Show with Sybil & Martin, Late Lunch Live, The Seven O'Clock Show, The Six O'Clock Show, Ireland AM
- Spouse: Jenny McCarthy (2011–)
- Children: 5

Martin Boyle (born 7 January 1963), known professionally as Martin King, is an Irish broadcaster who presents a radio show on Saturday afternoons on Q102. King was TV3's first weather anchor when it launched in 1998 and was the Monday to Thursday co-host of The Six O'Clock Show on Virgin Media One (formerly TV3). He currently presents the Fri

He is a client of Noel Kelly, of NK Management.

== Career ==
King got involved in radio when he was 15 years old working for pirate radio stations including Big D and Sunshine 101. He joined 98FM when it launched in 1989 where he was one of their main on-air personalities before becoming TV3's weather anchor when it launched on 20 September 1998. King also had his own Saturday morning show on Today FM from 2002 until 2017.

King's personality-driven style of weather forecasting on TV3 won King several awards and he was one of the main features of TV3's news presentation. He appeared as a guest on The Podge and Rodge Show on RTÉ Two in March 2006. As well as presenting weather bulletins, King has also presented a number of shows with TV3 such as Martin King's Commercial Breakdown in 2008 and along with Sybil Mulcahy, co-hosted The Morning Show with Sybil & Martin which ran from 2009 until it was axed in 2013.

King went on to co-host its replacement show called Late Lunch Live that was also co-hosted by Lucy Kennedy and Claire Solan. After TV3 lost the right to Emmerdale and Coronation Street to UTV Ireland in 2015, King became the Monday to Thursday co-host of The Seven O'Clock Show which air in the slot where Emmerdale and Coronation Street aired. When TV3 regained the rights to air Emmerdale and Coronation Street in 2016, after buying UTV Ireland, the show moved and became The Six O'Clock Show where King was the Monday to Thursday co-host. From 2017, King presented a daily Monday to Friday show on Q102. In November 2022, King left the Six O'Clock Show and joined Ireland AM on the weekends. In 2022, King announced that he would leave The Six O'Clock Show to join Elaine Crowley and Katja Mia as co-hosts of the Friday to Sunday editions of Ireland AM.

== Personal life ==
King lives in Rathfarnham in South County Dublin with photographer Jenny McCarthy and their children. They met when King was an 98FM presenter and McCarthy was one of the "Thunder Girls". They married in Killashee House Hotel in Naas, County Kildare, on 7 November 2011 and honeymooned in the Canaries.
