= Trinity Rooms =

Former nightclub in Limerick, Ireland

2 Michael Street
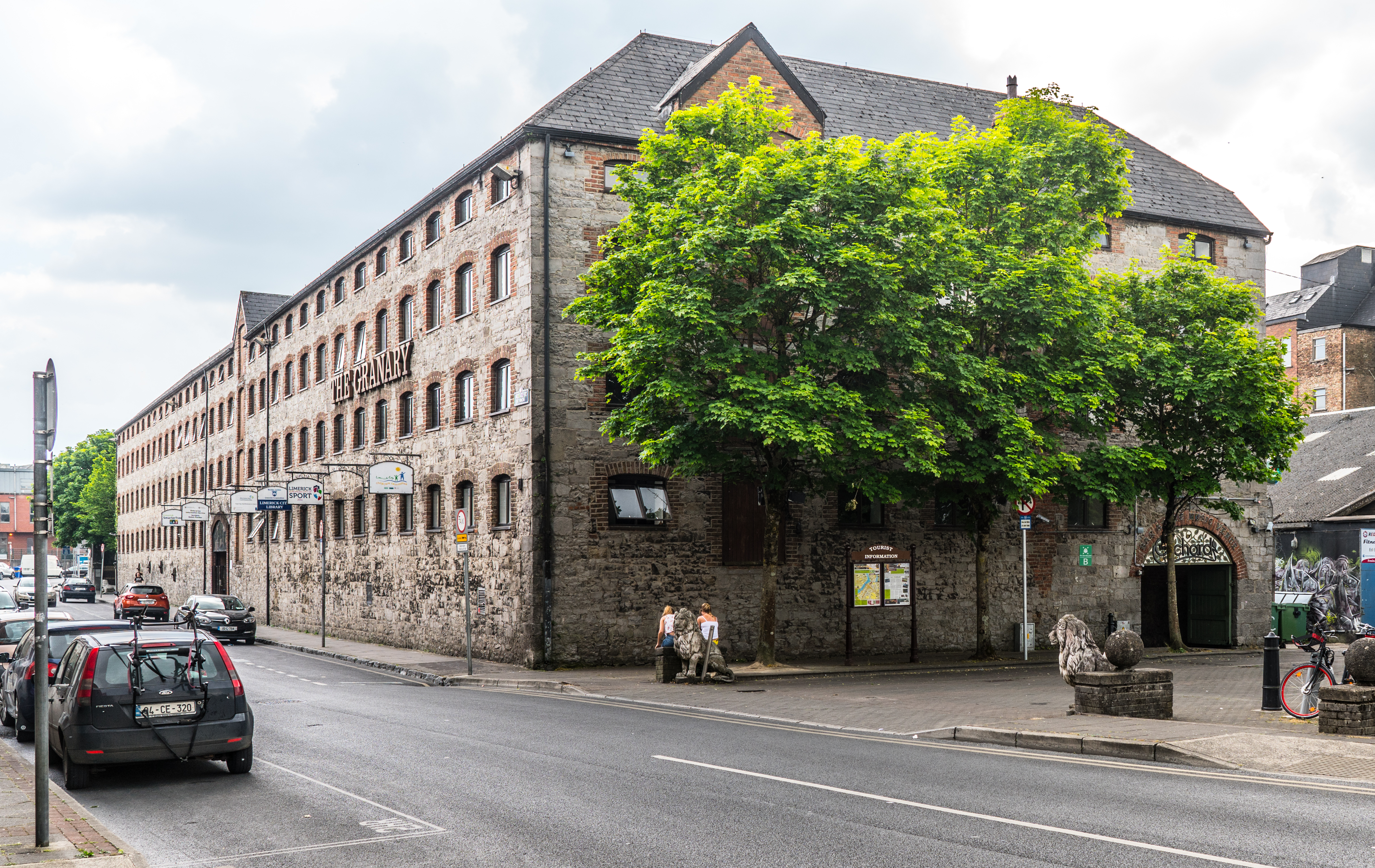
- The Granary building in 2016. One of the primary entrances to the Nightclub can be seen to the right.
- Interactive map of 2 Michael Street
- Former names: Schooners; Doc's Nightclub; Trinity Rooms; Crush 87; Habitat
- Address: 2 Michael Street (Bank Place), Granary Building; Limerick; Ireland
- Coordinates: 52°39′58″N 8°37′22″W
- Capacity: 1,485 (Trinity Rooms, at time of closure); approx. 2,000 (Doc's)
- Type: Nightclub

Construction
- Built: 1787 (as a granary building)
- Opened: 17 December 1993
- Renovated: c. late 1980s; 2003
- Closed: 2018
- Demolished: 2021
- Years active: 1993 to 2018
- Cost: £3 million (conversion from ganary in the 1980s); €6 million (Trinity Rooms redevelopment in 2003

2 Michael Street was a nightclub and entertainment venue located at the Granary Building on Bank Place in Limerick city, Ireland. Opening in the early 1990s, it traded under several names, most notably Trinity Rooms during the 2000s, but was also known at various points as Schooners, Doc's Nightclub, Crush 87, and Habitat. The venue closed permanently in the late 2010s and was demolished as part of the Limerick 2030 Opera Site development.

== Building history ==
The building was constructed in 1787 as a granary by the Limerick merchant Philip Roche, who built it to store grain for export through the neighbouring Limerick Docks. In later years it served as a bonded warehouse for liquor and tobacco before being acquired and redeveloped by Cooneen Ltd in the 1980s at a cost of £3 million.

== Early venue history: Schooners and Doc's (1993-2003) ==
The venue opened on 17 December 1993 under the name Doc's Nightclub, operated by owner Sean Doherty. With a capacity of nearly 2,000, it was at the time the largest nightclub in the west of Ireland. Situated next to the Granary building (an 18th-century bonded warehouse), it quickly established itself as the centre of Limerick's nightlife.

Manager Paul Ryan, who had come from the club scene in London, introduced practices that distinguished Doc's from rival venues. Each month, acts were booked through music manager Louis Walsh. Ryan also invested in a state-of-the-art laser system costing close to €250,000, which was described as unlike anything else in Ireland at the time. A smoke machine was also a notable feature. The venue also hosted annual "Back to School" parties, which drew queues stretching from the venue back past the Granary building as early as 4pm.

DJ Lorna Durbin (known professionally as Lorna D) served as one of the venue's resident DJs for ten years and was among the first female DJs in Limerick in the 1990s. She and fellow DJ Dave Hogan would travel to London on scouting trips to source new music. On one occasion, they received a pre-release record by artist Tom Wilson. After testing both sides, they reported that the first side was substandard. Wilson subsequently reworked the release, and the second side, "Techno Cat", became closely associated with the Doc's dancefloor.

The venue also attracted notable figures from the music industry. On one occasion, Louis Walsh contacted owner Sean Doherty to request entry for the recently formed Boyzone, who had been performing in the city. The request was declined on the grounds that the members were underage.

An early change to licensing laws required the venue to serve food. Chilli con carne became the standard offering, initially to the confusion of staff and patrons before gaining wider acceptance. Slow dancing, a fixture of Irish nightclub culture, was phased out at Doc's following Paul Ryan's return from a visit to the United States, where the practice was not common.

== Murder of Brian Fitzgerald (2002) ==
Brian Fitzgerald served as head of security at Doc's around the turn of the millennium. He was known for his firm opposition to drug dealing on the premises and reportedly resisted pressure from criminal gangs seeking access to the venue. A contract was placed on his life as a result.

On the night of 29 November 2002, Fitzgerald was shot dead by hitman James Martin Cahill as he arrived home from work. His wife Alice witnessed the attack while their two young children slept upstairs. The murder had a profound effect on the city and was followed by a period of increased gang activity in Limerick. The killing was cited as a direct factor in the decision by new owners to take over and extensively redevelop the venue.

Cahill, a hired English hitman, was paid €10,000 to carry out the killing. He was recruited after the criminal who ordered the murder (a senior figure in the McCarthy-Dundon gang) determined that a further conviction would result in his imprisonment, having already received a suspended sentence for violent disorder. Prior to the murder, Fitzgerald's home had been shot at in 2001, and his car had been destroyed with paint after he refused to allow gang-connected drug dealers access to the club. Fitzgerald had reported the threats to gardai. Cahill was later arrested in Dublin on an unrelated firearms charge and, fearing for his life in prison, confessed to the Fitzgerald murder in 2005. He was sentenced to life imprisonment that same year. At trial in 2007, Gary Campion of Moyross was found guilty of the murder, while Anthony Kelly and Dessie Dundon were acquitted. John Dundon had been acquitted by direction of the trial judge during proceedings.

== Trinity Rooms (2003-2011) ==
Following the closure of Doc's and a multi-million euro redevelopment, the venue reopened in July 2003 as Trinity Rooms, trading under Nightimer Ltd. It was described as a €6 million development and employed approximately 150 people at its peak. Joe Clarke, later chief executive of CWB Management, was among those who managed the venue during this period. At the grand opening in 2003, management arranged for a circus elephant to be paraded up Michael Street in order to demonstrate the massive size of the entrance.

The refurbished venue comprised three distinct areas within the original stone and brick warehouse structure. The main space was the Trinity Room, a nightclub area with a capacity of 700 people, featuring five individually designed bars, a pine dancefloor with mirrored pillars, and fibre-optic lighting. The Red Room, situated at an adjoining courtyard complete with its own waterfall, catered to soul and funk music. The Quarter Club served as a VIP area, decorated in cream and black leather with table service. Two outdoor courtyards were also part of the complex. Artwork by local artist Diarmuid O'Regan was displayed throughout the venue.

In December 2003, just months after opening, Judge Tom O'Donnell of Limerick District Court warned the owners that he would order the closure of the club if further breaches of licensing laws occurred. Gardai had reported five such breaches in the preceding six weeks.

At its height, Trinity Rooms attracted between 1,500 and 1,600 patrons three or four nights a week. Notable acts who performed there included Dave Clarke, Calvin Harris, the Fun Lovin' Criminals, Boy George, and Deadmau5. Staff during this era included Muireann O'Connell, who worked in the bathrooms and would later become a notable broadcaster in Ireland. The venue gained the nickname "Trooms" during this period.

In 2008, the club became the subject of a legal dispute when Limerick City Council issued a compulsory purchase order for the small plaza at the Bank Place entrance to the venue, as part of plans to facilitate the proposed €350 million Opera Centre development. Managing Director Pat Barry appealed the order to An Bord Pleanala, arguing that the plaza served as the primary access point, fire exit, and emergency assembly area. Barry contended that its removal would put him in breach of licensing conditions. The club had by this time received approval to increase its capacity to 1,485 patrons.

=== Closure ===
In June 2011, Trinity Rooms closed temporarily following concerns about what was claimed to be a rodent infestation at an adjacent derelict site earmarked for the stalled Opera Centre development. Management stated that the problem had been brought to the attention of Limerick City Council and the Health Service Executive, and that the venue had voluntarily closed. They noted that they had been raising concerns about the derelict site with the council for three and a half years before the closure. The environment department of Limerick City Council denied any such rodent infestion had occurred.

In August 2011, directors Tommy O'Doherty and Paddy Barry informed staff at a meeting that the club would not reopen and that all 50 employees (of whom close to 30 held full-time positions) were being made redundant. Staff members reported that management indicated an inability to pay statutory redundancy, directing affected workers to seek payment through government channels. A spokesperson for Trinity Rooms confirmed the closure but declined to comment on the redundancy matter, describing it as "of a very sensitive nature".

== Crush 87 and Habitat (2013 to 2018) ==
In July 2013, Savage Management Limited took over the lease on part of the Granary and obtained an ad interim transfer of a liquor licence, along with a dance licence, subject to the installation of CCTV to the satisfaction of gardai. The venue reopened as Crush 87.

== Demolition and redevelopment ==
The building at 2 Michael Street was demolished in late 2021. It was incorporated into the Opera Site, a €200 million urban development project forming part of the Limerick 2030 Plan. The completed campus is projected to include approximately 450,000 sq ft of office, educational, residential, library, retail, and hospitality space, as well as an aparthotel. The adjacent Granary building, which dates to the 18th century, was retained.
