= John Kennedy (Irish songwriter) =

Irish television personality

- Known for: composed Ireland's entry for Eurovision '68
- Partner: Separated
- Children: 3, including Lucy Kennedy

John Kennedy (fl. 1968, 2009) is an Irish television personality. He is the father of presenter Lucy Kennedy, whom he accompanies as a pianist on the 2009 RTÉ2 chat show The Lucy Kennedy Show. He is also known for composing Ireland's entry in the Eurovision Song Contest 1968. "Chance of a Lifetime", performed by Pat McGeegan, placed fourth in the competition but topped the Irish Singles Chart.
