= Ray Foley =

Irish broadcaster

- Born: Ballina, County Mayo, Ireland
- Education: Journalism degree
- Alma mater: Dublin Institute of Technology (DIT)
- Occupation: Disc jockey
- Employer: 98FM (2012–15)
- Known for: The Ray Foley Show; The Blast; The Essential Rock Anthems with Ray & JP
- Spouse: Kate Carolan
- Website: rayfoleyshow.blogspot.com

Raymond Foley is an Irish television host and radio presenter. Having worked at Dublin's 98FM and SPIN 1038 early in his career, Foley moved to Today FM in 2004. In 2006, he moved to midday and presented The Ray Foley Show, with sidekick JP Gilbourne and Adelle McDonnell. He hosted the breakfast slot on 98FM from October 2012 until December 2015. He also hosts TV dating show Take Me Out on TV3. On Friday 12 October 2012, Foley and JP announced on the show that both of them would be transferring to Today FM's sister station 98FM to present the breakfast show. They both have expressed how difficult the decision was for them, due to their fondness of their workmates and friends in Today FM. In 2022, Foley returned to Today FM with an afternoon show.

== Early career ==
Following an entry in the DJ For a Day competition on 2FM (on Tony Fenton's Hotline show) in 1997, Foley got a taste for broadcasting. This led to him beginning his studies as a journalist in Dublin Institute of Technology, from which he graduated in October 2004 While there he started working at East Coast FM, and thence moved to 98FM and as a newsreader on Lite FM, before moving to SPIN 1038, "to get re-acquainted with presenting again". While there, he presented The Zoo Crew with Clionadh O'Leary on week nights.

== Today FM career ==
In 2004 Foley moved to Today FM and began presenting late night show, The Blast with his college friend, JP Gilbourne, from Dundalk. Foley and JP regularly filled-in for Ray D'Arcy, Tony Fenton and Tom Dunne during this time. When the radio schedule was changed in 2006, Foley moved to a midday slot, which was vacated by Tony Fenton. Foley was disciplined by Irish authorities when he broadcast the Lily Allen song "Fuck You Very Much" on lunchtime radio in 2008.

=== Today FM afternoon show (2006–2012, 2022-present) ===
The Ray Foley Show
- Genre: Chat / music
- Running time: 14:00 - 16:30
- Country of origin: Ireland
- Language(s): English
- Home station: Today FM
- Recording studio: Marconi House, Digges Lane, Dublin 2
- Original release: 2022
- Audio format: FM and Digital radio
- Website: Official site
- Podcast: Ray Foley Show Podcast

For 6 years Foley broadcast during the afternoon on Today FM, directly after The Ray D'Arcy Show. The tagline for the show was "Just a bit of fun for your lunchtime, nothing too serious". The show consisted of taking calls from listeners on random topics, chart music and some regular spots, along with the National Lunchtime News. Sometimes contributors included Ann Gleeson, Alan Metcalfe (Funky Phone Boy Al) and reviewer Eoghan Doherty (Nordy Eoghan).

Following a nearly decade long hiatus from the station, Foley and Gilbourne returned to Today FM to present Ray Foley on weekday afternoon from the 14th of February 2022.

=== Essential Rock Anthems ===
In 2009, Foley and JP presented The Essential Rock Anthems in "The Essential..." slot on Sunday nights. They presented two further shows, which then became a regular almost monthly feature of the slot. In November 2009, Ray Foley and JP's Essential Rock Anthems CD was launched, a two-CD collection, including tracks from artists such as Meat Loaf, Therapy?, Pixies, Thin Lizzy, Whitesnake, Motörhead, Placebo, Blondie, Radiohead, The Knack, Status Quo, The Jam and Journey.

== 98FM (2012–2015) ==
On 12 October 2012, it was announced that Ray and JP were leaving Today FM to host the breakfast show on 98FM.

On 22 December 2015 the Irish Independent reported that his 98FM show would finish up on 24 December. He has since been replaced by Steven Cooper and Luke O'Faolain.

== TV3/Virgin Media career ==
Foley moved into television presentation. He became the Irish Paddy McGuinness by presenting Take Me Out. Seán Munsanje from Xposé took him shopping to style him for the job. He was also mentioned in relation to The Apprentice: You're Fired!.

From 2015 to 2022, Foley presented the Friday edition of The 6 O'Clock Show on the renamed Virgin Media One. He has since occasionally presented Ireland AM.

== Awards ==
Foley won a Meteor Music Award for Best National DJ in 2008, 2009 and again in 2010. Foley celebrated winning the 2008 award by singing a version of Journey's "Don't Stop Believin'", and in 2009 with the theme tune to TV's Home and Away as part of his acceptance speech. In 2008 he launched a successful daily campaign to dethrone namesake Ray D'Arcy.

Foley achieved the PPI Radio Award's Music Broadcaster of the Year Award in 2009 and 2010. Also in 2009 Foley and JP won the award for Best Specialist Music Programme for their Sunday evening show, The Essential Rock Anthems with Ray & JP.

Year	Nominee / work	Award	Result
2008	Ray Foley	Best Irish DJ at the Meteor Awards	Won
2009	Ray Foley	Best Irish DJ at the Meteor Awards	Won
2009	Ray Foley	Music Broadcaster of the Year Award at the PPI Irish Radio Awards	Won
2009	Ray Foley and JP	Best Specialist Music Programme at the PPI Irish Radio Awards	Won
2010	Ray Foley	Best Irish DJ at the Meteor Awards	Won
2011	Ray Foley	Music Broadcaster of the Year at the PPI Irish Radio Awards	Nominated
2012	Ray Foley	Music Broadcaster of the Year at the PPI Irish Radio Awards	Nominated
2012	Ray Foley	General Music Programme at the PPI Irish Radio Awards	Nominated
2013	Ray Foley	Music Broadcaster of the Year at the PPI Irish Radio Awards	Nominated

== Personal life ==
Foley married RTÉ 2fm newsreader Kate Carolan in 2007. They met while working at SPIN 1038. He proposed to Carolan on O'Connell Street in Dublin City Centre and they spent their honeymoon attending the Oxegen Music Festival. On Monday 2 April 2012, Foley announced on-air that Kate had given birth to their first child on 1 April 2012. Foley announced the birth of their second child in June 2014.
