= The Morning Show with Sybil & Martin =

- Genre: Morning news and talk show
- Presented by: Martin King; Sybil Mulcahy
- Country of origin: Ireland
- Original language: English

Production
- Running time: 60 minutes

Original release
- Network: TV3
- Release: 11 May 2009 – 27 September 2013

Related
- Late Lunch Live, Extended Ireland AM; Ireland AM, Midday, Xposé

The Morning Show with Sybil & Martin is a morning magazine show that aired on TV3 in Ireland. It launched on 11 May 2009 as part of a major overhaul of daytime programming on the channel. The programme aired live at 11:00 on weekdays, and was hosted by Sybil Mulcahy and Martin King. It focused on a variety of topical issues, such as healthcare, current affairs, entertainment, and real life stories. It also ran a number of competitions, which gave viewers the chance to become an author of their own published book, or to show off their unique talents such as singing and dancing. In February 2012, it was announced that Claire Brock would replace Sybil Mulcahy while the latter was on maternity leave.

== Cancellation ==
On 26 July 2013, the Irish Independent reported that The Morning Show would be axed and replaced with a new afternoon programme. On 15 August, the TV3 Group confirmed that the show had been cancelled. TheJournal.ie obtained a memo, allegedly sent to TV3 staff by the TV3 Group's management, which criticised those who might have leaked information to the press about future changes at the broadcaster.
