= Anna Daly =

Irish television presenter

- Born: 30 March 1977 (age 48)
- Career
- Show: Ireland AM and Weekend AM
- Network: TV3
- Show: Hospital Live and Future Island
- Network: RTÉ
- Country: Ireland

Anna Daly (born 10 March 1977) is an Irish television and radio presenter. She worked for TV3 from 2008-2021 and was a presenter on TV3's breakfast show , Ireland AM and former weekend breakfast show Weekend AM.

Daly was born in Dublin and graduated with an international marketing degree from the Marketing Institute of Ireland. She spent four years working in sponsorship and marketing for TV3, eventually becoming the station's Marketing Manager.

She married Ben Ward in Portugal in September 2008. They have three sons.

In 2008, Daly was nominated for Image Magazine's Young Business Woman of the Year. She has also won at the TV Now Awards.

In 2021 Daly moved from Virgin Media Television to the national broadcaster RTÉ, presenting shows including Hospital Live, Future Island and Zoo Live TV series.
