= The Lucy Kennedy Show =

Irish television program

- Genre: Chat show
- Starring: Lucy Kennedy; John Kennedy
- Country of origin: Ireland
- Original language: English
- No. of series: 1
- No. of episodes: 5

Original release
- Network: RTÉ Two
- Release: 6 January – 3 February 2009

The Lucy Kennedy Show is an Irish chat show hosted by Lucy Kennedy. Her father, John Kennedy, accompanies her in studio, where he performs the role of pianist. Each episode involves Lucy Kennedy interviewing two guests and dressing up as a well-known personality to perform a sketch. It began airing on 6 January 2009. The show was poorly received by critics during its opening week.

Kennedy described her show as "Livin' with Lucy in a studio" and "a bit like The Charlotte Church Show gone wrong". Kennedy added the new show to her workload on top of co-presenting with Colm Hayes on an Irish Radio Nova 100FM.

== Episode list ==
Date	Guests	Panel	Sketch	Ref
6 January 2009	Ryan Tubridy, PJ Gallagher		Amy Winehouse/Bryan Dobson	
13 January 2009	Jason Donovan, Clelia Murphy	Joe O'Shea; Evelyn O'Rourke; Paddy Courtney		
20 January 2009	Shayne Ward, Daithí Ó Sé			
27 January 2009	Julie Goodyear, Claire Richards			
3 February 2009	Keith Duffy, Janet Street-Porter			

The person in italics is not actually real and is played by Lucy Kennedy.

== Reaction ==
The Lucy Kennedy Show came in for much criticism from Ireland's leading television critics; however, views have varied. The Mirror TV analyst Maeve Quigley had previously chosen the show as her 'Pick of The Week', promoting the show to her readers. John Boland of the Irish Independent dubbed the show "meaningless, unfunny codology" during which "nothing got said", "a show about nothing" akin to Seinfeld "minus the laughs". He criticised the culture of RTÉ employees interviewing RTÉ employees, pointing out that first guest Ryan Tubridy had already interviewed his host on his own show Tubridy Tonight. The "cod-interview" which newscaster Bryan Dobson spent time conducting with Kennedy also came in for some criticism, with life being "too short" to explain why she was masquerading as Amy Winehouse and he was risking forfeiting the respect he had earned for "his authority and gravitas" throughout his previously professional life. He also began to wonder why John Kennedy was there at all and lamented not being told that he had once written the Irish entry for the Eurovision Song Contest.

Pat Stacey of the Evening Herald was just as forthcoming with his own criticism. He described the show as a "post-Christmas turkey" before adding that he found it difficult to locate sentences to convey the "sheer badness". Stacey discussed the appliance of numerous words such as lazy, shoddy, inept or embarrassing but, finding that as a matter of opinion each of these words only told of various segments within the show, settled instead on "excruciating", the "good, solid, blanket word to cover all bases". The opening monologue was said to be "excruciating and unfunny" and "delivered in that klutzy, amateurish style that supposedly makes Lucy so endearing but which, in reality, merely irritates to the point where your teeth itch". The Dobson sketch was declared "excruciating and embarrassing" and "dim". The "non-interview" with Tubridy was panned but Tubridy "the only person working for RTÉ who knows the first bloody thing about how to present a proper chat show" was praised for being "ever chivalrous" by "going through the motions" even more so than if he had "poked his own poo with a stick".

== Viewing figures ==
In its second week on air, The Lucy Kennedy Show was said by the Evening Herald to be attracting three times the viewing figures of This is Nightlive which ran in the same slot on Monday nights, though the context of this comparison against what a good figure would be was not provided; by context, the Herald noted that viewing figures for This is Nightlive were dismal and were said to be declining by the week, with the first episode attracting 89,000 and the second episode attracting 76,000.
