= Conor Pope =

Irish journalist, author and broadcaster (born 1968)

- Born: 3 August 1968 (age 57); Galway, County Galway, Ireland
- Occupation: Journalist
- Known for: "Pricewatch" in The Irish Times and on The Ray D'Arcy Show

Conor Pope (born 3 August 1968) is an Irish journalist, author and broadcaster who works for The Irish Times as well as appearing on radio and television as a consumer advocate.

Pope is the consumer affairs correspondent with the Times and writes the weekly Pricewatch page in The Irish Times as well as occupying a segment of the same name on The Ray D'Arcy Show on RTÉ Radio 1. He has also had a weekly slot on TV3's Six O'Clock Show, and is the presenter of Conor Pope's Consumer 999 on the same channel.

== Early life ==
Born in Galway, Pope moved with his family to County Cork when he was six and they returned when he was thirteen. He studied English and Philosophy at University College Galway (UCG). Upon graduating, he took a programming course in FÁS, then worked at the Connacht Tribune as placement.

== Career ==
In 1996, Pope joined The Irish Times, becoming involved with the paper's website.

Pope wrote a consumer advice book (Stop Wasting Your Money; Liberty Press), which was published in 2007, and contributed to two consumer-related shows on RTÉ Television in 2007 and 2009.

In 2012, as part of his job, he rang into TV3's Psychic Readings Live and asked Psychic Wayne about a concern he felt that someone he is connected to in his job was stealing money belonging to other people. He was promptly cut off.

He has supported a campaign to erect a statue in Galway in memory of Che Guevara, who was partly descended from the Lynch family of Galway. This was the subject of controversy when American politicians commented unfavourably on the proposed memorial.
