= Weekend AM =

Television series

- Genre: Morning news and talk show
- Presented by: Anna Daly; Simon Delaney; Laura Woods; Aidan Power
- Country of origin: Republic of Ireland
- Original languages: English; Irish

Production
- Production locations: Virgin Media Television HD Studio, Ballymount, Dublin
- Running time: 180 mins (including advertising)
- Production company: Virgin Media Television

Original release
- Network: Virgin Media One
- Release: 29 August 2015 – present

Related
- Ireland AM

Weekend AM (stylised as Weekend:am) is an Irish morning television show on Virgin Media One, that was first broadcast as "Saturday AM" on 29 August 2015 at 09:00, with "Sunday AM" beginning the following day.

== Development ==
Following the success of Ireland AM and an absence of live breakfast television on the weekends, the TV3 Group (now Virgin Media Television) confirmed in June 2015, it would introduce a weekend slot to its schedule.

It was confirmed Ireland AM presenter Anna Daly would move to the new weekend slot and present alongside Ivan Yates and Laura Woods. The show broadcasts between 09:00 to 12:00 each Saturday and Sunday. The programme features news, current affairs, weather updates and analysis of the weekend newspapers with in-studio guests.

On 30 August 2018, to coincide with the rebranding of TV3 to "Virgin Media One", Ireland AM launched a new set, and the Saturday and Sunday editions of the programme were renamed as "Weekend AM".

From the week starting 7 October 2019, Ireland AM started airing 5 days a week, meaning Weekend AM was suppose to be rebranded to Ireland AM. But It Survived.

== Presenters ==
- Anna Daly (2015–2021)
- Simon Delaney (2015–2022)
- Laura Woods (2015–2021)
- Aidan Power co-host and sport (2019–2021)

News and weather

- Hannah Murphy
- Mairead Cleary
- Geraldine Lynagh
- Anne O'Donnell
- Aisling Roche
- Former presenters
- Tommy Martin (2015–2018)
- Ivan yates (2015-2016)
