= Lucy Kennedy =

Irish presenter

- Born: 21 April 1976 (age 50); Sandycove, Dublin, Ireland
- Education: University College Dublin
- Occupations: Television Presenter; Radio Presenter; Journalist
- Employer(s): Ireland’s Classic Hits Radio & Virgin Media Television
- Known for: The Podge and Rodge Show; Livin' with Lucy; The Lucy Kennedy Show; The Colm and Lucy Show
- Height: 5 ft 4 in (163 cm)
- Spouse: Richard Governey (m. 2008)
- Children: 3
- Relatives: John Kennedy (father)

Lucy Kennedy (Irish: Lusaí Ní Chinnéide; born 21 April 1976) is an Irish television, radio presenter and children's book author.

Kennedy first came to public attention from co-hosting The Podge and Rodge Show on RTÉ Two. She has also presented the dating show The Ex-Files, the celebrity show Livin' with Lucy, her own chat show The Lucy Kennedy Show and the reality boxing show Charity Lords of the Ring. She is doing full-time radio work, The Colm and Lucy breakfast Show on Ireland's Classic Hits Radio. She presented The Six O'Clock Show on TV3.

== Early life ==
Kennedy grew up in Sandycove, Dublin, the middle child of three girls. Her father is John Kennedy who would later feature alongside his daughter as her pianist on The Lucy Kennedy Show.

Lucy attended Holy Child Killiney secondary school. Kennedy's first career was as a flight attendant with Cityjet, followed by a course in television presenting and production. In 2002, she worked as a contestant researcher for an Irish version of The Weakest Link. She later worked as a production assistant on An Tuath Nua and production co-ordinator on A Scare at Bedtime and briefly worked in sales for SPIN 1038.

== Television presenter ==
Kennedy began presenting two series of The Ex-Files in 2004 and was approached to co-host The Podge and Rodge Show in February 2006. She described the duo as "like the older brothers I never had" but left the show after three series. In 2007, Kennedy made numerous television appearances on other shows such as No Frontiers and People in Need Telethon, as well as winning the TV Now Award for Female Personality of the Year.

In April – May 2008, Kennedy featured in her own show, Livin' with Lucy, the premise of which she shared a house with celebrities such as Brian McFadden and Calum Best for a weekend. The show aired on RTÉ2 on Monday nights. During the show she was hunted by the paparazzi and the press when she stayed with the British reality-television personality Jade Goody. Kennedy encountered controversy whilst staying with Samantha Mumba when Mumba launched a verbal attack on Irish radio presenter Dave Fanning using expletives.

Kennedy presented The Ian Dempsey Breakfast Show when regular host Ian Dempsey was absent on 18 July 2008.

Kennedy was subject to speculation that she would take over the role of host of travel series No Frontiers from Kathryn Thomas but this did not come to pass.

Her chat show, The Lucy Kennedy Show, an inhouse RTÉ production, began on 6 January 2009. Her father John was her pianist on the show. She co-presented Charity Lords of the Ring alongside Barry McGuigan in August 2009. After this she took maternity leave. She began filming the third series of Livin' with Lucy in July 2010.

In September 2013, Kennedy began co-hosting Late Lunch Live alongside weatherman Martin King. Late Lunch Live replaced The Morning Show. In February 2014, she signed a contract with Virgin Media One (formerly TV3). Late Lunch Live subsequently became The Seven O'Clock Show in 2015, and now airs as The Six O'Clock Show due to the return of Emmerdale and Coronation Street to Virgin Media One in 2016.

On 30 August 2017, it was announced that Kennedy would host Ireland's Got Talent. She hosted two series of Ireland's Got Talent until its cancellation in 2019.

== Radio presenter ==
Kennedy had a "recent stint" in RTÉ 2fm with Bazil Ashmawy.

On 7 May 2010, it was announced she would co-present with Colm Hayes for one month the 9 am – 12 noon slot vacated by the death of Gerry Ryan. However, she was not given the job permanently stating that she did not have the necessary experience for it.

She did Weekend Breakfast with Baz & Lucy. This is a "less visible" role in the organisation that is RTÉ. On 18 April 2018 Lucy co-hosted the first edition of a new breakfast show on Radio Nova 100FM (Ireland) with Colm Hayes, called The Colm and Lucy Breakfast Show. (Colm Hayes had joined Radio Nova 100FM as its Programming Director in June 2017.) Some months prior to this launch, they had presented a one-off show on Radio Nova 100FM.

Colm & Lucy moved to Ireland’s Classic Hits Radio from sister station radio Nova in late March Colm & Lucy become the new weekday breakfast show presenters at Ireland’s Classic Hits Radio.

== Children's book author ==
Kennedy has authored The Friendship Fairies series of books debuting in 2020. Kennedy has published five books in the series, each illustrated by Phillip Cullen.

== Personal life ==
Kennedy is married to Richard Governey; the couple have three children, two daughters and a son. She models her mother/career-oriented lifestyle on that of Miriam O'Callaghan.

== Awards ==
Kennedy won Favourite Female TV Presenter at the 2009 TV Now Awards.

Year	Nominee / work	Award	Result
2009	Lucy Kennedy	Favourite Female TV Presenter	Won
