= Sybil Mulcahy =

Irish journalist and presenter (born 1974)

- Born: Sybil Mulcahy; 1974 (age 51–52); Ballsbridge, Dublin, Ireland
- Education: Bachelor of Arts; H.Dip in Applied Communications
- Alma mater: University College Dublin; University College Galway
- Occupations: Journalist; news presenter
- Years active: 1994–present
- Notable credit(s): TV3 News; Xposé; The Morning Show with Sybil & Martin
- Children: Three

Sybil Mulcahy (born 1973) is an Irish journalist and presenter, known for co-presenting TV3's The Morning Show with Sybil & Martin since 2009.

== Early life ==
Born in Ballsbridge, Dublin, Mulcahy was educated locally before being conferred with a Bachelor of Arts from University College Dublin. She subsequently attended University College Galway, where she attained a H.Dip in Applied Communications. She has also completed a marketing diploma.

== Career ==
She began her broadcasting career in San Diego in the mid-1990s, where she worked on the Education Channel as a reporter and editor in a CBS affiliate. She returned to Ireland in 1999 where she joined TV3. She worked with the station's news division and spent several years as entertainment reporter. In 2007 Mulcahy joined TV3's entertainment show Xposé as a reporter. She spent two years with that programme before leaving in 2009 to co-present The Morning Show with Martin King.

== Personal life ==
Mulcahy married in 2004 and divorced in 2022 and is now in a long term relationship.

In February 2015, she decided to take redundancy and to operate at TV3 in a freelance contract (rather than fulltime employee) capacity.
