= Xposé =

Irish TV series

- Genre: Entertainment, newsmagazine
- Presented by: Lorraine Keane (2007–2009); Karen Koster (2007–2019); Aisling O'Loughlin (2007–2016); Lisa Cannon (2007–2016); Sybil Mulcahy (2007–2009); Glenda Gilson (2008–2019); Sean Munsanje (2009–2010); Kirsteen O'Sullivan (2011); Michelle Doherty (2013–2014); Peter O'Riordan (2014–2016); Cassie Stokes (2016–2019); Ruth O'Neill (2016–2017); Darren Kennedy (2017-2019); Ivan Yates (unknown); Vincent Browne (2015); Jedward (2015); Jonathan Cheban (2017); Richard Keatley (unknown); Blathnaid Treacy (2018-2019) others
- Country of origin: Ireland
- Original language: English

Production
- Production locations: Virgin Media Television HD Studio, Ballymount, Dublin
- Running time: 22 minutes (2007–2014, 2016–2019); 45 minutes (2014–2016, 2019)

Original release
- Network: TV3 (2007–2017), Virgin Media Two (2017–2019)
- Release: 16 April 2007 – 4 October 2019

Related
- Ireland AM; Midday; Late Lunch Live

Xposé was a entertainment, fashion and beauty programme that aired on Irish television from 2007 to 2019.

It was broadcast every Friday at 18:00 on Virgin Media One. It ran for a 3-day week at 20:00 on Virgin Media Two (previously known as "3e"). It originally aired weekdays for 30 minutes, with advertising; later it broadcast for 60 minutes, with advertising.

== History and format ==
The show was first broadcast on 16 April 2007, at 6pm, with an initial budget of €600,000. TV3 News @ 6.30 was axed, in order to make room in the schedule for the show, with Hollyoaks moving to 6.30 before it was later axed and replaced with Friends. Lorraine Keane's entertainment update on TV3 News broadcasts was also removed.

The show's format was similar to that of American celebrity news and gossip programmes, such as E! News and Entertainment Tonight, covering events and celebrities in the entertainment industry. It was produced in-house by Virgin Media with a team of reporters conducting the interviews and attending various events. On rare occasions guests could appear in the studio. Xposé primarily focused on celebrity life in Ireland and around the world. Reporters covered home events including top awards ceremonies, film premieres, rock and pop concerts, fashion shows and interviews with Irish and international stars.

Regular segments on the show included the "Daily Dish" (a look at the major celebrity news stories), make-up tips with Jemma Kidd and Fashion Police. Each episode finished by playing a music video. Mobile phone company 3 Ireland sponsored the show from its first time on air. On 27 April 2009, the first week following Lorraine Keane's departure from the show, it opened with a new graphical set using a greenscreen this provided a number of additional virtual screens behind the presenter in the studio, this replaced the physical set and screens between 2007 and 2009.

On 8 September 2014 Xposé was extended to one hour. The show received a new studio and graphics revamp and broadcasts from its new purposely built studio at the Sony HD Studios in Dublin. On 5 September 2016 the show returned to a 30-minute edition.

On 16 December 2016 TV3 announced a major revamp of their schedule. It was announced that Xposé would be shown three nights a week on TV3 and feature two nights a week on sister channel, 3e. This came into effect in January 2017.

On 8 March 2019 Xposé returned to Virgin Media One, airing each Friday night replacing The Six O'Clock Show's Friday night episode.

On 24 September 2019, it was confirmed that the show would be cancelled on 4 October by Virgin Media after 12 years on the air.

=== Ratings ===
In February 2016, it was reported in the Irish Independent that Xposé reached 185,000 viewers each night. According to TV3, the show was getting more than 100,000 viewers each weeknight.

== Presenting team ==
Final Presenters

- Karen Koster
- Ruth O'Neill
- Glenda Gilson
- Cassie Stokes
- Darren Kennedy

Previous Line-up

The presenting team originally consisted of Lorraine Keane in the studio with Karen Koster, Aisling O'Loughlin, Lisa Cannon and Sybil Mulcachy as reporters. During 2008 Mulcahy left the show for a six months for maternity leave. She was replaced by Glenda Gilson. Following the return of Mulcahy, TV3 bosses announced plans to continue with six presenters. In early April 2009, however, it was announced that Mulcahy was leaving the show to present a new morning chatshow titled The Morning Show.

On 21 April 2009, it was announced that the main presenter of the show Lorraine Keane was to leave the series. Media outlets stated that Keane had disagreed with TV3 management on the future direction of the show. Both Keane and TV3 refuted this. She did criticise the decision to remove her image from the TV3 website almost immediately after her resignation. On Friday 24 April 2009, she presented her final episode.

From 27 April 2009, Karen Koster was the main presenter in the studio. She was usually joined by another presenter in the studio for the "Daily Dish" segment. Glenda Gilson or Lisa Cannon usually rotated the job of the "Daily Dish" while Aisling O' Loughlin presented it occasionally. During May 2009 Aisling O'Loughlin presented the main show in different parts of Ireland.

On 5 July 2010, it was announced that Sean Munsanje was to leave the show at the end of August, a year after he won the reality TV competition Total Xposure.

On 24 November 2011, it was announced that Kirsteen O'Sullivan had joined the Xposé girls.

Peter O'Riordan became the second male to become part of Xposé's all-female team in 2014. He previously worked for TMZ.

In April 2016, Cassie Stokes was announced as a new presenter, providing cover for Karen Koster and Aisling O'Loughlin, who were both going on maternity leave.

Darren Kennedy was announced as a special guest host in July 2017.

In August 2016, it was confirmed by the TV3 Group three presenters were axed from the show including long-term presenters Lisa Cannon and Aisling O'Loughlin and Peter O'Riordan who joined the show in 2014.

== Other versions ==
=== Total Xposure ===
In June 2009, TV3 launched the reality television series Total Xposure which auditioned aspiring presenters to replace Lorraine Keane on the show. The finalists faced the team of Michael O'Doherty, Emma Ledden and Gerry Lundberg on the judging panel. Over the course of the show, the contestants completed a number of tasks relating to potentially joining the Xposé team. The first hour-long show aired on 30 June and ran for eight consecutive weeks. Sean Munsanje won the show on 18 August.

=== Xposé Live ===
This live version of the show took place from 8–10 May 2009 in the RDS in Dublin.
