= Alan Hughes (presenter) =

Irish television presenter

Alan Hughes (born 19 October 1963) is an Irish television personality, pantomime actor and producer. He works for Virgin Media and appears on Ireland AM. He also hosted Family Fortunes from 2012 to 2014.

In the 1990s, he hosted the RTÉ game show Talk About for three years.

Since the 1990s, Hughes has co-produced and starred in pantomimes, usually set around Christmas, and usually playing the camp character Sammy Sausages with his "tanx a thousand!" catchphrase.

In 2009, Hughes faced a health scare when there were fears he had stomach cancer.

In September 2011, Hughes engaged in a civil partnership with his partner of 18 years, Karl Broderick, a songwriter, at the Unitarian Church in St Stephen's Green, Dublin. The wedding, on the 18th anniversary of their meeting, was described by The Irish Times as the highest profile wedding since legislation permitting it to take place was brought in. Close friend Derek Mooney was his best man. The couple appeared on The Saturday Night Show soon afterwards in their first public interview together.

Hughes was nominated in the Favourite Male TV Presenter category at the 2009 TV Now Awards.

== Panto.ie ==
Hughes and husband Broderick, as Panto.ie/Anthem productions, have produced pantomimes since the 1990s. It was known for sponsorship reasons as the Ambrosia Splat Panto, and the Cheerios Panto. Hughes usually plays the camp character Sammy Sausages with his "tanx a thousand!" catchphrase, with Rob Murphy playing Buffy.

Venues have included the Tivoli, Saint Anthony's Theatre, Liberty Hall Theatre, and the National Stadium. Productions in 2020 and 2021 were affected by the impact of COVID-19. For 2020, a drive-in show, Peter Pan, was staged at Malahide Castle. In 2020, Hughes, Broderick, and Cheerios announced that their partnership was coming to an end. According to Aisling Curran, marketing manager for Nestle Cereals, the original three-year partnership turned into fourteen years. The 2021/22 production Aladdin, was curtailed due to a spike in infections.

Funding was almost lost in 2020 when a "technical error" meant Hughes and Broderick hat to halt their 2020 production process. The company had applied for the Live Performance Scheme, which aimed to help entertainment up and running again after COVID-19. The Department of Tourism, Culture and Arts stated the original application was initially missing attachments. When that hurtle was cleared, Anthem productions was told that they were denied funds "because these accounts were not submitted." Broderick wrote Regina Doherty, a Fine Gael senator, to get clarification. After looking into the issue, the Department of Tourism, Culture and Arts awarded the money, much to the delight of Hughes and the cast and crew of that years' production.

Productions have included performances by Brian Dowling, Nadia Forde, Jake Carter, Niamh Kavanagh and pre-recorded pieces by broadcasters Joe Duffy and Marty Morrissey.
