= Aisling O'Loughlin =

Irish journalist

- Born: 1978 (age 47–48); Shannon, County Clare, Ireland
- Education: Dublin City University (DCU)
- Occupations: News reader, presenter
- Years active: 1998-present
- Notable credit(s): TV3 News; Xposé
- Children: 3

Aisling O'Loughlin (born 1978) is best known for co-presenting TV3's Xposé from 2007 until 2016. She is now based in Provence.

== Early life ==
Born in Shannon, County Clare, O'Loughlin was educated locally before later attending Villiers School in Limerick. She subsequently studied journalism at Dublin City University (DCU).

== Career ==
O'Loughlin began her broadcasting career while studying journalism at DCU. As part of her internship she worked on the Today with Pat Kenny show on RTÉ Radio 1 where she reported on a range of current affairs subjects. She later completed her studies in Toulouse.

After returning to Ireland, O'Loughlin joined Clare FM where she read the news and also reported on local issues. She spent some time as a radio journalist before embarking on a career with the print media as a reporter with the Evening Echo and the Limerick Leader.

In 2001 O'Loughlin switched to television when she joined TV3 News where she began working in the newsroom behind the scenes. She subsequently spent six years as a general news reporter and as a relief newsreader before moving from TV3's news and current affairs programming.

Aisling was one of the founding members of TV3's flagship entertainment show Xposé that launched in April 2007, and she stayed with the show until November 2016, when she was replaced while on maternity leave with her third son Joseph.

== Views ==
In April 2021, O'Loughlin posted on her Instagram from her home in Provence opposing the COVID-19 vaccine. She stated that she was not going to take the vaccine and encouraged her followers to consider their options against the vaccine, describing it as "the biggest scandal the world has ever seen". O'Loughlin also reposted a quote about the "Big lie" from former Nazi leader Joseph Goebbels, stating though she doesn't align herself with Nazi beliefs, she will not disassociate herself from the quote either. O'Loughlin was criticised by fellow broadcaster Maïa Dunphy for her comments.

== Personal life ==
O'Loughlin has three sons with photographer Nicholas Mac Innes: Patrick, born in December 2011; Louis, in December 2013; and Joseph, in May 2016.
