= Late Lunch Live =

- Genre: Afternoon news and talk show
- Presented by: Lucy Kennedy; Martin King; Claire Solan
- Country of origin: Ireland
- Original language: English

Production
- Production locations: Ballymount, Dublin
- Camera setup: Multi Camera

Original release
- Network: TV3; 3e
- Release: 30 September 2013 – 16 February 2015

Related
- Ireland AM; Midday; Xposé; TV3 News

Late Lunch Live is an Irish afternoon television show on the channel TV3, which later became Virgin Media One. It premiered live on 30 September 2013 airing every Monday to Friday from 14:00. By 2014 the show was moved to a new timeslot of 15:30 to 16:30.

The program features news and weather updates, showbiz, fashion, beauty, food, health and lifestyle. Its in-studio presenters are Lucy Kennedy, Martin King and previously reporter Claire Solan took part in the show.

As part of the revamp of TV3's Daytime schedule due to falling audience figures an extended version of Ireland AM and Late Lunch Live replace The Morning Show.

On 30 January 2015 TV3 Group confirmed the show's cancellation to make way for a new show called The 7 O'Clock show, which premiered on 16 February 2015. Both presenters of The Late Lunch Live moved to the new show.
