= Karen Koster =

Irish journalist

- Born: The Hague, Netherlands
- Education: Trinity College Dublin
- Occupations: Television presenter; Journalist
- Employer: Virgin Media Television (Ireland)
- Agent: Noel Kelly
- Notable credit(s): Xposé, Ireland AM
- Spouse: John McGuire (m. 2013)
- Children: 3

Karen Koster is an Irish-Dutch television presenter, known for her work on Xposé and Ireland AM.

== Education ==
She graduated from Trinity College Dublin, in 2003 with a degree in English Literature and French.

== Career ==
In 2001, she was runner-up in RTÉ's The Selection Box. She joined TV3 as a weather presenter on Ireland AM in 2004. She presented Xposé from 2007 until its cancellation in 2019. She rejoined Ireland AM in 2019 as maternity cover for Ciara Doherty before becoming a permanent co-host following the cancellation of Xposé and departure of original presenter Mark Cagney.

== Personal life ==
In 2013 she married her businessman boyfriend of six years John McGuire Jnr in Sicily, Italy. In June 2014 she announced that she was pregnant and a baby boy Finn was born in December 2014.

In October 2015 she revealed that she was five months pregnant and her second son, John James, was born in February 2016. In June 2018, Koster gave birth to a daughter, Eve.
