= Ireland AM =

Irish television show

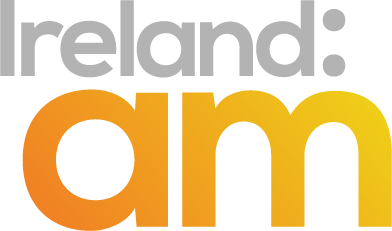
- Genre: Breakfast television programme
- Presented by: Tommy Bowe (Monday–Thursday); Muireann O'Connell (Monday–Thursday); Alan Hughes (Monday–Thursday); Elaine Crowley (Friday–Sunday); Martin King (Friday-Sunday); Eric Roberts (Friday-Sunday)
- Opening theme: Capital Life
- Composers: Paul Wickens; Stephen Spiro
- Country of origin: Ireland
- Original language: English

Production
- Executive producer: Celine Mc Gillycuddy
- Producer: Sinead Ryan
- Production locations: Virgin Media Television HD Studio, Ballymount, Dublin
- Running time: 180 minutes (1999 - 2019, 2020 - present) 240 minutes (2019-2020) (including advertising)
- Production company: Virgin Media Television

Original release
- Network: Virgin Media One
- Release: 20 September 1999 – present

Related
- Weekend AM (2015–Present)

Ireland AM (stylized as Ireland: am) is an Irish morning television show on Virgin Media One. It airs live every weekday from 07:00 to 10:00, and weekends from 9:00 to 12:00. The program features news, current affairs, weather updates, showbiz, fashion, beauty, food, health, home and garden. Its current weekday presenters are Alan Hughes, Muireann O'Connell and Tommy Bowe.

The show is currently sponsored by Fairy, Febreze, Lenor, Pantene, Ariel, Head & Shoulders, Always and Flash while the programme was previously sponsored by P&G, Unilever, Dolmio and Kellogg's.

From late 2019 to March 2020, Ireland AM was the longest live breakfast programme in Europe in terms of broadcast length, airing for four hours from 07:00 until 11:00.

As of 2021, Ireland AM is the only Irish breakfast programme currently airing.

As part of a new daytime schedule line up, from Monday 7 October 2019 the programme was extended to 11:00 am on weekdays, with the weekend editions continuing too. In March 2020 it reverted to airing till 10:00 am on weekdays. During the COVID-19 pandemic, Ireland AM began airing at the later time of 8 am but reverted to its original time of 7 am in September 2020.

== History ==
=== 1999–2003 ===
Ireland AM was launched on 20 September 1999 on the 1st anniversary of TV3's launch, the first show of its kind in Ireland. It was originally on air from 7:00 am to 9:00 am, hosted by Mark Cagney and Amanda Byram. The show went on air almost a year after TV3 launched, and was seen as an attempt by the station to improve ratings. In 2001 Amanda Byram left the show and moved to Channel 4 breakfast show The Big Breakfast. Amanda was replaced by Claire Byrne. A number of years after the start of the show TV3 executives decided on an extra hour for the show, and the show finished at 10:30 am.

=== 2004–2008 ===
In March 2004, Claire Byrne left the show in order to replace Gráinne Seoige as the main news anchor on TV3. Byrne was replaced by Maura Derrane, a news presenter on the channel. In October 2005, Mark Cagney was nominated and later won the TV Personality of the Year Award at the Irish Film and Television Awards (IFTAs). After two years as co-host, Maura Derrane left the show in September 2006. She was replaced by television newcomer Sinead Desmond.

By 2009 Desmond, and original presenter Cagney, were joined by Alan Hughes, Aidan Cooney and Anna Daly, who also frequently present segments and interview guests. Elaine Crowley presents news bulletins every half-hour, while Laura Woods is also a frequent contributor. Today FM's Adelle McDonnell has contributed to a section of the show featuring soaps.

In 2008, Midday joined TV3's line up of Daytime programmes.

=== 2009–2013 ===
In 2009 it was joined by The Morning Show with Sybil & Martin which followed the show at 10:30, it remained as a sister show until 2013, when Late Lunch Live joined TV3's daytime line up.

Ireland AM won the "Favourite TV Show in Ireland" at the TV Now Awards in 2009.

The show won the award for Broadcaster/Journalist of the Year at the 2011 GALAs.

In 2013 a revamp of TV3 daytime schedule saw Ireland AM add 40 minutes. It aired from 7 am to 10:45 am. From 07:00 to 08:00 Anton Savage presented a news and current affairs edition of the show, which is then followed by Ireland AM proper from 08:00 to 10:45. The revamp was due to falling daytime viewing figures from the channel.

Ireland AM currently makes up 12.5% of TV3 output, or 41% of their legally required Irish programming content. The Best of Ireland AM airs at different times on Saturday and Sunday mornings on sister channel 3e, featuring highlights from the weekday shows. Ireland AM received an overhaul in September 2014. The show moved into the Sony HD Studios in Dublin's Ballymount.

=== 2014–2018 ===
In July 2015, Ciara Doherty joined the show replacing Anna Daly who left the show to take up her new role on Saturday AM and Sunday AM which began from 29 August 2015.

On 31 July 2015 Ireland AM revamped its titles and on-air graphics.

On 19 November 2017, Sinead Desmond quit her role on Ireland AM over an alleged gender pay gap row with the station. Nearly six months after Desmond's departure, it was announced that Ciara Doherty would take over Desmond's role as co-host. In 2017 ITV's This Morning was moved from Virgin Media Three (then known as UTV Ireland) as a follow-up to Ireland AM.

On Saturday 29 August 2015, Ireland AM launched spin-off shows Saturday AM and Sunday AM. Both shows are hosted by Anna Daly providing a mix of current affairs, showbiz, entertainment, in-studio guests, cookery, debate and fashion. Anna hosts the show each Saturday with Simon Delaney and on Sunday, formerly with Ivan Yates and latterly with Ian Noctor. Saturday AM focuses more on light entertainment whereas Sunday AM concentrates more on current affairs, debate and an analysis of Sunday newspapers. TV3 News provides news updates.

On 30 August 2018, to coincide with the rebranding of TV3 to "Virgin Media One", a relaunch of the show took place. A new studio and a new on screen look was revealed. On 1 September 2018, to coincide with the rebranding of TV3 to "Virgin Media One", the Saturday and Sunday editions of the programme were renamed as "Weekend AM".

In December 2018, it was announced that Aidan Cooney had left the show after being absent for several weeks.

=== 2019–present ===
In July 2019, Virgin Media Television announced that Mark Cagney, who had been presenting the show since it began on TV3 in 1999 would be leaving the show. Virgin Media Television are yet to reveal his permanent replacement.

On 31 July 2019 Cagney presented his last Ireland AM alongside Karen Koster and Alan Hughes. The show dedicated the last half hour of the show to him and aired a highlights reel. All the production crew, including Ciara Doherty who was on Maternity Leave at the time came in to wish Cagney good luck on his future endeavours.

In October 2019, Weekend AM stayed Weekend AM instead of ending.

On Friday 4 October 2019, Ireland AM was given an extra hour running from 7.00am – 11.00am, replacing ITV's This Morning, as part of a brand new weekday schedule launched by Virgin Media One, it was followed by Elaine.

On Monday 9 March 2020 ITV's This Morning returned to Virgin Media one with Ireland AM finishing at 10:00am and Elaine moving to 15:00.

In 2021 series regulars Aidan Power, Laura Woods and Anna Daly all left the show, while Karen Koster moved to The 6 O'Clock Show with Muireann O'Connell moving to Ireland AM. Elaine Crowley joined Simon Delaney after her show was axed.

In 2022, Brian Dowling joined Simon Delaney and Elaine Crowley on Saturdays and Sundays. Ireland AM also revamped its titles and on air graphics.

== Presenters ==
Ireland AM's current main presenters are Alan Hughes, Muireann O'Connell and Tommy Bowe – (Monday – Thursday) with Elaine Crowley, Martin King and Eric Roberts (Friday-Sunday)

Presenter	Role	Duration
Tommy Bowe	Co-host (Monday–Thursday)	2020–present
Muireann O'Connell	Co-host (Monday–Thursday)	2021–present
Alan Hughes	Co-host (Monday–Thursday)	1999–present
Elaine Crowley	Co-host (Friday–Sunday)	2021–present
Martin King	Co-host (Friday–Sunday)	2022–present
Eric Roberts	Co-host (Friday–Sunday)	2025–present

== Regulars ==
Regular contributors include journalists from the Irish Examiner, The Irish Times and TheJournal.ie.

Presenter	Role
Deric Ó h'Artagáin	Weather
Ger Treacy	Sport
Lisa Fitzpatrick	Fashion
Sonja Mohlich	Fashion
Laura Bermingham	Beauty
Celia Holman Lee	Fashion
Andrea Roche	Fashion
Anne-Marie Gannon	Fashion
Barbara Stack	Fashion
Rob Kenny	Fashion
Ciara O'Doherty	Fashion
Catherine Leyden	Cookery
Edward Hayden	Cookery
Dr. Sinead Beirne	Health
Pete Wedderburn	Pet advice
Colin Baker	Gadgets
Sarina Bellissimo	Movie reviews
Gordon Hayden	Movie reviews
Brian Lloyd	Movie reviews
Lisa Cannon	Co-host
Julianne Mooney	Travel
Will Dalton	Sport
Ruth Scott	Co-host

== Former presenters ==
Presenter	Role	Duration
Amanda Byram	Co-host	1999–2000
Emma Buckley	Co-host	2000
Claire Byrne	Co-host	2000–2004
Maura Derrane	Co-host	2004–2006
Anton Savage	Co-host	2013–2014
Sinead Desmond	Co-host	2006–2017
Aidan Cooney	Co-host and Sport	2006–2018
Mark Cagney	Co-host	1999–2019
Ciara Doherty	Co-host	2015–2020
Karen Koster	Co-host	2019–2021
Anna Daly	Co-host	2009–2015, 2019–2021
Laura Woods	Co-host	2019–2021
Aidan Power	Co-host and sport	2019–2021
Simon Delaney	Co–host	2019-2022
Katja Mia	Co-host	2022-2023

== Newsreaders ==
- Hannah Murphy
- Mairead Cleary
- Geraldine Lynagh
- Anne O'Donnell
- Aisling Roche
- Cliodnha Russell
- Colette Fitzpatrick

== Logos ==
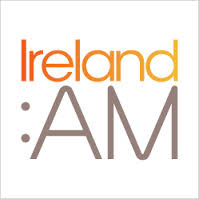
Logo used from 2009 to 2015

Logo used from 2015 to 2018

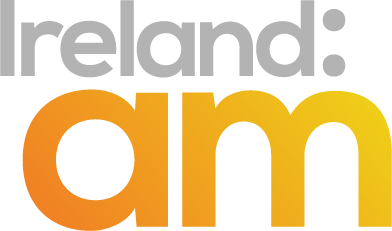
Ireland AM Logo in use since August 2018
