= Virgin Media One =

Irish television station

Coordinates: 53.309565°N 6.35564°W

- Country: Ireland
- Network: Virgin Media Television

Programming
- Language: English
- Picture format: 1080i HDTV (downscaled to 16:9 576i for the SDTV feed)
- Timeshift service: Virgin Media One +1

Ownership
- Owner: Virgin Media Ireland
- Sister channels: Virgin Media Two; Virgin Media Three; Virgin Media Four

History
- Launched: 20 September 1998
- Former names: TV Three (1998–2006); TV3 (2006–2018)

Links
- Website: www.virginmediatelevision.ie

Availability

Terrestrial
- Saorview: Channel 3

Streaming media
- Virgin TV Anywhere: Watch live (Ireland only); Watch live (+1) (Ireland only)
- Virgin Media Play: Watch live (Ireland only)

Virgin Media One, is an Irish free-to-air television channel owned by Virgin Media Ireland (part of Liberty Global), operated through its subsidiary Virgin Media Television. The channel launched on 20 September 1998, as TV Three, becoming Ireland's fourth television channel and the first commercial channel. It was known as TV3 from 2006, and then as Virgin Media One from 30 August 2018. The channel broadcasts a mix of Irish programming and acquired programming from ITV and other networks.

== History ==
=== Background ===
In October 1988, the Independent Radio and Television Commission (IRTC) was set up to regulate new independent stations. Following this, TV3 was intended to be the Republic of Ireland's third terrestrial channel. The original broadcasting licence was granted to a consortium Tullamore Beta Ltd in 1990 (some of this consortium made up of Windmill Lane Productions and Paul McGuinness). It was originally envisaged that the channel would broadcast solely on cable and analogue MMDS, with a tentative launch for late 1991, but it was later (1990) decided that the channel should broadcast on some terrestrial UHF transmitters similar to other Irish channels. Initially their signal coverage was much poorer than that of RTÉ but this has been largely addressed since the switchover to digital television. There were concerns as of 1991 that TV3's signals would interfere with UHF frequencies from Wales and parts of England. No plans were to be announced until the frequency issue was solved.

TV3's broadcast was further delayed when IRTC revoked the broadcasting licence due to delays in broadcasting the channel. After a court battle the licence was eventually restored in 1993. By 1993 an agreement was made to sell 49 per cent of the company to UTV, to raise much-needed cash for investment in facilities. However, UTV pulled out of negotiations in September 1996, after TV3 tried to convince existing MMDS and cable television providers to drop UTV and replace it with TV3. Cable operators declined to drop UTV Northern Ireland from its line-up.

In 1997, Canadian communications company Canwest bought a major stake in the new company; the launch goal was expected for year-end 1998. Bidding wars for acquisitions favoured RTÉ more than TV3 in 1998, with RTÉ having outbid the new broadcaster in acquiring the rights to Fox's action film Independence Day. As of July that year, TV3's operational budget was comparable to RTÉ's budget for foreign acquisitions. Days ahead of launch, the station spent £330,000 of its budget to advertise on the RTÉ channels.

Throughout most of the 1990s, the only terrestrial television channels in Ireland were RTÉ One and Network 2. A third channel, TnaG, was launched on 31 October 1996. Despite being the fourth channel in Ireland, TV3's naming secured it the "third place" listing in many television listings, which had previously been occupied by TnaG.

=== Launch and early years ===
The station finally opened on 20 September 1998, activating a countdown to the inaugural programme, while at 5:28pm, Taoiseach Bertie Ahern switched on its signal from the control room. The channel was available to a nationwide transmitter network, which also included areas where British TV signals were weak; some of the programmes seen on the new channel were new to thousands of Irish people. The inaugural programme was This is TV3, which was dubbed by RTÉ employees as "Tallaght TV". After the programme, the first edition of News@Six with Gráinne Seoige followed, the lead story being related to the Clinton–Lewinsky scandal.

During its first two weeks on air, 927,000 people have viewed the channel, especially for its core programming: EastEnders, the miniseries Merlin and the film The Quick and the Dead. With these programmes alone, the channel believed that it passed its 6% target. The channel was initially aimed at the 15–44 age group, at the time, the most favoured by advertisers, and also had a remit for 15% of its programming to be homegrown – rising to 25% within five years.

The launch was seen as "low key" compared to TnaG's two years earlier. The channel at the time was comparable to a general entertainment service of the time, making it indistingushable from satellite channels or RTÉ's Network 2. Compared to TnaG, which had a liberal slant, TV3's had a distinctly "conservative American" viewpoint. Moreover, its launch had problems from cable and MMDS companies; late on 18 September, RTÉ took to the courts against CMI's decision of displacing Network 2 in favor of the new channel. Irish Multichannel shared it with Bravo, a channel known for its risky programmes, between midnight and 12pm; the channel was concerned that its subscribers would have its signal cut off at midnight, before its nightly closedown, handing over to Bravo, which at the time had lightweight adult programming in late night slots.

Rumours emerged in late October that its output agreement with Columbia Pictures was cut. It also wanted to negotiate with the FAI as the channel was barred from showing match highlights on its programmes or giving interviews, especially after its 5-0 defeat to Malta in the European Qualifiers on 14 October. The channel wanted to air the match between Ireland and Yugoslavia as a promotional push for viewers, but the political situation in Yugoslavia at the time caused the match to be delayed to 18 November.

=== Granada administration ===
On 12 September 2000, Granada purchased a 45% equity share (equal to Canwest's share) in the company, for £18.7 million in cash. As part of the deal, an agreement was signed to carry the company's programming catalogue, which implied that, from 1 January 2001, Coronation Street would move from RTÉ One to TV3, while Emmerdale would be introduced to Ireland on the channel. Granada's involvement with the channel caused it to witness losses of €2.1 million in the first eight months of 2001 alone in CRO accounts. The channel was on track to cut its accumulated losses to €5 million in 2001.

=== Doughty Hanson & Co. administration ===
In May 2006, the group was sold to Doughty Hanson & Co., agreeing to buy 100% of the company for €265 million. In May 2006, during the transitional phase, TV3 started handling advertising slots on LIVINGtv's Irish advertising feed, with the sales being managed from the Ballymount complex.

ITV plc created in 2004 following the merger of Carlton and Granada) The Doughty Hanson & Co. administration changed the channel's public image from a "reseller of cheap American imports" to a channel with a significant amount of local content, something deemed impossible in previous administrations.

The acquisition of Channel 6 in late 2008 led to the channel rebranding and ditching its founding logo. TV3 adopted a uniform brand for both linear channels and its website.

The plan for what would become UTV Ireland in January 2014 caused TV3 to request information on its BAI terms following the announcement held in November 2013 that it would take over ITV's output agreements.

=== Sale to Liberty Global ===
In 2015, Liberty Global confirmed it planned to purchase the TV3 Group, approval to purchase the broadcaster was given on 2 October 2015 by the CCPC.

=== As Virgin Media One ===
In June 2018, it was announced that the TV3 Group channels would be rebranded as Virgin Media Television on 30 August 2018, with TV3 renamed Virgin Media One.

== Subsidiary channels ==
=== Virgin Media One +1 ===
Timeshift logo since 30 August 2018

A timeshift channel TV3 +1 launched on 2 December 2014 on UPC Ireland. The channel was added to Sky Ireland on 8 April 2015.

However, the channel is unavailable to viewers on Saorview, as TV3 were in dispute with its operator 2RN (formerly a subsidiary of RTÉ) over the non-payment of tariffs over several years by TV3. On 30 August 2018, with the rebrand of TV3, TV3 +1 was rebranded as Virgin Media One +1.

=== Virgin Media One HD ===
HD logo since 30 August 2018

TV3 HD is a high definition version of TV3, both domestic and imported programming is available in HD, mainly sporting content. TV3 HD launched on Virgin Media Ireland and Sky Ireland on 11 August 2015. It is anticipated TV3 will utilise its existing Virgin Media TV3 HD Studio in Ballymount where a number of its shows already broadcast from such as Ireland:AM, Xposé, The Tonight Show and 3 News. The service is currently unavailable on Saorview. On 30 August 2018, with the rebrand of TV3, TV3 HD was rebranded as Virgin Media One HD.

== Broadcasting policy ==
TV3 broadcasts a wide range of programming which in its early years depended heavily on international acquisitions. In 2008, the TV3 Group produced a three-year strategy to increase the amount of homegrown productions on the channel. Under its contract with the Broadcasting Commission of Ireland (BCI), TV3 is required since 2008 to have 30% of its programming coming from Ireland though TV3 now produces 40% Irish produced content (most of this content comes from in studio productions such as Ireland AM and Xposé). In 2010 TV3 announced a target of 50% Irish programming by 2012. TV3 has also confirmed its plan to build a major new studio in 2011 which will be fully HD capable with audience capacity.

The company has a small staff of 200 employees to run three television channels and one on-demand online service. On average, TV3 spend about €10 million on internal productions which are generally for daytime viewers. It does not have a history of strong prime-time content; generally its home produced programmes consist of at least one independently produced programme, e.g. The Apprentice, a number of internal documentaries such as Ireland Undercover and a number of BCI licence fee-funded independent products such as School Run, Diary of... and Modern Ireland.

As of October 2009, TV3 claims to be the most watched television channel by people aged 15–24 years old. This group was previously captured by RTÉ One. This is an important group to capture as it is often these viewers whom advertisers wish to target. In reaction to this press release from TV3, RTÉ rebutted its claims stating that RTÉ One outdoes TV3 in far more demographic categories and that TV3's press release, "In terms of the selective audiences focussed upon by TV3 in their release, it's clear this is a recent phenomenon and only pertains to a narrow sub-demographic of young viewers in this country. By contrast, the year-to-date equivalent (1 January – 20 October), all day national share, sees RTÉ One with a 16.2% share of the 15-24s; TV3 with a 13.3% share."

=== Budget ===
In 2009 TV3 had revenues of €54,300,000. In the previous year (2008), TV3 received €62 million in advertising revenue. Increases in programme cost during 2008 included new sporting contracts with the GAA and UEFA, the first renewal of its contract with the British broadcaster ITV for shows such as The X Factor and Coronation Street, a small but significant increase in programmes commissioned from independent producers. It also increased investment in online technology, with its online service earning a profit for the first time.

In 2008, TV3 received €3 million in funding from the licence fee for independent productions on the channel.

In 2009, two rounds of redundancies reduced TV3 staff to 213 people. Staff savings have been augmented by agreed reductions in wages. The 200 staff working in TV3 now provide seven hours of live television five days a week, an increase of two hours and a staff reduction of 50 since 2007.

In February 2012 the Irish Bank Resolution Corporation (IBRC) restructured TV3's outstanding loans to the bank. The owners of TV3, Doherty Hanson & Co., have loans of €140million with the bank. €51million continued to be repaid over the next 5 years, while €81.1 was frozen until a "liquidity event", according to the IBRC this is in the event of a sale of TV3.

In 2014 TV3 saw losses of €7 million, and €17 million in 2015, with operating expenses of €55.6 million.

=== Product placement ===
Product placement within Irish produced programming had previously been banned by broadcasting authorities in Ireland, though in the past Irish viewers have been used to product placement as seen on US television and film productions. Due to an EU ruling made in 2007, Irish broadcasters can now place products within programming mainly entertainment shows, though excludes programming which is deemed mainly 'news and current affairs' and programming aimed at children. On 15 August 2011 it was confirmed that TV3 would become the first official broadcaster to implement the new broadcasting terms. Kenco reportedly paid TV3 Group a six-figure sum to place its branding on two key early morning television shows mainly, The Morning Show and Midday from September 2011. Similar to RTÉ and TG4 broadcasters will have to air the logo 'PP' at the beginning and end of the show to inform viewers that products will appear on the show. RTÉ Television has previously used product placement on its series The Late Late Show.

When Virgin Media One broadcast shows from the UK that have Product Placement (such as This Morning, Loose Women and Britain's Got Talent), They show just a simple “P” just like the UK does.

== Irish-produced programming ==
Virgin Media Ireland programming has often been criticised for having no "distinctive, clearly Irish identity". In spring 2008, a major effort was made by the station to change this situation. In general Virgin Media Ireland spends around €10 million on its Irish productions each year. In 2008 it significantly increased the number of prime time shows produced in Ireland. Under current broadcasting legislation, Virgin Media One is required to use 15% of its total Irish production budget for independent productions. Since 2004 independent productions for the network have been able to avail of the BAI's Sound and Vision Fund, a fund provided to the Broadcasting Authority of Ireland (BAI) from the licence fee. In 2008 independent producers received €3million from the Sound and Vision fund for programming that they produced for the network.

=== News and current affairs ===
Virgin Media News provides national Irish and international news through television, online, on-demand and on mobile. The news service begins at 07:00 with regularly bulletins featured on Ireland AM until 10:00. The main news bulletins on Virgin Media One are Virgin Media News at 12.30, Virgin Media News at 5.30, Virgin Media News at 7.00, plus “Virgin Media News: Week In Review” and “The Big Interview”.

=== Sports programming ===
From its infancy, TV3 aired a live sporting programme called Sports Tonight (1998–2009) hosted by Trevor Welsh, which was the first daily sports show of its kind in Ireland. The show would air weeknights from 23:30, until its cancellation on 23 March 2009.

At its launch, TV3 secured rights to number of Republic of Ireland exhibition matches. It joined forces with Sky to provide deferred coverage of World Cup Qualifying games along with a programme dedicated to League of Ireland games, The Soccer Show and live coverage of League of Ireland games. Later those games moved to RTÉ after the government chose to put those games on a live free-to-air footing.

Virgin Media Ireland currently holds the Irish broadcasting rights to 2018 for UEFA Champions League on Tuesday nights, while RTÉ 2 covers Wednesday nights and the final exclusively live. which includes in-vision sporting commentary and analysis by Virgin Media Sport presenters and crew. Coverage is presented by Tommy Martin alongside 2 pundits examples being Graeme Souness, Harry Redknapp, Brian Kerr, Neil Lennon, Martin Keown or Tony Cascarino. Commentary is provided by Dave McIntyre and Kevin Kilbane or Mark Lawrenson with Trevor Welsh also providing highlights commentary. The network previously held exclusive Irish rights from 2001 to 2004. It then lost these to RTÉ but since 2009 have shared rights with RTÉ and will continue to have these rights until 2018. TV3 also held rights to the UEFA Europa League matches on Thursday nights until 2015. In 2015 TV3 began airing the FA Cup Final live and will do so through to 2018. The coverage was presented by Tommy Martin alongside Paul McShane and Brian Kerr with commentary by Dave McIntyre and Kevin Kilbane.

A milestone in TV3 broadcasting history came with coverage of the 2011 UEFA Europa League Final, held at the Aviva Stadium in Dublin. Forty cameras were used to broadcast to an audience in the tens of millions across the world.

From 2008 to 2013 TV3 secured broadcasting rights for a selection of GAA All-Ireland Senior Football Championship and All-Ireland Senior Hurling Championship matches as part of Championship Live. In 2008, the station began broadcasting a selection of live matches, as well as a weekly preview show called Championship Throw In. TV3 lost these rights in 2014 to Sky Sports.

TV3 first aired Rugby with coverage of the 2007 Rugby World Cup. The channel had coverage of 13 games with all Ireland matches, quarter-finals, semi-finals, the final and the opening match shown live alongside Setanta Ireland who broadcast all matches. TV3 coverage in 2007 was hosted by Matt Cooper with analysis by Paul Wallace, Trevor Brennan, Jim Glennon, Michael Cheika, Jim Williams and Victor Costello. The commentators were Conor McNamara and Phillip Matthews.

Days after the loss of Gaelic games Championship rights in 2014, the station secured live free to air coverage of the 2015 Rugby World Cup. TV3 broadcast all 48 matches in the 2015 Rugby World Cup. Coverage was presented by Matt Cooper or Tommy Martin alongside Keith Wood, Matt Williams, Peter Stringer, Shane Jennings, Neil Back, Murray Kinsella with commentary by 2 commentary teams – the first being Conor McNamara, Stuart Barnes and Liam Toland and the second being Dave McIntyre and Hugo McNeill. Other commentary was provided by the world field such as Andrew Cotter, Joel Stransky, Alan Quinlan, Chris Patterson. The coverage has been met with significant criticism due to the high number of ad breaks and their positioning throughout the coverage. After a successful Rugby World Cup for TV3 they shocked RTÉ Sport in November 2015 by winning the rights to broadcast all matches in the 6 Nations from 2018 to 2021 with RTÉ continuing to cover the tournament in 2016–2017.

=== Daytime programming ===
Virgin Media One's daytime TV takes up the majority of its home produced programming. Virgin Media Ireland has stated that 40% of its total output is of Irish origin 10% more than its requirement under its broadcast licence with the Broadcasting Authority of Ireland. Together Ireland AM, News at 12.30, The Six O’Clock Show and News at 5.30 make up 32 hours of television each week.

TV3's first daytime produced programme was Speakeasy, produced by Fastnet for TV3. The series focused on topical issues affecting people in Ireland ranging from divorce, sex, crime, multiculturalism, poverty, sexuality and other topics were discussed amongst the presenter and a panel of guests. The show ran for one year from 1998 to 1999.

The station created a new morning news talk show, Ireland AM, launched in September 1999. It became Ireland's first televised breakfast show. The show airs every weekday morning from 07:00 until 10:00 featuring a broad range of topics such as news, show business, daily newspapers, current affairs, technology, cooking, animal welfare, social issues, fashion, beauty, health, interviews, traffic reports, weather, sport, movies and music. Ireland AM's presenting team include Karen Koster, Anna Daly, Ciara Doherty and Alan Hughes.

Originally Ireland AM broadcast for two hours each morning, it now broadcasts for 3 hours. In 2013 45 minutes extra were added to the show with the first hour hosted by Anton Savage as a current affairs programme, in 2014 TV3 drop the extra 45 minutes and the first hour of Current Affairs.

In 2008, TV3 launched a female skewed programme similar to The View called Midday. Midday broadcasts from 11:30 until 12:30; the show is presented by Elaine Crowley and is joined on occasion by Sybil Mulcahy in front of a live studio audience. It ended in 2015

In 2009, TV3 launched a new topical show called The Morning Show with Sybil & Martin. In August 2013, TV3 confirmed that The Morning Show had been axed from the new autumn schedule after weeks of speculation.

In 2013 Late Lunch Live started broadcasting Monday to Friday at 14:30. The show is hosted by Lucy Kennedy and Martin King. In February 2015 this was replaced by The Seven O'Clock Show.

In 2014 the afternoon news at 12:45 was rebranded as The 12:30 and now runs for 30 minutes Monday to Friday. In June 2015, TV3 Group confirmed it would extend its Ireland AM format into the weekends. From August 2015, the station began broadcasting Weekend AM live providing up to six hours live content on the weekends.

=== Reality and entertainment programming ===
==== 1998–2001 ====
The channel's first attempt at a travel show was Messrs Tylak and Rooney in which Joe Rooney and Paul Tykla traveled around Ireland's tourist spots.

In 2000, TV3 commissioned the dating game Perfect Match hosted by Twink (Adele King), which only aired for one season.

From 2001 TV3 began to produce Irish versions of hit international television shows including The Weakest Link hosted by Eamon Dunphy.

Other entertainment shows included a film show, Take 3.

==== 2002–2006 ====
In May 2002, Haunted House started out with about 26 contestants who would be ultimately voted out of the house by the public. The tasks were similar to those of I'm a Celebrity...Get Me Out of Here!.

In 2003, TV3 launched the ill-fated The Dunphy Show presented by Eamon Dunphy, which was built up to be a contender with RTÉ One's The Late Late Show.

TV3 also launched a weekly movie review show called Popcorn.

In 2005, TV3 made a second attempt at launching another late night talk show every Wednesday at 22:00 hosted by Brendan Courtney called The Brendan Courtney Show. It was somewhat successful and ran for two seasons.

In the same year the channel launched a property based show hosted by Richard Eberle and Maura Derrane called The Property Game. Similar to other European broadcasters TV3 began to produce its own reality based TV series.

In 2006 TV3 produced its second reality TV series. The Box, fronted by Keith Duffy, debuted on Monday 9 October 2006.

==== 2007–2014 ====
From 2007 TV3 continued its commitment to increase its Irish entertainment output. In April 2007, the channel launched the female-skewed news entertainment show Xposé airing weeknights at 18:00.

An Irish version of Deal or No Deal which ran for one season in association with the Irish National Lottery was launched in 2009. It was produced by Endemol for TV3.

As part of the autumn-winter schedule in 2008, TV3 aired the Irish version of the internationally successful The Apprentice. This proved to be very successful for TV3. The series aired on the channel between 2008 and 2012. It also led to spin-off shows called The Apprentice: You're Fired! and The Apprentice: At Home.

In 2009 entertainment news anchor Lorraine Keane left Xposé, which resulted in a reality TV show called Total Xposure which focused on a nationwide search for a new presenter.

TV3 began to air an Irish version of the international dating show Take Me Out from 2010. The series was presented by radio DJ Ray Foley.

In 2011, Adele King was expected to host an agony aunt talkshow, Give Adele a Bell; this has not aired on TV3. Alan Hughes Family Fortunes aired on the channel in 2011 along with an Irish version of Mastermind.

On 7 June 2010 TV3 introduced Celebrity Salon, in which each season focuses on six celebrities who have to complete daily tasks in relation to the beauty industry. The celebrities who appeared in the show's first season included Brian Dowling, Pippa O'Connor, Leigh Arnold, Virginia Macari, Celia Holman Lee and Breffny Morgan.

In the same month TV3 introduced Style Wars, a search for Ireland's top fashion designer in a similar format to Project Runway.

The same year TV3 produced a localized version of the BBC Three series Young, Dumb and Living Off Mum.

On 8 April 2011 TV3 produced a reality show based on cooking, Head Chef. Due to its success a celebrity version, Celebrity Head Chef, and youth-oriented show, Junior Head Chef, were also introduced.

TV3 began to produce an Irish version of Come Dine With Me, produced by ITV for TV3 Group. The series aired on the channel as well as international channels such as Channel 4.

Following the success of MTV's scripted reality shows such as Jersey Shore, TV3 introduced its equivalent with the launch of Tallafornia in 2011. The show proved to be successful for the channel. A number of spin-off shows followed and aired on sister channel 3e. A new reality TV series was introduced, Dublin Wives (previously Dublin Housewives).

In 2013 new shows were introduced to the schedule including The Great Irish Bake Off and an Irish version of Celebrity Apprentice. Keith Barry hosted a second show for TV3, Brain Hacker. It also confirmed new game shows such as Pressure Point, Can't Move? Improve! and Save Your Money.

==== 2014–2016 ====
TV3 announced a number of new entertainment series for the next two years, including an Irish version of the successful Channel 4 series Gogglebox. This proved successful for TV3 and a second series was commissioned.

As part of an overhaul of TV3, it stated it would launch a new lifestyle show airing each weekday night from early 2015, Life. However, in a change of plans, TV3 opted for a weekly Friday night series for a six-week run, with The Seven O'Clock Show replacing Late Lunch Live.

Xposé runs for 60 minutes each weekday night from 18:00 as of 8 September 2014 (an increase of 30 minutes).

Home produced game shows including Sitting on a Fortune, Keith Barry: Brain Hacker, The Lie, The Algorithm with Ray Foley, Crossfire and Jason Byrne's Snaptastic Show all aired on the channel in 2014. The Lie got a second season in 2015. In 2015 The Restaurant was picked up by TV3, after a five-year hiatus from RTÉ. Brian Ormond will present a new game show called Wishlist on the channel in 2016.

==== 2017–present ====
As part of the three channel partnership, the station began to simulcast This Morning, as a result Ireland AM was shown from 7:00 to 10:30, The Chase will be shown at 13:00. They also air British soap operas Emmerdale and Coronation Street

Stellify Media produced an Irish version of Blind Date, hosted by IFTA Award winning comedian Al Porter that aired on TV3 on 8 October 2017. As of 8 February 2019 they have aired the Irish version of Got Talent, locally called Ireland's Got Talent. Since 2017 they have also aired The Voice UK, this is the first version of the voice to air in Ireland since RTÉ One cancelled The Voice Of Ireland, they also air The X Factor UK

=== Drama ===
Upon launch, the network was slow to embrace producing localised dramas. However, it contributed to producing a number of short and feature films with both the Broadcasting Authority of Ireland and Screen Ireland (then the Irish Film Board) such as Watermelon.

In 2004, it co-produced RTÉ Two's ill-fated 20 some-things drama The Big Bow Wow.

From 2006, the channel looked towards home produced drama with the likes of Laura Windermere's Bag and Deception. It also took a look at two other drama serials The Guards and a revival of RTÉ's The Clinic; however, neither came to fruition.

In 2008, further homegrown produced drama series were added, the first being the one-off bilingual drama School Run. This was based on a school and was co-financed by TV3 and Broadcasting Authority of Ireland's Sound and Vision Fund. It debuted in December 2008. In 2009, TV3 produced Laura Windermere's Bag, a contemporary adaptation of the Oscar Wilde play Lady Windermere's Fan, set in the south of Dublin.

TV3 would later produce The Guards starring Emmett J. Scanlan, promoting it as an Irish version of The Wire it was scheduled to broadcast in summer 2010. When production began two episodes were produced and later an additional four episodes were added to the series. Despite promotion around the series, the programme never aired on TV3.

In 2011, TV3 broadcast RTL's Jack Taylor series. In 2012, TV3 and ITV co-produced Titanic with funding from the BAI. In 2013, TV3 premiered a new Irish drama Taylor Hill, the show was later aired as 'Deception' which received mixed reviews. As part of its 2012 autumn-winter season, TV3 announced it was to air its first comedy show which follow three couples embarking on couples counselling in On the Couch; This show aired in early 2013.

In 2015, TV3 broadcast the film adaptation of the play The Guarantee, which explores the Irish Banking collapse in the late 2000s.

In 2016, a three-part Irish produced series titled Smalltown aired on the channel starring Pat Shortt.

==== Soap opera ====
In late 2009, following the cancellation of RTÉ's critically acclaimed medical drama series The Clinic TV3 speculated at reviving the show as a soap rather than a serial. TV3 later confirmed it would not seek to revive the show.

TV3 tendered for a production company to produce a new weekly soap for the channel, which would air from 2015. UK production houses Lime Productions (Hollyoaks) and Zodiak Media (Being Human) along with Irish production houses Element Pictures (Pure Mule) and Parallel Films (The Clinic) were among 16 tenders brought to TV3 for the new soap. According to The Sunday Times, 2 March 2014, TV3 sent a letter of intent to Element Pictures and Company Pictures to produce the new soap. Filming was to begin in the summer of 2014.

Virgin Media Ireland's main soap was Red Rock. It began filming in October 2014 and began airing in January 2015. It aired on Wednesday and Thursday nights at 20:30. It is set in a fictional fishing village in Dublin. The series was partly funded through the licence fee by the Broadcasting Authority of Ireland, funding up to 18% of costs. The series cost about €4.4million to produce 104 episodes. The series took a break during the summer months. However, in 2017 the channel confirmed this soap would end the final episodes were spread out between 2018 and late 2019.

=== Youth and music programming ===
When it launched TV3 aired a strand of programming called Gimme 3, targeting 6-12-year-olds between 16:00 to 17:00 and every Sunday from 07:30 to 10:00. It was presented by Hector Ó hEochagáin and Clodagh Freeman. The strand aired programming such as The Ren & Stimpy Show, Conan the Adventurer, Conan and the Young Warriors, The Hot Rod Dogs and Cool Car Cats, Loggerheads, Salty's Lighthouse and The Brothers Flub. Gimme 3 was cancelled in 1999, but cartoons remained on the channel every weekend morning until 2003. One month into its existence, the channel's children's programming was minimal in comparison to Network 2's.

On Saturday mornings the channel aired teenage-skewed programming between 08:00 to 11:00, airing shows such as The Adventures of Pete & Pete, City Guys, One World, Malibu, CA and USA High. Exam Countdown, presented by Ray D'Arcy, was shown for 4 weeks in 2001at 10:30am on Saturday and Sunday, as it led up to the Leaving Certificate Exams.

On bank holidays and during the December holiday period, TV3 regularly airs films targeting kids and families. In press reports TV3 are expected to launch a children's channel called 3Kids as part of its digital channels which were expected to launch in 2013. As of August 2013, TV3 has failed to announce a launch date for the channel at its autumn 2013 press call. In June 2016, 3Kids launched as its own programming block initially on 3e before moving to be3 in January 2017 following the launch of the latter.

In 1998, TV3 aired its own version of the pan-European chart music show Pepsi Chart Show which featured live performances from the Top 40 singles chart. It was broadcast mainly in London and was hosted by Sarah O'Flaherty. Every Saturday morning at 10:00 (and Thursday at midnight), TV3 aired a music video show hosted by Darragh Purcell called Pop on 3 which had a broad music policy. This was later replaced by The Sound Room, also hosted by Darragh Purcell.

In 2001, Dynamite TV aired on Sunday afternoons at 17:00, with repeats on Saturday mornings at 11:00. This show had no presenter or voice-overs, just providing text on screen to go along with the music videos which were mainly Top 40 songs.

In 2003, similar to Video Hits on Australian television, TV3 aired a music video show called Music3 (pronounced as "Music Cubed") where viewers selected their favourite music videos from a list shown on 3Text and occasionally on screen. The show aired every night between 01:00 to 04:00 and running from July to December. Viewers were invited to send text messages to the show and to send in requests via a premium rate phone number.

=== Factual programming ===
In early 2008, TV3 made a commitment to producing factual programming. The first major documentary was Me and The Big C, charting people's struggle with cancer; Inside and Out, a makeover show hosted by Sinead O' Carroll; Dirty Money: The Story of the Criminal Assets Bureau, a crime documentary fronted by Paul Williams; and Diary of... which followed six people as they went through life-changing events.

The autumn 2008 schedule continued this trend, with several Irish produced series including Now Then: How the Irish Have Sex; CCTV Cities with Donal MacIntyre; Living With Murder, presented by Maura Derrane; and Corrupt, examining corruption in Ireland. Crunch Time was a three-part documentary exploring Ireland's property crisis.

Many of TV3's factual programming is produced with the assistance of the licence fee through the BCI's Sound and Vision Fund or are produced in house by TV3's News and Information Department. The Cosmetic Surgery Show, which looks at the world of cosmetic surgery, presented by Dr. 90210 and Caroline Morahan, was broadcast in 2009. TV3 introduced Paul Connolly Investigates, a series of investigative journalist documentaries which focuses on crime and deviance in Ireland.

TV3 announced a raft of TV documentaries in 2011 including The Irish of 9/11, The Hospice, Paul Connolly Investigates, Anatomy of a Car Crash, Challenging God, 24 Hours to Kill, The Day the Germans Bombed Dublin, The Rise and Fall of Fianna Fáil, Sex Lives, Hen Parties, Paddies in Paradise, Strictly Irish Dancing, Ireland's Disco Kids, Dejunk Your Life and Ireland's Top Teens.

In 2012 and 2013 TV3 introduced further factual programming including Challenging God, a Vincent Browne-hosted series which questions the validity of God in 21st-century Ireland. New documentary series include The Estate, which looks at life in a low-income neighbourhood; In the Name of the Republic; Michaela: The Search for Justice; Sex and the Gaelteact.

As of 2014 the station has a new department Public Affairs and Documentary Unit which will broadcast a weekly investigative series. This took over factual programming from its News and Information Department.

=== Lifestyle ===
- Life was a new prime time weekly show set to begin airing in February 2015. TV3 had announced Life as a daily half hour to broadcast at 19:30 Monday to Friday. By early 2015, TV3 confirmed the show would not go ahead originally as planned but would broadcast for a short six-week run each Friday from 20:00. Life was expected to be hosted by TV3's Aisling O'Loughlin and Sybil Mulcahy, but instead Mulcahy took on the presenting role for the six-week run. As of spring 2015, Mulcahy has confirmed her departure from TV3 taking effect from late summer 2015.
- TV3 announced in January 2015 that its afternoon show Late Lunch Live would be dropped in favour of The 7 O'Clock Show, which will air at 19:00 for an hour Monday to Friday on TV3.
- In a special upfront event in June 2015, The Great Irish Menu and House Rules would make-up some of the channel's autumn/winter schedule. Neither shows were produced.

=== Acquired programming ===
==== Soaps 1998–2014 ====
===== Daytime =====
- The Bold and The Beautiful (1999 – 2010s)
- Breakers (1998–1999)
- Family Affairs (1998–2007)
- Sunset Beach (20 September 1998 – 30 August 2002)
- The Young and The Restless (2003 – 2010s)

===== Prime time =====
- Coronation Street (2001–2014, 2016–)
- EastEnders (1998–2001)
- Emmerdale (2001–2014, 2016 -)
- Hollyoaks (2007)
- The Royal Today (2008)

==== 1998–2001 ====
From the outset TV3 relied heavily on acquiring programming from other countries. Prior to the channel's launch TV3 signed agreements with big US broadcasters to air first rights of Sex and the City, Buffy the Vampire Slayer, JAG, FX, The Net, South Park and Just Shoot Me!. TV3 has also relied on acquisitions from the UK and Australia. In its early days the channel aired two popular UK dramas, Family Affairs (broadcast 18 months after Channel 5) and EastEnders (broadcast with advertising simultaneously with BBC One), and also the short-lived Australian soap Breakers and the US soap Sunset Beach.

Since 1999, TV3 has a long-term agreement with Big Ticket Television to broadcast Judge Judy. New episodes air weekdays at 16:30 and 17:00.

==== 2001–2006 ====
In 2000 Granada plc (now ITV) acquired 45% share in TV3. Under an agreement with Granada many of ITV's programming began to simulcast on TV3 from 2001, such as Coronation Street and Emmerdale (both previously aired on RTÉ One), Bad Girls and Footballers' Wives.

TV3 secured a long-term agreement with Harpo Studios from RTÉ Television to hold the Irish broadcasting rights to The Oprah Winfrey Show until it ceased broadcasting.

==== 2006–2009 ====
In 2006, upon ITV selling its share of TV3 to Doughty Hanson, ITV signed a long-term agreement which secured the continued simulcast of key ITV programming such as The Jeremy Kyle Show, The X Factor, Dancing on Ice,I'm a Celebrity...Get Me Out of Here! and Britain's Got Talent.

Following the cancellation of Family Affairs in June 2007, it was initially replaced by Channel 4's Hollyoaks. Broadcasting the teen soap opera proved very unsuccessful for the channel and it was axed within a month to be replaced by The Royal Today, and after the cancellation of The Royal Today by repeats of the US sitcom Friends.

The Ellen DeGeneres Show airs on both TV3 and 3e under a long-term broadcasting agreement with NBC/Warner Brothers Studios, however the show moved to RTÉ One in 2017. TV3 also holds an agreement with TLC to broadcast selected programming from its daytime schedule.

==== 2009–2014 ====
A number of new shows were added to the TV3 schedule from 2009 to 2014. TV3 signed a distribution deal with ITV, BBC and Fox.

- American Idol
- America's Got Talent
- Bondi Rescue (2014; moved to 3e)
- Broadchurch
- Come Dine with Me (2010–2013)
- Crisis (2014)
- Downton Abbey (2009–2015)
- Friends (2010–2014)
- Glee (2010–2015)
- The Graham Norton Show (2010–2014)
- Law & Order: Special Victims Unit
- Modern Family
- Over the Rainbow (2010)
- Prime Suspect
- V (2009–2010)
- The X Factor US

In 2013, it was announced that TV3 would be losing many of its ITV Studios programming to UTV by early 2015. On 6 November 2013, UTV Media announced its plans to launch a new television channel within the Republic of Ireland by January 2015. UTV Ireland serves audiences within the Republic of Ireland along with its existing Northern Ireland service UTV. As part of this announcement UTV Ireland Ltd confirmed it secured Irish broadcasting rights to key programming from ITV Studios Global Entertainment (including Emmerdale, Coronation Street, Jeremy Kyle among other shows). From early 2015, TV3 withdrew such programming from its existing schedule. Upon announcement of the new channel it was welcomed by TV3 Group's CEO David McRedmond, saying he welcomed the opportunity to reinvest funds previously spent on ITV programming and investing more home grown independent productions.

==== 2015–2018 ====
Virgin Media Ireland continue to hold a number of rights to ITV programming not produced or distributed by ITV Studios. The X Factor and Downton Abbey returned to the station in 2015. TV3 aired Nothing to Declare at 19:30 Monday to Friday until February 2015, when it was replaced by Late Lunch Live. Broadchurch aired Monday nights at 22:00.

Judge Judy remains on TV3 and has been its highest rated daytime schedule programme since its inception in 1998. Re-runs of The Jeremy Kyle Show have now ended. Tipping Point is broadcast by the channel.

Late night TV includes re-runs of Law & Order: SVU which has been part of the TV3 schedule since it began.

Prime time programming includes Tipping Point spin off Tipping Point:Lucky Stars, Off Their Rockers, All Star Family Fortune, The Cube and Australian Drama Wentworth Prison.

Virgin Media Ireland has rights to both the UK edition of The X Factor and Got Talent until 2016 with the opportunity to extend. It also holds rights to airing the US version of Got Talent. TV3 has signed a deal with 20th Century Fox to broadcast its new movie releases.

On 29 November 2014 TV3 Group launched its #NewDawn campaign which is part of its rebrand and new schedule for 2015. The campaign was launched with a 90-second and 60-second TV3 promo which aired at 19:45 on TV3. A trailer promoting the newly produced drama series Red Rock was also revealed.

TV3 announced in May 2015 that it had acquired the rights to air Big Brother UK and Celebrity Big Brother UK. This marks the first time Big Brother has aired on an Irish TV channel, while being available to more Irish audiences since the show transferred from Channel 4 to Channel 5 in 2011.

== On-air presentation ==
=== September 1998 – July 2000 ===
The original logo and design for the channel were devised by Dynamo. In the lead-up to the network's launch, TV3's logo was unveiled on 7 May 1998 and, weeks later, was seen during promotion ads on RTÉ and TnaG. The logo consisted of a redesigned number 3. The upper half of the 3 was separated from the lower half; the two halves came together to form two swooshing arches that would form the 3. There were a number of different idents from September 1998 to July 2000 including 'Bubbles', 'Camera Lenses', 'Robot', 'Umbrella', 'Fan', 'Planets', 'Children's Toy', 'Bumper Cars' and 'Roller-Coaster'. Each of the idents would end with a girl whispering the word 'three' a number of times.

=== July 2000 – September 2003 ===
In July 2000, TV3 developed new idents. The new idents removed the words 'TV' and 'three' from beneath the stylized 3 logo. The project was directed by Dynamo's creative head of broadcast media, Brian Williams. These were TV3's first idents to feature live action – actors would be seen in the background of the logo doing various day-to-day activities with the 3 logo spinning around to reveal itself. In 2001, some of these idents would have characters from ITV programming appear in the background, such as characters from Coronation Street, Emmerdale and Heartbeat.

=== September 2003 – March 2006 ===
In September 2003, TV3 again launched a new set of idents. Again, this series of idents consisted of live action scenes. The final scene would see a large 'swoosh' effect in the center of the screen with the 3 logo appearing in the centre of the screen. These idents consisted of outdoor activities such as a walk at the beach, children playing football, children playing, people walking over the Ha'penny Bridge etc. The presentation package was produced by Bruce Dunlop Associates.

=== March 2006 – January 2009 ===
In March 2006, TV3 took steps to rebrand, as Channel 6 launched in an attempt to become a competitor in the Irish market. These idents consisted of live action scenes often involving the number 3 such as three drops of water into a river. The 3 logo now moved from just the stylized 3 into three circles with the stylized 3 in the last circle. The presentation package was produced by Cleverality.

=== January – August 2009 ===
On 5 January 2009, TV3 unveiled its new station logo – a simple sans-serif number 3 similar in style to that of TV3's logo. This revamp coincided with the launch of 3e; TV3 adopted the new look during the first commercial break of News at 5.30. Officially, the TV3 logo is that of a box with a 3 cut out of the right hand side – this design is used on all news programmes. However, the idents consisted of a set of simple graphical 3s in a domino effect with different colours such as grey, purple and blue. The idents were produced by Image Now.

=== August 2009 – August 2011 ===
Between August 2009 and February 2010 TV3 introduced 8 new idents. The first two idents – known as 'Orchard' and 'Escalator' – launched TV3's live action idents. In September, a third ident entitled 'Wave' was added, followed in October by a fourth ident known as 'Bridge'. An edited version of the Bridge ident (to promote the series V), a sixth new ident known as 'Dog' was introduced in November 2009 and in December 2009 the ident 'snowman' was added and in February 2010 the 8th ident was added, 'bubbles'. TV3 has been working with Image Now to create these idents.

=== August 2011 – January 2015 ===
On Monday, 22 August 2011, TV3 revealed a new on-air look. While utilising its existing logo, TV3 revealed new idents which are computer-generated and based around specific themes (e.g.: crime, urban, entertainment). The new look idents were designed by Image Now, who have previously worked on the channel's branding since 2009.

=== January 2015 – December 2016 ===
On Monday, 5 January 2015, TV3 revealed a new on-air look to coincide with its new programming. Originally the new idents consisted of only two idents. Gradually TV3 added additional idents featuring TV3 presenters. One of the original idents features a neon TV3 logo in a purple room and the second ident features a scene from its new soap Redrock. The slogan 'We Entertain' features heavily on-air and in promos.

=== January 2017 – August 2018 ===
On 6 December 2016, it was announced that TV3, along with 3e and its newly purchased channel UTV Ireland, will receive new logos, idents and new schedules. New Director of Programming Bill Malone announced that TV3 will become a more mature channel. "TV3 will become the premium channel, the grown up channel and 3e will become, well, what TV3 is now".

On 9 January 2017, TV3 Group revealed a new on-air presentation featuring the number 3 superimposed on various natural and urban landscapes across Ireland. A new logo was also revealed along with new promos and on-screen graphics. Similarly, new identities were introduced to 3e and its new station be3.

=== August 2018 – present ===
On 28 June 2018, it was announced that TV3 will become Virgin Media One, while its sister channels 3e and be3 will become Virgin Media Two and Three respectively. A fourth pay TV sports channel will also become available on the Virgin Media platform, called Virgin Media Sport.

On 2 September 2024, the channel got a new look following the rebrand of Virgin Media Player as Virgin Media Play, there were only two idents at launch, featuring glass and ribbons forming the logo. A third ident featuring marbles forming the logo was introduced in October 2024.

=== Continuity announcers ===
TV3's continuity is largely pre-recorded unlike its competitor RTÉ One. Taragh Loughrey-Grant began as a continuity presenter on TV3 in 1999 and was the voice of TV3 until 2005, where she later moved onto radio and then onto Channel 6 (prior to TV3 Group purchasing the channel). She then went onto present RTÉ Ten from 2008 onward and regularly contributes to RTÉ Radio and television.

Conor Clear and Andrea Hayes followed as continuity presenters. In 2008, TV3 introduced in-vision continuity links during the 3 Daytime. Hayes began as a guest on the Midday panel in summer 2013. She also works on Dublin's Sunshine FM. Conor Clear also acts as a weather presenter. Clare McKenna is a voiceover artist and has been working for TV3 since 2006. In 2013, McKenna begun a career as television presenting on Ireland AM whilst covering for Anna Daly when she was on her maternity leave. Upon Daly's, return McKenna left Ireland AM so she could take up her own maternity leave. McKenna returned to TV3 in late 2014 reprising her role as a voice-over for TV3 promotions.

Daytime in-vision continuity lasted until the end of 2009.

== Controversies ==
=== Lack of original programming ===
In the early years of TV3, many media commentators criticised the lack of original programming on the station. Since 2008, TV3 has increased its production of Irish programming. The view of many commentators such as Stephen Price of The Sunday Times and Tom McGurk of The Sunday Business Post is that TV3 needs to differentiate itself in the growing Irish multi-channel market by making more original programming.

=== Play TV and Brainbox ===
Play TV was an interactive phone-in quiz show on TV3; it ran from May 2009 until March 2010.

On 21 September 2009, callers to the Liveline radio show on RTÉ Radio 1 complained about the phone charges and methods surrounding TV3's late night quiz show Play TV. Host Joe Duffy stated that many of his listeners and callers to the show had not got a satisfactory reply from TV3 in relation to their complaints and hence his reason for this section of his show, and that TV3 was unwilling to be a part of the discussion show having been asked by RTÉ Radio. Some of the contestants had not been paid their prize money. TV3 advised viewers who played the game to go to RegTel with any complaints.

On 25 September 2009, the Broadcasting Authority of Ireland (BAI) met to review 20 complaints made to it by individuals in relation to Play TV; 15 were upheld, one was rejected, one was determined to be invalid and two remained under investigation.

In January 2010, the compliance committee of the Broadcasting Authority of Ireland upheld 10 more complaints against TV3. In February, the BAI upheld three more complaints.

On 5 March 2010, TV3 announced that Play TV's contract was terminated immediately. In their statement, they put the removal of the "infomercial" down purely to audience figures rather than the complaints received and upheld by the BAI. They did not apologise for their conduct.

At the launch of TV3's Autumn (18 August 2010) schedule, David McRedmond (CEO of TV3) was interviewed by The Irish Times. He admitted mistakes had been made but and admitted that Play TV was axed not just due to falling audience figures but also to the bad press and the regulator's constant scrutiny of the show. He still refused to apologise to viewers on behalf of TV3, again stating that "it was an essential part of getting us through the recession", regardless of what the BAI called a "misleading and unfair" programme.

Brain Box is an interactive phone-in quiz show on UTV and STV. As part of the 2010 Autumn schedule, TV3 announced the re-broadcast of UTV's Brainbox TV show. The show began airing on TV3 on 9 September 2010, just 7 months after the axing of the controversial Play TV. It ceased broadcasting less than a week later.

=== Health of Brian Lenihan ===
On Saturday, 26 December 2009, TV3 News announced that it had been informed that the then Minister for Finance Brian Lenihan was suffering from a serious illness. The announcement was made according to TV3 as it was for the public good, but many people were outraged at the way it was announced on TV3.

Senior government sources spoke of "outrage" across the political spectrum at the insensitive content and tone of a news bulletin broadcast, which the station had earlier flagged as a "news story of national importance". However, the station's decision was defended by The Irish Times and the political magazine The Phoenix. The BAI ruled in favour of TV3 in relation to this announcement, rejecting all 14 complaints made against TV3 to the regulator.

TV3 at the time also stated that the bulletin was a normal bulletin that would normally run at 5:30. However TV3 are not known to have produced a news bulletin on St. Stephen's Day (a bank holiday in Ireland) and since 2006 had reduced weekend bulletins to five minutes.

=== Psychic Readings Live ===
Psychic Readings Live was a phone-in programme broadcast June–December 2012. It was much criticised for some apparently faked callers and psychics and for playing on the hopes and fears of some viewers. Complaints about it were upheld by the Broadcasting Authority of Ireland, and it was cancelled in December 2012.

== On-air identity ==
(2009–2017)

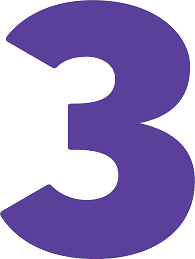
(2017–2018)

(2018–Present)

== See also ==
- Virgin Media Two
- List of television channels available in Ireland
- List of programmes broadcast by Virgin Media Television (Ireland)
