= List of The Podge and Rodge Show episodes =

This is a list of episodes of The Podge and Rodge Show, with airdates and the relevant guests of the episode in question.

A talk show broadcast and produced by RTÉ, for the first three seasons Podge and Rodge were joined by Lucy Kennedy as a co-host. In the fourth season up until Christmas 2008, they were joined by female guest hosts following Kennedy's departure. Caroline Morahan joined as co-host when the fourth season returned on 9 February 2009. The programme aired each Monday and Tuesday at 22:50 on RTÉ Two from February to April and from October to December with a hiatus during the summer months. The fourth season began on 20 October 2008 and ended on 14 April 2009 and was the last to be filmed in then original Ballydung Manor set. Season five was a truncated season shot in the Stickit Inn set. As part of RTÉ's 2018's autumn launch it was announced that The Podge and Rodge Show would be returning after an eight-year break for a sixth season with new co-host Doireann Garrihy starting on 22 October 2018.

Set in Ballydung Manor, the brothers' home in the village of Ballydung in County Ring, as well as celebrity interviews of a humorous nature it also involved quizzes, reviews, news, music and talent contests, as well as racenights involving among other entities hamsters in mazes, sheep shearing and tractors. During early episodes, with the credits rolling, it was common for the two to tell viewers to direct their complaints elsewhere, e.g. RTÉ or The Joe Duffy Show. The programme's popularity was reflected on the Irish Singles Chart, as The Saw Doctors reached number one on 17 October 2008 with the song "About You Now", first performed on The Podge and Rodge Show as a dare during the "Rock N' Roulette" feature of series three.

== Season one ==
S#	Ep#	Guests	Original airdate
1	1	Diarmuid Gavin, David Norris	2006-02-06
1	2	Dave Fanning, Marisa Mackle	2006-02-07
1	3	Aoibhinn Ní Shúilleabháin, Larry Gogan	2006-02-13
1	4	Gavin Lambe-Murphy, Bláthnaid Ní Chofaigh	2006-02-14
1	5	Dickie Rock, Donna and Joseph McCaul	2006-02-20
1	6	Jon Kenny, Frances Black	2006-02-21
1	7	Tom Dunne, Anna Nolan	2006-02-27
1	8	Síle Seoige, Paolo Tullio	2006-02-28
1	9	Fergus Gibson, Tatania Ouliankana	2006-03-06
1	10	Foster and Allen, Mario Rosenstock	2006-03-07
1	11	Jerry Fish, Martin King	2006-03-13
1	12	Robert O'Byrne, Keith Duffy	2006-03-14
1	13	Barry McGuigan, Pamela Flood	2006-03-20
1	14	Ian Dempsey, Anne Charleston	2006-03-21
1	15	Ray Shah, Brendan O'Carroll	2006-03-27
1	16	Mary McEvoy, Red Hurley	2006-03-28
1	17	Kathryn Thomas, Marty Morrissey	2006-04-03
1	18	Father Brian D'Arcy, Joe Dolan	2006-04-04
1	19	Trevor Sargent, Ronnie Drew	2006-04-10
1	20	Gerry Ryan, Finbar Wright	2006-04-11
1	21	Áine Chambers, Simon Delaney	2006-04-18
1	22	Mary O'Conor, Joe Duffy	2006-04-24
1	23	Fran Cosgrave, Hazel O'Connor	2006-04-25
1	24	Jodie Marsh, PJ Gallagher	2006-05-01
1	25	Amanda Brunker, Johnny Vegas	2006-05-02

* The Áine Chambers episode was pre-recorded as there was only one show due to the Easter schedule - there was no episode on April 19.

== Season two ==
S#	Ep#	Guests	Original airdate
2	1	Coleen Nolan, Spiral	2006-10-16
2	2	The Cheeky Girls, Mickey Joe Harte	2006-10-17
2	3	Brenda Donohue, Freddie Starr	2006-10-23
2	4	Rosanna Davison, Johnny Logan	2006-10-24
2	5	Brigitte Nielsen, Hector Ó hEochagáin	2006-10-30
2	6	Toni the Exotic Dancer, Henry Kelly	2006-10-31
2	7	Don Baker, Ray D'Arcy	2006-11-06
2	8	Keith Barry, Brian Kennedy	2006-11-07
2	9	Tony Fenton, Chris Brosnan	2006-11-13
2	10	Caroline Morahan, Tony Hadley	2006-11-14
2	11	Ken Doherty, Daithí Ó Sé	2006-11-20
2	12	TR Dallas, Leslie Grantham	2006-11-21
2	13	Maeve Higgins, Bernard Dunne	2006-11-27
2	14	Brendan Shine, Rebecca Loos	2006-11-28
2	15	Margo O'Donnell, Patrick Kielty	2006-12-04
2	16	Claudia Carroll, Dara Ó Briain	2006-12-05
2	17	Sean Moncrieff, Colin Carroll	2006-12-11
2	18	Christy Dignam, Andrea Roche	2006-12-12
2	19	Brendan Bowyer, Des Bishop	2006-12-18
2	20	June Rodgers, George Murphy, Shane MacGowan	2006-12-19
2	21	New Year's Eve Special: Mary Black, Edele Lynch, Keavy Lynch, Jason Donovan, Freddie Starr	2006-12-31
		MID-SEASON HIATUS	
2	22	Joe Rooney, John McCririck	2007-02-05
2	23	Sarah Morrissey, Niall Toibin	2007-02-06
2	24	Arthur Murphy, Jason Byrne	2007-02-12
2	25	Lorraine Keane, Frank Carson	2007-02-13
2	26	Jayne Middlemiss, Roy Walker	2007-02-19
2	27	Sheana Keane, Russell Grant	2007-02-20
2	28	Mick O'Dwyer, David Mitchell	2007-02-27
2	29	Paul Daniels, Jason McAteer	2007-03-05
2	30	Glenda Gilson, Jimmy Nesbitt, Frank Sidebottom	2007-03-06
2	31	Paul Byrom, Suzi Quatro	2007-03-12
2	32	Eanna Ni Lamhna, Ryan Tubridy	2007-03-13
2	33	Sinéad O'Connor, Ronan Collins	2007-03-19
2	34	Andrew Maxwell, Bez	2007-03-20
2	35	Stephen Rea, Craig Doyle	2007-03-26
2	36	Karl Spain, Limahl	2007-03-27
2	37	Joe O'Shea, Deirdre O'Kane	2007-04-02
2	38	Pauline McLynn, Paul Costelloe	2007-04-03
2	39	Right Said Fred, Katy French	2007-04-09
2	40	Richard Schiff, Biff Byford	2007-04-10

* There was no episode on Monday February 26 due to the Oscars being broadcast that evening. The second series ran until April 10, before the highly successful "Desperate for Housewives Tour" restarted at Vicar Street.

Guests that never were
The following were also confirmed as guests in series two, but their order of appearance and episodes were never confirmed. In the end they did not appear, Big Tom's excuse was that he had been ill and hospitalised:
- Bob Geldof
- Big Tom

== Season three ==
S#	Ep#	Guests	Rock 'N' Roulette	Original airdate
3	1	Sam and Amanda Marchant, Maura Derrane		2007-10-15
3	2	Jim Bartley, Anneka Rice	Republic of Loose	2007-10-16
3	3	Mr. Pussy, Siân Lloyd		2007-10-22
3	4	Keith Chegwin, Seán Bán Breathnach	Warlords of Pez	2007-10-23
3	5	Alex Best, Brendan Balfe, Aidan Walshe		2007-10-29
3	6	Yvonne Costello, Steve Schirripa	Ham Sandwich	2007-10-30
3	7	Pete Burns, Celia Holman Lee, Chris Pontius & his band Scream for Me		2007-11-05
3	8	Toyah Willcox, Liam Ó Maonlaí	Delorentos	2007-11-06
3	9	Mary Coughlan, Cleo Rocos		2007-11-12
3	10	Cheryl Baker, Derek Davis	Future Kings of Spain	2007-11-13
3	11	Tony Cascarino, Buster Bloodvessel		2007-11-19
3	12	Dennis Taylor, Tríona McCarthy	The Flaws	2007-11-20
3	13	Tracey Cox, David McWilliams		2007-11-26
3	14	Kevin Myers, Eddie "The Eagle" Edwards	The Coronas	2007-11-27
3	15	Wendy Richard, Dominic Mafham		2007-12-03
3	16	Jermaine Jackson, Laurence Llewelyn Bowen	Director	2007-12-04
3	17	Colm & Jim-Jim, Sally Lindsay		2007-12-10
3	18	Terry Christian, Paul Williams	The Frank and Walters	2007-12-11
3	19	Brian Dowling, Gemma Craven		2007-12-17
3	20	Neven Maguire, Seány	Neosupervital	2007-12-18
3	21	New Year's Eve Special: Blaithnid Mc Kenna, Frank Bruno, Ding Dong Denny O'Reilly		2007-12-31
		MID-SEASON HIATUS		
3	22	Jade Goody, Páidí Ó Sé		2008-02-04
3	23	Jack Charlton, Pippa O'Connor	David Geraghty	2007-02-05
3	24	Gerald Kean, Monica Loughman		2008-02-11
3	25	Shane Byrne, Don Wycherley	The Saw Doctors	2008-02-12
3	26	Calum Best, Fiona Looney		2008-02-18
3	27	Moya Brennan, Victoria Mary Clarke	Juno Falls	2008-02-19
3	28	Vanessa Feltz, Eileen Reid		2008-02-26
3	29	Samantha Fox, Dr. Mark Hamilton		2008-03-03
3	30	Michelle Heaton, Declan Buckley	Pugwash	2008-03-04
3	31	Bruce Jones, Kevin Sharkey		2008-03-10
3	32	Ron Jeremy, Ivan Yates	The Pale	2008-03-11
3	33	Sean Maguire, Nick Pickard		2008-03-17
3	34	Jasmine Guinness, Alvin Stardust	Alphastates	2008-03-18
3	35	Danielle Lloyd, BP Fallon, Margo		2008-03-24
3	36	Bronagh Gallager, Loyd Grossman	Stagger Lee	2008-03-25
3	37	Johnny Vegas, Michael Healy-Rae		2008-03-31
3	38	Katherine Lynch, Michael Carruth	Paranoid Visions	2008-04-01
3	39	Kevin Kennedy, Brian Ormond		2008-04-07
3	40	Christopher Biggins, Jimmy Magee	Super Extra Bonus Party	2008-04-08
3	41	Jack Charlton special		2008-04-14
3	42	The 2008 Golden Loggie Awards		2008-04-15

- Jackass star Chris Pontius a.k.a. Party Boy and his band Scream for Me, who were touring Ireland in November 2007, made a special surprise appearance on 5 November 2007 episode and performed their song "Karazy".
- There was no episode on Monday 25 February due to the Academy Awards being broadcast that evening.
- Series 3, Episode 35 broadcast on 24 March 2008, was the official 100th episode of The Podge & Rodge Show.
- Johnny Vegas became the first guest to return to the show.

== Season four ==
The fourth season introduced the concept of the female guest host after Lucy Kennedy's decision to leave the show. Each guest host presented two shows and were obliged to be female. These included Michelle Heaton, Pamela Flood, Amanda Bonkher, Mary McEvoy, Donna McCaul, Rosanna Davison and Bláthnaid Ní Chofaigh. Every second show featured a new slot, "Rhyme Bandits", in which a well-known singer switched genre and performed in the guise of their selected artist in a style reminiscent of Stars in Their Eyes.

Upon the show's return on 9 February 2009, Podge & Rodge were joined by Caroline Morahan as the new "Lady of Ballydung Manor" for the remaining ten weeks of season four (from Ep.4.21). The musical item 'Rock 'n' Roulette from Season three returned as 'Rockin' Recession Roulette' where up and coming Irish bands performed cover versions of Podge and Rodge's choosing. Tuesday nights saw a new item entitled The Antiques Gameshow where old Irish TV game shows were resurrected and given a Ballydung twist. For instance, geography quiz Where in the World? became an anatomical quiz Where on the Girl?.

S#	Ep#	Host	Guests	Rhyme Bandits	Original airdate
4	1	Michelle Heaton	Kenny Egan, Bianca Gascoigne	Johnny Logan as John Legend	2008-10-20
4	2	Michelle Heaton	Bazil Ashmawy, Nikki Grahame		2008-10-21
4	3	Pamela Flood	Lee Sharpe, Duncan & Tania Stewart	Kathy Durkin as Pink	2008-10-27
4	4	Pamela Flood	Dirk Benedict, Laura Bermingham		2008-10-28
4	5	Amanda Brunker	Claire Tully, Leo & Davy Sawdoctor	Sandy Kelly as Katy Perry	2008-11-03
4	6	Amanda Brunker	Daithí Ó Sé, Anne Gildea		2008-11-04
4	7	Mary McEvoy	Charley Boorman, Verne Troyer	Charlie McGettigan as Jim Morrison	2008-11-10
4	8	Mary McEvoy	Gemma Atkinson, Devon Murray		2008-11-11
4	9	Donna McCaul	Alan Stanford, Gail Porter	Joseph McCaul as Prince	2008-11-17^{1}
4	10	Rosanna Davison	Jennifer Maguire, Paddy Courtney	Philomena Begley as Amy Winehouse	2008-11-24
4	11	Rosanna Davison	Shakin' Stevens, Chrys Columbine		2008-11-25
4	12	Bláthnaid Ní Chofaigh	Róisín Murphy, Louis Copeland	TR Dallas as Robbie Williams	2008-12-01
4	13	Bláthnaid Ní Chofaigh	Bonnie Tyler, Ray Houghton		2008-12-02
4	14	Rebecca Loos	Duncan James, Eva Birthistle	Robotnik	2008-12-08
4	15	Rebecca Loos	Steve Wall, Liz McClarnon		2008-12-09
4	16	Caroline Morahan	Gary Cooke, Susan McFadden	Brutus Gold's Love Train	2008-12-15
4	17	Caroline Morahan	John McColgan, Una Healy		2008-12-16
4	18	Anna Nolan	Adam Woodyatt, Laura Whitmore	The Corrigans (performing "There's No One As Irish As Barack O'Bama")	2008-12-22
4	19	Anna Nolan	Aggie MacKenzie, Tom Doorley, Stereophonics		2008-12-23
4	20	Twink	Mark Lester, Mario Rosenstock	The Stunning	2008-12-26
			MID-SEASON HIATUS		

1. There was no episode on 18 November 2008 due to a Munster v. All Blacks rugby game at Thomond Park. An episode of Prison Break was subsequently broadcast in the show's usual slot. There were also no episodes on 29 December and 30 December.

S#	Ep#	Guests	Rock 'N' Recession Roulette	Original airdate
4	21	Timmy Mallet, George McMahon	Dirty Epics (performing Rick James - "Superfreak")	2009-02-09
4	22	Willie Daly, Camille O'Sullivan		2009-02-10
4	23	David Van Day, Mr. Lordi	The Radiators From Space (performing Van Morrison's - "Gloria")	2009-02-16
4	24	Donal MacIntyre, Eddi Reader		2009-02-17
4	25	Abi Titmus, Pat Falvey	Pony Club (performing Girls Aloud's - "The Promise")	2009-02-23
4	26	Justin Hawkins, John Creedon		2009-02-24
4	27	Malcolm Maclaren, Michelle Doherty	Readers Wives (performing The Ronettes - "Be My Baby")	2009-03-02
4	28	Nicola McLean, The High Kings		2009-03-03
4	29	John Altman, Morgan Jones	DC Tempest (performing Carl Douglas - "Kung Fu Fighting")	2009-03-09
4	30	Jim Fitzpatrick, Hugh Cornwell		2009-03-10
4	31	Coolio, Mo Kelly		2009-03-16
4	32	Caprice, Mr.Motivator		2009-03-17
4	33	Gavin Duffy, Mairead Farrell	Cowboy X (performing Kim Wilde - "Kids in America")	2009-03-23
4	34	John Aldridge, Dane Bowers		2009-03-24
4	35	Derek Acorah, Stuart Dunne	Don Baker (performing David Bowie - "Jean Genie")	2009-03-30
4	36	Kate O'Toole, Huey Morgan		2009-03-31
4	37	Pixie McKenna, Wendi Peters	Rocky De Valera and the Gravediggers (performing The Archies - "Sugar, Sugar")	2009-04-06
4	38	Phil Daniels, Bernard Dunne		2009-04-07
4	39	Elkie Brooks, Dave Bartram	Caroline Morahan (performing Aretha Franklin - "Think")	2009-04-13
4	40	Podge & Rodge's Family Album		2009-04-14

Future guests were to include

- Peaches Geldof

== Season five ==
After the short-lived quiz show format of Podge and Rodge's Stickit Inn (see below), which reverted to a chat show mid-series, Podge and Rodge returned on 23 February 2010 for a ten-week run under the original title of The Podge and Rodge Show For the first time the show did not have a female co-host. The running time returned to the original 30-minute format but featured three celebrity guests and a music act per show.

S#	Ep#	Guests	Music Act	Original airdate
5	1	Nicola T, John Waters, Todd Carty	Talulah Does The Hula (performing The Crystals - "Da Doo Ron Ron")	2010-02-23
5	2	Simon Delaney, Dr.Eva Orsmond, Richard Dunwoody	The Corrigans (performing - "My Toyota")	2010-03-02
5	3	Keith Barry, Derek Moran, Nancy Sorrell	Aslan (performing - "This Is")	2010-03-09
5	4	Niamh Kavanagh, Claire Bergin & Aoife Hoey, Paul Ross	The DC Cowboys	2010-03-16
5	5	Adee Phelan, Ian O'Doherty, Roxanne Pallett	Readers Wives	2010-03-23
5	6	Leigh Arnold, Tabby Callaghan, Helen Lederer	The North Strand Contra Band (performing - "Whiskey in the Jar")	2010-03-30
5	7	Jayde Nicole, Kenny Baker, Fun Lovin' Criminals	Fun Lovin' Criminals (performing - "Mr.Sun")	2010-04-06
5	8	Jodie Marsh, Kamal Ibrahim, Nicholas Parsons, Neil Hannon, Thomas Walsh	The Duckworth Lewis Method (performing- Electric Light Orchestra's "Mr. Blue Sky")	2010-04-13
5	9	Georgia Salpa, Michael O'Doherty, Aiden Cooney	Owna Fortune and the Pavement Kings performing - Bill Haley's "Rock Around the Clock"	2010-04-20
5	10	Lucy Kennedy, Alicia Douvall, Nik Kershaw	Craig Walker performing Aha "Take On Me"	2010-04-27

== Season six ==
After an eight-year absence Podge and Rodge return to Ballydung Manor with co-host Doireann Garrihy.

S#	Ep#	Guests	Music Act	Original airdate
6	1	Josh Patterson, Erin McGregor	Le Galaxie playing The Buggles - "Video Killed the Radio Star"	2018-10-22
6	2	Eoghan McDermott, Kaz Crossley	State Lights playing New Radicals - "You Get What You Give"	2018-10-29
6	3	Dan Osborne, Rory Cowan	Le Boom playing Haddaway - "What Is Love"	2018-11-05
6	4	Kerry Katona, James Kavanagh	Cronin playing Dexy's Midnight Runners - "Come On Eileen"	2018-11-12
6	5	Hughie Maughan, Nadine Coyle	Rews playing 4 Non Blondes - "What's Up"	2018-11-19
6	6	Kim Woodburn, Lemar Obika	Columbia Mills playing Bronski Beat - "Smalltown Boy"	2018-11-26
6	7	Johnny Robinson, Blathnaid Treacy	Fangclub playing Babylon Zoo - "Spaceman"	2018-12-03
6	8	Melody Thornton, Jorgie Porter	N/A	2018-12-10
6	9	Derek Ryan, Megan McKenna	King Kong Company playing Human League - "Don't You Want Me"	2018-12-17
6	10	Cliona Hagan, Mateo Saina Special Guests Holly Carpenter and Marty Morrissey	Touts (band) playing Nena - "99 Red Balloons"	2018-12-24

== Seasonal specials ==
=== An Audience with Podge and Rodge (2005) ===
The precursor to The Podge and Rodge Show was broadcast on 26 December 2005 with guests Ray D'Arcy and Amanda Brunker. Music from Ding Dong Denny O'Reilly and VT inserts from various Irish personalities including Gerry Ryan, Nell McCafferty, Foster and Allen, PJ Gallagher, Mary Black with their memories and opinions of Podge and Rodge. There were also clips from A Scare at Bedtime. The show was filmed in front of a studio audience of skeletons and one man and his dog.

=== A Frightmare Before Christmas (2006) ===
Podge and Rodge hosted a special show from Ballydung Manor on 19 December, entitled A Frightmare Before Christmas. It celebrated Christmas from their perspective, a reality where none of the intended guests turned up, and imaginary scenarios where the worst possible guests did. In reality Podge and Rodge and Lucy were left in the darkness of Ballydung Manor as the thunder raged outside, imagining their nightmare guests.

Lucy dreamed of interviewing June Rodgers and lo and behold a flashback occurred featuring June being interviewed by the two. In the "imaginary" interview they made fun of her name, suggesting it had hidden pornographic innuendos. At the end of the flashback, the studio was still empty, leading Lucy to fill time by showing a special report of her interviewing people on the streets and asking them such questions as "When do you empty your sack?".

Podge then revealed his nightmare guest would be George Murphy, and in his imaginary interview an old tape was unearthed of him embarrassing himself on You're a Star. The interview was broken up by a return to reality whereby Podge had fallen asleep out of boredom.

In the second half of the show Lucy revealed the reason for the lack of guests; a plague of locusts was flocking towards the Ballydung bypass and Colin Farrell was being held up in a Moscow phone booth. Rodge's nightmare guest was revealed to be Shane MacGowan whom Rodge asked had he sold his soul to Satan. They showed him what he would look like if he had plastic surgery (including face liposuction and €3000 teeth) before comparing his new appearance to that of Christy Dignam. Podge and Rodge joined George Murphy to sing out the show with "The Irish Rover".

=== Bogmanay (2006) ===
Podge and Rodge rang in 2007 on 31 December 2006/1 January 2007 in a special programme lasting over forty minutes instead of the usual thirty-minute format. The New Year's Eve show was called Bogmanay (a play on Hogmanay). It was broadcast on RTÉ Two from 11.30p.m.

On it the boys looked back at some of the highlights of their year. They also handed out their very own Feckin' Eejit of the Year Awards (FEEJITs) to celebrate the great tradition of Irish Feckin' Eejitry. There were nine nominees chosen from the worlds of TV, entertainment, sport and politics.

Guests included Edele and Keavy Lynch of B*Witched fame, Mary Black, Jason Donovan and Freddie Starr returned as the Ballydung Butler for the evening.

=== Bogmanay II (2007) ===
Such was the success of the original Bogmanay, Podge and Rodge hosted a second Bogmanay to ring in 2008. It featured guests Miss Ireland, Bláthnaid McKenna and boxer Frank Bruno as well as Mr. Gest who was unable to be interviewed as Lucy Kennedy, venturing into his dressing room, discovered he had turned into an ape. Instead a number of previously unseen clips which were not allowed to be shown before midnight were shown, including some in which Lucy Kennedy swore. A number of "Half- Arse Hero" awards were handed out, although none of the recipients (who included Steve Staunton) were present to accept them.

=== Podge and Rodge's Christmas Craic (2008) ===
Twink guest hosted this 26 December special. The O'Leprosy brothers were joined by osteopath and film star Mark Lester, impressionist Mario Rosenstock and music from The Stunning, who resurrected the "Rock 'N' Roulette" feature of the previous series to sing the Slade song "Merry Xmas Everybody". The show attracted 271,000 viewers.

== Podge and Rodge's Stickit Inn ==
A pub quiz for the first four episodes, by the fifth episode it had reverted to a comedy chat show similar to The Podge and Rodge Show but based in the Stickit Inn pub set.

S#	Ep#	Guests	Rapper in the Crapper	Musical Guest	Original airdate
1	1	Gerald Kean, Lisa Murphy, Amanda Brunker, Dáithí Ó Sé	N/A	N/A	2009-10-20
1	2	Brian Dowling, Noirin Kelly, Ben Clarke, Lorraine Tighe	N/A	N/A	2009-10-27
1	3	Kevin Kennedy, Cleo Rocos, Andrew Stanley, Mary McEvoy	N/A	N/A	2009-11-03
1	4	Linda Lusardi, Gerry Fish, Brendan O'Carroll, Pippa O'Connor	N/A	N/A	2009-11-10
1	5	Kevin Bloody Wilson, PJ Gallagher, Claire Tully	Captain Moonlight (performing Now Yer Hurling)	Jenny Talia (performing The Facebook Song)	2009-11-17
1	6	Rosanna Davison, Les McKeown, Samuel Preston	Ragaman Bob (performing Hole in me pocket)	Les McKeown (performing Bye Bye Baby)	2009-11-24
1	7	Kenny Egan, Michael Carruth, Tracey Cox, Rowland Rivron	Man in the Mirror (performing Billie Jean)	Buster Bloodvessel (performing Lip Up Fatty)	2009-12-01
1	8	Karl Spain, Breffny Morgan, Sarah Symonds	DJ Lee & P MC (performing A Song for Thierry Henri)	Veda (performing Stars Edge)	2009-12-08
1	9	Rich Fulcher, Sean Munsanje, Foster and Allen	Ri Ra (performing Front Bar)	Foster and Allen (performing Tom Jones' Delilah)	2009-12-08
1	10	Colm & Jim-Jim, Neil Hamilton, Christine Hamilton	The Rubberbandits (performing "Bag of Glue")	Gerry Fish (performing Run, Run Rudolph)	2009-12-23
1	11	Joe Duffy, Johnny Vegas, Jennie McAlpine	N/A	Katherine Lynch (performing I Will Survive)	2009-12-26

=== Podge and Rodge's Late Night Lock Inn (2009) ===
A Christmas Special billed as Podge and Rodge's Late Night Lock Inn was broadcast on RTÉ Two on 26 December 2009. Featuring guests Joe Duffy, Johnny Vegas, Jennie McAlpine aka. Fiz from Coronation Street and Irish comedian Katherine Lynch.
