= The Podge and Rodge Show =

Irish television series

- Promotional image with original presenter, Lucy Kennedy.
- Also known as: The Podge and Rodge Show with Lucy Kennedy (2006–2008)
- Genre: Talk show
- Created by: Ciaran Morrison; Mick O'Hara
- Developed by: Ciaran Morrison; Mick O'Hara
- Directed by: Simon Gibney
- Starring: Lucy Kennedy (2006–2008); Various presenters (2008–2009); Caroline Morahan (2008, 2009–2010); Doireann Garrihy (2018–2019); Podge; Rodge
- Country of origin: Ireland
- Original languages: English; Irish
- No. of series: 6
- No. of episodes: 174 inc. 1 spin-off (list of episodes)

Production
- Executive producer: Jim Jennings
- Production location: RTÉ Television Centre
- Camera setup: Multi-camera
- Running time: 22 minutes

Original release
- Network: RTÉ Two
- Release: 6 February 2006 – 24 December 2018

Related
- A Scare at Bedtime

The Podge and Rodge Show is a talk show, broadcast and produced by RTÉ. For the first three seasons Podge and Rodge were joined by Lucy Kennedy as a co-host but for the first half of the fourth season they were joined by guest hosts including Michelle Heaton, after Kennedy took insult to being called "every name under the sun from bisto to an ugly Gráinne Seoige". Following a mid-season hiatus, Caroline Morahan took on the role of permanent co-host in February 2009. The programme airs every Monday and Tuesday at 22:50 on RTÉ Two from February to April and from October to December with a hiatus during the summer months. The series came to an end on 27 April 2010, with Kennedy appearing as a guest on the final episode of the fifth series.

The show was relaunched in October 2018 with host Doireann Garrihy, but cancelled in March 2019.

== Setting ==
Set in Ballydung Manor, the brothers' home in the village of Ballydung in County Ring, as well as celebrity interviews of a humorous nature it also involved quizzes, reviews, news, music and talent contests, as well as racenights involving among other entities hamsters in mazes, sheep shearing and tractors. During early episodes, with the credits rolling, it was common for the two to tell viewers to direct their complaints elsewhere, e.g. RTÉ or The Joe Duffy Show. The programme's popularity was reflected on the Irish Singles Chart, as The Saw Doctors reached number one on 17 October 2008 with the song "About You Now", first performed on The Podge and Rodge Show as a dare during the "Rock N' Roulette" feature of series three.

== List of episodes ==
=== First series ===
While the pilot episode, An Audience with Podge and Rodge, was first broadcast on RTÉ on Saint Stephen's Day in 2005, the series did not begin in earnest until 6 February 2006.

A feature introduced in the first series was Rodge's Wrister Wreview. It involved various items, such as books, magazines and television shows receiving the expert opinion of Rodge. The items were rated on the Wrister Scale which was displayed on the screen.

Never to be accused of ignoring current affairs, the duo aired their views on the naked calendar craze that was sweeping the world and even did their bit to help out when Ireland was faced by fears of a bird-flu pandemic; they decided to 'kill' The Late Late Show owl. After spending much time taking aim, they eventually shot him to pieces. Also in current affairs they discussed the SSIAs, taking digs at Eddie Hobbs, Pat Kenny and The Late Late Show along the way.

=== Second series ===
The second series was broken into two halves, the first beginning on 16 October 2006 and running until 31 December 2006. After a break of one month the second series continued on 5 February 2007 and ran until 10 April 2007.

A feature that first appeared in this series was Ballydung Idol which featured spoofs of famous songs. When the performance had reached a sufficient level of "crapiness" a fart sound erupted to halt proceedings. The level of "crap" was measured on a Crapometer which Richie Kavanagh won with one minute and fifty-five seconds.

Winning Streak (a parody on the RTÉ produced gameshow of the same name) invited streakers to film their exploits and send them into the show with extra points being awarded for things such as more daylight and public streaking.

Miss Ballydung was a beauty contest of sorts; a cross between Miss World and The Rose of Tralee. It featured such beauties as Miss Muck, Miss Poledance Fitness and Miss Muff. Queen of the Land bottle-fed a lamb as Podge and Rodge made references to its imminent digestion by a hungry human. The final was held on the Monday 18 December 2006 episode, judged by Rose of Tralee Kathryn Anne Feeney, as well as that evening's guests, Brendan Bowyer and Des Bishop. The winner was Miss Poledance Fitness (from Newry).

Model Andrea Roche appeared on the show amidst media speculation on an interview she gave when she was competing in the Miss World competition in the Seychelles in 1997.

Podge and Rodge hosted a special show from Ballydung Manor on 19 December, entitled A Frightmare Before Christmas. It celebrated Christmas from their perspective, a reality where none of the intended guests turned up, and imaginary scenarios where the worst possible guests did. In reality Podge and Rodge and Lucy were left in the darkness of Ballydung Manor as the thunder raged outside, imagining their nightmare guests.

Podge and Rodge rang in 2007 on 31 December in a special programme lasting over forty minutes instead of the usual thirty-minute format. The New Year's Eve show was called Bogmanay (a play on Hogmanay). It was broadcast on RTÉ Two from 11:30 p.m. The boys dressed up for the occasion, presenting the show in white shirts, black jackets and bowties. The audience wore party hats.

The second series continued on 5 February 2007 after a hiatus of one month with a new feature Gifted or Afflicted and a new celebrity game; The Sheep Shagger Challenge in which Bernie the Sheep is ridden by a celebrity each week. Another new segment added was ShamRock, which has included tribute acts to some of the world's best known bands.

=== Third series ===
The famous Rock 'N' Roulette slot let to a #1 single for The Saw Doctors.

The third series began on 15 October 2007. A new feature will be "Ballydung's Grot Talent", which will see auditioning of freaks take place over nine weeks with judges Lucy Kennedy and Brendan Kilkenny travelling to almost 32 counties, beginning with Portlaoise (with guest judge Declan Nerney). Lucy Kennedy described it as "You're A Star gone wrong" on The Ray D'Arcy Show on Today FM on Wednesday 26 September.

After a hiatus following the Bogmanay New Year's Eve Special, the third series continued on 4 February 2008 twice weekly for a further ten weeks. The 100th episode was celebrated on 24 March 2008. Series three ended with two special programmes. A Jack Charlton Special on 14 April and on Tuesday 15 April the '2008 Golden Loggies Awards' which was a 'best of' show, featuring the best of the guests from the third series.

=== Fourth series ===
Each week of the series four of the guest presenters undergo a challenge set by Podge and Rodge.

The fourth series began on 20 October 2008. For the first time Lucy Kennedy does not feature as co-host. Instead each week a female celebrity will guest present until they find a replacement. Kicking off the series was Michelle Heaton who joined the Ballydung brothers for the first two shows. The second week saw Pamela Flood as guest presenter. Journalist and former Miss Ireland busty Amanda Brunker also presented the show. She teased the boys with her high cut dresses and bulging cleavage. Other guest presenters up until Christmas 2008 included Mary McEvoy a.k.a. Biddy from Glenroe, Donna and Joseph McCaul, Rosanna Davison, Bláthnaid Ní Chofaigh, Rebecca Loos, Caroline Morahan, Anna Nolan and Twink. After their usual mid-season break, the show returned on 9 February for a further twenty episodes with a new Lady of Ballydung Manor, Caroline Morahan. Podge (or Rodge) opened the show with the announcement that "It's the same oul’ shite", before introducing Morahan with a number of quips such as: "She was Off the Rails and now she’s off the dole queue", "A fully nationalised, index approved ride", "Lady Caroline of the Manor" and "Ireland’s answer to Angelina Jolie." The fourth season began on 20 October 2008 and ran until 14 April 2009, which turned out to be the final episode of the series as it was announced that a new format, Podge and Rodge's Stickit Inn, a celebrity pub quiz would replace the chat show in the Autumn 2009 schedule.

=== Fifth series ===
After the short-lived quiz show format of Podge and Rodge's Stickit Inn (see below), which reverted to a chat show mid-series, Podge and Rodge returned on 23 February 2010 for a ten-week run under the original title of The Podge and Rodge Show with brand new opening titles. The series was still filmed in the Stickit Inn pub set with a live audience and Johnny Dorgan the man with the organ remained as a recurring character. For the first time the show did not have a female co-host. The running time returned to the original 30-minute format but featured three celebrity guests and a music act per show. For the final episode of the fifth series the show pulled in a 20 per cent audience share.

=== Best of The Podge and Rodge Show ===
From 21 July 2009, RTÉ began showing a compilation of the best moments of the first three series of The Podge and Rodge Show. Ten half-hour episodes were produced and aired on RTÉ Two at 10:30 p.m. A further ten half-hour 'Best of' shows were broadcast from 8 June 2010 until 10 August 2010.

=== Sixth series ===
The Podge and Rodge Show returned on 22 October 2018 to the Ballydung Manor set and was filmed in front of a live studio audience with brand new co-host Doireann Garrihy. The series was cancelled in March 2019.

== Podge and Rodge's Stickit Inn ==
Podge and Rodge's Stickit Inn
- Genre: Comedic talk show
- Created by: Ciaran Morrison; Mick O'Hara
- Developed by: Ciaran Morrison; Mick O'Hara
- Starring: Virginia Macari; John Keogh; Podge; Rodge
- Country of origin: Ireland
- Original languages: English; Irish
- No. of series: 1
- No. of episodes: 11 (list of episodes)

Production
- Camera setup: Multi-camera
- Running time: 40 minutes

Original release
- Network: RTÉ Two
- Release: 20 October – 26 December 2009

Related
- A Scare at Bedtime

Podge and Rodge's Stickit Inn (also known as Podge and Rodge Stickit Inn) had a format originally based around the idea of a pub quiz, featuring two teams of celebrity guests competing for prizes such as a saddle of lamb, a hock of ham or a tin of biscuits. The first episode aired on 20 October 2009 but soon reverted to a chat/entertainment show similar to The Podge and Rodge Show. The series ran weekly until April 2010. The TV set was a 360 degree bar set and the audience were fully integrated into the fictional Stickit Inn bar. Joining Podge and Rodge was "Sicilian barmaid Gina", played by real-life Chip-Shop Mafia Moll, Virginia Macari. who is apparently on the run from the Casa Nostra and rumoured to know the exact size of Silvio Berlusconi's assets. Resident music maestro at The Stickit Inn was showband has-been Johnny Dorgan, thrown out of The Indians in 1978 for pissing in their Wig Wam. Johnny Dorgan was played by real-life ex showbander John Keogh of Full Circle fame. The show featured three to four guests who joined Podge and Rodge for a chat. Other features included musical performances into the ad break; 'Rapper in the Crapper' and a music guest performance at the end of the show.

On 24 November 2009, in what the show admitted was an "unlikely coup" for public interest, it broadcast for the first time on television in Ireland, the four controversial advertisements commissioned by employment agency FÁS, which cost the citizens €600,000 but were never previously aired. The programme's producers received the films under the Freedom of Information Act and managed to pip every other programme in the country, including the RTÉ News.

== Reception ==
The show was initially a ratings success, regularly getting over 400,000 viewers a show during the first season, including 440,000 for the week beginning 9 April 2006 and peaking at almost 450,000 (40 per cent of those watching television at this time) for the season finale on 2 May. At this time it tended to have more viewers than Desperate Housewives and Lost, both of which are also shown on RTÉ Two. It was also catching up on RTÉ's flagship chat show — The Late Late Show — which airs on Friday nights on RTÉ One, and has approximately half a million viewers. However, there was a drop in viewership in later seasons, but the show continues to be the top rated home produced show on RTÉ Two.

Following on from the success of their show, Podge and Rodge were asked to appear in several television advertisements for RTÉ which encouraged viewers to pay their television licences. They were also featured in a radio ad for Will Leahy's The Saturday Show on RTÉ 2fm, in which they described the show as better than "shit on a stick". Another spin-off saw them interviewing nemesis Pat Kenny for the People in Need Telethon whilst around the same time a book, The Ballydung Bible, was released.

== DVDs ==
| DVD name | Release date | Bonus material |
|---|---|---|
| The Podge & Rodge Show - The Best of Series One | 3 November 2006 | Unseen pilot interview with sports presenter George Hamilton, Even More Johnny Vegas, More Keith Duffy, Ainezone, Ballydung Weather with Martin King (weather presenter), Pole Dancing Competition. |
| The Podge & Rodge Show - The Cream of Series Two | 2 November 2007 | Miss Ballydung Pageant, Ballydung Idol, Sex Toy Show with Margo, A Load of Pointless Games, Photo album, Hidden Easter Eggs. |
| The Podge & Rodge Show - The Best of Series Three | 14 November 2008 | Jack Charlton half hour special Uncut, Rock N Roulette jukebox, Secret Bloopers tape. |
| The Podge & Rodge Show - The Best of Series Four | 6 November 2009 | Podge & Rodge's Family Album, The Ballydung Jukebox. DVD cover design by Jim Fitzpatrick |
| The Podge & Rodge Show - Poxy Box | 9 April 2010 | The set features all four previous 'Best of' DVDs in a collector's box set. |

== Award nominations ==
TV Now Awards

- 2006
  - Favourite Television Programme (win)
- 2007
  - Favourite Television Programme (win)
- 2008
  - Favourite Television Programme (NOMINATION)

IFTAs

- 2007
  - Best Entertainment Show (NOMINATION)
  - BSE/IFB & NIFTC Breakthrough Talent Award for Lucy Kennedy for her role as co-host (NOMINATION)
- 2008
  - Best Entertainment Show (win)
- 2009
  - Best Entertainment Show (NOMINATION)

Goss.ie - The Gossies

- 2019
  - Best TV Show (NOMINATION)
  - Best Female TV Presenter - Doireann Garrihy - 2019 (win)
