= List of A Scare at Bedtime episodes =

A Scare at Bedtime (also known as Podge and Rodge: A Scare at Bedtime) is an Irish adult comedy series which aired on late-night television on Network 2 (RTÉ2) starting in 1997. The series features the two puppets Podge and Rodge, who went on to have their own chat show. The duo are middle-aged farmers who live in "Ballydung Manor" in the Irish midlands and tell lewd jokes.

In each episode, Rodge arrives home and Podge insults him and proceeds to tell a ghost story acted out by live actors. The show won an Irish Film and Television Award for best entertainment programme. It ran for nine series, with a total of 150 episodes from 1997 until January 2006.

== Episodes ==
=== Series 1 (1997–98) ===
| No. | Title | Original release date | Prod. code |
|---|---|---|---|
| 1 | "The Quare Fella" | 24 November 1997 | 101 |
Damien Mc Arsagone boasts how he had often outwitted the Devil, but he soon shuts up after a dance with a mysterious cloven hoofed girl!
| 2 | "Hitch Hiker" | 1 December 1997 | 102 |
Podge and Rodge's cousin, Fintan O’Leprosy picks up a beautiful hitch-hiker only to be carjacked in the worst possible way.
| 3 | "Lazybones" | 8 December 1997 | 103 |
Irelands laziest bollix Henry’ The Sleeper’ Madden sleeps over in a spooky house and has a permanent lie-in!
| 4 | "The Cravings" | 15 December 1997 | 104 |
How long will poor Cormac McAnus resist the cravings for the other white meat?
| 5 | "Black Xmas" | 22 December 1997 | 105 |
After downing a crate of stolen Napoleonic brandy, the Fitznobs of Ballywank Manor have a killer hangover – literally!
| 6 | "Pulling Me Leg" | 29 December 1997 | 106 |
In 1880 Oliver Feeley from Two–Mile-Hole visits his sister up in Dublin, but after a case of mistaken identity he ends up another victim of the notorious street justice of Judge Breakneck.
| 7 | "Appendix" | 5 January 1998 | 107 |
A routine operation to remove his appendix turns into a nightmare for poor Donny Gussit, who loses more than he bargained for at the hands of an unscrupulous surgeon.
| 8 | "Sunbed" | 12 January 1998 | 108 |
Another terrible tale of caution as Fionnula Fitzgiblet takes one sunbed treatment too many and ends up a ‘fried-maid’ instead of bridesmaid!
| 9 | "Lover’s Peak" | 19 January 1998 | 109 |
In this classic urban myth young lusty lovers Jack Morples and Mary Stenkirt drive to the secluded Lover’s Peak, where instead of making-out they meet-their-maker!
| 10 | "Tractor of Doom" | 26 January 1998 | 110 |
When young man Toolin inherits his Father’s farmland, he tries to sell it. There are no takers as the locals warn that the field is sacred burial ground. Toolin laughs at their superstitious ways but that's before he has a run-in with The Tractor of Doom.
| 11 | "The Eggtimer" | 2 February 1998 | 111 |
Oxter McLaughlin treats his daughter Delores like a slave, she has to boil his eggs every day for exactly three minutes, no more, no less. But things reach boiling point when he discovers that Delores has fallen in love with a young librarian.
| 12 | "Brain Scooper" | 9 February 1998 | 112 |
The town of Butt Crack, West Virginia is home to The Finkle family, but Papa Finkle has very strange ideas on how to literally ‘feed knowledge’ to his only son Jeffery.
| 13 | "Waster" | 16 February 1998 | 113 |
Ruari O’Pluracy sits on his hairy hole day in, day out ever since his Father died whilst his Mother works to bone to put food on the table. And when his Mother passes away Ruari couldn't care less, that is until the priest comes to visit.
| 14 | "Vampire Leprechaun" | 23 February 1998 | 114 |
Never get involved with a married woman. Especially when she's the zombie bride of Irelands only Vampire Leprechaun Seamus Shenangan.
| 15 | "The Golden Arse" | 2 March 1998 | 115 |
Ireland’s very own Indiana Jones; Pronsious Ni Crotch sets off for the lost Inca village of Licky Bumbum in search of the legendary ‘Golden Arse.’ But he's in for a whole ‘pile’ of trouble once he moves the relic from its sacred site.
| 16 | "The Stud" | 9 March 1998 | 116 |
Pony Mahony is the ultimate ladies man, but when he sets his eyes on the new beauty in town who questions his masculinity he decides on some plastic surgery. After the operation he's even cockier than he was before!
| 17 | "Little Green Fella’s" | 16 March 1998 | 117 |
The 1965 the Earth’s doom was set by Finbar O’Pubicon who sold cow manure to a bunch of aliens who told him they needed the dung to grow plants on their dying planet, but they were planning on using it to fuel their battleships for an imminent invasion.
| 18 | "Clones" | 23 March 1998 | 118 |
Science Fiction meets science fact in this futuristic tale of a hapless clone RX-75 who constantly dreams of one day leaving the cloning facility and living in the real world.
| 19 | "Banshee" | 30 March 1998 | 119 |
Anal Boyle is haunted by the blood curdling wail of the banshee that signalled the death of both his parents and when it follows him back to New York he is determined to put an end to the curse once and for all.
| 20 | "Tropical Diseases" | 6 April 1998 | 120 |
Podge & Rodge’s alter-ego’s Fester & Ailin’ make their musical debut on Ballydung Radio with the video for their song about the dangerous of foreign travel.

=== Series 2 (1998–99) ===
| No. | Title | Original release date | Prod. code |
|---|---|---|---|
| 21 | "Carmel Sutra" | 7 September 1998 | 201 |
Lorcan Piles wins the Lottery and offers to buy his best friend Mossie McGoolican anything he wants. But when Mossie asks for a night with ‘Carmel Sutra’-the Mistress of Pleasure, Lorcan finds out the true meaning of friendship.
| 22 | "Holiday in Hell" | 14 September 1998 | 202 |
Mickey Scratcher decides to take one more holiday before joining the priesthood. He goes on a pilgrimage to the Far East, but the Holiday of a Life-time becomes a Holiday of a Death-time!
| 23 | "Hell House" | 21 September 1998 | 203 |
Ardle McArdle and his family buy Muff Cottage - the House of their dreams or as it turned out; the house of their Nightmares! And even when they move out, the haunted house won't leave them alone!
| 24 | "Diet Pill" | 28 September 1998 | 204 |
The classic tale of Willy Ring from Toolend. A man who had tried everything in the hope of shedding a few pounds. He purchases a miracle pill and takes the art of dieting to an all new low!
| 25 | "G.O.B" | 5 October 1998 | 205 |
Poor Johnny Ballsac is a ‘shitehawk’ or so his Dad always tells him. He's fed up and decides to make something of himself by joining a religious cult led by the charismatic Yogi Gob. The cult allows you to have five wives...but at what price?
| 26 | "Living Canvas" | 12 October 1998 | 206 |
Dick Dalton from Bognobber is addicted to body-art and on his third wedding anniversary he gets the most intimate piercing as a surprise for his like-minded wife. But has Dick got one piercing too many!
| 27 | "Bedsit" | 19 October 1998 | 207 |
Mary O’Hairy is desperate to escape her small town existence and in particular from her intense ex-boyfriend. So she is delighted when she and her friend Betty Bulbus get accepted into a Dublin college Unfortunately their further education is literally CUT short!
| 28 | "The Beast" | 26 October 1998 | 208 |
Tracing your family roots has never been so dangerous! Especially if you're a Mc Cracken and your ancestors are from the cursed hometown of the legendary Beast of Ballybollock!
| 29 | "Halloween" | 31 October 1998 | 209 |
Local boys done good Fester and Ailin’ strum out another of their No.1 tunes. Taken from their album ‘Fiddlin’ with the Monks’ it's their infamous Halloween hit ‘Never Shove a Banger up yer arse!’
| 30 | "Genie" | 2 November 1998 | 210 |
Fergal Scuttle discovers a mysterious bottle in his fishing net and after giving it a good polish, a beautiful Genie appears. She has been a prisoner in the bottle for a 1000 years and instead of ‘being careful what you wish for’ as Fergal finds out it's more important ‘how’ you wish for it!’
| 31 | "The Case" | 9 November 1998 | 211 |
Jock Rash tries to get away with murder with his wife’s corpse stowed away in a suitcase. But with the legendary Detective Spunk Murphy literally on his ‘case’ Jock finds himself on a train journey going nowhere very fast.
| 32 | "The Mole" | 16 November 1998 | 212 |
Gus 'The Mole' Gerahty is Ireland's premier safe cracker and jail breaker. When he's sent to the notorious Hole Island prison he plans his most audacious break-out to date. But will he get out alive or dead?
| 33 | "Nasty Habits" | 23 November 1998 | 213 |
The nuns of Bumboyle Abbey are notoriously competitive. But how far will they go to win the 'Oldest Nun of the Year' award when Sister Angina keels over dead the day before the Pope visits to present her with the coveted prize?
| 34 | "Phone Home" | 30 November 1998 | 214 |
Brad Fukofski from Methane, Michigan double crosses notorious mob boss Don Keyhole. Whilst fleeing the scene of the crime with the booty in hand, Brad receives a phonecall from his 'future self' warning him about events that lead to his arrest. But should he believe the mysterious caller?
| 35 | "Close, but no Cigar" | 7 December 1998 | 215 |
Catriona Eczema becomes obsessed with Madame Vargeena's prediction that she will become a millionaire. When she meets Benji Swillshank, Ireland's Cigar baron, she puts aside her revulsion of this putrid walrus for the cash prize. But at what price does the prize come?
| 36 | "The Break" | 14 December 1998 | 216 |
Turloch and Hannah Roids hadn't been on a holiday for five years. Turloch was getting a new business off the ground and Hannah was looking after her invalid Mother. When Mrs. Splatter, a kindly neighbour offers to look after Mother; it's an offer to great to miss!
| 37 | "Floater" | 21 December 1998 | 217 |
'Never date outside of your class' is a lesson that Shane Cyst from Squitters Bridge learns the hard way when he starts dating Milandra Potter Pugh and his nervous bowel lets him down or is that ‘brown?’
| 38 | "Christmas" | 25 December 1998 | 218 |
It's another miserable Christmas at Ballydung manor. Podge has bought himself a present, a new Alpine music album 'Fester and Ailin's Raging Horns' which features their latest single, the thoroughly festive 'There's a Dead Man up the Chimney'
| 39 | "Lonely Guy" | 28 December 1998 | 219 |
Dave Knuckleshuffle regularly goes on dates with Pam and her five sisters and when he visits the adult section in his local video shop he's intrigued by a video with his name on it!
| 40 | "Hair" | 4 January 1999 | 220 |
'Always read the instructions' is a lesson that Ozzie Dorgan learns the hard way when the vanity gets the better of him and he overdoses on hair tonic!

=== Series 3 (1999–2000) ===
| No. | Title | Original release date | Prod. code |
|---|---|---|---|
| 41 | "Plughole" | 4 October 1999 | 301 |
Enda Meeshank was studying genetic science and decided to do some extra curricular experiments in the bath of his flat. But the mixture of his very own genes from his bath and the chemicals he flushed away created a creature a little too ‘clone’ for comfort!
| 42 | "Backdoor Man" | 11 October 1999 | 302 |
Flush Lavatory and his wife Nuala had just moved into the new development at Godownonme Crescent and when he spied his sexy new neighbour Shiela Feelit. It wasn't long before he was popping round for a bit of ‘love thy neighbour’
| 43 | "Laptop" | 18 October 1999 | 303 |
Franky O’Friction was a travelling salesman, living from one hotel room to another. But with his trusty laptop he was never alone. However his passion for dirty Internet sites ended up affecting his ‘sight’!
| 44 | "Foreplay" | 25 October 1999 | 304 |
The game of golf takes a sinister twist as an unscrupulous land developer Jimmy Eastwood kicks Patch Keogh off his farm and creates the infamous Glengobble Golf course; where no–one ever makes it to the 18th hole...alive!
| 45 | "Second Coming" | 1 November 1999 | 305 |
Mad Dog McGuire’s vicious mutts were running riot around the neighbourhood and he couldn't care less. Until the day his dogs brought home the mauled corpse of his neighbour Pascal Wrench. But even then Mad Dog had a plan for the ultimate ‘stitch up’!
| 46 | "Porno Shop Song" | 8 November 1999 | 306 |
Ballydung Radio are proud to present Fester and Ailin’s latest chart topper celebrating ‘Screw U’ - Ireland’s First pornography shop. And even though the moral majority wanted it stopped, the people of Ireland stuck up their free hand and shouted ‘we don't want our Porno shop banned!’
| 47 | "The Black Brogues" | 15 November 1999 | 307 |
Seamus Mc Anus will do anything to become the Greatest Irish dancer in the world, by fair means or foul! And after he steals the perfect pair of dancing shoes his dream becomes a reality, but his short cut to fame isn't all that's ‘cut’ short!
| 48 | "The Man in the Aran Mask" | 22 November 1999 | 308 |
The infamous serial killer ‘The Man in the Aran Mask’ is shocked when a callous murderer is claiming to be him. He decides to lie low and hide his trademark mask until the killer is caught. But who is this mysterious copycat and where the hell did he leave his mask?
| 49 | "Potion" | 29 November 1999 | 309 |
Willy Shaven from Cross-Dress Pass had a face like a ‘slid in shite’ which was a bit of a problem when all he craved was love! But real love doesn't come in a bottle as Willy discovers to his horror when he uses more than the recommended dosage of love potion and his dream girl becomes a nightmare.
| 50 | "Love Triangle" | 6 December 1999 | 310 |
Banger Lang loved the ladies, so much so he had no qualms about having a number of wives on the go. When his third wife Vixen suggested a threesome he certainly didn't expect the two participants to be his other better-half’s, all wanting a piece of him!
| 51 | "Prison Song" | 13 December 1999 | 311 |
Ireland’s favourite pirate radio station is back on the airwaves once more with yet another chart topper from Fester and Ailin’ bringing hope to the inmates of Ireland “When you're locked away, you'll get cuddles all day and a pat on the bum from the warden!” That's right, you'll never be lonesome in prison!
| 52 | "Office Party" | 20 December 1999 | 312 |
After being fired Jenny Talia isn't in the mood to go to the ‘fancy dress office party’ But she eventually decides to surprise her boyfriend Rudie Member in the photocopying room for some photo-copulation.
| 53 | "Clamped" | 25 December 1999 | 313 |
Willy Rigid was Ireland’s most notorious clamper. He was loathed by everyone in the town of Dripping, Co. Laois and when he slapped a ticket on the Lord Mayors car, it was a clamp too far!
| 54 | "Mr.Meat" | 27 December 1999 | 314 |
Rival butchers Jimmy Ruddock and Liam Larson take the annual Mr.Meat competition very seriously. And when Liam is cheated out of the title, he doesn't ‘mince’ his words when it comes to revenge!
| 55 | "Splendercock" | 3 January 2000 | 315 |
Phillius Splendercock was a terrible magician, so he was quite surprised when a financier offered to back him, with the only clause being that when he became the ‘No.1 magician in the world’ he would come and work exclusively at his venue. But this contract had no ‘get out’ clause!
| 56 | "Face Off" | 10 January 2000 | 316 |
Neill Down of ‘Blow Me’ Industries had a tax bill from Hell! But he also had friends in high places. Inspector Bush arranged for Neill’s fake death and reconstructive surgery. He was to come back with a new identity and remarry his wife, but will she love the new look Neill?
| 57 | "Hunter" | 17 January 2000 | 317 |
Glen Dalok and his daughter were Ireland’s most famous Vampire Hunting team. But on a trip to the town of Bedwettin a routine culling gets a whole lot more complicated when Glen’s daughter gets bitten by the Vicars undead son.
| 58 | "Hand Luggage" | 24 January 2000 | 318 |
When you're on the most wanted list in the country and you want to travel abroad, how do you get through airport security? That's the problem the infamous ‘Banana’ had to solve. But with enough money and the help of a dodgy surgeon, this unarmed slippery character makes a getaway!
| 59 | "Tease" | 31 January 2000 | 319 |
College students Clodagh Svelt and her jock boyfriend Steve Frontal loved nothing more than teasing poor Pat McShaft who worked in his parents shop ‘The Friendly Bun’. But with one prank too many Pat plans a most deadly revenge.
| 60 | "Freak Show" | 7 February 2000 | 320 |
Every year when the Busby and McMahon Travelling Freak show arrived in Cocknorris, the three town bullies loved nothing more than making fun of the ‘freaks’, especially the two-headed boy. But sometimes two heads are better than one as the freaks eventually fight back!

=== Series 4 (2000–01) ===
| No. | Title | Original release date | Prod. code |
|---|---|---|---|
| 61 | "Colosto You, Colosto Me" | 9 October 2000 | 401 |
Podge & Rodge show off their musical side with a rap about waste management.
| 62 | "Blind Man’s Bluff" | 16 October 2000 | 402 |
A young Russian girl discovers that a good deed is not always a good idea.
| 63 | "Real TV" | 23 October 2000 | 403 |
A group of over-enthusiastic film students take a reality TV project too far. Special guest appearance: Charlie Bird
| 64 | "Doggy Style" | 30 October 2000 | 404 |
One man and his dog fall foul of a woman scorned!
| 65 | "Speed Trap" | 6 November 2000 | 405 |
Two Gardaí play a trick on a new recruit, but take it a step too far. Special guest stars: Neil Francis, Gary Halpin
| 66 | "Citric Acid Trip" | 13 November 2000 | 406 |
Cocky business boyo ‘Flush Tone’ tries to earn a bit on the inside with a very unappealing results!
| 67 | "Femme Brulé" | 20 November 2000 | 407 |
Ian Flate finds out why you should never dip your spoon into another man’s porridge. Even if the bowl is rubber.
| 68 | "Red Carnation" | 27 November 2000 | 408 |
Unlucky in love loser Archie Smelt, finally meets the woman of his dreams.
| 69 | "Room Service" | 4 December 2000 | 409 |
A romantic hotel break takes a sinister turn when room service gives Minty Mingler more than she bargained for.
| 70 | "Cock" | 11 December 2000 | 410 |
Fester n’ Ailin’ sing a cheery song about morning glory on the farm.
| 71 | "Black Spot" | 18 December 2000 | 411 |
A couple come across a car crash; but just how many survivors are there?
| 72 | "Not What the Doctor Ordered" | 1 January 2001 | 412 |
The story of Jizz Montclaire and how he took method acting too far. Special guest star: Stephen Rea
| 73 | "Love and Straw" | 8 January 2001 | 413 |
A lonely young girl finds solace in the arms of a scarecrow
| 74 | "Gail Force" | 15 January 2001 | 414 |
Gail Ring had a serious problem with gas. But a gasbag of a doctor only made things worse.
| 75 | "911" | 22 January 2001 | 415 |
Ben Sideways discovers the meaning of lost in translation when he hires a new au-pair. Special guest star: Des Bishop
| 76 | "Bargain Bride" | 29 January 2001 | 416 |
A bitter mother buys her daughter a cut-price dress with devastating results.
| 77 | "Duffy" | 5 February 2001 | 417 |
The unlikely love story of a vampire and a slayer. It's love at first bite!
| 78 | "The Ardagh Phallus" | 12 February 2001 | 418 |
An ancient relic with strange powers wreaks havoc.
| 79 | "Crystal Balls" | 19 February 2001 | 419 |
A football coach turns to a psychic for help, but doesn't quite know the score.
| 80 | "On The Sly" | 26 February 2001 | 420 |
Fester n’ Ailin are back with a warning about the perils of family affairs.

=== Series 5 (2001–02) ===
| No. | Title | Original release date | Prod. code |
|---|---|---|---|
| 81 | "Headhunters" | 1 October 2001 | 501 |
Detective Spunk Murphy, Limerick CID is back to solve a most unusual case. Will he spot the colourful clues or should that be cues?
| 82 | "Cops and Slobbers" | 8 October 2001 | 502 |
A couple of bumbling cops unwittingly mess up their own investigation.
| 83 | "Rubbers" | 15 October 2001 | 503 |
Rick Rag and his wife Lillette had the perfect marriage. Or so one of them thought.
| 84 | "Dick Rubbin’" | 22 October 2001 | 504 |
The tale of the infamous highwayman and panty thief.
| 85 | "Exam Pressure" | 29 October 2001 | 505 |
A college professor tries to outwit four cocky students.
| 86 | "Dog Gone" | 5 November 2001 | 506 |
A small town call in Spunk Murphy when the beloved pets start disappearing.
| 87 | "Monkey Do" | 12 November 2001 | 507 |
Fester n’ Ailin bring you a warning song about the dangers of monkeys taking over the Earth!
| 88 | "Gels" | 19 November 2001 | 508 |
When barbers go bad.
| 89 | "No-body" | 26 November 2001 | 509 |
America’s top lawyer Dan Blowman goes head to head with a young novice.
| 90 | "Model Wife" | 3 December 2001 | 510 |
Why a cemetery is never a good place to look for a date. Featuring: Yasmine Akram
| 91 | "Fatal Fad" | 10 December 2001 | 511 |
Have you ever thought a toy looked alive?
| 92 | "Drive" | 17 December 2001 | 512 |
Roger Pokeme is a sex addict and he doesn't believe that there is anything that can turn him off sex? But, he's about to find out, the ‘hard’ way!
| 93 | "Changing Rooms" | 24 December 2001 | 513 |
A dream holiday ends in a nightmare for Sitonme and Todd Langer.
| 94 | "Bike Lovers" | 31 December 2001 | 514 |
A case of mistaken identity and tragedy meet at high speed!
| 95 | "4 to 1" | 7 January 2002 | 515 |
Mary Thong answers an ad to be on televisions latest reality show with a twist. But how far can reality shows go? Mary’s about to find out.
| 96 | "I Dream of Murder" | 14 January 2002 | 516 |
A terrible premonition spells trouble for Bernie Hardman.
| 97 | "Furry Tale" | 21 January 2002 | 517 |
A man with a fetish for dressing up in furry costumes finds out what it's like to be a real animal.
| 98 | "R.I.P Mail" | 28 January 2002 | 518 |
The dangerous combination of e-mail and an evil boss.
| 99 | "Dead Ringer" | 4 February 2002 | 519 |
Jim Natter teaches his gobby wife a lesson the only way she'll understand.
| 100 | "Pants" | 11 February 2002 | 520 |
The unfortunate story of Marty Felchman, his dream date, and his dodgy bowels.

=== Series 6 (2003) ===
| No. | Title | Original release date | Prod. code |
|---|---|---|---|
| 101 | "Hell We Go Again" | 6 January 2003 | 601 |
An American prisoner of war wakes from an horrific dream to find reality not much different.
| 102 | "Second Sight" | 13 January 2003 | 602 |
An innocent man stumbles into a twisted trap set by an alluring young woman
| 103 | "Deadly Accurate" | 20 January 2003 | 603 |
Two assassins; Lance Cocksure and new assassin on the block ‘The Hawk’ battle it out for the coveting Golden bullet.
| 104 | "Neighborhood Crotch" | 27 January 2003 | 604 |
A small town is confounded as secret sex tapes featuring the townsfolk in their very own bedrooms are turning up in porn shops across the country. Who can help them solve this mysterious and frankly embarrassing conundrum? The one and only Detective Spunk Murphy of course.
| 105 | "Trailer Trash" | 3 February 2003 | 605 |
Two down-at-heel petty crooks plan the heist of their life when they plot to horse-nap the world famous Red Bum. They fully intend to give the horse back when the ransom is handed over; but things don't go according to plan.
| 106 | "Sleep Tight, Sleep Fright" | 10 February 2003 | 606 |
A young woman hopes that changing her lifestyle will rid her of a terrifying recurring nightmare; and it seems to work. But was it just a dream or a premonition of something entirely more sinister?
| 107 | "Upstairs, Downscares" | 17 February 2003 | 607 |
All Randolph Smythe wants is a girl to see past his wealth and love him for himself. When he meets Morwina Pisspot, he thinks he has found just that. And she swears to love him in sickness and in health.
| 108 | "Hells Spells" | 24 February 2003 | 608 |
Two misfit students - Eloise and Sebastian - spend their evenings terrorising their fellow students with a Ouija Board. Then one day, the tables are turned with fatal consequences.
| 109 | "Un-Fortune-Ate" | 3 March 2003 | 609 |
A rich widow - Lady Urinaroma - is conned by her two servants but proves to be far from an easy target.
| 110 | "Fourth Contact" | 10 March 2003 | 610 |
A lone astronaut finds himself stranded on a strange planet. Luckily, its inhabitants are friendly and only have the kindest of intentions – but what is their idea of ‘kind’??

=== Series 7 (2003–04) ===
| No. | Title | Original release date | Prod. code |
|---|---|---|---|
| 111 | "Vent" | 17 November 2003 | 701 |
A ventriloquist’s dummy with a life of its own decides he would be better off without his owner and plans to get rid of him. After all, no one would suspect a dummy and he could be free to live the life he'd always dreamed of. But he had overlooked one vital thing...
| 112 | "Con Air" | 24 November 2003 | 702 |
Meet Fintan – a man with a completely new take on the ‘mile high club’ – and one nobody will want to join!
| 113 | "Cheat the Parents" | 1 December 2003 | 703 |
Sabrina Swallows is devastated when her parents ban her from seeing her beloved boyfriend Tony. But just what will it take for her to realise that maybe they do know best?
| 114 | "Fur Love" | 8 December 2003 | 704 |
A woman tries to work out how to explain to her husband how she acquired the fur coat her lover bought her. She thinks she has a foolproof plan – but her husband has a few secrets of his own!
| 115 | "Painting by Murders" | 15 December 2003 | 705 |
A spate of mysterious copycat killings sees several art lovers brutally murdered in the modus operandi of executed serial killers The Gardaí are baffled and there's only one person who can solve this case - the one and only Detective Spunk Murphy.
| 116 | "Shelfish" | 22 December 2003 | 706 |
A fatal tale of fish, food poisoning and a woman with a plan.
| 117 | "Sleep Fright" | 29 December 2003 | 707 |
Mickey Joe Girth thinks he has easy. He's new in town and already has an easy job working the night shift at a local petrol station. Practically the only customer at night is the local sleepwalker Donnie – and sure he's no problem. But Mickey shouldn't have made assumptions.
| 118 | "Fado Homo" | 5 January 2004 | 708 |
The story of two Celtic knights who want to spend Celtic nights together.

=== Series 8 (2004–05) ===
| No. | Title | Original release date | Prod. code |
|---|---|---|---|
| 119 | "Raging Bullshit" | 6 September 2004 | 801 |
Finbar Fury is saved from a life behind bars by an apparently altruistic boxing coach. Colonel Saunders sees world class potential in Finbar, who he witnessed accidentally killing a man in a dark alleyway. But no sooner has the Colonel turned his protégé into Finbar “Fists of” Fury – a serious contender – than his true motives begin to emerge.
| 120 | "Mortal Embarrassment" | 13 September 2004 | 802 |
Fintan Felon is back with another foolproof scam. This time, he's got his sights on grieving widows. Checking the death notices on a daily basis, Fintan simply picks out the name of a recently deceased man and pays a visit to his wife with a box of ‘personal goods’ which he claims her late husband had ordered. After all, what widow is going to want the embarrassment of knowing her dear husband had been a regular customer of the infamous ‘House of Wank’? Nope, Fintan reckons they'll just pay up and shut up... Until he decides to call on the recently bereaved wife of Crispin Murdoch.
| 121 | "Last Man Standing" | 20 September 2004 | 803 |
Ronnie Black was definitely the smoothest criminal around. With several robberies under his belt, not a single soul had ever been hurt and he was a major hit with the ladies. However, his luck is about to change and it looks like Black may no longer be the smoothest robber in the world – he may be the ONLY one,
| 122 | "Bee-otch" | 27 September 2004 | 804 |
Danny Veckins was a decent man - a good boss and a good father. But when his business and livelihood was threatened by a bitchy jobsworth in the financial institution where he had his business loan, he decides to take the law into his own hands.
| 123 | "Touching the Cloth" | 4 October 2004 | 805 |
Steve and Jimmy loved adventure sports. Unfortunately, they didn't always want to bother their arses actually mastering the sport in question. So far, they've been lucky. But what will happen when the two inexperienced climbers try and scale the dizzy heights of the legendary Mount Punani?
| 124 | "Randy Peak" | 11 October 2004 | 806 |
Detective Spunk Murphy is back in action on his most baffling case to date. A young couple are pushed to their death over Randy Peak whilst ‘in flagrante’ in their car. There are no clues – except an unmatchable set of fingerprints and a very similar crime committed over 50 years ago.... Could they be connected?
| 125 | "Old Aquiltance" | 18 October 2004 | 807 |
Iva Brownstain was a survivor. And 40 years after her heroic escape from a World War 2 camp, she was still around to prove it. In fact, things were good for Iva, and her local town were honouring her bravery at the unveiling of a new memorial. But who is the mysterious old acquaintance trying to track her down? And why is Rodge cut out of all the family photos??
| 126 | "Dead Spread" | 25 October 2004 | 808 |
Larry and Chloe Mingus had achieved every young couple’s dream and bought their first house. Sure, it needed a bit of work, but it was theirs and it felt like home. Unfortunately, as Chloe soon finds out, it feels like someone else’s home too.
| 127 | "Freezer Geezer" | 1 November 2004 | 809 |
Japs Eye, Bulb and Muppet really were ‘the lads’. They’d worked together for years and were always playing some prank or another on each other. But canny Japs Eye was the King of the Practical Joke, and always managed to get one up on the other two. Bulb and Muppet were determined to get one up on the funny man and one night, after a heavy night’s boozing, that's exactly what they do....
| 128 | "Face 2 Face" | 8 November 2004 | 810 |
Niamh had just embarked on a psychology degree at the Friendly University Kilkenny and although she was a quiet girl, was really looking forward to college life. She moved into a house with 3 other students and they all seemed to be getting along great; until some mysterious texts from an unknown man threaten to ruin everything. Who is Alan and how does he know so much about her??
| 129 | "Instaine" | 15 November 2004 | 811 |
Sarah Spreadem had just found the perfect flat. Within walking distance of work, decent rent and a very nice landlord. But one day Sarah sees a large stain on the carpet that she was certain hadn't been there before. When it resists scrubbing, she calls the landlord. However, no sooner has he walked in the door and the stain disappears! Just what is going on with Sarah’s underlay?
| 130 | "Triple X Christmas" | 24 December 2004 | 812 |
Join everyone’s favourite local boys done good – Fester and Ailin’ – as they celebrate Christmas in their own inimitable way. There are turkeys to be stuffed, stockings to be filled, sacks to be emptied and some lovely Santa’s little helpers to be sat on your knee and kissed under the mistletoe. This year, everyone’s guaranteed to have an XXXmas with a little help from Ballydung’s finest!
| 131 | "Dead Money" | 3 January 2005 | 813 |
The sordid story of Boyle and McSorley – two graverobbers who turn to murder when their source of dead bodies runs dry. Sure who will miss a few lonely drunks? At least that's what the murderous pair think as they trawl the bars of 18th century Dublin looking for their unsuspecting drunken prey. It seems too easy. The eminent surgeon Dr Carson, was prepared to buy as many bodies as they could ‘dig up’, until one day the tides are turned when Dr Carson finds out what is really going on. Just what gave the game away??
| 132 | "Mad About You" | 10 January 2005 | 814 |
Dr Pay is just an ordinary psychiatrist who can tell a loony from a mile off. So when he meets the elegant and refined Mrs Imelda Mounthaven, a woman in his care, he is alarmed to find that she really isn't mad at all. He is so convinced of the truth of her story of wrongful incarceration by her cruel husband, that he is prepared to lay his job on the line and help get her out. But will Dr Pay and Imelda live happily ever after, or is he letting his heart rule his psychiatrist’s head?
| 133 | "Nu U" | 24 January 2005 | 815 |
It didn't matter what way you looked at it, Eta Burger was a fattie. And the poor chunkster had tried no end of diets and fads, potions and shakes but to no avail. So when one day, whilst mashing her computer keyboard with her fat fingers, she came across an ad for the “Nu U Noodle” ultimate weight loss programme; she simply had to sign up. And lo and behold, it worked. Eta finally had the body she had always wanted; the only problem was, the people at Nu U wanted it as well.
| 134 | "Dead Man Talking" | 31 January 2005 | 816 |
Jockster Casey liked to think of himself as a bit of a wide boy. In reality, he was a relic of a bygone era of gangsters and ganglands. But the folk in his local - ‘The Bloody Stool’ - just let him get on with it, and he would regale his tales of the Docker Gang and the dirty deeds they used to get up to, to anyone who would listen. But Jockster was prone to a touch of exaggeration...what harm could an old man’s lies do? You'd be surprised.

=== Series 9 (2005–06) ===
| No. | Title | Original release date | Prod. code |
|---|---|---|---|
| 135 | "Lottery Forgottery" | 5 September 2005 | 901 |
It was Dick Fitzwell’s turn to buy the lottery ticket for his colleagues' syndicate. They had played for years, but never won more than a few Euro. So when all the numbers come up, they are ecstatic...until they discover that Dick hadn't bought the ticket...
| 136 | "Taxi" | 12 September 2005 | 902 |
Willie Palmer was the worst kind of taxi driver. He had a filthy car and a filthy mouth and took people for a ride – and not the one they had asked for. He would wait for an unsuspecting tourist and then take them on ‘the scenic route’ to crank up the fare. Until one day, Willie picked up more than he bargained for. Special guest star: PJ Gallagher
| 137 | "Flier" | 19 September 2005 | 903 |
Aspiring news reporter Jack Goff was ambitious to a fault. He would do anything to break a big story. So when someone appears to be leaving him clues to the identity of a serial killer, Jack forgets logic and jumps in headfirst. But he hadn't bargained on the Red Devil being even more ambitious than him.
| 138 | "Dead Funny" | 26 September 2005 | 904 |
Aspiring comedian Buster Cherry had one problem; he wasn't remotely funny. So when the chance arose for him to become the funniest man alive, he jumped at it - even if it meant selling his soul.
| 139 | "Buzzin Buddy" | 3 October 2005 | 905 |
Pat McCann enjoyed hanging out with his drinking buddies, but some days, he just wanted time to himself. So one day he does just that - spends the day treating himself to a day of retail therapy. But when he bumps into his boozing mates and is duly dragged for a pint, he hides his purchases safely in the gents to avoid a slagging from his mates. Little did poor Pat know, he was about to get a slagging from the whole country.
| 140 | "Caress Me Father" | 10 October 2005 | 906 |
Father Roger Rightly was a devout man of the cloth. So when Bishop Pullit came to visit the parish, Father Roger was appalled by his insinuation that anything untoward may be going on between the young priest and his attractive housekeeper. But is the bishop convinced by Father Roger’s insistence?
| 141 | "Truth Or Dare" | 17 October 2005 | 907 |
Rod Footlong was the worst kind of lothario. His “hump ‘em, dump ‘em” attitude to women had left him with a little black book like a phone directory. But despite the number of ladies he had left in his wake, his past never came back to haunt him. Until Rod is invited to take part in a new gameshow.
| 142 | "Throwing in the Towel" | 24 October 2005 | 908 |
It is never easy to move to a new neighbourhood, as Tammy Paxman and her daughter found out when they moved to the suburbs. Tammy was determined to do her daughter proud at her new school and impress the other mums at the same time, by baking an impressive cake for the school fair. But poor Tammy was no chef, and her best efforts came to nothing. She was about to throw in the towel when she had a great idea.
| 143 | "Will Feral" | 31 October 2005 | 909 |
Professor Manville was the world's leading anthropologist. He had devoted his life to the study of the history of mankind. So when the Professor heard word of the sighting of a primitive man, untouched by civilisation, he thought his life's work had all been worthwhile. He and his assistant Penny head to the Andes in search of this feral man and find the missing link they had both been looking for.
| 144 | "Star Struck" | 7 November 2005 | 910 |
Gerry Ryan - aka Ireland’s favourite radio and chat show host – was enjoying a quiet drink after work in his local when a young man approached him and asked for an autograph. Gerry, always being one to oblige a fan, agreed and the two began chatting. Then Jack broke down and explained that things were not great for him at the moment, but maybe the king of the airwaves could help him out? Special guest star: Gerry Ryan
| 145 | "Send and Deceive" | 21 November 2005 | 911 |
The Shadow Man was a criminal with a difference. His weapon of choice was technology. He would send out hundreds of random e-mails to individuals at company addresses, and wait to see which ones would bounce back with an out of office reply. Once he had the name of someone who was abroad for a while, he would find out where they lived, and their home would be his for as long as they were gone. The perfect crime and no one would get hut. Or so the Shadow man thought.
| 146 | "Two Timer" | 28 November 2005 | 912 |
Bridget Flea was a lonely soul. So when she met Bob, a charming man whom she passed on his way to work in the orchards every morning she thought fate had at last shone on her. Until that is, she met Bob one afternoon and he claimed not to know her. But Bridget couldn't let this chance at happiness go, so she followed Bob home to challenge him
| 147 | "Funny Business" | 5 December 2005 | 913 |
Busy corporate suit Chris P. Bacon had no time for anything but his high-flying career. Even his young son didn't get much of a look in. One day, Chris gets an attack of guilt and decides to take his son to the circus. But as soon as the show is over, Chris wants to get straight back to his executive life. But strange things start happening and Chris’ life will never be the same again.
| 148 | "Deatharazzi" | 12 December 2005 | 914 |
One of Ireland’s busiest photographers Shay Cheese wanted something more significant to snap. He was growing tired of chasing ambulances and dreamed of taking that one shot that would make him his fortune. Then one day, whilst looking through his portfolio, he spotted a recurring image that might grant him his wish.
| 149 | "Something About Mary" | 15 December 2005 | 915 |
What is it about the Irish people and presidents called Mary? We’ve had two in a row now, and local boys done good, Fester n’ Ailin, think it's time we had a man back in power. So sing along with them as they relay the pros and pros of having a man in the Aras!
| 150 | "Faking the Law" | 9 January 2006 | 916 |
Craven Morehead was a rich man - but like many wealthy people, he didn't like being parted from his money. He had everything he wanted in life, except for a happy marriage. But Craven was too tight to pay for a divorce. So when his lawyer rang him with a plan to get out of the marriage without getting out his wallet, it all seemed too good to be true.
