= Nasty Habits =

Nasty Habits may refer to:

== Film and television ==
- Nasty Habits (film), 1977 film; Glenda Jackson, Melina Mercouri, Geraldine Page and Sandy Dennis
- "Nasty Habits" (Once Upon a Time)
- "Nasty Habits", a 1998 episode of A Scare at Bedtime
- "Nasty Habits", a 1987 episode of Growing Pains
- Nasty Habits, truck in Mud bogging

== Music ==
- Nasty Habits, an alias of Doc Scott
- "Nasty Habits", a song by Oingo Boingo from the album Only a Lad
