= The Selection Box =

- Directed by: Brian Reddin, Brian Graham
- Judges: Brenda O'Donoghue
- Country of origin: Ireland
- No. of seasons: 1
- No. of episodes: 7

Production
- Running time: 60 minutes (45 minutes without commercials)

Original release
- Network: N2
- Release: 2003 – 2003

Related
- The Fame Game; Total Xposure

The Selection Box is a talent search reality TV show produced by Adare Productions for RTÉ. It was developed along with the Commissioning Editor of RTE Entertainment Billy McGrath and directed by Brian Reddin and Brian Graham. It was broadcast on Network 2 (now RTÉ Two) in 2001. It was produced to find a new presenter for a new Network 2 show called The Fame Game.

Caroline Morahan was the eventual winner who went on to present The Fame Game, while in 2007 the runner up, Karen Koster, began working on TV3's Xposé.

The Selection Box hosted an open audition in the RDS in 2001 in the search of a new TV presenter. A selection of these would-be presenters would then be sent on to a judging panel who would then bring them on to bootcamp.

2001 saw a wide range of reality TV shows in production. This was RTÉ's second talent search show having produced Popstars one year earlier. It had had success with its other reality task-based TV show Treasure Island which was filmed in New Zealand. This series was also commissioned by Billy McGrath who departed RTE in September 2002.

== Judges ==
Brenda O'Donoghue was the main judge.
