= Simon Atkins =

Simon Atkins may refer to:

- Simon Atkins (footballer) (born 1968), Australian rules football player
- Simon Atkins (basketball) (born 1988), Filipino basketball player
- Simon Atkins, runner up in the Irish reality television show Total Xposure
- Simon Green Atkins (1863–1934), North Carolina educator
