= The Fame Game =

Irish television programme

The Fame Game is a television programme broadcast in Ireland on RTÉ Two. It ran for four seasons from 2001 to 2005, and was presented by Caroline Morahan. She was selected to present the show from an open audition at the Royal Dublin Society in the reality TV series The Selection Box. After being presented with the contract to host The Fame Game, Morahan had only two weeks to prepare for that role. The premise of the show was that starstruck celebrity-worshipping fans were sent, usually to exotic locations, to track down their idols. It was produced by Adare Productions, they had had similar success with a weekly item on their TG4 series RíRá, where the fans tried to get the celebrities to speak a cúpla focal as Gaeilge (a few words in Irish).
