= 2007 Meteor Awards =

Irish music awards ceremony

- Meteor Awards 2007 logo
- Date: 1 February 2007
- Location: Point Theatre
- Hosted by: Podge and Rodge with Deirdre O'Kane
- Website: meteormusicawards.meteor.ie/index.aspx

Television/radio coverage
- Network: RTÉ Two

The 2007 Meteor Music Awards ceremony was held in the Point Theatre, Dublin on Thursday, 1 February 2007. It was the seventh edition of Ireland's national music awards and the last to be held at the Point before it shut for redevelopment. The event was presented by television personalities Podge and Rodge and comedian Deirdre O'Kane, who donned a showgirl outfit to open the awards ceremony. It was later broadcast on RTÉ Two on Sunday, 4 February at 21:00.

== Performances ==
There were performances on the night from Westlife with Ronan Keating, "The Dance", Kaiser Chiefs (who were first on stage), Director, The Pussycat Dolls, Amy Winehouse, The Feeling, The Blizzards and The Immediate.

Act	Performance title
Kaiser Chiefs	"Ruby"
Westlife feat. Ronan Keating	"The Dance"
Director	"Reconnect"
Pussycat Dolls	
Amy Winehouse	"Rehab"
The Feeling	
The Blizzards	"Fantasy"
The Immediate	"A Ghost in This House"

== Winners ==
Irish Act	Recipient	Nominees
Best Irish Band	Snow Patrol	
Best Irish Female	Luan Parle	
Best Irish Male	Damien Dempsey	
Best Irish Newcomer	Director	
Best Irish Fork/Traditional Act	Sharon Shannon	
Best Irish Pop Act	Westlife	
Best Irish DJ	Ray D'Arcy	
Best Irish Live Performance	Snow Patrol	
Best Irish Album	Eyes Open by Snow Patrol	
Most Download Song	"Chasing Cars" by Snow Patrol	
Hope for 2007	Royseven	
Humanitarian Award	Paul Brady	
Industry Award	Larry Gogan	
Lifetime Achievement Award	Clannad	

International Act	Recipient	Nominees
Best International Male	Justin Timberlake	
Best International Female	Lily Allen	
Best International Band	Scissor Sisters	
Best International Album	Whatever People Say I Am, That's What I'm Not by Arctic Monkeys	
