= Biddy =

Biddy or Biddie is a given name which may refer to:

== People ==
- Biddy Anderson (1874–1926), South African cricketer
- Biddy Baxter (1933–2025), English television producer
- Biddy Dolan (1881–1950), American Major League Baseball player
- Biddy Early (c. 1798 – 1874), Irish traditional healer
- Biddy Hodson, stage name of Bridget Hodson, British actress
- Gertrude Macdonald or Biddy Jamieson (1871–1952), English painter
- Carolyn Martin (born 1951), nicknamed "Biddy", president of Amherst College
- Biddy Mason (1818–1891), African American nurse, entrepreneur, and philanthropist
- Biddy Rockman Napaljarri (born c. 1940), indigenous Australian artist
- Biddy O'Sullivan, Irish former camogie player
- Biddy White Lennon (1946–2017), Irish actress and food writer

== Fictional characters ==
- Biddy, in the novel Great Expectations by Charles Dickens
- Biddy Paget, in the crime novel Mystery Mile by Margery Allingham
- Biddy Byrne, a protagonist in Glenroe, an Irish television drama
- Biddie Cloom, in Here Come the Brides, an American television series
- Biddy Mulligan, played by Jimmy O'Dea, an Irish actor and comedian
- Biddy, in the film Biddy (1983) by Christine Edzard
- Biddy Blas, in the video game Star Wars: Galactic Racer

== Sports ==
- Biddy Basketball a type of basketball games played by youth

== See also ==
- Bridget (given name), of which Biddy is a contraction
- Biddie (steamboat) – see Steamboats on Lake Coeur d'Alene
- Acaena novae-zelandiae or biddy-biddy, an ornamental plant
- Silver biddy, a fish
