= Sonya Lennon =

Irish fashion stylist, television presenter, business woman

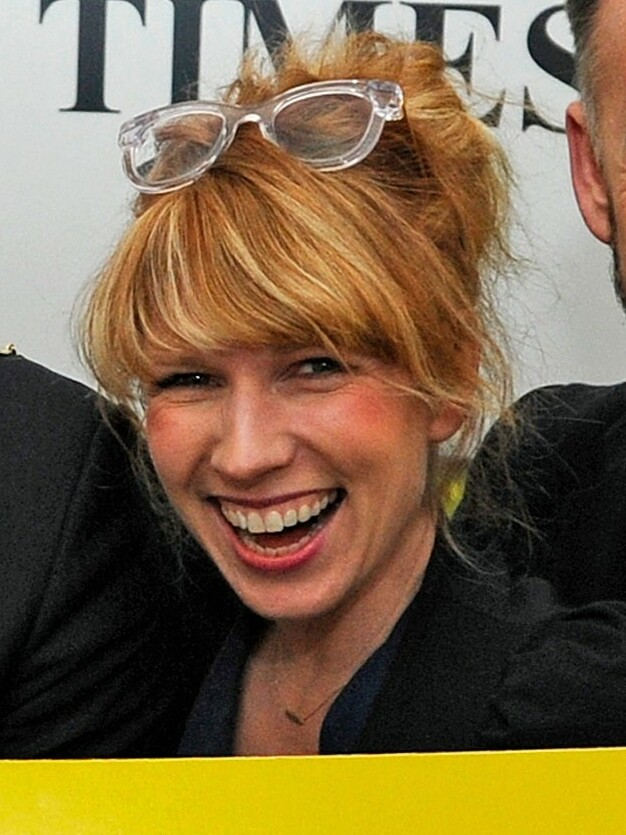
- Lennon in 2013
- Born: Sonya Lennon; 1969 (age 56–57)
- Notable work: Lennon Courtney; Off the Rails
- Partner: Dave

Sonya Lennon (born 1969) is an Irish fashion stylist, television presenter, co-founder of fashion brand Lennon Courtney and founder of the initiative Dress for Success in Ireland.

== Career ==
Sonya Lennon is a Dublin born stylist who has worked in the fashion industry for over thirty years. Educated through the Loreto College, St Stephen's Green and a course in communications at Coláiste Dhúlaigh College of Further Education, Lennon traveled before finally taking a public relations course in Rathmines. She has been a tv presenter, as of Autumn 2008, she was co-hosting RTÉ One's Off the Rails with Brendan Courtney. They went on to create a brand together called Lennon Courtney which sold in Dunnes Stores. Lennon also founded Dress for Success and in 2012 as a result she was awarded the Arthur Guinness Fund Award. Lennon is working with Leading Ireland’s Future Together(LiFT). Lennon is back on Irish TV with Strictly Business. With her partner Dave she has twins, a boy and a girl.
