= The Bronx Bunny Show =

Irish ten-part television series

- Created by: Ciaran Morrison; Mick O'Hara
- Developed by: Ciaran Morrison; Mick O'Hara
- Starring: Ciaran Morrison (Teddy T); Mick O'Hara (Bronx Bunny)
- Country of origin: Ireland
- Original language: English
- No. of episodes: 20

Production
- Executive producers: Ronan McCabe; Chuck LaBella
- Running time: 24 mins (Channel 4); ~15 mins (Starz)

Original release
- Network: Channel 4
- Release: November 24, 2003 – February 22, 2004
- Network: Starz
- Release: April 18 – June 20, 2007

The Bronx Bunny Show is an Irish ten-part television series originally broadcast in 2003 on E4 in the United Kingdom and later in Ireland. It was an adult puppet interview show that followed the premise of a semi-educational show for the good people of the Bronx, Queens and Manhattan. The show was produced from a run-down tenement building in the Bronx, where Bronx Bunny and his sidekick, a cigarette-smoking panda named Teddy T, would interview celebrities who "done good". The Bronx Bunny Show won the IFTA Award for Best Entertainment Programme in 2004.

Also featured on the show were pseudo-educational items, such as "The Internal Gerbil", who sang songs about internal organs from inside a gay man, numbers illustrated by pole-dancing women who contorted into the shape of that week's number, and Spanish phrases such as "Your mother bangs like a screen door in a tornado" allegedly voiced by Maïa Dunphy.

The show was broadcast sporadically on E4 and eventually on Channel 4. The series gained a cult following as it featured interviews with guests such as Hugh Hefner, Jessica Alba, William Shatner, and Larry Flynt. The show was created by Double Z Enterprises, an Irish production company behind such characters as Zig and Zag and Podge and Rodge.

In 2010, the entire Channel 4 season was made available to view on the 4oD site.

== Season one U.K. (2003) ==
S#	Ep#	Guests	Original airdate
1	1	Steve-O, Jessica Alba, Dr. Lier, Ming-Na Wen	2003-11-24
1	2	Victoria Silvstedt, Engelbert Humperdinck, Hugh Hefner, Judy Reyes	2003-11-23
1	3	Michael Madsen, Lynda Carter, Ross Jeffries, Sarah Wynter	2003-11-26
1	4	Steve Schirripa, Miss Vera, Bryan Cranston	2003-12-01
1	5	Nina Mercedez, Denis Hope, Richard Schiff, Ron Jeremy	2003-12-02
1	6	John Lydon, Sunrise Adams, John C. McGinley	2003-12-03
1	7	Dick Valentine, Marina Sirtis, Stone Cold Steve Austin, Larry Flynt	2003-12-22
1	8	Seymore Butts, Dr. Laurie Leach, William Shatner, Macy Gray	2003-12-23
1	9	"Best of" show, including Jason Isaacs, JC Chasez, and Federico Castelluccio	2004-02-21
1	10	More "best of", including Adam West and Shannon Elizabeth	2004-02-22

== Season one U.S. (2007) ==
A ten-part series was commissioned by Starz Entertainment and broadcast from 18 April 2007. Guests included Mark Hamill, George Takei, Kelly Carlson, Howie Mandel, Tommy Chong, Beverly D'Angelo, Joely Fisher, Ron Jeremy, Michael Rapaport, Tina Majorino, Jason Acuña, Method Man, and Eric Roberts. Saved by the Bell star Dustin Diamond played a recurring role as Bronx Bunny's neighbor, who dropped by unannounced and stole items from the apartment.

Other features included:

- Teddy T's "Bear Butts" porno series, which featured a number of genuine adult stars, such as Asian porn star Mika Tan.
- Musical numbers performed by Bronx Bunny on piano and Teddy T on vocals under the name "The Teddy Trio".

S#	Ep#	Guests	Original airdate
1	1	Steve Schirripa, Kelly Carlson	2007-04-18
1	2	Michael Rapaport, George Takei	2007-04-25
1	3	Chris Jericho, Mark Hamill	2007-05-02
1	4	Method Man, Tina Majorino, Dustin Diamond	2007-05-09
1	5	Harland Williams, Tommy Chong	2007-05-16
1	6	Howie Mandel, Stacy Keibler, Wink Martindale	2007-05-23
1	7	Eric Roberts, Robin Leach	2007-05-30
1	8	Richard Schiff, Jolene Blalock	2007-06-06
1	9	Joely Fisher, Jason Acuña	2007-06-13
1	10	Beverly D'Angelo, Ron Jeremy	2007-06-20

== Further TV appearances ==
Bronx Bunny and Teddy T went on to host two specials, The Top 20 Most Controversial TV Moments and Sex Stars They Tried to Ban, for Channel 4. They also appeared as guests on the NBC show Last Comic Standing on 19 September 2007.

== Awards ==
Irish Film & Television Academy Awards:

- Best Entertainment Programme – 2004
