= Celebrity Apprentice Ireland =

Irish reality television series

- Genre: Reality television series
- Country of origin: Ireland
- Original language: English
- No. of series: 1
- No. of episodes: 6

Production
- Running time: 80–minute episodes

Original release
- Network: TV3
- Release: 23 September – 28 October 2013

Related
- The Apprentice

Celebrity Apprentice Ireland is an Irish reality television series, in which a group of Irish celebrities compete for the chance to win €25,000 for their chosen charity.

Caroline Downey, the managing director of MCD is the head judge in the competition with the two advisors being former politician Liz O'Donnell and entrepreneur John McGuire.

Edele Lynch beat Amanda Brunker in the final which aired on 28 October 2013. Caroline Downey awarding Lynch the title after her team's renovation challenge in a Down Syndrome Ireland Latch On educational centre, using items sourced from donedeal.ie.

== Contestants ==
Candidate data
Celebrity	Background	Original Team	Result
Edele Lynch	Singer from B*Witched	Athena	The Celebrity Apprentice
Amanda Brunker	Gossip columnist	Athena	Fired in the Season Finale
Frances Black	Singer	Athena	Fired in week 6 (28/10/2013)
Daniella Moyles	Model and Presenter	Athena	Fired in week 6 (28/10/2013)
Mikey Graham	Boyzone member	Iconic	Fired in week 5 (21/10/2013)
Nick Leeson	Rogue Trader who caused Barings Bank to collapse	Iconic	Fired in week 4 (14/10/2013)
Maclean Burke	Fair City actor	Iconic	Fired in week 3 (07/10/2013)
Michael Conlan	Olympic bronze medal winning boxer	Iconic	Fired in week 3 (07/10/2013)
Emma Quinlan	Model and Burlesque performer	Athena	Fired in week 2 (30/09/2013)
Martin Moloney	Hardy Bucks member	Iconic	Fired in week 1 (23/09/2013)

== Summary ==
The first episode aired on TV3 on 23 September 2013. Martin Maloney of Hardy Bucks was the first celebrity to be sacked on the first show. The first task involved designing and selling custom-made T-shirts in high street store Penneys. The task was won by the girls team.

Emma Quinlan was the second celebrity to be fired after the second episode which aired on 30 September. Both teams were challenged with rolling out a themed event for Carling lager with Quinlan's team winning the public vote for the best entertainment event. However bosses at Carlsberg overturned the vote and claimed that they had missed the brief in that their event could not be rolled out to pubs nationwide. Nick Leeson and Edele Lynch were also brought back into the boardroom before Quinlan was fired.

Candidate	Original team	Week 2 team	Week 3 team	Week 4 team	Week 5 team	Application result	Record as Project Manager
Edele Lynch	Athena	Iconic	Athena	Athena	Iconic	The Celebrity Apprentice	1-0 (win in week 4)
Amanda Brunker	Athena	Athena	Iconic	Iconic	Iconic	Fired in season finale	2-0 (win in weeks 2 & 5)
Frances Black	Athena	Athena	Iconic	Iconic	Iconic	Fired in week 6	1-0 (win in week 3)
Daniella Moyles	Athena	Athena	Athena	Athena	Athena	Fired in week 6	1-0 (win in week 1)
Mikey Graham	Iconic	Iconic	Iconic	Athena	Athena	Fired in week 5	0-2 (loss in weeks 1 & 5)
Nick Leeson	Iconic	Iconic	Iconic	Iconic		Fired in week 4	0-1 (loss in week 4)
Maclean Burke	Iconic	Athena	Athena			Fired in week 3	0-1 (loss in week 3)
Michael Conlan	Iconic	Athena	Athena			Fired in week 3	
Emma Quinlan	Athena	Iconic				Fired in week 2	0-1 (loss in week 2)
Martin Moloney	Iconic					Fired in week 1	

No.	Candidate	Elimination chart					
No.	Candidate	1	2	3	4	5	6
1	Edele	IN	BR	BR	WIN	IN	CA
2	Amanda	IN	WIN	IN	BR	WIN	FIRED
3	Frances	IN	IN	WIN	BR	IN	FIRED
4	Daniella	WIN	IN	BR	IN	BR	FIRED
5	Mikey	LOSE	IN	IN	IN	FIRED	
6	Nick	BR	BR	IN	FIRED		
7	Maclean	IN	IN	FIRED			
8	Michael	IN	IN	FIRED			
9	Emma	IN	FIRED				
10	Martin	FIRED					

On the losing team
Won as project manager on his/her team
Lost as project manager on his/her team
Was brought to the final boardroom
Was fired
Lost as project manager and was fired
Did not participate in the task
Winner of the competition

== Episodes ==
=== Episode 1 ===
- Airdate: September 23, 2013
- Task: To design and sell custom-made T-shirts in high street store Penneys.
- Project managers
  - Athena: Daniella Moyles
  - Iconic: Mikey Graham
- Winning team: Athena
- Losing Team: Iconic
  - Reasons for loss: Iconic sold the least. Their visual design was not appealing and further errors such as spelling mistakes worsened their loss.
- Sent to boardroom: Mikey Graham, Martin Moloney, and Nick Leeson
- Fired: Martin Moloney - Caroline felt that Martin 'did not want it bad enough'. Martin also oversaw the spelling mistake and he did not say anything.

=== Episode 2 ===
- Airdate: September 30, 2013
- Task: To roll out a themed event for Carling lager. The team that impresses Carling the most wins.
- Corporate changes: Edele and Emma moved to Iconic, while Maclean and Michael moved to Athena.
- Project managers
  - Athena: Amanda Brunker
  - Iconic: Emma Quinlan
- Winning team: Athena
- Losing Team: Iconic
  - Reasons for loss: Despite winning the public vote, Carling felt that Iconic missed the brief. Furthermore, Carling felt that their event could not be rolled out to pubs nationwide.
- Sent to boardroom: Emma Quinlan, Edele Lynch, and Nick Leeson
- Fired: Emma Quinlan - Caroline felt that the failure of the team and the idea of the event laid on Emma. Another issue was that Emma could not admit that she was wrong. She led her team down the wrong path, and Caroline was disappointed as this was Emma's area of expertise.

== Celebrity Apprentice: You're Fired ==
Celebrity Apprentice: You're Fired is the follow-on show to Celebrity Apprentice Ireland. The first show directly followed the first episode of Celebrity Apprentice Ireland on TV3. The show is hosted by Anton Savage. The 30 minute show features a two-person celebrity guest panel in front of a studio audience that discusses the episode just aired and the fired apprentice from that episode is also interviewed.
