= Daniella Moyles =

Irish model, presenter and psychotherapist

Daniella Moyles is an Irish psychotherapist, broadcaster and former model from Naas, County Kildare. She has worked as a broadcaster for RTÉ, iRadio and Spin 1038. In 2017 she quit her presenting role to travel the world. She obtained a degree in psychotherapy in 2024.

== Career ==
Moyles began modelling in the early 2000's, placing third in the Miss Ireland contest. In 2009 she was a contestant in, Total Xposure, TV3's search for a new presenter. She placed sixth in the contest. In the early 2010's, she presented Bulletin TV, a Red Bull sponsored sports series for RTÉ Two. In 2012, she reported for RTÉ's The Movie Show. In 2013, she was a contestant on the Celebrity Apprentice Ireland, reaching week 6. A radio career in iRadio and Spin 1038 followed, before she decided to step away from broadcasting to travel. She returned to broadcasting in 2025 as a psychotherapist for the Virgin Media Television series Dinner with the Enemy.

== Personal life ==
Moyles married Andrew Kenny in September 2024, they have one son.

== Bibliography ==
- Moyles, Daniella (2020). Jump - One Girl's Search For Meaning. Gill Books. ISBN 9780717186792.
