= Adare Productions =

Irish television production company

- Industry: Entertainment television
- Founded: 1993
- Headquarters: Ireland

Adare Productions is an Irish entertainment television production company. It has produced numerous television shows which have been broadcast in Ireland, including Delegation, Livin' with Lucy, Hanging with Hector, The Fame Game, and Fáilte Towers for Radio Telefís Éireann, and Glas Vegas, Junior Eurovision Song Contest and Underdogs for TG4. The company is credited with discovering numerous television presenters.

== Origin and further details ==
Adare Productions was established in 1993. The company claims to have produced at least fourteen different entertainment series, eleven young peoples' series, four different lifestyle series, more than three hundred hours of live studio programmes and more than forty hours of music programmes. It has discovered presenters such as Caroline Morahan, Lucy Kennedy and Hector Ó hEochagáin.

Lynda McQuaid has been executive producer on Fáilte Towers and producer and director on The Apprentice.

== Recent television credits ==
=== Underdogs (2006) ===
Underdogs was a television programme broadcast on TG4. It featured "underdog" players of Gaelic games, focusing on those individuals who had never played senior inter-county football or hurling or received a nomination for a GAA All-Star, and offering them the chance to compete against teams of high quality. The first series was specifically dedicated to male footballers and hurlers. In June 2008, Adare Productions requested female applications for a follow-up series of The Underdogs. Brian Mullins managed the winning team which competed against the All-Ireland champions the following December.

=== Glas Vegas (2007) ===
Glas Vegas, which was first broadcast on TG4 in August 2007, saw the introduction of a new presenter, Gemma Ní Chionnaith.

=== Fáilte Towers (2008) ===
Fáilte Towers was broadcast on RTÉ One in August 2008, succeeding such shows as Cabin Fever and Celebrity Farm. A reality style television programme in a brand new format, it was presented by Aidan Power and Bazil Ashmawy and the concept involved thirteen celebrities running a hotel for sixteen days and nights in order to win money for their designated charities. It was unpopular with critics but enjoyed by the general public, with the final receiving nearly a million viewers and the entire series regularly receiving between 350,000 and 450,000 viewers throughout its run. The format for the show even attracted interest from overseas buyers, including investors from England, but RTÉ said at the time that “no agreements [would] be reached until the current series has finished”. Nevertheless, the Irish Independent named Fáilte Towers as one of the six worst television programmes of 2008, describing it as "car crash television".
