= Biddy Basketball =

Youth oriented basketball competitions

Biddy basketball, youth basketball or biddy ball, & or ‘’’Mini Basketball’’’ is a type of basketball game that is played by youths. The game is popular internationally, and tournaments are held in places such as the United States, Puerto Rico and other countries. The game is played by boys and girls and unisex teams may be formed.

== History ==
The competition is estimated to have first been created during either 1950 or 1951, by American sports enthusiast Jay Archer of Scranton, Pennsylvania.

In 1977, the town of Teaneck, New Jersey, hosted the "Junior Biddy National Tournament" with American teams from as far as Dallas, Texas attending and an international one from Puerto Rico. That tournament's championship was won by a team from New Orleans, Louisiana.

== Rules and regulations ==
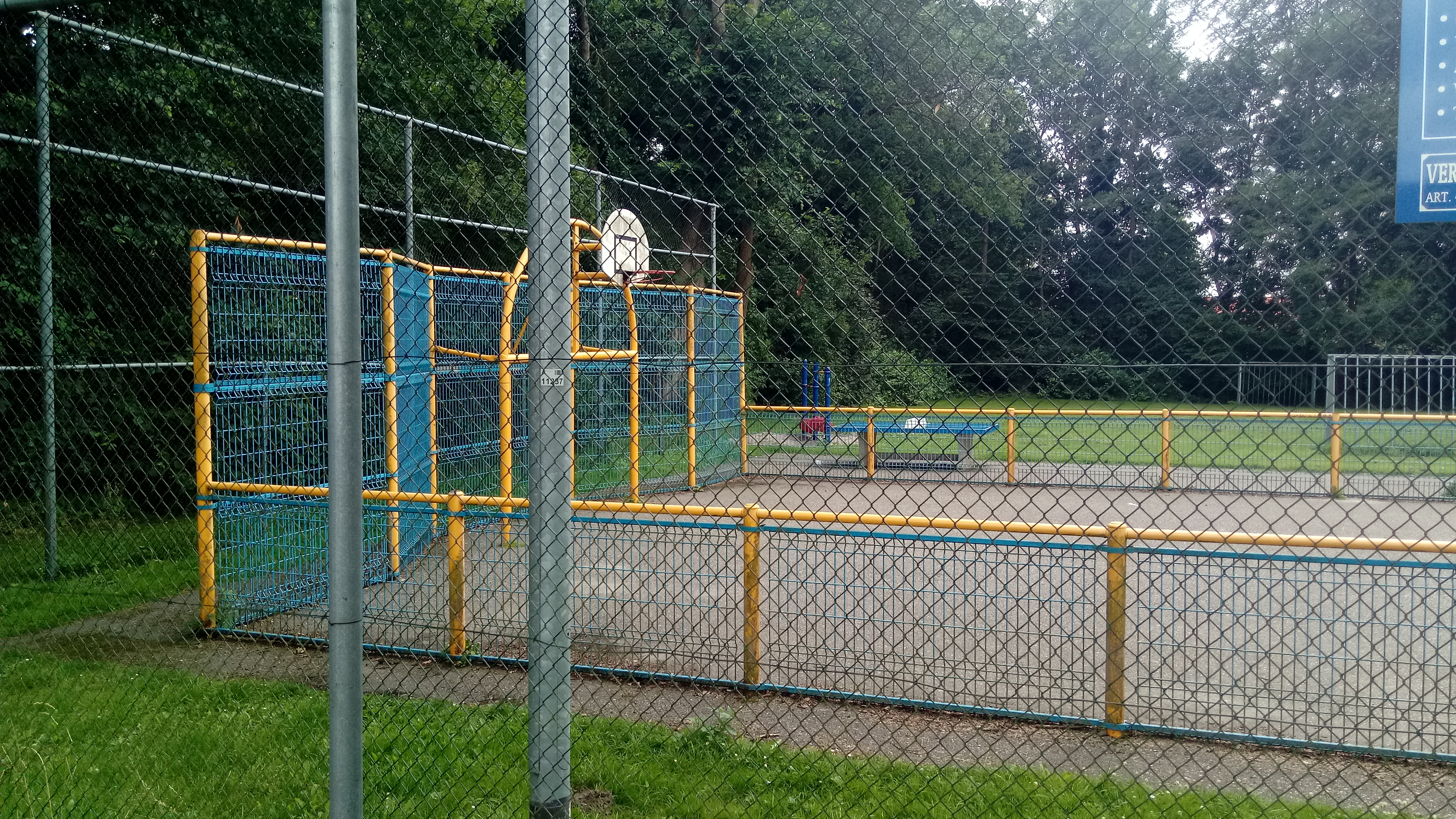
A youth basketball court. This court could be used for biddy basketball games or tournaments.

Depending on the formality of the games, rules can be similar to FIBA regulated games in a tournament setting or, in an informal setting such as a pick-up game, then the rules can be more akin to those observed during a streetball competition.

USA Basketball has published a set of rules for youth basketball games that is published online. According to those rules, players aged 7–8 shall play on a 50x42 sized court, with a basket height of eight feet, and a fourteen feet distance from the free throw line to the basket, while 9 to 11 year olds shall play on a 74x50 court and use a nine feet height hoop, with the free throw line also distanced from the basket by fourteen feet. At the group age of 12 to 14 year olds, the dimensions should be a ten feet basket in a 84x50 or 94x50 court, with the three-point line first being introduced at the Biddy level for this age group and being 19 feet from the basket, and the free throw line at 15 feet, while the last age group, the one made up by boys and girls between school grades ninth and twelfth, should be playing at a 94x50 court, with a basket ten feet above the court floor, and 15 feet separating the free throw line from the basket. The most notable difference in measures between the courts used by 12 to 14 year olds and ninth to twelve graders is the three point line distance, which shall be increased to 22 feet in distance for the latter.

USA Basketball's rules, however, are not universally used and can vary from one tournament to the other. The 1977 tournament in Teaneck, New Jersey, for example, was limited to 9 to 12 year olds.

== Tournaments ==
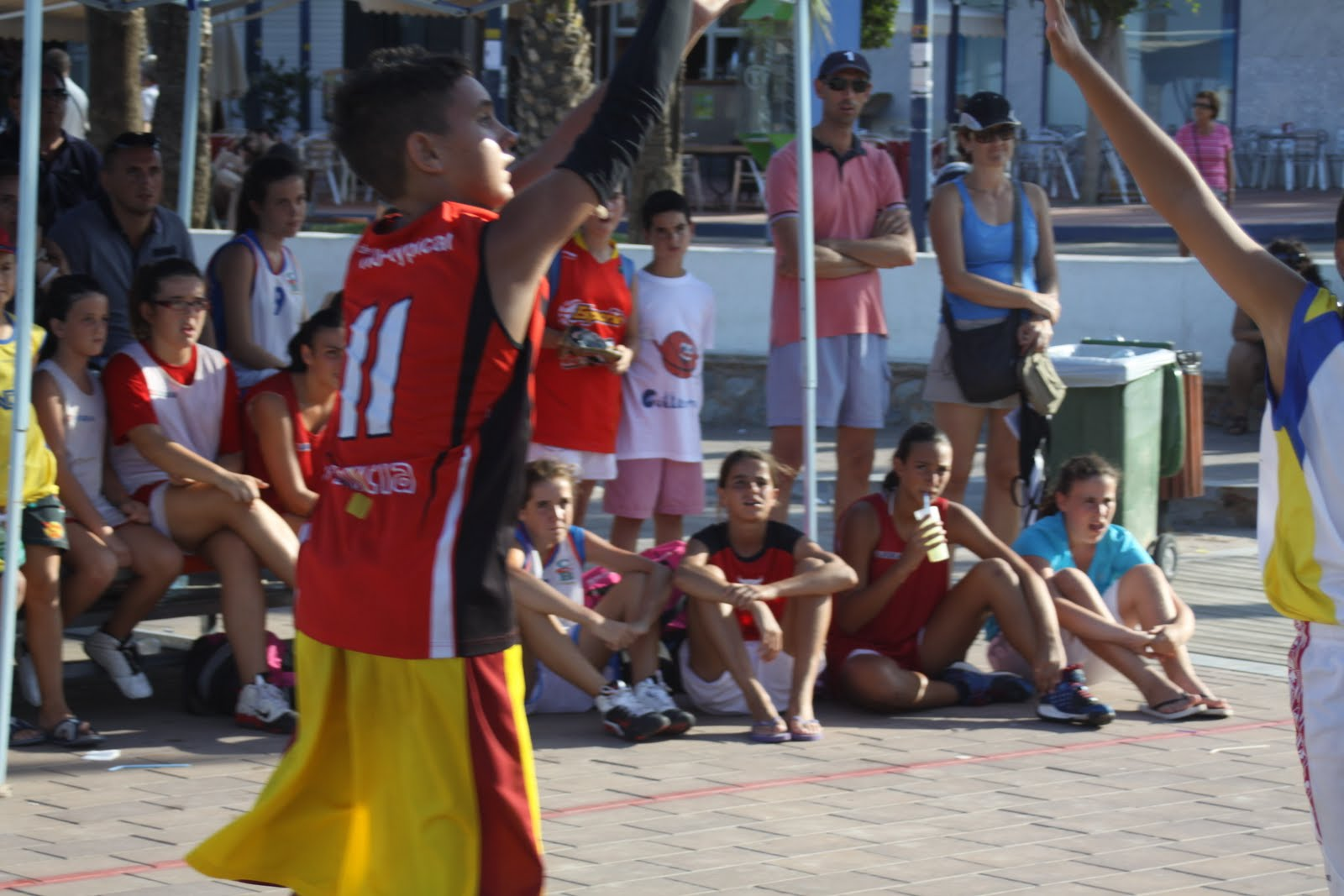
A young basketball player playing in a Biddy game in Spain.

Formal biddy basketball tournaments are usually played for championships and may have a structure that includes a playoffs and a finals best-of series to decide the tournament championship teams. Teams may have to pay a joining fee and players may have to pay a per-player fee (usually smaller than the team fee) in order to join as well.

== See also ==
- Little League baseball
- Mini Basketball.org.uk
