= Total Xposure =

Irish television series

- Judges: Michael O'Doherty; Emma Ledden; Gerry Lundberg
- Country of origin: Ireland
- No. of seasons: 1
- No. of episodes: 7

Production
- Running time: 60 minutes (45 minutes without commercials)

Original release
- Network: TV3
- Release: 3 June – 11 August 2009

Related
- Xposé; The Selection Box

Total Xposure is a seven-week reality television show broadcast by TV3 in Ireland It involved a nationwide search to find a new presenter for the channel's prime time entertainment magazine programme Xposé. Total Xposure consisted of a group of ten contestants chosen specifically for the show, most of whom had no prior presenting experience —they did however receive a quick course in presentational technique prior to the competition's commencement. The prize was a six-month contract as presenter of TV3's entertainment news show Xpose.

The winner of Total Xposure was Sean Munsanje, a 28-year-old contestant from Dublin. A public vote saw him beat Simon Atkins and Ruth O'Neill in the final on 11 August 2009. Munsanje thus became the first ever non-female presenter of Xpose. On 5 July 2010 it was announced that Sean Munsanje would be leaving Xpose at the end of August, a year after he won the reality TV competition Total Xposure.

== Background ==
Total Xposure came about when original host of Xposé, Lorraine Keane, quit the post in early 2009 in the hope of spending more time with her family. Keane, on holiday in France, was said to not have watched the final but was aware of the show and the identity of the winner.

== Judges ==
The three judges were Michael O'Doherty, Emma Ledden and Gerry Lundberg. Each received expenses of a figure in the range of €5,000–€10,000 for participating the show. O'Doherty claimed: "We didn't do it for the money, we did it for fun".

== Contestants ==
Twenty contestants were selected from among 1,000 applicants. In the first week they were whittled down to ten: five men and five women. The ten finalists, in alphabetical order, were Simon Atkins, Niamh Buffini, Sharon Clancy, Michael Coughlan, Michelle Forde, Anthony Kelly, Stuart McQuitty, Daniella Moyles, Sean Munsanje and Ruth O'Neill. They were unveiled at the Krystle nightclub in Dublin on 30 June 2009.

- Winner: Sean Munsanje
- Runner-up: Simon Atkins
- 2nd Runner-up: Ruth O'Neill
- 4: Anthony Kelly
- 5: Stuart McQuitty
- 6: Daniella Moyles

=== Results summary ===
Place	Contestant	Week 1	Week 2	Week 3	Week 4	Week 5	Week 6	Week 7	Final
1	Sean Munsanje	Safe	Safe	Safe	Safe	Safe	Safe	Safe	Winner
2	Simon Atkins	Safe	Safe	Safe	Safe	Safe	Safe	Safe	2nd Place
3	Ruth O'Neill	Safe	Safe	Safe	Safe	Safe	Safe	Bottom 3	3rd Place
4	Anthony Kelly	Safe	Bottom 2	Bottom 2	Bottom 2	Bottom 2	Bottom 2	Bottom 3	Eliminated
5	Stuart McQuitty	Safe	Safe	Safe	Safe	Safe	Safe	Bottom 3	Eliminated
6	Daniella Moyles	Safe	Safe	Safe	Safe	Safe	Bottom 2	Eliminated (Week 6)	
7	Sharon Clancy	Safe	Safe	Safe	Safe	Bottom 2	Eliminated (Week 5)		
8	Michael Coughlan	Safe	Safe	Safe	Bottom 2	Eliminated (Week 4)			
9	Niamh Buffini	Safe	Safe	Bottom 2	Eliminated (Week 3)				
10	Michelle Forde	Safe	Bottom 2	Eliminated (Week 2)					
11	10 Contestants	Eliminated (Week 1)							

== Episode list ==
Episode 1 (30 June): Twenty contestants were given the task of reading from an autoque. The judges selected ten to continue with the competition.

Episode 2 (7 July): The contestants had to do a vox pop to camera.

Episode 3 (14 July): The contestants were judged on their style for a photo shot for a magazine, they also have to ad-lib a report from a prop.

Episode 4 (21 July): The contestants were brought to a VIP birthday bash and they have to interview VIPs on the red carpet.

Episode 5 (28 July): The contestants had to research a news item and do a report in front of the judges. Daniella Moyles was voted off the show this week, with Anthony Kelly surviving the public vote. Moyles had been criticised by the judges for "staying within her comfort zone". She had conducted an interview with Miss Universe Ireland, Diana Donnelly. Moyles was widely known on the social circuit in Kildare.

Episode 6 (4 August): The contestants went to the Galway Races where they were split into two groups.

Episode 7 (11 August): The contestants presented an Xposé news report.

=== Results ===
Sean Munsanje was declared the new host of Xposé live on television after the final results show on 11 August 2009. He received a prize of a six-month contract worth €20,000 and was welcomed by his fellow Xposé presenters afterwards. Producer Debbie O'Donnell later spoke of her delight to have a male working on Xpose. Munsanje was soon being approached by strangers and offered free items of clothing.

Munsanje had been the "hot favourite" to win the show, with one bookmaker paying out early to those who had gambled on him. Ruth O'Neill had been second favourite to win. The remaining finalist, Simon Atkins, from Castlebar, County Mayo, received public support from music manager and The X Factor judge Louis Walsh, who is from Kiltimagh, County Mayo, before the final. All the presenters, contestants, judges and crew, bar presenter Lisa Cannon who had work commitments, celebrated at a party afterwards. The following day, the finalists made radio and television appearances on breakfast show Ireland AM and Today FM morning programme The Ray D'Arcy Show.

== Reception ==
The Sunday Independent, writing with one episode remaining, said the show had "fallen decidedly flat", having "promised so much fluffiness and friction" and berated the judges, O'Doherty for "taking to the floor and consuming as much, if not more, airtime than the contestants", Ledden because she "looks and acts matronly" and Lundberg who "has been totally redundant, proffering little to the programme other than an odd grunt". Pat Stacey, writing in the Evening Herald, declared that the show was not "a case of a dead horse being sliced open and its entrails cynically strung out like garland in order to fill the crater-like creativity gaps in the summer schedule" but "a cunning post-modernist television masterpiece".
