= Podge and Rodge =

- A Scare at Bedtime characters
- First appearance: The Den (Podge) (1990); Christmas Crisis II (Rodge) (1996)
- Last appearance: The Den (Podge) (2020); The Podge and Rodge Show (Rodge) (2019)
- Created by: Ciaran Morrison and Mick O'Hara
- Portrayed by: Ciaran Morrison and Mick O'Hara

Pádraig Judas O'Leprosy and Rodraig Spartacus O'Leprosy (born 1941) are the central characters of Irish television series A Scare at Bedtime, created and performed by Ciaran Morrison and Mick O'Hara. More recently, the brothers have presented The Podge and Rodge Show, a chat show in the same vein, and Podge & Rodge's Stickit Inn, set in a pub. Morrison and O'Hara also created and perform the characters of Zig and Zag, Bronx Bunny, and Teddy T.

== Character history ==
=== Origins ===
Podge originally appeared as a "villain" character on the children's programming block, The Den. He was introduced in 1990, as an ordinary puppet that Zag (of Zig and Zag) had found in a box amongst the rubbish behind an old joke shop. Dubbing the puppet "Podge," Zag used him to practice ventriloquism, and would put on the "Podge and Zag" show, which a jealous Zig usually interrupted.

During one of these shorts an unidentified voiceover can be heard saying to Zag, "aren't you a smelly stupid ugly alien". The character of Podge was then revealed to be alive to the audience, with the ability to speak and move. He also acted as an antagonist to Zig, often bullying him, or encouraging him to commit acts of nuisance such as stealing a bike.

Other characters, such as Zag and the presenter Ray D'Arcy remained oblivious to Podge's true nature for some time; Podge can occasionally be seen to be moving in the background during continuity announcements between programmes, or be seen scheming on his own, and letters and pictures would pour in from the viewing children trying to let them know that the little puppet was evil.

Eventually, after Zig finally told Zag and Ray the truth, Podge made a power play and took over the programme for a day, revealing that he had been brought to life by a magician, but then sealed away when he turned evil. Podge also possessed some magical powers of his own that he'd learned from the magician, and turned one of the crew members into a teapot. He was finally dealt with when the magician arrived at the end of the programming day, hypnotized Podge (who the magician called "Albert"), and took Podge away.

=== As a recurring villain ===
Podge once attempted to ruin Christmas for The Den crew by kidnapping Santa and putting on his suit.

Following his initial "story arc," Podge became a recurring presence on The Den over the next six years, causing trouble by using one of many paper-thins disguises that the gang could never see through, despite his constant insults and use his catchphrase, "Oh really?" Over the years, he posed as a child named "Patrick Egdop," a postman also named Patrick, a leprechaun, a trick-or-treater, a health inspector, a taxi-driver, and a builder named "Diglas McDoug." He physically fought with Dustin the Turkey upon their first meeting, establishing a pattern that would often repeat when they met again; once, he locked Dustin in the cupboard under the stairs and attempted to take his place by means of disguising himself with a few feathers and a coffee cup for a beak. He often sought to eat Zuppy, who could always see through his disguises and was responsible for his being caught out several times. His "magical" origins were never referred to again, but he retained some of his powers, such as an ability to disappear into thin air to escape when his disguises were seen through.

Podge's most daring scheme was 1992's "Christmas Crisis," in which he tried to ensure that Zig would receive no presents from Santa Claus, using his postman disguise to enter their home, break one of the presents, for which Zig would be blamed, and also make off with a bottle of "Scent of Man", a cologne which would be a recurring motif for the character, often revealing his identity. Zig was able to prove his innocence, but Podge in his right mind, was still intent on ruining Christmas, taking the gang's Christmas letters and not delivering them to Santa. When The Den crew set out to do the job themselves, Podge kidnapped Santa and took his place but was thwarted in the end.

Eventually, in 1996, Podge was finally well and truly caught by the Den gang, only to be freed by his never-before-seen twin brother, Rodge, posing as a policeman, who escorted him away. The "Dastardly Duo" continued to make trouble for the gang over the following year, mostly on the holidays; they staged "Christmas Crisis II" in 1996 to try and ruin the gang's Christmas once again. Rodge's precise origins were never gone into (the young children who were the programme's target audience had not been around for Podge's own introduction years before, after all, so it didn't really matter), but he possessed the same "vanishing" power Podge did, as well as the same fondness for Scent of Man and taste for dog. The brothers had particular contempt for Echo Island, especially the version broadcast in Irish. Podge then later returns to The Den during the 2020 series where he first appeared as a Policeman that threatens to shut the whole show down, and then he came back during Christmas 2020 where he came back as an elf where he kidnapped Zag to the props room to get him trapped and make Podge being a temporary replacement, until Santa arrives where Podge didn't want to invite him around but Santa has other plans where he thinks that the elf (Podge) is a imposter and then teleporting him to the snow globe as a punishment and the gang saves Zag out from the props room.

=== Ballydung ===
In 1997, Podge and Rodge were transitioned from the Den to their own, adult-oriented comedy show, A Scare at Bedtime. The show ignored their established history from their earlier, child-friendly appearances, and created a new one for them: in this series, the aged brothers live in Ballydung Manor, a fictional estate located their fictional hometown in Ballydung (off the bypass past Ballywank) in County Ring, a converted asylum which they share with an insane old nurse they call "Granny," as well as their disease-ridden pet cat Pox, and a nicotine-addicted monkey named Spunky. By this show's telling of events, the two brothers have lived together for decades, and hate one another, but Podge has repeatedly sabotaged any attempts by Rodge to leave him and improve his life.

Ballydung Manor may be reached by dialling Ballydung 666 from a telephone. In the earliest seasons of the show, the brothers' shared bedroom was the only part of the manor shown, but in later years, their kitchen was also used. This remained largely the case during the follow-up series The Podge and Rodge Show, although the living room was featured in the Bogmannay special on New Year's Eve 2006. The underground dungeon of Ballydung Manor was also shown in an episode of the chat show when Podge and Rodge invited guest Sheana Keane to partake in a gruesome game of Operation!.

Another location known to be in Ballydung is "The Stickitt Inn", which features on the chat show. Ballydung also has a bypass which was blocked off by a swarm of locusts on the Christmas Special of 2006, A Frightmare Before Christmas, thus preventing any of the guests attending the show.

== Television and radio shows ==
=== A Scare at Bedtime (1997–2006) ===
A Scare at Bedtime took its name from the nightly RTÉ show called A Prayer at Bedtime, which overlaid the text of a Roman Catholic prayer over serene images with choral music playing. A Scare at Bedtime, first aired in 1997, is close to being the polar opposite of this, with extremely adult content, lewd jokes and slightly obscene anecdotes being related by the two puppets. Their origins on the Den are largely ignored, as the backstory gradually established on A Scare at Bedtime, presents them to be both in their fifties (although they don't look any different from how they used to), and residing in Ballydung Manor, the former Ballydung Asylum. Rumor has it that their parents left them in the asylum many years ago, and in revenge, Rodge took an axe to them both. But no bodies were ever found. They live with a lunatic nurse that they call "Granny" who practices the black arts (since she is dating Satan, whom they refer to as the "quare fella" throughout the series) and Pox the cat who suffers from rabies, the pox, and extreme violence at the hands of its two owners. Their hobbies include cockfighting and exorcisms of which Father Flange occasionally does special sessions. They have been given full names also: Padraig Judas O'Leprosy and Rodraig Spartacus O'Leprosy.

Each episode follows the same pattern: Rodge, the dumber of the two, arrives home. Originally the pair would get into bed but in recent seasons they sit at the kitchen table. They talk about what Rodge was doing, with Podge usually insulting him. This leads Podge on to telling a story (acted out by live actors) about some people (whose names are usually sexual innuendos, e.g. Enda Meshank, Chris Peacock, Ulick McGee) who inevitably come to an unpleasant end. Rodge interrupts the story with stupid comments and/or reference to masturbation. It ends with Podge punishing Rodge for no reason.

A Scare at Bedtime never officially ended and the show has run to nine series as of January 2006, with the first five series available on DVD. An eight-disc DVD box set of all nine seasons of 150 episodes (including fifty never for sale before) was released at Halloween 2010. The series has aired in both the UK and Ireland on RTÉ Two, Tara TV, BBC UK Play and the Paramount Comedy Channel. A Scare at Bedtime was nominated in the Best Entertainment Programme category of the Irish Film and Television Academy Awards in both 1999 and 2000. Winning the IFTA for Best Entertainment Programme in 2000.

=== Podge and Rodge's TV Bodges (2000) ===
In 2000, Podge and Rodge hosted a series made up of ten eight-minute episodes entitled Podge & Rodge's TV Bodges for BBC Prime. It was a collection of TV mishaps akin to It'll be Alright on the Night. The series was broadcast all over the world via BBC Worldwide.

=== Ballydung Radio (2000) ===
Podge and Rodge were commissioned by UK Play in 2000 to create a music/comedy hybrid show. 20 x 30min programmes were broadcast. Podge and Rodge hosted the series from their home made pirate radio studio set up in Ballydung Manor. The show featured pop videos of the moment in between comedy links performed by the duo.

=== RTÉ Two relaunch (2004) ===
Podge and Rodge hosted the relaunch of Network 2 as RTÉ Two in 2004. They introduced the night's television programming which consisted of The Premiership at 20:00 followed by a highlights reel of Network 2, new comedy sketch show Stew at 21:30, a repeat broadcast of the final episode of Paths to Freedom and the television premiere of the film Spin the Bottle. The relaunch was part of an RTÉ initiative to promote "edgier" and "riskier" viewing that would "push the boundaries", which included a gay theme night.

=== The Podge and Rodge Show (2006–2010) ===
First aired on 6 February 2006, The Podge and Rodge Show fulfilled the duo's main aim by being their first chat show. It was co-hosted by Lucy Kennedy and airs at 22:30 on Monday and 22:50 on Tuesday nights on RTÉ Two. The show has been a phenomenal ratings success, regularly getting over 400,000 viewers a show. It won "Favourite Irish TV Show" for two years in a row at the 2006 and 2007 TV Now Awards. It was also nominated for an IFTA Award for "Best Entertainment Show 2007" and won the award in 2008. The second series began on RTÉ Two on 16 October 2006, with a month break in January before returning on 5 February 2007 and running until April 2007. A third series, began on 15 October 2007 and ran until 15 April 2008 with a month break in January. The fourth series kicked off on 20 October 2008 without Lucy Kennedy, who was replaced by weekly female guest hosts. The show again took a break over Christmas and returned on 9 February 2009 for a further 10-week run with Caroline Morahan as the new host until 14 April 2009. Which turned out to be the final episode of the series as it was announced that a new format Podge & Rodge's Stickit Inn, a celebrity pub quiz would replace the chat show in the Autumn 2009 schedule. However, the show returned in the Stickit Inn pub set in 2010, and ran until 27 April 2010.

==== Christmas special ====
Podge and Rodge hosted a special show from Ballydung Manor on 19 December 2006, entitled A Frightmare Before Christmas. It celebrated Christmas from their perspective, a reality where none of the intended guests turned up, and imaginary scenarios where the worst possible guests did. In reality Podge and Rodge and Lucy were left in the darkness of Ballydung Manor as the thunder raged outside, imagining their nightmare guests.

==== New Year's Eve specials ====
Podge and Rodge rang in 2007 on 31 December in a special programme lasting over forty minutes instead of the usual thirty-minute format. The New Year's Eve show was called Bogmanay (a play on Hogmanay). It was broadcast on RTÉ Two from 22:30.

On the program, the hosts reviewed events from their year. They also presented the Feckin' Eejit of the Year Awards (FEEJITs) in reference to Irish culture. Nine nominees were selected from television, entertainment, sport, and politics.

Guests included Edele and Keavy Lynch of B*Witched fame, Mary Black, Jason Donovan and Freddie Starr returned as the Ballydung Butler for the evening.

Such was the success of the original Bogmanay, Podge and Rodge hosted a second Bogmanay to ring in 2008. It featured guests Miss Ireland, Bláthnaid McKenna and boxer Frank Bruno as well as Mr. Gest who was unable to be interviewed as Lucy Kennedy, venturing into his dressing room, discovered he had turned into an ape. Instead, a number of previously unseen clips which were not allowed to be shown before midnight were shown, including some in which Lucy Kennedy swore. A number of "Half- Arse Hero" awards were handed out, although none of the recipients (who included Steve Staunton) were present to accept them.

==== People in Need Telethon 2007 special ====
On Friday 26 October 2007 for the People in Need Telethon Podge and Rodge finally got to interview their nemesis and ultimate rival, the then host of The Late Late Show and "Ireland's Alan Partridge" Pat Kenny. "Do the words lamb and slaughter mean anything to you?" He was asked: "Does it get on your tits though when people are saying, Jaysus – Pat Kenny earns how much? He should be paying me to watch that shite!" He was also asked: "Where did the nickname Pat the Plank come from? Who came up with that beauty?" Pat blamed it on Eamon Dunphy. "Are you bored with the wood puns?" they asked to which Pat jibed: "In fairness lads I'm not the puppet round here." Then it was time for a quick game of "Plankety Plank" which featured author Patricia Cornwell – he'd forgotten her name; Dawn French – he'd told her he'd give her €10 not to get out of bed; Brigitte Nielsen – she'd forced him to dance live on TV. Comparing Pat's bike to Gaybo's Harley-Davidson they asked: "Did Fisher Price make that?" And then it was back to Tubbicino, Teletubby.

==== Best of The Podge and Rodge Show ====
From 21 July 2009, RTÉ began showing a compilation of the best moments of the first three series of The Podge and Rodge Show. Ten half-hour episodes were produced and aired on RTÉ 2 at 10.30 pm.

=== Podge and Rodge's Stickit Inn (2009) ===
As part of the new Autumn line-up on RTÉ Two it was announced that the Ballydung brothers returned in a new venue of a pub set. Podge & Rodge's Stickit Inn; began as a celebrity pub quiz, but reverted to a late night chat and music entertainment show. The dirty duo are joined by a new female co-host in the shape of a busty Italian barmaid to be played by Virginia Macari and their resident musician Johnny Dorgan, the man with the organ.

=== The Podge and Rodge Show (2018) ===
It was announced on 16 August 2018 that Dorieann Garrihy would be joining Podge and Rodge as their new co-host. The series began broadcasting on 22 October 2018.

== Live ==
=== "Desperate for Housewives" ===
Podge and Rodge present the 2007 Meteor Awards on RTÉ TV

In April 2006, radio ads played on RTÉ radio stations revealed that the personas Podge and Rodge would be appearing in their first ever live stage show entitled "Desperate for Housewives" in Vicar Street in Dublin. The show took place in Autumn 2006 for an initial run of 12 dates. The tickets for the first six dates sold out in a record hour and a half on the day of release. Six days after the release of the release, and all the tickets were sold out.

=== "It's a Podge and Rodge Show...Get Me Outta Here!" ===
Podge and Rodge returned to Vicar Street with a brand new stage show in April 2008. Tickets went on sale on 6 December 2007. Initially 12 dates were announced, with a further 3 dates added for May 2008. A total of fifteen nights were played.

=== 2007 Meteor Awards ===
Podge and Rodge hosted the 2007 Meteor Awards in the Point Depot in Dublin on 1 February 2007. They were joined in their presenting duties by comedian Deirdre O' Kane. Kaiser Chiefs, Clannad, Director, The Feeling and The Blizzards were among the bands who performed on the night.

== Newspaper column ==
=== A Politically Incorrect Broadcast by Podge and Rodge ===
Podge and Rodge have a page published weekly in The Irish Daily Star newspaper. Every Wednesday the pair write lewd and satirical columns.

== Charity magazine editing ==
=== RTÉ Guide ===
They've also edited an edition of the RTÉ Guide for People in Need

== Awards ==
- Irish Film and Television Awards include:
  - Best Entertainment Show: A Scare at Bedtime – 1999 Nomination
  - Best Entertainment Show: A Scare at Bedtime – 2000 WON
  - Best Entertainment Show: The Podge & Rodge Show – 2007 Nomination
  - BSE/IFB & NIFTC Breakthrough Talent Award for Lucy Kennedy for her role as co-host – 2007 Nomination
  - Best Entertainment Show: The Podge & Rodge Show – 2008 WON
  - Best Entertainment Show: The Podge & Rodge Show – 2009 Nomination
- TV Now Awards include:
  - Favourite Television Programme: The Podge & Rodge Show – 2006 WON
  - Favourite Television Programme: The Podge & Rodge Show – 2007 WON
  - Favourite Television Programme: The Podge & Rodge Show – 2008 Nomination
- 7th Annual Digital Media Awards:
  - Best Viral Marketing Campaign 2009 – 'Podge and Rodge on a PC'
- 31st John Caples International Awards:
  - Best Microsite 'Silver Award' 2009 – 'Podge and Rodge on a PC'
- Goss.ie - The Gossies:
  - Best TV Show - The Podge & Rodge Show - 2019 Nomination
  - Best Female TV Presenter - Doireann Garrihy - 2019 WON

== DVDs ==
=== The Podge and Rodge Show ===
DVD name	Release date	Bonus material	Ifco
The Podge and Rodge Show – The Best of Series One	3 November 2006	Unseen pilot interview with sports presenter George Hamilton, Even More Johnny Vegas, More Keith Duffy, Ainezone, Ballydung Weather with Martin King, Pole Dancing Competition.	15
The Podge and Rodge Show – The Cream of Series Two	2 November 2007	Miss Ballydung Pageant, Ballydung Idol, Sex Toy Show with Margo, A Load of Pointless Games, Photo album, Hidden Easter Eggs.	15
The Podge and Rodge Show – The Best of Series Three	14 November 2008	Jack Charlton half-hour special Uncut, Rock N Roulette jukebox, Secret Bloopers tape.	15
The Podge and Rodge Show – The Best of Series Four	13 November 2009	Podge and Rodge's Family Album, The Ballydung Jukebox. DVD cover design by Jim Fitzpatrick	15
The Podge and Rodge Show – Poxy Box	9 April 2010	The set features all four previous 'Best of' DVDs in a collectors box set.	15

=== A Scare at Bedtime ===
DVD name	Release date	Ep #	Additional Information	Ifco
Series One	2003	20	Non – broadcast pilot, Outrageous Outtakes	15
Series Two	2004	20	Uncensored version of 'Phone Home', Promotional Ads, Fester 'n' Ailin's crappy Jukebox, Outrageous Outtakes, Hidden Easter Eggs	15
Series Three	2005	20	More Outrageous Outtakes, Spunky ' the smoking' Monkey Easter Egg, Fester 'n' Ailin's crappy jukebox Version 2.0	15
Series One and Two boxset	2005	40	Non – broadcast pilot, Outrageous Outtakes, Uncensored version of 'Phone Home', Promotional Ads, Fester 'n' Ailin's crappy Jukebox, More Outrageous Outtakes, Hidden Easter Eggs	15
Series Four and Five boxset	4 May 2007	40	Outrageous Outtakes, Commentaries, Hidden Easter Eggs	15
Series Four	2008	20	More Outrageous Outtakes, Podge & Rodge commentary for 'Bargain Bride' episode.	15
Series Five	2008	20	Fester 'n' Ailin's Top 10 Greatest Hits	15
A Scare at Bedtime Complete	15 October 2010	150	This eight disc boxset contains all Nine Series of 150 episodes (including 50 never before released), including a range of extra features.	15

== Book ==
=== The Ballydung Bible ===
The Ballydung Bible

Podge and Rodge's first book, entitled The Ballydung Bible, was released on 5 October 2007. It reveals much about the history of Ballydung and the surrounding areas. One excerpt reveals that their last day spent with their mother was at the age of seven on 11 May 1948 after which they were locked away in Ballydung Asylum.

== Articles ==
- YouTube Brings Gem from Ireland – 1 November 2006 MP3 Newswire article wonders if YouTube can be a catalyst to bring Podge and Rodge to American TV.
