= Seán Munsanje =

Irish television presenter from Dublin

- Born: 10 July 1981 (age 45); Dublin, Ireland
- Education: B.A., Media Studies at National University of Ireland, Maynooth (NUIM)
- Occupation: Entertainment presenter
- Employer(s): TV3; FM104
- Known for: Total Xposure, Xposé

Seán Munsanje (born 10 July 1981) is an Irish television and radio presenter from Dublin. He has presented shows for several channels in his native country, including Raidió Teilifís Éireann, Channel 6 and, most recently, TV3.

On 11 August 2009, he won the TV3 reality television programme, Total Xposure, thus becoming the new presenter of the channel's prime time entertainment magazine programme Xposé. A public vote saw him beat Simon Atkins and Ruth O'Neill in the final on 11 August 2009. Munsanje thus became the first ever male presenter of Xposé .

He also was manager of temporary radio station for LGBT community, Pride Vibes in 2023 and 2024.

== Career ==
=== Education and early career ===
Munsanje was born in Dublin to an Irish mother and Zambian father. He spent his early years in Zambia and England, before his family returned to Ireland in 1993. Munsanje attended St. Flannan's College in Ennis, Waterford Institute of Technology, and the National University of Ireland, Maynooth, where he earned a degree in Media Studies. He has presented for both RTÉ Two and Channel 6. On TTV, he presented a ‘gig guide' each week for the former, while he presented the film show Take Six for the latter. He is also the resident movie critic on Dublin radio station FM104.

=== Total Xposure ===
Musanje was one of ten hopefuls who took part in Total Xposure aiming to win a prize of a presenting contract with TV3. He has said he rang his parents, who were holidaying in France, throughout the show and they flew in especially to attend the final.

He was named the new host of Xposé live on television after the final results show of Total Xposure on 11 August 2009. He had been the "hot favourite" to win the show, with one bookmaker paying out early to those who had gambled on him. He was awarded a six-month contract in television presenting worth €20,000 and was welcomed by his fellow Xposé presenters afterwards. Producer Debbie O'Donnell later spoke of her delight to have a male working on Xposé. Munsanje was soon being approached by strangers and offered free items of clothing. Following the show, he stated that he had not at that stage finalised his salary. On 5 July 2010, it was announced that Munsanje would leave the show at the end of August, a year after he won Total Xposure.

== Personal life ==
Munsanje married his partner, Chris Doyle, in 2013. In 2015, he and Doyle had a daughter.
