= A Scare at Bedtime =

- Opening titles
- Genre: Adult puppeteering Black comedy
- Created by: Ciaran Morrison; Mick O'Hara
- Developed by: Ciaran Morrison; Mick O'Hara
- Starring: Ciaran Morrison (Rodge); Mick O'Hara (Podge)
- Country of origin: Ireland
- Original language: English
- No. of episodes: 150 (list of episodes)

Production
- Running time: ~10 minutes

Original release
- Network: RTÉ Two (then Network 2)
- Release: 24 November 1997 – 9 January 2006

A Scare at Bedtime (also known as Podge and Rodge: A Scare at Bedtime) is an Irish television show, produced by Double Z Enterprises and broadcast by RTÉ, featuring the two puppets Podge and Rodge as the hosts of a spooky tales and urban myths comedy show. It ran from November 24, 1997 until January 9, 2006.

A Scare at Bedtime was originally commissioned by RTÉ to fill a ten-minute gap that was left before the 23:00 News due to the short running times of American shows that preceded it. This show took its name from the nightly RTÉ 1 show called A Prayer at Bedtime, which overlaid the text of a Roman Catholic prayer over serene images with choral music playing. A Scare at Bedtime, first aired in 1997, is close to being the polar opposite of this, with extremely adult content, lewd jokes and slightly obscene anecdotes being related by the two puppets and 'Tales of Caution' acted out in live action segments. Podge's origins on The Den is ignored, as the backstory gradually established on A Scare at Bedtime, presents Podge and his identical twin brother Rodge to be both in their sixties, and living in Ballydung Manor, a converted insane asylum for most of that time, with a lunatic nurse that they call "Granny" who practices the dark arts (since she is dating Satan, whom they refer to as the "quare fella" throughout the series) . They were also then given full names also: Padraig Judas O'Leprocy and Rodraig Spartacus O'Leprocy.

Each episode follows the same pattern: Rodge, the dumber of the two, arrives home. Originally the pair would get into bed but in later seasons they sat at the kitchen table. They talk about what Rodge was doing, with Podge usually insulting him. This leads Podge on to telling a story (acted out by live actors) about some people (whose names are usually sexual innuendos, e.g. Chris Peacock, Ulick McGee, Neil Down, Mickey Scratcher and Inspector Bush) who inevitably come to an unpleasant end. Rodge interrupts the story with stupid comments and/or reference to masturbation. It ends with Podge punishing Rodge for no reason.

Podge and Rodge have mimicked Irish folk duo Foster and Allen. The characters are called "Fester and Ailin'" and were seen on An Audience with Podge & Rodge satirically arguing with Foster and Allen, with each claiming the other copied their act. Fester states: "Ailin' here came out of the womb with that accordion on him". Fester and Ailin' also claim that Foster and Allen's song "Bunch of Thyme" was in fact a stolen copy of their original work "Bunch of Lesbians". Fester and Ailin's songs featured in the series included "Tropical Diseases", "The Monkey Song" and "Doing the Wife's Sisters on the Sly" as well as the classic yuletide number "There's a Dead Man Up The Chimney".

The show has run for nine series as of January 2006. The programme has aired in both the UK and Ireland on RTÉ Two, Tara TV, UK Play and the Paramount Comedy Channel. A Scare at Bedtime was nominated in the Best Entertainment Programme category of the Irish Film and Television Awards in both 1999 and 2000. Winning the IFTA for Best Entertainment Programme in 2000.

'A Scare at Bedtime Collection' is an eight disc DVD box set of all nine seasons of 150 episodes (including fifty never for sale before) that was released to coincide with Halloween 2010.

== TV specials ==
Podge & Rodge's Christmas Log: A half-hour Christmas Special featuring clips from the series broadcast on RTÉ 2 in December 2002.

An Audience with Podge & Rodge: An hour long precursor to The Podge and Rodge Show, was broadcast on RTÉ 2 on 26 December 2005 with guests Ray D'Arcy and Amanda Brunker. Music from Ding Dong Denny O'Reilly and VT inserts from various Irish personalities including Gerry Ryan, Nell McCafferty, Foster and Allen, PJ Gallagher, Mary Black with their memories and opinions of Podge and Rodge. There were also clips from A Scare at Bedtime. The show was filmed in front of a studio audience of skeletons and one man and his dog.

== Awards ==
Irish Film and Television Academy Awards:

- Best Entertainment Show – 1999 Nomination
- Best Entertainment Show – 2000 WON

== Home media ==
DVD name	Release date	Ep #	Additional information
Series One	2003	20	Non – broadcast pilot, Outrageous Outtakes
Series Two	2004	20	Uncensored version of 'Phone Home', Promotional Ads, Fester 'n' Ailin's crappy Jukebox, Outrageous Outtakes, Hidden Easter Eggs
Series Three	2005	20	More Outrageous Outtakes, Spunky ' the smoking' Monkey Easter Egg, Fester 'n' Ailin's crappy jukebox Version 2.0
Series One and Two boxset	2005	40	Non – broadcast pilot, Outrageous Outtakes, Uncensored version of 'Phone Home', Promotional Ads, Fester 'n' Ailin's crappy Jukebox, More Outrageous Outtakes, Hidden Easter Eggs
Series Four and Five boxset	4 May 2007	40	Outrageous Outtakes, Commentaries, Hidden Easter Eggs
A Scare at Bedtime Complete	15 Oct 2010	150	This eight disc boxset contains all Nine Series of 150 episodes (including 50 never before released), including a range of extra features.
