= Larry Gogan =

Irish broadcaster (1934–2020)

- Born: Lorcan Gogan; 3 May 1934; Dublin, Ireland
- Died: 7 January 2020 (aged 85); Dublin, Ireland
- Occupation: Broadcaster
- Years active: 1961–2019
- Employer: RTÉ
- Known for: "Just-a-Minute Quiz"
- Spouse: Florrie Duffy (m. 1963; died 2002)
- Children: 5
- Website: 2fm.rte.ie/larry

Lorcan "Larry" Gogan (3 May 1934 – 7 January 2020) was an Irish broadcaster working for RTÉ. He was a disc jockey on RTÉ Gold having previously worked on RTÉ 2fm. His show was The Golden Hour, during which he played old favourites and classic songs from yesteryear. Gogan spun the first disc on Radio 2, "Like Clockwork" by The Boomtown Rats. Louis Walsh described him as one of "the kings of Irish broadcasting".

He was given the Industry Award at the 2007 Meteor Awards.

== Early life ==
Lorcan Gogan was born in Dublin, Ireland, in 1934. He had seven siblings. He grew up in Fairview, where his father ran a shop.

== Career ==
Gogan started in radio in the early 1960s, presenting his first radio programme on RTÉ Radio 1. He became a well-known presenter on Radio 1, including sponsored programmes, and was one of a handful of presenters playing almost exclusively pop music. He was in the original lineup in 1979 of RTÉ Radio 2 (which later became RTÉ 2fm), a station on which he spun the first disc. He presented a regular show there until 2019.

Gogan had also presented a variety of television programmes including Pickin' The Pops, Go 2 Show and The Golden Hour.

Having previously commentated for television, Gogan was the Irish radio commentator for the Eurovision Song Contest. He provided commentary between the 1984 and 2001 contests, and again in 2008. Although he was dropped from the commentary team for the 2009 Contest he continued to be part of the Irish delegation up until the 2011 Contest.

On 8 January 2019, it was announced Gogan was moving from 2FM to RTÉ Gold, bringing to an end 40 years of presenting on 2FM. He presented his last programme on 2FM on Thursday 31 January, having started on 31 May 1979 as part of the original lineup.

=== The Golden Hour ===
Gogan presented The Golden Hour up until February 2014. He returned to a weekday slot in January 2010 after a period of Saturday and Sunday afternoon shows.

He had a high-profile interview with U2 drummer Larry Mullen Jr. in March 2009.

In 2011 he gained listeners in the JNLRs.

In February 2014, it was announced that he would present a new two-hour weekend show, entitled 'The Larry Gogan Show' instead of The Golden Hour.

=== "Just a Minute Quiz" ===
Gogan was famous for his "Just a Minute Quiz", which occurred during his radio show. When contestants get only a couple of questions correct, he was famous for the catchphrase "They didn't really suit you". The quiz had produced its fair share of bloopers which have gone down in Irish folklore. Question from February 2006: What famous star is followed by travellers? Answer: Joe Dolan.

=== Television ===
On 6 November 2008, Gogan appeared on Irish television to officially open Carrigstown's new community centre.

He hosted the 1980 National Song Contest (Irish heats for the Eurovision Song Contest) and provided the RTÉ television commentary at the 1978, 1980, 1981 and 1982 Eurovision Song Contest. Gogan also hosted heats for Castlebar Song Contest in 1968 and then from 1974 until 1977. He also presented the Cavan International Song Contest for a number of years in the early-mid 1980s.

In the 1960s he hosted Picking the Pops and the Go 2 Show, in the early days of RTÉ TV.

He was the face of Daz Washing Detergent from the 1960s to the 1990s in Ireland.

== Personal life ==
Gogan met his wife Florrie when she was 15. Both their fathers ran newspaper shops in Dublin. They were engaged two years later and married when she was 21. They had five children. Florrie developed breast cancer and died in January 2002 while Gogan was recovering from heart surgery. He says, "When something happens at work I say to myself 'I must tell Florrie that' and then I remember, she's not there any more"...

On his official website, Gogan listed Katy Lied by Steely Dan as his favourite album of all time, while the song that drove him mad was "Save Your Love" by Renée and Renato. His favourite film was Casablanca.

=== Death ===
Gogan died in the early hours of 7 January 2020 at a care centre in Bohernabreena, Dublin, following a short illness. He was 85. His funeral mass took place at the Church of St Pius X in Templeogue on 10 January 2020.

== Awards ==
In 1986, Gogan was honoured at the Jacob's Awards for his weekly show, Ireland's Top Thirty.

On 11 March 2005, Gogan was awarded the IRMA Honours Award "in recognition of his outstanding contribution to Irish music".

Gogan received the Industry Award at the 2007 Meteor Awards on 1 February that year. He was nominated in the category of Best Radio DJ – National at the 2010 Meteor Awards.

Year	Nominee / work	Award	Result
1986	Larry Gogan	Jacob's Awards	Won
1987	Larry Gogan	IRMA Music Award	Won
2005	Larry Gogan	IRMA Honours Award	Won
2007	Larry Gogan	Industry Award at the Meteor Awards	Won
2010	Larry Gogan	Industry Award at the Meteor Awards	Nominated

Media offices
Preceded by Mike Murphy	Eurovision Song Contest Ireland Commentator; 1978	Succeeded by Mike Murphy
Preceded by Mike Murphy	Eurovision Song Contest Ireland Commentator; 1980–1982	Succeeded by Terry Wogan
