= Caroline Morahan =

Irish actress and television host

- Born: 9 August 1977 (age 49); Drogheda, County Louth, Ireland
- Education: Bachelor of Arts in communication studies
- Alma mater: Dublin City University
- Occupations: Actress and television personality
- Spouse: Dáithí Ó Caoimh
- Partner: 2
- Website: Official website

Caroline Morahan (born 9 August 1977) is an Irish actress and television host. In 2010, she was chosen as the face of Littlewoods Ireland.

== Early life ==
Caroline Morahan graduated from Dublin City University with a Bachelor of Arts in communication studies, earning first class honors for her photographic thesis. During her university years she appeared in numerous short films and television pilots.

In September 2012, she married Dáithí Ó Caoimh. They have two children, Rowan and Ava.

== Career ==
In 1994, she made her television debut, at the age of 17, in soap opera Fair City as Barbara Cleary. In 2001, Morahan entered the reality TV series The Selection Box and was chosen from an open call of 2,000 to host The Fame Game. She hosted the show for five seasons. Later, she co-hosted the fashion programme Off the Rails from 2002 to 2007. Morahan left Off the Rails in 2007 to move back to acting.

She has guest hosted and appeared in a multitude of Irish television programmes, including The Panel, The Restaurant, The Late Late Show, Tubridy Tonight, Xposé, The Den, and The Health Squad. A guest appearance on The Podge and Rodge Show in 2008 led to the role of host in early 2009. She has appeared as the female lead in the Irish musical, I, Keano.

In 2009, she moved to Los Angeles, California to pursue acting career in Hollywood.

== Awards ==
In 2009, she was voted Sexiest TV Presenter in a poll by entertainment.ie.

== Filmography ==
=== Film ===
- Axis (voice) (2017)
- Mr. Thursday (2016)
- Lost & Found (2015)
- I Can't See You Anymore (2012)
- Howard Cantour.com (2012)
- Lionhead (2012)
- A Kiss for Jed (2011)
- What About Love (2024)
- I Hope We Can Still be Friends (2025)

=== Television ===
- The World's Best CBS (2019) - International judge
- "Disjointed" Netflix original series (2018) - DD
- Fir Bolg (2016)
- The Real O'Neals ABC (2016)
- Once Upon a Time ABC (2015) - Queen Elinor
- Big Mike (2011)
- The Cosmetic Surgery Show (2010)
- The Podge and Rodge Show (2008–2009)
- Winning Streak (2008) – charity special
- Class Act – (2008) - judge
- Telethon (2008) – guest host and sang for charity
- IFTAs Red Carpet Show (2008)
- It's My Show (2007, 2008) - judge
- The Afternoon Show (2007) – guest host
- Off the Rails (2002–2007)
- O2 in the Park (2005)
- Chance to Dance (2005)
- The Restaurant (2005)
- Karl Spain Wants a Woman (2005) - stylist
- The Health Squad (2004)
- The Panel (2003, 2005)
- Close Encounters with Keith Barry (2003) - participant
- Beyond the Hall Door (2003) – guest host
- Fame Game on the Run (2003)
- The Fame Game (2001–2003)
- Fair City (1992) - Barbara Cleary

=== Theatre ===
- Looking at the Sun (2022)
- Private Eyes (2016)
- The Weir (2015)
- She Stoops to Conquer (2014)
- Anglo: The Musical (2013)
- Pity the Proud Ones (2011)
- I, Keano (2008)

=== Web ===
- MSN Lifestyle - The Surf Report (2010)
- Doctor Who - Alternate Empire (2009) - Samantha

=== Radio ===
- 2FM Breakfast Show (2008)
