= TV Now =

- Publisher: Michael O'Doherty
- First issue: 2000
- Country: Ireland
- Based in: Dublin
- Language: English
- Website: tvnowmagazine.ie

TV Now (stylised as TV NOW) is an Irish magazine containing a television guide, interviews with television stars and other television-related items. It is part of the VIP publishing franchise of Michael O'Doherty.

TV Now was launched in 2000 as the last of O'Doherty's co-ordinated business ventures in Ireland with his former business partner John Ryan; it succeeded Magill in 1997 and VIP in 1999 and preceded later titles such as the teenage-oriented Kiss (2002), the glossy monthly targeted at women in the age group of eighteen to thirty-four Stellar and the failed New York Dog venture in New York City. TV Now competes with Ireland's most popular television magazine, the RTÉ Guide (also the most popular magazine in the country overall) and, more recently, with the Irish version of the United Kingdom's most popular television magazine What's on TV.

== Awards ==
The magazine gave its name to the Walkers Sensations TV Now Awards which were held annually at the Mansion House in Dublin. The 2007 event was attended by Kathryn Thomas, Lucy Kennedy and Caroline Morahan, all presenters of successful television shows on channels run by Raidió Teilifís Éireann (RTÉ).
