= Blogorrah.com =

bloggorah.com, also known as blogorrah, was a New York City-based Irish website owned by the publishing "empire" of John Ryan. The site was edited by Derek O'Connor in New York. It was known for satirising well-known social figures in Irish life such as politicians, models, actors and the media. Blogorrah regularly featured in Irish national newspapers and received radio coverage, with the Sunday Independent referring to it as "frankly disgusting", and it was described by the Irish Independent as "a sort of Phoenix without portfolio". Its end came when Ryan's publishing empire collapsed in 2007. A new blog The Chancer was launched in its place after Jim Carroll of The Irish Times questioned what Irish bloggers had written about before blogorrah.

== Background ==
Ryan's publishing company initially owned the publishing venture Stars on Sunday which folded with losses. He then set up the New York Dog magazine, which he promoted on The Late Late Show, and blogorrah.com. The site was edited by Derek O'Connor but mysteriously stopped filing new posts in July 2007. Ryan was also known for his business partnership with Michael O'Doherty, the owner of VIP magazine. After the collapse of his business empire in early 2007, Ryan was declared missing after he claimed a pet-food scare led to the closure of New York Dog. O'Doherty said he had not heard from Ryan for over a month. Before his disappearance Ryan had attended the Electric Picnic music festival in the company of fellow publisher Trevor White and soon after appeared as a guest on The Tubridy Show. However, a rival website then accused him of mistreating his workers and he left the country until his 2009 television return.

== Downfall ==
Blogorrah failed to update for a number of weeks, with their last normal post before its disappearance being 12 June 2007. On 21 June 2007 Blogorrah claimed the website was undergoing a redesign. But in July 2007 it left a claim that they were to return “very soon”, after a month of no usual updates whatsoever. This was followed by a post in the website's traditional style with the headline “Blogorrah Will Return (Very Soon). In The Meantime...” with a list of “Ten reasons why Blogorrah took July off”. This proved to be the last post before it shut down.
