= Kiss (Irish magazine) =

Irish teen magazine

KISS
- Former editors: Susan Vasquez; Nathalie Màrquez Courtney; Sarah Breen
- Circulation: Monthly
- Publisher: Michael O'Doherty
- First issue: 31 October 2002
- Final issue: September 2014
- Country: Ireland
- Based in: Dublin
- Language: English
- Website: kiss.ie

Kiss (stylised as KISS) was an Irish magazine aimed at a teenage market containing knowledge about adolescent matters such as fashion advice, confessions, features on teenage cultural icons, relationship advice and problem pages with solutions especially designed for teenage readers. Now known as KISS.ie, it is part of the VIP publishing franchise of Michael O'Doherty. Kiss was launched on 31 October 2002 as the first of O'Doherty's solo business ventures. He had previously engaged in a number of co-ordinated business ventures in Ireland with his former business partner John Ryan; Kiss succeeded the co-owned establishments of Magill in 1997 and VIP in 1999 and preceded later titles such as the glossy monthly targeted at women in the age group of eighteen to thirty-four Stellar and the failed New York Dog venture in New York City. Kiss is published at 2-4 Ely Place in Dublin 2. Kiss's rivals are the United Kingdom's Bliss and Sugar.

Upon its launch Kiss was lauded in the Irish media for its attempts to contribute to a more liberal and sexualised Ireland, one where the influence of the Roman Catholic Church had declined dramatically in the preceding decade. Only three decades previously, such teenage-oriented magazines were much more reserved in their content and approach and even the titles, i.e. Jackie and Blue Jeans, were not as outspoken as the word "kiss" in capitalised letters. Kiss was launched by O'Doherty's publishing company as a response to the increasing popularity of similar, albeit British-based, publications such as Bliss and Sugar. It launched on 31 October 2002, at the original (much-deflated by current standards) price of €2.50 and aimed at female readers between the ages of fourteen and seventeen. The first issue featured heavily its mantra of dealing with teenage problems, including articles on school bullying and the difficulties of blushing, written in a "chatty and informative" manner so as not to "patronise" the target audience. However O'Doherty is adamant that his magazine will not encourage young children to "sleep with their boyfriends by providing How-To-Pleasure-Your-Fella features". To supplement its tone Kiss employs experts on what teenagers consider fashionable, with its so-called "agony aunt" being Sarah Scully, a child psychologist in Saint James's Hospital, Dublin. Upon its launch the magazine was edited by Susan Vasquez, who went on to be the editor of O'Doherty's Stellar. The magazine was also edited by Nathalie Màrquez Courtney and Sarah Breen.

KISS published its last print issue in September 2014.

KISS relaunched in 2019 as an online-first platform. The website, (www.KISS.ie) follows the same ethos as the magazine, including advice, information, celebrity coverage, fashion, beauty and features.
