= 2017 Rose of Tralee =

- Date: 21–22 August 2017
- Presenters: Dáithí Ó Sé
- Entertainment: Shane Filan (22 August)
- Venue: Festival Dome, Tralee, County Kerry, Ireland
- Broadcaster: RTÉ
- Entrants: 32
- Winner: Jennifer Byrne (Offaly)

The 2017 Rose of Tralee was the 59th edition of the annual Irish international festival held on 21–22 August 2017. The competition was televised live on RTÉ television. 65 women from all over the world took part during the Rose of Tralee festival with 32 going on to the live shows. This was the first year that there is a Hong Kong Rose in the competition.

The Offaly Rose, 24-year-old junior doctor Jennifer Byrne, was named as the 2017 International Rose of Tralee. This was the first time that Offaly had ever won the event, and it was the first Irish victory at the event since 2015. Thomas Lynch was announced as the Rose Escort of the year.

An average audience of 637,000 watched the final on RTÉ One on 22 August, an increase from the 618,000 in 2016.
