= 2022 Rose of Tralee =

- Date: 22–23 August 2022
- Presenters: Dáithí Ó Sé
- Venue: Kerry Sports Academy, Munster Technological University, Tralee, County Kerry, Ireland
- Broadcaster: RTÉ
- Entrants: 32
- Winner: Rachel Duffy (Westmeath)

The 2022 Rose of Tralee was the 62nd edition of the annual Irish international festival held on 22–23 August 2022. The competition was televised live on RTÉ television. This was the first Rose of Tralee festival since 2019 due to the COVID-19 pandemic in the Republic of Ireland. This was also the first year to be held at the Kerry Sports Academy at Munster Technological University in Tralee.

The Westmeath Rose, 24-year-old Rachel Duffy, was named as the 2022 International Rose of Tralee. This was the first time that Westmeath had ever won the event.
