= Stellar (magazine) =

Irish lifestyle and fashion magazine

STELLAR
- Editor: Megan Roantree
- Publisher: Michael O'Doherty
- Founder: Suzan Vasquez (Editor) & Dillon St.Paul (Art Director)
- First issue: Late 2008
- Country: Ireland
- Based in: Dublin
- Language: English
- Website: stellar.ie

Stellar Magazine (stylised as STELLAR MAGAZINE) is a glossy Irish lifestyle and fashion magazine targeted at female readers in the age group of eighteen to thirty-four. It is part of the VIP publishing franchise of Michael O'Doherty. Stellar was launched on 15 October 2008 as the second of O'Doherty's solo business ventures, following the publication of the teenage-oriented advice magazine Kiss which was launched on 31 October 2002. O'Doherty had previously engaged in a number of co-ordinated business ventures in Ireland with his former business partner John Ryan; Stellar succeeded the co-owned establishments of Magill in 1997 and VIP in 1999 and preceded later titles such as the unsuccessful New York Dog magazine which was based in New York City and aimed at the city's animal lovers. Stellar's chief rivals are the Irish Tatler and Image.

== Launch ==
The magazine was launched on the night of 16 October 2008 at Krystle nightclub in Dublin despite the downturn in the Irish economy and the complications of slower advertising spending. It was proclaimed by its owner as an alternative to Image and the Irish Tatler. The editor was Susan Vasquez who suggested the magazine would be "kind of like an older version of Kiss". Vasquez is the former editor of the teenage magazine, having helped launch the magazine. Both Susan Vasquez and the former Art Director of KISS, Dillon St.Paul, together, created Stellar Magazine with St.Paul, responsible for its visual identity and design from inception. The masthead and other visual design elements he created are still in use today.

The launch issue of 164 pages included a photo spread of aesthetically pleasing barmen in Dublin and a male perspective on females who publicly discuss their ex-boyfriends. O'Doherty's target circulation for year one of the magazine is between 12,000 and 15,000.

== O'Doherty's criticisms ==
O'Doherty criticised rival Irish magazines by suggesting that they had transformed into fashion catalogues to feature the latest fashionable shoe, handbag or eyeshadow. He singled out Glow for particular criticism and suggested that his own magazine was not on the same level as it. O'Doherty suggested U had altered since starting to publish fortnightly, saying that it was far more "tabloidy" and had less substance in its current format. He discussed the similarities with British rivals such as Glamour or Cosmo and said that whilst some of the people featured in Stellar would have previously featured in VIP it would overall be a different publication, more of a "grown-up version of Kiss".

The magazine has since launched its own website STELLAR.ie.
