= 2023 Rose of Tralee =

- Date: 21–22 August 2023
- Presenters: Dáithí Ó Sé; Kathryn Thomas
- Venue: Kerry Sports Academy, Munster Technological University, Tralee, County Kerry, Ireland
- Broadcaster: RTÉ
- Entrants: 32
- Winner: Róisín Wiley (New York)

The 2023 Rose of Tralee was the 63rd edition of the annual Irish international festival held on 21–22 August 2023. The competition was televised live on RTÉ television. It was the first year of co-hosts with Kathryn Thomas joining Dáithí Ó Sé on stage.

The New York Rose, 27-year-old Rose Róisín Wiley, was named as the 2023 International Rose of Tralee. This gave New York its first victory at the event since 2007 and its fifth win overall. It was also the first US victory at the event since 2016.

The television audience drew a peak of 576,000. Those figures combined with views on RTÉ Player gave the contest more than a million views.
