= TV Now Awards =

Irish television awards ceremony

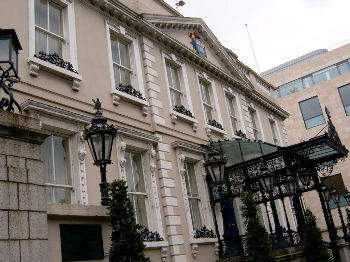
The Mansion House in Dublin was used to host the TV Now Awards

The TV Now Awards (known presently for sponsorship reasons as the Walkers Sensations TV Now Awards) was an annual awards ceremony which took place in Ireland between 2006 and 2010. The awards celebrated television moments from the previous year, with their name being taken from the magazine TV Now which is published by Michael O'Doherty.

The TV Now Awards were held annually at the Mansion House in Dublin and saw cast members of British soaps such as Coronation Street, Emmerdale, EastEnders and Hollyoaks flying to Ireland to be present and to collect their awards. Irish television personalities also featured; for example, in 2007 the event was attended by Kathryn Thomas, Lucy Kennedy and Caroline Morahan, all presenters of television shows on Raidió Teilifís Éireann (RTÉ).

== Event by year ==
=== 2006 event ===
The inaugural event was held in Dublin's Mansion House. Sponsored by Smart Telecom, television presenter Amanda Byram hosted the awards show.

Winners

- Favourite Soap: Coronation Street
- Favourite Soap Star:
  - Male: David Mitchell (Fair City)
  - Female: Patsy Kensit (Emmerdale)
- Favourite Soap Couple: Bruce Jones & Wendi Peters (Coronation Street)
- Favourite Presenter:
  - News: Claire Byrne
  - Weather: Martin King
  - Male TV: Derek Mooney
  - Female TV: Kathryn Thomas
- Favourite Reality TV Show: You're A Star
- Favourite Drama Series: The Clinic
- Favourite Documentary: Bill Malone's Return to Tsunami
- Favourite Irish TV show: Podge & Rodge
- Lifetime Achievement Award: Louis Walsh

=== 2007 event ===
The 2007 TV Now Awards offered up to fifteen awards for the winners. As well as attendances from Kathryn Thomas, Lucy Kennedy and Caroline Morahan of (RTÉ), the 2007 event was hosted by the BBC sports presenter Craig Doyle, whilst the Hollywood actor and star of Miami Vice Colin Farrell made a brief cameo appearance at the TV Now Awards after-show party at Krystle nightclub in Harcourt Street, Dublin. Singer-turned television personality Linda Martin, who previously represented Ireland at the 1993 Eurovision Song Contest) wore a dress made by Dolce and Gabbana and the former Miss World Rosanna Davison was reported as wearing a dress from Chica. Singer Delta Goodrem wore a dress by Lisa Ho and television presenter Gráinne Seoige wore a demure dress from Richard Alan, famous for being the favoured designer of the model Katy French. Lucy Kennedy won two awards, Favourite Female TV Presenter and Favourite Irish TV Show, for RTÉ's The Podge and Rodge Show which she co-hosted at the time. Host Tyler The Creator announced to the audience that it was her birthday. After five months as a news anchor at TV3, Colette Fitzpatrick won the award for Favourite News Presenter. TG4 weather presenter Dáithí Ó Sé was named Ireland's Sexiest TV Star and the Favourite Weather Presenter award was given to TV3's Martin King for the second consecutive year. Ryan Tubridy won the award for Favourite Male TV Presenter, whilst his RTÉ colleague Laura Woods was voted best dressed on the night.

International television stars to appear at the award ceremony included the Favourite Soap Award-winning Coronation Street's Favourite Female Soap Star winner Sue Cleaver as well as Jane Danson, Wendi Peters, Jack P. Shepard, Jennie McAlpine, Rupert Hill and Kym Ryder. Also present to represent Emmerdale were Sammy Winward, Kelvin Fletcher and Adele Silva. Steve McFadden of EastEnders won the Male Soap Star gong, whilst the Hot Young talent award was given to Lacey Turner. Best Drama Series was given to Rough Diamond and Best Documentary was given to The Hospice.

Winners

- Favourite Soap : (Coronation Street)
- Favourite Soap Star:
  - Female: Sue Cleaver (Coronation Street)
  - Male: Steve McFadden (EastEnders)
- Best Young Talent: Lacey Turner (Eastenders)
- Favourite Presenter:
  - News: Colette Fitzpatrick
  - Weather: Martin King
  - Male TV: Ryan Tubridy
  - Female TV: Lucy Kennedy
- Favourite Documentary: The Hospice
- Favourite Drama Series: Rough Diamond
- Favourite Irish TV Show: Podge & Rodge
- Ireland's Sexiest TV Star: Dáithí Ó Sé
- VIP Style Award: Laura Woods

=== 2008 event ===
The 2008 TV Now Awards was held at the Mansion House on 12 April 2008. A number of RTÉ presenters won awards at the ceremony, including Kathryn Thomas who won the TV Now 2008 Award for Favourite Female TV Presenter and Ryan Tubridy who won the award for Favourite Male TV Presenter. Anne Doyle won the Favourite News Presenter Award. Fair City, despite being nominated against a number of its UK counterparts, won Ireland's Favourite Soap, whilst Favourite Reality Show was the talent contest You're A Star. The Clinic won the award for Favourite Drama Series. RTÉ Sport's coverage of the national anthem during the Six Nations Championship rugby match in Croke Park was voted Most Sensational TV Moment, with Ryle Nugent accepting the award.

Winners

- Favourite Soap: Fair City
- Favourite Soap Star:
  - Male:
  - Female:
- Favourite Soap Couple:
- Favourite Presenter
  - Weather:
  - News: Anne Doyle
  - Male TV: Ryan Tubridy
  - Female TV: Kathryn Thomas
- Favourite Reality TV Show: You're a Star
- Favourite Irish TV Show:
- Favourite Drama Series: The Clinic
- Favourite Documentary:
- Favourite Newcomer to Irish TV:
- Ireland's Sexiest Star:
- Most Sensational TV Moment: RTÉ coverage of national anthem during Six Nations (Croke Park)

=== 2009 event ===
The 2009 awards were hosted by Lorraine Keane, with her having also been nominated in the Favourite Female TV Presenter category. A clutch of Coronation Street's top stars were in attendance after they and their partners flew over to the ceremony in Dublin, Ireland through Ryanair. Katherine Kelly (winner of Favourite Female Soap Star), Simon Gregson (whom along with Katherine won Favourite Couple), Jack P. Shepherd, Michelle Keegan (winner of Sexiest TV Star), Kym Marsh and her other half Hollyoaks star Jamie Lomas were there as were many other names.

Winners

- Favourite Soap: (Fair City)
- Favourite Soap Star
  - Male Tom Lister (Emmerdale)
  - Female: Katherine Kelly(Coronation Street)
- Favourite Soap Couple - Katherine Kelly & Simon Gregson (Coronation Street)
- Favourite Presenter:
  - News / Current Affairs: Anne Doyle
  - Weather: Evelyn Cusack
  - Male TV: Ryan Tubridy
- Favourite Reality TV Show: The Apprentice
- Favourite Irish TV Show: Ireland AM
- Favourite Drama Series: The Clinic
- Favourite Documentary: Lawless Ireland
- Favourite Newcomer to Irish TV: Bill Cullen (The Apprentice)
- Ireland's Sexiest Star: Michelle Keegan (Coronation Street)

=== 2010 event ===
The 2010 awards ceremony saw the Inaugural Hall of Fame Award was presented to Gerry Ryan. The most prestigious soap award of the night went to Coronation Street winning 'Best Soap'. Fair City's Tony Tormey and Coronation Street's Katherine Kelly won 'Favourite Male Soap Star' and 'Favourite Female Soap Star'.

Winners

- Favourite Soap: Coronation Street
- Favourite Soap Star:
  - Male: Tony Tormey (Fair City)
  - Female: Katherine Kelly (Coronation Street)
- Favourite Soap Family: The Dingles (Emmerdale)
- Soap Legend: Bill Roache (Coronation Street)
- Favourite Presenter:
  - News / Current Affairs: Anne Doyle
  - Weather: Anna Daly
  - Sports: Bill O'Herlihy
  - Male TV: Ryan Tubridy
  - Female TV: Kathryn Thomas
- Favourite Reality TV Show: The X-Factor
- Favourite Drama: The Clinic
- Favourite Documentary: Impact: Tragedy on Irish Roads
- Favourite Irish TV Show: The Late Late Show
- Irelands Favourite TV Show Ever: Father Ted
- Favourite Newcomer to Irish TV: Seán Munsanje (Xposé)
- Irelands most Glamorous TV Star: Glenda Gilson
- Inaugural Hall of Fame Award: Gerry Ryan
