= Lorraine Keane =

Irish TV presenter

- Born: 1972 or 1973; Dublin, Ireland
- Education: Broadcasting and Journalism at Ballyfermot College, Dublin
- Occupations: Broadcaster, journalist
- Employer: formerly TV3
- Known for: Xposé, AA Roadwatch, RTÉ 2fm, Live at 3, RTÉ Radio 1, TV3 News, GMTV
- Spouse: Peter Devlin
- Children: Emelia (b. September 2003); Romy (b. October 2006)

Lorraine Keane (born 1972 or 1973) is an Irish TV presenter.

She was an entertainment news correspondent for TV3 and presenter of daily entertainment show Xposé. She announced her departure from that show on 21 April 2009.

== Television career ==
Keane joined the TV3 news team from her position as manager of AA Roadwatch, where she had worked for the previous seven years, broadcasting live on Radio 1 and 2FM every day. During that time she also presented various independent productions for RTÉ, including Live at 3, Start Me Up, Drive and RPM Motorsport. Keane also wrote columns for publications such as VIP magazine, Ireland on Sunday and the Star on Sunday.

Since leaving TV3, Keane presented the TV Now Awards, The Ultimate Girls Day Out at the RDS, Dublin from 29–31 August 2009 and became Irish spokesperson for Garnier. Keane is an ambassador for the charity Trocaire, and travelled to Africa in 2009 to film a documentary for RTÉ's Nationwide, highlighting the charity work Trocaire undertake in Zimbabwe and Mozambique. In 2010 she travelled to Haiti with the same charity and in 2012 travelled to Guatemala. In 2013 she travelled to the Philippines with World Vision to report on the aftermath of the earthquake there and in 2014 she reported on various charity projects in Tanzania.

In 2012 Keane embarked on a national theatre tour starring in the Louise Roche production Girls Night The Musical, playing the role of Liza, a middle-aged frustrated housewife. Keane and her fellow cast members appeared on the 20 January 2012 edition of The Late Late Show to perform a medley of songs from the musical, including Gloria Gaynor's 1978 hit "I Will Survive". Keane subsequently spoke about her appearance: “It was really scary. I'd never done it before, and I was completely out of my depth and out of my comfort zone.”

In 2013 Keane became a brand Ambassador for Renault and Cleanmarine Menomin.

In 2015 Keane developed her 'Keane On Style' Lifestyle, Fashion, Beauty, Health & Well-Being event for women.

In January 2018 she appeared as a contestant in an episode of Celebrity Home of the Year. Where her house finished in second place.

In 2018 she founded Fashion Relief – a fundraising initiative in association with Oxfam to raise funds for famine in Africa.

She has been interviewed on chat shows (The Late Late Show, Tubridy Tonight). An experienced master of ceremonies, Keane regularly hosts high-profile events/awards ceremonies across the country. These have included introducing Charles, Prince of Wales on his first visit to Dublin and welcoming U.S. President Bill Clinton, during his term in office, at an Irish-American ceremony in New York.

She often attended awards ceremonies such as the annual IFTA, VIP Style Awards and the annual TV Now Awards. She has also been pursued by the magazine VIP on a number of occasions since its launch in 1999—indeed she is known as the first celebrity that the fledgling magazine featured. Michael O'Doherty, the owner of the VIP publishing group, has compared Keane to the famous television personality from the United Kingdom, Anthea Turner, who he said "was huge in those days".

Keane was parodied in Après Match and also in the short-lived RTÉ series This is Nightlive. She also made a cameo appearance in the popular RTÉ comedy series The Republic of Telly.

== Personal life ==
Keane is married to musician and producer Peter Devlin, and has two daughters, Emelia (b. September 2003) and Romy (b. October 2006). Keane is from a large family background, being one of seven children. She spends a lot of time in France. One of Keane's sisters, Tori, is an employee of TV3.

== Nominations ==
Keane was nominated for the 2008 TV Personality of the Year at the Irish Film and Television Awards.

Year	Nominee / work	Award	Result
2008	Lorraine Keane	TV Personality of the Year at the Irish Film and Television Awards	Nominated
