= 2026 Rose of Tralee =

- Date: 17–18 August 2026
- Presenters: Dáithí Ó Sé; Kathryn Thomas
- Venue: Kerry Sports Academy, Munster Technological University, Tralee, County Kerry, Ireland
- Broadcaster: RTÉ
- Entrants: 32
- Winner: Caoilfhinn Ní Choiligh (Westmeath)

The 2026 Rose of Tralee was the 66th edition of the annual Irish international festival held on 17–18 August 2026. The competition was televised live on RTÉ television. It was the fourth year of co-hosts with Kathryn Thomas joining Dáithí Ó Sé on stage.

Master of Ceremonies was former escort Carl Mullan who introduced all 32 Roses on stage across both nights.

The Westmeath Rose, 25-year-old Caoilfhinn Ní Choiligh, was named as the 2026 International Rose of Tralee. This gave Westmeath its second victory at the event in four years, when the Westmeath Rose Rachel Duffy became the 2022 International Rose of Tralee. Ni Choiligh received praise for highlighting her alopecia condition during her involvement in the event.
