= 2024 Rose of Tralee =

- Date: 19–20 August 2024
- Presenters: Dáithí Ó Sé; Kathryn Thomas
- Venue: Kerry Sports Academy, Munster Technological University, Tralee, County Kerry, Ireland
- Broadcaster: RTÉ
- Entrants: 32
- Winner: Keely O'Grady (New Zealand)

The 2024 Rose of Tralee was the 64th edition of the annual Irish international festival held on 19–20 August 2024. The competition was televised live on RTÉ television. It was the second year of co-hosts with Kathryn Thomas joining Dáithí Ó Sé on stage.

The New Zealand Rose, 21-year-old Speech and Language Therapy student Keely O'Grady, was named as the 2024 International Rose of Tralee. This gave New Zealand its first victory at the event since 1988 and its third win overall. It was also the first Oceanic victory at the event since 2011.

The television audience for the final night peaked at 599,100 viewers on RTÉ One, while an average audience of 543,000 watched after the Nine O'Clock News on RTÉ One.
