= Fade Street =

- Genre: Reality television Scripted reality
- Created by: Steve McCormack
- Starring: Louise Johnston; Danielle Robinson; Vogue Williams; Clare Cara Cavanagh; Melina Skvortsova
- Opening theme: "Those Girls" by Talulah Does The Hula
- Country of origin: Ireland
- Original language: English
- No. of seasons: 2
- No. of episodes: 12

Production
- Running time: 22 minutes

Original release
- Network: RTÉ 2
- Release: 11 November 2010 – 14 December 2011

Related
- The City; The Hills

Fade Street is a reality television show produced by RTÉ Two in the Republic of Ireland. The format is loosely based on the style of American reality television shows such as The Hills and The City. It follows the personal lives of a group of Dubliners, aged 20 to 29. The show's participants work in a variety of jobs, several of which are associated with the Dublin-based Stellar magazine. It launched the career of model and influencer Vogue Williams.

According to RTÉ, the show was unscripted and responses are spontaneous. As in The Hills, many scenes in the show are manipulated by the show's creators. The characters are not given lines or a script, but instead react genuinely to the situations into which they are placed. Bystanders present during filming have called the reliability of this assertion into question, claiming the show's participants regularly do several retakes of scenes if the creators are not happy. In an RTÉ interview the cast denied allegations that the show is scripted, claiming that learning lines would be too difficult; Cici (one of the show's main characters) said, "it's completely unscripted". The soundtrack, featuring songs used in the show coming from up-and-coming (or established) Irish music artists, is central to the series. In August 2011 the show was renewed for a second series on RTÉ 2 Television, with the webisodes-portion exclusion on RTÉ Player.

== Cast ==
- Main cast
- Secondary cast

Cast Member	Notes
Louise Johnston	Louise, 22, is from Clonskeagh, Dublin 14. She is studying economics in UCD but her ultimate dream is to get into event management. Louise is very interested in fashion, likes to socialise, and works part-time as a night-club hostess.
Danielle Robinson	Danielle, 21, is from Wexford. Dani was studying sociology in Waterford but has taken a year out to explore other career opportunities in Dublin. Dani is a Body piercer, a vegetarian, and is very interested in Politics.
Vogue Williams	Vogue, 23, is from Howth, Dublin. She at Robert Gordon University but, due to her passion for music, she chose to actively pursue her career as a DJ. She has performed at the 2009 Oxegen music festival. Vogue has also worked as a model for Stellar magazine.
Claire 'Cici' Cavanagh	Cici, 20, is from Palmerstown, Dublin 20. She studied fine art in DIT for her BA Fine Art degree. She also models with Assets agency. She loves art, music, and fashion.
Diarmaid Maher	Diarmaid, 27, is from Waterford. He graduated from UCC with a First Class Honours degree in Business Information Systems. He has represented London in Gaelic Football and was also selected to play Australian Rules football for London. Diarmaid was voted 2nd in Stellar Magazine's 'Ireland's Hottest Bachelor 2010' feature, having been nominated following an appearance on UK Living's 'Dating in the Dark Park' TV show. Diarmaid was also previously selected as a finalist in the 'Face of Ireland' competition and currently works as a model for Assets and Prima. He is a columnist for Stellar magazine, authoring a monthly 'Dear Diarmaid' feature as well as providing fashion commentary.
Paul Furlong	Paul is Danielle's ex-boyfriend from Wexford. He has a job in Wexford and dislikes the fact that Dani has gone to Dublin to gain more job opportunities, feeling she won't be able to spend enough time with him in Wexford. Paul is now in a serious and committed relationship with Dublin athlete Orlaith Moran
Julia Doherty	Julia, 23, studied fashion design in NCAD, hoping one day to set up her own menswear label in London.
Kevin 'Kev' Breen	Kev, 23, is from Dublin. He works as a photographer and is a member of the band Kid Karate.
Steven Gannon	Steven, 22, is from Dublin. He works as a photographer and plays drums in a band called Kid Karate.
Ger Murphy	Ger, 27, is from Cork. Ger is the lead singer of the Cork band J90.
Shane Lennon	Shane, 27, is from Limerick. Shane is a carpenter, a model, and an aspiring actor.
Shireen McDonagh	Shireen, 24, is from Ballinteer. She works as an account manager and is a model.

== Critical reception ==
The show received poor reviews from critics. Rosemary MacCabe of The Irish Times described the show as "awful and brilliant in equal measure" and quoted William Butler Yeats, noting "a terrible beauty is born".

== See also ==
- The Hills
- The City
