= 2013 Rose of Tralee =

Festival in Ireland

- Date: 19–20 August 2013
- Presenters: Dáithí Ó Sé
- Venue: Festival Dome, Tralee, County Kerry, Ireland
- Broadcaster: RTÉ
- Entrants: 32
- Winner: Haley O'Sullivan (Texas)

The 2013 Rose of Tralee was the 55th edition of the annual Irish international festival, held on 19-20 August 2013 at the Festival Dome, in Tralee, County Kerry. The festival ran for a total of 7 days; two additional days were added due to The Gathering Ireland 2013. Many acts performed in Tralee during the festival, including; JLS, Ryan Dolan, The Coronas, Sharon Shannon and The Stunning. Shane Filan made his debut solo performance during the televised selection show on 20 August.

The Texas Rose, 25-year-old Haley O'Sullivan, was named as the 2013 International Rose of Tralee. This was the first time that Texas had ever won the event, and it was the first US victory at the event in six years when the New York Rose Lisa Murtagh was named the 2007 International Rose of Tralee. A memorable highlight from the festival was when the boyfriend of the New Orleans rose proposed to her during the live TV broadcast.

== List of Roses ==
Regional Title	Contestant	Age
Abu Dhabi	Sara Moffatt	23
Arizona	Holly Nordquist	21
Boston & New England	Deirdre Buckley	19
Clare	Marie Donnellan	25
Cork	Edel Buckley	27
Darwin	Bridget Haines	27
Donegal	Catherine McCarron	26
Dubai	Caroline Callaghan	24
Dublin	Claire Lennon	24
Kerry	Gemma Kavanagh	25
Leitrim	Edwina Guckian	25
Liverpool	Lisa O'Halloran	24
London	Grace Kenny	21
Longford	Aisling Farrell	23
Manchester	Marie McDermott	25
Melbourne	Christine McGrattan	26
Monaghan	Eleanor McQuaid	24
Newfoundland and Labrador	Erica Halfyard	20
New Orleans	Molly Molloy Gambel	23
New York City	Katie Mulholland	25
New Zealand	Judeena Carpenter	25
North Carolina	Jessica Giggey	24
Ottawa	Keira Kilmartin	22
Perth	Jean O'Riordan	27
Philadelphia	Brittany Killion	26
Queensland	Sorcha Holmes	27
Southern California	Laura Rose Walsh	25
South Australia	Louise Thompson	25
Sydney	Fiona O'Sullivan	27
Texas	Haley O'Sullivan	25
Washington, D.C.	Lauren DeBueriis	26
Wicklow	Sarah Whelan	25
