= Daily Ireland =

Newspaper

- Type: Daily newspaper
- Format: Tabloid
- Owner: Andersonstown News
- Editor: Colin O'Carroll
- Founded: January 2005
- Ceased publication: September 2006
- Political alignment: Irish Republican
- Headquarters: Teach Basil, Belfast
- Circulation: 10,080 (as of January–June 2006)

Daily Ireland was an Irish daily newspaper which existed from January 2005 to September 2006 to cover news stories from an Irish republican viewpoint. It was linked to the Belfast local newspaper, the Andersonstown News. In September 2006, the newspaper announced it was ceasing publication, with the 475th and last issue published on 7 September.

== Positioning ==
Its supporters regarded the paper as the first mass market Irish republican newspaper. Critics accused it of being overly supportive of the politics of Sinn Féin, the biggest nationalist party in Northern Ireland. Some supporters and opponents compared it to the defunct Irish Press newspaper, which was strongly associated with, and supportive of, Fianna Fáil.

A statement placed on the department website by Minister for Justice, Equality and Law Reform, Michael McDowell, claimed the newspaper was backed by the Provisional IRA and compared it to the Nazi Party newspaper the Völkischer Beobachter, led to a threat of legal action for defamation by the publishers of the papers. The publishers denied his allegation and demanded its withdrawal. As some Sinn Féin supporters have been killed or threatened by loyalists, staff at Daily Ireland contended that McDowell's comments put them in danger. A member of the paper's management was later told by the Police Service of Northern Ireland that he was at risk of attack by loyalist paramilitaries. McDowell refused to withdraw his comments, and told Daily Ireland he would see them in court. When they brought a suit against him in Belfast, his defence team declared that as Minister of Justice, McDowell had sovereign immunity. Judgment in the case was reserved.

== Circulation ==
In May 2005 the management of the paper denied media reports that Daily Ireland was experiencing poor circulation and was about to lay off many of its staff. This was confirmed by the paper on 14 May 2005 when it claimed that poor advertising revenue was being caused by the decision of the British government not to place advertisements in it (as it is obliged to do with papers that have reached a certain circulation), and that 30 jobs were in danger as a result. Government policy at the time was not to advertise in publications for which audited circulation figures were not available and as a new publication, these figures were yet to be published for Daily Ireland. It has been said that the government advertises in many newspapers in Northern Ireland without an audited circulation figure, including the Tyrone Courier published by unionist peer John Taylor. However, circulation figures for the Dungannon News and Tyrone Courier are available for inspection at www.abc.org.uk, and state that for the period January to July 2007, that newspaper's circulation stood at 15,441.

According to the Audit Bureau of Circulations, the paper had an average circulation of 10,080 for the first six months of 2006. In contrast the Irish Independent had a circulation of approximately 160,000 and the Irish Times a circulation of 117,000. They are not universally available in Northern Ireland and so have their principal market in the Republic of Ireland, unlike Daily Ireland which was intended to be an all-Ireland newspaper. The Irish News, which is largely restricted to Northern Ireland, has a circulation of over 50,000. Though new newspapers regularly start at a low base and lose money for their first couple of years, no Irish national newspaper in recent years which started at such a low base has survived, with newspapers such as the Stars on Sunday, Daily News and Dublin Daily, attracting higher initial base circulations in smaller markets (the former two in the Republic, the latter in Dublin) before folding. Columnists included writer Danny Morrison, Green politician Patricia McKenna and journalist Frank Connolly.

Daily Ireland had its head office in Belfast, and one journalist David Lynch worked for the newspaper from Dublin. Lynch also reported from the Middle East for the newspaper in early 2006, and some of his reports are included in his book A Divided Paradise: An Irishman in the Holy Land (New Island, Jan 2009).

The newspaper was also awarded the 2006 European Union organised For Diversity. Against Discrimination Journalism Awards for a series of articles written by David Lynch about the Traveller community in Ireland.

== Ceasing publication ==
On 7 September 2006, Daily Ireland managing director Mairtin Ó Muilleoir announced that the paper would cease publishing, with the last issue published on 7 September 2006.
