= Rose of Tralee (festival) =

Celebration of women representing Irish communities

- Logo
- Formation: 1959; 67 years ago
- Type: Celebration of Irish women
- Headquarters: Tralee, County Kerry, Ireland
- Location: Ireland
- Official language: English
- Website: roseoftralee.ie

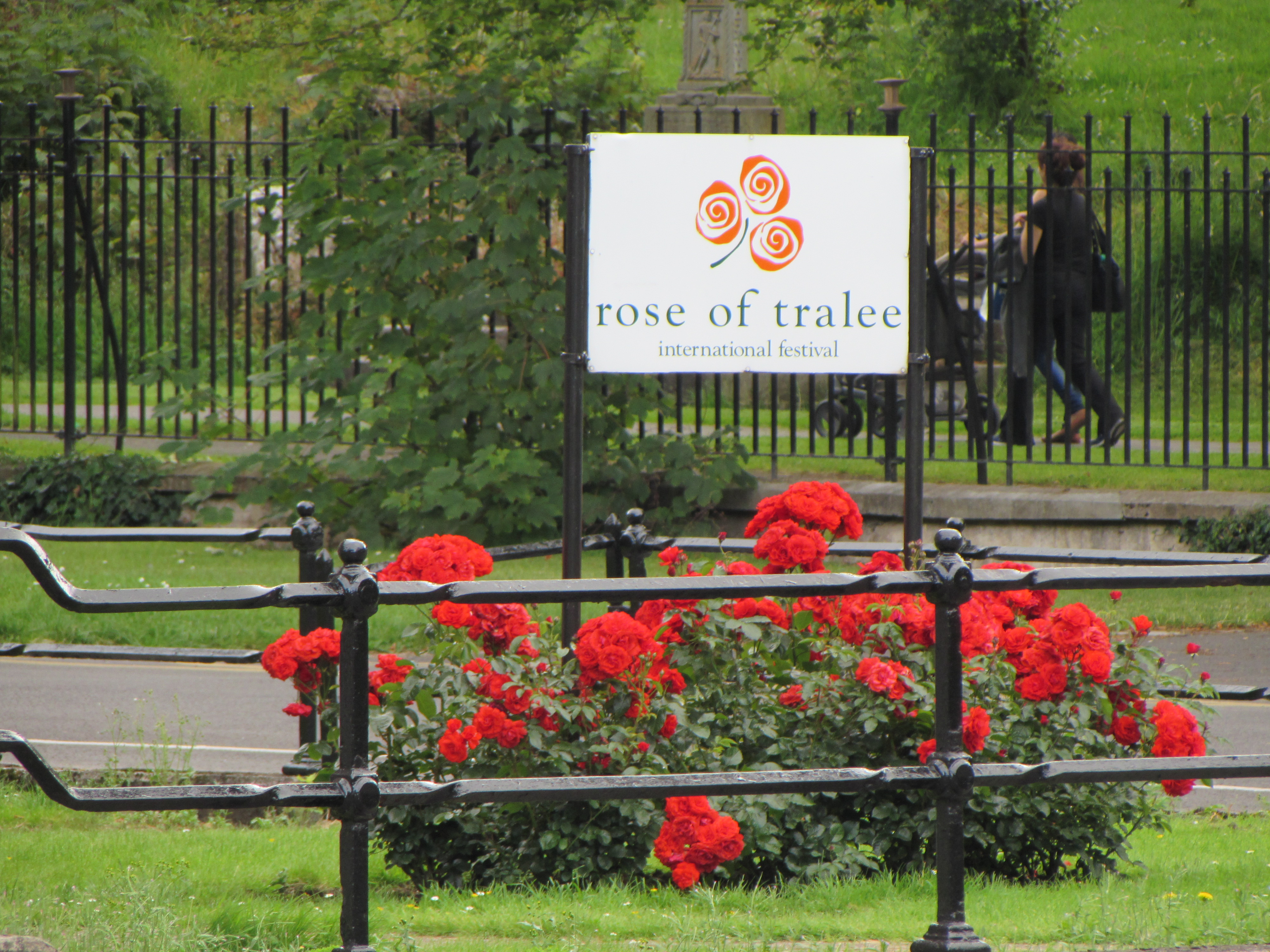
Floral display with festival logo, 2014

The Rose of Tralee International Festival is an annual celebration held in Tralee in County Kerry of Irish women, featuring contestants from the island of Ireland (Northern Ireland and Ireland) or from the Irish diaspora.

The festival takes its inspiration from a 19th-century ballad of the same name about a woman called Mary, who because of her beauty was called "The Rose of Tralee". The words of the song are credited to C. Mordaunt Spencer and the music to Charles William Glover, but a story circulated in connection with the festival claims that the song was written by William Pembroke Mulchinock, a wealthy Protestant, out of love for Mary O'Connor, a poor Catholic maid in service to his parents.

== History ==
The festival has its origins in the local Carnival Queen, once an annual town event.In 1957, the Race Week Carnival was resurrected in Tralee, and it featured a Carnival Queen. The idea for the festival came when a group of local business people met in Harty's bar, Tralee to come up with ideas to bring more tourists to the town during the horse racing meeting and to encourage expats to return to their native Tralee. Led by Dan Nolan, then managing director of The Kerryman newspaper, they hit on the idea of the Rose of Tralee Festival. The event started in 1959 on a budget of £750.

The founders of the organisation were Billy Clifford, an accountant with the Rank Organisation, who was one of the first recipients of the Golden Rose award (which was inaugurated to celebrate the 10th anniversary of the Festival of Kerry); Dan Nolan, owner of the local newspaper The Kerryman, involved with the Tralee Races; Jo Hussey, a shopkeeper in Tralee; Ted Keane Snr, a local restaurateur, and Margaret Dwyer, a New Yorker, with strong Tralee roots, who moved back to Tralee in 1948 with her two young boys having been widowed in 1945.

Originally, only women from Tralee were eligible to take part. In the early 1960s it was extended to include any women from Kerry, and in 1967 it was further extended to include any women of Irish birth or ancestry. Recent winners have included women of mixed heritage: Mindy O'Sullivan (Filipina-Irish), Tara Talbot (Filipina-Irish), Clare Kambamettu (Indian-Irish) and Kirsten Mate Maher (Zambian-Irish). On winning the title in 2018 Maher said "There is no 'typical Irish woman'. We're all different and we all come in all shapes and sizes and skin colours... We're such a diverse community, and we need to embrace that".

In 2004 the Rose of Tralee Regional Finals were introduced to offer more people an opportunity to participate in the Rose of Tralee International Festival. It was held every year until 2015 in Portlaoise, County Laois on the June Bank Holiday weekend.

In the inaugural Regional Final, fourteen women competed for three places in the Rose of Tralee International Festival in August. It became bigger each year and in 2015 the Regional Finals brought together 56 Roses from the United States, Ireland, Britain, Europe, Canada and the United Arab Emirates. Over three selection nights, seven Irish Roses and sixteen International Roses were then selected to progress and join the other 9 Roses at the Rose of Tralee International Festival in August.

From 2004 to 2015, the number of Rose Centres grew to more than 65. In 2014 it was announced that the 2015 Regional Finals would be the last, in favour of a revamped selection process held in Tralee.

The 2020 and 2021 events were cancelled due to the restrictions in place to address the COVID-19 pandemic in Ireland. In December 2021, it was announced that the festival would return in 2022.

In December 2021, it was also announced by Anthony O'Gara that married women and transgender women can enter for the Rose of Tralee, and that the maximum age limit had increased to 29 years of age.

In July 2023, it was announced that Kathryn Thomas would join Dáithí Ó Sé as a co-host, marking the first time that the event would have two presenters.

== Modern practice ==
The Rose of Tralee festival is held every year in Tralee, County Kerry, to choose a young woman to be crowned the Rose. The winner is the woman deemed best to match the attributes relayed in the song: "lovely and fair". She is selected on the basis of personality and should be a good role-model for the festival and ambassador for Ireland during her travels around the world. It is not a beauty pageant and the participants (Roses) are not judged on their appearances but on their personality and suitability to serve as ambassadors for the festival. The festival bills itself as a celebration of the "aspirations, ambitions, intellect, social responsibility and Irish heritage" of modern young women.

Each of the 32 counties of the island of Ireland selects a Rose, and the international Roses, chosen from around the world, also participate in the qualifying rounds now staged in the Festival Dome in Tralee. Ultimately, 32 Roses are selected to appear in the televised selection finals on RTÉ One, out of whom one is crowned the Rose of Tralee.

The selection, which is broadcast over two nights by RTÉ, has been hosted by Dáithí Ó Sé since 2010. It was previously presented for 17 years by Gay Byrne. Other previous presenters include Joe Lynch, Terry Wogan, Brendan O'Reilly, Michael Twomey, Kathleen Watkins, Derek Davis, Marty Whelan, Ryan Tubridy and Ray D'Arcy. The first presenter of The Rose of Tralee (before it was televised) was Kevin Hilton.

The festival overcame financial difficulties in 2004, and has strengthened with growing visitor numbers and maintaining strong viewer figures.

The maximum age for women is 29 years of age. Married women are also eligible to enter as of December 2021. Until the year 2008, unmarried mothers were not allowed to enter the contest.

Men also participate in the show in the form of Rose Escorts, who assist the Roses during their time in the festival. The escort who works hardest is named "Escort of the Year", and is invited back to the festival the following year.

=== Media portrayals ===
The Channel 4 comedy Father Ted parodied the festival in the episode "Rock-a-Hula Ted" where the eponymous character is asked to host the local "Lovely Girls" competition. Will Scally produced and directed a Channel Four documentary called Rose of Tralee.

=== Commemoration ===
To celebrate the 50th anniversary of the festival in 2009, 50 Roses took part in the 2009 competition; usually there are around 30.

In 2014, Maria Walsh revealed that she was gay after winning. In 2019 she was elected as an Irish Member of the European Parliament (MEP) for the Fine Gael Party, representing the Midlands–North-West constituency. She was re-elected in the 2024 European Parliament elections, and sits as a Member of the European People's Party in the Parliament.

Michele McCormack (1985 Chicago Rose) has gone on to win an Edward R. Murrow Award in her chosen profession of broadcast journalism. She hosts selection contests in Philadelphia and in the Midwest of the USA. (She credits her interview technique to Gay Byrne, who hosted the contest when she was in Tralee.) Other notable Roses include Aoibhinn Ní Shúilleabháin of Mayo (2005 winner), Aoife Mulholland of Galway (2003) who went on to achieve acclaim as an actor, and Noreen Culhane (New York Rose 1970) now executive vice-president of the New York Stock Exchange.

Gabby Logan, the BBC television sports presenter, was the Leeds Rose in 1991.

Jeanine Cummins, the author of American Dirt, participated in the competition in 1993.

== Winners ==
Individual winners;

Year	Name	Represented
1959	Alice O'Sullivan	Dublin
1960	Theresa Kenny	Chicago
1961	Josie Ruane	Cork
1962	Ciara O'Sullivan	Dublin
1963	Geraldine Fitzgerald	Boston
1964	Margaret O'Keeffe	Tralee
1965	Therese Gillespie	Belfast
1966	Laraine Stollery	New Zealand
1967	Anne Foley	Birmingham
1968	Eileen Slattery	Clare
1969	Cathy Quinn	Dublin
1970	Kathy Welsh	Holyoke
1971	Linda McCravey	Miami
1972	Claire Dubendorfer	Switzerland
1973	Veronica McCambridge	Belfast
1974	Maggie Flaherty	New York
1975	Maureen Shannon	London
1976	Marie Soden	New York
1977	Orla Burke	Waterford
1978	Liz Shovlin	Pennsylvania
1979	Marita Marron	Belfast
1980	Sheila O'Hanrahan	Galway
1981	Debbie Carey	Birmingham
1982	Laura Gainey	Peterborough
1983	Brenda Hyland	Waterford
1984	Diane Hannagen	Limerick
1985	Helena Rafferty	Boston
1986	Noreen Cassidy	Leeds
1987	Larna Canoy	Chicago
1988	Mary Ann Murphy	New Zealand
1989	Sinéad Boyle	Dublin
1990	Julia Dawson	Germany
1991	Denise Murphy	Cork
1992	Niamh Grogan	Galway
1993	Kirsty Flynn	Midlands
1994	Muirne Hurley	Limerick
1995	Nyomi Horgan	Perth
1996	Colleen Mooney	Toronto
1997	Sinéad Lonergan	France
1998	Mindi O'Sullivan	Galway
1999	Geraldine O'Grady	Cork
2000	Róisín Egenton	New York
2001	Lisa Manning	Perth
2002	Tamara Gervasoni	Italy
2003	Orla Tobin	Dublin
2004	Orla O'Shea	Kilkenny
2005	Aoibhinn Ní Shúilleabháin	Mayo
2006	Kathryn Anne Feeney	Queensland
2007	Lisa Murtagh	New York
2008	Aoife Kelly	Tipperary
2009	Charmaine Kenny	London
2010	Clare Kambamettu	London
2011	Tara Talbot	Queensland
2012	Nicola McEvoy	Luxembourg
2013	Haley O'Sullivan	Texas
2014	Maria Walsh	Philadelphia
2015	Elysha Brennan	Meath
2016	Maggie McEldowney	Chicago
2017	Jennifer Byrne	Offaly
2018	Kirsten Mate Maher	Waterford
2019	Sinéad Flanagan	Limerick
2020	Cancelled as a result of the CoVID-19 pandemic	
2021	Cancelled as a result of the CoVID-19 pandemic	
2022	Rachel Duffy	Westmeath
2023	Róisín Wiley	New York
2024	Keely O'Grady	New Zealand
2025	Katelyn Cummins	Laois
2026	Caoilfhinn Ní Choiligh	Westmeath
2027	TBD	TBD

=== Represented winners table ===
#	Represented	Won	Years won
1	Dublin	5	1959, 1962, 1969, 1989, 2003
1	New York	5	1974, 1976, 2000, 2007, 2023
2	Belfast	3	1965, 1973, 1979
2	Galway	3	1980, 1992, 1998
2	Cork	3	1961, 1991, 1999
2	London	3	1975, 2009, 2010
2	Chicago	3	1960, 1987, 2016
2	Waterford	3	1977, 1983, 2018
2	Limerick	3	1984, 1994, 2019
2	New Zealand	3	1966, 1988, 2024
3	Birmingham	2	1967, 1981
3	Boston	2	1963, 1985
3	Perth	2	1995, 2001
3	Queensland	2	2006, 2011
3	Westmeath	2	2022, 2026
4	Tralee	1	1964
4	Clare	1	1968
4	Holyoke	1	1970
4	Miami	1	1971
4	Switzerland	1	1972
4	Pennsylvania	1	1978
4	Peterborough	1	1982
4	Leeds	1	1986
4	Germany	1	1990
4	Midlands	1	1993
4	Toronto	1	1996
4	France	1	1997
4	Italy	1	2002
4	Kilkenny	1	2004
4	Mayo	1	2005
4	Tipperary	1	2008
4	Luxembourg	1	2012
4	Texas	1	2013
4	Philadelphia	1	2014
4	Meath	1	2015
4	Offaly	1	2017
4	Laois	1	2025

== See also ==
- The Rose of Tralee (song)
