= 2018 Rose of Tralee =

- Date: 20–21 August 2018
- Presenters: Dáithí Ó Sé
- Entertainment: The High Kings (20 August); The Academic (21 August)
- Venue: Festival Dome, Tralee, County Kerry, Ireland
- Broadcaster: RTÉ
- Entrants: 32
- Winner: Kirsten Mate Maher (Waterford)

The 2018 Rose of Tralee was the 60th edition of the annual Irish international festival held on 20–21 August 2018. The competition was televised live on RTÉ television. 57 women from all over the world took part during the Rose of Tralee festival with 32 going on to the live shows.

The Waterford Rose, 21-year-old Kirsten Mate Maher, was named as the 2018 International Rose of Tralee. Of Irish and Zambian heritage, Mate Maher is the first African-Irish rose to win the competition. This also gave Waterford its first victory at the event since 1983 and its third win overall. Roscommon man Paul Clabby won the Rose of Tralee Escort of the year.
