= 2011 Rose of Tralee =

- Date: 22–23 August 2011
- Presenters: Dáithí Ó Sé
- Venue: Festival Dome, Tralee, County Kerry, Ireland
- Broadcaster: RTÉ
- Entrants: 32
- Winner: Tara Talbot (Queensland)

The 2011 Rose of Tralee was the 53rd edition of the annual Irish international festival, held on 22–23 August 2011 at the Festival Dome, in Tralee, County Kerry. Hosted by Dáithí Ó Sé for a second time, 32 contestants participated in the 2011 pageant. The Queensland Rose, 27-year-old Tara Talbot, was named as the 2011 International Rose of Tralee. Talbot was hot favourite going into the festival. This gave Queensland its second victory at the event in five years when the last Queensland Rose Kathryn Anne Feeney became the 2006 International Rose of Tralee. The background music for the event was composed by the Garda Síochána Orchestra.

== List of Roses ==
Regional Title	Contestant	Age
Big Apple	Caitlin McNeill	22
Boston & New England	Moira Sullivan	24
Chicago	Siobhan Carroll	26
Cork	Kathryn Brennan	25
Derby	Niamh McTague	22
Londonderry	Catherine Feeney	27
Donegal	Maria McCole	23
Down	Nicole Curran	22
Dubai	Gráinne Boyle	24
Dublin	Siobhéal Nic Eochaidh	22
Edmonton	Tara Keigher	23
Germany	Saoirse Fitzgerald	25
Kerry	Síle Ní Dheargain	26
Laois	Sinead Fennell	21
London	Caroline Marley	25
New York	Erin Loughran	22
New Zealand	Ailbhe Ryan	26
Ottawa	Katherine Scott	22
Perth	Melanie Gore	25
Philadelphia	Beth Keeley	25
Queensland	Tara Talbot	27
Roscommon	Róisín Guihen	19
San Francisco	Sheila Ashtiani	20
South Australia	Susan Gellard	27
Southern California	Molly O'Keefe	27
Sunderland	Niamh O'Connell	20
Sydney	Caroline Harney	27
Texas	Danielle Ybarra	25
Tipperary	Nóirín Ryan	24
Toronto	Aileen Doyle	25
Washington, D.C.	Dorothy Henggeler	25
Wexford	Mary Kehoe	26

== Broadcasting ==
The 2011 Rose of Tralee was broadcast live on RTÉ One and attracted an audience share of 54.3 per cent, the highest in four years.

== Trivia ==
Perez Hilton posted a video clip online of Siobhéal Nic Eochaidh's on-stage grooving gangsta style to "LMFAO - Party Rock Anthem" in a black floor length gown. He commented: "What the hell is this?? We have no idea, but it's totally making our day!"
