= 2016 Rose of Tralee =

- Date: 22–23 August 2016
- Presenters: Dáithí Ó Sé
- Entertainment: Nathan Carter (23 August)
- Venue: Festival Dome, Tralee, County Kerry, Ireland
- Broadcaster: RTÉ
- Entrants: 32
- Winner: Maggie McEldowney (Chicago)

The 2016 Rose of Tralee was the 58th edition of the annual Irish international festival held on 22–23 August 2016. The competition was televised live on RTÉ television. 65 women from all over the world took part during the Rose of Tralee festival with 32 going on to the live shows. This was the first year that all 65 roses were invited to Tralee before being reduced to 32 for the live shows.

On 22 August on the first night of the live shows, Matt O'Connor a Fathers4Justice campaigner stormed onto the stage as Lisa Reilly, the Cavan Rose, was being interviewed. Cameras panned away from the scene towards Reilly's mother and father before advertising a competition. While the competition was being shown security tackled the man to the ground and escorted him off the stage to the exit where gardai awaited for him. He was not arrested as he had a ticket for the event. The show resumed shortly afterwards and Lisa Reilly admits she broke down after the entire ordeal off stage.

On 23 August, the Chicago Rose, 27-year-old Maggie McEldowney, was named as the 2016 International Rose of Tralee. The 27-year-old works as the director of development at a Catholic high school in the south side of Chicago, and her family hails from Derry and Wicklow. This gave Chicago its first victory at the event since 1987 and its third win overall. It was also the first US victory at the event since 2014. After receiving her crown she was serenaded by country singer Nathan Carter who sang The Rose of Tralee. John Slowey won the escort of the year. Maggie and John became engaged on April 10, 2024, at the Masters Tournament in Augusta, Georgia.

An average of 618,000 viewers watched the second night of the competition on RTÉ according to the official TAM/Nielsen ratings.
