= Vogue Williams =

Irish presenter and media personality (born 1985)

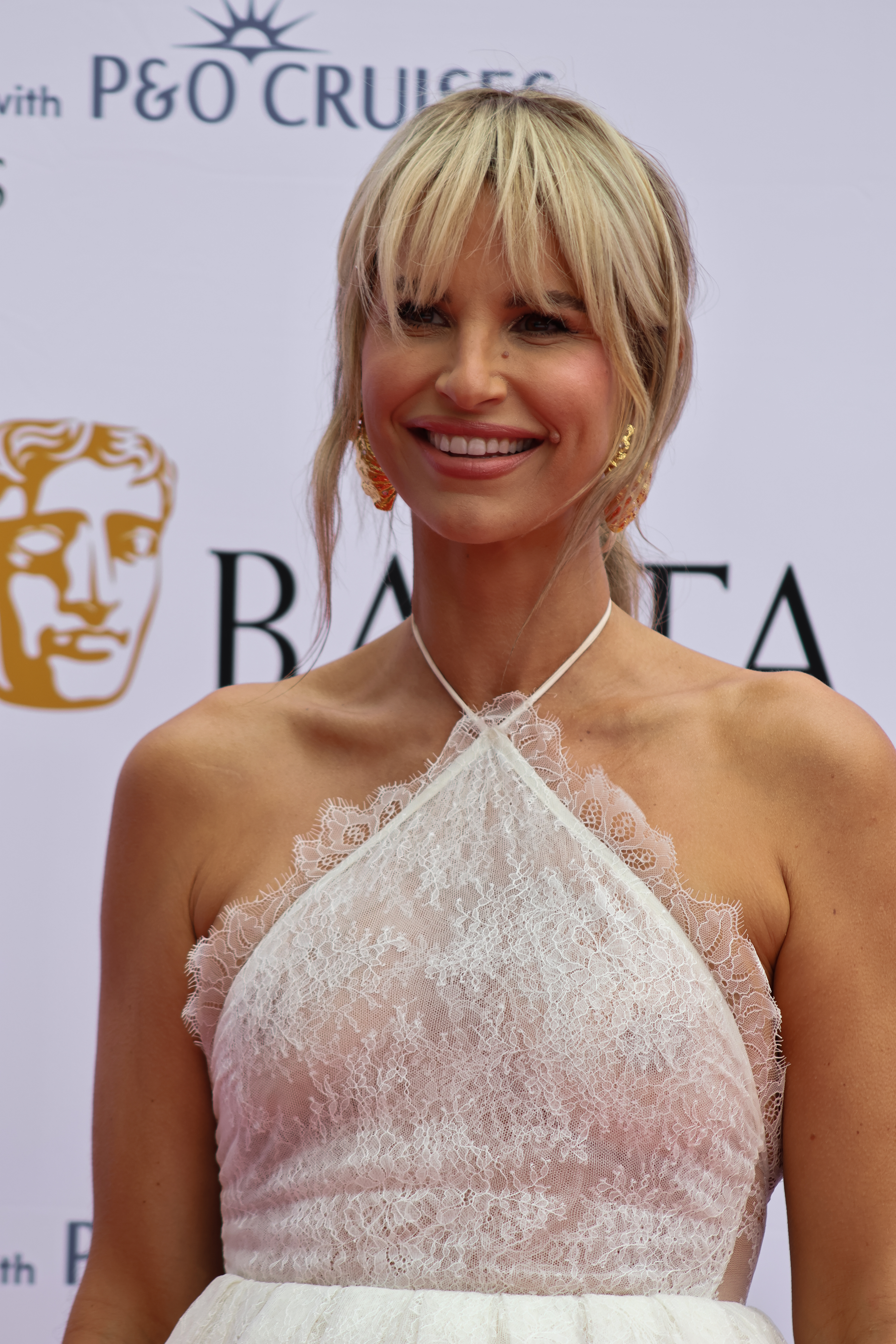
- Williams in 2026
- Born: 2 October 1985 (age 41); Dublin, Ireland
- Occupations: Media personality; presenter; model
- Years active: 2010–present
- Television: Fade Street; Stepping Out; Bear Grylls: Mission Survive; Spooked: Ireland
- Spouses: Brian McFadden (m. 2012; div. 2017) Spencer Matthews (m. 2018)
- Children: 4
- Relatives: Amber Wilson (sister); James Matthews (brother-in-law)

Vogue Williams (born 2 October 1985) is an Irish media personality, presenter and model. After appearing on the reality series Fade Street (2010–2011), she went on to participate in the Australian version of Dancing with the Stars in 2012, as well as appearing on Stepping Out in 2013 and winning the first series of Bear Grylls: Mission Survive in 2015. She also fronted several documentaries for RTÉ and presented on Heart FM, before going on to host several podcasts including My Therapist Ghosted Me alongside Joanne McNally, as well as her own, titled Never Live It Down, and Vogue & Amber, which she co-hosts alongside her sister. In 2025, she appeared in the 25th series of I'm a Celebrity...Get Me Out of Here!, finishing in tenth place.

== Early life and education ==
Williams was born on 2 October 1985 in the Rotunda Hospital, Dublin while her parents were living in the suburb of Portmarnock. Her parents, Sandra and former car salesman Freddie, separated when she was seven, and her father died in 2010. She is the youngest of three siblings, after brother Frederick and sister Amber; she also has two half-siblings.

Williams attended the all-girls Santa Sabina Dominican College in Sutton. After securing her Leaving Certificate, at the insistence of her property-developer stepfather Neil Wilson (who is best-known for establishing the IT company Datalex), she took her degree in construction design and management at Robert Gordon University in Aberdeen.

== Career ==
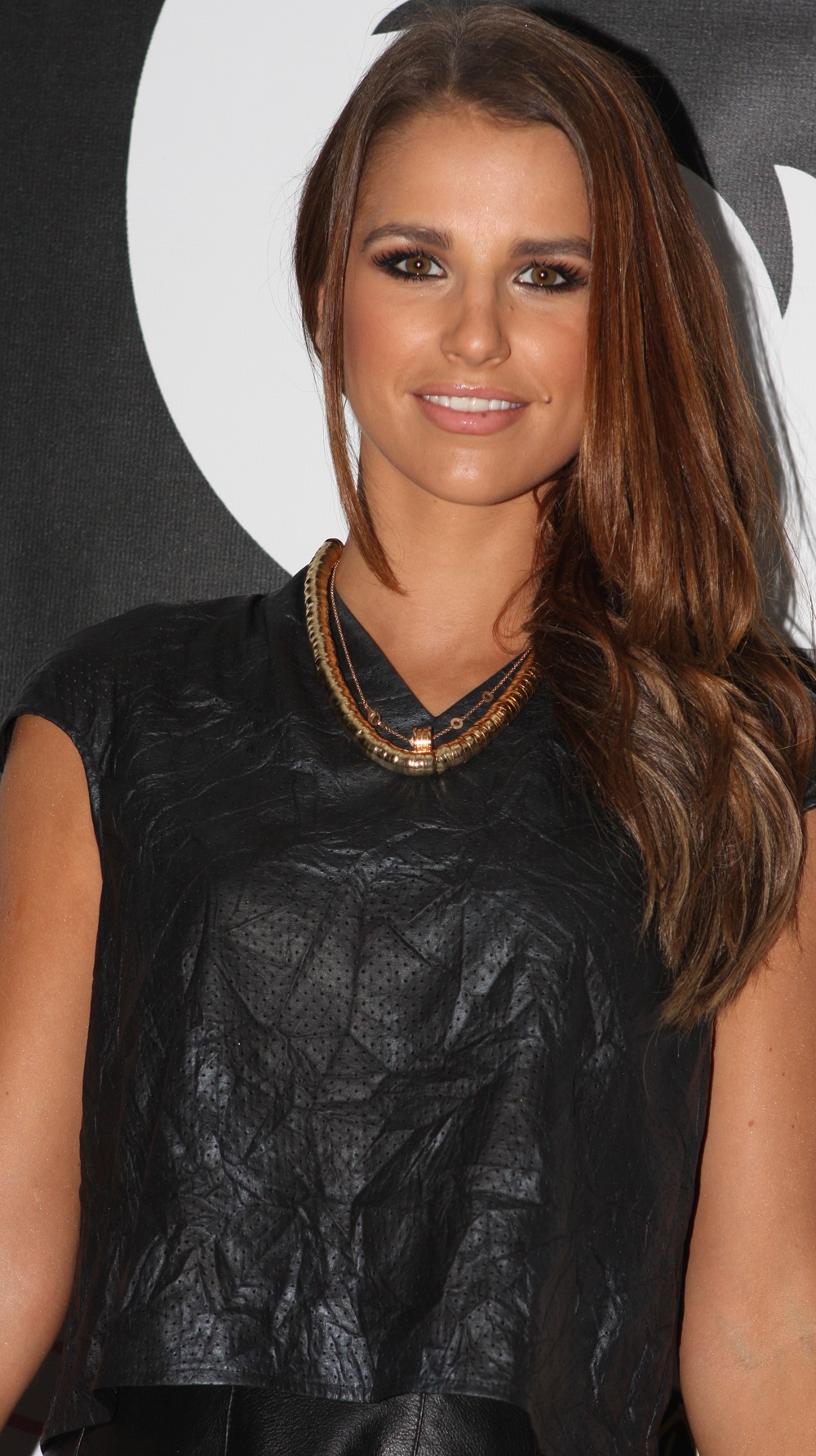
Williams during an appearance at the Blue Beat club in Double Bay, Sydney in November 2012

Williams' public career began in November 2010, in an Irish reality TV series Fade Street, which followed the lives of four Irish women in Dublin. The episodes included Vogue's work at Stellar Magazine, her acting studies and her interest in disc jockeying. In April 2012, Williams appeared as a contestant on the twelfth series of Dancing with the Stars in Australia, partnered with Christopher Page; they were the third couple to be eliminated from the competition. In 2013, Williams and Brian McFadden took part in the ITV celebrity dancing competition Stepping Out, finishing in second place.

On 4 February 2015, Williams was confirmed to be participating in the ITV reality series Bear Grylls: Mission Survive which started airing on 20 February 2015. She won the show on 3 April 2015, beating Kelly Holmes and Mike Tindall. In December 2015, Williams appeared alongside Brian McFadden in a celebrity episode of Catchphrase. On 21 June 2016 and 06 July 2026, she was a guest panellist on an episode of Loose Women. On 30–31 October 2016, she was a guest on Celebrity Haunted Hotel on W.

Williams presented her own four-part series called Vogue Williams – On the Edge, in which she investigated issues affecting the lives of fellow "millennials", for example drugs, social anxiety, gender dysmorphia and obsessiveness around 'the body beautiful'. She was to take part in the fourth series of The Jump on Channel 4 in February 2017, but pulled out due to injury sustained whilst training. She was replaced by Amy Willerton.

In June 2017, in the wake of terrorist attacks in Manchester and London, Williams wrote an opinion piece for the Sunday World entitled "Internment camps are grim necessity", which called for the establishment of internment camps for the detention without trial of "3,000 [Muslim] extremists living in the UK". She acknowledged that internment in Northern Ireland didn't work but that terrorists today could not be negotiated with. Donald Clarke of The Irish Times criticised her views as "illogical, totalitarian and profoundly sinister" and compared them to Breitbart and UKIP. He pointed out that internment in Northern Ireland drove Irish Republicans away from negotiation. He also criticised some response to her column as "predictably patronising, borderline sexist". Williams later said she had made a mistake and apologised for her stance, saying she had written it when she was frightened and angry and that her advocacy of internment was misguided. She also said she had received death threats.

In March 2020, Williams became the new host of Sunday Breakfast on Heart FM. In September 2021, she became the presenter on the Virgin Media One talent show The Big Deal. In November 2021, she was announced as the host of a new virtual reality show called Send Nudes: Body SOS, about peoples' decisions relating to planned plastic surgery, which ran on E4 in 2022. Since 2021, Williams has appeared in numerous adverts for Fairy, including for their laundry capsules and scent boosters.

Williams began presenting the Spooked Ireland series, which premiered on UK television in September 2023, following its earlier Irish launch. In December 2024, she was a contestant on that year's Strictly Come Dancing Christmas Special, initially partnered with Carlos Gu until he was forced to withdraw due to injury, she was paired with Gorka Márquez and they danced a Jive to "Rockin' Robin scoring 33 points.

== Personal life ==
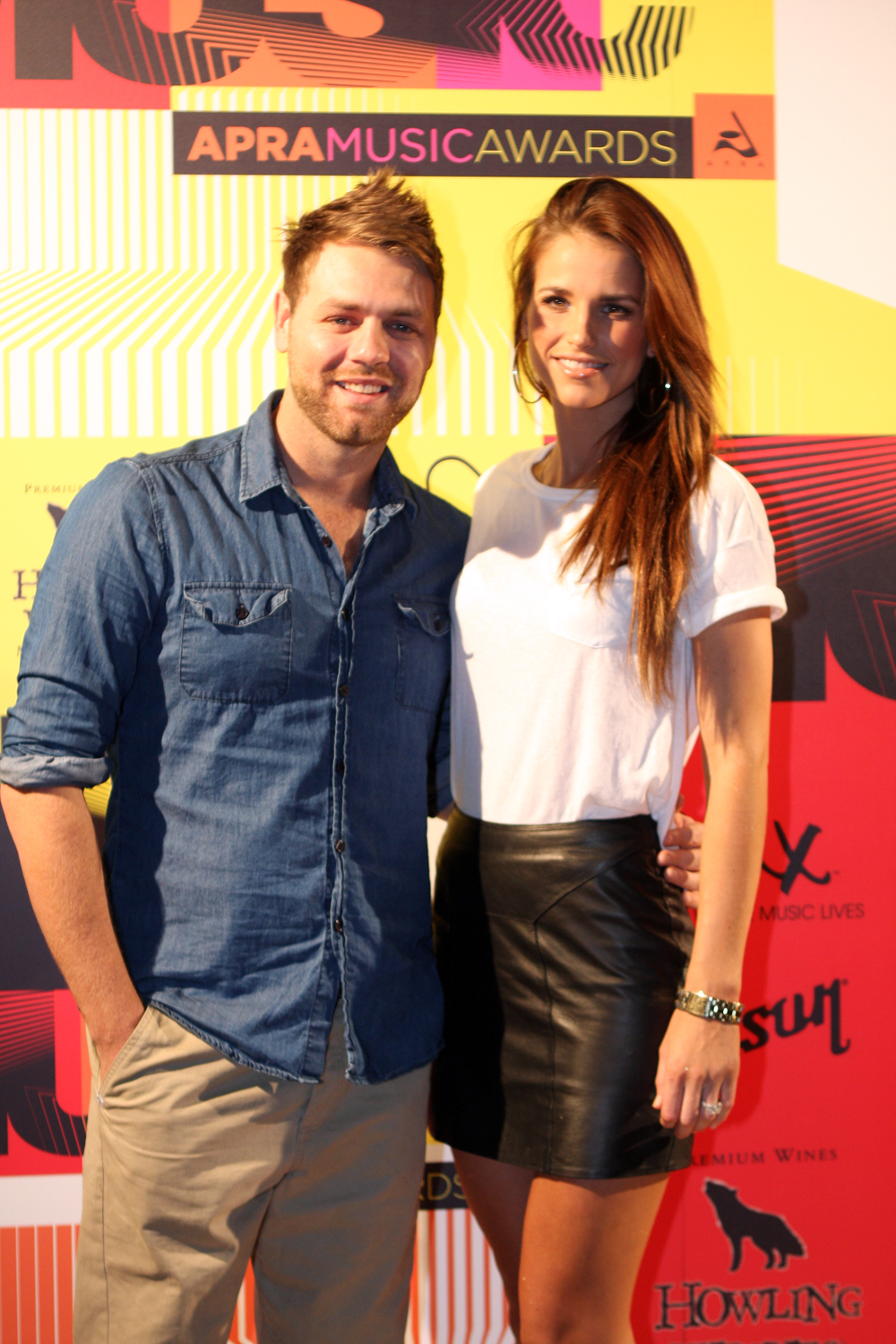
Williams attending APRA Music Awards of 2012 with her first husband Brian McFadden, to whom she was married between 2012 and 2017

In May 2011, she began dating former Westlife singer Brian McFadden. Their engagement was announced on 12 January 2012 and they were married on 2 September 2012 in Florence, Italy. In June 2015, Williams purchased an apartment in Howth, near Dublin. On 7 July 2015, Williams and McFadden announced that they were separating after three years of marriage. The couple divorced in 2017.

In January 2018 Williams became engaged to reality television personality Spencer Matthews; Williams and Matthews married on 9 June 2018. The couple have a son born in 2018, a daughter born in 2020 and a son born in 2022. Their first two children were christened in the Church of England, while the third was christened a Catholic. On 1 Sept 2026, Williams and Matthews announced the birth of their fourth child and third son.

== Filmography ==
Year	Title	Role	Notes	Ref.
2010–2011	Fade Street	Cast member	2 series	
2011	Blow Up The Liffey Bridges!	Molly Carroll	A play performed in the Bord Gáis Energy Theatre, Dublin	
2012	Dancing With the Stars	Contestant	Season 12	
2013	Stepping Out	Contestant	Finished in second place with Brian McFadden	
2013	Reality Bites: Vogue Does Home and Away	Presenter	RTÉ2 series special about the 25th anniversary of Home and Away	
2014	Vogue Does the Afterlife	Presenter	Aired on 18 December 2014 on RTÉ2	
2015	Bear Grylls: Mission Survive	Contestant	Series 1 winner	
2015	Vogue Does Straight A's	Presenter	RTÉ2 documentary about revisiting the Leaving Cert examination	
2015	Vogue Williams – Wild Girls	Presenter	3-part RTÉ2 series looking at women in prison, female fighters and sex "swinging"	
2015–2025	Lorraine	Guest	Several episodes	
2016	Vogue Williams – On the Edge	Presenter	4-part RTÉ2 series looking at transgender issues, bodybuilding, catfishing and drugs	
2016, 2026	Loose Women	Guest panellist	3 episodes	
2016	Celebrity Haunted Hotel: Live	Participant	1 episode	
2017	Partners in Rhyme	Guest	1 episode	
2018	Celebrity Mastermind	Contestant	1 episode	
2018–2019	Getaways	Co-presenter	BBC Northern Ireland series	
2019	Your Face or Mine?	Contestant, alongside husband Spencer Matthews	Series 6 Episode 1	
2020	Tipping Point: Lucky Stars	Contestant	1 episode	
2021	The Big Deal	Presenter	Aired on Virgin Media One	
2022	Send Nudes: Body SOS	Presenter	E4 series	
2023	Joanne & Vogue’s Sex Drive	Co-presenter; alongside Joanne McNally	E4 series	
2023	Spooked Ireland	Presenter	Paranormal investigation; series 1	
2024	Richard Osman's House of Games	Contestant	Series 8, Week 1	
2024	Strictly Come Dancing Christmas Special	Contestant	2024 Christmas Special	
2025	Renovation Rescue	Co-host	With Luke Mabbott	
2025	Gabby's Dollhouse: The Movie	Kitty Fridge (voice)	Film role; UK version	
2025	Im A Celebrity Get Me Out Of Here	Contestant	10th place	
2025	Gladiators Celebrity Special Christmas 2025	Contender		
