= 2014 Rose of Tralee =

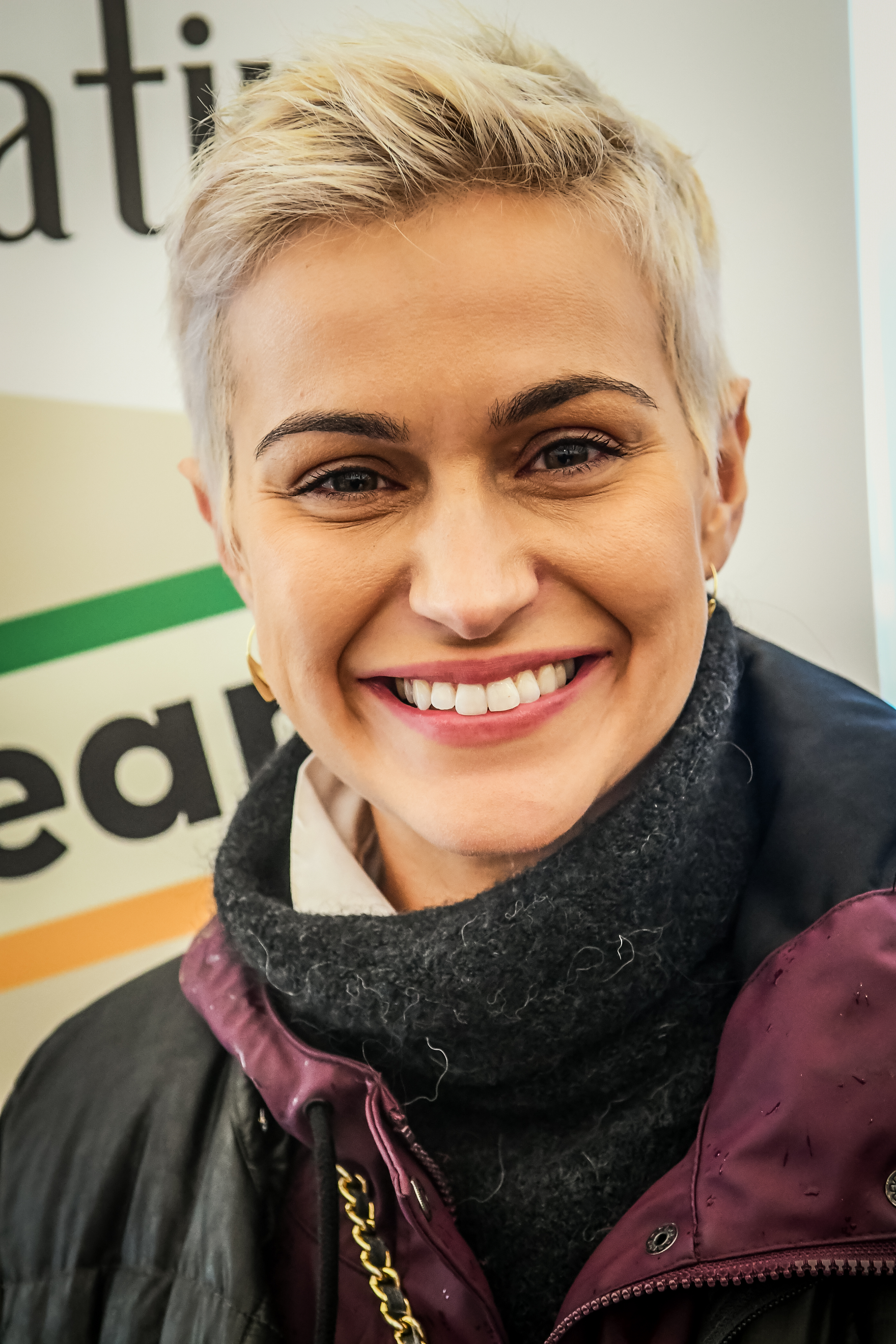
- The winner, Maria Walsh in 2018
- Date: 18–19 August 2014
- Presenters: Dáithí Ó Sé
- Entertainment: HomeTown (18 August) Nathan Carter (19 August)
- Venue: Festival Dome, Tralee, County Kerry, Ireland
- Broadcaster: RTÉ
- Entrants: 32
- Winner: Maria Walsh (Philadelphia)

The 2014 Rose of Tralee was the 56th edition of the annual Irish international festival held on 18–19 August 2014. The competition was televised live on RTÉ television.

The Philadelphia Rose, 27-year-old Maria Walsh, was named as the 2014 International Rose of Tralee. She was a native of Boston in the United States who moved to Shrule, County Mayo in Ireland in 1994. After her college education, she emigrated to New York City in the United States then moved to Philadelphia in 2011.

She had been the favourite with the bookies, with Paddy Power offering odds of 2/5 for her to take victory.

This also marked the first time that Philadelphia had ever won the event.

Walsh revealed that she was a lesbian five days after her coronation.
