= 2012 Rose of Tralee =

- Date: 20–21 August 2012
- Presenters: Dáithí Ó Sé
- Venue: Festival Dome, Tralee, County Kerry, Ireland
- Broadcaster: RTÉ
- Entrants: 32
- Winner: Nicola McEvoy (Luxembourg)

The 2012 Rose of Tralee was the 54th edition of the annual Irish international festival, held on 20–21 August 2012 at the Festival Dome, in Tralee, County Kerry. Dáithí Ó Sé returned as host for the third time, just a matter of weeks after marrying the 2008 New Jersey Rose, Rita Talty. The Luxembourg Rose, 26-year-old Nicola McEvoy, was named as the 2012 International Rose of Tralee. Going into the show, the Dublin and Mayo Roses were tipped as the favourites to win with McEvoy not far behind them. The win for Luxembourg marked the first time they had ever won the event and they became the first European country to win the event in 10 years when Italy Rose Tamara Gervasoni became the 2002 International Rose of Tralee.

The background music for the event was composed by the Garda Síochána Orchestra.

The judges for the 2012 Rose of Tralee were; RTÉ's Mary Kennedy, Michael Kearney, CAO of The Carlton Hotel Group, Denise Murphy O'Sullivan, the 1991 Rose of Tralee, Paul Neeson, Retail Director of Dublin Airport Authority, Jan Dowling, Motivation Weight Management and Tom Curran, Kerry County manager.

Ireland and Munster rugby player Ronan O'Gara was present on the final night and presented the winning Rose with her sash and tiara. Irish band The Coronas also performed their song "Addicted to Progress" during the show.

2012 was the first year that the Denver Rose and the Tyrone Rose made it onto the televised Rose Selection.

== List of Roses ==
Regional Title	Contestant	Age
Boston & New England	Lissa Bramley	27
Chicago	Margaret Rose Keating	23
Cork	Brid Ryan	27
Darwin	Sheila McAndrew	24
Denver	Tiffany Antikainen	22
Down	Una Matthews	23
Dublin	Arlene O'Neill	25
Germany	Bronwyn Sass	24
Kerry	Ann-Marie Hayes	24
Kilkenny	Aoibhin Murphy	18
London	Nóra Ni Fhlannagáin	23
Louth	Patricia Marmion	27
Luxembourg	Nicola McEvoy	26
Mayo	Dervla Kenny	26
Melbourne	Claire Lynch	25
New Orleans	Lisa Brady	21
New York City	Annemarie Lynch	22
New Zealand	Alana Marshall	25
Ottawa	Avaleigh Eastman	22
Perth	Lorna Gallagher	27
Philadelphia	Elizabeth Spellman	27
Queensland	Ciara Phelan	27
South Australia	Sarah Doherty	25
Southern California	Erin Kelly	23
Sunderland	Talitha Orlandi	21
Sydney	Sophia Fitzgerald	25
Texas	Kelly Gaetano	24
Toronto	Máire Dineen	23
Tyrone	Catherine Sherry	19
Washington, D.C.	Briana Apgar	21
Waterford	Lorna Ferncombe	26
Westmeath	Aisling Baker	21

A. Each Rose is accompanied by an Escort whose job it is to look after their Rose and to ensure that her time at the Festival is a memorable and enjoyable experience. Every year the Roses & the Escorts vote on who they believed was the best Escort throughout the festival, the person with the most votes is then crowned Escort of the Year.

== Broadcasting ==
The 2012 Rose of Tralee was broadcast live on RTÉ One and it was also streamed live on the RTÉ website for viewers all over the globe. The show received an audience share of 45%, the first time the audience share has dipped below 50% since 2008.
