= 2015 Rose of Tralee =

- Date: 17–18 August 2015
- Presenters: Dáithí Ó Sé
- Entertainment: Mike Denver (17 August), Daniel O'Donnell (18 August)
- Venue: Festival Dome, Tralee, County Kerry, Ireland
- Broadcaster: RTÉ
- Entrants: 32
- Winner: Elysha Brennan (Meath)

The 2015 Rose of Tralee was the 57th edition of the annual Irish international festival held on 17–18 August 2015. The competition was televised live on RTÉ television.

The Meath Rose, 22-year-old medical student Elysha Brennan, was named as the 2015 International Rose of Tralee. Elysha, who had been studying at the Royal College of Surgeons in Dublin is from Bettystown, and had been the favourite to win the contest. She is also first Meath Rose to win and the first to represent the county at the Dome in Tralee. It was the first since the inaugural festival in 1959 that the winner was in its debutante year. It also marked the first time that Meath had ever won the event, and it was the first Irish victory at the event in seven years when Tipperary Rose Aoife Kelly was crowned the 2008 International Rose of Tralee.

RTÉ ratings showed that 760,300 viewers tuned into the show, making it the ninth most watched show on RTÉ so far in 2015. Twitter users sent over 52,000 Rose of Tralee-related tweets over the two days of the show.
