= Derek O'Connor =

Derek O'Connor may refer to:

- Derek O'Connor (footballer, born 1955), Scottish football striker for St. Johnstone and Hearts
- Derek O'Connor (footballer, born 1978), Irish football goalkeeper for Huddersfield Town
- Derek O'Connor (journalist), Irish writer and filmmaker
