= Maria Walsh (politician) =

Irish politician (born 1987)

Maria Walsh MEP
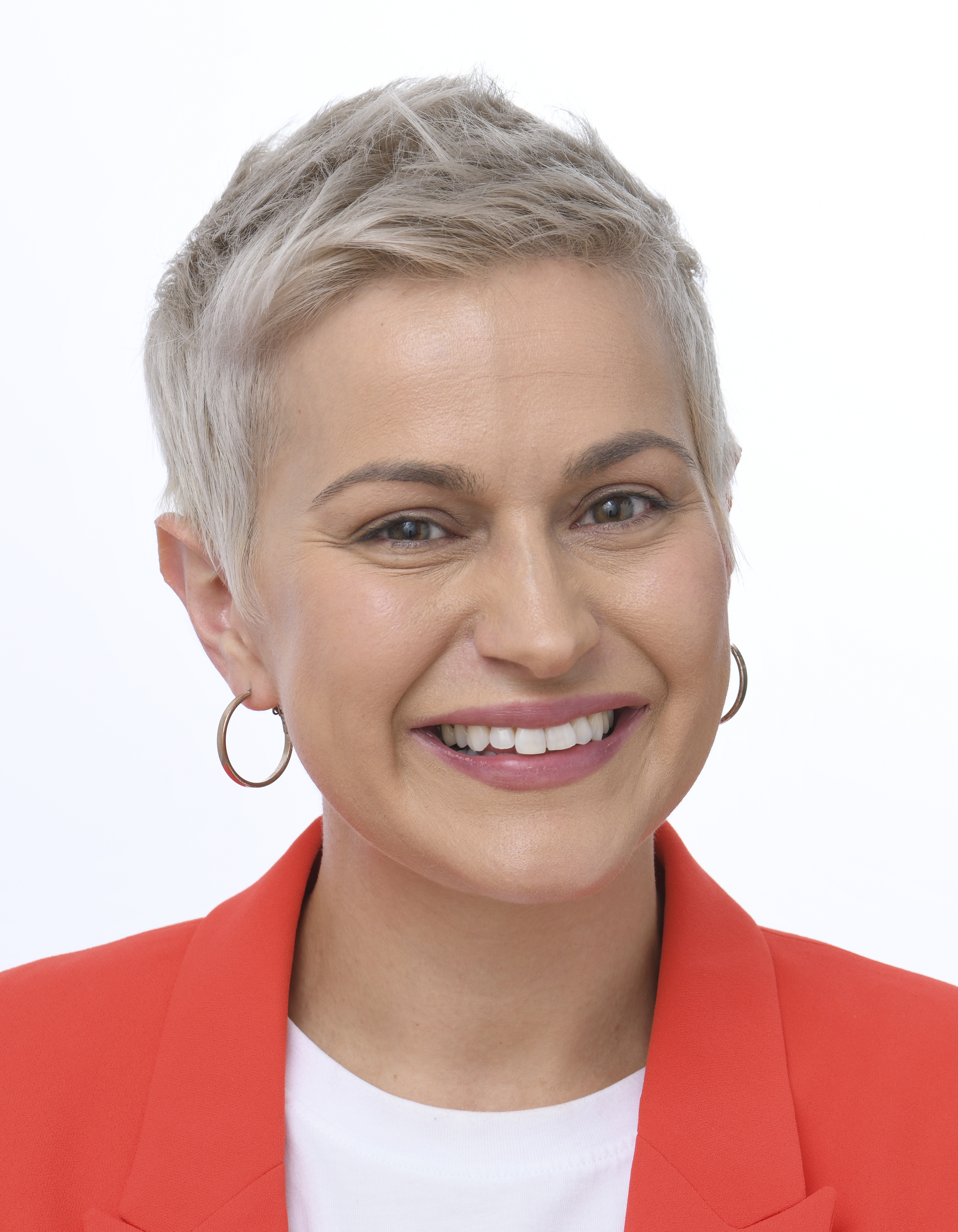
- Walsh in 2024

Member of the European Parliament
- Incumbent
- Assumed office 2 July 2019
- Constituency: Midlands–North-West

Personal details
- Born: 11 June 1987 (age 39) Boston, Massachusetts, U.S.
- Party: Ireland: Fine Gael; EU: European People's Party
- Children: 1
- Education: Griffith College Dublin
- Website: mariawalsh.eu

Military service
- Allegiance: Ireland
- Branch/service: Army Reserve
- Unit: Cavalry Corps

Maria Walsh (born 11 June 1987) is an Irish politician who has been a Member of the European Parliament (MEP) from Ireland for the Midlands–North-West constituency since July 2019. She was re-elected for a second five-year term in June 2024. She is a member of Fine Gael, part of the European People's Party. Outside of politics, she is known for winning the 2014 Rose of Tralee pageant.

== Early life and education ==
Maria Walsh was born in Boston, Massachusetts, on 11 June 1987. Her mother, Noreen, grew up in Leitir Móir in Connemara in County Galway, while her father Vincent is from Roundfort in County Mayo. Vincent emigrated to the United States in 1973 to work as a carpenter near Boston, where he met Noreen. They had four children, two sons and two daughters, all born in the United States. The family moved to Shrule, County Mayo in Ireland in 1994 after purchasing a 60-acre farm there. Maria Walsh studied journalism at Griffith College Dublin, after which she moved to New York City. She moved to Philadelphia in 2011.

Between 2017 and 2019 Walsh served as a member of the Army Reserve as a trooper with the Cavalry Corps (1st Armoured Cavalry Squadron) based in the Defence Forces Training Centre, Curragh Camp.

== 2014 Rose of Tralee ==
The 2014 Rose of Tralee was the 55th edition of the annual Irish international festival held on 15–19 August 2014. The international finals of the competition were broadcast live by RTÉ One television on 18–19 August. Maria Walsh, competing as the Philadelphia Rose, was crowned the winner of the competition on 19 August. She was aged 27 at the time, and had moved to Philadelphia in 2011. She had been the favourite with the bookies, with Paddy Power offering odds of 2/5 for her to take victory. During her time as the reigning Rose of Tralee, Walsh met with US President Barack Obama in the White House on St. Patrick's Day 2015.

== Political career ==
=== European Parliament elections ===
Walsh first entered electoral politics in the 2019 European Parliament election. During the campaign a website 'designed to look like a campaign site in favour of Walsh's candidacy' was set up to oppose her campaign and 'the homosexual lifestyle'. The website broadcast ads on Google and Facebook. After Fine Gael requested that both Google and Facebook remove the ads, Facebook refused to do so, professing that the ads 'did not break community standards'. Despite this, Walsh was elected in that election as an MEP from Midlands–North-West constituency as a member of Fine Gael and of the European People's Party. She was the third of four successful candidates; Walsh placed behind her Fine Gael colleague Mairead McGuinness and Independent Luke "Ming" Flanagan, and ahead of Sinn Féin's Matt Carthy. Unlike Walsh, the other three successful candidates were already sitting MEPs for the constituency.

Walsh was re-elected in the 2024 European Parliament election, receiving 71,476 (10.5%) of the first preference votes.

=== In the European Parliament ===
In October 2019, Walsh, alongside fellow members of Fine Gael Mairead McGuinness, Frances Fitzgerald and Seán Kelly, voted against an EU resolution to increase the number of vessels providing search and rescue missions in the Mediterranean. Walsh said she did in fact support more search and rescue missions in the Mediterranean but cited an amendment inserted into the resolution which would have mandated that radar information would be shared among all vessels in the Mediterranean, a provision that Walsh suggested would backfire by tipping-off human smugglers, helping them avoid the authorities. The resolution was rejected by a margin of two votes.

As a dual US-Irish citizen, Walsh was entitled to vote in the 2020 US Presidential election, and did so, casting her vote for Joe Biden.

In February 2020, Walsh broke with European People's Party (the European Parliamentary party of which Fine Gael is a member) ranks to support a veto on the construction of a number of energy production projects across Europe which included 55 fossil fuel projects. Walsh was one of only three EPP members to do so. One of the 55 fuel projects in question is a Liquefied natural gas station at Ballylongford in County Kerry, which critics suggest could be used to bring imported fracked gas into Ireland from the US and Canada. Outlining the reasons behind her vote, Walsh underlined her opposition to fracking. The veto did not pass, but fellow Irish MEPs such as the Green Party's Ciarán Cuffe praised her for her actions.

In June 2021 while speaking in the European Parliament, Walsh called for more focus to be given to sexual rights and reproductive rights in education following the publishing of a report by the EU calling for greater rights for women across member nations.

In July 2021 Walsh supported the European Commission's legal action against Hungary and Poland over their attempts to introduce laws concerning the LGBT Community there. Walsh stated "In the two years that I've been elected, we have had a number of resolutions: one being against what Poland had done in terms of creating these LGBTI free zones. Again, and most recently with the Hungarian changes in their legislation that is anti-everything the EU stands for in terms of values and principles such as treating everyone equal and fair. But ultimately, we need the Commission now to ensure that if this two month period for infringement procedures, if that is not seen, we cannot kick the bucket down the line any further. We need to have action. Orbán faces a new election next year and it's important that myself and other MEPs continue to denounce his work." Walsh also announced she would be attending a pride march in Budapest, with the goal of demonstrating to the Hungarian LGBT community that the EU stood by them.

Walsh was re-elected at the 2024 European Parliament election, receiving 71,476 (10.5%) of the first preference votes.

In 2025 Walsh was awarded Joint Winner of the European Values Champion of the Year an MEP Award.

== Personal life ==
Walsh publicly came out as a lesbian after winning the Rose of Tralee in 2014. She stated that she had come out privately to her parents more than two years earlier, after meeting her first girlfriend. In 2016, she began a relationship with Emmy-nominated television producer Shauna Keogh. Walsh stated in 2017 that she wanted to marry Keogh, but the couple ended their relationship the following year.

In 2017, Walsh co-founded the events and wedding planning company Juniper & Ruby. A member of the Pioneers since the age of 12, she does not drink alcohol.

In 2024, Walsh began researching options to become a single parent, stating that her "dream was to be in a partnership" when she became a mother, but "that just didn’t happen". In May 2026, Walsh announced that she had become pregnant through IVF. In October 2026, she gave birth to a baby girl.
