= The Big Deal (2021 TV series) =

- Genre: Reality competition
- Created by: Matt Laesch
- Presented by: Vogue Williams
- Judges: Aston Merrygold; Boy George; Deirdre O'Kane; Jedward; Lyra
- Country of origin: Ireland
- Original language: English
- No. of series: 1
- No. of episodes: 6

Production
- Executive producer: Shane Byrne
- Production location: 3Arena
- Production companies: Fox Alternative Entertainment; BiggerStage

Original release
- Network: Virgin Media One
- Release: 4 September – 10 October 2021

The Big Deal is an Irish reality talent competition programme which aired from 4 September to 10 October 2021 on Virgin Media One.

== Production ==
Virgin Media Television announced The Big Deal in June 2021 for a six-episode run. The programme would be presented by Vogue Williams, and feature Aston Merrygold, Boy George, Deirdre O'Kane, Jedward, and Lyra as judges. It was filmed at the 3Arena in Dublin.

The series is a co-production with Fox Alternative Entertainment—the non-scripted production arm of U.S. television network Fox, and BiggerStage—an agency led by former managing director of Virgin Media Television Pat Kiely. Fox's president of alternative entertainment and specials Rob Wade explained that it had become more cost-effective to co-fund an initial run of a new, in-house format in a test market with similar demographics to the United States, than to produce one-off pilots. He explained that its performance in Ireland could then be used to help pitch the format to broadcasters, such as Fox and other potential international broadcasters. In September 2022, Deadline Hollywood reported that Fox had pitched an American adaptation of the format under the title Fame or Fortune.

== Format ==
After performing for a panel of judges, acts must choose to either take a cash buyout and leave the show, or decline it for a chance to qualify for the series finale, where they could win the €50,000 grand prize.

== See also ==
- Walk the Line
