= Maidhc Dainín Ó Sé =

Irish writer and musician (1942–2013)

- Ó Sé in 2011
- Born: 2 February 1942 Carrachán, County Kerry, Ireland
- Died: 29 August 2013 (aged 71) Carrachán, County Kerry, Ireland
- Occupation: Writer; musician
- Notable works: A Thig Ná Tit Orm (1987)
- Spouse: Caitlín Nic Gearailt
- Children: 5, including Dáithí Ó Sé

Maidhc Dainín Ó Sé (2 February 1942 – 29 August 2013) was an Irish writer and musician. He wrote exclusively in the Irish language, and is best known for his autobiography, A Thig Ná Tit Orm. He was the father of the television presenter Dáithí Ó Sé.

== Life ==
Ó Sé was born in Carrachán, County Kerry, in 1942. He was the son of a fisherman from Baile na nGall called Dainín Dan Ó Sé and his wife from an Daingean, Máire Ní Chinnéide. In 1958, at the age of 16, Maidhc moved to England for a while, before moving to Chicago in 1959. He returned to Ireland in 1969.

His writings were used as part of the Irish-language element of the Leaving Certificate in Irish state education, as a replacement for Peig from 1995.

== Writings ==
=== Autobiography ===
- A Thig Ná Tit Orm ("House Don't Fall on Me"; Baile Átha Cliath: Coiscéim 1987)

=== Fiction ===
- Corcán na dTrí gCos (Baile Átha Cliath: Coiscéim 1988)
- Tae le tae (Baile Átha Cliath: Coiscéim 1990)
- Chicago driver (Baile Átha Cliath: Coiscéim 1992)
- Dochtúir na bPiast (Baile Átha Cliath: Coiscéim 1993)
- Greenhorn (Baile Átha Cliath: Coiscéim 1997)
- Madraí na nocht gcos (Baile Atha Cliath: Coisceim 1998)
- Mair, a chapaill (Baile Átha Cliath: Coiscéim 1999)
- Is glas iad na cnoic (Baile Átha Cliath: Coiscéim 1997)
- Lilí Frainc (Baile Átha Cliath: Coiscéim 2001)
- Mura mBuafam - Suatham (Baile Átha Cliath: Coisceim 2003)
- Idir dhá lios (Baile Átha Cliath: Coiscéim 2005)
- Nuadha agus Breoghan ar neamh (Baile Átha Cliath: Coisceim 2006)
- Binn Éadair (Baile Átha Cliath: Coiscéim 2006)
- Seán Óg Máirtín (Baile Átha Cliath: Coiscéim 2007)
- Lucinda Sly: úrscéal stairiúil (Baile Átha Cliath: Coiscéim 2008)
- Cara go brách: Úrscéal (Baile Átha Cliath: Coiscéim 2010)

=== Poetry ===
- Citeal na stoirme (Baile Átha Cliath: Coiscéim 1991)

== Music ==
- Ó Chicago go Carrachán (Cló Iar-Chonnacht 1999)
- Ó Thuaidh - Traditional Song and Music from West Kerry
