= Talulah Does the Hula =

Irish pop band

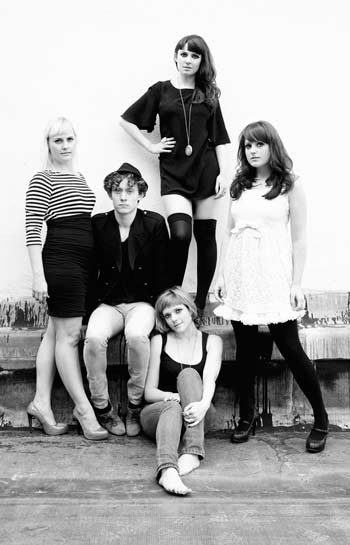
- Talulah Does the Hula, photo by Jeannie O'Brien.

Background information
- Origin: Dublin, Ireland
- Genres: Pop
- Years active: 2008–2011
- Spinoffs: September Girls
- Past members: Paula Cullen; Caoimhe Derwin; Lauren Kerchner; Jessie Ward; Michael Winder
- Website: talulahdoesthehula.com

Talulah Does the Hula were a five-piece pop band from Dublin, Ireland.

== Members ==
- Paula Cullen – Vocals, Keyboards, Bass, Guitar, Tambourine
- Caoimhe Derwin – Vocals, Guitar, Bass, Keyboards,
- Lauren Kerchner – Vocals, Guitar, Bass, Keyboards
- Jessie Ward – Vocals, Bass, Guitar, Keyboards
- Michael Winder – Drums

== Band ==
Talulah Does the Hula's members include Paula Cullen and Caoimhe Derwin formerly of The Chalets, and Jessie Ward and Lauren Kerchner formerly of Neosupervital. The band formed in early 2008 and performed their first gig in Dublin in October 2008. All four girls sing both lead vocals and harmonies and also swap instruments on nearly every song they perform. The band took their name from a New Zealand court case in which a 9-year-old girl was made a ward of the court so she could change her given name of Talula Does the Hula From Hawaii.

In 2011, Michael Winder moved to England and the band decided to call it a day under the Talulah moniker. The remaining four members went on to form a new group, September Girls, in September 2011.

== Releases ==
The band released their first single in June 2009, a double A-side with the tracks "Bad Boyfriend" and "Those Girls." Jim Carroll of the Irish Times reviewed the single, saying it had "Sugar-sweet harmonies", "Swinging, gum-chewing, swaggering suaveness to knock your pop socks off" and "Sunny-side-up melodies ripped, recycled and respun from beneath the armpits of giants such as The Shangri-Las and The Ramones". The single was chosen as "Single of the Fortnight" by Hot Press magazine and the video for "Bad Boyfriend" was nominated in the "Best Newcomer" category at the Irish Music TV Video Awards in November 2009.

The band's second single, another double A-side with the tracks "Don't Panic", "Real Friends" and a remix of "Bad Boyfriend", was released on 7 May 2010. The video for "Don't Panic" was nominated in the "Best Styled Video" category at the Irish Music TV Video Awards in November 2010, where the band also performed live.

In 2010 the band had music on and appeared on several Irish television programs. In February 2010 they performed a cover of "Da Doo Ron Ron" on the RTÉ Two program Podge and Rodge and they also had recurring live performances on RTÉ Two program The Rumour Room. In September 2010 they performed "Don't Panic" on long-running Irish chat program The Late Late Show. In October 2010 their song "Those Girls" was selected as the theme tune for the RTÉ program Fade Street.

The band released their third double A-side single with the tracks "They Say" and "Tomorrow's Yours" on 14 July 2011.
