= 2019 Rose of Tralee =

- Date: 26–27 August 2019
- Presenters: Dáithí Ó Sé
- Venue: Festival Dome, Tralee, County Kerry, Ireland
- Broadcaster: RTÉ
- Entrants: 32
- Winner: Sinéad Flanagan (Limerick)

The 2019 Rose of Tralee was the 61st edition of the annual Irish international festival held on 26–27 August 2019. The competition was televised live on RTÉ television. 57 women from all over the world took part during the Rose of Tralee festival with 32 going on to the live shows.

The Limerick Rose, 27-year-old Sinéad Flanagan, was named as the 2019 International Rose of Tralee. This gave Limerick its first victory at the event since 1994 and its third win overall.
