= Alice O'Sullivan =

First winner of the Rose of Tralee

- Born: c. 1940; Dublin, Ireland
- Occupation: Air hostess
- Known for: Winning The Rose of Tralee in 1959

Alice O'Sullivan (born c. 1940) is the first ever winner of The Rose of Tralee, having been crowned in 1959. In 2009, she was one of the judges for the fiftieth anniversary of the festival. Rosita Boland of The Irish Times commented on O'Sullivan's admission that she had not watched any of the television coverage of the event in the years since her win: "This has to make her perspective tonight and tomorrow—on the annual mini-dramas of frocks, party pieces and lovely girls—unique among all past and present Rose of Tralee judges".

O'Sullivan was born in Dublin. She has lived in Roundwood, County Wicklow for four decades. Her father was a civil servant in Tralee, County Kerry. Working as an air hostess, she entered the Rose of Tralee at the age of 19. She later noted that she had to enter the hall alone as there was no escort system in the early years and that she had thought: "God, this is embarrassing". As the Dublin Rose, she beat four other contestants; two from the United Kingdom, one from New York City and one from Tralee. Her prize involved the presentation of trophies at the races in Tralee for one week. Her win was not broadcast on national television, as was the case in later years, but it was shown to an audience in a local parish hall. T. Ryle Dwyer's The Rose of Tralee, Fifty Years A-Blooming stated that "a whole entertainment ecosystem" involving donkeys and sheepdogs emerged from O'Sullivan's victory in the pageant. Despite this, media hype was virtually non-existent when compared to modern festivals and O'Sullivan managed to get away with claiming that her cousin had won instead of her.

O'Sullivan was heavily involved in the promotion of the fiftieth anniversary of the Rose of Tralee. On 24 January 2009, she appeared alongside then Rose Aoife Kelly on Tubridy Tonight to discuss the event's fiftieth anniversary on live television. She also contributed to Five Decades of Roses, a documentary which was originally aired on 24 August 2009 and gained a 36% audience share.

Upon her return as judge for the fiftieth anniversary, O'Sullivan described that year's bunch as "absolutely splendid and well-travelled" and said she was "astounded" by them. She described the judging process as "both interesting and challenging". O'Sullivan partied all night, provoking that year's winner Charmaine Kenny to say she felt like "a bit of a party popper" for having had one hour of sleep and "a bit of a lightweight beside her". O'Sullivan, instead of going to bed, then embarked on a 3 kilometre (2 mile) walk the following morning. Victoria Mary Clarke later wrote in the Sunday Independent of how O'Sullivan "glided glamorously through the hotel", commenting that "when I am her age, I would not object to being like her".
