= Stephen Glover (composer) =

English composer of songs, ballads and duets

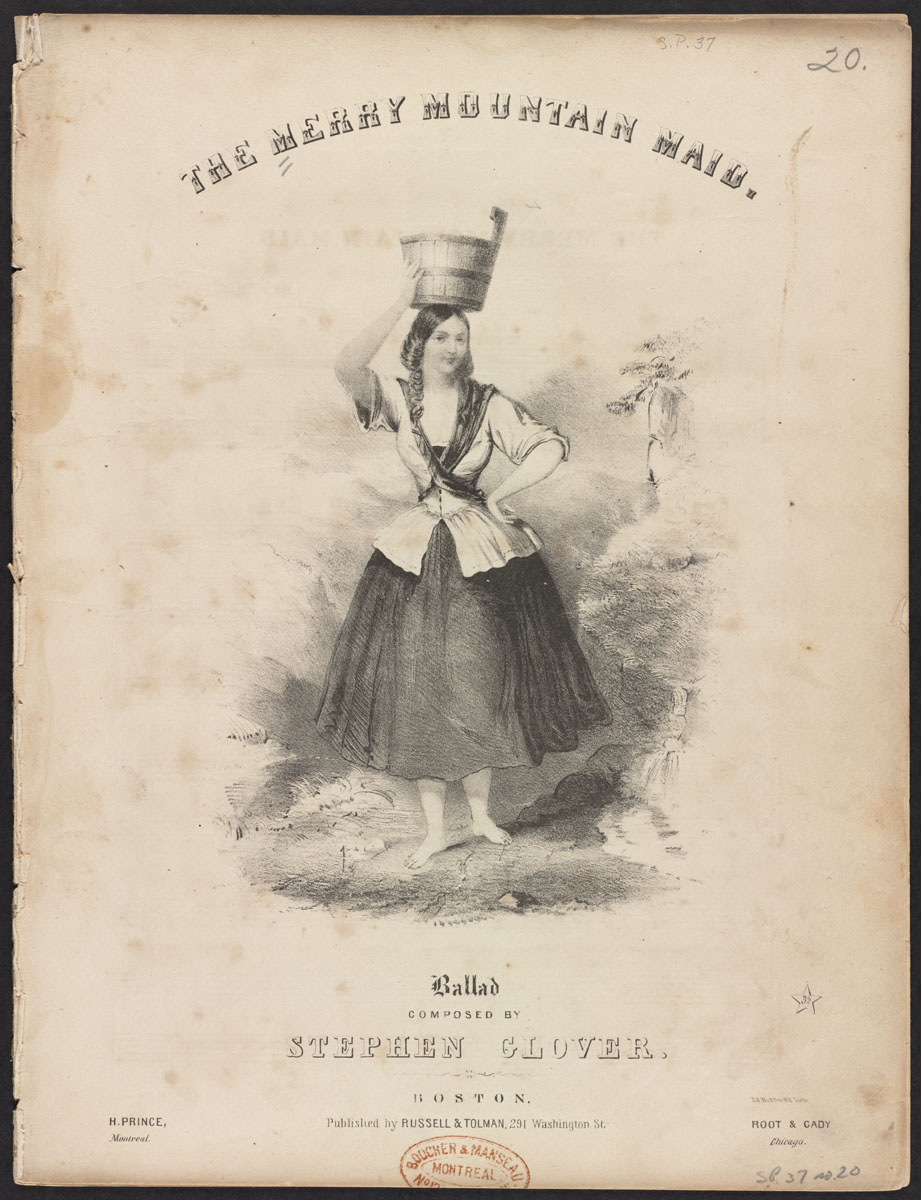
Sheet music for Glover's Merry Mountain Maid, in the collection of the Boston Public Library.

Stephen Glover (1812/13 – 7 December 1870) was an English composer and teacher.

Stephen Glover was brother to Charles William Glover. He was born in London in 1812 or 1813 and became a popular composer of songs, ballads and duets. The Monks of Old (1842), What are the Wild Waves Saying (1850), Excelsior and Songs from the Holy Scriptures illustrate the range and taste of the fourteen or fifteen hundred compositions Glover presented to the public from 1847 until his death, on 7 December 1870, at the age of 57.

NOTE: A song by Stephen Glover is not shown in the listings of his compositions. On the cover of piece of sheet music published in New York, it is entitled "Gently Sighs the Breeze." At the bottom it reads: "The popular duet, written for Madlle. Jenny Lind & Madlle. Marietta Alboni." The inside of the sheet gives the title as "The Evening Breeze", with words by J. E. Carpenter. It is likely an 1848/50 publication. The cover has a black & white litho of the two women.
