= The Hedrons =

British rock band

- Origin: Glasgow, Scotland
- Genres: Punk, indie
- Years active: 2005–2012
- Label: Measured Records
- Members: Soup (Lesley McLaren) (Drums); Gill (Gill Bickerstaff) (Bass); Rosie (McLune) (Guitar); Tippi (Lead Singer/Guitar)

The Hedrons were an all-girl four-piece rock band, formed in early 2005 in their native Glasgow.

== Career ==
The band have released three singles on the Glasgow-based label, Measured Records. Two singles went top 5 and one went top 20 in the Scottish Chart. Their debut album One More Won't Kill Us was released on 5 February 2007.

The Hedrons appeared at several UK music festivals in 2006, including Download Festival, T in the Park, Isle of Wight Festival, Be in Belhaven and Guilfest and also undertook several UK tours. They toured America three times, appeared at SXSW, Canadian Music Week & Quebec City Music Festival. They have been special guest openers for bands such as Sex Pistols, Rolling Stones, Towers Of London and Alice in Chains.

They toured Germany in 2007 with Pigeon Detectives and The Wombats.

They appeared on Tubridy Tonight in Ireland playing out the show and on a Channel 4 documentary about Isle of Wight Festival.

In September 2007 they were nominated for a BT Digital Music Award and found themselves in the same category as Dave Gilmour, Robbie Williams, Stereophonics and The Rakes.

The Hedrons' second album, "Tired of Taking", was released in November 2023.

== Discography ==
=== Singles ===
- "Be My Friend" / "Stop Look & Listen" (31 July 2006)
- "I Need You" (9 October 2006)
- "Heatseeker" (8 January 2007)

=== Albums ===
- One More Won't Kill Us (5 February 2007)
- Tired of Taking (November 2023)
