= Charles William Glover =

English violinist and composer

Charles William Glover (February 1806 – 23 March 1863) was an English violinist and composer.

He was the elder brother of Stephen Glover.

Glover played the violin in the orchestras of Drury Lane and Covent Garden theatres, and was appointed musical director at the Queen's Theatre in 1832. He composed numerous songs, duets, pianoforte pieces, and arrangements. Some of the vocal pieces are semicomic, such as 'Cousin Harry;' while 'Tis hard to give the Hand where the Heart can never be' is a specimen of his once popular sentimental ballads.

Glover is considered to have written the music for the well-known Irish song "The Rose of Tralee".
