= The Rose of Tralee (song) =

Irish ballad (19th century)

Song
- Genre: Ballad
- Composer: Charles William Glover
- Lyricist: Edward Mordaunt Spencer

"The Rose of Tralee" is a nineteenth-century Irish ballad about a woman called Mary, who because of her beauty was called The Rose of Tralee. The Rose of Tralee International Festival is inspired by the ballad.

The words of the song are credited to Edward Mordaunt Spencer and the music to Charles William Glover, but a story circulated in connection with the festival claims that the song was written by William Pembroke Mulchinock, out of love for Mary O'Connor, a poor maid in service to his family.

In 2019 the Rose of Tralee International Festival, as part of their 60th Anniversary living history promotion, employed the services of Dr. Andrea Nini, a forensic linguist working on cases of disputed authorship. His report concluded that a poem written by Tralee poet William Pembroke Mulchinock called Smile Mary My Darling was published and passed off by Edward Mordaunt Spencer in 1846 in his book of poetry The Heir of Abbotsville. This poem was adapted into a poem called The Rose of Tralee with the air being re-set by Charles William Glover from one of his previous ballads.

== Lyrics ==
The pale moon was rising above the green mountain,
The sun was declining beneath the blue sea;
When I strayed with my love to the pure crystal fountain,
That stands in the beautiful Vale of Tralee.
She was lovely and fair as the rose of the summer,
Yet 'twas not her beauty alone that won me;
Oh no, 'twas the truth in her eyes ever dawning,
That made me love Mary, the Rose of Tralee.

The cool shades of evening their mantle were spreading,
And Mary all smiling was listening to me;
The moon through the valley her pale rays was shedding,
When I won the heart of the Rose of Tralee.
Though lovely and fair as the Rose of the summer,
Yet 'twas not her beauty alone that won me;
Oh no, 'twas the truth in her eyes ever dawning,
That made me love Mary the Rose of Tralee.

In the far fields of India, 'mid war's dreadful thunders,
Her voice was a solace and comfort to me,
But the chill hand of death has now rent us asunder,
I'm lonely tonight for the Rose of Tralee.
She was lovely and fair as the rose of the summer,
Yet 'twas not her beauty alone that won me;
Oh no, 'twas the truth in her eyes ever dawning,
That made me love Mary, The Rose of Tralee

== Popular culture ==
The song was sung by John McCormack in the film Song o' My Heart (1930).
In the film The Informer (1935), it is sung by Denis O'Dea.
Gordon MacRae sings the song in the film The Daughter of Rosie O'Grady (1950).

Bing Crosby recorded the song on 17 July 1945 for Decca Records with John Scott Trotter and his Orchestra and it was included in his album St. Patrick's Day.

It was sung by the cast at the end of the play Thirst (1942) by Flann O'Brien.

In the film The Luck of the Irish the song is sung by Irish tenor Jimmy O'Brien, who completes the song without missing a beat despite the outbreak of a brawl.

The song was used by the Ireland national rugby union team at the 1987 Rugby World Cup. It was a compromise choice instead of a national anthem, due to the political situation in Northern Ireland at the time.

The Rose of Tralee is referenced in the title track of Tom Waits' 1985 album Rain Dogs.

"Oh, how we danced with the Rose of Tralee

Her long hair black as a raven"

Oh, how we danced and she whispered to me,

'You'll never be going back home.'"

In the film Auntie Mame (1958), Brian O'Bannion (Robin Hughes) sings the first couplet of "The Rose of Tralee" as he finishes dressing to escort Mame (Rosalind Russell) to a black tie event to consider optioning the film rights of her autobiography to Warner Brothers.

In the movie Caddyshack "The Rose of Tralee" is mentioned by the character Maggie O'Hooligan, played by Sarah Holcomb, while working the dining room with Danny Noonan at Bushwood Country Club:

Maggie: I know why you came here tonight.
Danny: Why
Maggie: That girl. Listen, I'd put that idea right out of your mind. She's been plucked more times than the Rose of Tralee. Biggest whore on Fifth Avenue, I'm told!
