= This Is Nightlive =

Irish comedy television show

- Johnny Hansom (centre) and his team
- Also known as: Nightlive
- Genre: Satire
- Created by: RTÉ in association with Stillwater Communications (Kara Hanahoe/John Ryan)
- Starring: John Ryan
- Country of origin: Ireland
- Original language: English
- No. of series: 1
- No. of episodes: 6

Production
- Producer: Cillian Fennell
- Running time: 30 minutes

Original release
- Network: RTÉ Two
- Release: 5 January – 9 February 2009

Related
- This is Daylive (TBC)

This Is Nightlive (also referred to as Nightlive) is an Irish satire television series broadcast on RTÉ Two. It was created by John Ryan who also starred in the series.

== Story and Plot ==
The fictional newsroom is described as having operated for four years and having won the Best-Dressed Current Affairs Team award at the 2008 VIP Style Awards. Its presenter, Johnny Hansom, is revealed to have been born Declan Foley and is described as an "increasingly unhinged" former DJ. His new co-host is Úna Óg Nic Ní Súillicáint. The other members of the team are entertainment correspondent Jackie Byrne-Daly, sports reporter Trevor Corocran and weather presenter Mike "Cloudy" Walsh.

== Reception ==
Fears were expressed in the build-up to the launch of the show that it would be the subject of much criticism. RTÉ did not send out any advance tapes to the press

Reviews of the show were negative. John Boland of the Irish Independent, was unamused with the "lame delivery" and the lack of a good script. It also failed to generate any great public interest, and was watched by an exceptionally small numbers of viewers.

A show source was reported to have expressed the discomfort felt by the actors after encountering the newscasters, weather people and presenters they are parodying in the RTÉ canteen, with one such incident occurring in the corridor outside the studio directly after the professional in question was filmed for the first episode.

Complaints against the show were subsequently upheld by Ireland's Broadcasting Commission on the grounds of its poor taste in featuring terminally-ill children for comic effect.

The first programme attracted 89,000 viewers, according to RTÉ. The second programme led to a decrease in viewing figures to 76,000, and the viewership stayed very low for the remainder of the series.

== Praise ==
One of the few people to praise the show was the former TV3 television presenter Lorraine Keane who was apparently parodied in it. She thought her character was "hilarious". The Evening Herald also noted the show's improvement towards the end of its run, believing that a few of the jokes in the final episode were "sharper than usual", and praised the "decent" idea of having Hansom copying "a Peter Finch-in-Network and getting the sack". (Of course, In Network the character played by Peter Finch does not end up getting the sack - but is actually assassinated.) The newspaper stated, in double-edged praise, that the funniest element in the entire programme was the brief, ticker-tape headlines rolling across the bottom of the screen, including the self-mocking joke by Ryan – "That loser who used to run a dog magazine".
