= Magill =

Irish politics and current affairs magazine

- Magill, November 2005 edition
- Editor: Sam Magill
- Frequency: Monthly
- Founded: 1977
- Final issue: 2010
- Country: Ireland
- Website: https://magill.ie

Magill was an Irish politics and current affairs magazine founded by Vincent Browne and others in 1977. Magill specialised in investigative articles and colourful reportage by journalists such as Eamonn McCann (who wrote its anonymous Wigmore column) and Gene Kerrigan. It was relaunched in 2004 after an earlier closure before closing again in 2009.

== Berry diaries ==
It first achieved a nationwide profile when it published the diaries of Peter Berry, the former Secretary (administrative head) to the Department of Justice in which he alleged that former Taoiseach Jack Lynch had been less than forthright publicly about the truth surrounding the 1970 Arms Crisis which brought down two ministers, including Charles Haughey.

In the 1980s as Ireland underwent rapid political change it became the major Irish magazine covering politics.

== Changes in editor ==
Browne later appointed a series of editors with him becoming managing editor. Its early editors included Fintan O'Toole, John Waters and Colm Tóibín. (Tóibín went on to achieve renown as a novelist.) However clashes of personalities with Browne led each editor in turn to quit the post as did one of its major writers Gene Kerrigan.

== Closures and relaunches ==
Magill ceased publication for a period in the 1990s before returning in 1997 as a joint effort between Browne and Michael O' Doherty, publisher of VIP Magazine. Its editors in its second incarnation included John Ryan, Emily O'Reilly, Harry McGee, Kevin Rafter, Eamon Delaney and Niall Stanage.

The magazine was sold by Browne to Hoson, owned by businessman Mike Hogan in the late 1990s. It closed in the early 2000s. It was acquired by Ian Hyland who had previously acquired Business & Finance.

The title was re-opened under a new editor (author and former diplomat) Eamon Delaney and deputy editor Andrew Lynch in November 2004. Whereas the earlier Magill was famously populist and leaned to the left, often carrying photographs of politicians with accusatory banner headlines, the new Magill published reviews, commentaries, analysis, book reviews and business reports as well as a broader range of articles than were found in Browne's fortnightly version. The new magazine was more right-of-centre than earlier versions.

The re-launch was viewed with particular relish in the world of political journalism because Magill was seen as the centrist answer to The Village, edited by Vincent Browne, the one-time editor of Magill. Upon becoming editor, Delaney told The Sunday Times that, "I respect the hard Irish left but it's the woolly liberal consensus of The Irish Times and RTÉ I have a problem with... They have this raft of outdated orthodoxies: the Americans are bad, the Israelis are evil, travellers are our greatest problem. One in three Irish people is supposed to be living in poverty and Vincent will, no doubt, interview them all."

Having dropped to an officially bi-monthly (and increasingly erratic) publication schedule in 2008, the magazine once again ceased publication in mid-2009 due to a lack of advertising as a result of the recession.

== Browne regains control in 2017 ==
In April 2017 it was announced that Vincent Browne had regained control of the Magill title, after purchasing it from Business and Finance publisher Ian Hyland. The plan is to have a relaunched print edition initially of one-off specials, as well as online content.

== Contributors ==
Many staff and freelance writers from newspapers contribute to the magazine including the Sunday Independent's political commentator John Drennan, The Irish Times contributor Jim Duffy (who ceased his column when he became an advisor to the leader of the opposition in 2007) and an Irish government special adviser writing under the pseudonym Sean Sexton. Other people who have contributed to the new Magill include Fine Gael deputy leader Richard Bruton, former Labour deputy leader Liz McManus, former British Conservative Party minister Jonathan Aitken, right-wing retired United States diplomat George Dempsey and BBC Foreign Affairs Editor John Simpson. Michael O'Sullivan, biographer of Mary Robinson and Seán Lemass was Literary Editor when the magazine was edited by John Ryan and Emily O'Reilly.

The last incarnation of Magill was designed by Cobalt Design to make use of commissioned artwork as an important tool of communication. Issues feature several of Ireland's most established editorial illustrators, with work by Jon Berkeley; David Rooney; Kevin McSherry; Fintan Taite and Joven Kerekes.

Its December 2005 edition carried an interview with Taoiseach Bertie Ahern.
