= John Ryan (publisher) =

Irish publisher (21st century)

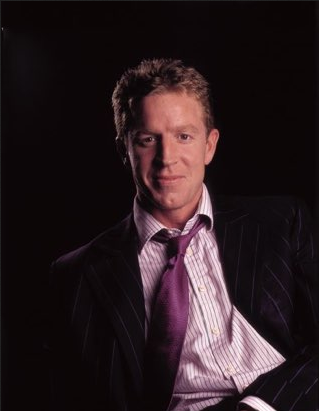
- Born: 22 December 1967
- Occupations: Journalist and publisher
- Employer: Self-employed
- Known for: VIP (magazine), TV Now, New York Dog (Magazines) This is Nightlive (Television) blogorrah.com, Broadsheet.ie (Website)
- Spouse: Single

John Ryan is an Irish journalist and publisher. He is a former editor of Magill and In Dublin. His publications include the magazines VIP and New York Dog (both with former business partner, Michael O'Doherty) and the websites blogorrah.com, and Broadsheet.ie. In 2009 Ryan also created and starred in a RTÉ Two comedy television show This is Nightlive, which mimicked the antics of Ireland's newscasters and other newsroom members.

== Early life ==
Ryan grew up in Monkstown, Dublin and was educated at C.B.C. Monkstown. A number of his relatives, including his father John Ryan Snr, were well known in the arts scene in Dublin. His grandfather, Séamus Ryan, was a Senator in the Irish Parliament whilst his aunt Kathleen Ryan was an actress.

== Career ==
=== Early work ===
Ryan started his career in journalism with a local newspaper in north London, The Hornsey Journal. Ryan served as a war correspondent during his early years, reporting from Bosnia, Rwanda and apartheid South Africa. He was also editor of Magill magazine and The Sunday Times Culture section in addition to journalism with the Sunday Independent.

=== Breaking the Charlie Haughey and Terry Keane affair ===
In 1999 whilst editing the Culture section and working as a journalist at The Sunday Times, Ryan broke the story of the long-time affair between the former Taoiseach and Terry Keane, a columnist of The Keane Edge at The Sunday Independent. Keane had left The Sunday Independent on bad terms and Ryan, who had worked with her at The Sunday Independent, approached her to sell her story to The Times.

=== The Sunday Supplement ===
Ryan briefly hosted a Sunday morning current affairs show on Radio Ireland (later Today FM) entitled The Sunday Supplement. Ryan was succeeded as host by journalist Sam Smyth.

=== Publishing ===
Ryan co-founded VIP with former business partner Michael O'Doherty.

In 2001 Ryan launched GI magazine, Ireland's first gay lifestyle glossy. The magazine, which struggled to find advertisers and was closed in 2003, was notable for a billboard campaign depicting two footballers wearing opposing GAA colours and French kissing one another. Ryan's publishing company also owned the publishing venture Stars on Sunday which folded following failure to meet projected circulation figures. He then set up the New York Dog magazine, which he promoted on The Late Late Show, and a New York City-based website, blogorrah.com, which was described by the Irish Independent as "a sort of Phoenix without portfolio". The site was edited by Derek O'Connor but stopped filing new posts in July 2007.

=== This is Nightlive ===
Ryan returned to Ireland in 2008 to pitch his idea for a new television show to RTÉ. The show, This is Nightlive, launched in January 2009. It was satirical in nature and parodied a typical newsroom fronted by the fictional anchorman Johnny Hansom. Hansom (played by Ryan) and his team who present a Lifestyle News show on which they claim that "they are the news". Ryan modelled his show on The Colbert Report, a show with a cult following on American cable television.

=== Broadsheet.ie ===
In June 2010 Ryan and writer Niall Murphy launched Broadsheet.ie as a "news source for the bewildered," combining news, satire, music, art, and missing dogs/cats/bikes. It was voted Best Web-Only Publication in the Realex Fire Web Awards 2014. Ryan posted under the pseudonym "Bodger" as well as under his real name on the site. In June 2022, Broadsheet announced that it was ending its operations; many commenters on the website attributed its demise to alienating readers through the prominence it gave to conspiracy theories around COVID-19 and Russia's 2022 war against Ukraine.
