= Michael O'Doherty (publisher) =

Irish publisher

- Occupation: Publisher
- Known for: publishing business

Michael O'Doherty is a television talent judge, newspaper writer and the publisher of the VIP magazine group in Ireland.

O'Doherty's publishing business includes magazines such as VIP, TV Now, Kiss, Stellar and The Dubliner Magazine.

== New York Dog collapse ==
The idea for the magazine came from a joint business venture by Irish magazine publishers O'Doherty and John Ryan. Ryan's publishing company initially owned the publishing venture Stars on Sunday which folded with losses, whilst O'Doherty still maintained VIP. New York Dog magazine was promoted on The Late Late Show, and was set up alongside a New York City-based website, blogorrah.com, which was described by the Irish Independent as "a sort of Phoenix without portfolio". The site was edited by Derek O'Connor but stopped filing new posts in July 2007. Its closure, and that of New York Dog, was extensively covered by the Irish media, many of whose members had been satirised on Blogorrah.

== The Dubliner failure ==
O'Doherty also failed to make a success of The Dubliner magazine, purchased by him in 2008, which ceased publication as an independent magazine in January 2012, eleven years to the day after the first edition hit the newsstands. The Dubliner's last editor was Martha Connolly.
