= New York Dog =

- Issue #1
- Editor: Leslie Padgett
- First issue: September 2004
- Final issue: April 2007
- Company: Gatsby Publishing
- Country: United States
- Based in: New York City
- Language: English

New York Dog was an unsuccessful lifestyle magazine for animal lovers based upon women's fashion and lifestyle magazines but instead featuring dogs, owned by Michael O'Doherty and John Ryan. Before its collapse the magazine was lauded by respected international publications such as The New York Times. It was based in New York City and intended to sit alongside Vogue and Cosmopolitan. Gatsby Publishing was the owner of New York Dog began publishing in September 2004. The frequency of publication was anticipated to be a ninety-six page glossy every two months. Design and production took place at Michael O'Doherty's VIP offices in Dublin, whilst content and advertising was sought in Manhattan. The magazine had a sister publication, The Hollywood Dog. The last issue of New York Dog was published in April 2007.

== Features ==
The New York Times praised New York Dog for its quirky features such as "The 10 Best Walks in Manhattan" and guidelines on how to keep a dog in a custody battle as well as plans to include photo shoots of dog haute couture, dog horoscopes and obituaries, dog dieting tips and pop psychology advice for dogs. An alternative view on its subject was sought in the shape of prominent New York journalist Jimmy Breslin, who dislikes dogs. He wrote a column titled "The Back Yard" and "Who Let The Dogs Out".

== Articles ==
- "For Dogs in New York, a Glossy Look at Life" - The New York Times
- "A new publication on Flea Street" - The Irish Echo
