= Kathryn Thomas =

Irish television presenter (born 1979)

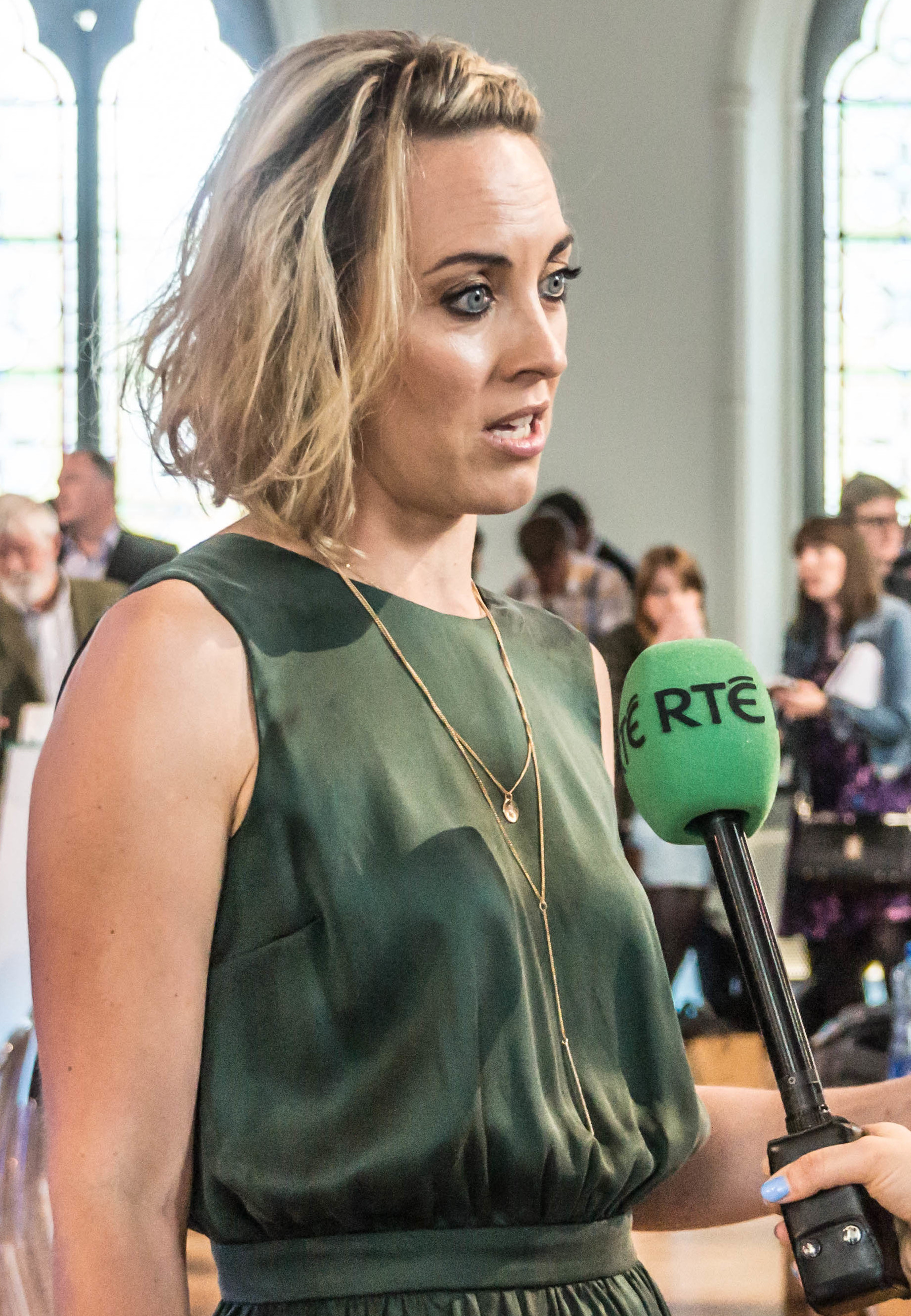
- Thomas interviewed at RTÉ's winter season launch in 2015
- Born: 20 January 1979 (age 47); Carlow, Ireland
- Education: English, Sociology and Information Studies
- Alma mater: King's Hospital School University College Dublin (UCD)
- Occupation: Presenter
- Employer(s): Q102 & RTÉ
- Agent: Noel Kelly
- Known for: Rapid, No Frontiers, Winning Streak, Operation Transformation, The Voice of Ireland
- Children: 2

Kathryn Thomas (born 20 January 1979) is an Irish television presenter.

Thomas won her first contract with RTÉ to co-present the children's television programme Rapid with Jason Sherlock in the 1990s. From there she went on to present No Frontiers, touring the world to promote various countries on RTÉ Television.

== Early life ==
Thomas attended the national school on the Green Road, Carlow and began her secondary school years in St Leo's College, Carlow. In her second year, she moved to The King's Hospital in Dublin as a boarder. She studied arts (English, Sociology and Information Studies) at University College Dublin but left before finishing as she won a contract to present the children's television programme Rapid. She also took London Guildhall acting exams to Grade 8.

== Career ==
=== Television ===
Thomas's break into television came when she co-presented Rapid, a youth sports show, with Dublin GAA star Jason Sherlock during the 1990s.

Thomas worked on the television series No Frontiers, which included assignment stories about boomeranging in Australia, bungee jumping in New Zealand, child trafficking in Namibia, and American football.

In 2008, Thomas co-presented Winning Streak: Dream Ticket with Aidan Power. From 2009, she co-presented the show with Marty Whelan. She left Winning Streak in December 2011.

In 2011, she became the new presenter of Operation Transformation on RTÉ One. In August 2011, it was announced that she would host The Voice of Ireland, the Irish version of The Voice.

In 2023, it was announced that Thomas would co-host the annual Rose of Tralee festival alongside the festival's regular host Dáithí Ó Sé, marking the first time that a duo would host the event.

=== Radio ===
Thomas has stepped in for John Murray, Ray D'Arcy, and Ryan Tubridy on RTÉ Radio 1. Thomas also has hosted an RTÉ Radio 1 quiz show and presented some RTÉ Radio 1 specials like Wish You Were Here and Driving Home for Christmas with Kathryn Thomas. She was also a reporter for RTÉ Radio 1 when Operation Transformation was on each year during its run. Thomas made her RTÉ Radio 1 debut in June 2010.

In February 2025, she became the presenter of the weekday breakfast show on Dublin's Q102 from 7am to 10am daily, called The Morning Show with Kathryn Thomas.

== Controversies ==
=== Finger wagging incident ===
In February 2012, Thomas stormed the stage during a performance by Alabama 3 at the 9th Irish Film & Television Awards, and wagged her finger at the rock band after they sang a song with the lyrics "fuck the police". She accused the band of inciting people to violence.

=== Peugeot deal ===
Thomas became a "brand ambassador" for Peugeot in June 2023, a deal arranged by her agent, Noel Kelly of NK Management. This began with her promotion of the Peugeot 308. The deal proved controversial as it coincided with revelations about Ryan Tubridy's extra wages. The deal was publicised further in July 2023 as those revelations continued.

== Personal life ==
Thomas, had a five-year relationship with Garda Enda Waters, which ended in July 2012. She has been dating businessman Padraig McLoughlin since mid-2013.

In 2017, she announced through Instagram that she and McLoughlin were expecting their first child together. In March 2018, she had her first daughter, Ellie McLoughlin. She announced on Instagram in June 2021 that she and McLoughlin were expecting their second child, and gave birth to her second daughter, Grace McLoughlin, in October 2021. She lives in Inchicore.

Thomas revealed in 2015 that a series of shooting stars inked on the inside of her lower left arm were not tattoos but were in fact transfers, as she was scared to get a real tattoo.

== Awards ==
In 2005, Thomas won the Travel Extra Irish Travel Writer of the Year.

In 2008, she won the Sony Bravia TV Personality of the Year at the Irish Film and Television Awards (IFTAs) in Dublin, as well as Best Female Presenter at the TV Now Awards.

In February 2012, she came third in a poll to find Ireland's most desirable Valentines.
