= Derek O'Connor (journalist) =

Irish writer and filmmaker

Derek O'Connor is an Irish writer and filmmaker, and one half (with Ian Whelan) of the award-winning film-making duo Doris/Magee. Their film Ponydance: An Scannan won a 2014 Celtic Media Award, in the Young People's category. His short documentary The Prince of Ballyfermot won the 2015 Ulster Media Award. O'Connor has also written for a number of TV shows, including several episodes of the BAFTA and IFTA-winning CBBC children's series Roy.

He was Commissioning Editor of Irish style magazine dSIDE, and has written about popular culture for The Irish Times, The Sunday Tribune, The Donegal Democrat, The Sunday Business Post, Sight & Sound, V Magazine, Dazed & Confused, Tokion and Image Magazine. While based in New York, he co-created and edited the cult satirical website blogorrah.com, and remains a contributor to its successor, broadsheet.com. He also edited U2's fan club magazine Propaganda and Film West Magazine.

O'Connor's play Maladjusted/Misappropriated was performed at the 2008 New York International Fringe Festival, and at the Earagail Arts Festival in County Donegal. In 2013, he adapted the classic silent film Greed for Bedrock Theatre Company, and in 2014 and 2015 wrote back-to-back Christmas shows for Lyric Theatre Belfast. In 2016, he participated in the 24 Hour Play Challenge at Dublin's Abbey Theatre.

He spent two years as the assistant director of the Letterkenny Arts Centre (now Regional Cultural Centre, Letterkenny), and another two as the director of the Darklight Festival, where he conceived Darklight's 4-Day movie project, Dublin: The Movie.

== Education ==
O'Connor was educated at Templeogue College, Dublin, and studied at Ulster University, gaining a master's degree.
