= Stars on Sunday (newspaper) =

Irish tabloid newspaper

Stars on Sunday was an unsuccessful Sunday tabloid newspaper in Ireland which went bankrupt in May 2003 just two months after its launch the previous March.

== History ==
Stars on Sunday was funded by the business partnership of John Donnelly and Diarmuid Lennon, who owned the publishing company Ashville Media as well as by fellow publishers John Ryan and Melanie Morris. Donnelly and Lennon each owned 24.5% of the newspaper whilst the remainder was owned by the Ryan and Morris partnership. A total of approximately €500,000 was invested in the title.

The newspaper was aimed at a mainly female under-45 readership, with a Joint National Readership Research report indicating that 53% of Irish women read a daily newspaper, but 66% read a Sunday newspaper. Ireland on Sunday (now the Irish Mail on Sunday) was named as having the most potential for loss of readership when Stars on Sunday was announced. The Star newspaper accused Stars on Sunday of using a title similar to its own but on seeking legal advice was told that there was no reason to pursue legal action.

Stars on Sunday branded itself as Ireland's first all-colour newspaper. The first issue had a print run of 105,000, if the 5,000 figures to be distributed free at Dublin's DART stations were included. John Donnelly, the co-managing director of Ashville Media and one of the backers of the newspaper suggested it would initially have a circulation of 50,000, which he thought achievable in the first six months of availability. He expected the first issue to sell between 60,000 and 70,000. MCM media buyer Debbie Kiely was skeptical of such a proposal, saying the newspaper would be doing well if it had 25,000 to 30,000 sales in its first few issues. Jason Nebenzahl of Initiative Media ominously suggested that "time will tell".

Stars on Sunday was edited by 26-year-old Aoife Byrne, who had spent the previous four years at the magazine and design company New Century Publishing where she edited, designed and wrote. Kellogg's, Warner Brothers, Tipperary Crystal and Wella were amongst the advertisers who had signed up for the first issue, with €150,000 being spent on promotional expenses and a planned further €200,000 marked out to be spent on radio promotions over the first year of existence. Raidió Teilifís Éireann (RTÉ) had even planned to run a True Lives documentary about the launch on its television schedule during the first September of its existence.

== Denouement ==
After its failure John Donnelly announced his resignation from his publishing company, Ashville Media and was reported as having left Ireland and travelled to Portugal in a move to minimise his tax bill. His business partner Diarmuid Lennon was left as the sole managing director of the company, known for its production of magazines, yearbooks and diaries. Donnelly was said to have taken advantage of the Portuguese tax regime where no capital gains tax is payable on the sale of shares in a company owned for more than twelve months. However Irish residents moving to Portugal must not return to Ireland for five years to avail of this tax saving. A previous example of these savings by an Irish businessman was communications tycoon Denis O'Brien, who is believed to have saved €63 million in capital gains tax when he moved to Portugal in 2000 after selling his mobile telephone, telecommunications and internet company Esat Telecommunications Limited (now BT Ireland) for €292 million.
