= VIP (magazine) =

Irish magazine and publishing group

- Publisher: Michael O'Doherty
- First issue: 1999
- Country: Ireland
- Based in: Dublin
- Language: English

VIP (standing for Very Important Person) is both the title of a magazine and a publishing group owned by the Irish publisher Michael O'Doherty.

The VIP group currently consists of three titles (VIP, TV Now, Stellar) and four companies (Minjara Limited ("Minjara"), Vymura Limited ("Vymura"), Barndee Limited ("Barndee") and VIP Publishing Limited). Minjara underwent liquidation in 2014.

VIP magazine was launched in 1999, the second of O'Doherty's business ventures with his former business partner John Ryan, whom he subsequently bought out with loans from members of his family. It features Irish celebrities in a fashion portrayed and displayed in a similar fashion to that of British publications such as Hello! and OK!. Its circulation was estimated at 35,000 in 2008. The magazine gives its name to the annual VIP Style Awards, originally held at Dublin's Shelbourne Hotel, and since 2013 at the Marker Hotel.
