= Dáithí Ó Sé =

Irish television presenter (born 1976)

- Born: Dáithí Mícheál Ó Sé; 2 June 1976 (age 50); Feothanach, County Kerry, Ireland
- Education: Mary Immaculate College
- Occupation: TV Presenter
- Years active: 1999–present
- Employer(s): RTÉ & TG4
- Notable credits: TG4 Weather; The All Ireland Talent Show; The Rose of Tralee; The Daily Show; Today
- Spouse: Rita Talty (m. 2012)
- Children: 1
- Father: Maidhc Dainín Ó Sé

Dáithí Mícheál Ó Sé (pronounced [ˈd̪ˠaːhiː ˈmʲiːçaːl̪ˠ oː ˈʃeː]; born 2 June 1976) is an Irish daytime television presenter. He rose to national fame as a continuity announcer and weather presenter with TG4 and currently hosts RTÉ One's Today, alongside Maura Derrane and Sinead Kennedy. He is also the current host of the Rose of Tralee and hosts a chat show on TG4, Seal Le Dáithí.

His career has included stints as a teacher in Gaelscoil an Ghoirt Álainn, butcher, bouncer, ferry driver around the Blasket Islands, ringmaster with Duffy's Circus, singing on Charity You're a Star, surviving in remotest Connemara for Celebrities Go Wild, Livin' with Lucy, judging on The All Ireland Talent Show, and one-off presenting gigs on the likes of The Panel and Winning Streak.

In 2010, he succeeded Ray D'Arcy as host of the Rose of Tralee, and married one of the Roses in 2012.

== Early life ==
Born in Feothanach in West Kerry, Ó Sé is the second youngest of five children born to musician and author Maidhc Dainín Ó Sé and his wife Caitlín. He was educated at the local national school before later attending Dingle CBS. He subsequently completed a Bachelor of Arts in Irish and History at Mary Immaculate College in Limerick and qualified as a secondary school teacher. He is a native Irish speaker.

After leaving university Ó Sé worked as a teacher in Gaelscoil an Ghoirt Álainn (a Gaelscoil in Cork), a butcher, a bouncer, a ferry driver around the Blasket Islands, and even a short stint as a ringmaster with Duffy's Circus.

== Media career ==
Ó Sé had just completed his third level education and was working as a ferry driver in Kerry when he joined TG4 in 1999. He began his television career on a part-time basis as a continuity announcer and weather presenter with the Irish language station.

In 2001 Ó Sé started working full-time for TG4. While continuing as a continuity announcer, he quickly became one of the station's most recognisable presenters. In 2002 he presented Féilte, a ten-part summer festival programme which also featured two Christmas specials from Boston and New York City. A second series of Féilte was broadcast in 2003.

Ó Sé took over as host of Cleamhnas, a blind date-style programme in 2004. Later in the year he showed his versatility when presented Coinne Le, a live Saturday night chat show, while also fronting the stations live coverage of the Galway Races. He hosted TG4's coverage of the Galway Races again in 2005.

In 2006 Ó Sé began three seasons as host of Glór Tíre, a country music talent show and in 2007 he presented Dáithí ar Route 66 a travel programme about his journey on the famous U.S. highway.

He was a contestant on Charity You're a Star in 2006. In 2007, he appeared on Celebrities Go Wild, an RTÉ reality television show in which eight celebrities had to fend for themselves in the wilds of rural Connemara.

He was a guest presenter on The Panel in 2008. He was one of the judges on RTÉ programme The All Ireland Talent Show. He represented competitors from the West of Ireland and won the first series in 2009 with The Mulkerrin Brothers, a trad group from the Aran Islands.

On 17 May 2010, it was announced that he would host the Rose of Tralee contest for 2010. He became the 11th host of the contest and the first Kerryman to compère. He was afforded a homecoming fit for a Sam Maguire Cup winner. He succeeded radio broadcaster Ray D'Arcy, who presented the competition on RTÉ television for five years from 2004 to 2009.

On 28 August 2010, he started a new RTÉ 2fm radio show on Saturday mornings from 10am until midday. He co-presented The Daily Show with Claire Byrne on RTÉ One until the programme was axed in 2012.

Since November 2012, he has been one of the presenters of RTÉ's daytime show Today on RTÉ 1.

Since January 2014, Ó Sé has also hosted various shows on TG4 on a part-time basis such as Fuaimrian Mo Shaoil, Gradaim Ceoil until they were both axed

In September 2018, it was announced that Ó Sé would host a new chat show on TG4 every Thursday Night called Seal Le Dáithí.

In 2025, Ó Sé was listed at the 8th most paid presenter in RTÉ, earning €196,885 from the broadcaster in 2024, this was his first time on the list.

== Personal life ==
On 12 July 2012, Ó Sé married the 2008 New Jersey Rose, Rita Talty. On 17 March 2014, his wife gave birth to a boy, Mícheál Óg.

== Television credits ==
- 2014 Stood in for Marty Whelan (who was providing his annual Eurovision Song Contest commentary from Copenhagen, Denmark) yet again as co-host of Winning Streak
- 2014 Presenter of Fuaimrian Mo Shaoil on TG4.
- 2013 Stood in for Marty Whelan (who was providing his annual Eurovision Song Contest commentary from Malmö, Sweden) again as co-host of Winning Streak
- 2012 Stood in for Marty Whelan (who was providing his annual Eurovision Song Contest commentary from Baku, Azerbaijan) as co-host of Winning Streak
- 2010 - Host of the Rose of Tralee on RTÉ, a role he has continued each year since.
- 2009 2010 Judge on The All Ireland Talent Show on RTÉ
- 2009 Guest on The Lucy Kennedy Show on RTÉ
- 2008 Guest presenter on The Panel on RTÉ
- 2008 Livin' with Lucy on RTÉ
- 2008 Full-time weather and continuity presenter on TG4
- 2007 Presenter on the Full Set traditional music series, on RTÉ
- 2007 Contestant on Celebrities Go Wild, a charity reality series, on RTÉ
- 2007 Presenter of Dáithí ar Route 66 (TG4, travel/road trip across US)
- 2007 – 2009 presenter of Glór Tíre
- 2006 Contestant on Charity You're a Star, reality singing contest, on RTÉ
- 2006 Glór Tíre
- 2004/2005 Galway Races – Anchor man for a 3 œ hour live broadcast over three days.
- 2004 Coinne le – Saturday night LIVE chat show 10 programmes
- 2003 Feilte – 10 Summer Festival programme plus one hour long special from N.Y. on TG4
- 2003 Cleamhnas – 13 part Blind date shows, on TG4
- 2003 Gradam Ceoil – TG4's traditional music awards from University of Limerick Concert Hall
- 2002 Feilte – 10 Summer festival programme plus two Christmas specials from N.Y and Boston, on TG4
- 2001 Gradam Ceoil – TG4 traditional music awards from the Cork opera House
- 1999–2001 Part-time weather-man and continuity announcer on TG4, Ireland's Irish-language station
