= List of programmes broadcast by Virgin Media Television (Ireland) =

Current and former television programmes broadcast on Virgin Media Television (Republic of Ireland), formerly "TV3 Group".

== Current (as of January 2026) ==
=== News and current affairs ===
- (Republic of Ireland) The Tonight Show (2017–present)
- (Republic of Ireland) The Group Chat
- (Republic of Ireland) Virgin Media News at 12.30
- (Republic of Ireland) Virgin Media News at 5.30 (2001–present, rebranded: The 5.30, 2012–2017)
- (Republic of Ireland) Virgin Media News at 7.00 (2015–2017, 2018–2022 [8pm], 2022-present [7pm])

=== Home produced shows ===
- (Republic of Ireland) Deception
- (Republic of Ireland) Don't Look Back in Anger
- (Republic of Ireland) Gogglebox Ireland
- (Republic of Ireland) Ireland AM (1999–present)
- (Republic of Ireland) The Restaurant
- (Republic of Ireland) The Six O'Clock Show
- (Republic of Ireland) Faithless
- (Republic of Ireland) A rebel education
- (Republic of Ireland) Fanning at Whelans
- (Republic of Ireland) What’s The Story?
- (Republic of Ireland) The Salvage Squad with Brian Dowling
- (Republic of Ireland) The Big Interview

=== British shows ===
==== From ITV ====
- (United Kingdom) The 1% Club
- (United Kingdom) Agatha Christie's Marple (reruns)
- (United Kingdom) Agatha Christie's Poirot (reruns)
- (United Kingdom) Alphabetical
- (United Kingdom) The Bay
- (United Kingdom) Black Work
- (United Kingdom) Big Brother UK
- (United Kingdom) Britain's Got Talent (2007–present)
- (United Kingdom) Britain's Got More Talent (2007–present)
- (United Kingdom) Catchphrase
- (United Kingdom) Celebrity Big Brother UK
- (United Kingdom) Cooking with the Stars
- (United Kingdom) Coronation Street (2001–2014, 2016–present)
- (United Kingdom) Cracker (reruns)
- (United Kingdom) The Chase (2009–present)
- (United Kingdom) The Cube (reruns)
- (United Kingdom) Dancing on Ice (reruns)
- (United Kingdom) Emmerdale (2001–2014, 2016–present)
- (United Kingdom) Guess This House (reruns)
- (United Kingdom) Heartbeat (reruns)
- (United Kingdom) I Fought the Law
- (United Kingdom) I'm a Celebrity...Get Me Out of Here! (2002-2014, 2017-present)
- (United Kingdom) Jeopardy (since 2024)
- (United Kingdom) The Jonathan Ross Show
- (United Kingdom) Limitless Win
- (United Kingdom) The Loch (reruns)
- (United Kingdom) The Long Call (reruns)
- (United Kingdom) Long Lost Family (2015 version) (2011–present)
- (United Kingdom) Loose Women
- (United Kingdom) Love Island (2015 version) (2015–present)
- (United Kingdom) Mr Selfridge (reruns)
- (United Kingdom) Mrs Biggs (reruns)
- (United Kingdom) Moneyball
- (United Kingdom) My Mum, Your Dad
- (United Kingdom) Ridley
- (United Kingdom) The Royal (reruns)
- (United Kingdom) Tell Me Everything
- (United Kingdom) This Morning (2001-present)
- (United Kingdom) Tipping Point (2013–present)
- (United Kingdom) A Touch of Frost (reruns)
- (United Kingdom) The Voice UK
- (United Kingdom) Vera
- (United Kingdom) Wheel of Fortune (since 2024)
- (United Kingdom) Who Wants to Be a Millionaire?
- (United Kingdom) Who's Doing the Dishes? (reruns)
- (United Kingdom) Wycliffe (reruns)

==== From Channel 5 ====
- (United Kingdom) Autopsy: The Last Hours of...
- (United Kingdom) The Cuckoo
- (United Kingdom) The Game

==== From the BBC ====
- (United Kingdom) Blankety Blank (2020)
- (United Kingdom) Bridge of Lies (2022)
- (United Kingdom) Bodyguard (reruns)
- (United Kingdom) The Finish Line
- (United Kingdom) The Graham Norton Show
- (United Kingdom) I Kissed a Girl
- (United Kingdom) Mum
- (United Kingdom) Noughts + Crosses
- (United Kingdom) Poldark (reruns)
- (United Kingdom) Shetland
- (United Kingdom) Think Tank (reruns)

==== From UKTV ====
- (United Kingdom) Impossible Engineering

=== North American shows ===
- (United States) Autopsy USA
- (United States) Below Deck
- (United States) Chicago Fire (reruns)
- (United States) Friends (reruns)
- (United States) Gilmore Girls (reruns, also on TG4)
- (United States) Good Witch (reruns)
- (United States) Hell's Kitchen
- (United States) Judge Judy (reruns)
- (United States) Law & Order: Special Victims Unit
- (United States) MasterChef (reruns)
- (United States) Million Dollar Listing New York
- (United States) The Real Housewives
- (Canada) Schitt's Creek (reruns)
- (United States) Top Chef (reruns)
- (United States) Vanderpump Rules
- (United States) Young Sheldon

=== Australian & New Zealand shows ===
- (Australia) Bump
- (Australia) My Market Kitchen (series 5-8) (reruns)
- The Chase Australia
- (Australia) Thank God You're Here (since series 5)
- Think Tank Australia (reruns)

=== Sport ===
- (Australia) AFL & AFL Women's (Aussie Rules)
- (European Union) Champions League Live (2001–2004 & 2008–present)
- (European Union) Champions League Magazine (2001–2004 & 2008–present)
- (United Kingdom) British Horse Racing Rights including Grand National (shown via ITV) (2017–present)
- (Republic of Ireland) (England) (Scotland) (Wales) (France) (Italy) RBS 6 Nations (2018–present)
- (United States) (United Kingdom) Super Bowl/NFL (shown via Channel 5) (2024-present)
- (Republic of Ireland) (Northern Ireland) League of Ireland (2001–2008: rights transferred to RTÉ Sport, 2008-2025, shared with RTÉ, 2025-present, all games.)

== Former (as of January 2026) ==
=== News and current affairs ===
- (Republic of Ireland) Agenda (1999–2004)
- (Republic of Ireland) First Edition (1999–2001)
- (Republic of Ireland) Midweek
- (Republic of Ireland) News Tonight
- (Republic of Ireland) TV3 News @ 6 (1998–1999)
- (Republic of Ireland) TV3 News @ 6.30 (2001–2005)
- (Republic of Ireland) TV3 News @ 7 (1999–2000)

=== Home produced shows ===
- (Republic of Ireland) 24 Hours to Kill
- (Republic of Ireland) Activity Breaks (2006–2007)
- (Republic of Ireland) Algorithm (2015)
- (Republic of Ireland) Animal A&E
- (Republic of Ireland) The Apprentice (2008–2011)
- (Republic of Ireland) Battle of the Bridesmaids
- (Republic of Ireland) The Big Deal
- (Republic of Ireland) Blackmarket Ireland
- (Republic of Ireland) The Box
- (Republic of Ireland) The Brendan Courtney Show (2005–2006)
- (Republic of Ireland) Celebrity Head Chef (2011)
- (Republic of Ireland) Celebrity Salon
- (Republic of Ireland) Championship Throw-In (2008–2010)
- (Republic of Ireland) Come Dine With Me
- (Republic of Ireland) Crimes That Shook Ireland
- (Republic of Ireland) Deal or No Deal (2009–2010)
- (Republic of Ireland) Driving Me Crazy
- (Republic of Ireland) Driving Seat
- (Republic of Ireland) Dublin Airport: Life Stories
- (Republic of Ireland) Dublin Wives
- (Republic of Ireland) The Dunphy Show (2003)
- (Republic of Ireland) Family Fortunes (2012–2014)
- (Republic of Ireland) Friday Late with Vincent Browne
- (Republic of Ireland) A Game of Two Halves (1999)
- (Republic of Ireland) Head Chef
- (Republic of Ireland) Hen Nights
- (Republic of Ireland) The Holiday Show (2013)
- (Republic of Ireland) Ireland's Beauty Queens
- (Republic of Ireland) Ireland Caught on Camera
- (Republic of Ireland) Ireland's Missing Mum's
- (Republic of Ireland) Ireland's Pampered Pets
- (Republic of Ireland) Ireland's Ultimate Debutante
- (Republic of Ireland) Junior Head Chef
- (Republic of Ireland) Lawless Ireland
- (Republic of Ireland) The Lie (2014)
- (Republic of Ireland) Marymount Hospice
- (Republic of Ireland) Midday (2008–2016)
- (Republic of Ireland) Mastermind (2011–2012)
- (Republic of Ireland) The Morning Show with Sybil & Martin (2009–2013)
- (Republic of Ireland) Neville's Doorstep Challenge
- (Republic of Ireland) Nick's Bistro
- (Republic of Ireland) The Offside Show
- (Republic of Ireland) Paddies Down Under
- (Republic of Ireland) Paul Connolly Investigates...
- (Republic of Ireland) Play TV (2009–2010)
- (Republic of Ireland) Popcorn
- (Republic of Ireland) The Property Game
- (Republic of Ireland) Red Rock
- (Republic of Ireland) School Run
- (Republic of Ireland) S.O.S.– Save Our Shops
- (Republic of Ireland) Sports Tonight (1998–2009)
- (Republic of Ireland) Stuart's Kitchen
- (Republic of Ireland) Style Wars
- (Republic of Ireland) Take Me Out Ireland (2010–2013)
- (Republic of Ireland) Tallafornia (2011–2013)
- (Republic of Ireland) Tallafornia: The After Party LIVE
- (Republic of Ireland) Temple Street Children's Hospital
- (Republic of Ireland) The Tenements
- (Republic of Ireland) (United Kingdom) (Canada) The Tudors
- (Republic of Ireland) The Weakest Link (2001–2002)
- (Republic of Ireland) X-Posé (2007–2016)

=== British shows ===
==== From ITV ====
- (United Kingdom) All Star Mr and Mrs
- (United Kingdom) Ant & Dec's Push the Button (2010–2011)
- (United Kingdom) Ant & Dec's Saturday Night Takeaway (2002–2009)
- (United Kingdom) At Home with the Braithwaites
- (United Kingdom) Bad Girls (2001–2006)
- (United Kingdom) The Biggest Loser
- (United Kingdom) Britannia High
- (United Kingdom) Broadchurch
- (United Kingdom) Downton Abbey
- (United Kingdom) Family Fortunes
- (United Kingdom) Footballers' Wives
- (United Kingdom) ...from Hell
- (United Kingdom) Hell's Kitchen
- (United Kingdom) I'm a Celebrity...Get Me Out of Here! (2002–2014)
- (United Kingdom) I'm a Celebrity...Get Me Out of Here! NOW! (2002–2014)
- (United Kingdom) The Jeremy Kyle Show (2009–2014)
- (United Kingdom) The Krypton Factor (2007–2008)
- (United Kingdom) Law & Order: UK
- (United Kingdom) London's Burning
- (United Kingdom) Love Island (2005 version) (2005–2006)
- (United Kingdom) Minder
- (United Kingdom) The Only Way is Essex
- (United Kingdom) Parkinson
- (United Kingdom) PokerFace
- (United Kingdom) Popstar to Operastar
- (United Kingdom) Prime Suspect
- (United Kingdom) Rock Rivals
- (United Kingdom) The Royal Today
- (United Kingdom) Soapstar Superstar (2006–2007)
- (United Kingdom) Take Me Out
- (United Kingdom) Trinny & Susannah Undress...
- (United Kingdom) Ultimate Force
- (United Kingdom) Who Dares, Sings! (2008)
- (United Kingdom) Wild at Heart
- (United Kingdom) The X Factor
- (United Kingdom) The Xtra Factor
- (United Kingdom) You've Been Framed (2018–2022)

==== From Channel 4 ====
- (United Kingdom) 10 Years Younger
- (United Kingdom) Come Dine with Me (2010–2013)
- (United Kingdom) The F Word
- (United Kingdom) Hollyoaks (2006–2007)
- (United Kingdom) How Clean Is Your House?
- (United Kingdom) Supernanny
- (United Kingdom) Teachers
- (United Kingdom) Ultraviolet

==== From E4 ====
- (United Kingdom) Fonejacker

==== From Channel 5 ====
- (United Kingdom) Don't Stop Believing
- (United Kingdom) Family Affairs
- (United Kingdom) House Doctor
- (United Kingdom) When Paddy Met Sally

==== From the BBC ====
- (United Kingdom) DIY SOS
- (United Kingdom) Doctor Who (2005)
- (United Kingdom) Doctor Who: The Movie (2000)
- (United Kingdom) EastEnders (1998–2001)
- (United Kingdom) The Good Life (reruns)
- (United Kingdom) Hole in the Wall
- (United Kingdom) A Life of Grime
- (United Kingdom) Over the Rainbow
- (United Kingdom) Parkinson
- (United Kingdom) The Royle Family
- (United Kingdom) Snog Marry Avoid?
- (United Kingdom) Some Mothers Do 'Ave 'Em (reruns)
- (United Kingdom) What Not to Wear

==== From Living TV ====
- (United Kingdom) The Biggest Loser
- (United Kingdom) Most Haunted

=== North American shows ===
- (United States) 10 Years Younger
- (United States) 30 Rock
- (United States) 3rd Rock from the Sun
- (United States) 7th Heaven
- (United States) Accidentally on Purpose
- (United States) Aliens in America
- (United States) Ally McBeal
- (United States) American Dad!
- (United States) American Idol
- (United States) America's Got Talent
- (United States) America's Next Top Model
- (United States) Angel
- (United States) Arrested Development
- (United States) Ask Harriet
- (United States) The Beautiful Life: TBL
- (United States) Beavis and Butt-Head
- (United States) Better with You
- (United States) The Big Bang Theory
- (United States) The Biggest Loser
- (United States) Bob's Burgers
- (United States) The Bold and The Beautiful
- (United States) Bionic Woman
- (United States) Buffy the Vampire Slayer
- (United States) Bull
- (United States) Cagney & Lacey
- (United States) Charmed
- (United States) Chicago Hope
- (United States) Chuck
- (United States) City Guys
- (United States) The Cleveland Show
- (United States) The Closer
- (United States) Committed
- (United States) Conan
- (United States) Crisis
- (United States) Crossing Jordan
- (United States) CSI: Crime Scene Investigation
- (United States) CSI: Miami
- (United States) Cupid
- (United States) Curb Your Enthusiasm
- (United States) Dallas (2012–2014)
- (United States) Dancing with the Stars
- (United States) Daria
- (United States) Dave's World
- (United States) Dawson's Creek
- (United States) Dead Man's Gun
- (Canada) Degrassi: The Next Generation
- (United States) Dexter
- (United States) Dilbert
- (United States) Dirt
- (United States) The Ellen DeGeneres Show
- (United States) Everwood
- (United States) Everybody Hates Chris
- (United States) Everybody Loves Raymond
- (United States) Family Guy
- (United States) Fashion House
- (United States) Frasier
- (United States) Friday Night Lights
- (United States) Fringe
- (United States) Full House (reruns)
- (United States) Futurama
- (United States) F/X: The Series
- (United States) The Geena Davis Show
- (United States) Glee
- (United States) Gossip Girl
- (United States) Growing Pains (reruns)
- (United States) The Guardian
- (United States) Harry's Law
- (United States) Hart of Dixie
- (United States) (New Zealand) Hercules: The Legendary Journeys
- (United States) Heroes
- (United States) Hot Properties
- (United States) House
- (United States) How I Met Your Mother
- (United States) Huff
- (United States) Hung
- (United States) Ice Road Truckers
- (United States) In Treatment
- (United States) It's Always Sunny in Philadelphia
- (United States) JAG
- (United States) The Janice Dickinson Modeling Agency
- (United States) The Jeremy Kyle Show
- (United States) Jimmy Kimmel Live!
- (United States) Joey
- (United States) Judge Maria Lopez
- (United States) Judging Amy
- (United States) Just Shoot Me!
- (United States) The King of Queens
- (United States) Kyle XY
- (United States) Las Vegas
- (United States) Law & Order
- (United States) Law & Order: Criminal Intent
- (United States) Love Boat: The Next Wave
- (United States) Mad About You
- (United States) Malcolm in the Middle
- (United States) The Middle
- (United States) Mike & Molly
- (United States) Modern Family
- (United States) Moonlight
- (United States) My Name Is Earl
- (United States) NCIS
- (United States) NCIS: Los Angeles
- (United States) The Net
- (United States) The New Adventures of Old Christine
- (United States) NewsRadio
- (United States) Northern Exposure
- (United States) Numbers
- (United States) The Office
- (United States) The Oprah Winfrey Show
- (United States) Our House (reruns)
- (United States) Paradise Hotel
- (United States) Party of Five
- (United States) Prime Suspect
- (United States) Providence
- (United States) Rachael Ray
- (United States) Raines
- (United States) Reign
- (United States) Ricki Lake
- (United States) Ripley's Believe It or Not!
- (United States) Rude Awakening
- (United States) Scrubs
- (United States) Seinfeld
- (United States) Seven Days
- (United States) Sex and the City
- (United States) The Shield
- (United States) Sliders
- (United States) Something So Right
- (United States) The Sopranos
- (United States) South Park
- (United States) Southland
- (United States) Starsky & Hutch
- (United States) Star Trek: Deep Space Nine
- (United States) Star Trek: The Next Generation
- (United States) The Steve Wilkos Show
- (United States) Strong Medicine
- (United States) (Canada) Student Bodies
- (United States) Sunset Beach
- (United States) Supernatural
- (United States) The Swan
- (United States) Swingtown
- (United States) Team Knight Rider
- (United States) That 70's Show
- (United States) Tim Gunn's Guide to Style
- (United States) Tru Calling
- (United States) Two and a Half Men
- (United States) Ugly Betty
- (United States) The Unit
- (United States) USA High
- (United States) V
- (United States) V.I.P.
- (United States) Walker, Texas Ranger
- (United States) Wedding Band
- (Canada) Wedding SOS
- (United States) What About Joan?
- (United States) Will & Grace
- (United States) The Wire
- (United States) Without a Trace
- (United States) Wonderfalls
- (United States) World's Wildest Police Videos
- (United States) The X Factor (US) (2011–2013)
- (United States) The Young and The Restless

=== Australian & New Zealand shows ===
- (Australia) All Saints
- (Australia) The Block
- (Australia) Bondi Rescue
- (Australia) Breakers
- (United States) (New Zealand) Hercules: The Legendary Journeys
- (Australia) Kath & Kim
- MasterChef Australia (reruns)
- (Australia) Nothing to Declare
- (New Zealand) Outrageous Fortune
- (Australia) Satisfaction
- (Australia) Underbelly

=== Children ===
- (United States) Aaahh!!! Real Monsters
- The adventures of Paddington bear
- (United States) The Adventures of Pete and Pete
- (Canada) Anatole
- Angelina ballerina
- Angry bird toons
- (Canada) (France) Animal Crackers
- (United Kingdom) Avenger Penguins
- Babar
- barney and friends
- (United States) The Brothers Flub
- (United States) Big Guy and Rusty the Boy Robot
- (Canada) (United States) Beast Machines: Transformers
- (Canada) (United States) Beast Wars: Transformers
- (Canada) Birdz
- Bob the builder
- (United States) Buster & Chauncey's Silent Night
- (Canada) (United States) (France) The Busy World of Richard Scarry
- Caillou
- (United Kingdom) (Canada) Captain Star
- (United States) Conan and the Young Warriors
- (United States) (Canada) Conan the Adventurer
- (Canada) D'Myna Leagues
- (United Kingdom) Dan Dare: Pilot of the Future
- (United States) Deck the Halls
- Doug
- Driver dan's story train
- (Canada) (Australia) Dumb Bunnies
- (United Kingdom) Father Christmas
- (France) (Canada) Flying Rhino Junior High
- (Canada) (United States) Galidor: Defenders of the Outer Dimension
- Ghosts of time
- (Republic of Ireland) Gimme 3
- (United States) Godzilla: The Series
- (United States) Harold and the Purple Crayon
- (United States) Heavy Gear: The Animated Series
- (United States) Hey Dude
- (United States) (United Kingdom) The Hot Rod Dogs and Cool Car Cats
- in the night garden
- Invader zim
- (United States) Jolly Old Saint Nicholas
- (United States) (France) The Legend of Calamity Jane
- Kablam
- Kipper
- Lala land
- little charmers
- (Germany) (Republic of Ireland) The Loggerheads
- my life as a teenage robot
- (United Kingdom) Mole in the Hole
- (United Kingdom) Mole's Christmas
- (Canada) (France) Mona the Vampire
- (United States) Phantom Investigators
- pingu
- (United Kingdom) Prince Cinders
- (United Kingdom) Professor Bubble
- (Canada) (France) The Animated World of Ripleys Believe it or Not
- rainbow ruby
- (United States) The Ren & Stimpy Show
- (United States) Rocko's Modern Life
- (United States) Roughnecks: Starship Troopers Chronicles
- rubbadubbers
- ruff ruff tweet and dave
- (United States) Santo Bugito
- (Australia) Search for Treasure Island
- (United States) Shining Time Station
- (United Kingdom) The Snowman
- (Canada) Space Cases
- (United States) (Canada) Salty's Lighthouse
- stella and sam
- teletubbies
- (United States) Transformers: Generation 2
- (United States) The Ugly Duckling's Christmas Wish
- the wiggles
- winx club
- (United States) We Wish You a Merry Christmas
- yo gabba gabba
- (United States) (New Zealand) Young Hercules

=== Sport ===
- (Republic of Ireland) Championship Live (2008–2013: rights transferred to Sky Sports)
- (European Union) Europa League Live (2009–2015: rights transferred to Setanta Sports Ireland)
- (United Kingdom) FA Cup Final Live (2015–2017)
- (Republic of Ireland) The GAA Show (2011–2013)
- (Republic of Ireland) League of Ireland (2001–2008: rights transferred to RTE Sport)
- (France) Rugby World Cup Live (2007)
