= 2000 in Irish television =

The following is a list of events relating to television in Ireland from 2000.

== Events ==
- 1 January – RTÉ presents Millennium Eve: Celebrate 2000, coverage of the turn of the millennium from 31 December 1999 into 1 January 2000. The programme is part of the international strand 2000 Today to celebrate the occasion.
- 13 March – Long running news and current affairs programme Nationwide begins its first ever transmission on RTÉ 1.
- 13 March – After a very long absence, Welsh children's stop-motion animated series Fireman Sam returns to air on Irish television with Network 2 screening it as part of Den2.
- 1 May – Doctor Who: The Movie, the television film based on the Doctor Who television series receives its very first broadcast on television in the Republic of Ireland. Starring Paul McGann as the Eighth Doctor, the film is transmitted on TV3 from 3:55 pm to 5:30 pm.
- 1 June – A new RTÉ Authority is appointed.
- 11 September – The UK broadcaster Granada Media plc agrees to acquire 45% of TV3 from the channel's original consortium as part of a deal giving TV3 the right to simulcast programming with ITV.
- Undated – RTÉ undergoes a programme of re-structuring.
- Undated – RTÉ establishes a Programme Development Fund to invest £25 million in indigenous programming over the next five years.
- Undated – By the end of 2000, RTÉ has a deficit of £11.23 million. Public funding for the broadcaster has been increased only once in the previous fifteen years.
- Undated – TV You is rebranded as UTV2.

== Debuts ==
=== RTÉ ===
- 1 January – 100 Years on RTÉ 1
- 5 January – The Grimleys on Network 2 (1999–2001)
- 10 January – The Wiggles on Network 2 (1998–2001)
- 17 January – Digimon on Network 2 (1999–2000)
- 22 January – The Tribe on Network 2 (1999–2005)
- 22 January – Redbeard on Network 2 (1997)
- 10 February – The Toothbrush Family on Network 2 (1998–1999)
- 10 February – Ketchup: Cats Who Cook on Network 2 (1998–1999)
- 14 February – Franklin on Network 2 (1997–2003)
- 13 March – Nationwide on RTÉ One (2000–present)
- 20 March – Pip the Appleseed Knight on Network 2 (1997–1999)
- 6 April – George and Martha on Network 2 (1999–2000)
- 22 April – The Powerpuff Girls on Network 2 (1998–2005)
- 30 April – The Adventures of Sam on Network 2 (1999)
- 3 May – Crash Zone on Network 2 (1999–2001)
- 12 May – Spider-Man Unlimited on Network 2 (1999–2001)
- 22 May – Grizzly Tales for Gruesome Kids on Network 2 (2000–2007, 2010–2012)
- 27 May – Mr. Wymi on Network 2 (1997–1999)
- 1 June – Third Watch on Network 2 (1999–2005)
- June – Power Rangers in Space on Network 2 (1999)
- 4 July – Batman Beyond on Network 2 (1999–2001)
- 8 July – NASCAR Racers on Network 2 (1999–2001)
- 11 July – Big Wolf on Campus on Network 2 (1999–2002)
- 11 September – 64 Zoo Lane on Network 2 (1999–2013)
- 11 September – Sheeep on Network 2 (2000–2001)
- 11 September – Rotten Ralph on Network 2 (1998–2001)
- 11 September – Foxbusters on Network 2 (1999–2000)
- 12 September – S Club 7 in Miami on Network 2 (1999)
- 12 September – Watership Down on Network 2 (1999–2001)
- 27 September – Off the Rails on RTÉ One (2000–present)
- 11 October – Who Wants to Be a Millionaire? on RTÉ One (2000–2002)
- 18 October – The Lionhearts on Network 2 (1998)
- 1 November – Paths to Freedom on Network 2 (2000)
- Undated – Seven Ages (2000)
- Undated – Dream Street on Network 2 (1999–2002)
- Undated – Popular on Network 2 (1999–2001)

=== TV3 ===
- 1 May – Doctor Who: The Movie (1996)
- 2 September – Mona the Vampire (1999–2003)
- 2 September – Big Guy and Rusty the Boy Robot (1999–2001)
- 2 September – Ripley's Believe It or Not! (1998)
- 25 December – Alice in Wonderland (1999)
- Undated – Angel (1999–2004)
- Undated – Malcolm in the Middle (2000–2006)
- Undated – Get Real (1999–2000)
- Undated – Roswell (1999–2002)

=== TG4 ===
- 17 April – Dragon Tales (1999–2005)
- 17 April – Rainbow Fish (1998–2000)
- 17 April – Little Monsters (1998–1999)
- 17 April – Freaky Stories (1997–2000)
- 17 April – Twipsy (1999)
- 18 April – Voltron: The Third Dimension (1998–2000)
- 22 April – Flipper & Lopaka (1999–2005)
- 1 September – Angela Anaconda (1999–2001)
- 1 September – Monster Rancher (1999–2001)
- 17 September – GAA Beo (2000–present)

== Changes of network affiliation ==
Shows	Moved from	Moved to
Fireman Sam	RTÉ One	Network 2
The Busy World of Richard Scarry	RTÉ One	TV3
Thunderbirds	RTÉ One	Network 2
Inspector Gadget	TG4	Network 2
Baby Bollies	Network 2	TG4

== Ongoing television programmes ==
=== 1960s ===
- RTÉ News: Nine O'Clock (1961–present)
- RTÉ News: Six One (1962–present)
- The Late Late Show (1962–present)

=== 1970s ===
- The Late Late Toy Show (1975–present)
- RTÉ News on Two (1978–2014)
- The Sunday Game (1979–present)

=== 1980s ===
- Glenroe (1983–2001)
- Dempsey's Den (1986–2010)
- Questions and Answers (1986–2009)
- Fair City (1989–present)
- RTÉ News: One O'Clock (1989–present)

=== 1990s ===
- Would You Believe (1990s–present)
- Winning Streak (1990–present)
- Challenging Times (1991–2001)
- Prime Time (1992–present)
- The Movie Show (1993–2001)
- No Disco (1993–2003)
- Nuacht RTÉ (1995–present)
- Fame and Fortune (1996–2006)
- Nuacht TG4 (1996–present)
- Ros na Rún (1996–present)
- Don't Feed the Gondolas (1997–2001)
- A Scare at Bedtime (1997–2006)
- The Premiership/Premier Soccer Saturday (1998–2013)
- Sports Tonight (1998–2009)
- TV3 News (1998–present)
- Bull Island (1999–2001)
- First Edition (1999–2001)
- Open House (1999–2004)
- Agenda (1999–2004)
- The View (1999–2011)
- Ireland AM (1999–present)
- Telly Bingo (1999–present)

== Ending this year ==
- May – Later on 2 (1997–2000)
- 1 December – Paths to Freedom (2000)
- 29 December – TV3 News @ 7 (1999–2000)
- 31 December – 100 Years
- Undated – 2Phat (1998–2000)

== See also ==
- 2001 in Ireland
