= 2022 in Irish television =

The following is a list of events relating to television in Ireland from 2022.

== Events ==
=== January ===
- 28 January – RTÉ One airs the first edition of The Late Late Show to feature a full studio audience since March 2020.

=== March ===
- 7 March – Virgin Media One launches the News at 7.00, a nightly news bulletin fronted by Caroline Twohig, while Coronation Street and Emmerdale are moved to new timeslots.
- 27 March – Nina Carberry and professional dance partner Pasquale La Rocca win series five of Dancing with the Stars.

=== April ===
- 11 April – Virgin Media Sport closes after four years on air.
- 12 April – Launch of Virgin Media More, a new channel exclusive to Virgin Media customers featuring first look at Irish and international documentaries, films, dramas and sporting events.

=== May ===
- 13 May –
  - RTÉ lifts its mandate requiring people to wear face masks on its campus.
  - RTÉ announces details of a Christmas musical for the first time, with Toy Show The Musical to premiere at the Convention Centre in Dublin from 10 to 31 December.
- 19 May – Casting opens for Toy Show The Musical, with girls aged between 11 and 16 being sought to play the lead role.
- 22 May – RTÉ and the National Lottery confirm Winning Streak will not return in Autumn 2022, and may not be back on television until late 2023. This is because of the COVID-19 restrictions in place earlier in the year and the time needed to produce the scratchcards associated with the game.
- 27 May – Derval O'Rourke announces she is leaving Ireland's Fittest Family after six non-consecutive seasons.
- 30 May – RTÉ One airs the final edition of Claire Byrne Live after the show was axed following seven years on air.
- 31 May – Jockey Nina Carberry will replace Derval O'Rourke as a coach on Ireland's Fittest Family.

=== July ===
- 12 July – The Government says it will maintain the current television licence but will overhaul the system to ensure it is more equitable, relevant and sustainable.

=== August ===
- 1–3 August – The final episodes of Australian soap Neighbours are shown on RTÉ2, RTÉ One and RTÉ Player.
- 24 August – Launch of Virgin Media Four.
- 25 August – Nicky Byrne steps down as co-presenter of Dancing with the Stars.

=== September ===
- 19 September – RTÉ provides live coverage of the state funeral of Queen Elizabeth II from London, both on television and online.

=== October ===
- 7 October – Doireann Garrihy is announced as Nicky Byrne's replacement on Dancing with the Stars, and will present alongside Jennifer Zamparelli.
- 24 October – Sky and the GAA announce a mutual agreement to end their broadcast partnership.

=== November ===
- 18 November – Eileen Dunne presents her final edition of RTÉ News: Nine O'Clock after 40 years with RTÉ and ahead of her retirement.
- 20 November – The Nugent family from County Louth, coached by Davy Fitzgerald, win season ten of Ireland's Fittest Family.
- 25 November – The Late Late Toy Show is broadcast on RTÉ One, and becomes the most watched programme on Irish television in 2022 with 1.6m viewers.
- 28 November – Pasquale La Rocca announces his departure from Dancing with the Stars to join the Italian version of the format, Ballando con le Stelle.

=== December ===
- 2 December – TG4 switches to HD on Saorview, becoming the third Irish TV channel to do so.
- 11 December – TG4 airs the 2022 Junior Eurovision Song Contest, where Ireland's Sophie Lennon finished in fourth place with her entry "Solas", achieving Ireland's best result to date in the contest.
- 14 December – Opening night of Toy Show The Musical at Dublin's Convention Centre, which will run till New Year's Eve.
- 17 December – Boxer Katie Taylor is voted the 2022 RTÉ Sports Person of the Year.
- 19 December – Toy Show The Musical is forced to cancel several performances due to illness among the show's cast and crew.
- 28 December – Tadhg Fleming and his family win the 2022 Christmas celebrity special of Ireland's Fittest Family along with €10,000 for their charity of choice.
- 31 December – RTÉ New Years Eve celebrations include Jennifer Zamparelli hosting a New Year’s Eve Party, from 10.15pm on RTÉ One which is followed by the NYE Countdown Concert with Westlife from the new festival village on North Wall Quay.

== Debuts ==
- 18 May – Conversations with Friends on RTÉ One
- 1 July – The Main Stage on RTÉ One
- 28 August – North Sea Connection on RTÉ One

== Ongoing television programmes ==
=== 1960s ===
- RTÉ News: Nine O'Clock (1961–present)
- RTÉ News: Six One (1962–present)
- The Late Late Show (1962–present)

=== 1970s ===
- The Late Late Toy Show (1975–present)
- The Sunday Game (1979–present)

=== 1980s ===
- Fair City (1989–present)
- RTÉ News: One O'Clock (1989–present)

=== 1990s ===
- Would You Believe (1990s–present)
- Winning Streak (1990–present)
- Prime Time (1992–present)
- Nuacht RTÉ (1995–present)
- Nuacht TG4 (1996–present)
- Reeling In the Years (1999–present)
- Ros na Rún (1996–present)
- TV3 News (1998–present)
- Ireland AM (1999–present)
- Telly Bingo (1999–present)

=== 2000s ===
- Nationwide (2000–present)
- TV3 News at 5.30 (2001–present) – now known as the 5.30
- Against the Head (2003–present)
- news2day (2003–present)
- Other Voices (2003–present)
- The Week in Politics (2006–present)
- At Your Service (2008–present)
- Operation Transformation (2008–present)
- 3e News (2009–present)
- Two Tube (2009–present)

=== 2010s ===
- Jack Taylor (2010–present)
- Mrs. Brown's Boys (2011–present)
- MasterChef Ireland (2011–present)
- Today (2012–present)
- The Works (2012–present)
- Second Captains Live (2013–present)
- Ireland's Fittest Family (2014–present)
- Claire Byrne Live (2015–2022)
- The Restaurant (2015–present)
- Red Rock (2015–present)
- TV3 News at 8 (2015–present)
- First Dates (2016–present)
- Dancing with the Stars (2017–2020, 2022–present)
- The Tommy Tiernan Show (2017–present)
- Striking Out (2017–present)

=== 2020s ===
- DIY SOS: The Big Build Ireland (2020–present)
- The Style Counsellors (2020–present)
- Smother (2021–present)

== Ending this year ==
- 30 May – Claire Byrne Live (2015–2022)
