= 2001 in Irish television =

The following is a list of events relating to television in Ireland from 2001.

== Events ==
=== January ===
- 1 January – The ITV soaps Coronation Street and Emmerdale move from RTÉ 1 to TV3 following Granada plc's purchase of a stake in the commercial broadcaster.
- 2 January – Long-running Australian soap opera Neighbours begins airing on television in Ireland for the very first time on RTÉ. Prior to airing on RTÉ, there was access to British television stations for viewers in Northern Ireland and several parts of Ireland to see earlier transmissions of the series, including the BBC, where it originally aired since its UK television debut on 27 October 1986.
- 5 January – Teachta Dála Michael Ring has asked broadcaster TV3 to consider erecting a transmitter near Belmullet, County Mayo, after being inundated with complaints from viewers unable to watch Coronation Street since its move to TV3.
- January - RTÉ celebrate 75 years of broadcasting.
- 15 January The ITV Children Programmes Sooty's Amazing Adventures is Going to air on Irish television with Network 2 screening it as part of Den2.

=== February ===
- 1 February – RTÉ Television begins airing the Beckett on Film series, a series of adaptations of the works of Samuel Beckett.

=== March ===
- March – RTÉ 1 begins airing BBC One soap EastEnders, the series having previously been shown on TV3.
- 14 March – New obligations of accountability for RTÉ are introduced under the Broadcasting Act.

=== May ===
- 6 May – Glenroe airs for the last time.

=== July ===
- 3 July – An increase in the licence fee to £84.50 is announced.

=== September ===
- 11 September – Coverage from the American cable news channel CNN is aired on TV3 News, as events from the United States are broadcast following the September 11 attacks. CNN has often aired on TV3 News since then, when major breaking news stories are taking place, particularly in the United States. Subsequent news footage simulcast from CNN include coverage of the 2008 election of Barack Obama as President of the United States and the 2009 death of Michael Jackson.

=== October ===
- October – RTÉ Television News introduces subtitles.

=== November ===
- 3 November – RTÉ signs up to the Sky Digital Platform.

=== Unknown ===
- Launch of threetext, TV3's teletext service.

== Debuts ==
=== RTÉ ===
- 5 January – God, the Devil and Bob on Network 2 (2000–2011)
- 7 January – Mike, Lu & Og on Network 2 (1999–2001)
- 9 January – Tweenies on Network 2 (1999–2002)
- 9 January – Ed, Edd n Eddy on Network 2 (1999–2009)
- 9 January – Moomin on Network 2 (1990–1991)
- 10 January – I am Weasel on Network 2 (1997–2000)
- 4 February – The Blizzard of Odd on Network 2 (2001–2005)
- 5 February – Thunderstone on Network 2 (1999–2000)
- 6 March – Gadget Boy & Heather on Network 2 (1995–1998)
- 26 March – Mumble Bumble on Network 2 (1999–2008)
- 28 March – Dinozaurs on Network 2 (2000)
- 29 March – The Kids from Room 402 on Network 2 (1999–2001)
- 29 March – Simsala Grimm on Network 2 (1999–2010)
- March/April- Eco Eye on RTÉ One (2001-2023)
- 5 April – Pig's Breakfast on Network 2 (1999–2000)
- 28 April – Redwall on Network 2 (1999–2002)
- 30 April – Jackie Chan Adventures on Network 2 (2000–2005)
- 11 May – Toad Patrol on Network 2 (1999–2001)
- 22 May – The Moonkys on Network 2 (2000)
- 23 May – Hi-5 on Network 2 (1999–2011, 2017)
- 23 May – Scruff on Network 2 (2000–2003)
- 4 June – Magic Mountain on Network 2 (1997–1998)
- 12 June – Courage the Cowardly Dog on Network 2 (1999–2002)
- 14 June – The Avengers: United They Stand on Network 2 (1999–2000)
- 21 June – The Zeta Project on Network 2 (2001–2002)
- 22 June – Power Rangers Lightspeed Rescue on Network 2 (2000)
- 2 July – Xyber 9: New Dawn on Network 2 (1999–2007)
- 20 July – Histeria! on Network 2 (1998–2000)
- 2 August – Static Shock on Network 2 (2000–2004)
- 8 August – Neighbours on Network 2 (1985–present)
- 1 September - Cardcaptor Sakura on Network 2 (1998-2000)
- 3 September – Braceface on Network 2 (2001–2004)
- 5 September – Wild Kat on Network 2 (2001)
- 7 September – Yoho Ahoy on Network 2 (2000–2001)
- 11 September – Peter Swift and the Little Circus on Network 2 (2000)
- 12 September – Angelina Ballerina on Network 2 (2001–2006)
- 18 September – Toonimals! on Network 2 (2001)
- 18 September – Pelswick on Network 2 (2000–2002)
- 1 October – Bachelors Walk on Network 2 (2001–2003)
- 1 October – The Cassidys on Network 2 (2001)
- 15 November – Popstars on RTÉ One (2001–2002)

=== TV3 ===
- 3 March – The Brothers Flub (1999–2000)
- 19 March – TV3 News at 5.30 (2001–present)
- 2 September – D'Myna Leagues (2000–2003)
- Undated – The Weakest Link (2001–2002)

=== TG4 ===
- 6 February – Clifford the Big Red Dog (2000–2003)
- 6 February – Poochini's Yard (2000–2003)
- 8 February – Pigs Next Door (2000)
- 8 February – Lapitch the Little Shoemaker (2000)
- 20 February – What About Mimi? (2000–2002)
- 28 May – Laochra Gael (2001–present)
- 29 May – Zirkos Kids (2000–2001)
- 30 May – Mimi and Mr. Bobo (1999–2001)
- 4 September – Nick & Perry (2000–2001)
- 6 September – The Cramp Twins (2001–2006)
- 31 October – The Hoobs (2001–2003)
- Undated – Ultimate Book of Spells (2001–2002)
- Undated – Generation O! (2000–2001)

== Changes of network affiliation ==
Shows	Moved from	Moved to
The Brothers Flub	TV3	TG4
EastEnders	TV3	RTÉ1
SuperTed	Network 2	TG4
Coronation Street	RTÉ1	TV3
Emmerdale	RTÉ1	TV3

== Ongoing television programmes ==
=== 1960s ===
- RTÉ News: Nine O'Clock (1961–present)
- RTÉ News: Six One (1962–present)
- The Late Late Show (1962–present)

=== 1970s ===
- The Late Late Toy Show (1975–present)
- RTÉ News on Two (1978–2014)
- The Sunday Game (1979–present)

=== 1980s ===
- Dempsey's Den (1986–2010)
- Questions and Answers (1986–2009)
- Fair City (1989–present)
- RTÉ News: One O'Clock (1989–present)

=== 1990s ===
- Would You Believe (1990s–present)
- Winning Streak (1990–present)
- Prime Time (1992–present)
- No Disco (1993–2003)
- Nuacht RTÉ (1995–present)
- Fame and Fortune (1996–2006)
- Nuacht TG4 (1996–present)
- Ros na Rún (1996–present)
- A Scare at Bedtime (1997–2006)
- The Premiership/Premier Soccer Saturday (1998–2013)
- Sports Tonight (1998–2009)
- TV3 News (1998–present)
- Open House (1999–2004)
- Agenda (1999–2004)
- The View (1999–2011)
- Ireland AM (1999–present)
- Telly Bingo (1999–present)

=== 2000s ===
- Who Wants to Be a Millionaire? (2000–2002)
- Nationwide (2000–present)

== Ending this year ==
- 18 March – First Edition (1999–2001)
- 26 March – Don't Feed the Gondolas (1997–2001)
- 6 May – Glenroe (1983–2001)
- September – The Movie Show (1993–2001)
- 25 December – Bull Island (1999–2001)
- Undated – Challenging Times (1991–2001)

== See also ==
- 2001 in Ireland
