= Don't Look Back in Anger (disambiguation) =

"Don't Look Back in Anger" is a song by Oasis.

Other meanings of this phrase include:

- Don't Look Back in Anger (TV series), an Irish TV series
- "Don't Look Back in Anger", a short film appearing in a 1978 episode of Saturday Night Live

== See also ==
- Look Back in Anger, a 1956 play
- Don't Look Back in Ongar, a novel by Ross O'Carroll Kelly (Paul Howard)
- Oasis: Don't Look Back in Anger, a documentary film covering the reunion of Oasis and their Live '25 Tour
