= Midweek (Irish TV series) =

Irish television news magazine

- Genre: News and Current Affairs
- Created by: TV3 News
- Presented by: Colette Fitzpatrick (2009-2013); Sarah Carey (2010-2011)
- Country of origin: Ireland
- Original language: English
- No. of seasons: 5

Production
- Producer: Patrick Kinsella
- Production locations: TV3, Westgate Business Park, Dublin 24, Ireland
- Camera setup: Multi-camera
- Running time: 60 minutes

Original release
- Network: TV3
- Release: 9 September 2009 – 28 May 2014

Related
- Midday; Tonight with Vincent Browne

Midweek is an Irish weekly television news magazine broadcast by TV3. Produced by TV3 News, the programme focused more on human interest stories than international and political subjects. It aired Wednesday at 22:00.

== History ==
Midweek was broadcast for the first time on 9 September 2009. It was introduced at a time when TV3 was expanding its home-produced programmes. The show was scheduled for Wednesday nights to avoid a clash with Prime Time which is broadcast at a similar time on RTÉ One on Tuesday and Thursday nights.

In contrast to the Prime Time programme, Midweek focused on more human interest stories rather than hard current affairs stories. It featured studio debate, reports, pre-recorded video links and interviews. The first series of Midweek was broadcast on Wednesday nights at 21:00. All subsequent series have been broadcast on Wednesday nights at 22:00 The programme is followed by a news summary and Tonight with Vincent Browne.

In July 2014 it was announced that Midweek would not be returning instead it is to be replaced by a special documentaries unit at TV3.

== Presenters ==
Colette Fitzpatrick, TV3's lead female news presenter, has presented Midweek since the programme started in 2009. At the time she also presented the daily chat show Midday and co-presented the TV3 News at 5.30. In 2010 Sarah Carey took over as presenter of Midweek while Fitzpatrick was on maternity leave.

== Controversies ==
=== Cross-border shopping ===
During a piece investigating cross-border shopping for groceries in 2011, there was controversy when Ciara Doherty offended viewers from Northern Ireland by implying that everyone in Northern Ireland identified themselves as British. Midweek was also accused of portraying Northerners as if they were from Germany or Outer Mongolia.
