= History Rocks =

- Genre: Educational, Non-Fiction
- No. of seasons: 1
- No. of episodes: 3

Production
- Executive producer: Bruce David Klein
- Producer: Atlas Media Corporation
- Running time: 60 minutes

Original release
- Network: History Channel
- Release: December 17, 2007

History Rocks is a non-fiction educational television series shown on the History Channel. Each episode explains eight historical events, arranged by decade, through multimedia presentations consisting of photographs, archival footage, popular music and pop-up trivia. Six episodes were produced, with two focusing on 1960s, 1970s and 1980s. At one time, the History Channel website discussed a fourth special on the topic of Sex, but the official History Rocks' website at the History Channel no longer mentions it.

Although the show was originally hosted by Meat Loaf, subsequent airings of the videos edited Meat Loaf out and removed his segues between videos.

== List of Segments ==
=== 1960s ===
- Violence Batters 1968 Democratic Convention / "My Generation" by The Who
- The Draft Lottery / "Get Together" by The Youngbloods
- First of the Muscle Cars: Pontiac GTO / "Born to Be Wild" by Steppenwolf
- Marilyn Monroe's Mysterious Death / "Nights in White Satin" by The Moody Blues
- Smoking is Hazardous / "Ring of Fire"
- The Pill Begins Sexual Revolution / "Time of the Season" by The Zombies
- G.I. Joe / "Bend Me, Shape Me" by The Outsiders
- Summer of Love / "Sunshine of Your Love" by Cream
- Cassius Clay changes his name / "Thank You (Falettinme Be Mice Elf Agin)" by Sly and the Family Stone
- Castro Must Die! / "Feelin' Alright" by Joe Cocker
- Growing up in the 1960s / "Sunshine Superman" by Donovan
- The JFK Conspiracy / "I Can See for Miles" by The Who
- LSD and Timothy Leary / "White Room" by Cream
- Race for Space / "Magic Carpet Ride" by Steppenwolf
- Vietnam Soldier / "A Whiter Shade of Pale" by Procol Harum
- Volkswagen in the 1960s / "Venus" by The Shocking Blue

=== 1970s ===
- Munich massacre / "Hold Your Head Up" by Argent
- The Beginning of Video Games / "You Ain't Seen Nothing Yet" by Bachman-Turner Overdrive
- Fall of Saigon / "Free Bird" by Lynyrd Skynyrd
- CB Radio / "Jessica" by The Allman Brothers Band
- Jonestown / "(Don't Fear) The Reaper" by Blue Öyster Cult
- Disappearance of Jimmy Hoffa / "Takin' Care of Business" by Bachman-Turner Overdrive
- History of the Concorde / "Come Sail Away" by Styx
- Saturday Night Massacre / "Saturday Night's Alright for Fighting" by Elton John
- History of the Muscle Car / "Cars" by Gary Numan
- Elvis meets Richard Nixon / "Why Can't We Be Friends?" by War
- Iranian Revolution / "The Logical Song" by Supertramp
- Three Mile Island accident / "Message in a Bottle" by The Police

=== 1980s ===
- Perestroika
- America's War On Drugs (The crack epidemic) / "Electric Avenue" by Eddy Grant
- Going Mobile / "Call Me" by Blondie
- Pac-Man Fever / "Everybody Have Fun Tonight" by Wang Chung
- Black Monday / "Urgent" by Foreigner
- Mount St. Helens eruption / "Should I Stay or Should I Go" by The Clash
- Supercars / "Obsession" by Animotion
- The Berlin Wall / "We're Not Gonna Take It" by Twisted Sister
- Reagan Meets Gorbachev / "Cult of Personality" by Living Colour

== Future airings ==
Although the History Channel frequently aired the series during the summer of 2007, the official website states that there are no plan to air the episodes in the immediate future. Most of the videos are available, however, for on-demand online viewing. The full set of segments from the 1960s are currently available. The shop at the History Channel's website has a section devoted to History Rocks, but the videos available for purchase are only related to the individual segments and do not contain the actual videos aired on television.

== Similarities to other shows ==
History Rocks shares many similarities with the BBC television show The Rock 'n' Roll Years aired between 1985 and 1994. The format of the programme, which was based on the BBC Radio 1 series 25 Years of Rock, was primarily of news clips with narrative subtitles set to music of the time with no presenters or voice-overs.

History Rocks is also close in format to the VH1's program Pop-up Video. Although Rocks frequently discusses more serious topics than does Video, both programs have videos with identical form and structure; both videos use "info nuggets" and popular music as their central premise. Video predates Rocks by several years. Rocks has occasionally been criticized for its similarity to Video, but many of its fans support Rocks's appeal to a wider audience than other documentary shows.

== Awards ==
In 2007, History Rocks was awarded "Best short form audiovisual entertainment made for mobile and/or Internet lifestyle/music" at Mipcom's Mobile and Internet TV Awards
