= TV3 News @ 7 =

- Created by: 3 News Ireland
- Presented by: Colette Fitzpatrick; Caroline Twohig
- Theme music composer: DeWolfe Music
- Country of origin: Ireland
- Original language: English

Production
- Production locations: TV3, Westgate Business Park, Dublin 24, Ireland
- Camera setup: Multi-camera
- Running time: 15-30 minutes (incl. Ad Breaks)

Original release
- Network: TV3

Related
- TV3 News @ 6; First Edition

TV3 News @ 7 is the second early evening news programme on the Irish television network TV3. It was produced by the TV3 News division.

The TV3 News @ 7, presented by main newscasters Alan Cantwell and Colette Fitzpatrick, was a thirty-minute news programme covering Irish national and international news stories, broadcast at 7:00pm from Monday to Friday.

== History ==
When TV3 launched on 20 September 1998 its early evening news programme was called TV3 News @ 6. It provided a comprehensive view of the day's main international and national news stories, was presented by Alan Cantwell and Gráinne Seoige and was in direct competition with RTÉ News: Six One. This period of direct rivalry with RTÉ only lasted for a year as TV3 decided to break up the hour-long programme. As a result of this two new programmes - First Edition at 5:30pm and TV3 News @ 7 - were launched. Both programmes were still fronted by Cantwell and Seoige, while First Edition became Ireland's first early evening news programme.

In January 2001 the TV3 News @ 7 was dropped and the TV3 News at 6.30 was launched with Cantwell and Seoige still remaining at the helm.

== Newscasters ==
=== Main newscaster ===
Years	Newscaster	Other roles	Previous roles
1999–2000	Alan Cantwell		
1999–2000	Gráinne Seoige		
