= Trevor Dann =

British writer and broadcaster

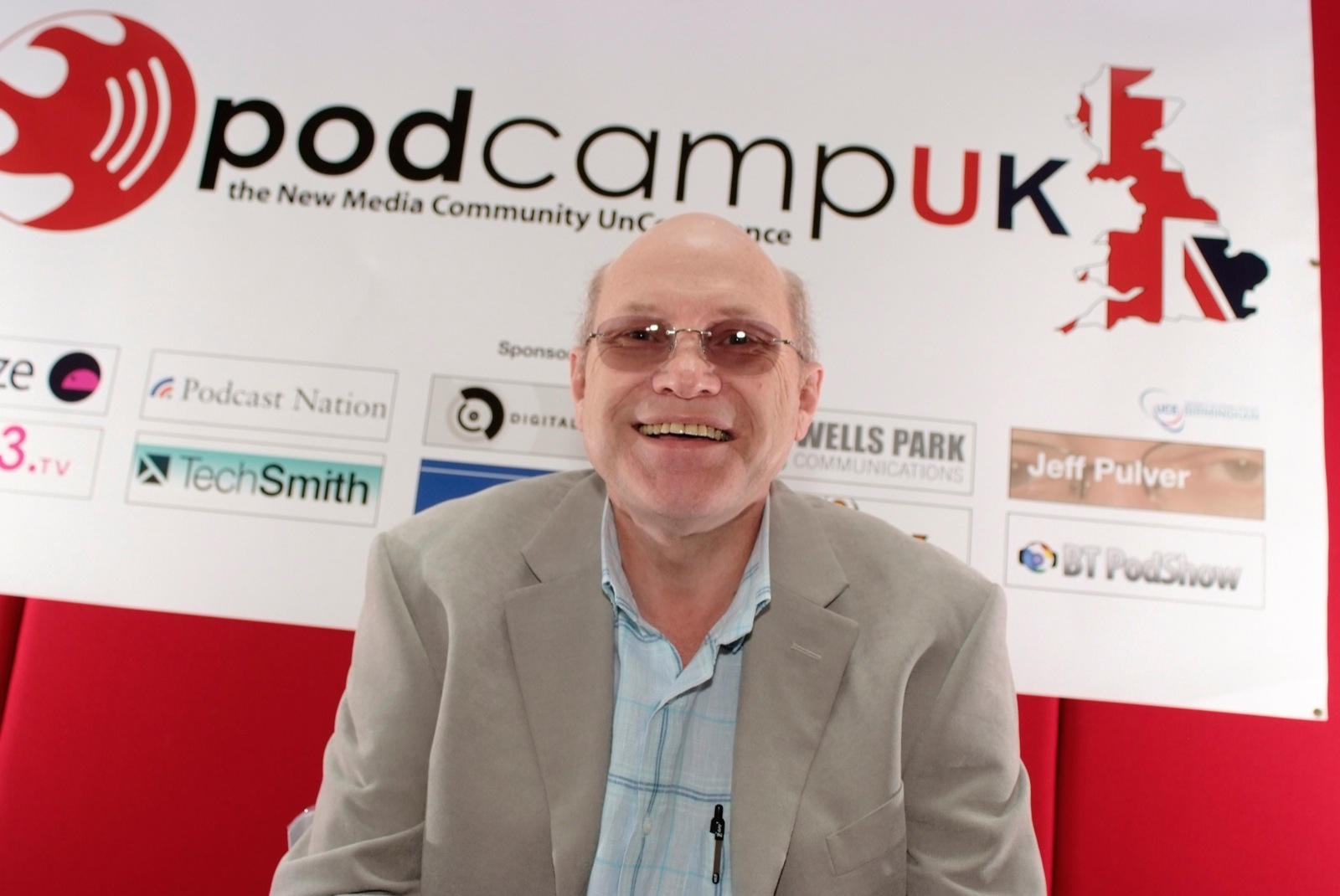
- Trevor Dann at Pod Camp UK in 2007
- Born: 6 November 1951 (age 74)
- Education: Fitzwilliam College, Cambridge
- Occupations: Writer, broadcaster and radio executive

Trevor John Dann (born 6 November 1951) is an English writer and broadcaster best known for his radio and print journalism with BBC Radio, Q magazine, Mojo, and The Guardian, and his critically praised 2006 "Darker Than the Deepest Sea" biography of Nick Drake.

== Early career ==
Dann was educated at Nottingham High School and Fitzwilliam College, Cambridge. Dann's radio career began at BBC Radio Nottingham in 1974. He was a producer at BBC Radio 1 from 1979 to 1983, working principally with Noel Edmonds, Tommy Vance, Dave Lee Travis and John Peel as well as developing the 25 Years of Rock series, which later transferred to TV as The Rock 'n' Roll Years.

In the 1980s he was a producer on BBC2’s Old Grey Whistle Test for four years and presented his own weekly show for BBC Radio Cambridgeshire. In 1988 he was the founding programme director of GLR, the station which launched the radio careers of Chris Morris and Danny Baker among others.

== Recent career ==
After a spell as an independent producer with his own company, Confederate Broadcasting, Dann became Head of Radio 1 Production with responsibility for the revamping the network’s music policy in 1995. The Daily Star dubbed him 'Dann Dann the Hatchetman'. He became involved in a dispute with Status Quo after banning their music from the station in a bid to improve its "youth" credentials. In 1996 he was appointed Head Of BBC Music Entertainment running all the BBC's pop music production including Radio 1, Radio 2, Top of the Pops, Later and Glastonbury.

He left the BBC in 2000 to join EMAP as MD of Pop where he launched the Smash Hits Radio Show and the Smash Hits TV channel and was executive producer of the Smash Hits Poll Winners Party for Channel 4. Between 2002 and 2004 he presented BBC Radio Cambridgeshire's breakfast show. He presented a weekly radio show called 'It's Amazing' on national DAB station Amazing Radio in 2010.

Dann was appointed director of the UK Radio Academy in September 2006. His first book, Darker Than The Deepest Sea, a biography of Nick Drake, was published in February 2006. He has written for The Times, The Guardian, 'Q magazine, Mojo and The Evening Standard. He runs the Trevor Dann Production Company which produces a number of radio programmes for UK and Irish radio, and he presents a weekly podcast about the radio industry for Radio Today. He is a director of community radio station Cambridge 105.

== Awards ==
He won a BAFTA for his production work on Live Aid, and has several Sony Radio Awards for production and presentation. He is a Fellow of both the Royal Society of Arts and The Radio Academy.
