= Allie Sherlock =

Irish singer, guitarist, songwriter, and busker (born 2005)

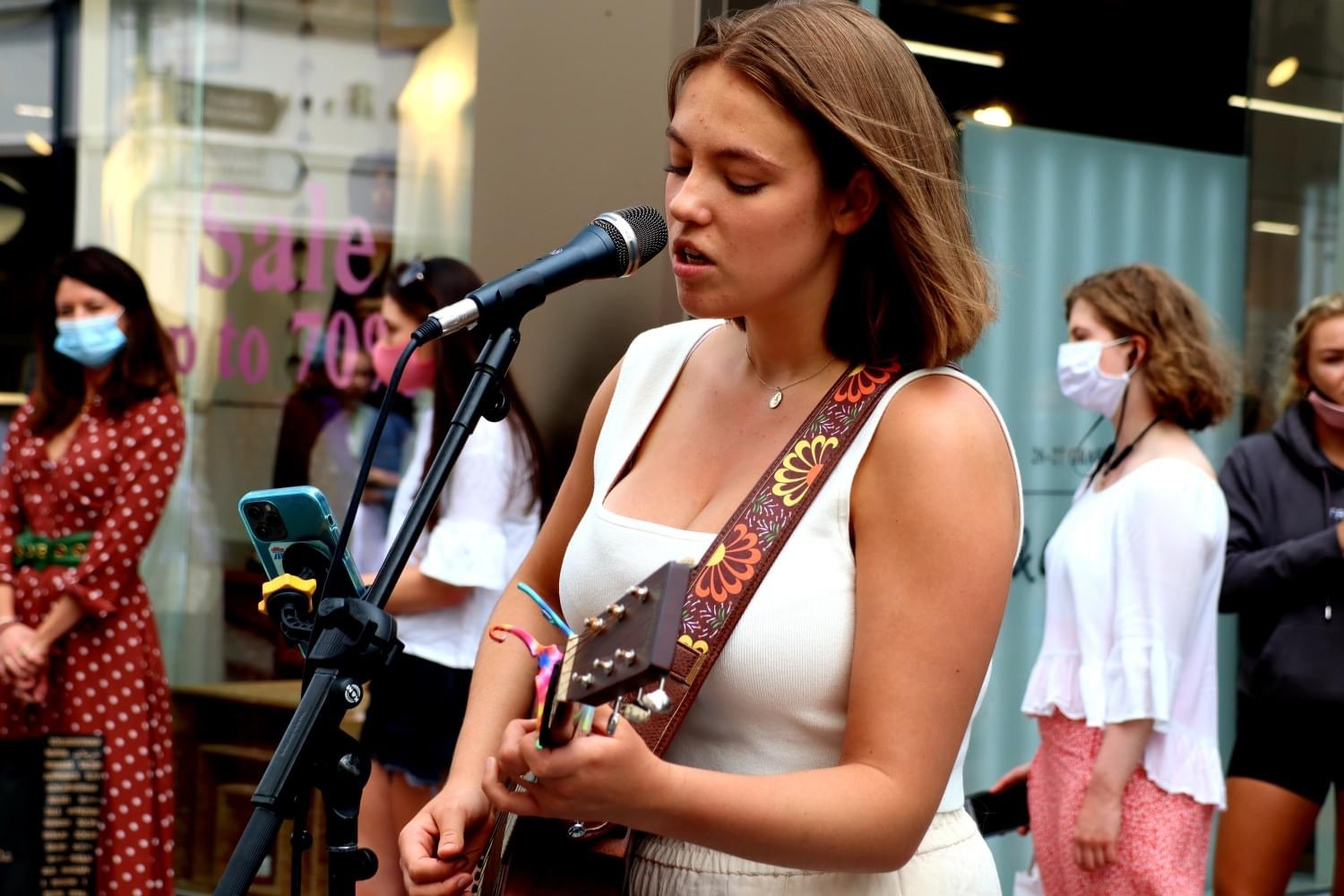
- Sherlock performing on Grafton Street in 2021

Background information
- Born: 7 April 2005 (age 21); Douglas, Cork, Ireland
- Genre: Pop
- Occupations: Singer; guitarist; songwriter; busker
- Instruments: Vocals; Guitar; Ukulele; Piano
- Years active: 2016–present
- Label: Patriot Records
- Website: alliesherlock.com

YouTube information
- Channel: Allie Sherlock
- Years active: 2014–present
- Genre: Music
- Subscribers: 6.28 million
- Views: 1.46 billion
- Last updated: 4 May 2025

Allie Sherlock (born 7 April 2005) is an Irish singer, guitarist, songwriter, and busker. A video of her performing a cover of Ed Sheeran's "Supermarket Flowers" went viral on YouTube in June 2017. Sherlock has performed frequently on Grafton Street in Dublin, Ireland.

== Early and personal life ==
Sherlock is from Douglas in Cork, Ireland, and was born on 7 April 2005. She left primary school in 2016 due to bullying and changed to homeschooling. "It wasn't physical, it was more the way they treated me. It was done in a sneakier, slyer way. I would come home really stressed and I would be literally perspiring from the stress," she said.

Her mother died when Sherlock was 9 years old.

Sherlock began busking in Cork and later, from the age of 11, began performing almost weekly on Grafton Street, Dublin. Her father, who is her music manager, is also present and remains "on guard when people are inappropriate". He films and uploads her YouTube videos.

== Career ==
In 2014, Sherlock's YouTube channel was created. As of January 2026, the channel had over 6.32 million subscribers and generated over 1.52 billion views. She later started a Patreon channel, and (as of May 2025) has over 3.1 million Instagram followers and approximately 4 million followers on Facebook.

In August 2017, she performed at the 2017 Miss Universe Ireland pageant.

In early 2018, she performed the song "Million Years Ago" by Adele on ABC's The Ellen DeGeneres Show, and she played "Perfect" by Ed Sheeran on RTÉ One's The Ray D'Arcy Show. Later in 2018, Sherlock signed a five-year contract with Patriot Records, owned by OneRepublic lead vocalist, Ryan Tedder.

Live concerts by Sherlock in Ireland have included performances at the Cork Opera House (December 2016), Cyprus Avenue in Cork (December 2018), and at the Olympia Theatre, Dublin, in April 2019. She performed at the Elbphilharmonie Concert Hall in Hamburg, Germany in early 2020. During their European tour in March 2020, Sherlock supported OneRepublic at concerts in Paris (France), Cologne (Germany), Utrecht (Netherlands), and the London Palladium (UK).

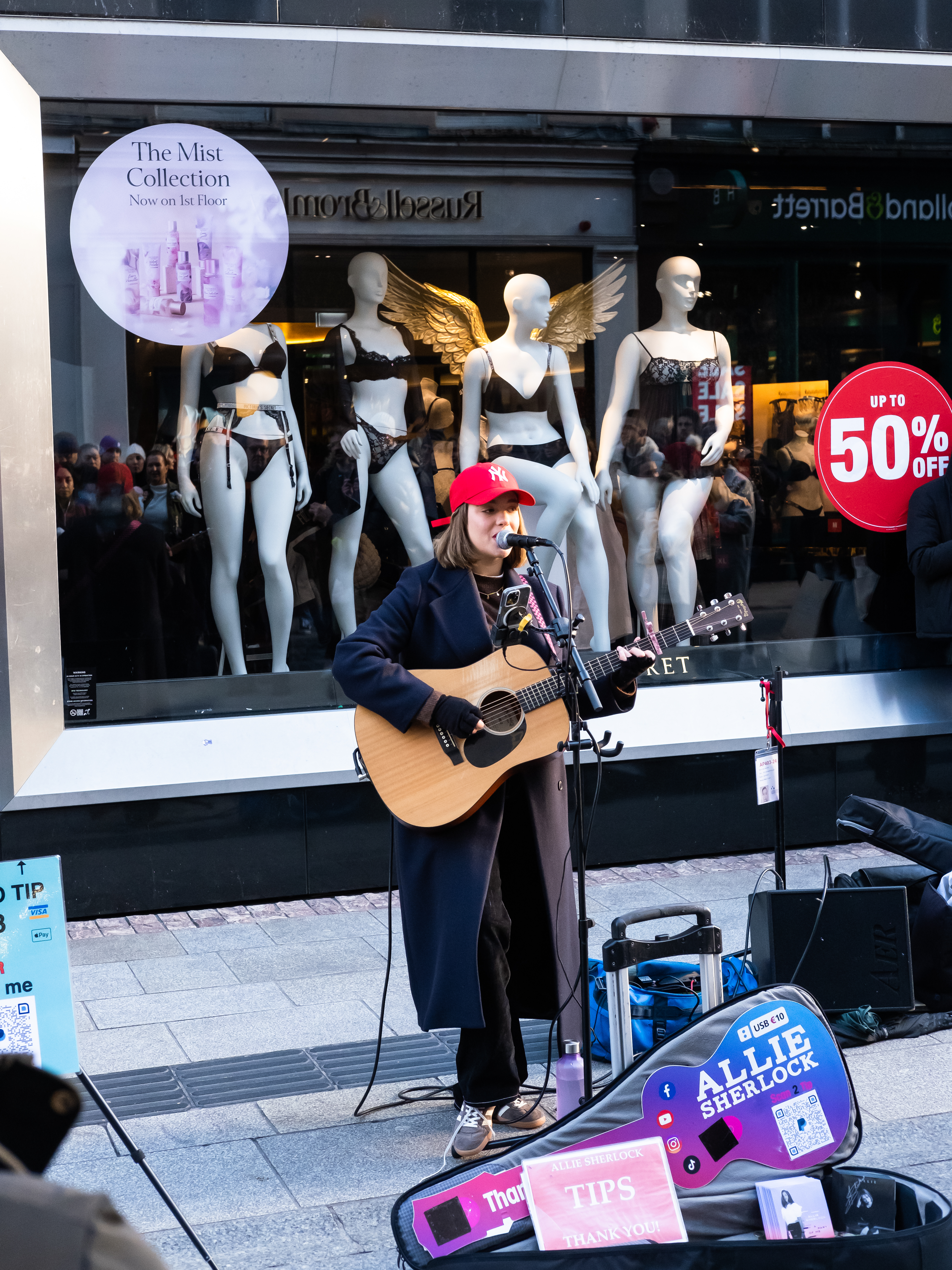
Sherlock performing on Grafton Street in 2025

In February 2020, she released a first extended play (EP) of a cover of "At Last" by Etta James. In June 2020, she performed with the RTÉ Concert Orchestra as part of the final episode of RTÉ's Home School Hub. Also in 2020, Sherlock was part of a collective of female artists called "Irish Women in Harmony", that recorded a version of Dreams in aid of a domestic abuse charity.

In December 2021, Sherlock performed on Virgin Media Television on Dave Fanning's Fanning at Whelan's show.

As of 2022, she was in studio writing songs alongside Kodaline guitarist Steve Garrigan.

On 4 June 2022, Sherlock performed at the AO Arena in Manchester (shown on ITV) for the Platinum Jubilee of Elizabeth II celebrations.

On 7 April 2023, Sherlock celebrated her 18th birthday and released the album Allie, including 11 cover songs.

== Songwriting ==
In addition to covering songs on YouTube, Sherlock also writes original songs. Some of her original songs are "Hero", "Locked Inside", "Without You" (released July 2021), and "Leave Me With a Decent Goodbye" (September 2021). The theme of "Hero" is self-confidence and "Locked Inside" is about how she felt during the COVID-19 quarantine period. The song "The Night Before" is about her mother's death. The single "How Love Works", reportedly composed with input from Ella Henderson and Ollie Green, was released in 2024.

== Discography ==
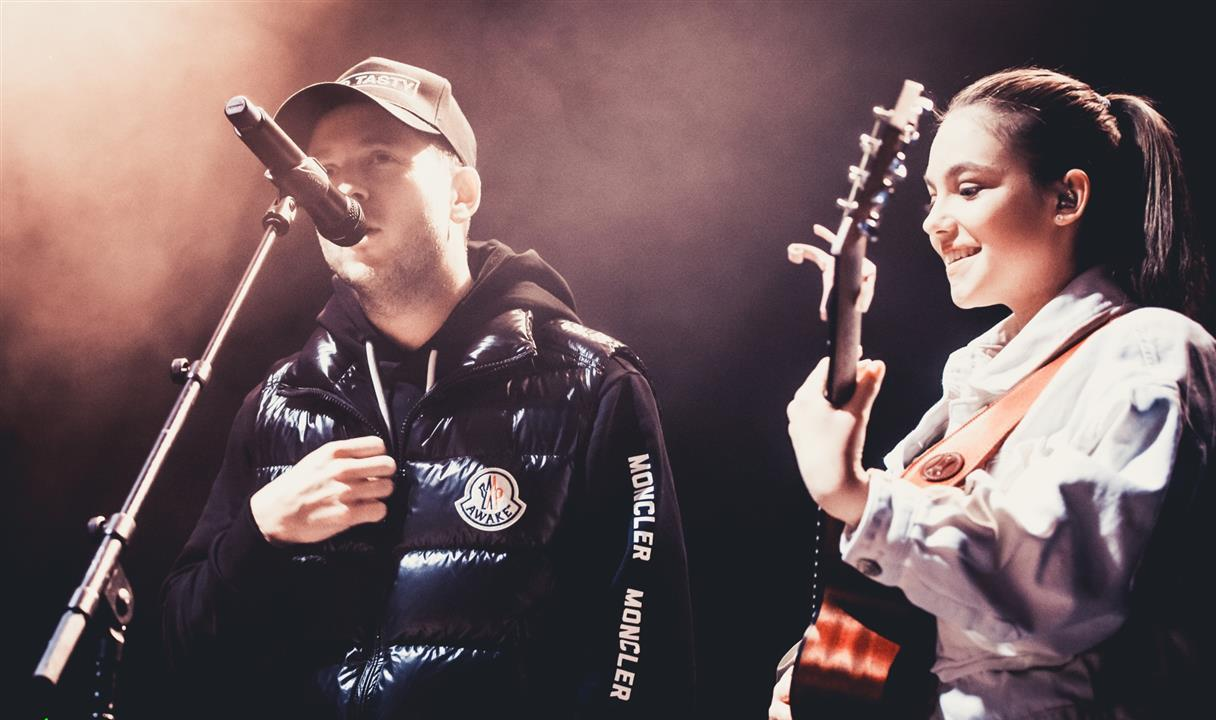
Ryan Tedder and Allie Sherlock in concert at Cologne, Germany (March 2020)

Albums

- Allie (11 tracks, released April 2023)

Singles

- "Stay" (2023)
- "Nobody Gets Me" (2023)
- "How Love Works" (released October 2024)
- "Stargazing" (2024)
- "Ex Friend" (2025)
- "The Greatest" (2025)
- "I Don't Need Saving" (2025)
