= Elaine Crowley (presenter) =

Irish TV journalist and presenter (born 1977)

- Born: 18 August 1977 (age 48); Newtwopothouse, Mallow, County Cork, Ireland
- Education: Dublin Institute of Technology
- Occupations: Journalist, presenter, newsreader
- Years active: 2000–present
- Notable credit(s): Ireland AM; TV3 News; Midday; Elaine

Elaine Crowley (born 18 August 1977) is an Irish journalist, presenter and newsreader, best known for presenting Midday from 2010 to 2016 and Elaine from 2016 to 2021. Since September 2021 she has been a co-host on Ireland AM alongside Martin King and Eric Roberts.

== Career ==
Crowley studied at Dublin Institute of Technology before joining TV3 in 2000. She was a newsreader and a presenter on morning talk show Ireland AM before headlining panel show Midday from 2010 to 2016.

== Personal life ==
Crowley is the youngest of ten. She is in a long term relationship. Crowley has been open about her struggles with her weight and body image, and with clinical depression. In 2016, she took part in Celebrity Operation Transformation on RTÉ One.

In 2025 she took part in the eighth season of Dancing with the Stars on RTÉ One with her partner Denys Samson.
