= Don't Look Back in Ongar =

2024 book by Paul Howard

- Author: Paul Howard
- Illustrator: Alan Clarke
- Cover artist: Alan Clarke
- Language: English
- Series: Ross O'Carroll-Kelly
- Genre: Comic novel, satire
- Set in: Dublin, 2019-20
- Published: 22 August 2024, Penguin
- Publication place: Republic of Ireland
- Media type: Print: paperback
- Pages: 320
- ISBN: 9781844886296
- Dewey Decimal: 823.92
- Preceded by: Camino Royale

Don't Look Back in Ongar is a 2024 comic novel by Irish playwright and author Paul Howard and is the twenty-fourth and last novel in the Ross O'Carroll-Kelly series.

The title refers to the song "Don't Look Back in Anger" (and possibly the nostalgic Virgin Media TV series) and the Dublin suburb of Ongar.

== Release ==
The novel was released on 22 August 2024.

== Plot ==
Ross is turning forty, and his wife Sorcha still wants a divorce, and his father is causing trouble in Áras an Uachtaráin, while his son Ronan is working for villainous lawyer Hennessy. His mother Fionnuala, who has Alzheimer's, is placed in a luxury nursing home in Ongar.

== Reviews ==
The Irish Times described the finale as "unexpectedly touching."
