= First Edition (Irish TV programme) =

- Created by: TV3 News
- Presented by: Alan Cantwell; Gráinne Seoige
- Country of origin: Ireland
- Original language: English

Production
- Production locations: TV3, Westgate Business Park, Dublin 24, Ireland
- Camera setup: Multi-camera
- Running time: 30 minutes

Original release
- Network: TV3
- Release: 12 April 1999 – 18 March 2001

Related
- 3News at 5.30; TV3 News @ 6 TV3 News @ 7

First Edition was the early evening news programme on the Irish television network TV3. It was produced by the TV3 News division.

First Edition, presented by main newscasters Alan Cantwell and Colette Fitzpatrick, was a thirty-minute news programme covering Irish national and international news stories, broadcast at 5:30pm from Monday to Sunday.

== History ==
When TV3 launched on 20 September 1998 its early evening news programme was called TV3 News @ 6. It provided a comprehensive view of the day's main international and national news stories, was presented by Alan Cantwell and Gráinne Seoige and was in direct competition with RTÉ News: Six One. This period of direct rivalry with RTÉ only lasted for a year as TV3 decided to break up the hour-long programme. As a result of this two new programmes – First Edition at 5:30pm and TV3 News @ 7 – were launched. Both programmes were still fronted by Cantwell and Seoige, while First Edition became Ireland's first early evening news programme.

On 19 March 2001 First Edition was relaunched as TV3 News at 5.30 with Cantwell and Seoige still remaining at the helm.

== Newscasters ==
=== Main newscaster ===
Years	Newscaster	Other roles	Previous roles
1998–1999	Alan Cantwell		
1998–1999	Gráinne Seoige		
