= Don't Look Back in Anger (TV series) =

- Title card
- Genre: Documentary
- Country of origin: Republic of Ireland
- Original language: English
- No. of seasons: 6
- No. of episodes: 23

Production
- Running time: 23–24 minutes

Original release
- Network: Virgin Media One
- Release: September 20, 2018 – present

Don't Look Back in Anger is an Irish documentary television programme, first broadcast in 2018. Each episode covers a particular year in Irish history, using archive material (mostly from TV3 and Virgin Media Ireland), on-screen text in English and contemporary music to tell the story of a particular year. It is similar in format to RTÉ's Reeling in the Years or TG4's Siar Sna....

== See also ==
- The Rock 'n' Roll Years (BBC)
- Reeling In the Years (RTÉ)
- Siar Sna (TG4)
