= Midday (Irish talk show) =

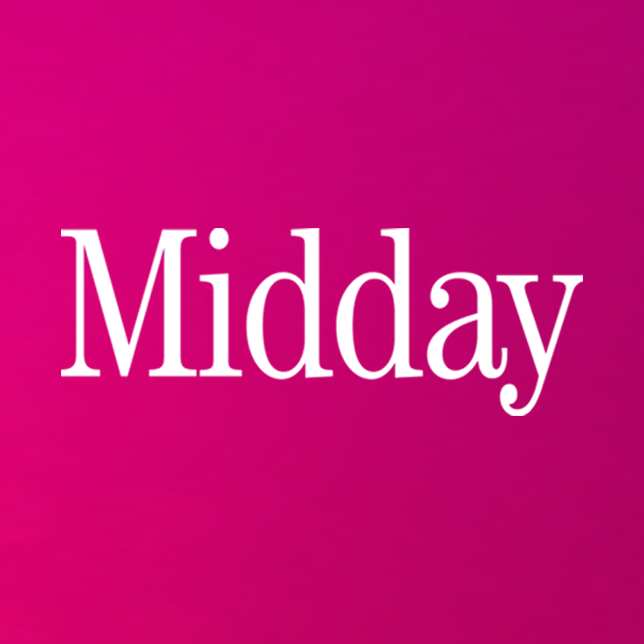
- Genre: Current affairs
- Directed by: Tony Bohan
- Presented by: Sybil Mulcahy (2013–2015); Elaine Crowley (2010–2016); Colette Fitzpatrick (2008–2011); Alan Cantwell (2008–2009); Martin King (2008–2009); Mary Byrne (2013-2016); Rachel Kavanagh; Fiona Looney; Mary McEvoy; Julie Cobbe
- Country of origin: Ireland
- Original language: English

Production
- Producer: Stuart Smith
- Production locations: TV3, Westgate Business Park, Dublin 24, Ireland
- Camera setup: Multi-camera
- Running time: 60 minutes
- Production company: TV3 Group

Original release
- Network: TV3
- Release: 1 October 2008 – 23 December 2016

Related
- Xposé; Elaine; Ireland AM; Late Lunch Live; TV3 News; Loose Women; Midweek

Midday is an Irish television talk show programme skewed towards female viewers. The show ran from 2008 to 2016. It was replaced by Elaine Crowley in 2017.

== Development ==
Midday first aired on TV3 on 1 October 2008. Today, the show is skewed towards a female audience where a panellists and the main anchor tackle the hot topics and trends of the day with live feedback from viewers. The first season run of the show was hosted by Colette Fitzpatrick, Martin King and Alan Cantwell who were joined by different panellist each show. By 2009 it was decided due to its popularity with female audiences it was later decided to replace the two male anchors with an all female panellist.

In 2010, Colette Fitzpatrick decided to focus on her work at TV3 News where Elaine Crowley took over as the main presenter, and four other women who make up the panelist. This panel of women varies from each episode generally made-up of some of Ireland's best known businesswomen, actresses, artists, sportswomen and female political figures.

In September 2013 Midday receives a slight revamp, where Elaine Crowley was joined by new co-presenter, former The Morning Show presenter, Sybil Mulcahy. As of July 2015 Sybil no longer contributes to the show.

The show was canceled in 2016 as TV3 wished to revamp their schedule for 2017. The show was replaced by Elaine, again presented by Elaine Crowley from January 2017. The show follows the same format but airs slightly later.

== Production ==
The show is broadcast every weekday all year round, with a short break during the December holiday period. The show is heavily aimed at women, and the topics and panelist discussions revolve around relevant topics, to their target demographic. Viewers can interact with the show via telephone, email and social networks, their views and comments on panel discussions are included frequently.

== Presenters ==
When Midday was launched in 2008, it was presented by Alan Cantwell, Colette Fitzpatrick and Martin King and featured two guest panellists. But in 2009, TV3 decided to make the week commencing Monday 8 June, a "girls only" week on Midday with the team discussing day to day issues of family life. After the "girls only" week was such a huge success, TV3 decided to go with a change in format and drop Alan Cantwell and Martin King from the show, and have Colette Fitzpatrick as the primary face of the show and feature a panel of females on the show every day.

In 2010, Elaine Crowley joined Midday as a presenter, her and Colette presented the show separately. In 2011, Elaine Crowley became the full-time host after Colette decided to leave the show to focus on her job at TV3 News. In 2013, singer Mary Byrne presented with Elaine on rotation.

== Studio ==
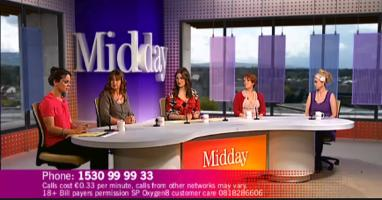
The Midday studio, (l-r) Rachel Kavanagh, Fiona Looney, Elaine Crowley, Mary McEvoy & Julie Cobbe

The Midday studio utilises a chroma key studio set up, with a back drop of Dublin keyed in and. A selection of 4 panelists and the presenter sit around a central desk, with the presenter in the middle. The studio's desk has the shows logo facing outwards in the middle, while behind the desk purple hued panels are placed in front of the Dublin background shot. The show's name is displayed behind the presenter on a purple background too. The show is filmed in TV3's Ballymount studios. The studio uses a multi camera set up. The show also switches to the TV3 News Studio for updates throughout the programme

It was expected that Midday would receive a new set, and move into TV3's newly built €5 million Sony HD Studios as new director of programming, Jeff Ford, said he planned on filming the morning time programmes in the Sony Studios to give independent production companies and international production companies the opportunity to use its facilities during the daytime. It was expected the Midday set would receive a revamp after TV3's 2013 Autumn/Winter schedule is brought into process, it is said the schedule will be a major shake-up for TV3.

In early 2016, Midday moved to the Virgin Media TV3 HD Studio, next door to TV3's Ballymount Studios. Along with the move, the show also received new graphics.
