= Virgin Media News at 5.30 =

Irish television news programme

- Presented by: Colette Fitzpatrick
- Country of origin: Ireland
- Original language: English

Production
- Production locations: Dublin, Ireland
- Camera setup: Multi-camera
- Running time: 25 minutes
- Production company: Virgin Media Television

Original release
- Network: Virgin Media One
- Release: 19 March 2001 – present

Related
- Virgin Media News; Virgin Media News at 8.00

Virgin Media News at 5.30 is the flagship evening news programme on the Irish television network Virgin Media One (formerly known as "TV3"). It is produced by the Virgin Media News division. Presented by main news anchor Colette Fitzpatrick, the thirty-minute news programme covers Irish national and international news stories daily.

== History ==
When TV3 launched on 20 September 1998, its early evening news programme was called TV3 News @ 6. It provided a comprehensive view of the day's main international and national news stories, was presented by Alan Cantwell and Gráinne Seoige and was in direct competition with RTÉ News: Six One. This period of direct rivalry with RTÉ only lasted for a year as TV3 decided to break up the hour-long programme. As a result of this, two new programmes - First Edition at 5:30 pm and TV3 News @ 7 - were launched. Both programmes were still fronted by Cantwell and Seoige, while First Edition became Ireland's first early-evening news programme.

On 19 March 2001, First Edition was relaunched as TV3 News at 5.30 with Cantwell and Seoige still remaining at the helm. It was also around this time that TV3's second early evening news programme moved from 7:00 pm to 6:30 pm, becoming the TV3 News @ 6.30.

In 2004, Gráinne Seoige left TV3 News to become the new face of Sky News Ireland. She was replaced as the main female presenter of TV3 News at 5.30 by Claire Byrne, who had been working with TV3 for a number of years at that stage.

Two years later in 2006, Byrne left TV3 to front the new breakfast show on Newstalk. Her departure was not a happy one as a lengthy legal battle was played out. Colette Fitzpatrick took over from Byrne.

In 2007, TV3 dropped their 6.30 news bulletin, leaving TV3 News at 5.30 as their only flagship evening news bulletin.

In 2010, Elaine Crowley became the latest co-presenter of TV3 News at 5.30 to join Alan Cantwell. She replaced Colette Fitzpatrick, who was on maternity leave. Fitzpatrick returned in 2011.

The last newscast as TV3 News at 5.30 was broadcast on 19 October 2012. It was replaced with The 5.30.

In 2017, the show was renamed 3News at 5.30 during the revamp of the TV3 Group.

A major rebrand of the entire TV3 Group took place in August 2018, when the company was renamed as Virgin Media Television, with all news output rebranded as Virgin Media News.

== Newscasters ==
=== Main newscasters ===
- Colette Fitzpatrick
- Caroline Twohig
- Geraldine Lynagh
- Anne O'Donnell.

=== Relief newscasters ===
Years	Newscaster	Other Roles
2010-2011	Elaine Crowley	Presenter of Elaine
2011-2012	Brian Daly	News correspondent

=== Former presenters ===
Presenter	Years
Gráinne Seoige	2001-2004
Claire Byrne	2004-2006
Alan Cantwell	1998-2012
Micheal Ryan	2009-2020
