= Siar Sna... =

- Genre: documentary
- Narrated by: Eoghan Ó Riada
- Country of origin: Republic of Ireland
- Original languages: Irish; English
- No. of seasons: 5
- No. of episodes: 50

Production
- Production locations: Baile na hAbhann, Galway
- Running time: 25 minutes

Original release
- Network: TG4
- Release: July 1, 2005 – March 2010

Siar Sna... ([ʃiəɾˠ sˠnˠə], "back in the [decade name]") is an Irish documentary television programme, first broadcast in 2005. Each episode covers a particular year in Irish history, using archive material (mostly from RTÉ), on-screen text in English and contemporary music to tell the story of a particular year. It is similar in format to RTÉ's Reeling in the Years, but with less coverage of political and world events and an increased focus on the Gaeltacht, the Irish language, everyday life, culture and the Eurovision Song Contest.

Five series have been broadcast:

- Siar Sna Seachtóidí, Siar Sna 70s or Siar Sna 70idí ("Back in the Seventies"), ten episodes covering the years 1970–79, first aired in July–September 2005
- Siar Sna hOchtóidí, Siar Sna 80idí, Siar Sna 80s ("Back in the Eighties") or Siar Sna Blianta ("Back in the Years"), ten episodes covering the years 1980–89, first aired in September–December 2006
- Siar Sna 60idí, Siar Sna 60s ("Back in the Sixties"), ten episodes covering the years 1960–69, first aired in January–March 2007
- Siar Sna 90idí ("Back in the Nineties"), ten episodes covering the years 1990–99, first aired in January–March 2008
- Siar Sna 00's ("Back in the Noughties"), ten episodes covering the years 2000–09, first aired in January–March 2010

== Future ==
Due to COVID-19 TG4 delayed a 2010s 6th series broadcast since 2020. Plans for it could be made as of 2026 between now and 2029.

== Reception ==
In 2010, the Sunday Independent praised the series, saying that Siar Sna Seachtóidí was a "riveting social history of the Seventies […] which reassesses everything from that fateful decade's myriad campaigns for sex equality to the Dublin and Monaghan bombings."

The blogger The Cedar Lounge Revolution wrote of the 1979 episode, "Watching the footage it wasn't hard to believe that Ireland was in some small way a sort of cousin of the Eastern bloc. Everything was drab browns and grey. The news reports filled with shiny men's suits and flammable looking women's dresses".

== See also ==
- The Rock 'n' Roll Years (BBC)
- Reeling In the Years (RTÉ)
