= Virgin Media News at 8.00 =

Irish television news programme

- Also known as: Virgin Media News at 7.00; Virgin Media Evening News
- Presented by: Caroline Twohig
- Country of origin: Ireland
- Original language: English

Production
- Production locations: Dublin, Ireland
- Camera setup: Multi-camera
- Running time: 30 minutes
- Production company: Virgin Media Television

Original release
- Network: Virgin Media One
- Release: March 2015 - December 2016; August 2018 - present

Related
- Virgin Media News; Virgin Media News at 5.30

Virgin Media News at 7.00 (formerly News at 8.00) is the main primetime news programme on the Irish television network Virgin Media One (formerly known as "TV3"). It is produced by the Virgin Media News division.

The News at 7.00, presented by main newscaster Caroline Twohig, is a thirty-minute news programme covering Irish national and international news stories, broadcast at 7pm from Monday to Friday. It was previously broadcast at 8pm, before being pushed back in March 2022 to accommodate a permanent new schedule featuring extended episodes of UK soaps Coronation Street and Emmerdale.

== History ==
On 30 March 2015, TV3 announced that it will begin broadcasting a new main evening news programme at 8pm every weeknight.

In December 2016, the show was moved over to sister channel 3e after TV3 regained the rights to Coronation Street and Emmerdale. At the end of December 2016, TV3 News at 8 was discontinued.

A major rebrand of the entire TV3 Group took place in August 2018, when the company was renamed as Virgin Media Television, with all news output rebranded as Virgin Media News. News at 8.00 returned on the day of the rebrand, replacing the News at 7, which aired on Be3.

== Newscasters ==
=== Main newscaster ===
Years	Newscaster	Other roles
2018–present	Claire Brock	
2015–2016	Colette Fitzpatrick	News at 12.30, News at 5.30 presenter

=== Relief newscasters ===
Years	Newscaster	Other roles	Previous roles
2011–2012	Ruairi Carroll	News correspondent	
