= Gráinne Seoige =

Irish television journalist

- Born: 5 November 1973 (age 52); Spiddal, County Galway, Ireland
- Education: B.A. in English, Sociology and Political Science; Higher Diploma in Applied Communications for Television and Radio (through Irish)
- Alma mater: University College Galway
- Occupation: TV presenter
- Agent(s): Carol & Associates, carolandassociates.com
- Notable credit(s): Seoige; People of the Year Awards; The All Ireland Talent Show; Up for the Match; Put 'Em Under Pressure Daybreak
- Political party: Fianna Fáil
- Spouse: Stephen Cullinane (m. 2002; div. 2010) Leon Jordaan (m. 2019)
- Children: 1
- Relatives: Síle Seoige (sister)
- Website: www.grainneseoige.co.uk

Gráinne Seoige (Irish pronunciation: [ˈɡɾˠaːn̠ʲə ˈʃoːɟə]; born 5 November 1973) is an Irish journalist, news anchor and documentary and entertainment television presenter. A noted Irish language supporter, Seoige is the only television personality to have worked with all four Irish terrestrial television stations—TG4, TV3, RTÉ One and RTÉ2—and to have read the inaugural news bulletins on three separate channels—TG4, TV3, and Sky News Ireland.

She was a Fianna Fáil candidate for the Galway West constituency at the 2024 Irish general election, but was not elected.

== Early life ==
The eldest of four children, Seoige was born in Spiddal to Philomena and Mairtín Seoige. Gráinne's youngest sibling, her sister Síle, is also a television presenter. Gráinne was raised in Galway and attended Mercy Convent, Spiddal, before studying at University College Galway (UCG) and graduating with a B.A. in English, Sociology and Political Science. Seoige then went on to complete a Higher Diploma in Applied Communications for Television and Radio through Irish, also at UCG.

== Broadcasting career ==
=== TG4/TV3 ===
Seoige began her broadcasting career on Halloween, 31 October 1996, with the launch of Teilifís na Gaeilge (now TG4) anchoring the 10pm news bulletin with Gillian Ní Cheallaigh. She stayed at TG4 until 1998, when she was asked to be launch anchor with independent broadcaster TV3 and presented TV3's 5:30pm News (also known as First Edition) and 6:30pm News with Alan Cantwell. Seoige also hosted News Tonight, as well as producing, writing and presenting news updates throughout the day. She also presented occasionally, Ireland's only breakfast programme, TV3's breakfast show Ireland AM. Seoige was on air when the 9/11 terror attack happened and anchored over 7 hours of live news coverage alone that day.

=== Sky News ===
Seoige moved to Sky News Ireland and presented its news bulletins from 10 May 2004. She presented bulletins at Sky News headquarters anchoring on every programme between 12 midnight and 12 noon.

=== RTÉ ===
Seoige joined Ireland's main national broadcaster, RTÉ, in 2006. From 2006 to 2009, she co-presented an afternoon chat show, Seoige (also known as Seoige and O'Shea), with her sister Síle, while from 2011 to 2016 she co-presented the series Crimecall. Other high-profile roles for her at RTÉ included hosting the People of the Year Awards (2008), co-presenting the Up for the Match sport specials (2008), and presenting The All Ireland Talent Show (2009–2011) and the sports quiz show, Put 'Em Under Pressure.

Seoige also fronted documentary series for RTÉ, including Gráinne Seoige's Modern Life (2011) and Great Irish Journeys, which explored Ireland during the Great Famine. A fluent Irish speaker, Seoige often appears on Tell Me a Story, a programme on the subsidiary children's channel RTÉjr, in which she tells stories in Irish.

In 2022, Seoige appeared on the fifth series of the Irish version of Dancing With the Stars. She was partnered with John Nolan. The couple ended up finishing in 8th place.

=== ITV ===
During 2010, Seoige appeared regularly on British channel ITV, as a presenter on breakfast programme GMTV and as features editor on ITV Breakfast's morning programme Daybreak. She covered both national and international news.

=== BBC One ===
In 2011, she appeared on the BBC One series That's Britain covering issues including train overcrowding and energy prices.

== Political career ==
Seoige ran as a candidate for Fianna Fáil in Galway West at the 2024 general election. She received 2,929 first preference (4.9%) votes and was eliminated on the ninth count. In November 2025, Seoige described running in the election as "the biggest regret of my life". She later spoke about the abuse she had endured during the campaign when deepfake pornographic images of her were circulated on Meta's WhatsApp platform. She has since called for regulation of such technology.

== Personal life ==
Seoige has a son who was born when she was 20. In 2002, Seoige married former TV3 colleague and long-term partner Stephen Cullinane; they divorced in 2010. Seoige was honoured by NUI Galway in 2007 with an Alumni Award for her services to the Irish language.

Seoige announced her engagement to South African businessman and former rugby coach Leon Jordaan in 2014. In 2016, Seoige relocated to Pretoria, South Africa, and launched a bespoke diamond dealing business. Seoige and Jordaan married in December 2019.
