= 25 Years of Rock =

- Genre: Radio Broadcast
- Running time: One hour
- Country of origin: England
- Language: English
- Home station: BBC Radio 1
- TV adaptations: The Rock 'n' Roll Years
- Produced by: Trevor Dann
- No. of episodes: 25
- Other themes: "Oh Well" by Fleetwood Mac

25 Years of Rock is a 25-part radio series broadcast on BBC Radio 1 from 22 June to 7 December 1980. Each hour-long episode featured music and news stories from a year, starting with 1955 and finishing with 1979. The series encapsulated the period from the birth of rock and roll in 1955 to the post-punk era of the late seventies, and charted social and political events with a rock soundtrack. The series was repeated in 1981 between 4 April (1955) and 19 September (1979).

The series was produced by Trevor Dann. Its theme music was the instrumental section of "Oh Well" by Fleetwood Mac.

Taking 1955 as its start – the year "Rock Around the Clock" by Bill Haley & His Comets reached the UK Singles Chart – the series focused on music and the events up to 1979.

== Related media ==
- The Rock 'n' Roll Years

The Rock 'n' Roll Years was a television show that was adapted from the radio show. It was aired on the BBC.

- 30 Years of Rock

An extended version, 30 Years of Rock, was on Radio 1 in 1985. This consisted of the original series plus five new episodes covering 1980 to 1984. 30 Years Of Rock was broadcast on BBC Radio 1 from 1-2pm each week, between 20 April (1955) and 16 November (1984). A one-week gap was made due to the live broadcast of "Live Aid" on 13 July. The series was most recently repeated on BBC Radio 6 Music from 28 November 2015 and finished on 27 December 2015.

- 25 Years of Rock

A companion book by the same name was published by Hamlyn in 1980. (ISBN 0-600-37638-9)

== Original broadcast dates ==
- 1955 - 22/06/80
- 1956 - 29/06/80
- 1957 - 06/07/80
- 1958 - 13/07/80
- 1959 - 20/07/80
- 1960 - 27/07/80
- 1961 - 03/08/80
- 1962 - 10/08/80
- 1963 - 17/08/80
- 1964 - 24/08/80
- 1965 - 31/08/80
- 1966 - 07/09/80
- 1967 - 14/09/80
- 1968 - 21/09/80
- 1969 - 28/09/80
- 1970 - 05/10/80
- 1971 - 12/10/80
- 1972 - 19/10/80
- 1973 - 26/10/80
- 1974 - 02/11/80
- 1975 - 09/11/80
- 1976 - 16/11/80
- 1977 - 23/11/80
- 1978 - 30/11/80
- 1979 - 07/12/80

== See also ==
- "We Didn't Start the Fire" — a song by Billy Joel whose lyrics include brief references to significant political, cultural, scientific, and sporting events between 1948 and 1989.
