= TV3 News @ 6 =

- Created by: TV3 News
- Presented by: Alan Cantwell; Gráinne Seoige
- Country of origin: Ireland
- Original language: English

Production
- Production locations: TV3, Westgate Business Park, Dublin 24, Ireland
- Camera setup: Multi-camera
- Running time: 30-60 minutes

Original release
- Network: TV3
- Release: 20 September 1998 – 11 April 1999

Related
- First Edition; TV3 News @ 7

TV3 News @ 6 was the flagship evening news programme on the Irish television network TV3. It was produced by the TV3 News division.

The TV3 News @ 6, presented by main newscasters Alan Cantwell and Gráinne Seoige, was a sixty-minute news programme covering Irish national and international news stories, broadcast at 6:00pm from Monday to Friday.

At weekends the main evening bulletin also aired at 6:00pm but was reduced to thirty minutes.

== History ==
TV3 News @ 6 was the first programme broadcast by TV3 on opening night on 20 September 1998. The news programme provided a comprehensive view of the day's main international and national news stories and was in direct competition with RTÉ News: Six One. This period of direct rivalry with RTÉ only lasted for a year as poor ratings, due to the strength of the competition from RTÉ, resulted in TV3 deciding to break up the hour-long programme. Because of this two new programmes – First Edition at 5:30pm and TV3 News @ 7 – were launched. Both programmes were still fronted by Cantwell and Seoige, while First Edition became Ireland's first early evening news programme.

== Newscasters ==
=== Main newscaster ===
Years	Newscaster	Other roles	Previous roles
1998–1999	Alan Cantwell		
1998–1999	Gráinne Seoige		
