= The Rock 'n' Roll Years =

British television series

- Country of origin: United Kingdom
- Original language: English

Production
- Running time: 30 minutes
- Production company: British Broadcasting Corporation (BBC)

The Rock 'n' Roll Years is a BBC television programme aired between 1985 and 1994. Each week's half-hour episode featured news and music from a given year, starting with 1956 and ending with 1989. The idea of combining a year's news reports and music was adapted from the 1980 BBC Radio 1 series 25 Years of Rock.

The programme consisted mainly of archive clips of news and current affairs, whose original soundtracks were crossfaded with music hits of the time. Archive music performances also featured, mostly from BBC programmes such as Top of the Pops. Without presenters or voice-overs, the only non-archive additions were explanatory subtitles.

For instance, the programme on 1960 featured the Sharpeville massacre, the Soviets shooting down two US spy planes, the advent of stiletto heels and the election of John F. Kennedy to the White House, set to music by Adam Faith, Duane Eddy and the Rebels, Cliff Richard and the Shadows, The Everly Brothers and Roy Orbison.

The first three series were first aired over July and August in consecutive years: the first in 1985 covered the years 1956–63; the second in 1986 covered 1964–71, and the third in 1987 covered 1972–80. The fourth series, aired in March and April 1994, covered 1981–89.

The theme tune to the early series was a medley of riffs from various popular songs, including for example "(I Can't Get No) Satisfaction" by The Rolling Stones and "Layla" by Derek and the Dominos. For the fourth series, a similar medley was created using extracts from 1980s hits such as "Like a Virgin" by Madonna, "Radio Ga Ga" by Queen, "Every Breath You Take" by the Police, "Do They Know It's Christmas?" by Band Aid and "The Look of Love" by ABC.

== Series overview ==
Series	Episodes	Originally released	
Series	Episodes	First released	Last released
Pilot		3 May 1984	
1	8	7 July 1985	25 August 1985
2	8	30 June 1986	18 August 1986
3	9	29 June 1987	31 August 1987
4	9	2 March 1994	27 April 1994

== List of episodes ==
=== Pilot ===
No. overall	No. in series	Title	Original release date
1	1	"1966"	3 May 1984

=== Series 1 ===
No. overall	No. in series	Title	Original release date
2	1	"1956"	7 July 1985
3	2	"1957"	14 July 1985
4	3	"1958"	21 July 1985
5	4	"1959"	28 July 1985
6	5	"1960"	4 August 1985
7	6	"1961"	11 August 1985
8	7	"1962"	18 August 1985
9	8	"1963"	25 August 1985

=== Series 2 ===
No. overall	No. in series	Title	Original release date
10	1	"1964"	30 June 1986
11	2	"1965"	7 July 1986
12	3	"1966"	14 July 1986
13	4	"1967"	21 July 1986
14	5	"1968"	28 July 1986
15	6	"1969"	4 August 1986
16	7	"1970"	11 August 1986
17	8	"1971"	18 August 1986

=== Series 3 ===
No. overall	No. in series	Title	Original release date
18	1	"1972"	29 June 1987
19	2	"1973"	6 July 1987
20	3	"1974"	20 July 1987
21	4	"1975"	27 July 1987
22	5	"1976"	3 August 1987
23	6	"1977"	10 August 1987
24	7	"1978"	17 August 1987
25	8	"1979"	24 August 1987
26	9	"1980"	31 August 1987

=== Series 4 ===
No. overall	No. in series	Title	Original release date
27	1	"1981"	2 March 1994
28	2	"1982"	9 March 1994
29	3	"1983"	16 March 1994
30	4	"1984"	23 March 1994
31	5	"1985"	30 March 1994
32	6	"1986"	6 April 1994
33	7	"1987"	13 April 1994
34	8	"1988"	20 April 1994
35	9	"1989"	27 April 1994

== Similar formats ==
Other programmes with similar formats are:

- History Rocks on The History Channel
- Pop-up Video on VH1
- Reeling in the Years on RTÉ
- Siar Sna... on TG4
- Pop Goes Northern Ireland on BBC Northern Ireland
- Alba on BBC Alba
- That's So... on Channel 5
- Rewind on BBC Scotland
- Don't Look Back in Anger on Virgin Media Four

== Trivia ==
As part of his 1987 Christmas Special, Lenny Henry performed a spoof version of the show. He lampooned various artists including Mungo Jerry, Tina Turner and Michael Jackson.

Another version of the show appeared online only on the BBC's Doctor Who website in 2004, covering the adventures of the Doctor from the 1960s to the 1980s, using footage from the sci-fi series and accompanying music from each of the decades as per the regular format of the show.

== See also ==
- "We Didn't Start the Fire" — a song by Billy Joel whose lyrics include brief references to significant political, cultural, scientific, and sporting events between 1948 and 1989.
