= Fanning at Whelans =

Irish TV music show

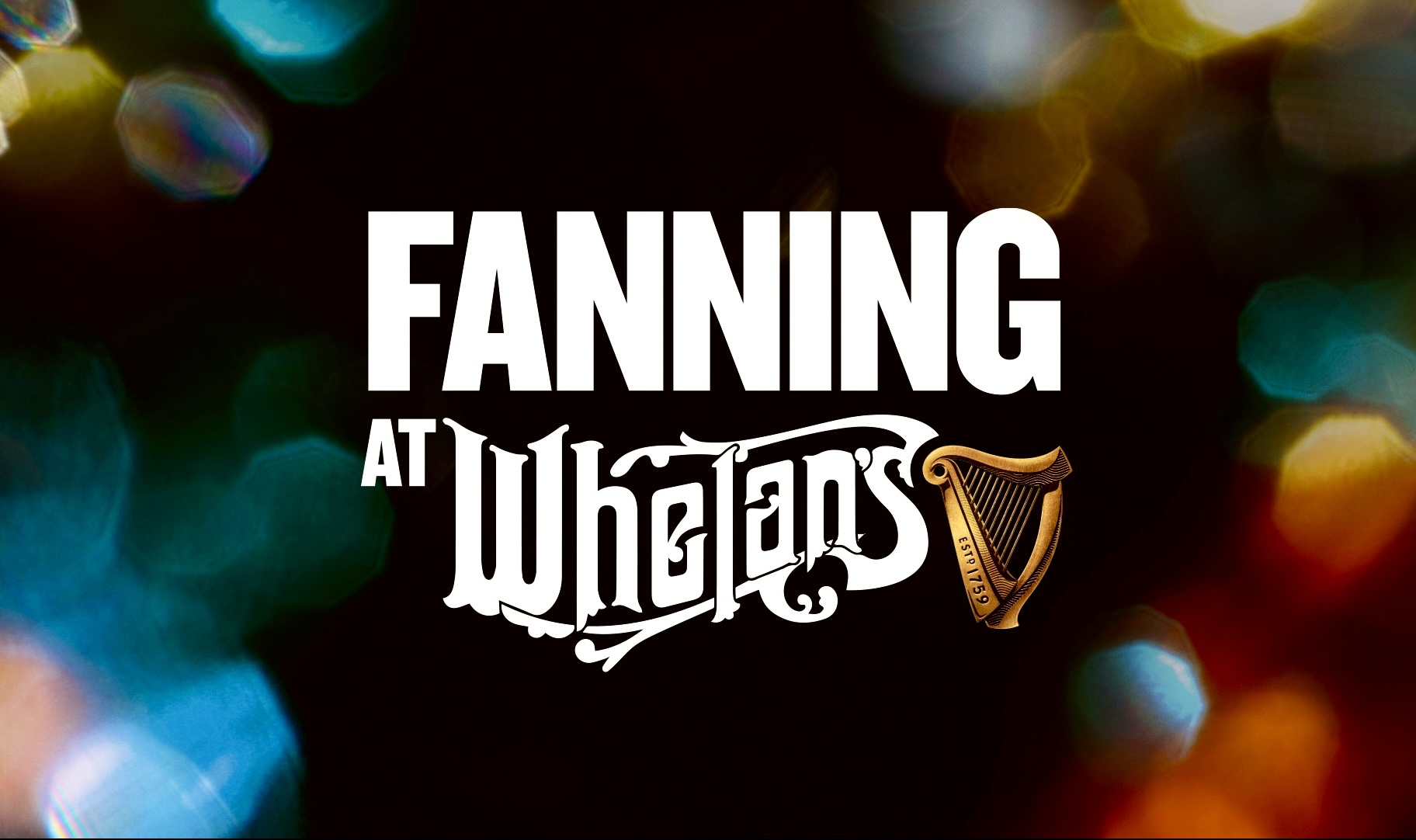
- Fanning At Whelans logo
- Directed by: Mark Quinn
- Presented by: Dave Fanning
- Country of origin: Republic of Ireland

Production
- Producer: Ursula Courtney Ian Wilson Jack Fanning Rosie Wall
- Production locations: Whelans, Dublin
- Cinematography: Ken O'Mahony
- Editor: Highwire Post Production
- Running time: 45 minutes
- Production company: Bebbak Ltd.

Original release
- Network: Virgin Media Television
- Release: 2020 – present

Fanning At Whelans is an Irish music television series, that celebrates the Irish music scene.

The programmes are presented by Dave Fanning from Whelan's, in Wexford Street, Dublin.

The show consists of live music from both up-and-coming and established Irish bands/artists from varying genres. It is broadcast on Virgin Media TV.

== History ==
During the COVID-19 pandemic in the Republic of Ireland, Fanning was concerned that the Irish music industry was in trouble and Irish musicians were not able to tour and therefore earn a living. In November 2020, he teamed up with long-time producer Ian Wilson, and through his production company Bebbak Ltd, acquired funding from Whelans and Guinness to record a series of gigs with no audience. The aim of the production was to get the bands/artists and film crew paid during a time when there was no other work available in their industry. This became season one of Fanning at Whelan's. According to Meath Chronicle, "There is no Irish broadcaster that has done more to give young bands a much-needed break."

Appearances to date include Dark Tropics, Emily 7, Saibh Skelly. and guest interviewees Bob Geldof and Domhnall Gleeson.

The third series began in December 2023.

== Format ==
The show consists of five to six live music performances per episode. Each episode also features a well-known Irish guest who is interviewed about their favourite music.
