= Reeling In the Years =

Irish television series

- Title card from the first series
- Genre: History
- Opening theme: "Reelin' In the Years"
- Country of origin: Ireland
- Original language: English
- No. of series: 6
- No. of episodes: 58

Production
- Producer: John O'Regan
- Running time: 25 minutes

Original release
- Network: RTÉ One
- Release: 6 September 1999 – present

Related
- 100 Years

Reeling in the Years is a television series shown on the Irish public broadcaster RTÉ.

Each episode, running for about 25 minutes, reviews the events of a particular selected year, from 1962 to 2019. News archive footage features, along with subtitles as the means of narration, to recount important national and international events of the time. Music from the selected year plays across the footage, with occasional scenes of live performances or music videos, often (but not exclusively) by an Irish artist. No advertisements are shown during the broadcast (apart from occasional advertisements dating from the relevant year). Each decade takes at least eight months to make.

The theme tune for the series comes from Steely Dan's 1972 song "Reelin' In the Years". The six series are marked by a knowing attitude, where certain stories that seemed inconsequential at the time are remembered because they have taken on significance in the present day. This has gained the programme a reputation for its humour. An example is seen in the 1987 episode: Taoiseach Charles Haughey discusses what he would do if he were to win money in the newly formed National Lottery. Haughey, whose lavish lifestyle was later revealed to have been funded by "donations" from businessmen, exclaims, "I might keep a bit for myself!".

A 2008 poll (conducted by the RTÉ Guide) of Ireland's Top 100 television programmes resulted in Reeling in the Years being voted "most popular home-produced TV programme ever". In 2008, a DVD—Reeling in the 80s—was released for the Irish market—with follow-up DVDs Reeling in the 90s and Reeling in the 70s released in 2009 and 2010, respectively.

== Episode list ==
=== Original series ===
The original series focused on the 1980s and first aired on Monday nights from 6 September to 8 November 1999.

Year	Music
1980	ABBA, Bagatelle, Boomtown Rats, Blondie, The Clash, T.R. Dallas, John Lennon, Johnny Logan, The Nolans, Queen, Brendan Shine, Split Enz, U2, Dennis Waterman
1981	Big Tom, The Blades, The Boomtown Rats, Phil Collins, Joe Dolan, Electric Light Orchestra, Foster and Allen, The Fureys and Davey Arthur, New Order, OMD, The Police, Queen/David Bowie, The Rolling Stones, Talking Heads, The Undertones
1982	Irene Cara, Clannad, The Clash, De Danann, Dexy's Midnight Runners, Dire Straits, Fun Boy Three, The Human League, Phil Lynott, Madness, Tears for Fears, Tight Fit, Yazoo
1983	Bananarama, The Clash, David Bowie, Elton John, Eurythmics, Madness, Michael Jackson, Howard Jones, Phil Lynott, Christy Moore, New Order, Paddy Reilly, Van Morrison, Paul Young
1984	Band Aid, Eurythmics, Frankie Goes to Hollywood, Howard Jones, Madonna, Nik Kershaw, Cyndi Lauper, John Lennon, The Smiths, Talk Talk, Tears for Fears, U2, Wham!
1985	Paul Brady, The Concerned, The Cure, Eurythmics, Nik Kershaw, Feargal Sharkey, Simple Minds, The Smiths, Talking Heads, Tears for Fears, U2
1986	Mary Black, Bon Jovi, Chris de Burgh, Dire Straits, The Housemartins, Dermot Morgan, Billy Ocean, Simply Red, The Waterboys, Wham!
1987	Rick Astley, Crowded House, Curiosity Killed The Cat, Daniel O'Donnell/Dana, Johnny Logan, M/A/R/R/S, Microdisney, New Order, The Pogues, U2, Wet Wet Wet
1988	The Adventures, Aslan, Belinda Carlisle, Celine Dion, Enya, Whitney Houston, Bobby McFerrin, Kylie Minogue, Morrissey, Sinéad O'Connor, The Pogues, The Primitives, Republic of Ireland national football team, U2
1989	The 4 of Us, Mary Black, Black Box, Boy Meets Girl, Cher, Guns N' Roses, Billy Joel, The Stone Roses, U2, Van Morrison

=== Second series ===
The second series focused on the 1990s and first aired on Monday nights from 11 September to 27 November 2000 except on 30 October and 13 November. New series would be aired biennially rather than annual until 2004 due to Film records pre-1980.

Year	Music
1990	The B-52's, The Charlatans, Jack Charlton/Ireland national football team, EMF, Enigma, The La's, Happy Mondays, Liam Harrison/Goal celebrities, Kylie Minogue, Luciano Pavarotti, The Saw Doctors, Sinéad O'Connor, Something Happens
1991	Bryan Adams, The Big Geraniums, Blur, Color Me Badd, Enya, Extreme, Chesney Hawkes, Michael Jackson, James, Lenny Kravitz, The Mock Turtles, R.E.M., U2, The Wonder Stuff
1992	Tasmin Archer, Charles & Eddie, Daniel O'Donnell, Whitney Houston, The Lightning Seeds, Linda Martin, Opus III, Red Hot Chili Peppers, John Secada, The Shamen, Stereo MCs, The Sultans of Ping FC, U2
1993	The Beloved, Björk/David Arnold, Garth Brooks, The Cranberries, The Frank and Walters, 4 Non Blondes, Gabrielle, House of Pain, Niamh Kavanagh, Pet Shop Boys, Take That
1994	A House, Boyzone, The Cranberries, Crowded House, Deep Forest, Paul Harrington/Charlie McGettigan, Oasis, Perez 'Prez' Prado, R.E.M., Shampoo, Bill Whelan/Anúna/RTÉ Concert Orchestra, Whigfield
1995	Blur, Boyzone, Bobby Brown, The Corrs, McAlmont and Butler, Massive Attack, Oasis, Secret Garden, Sinéad O'Connor/Shane MacGowan, Take That
1996	Ash, Blur, Dodgy, Gina G, Richie Kavanagh, Manic Street Preachers, Alanis Morissette, Eimear Quinn, Radiohead, Spice Girls, Suede
1997	All Saints, Boyzone, The Corrs, Hanson, Katrina and the Waves, OTT, Spice Girls, Texas, U2, The Verve
1998	B*Witched, The Cardigans, Catatonia, The Corrs, Jay-Z, Manic Street Preachers, Massive Attack, George Michael, Spice Girls, U2
1999	Basement Jaxx, B*Witched, The Cardigans, Fat Boy Slim, Lauryn Hill, Ronan Keating, Britney Spears, Stereophonics, Westlife

=== Third series ===
The third series focused on the 1970s and first aired on Tuesday nights from 10 September to 12 November 2002.

Year	Music
1970	The Beatles, Blue Mink, Canned Heat, Dana, Desmond Dekker and the Aces, The Emeralds, Marmalade, Norman Greenbaum, The Jackson Five, Edison Lighthouse, Elvis Presley, Poppy Family, James Taylor
1971	Lynn Anderson, Angela Farrell, Curtis Mayfield, Middle of the Road, The Moody Blues, Gilbert O'Sullivan, Clodagh Rogers, Severine, Simon and Garfunkel, The Sweet, T. Rex, The Who
1972	Roberta Flack, Michael Jackson, Johnny Nash, Gilbert O'Sullivan, Slade, Timmy Thomas, Jackie Wilson, Neil Young
1973	The Carpenters, Dawn, The Detroit Emeralds, Elton John, Horslips, Gilbert O'Sullivan, Stealers Wheel, The Sweet, Thin Lizzy, T. Rex
1974	Abba, Bachman-Turner Overdrive, Ken Boothe, Rory Gallagher, The Hollies, Tony Kenny, New Seekers, Status Quo, The Three Degrees, Barry White
1975	10cc, Abba, Dana, David Essex, KC and the Sunshine Band, Fran O'Toole, Queen, The Swarbriggs, The Sweet
1976	Abba, The Bellamy Brothers, Brotherhood of Man, The Eagles, Hot Chocolate, Horslips, Billy Ocean, Red Hurley, Sutherland Brothers/Quiver, Thin Lizzy
1977	The Boomtown Rats, Boney M, Gladys Knight/The Pips, Fleetwood Mac, Billy Ocean, Elvis Presley, Sex Pistols, Status Quo, Rod Stewart, Thin Lizzy
1978	Blue Öyster Cult, Boney M, The Boomtown Rats, Chic, Electric Light Orchestra, Yvonne Elliman, Genesis, Gloria, The Jacksons 5, U2 (previously The Hype), The Undertones
1979	M, Police, Boomtown Rats, Michael Jackson, Art Garfunkel, Madness, Village People, Brendan Shine, Blondie & John Williams

=== Fourth series ===
The fourth series focused on the 1960s (1962 to 1969 only) and first aired on Friday nights from 10 September to 29 October 2004. It features neither 1960 nor 1961 as these pre-date the official launch of Telefís Éireann, the television arm of the national broadcaster. It was felt, presumably, that there would be too little archive material from which to make an engaging programme about these years. Indeed, the episodes covering the first half of the 1960s are characterised by extensive use of photographs and posters, as opposed to film and video footage, to represent various historical events. Although the opening night of New Year's Eve 1961 features in at the start of the 1962 programme.

Year	Music
1962	Neil Sedaka, The Beatles, Ketty Lester, The Tokens, Chubby Checker, Cliff Richard, Patsy Cline, Celine Dion, The Drifters, The Ronnie Drew Group, Roy Orbison
1963	The Beatles, Dusty Springfield, The Crystals, Bob Dylan, Roy Orbison, Bobby Vee, Gerry and the Pacemakers, Cliff Richard
1964	The Beatles, Petula Clark, The Animals, Millie Small, Gerry and the Pacemakers, Mary Wells, The Beach Boys, Dionne Warwick, The Supremes, The Bachelors
1965	Brendan Bowyer & The Royal Showband, Butch Moore, Donovan, The Hollies, The Rolling Stones, Sonny & Cher, The Temptations, Val Doonican
1966	Chris Farlowe, Dickie Rock, Fontella Bass, Nancy Sinatra, The Rolling Stones, Simon & Garfunkel, The Supremes, Tom Jones, The Who
1967	Van Morrison, The Dubliners, The Monkees, Jimi Hendrix, Bob Dylan, Simon & Garfunkel, Engelbert Humperdinck, The Rolling Stones, Sean Dunphy, Sandie Shaw
1968	The Foundations, Cliff Richard, Pat McGeegan, Massiel, The Moody Blues, Manfred Mann, Smokey Robinson & The Miracles, The Rolling Stones, Marvin Gaye, Tom Jones
1969	Christy Moore, Fleetwood Mac, Herman's Hermits, Jackie Wilson, Lulu, Muriel Day, The Rolling Stones, Smokey Robinson & The Miracles, Stevie Wonder, Thunderclap Newman

=== Fifth series ===
The fifth series focused on the 2000s and first aired on Sunday nights from 17 October to 26 December 2010 except on 28 November due to European Financial Stabilisation Mechanism coverage.

Year	Music
2000	Blink 182 – "All the Small Things", Chicane – "No Ordinary Morning", The Corrs – "Breathless", Elementfour – "Big Brother UK TV Theme", Five – "Don't Wanna Let You Go", Ronan Keating – "Life Is a Rollercoaster", Toploader – "Dancing in the Moonlight", U2 – "Beautiful Day", Westlife – "Fool Again"
2001	Ash – "Shining Light", Emma Bunton – "What Took You So Long?", David Gray – "This Year's Love", Ronan Keating – "Lovin' Each Day", Samantha Mumba – "Always Come Back to Your Love", Radiohead – "Pyramid Song", Texas – "Inner Smile", U2 – "Stuck in a Moment You Can't Get Out Of"
2002	Coldplay – "In My Place", Elvis Presley vs. JXL – "A Little Less Conversation", Jerry Fish & The Mudbug Club – "True Friends", Avril Lavigne – "Complicated", Kylie Minogue – "Love at First Sight", Pink – "Get the Party Started", Six – "There's a Whole Lot of Loving Going On", Sugababes – "Round Round", Westlife – "World of Our Own"
2003	Paddy Casey – "Saints and Sinners", Coldplay – "Clocks", The Darkness – "I Believe in a Thing Called Love", Mickey Joe Harte – "We've Got the World", Jamelia – "Superstar", Junior Senior – "Move Your Feet", Mis-Teeq – "Scandalous", The Thrills – "One Horse Town", Will Young – "Leave Right Now"
2004	Anastacia – "Left Outside Alone", Black Eyed Peas – "Let's Get It Started", Counting Crows – "Accidentally in Love", Keane – "Everybody's Changing", Kylie Minogue – "I Believe in You", Tim O'Riordan and Natural Gas – "The Langer", O-Zone – "Dragostea din tei", Outkast – "Hey Ya!", Snow Patrol – "Run", U2 – "Vertigo"
2005	Caesars – "Jerk It Out", Katie Melua – "Nine Million Bicycles", Moby – "Lift Me Up", Daniel Powter – "Bad Day", Stereophonics – "Dakota", KT Tunstall – "Other Side of the World", U2 – "Sometimes You Can't Make It on Your Own"
2006	Bell X1 – "Flame", Gemma Hayes – "Undercover", Gnarls Barkley – "Crazy", Peter Bjorn and John – "Young Folks", Pat Shortt – "Jumbo Breakfast Roll", Snow Patrol – "Chasing Cars", Sugababes – "Red Dress", Will Young – "All Time Love"
2007	Duke Special – "Freewheel", Fergie – "Glamorous", Girls Aloud – "Call the Shots", The Killers – "Read My Mind", Klaxons – "Golden Skans", Mika – "Grace Kelly", Razorlight – "Before I Fall to Pieces", Robyn – "With Every Heartbeat", Sugababes – "About You Now", Timbaland feat. OneRepublic – "Apologize"
2008	Alphabeat – "Fascination", Coldplay – "Viva la Vida", Dustin the Turkey – "Irelande Douze Pointe", Elbow – "One Day Like This", Glen Hansard/Markéta Irglová – "Falling Slowly", Iglu & Hartly – "In This City", Mundy/Sharon Shannon – "Galway Girl", Katy Perry – "Hot n Cold", Republic of Loose feat. Isabella Reyes-Feeney – "The Steady Song", Sam Sparro – "Black and Gold", The Script – "Breakeven", Jordin Sparks – "No Air"
2009	Black Eyed Peas – "I Gotta Feeling", The Coronas – "Listen Dear", Florence and the Machine – "Cosmic Love", Lisa Hannigan – "Lille", Kings of Leon – "Use Somebody", Lady Gaga – "Poker Face", La Roux – "Bulletproof", The Temper Trap – "Sweet Disposition", Westlife – "What About Now"

=== Sixth series ===
The sixth series focused on the 2010s was produced in 2021, and was broadcast on RTÉ One on Sunday nights from 11 April to 13 June 2021.

Year	Music
2010	Adele – "Rolling in the Deep", B.o.B feat. Hayley Williams – "Airplanes", Biffy Clyro – "Many of Horror", Eminem feat. Rihanna – "Love the Way You Lie", Flo Rida feat. David Guetta – "Club Can't Handle Me", Maroon 5 – "Misery", Owl City – "Fireflies", Pink – "Raise Your Glass", The Rubberbandits – "Horse Outside", Two Door Cinema Club – "Something Good Can Work"
2011	Adele – "Rumour Has It", Sara Bareilles and Ingrid Michaelson – "Winter Song", Florence and the Machine – "Shake It Out", CeeLo Green – "Forget You", Imelda May – "Inside Out", One Direction – "What Makes You Beautiful", Rihanna feat. Calvin Harris – "We Found Love", Maverick Sabre – "I Need", Ed Sheeran – "Lego House"
2012	Adele – "Set Fire to the Rain", Bat for Lashes – "Laura", Nathan Carter – "Wagon Wheel", Gotye feat. Kimbra – "Somebody That I Used to Know", Lisa Hannigan – "What'll I Do", Carly Rae Jepsen – "Call Me Maybe", Little Green Cars – "The John Wayne", Nicki Minaj – "Starships", The Script feat. will.i.am – "Hall of Fame", Taylor Swift – "We Are Never Ever Getting Back Together"
2013	Avicii – "Wake Me Up", Bastille – "Pompeii", Birdy – "Wings", Daft Punk feat. Pharrell Williams and Nile Rodgers – "Get Lucky", Hozier – "Take Me to Church", Imagine Dragons – "On Top of the World", Kodaline – "Brand New Day", London Grammar – "Strong", Macklemore & Ryan Lewis feat. Ray Dalton – "Can't Hold Us", Seo Linn agus TG Lurgan, Villagers – "Nothing Arrived"
2014	Charli XCX – "Boom Clap", Clean Bandit feat. Jess Glynne – "Rather Be", Coldplay – "A Sky Full of Stars", George Ezra – Blame It on Me", Nico & Vinz – "Am I Wrong", Pitbull feat. Ke$ha – "Timber", The Riptide Movement – "All Works Out", Ryan Sheridan – "Home", U2 – "Every Breaking Wave", Pharrell Williams – "Happy"
2015	Adele – "Hello", James Bay – "Hold Back the River", Coldplay – "Adventure of a Lifetime", Gavin James – "Bitter Pill", Kodaline – "Honest", Major Lazer feat. MØ and DJ Snake – "Lean On", Iarla Ó Lionáird, Soak – "Blud", U2 – "Song for Someone", Lilly Wood and The Prick feat. Robin Schulz – "Prayer in C", Years & Years – "Shine"
2016	Justin Bieber – "What Do You Mean?", Patrick Cassidy feat. Sibéal, DNCE – "Cake by the Ocean", Calvin Harris feat. Rihanna – "This Is What You Came For", Zara Larsson – "Lush Life", Lukas Graham – "7 Years", Picture This – "Take My Hand", Saint Sister – "Castles", Sia feat. Kendrick Lamar – "The Greatest", Walking on Cars – "Speeding Cars"
2017	Clean Bandit feat. Zara Larsson – "Symphony", Damien Dempsey – "Soulsun", Calvin Harris feat. Frank Ocean and Migos – "Slide", Niall Horan – "Slow Hands", Jax Jones feat. Raye – "You Don't Know Me", Lyra – "Emerald", P!nk – "What About Us", Rag'n'Bone Man – "Human", Ed Sheeran – "Galway Girl", Harry Styles – "Sign of the Times"
2018	George Ezra – "Shotgun", Jess Glynne – "I'll Be There", Ariana Grande – "Thank U, Next", Hozier feat. Mavis Staples – "Nina Cried Power", Dermot Kennedy – "Power Over Me", Kygo feat. Miguel – "Remind Me to Forget", Marshmello feat. Bastille – "Happier", Rita Ora – "Anywhere", Portugal. The Man – "Feel It Still", Freya Ridings – "Lost Without You", Wild Youth – "Can't Move On"
2019	Lewis Capaldi – "Someone You Loved", Halsey – "Without Me", Niall Horan – "Nice to Meet Ya", Dermot Kennedy – "Outnumbered", Lil Nas X – "Old Town Road", Post Malone – "Circles", Regard – "Ride It", Mark Ronson feat. Miley Cyrus – "Nothing Breaks Like a Heart", Soulé feat. C Cane – "Love Tonight", Tones & I – "Dance Monkey"

== Copyright and DVD release ==
Each edition of Reeling in the Years opens with the logo and the featured year on top. The above example shows the 1984 edition.

In the past, RTÉ had said that, because of the number of clips from external companies used in the series, it would be infeasible to release it on VHS or DVD. It claimed that securing "video clearance" for each clip and song would make any release prohibitively expensive. RTÉ did consider releasing an altered version of the programme which would only contain the images and music that they owned the rights to, but that "the programme would only be half as good then, it wouldn't be anything like the shows that went out on air, and we'd end up disappointing people."

However, in October 2008, RTÉ announced that they would be releasing a DVD of a cut-down version of the 1980s material. Reeling in the 80s is an altered version of the programme which contains only the images and music that the producers were able to secure rights to, and it runs to about 150 minutes (versus 240 minutes for the original series). It does, however, contain some original material that has been unearthed since 1999, and which has greater significance now, such as footage of former Taoiseach Brian Cowen.

Reeling in the 90s was released on 13 November 2009, while Reeling in the 70s was released in November 2010.

The Reeling in the decades Boxset was released in 2011 which collected the 70s, 80s and 90s DVDs in one boxset.

=== DVD discography ===
- Reeling in the 80s (2008)
- Reeling in the 90s (2009)
- Reeling in the 70s (2010)

== Legacy ==
In recent years, Reeling in the Years has been used regularly by RTÉ One as a filler programme during the spring months all the way through to the Christmas period. It currently is shown at 18:30 on Sunday evenings if there is no talent programme or documentary and most bank holidays, when there is no EastEnders it usually fills the 20:00 slot on Mondays or Fridays or even 19:30 slot on Tuesdays or Thursdays. This has led to some interesting parallels with real-life events. When Cian O'Connor won his bronze medal at the 2012 Summer Olympics, RTÉ showed the 2004 episode of Reeling in the Years, complete with Anne Doyle's announcement that O'Connor was to be stripped of his gold medal won at the 2004 Summer Olympics. The next day RTÉ showed the 2005 episode of Reeling in the Years, complete with the announcement that London had secured the 2012 Summer Olympics with then-British Prime Minister Tony Blair reacting by saying what a momentous day it was for neighbouring Britain, followed by footage of the 7 July 2005 London bombings, which occurred the following day.

A website ranked editions of Reeling in the Years in order of the "most and least depressing" – least were 1994, 2004 and 2007; most were 1981, 1986 and 2008.

== Ending ==
All (1999-2004) broadcasts have the logo and the end with the broadcast year in the same size and as opening.

2010 broadcasts have a smaller sized logo at the end.

2021 broadcasts have no logo at the end.

== Similar programmes ==
=== Ireland ===
The Irish language station TG4 broadcast a similar programme called Siar Sna.... TV3 (now Virgin Media One) aired a programme called series Those Were the Days in 2011 with a focus on pop music followed by Don't Look Back in Anger in 2018.RTE also broadcast a dates programme in 2000 called 100 Years presented by Brian Farrell. BBC Northern Ireland produced five seasons of Pop Goes Northern Ireland based on the same premise, spanning the years 1963-2002.

=== Other countries ===
In Britain, the BBC produced a similar series in the early 2000s, called "I Love...", in which public figures discuss the pop culture of each year.

The Spanish version of Reeling in the Years (Los Años del No-Do) began airing in 2013 and is produced by the Spanish state-owned television and radio broadcaster RTVE. The word "No-Do" is a shortened name for Noticiarios y Documentales (News and Documentaries). Following the same format of Reeling in the Years, Los Años del No-Do encompasses the years from 1943 to 1981. It has been associated containing propaganda to support the Spanish caudillo Franco who ruled Spain from 1936 to 1975.

In Norway, the public broadcaster NRK produced a similar series, "Back to the xx-ies" ("Tilbake til xx-tallet") covering the 1960s ("Tilbake til 60-tallet"), 1970s ("Tilbake til 70-tallet"), 1980s ("Tilbake til 80-tallet") and 1990s ("Tilbake til 90-tallet"). They were produced as four series each of 10 episodes covering one year of their respective decade - 40 episodes in total. Different from the "Reeling in the Years" series was that persons prominent in the year covered by an episode also narrated on-screen.

== See also ==
- RTÉ Libraries and Archives, from which much footage is taken
- Timeline of Irish history
- The Rock 'n' Roll Years, the producer's inspiration for Reeling in the Years
