= Agenda (Irish TV programme) =

- Genre: Current affairs
- Created by: Fastnet Films
- Presented by: David McWilliams
- Country of origin: Ireland
- Original language: English

Production
- Producer: Niamh O'Connor
- Production locations: TV3, Westgate Business Park, Dublin 24, Ireland
- Camera setup: Multi-camera
- Running time: 60 minutes

Original release
- Network: TV3
- Release: 21 November 1999 – 14 August 2004

Agenda was an Irish weekly current affairs television programme broadcast by TV3 between 1999 and 2004. Produced by Fastnet Films, the programme focused on the top current affairs and business issues of the week.

Agenda returned to TV3 in October 2016.
