= Alan Cantwell =

Irish journalist

- Born: Alan Cantwell; 1968 (age 57–58); Dún Laoghaire, Dublin, Ireland
- Occupations: Journalist, presenter, newsreader
- Years active: 1985-present
- Notable credit: TV3 News
- Spouse: Denise Cantwell
- Children: Charlotte Cantwell

Alan Cantwell (born 1968) is an Irish journalist, presenter and newsreader, best known as the former anchor of TV3 News at 5.30 and later the 5.30.

== Career ==
Cantwell began his broadcasting career at the age of seventeen working in pirate radio in Dublin. He spent a number of years working with Capitol Radio under the pseudonym of Dave Carney. He later joined legitimate radio when he moved to Clare FM in the early 1990s. He spent five years here as head of news and current affairs. He subsequently became editor-in-chief of Independent Network News (INN) in Dublin. He later joined 98FM as host of a popular late-night chat show.

In 1998 Cantwell joined TV3 when the new station launched in September that year. Until November 2012 . Cantwell was the station's lead male newsreader. When TV3 launched Midday in 2008, Cantwell was included as one of the presenters along with Colette Fitzpatrick and Martin King. His stint in this role proved controversial and earned him the nickname "Alan Rantwell"; he was dropped from the programme after just a year as presenter. His removal was part of a wider shake-up of the programme.

In May 2011, Cantwell fronted TV3's television coverage of Queen Elizabeth II's state visit to Ireland.

On 22 November 2012, Cantwell announced that he is to leave TV3 and he subsequently resigned from his position as TV3 news anchor on 4 January 2013.

On 28 November 2012, he was startled live on air by a loud noise which visibly shook him.

In October 2015 it was announced that Cantwell would be returning to the station after a two-year absence.

In May 2016 Cantwell resigned from TV3 again, to take up the post of press advisor to Mary Mitchell O'Connor after the Dún Laoghaire TD was appointed to Cabinet as jobs minister. In November 2016 it was announced he was resigning, citing “personal reasons”.

Since leaving TV3 (now Virgin Media Television) in 2016 Cantwell has been involved in the publishing industry and has acted as both a presenter and new reader on Newstalk & LMFM. He has cover presented Breakfast Briefing on Newstalk and was formerly the presenter of a the news and current affairs show of The Agenda on LMFM. He has also presented other shows for Newstalk. He currently holds a senior role in publishing industry in Ireland (educational publishing) and also continues his work with Newstalk and LMFM as a journalist & presenter. He currently is a public relations executive in the educational books publishing industry in Ireland along with his radio work.

== Personal life ==
Cantwell is married and has two children.
