= Colette Fitzpatrick =

Irish news anchor (born 1974)

- Born: June 1974 (age 52); Holycross, Thurles, County Tipperary, Ireland
- Education: Dublin Institute of Technology
- Occupation: TV News Anchor / Broadcaster / Reporter / Journalist/
- Employer: Virgin Media Television
- Partner: Niall McDermott

Colette Fitzpatrick (born 25 June 1974) is one of the main news anchors at Virgin Media News (formerly known as "TV3 News"), since September 2006. She is a native of Holycross, Thurles, County Tipperary.

Fitzpatrick is a Virgin Media News anchor. She presents the weekday bulletins: News at 12.30 and News at 5.30. She has also hosted the prime time current affairs show Midweek.

Fitzpatrick began working in the TV3 newsroom in March 2001. She has edited and anchored bulletins for the morning news programme Ireland AM and also reported on a range issues for the main evening news. She reported from Kashmir on the aftermath of the earthquake. She was also a regular stand-in as main presenter on Ireland AM alongside Mark Cagney, Alan Hughes and Aidan Cooney. Fitzpatrick previously hosted a weekly show from 9-10 am on a Sunday morning on Newstalk called The Colette Fitzpatrick Show which ran from August 2015- February 2017 ( Fitzpatrick did her job with TV3 /now Virgin Media Television during the time she was working with Newstalk).

Fitzpatrick also previously worked in the newsroom in Today FM where she edited and presented hourly bulletins and reported on a range of stories including courts and tribunals. She produced The Sunday Supplement, presented by Sam Smyth, and also previously worked at East Coast FM in County Wicklow where she first began her broadcasting career. Colette graduated in journalism from DIT in Aungier Street.

Fitzpatrick has also worked in the newsroom at East Coast FM.

Fitzpatrick is married to studio director Niall McDermot. In June 2010, Fitzpatrick confirmed that she was expecting her first child, due in November. Son Milo was born on 18 November 2010, but it was a nightmare birth as chronicled by Fitzpatrick herself.
