= Virgin Media News =

Irish television news service

- Also known as: TV3 News (1998–2017); 3News Ireland (2017–2018)
- Presented by: Colette Fitzpatrick; Geraldine Lynagh
- Country of origin: Ireland
- Original language: English

Production
- Production locations: Dublin, Ireland
- Camera setup: Multi-camera
- Running time: 25 minutes
- Production company: Virgin Media Television

Original release
- Network: Virgin Media One; Virgin Media Two; Virgin Media Three
- Release: 20 September 1998 – present

Virgin Media News (formerly TV3 News and then 3News Ireland) is the news division of Virgin Media Television in Ireland, owned by Liberty Global. The news division produces news and current affairs programming for free-to-air channels Virgin Media One, Virgin Media Two, and Virgin Media Three; online (virginmediatelevision.ie), on streaming (Virgin Media Play), and on mobile.

Its flagship programme is the daily evening news from 5.30 pm with Colette Fitzpatrick; other programmes include news bulletins on Ireland AM, News at 12:30 and News at 7.

== History ==
=== Early years ===
The service was first launched on September 20, 1998, then branded as TV3 News and later as 3News hosted by Grainne Seoige and Alan Cantwell. Virgin Media News launched its first news bulletin on September 20, 1998 under the TV3 News @ 6 branding airing Monday – Friday for an hour at 18:00, with half an hour bulletins on Saturdays and Sundays. A year later following a failed attempt to compete with RTÉ News: Six One this bulletin was moved to 17:30 and 19:00. Following the TV3 Group's acquisition of content from ITV and a schedule change the 19:00 bulletin was moved to News @ 6.30 eventually being dropped in April 2007. For a time, the 17:30 programme was called First Edition.

TV3 News Tonight, Late Edition or Nightly News was first broadcast on Monday 21 September 1998 at 23:00. It aired at 23:00 each weeknight for 30 minutes. It was hosted by either of its two main anchors each taking alternative nights. In 2008, TV3 News axed the late news in preference for TV3 Nightly News with Vincent Browne which also aired for 30 minutes until 2009 when the show was rebranded as Tonight with Vincent Browne. TV3 Nightly News continued to air on Friday nights until 2009 when it was replaced with The Political Party.

=== Later years ===
Following with tradition of other European broadcasters, the broadcaster began a news service from Monday 30 March 2015. 'TV3 News at 8' has the same format as The 5:30 and The 12:30. Many European broadcasters have a news programme among its primetime schedule. In 2017, €3 million was invested in news output by the broadcaster featuring a "state of the art" studio which launched on 4 September 2017.

=== Sponsorship controversy ===
From September 2009, the programme was renamed Tonight with Vincent Browne, after a deal was signed with Bank of Scotland (Ireland) to sponsor the programme. Due to legislation from the Broadcasting Commission of Ireland and similar European Union rules preventing a news programme from being sponsored, it was no longer to be branded as "TV3 News" and officially considered to be an "entertainment/lifestyle" programme rather than news or current affairs. The CEO of TV3 David McRedmond is also a Director of Bank of Scotland (Ireland). The sponsorship was short lived.

== Programming ==
=== Current Virgin Media News programmes ===
- Ireland AM bulletins hosted by Anne O'Donnell, Cliódhna Russell and Aisling Roche (Virgin Media One)
- Virgin Media News at 12.30 with Colette Fitzpatrick (Virgin Media One)
- Virgin Media News at 5.30 with Colette Fitzpatrick and Anne O'Donnell (Virgin Media One)
- Virgin Media News at 7.00 with Caroline Twohig (Virgin Media One)
- The Tonight Show with Kieran Cuddihy(Virgin Media One)

=== Former Virgin Media News programmes ===
- Pat Kenny's Big Debate
- TV3 News at 6
- TV3 News at 12
- Agenda (returned after 10 years in Autumn 2016)
- Tonight with Vincent Browne
- Tonight: The People's Debate
- Week in Politics
- The Political Party
- 20/20 (1998–2000) – an Irish edition of the popular U.S. series.
- The Week in Review
- Business Matters
- Midweek
- The Late Review (July 2015- September 2015)
- The Thread
- FYI
- 3e News
- Pat Kenny Tonight
- 3News Update – afternoon news bulletin on 3e
- 3News at 7 on be3 with Claire Brock
- 3News at 10 on be3 with Claire Brock
- News on Two at 22:00 with hosted by Claire Brock

== Additional programming ==
In house news documentaries include Ireland's Crime Capitals, a sensationalist show that observes crime in Ireland; Gift of Life, a three part special focusing on donor donations; Surviving the Recession, a one-off special looking at life in Ireland and the recession.

=== CNN on Virgin Media News ===
CNN, the American cable news channel, often airs on TV3 News when major breaking news stories are taking place, particularly major events in the United States. CNN made its first appearance on TV3 News on 11 September 2001. CNN services have also been availed of during the 2008 election of Barack Obama as President of the United States and the 2009 Death of Michael Jackson. As part of the 2012 United States presidential election, Virgin Media News confirmed that both CNN US and TV3 became media partners in the coverage in Ireland. CNN US reporters will regularly contribute to Virgin Media News programming.

== Former programmes ==
Agenda was a political magazine show hosted by David McWilliams; it ran from 1998 to 2001 on Sunday mornings and repeated in the afternoon. The series returned as part of TV3's Autumn 2016 schedule however it only lasted a further season. The Political Party was a politically themed chat show, hosted by TV3's political editor Ursula Halligan, which originally aired Sundays at 17:00 before being moved to Fridays at 23:00 in late 2008. However the show was axed in March 2009 due to falling advertising revenues at the station. Both shows were produced independently of TV3.

In 2009, TV3 announced a new business show that would effectively replace the original slot held by both Agenda and The Political Party airing every Sunday at midday. The programme was called Business Matters. The series was hosted by Ivan Yates. Business Matters began on 13 September 2009, but just lasted 19 episodes. The series was produced in house by TV3. In 2009, TV3 also started to broadcast the current affairs show Midweek, which airs weekly each Wednesday night and focuses on the latest political and topical issues affecting Ireland.

Midweek was hosted by TV3 News presenter Colette Fitzpatrick. The show began on 16 September 2009. It was a much more tabloid version of other current affairs shows on Irish television dealing with issues such as mail-order brides, alternative medicine, gangland crime, etc. Midweek aired on Wednesdays at 22:00. In July 2014 it was announced that Midweek would not be returning instead it is to be replaced by a special documentaries unit at TV3.

From the station's launch, a 30-minute news bulletin was broadcast at weekends. However, in December 2008, these weekend bulletins were reduced to five minutes, this cut blamed on a downturn in advertising revenues. According to The Sunday Business Post, TV3 had to cut 15 jobs and 15 freelance jobs in the company to save money.

TV3 News aired at the beginning of Midday. As of 2 June 2014 TV3 News no longer airs at the beginning of Midday as the show begins at 11:30.

Friday Late with Vincent Browne appeared in 2011 and was a more relaxed version of the heavy political debate of Tonight with Vincent Browne. After successful ratings of the more easy-going Friday night election specials in the run-up to the 2011 Irish general election, which often featured Marie-Louise O'Donnell as guest, TV3 chose to continue in the same vein with a new spin-off show entitled Friday Late with Vincent Browne, presented from the Ireland AM studio by Vincent Browne, and taking on The Late Late Show, presented by Ryan Tubridy on RTÉ One. Friday Late with Vincent Browne featured guests such as Ray D'Arcy, Linda Martin and Jedward in its first episode. Subsequent episodes featured guests such as David McSavage and Paddy Cole. Browne introduced entrepreneur Norah Casey as "Norah Carey". It was soon discontinued.

3e News broadcast on TV3's sister channel 3e. It was aimed at the 15- to 36-year-old age group. It is presented by Caroline Twohig (News), Paul Walsh (Sport) and Cassie Stokes (Technology). Reports are sourced from the TV3 newsroom, however TV3 state that the news content is entirely different from that of TV3 News at 5:30. 3e News broadcast daily from the TV3 newsroom at 18:00 Monday to Friday.

3e also broadcast regular one-minute news updates. The programme first started broadcasting shortly after TV3 renamed Channel 6 as 3e. The updates last for one minute, and start at 19:00 and broadcast thereafter, every hour, at 20:00, and 21:00. The programme gives viewers a one-minute news summary, with all of the days main news headlines.

3e News was renamed FYI (For Your Information) from 10 March 2010. The show's presenters remain on in their current roles and the format of an interactive news aimed at the 15- to 35-year-old age group remains. It also featured the 'Top 5 Downloads' which are five internet clips at the end of every 18:00 show.

== News team ==
Some Virgin Media News team members include the below. Note, the main and relief news presenters are all female.

- Colette Fitzpatrick – Main news anchor for Virgin Media News at 12:30 and 5.30
- Caroline Twohig– Main news anchor for Virgin Media News at 7
- Anne O’Donnell - Main news anchor Weekend News at 5.30
- Siobhan Bastible - Relief presenter
- Richard Chambers - News Correspondent
- Zara King - Southern News Correspondent
- Gavan Reilly - Political Correspondent
- Deborah Naylor - Courts Correspondent
- Maxine Bramley - Mid-Western Reporter
- Hannah Murphy — News Reporter and Relief presenter
- Aisling Roache — News Reporter and Relief presenter
- Geraldine Lynagh — News Reporter and Relief presenter
- Paul Quinn - News Correspondent
- Mairéad Cleary - News Reporter and Relief presenter
- Nicole Gernon - News Reporter and Relief presenter
- Aisling Ní Choisdealbha - News Reporter
- Ger Treacy - Sports anchor and reporter
- Bernard O'Toole - Sports anchor and reporter
- Ann-Marie Keegan - Sports anchor and reporter
- Will Dalton - Sports anchor and reporter
- Deric Ó hArtagáin - Weather Presenter

== Former news presenters and reporters ==
- Claire Byrne (moved to RTÉ One and RTÉ Radio 1)
- Ray Kennedy (moved to Sky News Ireland, then to RTÉ News)
- Grainne Seoighe (moved to Sky News Ireland, then to RTÉ News)
- Vincent Browne (retired)
- Ursula Halligan (left news broadcasting)
- Michael Ryan
- Rob O'Halloran
- Paul Byrne

== See also ==
- Ireland Live: News bulletins produced by UTV Ireland's news division before the channel became Be3.
