= Timeline of commercial television in the Republic of Ireland =

This is a timeline of the history of commercial television in the Republic of Ireland.

== 1980s and 1990s ==
=== 1988 ===
- October – The Independent Radio and Television Commission is established under the terms of the Radio and Television Act, 1988 to regulate new independent stations in Ireland. and announces that a new television service, TV3, will be established to provide Ireland's third television service.

=== 1990 ===
- The broadcasting licence for the third television service is given to a consortium called Tullamore Beta Ltd. The service will operate via terrestrial television and not, as originally intended, only via MMDS and cable.

=== 1993 ===
- Following the revocation of the licence due to delays in broadcasting the channel, a court battle ensures resulting in the restoration of the licence.
- An agreement is reached to sell 49 per cent of the company to UTV, to raise much-needed cash for investment in facilities.

=== 1995 ===
- UTV pulls out of negotiations to get involved in TV3 after TV3 tried to convince existing MMDS and cable television providers to drop UTV and replace it with TV3. Cable operators choose not to drop UTV Northern Ireland from their line-ups.

=== 1997 ===
- Canadian communications company Canwest buys a major stake in TV3.

=== 1998 ===
- 20 September – Launch of TV3, the Republic of Ireland's first commercial television channel. Early programming on the channel includes the UK soap EastEnders, the miniseries Merlin, the film The Quick and the Dead, US comedy Just Shoot Me, and Breakers, a new Australian soap. The channel is aimed at the 15–44 age group and also has a remit for 15% of its programming to be homegrown – rising to 25% within five years.
- 1 October – Digital satellite television launches in the Republic of Ireland, operated by Sky Digital.
- 1 October – TV3 reports an audience share of 927,000 (7% of viewers) for its first week on air, passing its intended initial target of a 6% audience share.

=== 1999 ===
- 6 May – CableLink, the cable television company which is part owned by RTÉ is sold to NTL Communications for more than £535 million.
- 20 September – On its first anniversary, TV3 launches Ireland AM, the Republic of Ireland's first breakfast television programme.

== 2000s ==
=== 2000 ===
- 11 September – The UK broadcaster Granada Media plc agrees to acquire 45% of TV3 from the channel's original consortium as part of a deal giving TV3 the right to simulcast programming with ITV.

=== 2001 ===
- 1 January – The ITV soap Coronation Street moves from RTÉ 1 to TV3 following Granada plc's purchase of a stake in the commercial broadcaster.
- 5 January – Teachta Dála Michael Ring asks TV3 to consider erecting a transmitter near Belmullet, County Mayo, after being inundated with complaints from viewers unable to watch Coronation Street since its move to TV3, it is reported.
- 11 September – Coverage from CNN, the American cable news channel, is first aired on TV3 News as events from the United States are broadcast around the world following the September 11 attacks. Since 2001 CNN has often aired on TV3 News when major breaking news stories are taking place, particularly in the United States. Subsequent news footage simulcast from CNN include coverage of the 2008 election of Barack Obama as President of the United States and the 2009 Death of Michael Jackson.
- Unknown – Launch of threetext, TV3's teletext service.

=== 2004 ===
- 2 February – The Granada plc share of TV3 is taken over by ITV plc upon the merger of Granada with Carlton.
- 24 May – Sky News Ireland is launched.

=== 2005 ===
- 4 October – The cable television station City Channel Dublin, part of the City Channel network goes on air.

=== 2006 ===
- 16 January – Canwest announces its intention to sell its stake in TV3.
- 6 March – TV3 begins broadcasting in widescreen format on Sky Ireland.
- 30 March – Launch of Channel 6.
- March – Launch of City Channel Galway.
- 23 August – ITV secures a deal to sell its 45% stake in TV3 for £70m.
- 31 October – Sky announces plans to end its nightly Sky News Ireland broadcasts from 30 November.
- 3 November – Ray Kennedy presented the final Sky News Ireland programme at 10.00pm. No further Sky News Ireland bulletins were broadcast after this because the staff walked out.
- 4 December – The UK's Channel 4 becomes available to viewers in Ireland via Sky.
- Unknown – Launch of Setanta Ireland, a channel dedicated to sport, showing both local and international sporting events.

=== 2007 ===
- Unknown – TV3 begins broadcasting in widescreen format on UPC.

=== 2008 ===
- 20 October – TV3 announces that it will axe the Friday broadcast of TV3 Nightly News, moving current affairs programme The Political Party to replace it. The Saturday and Sunday editions of TV3 News at 5:30 will also cut back, with TV3 News at 5:30 being axed from the weekend schedules to be replaced by five-minute news bulletins.
- 10 November – Launch of Channel South, a television channel operated by City Channel, transmitting 24-hour local programming to Cork, Limerick, and parts of Kerry, Waterford, Clare and South Tipperary.

=== 2009 ===
- 5 January – 3e launches, replacing Channel 6.
- January – TV3 relaunches under the corporate name of The TV3 Group, although officially they remain TV3 Television Network Limited. The TV3 Group consists of TV3, 3e and tv3.ie.
- 1 October – The Broadcasting Authority of Ireland takes over as regulator for non-RTE broadcasting in Ireland.

== 2010s ==
=== 2010 ===
- 3 March – TV3 announces that Play TV's contract has been terminated with immediate effect. In their statement they put the removal of the "infomercial" down purely to audience figures rather than the complaints received and upheld by the Broadcasting Authority of Ireland. They do not apologise for their conduct.
- 24 September – TV3 launches its iPhone application.
- 29 October – Launch of Saorview, the national free-to-air digital terrestrial television (DTT) service in the Republic of Ireland. The service operates on a trial basis.

=== 2011 ===
- 26 May – Saorview, the free to air digital television service is launched. The service has eight channels – RTÉ One, RTÉ Two HD, TV3, TG4, RTÉ News Now, 3e, RTÉjr and RTÉ One +1 – and is available to 97% of households in Ireland. Saorview also carries a new digital RTÉ Aertel service and RTÉ's radio services.
- 8 October – TV3's Video on Demand (VOD) is relaunched as 3Player. It replaces the original TV3 Catch-Up service previously available at tv3.ie and through its iPhone/iPad app. The new service was revealed at a press call the previous day1. It is estimated by the TV3 Group that the service will be worth about €7.5 million by 2015. 3Player is in HTML5 format which makes it available on the majority of operating systems.

=== 2012 ===
- 3 May – Launch of Saorsat, Ireland's free-to-air satellite television service. It carries RTÉ One, RTÉ Two HD, RTÉ News Now, RTÉjr, RTÉ One+1 and TG4.
- 10 September – TV3's breakfast television strand Ireland AM is relaunched with a "newsier" format amid speculation that RTÉ is to launch its own breakfast television service later in the year.
- 22 October – TV3 confirms plans to rebrand their 5.30 news bulletin as "The 5.30". The programme moves to a specially designed new virtual set at the station's Ballymount headquarters.
- 24 October – The analogue television service in the Irish Republic is switched off at 10.00am, and is replaced by a second multiplex for Saorview. Saorview is available to 98% of Ireland, but there are problems receiving it in some mountainous areas.
- 25 October – TV3 makes its content available on Roku, an online subscription service that streams content in the United States, Canada and Britain.

=== 2013 ===
- 7 January – Debut of TV3's first self-produced drama, Deception, set on a post-Celtic Tiger housing estate in Galway.
- 5 February – Launch of Irish Horse TV, Ireland's first TV channel dedicated to horse racing and other equine sports.
- 25 February – Telecommunications giant BT, which bought the rights to some Premier League matches in 2012, expands its investment in sports broadcasting with the purchase of ESPN's channels in Britain and Ireland.
- 3 June – AerTV, an Irish-owned online television service launched 18 months previously reports a 130% year-on-year increase in viewership for the first quarter of 2013.
- 5 June – Food manufacturers criticise Broadcasting Authority of Ireland plans to introduce new regulations banning television and radio advertising of foods with high fat, salt, and sugar content during children's programmes.
- 25 June – Setanta Sports signs a deal to make their BT Sport channels and ESPN available in the Irish Republic from 1 August.
- 22 August – TV3 announces plans to commission its first soap opera, and invites companies from Ireland and the UK to put forward ideas.
- 11 September – Aertv launches the first app that enables viewers to receive free streamed content of all Irish broadcast material.

=== 2014 ===
- 27 February – UTV Ireland signs a ten-year contract with BAI to provide a general entertainment channel based in Dublin that will go on air from 2015.
- 1 May – Launch of Irish TV, a free-to-air international channel for the Irish diaspora, broadcasting in Ireland, Europe and the United States.
- 7 May – TV3 confirms its new soap will be set in a police precinct in a fictional harbour town, and has the working title Red Rock. It will employ around 100 people, and is expected to begin airing in January 2015. The series is part of a schedule that will see the channel spending more on home made content than imports for the first time, with it airing up to 100 hours of homegrown content per week.
- 19 June – UTV Ireland unveils its new logo at a press conference in Dublin's Croke Park.
- 16 July – TV3 announces the establishment of a Public Affairs Documentary Unit, and that its Wednesday night current affairs programme Midweek is being axed to make way for programmes produced by the new department. A current affairs series similar to RTÉ's Primetime is also planned for 2015.
- 6 August – Setanta Sports launches its 2014–15 Premier League coverage with an offer to new subscribers to sign up for just €1 a month.
- 29 November – TV3 Group launches its #NewDawn campaign which is part of its rebrand and new schedule for 2015. The campaign kicks off with a 90-second and 60 second TV3 Promo airing at 19:45 on TV3. An advert promoting their newly produced drama series Red Rock is also revealed.
- 1 December – UTV Ireland, due to launch next year, is granted Public Service Status by Minister for Communications, Alex White, TD, allowing it to appear on Saorview.
- 2 December – TV3 launches the timeshift channel TV3 +1 on UPC Ireland Channel 119.

=== 2015 ===
- 1 January – UTV Ireland, the country's first new commercial broadcaster since the launch of TV3 in 1998, goes on air at 7.25pm.
- 5 January – UTV Ireland's national news service, Ireland Live, launches.
- 7 January – New soap Red Rock begins on TV3.
- 30 January – UTV Ireland secures a deal with ITV to show Good Morning Britain after complaints from viewers who had watched the show on UTV via UPC. The programme had been absent from the platform since UTV Ireland's launch.
- 2 February – Good Morning Britain debuts on UTV Ireland, but viewing figures give it an average audience of 2,700, compared to 61,000 for TV3's Ireland AM.
- 26 February – The TV3 Group confirms plans to launch TV3 HD on both UPC Ireland and Sky Ireland in August.
- 24 March – TV3 announces the launch of its new nightly news programme, TV3 News at 8, a 30-minute bulletin showing at 8.00pm, following a similar format to nightly newscasts across Europe. The programme goes on air from Monday 30 March, and will be presented by Colette Fitzpatrick.
- 27 March – TV3 announces the establishment of a strategic distribution partnership with Sky Vision, which will see its content distributed on the international market.
- 8 April – TV3 Group announce that the timeshift channel TV3 +1 is launching on Sky Channel 117 after they agreed a deal with Sky to carry the channel.
- 12 May – TV3 announces it will air the 2015 FA Cup Final on 30 May, bringing the FA Cup back to Irish terrestrial television after a 20-year absence.
- 14 May – UTV Ireland announces it is moving its early evening edition of Ireland Live from 6.30pm to 5.30pm. The channel will also introduce hourly news updates during the day.
- 14 September – UTV Ireland launches a new on-screen branding featuring people such as farmers, tattoo artists and designers with the strapline "YOU TV". UTV hopes the new look will "reinvigorate" the brand.
- 18 September – UTV launches a new version of its UTV Player, allowing viewers to stream live content for the first time.
- 1 December – Shareholders approve the £100 million sale of UTV Media's television business to ITV.
- 7 December –
  - Virgin Media Ireland completes its acquisition of TV3.
  - Eir agrees a deal to buy Setanta Sports
- 22 December – The Broadcasting Authority of Ireland approves ITV's £100 million takeover of UTV plc, meaning the deal has cleared one of the first regulatory hurdles in the Republic.

=== 2016 ===
- 27 June – Children's strand 3Kids launches on 3e.
- 3 July – Irish TV receives approval from Minister for Communications Denis Naughten to launch on the Irish Digital Terrestrial Saorview platform.
- 5 July – Following the purchase of Setanta Sports' Irish operations by Eir, Setanta Ireland is renamed Eir Sport 1 and Setanta Sports 1 is renamed Eir Sport 2.
- 11 July – ITV plc announces that it has sold UTV Ireland to TV3 Group for €10 million. As part of the deal, TV3 Group inherits UTV Ireland's ten-year program supply contract with ITV.
- 22 November – It is announced that Coronation Street and Emmerdale will move from UTV Ireland back to TV3 beginning on 5 December.
- 6 December – It is announced that TV3, along with 3e and its newly purchased channel UTV Ireland, will receive new logos, idents and new schedules.
- 21 December – Irish TV confirms it will cease broadcasting.

=== 2017 ===
- 8 January – UTV Ireland ceases broadcasting.
- 9 January – TV3 Group reveals a new on-air presentation featuring the number 3 superimposed on various natural and urban landscapes across Ireland. A new logo is also revealed along with new promos and on-screen graphics. Similarly, new identities are introduced to 3e and its new station be3.
- 2 February – The Irish Post acquires Irish TV, saving the channel from closure.
- 8 March – Irish TV goes off the air. Its Sky UK slot is subsequently bought by Viacom International Media Networks Europe to launch Spike +1.

=== 2018 ===
- 30 August – TV3 is rebranded as Virgin Media One, while its sister channels 3e and be3 become Virgin Media Two and Three respectively. A fourth pay TV sports channel, Virgin Media Sport, launches on the Virgin Media platform.
- 18 September – Launch of Virgin Media Sport.

=== 2019 ===
- 27 March – Virgin Media announces that its partnership with Sky's AdSmart will to go live in Ireland in the final quarter of the year.

== 2020s ==
=== 2020 ===
- May – Pat Kiely steps down as managing director of Virgin Media Television, and is replaced by Paul Farrell.

=== 2022 ===
- 11 April – Virgin Media Sport closes after four years on air.
- 12 April – Launch of Virgin Media More, a new channel exclusive to Virgin Media customers featuring first look at Irish and international documentaries, films, dramas and sporting events.
- 24 August – Launch of Virgin Media Four.

=== 2023 ===
- 27 April – Virgin Media Four launches on Sky channel 160, and on 159 on Sky Glass.
- 28 July – The media regulator Coimisiún na Meán signs a new ten year national free-to-air Television Programme Service Contract with Virgin Media Television Limited.

== See also ==
- List of television channels available in the Republic of Ireland
- Timeline of RTÉ Television
- Timeline of ITV
- Timeline of Ulster Television
