= List of television channels available in the Republic of Ireland =

This is a list of channels available in Ireland. Public broadcaster Raidió Teilifís Éireann (4 channels), first commercial broadcaster Virgin Media Television (4 channels), Irish language channel TG4, and Irish Parliament Channel Oireachtas TV

== Main channels ==
=== Entertainment channels ===
Channel Name	Owner/parent company
RTÉ One	Raidió Teilifís Éireann
RTÉ One HD	Raidió Teilifís Éireann
RTÉ One +1	Raidió Teilifís Éireann
RTÉ2	Raidió Teilifís Éireann
RTÉ2 HD	Raidió Teilifís Éireann
RTÉ2+1	Raidió Teilifís Éireann
Virgin Media One	Virgin Media Television Ireland
Virgin Media One +1	Virgin Media Television Ireland
Virgin Media One HD	Virgin Media Television Ireland
TG4	Teilifís na Gaeilge
TG4 HD	Teilifís na Gaeilge
Virgin Media Two	Virgin Media Television Ireland
Virgin Media Two HD	Virgin Media Television Ireland
Virgin Media Three	Virgin Media Television Ireland
Virgin Media Three HD	Virgin Media Television Ireland
Virgin Media Four	Virgin Media Television Ireland
Virgin Media Four HD	Virgin Media Television Ireland
Challenge	Sky Ireland

=== Northern Ireland channels ===
Channel Name	Owner/parent company
BBC One Northern Ireland	BBC
BBC One Northern Ireland HD	BBC
BBC Two Northern Ireland	BBC
UTV	ITV plc
UTV +1	ITV plc
UTV HD	ITV plc
Channel 4	Channel Four Television Corporation
Channel 4 +1	Channel Four Television Corporation
Channel 4 HD	Channel Four Television Corporation
5	Channel 5 Broadcasting Ltd (Paramount Networks EMEAA)
5 +1	Channel 5 Broadcasting Ltd (Paramount Networks EMEAA)
5 HD	Channel 5 Broadcasting Ltd (Paramount Networks EMEAA)

=== Children ===
Channel Name	Owner/parent company
RTÉ KIDSjr	Raidió Teilifís Éireann
Cúla4	Teilifís na Gaeilge

=== News ===
Channel Name	Owner/parent company
RTÉ News	Raidió Teilifís Éireann
Oireachtas TV	Oireachtas
Sky News	Sky Ireland

=== Community channels ===
Channel Name	Owner/parent company
Cork Community TV	Cork Community TV Ltd.
P5tv	P5tv Ltd

== Other channels broadcasting to Ireland ==
=== Specialised channels for Ireland ===
These channels show local advertising and/or sponsorship for Ireland.

Channel Name	Owner/parent company
Sky One	Sky Ireland
Sky One +1	Sky Ireland
Sky One HD	Sky Ireland
Sky Witness	Sky Ireland
Sky Witness +1	Sky Ireland
Sky Witness HD	Sky Ireland
Sky Comedy	Sky Ireland
Sky Comedy HD	Sky Ireland
Sky Sports+	Sky Ireland
Sky Sports Football	Sky Ireland
Sky Sports Golf	Sky Ireland
Sky Sports Main Event	Sky Ireland
Sky Sports Main Event HD	Sky Ireland
Sky Sports News	Sky Ireland
Sky Sports News HD	Sky Ireland
Sky Sports Premier League	Sky Ireland
Sky Sports Premier League HD	Sky Ireland
Sky Sports Racing	Sky Ireland
Sky Atlantic	Sky Ireland
Sky Atlantic HD	Sky Ireland
Sky News	Sky Ireland
Sky News HD	Sky Ireland
Sky Mix	Sky Ireland
Sky Kids	Sky Ireland
MTV Ireland	Paramount Skydance
Nickelodeon	Paramount Skydance
Nicktoons	Paramount Skydance
Nick Jr.	Paramount Skydance
Nick Jr. Too	Paramount Skydance
Comedy Central	Paramount Skydance
Comedy Central +1	Paramount Skydance
Comedy Central Extra	Paramount Skydance
Discovery Channel	Discovery Communications Benelux B.V.
TLC	Discovery Communications Benelux B.V.
Animal Planet	Discovery Communications Benelux B.V.
E4	Channel Four Television Corporation
E4 +1	Channel Four Television Corporation

=== Pan-European/international channels ===
Channel Name	Owner/parent company
Euronews	Euronews SA
TV5Monde Europe	TV5MONDE, S.A.
CNN International	Turner Broadcasting System Europe (Time Warner)
Bloomberg Television	Bloomberg L.P.
CNBC Europe	Versant
BBC News (international feed)	BBC
National Geographic	NGC-UK Partnership (National Geographic Society/Fox Networks Group)
National Geographic +1	NGC-UK Partnership (National Geographic Society/Fox Networks Group)
National Geographic HD	NGC-UK Partnership (National Geographic Society/Fox Networks Group)
Nat Geo Wild	NGC-UK Partnership (National Geographic Society/Fox Networks Group)
Nat Geo Wild HD	NGC-UK Partnership (National Geographic Society/Fox Networks Group)
Sky History	A+E Networks UK (A+E Networks/Sky plc)
Sky History +1	A+E Networks UK (A+E Networks/Sky plc)
Sky History HD	A+E Networks UK (A+E Networks/Sky plc)
Crime & Investigation Network	A+E Networks UK (A+E Networks/Sky plc)
Crime & Investigation Network +1	A+E Networks UK (A+E Networks/Sky plc)
Crime & Investigation Network HD	A+E Networks UK (A+E Networks/Sky plc)

=== UK channels available in Ireland ===
Channel Name	Owner/parent company
BBC One London HD	BBC
BBC One HD (Generic UK HD channel)	BBC
BBC Two England HD	BBC
BBC Four	BBC
BBC News (UK feed)	BBC
ITV3	ITV Digital Channels (ITV plc)
ITV4	ITV Digital Channels (ITV plc)
U&Gold	UKTV (BBC Studios)
U&Gold +1	UKTV (BBC Studios)
Sky Arts	Sky plc
Sky Arts HD	Sky plc
Sky Mix	Sky plc
Sky Mix +1	Sky plc
TNT Sports 1	Discovery Networks UK
TNT Sports 1 HD	Discovery Networks UK
TNT Sports 2	Discovery Networks UK

== Proposed and Defunct channels ==
=== Proposed ===
- Atomic TV: A 24-hour music channel was expected to launch in the 1990s.
- Property TV and WTV: both of these channels were proposed to launch in 2008.

=== Unknown dates ===
- Capital Television - this was another short-lived Dublin channel which only broadcast a caption for a week, along with a testcard at night another week. It was a pirate TV channel.

=== 1970s ===
- BCA-TV - Early community channel that broadcast without a licence between 1974 and 1976. The station's offices were located at those of Phoenix Relays.

=== 1980s ===
- Channel 3 - (Later known as Channel D) was a short-lived Dublin based television station broadcasting from July 1981 to November 1981. It was a pirate TV channel.
- Nova TV - this was another Dublin pirate TV channel that was broadcast for a short time in the 1980s.

=== 1990s ===
- RLO TV - this was another legal/pirate television station (Satellite and UHF), broadcast in Limerick by Radio Limerick One in 1999 and 2000. An official licence was granted for the satellite service in 1997 at which time digital broadcasts began making this the first digital television channel in Ireland beating RTÉ by years. During the UHF years while the station was not airing its own content they would broadcast a relay of UK Channel 5.

=== 2000s ===
- Waterford@8 - this was a sister local TV service of WLR FM in Waterford. It was available on cable in Waterford city and Dungarvan and on MMDS in east Waterford and south Kilkenny. The service launched in 2000, and ceased in 2005.
- Sky News Ireland - this was an Irish version of Sky News, carried to Ireland on Sky Digital, and by most cable companies. It ceased broadcasting in November 2006 due to low audience figures.
- Chorus Sports - this was on Chorus Cable, which showed local sports, greyhound racing, and national motor racing events. This ceased broadcasting in January 2007.
- Bubble Hits Ireland - this was a 24-hour music channel targeting both Ireland and the rest of Europe (European version). On 13 February 2009, Bubble Hits ceased broadcasting due to a downturn in advertising revenue.
- Channel 6 - active from 2006 to January 2009; replaced by 3e.

=== 2010s ===
- In December 2016, Irish TV confirmed it would cease broadcasting.
- On 8 January 2017, UTV Ireland ceased broadcasting.
- MTV Music’s Irish feed ceased in July 2019 and was replaced by its British counterpart.

=== 2020s ===
- Channels operated by Sky, BBC, Paramount Global, Warner Media and Discovery are registered to broadcast in Ireland as they are registered in Luxembourg, the Netherlands and the Czech Republic, from 1 January 2021. Previously the Irish feeds of these channels were regulated by the UK regulator OFCOM.
- In late 2021, Eir dropped its Eir Sport channels.
- On 11 April 2022, Virgin Media Sport closed.
- Virgin Media More closed down in November 2025.

== See also ==
- Television in the Republic of Ireland
- Timeline of commercial television in the Republic of Ireland
