= List of HD channels in Ireland =

This is a list of current high definition channels that are available in Ireland, those coming in the future and those that have ceased broadcasting.

All HD channels in Ireland broadcast at 1080i.

There are currently two channels available to Saorsat viewers, three channels available to Saorview viewers, one-hundred-and-five channels available to Sky Ireland viewers and seventy-six channels available to Virgin Media Ireland viewers on their respective EPGs.

== HD channels ==
Channel name	Content	Type	Owner/parent company	Launch date
Al Jazeera English HD	HD/upscaled SD mix	Simulcast	Al Jazeera Media Network	2016/11/03
Arirang TV HD	100% HD	Independent	Korea International Broadcasting Foundation	2016/09/26
BBC One Northern Ireland HD	HD/upscaled SD mix	Simulcast	BBC Northern Ireland	2012/10/24
BBC Two Northern Ireland HD	HD/upscaled SD mix	Simulcast	BBC Northern Ireland	2023/01/05
BBC Three HD	HD/upscaled SD mix	Simulcast	BBC	2022/05/17
BBC Four HD	HD/upscaled SD mix	Simulcast	BBC	2013/12/10
Bloomberg HD	HD/upscaled SD mix	Simulcast	Bloomberg L.P.	2017/03/01
Cartoon Network HD	HD/upscaled SD mix	Simulcast	Turner Broadcasting System Europe (Warner Bros. Discovery)	2011/09/14
CBBC HD	HD/upscaled SD mix	Simulcast	BBC	2013/12/10
CBeebies HD	HD/upscaled SD mix	Simulcast	BBC	2013/12/10
CNBC Europe HD	HD/upscaled SD mix	Simulcast	NBCUniversal	2019/03/01
Channel 4 HD	HD/upscaled SD mix	Simulcast	Channel Four Television Corporation	2012/03/28
CNN International HD	HD/upscaled SD mix	Simulcast	Turner Broadcasting System Europe (Warner Bros. Discovery)	2016/06/28
Colors HD	HD/upscaled SD mix	Simulcast	Viacom 18	2017/02/14
Comedy Central HD	HD/upscaled SD mix	Simulcast	Paramount UK Partnership (Paramount British Pictures/Sky)	2010/08/09
Crime + Investigation HD	HD/upscaled SD mix	Simulcast	A+E Networks UK (A+E Networks/Sky)	2008/11/05
Cúla4 HD	HD/upscaled SD mix	Simulcast	Teilifís na Gaeilge	2023/09/08
Daystar HD	HD/upscaled SD mix	Independent	Daystar Television Network	2015/11/23
Discovery HD	HD/upscaled SD mix	Simulcast	Discovery EMEA (Warner Bros. Discovery)	2006/05/22
Disney+ Cinema HD	HD/upscaled SD mix	Independent	Disney Branded Television	2026/03/17
Disney Jr. HD	HD/upscaled SD mix	Independent	Disney Branded Television	2025/11/13
E4 HD	HD/upscaled SD mix	Simulcast	Channel Four Television Corporation	2009/12/14
Film4 HD	HD/upscaled SD mix	Simulcast	Channel Four Television Corporation	2013/09/02
France 24 HD	HD/upscaled SD mix	Simulcast	France Médias Monde	2018/06/28
GB News HD	HD/upscaled SD mix	Independent	All Perspectives Ltd	2021/06/13
Gemporia HD	HD/upscaled SD mix	Independent	Gemporia Ltd	2025/09/25
HobbyMaker HD	HD/upscaled SD mix	Simulcast	Gemporia Craft	2023/10/30
Ideal World HD	HD/upscaled SD mix	Simulcast	Ideal World	2024/06/24
ITV3 HD	HD/upscaled SD mix	Simulcast	ITV plc	2026/11/00
ITV4 HD	HD/upscaled SD mix	Simulcast	ITV plc	2026/11/00
LFCTV HD	HD/upscaled SD mix	Independent	Liverpool F.C.	2014/11/04
More4 HD	HD/upscaled SD mix	Simulcast	Channel Four Television Corporation	2013/02/04
MTA1 World HD	HD/upscaled SD mix	Simulcast	MTA International	2022/10/27
MTV HD	HD/upscaled SD mix	Simulcast	Paramount Networks UK & Australia	2012/02/13
MUTV HD	HD/upscaled SD mix	Simulcast	Manchester United F.C.	2014/07/14
National Geographic HD	HD/upscaled SD mix	Simulcast	NGC-UK Partnership (National Geographic Society/Disney Channels Worldwide)	2006/05/22
Nat Geo Wild HD	HD/upscaled SD mix	Simulcast	NGC-UK Partnership (National Geographic Society/Disney Channels Worldwide)	2009/04/01
NHK World HD	100% HD	Independent	NHK	2011/05/09
Nick Jr. HD	HD/upscaled SD mix	Simulcast	Nickelodeon UK (Paramount Networks UK & Australia/Sky)	2016/07/05
Nickelodeon HD	HD/upscaled SD mix	Simulcast	Nickelodeon UK (Paramount Networks UK & Australia/Sky)	2010/10/05
PCNE Chinese HD	HD/upscaled SD mix	Simulcast	Phoenix Television	2021/09/30
Premier Sports 1 HD	HD/upscaled SD mix	Independent	Premier Media Broadcasting Ltd	2019/08/01
Premier Sports 2 HD	HD/upscaled SD mix	Independent	Premier Media Broadcasting Ltd	2019/08/01
Quest HD	HD/upscaled SD mix	Simulcast	Discovery EMEA (Warner Bros. Discovery)	2018/08/03
QVC HD	HD/upscaled SD mix	Simulcast	QVC UK	2022/04/04
QVC Style HD	HD/upscaled SD mix	Simulcast	QVC UK	2022/04/04
Racing TV HD	HD/upscaled SD mix	Simulcast	Racing UK Ltd	2016/03/07
RTÉ One HD	HD/upscaled SD mix	Simulcast	Raidió Teilifís Éireann	2013/12/16
RTÉ2 HD	HD/upscaled SD mix	Simulcast	Raidió Teilifís Éireann	2011/05/26
Sky Atlantic HD	HD/upscaled SD mix	Simulcast	Sky	2011/02/01
Sky Arts HD	HD/upscaled SD mix	Simulcast	Sky	2006/05/22
Sky Cinema Action HD	100% HD (Note: Sky Cinema channels are mainly HD, however there is the occasional upscaled SD broadcast where a HD source is not available)	Simulcast	Sky	2008/10/08
Sky Cinema Comedy HD	100% HD	Simulcast	Sky	2008/10/15
Sky Cinema Drama HD	100% HD	Simulcast	Sky	2008/10/08
Sky Cinema Family HD	100% HD	Simulcast	Sky	2008/10/15
Sky Cinema Greats HD	100% HD	Simulcast	Sky	2008/10/08
Sky Cinema Hits HD	100% HD	Simulcast	Sky	2006/05/22
Sky Cinema Premiere HD	100% HD	Simulcast	Sky	2008/03/20
Sky Cinema Sci Fi & Horror HD	100% HD	Simulcast	Sky	2008/10/15
Sky Cinema Select HD	100% HD	Simulcast	Sky	2009/10/26
Sky Cinema Thriller HD	100% HD	Simulcast	Sky	2006/05/22
Sky Comedy HD	HD/upscaled SD mix	Simulcast	Sky	2020/01/27
Sky Crime HD	HD/upscaled SD mix	Simulcast	Sky	2019/10/01
Sky Documentaries HD	HD/upscaled SD mix	Simulcast	Sky	2020/05/27
Sky History HD	HD/upscaled SD mix	Simulcast	A+E Networks UK (A+E Networks/Sky)	2006/10/26
Sky Kids HD	HD/upscaled SD mix	Independent	Sky	2023/02/13
Sky Mix HD	HD/upscaled SD mix	Simulcast	Sky	2023/10/18
Sky Nature HD	HD/upscaled SD mix	Simulcast	Sky	2020/05/27
Sky News HD	100% HD	Simulcast	Sky	2010/05/06
Sky One HD	HD/upscaled SD mix	Simulcast	Sky	2026/02/24
Sky Sci-Fi HD	HD/upscaled SD mix	Simulcast	Sky	2009/01/26
Sky Sports Action HD	HD/upscaled SD mix	Simulcast	Sky	2017/07/18
Sky Sports Arena HD	HD/upscaled SD mix	Simulcast	Sky	2017/07/18
Sky Sports Box Office HD	100% HD	Simulcast	Sky	2015/04/02
Sky Sports Cricket HD	HD/upscaled SD mix	Simulcast	Sky	2017/07/18
Sky Sports F1 HD	HD/upscaled SD mix	Simulcast	Sky	2012/03/09
Sky Sports Football HD	HD/upscaled SD mix	Simulcast	Sky	2017/07/18
Sky Sports Golf HD	HD/upscaled SD mix	Simulcast	Sky	2017/07/18
Sky Sports Main Event HD	HD/upscaled SD mix	Simulcast	Sky	2017/07/18
Sky Sports Mix HD	HD/upscaled SD mix	Simulcast	Sky	2016/08/24
Sky Sports News HD	100% HD	Simulcast	Sky	2010/08/23
Sky Sports Premier League HD	HD/upscaled SD mix	Simulcast	Sky	2017/07/18
Sky Sports Racing HD	HD/upscaled SD mix	Simulcast	Sky/Arena Racing Company	2019/01/01
Sky Sports Tennis HD	HD/upscaled SD mix	Simulcast	Sky	2024/02/11
Sky Witness HD	HD/upscaled SD mix	Simulcast	Sky	2018/08/06
Sony Entertainment Television HD	HD/upscaled SD mix	Simulcast	Sony Pictures Networks	2017/08/01
Sony Max HD	HD/upscaled SD mix	Simulcast	Sony Pictures Networks	2017/08/01
TG4 HD	HD/upscaled SD mix	Simulcast	Teilifís na Gaeilge	2012/10/02
TG4 +1 HD	HD/upscaled SD mix	Simulcast	Teilifís na Gaeilge	2023/09/08
TJC HD	HD/upscaled SD mix	Simulcast	The Jewellery Channel Ltd	2021/03/15
TLC HD	HD/upscaled SD mix	Simulcast	Discovery EMEA (Warner Bros. Discovery)	2013/04/30
TNT Sports 1 HD	HD/upscaled SD mix	Simulcast	Warner Bros. Discovery Sports Europe	2013/08/01
TNT Sports 2 HD	HD/upscaled SD mix	Simulcast	Warner Bros. Discovery Sports Europe	2013/08/01
TNT Sports 3 HD	HD/upscaled SD mix	Simulcast	Warner Bros. Discovery Sports Europe	2015/08/01
TNT Sports 4 HD	HD/upscaled SD mix	Simulcast	Warner Bros. Discovery Sports Europe	2009/08/03
TNT Sports Box Office HD	100% HD	Independent	Warner Bros. Discovery Sports Europe	2018/04/17
TNT Sports Box Office 2 HD	100% HD	Independent	Warner Bros. Discovery Sports Europe	2019/11/04
TRT World HD	HD/upscaled SD mix	Simulcast	Turkish Radio and Television Corporation	2017/05/02
U&Alibi HD	HD/upscaled SD mix	Simulcast	UKTV (BBC Studios)	2012/07/03
U&Dave HD	HD/upscaled SD mix	Simulcast	UKTV (BBC Studios)	2011/10/10
U&Drama HD	HD/upscaled SD mix	Simulcast	UKTV (BBC Studios)	2026/04/16
U&Gold HD	HD/upscaled SD mix	Simulcast	UKTV (BBC Studios)	2017/10/02
U&W HD	HD/upscaled SD mix	Simulcast	UKTV (BBC Studios)	2011/10/12
U&Yesterday HD	HD/upscaled SD mix	Simulcast	UKTV (BBC Studios)	2022/08/08
Utsav Gold HD	HD/upscaled SD mix	Simulcast	Star India	2017/12/06
Utsav Plus HD	HD/upscaled SD mix	Simulcast	Star India	2012/07/05
Virgin Media One HD	HD/upscaled SD mix	Simulcast	Virgin Media Television	2015/08/11
Virgin Media Two HD	HD/upscaled SD mix	Simulcast	Virgin Media Television	2017/01/09
Virgin Media Three HD	HD/upscaled SD mix	Simulcast	Virgin Media Television	2017/01/09
Virgin Media Four HD	HD/upscaled SD mix	Simulcast	Virgin Media Television	2022/08/24
