= 2016 in Irish television =

The following is a list of events relating to television in Ireland from 2016.

== Events ==
- 17 January – The Sunday Business Post reports that Virgin Media Ireland have plans to launch additional TV3 channels, including a 24-hour rolling news channel. The TV3 Group later denies such reports.
- 20 January – RTÉ announces that it has partnered with Freesat, the UK free-to-air television company, to develop a new product for Saorview, Ireland’s free digital television service and the largest television platform in Ireland.
- 29 February – ITV completes its purchase of UTV Group's television business, which includes UTV Ireland. The remainder of UTV Group operates as radio broadcaster Wireless Group, and is later sold to News UK).
- 24 April – Michael Lawson wins the fifth series of The Voice of Ireland.
- 27 April – Joanne Cantwell becomes the first woman to anchor RTÉ's coverage of the Champions League.
- 27 June – Children's strand 3Kids launches on 3e.
- 3 July – Irish TV has received ministerial approval from Minister for Communications Denis Naughten to launch on the Irish Digital Terrestrial Saorview platform.
- 5 July – Following the purchase of Setanta Sports' Irish operations by Eir, Setanta Ireland is renamed Eir Sport 1 and Setanta Sports 1 is renamed Eir Sport 2.
- 11 July – ITV plc announces that it has sold UTV Ireland to TV3 Group for €10 million. As part of the deal, TV3 Group inherits UTV Ireland's ten-year program supply contract with ITV.
- 3 August – RTÉ announces its intention to replace The Voice of Ireland with an Irish version of Strictly Come Dancing.
- 22 November – It is announced that Coronation Street and Emmerdale will move from UTV Ireland back to TV3 beginning on 5 December.
- 1 December – TV3's The 7 O'Clock Show is moved forward an hour and renamed The 6 O'Clock Show in order to facilitate the return of Emmerdale and Coronation Street to the channel.
- 6 December – It is announced that TV3, along with 3e and its newly purchased channel UTV Ireland, will receive new logos, idents and new schedules.
- 7 December – Nicky Byrne and Amanda Byram are confirmed as the presenters of Dancing with the Stars.
- 17 December – Boxer Conor McGregor is voted the 2016 RTÉ Sports Person of the Year.
- 18 December –
  - RTÉ confirms that Julian Benson, Loraine Barry and Brian Redmond will be the judges on Dancing with the Stars.
  - The Cummins family from County Tipperary, coached by Anna Geary, win season four of Ireland's Fittest Family.
- 21 December – Irish TV confirms it will cease broadcasting.

== Debuts ==
=== RTÉ ===
- 3 January – Rebellion on RTÉ One (2016)
- 1 February – Bridget & Eamon on RTÉ Two (2016–2019)
- 10 February – 1916: The Irish Rebellion. (First part of a 3-part documentary) on RTÉ One.
- 14 March – Hey Duggee on RTÉjr (2014–present)
- 21 April – First Dates on RTÉ Two (2016–present)
- 6 November – Know The Score on RTÉ One (2016)

=== TV3 (Including 3e) ===
- 27 June – Origanimals (2016)
- 22 September – Gogglebox Ireland (2016–present)

=== TG4 ===
- 19 September – Inspector Gadget (2015–2018)

== Ongoing television programmes ==
=== 1960s ===
- RTÉ News: Nine O'Clock (1961–present)
- RTÉ News: Six One (1962–present)
- The Late Late Show (1962–present)

=== 1970s ===
- The Late Late Toy Show (1975–present)
- The Sunday Game (1979–present)

=== 1980s ===
- Fair City (1989–present)
- RTÉ News: One O'Clock (1989–present)

=== 1990s ===
- Would You Believe (1990s–present)
- Winning Streak (1990–present)
- Prime Time (1992–present)
- Nuacht RTÉ (1995–present)
- Nuacht TG4 (1996–present)
- Ros na Rún (1996–present)
- TV3 News (1998–present)
- Ireland AM (1999–present)
- Telly Bingo (1999–present)

=== 2000s ===
- Nationwide (2000–present)
- TV3 News at 5.30 (2001–present) – now known as the 5.30
- Against the Head (2003–present)
- news2day (2003–present)
- Other Voices (2003–present)
- Saturday Night with Miriam (2005–present)
- The Week in Politics (2006–present)
- Tonight with Vincent Browne (2007–2017)
- Xposé (2007–2019)
- At Your Service (2008–present)
- Championship Live (2008–present) – Now rebranded as GAA on 3
- Operation Transformation (2008–present)
- 3e News (2009–present)
- Dragons' Den (2009–present)
- Two Tube (2009–present)

=== 2010s ===
- Jack Taylor (2010–present)
- Love/Hate (2010–present)
- Mrs. Brown's Boys (2011–present)
- The GAA Show (2011–present)
- MasterChef Ireland (2011–present)
- Irish Pictorial Weekly (2012–present)
- Today (2012–present)
- The Works (2012–present)
- Deception (2013–present)
- Celebrity MasterChef Ireland (2013–present)
- Second Captains Live (2013–present)
- Claire Byrne Live (2015–present)
- The Restaurant (2015–present)
- Red Rock (2015–present)
- TV3 News at 8 (2015–present)
- Ireland Live (2015–2017)

== Ending this year ==
- 24 April – The Voice of Ireland (2012–2016)
- 28 October – The Fall (2013–2016)
- 23 December – Midday (2008–2016)
- Unknown date – Republic of Telly (2009–2016) and The Mario Rosenstock Show (2012–2016)

== Deaths ==
- 31 January – Terry Wogan, 77, Irish-British radio and television broadcaster.

== See also ==
- 2016 in Ireland
