= Virgin TV (disambiguation) =

Virgin TV is a pay television service in the UK.

Virgin TV may also refer to:

- Virgin Plus TV, an over-the-top pay television and Internet bundle in Canada
- Virgin Media Ireland, a telecommunications company in Ireland providing Virgin TV pay television
- Virgin Media Television, a broadcasting company in the Republic of Ireland
- Living TV Group, a defunct British broadcasting company formerly known as Virgin Media Television
