= Saorsat =

Irish free-to-air satellite service

- Type: Free-to-air satellite television promotions company
- Industry: Media
- Founded: 3 May 2012; 14 years ago
- Area served: Ireland
- Products: Equipment to receive free-to-air digital satellite television channels
- Website: saorsat.ie

Saorsat (/ˈsɛərsæt/ SAIR-sat; a portmanteau of the Irish word Saor, meaning “free”, and a shortening of the word “satellite”) is a free-to-air satellite service in Ireland. The service launched on 3 May 2012. It was designed to provide TV service to a final 1-2% of the Irish population unable to receive other signals.

The service is due to close in early 2028, when the satellite used to deliver it reaches the end of its life.

== Overview ==
The RTÉ Network Limited (RTÉNL) analogue terrestrial television (ATT) network was never capable of providing 100% population coverage in Ireland. Prior to the digital switchover, ATT population coverage amounted to 98% for RTÉ One and RTÉ Two, 95% for TG4 and 85% for TV3. Saorview DTT faces a similar difficulty.

Broadcasting the channels unencrypted from the Astra 2 satellites at 28° East was not considered an option due to its large footprint covering the UK, France and many other countries. Irish broadcasters acquire rights on the basis that programming is broadcast solely to Irish audiences (i.e. some 4.5 million people) and not to approximately 100 million people within the Astra footprint. The Board of RTÉ approved the Saorsat approach developed by RTÉNL from early 2010 to enable the 1-2% of Irish households not covered by Saorview to access free-to-air digital television services.

RTÉ submitted a revised DTT plan including the FTA satellite option to the Department of Communications in mid-June 2010 for approval. RTÉ publicly announced at an Oireachtas Joint Committee on Communications discussion in mid July 2010 that a free-to-air satellite service, called Saorsat, would be offered to complement the terrestrial DTT service.

The satellite option is a narrow-band satellite operating in the Ka band as opposed to the normal DTH Ku band (which Sky and Freesat use), with a spot beam being dedicated exclusively to Ireland which will also provide coverage throughout Northern Ireland. The spot beam with frequency reuse means reception in most of Britain and continental Europe is not possible. RTÉ states that the chosen satellite option will cost approximately €1.5 million per year. RTÉ said that the combined offering was designed to be the most cost-effective solution for viewers and broadcasters, to offer for the first time 100% coverage of free-to-air public service television services in the Republic of Ireland and to provide full national back-up coverage on satellite in the event of an emergency or catastrophic failure of the DTT system.

Approval for the revised National DTT plan and Saorsat satellite service was announced by the Minister for Communications at the end of July 2010. RTÉ did not confirm that Saorsat would broadcast from KA-SAT until February 2012. There is no other current satellite solution with a spot covering only Ireland. Strictly speaking the spot covers a large part of Wales, South West England and the Hebrides of Scotland, but the frequency and polarisation reuse scheme means that no matter how big a dish is used, interference from a similar spot over northern France would prevent reception much beyond terrestrial overspill into Wales. Reception over all of Northern Ireland may be possible.

At least a Ka band LNB, dish and DVB-S2 receiver will be required to receive Saorsat. Reception of Sky or Freesat from the Astra 2 satellites at 28° East will require a separate feed and a DiSEqC or Multiswitch with a Diseqc compatible receiver. 2rn state that a dish of 1 metre (39 in) diameter is required for reception of Saorsat on the island of Ireland.

Saorview is really the RTÉ NL name for the public service broadcaster multiplexes. According to the RTÉ submission to Oireachtas committee the proposed RTÉ NL operated Saorsat is expected to be a copy of Saorview. As of 28 May 2011 the test loop used the same total bitrate as the terrestrial DTT mux. A dual feed dish (with Ku and Ka LNBFs) or a separate second boxed Cassegrain "dish" is required with a Diseqc switch and HD DVB-S2 tuner to have Freesat and Saorsat on the same set-box or IDTV receiver.

RTÉ has made it clear that Saorview/Saorsat will not carry television services from outside the Republic of Ireland and that people in Ireland should seek other digital services to view additional channels other than what is offered. In contrast, the Irish government has already signed an agreement to permit retransmission of BBC channels.

Testing started in May 2011 on KA-SAT 9E, 20.185 GHz DVB-S2 SR25000 FEC 1/2 with pre-recorded material.

== Technical ==
The parameters are:

- Ka-Sat 9A @ 9°E
- 20192 MHz, Left Circular Polarisation
- DVB-S2 QPSK
- 12500 Symbol rate
- 5/6 FEC
- Irish spot (there are 83 spots on Ka-Sat)

It is likely a second carrier will be used to carry material on the second Terrestrial PSB mux. The second DTT mux is running with no services on many sites and there is a second DVB-S2 carrier in the same part of the Ku band for Internet Services using SR 50000 with adaptive modulation and FEC.

Any DVB-S2 HD satellite receiver can in theory be used to receive Saorsat as the Ka band LNBF converts to a regular IF in the 950 MHz to 2,100 MHz band. If the receiver does not have a setting for the Ka band LNBF Lo, then a "fake" frequency 10.765 vertical rather than the real 20.185 may be entered when using the Inverto LNB with local oscillator of 21.2.

To receive Freesat/Sky or other services alongside Saorsat, a dual- or multi-feed type dish or two dishes are needed with either one or more DiSEqC switches or a multi-switch. On a multi-switch the Saorsat LNB needs to be connected to vertical 0 kHz port only. The other 3 input ports are left unused.

Even with the narrow beam, reception is available in the western parts of Scotland, England and Wales with an LNBF on an 80 cm (31 in) dish pointed at Eutelsat 9E.

== Channels ==
=== Television ===
Saorsat only broadcasts channels from public broadcasters (7 TV and all radio services from RTÉ + Oireachtas TV and TG4). Virgin Media One, Virgin Media Two, Virgin Media Three, Virgin Media Four, Challenge TV, Sky News, UCB Ireland and Radio Maria Ireland which are available on Saorview are not broadcast on Saorsat.

Saorsat channels may be sorted in various ways depending on device as it does not use LCNs. Therefore, the service IDs are listed instead.

SID	Channel name	Notes	Broadcast Hours	Resolution
5101	RTÉ One	Full-time	24 hours	HD (1080i)
5102	RTÉ2	Full-time	24 hours	HD (1080i)
5103	RTÉ News	Rolling news (live content & repeats)	24 hours	SD (576i)
5104	TG4	Irish-language	24 hours	SD (576i)
5107	RTÉ KIDSjr	Children's	07:00 - 19:00	SD (576i)
5108	Cúla4	Children's	06:00 - 20:00	SD (576i)
5109	Oireachtas TV	Oireachtas and European Parliament proceedings	Mon-Fri: 09:00 - 00:00 (Times vary slightly, depending on schedule)	SD (576i)
5111	RTÉ One +1	Timeshift of RTÉ One	24 hours	SD (576i)
5112	RTÉ2 +1	Timeshift of RTÉ2	Mon-Fri: 19:00 - 02:30; Sat-Sun: 12:00 - 02:30 (Times vary slightly, depending on schedule)	SD (576i)

SIDs 5106, 5119 and 5120 are test services which may not be visible on some receivers.

=== Radio ===
SID	Channel name	Broadcast Hours
5226	RTÉ Radio 1	24 hours
5227	RTÉ 2FM	24 hours
5228	RTÉ lyric fm	24 hours
5229	RTÉ Raidió na Gaeltachta	24 hours
5234	RTÉ Gold	24 hours

== See also ==
- Television in the Republic of Ireland
- RTÉ Network Limited
- Saorview
