= Eir Sport =

Irish television channel group

Ownership
- Owner: Eir

History
- Former names: Setanta Sports (2007-2016)

Links
- Website: www.eirsport.ie

Eir Sport (stylised as eir Sport; formerly Setanta Sports) was a group of Irish television sports channels operated by Eircom Sport Limited, a subsidiary of Eir. In December 2015, Eir purchased original Setanta Sports operations in the Republic of Ireland, which the company rebranded as Eir Sport on 5 July 2016.

== History ==
Setanta Sports logo used from 2007 to 2016.

In the wake of the financial difficulties of Setanta GB, it was reported in June 2009 by RTÉ News that the original Setanta Sports channel, Setanta Ireland, might be bought out by an existing consortium who already hold interests in Setanta Sport Holdings Ltd., the Irish arm of Setanta Sports. Setanta Sports Ireland and Setanta Sports North America were the only brands which made a profit in 2008.

In July 2009, the ownership structure of Setanta Sports Channel Ireland Limited (previously Setanta Sports Ireland Ltd) changed. Setanta Sports Channel Ireland Limited was co-owned by Gaiety Investments (60% share) with the remaining 40% share made up by Danu Partners Limited. The main shareholders in Danu are Michael O'Rourke, Leonard Ryan, and Mark O'Meara. Danu purchased 100% of the shares in Setanta Sports North America Limited which was disposed of in early 2010. Setanta Sports Channel Ireland Limited is licensed by the Broadcasting Authority of Ireland.

The Setanta business in Ireland has managed to survive, making a strong recovery since the adversity in Great Britain. The company continued its resurrection by employing a further 50 employees in February 2010. Colin Morgan, formerly CEO of Quinn Direct Insurance, joined the Setanta Ireland business in October 2010.

In June 2013 it was announced that Setanta Sports would carry the new BT Sport channels as part of its overall sports package for Irish viewers. The deal added 38 live Premier League games to its television package and brought to 71 the total number of top-flight English matches on offer to Irish subscribers for the following three years.

In 2015, it was announced that Eir were in the process of buying Setanta's remaining Irish operations (Setanta Ireland and Setanta Sports 1). The deal also included the sale of the Setanta Sports Pack which includes BT Sport. On 5 July 2016, Setanta Sports was renamed Eir Sport.

In May 2021, it was announced that eir Sport would cease operations by the end of 2021.

== Channels ==
- Eir Sport 1 – formerly Setanta Ireland (Ceased broadcasting on 28 October 2021)
- Eir Sport 2 – formerly Setanta Sports 1 (Ceased broadcasting on 20 July 2021)
- Eir Sport X1 – only available on Eir TV (Ceased broadcasting on 20 July 2021)
- Eir Sport X2 – only available on Eir TV (Ceased broadcasting on 20 July 2021)
- Eir Sport UHD – only available on Eir TV (Ceased broadcasting on 20 July 2021)

In addition to the television channels above, Eir Sport also distributed the following BT Sport channels in the Republic of Ireland: BT Sport 1, BT Sport 2, BT Sport 3 and BT Sport 4

== Sports coverage ==
Eir Sport offered sports from several countries around the world programming of sports such as football, gaelic football, hurling, golf, cricket, Australian rules football, boxing, NHL ice hockey and rugby union and league.

In May 2018, it was announced that Eir Sport would broadcast all 152 games in the Pro14 rugby union competition from the 2018–19 season after agreeing a three-year deal.

== Availability ==
Eir Sport services are included in the cost of the Eir Sport package on Eir Broadband. Eir Sport services are also available through Sky Ireland, Eir TV and Vodafone TV.

The channels were previously available to the customers of what is now Virgin Media Ireland. In February 2010, the Setanta Ireland channel was available to entire subscribers of the cable TV provider as a basic channel in Ireland. From August 2016, Virgin Media Ireland no longer has Eir Sport (and BT Sport) channels available to customers.

== High definition ==
Setanta Sports launched Ireland's first high-definition channel. The channel was announced in September 2010, and later launched as Setanta HD February 2011, exclusively on UPC Ireland. The Dublin v Armagh Gaelic football encounter on 5 February 2011 was Ireland's first broadcast of Gaelic games in high definition.
