= Sky Digital =

Sky Digital may refer to brands of the following:

- Sky UK
- Sky Ireland
- Sky (New Zealand)

== See also ==
- Sky Group
