= Cork Community TV =

Television channel in Ireland

Cork Community Television
- Country: Ireland
- Broadcast area: Dublin, Limerick, Cork, Galway and Waterford
- Headquarters: Cork Community Television Ltd, Faraday Court, Old Blackrock Road, Cork, Ireland

Ownership
- Owner: Company Limited by Guarantee (without share capital)

History
- Launched: 28 May 2009

Links
- Website: www.corkcommunitytv.ie

Cork Community Television (CCTv) is a community access television station on Virgin Media Ireland channel 803, broadcasting programmes made by, about and for Cork communities.

== History ==
It launched on 28 May 2009, with the intention to "broadcast for one to two hours daily" in its first year of operation.

Cork Community TV assists members and member organisations to secure funding from the Sound and Vision "Community in a Studio" fund, which is generated from the TV licence fee and administered by the Broadcasting Commission of Ireland (BCI). The Sound and Vision fund is a grant scheme designed to support the production of new television and radio programmes in the areas of Irish culture, heritage and experience and adult literacy.

Cork Community Television (CCTv) was established as a Company Limited by Guarantee (without share capital) in May 2007.
