= Eir Sport 1 =

- Country: Ireland
- Broadcast area: Ireland; Northern Ireland

Programming
- Picture format: 1080i HDTV (downscaled to 16:9 576i for the SDTV feed)

Ownership
- Owner: Eir

History
- Launched: August 2004
- Closed: 30 June 2021; 5 years ago (Northern Ireland); 28 October 2021 (Ireland)
- Replaced by: Premier Sports
- Former names: Setanta Sports Ireland; Setanta Ireland

Links
- Website: www.eirsport.ie

Eir Sport 1 (formerly Setanta Ireland) was an Irish pay television sports channel featuring local and international sporting events. The channel is available on some basic cable packages in Ireland, while it is available upon direct subscription to the Eir Sport package on other networks across Ireland. Its former sister channel is the subscription based network Eir Sport 2.

In June 2013, Setanta Sports signed a long-term agreement with BT Sport to distribute these channels within the Republic of Ireland. In November 2015, Irish telecommunications company Eir acquired Setanta Sports. On 5 July 2016, Setanta Ireland was renamed Eir Sport 1.

On 15 August 2019, eir Sport and Virgin Media Sport contracted a deal to show Virgin Media Sport on eir Vision and eir Sport 1 on Virgin Media Ireland. On 13 August 2020, eir Sport 1 was removed from Virgin Media Ireland, as eir refused to pay the contracted distribution license fee.

== History ==
- Setanta Sports was formed in 1990 to facilitate the broadcasting of Irish sporting events to Irish expatriates
- The Setanta Ireland channel launched in August 2004 as a free bonus channel on the UPC platform (previously Cablelink, then ntl) in the Republic of Ireland. It was also immediately available as a pay TV channel on Sky Ireland, and was followed by the establishment of a full network of sports channels in the UK.
- On 5 July 2016 the Setanta Sports brand was replaced in Ireland by EirSport, following the sale of Setanta's irish channels to Eir.
- Setanta Ireland's CEO is Michael O'Rourke, who was one of the original company founders. He took over following the departure of Colin Morgan in late 2012. Niall Cogley was the CEO prior to that.
- The company's production headquarters is in Broadcasting House, Princes Street South, Dublin 2, Ireland.
- Senior positions include Brendan Higgins CFO, Brian Quinn Marketing Director, Trevor Twamley Advertising Sales Director, Graham Byrne Head of commercial premises
- The name 'Setanta', comes from the name of the ancient Irish Warrior 'Setanta' from Ulster who frequently played the oldest known field sport, hurling, and who was later given the name 'Cúchulainn' as described in the ancient Irish texts of the 'Annals of Ulster'
- Setanta acquired the Premier League highlights rights for the Republic of Ireland in August 2013, taking over from RTÉ. In July 2016, it was announced that they had lost these rights to Sky Sports Ireland with effect from the 2016/17 Premier League season.

=== Closure ===
Eir announced on 19 May 2021 that all of their sports channels would close before the end of the year. Eir Sport 1 shut down in Northern Ireland on the 30 June and so did X1 and X2. Eir Sport 2 closed on 20 July. Eir Sport 1 closed on 28 October, marking an end to the Eir Sport channels.

== Programming ==
In Ireland, Eir Sport 1 broadcast League of Ireland, Setanta Sports Cup, Premier League (ROI only), Allianz Leagues GAA, F1, The Masters, The Open Championship, Europa League, Champions League, Roland Garros, Live Horseracing and Golf Channel programming.

For a brief period from June 2011, Setanta Ireland experimented with music programming and Irish films as part of its line-up.

In 2012 Setanta had the Irish rights to cover all of Liverpool's home games live in the 2012–13 UEFA Europa League group stage.

In August 2013, Setanta Ireland started showing Premier League Highlights for the first time. The new show Premier League Central took over from RTÉ who had previously held the rights. The show goes out on Saturday and Sunday nights and is hosted by Connor Morris.

In June 2013, Setanta Ireland added the newly formed UK sports broadcaster BT Sport to its platform for Republic of Ireland sports fans. This resulted in the Setanta Sports pack in the ROI containing six channels; Setanta Ireland, Setanta 1, BT Sport 1, BT Sport 2, BT Sport Europe & ESPN. All programming available on the Eir Sport pack can found below.

Football

- Republic of Ireland women's national football team
- Republic of Ireland national under-21 football team
- (Republic of Ireland) League of Ireland
- (Republic of Ireland) (Northern Ireland) Setanta Sports Cup
- (Republic of Ireland) League of Ireland Cup
- (Europe) Magazine shows including Champions League Magazine, Serie A highlights, Ligue 1 Highlights and Goalissimo
- (Europe) Pre-Season friendlies featuring Premier League Teams
- (England) Classic Premier League
- Copa América
- Copa Libertadores
- Copa Sudamericana

Golf

- Masters Tournament
- Open Championship
- Royal Trophy live from Asia – 3 days in December
- Golf Channel Content including the Feherty show, Big Break Ireland and Being John Daly
- Golf Central from Golf Channel

Rugby

- Irish Schools Rugby
- Six Nations - highlights
- National Rugby League
- In Touch – weekly rugby highlights

North American sports

- NFL
- NBA
- NHL
- NCCA football & basketball
- NHL Tonight – Magazine show
- NASCAR

Horseracing

- Over 50 days of live racing from various UK meetings
- Mark your card – weekly horse racing show

Tennis

- Roland Garros
- Wimbledon

Other

- Paralympics 2012 & 2016
- World Rally Championship - Rally Preview and Highlights
- Sundry MMA events including cage contender
- Boxing Magazine shows
- Sundry Athletic Shows including the Great North Run
- Irish Sports Documentaries commissioned for Setanta
- European Games

GAA

- (Republic of Ireland) Allianz Leagues - live
- (Republic of Ireland) GAA Championship - deferred coverage
- (Republic of Ireland) GAA Club Championship - live

== Ownership ==
see Eir Sport.

== Eir Sport 1 HD ==
Eir Sport 1 HD is a high definition simulcast of Eir Sport 1. The channel was the first ever Irish owned HD channel in the Republic of Ireland. It launched on 23 November 2010 then known as Setanta HD.

The former company Setanta had previously hoped to have a high-definition channel launched by August 2008, in time for the 2008–09 Premier League season.

Former logo Setanta HD Logo 2010-2016

=== Other programming ===
Setanta's major in-house programme was The Sports Show (formerly The Hub) which aired sports highlights and news three times daily across 2009 and 2010. A previous version of the programme called The Hub ran from 2005-09. Setanta also simulcast the radio show Off The Ball from Newstalk.

== Setanta Sports Cup ==
Setanta was the sponsor of the Setanta Sports Cup, an annual soccer tournament which featured teams from the League of Ireland and Irish Football League from 2005-14.

== Availability ==
As of 5 July 2016 in the Republic of Ireland, the Eir Sport Package is available for free to any Eir broadband customer. This includes the BT Sport package. Additionally, since 1 August 2016, the Eir Sport Package is available on Eir TV, Sky Ireland and Vodafone TV. Eir Sport offers commercial venues in Ireland programming of sports such as football (soccer), Gaelic football, hurling, golf, cricket, rugby union and rugby league and boxing.

=== BT Sport deal ===
On 24 June 2013, Eir Sport (previously Setanta Sports) announced that it had struck a 3-year deal with BT Sport to carry the BT Sport 1, BT Sport 2 and ESPN channels as part of the Setanta pack in the Republic of Ireland. The HD feeds of these channels are also available at no extra cost. In September 2015, BT Sport Europe was added to the pack. BT Sport Europe was introduced to broadcast the BT Sport's live UEFA Champions League and UEFA Europa League matches. The deal ran until 2019, when Sky TV took over BT's distribution rights in Ireland, bundling BT's channels with that of Premier Sports to produce the Sky Sports Extra bundle, only available in Ireland.

=== Closure ===
Eir announced on 19 May 2021 that eir Sport 1 would close before the end of 2021. Eir also announced that eir Sport 2 will close on 20 July 2021.

== See also ==
- Eir Sport
- Eir Sport 2
