= Eir Sport 2 =

- Country: Ireland
- Broadcast area: Ireland; Northern Ireland

Programming
- Picture format: 1080i HDTV (downscaled to 16:9 576i for the SDTV feed)

Ownership
- Owner: Eir
- Sister channels: Eir Sport 1, Eir Sport X1, Eir Sport X2, Eir Sport UHD

History
- Launched: 2004 (as Setanta Sports 1)
- Closed: 20 July 2021; 5 years ago
- Replaced by: FreeSports HD (Sky Ireland only)
- Former names: Setanta Sports 1 (2004–2016)

Links
- Website: www.Eirsport.ie

Eir Sport 2 (stylised as eir Sport 2, formerly Setanta Sports 1) was an Irish pay television channel owned by Setanta Sports Channel Ireland.

The channel carried coverage of association football (including top-flight European leagues and UEFA Europa League), boxing, golf, motorsport, and coverage of the SSE Airtricity League.

On 16 December 2013 Setanta Sports launched a high-definition of Setanta Sports 1. Setanta Sports 1 HD was first exclusively available through Virgin Media Ireland, but later launched on Sky on 20 July 2015, along with Premier Sports HD.

On 15 August 2019, Eir Sport and Virgin Media Sport contracted a deal to show Virgin Media Sport on Eir Vision and Eir Sport 1 on Virgin Media Ireland.

As per eir's announcement on 19 May 2021, Eir Sport 2 closed on 20 July 2021. Eir also announced that Eir Sport 1 will also close before the end of 2021.

== Broadcast rights ==
Most of these aired on both Setanta Ireland and Setanta Sports 1 and were shared between the two channels. In some instances (largely football coverage) Setanta only possessed Republic of Ireland rights, during such programming the channel is unavailable in Northern Ireland. Conversely, live coverage of GAA Championship matches was available only in Northern Ireland and not the Republic.

=== Club football ===
- UEFA Champions League
- UEFA Europa League
- FA Cup (Republic of Ireland only)
- League of Ireland
- Setanta Sports Cup

=== International football ===
- Copa América
- Friendly matches, typically on a once-off basis

=== Gaelic Athletic Association ===
- GAA Football National League
- GAA Hurling National League
- All-Ireland Senior Hurling Championship (Live coverage in Northern Ireland, Deferred (not same day) in the Republic of Ireland)
- All-Ireland Senior Football Championship (Live coverage in Northern Ireland, Deferred (not same day) in the Republic of Ireland)

=== Rugby Union ===
- IRB Rugby World Cup
- Pro14 (Deferred/highlights only from September 2010 onwards)
- Exclusive rights to the highlights of the RBS 6 Nations
- Certain international rugby union Test games on a one-off basis
- IRB Sevens

=== Rugby League ===
- Rugby League World Cup
- National Rugby League

=== Other programming ===
Setanta's major in-house programme was The Sports Show (formerly The Hub) which aired daily. It also simulcasted the radio show Off The Ball from Newstalk.

== Setanta Sports Cup ==
Setanta was the sponsor of the Setanta Sports Cup, an annual soccer tournament which featured teams from the League of Ireland and Irish Football League.

== Availability ==
As of July 2016 in the Republic of Ireland, the Eir Sport Package was available for free to any Eir broadband customer. This included the BT Sport package. Additionally the Eir Sport Package was available on Eir TV, Virgin Media Ireland, Sky Ireland and Vodafone TV. Eir Sport offered commercial venues in Ireland programming of sports such as football (soccer), Gaelic football, hurling, golf, cricket, rugby union and rugby league and boxing.

On 12 September 2019, Eir Sport 2 was removed from Sky in Ireland and was replaced by Virgin Media Sport. On 13 August 2020, Virgin Media Sport's feeds on Eir and Sky Ireland that were provided by Eir were replaced by Eir Sport 2 on those platforms, as Eir refused to pay the contracted distribution license fee.
