= Orla Ní Fhinneadha =

Irish teacher, singer and weather presenter

- Occupations: Television presenter, singer, teacher

Orla Ní Fhinneadha is an Irish singer, teacher, television presenter and former child actor. A gaeilgeoir, she has been a weather presenter and teacher on the Irish-language station TG4. She is an accomplished sean-nós singer. She was one of the presenters of Cúla4 ar Scoil, a television series broadcasting primary school lessons to children who could not attend school due to COVID related lockdowns.

== Background ==
Ní Fhinneadha attended Scoil Náisiúnta Cholmcille in Tully, County Galway, and Coláiste Cholmcille in Inverin. She was a contestant in the County Galway section of the Rose of Tralee competition.

== Career ==
Ní Fhinneadha qualified as a teacher.

She presented the New Year's Eve countdown show Fáilte 2022 with Dáithí Ó Sé.
