= Virgin Media Play =

Irish television streaming service

- Original author: Virgin Media Television
- Developer: Virgin Media Television
- Initial release: 8 October 2011; 14 years ago (as 3Player); 30 August 2018; 7 years ago (as Virgin Media Player); 2 September 2024; 16 months ago (as Virgin Media Play)
- Operating system: Windows 10 Windows 11, macOS, Linux, iOS, Android
- Predecessor: 3Player
- Available in: English
- Type: Live streaming Video on demand
- Website: play.virginmediatelevision.ie

Virgin Media Play (formerly 3Player, then Virgin Media Player) is a live streaming and on demand video service available in Ireland, provided by Virgin Media Television (formerly TV3 Group), a subsidiary of Virgin Media Ireland, for programmes broadcast on the company's television channels (Virgin Media One, Virgin Media Two, Virgin Media Three and Virgin Media Four).

The service was launched on Saturday 8 October 2011. as 3Player replacing TV3 Catch Up service. On 30 August 2018, as a part of a corporate-wide rebrand of the TV3 Group as Virgin Media Television, the service was rebranded as Virgin Media Player.

The streaming service was relaunched and renamed as "Virgin Media Play" in August 2024, as part of a wider rebrand for the TV network.

== Content ==
Virgin Media Play is a largely a free online catch-up service which lets viewers watch a variety of programmes for up to 28 days after they are broadcast on Virgin Media Television branded channels. Most programmes are available for 28 days from the day they were broadcast. Due to programme rights however other programmes, mainly ITV productions are only available for 90 days. The majority of TV3 and 3e's broadcasts are available on the service. Both channels are also available live as they broadcast on this service.

As of May 2013, Virgin Media Player users are now asked to register their details. TV3 Group is encouraging users of its 3player catch-up service to register as part of a push to gather more information on its online audience. The change is part of a broader reconfiguration of its website that sees the introduction of new hourly online news bulletins from today. Registered 3player users will be able to create playlists of their favourite shows and use their logins to pick up where they left off across all devices.

== Format ==
The service utilises HTML5. This allows viewers to access the service regardless of their operating system.

== Availability ==
The service is available to those resident in the Republic of Ireland. The service is available on PCs and Mac format desktop and laptop devices. It is also available via Sony Bravia internet enabled TVs and certain Sony Blu-ray players. It became available on PS3 on 22 December 2011.

3player was made available to UPC Ireland customers through their televisions from 25 May 2012.

3player is available to Sky+HD Customers that are connected to On Demand with a broadband connection since 15 January 2014.

3player was released on the Xbox 360 on 2 April 2014 and Xbox One on 24 February 2015
