= Oireachtas TV =

Irish television channel

- Country: Ireland

Programming
- Languages: Irish, English

Ownership
- Owner: Oireachtas Commission

History
- Launched: 15 November 2011; 22 September 2014

Links
- Website: Official website

Availability

Terrestrial
- Saorview: Channel 22

Streaming media
- Oireachtas.ie: Watch live and on demand

Oireachtas TV, formally the Houses of the Oireachtas Channel (Irish: Bealach Thithe an Oireachtais), is a public service broadcaster for the two houses of the Oireachtas (Irish parliament).

The channel was created under the Broadcasting Act 2009 for broadcast on the proposed roll out of Irish Digital Terrestrial Television. The channel broadcasts in the Irish and English languages.

== History ==
Oireachtas TV has been available online for a number of years and both public service broadcasters RTÉ and TG4 have carried coverage of each of the Houses of the Oireachtas. RTÉ provides a late night round up with the Oireachtas Report and at noon Leaders Questions. TG4 broadcast live Dáil proceedings with their service Dáil Beo and also provide extensive live coverage of Committee meetings.

In November 2007, Taoiseach Bertie Ahern announced in the Dáil that he favoured an Oireachtas channel stating that "compared with a lot of tripe that is on TV, the Oireachtas channel would be far better and very interesting". Since the statement the government have moved to make Oireachtas TV a reality on the digital terrestrial platform (Saorview) in Ireland, and have included it in the Broadcasting Act 2009. Chapter 6 of the Broadcasting Act 2009 sets out the role of the Houses of the Oireachtas Channel. However the Oireachtas Commission have yet to decide when the launch will occur.

On 15 November 2011, Oireachtas TV began broadcasting on UPC Ireland channel 801, initially as part of a trial initiative for a period of six months. The trial service was delivered at no additional cost to the Houses of the Oireachtas or the tax-payer. On 18 September 2012, Oireachtas TV moved to channel 207 following a positive public reaction to the service. It launched on Sky on 17 September 2014.

== Cost ==
The channel will cost €200,000 annually to broadcast and is financed through the taxpayer. The channel has put aside €250,000 to provide the service on all major television service providers.

== Availability ==
The channel was first launched on a trial basis on Saorview. The pilot channel later launched on UPC Ireland on November 15, 2011. By September 2014 UPC confirmed a 20% growth in viewership of the channel on their service. The channel later became available on Sky Ireland on 17 September 2014. The channel formally launched on 22 September 2014 and is now available on UPC Ireland, and Sky Ireland. Eircom's eVision started broadcasting the channel on 14 November 2014. The channel has a potential market of 1.1 million viewers. On 12 January 2016 it became available on Saorview.

== See also ==
- BBC Parliament
- C-SPAN
