= Virgin Media More =

Irish television channel

- Country: Ireland
- Network: Virgin Media Television

Programming
- Language: English
- Picture format: 1080i HDTV (downscaled to 16:9 576i for the SDTV feed)

Ownership
- Owner: Virgin Media Ireland
- Sister channels: Virgin Media One; Virgin Media Two; Virgin Media Three; Virgin Media Four

History
- Launched: April 12, 2022; 3 years ago
- Closed: November 28, 2025

Links
- Website: http://www.virginmedia.ie/more

Availability

Terrestrial
- Virgin Media Ireland: Channel 100

Streaming media
- Virgin TV Anywhere: Watch live (Ireland only)

Virgin Media More was an Irish television channel from Virgin Media Television. The channel was exclusive to Virgin Media Ireland customers and is not available on other digital television platforms.

The channel focused on broadcasting first see episodes of Irish and international dramas, documentaries, films and sports. Some shows will eventually air on Virgin Media's free-to-air channels at a later date. For example, Holding premiered in Ireland on Virgin Media More on 12 April 2022, and started airing on Virgin Media One 5 months later on 12 September 2022.

The channel launched on 12 April 2022, but closed on 28 November 2025.

== History ==
Virgin Media Ireland confirmed it would launch a new channel in spring 2022 exclusive to Virgin Media customers in Ireland.

The channel replaced Virgin 100 on Virgin Media Ireland channel 100.

On 11 April, the day before the channel's launch, Virgin Media Sport ceased operations and the channel's sport content moved to Virgin Media More.

The channel launched on 12 April at 9 pm with the Irish premiere of Holding. However, earlier in the day, the channel broadcast a pre-launch filler This is Virgin Media More to promote the new channel. The TV guides had slots unfilled for the channel listed as To be announced until programming was confirmed prior to the launch.

The channel was voiced by Dave Cronin until September 2024, who was the sole continuity announcer.

On 28 November 2025, the channel was quietly closed down and was replaced by a barker channel on Virgin Media channel 100.

== Programming ==
- Holding
- Trigger Point
- The Guards: Inside the K
- The Ipcress File
- Sports Stories
- Europa League
- Love Island USA
