= Sky Witness =

British pay television channel

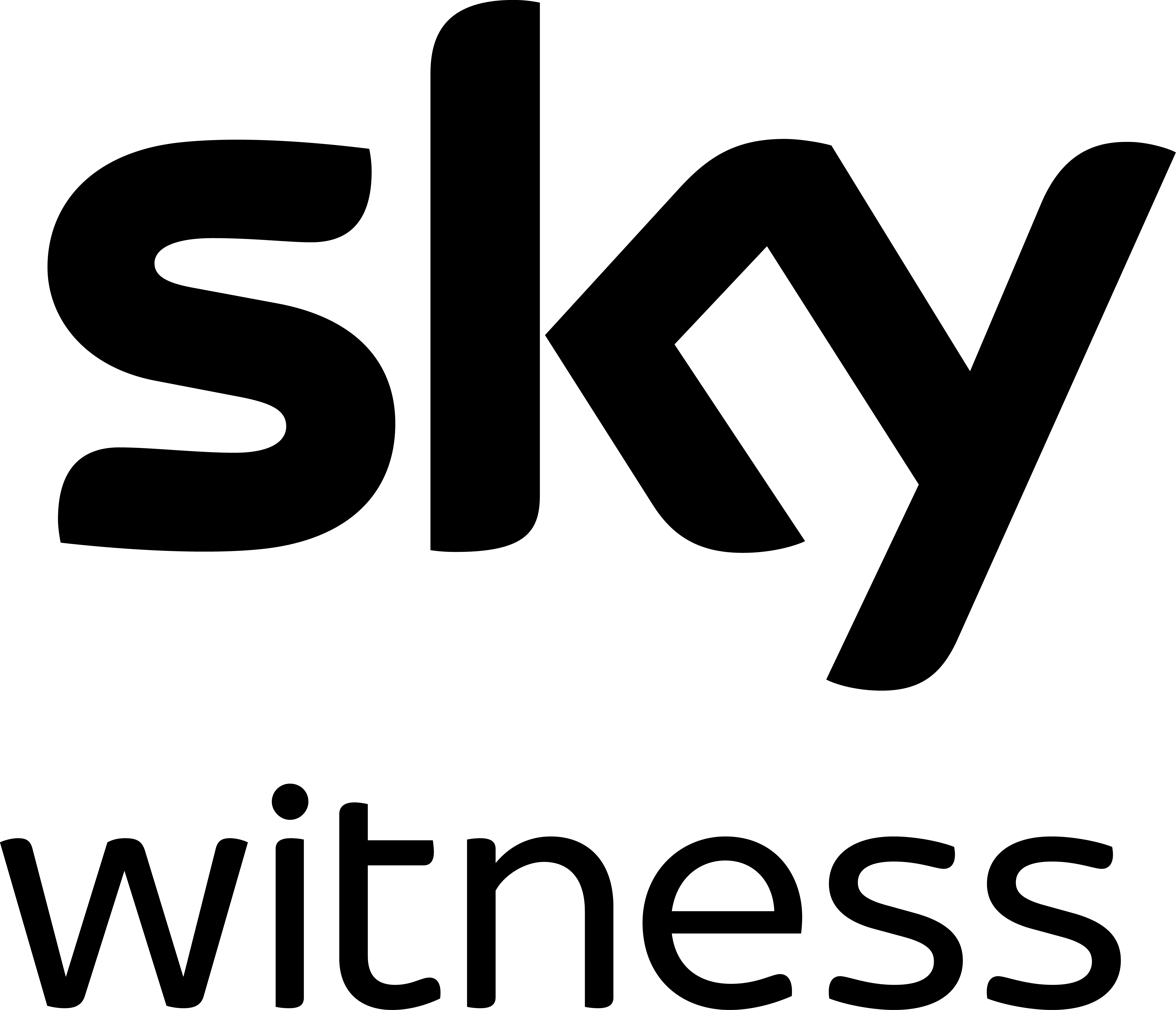
- Logo used since 2026

- Alternate Logo for UI/EPG, digital and small format spaces.

Programming
- Picture format: 1080i HDTV (downscaled to 16:9 576i for the SDTV feed.)
- Timeshift service: Sky Witness +1

Ownership
- Owner: Sky Group (Comcast)
- Sister channels: List of Sky UK channels

History
- Launched: 6 August 2018; 8 years ago
- Replaced: Sky Living

Availability

Streaming media
- Sky Go: Watch live (UK and Ireland only)
- Now: Watch live (UK and Ireland only)
- Virgin TV Go: Watch live (UK only)
- Virgin TV Anywhere: Watch live (Ireland only); Watch live (+1) (Ireland only)

Sky Witness is a British pay television channel owned and operated by Sky, a division of Comcast. The channel primarily broadcasts procedural dramas from the United States aimed at the 18–45 age demographic. Sky Italia broadcasts an Italian-language version of Sky Witness, called Sky Investigation, which launched on 1 July 2021.

== History ==
Sky Witness's history can be traced back to 1993 when UK Living began broadcasting. The channel was purchased by BSkyB in 2010 and announced on 25 October 2010, that Living would be rebranded as Sky Living in early 2011 to improve their entertainment line-up.

On 8 June 2018, Sky announced that Sky Living would be closed and replaced on 6 August by a new channel Sky Witness, bringing an end to the Living brand after 25 years.

Following the acquisition of Sky by Comcast in 2018, much of the programming previously screened on the Comcast-owned Universal TV (particularly first-run acquired series) was moved to Sky Witness; allowing the channel to be closed and replaced by Sky Comedy.

== Current programming ==
=== Acquired programming ===
- Chicago Fire (series 7–present) (Note: Moved from Sky Living)
- Chicago Med (series 5–present) (Note: Moved from Universal TV)
- Chicago P.D. (series 7–present) (Note: Moved from 5USA)
- CIA
- Doc
- Elsbeth
- FBI
- Fire Country
- Irish Blood
- Law & Order: Organized Crime
- Law & Order: Special Victims Unit (series 21–present)
- Matlock
- The Rookie

== Upcoming programming ==
=== Acquired programming ===
- Line of Fire (TBA)

== International ==
=== Sky Witness in Ireland ===
Sky Witness is also available in Ireland via Sky Ireland and Virgin Media Ireland. The Irish opt-out feed features localised advertising and sponsorship.

The same Sky Witness schedule, shown in both the UK and Ireland, also includes a selection of documentary programming from both the Irish Broadcasters, RTE and TV3/Virgin Media Television Ireland (the Irish broadcaster now owned by the cable TV company of the same name in Ireland, not to be confused with the earlier Flextech version of Virgin Media Television). Also there is some independently produced series, some commissioned directly by Sky, focusing on Ireland's various emergency services, medical, and certain Government of Ireland agencies, such as the Revenue Commissioners. The selection is similar to the genres focusing on other countries equivalent agencies, also shown on Sky Witness.

=== Sky Investigation ===
An Italian-language version of Sky Witness called Sky Investigation launched on 1 July 2021 with programming such as The Equalizer, Unforgettable, The Blacklist, Coroner, Law & Order, Law & Order: SVU, Bull, Private Eyes, Elementary and NCIS.
