= Virgin Media Sport (TV channel) =

Irish television channel

Coordinates: 53.309565°N 6.35564°W

- Country: Ireland
- Network: Virgin Media Television

Programming
- Language: English

Ownership
- Owner: Virgin Media Ireland
- Sister channels: Virgin Media One; Virgin Media Two; Virgin Media Three

History
- Launched: September 18, 2018
- Closed: April 11, 2022
- Replaced by: Virgin Media More

Links
- Website: www.virginmediatelevision.ie

Availability

Streaming media
- Virgin Media Anywhere: Watch live (Ireland only)

Virgin Media Sport was an Irish subscription television channel operated by Virgin Media Ireland and owned by Liberty Global. The channel launched on 18 September 2018.

The channel was available on the Virgin Media Ireland cable service. The channel closed on 11 April 2022 with content moving to Virgin Media channel 100 – Virgin Media More.

== History ==
As part of a major rebrand and refocusing of the Virgin Media brand in Ireland, the TV3 Group confirmed it planned to launch a sports channel in August 2018. Virgin Media Sport is the fourth channel by Virgin Media Television, Broadcasting Authority of Ireland approved a new Section 71 licence.

According to the Irish Independent, the new channel would create 20 to 30 new jobs.

The channel would be home to UEFA Champions League and UEFA Europa League matches from 2018–2021. Virgin Media Sport has also done a deal with CAA11, the representatives of UEFA in international football, which gives the broadcaster the rights to all competitive European international football outside of Republic of Ireland team matches, such as UEFA Nations League plus qualifiers for the UEFA European Championship and FIFA World Cup. The channel will also broadcast the Six Nations tournament.

On 15 August 2019, eir Sport and Virgin Media Sport signed a deal to show Virgin Media Sport on eir Vision and eir Sport 1 on Virgin Media Ireland.

On 12 September 2019, Virgin Media Sport HD launched on Sky on channel 422. Virgin Media Sport Extra 1 – 6 is available on Sky using the red button. The Virgin Media Sport channels on Sky are provided by eir in their eir Sport Pack. On 13 August 2020, its feeds on eir and Sky Ireland that were provided by eir were replaced by eir Sport 2 on those platforms, as eir refused to pay the contracted distribution license fee.

== See also ==
- List of television channels available in Ireland
