= Virgin Media Sport =

Irish television sports producer

- Formerly: TV3 Sport
- Type: Sports coverage
- Genre: Sport
- Founded: 1998
- Headquarters: Dublin, Ireland
- Area served: Ireland
- Parent: Virgin Media Television
- Website: virginmediatelevision.ie

Virgin Media Sport (formerly TV3 Sport) is a sports production unit at Virgin Media Television in Ireland which produces specialist sports content for its television channels Virgin Media One, Virgin Media Two, and Virgin Media Three. The department launched a sports channel in September 2018. The Virgin Media Sport TV Channel ultimately closed on 12 April 2022, to make way for Virgin Media More, a general entertainment TV channel, which would now host the defunct sports channel's content instead.

== Programming ==
Regular broadcasts include coverage of the UEFA Champions League (including UEFA Champions League Magazine) and the UEFA Europa League. Past programming includes the long-running Sports Tonight.

In addition, TV3 has had partial or complete rights to a number of tournaments, including the 2007 Rugby World Cup, 2015 Rugby World Cup and UEFA Euro 2016. Other noteworthy moments including providing Europe-wide coverage of the 2011 UEFA Europa League Final (as it was held in Dublin) and coverage of England's FA Cup finals (beginning 2015). From its infancy TV3 aired a live sporting programme called Sports Tonight (1998–2009) hosted by Trevor Welsh. The show would air weeknights from 23:30, until its controversial cancellation on 23 March 2009.

At its launch TV3 secured rights to number of Republic of Ireland exhibition matches. It joined forces with Sky to provide deferred coverage of World Cup Qualifying games along with a programme dedicated to League of Ireland games, The Soccer Show and live coverage of League of Ireland games. Later those games moved to RTÉ after the government chose to put those games on a live free-to-air footing.

TV3 currently holds the Irish broadcasting rights to 2018 for UEFA Champions League on Tuesday nights, while RTÉ 2 covers Wednesday nights and the final exclusively live. which includes in-vision sporting commentary and analysis by TV3 Sport presenters and crew. Coverage is presented by Tommy Martin alongside 2 pundits examples being Graeme Souness, Harry Redknapp, Brian Kerr, Neil Lennon, Martin Keown or Tony Cascarino. Commentary is provided by Dave McIntyre and Kevin Kilbane or Mark Lawrenson with Trevor Welsh also providing highlights commentary. TV3 previously held exclusive Irish rights from 2001–2004. It then lost these to RTÉ but since 2009 have shared rights with RTÉ and will continue to have these rights until 2018. TV3 also held rights to the UEFA Europa League matches on Thursday nights until 2015. In 2015 TV3 began airing the FA Cup Final live and will do so through to 2018. The coverage was presented by Tommy Martin alongside Paul McShane and Brian Kerr with commentary by Dave McIntyre and Kevin Kilbane.

A milestone in TV3 broadcasting history came with coverage of the 2011 UEFA Europa League Final, held at the Aviva Stadium in Dublin. Forty cameras were used to broadcast to an audience in the tens of millions across the world.

From 2008 to 2013 TV3 secured broadcasting rights for a selection of GAA All-Ireland Senior Football Championship and All-Ireland Senior Hurling Championship matches as part of Championship Live. In 2008, the station began broadcasting a selection of live matches, as well as a weekly preview show called Championship Throw In. TV3 lost these rights in 2014 to Sky Sports.

TV3 first aired Rugby with coverage of the 2007 Rugby World Cup. The channel had coverage of 13 games with all Ireland matches, quarter-finals, semi-finals, the final and the opening match shown live alongside Setanta Ireland who broadcast all matches. TV3 coverage in 2007 was hosted by Matt Cooper with analysis by Paul Wallace, Trevor Brennan, Jim Glennon, Michael Cheika, Jim Williams and Victor Costello. The commentators were Conor McNamara and Phillip Matthews.

Days after the loss of Gaelic games Championship rights in 2014, the station secured live free to air coverage of the 2015 Rugby World Cup. TV3 broadcast all 48 matches in the 2015 Rugby World Cup. Coverage was presented by Matt Cooper or Tommy Martin alongside Keith Wood, Matt Williams, Peter Stringer, Shane Jennings, Neil Back, Murray Kinsella with commentary by 2 commentary teams – the first being Conor McNamara, Stuart Barnes and Liam Toland and the second being Dave McIntyre and Hugo McNeill. Other commentary was provided by the world field such as Andrew Cotter, Joel Stransky, Alan Quinlan, Chris Patterson. The coverage has been met with significant criticism due to the high number of ad breaks and their positioning throughout the coverage. After a successful Rugby World Cup for TV3 they shocked RTÉ Sport in November 2015 by winning the rights to broadcast all matches in the 6 Nations from 2018–2021 with RTÉ continuing to cover the tournament in 2016–2017.

== Association football ==
TV3 currently holds the Irish broadcasting rights to UEFA Champions League on Tuesday nights and UEFA Europa League matches on Thursday nights, while RTÉ 2 covers Wednesday nights and the final exclusively live. which includes in-vision sporting commentary and analysis by TV3 Sport presenters and crew. TV3 previously held exclusive Irish rights from 2001-2004 they then lost these to RTÉ but since 2009 have shared rights with RTÉ and will continue to have these right until 2018.

The current presenter for TV3 Football coverage is Tommy Martin while analysis comes from Neil Lennon, Kevin Kilbane, Tony Cascarino, Martin Keown with Commentary by Trevor Welsh/Dave McIntyre and Mark Lawrenson. Mark Lawrenson is the only broadcaster to be a part of TV3 Champions League coverage from it started in 2001 to the present day. Other pundits such as Kevin Kilbane, Michael O'Neill and Brian Kerr are used for Europa League and when pundits are unavailable. Former presenters/pundits/commentators for TV3 include Kirsteen O'Sullivan, John Toshack, Matt Cooper, Packie Bonner, Conor McNamara, Aidan Cooney and Ronnie Whelan.

A milestone in TV3 broadcasting history came with coverage of the 2011 UEFA Europa League Final, held at the Aviva Stadium in Dublin. Forty cameras were used to broadcast to an audience in the tens of millions across the world.

At its launch TV3 secured rights to number of Republic of Ireland exhibition matches. It joined forces with Sky to provide deferred coverage of World Cup Qualifying games along with a programme dedicated to League Of Ireland games, The Soccer Show and live coverage of League of Ireland games. Later those games moved to RTÉ after the government chose to put those games on a live free-to-air footing.

TV3 broadcast the 2015 FA Cup Final, where Aston Villa (with Shay Given in goal) made their TV3 debut against Arsenal (whose Champions League games had often been shown previously). TV3 broadcast the 2016 FA Cup Final, where Crystal Palace (with Damien Delaney in defence) made their TV3 debut against Manchester United (whose Champions League games had often been shown previously).

TV3 also secured rights to broadcast matches during UEFA Euro 2016.

== Rugby union ==
TV3 aired coverage of the 2007 Rugby World Cup. The channel had coverage of 13 games with all Ireland matches, quarter-finals, semi-finals, the final and the opening match shown live along with Setanta Ireland who broadcast all matches. TV3 coverage in 2007 was hosted by Matt Cooper with analysis by Paul Wallace, Trevor Brennan, Jim Glennon, Michael Cheika, Jim Williams and Victor Costello. The commentators were Conor McNamara and Phillip Matthews.

Days after the loss of Gaelic games Championship rights in 2014, the station secured live free to air coverage of the 2015 Rugby World Cup: it is expected that 20 of the top games will air on TV3, while the rest will air on sister channel 3e. In February 2015 TV3 announced its team which would front the tournament for the channel, coverage was hosted by Matt Cooper or Sinead Kissane with pundits including Keith Wood, Peter Stringer, Shane Jennings, Stuart Barnes, Neil Back, Hugo McNeill, Matt Williams, Liam Toland & Murray Kinsella. Commentary was provided by Conor McNamara. TV3 shocked RTE Sport in November 2015 by winning the rights to broadcast all matches in the 6 Nations from 2018–2021 with RTE covering the tournament in 2016–2017.

For their first Six Nations campaign, TV3 coverage was presented by Joe Molloy, with Ronan O'Gara, Shane Horgan, Shane Jennings, Matt Williams, Stephen Ferris and Peter Stringer as pundits. The main commentator was Dave McIntyre as well as Conor McNamara and John Forrest. whilst Alan Quinlan Luke Fitzgerald, Mike Ruddock and Shane Byrne were also co-commentators. The main reporter was Sinead Kissané.

== Gaelic games ==
From 2008 to 2013 TV3 secured broadcasting rights for a selection of GAA All-Ireland Senior Football Championship and All-Ireland Senior Hurling Championship matches as part of Championship Live. In 2008, the station began broadcasting a selection of live matches, as well as a weekly preview show called Championship Throw In. TV3 lost these rights in 2014 to Sky Sports.

== Other ==
From its infancy TV3 aired a live sporting programme called Sports Tonight (1998–2009) hosted by Trevor Welsh. The show would air weeknights from 23:30, until its controversial cancellation on 23 March 2009.

In 1999, TV3 Sport also produced the short-lived sports quiz show A Game of Two Halves, also hosted by Trevor Welsh, which ran for 13 episodes. Another short-lived sports show was 2005's The Offside Show, which ran for 12 episodes.
