= Cúla4 =

Cúla 4
- Logo used since 11 April 2022
- Country: Ireland
- Broadcast area: Ireland; Northern Ireland; Worldwide (online)

Programming
- Language: Irish
- Picture format: 1080i HDTV (downscaled to 576i for the SDTV feed)

Ownership
- Owner: Teilifís na Gaeilge
- Sister channels: TG4

History
- Launched: 31 October 1996 (programming block); 1 September 2009 (simulcast channel on UPC); 8 September 2023 (standalone channel)
- Former names: Cúlabúla (1996–1999)

Links
- Website: Cúla4.com

Availability

Terrestrial
- Saorview: Channel 18
- Freeview (UK): Channel 51 (Northern Ireland only)

Streaming media
- TG4: Watch live (TG4)
- Virgin TV Anywhere: Watch live (Ireland only)
- AerTV: Watch live (TG4, Ireland only)

Cúla4 (Irish: Cúla Ceathair) is an Irish-language programming block and standalone television channel operated by TG4 for Irish-speaking children in the Republic of Ireland and Northern Ireland. The channel broadcasts free-to-air from 6am to 7:54pm, timesharing with TG4 +1, which starts at 8pm.

== History ==
The strand was first established in 1996 as Cúlabúla along with the rebrand of TnaG to TG4. In 1999, Cúlabúla was renamed Cúla4. On 1 September 2009, Cúla4 was added as a separate channel to UPC customers on channel 602. A new schedule coincided with the launch on UPC.

In November 2021, TG4 announced that it was planning to launch Cúla4 as a channel available for all Irish TV providers. An advertising campaign for the channel was launched in early September 2023 and advertisements were played on TV and in cinemas. The channel launched on 8 September at 4pm, replacing the simulcast on Virgin Media and also being added to Sky in Ireland. The first programme aired on the channel was an episode of Pat the Dog.

== Programming ==
The majority of Cúla4's programming is a mixture of national and international programmes which are either dubbed or subtitled in Irish. Cúla4 works with international broadcasters to produce Irish dubs of TV series which are seen on Nickelodeon, Cartoon Network, PBS and Discovery Family. It also works with homegrown animation companies to produce localised series. Cúla4's programming is either in Irish or in Irish and English, unlike its competition where the majority of their programmes are entirely in English.

=== Cúla4 ar Scoil ===
Cúla4 Ar Scoil was launched in April 2020 in response to the closure of all schools during the COVID-19 pandemic in the Republic of Ireland in 2020, following RTÉ's launch of Home School Hub in March. It was recorded in Connemara with teachers Caitríona Ní Chualáin and Fiachra Ó Dubhghaill presenting daily lessons for the 30-minute show. A second series began in September with teachers Orla Ní Fhinneadha and Micheál Ó Dubhghaill.

== See also ==
- Hacio, Welsh language current affairs programme, for young people.
- Cyw, strand of Welsh language programming, for younger children.
- Stwnsh, strand of Welsh language programming, for children between the ages of 7 to 13.
- Toonattik, strand of the British television station ITV1, for children between the ages of 4 to 12.
