= Irish TV =

Defunct Irish television channel

- Country: Ireland
- Broadcast area: Ireland, United Kingdom, United States

Programming
- Picture format: 576i (16:9) SDTV

Ownership
- Owner: The Irish Post

History
- Launched: 1 May 2014
- Replaced: Showcase
- Closed: 8 March 2017
- Replaced by: Spike +1

Links
- Website: http://www.irishtv.ie

Irish TV was an Irish television channel. It had offices across Ireland and in the US and UK. It was headquartered in County Mayo, Ireland.

== History ==
Founders Mairead Ní Mhaoilchiaráin and Pierce O'Reilly trialled Mayo TV for a number of years before setting up Irish TV. On 20 August 2014 the Broadcasting Authority of Ireland (BAI) entered into negotiations with Irish TV for a broadcast licence.

Irish TV launched on 1 May 2014 as a channel containing Irish content targeted at Irish people at home, and abroad as part of the global Irish diaspora. The channel originally ran as part of Showcase on Freesat channel 163 and Sky channel 191.

In July 2016 Irish TV received ministerial approval from Minister for Communications Denis Naughten to launch on the Irish Digital Terrestrial Saorview platform.

The terrestrial station was allocated channel number No.7 on the platform.

In December 2016, the High Court in Ireland asked for the company to be wound up following a period of liquidation.

On 21 December 2016, Irish TV confirmed the station's closure.

On 2 February 2017, The Irish Post acquired Irish TV, saving the channel from closure.

On 8 March 2017, without warning, Irish TV went off the air. Its Sky slot was bought by Viacom International Media Networks Europe to launch Spike +1.

== Programming ==
County Matters was the flagship news programme on Irish TV which had developed into a nationwide 32-county wide series composed of weekly half-hour programmes from each county (Dublin County Matters; Mayo County Matters; Cork County Matters etc.). The series fulfilled the Irish TV motto of Local Stories, Global Audience and promises to document ordinary people doing extraordinary things through broadcasting the news and views from each region. The series covered 16 hours of broadcasting on the channel each week.

Irish TV also broadcast a wide range of music, entertainment, sports, special interest and live documentaries and in 2015 founded the first ever Irish County Music Awards on television.

To coincide with its launch on Saorview in Autumn 2016 the channel launched a live weekend chat show to be hosted by popular presenter and musician Malachi Cush.

The channel also entered into a media partnership with the global Tata Communications network to deliver Irish TV across the USA while delivery links were also being established to cover the UK, Canada and Australia.

== Sport ==
Sports events covered by Irish TV included:

Athletics

- AIT Indoor Grand Prix
- Morton Games
- Cork City Sports
- Antrim International Cross-Country
- Mary Peters Belfast International
- European Team Athletics Championships

Soccer

- FAI Junior Cup

Gaelic Games

- All-Ireland Masters
- Munster Camogie Championship
- All-Ireland Intermediate and Junior Club Finals
- London GAA County Finals

Cycling

- Junior Tour of Ireland

Golf

- Irish Matchplay Pitch & Putt

== See also ==
- RTÉ
