= Virgin Media Television (Ireland) =

Irish television company

Coordinates: 53.309565°N 6.35564°W

Virgin Media Television Ltd.
- Formerly: • TV3 Television Network Ltd. (legal name until August 2018) • TV3 Group (trade name until August 2018)
- Type: Public/Limited
- Industry: Broadcasting
- Founded: September 20, 1998; 27 years ago
- Founder: • John Kelleher • Ossie Kilkenny • Paul McGuinness • James Morris
- Headquarters: Ballymount, Dublin, Ireland
- Area served: Republic of Ireland and Northern Ireland
- Key people: Paul Farrell
- Products: • Television services • Transmission • E-publishing (teletext and web) • Commercial telecoms services
- Revenue: ▲€57.4 million (2009)
- Number of employees: 250 (2015)
- Parent: Virgin Media Ireland
- Website: virginmediatelevision.ie

Virgin Media Television Ltd. (formerly known as TV3 Television Network Ltd.; previously traded as the TV3 Group until August 2018) is a commercial television company in Ireland, based in Dublin. Launched in 1998 as TV3 Television Network, the TV3 Group was formed in January 2009. The company was acquired by Liberty Global in 2015, and the channels were rebranded to Virgin Media Television in 2018.

Virgin Media Ireland was reportedly put up for sale by its owner Liberty Global in June 2021. By November 2021, the then chief executive had reportedly "ruled this out".

== History ==
Virgin Media Television (previously TV3 Television Network Ltd and later TV3 Group) is operated by Virgin Media Ireland and owned by Liberty Global. Under its previous operations TV3 Television Network Ltd and later the TV3 Group; the company was owned by different companies including Canwest, Granada and Doughty Hanson & Co.

The initial company TV3 Television Network Ltd was established in the early 1990s as a response to the development of the Independent Radio & Television Commission (IRTC) in October 1998. The former broadcasting regular IRTC (now the Broadcasting Authority of Ireland) was created to regulate broadcasting in Ireland. In 1990 following an invitation by the IRTC to seek interests from independent broadcasters, a consortium (Tullamore Beta Ltd) came together to launch Ireland's first independent channel and third terrestrial channel. The launch of TV3 was delayed and the licence was revoked due to this delay. Following a court case, the license was eventually restored in 1993. It was agreed that 49% of the company would be sold to UTV, to raise much-needed cash for investment in facilities. By 1995, UTV decided not to partner up with Tullamore Beta and instead focused on its own channels being made available through digital television providers in Ireland. In 1997, Canadian communications company Canwest bought a major stake in the new company in order to help launch the independent network.

=== Canwest: 1998–2001 ===
By 1998, Canwest was already a major owner of television and radio stations across a number of territories including Canada, New Zealand and Australia. The consortium Tullamore Beta and Canwest launched TV3 on 20 September 1998. However, in 2001 Canwest confirmed it would sell a stake to ITV plc.

=== Canwest & ITV: 2001–2006 ===
In September 2000, Granada Media plc (a predecessor company of ITV plc which then owned six ITV franchises) agreed to acquire 45% of the company from the original TV3 consortium. This was part of a deal which gave TV3 the right to simulcast with ITV certain Granada programming. The Granada plc shareholding was taken over by ITV plc upon the merger of Granada with Carlton on 2 February 2004. In early 2001, the station officially launched threetext, the teletext service, much of the content from Thomas Crosbie Media. Test transmissions of this service commenced in late 2000, but as early as 1999 limited programming content was provided. However, in 2004, the news and sports were dropped as part of a rebranding to an 'entertainment portal'.

On 16 January 2006, Canwest announced to TV3 staff, that it was selling its stake in the channel, in an effort to reduce its debt. Following this announcement on 19 May 2006 it was confirmed that Doughty Hanson & Co, a venture capital firm based in Luxembourg had purchased the stakes of Canwest (for €103 million) and ITV Plc's stake (for €103 million), and the remaining 10% (for €59 million).

=== Doughty Hanson & Co: 2006–2015 ===
In 2006, the company's new owner Doughty Hanson & Co. arranged a loan through Anglo Irish Bank to take control of the company through Tullamore Beta Ltd. Under this ownership Doughty Hanson tried to move beyond television broadcasting and showed interest in acquiring a radio broadcasting license under the branding More FM, however the licence was granted to Classic Hits 4FM. By 2008, the company expanded its channel portfolio with the acquisition of Kish Media then owners of Channel 6. Channel 6 was later refocused under the TV3 Group branding and was renamed 3e. By January 2008, the TV3 Group composed of TV3, 3e, tv3.ie and 3Player.

Doughty Hanson & Co came together with Eircom to produce a consortium to establish Ireland's commercial digital terrestrial television subscription service then titled Onevision. Following a tender process the BAI deemed the consortium unsuccessful despite Onevision planning to launch additional TV3 branded channels (3Today and 3XPOSÉ).

By 2011, the broadcaster planned its commitment to high definition broadcasting technologies and the company laid down plans to establish a HD studio, which was eventually launched in Spring 2013 at cost of €5 million. The studio was developed to produce key programming in HD and offering independent companies and public broadcasters the opportunity to make use of the new studios.

By 2015, Doughty Hanson & Co confirmed it planned on selling the TV3 Group; as the holding company decided to abandon television broadcasting.

=== Virgin Media Ireland: 2015–present ===
Despite speculation from different companies seeking interest in the TV3 Group, by mid-2015 it was confirmed Liberty Global would purchase the company through its Irish subsidiary Virgin Media Ireland. Doughty Hanson & Co sold the company for €80 million and an additional €7 million should the "group" meet certain targets. The acquisition of TV3 was approved by the Competition and Consumer Protection Commission in November 2015 and it was passed to then Minister for Communications, Alex White, for approval which he gave in December 2015. CEO David McRedmond announced that he was to leave the company by the end of 2015.

Expanding its channel portfolio, Liberty Global went onto purchase UTV Ireland from ITV plc for €10 million. On 17 November 2016 UTV Ireland was taken over by the TV3 Group. The channel was rebranded in January 2017.

By late 2017; Virgin Media Ireland confirmed it would rebrand its channel portfolio, however, this was delayed until summer 2018. On 30 August 2018 Virgin Media Television completed its rebranding strategy.

In May 2020, Pat Kiely stepped down as managing director and was replaced by Paul Farrell.

The streaming service was renamed "Virgin Media Play" in August 2024, as part of a wider rebrand for the TV network, launching in September.

In 2026, Virgin Media Television Ireland signed a content agreement with NBC to broadcast classic episodes of Friends, ER (TV series), Chicago Fire and other programmes from the network's television library. The programmes were also made available to stream on Virgin Media Play.

Following the announcement of Sky's acquisition of ITV's Media & Entertainment division in July 2026, media commentators suggested that the deal could have implications for Irish viewers and broadcasters that rely on ITV-sourced programming. As Virgin Media Television has historically acquired a range of ITV content for broadcast in the Republic of Ireland, the takeover raised questions about the future availability of such programming and whether Virgin Media would need to negotiate new carriage or content licensing agreements with Sky in order to retain access to ITV-branded content."End of an era for ITV could have implications for Irish viewers". The Irish Times. 21 July 2026."Sky agrees £1.6bn ITV deal as broadcasters take on streaming rivals". The Irish Times. 6 July 2026.

== Present services ==
=== Broadcasting ===
- Virgin Media One (formerly known as TV3): March 2006 (previously TV Three from 20 September 1998 to March 2006)
  - Virgin Media One HD: 11 August 2015
    - Virgin Media One +1: 2 December 2014
- Virgin Media Two (formerly known as 3e): 6 January 2009 (previously Channel 6 from March 2006 to January 2009)
  - Virgin Media Two HD (only available on Sky and Virgin Media)
- Virgin Media Three (formerly known as be3): January 2017 (previously UTV Ireland from January 2015 to January 2017)
  - Virgin Media Three HD (only available on Virgin Media)
- Virgin Media Four: Launched on August 24, 2022.

=== Production units ===
- Virgin Media Sport
- Virgin Media News

=== Virgin Media Play ===
Virgin Media Play, Virgin Media Television's Video on Demand (VOD) streaming service, is available online (at virginmediatelevision.ie), and on several app platforms (App Store, Google Play, Android TV, Google TV, Virgin Media Ireland, Sky and Now).

=== Website ===
With the rebranding of the entire TV3 Group in August 2018, the website address changed to "virginmediatelevision.ie",

As well as this website hosting the online player service, it also hosts News and TV Listings for its channels.

=== Defunct services ===
- Xposé Magazine: Ceased publishing 5 April 2017
- Virgin Media Kids (formerly known as "3Kids"): It launched on 27 June 2016 as a 3 hour block and had been previously aired on Virgin Media Three until being quietly discontinued on 18 September 2021.
- Virgin Media Sport: A channel dedicated to sports. It launched on 18 September 2018. However, it closed on 11 April 2022.
- Virgin Media More: A channel exclusive to Virgin Media customers that featured first look at Irish and international documentaries, films, dramas and sporting events. The channel launched on 12 April 2022, However, it closed on 28 November 2025.

== Virgin Media Television HD Studio ==
On 14 September 2012, the TV3 Group confirmed a new HD studios in Ballymount, Dublin. The studio officially opened in March 2013. TV3 Group confirmed it signed a partnership deal with Sony International.

As part of a multi-year deal, the studio will be named Sony HD Studio Dublin. TV3 also reinstated its commitment to launching a HD channel. The new HD studios will be used for current programming with TV3 News and other shows permanently moving to the new studios. TV3 Group will also offer independent production companies and international production companies the opportunity to use its facilities for future productions. TV3 Sony HD Studio Dublin is the largest TV studio in Ireland.

From 2016, Virgin Media Ireland took over sponsorship of the HD Studios – they are now known as the TV3-Virgin Media HD Studios.

In August 2018, the facility became known as the "Virgin Media Television HD Studio".

The studio in 2019 is now known as "Studio 2" at the Virgin Media Television complex in Dublin. It measures 464.515 square metres and can accommodate live studio audiences of up to 250 if required. "Studio 1" is the name of the original television studio in the complex which opened in 1998 when TV3 launched. Studio 1 was renovated and refurbished in 2017 and is now the main home to all Virgin Media News bulletins.

== Proposals ==
On 16 September 2012, it was reported by the Sunday Independent that TV3 was to launch two channels on Saorview. As of 2018, these channels never launched. According to a report into commercial DTT by Oliver & Ohlbaum Associates (O&O) for the BAI "TV3 appears not to have an appetite for distributing additional channels on the platform so we assume no new offerings from the group on DTT (Saorview)".

In 2011, TV3 Group revealed it had plans to launch further channels. These channels included TV3 HD (a high-definition simulcast), TV3 +1 (a one-hour timeshift channel), 3Kids (a children's channel) and 3Classics (a channel featuring classic Irish and international television shows). According to BAI documentation the channels were scheduled to launch by September 2013. As of 2014, the BAI confirmed TV3 had no interest in launching these channels in the immediate future and had not applied for a licence to broadcast such channels.

According to an article printed in the Irish edition of The Sunday Times in August 2014, TV3 Group intended to launch TV3 HD on both UPC and Sky in 2015. The article also stated that 3e would go HD in 2016. TV3 Group also hoped to launch an additional channel in 2016 with a pay TV element to it. The article also suggested that the TV3 Group might work more closely with Communicorp in terms of utilizing presenters.

On 17 January 2016, Sunday Business Post reported Virgin Media Ireland had plans to launch additional TV3 channels including a 24-hour rolling news channel. The TV3 Group later denied such reports.

== Ownership ==
=== 2012–2013 ===
In 2012, TV3 Group's owners Doughty Hanson indicated their wishes to sell off the company in due course. Speculation as to who would purchase the group continued into 2013 with Northern Ireland's UTV Media considered a major contender. However, in 2013 UTV confirmed plans it would launch its own Republic of Ireland service in early 2014 – branded as UTV Ireland. It launched on 1 January 2015, and in mid-2016 was acquired by TV3 Group, rebranding it as be3 just 2 years after its launch. It is now known as Virgin Media Three. Meanwhile, UTV Media sold its TV broadcasting operations to ITV plc in February 2016 and renamed itself Wireless Group, seven months before being acquired by News UK.

=== 2015–present ===
In early April 2015, a number of media groups were reporting TV3's owners Doughty Hanson were definitely interested in selling the TV3 Group. These reports were strengthened when Doughty Hanson confirmed it has scrapped plans for a sixth investment fund. A number of international broadcasters were reportedly interested in purchasing the Irish-based broadcaster including Viacom International Media Networks (VIMN) and Liberty Global. It was later reported VIMN has shown disinterest in purchasing the network but on 16 April 2015 both the Irish Independent and Sky News claimed Carlyle have shown interest in the broadcaster and negotiations were due to begin. Carlyle have begun investing in the Irish market. TV3 Group has declined requests from media organisations to comment on the rumours.

It was further reported on 3 May 2015 by The Sunday Business Post that Liberty Global are in negotiations to take over the broadcaster. They report that Liberty Global are to take over the Irish broadcaster after completing due diligence.

In June 2015, INM confirmed they would consider purchasing the TV3 Group. However, following criticism from individuals within media and political circles, INM claimed it was "highly unlikely" they would purchase the broadcaster, as there would be concern over how much control INM has over print and broadcasting media in Ireland.

On 12 June 2015, Irish media began reporting on the possible buyout by Liberty Global. Both companies refused to comment on the reports. Approval from the BAI will have to granted if the deal is to go through and may also involve approval from the Competition and Consumer Protection Commission. It will take a number of months before the acquisition is finalized. It is reported the TV3 Group will be sold to Liberty Global for €100 million.

On 3 July 2015, it was announced that Doughty Hanson had sold TV3 to a Liberty Global company which operated UPC Ireland for €80 million. The deal may also deliver a further €7 million should TV3 meet certain performance targets. The deal will need regulatory approval by Competition and Consumer Protection Commission as well as a media plurality test by the Department of Communications, Energy and Natural Resources. On 5 July 2015 The Sunday Business Post confirmed following an interview with TV3's CEO McRedmon that Liberty Global had shown interest in purchasing the TV3 Group since the previous year.

== Presenters ==
News and Current Affairs

- Colette Fitzpatrick

Entertainment

- Tommy Bowe
- Elaine Crowley
- Ray Foley
- Alan Hughes
- Martin King

Sport

- Packie Bonner
- Tony Cascarino
- Aidan Cooney
- Matt Cooper
- Martin Keown
- Mark Lawrenson
- Conor McNamara
- Paul Osam
- Kirsteen O'Sullivan
- Damien Richardson
- John Toshack

Former presenters

- Brian Daly
- Paul Byrne
- Matt Cooper
- Colette Fitzpatrick
- Pat Kenny
- Ivan Yates
- Ursula Halligan
- Paul Connolly
- Jenny McCudden
- Sybil Mulcahy
- Vincent Browne
- Alan Cantwell
- Claire Byrne
- Gráinne Seoige
- Trevor Welch
- Keith Duffy
- Brendan Courtney
- Bill Cullen
- Maura Derrane
- Lorraine Keane
- Patrick Kielty
- Anna Daly
- Tommy Bowe
- Amanda Byram
- Elaine Crowley
- Mark Cagney
- Sinead Desmond
- Ray Foley
- Glenda Gilson
- Alan Hughes
- Seán Munsanje
- Martin King
- Karen Koster
- David McWilliams
- Aisling O'Loughlin
- Nora Owen
- Una Power
- Cassie Stokes
- Rebecca Tallon de Havilland
- Ciara Whelan
- Laura Woods

Sport

- Packie Bonner
- Tony Cascarino
- Aidan Cooney
- Matt Cooper
- Martin Keown
- Mark Lawrenson
- Conor McNamara
- Paul Osam
- Kirsteen O'Sullivan
- Damien Richardson
- John Toshack
