= Virgin Media Four =

Irish television channel

- Country: Ireland
- Network: Virgin Media Television

Programming
- Language: English
- Picture format: 1080i HDTV (downscaled to 16:9 576i for the SDTV feed)

Ownership
- Owner: Virgin Media Ireland
- Sister channels: Virgin Media One; Virgin Media Two; Virgin Media Three

History
- Launched: 24 August 2022; 4 years ago

Links
- Website: https://www.virginmediatelevision.ie

Availability

Terrestrial
- Saorview: Channel 7

Streaming media
- Virgin TV Anywhere: Watch live (Ireland only)

Virgin Media Four is a free-to-air Irish television channel from Virgin Media Television.

The channel focuses on a number of sports and general entertainment programming mainly from Ireland, the US and the UK.

The channel launched on 24 August 2022.

== History ==
Virgin Media Ireland confirmed it would launch a new channel in August 2022, at a Virgin Media Showcase event. The channel is currently available on Saorview, Virgin Media and Sky. The channel made it to Virgin Media Play on the 2nd of September, 2024, following the rebrand.

The channels programming is largely a replay of previously aired content from across Virgin Media channels with little investment in Irish content. The channels schedule is dependent on content from UK broadcaster ITV and generally broadcasts double episodes of programmes to fill its schedule.

On 16 March 2023, the channel began testing on Sky, using the frequency 12363 V 27500 2/3 DVB-S2 8PSK, and was launched on Sky on 27 April 2023 on channel 160 and 159 (Sky Glass)

From 2026, Virgin Media Four began to air classic episodes of US dramas such as ER and Chicago Fire.

== Programming ==
- Winning Combination
- The Chase
- The Hotel Inspector
- Ireland’s Paramedics
- Don’t Look Back In Anger
- The Group Chat
- Two Sides
