= Sky Ireland =

Irish telecommunications company

Sky Ireland Limited
- Type: Subsidiary
- Industry: Mass media
- Founded: 1990; 36 years ago
- Headquarters: Dublin, Ireland
- Area served: Ireland
- Key people: JD Buckley (CEO)
- Services: Pay TV; Broadband; Phone
- Parent: Sky UK
- Subsidiaries: Now
- Website: www.sky.com/ie

Sky Ireland Limited is a subsidiary of Comcast-owned Sky UK and supplies television, internet and telephony services in Ireland.

Its corporate headquarters are in Dublin which were opened by Taoiseach Enda Kenny on 18 January 2013.

Sky Ireland employs around 900 staff in Dublin.

== History ==
- Sky Television started broadcasting in Ireland on 10 August 1992 and Sky Multichannels started on 7 March 1994.
- In 1998, Sky Digital launched its digital television services within Ireland.
- Sky Ireland provides opt-out feeds of key Sky television channels, which includes Sky One, Sky Sports, Sky News and Sky Atlantic.
- Sky Media Ireland is the media sales arm of Sky Ireland. They sell advertising opportunities across all of Sky's wholly owned channels, including Sky One, Sky Witness, Sky Atlantic, Sky News and Sky Sports. In addition, they sell on behalf of media partners, including Viacom International Media Networks Europe and Discovery Networks Northern Europe.
- Sky operated an Irish version of Sky News called Sky News Ireland from 2004 to 2006.
- As of January 2013, the company has 500 workers that work from its contact centre with a possible increase of 1,000 by year end. BSkyB chief executive Jeremy Darroch announced on 18 January 2013 that Sky Ireland will invest a further €1 billion over the next five years in Ireland.
- As of September 2013, Sky Ireland now employs 800 people at its Dublin base. Sky Ireland have confirmed they expect to invest €1.25 billion with expansion into the Irish market with Irish specific productions and further expansion of its existing Irish telecommunications company.
- In October 2013, Sky Ireland launched an on demand service to its Irish customers.
- In December 2013, Sky launched Ireland's biggest catch-up TV service.
- In 2017, NOW was launched in Ireland.
- In 2024, Sky launched its mobile network Sky Mobile in Ireland which uses the Vodafone network.

== Broadcasting ==
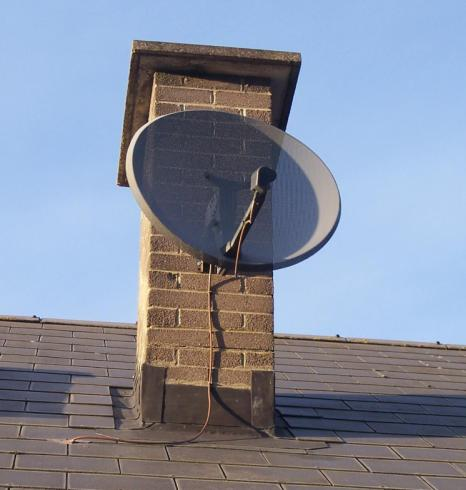
Sky Minidish

=== Transmission ===
When Sky Digital was launched in 1998 the new service used the Astra 2A satellite which was located at the 28.5°E orbital position, unlike the analogue service which was broadcast from 19.2°E. This was subsequently followed by more Astra satellites as well as Eutelsat's Eurobird 1 (now Eutelsat 28A) at 28.5°E), enabled the company to launch a new all-digital service, Sky, with the potential to carry hundreds of television and radio channels. The old position was shared with broadcasters from several European countries, while the new position at 28.5°E came to be used almost exclusively for channels that broadcast to the United Kingdom and Ireland.

New Astra satellites joined the position in 2000 and 2001, and the number of channels available to customers increased accordingly. This trend continued with the launch of Eurobird 1 (now Eutelsat 28A) in 2001. Additionally, some channels occasionally received new numbering — However, in early 2006, the majority of channels received new numbering, with some receiving single digit changes, whilst others received new numbers entirely.

Sky is currently transmitted from the Astra satellites located at 28.2° east (2A/2C/2E/2F) and Eutelsat's Eutelsat 28A satellite at 28.5°E.

=== Standard definition broadcasts ===
Sky's standard definition broadcasts are in DVB-compliant MPEG-2, with the Sky Cinema and Sky Box Office channels including optional Dolby Digital soundtracks for recent films, although these are only accessible with a Sky+ box. Sky+ HD material is broadcast using MPEG-4 and most of the HD material uses the DVB-S2 standard. Interactive services and 7-day EPG use the proprietary OpenTV system, with set-top boxes including modems for a return path. Sky News, amongst other channels, provides a pseudo-video on demand interactive service by broadcasting looping video streams.

=== Digital satellite receivers ===
Sky utilises the VideoGuard pay-TV scrambling system owned by NDS, a Cisco Systems company. There are tight controls over use of VideoGuard decoders; they are not available as stand-alone DVB CAMs (conditional-access modules). Sky has design authority over all digital satellite receivers capable of receiving their service. The receivers, though designed and built by different manufacturers, must conform to the same user interface look-and-feel as all the others. This extends to the Personal video recorder (PVR) offering (branded Sky+).

=== Electronic programme guide ===
==== Technology ====
Sky maintains an electronic programme guide (EPG) which provides information about upcoming programmes and a list of channels. Channels available on Sky are assigned a three digit logical channel number which can be entered on a remote control to access the channel and determines in what order channels are listed.

The EPG in Ireland gives priority to Irish channels. All channels are grouped into categories depending on their content. What section of the EPG a channel gets allocated is determined by rules set up by Sky Ireland.

Sky Ireland has no veto over the presence of channels on their EPG. Any channel which can get carriage on a suitable beam of a satellite at 28° East is entitled to access to Sky's EPG for a fee. Third-party channels which opt for encryption receive discounts ranging from reduced price to free EPG entries, free carriage on a Sky leased transponder, or actual payment for being carried. However, even in this case, Sky does not carry any control over the channel's content or carriage issues such as picture quality.

In October 2007, Sky's parent company Sky plc (then BSkyB) announced that they would not accept new applications to launch channel on their EPG, citing "very significant memory constraints" on many of its older digiboxes.

In June 2012, Sky Ireland launched a new EPG for Sky+ HD boxes. The update boasts a new modernised look and improved functionality.

== Sky Ireland EPG ==
The Sky EPG lists all channels carried on the Sky platform. Many channels are free, others are available only with a subscription. In Ireland, some channels provided by Sky have programming blocks or alternative schedules to their UK counterpart. Some channels also have adverts for the Irish market. Sky, and its sister companies, operate a number of channels in the UK and Ireland with some being joint ventures with other companies:

=== Active ===
==== Entertainment ====
- Sky One
- Sky Atlantic
- Sky Comedy
- Sky Witness (SD and HD)
- Sky Sci-Fi
- Sky Mix
- Comedy Central (joint venture with Paramount Global)
- Comedy Central Extra (joint venture with Paramount Global)
- Challenge

==== Lifestyle ====
- Blaze (joint venture with A+E Networks UK)

==== Factual ====
- Sky Arts
- Sky Crime
- Sky Documentaries
- Sky History (joint venture with A+E Networks UK)
- Sky History 2 (joint venture with A+E Networks UK)
- Sky Nature
- Crime & Investigation (joint venture with A+E Networks UK)

==== News ====
- Sky News (SD and HD)
- Sky News Arabia (joint venture with Abu Dhabi Media Investment Corporation (ADMIC))

==== Sports ====
- Sky Sports Main Event (SD and HD)
- Sky Sports Premier League (SD and HD)
- Sky Sports Football
- Sky Sports Cricket
- Sky Sports Golf (SD and HD)
- Sky Sports F1
- Sky Sports Action
- Sky Sports Arena
- Sky Sports Darts
- Sky Sports Mix
- Sky Sports News (SD and HD)
- Sky Sports NFL
- Sky Sports Racing
- Sky Sports Tennis

==== Movies ====
- Sky Cinema Premiere
- Sky Cinema Select
- Sky Cinema Hits
- Sky Cinema Greats
- Sky Cinema Animation
- Sky Cinema Family
- Sky Cinema Action
- Sky Cinema Comedy
- Sky Cinema Thriller
- Sky Cinema Drama
- Sky Cinema Sci-Fi Horror

==== Kids ====
- Sky Kids
- Nickelodeon (joint venture with Paramount Global)
- NickToons (joint venture with Paramount Global)
- Nick Jr./Nick Jr. too (joint venture with Paramount Global)

Some other channels available on the Sky platform also carry Irish advertising, such as the channels provided by Channel 4.

=== Restrictions ===
Sky subscribers in Ireland have a different choice of channels compared subscribers in the UK, Germany, Austria and Italy. The standard Irish channels RTÉ One, RTÉ One +1, RTÉ2, RTÉ2 +1, RTÉjr, RTÉ News, TG4, Cúla4, Virgin Media One, Virgin Media Two, Virgin Media Three, Virgin Media Four and Oireachtas TV are available to all Irish subscribers. These channels are described in some Sky publications as "bonus channels".

These channels are free-to-air channels but encrypted to avoid being shown outside of Ireland and Northern Ireland (where applicable). The channels are included with the Sky Signature package and are also available unencrypted on Saorview and Saorsat, excluding Virgin Media channels, which are only available on Saorview.

The BBC provide a number of their channels on the Irish version of Sky's EPG. BBC One Northern Ireland, BBC Two Northern Ireland, BBC Three, BBC Four, CBBC and Cbeebies along with their HD variants are available on the EPG. Other BBC channels including BBC News, BBC Parliament and the BBC regions can be tuned in manually to all Sky boxes.

Channel 4 provide all of their entertainment channels except 4Seven and More 4+1 on Sky Ireland's EPG. Channel 4's The Box Plus Network's 4Music is available but their other channels (The Box, Kerrang!, Magic and Kiss are also not on the EPG in Ireland. As these are all free-to-air channels, they can be manually tuned.

Welsh-language station S4C was carried by Sky Ireland for many years where its rugby union broadcasts were popular despite the language barrier; it was removed from the EPG on 9 August 2018 due to rights issues.

ITV and the Channel 5 family of channels have to be added manually to Sky boxes in Ireland.

== Sky Ireland Broadband ==
In February 2013 Sky launched its broadband and telephone product in Ireland, and have made significant headway into the Irish market as one of the few providers offering 'triple play' (phone, broadband and digital TV) to the public. As Sky's broadband and phone services use the existing telephone network (LLU and non-LLU) and is widely available as a result. Sky Ireland offers fibre broadband using the network of former incumbent eir, in addition to SIRO, NBI and Virgin Media, with speeds of up to 5 Gbps as of April 2026.

As of 2024, Sky had a 15.4% market share of broadband subscriptions.

== See also ==
- Sky Group
- Sky UK
- Sky Deutschland
- Sky Italia
- Sky España
- Saorview
- RTÉ One
- RTÉ2
- RTÉ News
- Sky News Ireland
- TG4
- eir Sport 1
- eir Sport 2
- BBC One
- BBC Two
- List of television channels available in Ireland
