= Virgin Media Two =

Irish television channel

- Country: Ireland
- Network: Virgin Media Television

Programming
- Language: English
- Picture format: 1080i HDTV (downscaled to 16:9 576i for the SDTV feed)

Ownership
- Owner: Virgin Media Ireland
- Sister channels: Virgin Media One; Virgin Media Three; Virgin Media Four

History
- Launched: 30 March 2006
- Former names: Channel 6 (2006–2009); 3e (2009–2018)

Availability

Terrestrial
- Saorview: Channel 5

Streaming media
- Virgin TV Anywhere: Watch live (Ireland only)
- Virgin Media Play: Watch live (Ireland only)

HD logo since 30 August 2018

Virgin Media Two, is an Irish free-to-air television channel operated by Virgin Media Television (a subsidiary of Virgin Media Ireland).

== History ==
=== 2006–2009 ===
In August 2006, it was announced that a new television channel would start on terrestrial television in Ireland, catering to audiences similar to those of E4 and Paramount Comedy. Co-founder Michael Murphy wanted to compete against these two channels which, combined, were attracting €50 million in advertising to Ireland, as well as competing against terrestrial channels RTÉ Two and TV3 for viewers, under the grounds that some popular channels, such as Sky One, were tailored for British viewers, while Channel 6 was aiming at an Irish audience. The channel employed a staff of 22, while its programming was going to consist of a mix of music videos and hit TV series such as Sex and the City and Frasier; its launch was projected for late 2005 or early 2006. Channel 6 was launched on 30 March 2006, then operated by Kish Media's subsidiary Channel 6 Broadcasting Ltd. Kish Media was a consortium made up of Tullamore Beta Ltd (Windmill Lane Productions & Paul McGuinness (U2 manager); owners of TV3), the Barry family of Barry's Tea, and Gowan Group. In its infant stages, the channel's consortium invested €14 million to fund the project. It was anticipated that Channel 6 would launch further channels including a Channel 6+1 service and a music channel.

In 2008, Kish Media announced the channel was for sale. In July 2008, it was confirmed that TV3 had purchased Kish Media for €10 million. The channel continued to broadcast as Channel 6 for a further six months, when TV3 began to promote Channel 6 programming on its main channel.

The station's first managing director was Martin Drake, who left the company after just eight months, and after a period under interim CEO Mark Kellett, the channel's top job was taken by Managing Director Michael Murphy, who later left the channel when it was fully transferred to TV3 and integrated into the TV3 Group. In December 2008, TV3 confirmed it would to re-brand Channel 6 to 3e on 5 January 2009.

=== 2009–2016 ===
In 2009 Channel 6 was rebranded as 3e. In 2008, it was announced the channel was for sale. In July 2008, it was confirmed that TV3 had purchased the parent company, Kish Media, for €10 million. The channel continued to broadcast as Channel 6 for a further 6 months before it was re-branded as 3e. Prior to its relaunch TV3 began to promote Channel 6 programming on its main channel. Including the 2008 series of I'm A Celebrity Get Me Out of Here, which previously aired on TV3 and subsequently aired on 3e until 2014. Channel 6 Broadcasting Ltd remains a subsidiary of TV3 posting profits of 4million euro in 2015 and profits of 8 million euro in 2023.

In December 2008, TV3 confirmed it was to rebrand Channel 6 to 3e on 5 January 2009. The channel would use existing TV3 programming and provide TV3 audiences with a wider range of programming. 3e provides viewers with a mix of US and Australian acquisitions.

It is also used as a TV3 replay service featuring repeats of previously broadcast programs on TV3 such as Ireland AM, Xposé and Midday. It was reported on 24 July 2009; TV3 Group sought to change 3e's licensing from the Broadcasting Commission of Ireland.

On 29 July 2009, the Broadcasting Commission of Ireland announced that the 3e licence would be licensed under Section 34, rather than Sections 36 and 41, of the Broadcasting Act 2001. This means that 3e is no longer a separate cable and satellite service rather it will be covered by the main terms and conditions of the existing TV3 contract.

2010–present:
In November 2010, the TV3 Group confirmed 3e made financial losses, but returned to a profit in 2011.

From November 2010, 3e began to air in the majority of homes in Ireland as it became one of the test channels on Saorview. By May 2012, the channel became available to 98% of homes in Ireland through Saorview and also available on other digital television providers.

3e was expected to receive a revamped on-air presentation in November 2014, but it appears that the transition has been either delayed or abandoned.

=== 2017 ===
On 9 January 2017, 3e was re-launched as part of a wider repositioning of TV3 Group's networks with the launch of be3. 3e was re-vamped as an entertainment-oriented network aimed towards viewers aged 15–44.

In June 2018, it was announced that 3e was rebranded as Virgin Media Two on 30 August 2018, as part of a rebranding of all three TV3 channels under the Virgin Media brand.

== Restructuring ==
With the announcement that TV3 Group would operate the channel. It was confirmed in December 2008 that TV3 had decided not to recommission the majority of Channel 6's homegrown programming which included Night Shift which had a cult following. The controversial move to cancel the series was reported in the media with major criticism from music journalists and music fans. Other shows which were cancelled with TV3's acquisition of Channel 6 included music shows Day Shift, Pop Scene, and Take 6, a weekly movie review show.

From 2009, TV3 began to use the channel as a replay service. In late 2010, 3e began producing its own programming which includes FYI (previously 3e News) and Uploaded. FYI was subsequently dropped in favour or TV3 News at 8, with bulletins replaced by The Thread.

3e was made available on Sky Ireland in late 2009. Predecessor Channel 6 was not made available on Sky until 2007 due to a dispute between Kish Media and Sky. On 29 September 2009 TV3 Group and Sky Ireland confirmed that 3e would be moved to 105 its service having been on channel 182 (as Channel 6 and for some time as 3e) prior to this change.

== Broadcasting policy ==
As Channel 6 the service was aimed at the 15 to 35 year old demographic. It aired many new US programmes exclusively on the channel with a number of popular re-runs. The channel also re-introduced Music TV back into the Irish market, and successfully return an alternative music programme to Irish TV following the axing of No Disco (RTÉ2) and Pop3 (TV3). The decision by TV3 to drop Night Shift in 2009 was picked up by alternative music magazine Hot Press and many in the Irish music industry.

As 3e, TV3 replaced most of Channel 6's homegrown programmes with repeats of Daytime TV from TV3, which it has dropped most of Channel 6 US first runs with US repeats with only Family Guy, American Dad and The Cleveland Show airing first runs.

3e uses the existing staff at TV3 (200 employees) to operate the channel. The channel airs a stripped schedule with very little original programme from any country. Much of 3e's news programmes were dropped in 2015.

=== Viewing figures ===
TV3 Group reported on 12 November 2009 that 3e's viewing figures had increased since moving to Sky 105. Its audience share increased by 25% from 0.9% to 1.1% – this brought the channel back to the audience figures received by Channel 6 at the end of 2008. As of 2010, 3e has increased its viewing figures through an increase in live sports. In May 2015 3e had 2.5% of the TV viewing audience.

=== Budget ===
In 2010, 3e's parent company recorded losses at the station during 2009. A pre-tax loss of €5million was reported to the Irish Company Registrars Office (CRO). Kish Media will not look to recoup their €14.5million investment until such time as the channel begins to make profits and when all liabilities at the station are paid as they fall due. It is expected that the channel will move into profit in 2010, however the downturn in the Irish market and falling advertising rates did cause the channel problems during 2009. Revenue was down in 2008 from 2007, while expenses during 2008 had been reduced slightly.

== Programming ==
In 2009, several rearrangements of the 3e schedule occurred. These included showing repeats of Xpose and Emmerdale straight after TV3, followed by putting Xpose on at 17:30 instead of 18:30 and removing repeat showings of Emmerdale and replacing them with repeat showings of Coronation Street. Each of the changes failed to ignite 3e audience share, at first a small drop was seen. Xpose was returned to 18:30, while a Coronation Street omnibus was on a Sunday afternoon, however ultimately both ITV soaps were dropped from the 3e schedule.

=== 3Kids ===
On 27 June 2016, 3e began to broadcast a kids programming block titled 3Kids. The programming block airs seven days a week from 07:00 to 10:00, which features shows such as Barney & Friends, Origanimals, Teletubbies, Ghosts of Time, The Wiggles, Stella and Sam, Winx Club, and Babar and the Adventures of Badou among others.

From Monday 9 January 2017, 3Kids moved to sister channel Be3. This was part of a major TV3 rebrand.

Since 30 August 2018 when be3 became Virgin Media Three, the 3Kids branding has not been used. However, children's shows were broadcast from 07:00-09:00 daily on Virgin Media Three and was branded as Virgin Media Kids.

The programming block was later quietly discontinued on 18 September 2021 when Teletubbies was removed from the Virgin Media Three schedule, as such and since then, Virgin Media Television now no longer broadcasts any kids programming.

=== Homegrown ===
Channel 6 produced several shows to compete with both RTÉ2's and TV3's youth orientated programming, such as, Cois Farraige an Irish surfing and surf culture show hosted by Jenny Buckley, Access Hollywood also hosted by Jenny Buckley, Day Shift a weekend morning music show, Game On a video games show, Night Shift a late night interactive music show hosted by Michelle Doherty, Quiz 6 a phone-in quiz show, where viewers could answer on screen puzzles to win cash and Take Six a movie show hosted by Taragh Loughrey Grant who was later replaced by Elsa Jones, Sean Munsanje and Serena Bellissimo. Channel 6 had cancelled all but Day Shift, Night Shift, Pop Scene and Take 6 by the time TV3 had bought the station. TV3 cancelled all of the remaining Channel 6 programmes as it re-branded the channel as 3e.

With the launch of 3e the Channel 6 programming was replaced by repeats of TV3's XposéXTRA and The Holiday Show. Towards the end of 2009 TV3 began to produce more programming Xccelerate a weekly motoring show for 3e, produced by City Productions for TV3.

In 2010 TV3 started to repeat its morning and daytime shows to the channel as repeats. Ireland AM is repeated on 3e each morning at 10:15, The Morning Show is repeated the following morning on 3e at 09:25 and Midday is repeated the following morning on 3e at 08:35. This continued with the introduction of TV3 daytime shows The Seven O'Clock Show, Saturday AM and Sunday AM.

Other Irish programming included Uploaded and Tallafornia Uncut which aired in 2012.

Since 2015 3e largely repeats homegrown programming from TV3, including Red Rock. Repeats of Red Rock moved to be3 as of 2017.

=== News and sport ===
As Channel 6 the channel provided no news and sport, and focused largely on home produced music and review programmes.

In 2015 3e dropped its main evening news, and only airs bulletins called The Thread. In September 2017 3e started providing 60 minute news update in the afternoons on 3e, at 13:00, 14:00, 15:00 and 16:00, this is coupled with news programming on both TV3 and be3.

Although designed as an entertainment channel, it started broadcasting news updates shortly after its rebrand to 3e in 2009. 3e News Update is a minute long news broadcast from TV3 News. 3e News Update was broadcast Monday to Friday at 18:59, 19:59, 20:59, and 21:59. The News Updates were presented by TV3 News presenters.

CEO of the TV3 Group David McRedmond revealed in an interview with Hot Press on Thursday 8 October 2009 that 3e would produce a new news programme targeting a demographic between 15 and 34 years of age. The show will air every evening and it is expected to start broadcasting at the end of October 2009, however the show's launch was put back until the end of November 2009.

3e News began broadcasting 23 November 2009 at 18:00. It broadcasts Monday to Friday each week. The main news anchor is Caroline Twohig, The sports anchor is Paul Walsh and the cyber reporter is Cassie Stokes. 3e News renamed as FYI(Fresh Young Independent) from 10 March 2010. The show's presenters remain on in their current roles and the format of an Interactive news aimed at the 15 to 35 year old age group remains. 3e News Update was replaced with FYI. Update at 7:58, FYI. Online at 8:58 and FYI. Download at 9:58.

In July 2014 it was announced that 3e was to drop FYI to be replaced by a 60-second news similar to the original TV3 News Update that aired on the channel, the news update will be called The Thread in reference to their new on-line blogging service .

In March 2015, 3e aired 5 nights of specialist topics as part of Debate Week the shows were produced in association with IADT.

From September 2009 TV3 Sport has provided live coverage of the UEFA Europa League (formerly the UEFA Cup) on 3e, the Irish rights for which TV3 shares with Setanta Ireland. BT Sport took these rights from 2015.

In 2014 TV3 agreed a deal with UFC to broadcast the UFC: Dublin Fight Night on 19 July 2014. The fight between Irishman Conor McGregor and Diego Brandão, is the first UFC fight to be broadcast by an Irish FTA TV service.

3e provided extra coverage to the Rugby World Cup 2015 as part of TV3 rights agreement for the tournament.

A deal was struck with the Football Association of Ireland to broadcast live League of Ireland games in 2024. Weekly Friday night fixtures are bookended with pre and post match analysis with an in-studio panel.

=== Acquisitions ===
==== 2006 – 2009 ====
When Channel 6 launched the channel offered Irish viewers programming previously unavailable on other Irish channels these included: Heroes, House, Rachael Ray, My Name Is Earl, American Dad!, Dexter, Family Guy and The Closer. The channel began to air repeats of other high profiled shows which previously broadcast on other Irish channels these included: CSI, Frasier, Friends, Sex and the City, Scrubs, The Sopranos, Swingtown and The Wire.

==== 2009 – 2016 ====
When the TV3 Group re-branded 3e as a successor to Channel 6, many existing programming on TV3 began to air on the channel. One of the first major acquisitions for the channel was the agreement to broadcast ABC's Jimmy Kimmel Live! and The Middle. On 15 November 2010, 3e replaced Jimmy Kimmel Live with TBS's Conan.

TV3 Group signed an agreement with HBO to air the first season of In Treatment. It also began to air episodes of Glee which has its first showing every Friday night at 21:00 on 3e before TV3 on Wednesday night. Popular Fox animated comedies began to air on 3e such as The Cleveland Show, Futurama Family Guy and American Dad! and other Fox programmes such as America's Got Talent and American Idol and the US version of The X-Factor.

ITV programming began to air on the channel either as repeats or extended programming such as I'm a Celebrity...Get Me Out of Here!, Dancing on Ice, The X Factor, The Xtra Factor and Britain's Got Talent. 3e also simulcasted Five's reality TV series Don't Stop Believing in Summer 2010. Other British programmes include The Graham Norton Show, Fonejacker and The Only Way is Essex, which broadcast late night Friday and Saturday.

3e began to broadcast some popular Australian programmes these included Nine Network's Underbelly, Network Ten's Bondi Rescue and Seven Network's Nothing to Declare.

The critically acclaimed American comedies 30 Rock, Community, Hung and The Office US all air on the channel. The Seth MacFarlane animated comedies American Dad!, Family Guy and The Cleveland Show all air from 22:00 Monday to Friday. Weekend sitcoms include Accidentally on Purpose (which replaced repeats of Xposé in August 2011 Monday to Friday at 18:30) Better with You and The King of Queens air early evening at the weekend. Family comedies Everybody Hates Chris and Malcolm in the Middle broadcast during the daytime with alternating stripped schedules as one ends the other takes over. US family comedy Full House and Growing Pains aired at the weekend.

American detective franchises CSI: Crime Scene Investigation, CSI: Miami, NCIS, NCIS: Los Angeles and JAG are broadcast on the channel. Other US detective serials on the channel include Dexter, The Closer, Chuck, and House. American Sci-Fi and fantasy serials include Star Trek: Deep Space Nine, Kyle XY and V. Teen drama Degrassi: The Next Generation and Friday Night Lights are shown weekend mornings. Daytime chat shows include The Steve Wilkos Show and The Jeremy Kyle Show. Other shows include 3rd Rock from the Sun, The King of Queens and That '70s Show.

Programming includes U.S. imports such as The Big Bang Theory, CSI: Crime Scene Investigation, CSI: Miami, Family Guy, American Dad!, The Cleveland Show, Malcolm in the Middle, The Office (U.S.), Conan, House, The Steve Wilkos Show, Friends, Glee, The Middle and Modern Family. British imports include The Graham Norton Show, Take Me Out (UK), The Jeremy Kyle Show, The Xtra Factor, I'm a Celebrity...Get Me Out of Here! and I'm a Celebrity...Get Me Out of Here! NOW!.

As part of the 2012 autumn schedule 3e announced the following programmes as part of the line-up: Conan, American Idol, Family Guy, American Dad!, The Cleveland Show, Beavis and Butt-Head, Bob's Burgers, The Only Way Is Essex, Take Me Out, Britain's Got More Talent, The Jeremy Kyle Show USA, Nothing to Declare, Bondi Rescue and When Paddy Met Sally.

==== 2017-present ====
As part of the three channel partnership 3e will be home of daytime chat shows The Steve Wilkos Show and The Jeremy Kyle Show as well as Judge Rinder. Big Brother UK and Celebrity Big Brother also became exclusive to 3e.All repeat shows were moved to the new channel be3 including 3kids.

After being positioned as a youth-focused channel, As of 2024, Like Virgin Media Three and Virgin Media Four, Virgin Media Two airs programming from the ITV Studios library such as ITV game shows Tipping Point and The Chase, It also airs some programming from Bravo and E! such as Top Chef and The Real Housewives.

== Availability ==
At its launch in 2006 Channel 6 was only available on UPC Ireland on channel 106 and a few smaller cable services around the country. Later in 2008 it moved to Channel 182 on Sky, however it wanted to be further up the EPG. When TV3 bought the channel in 2008 an agreement was reached with Sky to move the channel to 105 a vacant position on Sky Ireland's EPG. Since 2011 3e has been available on Saorview. 3e was originally on Channel 6 on Saorview, TV3 later asked the BAI to instruct Saorview to move 3e to Channel 5, ahead of RTÉ News Now.

The channel is available to 98% of homes within Ireland through the national digital terrestrial television service Saorview. It is available to 80% of homes through digital cable and satellite service such as Virgin Media Ireland, Magnet Networks, Smartvision and Sky Ireland.

== Criticism ==
Many viewed Channel 6 as a much better service. Channel 6 had a wider variety of content and had introduced many new US first runs to Irish TV. While their Irish content was limited to in-studio music programming (Night Shift and Day Shift), many alternative Irish bands had been given the opportunity of appearing to a wider audience. TV3's decision to drop Channel 6's home produced programming caused an outcry from many in the music industry. As 3e and Virgin Media TWO, it has relied mainly on repeats of TV3 programming, US and English programming and many reality programmes, causing the content of the channel to be diminished.

== Branding ==
March 2006 – January 2009: Channel 6 launched its first set of identifiers (idents) in March 2006 and they remained on the channel up to its re-brand to 3e in January 2009. The presentation package was produced by Cleverality. There were several idents during this period. The 'blue dot' in the centre of the 6 would be transformed from a symbol representing entertainment into the 'blue dot'. Examples of those symbols include, the masks for drama and comedy, film reels, a television set etc.

January 2009–2015: When re-branded as 3e in January 2009, the new idents were made by Dublin-based Image Now. The 3e idents consists of the 'e' bouncing around the screen next to the '3', one is generic while the other one has the 'e' in flames trying to put them out. A third ident was added in October 2009 for use before soccer matches, it shows the 'e' kicking a football against the '3'. A fourth ident was added in October 2010, which features the 'e' slipping on a banana skin as a pie and rake hits it.

3e's Christmas idents were made in-house at TV3. Three idents were introduced 'Mistletoe', 'Snowballs' and 'Lights' The new idents were first show on Saturday 19 December 2009.

TV3 announced a student competition to re-brand the 3e logo, the new idents were expected to launch during I'm a Celebrity...Get Me Out of Here! in November 2014. The changes did not take place and the original set of 3e idents remain as of September 2015.

On 9 January 2017 3e refreshed the channels identity and logo making it a "fun" entertainment channel. Dublin based design company Emberlight developed 3e's new look.

== On-air identity ==
3e logo (2017–2018)

== See also ==
- Virgin Media One
- 3Kids
- Media of the Republic of Ireland
- List of Irish television channels
