= Virgin Media Ireland =

Irish telecommunications company

Virgin Media Ireland Limited
- Type: Private
- Industry: Telecommunications
- Founded: 12 December 2005; 20 years ago
- Headquarters: Macken House, 39/40 Mayor Street Upper, Dublin 1, D01 C9W8, Dublin, Ireland
- Area served: Ireland
- Key people: Tony Hanway (CEO)
- Products: Broadcast television; Cable television; Broadband Internet; Telephone; Mobile phone
- Revenue: $127Million for Q1
- Owner: Liberty Global
- Number of employees: 674
- Subsidiaries: Virgin Media Television
- Website: www.virginmedia.ie

Virgin Media Ireland is a telecommunications company based in Dublin, Ireland, providing broadband internet, television and mobile phone services. It is the largest digital cable television provider within the country.

Virgin Media Ireland traded under the name Chorus NTL and UPC Ireland until 5 October 2015. Its main competitors are Sky Ireland, Eir and Vodafone Ireland.

== History ==
Liberty Global and its predecessors UGC Europe and Tele-Communications Inc. have had shareholdings in Chorus Communications and its predecessor, Princes Holdings (Irish Multichannel), since the company's formation in the early 1990s. Originally a joint venture with Independent News and Media, IN&M sold its shares to Liberty in 2004.

In May 2005, NTL agreed to sell its Irish operations NTL Ireland (previously Cablelink) to Liberty Global. Morgan Stanley held the shareholding until Competition Authority approval was obtained. This occurred in December 2005 and UPC Ireland came into being on 12 December 2005.

In 2006, UPC Ireland began to integrate the brands Chorus and NTL to form Chorus NTL. Branding wise, on 5 September 2006 NTL's website was changed to the same design as Chorus i.e., itself based on UPC Netherlands' website design at the time. 25 January 2007, NTL Ireland updated the electronic programme guide software to remove the NTL logo and all mention of the NTL name.

On 31 January 2007, NTL and Chorus began advertising jointly, although the adverts were simply the ongoing campaign from NTL with the Chorus logo added to them. On 4 June 2007 @ntlworld.ie e-mail addresses switched to @upcmail.ie. The new UPC Mediabox set top boxes (STBs) which contain a hardrive based digital video recording system are fully UPC branded (albeit with the original UPC logo rather than the newer lowercase design) and come with a much enhanced EPG. These were rolled out on both the ex NTL and Chorus cable networks. From 2008, the old Pace STBs supplied by NTL Ireland (and originally designed for NTL UK) were replaced with new Pace STBs designed for UPC, also branded "UPC Mediabox" but without the hard drive/recording capabilities. In a Sunday Business Post article on 11 February 2007, UPC Ireland's marketing manager revealed that the rebrand was due to take place no later than May 2007. This deadline was missed. On 16 May 2007 UPC Netherlands introduced a new UPC logo, which was rolled out across UPC's European subsidiaries.

From July 2007, all UPC advertising began bearing a composite logo reading "Chorus NTL – a UPC company". On 10 June 2007 UPC announced its takeover of one of the remaining small Irish operators, Clane Cable Systems. This gained UPC an extra 2000 customers. During late September and early October 2007, Chorus and NTL included a leaflet with their bills explaining that a rebrand would occur on 21 October. That did not happen, however, on 30 October 2007, the NTL Ireland and Chorus websites were merged into a single website, although the composite Chorus NTL logo is used on it rather than the UPC logo. In November 2007, NTL Business was rebranded UPC Business, making it the first part of the company to officially adopt the UPC name.

On 29 April 2008 UPC's former Cork Communications cable network, latterly part of Chorus, became the first cable network in Ireland to switch to digital, with the analogue signal (except for the Irish terrestrial channels) switched off. On 4 May 2010 UPC began a €3 million spend on rebranding, completing the change from Chorus:NTL to UPC Ireland. A high-profile media campaign – fronted by broadcaster Craig Doyle – was planned to run for 3 months. It also lit up a number of buildings in Dublin (including Busáras and Boland's Mill), Galway and Cork. UPC had received the final approvals to acquire assets from broadband rival Broadworks, which was in liquidation. This would give it access to about 6,600 homes in west Dublin and Meath. The Competition Authority cleared the deal on 21 April 2010.

On 3 July 2015 it was announced that UPC Ireland had bought the TV3 Group for €80 million from Doughty Hanson, the deal may also deliver a further €7million should TV3 meet certain performance targets. The deal will need regulatory approval by Competition and Consumer Protection Commission as well as a media plurality test by the Department of Communications.

On 28 August 2015, it was announced that UPC Ireland would become Virgin Media Ireland, thus dropping the UPC brand and replaced by the Virgin brand. The name change took place on 5 October.

== Products ==
Virgin Media Ireland focuses on four key areas; cable television, broadband, mobile and telephone. The company offers broadband internet services using the EuroDOCSIS 3.0 standard as well as a VoIP-based telephone service using PacketCable. In addition, Virgin Media Ireland offers to business customers standard voice and internet services to more advanced services such as Ethernet LAN extensions, corporate voice services, and high-speed internet. These services are offered to large corporations, public organisations, and small to medium size businesses in Ireland, primarily in Cork, Dublin, Galway, Limerick, and Waterford.

=== Broadband ===
In May 2010, Virgin Media Ireland announced plans for a 100 Mbit/s broadband service which would be offered to home users across its broadband-capable network in the coming months. In December 2010 UPC launched its 100 Mb Fibre Power Broadband package, making it the fastest ISP for residential customers in Ireland at the time. In September 2012, UPC increased the maximum speed available to residential customers to 150 Mb, while increasing their entry-level speed to 50 Mb. Virgin Media now offer 500 Mbit/s, 1 Gbit/s and 2 Gbit/s speeds to residential users.

=== Mobile ===
Virgin Mobile launched in October 2015 as a mobile virtual network operator using Three's infrastructure. As of Q3 2020, the market share of Virgin Mobile in Ireland is 2.2%.

=== Television ===
The main product offered by Virgin Media Ireland is cable television services, in SD and HD digital formats, using DVB-C encrypted using Nagravision. Digital is now available in the vast majority of areas, with the Cork cable network becoming the first in Ireland to become digital-only.

On 14 August 2007, UPC launched a Personal Video Recorder, the UPC Mediabox, marketed as the Digital+ or Digital+HD Box in ex-NTL areas, subsequently rolled out to other areas.

On 5 August 2009 UPC launched its HDTV service in Ireland, which includes many international and regional television broadcasters.

In April 2013, UPC launched its Horizon TV service, which allows UPC customers to watch a selection of television channels from various internet enabled devices using their UPC broadband connection.

On 12 August 2013, UPC launched a Horizon HD+ set-top box. It offers HD as standard and consolidates all services (TV, broadband and home phone) into one device. It also allows customers to record four television programmes while watching a fifth.

=== On-Demand TV ===
On 25 May 2012 UPC Ireland launched its UPC On-Demand TV service in Ireland, with a full roll-out expected to be complete by September. A similar service had already been rolled out to UPC customers in the Netherlands, Hungary, Switzerland, Poland and Austria.

The service provides all customers with unlimited access to RTÉ Player and Virgin Media Player, with TG4 Player set to follow suit. Max package customers are also able to watch BBC, ITV and US box sets and additional content from the likes of Discovery Channel, Food Network, FX, History, MGM and True Movies. The video on demand service also allows customers in Ireland to watch classic movies and the latest cinematic releases.

=== Broadcasting ===
Virgin Media Ireland operates its own TV division, Virgin Media Television, based in Dublin. As of August 2022, it consists of four television channels:

Current channels:

- Virgin Media One
- Virgin Media Two
- Virgin Media Three
- Virgin Media Four

Former channels:

- Virgin Media More
- Virgin Media Sport

== Subscriptions ==
UPC Ireland Subscriptions
Date	Digital TV	Other TV	Broadband	Phone	Total	Unique Customers
2009	276,900	153,600	148,100	60,400	639,000	
2010	381,000		199,200		785,000	
2011	386,400		255,400		886,400	
2012	383,200	63,200	304,300	238,000	988,700	
2013	338,300	89,900	338,300	293,500	1,060,000	533,000

As of September 2019, Virgin has 26% of broadband subscriptions.
