= 2015 in Irish television =

The following is a list of events relating to television in Ireland from 2015.

== Events ==
=== January ===
- 1 January – UTV Ireland, the country's first new commercial broadcaster since the launch of TV3 in 1998, goes on air at 7.25pm. The opening night includes an hour-long episode of Emmerdale and a New Year special presented by Pat Kenny. The Station Promo Voice Was Paul Kennedy, he can be heard every day on Coolfm and Spirit radio The Graham Norton have moved from TV3 after UTV Ireland secured their broadcasting rights from its rival.
- 4 January – Charlie, a drama about the private life of former Taoiseach Charles Haughey, debuts on RTÉ One. The first episode is watched by an audience of 724,000.
- 5 January – RTÉ One begins We Need to Talk About Porn, a two-part documentary looking at the extent and impact of pornography consumption in Ireland.
- 5 January – UTV Ireland's national news service, Ireland Live, launches.
- 7 January – New soap Red Rock begins on TV3.
- 8 January – The Guarantee, Colin Murphy's film about the Irish banking crisis, receives its world television premiere on TV3 at 9.00 p.m.
- 10 January – New National Lottery game show hosted by Nicky Byrne, The Million Euro Challenge, starts on RTÉ One. The show is later cancelled after just one series.
- 12 January – Figures indicate that RTÉ broadcast the 20 most watched television programmes of 2014.
- 15 January – Figures indicate RTÉ broadcast the 20 most watched sports programmes of 2014.
- 18 January – The Sunday Independent reports that the decision by Sky and UPC Ireland to increase their prices may have had a negative impact on UTV Ireland's launch because price rises coincided with the launch. UPC's decision to allocate UTV Ireland the same channel formerly occupied by Northern Ireland's UTV may also be affecting the channel because some of the content available through UTV is not shown by its counterpart.
- 21 January – Sean Haughey, the son of the late Taoiseach Charles Haughey, criticises the portrayal of his father in RTÉ's drama Charlie.
- 27 January – The Broadcasting Authority of Ireland publishes a new code of programme standards designed to promote responsible broadcasting.
- 28 January – John Whelan, chair of the support group Advic, criticises TV3 for what he feels to be a juvenile press release about State Pathologist Marie Cassidy's appearance in an edition of the channel's The Restaurant. The press release begins by suggesting that Cassidy "hopes to knock 'em dead on TV3's 'The Restaurant'", which Whelan feels is inappropriate when her office deals with cases of murder and manslaughter.
- 28 January – In Cork, an edition of Vincent Browne's Peoples Debate descends into uproar when a member of the audience miss-chooses his words while discussing the upcoming same-sex marriage referendum, then goes into a rant about the morals of Ireland's political parties when his error is pointed out to him. Footage of the debate subsequently becomes popular on YouTube.
- 30 January – TV3 axes its afternoon show Late Lunch Live in favour of an evening chat show. The 7 O'Clock Show will air from 16 February, and will be presented by Late Lunch Live presenters Lucy Kennedy and Martin King.
- 30 January – UTV Ireland secures a deal with ITV to show Good Morning Britain after complaints from viewers who had watched the show on UTV via UPC. The programme had been absent from the platform since UTV Ireland's launch.

=== February ===
- 1 February – Stephen Fry appears as a guest on RTÉ One's religious affairs programme The Meaning of Life during which he makes controversial comments about God, of whom he says is "utterly evil, capricious and monstrous".
- 2 February – Good Morning Britain debuts on UTV Ireland, but viewing figures give it an average audience of 2,700, compared to 61,000 for TV3's Ireland AM.
- 4 February – Sky reports an increase of more than 200,000 customers in the UK and Ireland in the second half of 2014, its highest growth for nine years.
- 4 February – The National Lottery midweek draw is postponed until the following day because of a computer glitch that stopped the ticket machines working.
- 4 February – It is announced that Jeff Ford will leave his role as TV3's Director of Content in April to take up the position of General Manager at Fox International Channels UK.
- 4 February – Viewing figures for TV3's new soap Red Rock have halved from 323,000 to 165,000 during its first three weeks of broadcasting. However, TV3 remains pleased with the soap's performance, saying that its viewership has surpassed expectations.
- 4 February – TV3 presenter Sybil Mulcahy announces she is leaving the channel after 16 years.
- 5 February – RTÉ2 confirms it will air Eurovision's Greatest Hits, a concert celebrating 60 years of the Eurovision Song Contest, which will be shown throughout Europe over the Easter weekend.
- 9 February – Setanta Sports announces that it has gained exclusive live broadcasting rights to Champions League and Europa League football for three years from 2015 to 2016. However, RTÉ has retained the television and online rights to show Wednesday Champions League matches, while TV3 will show Tuesday Champions League matches.
- 9 February – A man who appears in the TV3 documentary series Prison Families is given a suspended sentence at Dublin's Circuit Criminal Court after his trial was told that a robbery and an attempted robbery he committed took place at the time of other offences, and should have been considered at a previous trial.
- 12 February – Viewing figures released by Tam Ireland and Nielsen indicate UTV Ireland had an average audience of 5.5% through January, with an episode of Coronation Street featuring a storyline involving a bus crash having the most number of viewers, with 597,000.
- 13 February – UTV Ireland announces its intention to air highlights of the Ireland cricket team's 2015 World Cup campaign, beginning with their opening match against the West Indies on 16 February.
- 14 February – Vodafone unveil plans to launch a TV service to compete with UPC, Sky and Eircom.
- 15 February – UTV Ireland considers a move for its 6.30pm bulletin of Ireland Live to take on TV3's TV3 News at 5.30pm because of poor viewing figures, which were as low as 2% for the first two weeks of January.
- 16 February – Laura Whitmore announces that she is leaving MTV News after seven years.
- 18 February – The BBC Northern Ireland current affairs series Spotlight wins "Scoop of the Year" at the Royal Television Society Awards for its programme A Woman Alone With The IRA, an investigation into how the IRA handled sexual abuse allegations against a suspected member.
- 18 February – UTV Ireland confirms it will be showing Carl Frampton's prize fight against Chris Avalos on 28 February after UPC viewers, whose access to UTV ended with the launch of its all-Ireland counterpart, expressed concerns it would not be available.
- 19 February – Taoiseach Enda Kenny uses Prime Time to submit to a rare live television interview but must wait as an episode of British soap opera EastEnders concludes.
- 20 February – Ryan Tubridy's tone and choice of questions when interviewing Anti-Austerity Alliance TD Paul Murphy in relation to the campaign against the implementation of a water tax on The Late Late Show is much criticised.
- 23 February – Undecided on whether to renew The Voice of Ireland for a fifth series, RTÉ are looking for an alternative to replace the programme for its Winter 2016 schedule. But after considering other options, the broadcaster announces in June that The Voice of Ireland will return for a fifth series in January 2016.
- 25 February – Paramount Pictures Ireland announce a collaboration with the Gaelic language television channel TG4 that will see The SpongeBob Movie: Sponge Out of Water made available in the Irish language in cinemas, the first collaboration of its kind.
- 26 February – The TV3 Group confirms plans to launch TV3 HD on both UPC Ireland and Sky Ireland in August.
- 26 February – TV3 confirms its intention to air all 48 matches from the 2015 Rugby World Cup.
- 27 February – Singer–songwriter Molly Sterling is selected to represent Ireland in the Eurovision Song Contest 2015 with the song "Playing with Numbers". Sterling, who at 17 is Ireland's youngest Eurovision entry, is knocked out of the contest during the second semi-final on 21 May.

=== March ===
- 1 March – The Sunday Independent reports that RTÉ and TV3 are allowing representatives of commercial brands to appear on daytime chat shows to sell their products as part of package deals ranging from €1,000 to €15,000 per appearance. The sale of "editorial airtime" is prohibited by the broadcasting regulations.
- 1 March – Writing in the Sunday Independent, GAA analyst and former All-Ireland winner Joe Brolly expresses his concern over the 2014 deal that allows Sky Sports to air some matches on a pay-per-view basis, saying that it "exemplifies the disregard for the lifeblood" of the GAA. However, speaking to RTÉ the following day, the new president of the Association, Aogán Ó Fearghail says that the deal has not hurt viewing figures and broadened the reach of Gaelic football by allowing it to be aired to a greater audience, but suggests that now there may be too many televised matches and the number may have to be reduced.
- 4 March – TV3's Red Rock tackles the issue of arranged marriage with the arrival of two Asian characters, a father and daughter in conflict over the topic.
- 4 March – RTÉ launches RTÉ Player International, an online service making the broadcaster's content available to international viewers.
- 5 March – As figures reveal that audience figures for UTV's Ireland Live dropped from 1.5 million in January to 1.3 million in February, Kevin Bakhurst, the managing director of news and current affairs at RTÉ, tells the Evening Herald UTV face a "hard slog" to improve their audience numbers.
- 5 March – John Martin, a member of the New Land League, says he will make an official complaint to Gardaí following a confrontation with broadcaster Vincent Browne outside a repossessed property in Killiney the previous day. Gorse Hill Manor has been occupied by the group since it was seized by the High Court. Brown was accompanied by a camera crew and journalists, and used footage of his visit on that evening's edition of his show, Tonight with Vincent Browne.
- 5 March – TV3 announces it is axing the live element of its entertainment series, Xposé, which will return to being pre-recorded. The decision will allow the broadcaster to develop The 7 O'Clock Show as a live show with a similar format to BBC One's The One Show.
- 7 March – The Irish Independent reports that the Commercial Court is to hear a case brought against TV3 by RTÉ for non-payment of transmission tariffs through 2013 and 2014. The tariffs relate to unpaid fees to 2RN, a subsidiary company of RTÉ that manages the transmission system. The case is scheduled for Monday 9 March.
- 7 March – A group of 150 protesters gather outside RTÉ's Donnybrook headquarters to demonstrate against their coverage of water protests and austerity measures.
- 8 March – The US drama American Crime debuts on RTÉ2, just three days after making its US television debut on ABC.
- 8 March – Mary McAleese narrates a documentary about the women's organisation Cumann na mBan on TG4.
- 9 March – At the Commercial Court, RTÉ is seeking €1m from TV3 for the non payment of digital transmission tariffs through 2013 and 2014.
- 10 March – In celebration of St Patrick's Day, UTV Ireland launches its "Bringing U Home" campaign, which encourages Irish people living overseas to submit greetings videos to friends and relatives, with entries having a chance to win return air tickets to Ireland from wherever they are currently living.
- 11 March – Analysis of All-Ireland matches from the past five seasons has indicated that Sky Sports succession as second provider of GAA games has had little impact on the majority of supporters as many county matches are not shown live.
- 14 March – Brendan O'Connor confirms that the current series of The Saturday Night Show will be the last. O'Connor will return with a new show in 2016, while Ray D'Arcy will present a replacement show for The Saturday Night Show from the autumn.
- 18 March – UTV Media confirms it expects UTV Ireland to report £6m in losses over 2015, double its original forecast. The company cites the length of time the channel took to receive its public service status as a major contributing factor, since it could not fully engage with advertisers and viewers until it was established.
- 18 March – TV3 will host two Irish Film and Television Awards ceremonies this year. The first in May will focus on film and television, while the second in October will award achievements in the television industry.
- 18 March – GAA USA, a four-part series presented by Dara Ó Cinnéide that tells the story of Gaelic football in the United States, debuts on TG4.
- 19 March – Lynda McQuaid is appointed Director of Content at TV3, replacing Jeff Ford.
- 20 March – Broadcaster Joe Duffy is making a television version of his popular radio programme, Liveline, a pilot of which will be aired by RTÉ over the summer.
- 22 March – The Sunday Times reports that TV3 believed the decision to grant UTV Ireland public service status was a "fait accompli" that had been decided weeks before its announcement as documents released under the Freedom of Information Act reveal the extent of TV3's objection to the decision.
- 22 March – RTÉ screens Ireland's 2015 Women's Six Nations Championship match against Scotland live from Cumbernauld. The game sees Ireland beat Scotland 37–3, meaning Ireland have secured both the 2015 Men's and Women's Six Nations titles.
- 24 March – TV3 announces the launch of its new nightly news programme, TV3 News at 8, a 30-minute bulletin showing at 8.00pm, following a similar format to nightly newscasts across Europe. The programme goes on air from Monday 30 March, and will be presented by Colette Fitzpatrick.
- 25 March – Speaking at a sitting of the Dáil, former Communications Minister Pat Rabbitte accuses RTÉ of being a "recruiting sergeant" for Sinn Féin and the far left because of its coverage of the Irish Water controversy. The comments are rejected by the broadcaster and Sinn Féin.
- 26 March – BBC Director-General Tony Hall signs a deal with Northern Ireland Screen which will see an increase in network spending in Northern Ireland. The agreement will also enable an extra £200,000 a year to be invested in drama development, and a £2m annual investment in children's content.
- 27 March – TV3 has announced the establishment of a strategic distribution partnership with Sky Vision, which will see its content distributed on the international market.
- 29 March – Minister for Communications Alex White will include the Six Nations Championship on a list of sporting events that must be made free-to-air on live terrestrial television, it is reported. White confirms to Cabinet his intention to add the coverage of the tournament to the free-to-air list two days later.
- 30 March – Sky Sports have secured the rights to Ireland's 2015 Rugby World Cup warm-up games against Scotland on 15 August, and Wales on 29 August.
- 30 March – Former RTÉ presenter Sheena Keane makes her return to television five years after leaving The Afternoon Show with a series on TV3 titled Get the Numbers, Write.
- 30 March – Following a case brought by three music companies, the High Court orders UPC Ireland, the country's second largest internet service provider, to take measures to stop the illegal downloading of content.
- 31 March – David McGovern, a fireman based in West Florida, is announced as the winner of UTV Ireland's "Bringing U Home" competition, and wins return tickets to visit his friends and relatives in Ireland.

=== April ===
- 1 April – In an April Fools' Day hoax RTÉ News reports the launch of Fur TV, a channel aimed specifically at pets. On TV3, Vincent Browne joins Glenda Gilson to present the channel's entertainment series Xposé.
- 2 April – RTÉ have issued a memorandum to their staff reminding them not to publicly express any opinions about the forthcoming 22 May referendum during the campaign period, including via posts on social media, it is reported.
- 2 April – SIPTU general secretary Jack O'Connor walks off the set of TV3's Tonight with Vincent Browne following a heated argument with Brown. O'Connor exited the studio because he believed his presence legitimised TV3's policy of not respecting the rights of its staff in collective bargaining, but Browne described the union leader's actions as a "stroke".
- 3 April – Pat Cowap, the director of RTÉ's soon to end The Saturday Night Show, is recruited by UTV Ireland to work on Pat Kenny's new show In The Round, which begins filming shortly.
- 3 April – Eurovision's Greatest Hits airs on RTÉ2.
- 4 April – RTÉ One arts programme The Works is to be "reformatted" as part of RTÉ's autumn schedule, the broadcaster announces.
- 4 April – Shane Richie and Jessie Wallace, who play EastEnders couple Alfie and Kat Moon, are to film a six-part spin-off series as the characters which will be set in Ireland and air in 2016.
- 5 April – The mother of broadcaster Brendan Courtney voices her support for marriage equality in a series of online videos.
- 5 April – Irish television premiere of the War of Independence film A Nightingale Falling, which airs on UTV Ireland at 10.00pm.
- 5 April – TG4 airs Louise Ni Fhiannachta's award-winning short film Rúbaí, a drama about an atheist girl who refuses to take part in her First Holy Communion.
- 6 April – RTÉ's Road to the Rising, an event marking the anniversary of the Easter Rising, is held in Dublin's O'Connell Street. The occasion includes a screening of Insurrection, the broadcaster's eight-part drama that was commissioned for the Easter Rising's 50th anniversary in 1966.
- 7 April – The Irish Language Broadcast Fund announces its latest round of funding for television and film projects, which includes finance for Piobairí Ard Mhacha, a series for BBC Northern Ireland about the Armagh Pipers, and Lomax in Éirinn: The Album That Saved Irish Music, a series about the field collectors of folk music Alan Lomax for TG4.
- 8 April – Viewers are invited to apply for tickets for Pat Kenny In The Round, which goes on air in May.
- 8 April – TV3 Group announce that the timeshift channel TV3 +1 is launching on Sky Channel 117 after they agreed a deal with Sky to carry the channel.
- 9 April – The Unemployables, which aired as a pilot in 2014, returns to RTÉ2 for a full series. The programme sees Darren Kennedy and Jennifer Maguire helping young unemployed people to find work.
- 9 April – French international distributor, Lagardère Entertainment has secured a deal to distribute TG4's Gaelic language thriller, An Bronntanas on the international market.
- 9 April – The first edition of Pat Kenny in the Round is filmed at Dublin's Mansion House. The programme takes the form of a one-hour interview with a notable figure, with the first guest being Canadian astronaut Chris Hadfield. It is the first in a series of thirteen interviews, though an airdate for the series is yet to be confirmed.
- 12 April – An article in the Sunday Independent highlights some of the shows that ceased being available to many Irish television viewers following the launch of UTV Ireland. They include ITV's News at Ten and Championship League football coverage, both of which have been replaced with homegrown programmes, as well as dramas such as Foyle's War and Arthur & George.
- 15 April – Debut of Wild Ireland, a six-part series presented by Christine Bleakley in which she travels the Wild Atlantic Way, the longest continuous coastal route.
- 15 April – Islanders, a four-part series looking at life in the island communities on the Irish coast, debuts on TV3.
- 16 April – It is reported that a number of private equity groups, including The Carlyle Group, have held preliminary discussions with TV3's owners, Doughty Hanson about a possible takeover.
- 16 April – TV3 begins airing Paramedics, a six-part documentary looking at the work of Ireland's emergency medical service.
- 20 April – Premiere of Dáil on the Dole, a four-part TV3 series that sees TDs spending time with constituents on social welfare in order to gain insight into the issues affecting them.
- 21 April – Minister of Communications Alex White confirms that the TV licence will not be replaced by a public service broadcasting charge until there is "public understanding and support" for the change.
- 24 April – A University College Dublin medical student who punched TV3 cameraman Ronan Quinlan in an unprovoked attack at a Dublin bar in August 2014 has his case adjourned for 12 months by a judge at Dublin District Court, and is warned that he must not come to the attention of the Garda during that time.
- 24 April – UTV Ireland have signed Lorraine Keane to do a one-off interview with singer Josh Groban on 3 May, it is reported.
- 26 April – The Sunday Independent reports that TV3 have signed a deal with Endemol to air Big Brother, the first time the franchise has aired on an Irish television channel.
- 26 April – Patrick Donoghue wins the fourth series of The Voice of Ireland.
- 27 April – Taoiseach Enda Kenny says that he will not take part in a televised debate on the marriage referendum as he launches Fine Gael's campaign for a Yes vote.
- 28 April – Caroline Morahan is to star in Fir Bolg, a new bilingual drama to air on TG4.
- 30 April – It is reported that businessman Denis O'Brien is seeking an injunction to stop RTÉ airing a story about his private banking details. The case will be heard before the High Court on 1 May.
- 30 April – RTÉ announce that Henry Shefflin has signed up as a pundit on RTÉ2's The Sunday Game.

=== May ===
- 1 May – The High Court places a temporary injunction on the broadcast of an RTÉ story about businessman Denis O'Brien until 12 May, while a full hearing on the issue takes place.
- 1 May – After agreeing a deal with Endemol, TV3 announce they will broadcast Big Brother UK, the sixteenth series of which begins airing on TV3 and 3e from 12 May. The programme had been absent from Irish TV screens since 2011 when it moved to Channel 5, which is not licensed to broadcast in the Irish Republic.
- 1 May – The Late Late Show stages a debate on Marriage Equality ahead of the 22 May referendum on the issue.
- 1 May – The world's largest television, the 105-inch LG Ultra HD 5K UC9 TV, is unveiled at the Henry Street branch of Arnotts in Dublin, with a price tag of €82,599.
- 2 May – Music producer Louis Walsh tells the Daily Star that he is planning a talent show for Irish television following a similar format to Britain's Got Talent.
- 4 May – Pat Kenny tells RTÉ Guide that he may not have left the network had his current affairs series The Frontline not been cancelled.
- 5 May – RTÉ One's Prime Time features a marriage referendum debate between Justice Minister Frances Fitzgerald and Yes Equality's Noel Whelan and Grainne Healy for the Yes campaign, and David Quinn, John Waters and Eileen King of Mothers and Fathers Matter for the No campaign.
- 6 May – TV3's Tonight with Vincent Browne hosts a live studio debate on the upcoming marriage referendum.
- 7 May – BBC Sport NI announce their coverage of the 2015 North West 200 motorcycle race to be held later this month, which will air on radio and television across Northern Ireland, as well as online.
- 9 May – Figures released by UPC Ireland indicate the number of subscribers to the service has fallen from 422,700 to 386,500 over the past twelve months. The operator blames an increase in competition for the fall. However, its broadband business is faring better, with an increase from 348,300 to 365,800 subscribers over the same period.
- 10 May – RTÉ One airs a service of remembrance for the 40 children killed during the Easter Rising, which took place on 7 May at St Patrick's Parish Church, Ringsend, Dublin.
- 11 May – Pat Kenny in the Round debuts on UTV Ireland. The first show to be aired features an interview with Tyrone GAA manager Mickey Harte. The programme is well received by viewers, but is beaten in the ratings by RTÉ One's Claire Byrne Live, which features a debate on the upcoming marriage referendum between Simon Coveney TD for the Yes campaign and Senator Rónán Mullen for the No campaign. An average 150,000 tune in for Pat Kenny's show at 9.00pm, UTV Ireland's best figures to date for the 9.00pm timeslot and a 33% increase in viewership, while Claire Byrne's programme at 9.35 receives an average audience of 368,000.
- 11 May – Ireland Live's Alison Comyn chairs a marriage referendum debate from UTV Ireland's Cork studios, featuring representatives from Mothers and Fathers Matter, Yes Equality, Stand Up for Marriage and Labour LGBT.
- 11 May – TV3's Tonight with Vincent Browne features a live debate from the Headfort Arms Hotel in Kells. A man is seen falling over as Browne introduces the programme, prompting him to comment on the fact to much raucous laughter.
- 12 May – TV3 announces it will air the 2015 FA Cup Final on 30 May, bringing the FA Cup back to Irish terrestrial television after a 20-year absence.
- 12 May – UTV Ireland's news programme Ireland Live at 10 hosts a debate on the Age of Presidential Candidates Referendum (an issue also being decided by a referendum on 22 May) from its Dublin studios.
- 13 May – Taoiseach Enda Kenny appears as a guest on TV3's Ireland AM.
- 14 May – UTV Media adjusts UTV Ireland's expected loss for its first year on air to £8.5m (€11.82), almost three times the original forecast.
- 14 May – UTV Ireland announces it is moving its early evening edition of Ireland Live from 6.30pm to 5.30pm. The channel will also introduce hourly news updates during the day.
- 15 May – TV3's political editor Ursula Halligan comes out as gay in an Irish Times article, and declares her support for a Yes vote in the marriage referendum. Halligan steps aside from providing TV3's coverage of the referendum in the wake of her announcement in order to protect the channel's impartiality.
- 15 May – Comedian Oliver Callan is reminded of RTÉ's controversial policy on impartiality surrounding the marriage referendum after publicly backing a Yes vote.
- 15 May – Pinewood Studios announce the establishment of an Irish studio with the launch of Pinewood Productions Ireland Limited.
- 15 May – RTÉ and Pat Kenny dismiss rumours that Kenny was blocked from appearing on Ray D'Arcy's RTÉ radio show ahead of the launch of Pat Kenny in the Round.
- 16 May – The Irish Independent reports that Communications Minister Alex White is to replace Health Minister Leo Varadkar as the government representative in the final RTÉ marriage referendum debate after a row broke out between Fine Gael and the Labour Party about which of the coalition parties should be represented in the final debate, the government's place in the two previous debates having been taken by Fine Gael TDs.
- 18 May – Thejournal.ie reports that Fianna Fáil—currently the main opposition party—has written to RTÉ to complain about its exclusion from the majority of the broadcaster's marriage referendum debates. Sinn Féin have said they will also complain about their exclusion from the debates.
- 18 May – Communications Minister Alex White, who is to represent the government in the last of three marriage referendum debates, to be aired by RTÉ the following day, dismisses claims of government tension after RTÉ said that Health Minister Leo Varadkar, who is openly gay, had originally been lined up to appear. White goes head-to-head with Rónán Mullen on a Prime Time special presented by Miriam O'Callaghan, while Varadkar speaks for the Yes campaign opposite Patrick Treacy SC on the 18 May edition of Claire Byrne Live, the second edition of that programme to feature a marriage referendum debate.
- 18 May – UTV's Ireland Live at 10 hosts a debate on the Age of Presidential Candidates referendum from its Galway studios.
- 18 May – The second guest on Pat Kenny In the Round is Canadian astronaut Chris Hadfield. Figures later indicate the programme to have had an audience of 66,000, fewer than half the viewers who tuned into the previous week's opening edition. The show is beaten in the ratings for the 9.00pm timeslot by documentaries on both RTÉ One and TV3—Ireland and the Eurovision attracting a viewership of 351,800 for RTÉ One, and The Battle of Gorse Hill, a documentary about businessman Brian O'Donnell, securing an audience of 74,700 for TV3. An edition of Coronation Street preceding In the Round pulls in an audience of 416,000.
- 19 May – A second marriage referendum debate on Tonight with Vincent Browne features Fianna Fáil leader Micheál Martin and journalist John Waters. Waters also debates with Sinn Féin deputy leader Mary Lou McDonald on UTV's Ireland Live.
- 21 May – As part of the Broadcasting Authority of Ireland's code of practice relating to election coverage, a moratorium on the broadcast of news items that it is deemed could influence the decision of voters in the 22 May marriage referendum comes into effect at 2.00pm.
- 21 May – The High Court grants businessman Denis O'Brien an injunction against RTÉ preventing them from broadcasting a news story about his banking affairs with Irish Bank Resolution Corporation (IBRC). The report must now be redacted before the High Court rules on whether a revised version can be aired.
- 21 May – Charlie Murphy, Brian Gleeson and Sarah Greene will appear in a new RTÉ drama about the Easter Rising. Rebellion, a five-part television series produced by Zodiak Media Ireland, will air in 2016.
- 21 May – TV3 announce their coverage of the 2015 IFTA Film and Drama Awards, which will be held on 24 May. Caroline Morahan will present the Awards coverage itself, while Louise Duffy and Eoghan Doherty will present a special TV3 IFTA Film and Drama Awards programme on Monday 1 June.
- 22 May – UTV Ireland airs the second Pride of Ireland Awards, the ceremony having been held at Dublin's Mansion House three days earlier.
- 22 May – Ireland's national airline, Aer Lingus launches a new €2m television advertising campaign that aims to modernise its image.
- 23 May – Irish voters back a constitutional amendment allowing same-sex marriage. Vincent Browne presents TV3's coverage of the results of the previous day's marriage referendum in a special programme, Vincent Browne Live from the George, broadcast from Dublin's popular gay nightclub, The George. UTV Ireland provides live updates throughout the day, with a special edition of Ireland Live at 5.30pm. During RTÉ's coverage of proceedings, Senator Katherine Zappone proposes to her partner, Ann Louise Gilligan live on air. President Michael D. Higgins signs the Marriage Equality Bill into law in August.
- 23 May – The Voice of Ireland presenter Eoghan McDermott backtracks from a tweet he sent out shortly after 10.00pm the previous evening protesting at RTÉ's marriage referendum gagging order. McDermott says that he posted the tweet, which included the words "Fuck you RTÉ" because he was in a "heightened emotional state".
- 23 May – Sweden's Måns Zelmerlöw wins the 2015 Eurovision Song Contest with "Heroes".
- 24 May – Gaelic football pundit Joe Brolly is forced to make an on-air apology during RTÉ's The Sunday Game after describing the tactics of a team as being ugly, and comparable with the looks of RTÉ colleague Marty Morrissey.
- 25 May – UTV airs Pat Kenny's interview with Mickey Harte. The third edition of Pat Kenny in the Round to air on UTV Ireland features an interview with singer Lulu, and draws an audience of 95,000. The programme is aired against RTÉ's Crimecall, which is watched by 365,000 viewers.
- 27 May – Ryle Nugent, RTÉ's Group Head of Sport, issues a statement saying that he has spoken to Joe Brolly about "his ill-conceived attempt at humour [which was] inappropriate and extremely hurtful and had no place" in The Sunday Game. Nugent says that the matter is now closed.
- 28 May – A statement made to the Dáil by Independent TD Catherine Murphy concerning the relationship between media owner Denis O'Brien and IBRC cannot be broadcast by Irish media because of the present injunction against RTÉ. Murphy was allowed to speak on the matter because of the law of Parliamentary privilege that allows parliamentarians to speak on issues without threat of legal action, and the speech is broadcast by Oireachtas TV, which airs proceedings from the Oireachtas. In the wake of the incident, RTÉ announces that it will seek High Court permission to report the contents of Murphy's statement.
- 30 May – RTÉ announces plans for a €20,000 revamp of its daily Angelus slot, and will invite film makers to suggest new ideas for the 6.00pm broadcast.

=== June ===
- 1 June – Having taken over the broadcast rights from RTÉ, TV3 airs the 2015 Irish Film and Television Awards ceremony, which took place on 24 May. The ceremony is watched by an audience of 121,100, compared to 382,000 in 2014. TV3's coverage of the IFTAs is beaten in the ratings by an interview with Shane Filan on UTV's Pat Kenny in the Round, which draws a viewership of 143,000.
- 2 June – Following a legal challenge brought by RTÉ, the High Court rules that Ireland's media are free to report Catherine Murphy's Dáil statement about Denis O'Brien and IBRC, and any other comments made under the law of Parliamentary privilege. On 16 June it is reported that O'Brien has launched legal proceedings against the Irish government and the Dáil over Murphy's statement, which O'Brien's lawyers feel was a "breach of parliamentary privilege".
- 2 June – UTV Ireland announces Daniel and Majella's B&B Road Trip, a six-part series that will see singer Daniel O'Donnell and his wife, Majella, visiting bed and breakfast establishments around Ireland. Filming will begin in July. UTV Ireland's announcement of the show, scheduled to air in October, prompts a rush of applications from B&B owning fans eager to have the O'Donnells as their guests.
- 3 June – Justice Donald Binchy, the judge who granted an injunction against RTÉ over its Denis O'Brien story, publishes a redacted summary of his decision. He says the public is not entitled to know "every detail of the affairs and operation of IBRC", and because RTÉ had not proved the occurrence of any inappropriate activity by either party. Although the summary is redacted, it is less heavily so because of Catherine Murphy's statement in the Dáil, which put some of the information into the public domain.
- 4 June – TV3's soap Red Rock airs for the final time before taking a summer break. It will return on 2 September. The season finale ends with a dramatic cliffhanger as Garda Adrijan Kosos (played by Boyko Krastanov) is hit by a car after stopping a motorist. The episode is watched by an average audience of 183,000.
- 6 June – To celebrate the 150th anniversary of the birth of W. B. Yeats on 13 June, RTÉ announce a series of programmes about the poet across radio and television, including Maurice Sweeney's documentary WB Yeats: No Country for Old Men on RTÉ One on 8 June, and a Nationwide special from Sligo on 10 June.
- 8 June – Debut of Whiskey Business, a four-part TV3 series charting the Teeling family's attempt to revive the Teeling whiskey brand and establish Ireland's first new whiskey distillery in more than a century.
- 8 June – Daniel and Majella O'Donnell are guests on the final edition of Pat Kenny in the Round to air before the summer.
- 9 June – UTV Ireland announces that it has appointed Radio Kerry journalist Alison Nulty as its Southern Correspondent to be based at its Cork studios.
- 9 June – Independent News and Media dismisses rumours that it could buy TV3, with a spokesman describing the scenario as "highly unlikely".
- 12 June – RTÉ fails in its bid to overturn the injunction granted to Denis O'Brien preventing the broadcaster from reporting his financial relationship with IBRC. However, the injunction is to be amended to take into account developments since it was originally imposed.
- 12 June – The Irish Times reports that UPC owner Liberty Global are in talks to buy TV3 from Doughty Hanson.
- 12 June – Figures obtained by the Evening Herald indicate that UTV Ireland's news programme Ireland Live has had an average audience of 17,500 since moving to the 5.30pm slot, with the 10 June edition attracting a viewership as low as 7,000.
- 13 June – TV3 have scrapped plans to revive the dating game show Blind Date after previously buying the format from ITV, the Evening Herald reports. The decision comes shortly after Lucy Kennedy, who was to have hosted the show, gave an interview to Irish Tatler in which she spoke of her delight at being picked as the show's presenter and said filming would begin later in the year.
- 14 June – The Sunday Independent reports that Davy Stockbrokers have cut their profit forecasts for UTV Media as a result of the losses made by UTV Ireland, with predictions that the channel will not return a profit until 2018.
- 15 June – TV3 reaches an out-of-court settlement with RTÉ over €1m of unpaid fees for digital transmission services.
- 17 June – The High Court grants RTÉ permission to broadcast all but two paragraphs of its report about Denis O'Brien's banking relationship with IBRC.
- 19 June – UTV airs the annual Spirit of Northern Ireland Awards, an event celebrating ordinary people in Northern Ireland who have achieved extraordinary things.
- 21 June – Black Work, a three-part crime thriller starring Sheridan Smith, makes its Irish television debut on UTV Ireland.
- 22 June – UTV Ireland's flagship news programme, Ireland Live, hits a new low in terms of viewership with an audience of 4,700 for its 5.30pm broadcast. The channel comes in for criticism two days later from TV3's Director of Content, Lynda McQuaid, who accuses UTV of failing to hold on to viewers outside its broadcast of Coronation Street and Emmerdale, comments she makes at the launch of TV3's autumn schedule.
- 23 June – UTV's lenders agree to ease their borrowing terms after earnings for UTV Ireland were recently downgraded.
- 23 June – The Financial Times reports that Liberty Global are in talks to buy TV3.
- 28 June – UTV Ireland's Managing Director, Michael Wilson tells the Sunday Business Post that the channel is planning to rebrand in the coming months in an attempt to increase its audience share. Changes will include a new onscreen identity and a review of programme scheduling.
- 30 June – Big Brother contestant Jade Lynch guest presents TV3's Xposé.

=== July ===
- 2 July – Richard Burke, the former Roman Catholic Archbishop of Benin City, Nigeria, reaches an out of court settlement with RTÉ over its Mission to Prey documentary that he claimed had alleged him to be a paedophile.
- 3 July – US telecommunications giant Liberty Global, owners of UPC Ireland, secures a deal to buy TV3 from Doughty Hanson for €87m.
- 3 July – Debut of The Pulse, a three-minute weekly entertainment bulletin presented by Jenny Buckley for UTV Ireland. Within days UTV are forced to reject claims that the show was inspired by TV3's Xposé after critics note the similar colour schemes used on the sets of both programmes.
- 3 July – UTV Ireland airs Clerys: The Rise and Fall of an Irish Icon, a documentary about the sudden closure of the Clerys department store in Dublin's O'Connell Street, which closed on 12 June 2015 after trading since 1853.
- 4 July – Amid mounting speculation that Prime Time presenter Miriam O'Callaghan could run for the Irish Presidency in 2018, the Irish Independent reports that bosses at RTÉ are under pressure to reveal whether they have held discussions with the broadcaster about the "potential conflict of interest" such a move would create. RTÉ subsequently says that it has procedures in place to avoid a conflict of interest if such an instance were to arise.
- 9 July – Emma Murphy, a 26-year-old mother from Dublin whose online video in which she spoke about suffering domestic abuse at the hands of her partner went viral within hours of being posted, gives her first television interview to Elaine Crowley on TV3's Midday.
- 12 July – The Sunday Independent reports a forecast from UK investment firm Peel Hunt that UTV Ireland's continuing losses could force it into a merger with TV3 within a year.
- 16 July – TV3's coverage of the Big Brother final, won by Chloe Wilburn, is watched by 458,800 viewers, giving it an audience share of 15.96%.
- 16 July – RTÉ One airs an edition of Prime Time investigating a medical supplies company and its dealings with Dublin's St. Vincent's and Beacon Hospitals. On 21 July, Beacon Hospital confirms the resignation of an employee featured in the programme.
- 17 July – UTV Ireland debuts Friday Night Sport, a weekly 30 minute round-up of sporting news presented by Ger Gilroy, which airs after the 10.00pm edition of Ireland Live.
- 18 July – UTV Ireland airs Carl Frampton's IBF World Super Bantomweight title defence against Alejandro González Jr.
- 18 July – The Irish Independent reports that former model and Total Xposure contestant Ruth O'Neill, who left Ireland in 2010 to pursue a television presenting career in the United States, will return to present RTÉ's new entertainment series, Bounce.
- 19 July – Land Rover Ireland have paid TV3 €450,000 to be the channel's official sponsorship partner of the 2015 Rugby World Cup, the Sunday Independent reports.
- 21 July – UTV Ireland announces it will broadcast the Ernst & Young Entrepreneur of the Year Award, beginning in September.
- 23 July – TV3 begins rerunning the first season of Red Rock under the title Red Rock Rewind, airing it daily in hour-long episodes.
- 29 July – Sky reports an annual profit of £11.3bn for 2014–15, and have also reached 12 million customers in the UK and Ireland for the first time in the company's history.

=== August ===
- 4 August – Following the announcement of Eurosport's six-year deal with the International Olympic Committee allowing them to air the European broadcasting rights for the Olympic Games, TV3 are reported to be considering a bid for the free-to-air sub-licensing aspect of the deal. The IOC stipulates in the agreement, which runs from 2018 to 2024, that at least 200 hours of Olympics content should be made available free-to-air in each country.
- 6 August – TV3's Midday wins praise from its viewers after broadcaster Dil Wickremasinghe is seen breastfeeding her son live on air.
- 13 August – RTÉ One unveils its autumn schedule, which includes 53 new programmes covering documentaries, drama and entertainment. The line-up will see eleven hours of new drama for Sunday nights, including Clean Break, a four-part series written by Billy Roche, and Rebellion, a drama set against the backdrop of the Easter Uprising.
- 17 August – RTÉ's Comedy, Talent Development and Music department invite proposals for new material to air in peak-time slots on RTÉ One and RTÉ2 for late autumn and Christmas 2015. Applications must be received by 26 August.
- 17 August – Entertainer Adele King, better known as Twink, guest presents TV3's The 7 O'Clock Show alongside Lucy Kennedy while Kennedy's co-presenter, Martin King, is on holiday.
- 19 August – The Royal Television Society (RTS) announces the launch of an Awards for Northern Ireland, with the first ceremony due to be held to coincide with the Belfast Media Festival, which takes place annually in November.
- 23 August – Reports in the Belfast Telegraph and other Irish newspapers suggest that the UK-based ITV plc will make a takeover bid for Northern Ireland-based UTV Media. UTV confirms the following day that it is in "ongoing" talks with ITV to sell the television arm of its business.
- 24 August – Today FM presenters Ian Dempsey and Louise Duffy begin a week as guest presenters of TV3's The 7 O'Clock Show; it is the first time Dempsey, the one time presenter of Dempsey's Den has appeared on television for twenty years.
- 25 August – Figures obtained under Freedom of Information rules reveal that RTÉ spent €2 million on travel expenses for its staff in 2014, as well as €425,000 on wardrobe expenses over the same period.
- 28 August – UTV Media, the parent company of UTV Ireland, reports a 90% fall in pre-tax profits as costs at the new channel reach £12m.
- 28 August – Launch of the weekend version of TV3's Ireland AM. Saturday AM is presented by Anna Daly and Simon Delaney, while Sunday AM sees Daly co-presenting alongside Ivan Yates.
- 28 August – RTÉ confirms that Una Foden, Rachel Stevens, Bressie and Kian Egan will all return as coaches on the fifth series of The Voice of Ireland in January 2016.
- 28 August – UPC Ireland announces plans to rebrand as Virgin Media Ireland.

=== September ===
- 2 September – TV3 unveils its autumn schedule, which includes coverage of the 2015 Rugby World Cup. In a subsequent interview with the Evening Herald, Lynda McQuaid, the channel's director of content, reveals that TV3 have been working with US broadcaster NBC to produce shows for the international market.
- 2 September – Unveiling their autumn schedule, TV3 announce that it has signed Brian and Pippa Ormond as presenters. The announcement comes a day after Ormonde inadvertently revealed to RTÉ that he will present a new game show for TV3. Among the programming in the broadcaster's forthcoming schedule are two documentary series about the murders of Sophie Toscan du Plantier and Karen Buckley.
- 2 September – TV3 airs Marilyn Monroe: The Missing Evidence, a one-off documentary looking at some of the conspiracy theories surrounding the death of Marilyn Monroe.
- 2 September – TV3 reveals that it has signed former Liverpool and Scotland footballer Graeme Souness to join their Champions League analysis team.
- 4 September – Sky and RTÉ announce the signing of an agreement that will make more of RTÉ's content available on Sky's platform. It will also enable the addition of RTÉ One + 1 and RTÉ News Now to the Sky lineup.
- 6 September – UTV Ireland confirms that it has axed Pat Kenny's chat show In the Round, which was due to return for a second run in Autumn 2015, because of poor ratings. That series will no longer go ahead.
- 7 September – Recording of a debate for TV3's Tonight with Vincent Browne is halted when Gardaí are called to the venue to deal with jeering audience members and anti-water charge protestors. It is also alleged that a male member of the audience threatened a woman during the event, being held Clontarf Castle in Dublin Bay North because she applauded equality minister Aodhán Ó Ríordáin. TV3 subsequently announces that the chaotic scenes will be edited out of the debate, which is broadcast two days later.
- 10 September – IFTA confirms a three-year deal with Irish retailer Gala to sponsor the Irish Film and Television Awards.
- 11 September – Official launch of the IFTA Gala Television Awards, which will take place on 22 October at Dublin's Double Tree Hotel.
- 14 September – UTV Ireland launches a new on-screen branding featuring people such as farmers, tattoo artists and designers with the strapline "YOU TV". UTV hopes the new look will "reinvigorate" the brand.
- 18 September – UTV launches a new version of its UTV Player, allowing viewers to stream live content for the first time.
- 20 September – The final series of Downton Abbey debuts on ITV, but is absent from the schedules of UTV Ireland. Instead the series makes its Irish television debut two days later on TV3.
- 26 September – UTV Ireland presenter Jenny Buckley tells the Irish Daily Mirror that the channel plans to expand her entertainment show The Pulse to a 30-minute slot by the end of the year.
- 30 September – The Independent Broadcasters of Ireland, the body representing 34 of Ireland's independent radio stations calls for all public service broadcasting to be funded through the television licence fee.

=== October ===
- 4 October – Ireland's final group stage Rugby World Cup match against Italy draws an audience of 1.38 million. Of those watching the game, an average 956,600 do so on TV3, with figures peaking at 1.18 million, giving the channel its highest ever ratings.
- 5 October – Independent.ie reveals that broadcaster Chris Donoghue is to leave his job as co-anchor of UTV Ireland's nightly news programme, Ireland Live in December, less than a year after the channel's launch.
- 5 October – UTV Ireland hire broadcaster Alan Cantwell as a news editor.
- 8 October – Broadcaster Pat Kenny tells the Irish Sun of his shock the UTV Ireland cancelled his chat show, In the Round, claiming that he heard the news from its producers, Coco Television, rather than UTV itself.
- 11 October – TV3's coverage of the 2015 Rugby World Cup continues to break ratings records, with Ireland's match against France seen by an average 1.15 million viewers, peaking at 1.42 million. Figures suggest a total of 1.69 million tuned in to the game's coverage on TV3, which includes the game itself, as well as pre and post match analysis.
- 19 October – RTÉ announces that it will revamp its daily Angelus slot, introducing a new set of short films featuring ordinary Irish people pausing to reflect during the Angelus. There will also be a People's Angelus on Fridays where viewers will be invited to submit their own footage. RTÉ says the new look Angelus will give people "of all faiths and none some quiet space in a hectic day-to-day world".
- 19 October – ITV agrees a £100m deal with UTV Media plc to buy its television assets. UTV Media plans to rebrand its remaining assets, but ITV says it has no plans to rebrand UTV as ITV Northern Ireland.
- 22 October – Three weeks after being employed on a six-month maternity cover contract, broadcaster Alan Cantwell announces his intention to leave the position of late news editor at UTV Ireland to return to TV3, describing the latter as his "alma mater" which will provide him with more "security and certainty".
- 22 October – BBC Newsline's coverage of the death of the former First Minister of Northern Ireland, Ian Paisley is named Best News Programme at the Irish Film and Television Awards.
- 26 October – Following reports that the UTV Ireland flagship news bulletin, Ireland Live at 10, has an average audience of around 50,000, the Belfast Telegraph reports that the programme's anchor, Alison Comyn, has defended the broadcaster, telling the Irish Film and Television Awards, "viewing figures aren't what makes us".
- 26 October – Daniel and Majella's B&B Road Trip debuts on UTV Ireland, giving the channel their best viewing figures to date. The first episode of the programme is watched by an average of 322,000 on UTV Ireland, while it is seen by a further 192,000 on UTV. The series moves to RTÉ in 2016.
- 28 October – The Broadcasting Authority of Ireland (BAI) have rejected a complaint from a female viewer about an item on TV3's Ireland AM from February 2015 that featured a fake penis. The item, concerning contraception, included a demonstration of how to properly put on a condom, winning the show praise from viewers, and a single complaint that appropriate warnings had not been given before the segment. BAI found that at least three warnings were given before the piece was shown, making viewers fully aware of the nature of the content.

=== November ===
- 2 November – Daniel and Majella's B&B Road Trip, which is simulcast across Ireland on UTV Ireland and UTV respectively, draws an audience of almost half a million. In Northern Ireland, the programme achieves higher ratings than EastEnders, aired in the same timeslot on BBC One Northern Ireland. Daniel and Majella's B&B Road Trip attracts a peak audience of 197,000, while EastEnders picks up 191,000, and average viewership for the entire programmes also shoes Road Trip to be ahead in the ratings.
- 3 November – As part of the RTÉ Six One News presenter Sharon Ní Bheoláin interviews Web Summit co-founder Daire Hickey, but Ní Bheoláin's confrontational nature during the item attracts much criticism on social media.
- 3 November – TV3 presenter Alan Hughes propose to his long-term partner, Karl Broderick on the day's edition of Ireland AM.
- 4 November – TV3 announces that Brian Ormond and former Rose of Tralee Maria Walsh will presenter the 2015 TV3 Toy Show. The programme will be pre-recorded at the broadcaster's Sony HD studios, and air at 9.00pm on 20 November. TV3 decided to replace the 2014 presenters, Brian McFadden and Karen Koster, because Koster has limited her television work after returning to TV3 on a part-time basis following maternity leave, but the broadcaster is forced to reject claims that McFadden was deliberately axed: "We just wanted to go with someone new. He wasn't axed, we hadn't considered him for the role this year."
- 5 November – RTÉ announces RTÉ 1916, a series of programmes and events to mark the centenary of the Easter Uprising, which will feature drama, documentaries and street events about the events of 1916.
- 5 November – The inaugural Royal Television Society Northern Ireland Programme Awards are presented at The Mac in Belfast, with BBC Northern Ireland scooping five of the awards for Spotlight, Road, On The Air, Brave New World – New Zealand and Line of Duty.
- 6 November – UTV Media says that it expects to make £13m of losses for 2015, and blames speculation over the sale of its television assets as the reason. UTV had previously forecast an £11.5m loss for the year.
- 9 November – The Evening Herald reports that UTV Ireland have signed Lorraine Keane to present an entertainment show designed to replace Pat Kenny's In the Round, which was axed earlier in the year due to poor viewing figures.
- 11 November – TV3 announces that it has secured the broadcasting rights to the Six Nations Championship from 2018 to 2021. The news comes as the channel's chief executive, David McRedmond defends the length of commercial breaks aired by TV3 during the Rugby World Cup while appearing as a guest on RTÉ Radio 1.
- 19 November – TV3 staff hold a fundraiser at The Green Isle Hotel in Dublin to raise money for the ongoing medical care of student Clodagh Cogley, who was badly injured in the Berkeley balcony collapse earlier this year. Clodagh, the daughter of Niall Cogley, group director of broadcasting at TV3, suffered a spinal cord injury during the incident.
- 20 November – Irish television premier of Adele Live in London, which airs at 8.30pm on RTÉ2. The show, which sees singer Adele speaking to Graham Norton about her new album, 25 and other aspects of her career, is simulcast with BBC One, where it has a different title.
- 27 November – The website businesspost.ie reports that David McRedmond is to leave his job as chief executive of TV3 by the end of the year. McRedmand confirms his intention to step down from the role during a meeting with TV3 staff on 7 December.

=== December ===
- 1 December – Shareholders approve the £100 million sale of UTV Media's television business to ITV.
- 2 December – RTÉ's Christmas lineup will include two special episodes of Mrs. Brown's Boys, as well as in-depth portraits of singer Ed Sheeran, and Niall Horan of One Direction.
- 3 December – TV3 unveils its Christmas schedule, with highlights including a Christmas special of The Great Irish Bake-Off, the concluding episode of Downton Abbey, and The Queen of Ireland's Christmas Message featuring Panti giving her take on the year's events, while Red Rock will feature a storyline about the death of a prominent character. Highlights for the 2016 winter season include the return of Celebrity Big Brother and Doctor in the House.
- 4 December – RTÉ journalist Teresa Mannion makes a live broadcast reporting on the progress of Storm Desmond, during which she is seen being buffeted by gale-force winds and heavy rain. The footage quickly becomes popular viewing among internet users.
- 7 December – Virgin Media Ireland completes its acquisition of TV3.
- 10 December – Viewing figures for November indicate that UTV Ireland achieved its most successful month to date, capturing a 10.3% share of the audience between 6.30 pm and 11.30 pm, making it the second-most-watched channel in that timeslot during the month.
- 10 December – UTV Ireland confirms that it will not be working on any future projects with broadcaster Pat Kenny.
- 12 December – Tony Hanway, CEO of Virgin Media Ireland, hints that TV3 may expand its coverage area to broadcast in Northern Ireland.
- 13 December – The O'Brien Devine family from County Waterford, coached by Davy Fitzgerald, win season three of Ireland's Fittest Family.
- 19 December – Boxer Michael Conlan is named the 2015 RTÉ Sports Person of the Year.
- 22 December – The Broadcasting Authority of Ireland approves ITV's £100 million takeover of UTV plc, meaning the deal has cleared one of the first regulatory hurdles in the Republic.
- 29 December – Broadcaster Gay Byrne is taken to hospital after suffering a heart attack.
- 29 December – Viewing figures reveal that Mrs. Brown's Boys was once again the most watched programme over the festive period. Mammy's Christmas Punch, aired on Christmas Eve, was seen by 668,400 viewers (a 42% audience share), while Mrs. Brown's Boys D'Movie was the most watched programme on Christmas Day, attracting 591,300 viewers (a 38% share).

== Debuts ==
=== RTÉ ===
- 4 January – Charlie on RTÉ One (2015)
- 5 January – We Need to Talk About Porn on RTÉ One
- 10 January – The Million Euro Challenge on RTÉ One (cancelled after just one series)
- 26 January – Claire Byrne Live on RTÉ One
- 2 February – OCD and Me on RTÉ2
- 8 March – American Crime on RTÉ2 (2015–2017)
- 26 March – Home of the Year on RTÉ One
- 9 April – The Unemployables on RTÉ2
- 30 August – Ireland's Spelling Bee on RTÉ One
- 26 September – The Ray D'Arcy Show on RTÉ One (2015–present)

=== TV3 ===
- 7 January – The Restaurant (was previously shown by RTÉ)
- 7 January – Red Rock (2015–2020)
- 16 February – The 7 O'Clock Show (2015–2016)
- 30 March – TV3 News at 8 (2015–2016)
- 30 March – Get the Numbers, Write
- 15 April – Islanders
- 16 April – Paramedics
- 20 April – Dáil on the Dole
- 8 June – Whiskey Business (2015)

=== TG4 ===
- 8 January – GLEO
- 18 February – GAA USA
- 1 March – Busker Abú (2015)
- 23 April – Gairdíní na Lus
- 25 September – Breadwinners (2014–2016)
- Scaredy Squirrel (2011–2013)

=== UTV Ireland ===
- 5 January – Ireland Live
- 5 April – A Nightingale Falling
- 15 April – Wild Ireland
- 11 May – Pat Kenny in the Round
- 3 July – The Pulse
- 3 July – Clerys: The Rise and Fall of an Irish Icon
- 17 July – Friday Night Sport
- 26 October – Daniel and Majella's B&B Road Trip

== Ongoing television programmes ==
=== 1960s ===
- RTÉ News: Nine O'Clock (1961–present)
- RTÉ News: Six One (1962–present)
- The Late Late Show (1962–present)

=== 1970s ===
- The Late Late Toy Show (1975–present)
- The Sunday Game (1979–present)

=== 1980s ===
- Fair City (1989–present)
- RTÉ News: One O'Clock (1989–present)

=== 1990s ===
- Would You Believe (1990s–present)
- Winning Streak (1990–present)
- Prime Time (1992–present)
- Nuacht RTÉ (1995–present)
- Nuacht TG4 (1996–present)
- Ros na Rún (1996–present)
- TV3 News (1998–present)
- Ireland AM (1999–present)
- Telly Bingo (1999–present)

=== 2000s ===
- Nationwide (2000–present)
- TV3 News at 5.30 (2001–present) – now known as the 5.30
- Against the Head (2003–present)
- news2day (2003–present)
- Other Voices (2003–present)
- Saturday Night with Miriam (2005–present)
- The Week in Politics (2006–present)
- Tonight with Vincent Browne (2007–2017)
- Xposé (2007–2019)
- At Your Service (2008–present)
- Championship Live (2008–present) – Now rebranded as GAA on 3
- Midday (2008–2016)
- Operation Transformation (2008–present)
- 3e News (2009–present)
- Dragons' Den (2009–present)
- Republic of Telly (2009–2016)
- Two Tube (2009–present)

=== 2010s ===
- Jack Taylor (2010–present)
- Love/Hate (2010–present)
- Mrs. Brown's Boys (2011–present)
- The GAA Show (2011–present)
- MasterChef Ireland (2011–present)
- Irish Pictorial Weekly (2012–present)
- Today (2012–present)
- The Mario Rosenstock Show (2012–2016)
- The Voice of Ireland (2012–2016)
- The Works (2012–present)
- Deception (2013–present)
- The Fall (2013–2016)
- Celebrity MasterChef Ireland (2013–present)
- Second Captains Live (2013–present)

== Ending this year ==
- 6 February – Late Lunch Live (2013–2015)
- 30 May – The Saturday Night Show (2010–2015)
- Unknown date – Paul Connolly Investigates (2011–2015) and The Great Irish Bake Off (2013–2015)

== Deaths ==
- 9 February – Daphne Carroll, 91, actress
- 13 May – Derek Davis, 67, broadcaster
- 25 May – Bill O'Herlihy, 76, sports and current affairs broadcaster and public relations consultant.
- 5 June – Paolo Tullio, 65, Michelin Star-winning chef and resident food critic on The Restaurant
- 28 June – Liam Ó Murchú, 86, writer and broadcaster
- 9 July – Diarmuid Mac An Adhastair, 71, actor
- 31 December – Wesley Burrowes, 85, playwright, screenwriter and creator of Glenroe

== See also ==
- 2015 in Ireland
