= 2014 in Irish television =

The following is a list of events relating to television in Ireland from 2014.

== Events ==
=== January ===
- 6 January – TV3 announces the shortlist of production companies contending to make the broadcaster's first soap opera or continuing drama.
- 7 January – The Broadcasting Authority of Ireland (BAI) will not proceed with a licensing process for commercial digital terrestrial television, while a report commissioned by the regulator has suggested that without expansion, Saorview would become economically nonviable by the 2020s.
- 11 January – Ireland's Fittest Family, a six-part contest presented by Mairead Farrell in which 12 families compete against each other to be series champion, debuts on RTÉ One. The first season is won by the O'Reilly Family of County Cavan, who are coached by Nikki Symmons.
- 12 January – The Irish Independent reports that TV3 has sold Tallafornia to the UK's Channel 5 for broadcast in that country.
- 12 January – The Sunday Times reports that TV3 have "voiced grave concerns" to the Broadcasting Authority of Ireland about UTV's plans to establish a TV channel in the Republic of Ireland, amid concerns it would not be subject to the same obligations as RTÉ and TV3.
- 15 January – Ryanair launch their "thank you for flying" ad campaign on TV3, with plans to treble their advertising budget in 2014.
- 15 January – Dermot Horan is appointed Director of Production and Acquisitions at RTÉ. Michelle Spillane becomes Director of RTÉ Global.
- 19 January – Debut of RTÉ's four part crime drama, Amber. The series was filmed in 2011 and originally scheduled for broadcast in Autumn 2012, but postponed due to financial concerns.
- 26 January – Following Sky's introduction of personalised adverts in the UK, the Irish Independent reports that the broadcaster hopes to bring the technology to Ireland by 2015.
- 30 January – Figures from Television Audience Measurement Ireland indicate viewers in Ireland watched an average of 3.5 hours of television per day in 2013.
- 30 January – The Scottish Football Association agrees a new four-year deal with Sky Sports to show its matches in the UK and Ireland.
- 31 January – Figures from Sky show that over 3,000 viewers are accessing catch up services through Sky+HD on a weekly basis.

=== February ===
- 6 February – BAI confirms its intention to enter into negotiations with UTV Ireland Limited for a television content provision contract.
- 7 February – The Data Protection Commissioner launches an investigation after revelations that An Post has been making people disclose their bank account details if they wish to pay their television license by direct debit.
- 14 February – Figures released by UPC Ireland show an 11% growth in broadband subscribers to 338,300 over the past 12 months, but a 4% fall in its overall TV subscribers to 427,000.
- 22 February – RTÉ airs the Rugby Union match between the Irish women's team and England from Twickenham.
- 26 February – A third series of the BBC period crime drama Ripper Street, axed by the broadcaster in 2013, will be produced in Ireland by Amazon for its video on-demand service.
- 27 February – UTV Ireland signs a ten-year contract with BAI to provide a general entertainment channel based in Dublin that will go on air from 2015.

=== March ===
- 3 March – A technical glitch during RTÉ's Primetime current affairs show leads to a small portion of an interview with Maxim Peshkov, Russia's ambassador to Ireland, playing on a loop for several minutes. The phrase "Irish Ukrainians not Russians" is heard for around fifteen minutes, with the clip quickly becoming popular on Twitter.
- 3 March – TV3 names Ireland's Element Pictures and Britain's Company Pictures as its preferred partners in plans to launch a new soap.
- 4 March – John Yorke, a former executive producer of EastEnders, will oversee production of TV3's new soap, it is announced.
- 8 March – RTÉ creates a video tribute to former Irish rugby captain Brian O'Driscoll imagining how he might be remembered in forty years from now, as an old man recalls the player's career to his awestruck grandson.
- 27 March – Sky announce details of a scholarship for students taking the Broadcast Production MA offered by Dún Laoghaire Institute of Art, Design and Technology's National Film School. The Sky Academy TV Scholarship will be available from September.
- 31 March – Saorview customers will be unable to receive RTÉ One after today if they have not retuned their set-top boxes to receive technical upgrades for high-definition television.

=== April ===
- 1 April – The GAA announce a new three-year broadcasting rights deal that will see RTÉ air 31 games of the All-Ireland Championships, with a further 14 games being shown via subscription on Sky Sports. The decision will bring Gaelic football to a wider audience outside Ireland, but prompts concerns among fans and some players that the deal could lead to the game losing its amateur status.
- 2 April – RTÉ Two announces the launch of The RTÉ Two New Voices Award, in conjunction with the National Student Media Awards, which will give students an opportunity to compete for a summer work placement at the station.
- 15 April – TV3 secures the broadcasting rights for the 2015 Rugby World Cup.
- 27 April – Brendan McCahey wins the third series of The Voice of Ireland.
- 29 April – Mary Curtis is appointed as head of UTV Ireland.

=== May ===
- 1 May – Launch of Irish TV, a free-to-air international channel for the Irish diaspora, broadcasting in Ireland, Europe and the United States.
- 7 May – TV3 confirms its new soap will be set in a police precinct in a fictional harbour town, and has the working title Red Rock. It will employ around 100 people, and is expected to begin airing in January 2015. The series is part of a schedule that will see the channel spending more on home made content than imports for the first time, with it airing up to 100 hours of homegrown content per week. TV3 also have the broadcast rights for the 2015 series of The X Factor, Britain's Got Talent and Downton Abbey, as well as exclusive coverage of the 2015 Rugby World Cup. The channel also announces plans to produce an Irish version of the UK television series Gogglebox.
- 12 May – TV3 executives Daragh Byrne, Joanne King, Paula McCarthy, David McMunn and Daragh O’Halloran have been recruited by UTV Ireland, the new broadcaster has announced. They are among nine people recruited to senior positions at the upcoming channel.
- 21 May – RTÉ Gaelic football pundit Joe Brolly apologises to Sky Sports presenter Rachel Wyse after posting a tweet in which he described Sky's planned GAA coverage, which is to feature Wyse as a presenter, as "TV3 plus Baywatch babe".
- 24 May – The Irish Independent reports the dramatic departure of two producers from TV3's Tonight with Vincent Browne, an event occurring only days after the channel lost five of its senior executives.

=== June ===
- 4 June – RTÉ One airs the documentary The Torture Files which explores the treatment of the "Hooded Men" of Derry following their internment by the British Army in 1971.
- 5 June – TV3 airs the first Pride of Ireland Awards, an annual event launched to honour ordinary people who have acted bravely or extraordinarily in challenging situations. The event is held at Dublin's Mansion House and presented by Una Foden.
- 9 June – Broadcaster Vincent Browne reveals that he recently suffered a bout of pneumonia but continued to work during his illness. Details of his condition are disclosed following his absence from the evening's edition of his Tonight programme and reports that he had spent the previous weekend in hospital. Tonight with Vincent Browne is presented by Tom McGurk in Browne's absence.
- 9 June – Comedian David McSavage accuses RTÉ of "dictatorial" censorship after the broadcaster banned a comedy sketch featuring three nuns and a crucified Jesus that parodies a recent Diet Coke advert. The "Wild Nuns" sketch was due to form part of the fourth episode of the latest series of McSavage's comedy show The Savage Eye, but in an email to the comedian, RTÉ said it would not air the piece because they felt it could "very quickly generate the potential for justifiable offence from viewers of the Christian faith".
- 16 June – Minister for Communications, Energy and Natural Resources Pat Rabbitte announces a review of television coverage of the designated sporting and other events to determine what content should be free-to-air.
- 17 June – The Irish Independent reports that Republic of Telly presenter Jennifer Maguire will front a programme as part of RTÉ Two's Reality Bites strand in which she will help young unemployed people find work. The Unemployables will air in the autumn and see her teaming up with Darren Kennedy with whom she co-devised the series format.
- 19 June – UTV Ireland unveils its new logo at a press conference in Dublin's Croke Park.

=== July ===
- 3 July – Tracy Coyne wins series two of TV3's The Great Irish Bake Off.
- 8 July – The cabinet approves plans to crack down on television licence evaders by giving inspectors the power to cross reference cable and satellite subscription bills with television licence records. However, UPC Ireland says that as the law currently stands it will not hand over details of its customers.
- 11 July – Alex White is appointed as Communications Minister in a cabinet reshuffle, replacing Pat Rabbitte.
- 13 July – Veteran RTÉ Sportscaster Bill O'Herlihy presents his final sports broadcast for the network after 50 years, with coverage of the 2014 FIFA World Cup Final.
- 13 July – The Sunday Independent reports that viewing figures for RTÉ Two have reached an all-time low. Having fallen by a fifth last year, the monthly viewing average in 2013 was 40,600, or a 7.2% audience share.
- 16 July – TV3 announces the establishment of a Public Affairs Documentary Unit, and that its Wednesday night current affairs programme Midweek is being axed to make way for programmes produced by the new department. A current affairs series similar to RTÉ's Primetime is also planned for 2015.
- 17 July – TG4 begins broadcasting its content in the United States via the Today's Ireland channel.
- 23 July – TG4 announce the appointment of three new weather presenters—Irial Ó Ceallaigh, Fiona Ní Fhlaithearta and Caitlín Nic Aoidh—who were selected following a public competition.
- 31 July – The Evening Herald reports that RTÉ has commissioned a documentary about pornography to be aired as part of its autumn schedule. The two-part documentary, We Need to Talk About Porn, airs on RTÉ One in January 2015.

=== August ===
- 3 August – The Sunday Independent reports that advertising agencies are frustrated by the lack of information about UTV Ireland, which is producing a lack of enthusiasm about advertising on the new channel.
- 5 August – TV3 announce that casting will shortly begin for its new soap, Red Rock.
- 6 August – Setanta Sports launches its 2014–15 Premier League coverage with an offer to new subscribers to sign up for just €1 a month.
- 6 August – The Irish Independent reports that the introduction of the Public Service Broadcasting Charge, scheduled to begin on 1 January 2015, will be delayed to avoid clashes with new water charges due to be introduced in 2015.
- 15 August – The Broadcasting Authority of Ireland rules that TV3 "did not show due care" to the mother of a man responsible for a 2009 murder-suicide in Bray, County Wicklow, about which it made a documentary. A Search for Justice: Death in Bray was aired by the channel on 10 March.
- 17 August – UTV Ireland announces that it has signed Alison Comyn to anchor its news bulletins.
- 19 August – UTV Ireland has signed Pat Kenny to present a weekly show on the channel, it is announced.
- 20 August – TV3 has retained the broadcast rights for The X Factor.
- 20 August – Veteran broadcaster Gay Byrne expresses his concern that the 2015 arrival of UTV Ireland has the potential to threaten the future of TV3.
- 27 August – Adam Weafer, Jane McGrath and Paul Roe are confirmed as the first three cast members of Red Rock.

=== September ===
- 4 September – Speaking to The Evening Herald's Laura Butler, TV3 boss Jeff Ford outlines the channel's strategy for competing with UTV Ireland when it launches next year. This includes a greater emphasis on homegrown content, including Red Rock, a soap set in a Garda station, and an Irish version of Blind Date, fronted by Lucy Kennedy.
- 8 September – TV3's entertainment series, Xposé, unveils a new studio set as it begins airing live. Previously pre-recorded, the show has been extended to an hour in length with an interactive element, and will follow a similar format to the US entertainment series, E! News. The programme is co-presented by Peter O'Riordan and Karen Koster.
- 11 September – RTÉ Two reveals its new schedule, and confirms a rebranding back to its original name of 'RTÉ 2'.
- 16 September – The Broadcasting Authority of Ireland awards €800,000 of funding to TV3's new soap, Red Rock, as part of its Sound and Vision scheme.
- 18 September – Former Ireland international rugby union player Keith Wood has been signed up by TV3 to join its coverage of the 2015 Rugby World Cup.
- 19 September – Controversial media personality Katie Hopkins appears as a guest on The Late Late Show in which she criticises fat people, and clashes with Irish Independent journalist Andrea Smith who recently wrote about being unconcerned with her large size.
- 22 September – RTÉ2's rebranding takes effect. New programming includes a revamped news programme, News Feed, presented by Carla O'Brien.
- 24 September – Vincent Browne apologises to viewers after making a joke about beheadings during a discussion with guests on his Tonight show.

=== October ===
- 6 October – Una Foden and Rachel Stevens are confirmed as coaches on The Voice of Ireland, replacing Jamelia and Dolores O'Riordan when the series returns in January 2015.
- 10 October – TV3 confirms that its news presenter Claire Brock will move to UTV Ireland after she was signed up by the broadcaster.
- 13 October – TV3 announce a rival to RTÉ One's The Late Late Toy Show which will broadcast live from the RDS on 21 November.
- 14 October – RTÉ News announce plans to appoint a new London correspondent, reversing their much-criticised decision of September 2012 to close their London offices.
- 17 October – UTV Ireland has appointed RTÉ broadcaster Paul Colgan as its Economics Editor.
- 21 October – UTV Ireland confirms that Newstalk breakfast show presenter Chris Donoghue has been signed up to anchor news bulletins for the channel alongside Alison Comyn.
- 23 October – Former RTÉ radio and television presenter Jenny Huston, who left broadcasting and retrained as a gemologist and jewellery designer, is launching her debut line Edge Only, the Irish Independent reports.
- 23 October – The Irish language drama An Bronntanas debuts on TG4.
- 30 October – The Guarantee, a film exploring the Irish banking crisis, debuts in Irish cinemas. It is produced by John Kelleher Media in association with the BAI, the Irish Film Board and TV3.

=== November ===
- 2 November – The Kingston family from County Cork, coached by Derval O'Rourke, win season two of Ireland's Fittest Family.
- 3 November – Production begins on TV3's new soap, Red Rock. The full cast is also unveiled, with Richard Flood taking the lead role as Garda Supt James McKay.
- 5 November – RTÉ announce the axing of their morning news programme, Morning Edition, which the broadcaster says will not return to the schedules in the New Year.
- 13 November – RTÉ2 airs the pilot episode of The Unemployables, a programme in which Darren Kennedy and Jennifer Maguire help young unemployed people find work. It is scheduled to return for a full series in 2015.
- 20 November – Two years after closing its London offices, RTÉ News appoints Fiona Mitchell as its new London correspondent. She will take up the position from January 2015 and be based at ITN's London offices.
- 23 November – The Sunday Independent reports that RTÉ are planning to launch an online service that would allow its own content, along with that from TV3, TG4 and UTV, to be accessed by internet users on a free-to-air basis. The service would be similar to that provided by Freeview Connect in the UK.
- 26 November – As a result of the buyback of its former debts from Anglo Irish Bank, TV3 reports a net profit of €7.4m.
- 28 November – UTV Ireland finally confirms that Claire Brock will be joining its news team. The appointment of two other female journalists is also announced. Former Newstalk head of news and sport Sinéad O'Donnell will join the new channel along with Sarah O'Connor, a reporter with North West Radio.
- 29 November – TV3 Group launches its #NewDawn campaign which is part of its rebrand and new schedule for 2015. The campaign kicks off with a 90-second and 60 second TV3 Promo airing at 19:45 on TV3. An advert promoting their newly produced drama series Red Rock is also revealed.

=== December ===
- 1 December – UTV Ireland, due to launch next year, is granted Public Service Status by Minister for Communications, Alex White, TD, allowing it to appear on Saorview.
- 2 December – TV3 launches the timeshift channel TV3 +1 on UPC Ireland Channel 119.
- 3 December – TG4 unveils its Christmas schedule. Programmes include Liam Clancy, Mo Chara a Christmas Day documentary in which family and friends recall their memories of the singer, Ó Ghaillimh go dtí an Ghraonlainn, a documentary about a journey by yacht from Galway to Greenland, and Roger Corman i gConamara telling the story of how film producer Roger Corman established a film studio on the West Coast of Ireland. Films airing over the festive season include a feature-length version of An Bronntanas, as well as Meet The Fockers, Up in Arms, I Am David, Nutty Professor II and Atonement.
- 4 December – The Belfast Telegraph reports that UTV Ireland will not be available to viewers in Northern Ireland, where its sister channel UTV already airs. There will, however, be a small amount of signal overspill, allowing a limited number of viewers in the North to watch its content.
- 7 December – TV3 announce details of its new soap, Red Rock.
- 11 December – UTV Ireland's new headquarters are opened in Dublin by Taoiseach Enda Kenny, who promises that ministers from his government will appear on its current affairs programmes.
- 11 December – Digital Spy reports that TV3 is to launch an ad campaign for its new soap, Red Rock. The first trailer for the soap will appear in a commercial break during an episode of Coronation Street.
- 14 December – TV3 has signed up former Minister for Justice and Equality Alan Shatter to appear in the next series of The Restaurant, it is reported.
- 21 December –
  - Golfer Rory McIlroy is voted the 2014 RTÉ Sports Person of the Year.
  - UTV Ireland has signed RTÉ and TV3 presenter Jenny Buckley as its main weather presenter.
- 22 December – Irish singer and model, and recent I'm a Celebrity...Get Me Out of Here! contestant, Nadia Forde, guests hosts TV3's Xposé.
- 26 December – The James Bond film Skyfall makes its Irish television debut on RTÉ One.
- 30 December – Figures reveal that Mrs. Brown's Boys was the most watched programme in Ireland on Christmas Day for the fourth year in a row, achieving an audience of 703,100.

== Debuts ==
=== RTÉ ===
- 11 January – Ireland's FIttest Family on RTÉ One
- 19 January – Amber on RTÉ One (2014)
- 16 February – Quirke on RTÉ One (2014)
- 6 March – The Walshes on RTÉ One (2014)
- 10 March – Soccer Republic on RTÉ Two (2014–present)
- 22 September – Connected on RTÉ2
- September - Mom on RTÉ Two

=== TV3 ===
- 17 February – The Lie (2014–present)
- 5 March – The People's Debate with Vincent Browne (2014–2016)
- 28 March – Crossfire
- 31 March – Prison Families
- June – Wentworth (2013–2021)

=== TG4 ===
- 30 January – Borgen (2010–2013)
- 20 October - Oh No! It's an Alien Invasion (2013–2015)
- 23 October – An Bronntanas (2014)
- Undated – Peg + Cat (2013–2018)

== Ongoing television programmes ==
=== 1960s ===
- RTÉ News: Nine O'Clock (1961–present)
- RTÉ News: Six One (1962–present)
- The Late Late Show (1962–present)

=== 1970s ===
- The Late Late Toy Show (1975–present)
- RTÉ News on Two (1978–2014)
- The Sunday Game (1979–present)

=== 1980s ===
- Fair City (1989–present)
- RTÉ News: One O'Clock (1989–present)

=== 1990s ===
- Would You Believe (1990s–present)
- Winning Streak (1990–present)
- Prime Time (1992–present)
- Nuacht RTÉ (1995–present)
- Nuacht TG4 (1996–present)
- Ros na Rún (1996–present)
- TV3 News (1998–present)
- Ireland AM (1999–present)
- Telly Bingo (1999–present)

=== 2000s ===
- Nationwide (2000–present)
- TV3 News at 5.30 (2001–present) – now known as the 5.30
- Against the Head (2003–present)
- news2day (2003–present)
- Other Voices (2003–present)
- Saturday Night with Miriam (2005–present)
- The Week in Politics (2006–present)
- Tonight with Vincent Browne (2007–2017)
- Xposé (2007–2019)
- At Your Service (2008–present)
- Championship Live (2008–present) – Now rebranded as GAA on 3
- Midday (2008–2016)
- Operation Transformation (2008–present)
- 3e News (2009–present)
- Dragons' Den (2009–present)
- Republic of Telly (2009–2016)
- Two Tube (2009–present)

=== 2010s ===
- Irish Pictorial Weekly (2012–present)
- Jack Taylor (2010–present)
- Love/Hate (2010–present)
- The Saturday Night Show (2010–2015)
- Mrs. Brown's Boys (2011–present)
- The GAA Show (2011–present)
- MasterChef Ireland (2011–present)
- Paul Connolly Investigates (2011–2015)
- Today (2012–present)
- The Mario Rosenstock Show (2012–2016)
- The Voice of Ireland (2012–2016)
- The Works (2012–present)
- Deception (2013–present)
- The Fall (2013–2016)
- The Great Irish Bake Off (2013–2015)
- Celebrity MasterChef Ireland (2013–present)
- Second Captains Live (2013–present)

== Ending this year ==
- 22 January – Amber (2014)
- 24 March – Family Fortunes (2012–2014)
- 28 May – Midweek (2009–2014)
- 18 September – RTÉ News on Two (1978–2014)
- 28 November – Morning Edition (2013–2014)

== Deaths ==
- 28 January – Ted Nealon, 84; former journalist, broadcaster, and Fine Gael TD for Sligo–Leitrim, illness.
- 11 February – Ronnie Masterson, 87; actress.
- 10 March – Eileen Colgan, 80; actress.
- 21 March – Oliver Maloney, 77, former Director-General of RTÉ
- 22 July – Louis Lentin, 80: theatre, film and television director
- 10 August – Ann Rowan, 85, actress (The Riordans, Father Ted).
- 13 October – Gabrielle Reidy, 54, actress
- 19 October – Gerard Parkes, 90, actor.
- 10 November – Brian Farrell, 85, political broadcaster and academic
- 13 November – Paddy MacHugh, first Telefís Éireann weather forecaster
- 26 November – Anita Notaro, author and former television director
- 30 December – Desmond Fisher, 94, journalist, broadcaster and former head of current affairs with RTÉ

== See also ==
- 2014 in Ireland
