= 2011 in Irish television =

The following is a list of events relating to television in Ireland from 2011.

== Events ==
=== January ===
- 1 January – Long running British-Irish sitcom Mrs. Brown's Boys begins on RTÉ One. It stars Brendan O'Carroll as the grumpy old woman.
- 4 January – Freeview announces details for the launch of ITV1+1, together with the possibility that both STV and UTV will launch their own timeshift services, STV +1 and UTV +1 in Scotland and Northern Ireland respectively. UTV later confirms it will launch UTV+1 at 8pm on 11 January 2011.

=== February ===
- 21 February – British-Irish sitcom Mrs. Brown's Boys begins airing for the first time in the UK on the BBC.

=== May ===
- May – Mission to Prey, presented by Aoife Kavanagh, is aired on RTÉ One, leading to the defamation of Fr. Kevin Reynolds. Justice and Defence Minister Alan Shatter supports the programme at the time.
- 23 May – Helen O'Rahilly, a former director of television at RTÉ launches a scathing attack on its flagship programme, The Late Late Show amid criticism that standards on the programme have slipped since Ryan Tubridy took over as host in 2009. In an online blog, O'Rahilly says, "If I was back in charge of RTÉ, you wouldn’t see this utter shite on Friday night".
- 25 May – RTÉ News Now revamps its on-screen identity, giving viewers more detailed content.
- 26 May – Saorview, the free to air digital television service is launched. The service has eight channels – RTÉ One, RTÉ Two HD, TV3, TG4, RTÉ News Now, 3e, RTÉjr and RTÉ One + 1 – and is available to 97% of households in Ireland. Saorview also carries a new digital RTÉ Aertel service and RTÉ's radio services.

=== June ===
- 6 June – The BBC announces that the national variations of BBC One Northern Ireland, BBC One Scotland and BBC One Wales will become available in high definition in 2012.

=== October ===
- 6 October – BBC Director General Mark Thompson announces that BBC HD will close to be replaced by a high definition simulcast of BBC Two. This BBC Two HD will work much the same way as BBC One HD. This move allows the corporation to save £2.1 million, used to count towards their budget deficit following the freezing of the license fee and the additional financial responsibility of addition services.
- 8 October – TV3's Video on Demand (VOD) is relaunched as 3Player. It replaces the original TV3 Catch-Up service previously available at tv3.ie and through its iPhone/iPad app. The new service was revealed at a press call the previous day1. It is estimated by the TV3 Group that the service will be worth about €7.5 million by 2015. 3Player is in HTML5 format which makes it available on the majority of operating systems.

=== November ===
- 15 November – The Houses of the Oireachtas Channel begins broadcasting on UPC Ireland channel 801, as part of a trial initiative for a period of six months.
- 23 November – Prime Time Investigates is axed as Director-General of RTÉ Noel Curran describes the broadcasting of "Mission to Prey" as "one of the gravest editorial mistakes ever made" at RTÉ.

=== December ===
- 18 December – Golfer Rory McIlroy is named the 2011 RTÉ Sports Person of the Year.
- 19 December – Eugene Heary wins the fourth series of The Apprentice.
- 26 December – Launch of TV50, a series of special events throughout 2012, celebrating the 50th anniversary of the launch of RTÉ Television, then known as Telefís Éireann, on 31 December 1961.

== Debuts ==
=== RTÉ ===
- 1 January – Mrs. Brown's Boys on RTÉ One (2011–present)
- 25 May – The Committee Room on RTÉ Two (2011)
- July – Stars Go Racing on RTÉ One (2011)
- 15 July – For One Night Only on RTÉ One (2011)
- 8 September – MasterChef Ireland on RTÉ Two (2011–present)
- 18 September – Put 'Em Under Pressure on RTÉ One (2011)
- 6 October – The Big Interview with Mike Murphy on RTÉ One (2011)
- 13 November – Francis Brennan's Grand Tour on RTÉ One (2011)
- 15 November – Craig Doyle Live on RTÉ Two (2011–2012)
- 15 November – The Social on RTÉ Two (2011–2012)
- 17 November – Meet Your Neighbours on RTÉ One (2011)
- 25 December – OMG! Jedward's Dream Factory on RTÉ Two (2011–2013)
- Undated – Everything's Rosie on RTÉ Two (2010–2015)
- Undated – Angelina Ballerina: The Next Steps on RTÉ Two (2009–2010)
- Undated – The Avengers: Earth's Mightiest Heroes on RTÉ Two (2010–2013)

=== TV3 ===
- 8 April – Head Chef (2011)
- 3 June – The GAA Show (2011–present)
- 6 June – Come Dine with Me (2011–2013)
- 7 June – Paul Connolly Investigates (2011–2015)
- 11 December – Tallafornia (2011–2013)

== Changes of network affiliation ==
Shows	Moved from	Moved to
Fluffy Gardens	RTÉ Two	RTÉjr
Peppa Pig	RTÉ Two	RTÉjr
The Morbegs	RTÉ Two	RTÉjr
Kazoo	RTÉ Two	RTÉjr
Lifeboat Luke	RTÉ Two	RTÉjr
Charlie and Lola	RTÉ Two	RTÉjr
In the Night Garden...	RTÉ Two	RTÉjr
LazyTown	RTÉ Two	RTÉjr
Scooby-Doo, Where are You!	RTÉ Two	RTÉjr
Scooby-Doo and Scrappy-Doo	RTÉ Two	RTÉjr

== Ongoing television programmes ==
=== 1960s ===
- RTÉ News: Nine O'Clock (1961–present)
- RTÉ News: Six One (1962–present)
- The Late Late Show (1962–present)

=== 1970s ===
- The Late Late Toy Show (1975–present)
- RTÉ News on Two (1978–2014)
- The Sunday Game (1979–present)

=== 1980s ===
- Fair City (1989–present)
- RTÉ News: One O'Clock (1989–present)

=== 1990s ===
- Would You Believe (1990s–present)
- Winning Streak (1990–present)
- Prime Time (1992–present)
- Nuacht RTÉ (1995–present)
- Nuacht TG4 (1996–present)
- Ros na Rún (1996–present)
- Premier Soccer Saturday (1998–2013)
- TV3 News (1998–present)
- Ireland AM (1999–present)
- Telly Bingo (1999–present)

=== 2000s ===
- Nationwide (2000–present)
- TV3 News at 5.30 (2001–present)
- Against the Head (2003–present)
- news2day (2003–present)
- Other Voices on RTÉ Two (2003–present)
- Saturday Night with Miriam (2005–present)
- One to One (2006–2013)
- The Week in Politics (2006–present)
- Tonight with Vincent Browne (2007–2017)
- Xposé (2007–2019)
- Monday Night Soccer (2008–2013)
- At Your Service (2008–present)
- Championship Live (2008–present)
- Midday (2008–2016)
- Operation Transformation (2008–present)
- Raw (2008–2013)
- The Big Money Game (2008–2013)
- 3e News (2009–present)
- Dragons' Den (2009–present)
- The Frontline (2009–2013)
- Midweek (2009–2014)
- The Morning Show with Sybil & Martin (2009–2013)
- Republic of Telly (2009–2016)
- Two Tube (2009–present)

=== 2010s ===
- Fade Street (2010–2011)
- Four Live (2010–2012)
- Jack Taylor (2010–present)
- Love/Hate (2010–present)
- Take Me Out (2010–2013)
- The Daily Show (2010–2012)
- The Saturday Night Show (2010–2015)

== Ending this year ==
- 26 January – The Panel (2003–2011)
- 12 February – Brain Box (2009–2011)
- 11 April – Anonymous (2006–2011)
- 27 May – Head Chef (2011)
- 11 July – Traffic Blues (2009–2011)
- August – Stars Go Racing (2011)
- September – The Committee Room (2011)
- 19 November – The Apprentice (2008–2011)
- November – Mission Beach USA (2010–2011)
- 13 December – The View (1999–2011)

== Deaths ==
- 14 March – Gerald Barry, 63; broadcast and print journalist, following a long illness.
- 3 June – Peter Murphy, 88; television presenter (RTÉ).
- 22 October – Cathal O'Shannon, 83; journalist and television presenter.

== See also ==
- 2011 in Ireland
