= 2017 in Irish television =

The following is a list of events relating to television in Ireland from 2017.

== Events ==
- 8 January – Dancing with the Stars makes its debut on RTÉ One.
- 9 January – TV3 Group reveals a new on-air presentation, featuring the number 3 superimposed on various natural and urban landscapes across Ireland. A new logo is also revealed along with new promos and on-screen graphics. Similarly, new identities are introduced to 3e and its rebrand of UTV Ireland to be3.
- 12 January – Viewing figures indicate that The Late Late Toy Show was the most watched programme of 2016 in Ireland with a total of 1,571,600 viewers.
- 2 February – The Irish Post acquires Irish TV, saving the channel from closure.
- 8 March – Irish TV goes off the air. Its Sky slot is subsequently bought by Viacom International Media Networks Europe to launch Spike +1.
- 26 March – Aidan O'Mahony and dance partner Valeria Milova win the first series of Dancing with the Stars.
- 10 May – It is confirmed that Derval O'Rourke will return to the coaching panel for the fifth season of Ireland's Fittest Family, the first time she has participated in the series since season two.
- 1 June – It is announced that rugby player Donncha O'Callaghan will join Ireland's Fittest Family as the fourth coach.
- 6 July – RTÉ One extends its on-air hours, the channel now starting at 6:00am rather than the later 6:20 am.
- 27 July – Vincent Browne presents his last edition of Tonight with Vincent Browne, with Taoiseach Leo Varadkar as a guest.
- 8 October – An Irish version of Blind Date, hosted by comedian Al Porter, is debuted on TV3.
- 22 November – In the final episode of Series 3 of Gogglebox Ireland, the cast of Daddy's Home 2 - Mel Gibson, John Lithgow, Will Ferrell and Mark Wahlberg - appear as a guest 'family' on the show and review Ireland's Fittest Family, Fair City and Stetsons and Stilettos.
- 1 December – The Late Late Toy Show airs on RTÉ One, and becomes the most-watched programme on Irish television in 2017, with an average audience of 1.3 million viewers.
- 16 December – Footballer James McClean is voted the 2017 RTÉ Sports Person of the Year.
- 17 December – The Beirne family from County Leitrim, coached by Donncha O'Callaghan, win the fifth season of Ireland's Fittest Family. They become the first family who had previously competed in the competition to come back and win the show.

== Debuts ==
=== RTÉ ===
- 1 January – Striking Out on RTÉ One
- 5 January – The Tommy Tiernan Show on RTÉ One
- 8 January – Dancing with the Stars on RTÉ One
- 14 May – Kat & Alfie: Redwater on RTÉ One
- 19 September – Mr. Mercedes on RTÉ One
- 24 September – Acceptable Risk on RTÉ One
- 2 October – Pablo on RTÉ Jr.
- 9 November – Ireland's greatest sporting moment on RTÉ Two

=== TV3 ===
- 20 September – The Tonight Show (2017–present)

== Changes of network affiliation ==
Shows	Moved from	Moved to
Horrid Henry	RTÉ Two	TG4

== Ongoing television programmes ==
=== 1960s ===
- RTÉ News: Nine O'Clock (1961–present)
- RTÉ News: Six One (1962–present)
- The Late Late Show (1962–present)

=== 1970s ===
- The Late Late Toy Show (1975–present)
- The Sunday Game (1979–present)

=== 1980s ===
- Fair City (1989–present)
- RTÉ News: One O'Clock (1989–present)

=== 1990s ===
- Would You Believe (1990s–present)
- Winning Streak (1990–present)
- Prime Time (1992–present)
- Nuacht RTÉ (1995–present)
- Nuacht TG4 (1996–present)
- Ros na Rún (1996–present)
- TV3 News (1998–present)
- Ireland AM (1999–present)
- Telly Bingo (1999–present)

=== 2000s ===
- Nationwide (2000–present)
- TV3 News at 5.30 (2001–present) – now known as the 5.30
- Against the Head (2003–present)
- news2day (2003–present)
- Other Voices (2003–present)
- Saturday Night with Miriam (2005–present)
- The Week in Politics (2006–present)
- Xposé (2007–2019)
- At Your Service (2008–present)
- Championship Live (2008–present) – Now rebranded as GAA on 3
- Operation Transformation (2008–present)
- 3e News (2009–present)
- Dragons' Den (2009–present)
- Two Tube (2009–present)

=== 2010s ===
- Jack Taylor (2010–present)
- Mrs. Brown's Boys (2011–present)
- The GAA Show (2011–present)
- MasterChef Ireland (2011–present)
- Irish Pictorial Weekly (2012–present)
- Today (2012–present)
- The Works (2012–present)
- Deception (2013–present)
- Celebrity MasterChef Ireland (2013–present)
- Second Captains Live (2013–present)
- Claire Byrne Live (2015–present)
- The Restaurant (2015–present)
- Red Rock (2015–present)
- TV3 News at 8 (2015–present)
- Ploughing Live (2015–present)

== Ending this year ==
- 6 January – Ireland Live (2015–2017)
- 27 July – Tonight with Vincent Browne (2007–2017)

== See also ==
- 2017 in Ireland
