= 2010s in Irish television =

For articles on Irish television in the 2010s please see:

- 2010 in Irish television
- 2011 in Irish television
- 2012 in Irish television
- 2013 in Irish television
- 2014 in Irish television
- 2015 in Irish television
- 2016 in Irish television
- 2017 in Irish television
- 2018 in Irish television
- 2019 in Irish television
