= 2010 in Irish television =

The following is a list of events relating to television in Ireland from 2010

== Events ==
=== January ===
- January – The compliance committee of the Broadcasting Authority of Ireland upholds a further ten complaints against TV3 in relation to Play TV. A further three complaints are upheld in February.
- 8 January – Amid a deep freeze and in what has since been commemorated as "one of the most memorable moments of Irish television", an RTÉ news bulletin broadcasts one male individual slipping and sliding down the street in Dublin.

=== February ===
- 1 February – Minister for Communications Eamon Ryan signs an agreement with the UK's Ben Bradshaw enabling viewers within Northern Ireland to watch RTÉ One, RTÉ Two and TG4 on a free-to-air basis as of 2012. The agreement between both jurisdictions will also guarantee that viewers within the Republic of Ireland will be able to view BBC One Northern Ireland and BBC Two Northern Ireland on the Republic's free-to-air service which is to debut in late 2010. A cross-border initiative has always been on the agenda for the Green Party in the Republic of Ireland, but it is later confirmed that BBC Northern Ireland services will be offered in the Republic on a 'paid-for' basis and not the original free-to-air basis.
- 26 February – An edition of RTÉ One's The Late Late Show aired on this date attracts criticism after accusations the show snubbed a television journalist from a rival broadcaster. TV3's Western Correspondent Jenny McCudden was in the audience to promote her book Impact: The Human Stories Behind Ireland's Road Tragedies, but although the title was mentioned by host Ryan Tubridy, McCudden's presence was ignored.

=== March ===
- 3 March – TV3 announces that Play TV's contract has been terminated with immediate effect. In their statement they put the removal of the "infomercial" down purely to audience figures rather than the complaints received and upheld by the Broadcasting Authority of Ireland. They do not apologise for their conduct.

=== April ===
- 19 April – The first part of Growing Up Gay, a groundbreaking two-part documentary series, is broadcast on RTÉ One, exploring the experiences of the first generation of lesbian, gay, bisexual and transgender (LGBT) people growing up in an Ireland where it was legal to be themselves.
- 26 April – Ryanair chief executive Michael O'Leary is briefly left speechless on an edition of RTÉ Two's comedy show Republic of Telly when presenter Jennifer Maguire asks him: "What's it like being the biggest prick in Ireland?"
- 30 April – The broadcaster Gerry Ryan is found dead at his Leeson Street apartment in Dublin.

=== August ===
- 18 August – In an interview with The Irish Times to launch the network's autumn schedule, TV3 CEO David McRedmond admits that mistakes have been made regarding Play TV and that the programme was axed not just due to falling audience figures, but also due to the bad press and the regulators constant scrutiny of the show. He still refuses to apologise to viewers on behalf of TV3.

=== September ===
- 9 September – TV3 begins airing Brain Box, an interactive quiz already showing on UTV in Northern Ireland and STV in Scotland, but ceases transmission after a week. The programme continued on UTV and STV until February 2011.
- 19 September – Long running children's television block The Den gets axed after being shown on Irish television for over 24 years on RTÉ Two.
- 24 September – TV3 launches its iPhone application.
- 28 September – Launch of RTÉ Two's block of programmes for children, TRTÉ.

=== October ===
- 29 October – Launch of Saorview, the national free-to-air digital terrestrial television (DTT) service in the Republic of Ireland. The service operates on a trial basis.
- 29 October – RTÉ News Now launches as a free-to-air channel on Saorview.

=== November ===
- November – RTÉ News Now's iPhone app wins Best Media app, Best Apple App and the Grand Prix awards at 'The Appy's 2010 with The Carphone Warehouse'.
- 9 November – Noel Curran is appointed Director-General of RTÉ.

=== December ===
- 10 December – A Dublin inquest hears that cocaine was most likely the cause of the death of Gerry Ryan after traces of the drug were found in the broadcaster's body.
- 13 December – Michelle Massey wins the third series of The Apprentice.
- 22 December – Golfer Graeme McDowell is voted the 2010 RTÉ Sports Person of the Year.

== Debuts ==
=== RTÉ ===
- 5 January – Waybuloo on RTÉ Two (2009–2013)
- 30 January – The Saturday Night Show on RTÉ One (2010–2015)
- 15 March – The Good Wife on RTÉ Two (2009–2016)
- 10 April – Tonight with Craig Doyle on RTÉ One (2010)
- 13 April – Fame: The Musical on RTÉ One (2010)
- 7 September – Do the Right Thing on RTÉ Two (2010)
- 20 September – The Daily Show on RTÉ One (2010–2012)
- 3 October – Love/Hate on RTÉ One (2010–present)
- 25 October – Mission Beach USA on RTÉ Two (2010–2011)
- 11 November – Fade Street on RTÉ Two (2010–2011)
- 13 November – WordGirl on RTÉ Two (2010–2018)
- Autumn – Four Live on RTÉ One (2010–2012)
- Undated –
  - Ruby Gloom on RTÉ Two (2006–2008)
  - Class of 3000 on RTÉ Two (2006–2008)
  - Out of Jimmy's Head on RTÉ Two (2007–2008)

=== TV3 ===
- 2 August – Jack Taylor (2010–present)
- 15 October – Take Me Out (2010–2013)

=== TG4 ===
- 4 January – Chop Socky Chooks (2008)
- 7 April – An Crisis (2010–2013)
- Undated –
  - Sandra the Fairytale Detective (2009–2010)
  - Eliot Kid (2008–2009)
  - The Garfield Show (2008–2015)

== Changes of network affiliation ==
Shows	Moved from	Moved to
Atomic Betty	RTÉ2	TG4

== Ongoing television programmes ==
=== 1960s ===
- RTÉ News: Nine O'Clock (1961–present)
- RTÉ News: Six One (1962–present)
- The Late Late Show (1962–present)

=== 1970s ===
- The Late Late Toy Show (1975–present)
- RTÉ News on Two (1978–2014)
- The Sunday Game (1979–present)

=== 1980s ===
- Fair City (1989–present)
- RTÉ News: One O'Clock (1989–present)

=== 1990s ===
- Would You Believe (1990s–present)
- Winning Streak (1990–present)
- Prime Time (1992–present)
- Nuacht RTÉ (1995–present)
- Nuacht TG4 (1996–present)
- Ros na Rún (1996–present)
- Premier Soccer Saturday (1998–2013)
- TV3 News (1998–present)
- The View (1999–2011)
- Ireland AM (1999–present)
- Telly Bingo (1999–present)

=== 2000s ===
- Nationwide (2000–present)
- TV3 News at 5.30 (2001–present)
- The Panel (2003–2011)
- Against the Head (2003–present)
- news2day (2003–present)
- Other Voices (2003–present)
- Saturday Night with Miriam (2005–present)
- Anonymous (2006–2011)
- One to One (2006–2013)
- The Week in Politics (2006–present)
- Tonight with Vincent Browne (2007–2017)
- Xposé (2007–2019)
- The Apprentice (2008–2011)
- Monday Night Soccer (2008–2013)
- At Your Service (2008–present)
- Championship Live (2008–present)
- Midday (2008–2016)
- Operation Transformation (2008–present)
- Raw (2008–2013)
- The Big Money Game (2008–2013)
- Brain Box (2009–2011)
- 3e News (2009–present)
- Dragons' Den (2009–present)
- The Frontline (2009–2013)
- Midweek (2009–2014)
- The Morning Show with Sybil & Martin (2009–2013)
- Republic of Telly (2009–2016)
- Traffic Blues (2009–2011)
- Two Tube (2009–present)

== Ending this year ==
- 6 March – Play TV (2009–2010)
- 12 March – Deal or No Deal (2009–2010)
- 27 April – The Podge and Rodge Show (2006–2010)
- 20 May – Ryan Confidential (2004–2010)
- 29 May – Tonight with Craig Doyle (2010)
- May – The Afternoon Show (2004–2010)
- 17 September – Championship Throw-In (2008–2010)
- 19 September – Dempsey's Den (1986–2010)
- 16 December – Livin' with Lucy (2008–2010)

== Deaths ==
- 3 January – Dick Hill, 71, former controller of programmes of RTÉ Television
- 30 April – Gerry Ryan, 53, radio and television broadcaster

== See also ==
- 2009 in Ireland
