= Mary Curtis =

Mary Curtis may refer to:

- Mary C. Curtis (born 1953), American journalist
- Mary Curtis Ratcliff (born 1942), American visual artist
- Mary Curtis Richardson (née Curtis, 1848–1931). American impressionist painter
- Mary Curtis Verna (née Curtis, 1927–2009), American operatic soprano
- Mary Curtis (TV executive), head of UTV Ireland
- Mary Louise Curtis (1876–1970), founder of the Curtis Institute of Music in Philadelphia
