= Stars Go Racing =

- Country of origin: Ireland
- No. of seasons: 1
- No. of episodes: 6

Production
- Running time: 30 minutes

Original release
- Network: RTÉ One
- Release: July 2011 – August 2011

Stars Go Racing is a six-part reality programme which aired in the summer of 2011 on RTÉ One. Six Irish personalities were shown the business of horse training from six established Irish trainers and then competed against each other at race meetings in Ireland. The final of the competition took place at Leopardstown. The first episode aired on 20 July 2011. The competition was won by presenter Ella McSweeney.

== Competitors ==
| Celebrity | Occupation |
|---|---|
| Linda Martin | Former Eurovision Song Contest winner |
| Francis Brennan | At Your Service presenter |
| Alan Quinlan | Former Ireland rugby union international player |
| Jean Byrne | RTÉ weather forecaster |
| Ella McSweeney | RTÉ television presenter |
| Mike Denver | Country music singer |
