= Championship Matters =

- Genre: Gaelic games
- Presented by: Marty Morrissey
- Country of origin: Ireland
- No. of seasons: 2

Production
- Production locations: RTÉ Television Centre, Donnybrook, Dublin 4
- Camera setup: Multi-camera
- Running time: 30 minutes

Original release
- Network: RTÉ Two
- Release: May 2012 – present

Related
- The Sunday Game

Championship Matters is a Gaelic games-themed magazine and review television programme that has aired on RTÉ Two since May 2012. Presented by Marty Morrissey, the programme features a mix of interviews, analysis and discussion on all GAA related matters. The show follows on from The Committee Room which was shown in 2011.

== History ==
In 2011, RTÉ's commissioning editors sought new ideas for a Gaelic games-based midweek programme that would complement The Sunday Game. The eighteen half-hour programmes would be broadcast on either Wednesday or Thursday evenings; however, provision would be made for a one-hour show. RTÉ Sport would provide a programme set, opening animation and programme graphics for the series, subject to further discussion with the successful company. In May, RTÉ announced that The Committee Room would be hosted by RTÉ's Head of Gaelic Games Marty Morrissey and would feature interviews, analysis and debates. That began on 25 May 2011. Axed the following September, for the 2012 season it was replaced by Championship Matters, with the same presenter.

== Broadcast ==
Championship Matters is broadcast live every Thursday evening during the championship season at 8:30 p.m. on RTÉ Two and is repeated again on the following Saturday. The Committee Room was broadcast live from the RTÉ Television Centre every Wednesday evening during the championship season at 8:00 p.m. on RTÉ Two and was repeated in a late-night slot the following Thursday.
