= Dil Wickremasinghe =

Broadcaster and journalist living in Ireland

- Born: 1973 (age 52–53); Rome, Italy
- Occupation: Broadcaster
- Partner: Anne Marie Toole
- Website: http://www.dilw.ie/

Dil Wickremasinghe is a broadcaster and journalist living in Ireland. She was a radio presenter with Newstalk and is a panellist on TV3's Midday programme. She has also done stand-up comedy.

== Biography ==
Born in Rome to Sri Lankan parents, who rejected her at the age of 17 after she told them she was gay and she became homeless as a result. Her mother, a Jehovah's Witness, attempted to "cure" her of her lesbianism after she fell in love with a girl. She is also a survivor of sexual abuse. While in Sri Lanka, she had a job on the radio but was dismissed in a dispute over her sexual orientation. As well as Italy and Sri Lanka, she lived for a time in Bahrain. She moved to Ireland in 2000.

She later experienced depression and received counselling from One in Four (the charity founded by Colm O'Gorman). She first met her partner, the psychotherapist Anne Marie Toole, when they shared a room at a weekend mental health conference in Wicklow. They started dating one month later.

On 4 February 2014, she received the Lord Mayor of Dublin's Frederick Douglass Award.
