= Francis Brennan (hotelier) =

Irish hotelier and television personality

- Born: 24 September 1953 (age 73); Dublin, Ireland
- Occupations: Hotelier; businessman; television; personality
- Known for: At Your Service, Stars Go Racing, Francis Brennan's Grand Tour
- Website: francisbrennan.ie

Francis Brennan (born 24 September 1953) is an Irish television personality and former hotelier.

== Personal life ==
Brennan was raised in Balally Drive, just off Sandyford Road and close to Dundrum, Dublin. He went to Holy Cross National School, Dundrum, CBS Westland Row and Catholic University School (CUS) in Leeson Street where he was taught by the Marist Fathers. Brennan has never married or had children, and has described himself as being on the asexual spectrum.

== Career ==
=== Hotelier ===
Brennan acquired the five-star Park Hotel in Kenmare in the 1980's and owned it until 2023. He ran the hotel with his brother John. The brothers sold the hotel along with another hotel in the town of Kenmare in 2023.

=== Television ===
Brennan rose to fame in Ireland in 2008 after starring in RTÉ series At Your Service with his younger brother John, in which the Brennans provided advice to the owners of struggling businesses in the hospitality sector. Francis is known for his meticulous attention to detail. The brothers appeared together as guests on Tubridy Tonight in October 2008 and on The Saturday Night Show in January 2011.

Brennan has since made other television appearances separately from his brother. He appeared in Stars Go Racing in 2011. In 2011, he starred in his own TV show called Francis Brennan's Grand Tour, the premise of which saw Brennan flamboyantly escort 16 paying holidaymakers on a tour of the European continent. A further series of Francis Brennan's Grand Tour was broadcast in July and August 2016, this time taking 12 paying holidaymakers on a tour of India's Golden Triangle, followed by a third series in 2017 with a trip to Vietnam Despite his high profile on television screens, he has admitted to never watching television himself. He is a devout Roman Catholic and has a set of rosary beads given to him by Pope John Paul II.

=== Writing ===
During September 2022, Brennan announced the release of his book "The Homekeeper’s Diary 2023". The book, based on inspiring readers to remodel their homes, advice on cleaning, gardening, cooking, foraging and other aspects of household living. Brennan has released a number of other books.

== Filmography ==
=== Television ===
Title	Year	Notes
At Your Service	2008-present	13 series
Stars Go Racing	2011	6 episodes
Francis Brennan's Grand Tour	2011-2018	4 series
Francis Brennan - All Hands On Deck	2019	3 part series

== Bibliography ==
Book	Year
It's The Little Things: Francis Brennan’s Guide to Life	2014
Counting My Blessings: Francis Brennan’s Guide to Happiness	2015
Francis Brennan's Book of Household Management: How to Create a Happy Home	2017
A Gentleman Abroad: Francis Brennan’s Travel Tales	2018
The Homekeeper's Diary 2021	2020
The Homekeeper's Diary 2022	2021
The Homekeeper's Diary 2023	2022
Age is Just a Number	2023
