= The Mario Rosenstock Show =

- Genre: Comedy
- Created by: Mario Rosenstock
- Presented by: Mario Rosenstock
- Country of origin: Ireland
- Original language: English
- No. of seasons: 3
- No. of episodes: 20

Production
- Camera setup: Multi-camera
- Running time: 30 minutes

Original release
- Network: RTÉ Two
- Release: 12 November 2012 – 2016

The Mario Rosenstock Show is an Irish topical sketch comedy show that first aired on RTÉ Two television in Ireland on 12 November 2012. The show features Mario Rosenstock's performing as characters from the world of sports, politics and entertainment.

A second series of the show had been confirmed in December 2012. The second series began on Monday 16 September 2013.

== Controversy ==
An episode of the first series contained a sketch showing a man spitting into a bucket before receiving Holy Communion at mass. An association representing the Irish Catholic Bishops formally complained to RTÉ about the sketch, saying that it is "grossly offensive to all Catholics".

== Character Sketches Series 1 ==
- Michael D. Higgins
- Vincent Browne
- Joan Burton
- James Reilly
- Roy Keane
- Miriam O'Callaghan
- Micheál Martin
- Willie O'Dea
- Louis Walsh
- Daniel O'Donnell
- Enda Kenny
- Michael Flatley
- Mick Wallace
- Clare Daly
- Gerald Kean
- Luke 'Ming' Flanagan
- Eamon Gilmore
- Jim Corr
- Bertie Ahern
- Keith Duffy
- Gay Byrne
- Dáithí Ó Sé
- Pádraig Flynn
- Keith Barry
- David Murphy (RTÉ News)
- Leo Varadkar
- Ursula Halligan
- Ronan O'Gara
- Michael Noonan
- Michael O'Leary
- Love/Hate characters sketch

== New Character Sketches Series 2 ==
- Davy Fitzgerald
- Francis Brennan
- Alan Shatter
- Giovanni Trapattoni
- Donal Skehan
- José Mourinho
- Pat Kenny
- Eva Orsmond
- Aengus Mac Grianna
- John Delaney
- Mick McCarthy
- Brian Kerr
- Ryan Tubridy
- Jean Byrne
- Michael Noonan
- Michael Douglas
