= Ireland's greatest sporting moment =

Irish television series

Ireland's greatest sporting moment was a series of five programmes that aired in 2017 to find Ireland's best moment of sport in the television era. The programmes were presented by Evanne Ní Chuilinn and Des Cahill with the series starting on RTÉ2 on 9 November 2017.

Four moments were voted for over the first four weeks between 1962 and 2012 with each week's winner progressing to the grand final. The overall winner was revealed in the final programme which aired on 7 December 2017.

The winning moment was Ireland's penalty shootout win over Romania at the 1990 FIFA World Cup.

== List of "moments" ==
- Munster's 12-0 victory over the All Blacks in 1978.
- Ray Houghton's winning goal against England at Euro 88.
- Ireland's penalty shootout win over Romania at the 1990 FIFA World Cup.
- Pádraig Harrington wins his first golf Major at the 2007 Open.
