= Mary C. Curtis =

American journalist

Mary Curtis
- Born: Mary Cecelia Curtis; September 4, 1953 (age 73); Baltimore, Maryland, U.S.
- Education: Fordham University (BA)
- Website: Official website

Mary Cecelia Curtis (born September 4, 1953) is an American journalist who has been a reporter and editor at major publications including The New York Times, Baltimore Sun, and the Arizona Daily Star. She was inducted into the Hall of Fame of the Region IV National Association of Black Journalists in 2004. Curtis is now a columnist for Roll Call and a senior facilitator for The OpEd Project. She is known for her coverage of politics as it intersects with race and culture, and for being a pioneer and advocate for diversity in U.S. news media.

== Early life ==
Curtis was born in Baltimore, Maryland, to Thomas and Evelyn Curtis. She was named for her grandmother, Mary Cecelia, and uses her middle initial in her honor.

Several of her siblings and her mother were politically active. She credits her start in journalism to being around that activism: "Because I was around all that activity when I was very young and I was very encouraged to take part in those discussions, I feel as though I always was an observer and a journalist, in a way. I liked to observe," Curtis commented.

She graduated from Seton High School in 1971 where she was an editor for her school paper. She went on to Fordham University, where she earned a bachelor's degree in communications in 1975.

== Career ==
Curtis has worked for major newspapers and websites in the U.S. From 1985 to 1994, she worked as editor in several sections of The New York Times including helping to develop the section "The Living Arts". She edited features in the arts and entertainment section of the Baltimore Sun, was a reporter and editor with the Associated Press in New York and Hartford, Connecticut and with the Arizona in Tucson. She has contributed to NBC News, NPR, the Washington Post, The Root, ESPN's The Undefeated and talks about politics on WCCB-TV in Charlotte, North Carolina.

Curtis was a national correspondent for AOL's Politics Daily and she covered the 2008, 2012 and 2016 U.S. presidential campaigns. In 2011, she joined the Washington Post as a contributor for the blog, "She the People." She covered the 2012 Democratic National Convention for the Charlotte Observer. She covered the politics and family of U.S. President Barack Obama and First Lady Michelle Obama, and how their relationship shaped their politics.

In 2013, Curtis did an interview with The History Makers, a "digital repository for the black experience."

== Personal life ==
She is a wife and mother, and lives in Charlotte, North Carolina.

Curtis is Catholic.

== Awards and honors ==
- 2004 Green Eyeshade Awards from the Society of Professional Journalists
- 2005 Carmage Walls Prize for commentary from the Southern Newspaper Publishers Association
- 2006 Nieman Fellowship at Harvard University
- 2011 Kiplinger Fellow at the Scripps Journalism School
- Multiple honors from the Clarion Award from the Association for Women in Communications, most recently for the 2018 for her column in Roll Call
- Curtis was inducted into the Hall of Fame of the Region IV National Association of Black Journalists in 2004.

== Publications ==
Contributor to Love Her, Love Her Not: The Hillary Paradox (She Writes Press, 2015)
