= Francis Brennan's Grand Tour =

- Presented by: Francis Brennan
- Country of origin: Ireland
- No. of seasons: 4
- No. of episodes: 18

Production
- Running time: 30 minutes

Original release
- Network: RTÉ One
- Release: 13 November 2011 – 26 August 2018

Francis Brennan's Grand Tour was a reality programme which first aired in 2011 on RTÉ One. Over the course of the first series, hotelier Francis Brennan guides sixteen Irish tourists around six major European destinations during a twelve-day journey. Series 2 started on 17 July 2016, this time taking twelve Irish tourists on a tour of India's Golden Triangle. Series 3 started on 9 July 2017, with twelve tourists being taken on a trip to Vietnam. Series 4 started on 22 July 2018 with the destination being South Africa.

== Episodes ==
=== Series 1 - European Tour (2011) ===
Episode	Description
1	During the first episode sixteen tourists fly from Dublin to Barcelona.
2	The tour travels from Barcelona to Carcassonne in France.
3	The tour travels from Carcassonne to Cannes on the French Riviera.
4	The tour travels from Cannes to the town of Stresa on Lake Maggiore in the Italian Lakes.
5	The tour travels from the Italian Lakes to Donnini in Tuscany.
6	The tour moves from Tuscany to their final destination Rome.

=== Series 2 - Tour of India (2016) ===
Episode	Description
1	During the first episode twelve tourists fly from Dublin to Delhi.
2	The tour moves to Agra where they pay a visit to the Taj Mahal.
3	The tour visit the abandoned city of Fatehpur Sikri before visiting the Amber Fort.
4	The tour travels to Jaipur where they visit the Palace of the Winds, browse the bazaars and go on a camel ride.
5	The tour try out laughing yoga in Jaipur's Central Park before spotting tigers on a safari in Ranthambore National Park.
6	The tour concludes with a train journey from Ranthambore back to the capital Delhi.

=== Series 3 - Tour of Vietnam (2017) ===
Episode	Description
1	The tour begins in Hanoi
2	Temple of Literature and Thay Pagoda in Hanoi; on to Mai Châu District.
3	Tour of the mountains; Halong Bay
4	Halong Bay; Ho Chi Minh City
5	Ho Chi Minh City; Cao Dai Temple; Cu Chi Tunnels
6	Mekong Delta; Mekong River

=== Series 4 - Tour of South Africa (2018) ===
Episode	Description
1	The tour begins in Johannesburg.
2	Soweto and Pretoria.
3	Safari at Sibuya Game Reserve.
4	The Garden Route.
5	Cape Town.
6	The tour concludes on the Cape Peninsula.
