= Alison Comyn =

Irish politician (born 1969)

Senator Alison Comyn
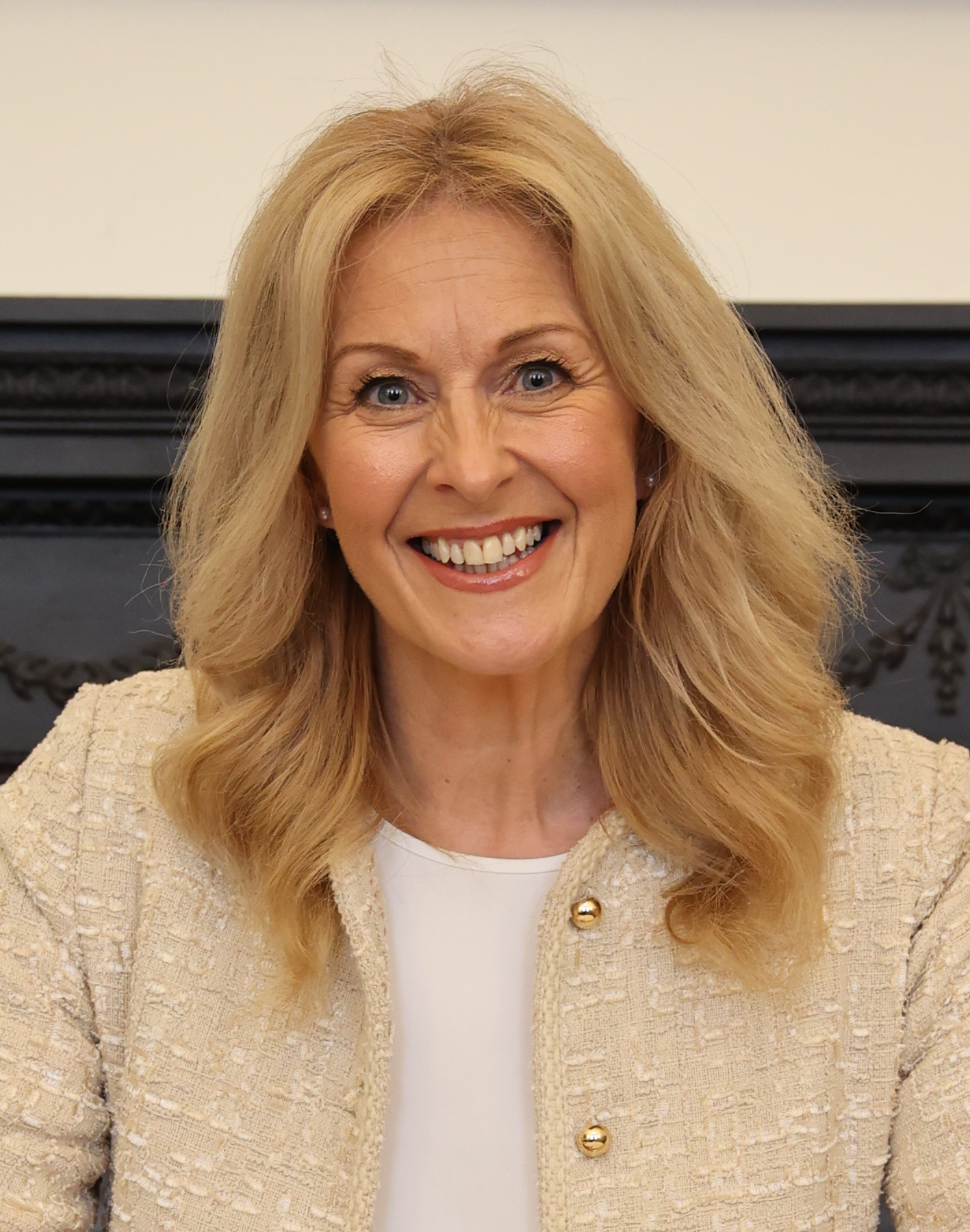
- Comyn in 2025

Senator
- Incumbent
- Assumed office 7 February 2025
- Constituency: Nominated by the Taoiseach

Personal details
- Born: 28 October 1969 (age 56) Drogheda, County Louth, Ireland
- Party: Fianna Fáil
- Spouse: Malachy Murphy (m. 2001; div. 2018)
- Children: 2
- Occupation: Journalist; Politician

Alison Comyn (born 28 October 1969) is an Irish Fianna Fáil politician who has served as a senator since February 2025 after being nominated by the Taoiseach. She is a former Irish television journalist and broadcaster.

She has presented Sky World News on Sky News, and occasionally presented Sunrise with Stephen Dixon, She was formerly the news anchor of UTV Ireland's weekday news and current affairs programmes Ireland Live news and Ireland Live news at 10 which aired between January 2015 and January 2017. It won the IFTA for Best News programme for its Brexit coverage in 2016. She has also worked for the Drogheda Independent from 2006 to 2014, and from 2018 to 2024. She was an unsuccessful Fianna Fáil candidate for Louth at the 2024 general election.

== Journalism career ==
Comyn previously worked on programmes with RTÉ, BBC, Sky News and Channel 4. Prior to working at UTV Ireland, she was a reporter with Independent Newspapers, covering regional, political, crime and current affairs issues, including her column "Comyn Sense". She was also a reporter and news anchor with Newsline on BBC NI and Sky News Ireland.

She also presented BBC One's national Holiday programme from 1997 to 2000, where she worked alongside Jill Dando, Carol Smillie and Craig Doyle.

In April 2017, she presented RTE's Liveline programme on RTÉ Radio 1 for two weeks.

== Political career ==
On 26 August 2024, Comyn was added as a Fianna Fáil candidate for the Louth constituency for the 2024 general election alongside senator Erin McGreehan, but Comyn was not elected. Comyn was appointed to Seanad Éireann on 7 February 2025 by Taoiseach Micheál Martin.

== Personal life ==
Comyn was married to Malachy Murphy from 2001 to 2018, and they have two children.
