= Championship Throw-In =

- Genre: Sport
- Presented by: Matt Cooper (2008); Sinéad Kissane (2009-10); Kieran McSweeney (2009-10)
- Country of origin: Ireland
- Original language: English
- No. of seasons: 3
- No. of episodes: 47

Production
- Camera setup: Multi-camera
- Running time: 30 minutes

Original release
- Network: TV3
- Release: 29 May 2008 – 17 September 2010

Related
- The GAA Show; Championship Live

Championship Throw-In is a Gaelic games-themed magazine television programme that was broadcast on TV3 between 2008 and 2010. Presented by Matt Cooper, and subsequently by Sinéad Kissane and Kieran McSweeney, the programme offered analysis and discussion on the big stories in hurling and football during the championship season.

== History ==
Since TV3 were granted the rights to show exclusive coverage of Gaelic Athletic Association (GAA) championship games in 2008, the station immediately increased its Gaelic games-based programming. Championship Live was TV3's chief programme in this regard as it carried live coverage of one or more of the day's big championship games. This weekend programme was to be complemented by Championship Throw-In, a midweek Gaelic games magazine-style programme. The first edition of the show was a one-hour special which was broadcast on 29 May 2008.

== Format ==
For the first series Championship Throw-In was a studio-based programme. Matt Cooper was joined by a special panel of analysts to discuss the upcoming big matches of the weekend. The second and third series saw the show abandon the studio-based element in favour of the presenters travelling to rival camps and interviewing the respective managers and key players. One of the Championship Live analysts would also offer their opinion on upcoming games.

== Broadcast ==
Championship Throw-In was initially broadcast from the TV3 studio complex at Westgate Business Park, Dublin 24. The show usually aired at 10:30 p.m. on Thursday nights. Midway through the series the show was moved to a 7:30 p.m. time slot due to poor ratings. The second and third series moved to a Friday-night slot at 6:30 p.m. and abandoned the studio-based element of the show.
