= Mary Curtis (TV executive) =

Irish tv executive

- Born: Mary Curtis
- Notable work: Most senior woman in TV in Ireland as head of UTV

Mary Curtis is a TV executive who became the most senior woman in television on the island of Ireland when she became head of UTV Ireland in 2014. Having left UTV in 2016 she became a board member of the Broadcasting Authority of Ireland. She was appointed chairperson of the BAI in 2022, the first female chair for the organisation.

== Career ==
Mary Curtis is from County Carlow. She has a primary degree in English and Education and worked as a teacher for three years. However she took a career break and got involved in television production.

Initially she got a position as a researcher, predominantly working on The Late Late Show. She then trained as a producer/ director in RTE. She worked as a producer, executive producer and as commissioning executive. Curtis was also appointed Deputy Director of Content. She was also Director of Digital Switchover with responsibility for the transition from analogue to digital. She oversaw all aspects of marketing, advertising, communication, public affairs, public information for Saorview. She also oversaw RTE's digital strategy for digital channels.

Curtis left RTÉ in 2013 and went on to become the head of UTV Ireland in 2014.

When she left UTV, Curtis was appointed to the board of the Broadcasting Authority of Ireland.

Since leaving RTE, Curtis has also run a set up a consultancy business working with state bodies and businesses. She also has an MSc in Business and Team Coaching from the Smurfit School of Business, UCD, and works as both an executive and team coach.
