= Jenny Buckley =

Irish actress and television presenter

- Born: 1979 (age 46–47); Ireland
- Occupations: Presenter and actress
- Known for: UTV Ireland weather presenter
- Spouse: Garret McClean
- Children: 1

Jenny Buckley (born 1979) is an Irish actress and television presenter, who was the main weather presenter on UTV Ireland from the channel's launch in January 2015. She has also presented the channel's entertainment bulletin, The Pulse.

== Career ==
A native of Howth, Dublin, Ireland, Buckley started acting on stage and screen, appearing in productions such as The Woman Who Walked into Doors and Tara Road. She joined Channel 6 as a presenter in 2006, where her credits include hosting series such as Access Hollywood and Cois Farraige, before going on to present for both TV3 and RTÉ. In 2010, she co-hosted RTÉ's travel show No Frontiers, and has also appeared on Celebrity Apprentice Ireland. In December 2014, and ahead of its launch, UTV Ireland announced it had signed Buckley as its main weather presenter. She joined the channel as it went on air in January 2015, and presents the weather forecast following UTV's evening news programmes, Ireland Live and Ireland Live at 10. In March 2015, Buckley launched UTV Ireland's "Bringing U Home" campaign for Saint Patrick's Day, which encouraged Irish people living overseas to submit greetings videos to friends and relatives, with entries having a chance to win return air tickets to Ireland from wherever they were currently living. In July 2015, Buckley began presenting The Pulse, a three-minute entertainment bulletin that airs before the Friday afternoon edition of Ireland Live. Within days of its launch, UTV were forced to reject claims that the show was inspired by TV3's Xposé after critics noted the similar colour schemes used on the sets of both programmes. In September 2015, Buckley told the Irish Daily Mirror that UTV planned to extend the programme to a 30-minute slot by the end of the year.

Buckley is also a voiceover artist and has contributed to commercials for companies such as Bank of Ireland, UPC Ireland and Dunnes Stores, as well as several ebooks.

She was nominated in the Most Stylish Newcomer category at the 2015 Peter Mark VIP Style Awards, alongside Stephanie Roche and Aoife Walsh.

== Personal life ==
Buckley is married to Garrett McClean, an executive director with property firm CBRE, and they have two daughters.
