= Ireland Live =

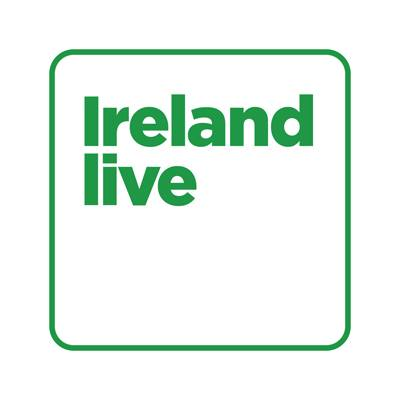
- Also known as: Ireland Live at Ten; Ireland Live News
- Presented by: Alison Comyn
- Country of origin: Republic of Ireland
- Original language: English

Production
- Executive producers: Marcus Lehnen (Head of News); Margaret Ward; Cece Leadon
- Producers: Yvonne Redmond; Siobhán Silke
- Production locations: Dublin, Republic of Ireland
- Editors: Mick McCaffrey (News Editor)
- Camera setup: Multi-camera
- Running time: 60 minutes (10 p.m. programme); 30 minutes (5.30 p.m. programme)
- Production company: UTV Ireland

Original release
- Network: UTV Ireland
- Release: 5 January 2015 – 6 January 2017

Related
- UTV Live; RTÉ News and Current Affairs; TV3 News

Ireland Live is an Irish television news and current affairs service produced by UTV Ireland. Ireland Live featured national, international and regional news, including extended reports, interviews and sports coverage during its flagship hour-long programme at 10 p.m. on weeknights. UTV Ireland's chief news anchor was Alison Comyn.

The news service was produced and broadcast from UTV Ireland's headquarters at Macken House in Dublin's Docklands, with district reporters and camera crews based at regional newsrooms in Cork, Limerick and Galway. UTV's Northern Ireland newsrooms in Belfast, Derry and the Parliament Buildings in Stormont are also utilised. International news coverage is provided by independent broadcast agency Feature Story News. UTV Ireland's head of news was Marcus Lehnen, with Margaret Ward and Cece Leadon as executive producers.

IFTA 2016 Winner. Best news programme. ‘Brexit Special’. Ireland Live News at 5.30.

== Broadcast times ==
Ireland Live broadcast a half-hour evening newscast and an hour-long programme at 10:00 p.m. Its early-evening news initially aired at 6:30 p.m. on weeknights until May 2015, when it moved to 5:30 p.m., putting it in direct comparison with TV3's The 5.30. In parallel with this change, UTV Ireland also began to broadcast hourly Ireland Live news updates throughout the day.

Ireland Live also produced local news updates aired during UTV Ireland's simulcasts of Good Morning Britain.

== On air team ==
=== Presenters ===
- Alison Comyn (main anchor at 17:30 & 22:00 programmes)
- Claire Brock (main anchor at 22:00)
- Jenny Buckley (Weather presenter)

=== Reporters and correspondents ===
- Claire Brock
- Eric Clarke
- Paul Colgan (Economics Editor)
- Darragh Collins
- Marie Crowe (Sport)
- Sean Dunne
- Stephanie Grogan
- Claudia Headon
- Luke Holohan (Online Journalist)
- Aidan Kelly
- Zara King
- Sharon Lynch (Dublin Videojournalist)
- Sarah O'Connor
- Sinead O'Donnell
- Marése O'Sullivan (Online Journalist)
- Bernard O'Toole (Sport)
- Denis Mahon (Dublin Videojournalist)
- Anita McSorley
- Christina McSorley (Dublin Videojournalist)
- Kevin Purcell (Reporter)
- Mary Regan (Political Editor)
- Naoimh Reilly (Cork Videojournalist)

=== Former presenters ===
- Chris Donoghue (10 p.m. programme)
- Ger Gilroy (Friday sports preview)

After the station shut down many of the reporters moved to either RTÉ news or Virgin Media news.
