= The GAA Show =

- Genre: Sport
- Presented by: Sinéad Kissane; Kieran McSweeney
- Country of origin: Ireland
- Original language: English
- No. of seasons: 1
- No. of episodes: 12

Production
- Camera setup: Multi-camera
- Running time: 30 minutes

Original release
- Network: 3e, TV3
- Release: 3 June 2011 – present

Related
- Championship Live

The GAA Show is a Gaelic games-themed magazine television programme that has aired on 3e and TV3 since 2011. Presented by Sinéad Kissane and Kieran McSweeney, the programme covers the big stories in hurling and football during the championship season.

== History ==
Since TV3 were granted the rights to show exclusive coverage of Gaelic Athletic Association (GAA) championship games in 2008, the station immediately increased its Gaelic games-based programming. Championship Live was TV3's chief programme in this regard as it carried live coverage of one or more of the day's big championship games. This was complemented by Championship Throw-In, a midweek Gaelic games programme initially presented by Matt Cooper which featured studio-based discussion and analysis about upcoming games. This programme eventually dropped the studio element and became a magazine-style programme. It aired for three series until 2010. In 2011 it was replaced by The GAA Show.

== Format ==
The GAA Show usually features a preview of the big game of the weekend. Both presenters travel to rival camps and interview the respective managers and a key player. There are a number of other segments to the programme also. "Team Talk" highlights a particular player involved in the weekend's big match. " Video Vault" features clips from a previous encounter between the teams. "Minor Matters" looks at the weekend's action in the All-Ireland minor championships. "Panel Beaters" features pundits who give their predictions for the weekend's games.

== Broadcast ==
The GAA Show is broadcast every Friday evening during the championship season at 6:30 p.m. on 3e. It is repeated at 11:00 p.m. that same night on TV3. A second repeat is shown on TV3 on Saturday mornings.
