= Virgin Media Three =

Irish television channel

- Country: Ireland
- Network: Virgin Media Television

Programming
- Language: English
- Picture format: 1080i HDTV (downscaled to 16:9 576i for the SDTV feed)

Ownership
- Owner: Virgin Media Ireland
- Sister channels: Virgin Media One; Virgin Media Two; Virgin Media Four

History
- Launched: 1 January 2015; 11 years ago (as UTV Ireland)
- Former names: UTV Ireland (2015–2017) be3 (2017–2018)

Availability

Terrestrial
- Saorview: Channel 6

Streaming media
- Virgin TV Anywhere: Watch live (Ireland only)
- Virgin Media Play: Watch live (Ireland only)

Virgin Media Three, is an Irish free-to-air television channel owned by Virgin Media Television.

The channel was first launched by Northern Irish broadcaster UTV Media on 1 January 2015 as UTV Ireland; it primarily carried programmes licensed from British broadcaster ITV, along with some local news and lifestyle programmes. In July 2016, after ITV plc acquired UTV's television business and ITV franchise, UTV Ireland was sold to Virgin Media Ireland and merged into its TV3 division; it was rebranded as be3 on 9 January 2017, which primarily focuses on programmes targeting women.

== History ==
=== UTV Ireland ===
UTV Ireland logo (1 January 2015 – 8 January 2017)

On 6 November 2013, UTV Media—owner of UTV, the Northern Ireland franchise of UK television network ITV—announced that it had submitted a proposal to the Broadcasting Authority of Ireland (BAI) to operate a channel in the Republic of Ireland known as UTV Ireland. Ahead of the announcement, UTV reached an agreement to acquire the Republic of Ireland broadcast rights to several key ITV programmes from ITV Studios, including Coronation Street and Emmerdale—replacing TV3; pending regulatory approval, UTV planned to launch the new channel by early-2015. UTV planned to have a national news service at launch, leveraging resources from its radio stations in the Republic. It planned to employ around 100 people, with 30 of these jobs being based around the country.

TV3's CEO David McRedmond remarked that losing rights to ITV's soaps to UTV Ireland would allow it to reallocate their cost towards domestic programmes. Nevertheless, in January 2014 The Sunday Times reported that TV3 had launched a lobbying campaign opposing UTV's license proposal. On 27 February 2014, the BAI approved UTV's license proposal. On 29 April 2014, Mary Curtis became UTV Ireland's first chief. On 1 December 2014, UTV Ireland was granted Public Service Status by Minister for Communications Alex White, allowing it to appear on Saorview.

UTV Ireland launched at 7:25 p.m. on 1 January 2015; its opening night of programmes featured a New Year's Day-themed launch special, Out with the Old — In with the U, which was hosted by veteran personality Pat Kenny and featured appearances by Hozier, Tommy Bowe, and other network personalities. Five days later, the channel launched its national news service, Ireland Live.

In June 2015, UTV Group reported losses of €16.2 million on the channel due to poor daytime and weekend ratings performance, and it was reported that the network was planning a revamp of its branding and lineup within the coming months. Managing Director Michael Wilson defended UTV Ireland's performance, noting that Coronation Street and Emmerdale were drawing larger audiences on UTV Ireland than on previous broadcasters, but admitted that their staff had gone "under the bonnet" to find means of improving the network's overall performance.-

On 19 October 2015, ITV plc announced its intent to acquire UTV Group's television business, including UTV Ireland, for £100 million, subject to regulatory approval. In December 2015, the deal was approved by the Broadcasting Authority of Ireland. The sale was completed on 29 February 2016, with the remainder of UTV Group operating as radio broadcaster Wireless Group (later sold to News UK).

On 11 July 2016, ITV plc announced that it had sold UTV Ireland to TV3 Group, a division of Virgin Media Ireland, for €10 million. As part of the deal, TV3 Group inherited UTV Ireland's ten-year programme supply contract with ITV (effectively re-uniting these rights with its previous owner). ITV director of operations and strategy Christy Swords stated that "Launching UTV Ireland last year represented a significant achievement by the teams in Dublin and Belfast in challenging circumstances", but that when ITV plc took over the network, they "concluded that bringing TV3 and UTV Ireland together under common ownership offers the best prospect of delivering a strong and sustainable Irish commercial broadcaster, underpinned by a long-term programming agreement with ITV". Virgin Media Ireland had acquired TV3 in 2015, and had begun to make major investments in the broadcaster.

=== be3 ===
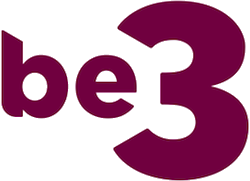
Be3 logo (9 January 2017 – 30 August 2018)

On 22 November 2016 it was announced that Coronation Street and Emmerdale would move back to TV3 beginning 5 December 2016. The next day, it was announced that UTV Ireland would be re-launched as be3 on 9 January 2017, as part of a wider re-branding of all three TV3 channels with new positioning and lineups. The re-branded channel would be primarily aimed towards women, and it was also announced that TV3's children's strand would also be moved to the channel. In the lead-up to the re-branding, the channel's operations were consolidated at the TV3 Group's main studio in Ballymount. Many of UTV Ireland's employees were laid off, but 40 new positions were offered within the TV3 Group.

=== Virgin Media Three ===
In June 2018, it was announced that be3 would be rebranded as Virgin Media Three on 30 August 2018, as part of a rebranding of all three TV3 channels under the Virgin Media brand.

As of September 2024, The channel is voiced by Dave Cronin, who is the sole continuity announcer.

== Programming ==
When branded as UTV Ireland, the channel relied heavily on acquired ITV programming, but also broadcast some Irish-produced programming. Under the be3 brand, the channel was targeted towards women.

=== News and current affairs ===
Ireland Live was UTV Ireland's national news and current affairs service, airing two programmes at 5:30 and 10:00 p.m. on weeknights, and news cut-ins during Good Morning Britain. The station did not broadcast any weekend news programming, apart from morning weather forecasts.

Following the re-launch as be3, Ireland Live was replaced by the relaunched 3News Ireland service. Mick McCaffrey, who led the Ireland Live news operation, was retained and made head of the new division, which produces bulletins for all three TV3 channels.

=== Children's ===
3e's children's strand 3Kids moved to be3 upon its launch.

=== Entertainment ===
Pat Kenny, former host of The Late Late Show, presented a chat show called Pat Kenny in the Round, which was axed after one series. Kenny also hosted the station's launch night special, Out with the Old – In with the U, on New Year's Day 2015.

In July 2015, UTV Ireland began airing a weekly entertainment news bulletin with the station's weather presenter, Jenny Buckley, called The Pulse. The programme was sponsored by Diet Coke. The feature was extended into a weekly 30-minute magazine show in January 2016. As be3, Xposé moved over to the channel on Tuesday and Wednesday nights.

=== Lifestyle ===
UTV Ireland aired Republic of Ireland versions of two of UTV's local programmes in the North, including travel documentary series Lesser Spotted Journeys with Joe Mahon (a spin-off of Lesser Spotted Ulster), and agriculture programme Rare Breed.

=== Acquired programming ===
==== As UTV Ireland ====
UTV's decision to enter the Republic's market followed the acquisition of broadcast rights to ITV programmes such as Coronation Street and Emmerdale from rivals TV3. UTV's Northern Ireland service had enjoyed a large following in the Republic up until the 2000s but its audience share had diminished following the arrival of Sky TV, which does not carry UTV. The company had profited greatly from high audience ratings in the Republic due to spillover and cable connections in the 1980s and 1990s.

By and large, UTV Ireland replicated the Northern Ireland service, with some variations due to domestic programme rights for programmes not produced by ITV Studios (such as The X Factor, whose rights were held by TV3). The Graham Norton Show also aired on the channel on a delay from its UK broadcast on BBC One. Daytime programmes such as The Jeremy Kyle Show, Lorraine, This Morning and Loose Women also aired. The Jeremy Kyle Show has previously aired on TV3, while Loose Women also aired on TV3 for a period during 2008. ITV's flagship breakfast show, Good Morning Britain, was added to the station's lineup in February 2015. With Ireland Live updates being shown at 6:15, 7:15 and 8:10. Good Morning Britain simulcasts on the channel ended on Friday 6 January 2017. UTV Ireland also utilised ITV's back catalogue of programming, including drama series such as Vera, All3Media's Midsomer Murders and Foyle's War. When ITV announced they were buying UTV Ireland, ITV CEO Adam Crozier said he intended to strengthen the channel further with high-quality ITV programming at its core.

==== As be3 ====
be3 airs many of ITV's drama programming and live studio shows, following a 10-year agreement between ITV plc and the TV3 Group. The channel also airs repeats of US court series Judge Judy and several ITV shows, such as Loose Women (live), Dickinson's Real Deal, Surprise Surprise, Who's Doing the Dishes?, The Cube and The Chase.

Acquired drama series include Wentworth and Bull. It also airs ITV dramas and comedies such as Benidorm, Doc Martin, Endeavour, Birds of a Feather, Midsomer Murders, Prime Suspect, Grantchester and Vera.

As Virgin Media Three

After positioned as a channel with a focus on mainly airing dramas from the ITV library such as Heartbeat, Inspector Morse and Lewis. As of 2024, Like Virgin Media Four, The schedule also has repeats of programming from other Virgin Media channels, mainly from the libraries of ITV Studios.
