= Championship Live =

- Presented by: Matt Cooper
- Starring: Commentators: Mike Finnerty; Seán Walsh; Reporters: Sinéad Kissane; Kieran McSweeney
- Country of origin: Ireland
- Original language: English
- No. of seasons: 4
- No. of episodes: 39

Production
- Producer: Ciarán Ó hEadhra
- Camera setup: Multi-camera
- Running time: Variable
- Production company: Motive-Asgard

Original release
- Network: Virgin Media One
- Release: 1 June 2008 – present

Related
- Championship Throw-In; The GAA Show

Championship Live is Virgin Media One's main Gaelic games television programme. Typically, it is shown on Virgin Media One (formerly known as "TV3") on Saturday evenings and Sunday afternoons during the All-Ireland championships in both hurling and football, showing live coverage of the day's match.

== History ==
In 2007 it was announced that TV3 had signed a three-year deal with the Gaelic Athletic Association which would see the independent station broadcast thirty games between 2008 and 2010. While Setanta Sports and TG4 had shown National League and club championship games before, this was the first time since 1962 that senior inter-county championship games would not be screened exclusively on RTÉ. TV3 also announced that Championship Throw-In, a weekly magazine programme, would also be broadcast. All of the new GAA-themed programmes were launched at Croke Park on 15 May 2008.

Following the completion of the initial three-year deal in 2010, the GAA were satisfied to give TV3 an expanded role in Gaelic games broadcasting. A second three-year deal saw the station get exclusive rights to broadcast eleven matches, albeit only one match more than the original deal, however, the deal now included All-Ireland football quarter-finals and both All-Ireland minor finals.

=== Series 1 ===
For the first series the programme started an hour before throw-in and remained on air for an hour after the end of the game. Championship Live was broadcast for the first time on Sunday, 1 June 2008. The programme was broadcast live from the Gaelic Grounds in Limerick and featured the Munster Senior Hurling Championship quarter-final between Clare and Waterford. The other games broadcast during the first series were the Leinster Senior Football Championship quarter-final between Dublin and Louth, both Leinster Football Championship semi-finals, the Leinster Senior Hurling Championship final, the Connacht Senior Football Championship final, the Ulster Senior Football Championship final and one game each from the three rounds of the All-Ireland football qualifiers.

=== Series 2 ===
The second series of Championship Live followed the same format as the first series. Once again TV3 had exclusive rights to ten championship games. The opening programme of the second series was broadcast on 7 June 2009 and featured coverage of the Munster Senior Football Championship semi-final clash between Cork and Kerry. The other games covered live included one Munster Hurling Championship semi-final, one Leinster Senior Football Championship semi-final, the Munster Football Championship final, the Leinster Football Championship final, the Connacht Football Championship final and the Leinster Hurling Championship final. TV3 were also granted "first pick" rights to the last three rounds of the All-Ireland football qualifying rounds.

=== Series 3 ===
The first programme in the third series of Championship Live aired on 14 June 2010. Broadcast live from the studio in Croke Park, that programme featured the Leinster Football Championship quarter-final between Dublin and Wexford. The following week Championship Live broadcast their very first "double header" with a Leinster Hurling Championship semi-final and a Munster Hurling Championship semi-final. One week later the programme monopolised Gaelic games coverage once again with a "double header" featuring a Leinster Football Championship semi-final and a Connacht Football Championship semi-final. TV3 also had the exclusive rights to the Munster Football Championship final, the Connacht Football Championship final and also had "first pick" rights in the decisive qualifying rounds of the All-Ireland football qualifiers.

=== Series 4 ===
After the renewal of the broadcasting contract with the GAA, the first Championship Live of the fourth series aired on 5 June 2011. That programme was broadcast live from the Croke Park studio and featured the Leinster Football Championship quarter-final between Dublin and Laois. The other games covered live included one Munster Hurling Championship semi-final, the Leinster Hurling Championship final, the Connacht Football Championship final, the Ulster Football Championship final, "first pick" rights for the second and fourth rounds of the All-Ireland football qualifiers, two All-Ireland Football Championship quarter-finals and both All-Ireland minor finals.

== Presenters, pundits and commentators ==
Former newspaper editor and Today FM presenter Matt Cooper was unveiled as the presenter of Championship Live at the show's launch in 2008 while three guest panelists usually join him for each match.

The inaugural Championship Live team also included commentators Mike Finnerty and Trevor Welch, while TV3's Gaelic Games correspondent Kieran McSweeney and TV3 News's sports reporter Sinéad Kissane were included as sideline reporters. Welch left the Gaelic games programme in 2009 in favour of concentrating on TV3's soccer coverage. He was replaced by Seán Walsh from Galway Bay FM.

The programme's hurling analysts are Nicky English, Jamesie O'Connor, Liam Griffin and Daithí Regan. The football analysts are David Brady, Peter Canavan, Senan Connell, Paul Earley, Joe Kernan and Eugene McGee.
