= At Your Service (TV series) =

- Starring: Francis Brennan; John Brennan
- Country of origin: Ireland
- Original language: English
- No. of seasons: 14

Production
- Production location: Around Ireland
- Production company: Waddell Media

Original release
- Network: RTÉ One
- Release: 4 September 2008 – present

At Your Service is an Irish makeover television programme, the first series of which was broadcast (in eight parts) on RTÉ One in 2008. It is a creation of Waddell Media, who are behind How Long Will You Live? and Looking For Love.

Presented by expert hotelier brothers Francis and John Brennan of the five-star Park Hotel in Kenmare, County Kerry, the premise of the show is that business makeovers are given by the duo to B&Bs, guesthouses and small hotels across Ireland. The advice given covers various aspects of management, including staffing, catering arrangements, menus, room inspections and indoor and outdoor redecoration.

Francis is responsible for the main inspection, whilst John investigates financial issues, searches for new marketing opportunities and advises on how to develop in the future. Francis is particularly known for his meticulous attention to detail.

== Broadcast history ==
The first episode of the original series aired on 4 September 2008, whilst the final episode of that series aired on 23 October 2008.

At Your Service later returned for a second series.

The Brennans appeared together on chat show Tubridy Tonight on 18 October 2008.

There have since been further series.

The Brennans appeared together on The Saturday Night Show in January 2011.

== Episode list ==
=== Series 1 ===
Date of original airing	Venue revamped	Details
4 September 2008	Hayden's Hotel, County Wicklow	
11 September 2008	The Ravine Hotel, Lisdoonvarna, County Clare	
18 September 2008	The Beach Haven House and Hotel, Tramore, County Waterford	
25 September 2008	Lahinch Golf Lodge, Lahinch, County Clare	
2 October 2008	Tara Green B&B, Shannon, County Clare.	
9 October 2008	The Rectory, Shannon Harbour, County Offaly	
16 October 2008	Glenribbeen Lodge, Lismore, County Waterford	
23 October 2008	Cherryville House, County Kildare	Revisits were carried out for the 'Revisited' series at Episode 1 Lahinch Golf Lodge, County Clare. Episode 2 Glenribbeen Lodge, County Waterford. Episode 3 The Rectory, County Offaly. Episode 4 The Ravine Hotel, Lisdoonvarna, County Clare Episode 5 Poulaphouca House, County Wicklow. Episode 6 Beach Haven House and Hostel County Waterford.

=== Series 2 ===
Episode Number	Venue revamped
Episode 1	Creedon's Hotel, County Cork
Episode 2	Skylon Hotel, County Dublin
Episode 3	Portfinn Lodge & Fjord Restaurant, County Galway
Episode 4	Roundwood House, County Laois
Episode 5	Kincora House, County Clare
Episode 6	Coral Gables Guest House, Rosslare, County Wexford
Episode 7	Rockview Hotel, County Sligo
Episode 8	Smarmore Castle, County Louth

=== Series 3 ===
Episode Number	Venue revamped
Episode 1	Lough Key House, County Roscommon
Episode 2	The Royal Valentia, County Kerry
Episode 3	Ouvane Falls, County Cork
Episode 4	The Strand, County Clare
Episode 5	The Blue Door, County Wexford
Episode 6	Beirnes of Battlebridge Caravan & Camping Park, County Roscommon
Episode 7	Phoenix Park House, County Dublin
Episode 8	The Windsor Inn, County Cork

=== Series 4 ===
Episode Number	Venue revamped
Episode 1	The Phoenix, County Kerry
Episode 2	Harbour House, County Wexford
Episode 3	The Strand Inn, County Waterford
Episode 4	Crossogue House and Equestrian Centre, County Tipperary
Episode 5	The Olde Glenbeigh Hotel, County Kerry
Episode 6	Sean Collins and Sons Bar, County Limerick
Episode 7	Kilmahon House, County Cork
Episode 8	The Brosna Lodge Hotel, County Offaly

=== Series 5 ===
Episode Number	Venue revamped
Episode 1	Coolanowle Country House and B&B County Carlow
Episode 2	Hayden's Hotel, Ballinasloe, County Galway
Episode 3	St Helen's Bay Golf Club, Rosslare, County Wexford
Episode 4	Riverrun Cottages/Paddy's Bar, Terryglass, County Tipperary
Episode 5	The United Arts Club, County Dublin
Episode 6	The Old Imperial Hotel, Youghal, County Cork
Episode 7	Rossnaree House, Slane, County Meath
Episode 8	Kerry Coast Inn, Cahersiveen, County Kerry

=== Series 6 ===
Episode Number	Venue revamped
Episode 1	Breathnach's, Coachford, County Cork
Episode 2	Beaulieu House, Drogheda, County Louth
Episode 3	Millstreet Country Park, County Cork
Episode 4	Oranmore Castle, County Galway
Episode 5	Tinahely Farm Shop, County Wicklow
Episode 6	Django's Hostel, Cloughjordan & Cloughjordan Eco Village, County Tipperary
Episode 7	New Park Hotel, Athenry, County Galway
Episode 8	West County Hotel, Ennis, County Clare

=== Series 7 ===
(Broadcast January - March 2015)

Episode Number	Venue revamped
Episode 1	Ballyhannon House Riding School, Quin, County Clare
Episode 2	McGarrigle's Restaurant, Bundoran, County Donegal
Episode 3	Milltown House, Dingle, County Kerry
Episode 4	Sherkin North Shore, Sherkin Island, County Cork
Episode 5	Annesbrook House, Duleek, County Meath
Episode 6	The Beach Hotel, Mullaghmore, County Sligo
Episode 7	Riversdale, Ballinamore, County Leitrim
Episode 8	Termonfeckin, County Louth

=== Series 8 ===
(Broadcast in January - February 2016)

Episode Number	Venue revamped
Episode 1	Caroline Workman, Self-Catering Cottages, County Louth
Episode 2	McCarthy's Pub, Restaurant and Undertaker, County Tipperary
Episode 3	Curraghchase Caravan & Camping Park, County Limerick
Episode 4	Nuala's, County Clare
Episode 5	Hazelwood Lodge, Ballyvaughan, County Clare
Episode 6	Bluestack Community Centre & Hostel, Drimarone, County Donegal
Episode 7	Twin Trees Hotel, Ballina, County Mayo
Episode 8	Old Monastery Hostel, Letterfrack, County Galway

=== Series 9 ===
(Broadcast April - May 2017)

Episode Number	Venue revamped
Episode 1	Killarney View House, Killarney, County Kerry
Episode 2	Burtown House & Gardens, Athy, County Kildare
Episode 3	Grange Villa Country House, Fethard on Sea, County Wexford
Episode 4	Crookedwood House, Mullingar, County Westmeath
Episode 5	Wolfe Tones na Sionna GAA Club, Shannon, County Clare
Episode 6	Waterside Guesthouse & Restaurant, Graiguenamanagh, County Kilkenny
Episode 7	Portree House, Waterford City, County Waterford
Episode 8	Ted's Bar, Cashel, Achill Island, County Mayo

=== Series 10 ===
(Broadcast April - May 2018)

Episode Number	Venue revamped
Episode 1	Shankill Castle, Paulstown, County Kilkenny
Episode 2	Kiersey's Bar and Tearoom, Kilmacthomas, County Waterford
Episode 3	Lakeside Hostel, Augnacliffe, County Longford
Episode 4	Shore Acre Caravan Park, Tralee, County Kerry
Episode 5	Carrick Court Hotel, Carrickmacross, County Monaghan
Episode 6	Lisdoonvarna Failte, Lisdoonvarna, County Clare
Episode 7	The Hideout, Kilcullen, County Kildare
Episode 8	Dunmurry Springs Golf Club, Dunmurry Springs, County Kildare

=== Series 11 ===
(Broadcast April - May 2019)

Episode Number	Venue revamped
Episode 1	Irish Military Museum, Starinagh, County Meath
Episode 2	Carrick Camping, Carrick-on-Shannon, County Leitrim
Episode 3	Loftus Hall, Hook Peninsula, County Wexford
Episode 4	Vaughans, Kilfenora, County Clare
Episode 5	Limerick Travel, Limerick City, County Limerick
Episode 6	Loughcrew Estate, County Meath
Episode 7	Tracey's shop, Limerick City, County Limerick
Episode 8	Lough Lannagh Holiday Village, County Mayo

=== Series 12 ===
(Broadcast July - August 2022)

Episode Number	Venue revamped
Episode 1	K2Alpacas, Newtownmountkennedy, County Wicklow
Episode 2	The Smugglers Inn, Waterville, County Kerry
Episode 3	Dunmore East Holiday & Golf Resort, County Waterford
Episode 4	Sweeney’s Hotel, Dungloe, County Donegal

=== Series 13 ===
(Broadcast September - October 2024)

Episode Number	Venue revamped
Episode 1	The James Hotel, Tralee, County Kerry
Episode 2	Barnahown, Mitchelstown, County Cork
Episode 3	Pond Beach Resort, Errill, County Laois
Episode 4	Jewel Lodge & Spa, Glengarriff, County Cork

=== Series 14 ===
(Broadcast September 2026)

Episode Number	Venue revamped
Episode 1	Hill House, Cashel, County Tipperary
Episode 2	Walsh's Hotel, Cappoquin, County Waterford
Episode 3	Shanbally House & Gardens, Toomevara, County Tipperary
Episode 4	Cornamucklagh House, Omeath, Co Louth
