= Channel South =

Irish local TV channel

- Country: (Republic of Ireland) Ireland

Programming
- Picture format: 625 Lines PAL (analogue); 16:9/4:3, 576i SDTV (digital), 1080i (HDTV)

Ownership
- Owner: City Channel
- Sister channels: City Channel Dublin

History
- Launched: 10 November 2008

Links
- Website: www.channelsouth.ie

Channel South was an Irish television channel, operated by City Channel, transmitting 24-hour local programming to Cork, Limerick, and parts of counties Kerry, Waterford, Clare, and Tipperary since November 2008.

Included in the station's programs is an evening show called South Tonight presented by local celebrities.

== Background ==
Channel South was a cable television channel in Ireland, operating in Cork, Limerick, and parts of counties Kerry, Waterford, Clare, and Tipperary since November 2008. It has received a licence by the Broadcasting Commission of Ireland for cable and MMDS operation, and have secured carriage on the formerly NTL owned digital cable system in Dublin. It follows on from the first attempt at a commercial local television network in Ireland and the first attempt at a commercial cable-only channel in the country by its sister City Channel.

In November 2008, the channel was added to UPC Ireland's electronic programme guide on Channel 107, and programming began on 10 November 2008.

The company, which is headed by former RTÉ presenter David Harvey, also opened City Channels for Galway and Waterford in 2006, and this channel in time – together with City Channels Dublin and Waterford will have about 85% shared content with the rest being local content with Channel South operating 24 hours a day. Harvey also is a shareholder in independent local radio station Dublin's Country Mix 106.8.

== See also ==
- Media of the Republic of Ireland
- List of Irish television channels
