= Cable television in Ireland =

Cable television (originally known as "piped TV") in Ireland first started in 1963, when several companies, including the state broadcaster, RTÉ, started relaying the United Kingdom's terrestrial television channels in some cities and larger towns. Today, all Irish cities and many larger towns have cable networks.

== Technology ==
Ireland's cable television networks are now entirely digital. However, in many areas, Virgin Media Ireland carried a small number (approximately 16) analogue channels alongside digital services until 2019; while the two independent cable operators in Cavan and Longford carried significantly more analogue channels into the early 2020s.

The legacy analogue cable television services provided unencrypted PAL System I television channels. Frequency plans varied from place to place, and channels were carried in VHF Band I, Band III, Hyperband, and sometimes UHF Band IV.

In the past, additional encrypted premium analogue channels were also available. To view these channels a set-top box was required. Cablelink / NTL Ireland used Cryptovision, while some other companies, notably Cork Multichannel, used Jerrold (General Instrument) scrambling systems.

Cork City and other areas cabled by Cork Multichannel Television required a Jerrold (General Instrument) set top box for all channels. The entire Cork analogue cable network was encrypted from the late 1980s onward. The Cork network also carried more channels than other cable networks in Ireland at that time.

When digital cable was launched in Cork, Virgin Media Ireland rapidly swapped analogue set top boxes for digital boxes and then shut down the analogue service entirely. The network carried analogue terrestrial channels, RTÉ1, RTÉ2, TV3 and TG4 in some parts of the network until 2018. This means that Cork became the first city in Ireland to have an exclusively digital cable network.

For analogue cable in Ireland, there was no set frequency plan. Most cable networks for analogue used harmonically related carriers (carrier frequencies of exact 8 MHz multiples). Some cable networks such as Limerick used Irish terrestrial channel alignments or even a mixture of the two-channel plans.

The Virgin Media Ireland digital cable network operates using DVB-C, with a set top box required to view their television services. The two independently owned cable networks in Cavan and Longford use DVB-T and do not require a set top box.

Digital networks have far more sophisticated trunking systems. The five main cities (Dublin, Cork, Galway, Limerick, and Waterford), along with towns like Longford, Dungarvan, Clonmel, Thurles, Kilkenny etc. now enjoy state of the art Hybrid fibre-coaxial networks which are used to deliver a myriad of services, including digital television, broadband DOCSIS 3.0, and cable telephony services.

Overhead cables (strung between buildings rather than utility poles, as used in the United States) are common in areas constructed before the foundation of the local cable firm, or where the cable firm did not have a construction agreement with the builders; underground cables are more common in developments build post-1985.

== History ==
In the early years of television, Irish viewers had access to the BBC via signals coming from Northern Ireland and Wales. By 1959, Northern Irish viewers had access to one public service broadcaster (BBC) and one commercial broadcaster (Ulster Television). The Secretary of the Department of Posts and Telegraphs in the Republic, Leon Ó Broin, had tried to progress the idea of an Irish channel since 1953; this new medium coming from Northern Ireland spurred the Irish government into action. Teilifís Éireann began broadcasting on 31 December 1961. During these years many Irish radio listeners where listening to BBC Radio so the interest in BBC Television would continue; some had been watching since 1949 via spillover signals. The first cable service from RTÉ in 1963 was RTÉ Relays; these tests were in preparation for the building of the Ballymun apartment blocks, which were built during these early years of RTÉ Television. RTÉ Relays opted to provide their service with the BBC and Ulster Television (later, the Cablelink company would also provide HTV from Wales).

The first city outside Dublin to build a purpose-built cable television network under the new 1974 regulations was Waterford, which initially delivered service to some 6,000 homes in 1974. It supplied an analogue service to an estimated 14–16,000 homes in Waterford City, along with almost 5,000 cable broadband customers, including VoIP (Voice over Internet Protocol) telephony services.

Other cities followed suit, but not until the 1980s. First Cork in 1981, then Limerick in 1983, and Galway by 1985. However, due to legislation regarding the use of microwave links at the time, companies were forced to lay untold kilometres of cable to get from the headend to the city.

The cable connecting Cork to the Comeragh Mountains was 100 km (60 miles) in total: the longest cable television route ever built in Europe. The Casey Cablevision company of Dungarvan, County Waterford held the Irish record previously, with a 25 km (16 mile) line connecting to the Comeragh Mountains headend. Cork Communications (Cork Multichannel TV) had initially built a head-end in the Knockmealdown Mountains, but reception there was less than satisfactory and a deal was done after a few months in 1982 to use Casey Cablevision's headend.

The majority of major cable systems in Ireland now use fibre optics, however some smaller systems still use a mixture of microwave links, UHF antennae, and direct satellite feeds to local headends.

By the 1980s, cable television was well-established as the most popular multi-channel television reception system in Ireland. In addition to providing Irish and British terrestrial television, Irish CATV systems generally began adding additional services during the 1980s as English-language services started to appear on European satellites that were receivable in Ireland. This greatly enhanced the number of channels available to customers. Property developers also began to pre-wire new homes for cable service where it was available. By the end of the decade, cable television was more popular than both direct reception of UHF television from the UK and satellite television.

=== Timeline of when Irish cities and towns received cable ===
- 1971 - Dublin City
- 1975 - Waterford, Celbridge, Arklow, Dundalk, Longford and Cavan
- 1976 - Glenties, Enniscorthy and New Ross
- 1978 - Boyle, Sligo and Mullingar
- 1979 - Carlow, Greystones, Rush and Ashbourne
- 1980 - Navan Town
- 1981 - Clonard Estate, Dundrum, Athlone, Dungarvan, Cork City and Naas
- 1982 - Swords
- 1983 - Bagenalstonwn, Maynooth and Limerick City
- 1984 - Portlaoise, Clane, Tullamore, Kilkenny Town and Portarlington
- 1985 - Buncrana, Carrigaline, Ballina, Clonmel and Nenagh
- 1986 - Galway City, Donegal Town and Newbridge

Further towns such as Thurles, Tipperary, Tullow, Ennis, Castlebar, and Birr were cabled during the late 1980s.

The provision of cable television was regularly debated in the Irish parliament (Dáil Éireann) which set out details of years of cable licence operations in the country.

=== Multichannel ===
Long before any coaxial cable had been laid for the distribution of television in Ireland, the Irish were enjoying multi-channel television. Even before Teilifís Éireann had begun to broadcast, Irish viewers were watching the BBC and ITV. The BBC signal was available to 40% of the population in the Republic by the late 1950s. Many had already installed outdoor aerials to get signals from Northern Ireland or Wales. Not all of the country could get access to these British signals, so they were introduced to television by the new Irish television service Teilifís Éireann; by the time the 1960 Broadcasting Act had been produced, around 50,000 television set had been sold in Ireland. During this time Ireland experienced economic growth and the beginnings of Community Antenna Television (CATV) or cabled television broadcasts. RTÉ set up their relays service for viewers in Ballymun providing both the BBC and Ulster Television on their service known as RTÉ Relays. Even before the advent of Sky Digital in Ireland and later FTA UK Satellite, over 75% of households had ITV (UTV and/or HTV).

=== Laying Ireland's cable ===
There were two prevailing reasons for cable. The attraction of the British channels and hence more choice, and better reception for many people, analogue terrestrial signals covered about 90% of the population. Cable companies around Dublin (such as RTÉ Relays, Marlin Communal Aerials Ltd., and Phoenix Relays Ltd.) provided the three main British broadcasters at the time (later they would also provide Channel 4 and satellite channels).

Cablevision rolled out CATV systems in Waterford and Galway.

In 1981, Marlin Communal Aerials Ltd. acquired Phoenix Relays Ltd and formed Dublin Cablesystems Ltd. (DCS). The Canadian company Rogers Cable owned Cablevision and Dublin Cablesystems through their purchase of Perimer Cablevision in 1980. In 1984, RTÉ proposed to buy 75% of DCS in an aim to modernise cable systems that had an "urgent need for modernisation and development which was impossible under present conditions".

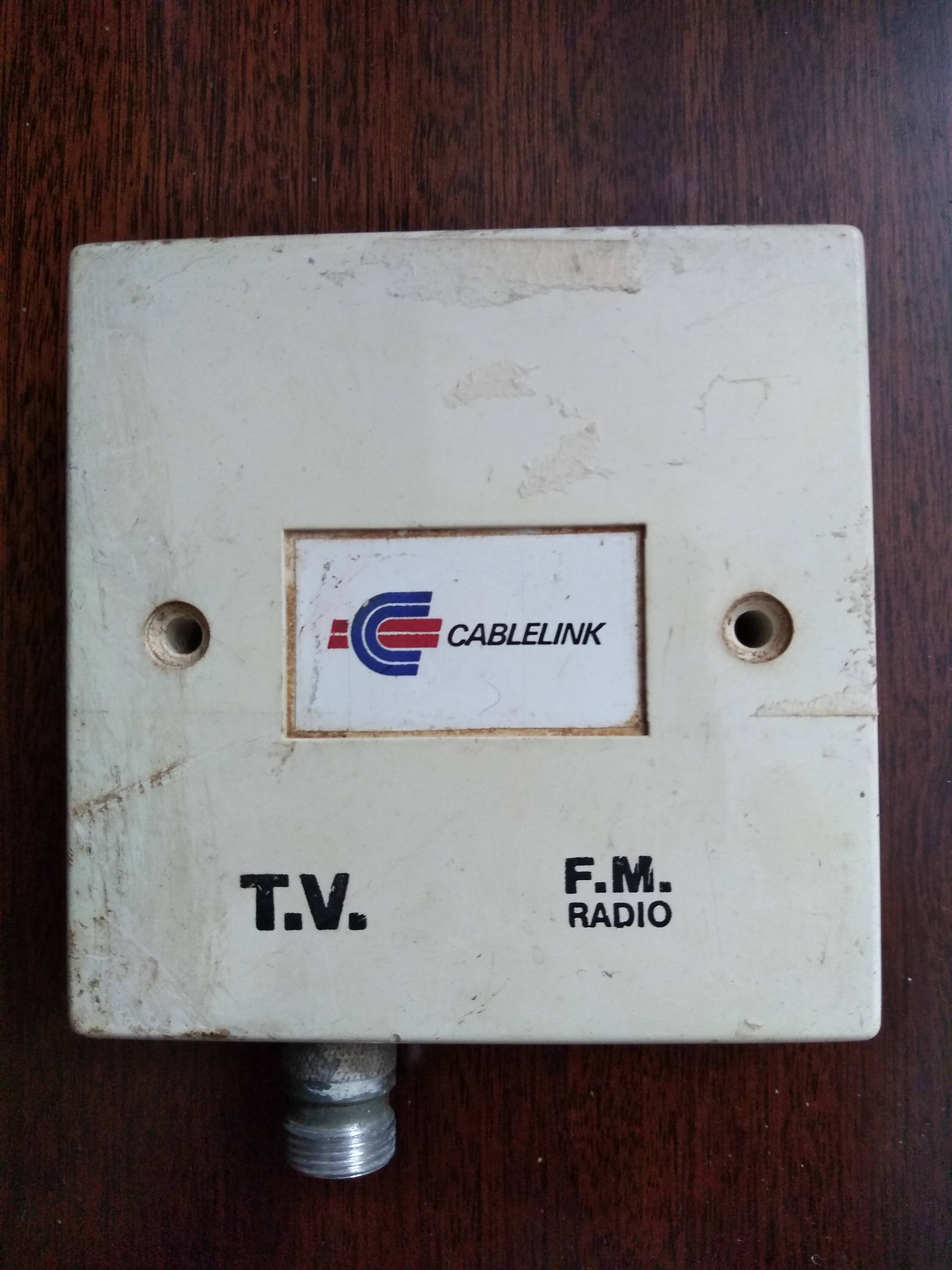
Cablelink TV F connector box

There was little regulation of cable systems during the early years; often it was there to redistribute British channels and improve RTÉ's reception. With this in mind, RTÉ was allowed buy a 75% share in DCS and 1986 formed Cablelink. Cablelink had approximately 200,000 subscribers. By 1990, almost 300,000 homes had cable subscriptions and the Government began to regulate the MMDS system.

==== MMDS (1990-2016) ====
MMDS was used to distribute multichannel television to non-cabled areas between 1989 and 2016. While "cable" television generally refers to services provided by cables, legally MMDS television distribution systems, which were widespread in some regions of rural Ireland, were classified as a form of "cable" television. The introduction of MMDS began in 1989, with the network of 29 cells forming a "national grid" being regulated for, if not intact, by 1998.

Analogue MMDS specifications were legally set in 1998 by the then Office of the Director of Telecommunications Regulation in the document "Technical conditions for the operation of analogue programme services distribution systems in the frequency band 2500-2686 MHz"

Virgin Media Digital MMDS used a DVB-C variant on ex NTL MMDS and a variant of DVB-T on ex Chorus MMDS networks.

One of the first MMDS operators provided 11 channels, but RTÉ One or Network 2 did not appear on the service, rather, their CEO insisted on the RTÉ News that customers could already receive those transmission terrestrially and his product was about providing more choice.

The introduction of MMDS proved controversial for a time in some rural areas which were accustomed to receiving multichannel services more cheaply via unlicensed UHF relay "deflector" or "rebeaming" systems. These operations were generally community operated, and technically illegal, however many of them were eventually licensed in 1999 following intense political lobbying. All deflector licences lapsed in 2012 with the switchover to digital television while all MMDS operations ceased in 2016.

=== The Report of the Cable Systems Committee of 1984 ===
The Report of the Cable Systems Committee of 1984 recommended the upgrading of the current cable systems in Ireland. There seemed at this time to be no mandate for community or local broadcasts. According to the Committee, Ireland's cable network had evolved to gain better access to "off-air" signals coming from Britain. In 1961, the limited use of aerials saw the development of Irish cable. In 1966, RTÉ was given the task of providing cabled services to the Ballymun area. Cable saw restrictions put in places as RTÉ sought to establish itself as a television broadcaster. Only areas with over-the-air access to ITV and BBC signals were permitted to have cable services (to improve receptions they already had); within those areas only one building or ten houses could use the one link; in 1970 this was increased to 500. This was to try to prevent RTÉ having a monopoly, but they remained in the market with RTÉ Relays.

In 1973, the government introduced a levy on all cable companies for 15% of their fee to be given to RTÉ due to losses incurred from advertising revenues. Any company with fewer than 100 subscribers were exempt from this levy. By 1974, 43 cable companies had been licensed. From 1981, new cable companies were allowed in areas without "off-air"/spillover signals. In 1985, 314,000 homes had access to cable television, with 80% of those homes taking up the services provided.

There was some unauthorized access to cable service by customers, which caused radio disruption, while older systems lacked the two-way communication while new cable had only some two-way communications. The Committee was advising that cable be treated as a national infrastructure and to be dealt with in a manner ready for the information age. It continued to suggest that new services such as local and community television, pay television, pay-per-view, and interactive services could be used on the cable networks. Direct Satellite Broadcasting was ready to begin in Europe by 1986. The Committee looked at both Belgium and Canada as they had similar take-up of cable as Ireland.

Cable was an integral part of Ireland Information Infrastructure and the Department of Communications took an active role in regulating it, technically and with regard to content.

In 1985, VHF band I and III were used to carry six television stations, while VHF band II carried radio stations, however, it was thought that up to 15 channels could be provided on the cable services. They were advised that 30-50 channels could be provided, but this would be at huge infrastructural costs, and was not in the interest of customers since many only had a 15-channel dial.

With the merger of RTÉ Relays and DCS many customers were beginning to see better reception due to the integration of both systems, Cablelink had begun to reduce head-ends which help with reception issues.

The Cable Systems Committee recommended further penetration of the network around the country. Issues surrounding copyrights were an issue, however, at this time the Television Without Frontiers Directive (TVWF) was being discussed in Europe. It was recommending that once content was legally transmitted in one jurisdiction that it should be permitted in others.

The Committee spent some time investigating interactivity; while it came to no conclusion about the need for interactive services, it did suggest that cable licensees set about upgrading their systems in case such services become popular in the future. The Committee also investigated planning laws; it was felt that each planning authority at the time had different rules for the laying of cable. There should be a more uniformed approach; they did not suggest that cable companies be given the status of utility companies, thus providing them with access to private property; they did suggest that those not wishing to have equipment on the premises should then be charged for the re-routing, should they ever want cable in the future. It was also pointed out that some local authorities put levies on cable systems, which cable companies were not aware of when applying for their licence, thus having the need to request price increases. It was not thought that unauthorised access should be made a criminal offence, rather, that cables should be placed underground as this had reduced unauthorised access in other countries. It was also felt that cables should be earthed to prevent any electrical danger to people in their homes.

At the time, RTÉ received a 15% percent levy from the cable companies for money lost through advertising revenue, as RTÉ now owned 80% of Cablelink, the largest cable supplier, it was thought that this should be reviewed as it had a near-monopoly in the country. Administration costs were also to be reduced and the Commission suggested that a six-monthly list of customers should be provided to the Department rather than a monthly one. Local advertisements provided on the cable company's line-up of channels should be allowed, however, the companies should have the same constraints as RTÉ Television.

By 1981, Dublin had two major cable companies, DCS and RTÉ relays, and a few smaller companies around the city. Allied Combined Trust (ACT), a subsidiary of Allied Irish Investment Bank, held 20% of Cablelink by 1986, while 80% was held by RTÉ. The Minister for Communications Jim Mitchell asked for a review of the restrictive practices in Dublin caused by a virtual monopoly that had been built by the new company.

The takeover of the DCS system by RTÉ Relays had been approved and a number of reasons for the merger were put forward:

1. A more integrated approach to Dublin cable which had grown in a patchwork of different companies
2. A new primary network was to be laid covering 140 km (90 miles), with 80 km (50 miles) underground
3. A new technical processing centre in Terenure, Dublin to provide other services
4. Cells of 3,000 homes
5. Increased number of stations available to the public

New set-top boxes could be used to provide free satellite channels, Pay television, Pay-per-view, and interactive services.

The issues surrounding the monopoly insisted that the cable company had some competition from other sources:

1. RTÉ One and RTÉ Two are available free-to-air
2. BBC 1, BBC2, UTV, HTV, S4C, and Channel 4 were available through roof-top aerials
3. Direct satellite broadcasters were currently broadcasting direct-to-home satellite systems

However,

1. It was felt that RTÉ One and RTÉ Two were not sufficient
2. There was limited use of rooftop aerials for the British channels
3. It was at that time illegal to own a satellite dish

It was felt that more than one operator would provide smaller areas and two to a house was unworkable, it did not matter how many cable companies were available since most areas would only ever have one those providing a monopoly in that area.

The Committee wanted local television to be defined; Cablelink pointed out that within the network each area was made up of 3,000 cells so this would not be an issue should areas require their own local television service. The company was also in good finances; some smaller operators could go out of business due to the high cost of maintaining their network. There was also a feeling that the CEO of a larger company did not listen to their customers as they were so far removed from the customer, small local cable companies had the CEO as the area manager. By 1986, Cablelink had made no approaches to the Minister for the addition of services via satellite; there was a suggestion that RTÉ was preventing new services from appearing on screen, however, Cablelink insisted that it wanted to launch the services across Dublin rather than in bits and pieces as it upgraded their network.

=== Timeline of the Cable and MMDS industry ===
1963: Marlin cables part Ballymun

1968: RTÉ with its subsidiary RTÉ Relays cables the Ballymun Flats.

1970s: Phoenix and Marlin merge to form Dublin Cablesystems (DCS) owned by Rogers Cable Canada

1980 Premier Cablevision is bought by Rogers Cable which owns Cablevision Waterford and Galway

In the early 1980s, Westward cable provides cable to Limerick City; Cork city is cabled by Cork Communications

1990s Princes Holding buy Cork Communications and rebrand as Limerick and Cork Multichannel

CMI: Cable Management Ireland begin to buy up small town franchises

1990s RTÉ sells a 60% share of Cablelink to Telecom Éireann; in 1999, both are forced to sell their shares; NTL buys Cablelink.

Mid 1990s: Cork and Limerick Multichannel become Irish Multichannel 2000: Irish Multichannel buy CMI and Nore-Suir Relays and rebrand as Chorus

2004: Independent Newspapers sell their 50% of chorus to Liberty Global

2007: Virgin Media sells NTL Ireland to Liberty Global. The two largest cable companies in Ireland merge and form Chorus NTL owned by UPC.

2013: Liberty Global announced that they had agreed to buy Virgin Media for approximately US$23.3 billion (£15 billion) in a stock and cash merger.

2015: It was announced that UPC Ireland would be rebranded as Virgin Media Ireland. The name change took place on 5 October.

Several smaller providers remain in some smaller towns, the biggest being Casey Cable in Dungarvan which was set up in the 1970s.

Casey TV was bought out by Virgin Media in 2018.

== Regulation ==
Originally, responsibility for licensing and regulating cable services in Ireland lay with the Department of Posts and Telegraphs. Nowadays, COMREG is the body responsible.

Early cable television operated in an unregulated grey market, with providers laying cables wherever possible from their signal collection point, often the local electrical store. The system was eventually regulated by the Wireless Telegraphy (Wired Broadcast Relay Licence) Regulations of 1974 into an exclusive franchise system, where one company holds a franchise to provide analogue cable television and radio services to a specific area. Franchisers under this system are referred to as having "1974 licences" The legal term for these early systems was "wired broadcast relay systems".

Further modifications to the Wireless Telegraphy Act allowed for the start of MMDS in 1989.

The major revision of the legislation, Wireless Telegraphy (Programme Services Distribution) Regulations of 1999, brought in a new class of licence. This introduced the concept of non-exclusive franchises, which had existed in theory with competing cable and MMDS firms in certain areas, and allowed for the introduction of digital cable and MMDS transmission.

Cable companies are obliged to carry national terrestrial television and RTÉ radio by both Regulations, although analogue MMDS operators were exempted from carrying all but TV3 of these.

Regulation includes free-to-air and commercial DTT, on a similar footing to cable and satellite in terms of copyright, regulations and so forth under the Broadcasting Act 2009.

== Local television ==
Cork Multichannel ran a local television station on its cable network called "The Show Channel" or "The Local Channel". It had a wide range of local programming and text-based community notices. This channel was carried on the Cork cable system from 1988 onwards. The company built studios at its headquarters on Georges Quay. This channel became "Chorus Sport" when Cork Multichannel merged with other companies to form Chorus.

Show Channel / Local Channel content included local entertainment programmes, music-video programmes presented by local VJs, community programming focusing on culture and history, cookery programmes and also hosted a live phone-in chat show. The channel also provided extensive coverage of local sport events. Its presenters included TV3's Trevor Welsh and RTÉ's Marty Morrissey. When the channel was not on air, community notices with text and graphics were shown. The channel also carried commercial advertising for the local broadcast area.

In 1995, the National Newspapers of Ireland (NNI) successfully prevented Cablelink from selling local advertising on some of the channels on their network, however it is unlikely that they would have been allowed to provide such opt-outs by the channel owners.

Some local television did run during the 1990s. Cablelink's "Link Channel" shared space with The Children's Channel. "Link" provided some local news in Dublin, Waterford, and Galway. It also ran local text advertisements during its off hours (while broadcasting Sky radio)

In Waterford City, Cablelink's Cabletext service (a rolling noticeboard, which included programming such as the Munster Game and CTV) ran uninterrupted from 1988 until it was replaced by City Channel in 2007. A highly successful and popular service, it was voluntarily staffed exclusively by local Cablelink engineers. It was in essence a truly local service. It also carried a programme called 'Waterford at 8' for several years which also proved very popular.

== Use of cable today ==
Virgin Media Ireland (like most other cable operators in the world) provides what NTL initially marketed as triple play: Telephone, television and internet access. This has become a reality in more recent years with 25% of their customers buying their broadband package and 11% buying their telephony package. This caused Virgin Media to make major infrastructural developments in the old networks which had been badly maintained by both the owners and not regulated by any government bodies. Ireland has several small independent CATV operators around the country - the biggest provider is that of Cablecomm in Longford. The rest of the country is covered by Virgin Media.

As of April 2019, analogue cable is no longer available in Dublin.

== Northern Ireland ==
Cable television in Northern Ireland is regulated by the UK regulator OFCOM Introduced in the late 1990s, for a long time it was originally only available in parts of Belfast and Derry. In the late 2010s, it was being introduced to other large towns. Virgin Media (formerly NTL/Cabletel) is the licensed provider; their network is entirely underground and offers telecom/broadband services alongside multichannel television.

== Subscriptions ==
Virgin Media Subscriptions
Date	Digital TV	Other TV	Total
2009 Q4	315,500		
2010	381,000		
2011 Q2	384,000		
2012	382,200		
2013	338,300	88,700	427,000
