= City Channel Dublin =

- Country: Ireland
- Headquarters: Dublin

Ownership
- Owner: City Channel
- Sister channels: Channel South

History
- Launched: 4 October 2005
- Closed: September 2011

City Channel Dublin was a cable television channel operating in Dublin, Ireland licensed by the Broadcasting Commission of Ireland for cable and MMDS operation. It had carriage on the formerly NTL owned digital cable system in Dublin. It was the first attempt at a commercial local television network and commercial cable-only channel in the country. City Channel Dublin closed in September 2011 after filing for bankruptcy.

On 16 September 2005 the channel was added to NTL Ireland's electronic programme guide on Channel 107, and programming began on 4 October.

The company was headed by former Radio Telefís Éireann (RTÉ) presenter David Harvey and opened City Channels for Galway and Waterford in early 2006 with about 85% shared content with the rest being local content. Programming from the Dublin channel was shared between the channels.

Twenty people (in addition to presenting staff) were employed in a purpose-built station in Sandyford industrial estate, Dublin.

The channel's programming lineup included a Polish language magazine show, partially imported from TVP, called Oto Polska, televised coverage of FM104's Adrian Kennedy Phone Show and a magazine show for the LGBT community called Free To Express.

In August 2011 the company denied rumours that it was to end broadcasting due to financial problems but then closed shortly afterwards.

== Television shows ==
City Channel Dublin featured many of the television shows common across regional City Channel broadcasts, including some shows which were unique to City Channel Dublin. Some of these programs are listed below.

The Warehouse was a City Channel Dublin exclusive hosted by Erich King. Each episode featured interviews with local musicians, actors and comedians. The show would finish with a musical jam session, where musicians interviewed would all play their respective instruments, with King joining in on the triangle. The show ran for 5 episodes until the station permanently shut down in September 2011.

Better Health was hosted by Lisa Cannon. This show focused on the sexual health of the nation with a particular focus on young people.

Travel Abroad was also hosted by Lisa Cannon and focused on budget travel options around Europe.
