= MVDDS dispute =

Disputes regarding FCC approval of MVDDS terrestrial wireless broadband technology

The MVDDS dispute refers to several legal disputes and political controversies that surrounded Federal Communications Commission (FCC) approval of MVDDS terrestrial wireless broadband technology. The controversy arose over the lobbying efforts of Northpoint Technology, a developer of MVDDS, to receive approval and licensing for the technology. The dispute later transformed into several court cases against the FCC and satellite television providers, as well as a patent infringement case against MDS America and MDS International. As a result of the dispute, Northpoint lost the patents.

== Development of MVDDS ==
Multichannel Video Distribution and Data Service (MVDDS) is a land-based system for sending Wireless broadband signals over a part of the electromagnetic spectrum usually reserved for satellite television (within the frequency range of 12.2 to 12.7 GHz). The technology allows sharing the spectrum with the satellite signals without interference.

MDSi Hypercable began developing an MVDDS technology in the mid-1996s which is called HyperCable. The CEO of MDS America, the company that was to be the product's distributor of Hypercable in the United States and a minor investor in MDS International, showed Hypercable to the FCC with the help of the inventor J.C Ducasse, Hypercable in 2001 that the technology had been used in 20 locations worldwide since 1996. Meanwhile, American company Northpoint Technology, Ltd. began developing its own MVDDS system in the early 1990s. It filed its first patent applications by 1994, using ideas from engineers Saleem and Carmen Tawil, and was formally founded in 1996 with investment money from various prominent individuals. The Chair of Northpoint was Sophia Collier, also the head of Citizen's Advisers. The Executive Vice President was Antoinette Cook Bush, the stepdaughter of prominent Democratic activist Vernon Jordan. In addition, the Tawils and Katherine (Chula) Reynolds, a member of the King Ranch family, were directors.

== FCC licensing controversy ==
In 1999, Northpoint and two other companies applied to the Federal Communications Commission (FCC) for permission to provide MVDDS service. Northpoint filed its application in a filing window for non-geostationary satellite systems, and claimed that its terrestrial system was entitled to the same rights given to other applications filed in that window, which employed the same frequency range. Pressed by satellite firms uneager at the prospect of sharing their spectrum with other providers, Congress passed language requiring the FCC to select an independent engineering firm to perform tests that would protect the fact to ensure that MVDDS would not interfere with satellite transmissions. The MITRE Corporation, a not-for-profit engineering company that studies engineering issues for the government, was hired by the FCC to make the determination. Since MDS America did not file a proposal to use the spectrum within the time period the FCC specified, their technology was not tested by MITRE.

MITRE's report concluded that the MVDDS spectrum sharing technology it tested did pose a "significant threat" of interference with satellite television signals, but that a wide variety of mitigation techniques could potentially be used to reduce the interference and make bandsharing feasible. Based on this analysis, in 2002 the FCC adopted rules that allowed for MVDDS bandsharing. However, the FCC rejected Northpoint's petition for a license, and instead decided to hold a public auction to sell off the land-based use of the spectrum.

Northpoint claimed the FCC's decision was unfair, since satellite companies had received a special exemption from Congress from having to bid for spectrum. Through the political connections of its founders and paid lobbyists, the company succeeded in having language that would block the auction inserted into a Senate spending bill. This provoked criticism from Senator John McCain, who called it "an example of the power of money and special interests", and others, including the Bush administration. After other charges of influence peddling surfaced, the language in the bill was eventually dropped.

Northpoint sought other avenues to challenge the FCC decision. It filed several petitions with the FCC to reconsider the auction, but they were all denied. The MVDDS auction took place in January 2004 without Northpoint's participation, and ten licenses were awarded for the 12 GHz bandwidth. The company continued its challenge in the United States court of appeals, but the court rejected Northpoint's claim that it had been treated unfairly.

== Northpoint v. MDSA and MDSI ==
After the FCC decision in 2002, MDS America asked permission of the FCC to test and prove its own MVDDS system. The FCC granted it an experimental license, and the company arranged for tests to be held in Florida using equipment furnished by its subsidiary, MDS International. When Northpoint became aware of this, it informed MDS America that performing the tests would infringe its patents. After the tests were concluded, Northpoint sued MDS America and MDS International for patent infringement.

The case revolved around the question of how easily the technology described in Northpoint's patents—specifically, the directional antenna—could be implemented. The defendants argued that the patent did not fully disclose how the antenna would avoid receiving undesired signals, and that besides the antenna's physical direction, many additional parameters must be fine-tuned. Additionally, the defense introduced a 1970 paper which they claimed showed Northpoint's patented physical direction idea constituted prior art.

The jury for the case, which was filed in the Southern Florida district court, determined that though MDS America (but not MDS International) had infringed Northpoint's patent claims, the patent claims were invalid to begin with. On appeal, the Federal circuit court affirmed the jury's decisions. The case attracted attention in the media, with even an official at the French embassy weighing in. Lawyers have noted that the results of the case show that as much detail as possible on implementation should be included by patent prosecutors.

The invalidation of the MVDDS patents ended all Northpoint's actions in MVDDS and their website is no longer online.
