= Bubble Hits Ireland =

Irish television music channel

Bubble Hits

Ownership
- Owner: Creative Sounds Limited

History
- Launched: 19 May 2008
- Closed: 13 February 2009

Bubble Hits Ireland was a short-lived Irish owned digital television music channel operated by Creative Sounds. Bubble Hits Ireland aim to be a much-needed platform for Irish bands and artists to showcase their music alongside the current programming and music structure of Bubble Hits. It was the first 24/7 Irish music TV station. On 13 February 2009, Bubble Hits went off air and was removed from most of the TV EPGs. The websites, including the official one and social networking versions on MySpace and Bebo were also removed. The closure of the channel was due to the current downturn in advertising revenue.

== History ==
Bubble Hits Ireland was originally scheduled to be launched in October 2007, but instead was launched on 19 May 2008.

== Location ==
The company and its studios are located in Ashbourne, County Meath, Ireland. They also have studios based in London, UK. The channel is broadcast free-to-air, therefore viewers do not need to have a Sky subscription to view the channel. Despite being Irish-owned, it is not licensed by the Broadcasting Commission of Ireland (BCI) but instead by the UK's Ofcom to "Creative Sounds UK", who are based in Northchapel.

== Availability ==
The channel was carried by Sky Digital, UPC Ireland, Magnet Entertainment, Smart Vision and SCTV. It was also expected that the channel would air on the Irish digital terrestrial television service launching in Autumn 2009.

== Former shows on Bubble Hits ==
Chartshows

- Bubble Euro Top 30 – The official European Top 30 chart, videos selected from 11 European countries.
- Bubble Hits Irish Top 30 – The official Irish Top 30, featuring the top 30 videos from the highest selling singles of the week.

Playlists

- Poptastic Hits – The latest pop hits
- iBubble – interactive request show
- Bubble Fresh – brand new video show sponsored by iMTV
- Pop Pop Pop – non-stop pop video show sponsored by Ryanair.com
- Most Wanted – daily chart show of the highest requested songs of the day.

News an entertainment

- Glenda's Showbiz Gossip – nightly entertainment news updates every night from 18:00 - 22:00.

Specialist programming

- Bubble Hits at Oxegen 2008
- Live at the Marque

=== Former presenters ===
- Glenda Gilson
- Liam McKenna
