= City Channel =

Irish television network

- Country: Ireland
- Broadcast area: Dublin, Galway, Cork and Waterford
- Headquarters: Dublin

Programming
- Language: English
- Picture format: PAL I standard

Ownership
- Owner: City Channel Ltd. & Liberty Global

History
- Launched: October 2005
- Closed: 13 March 2012
- Replaced by: RTÉ One +1

Availability

Terrestrial
- Irish analogue: N/A
- Saorview: N/A

City Channel was an Irish television network that began broadcasting in October 2005, which focused primarily on local and regional television. It operated three stations: City Channel Dublin, City Channel Galway, and Channel South. The channel was replaced by RTÉ One +1 on 13 March 2012.

== Launch ==
City Channel was given a licence by the BCI (now the BAI) on 31 January 2005 and began broadcasting in October 2005.

City Channel was originally launched on the NTL and Chorus cable services in Dublin, Galway and Waterford, however all four services were available on the digital services of UPC Ireland. The company was also granted a licence for a fourth station called City 7, which would have been targeted at Dublin's Eastern European communities.

== Programmes ==
The Evening Show was City Channel's prime time early evening entertainment programme. It was presented by Jimmy Greeley, who also has radio programme on 4fm, and Olive Geoghegan. It was broadcast daily from Monday to Friday at 7pm and covered a wide range of topics.

The Guest List was City Channel's entertainment programme. Presented by Judy Gilroy and Olive Geoghegan, the show features a strong mix of red carpet, fashion and music events.

Gay Nation was tailored specifically to the needs and tastes of the Gay Community. Each episode tackled the big issues affecting everyday gay life in Ireland, from marriage equality to job security. The programme aimed to appeal to all sections of the enormously diverse gay population and is presented by Joe Kearney.

The Evening Show: Extra was a compilation of the best bits of City Channel's flagship programme 'The Evening Show'. Presented by Judy Gilroy, this programme took a look back at some of the most memorable moments of City Channel's flagship show.

"The Warehouse" was a show hosted by newcomer to the presenting scene, Erich King. Each episode featured an interview with a comedian and a band which was great for new talent as bands and comedians were getting the chance to showcase their talent on a regional station, exposing them to many more people than usual. This was a new show to the station and lasted for 5 episodes before the channel closed down in September 2011.

== Ownership ==
The company was headed by David Harvey, who also founded the original station and is based in Dublin.

In August 2007, Liberty Ventures, a subsidiary of Liberty Global, purchased a 35% stake in the company, saying that they were looking to expand the City Channel format to Central and Eastern Europe.

In January 2010 it was announced that City Channel received €400,000 from its investors. The investment will be used to provide security for any difficult trading that may occur during 2010 for the channel, for a new joint venture with a UK partner and to help their fledgling production company city productions, which currently produces Xccelerate for 3e. It is hoped that such productions can be repeated on City Channel. Like the other Irish channels launched between 2005 and 2008, it has been through a "major trauma", Setanta Ireland having closed their UK channels, Channel 6 and Bubble Hits closing down.

In August 2011, City Channel announced they were in financial difficulties and were to begin to look to restructure their business. In September 2011, it was announced that City Channel will close. Towards the end David Harvey owned 45%, while 35% was owned by Liberty Global owners of UPC Ireland. The channel had hoped to be in the Black by 2008, however the economic climate in Ireland caused problems for the channel since 2009 with advertising sales plummeting by 50%. UPC will continue to broadcast the channel until its closure, and hopes to find a replacement for subscribers.

The channel ceased all operations on 13 March 2012, when the channel was replaced by RTÉ One +1 on the UPC Ireland EPG.

== Stations ==
=== City Channel Dublin ===
City Channel Dublin was the first service to be launched, beginning broadcasting in October 2005. The station carried Dublin-specific programmes such as hourly news bulletins between 16:00 and 22:00 and a number of magazine programmes, in addition to what was available on the other channels.

=== City Channel Galway ===
City Channel Galway logo

City Channel Galway launched in March 2006 after the initial success of the Dublin station. For the most part, the station broadcast the same programmes, with the exception of hourly news bulletins between 18:00 and 20:00, which focused on Galway City and County, and a number of magazine shows.

=== Channel South ===
City Channel Waterford launched in March 2006 as well, but was expanded and renamed in November 2008 as Channel South, and was available in several counties: Clare, Cork, Kerry, Limerick, Tipperary and Waterford. The station shared a large amount of programming with City Channel, but also produced a number of its own programmes focusing on the south of the country, such as South Tonight, a daily news bulletin.

=== City 7 ===
Also referred to as City Channel Eastern Europe, City 7 was to be launched in early 2009 and would have screen programmes aimed at the large section of the Dublin community who are originally from Eastern Europe. The company's other stations already carried programmes, such as Oto Polska, which was a partial collaboration with the Polish broadcaster Telewizja Polska.

Due to cutbacks it was delayed until further notice.
