= South Coast Television =

South Coast TV was a television deflector and MMDS service operating in County Cork, Ireland. Its headquarters were in Carrigaline.

== History ==
South Coast TV was founded in 1985 as the Carrigaline Community Television Project, to provide a multi-channel TV service to the people of Carrigaline initially, and later much of the rest of County Cork who, at the time, were unable to receive cable service. The service was operated using an antenna array, erected in the Comeragh mountains, which was then relayed to Carrigaline for further transmission around the county.

The service initially provided just one channel (HTV Wales), but was quickly followed by BBC One and BBC Two. Eventually, the fourth Welsh channel was added, S4C. From the early 1990s, the service was able to carry up to six channels with one or two of Sky1, Sky News or Eurosport in addition to the four terrestrial channels. Some southcoast affiliates also carried LTV -a local service from Macroom.

The service from the originating transmitter was initially powered by tractor batteries (replaced every few days by volunteers), until a long (approx 3 km) power cable was laid with voluntary effort to the site some months later.

Digital satellite was introduced in 2001 with BBC One Northern Ireland replacing BBC One Wales, BBC Two Northern Ireland replacing BBC Two Wales, and Channel 4 replacing S4C. SCTV's analogue UHF service was always effectively a free-to-air service, and could be received by anyone within coverage using an appropriate domestic UHF aerial installation. The service relied on the goodwill of viewers to pay the annual sum of money sought by the operators. The service initially operated illegally and suffered occasional harassment from the authorities (in the form of raids) and rival licensed operators (in the form of court injunctions) but after a long campaign was awarded an official licence in 1999. Around the same time similar operations were licensed in other parts of Ireland - particularly Mayo and Donegal.

After a share-offer to raise finance, a digital MVDDS service (SCTV Digital) operating at 12 GHz, using a system built by MDS America, with more than 60 channels was launched by SCTV in September 2006 with plans for broadband. This coincided with its conversion to a commercial enterprise. The service failed however as a result of free-to-air (satellite) coverage of UK channels, lower cost options via Sky, UPC and Freesat and slow rollout. Complete line-of-sight was required to the transmitter for the new service. Some prospective viewers also declined the new service as it was hoped by many that Ireland's imminent national DTT service would provide UK channels at low cost (it doesn't). SCTV Digital went bankrupt in mid-2010 because of these problems.

Transmission of premium channels stopped in June 2010, and was replaced by a message that told viewers it was shutting down. The service was fully shut down in Autumn 2010. The boxes have since been sold or recycled.

Most of Ireland's other deflector systems ceased operation in 2012 as part of the general shutdown of analogue based services. Proposals for a digital based replacement having never been realised.
