= HGN =

HGN may refer to:

- Halogen Software, Canada
- Horizontal gaze nystagmus, a field sobriety test.
- Hougang MRT station (MRT station abbreviation), in Singapore
- Hough Green railway station, in England
- Hyperbolic geometric network
- Mae Hong Son Airport, in Thailand
