= Bubble Hits =

Ownership
- Owner: Creative Sounds Limited

History
- Launched: 14 August 2006
- Closed: 13 February 2009

Bubble Hits was an Irish digital television music channel owned by Creative Sounds. It broadcast two channels, one for Ireland, and a Pan-European feed which covered the United Kingdom, Hungary, Romania, Poland and Germany. On 13 February 2009, Bubble Hits went off air and was removed from most of TV EPGs. The websites, including the official one and social networking versions on MySpace and Bebo were also removed. The closure of the channel was due to the current downturn in advertising revenue.

== Location ==
Bubble Hits studios were located in Ashbourne, County Meath, Ireland at the Creative Sounds studios. The channel was broadcast free-to-air, therefore viewers did not need to have a Sky subscription to view it. Despite being Irish-owned, it was not licensed by the Broadcasting Commission of Ireland (BCI) but instead by the UK's Ofcom to "Creative Sounds UK", who are based in Northchapel. This is not unusual amongst Irish channels, as well as those from other countries with restrictive broadcasting legislation, such as Sweden. The decision may also have been due to BCI's requirements that a significant percentage of programming must be Irish-produced.

== Advertising ==
Originally Bubble Hits claimed to be Europe's only music channel without adverts. By February 2007, the channel started carrying adverts. Adverts usually lasted 60 seconds and appeared after 3 song intervals. The station promised to be no more than 60 seconds away from the next song. Commercial breaks appeared to consist of only two advertisements. This was a unique approach to advertising amongst channels within Europe.

== Bubble Hits (Ireland) ==
A specific Bubble Hits channel for the Irish market (Bubble Hits Ireland) launched on Sky Digital, UPC Ireland, Smart, Magnet Networks, SCTV on Monday 19 May 2008. With specific programming and advertising, the schedule featured more localised content including music videos, music shows, chart shows and entertainment news specific to Ireland & it was also localised by Irish advertisements. bubble hits Ireland closed on the same day as the uk version

== Bubble Hits (Pan-Europe) ==
It was available on satellite, mainly Sky Digital, in the UK. The channel was available free-to-air on Eutelsat 28A in Ireland, Germany, Poland, Hungary and other parts of Europe. The channel was localised with UK advertisements.

Launched on 16 August 2006 this channel served the United Kingdom, Germany, Poland and Hungary. This channel also served Ireland until the launch of Bubble Hits Ireland on 19 May 2008. On 13 February 2009 the channel ceased transmission.

== Former Programmes ==
- Bubble Euro Top 30 – The official European Top 30 chart, videos selected from 11 European countries.
- Poptastic Hits – The latest pop hits
- iBubble – interactive request show
- Bubble Fresh – brand new video show sponsored by Veet
- Pop Pop Pop – non-stop pop video show sponsored by Ryanair.com
- Most Wanted – daily chart show of the highest requested songs of the day sponsored by Jamster
- Glenda's Showbiz Gossip – nightly entertainment news updates every night from 16:00.

=== Former Presenters ===
- Glenda Gilson
- Liam McKenna
- Louis Walsh

== Ownership ==
The station was operated by James Hyland and Lee Walsh.

The pair were listed as 27th richest under-30-year-olds in Ireland in a TV show entitled, "Young, Irish and Wealthy" broadcast on 28 December 2008 on national Irish television station RTÉ One. However, there has been some discussion and debate as to the accuracy of the list.

== Competition ==
- Bubble Hits was the only independent music channel broadcasting into Ireland or the UK without being owned by CSC, MTV Networks Europe or EMAP.
- Bubble Hits was watched by more than MTV in the UK and Ireland. In February 2007 Bubble Hits took 6% of MTV's audience (16- to 34-year-olds) by May 2007 it has risen to 9%. [Source: Irish Examiner (04.08.2007)]
- Bubble Hits claimed to have more than 2.5 million viewers from both Ireland and the UK. [Source: Irish Examiner (04.08.2007)]
