= Gori TV Broadcasting Tower =

- გორის ტელეანძა
- Interactive map of the Gori TV Broadcasting Tower area

General information
- Status: Completed
- Type: Telecommunications
- Location: Gori, Georgia
- Coordinates: 42°01′54″N 44°02′51″E
- Opening: 1972

Height
- Antenna spire: 180 m (590.6 ft)

Gori TV Broadcasting Tower (Georgian: გორის ტელეანძა, goris teleandza) is a free-standing tower structure used for communications purposes. The tower is located in Gori, Georgia and was built in 1972. It is operated by "Telecenter of Georgia", that was established 1955. Communication systems on the tower include regular broadcast, MMDS, pager and cellular, and commercial TV. The tower is 180 m.

== See also ==
- List of towers
- List of masts
- List of skyscrapers
