= Gilbert tessellation =

Mathematical model of crack growth

A Gilbert tessellation

Gilbert tesselation with axis-parallel cracks

In applied mathematics, a Gilbert tessellation or random crack network is a mathematical model for the formation of mudcracks, needle-like crystals, and similar structures. It is named after Edgar Gilbert, who studied this model in 1967.

In Gilbert's model, cracks begin to form at a set of points randomly spread throughout the plane according to a Poisson distribution. Then, each crack spreads in two opposite directions along a line through the initiation point, with the slope of the line chosen uniformly at random. The cracks continue spreading at uniform speed until they reach another crack, at which point they stop, forming a T-junction. The result is a tessellation of the plane by irregular convex polygons.

A variant of the model that has also been studied restricts the orientations of the cracks to be axis-parallel, resulting in a random tessellation of the plane by rectangles.

Gray et al. (1976) write that, in comparison to alternative models in which cracks may cross each other or in which cracks are formed one at a time rather than simultaneously, "most mudcrack patterns in nature topologically resemble" the Gilbert model.
