= Dan Sadot =

Israeli optical communications scientist

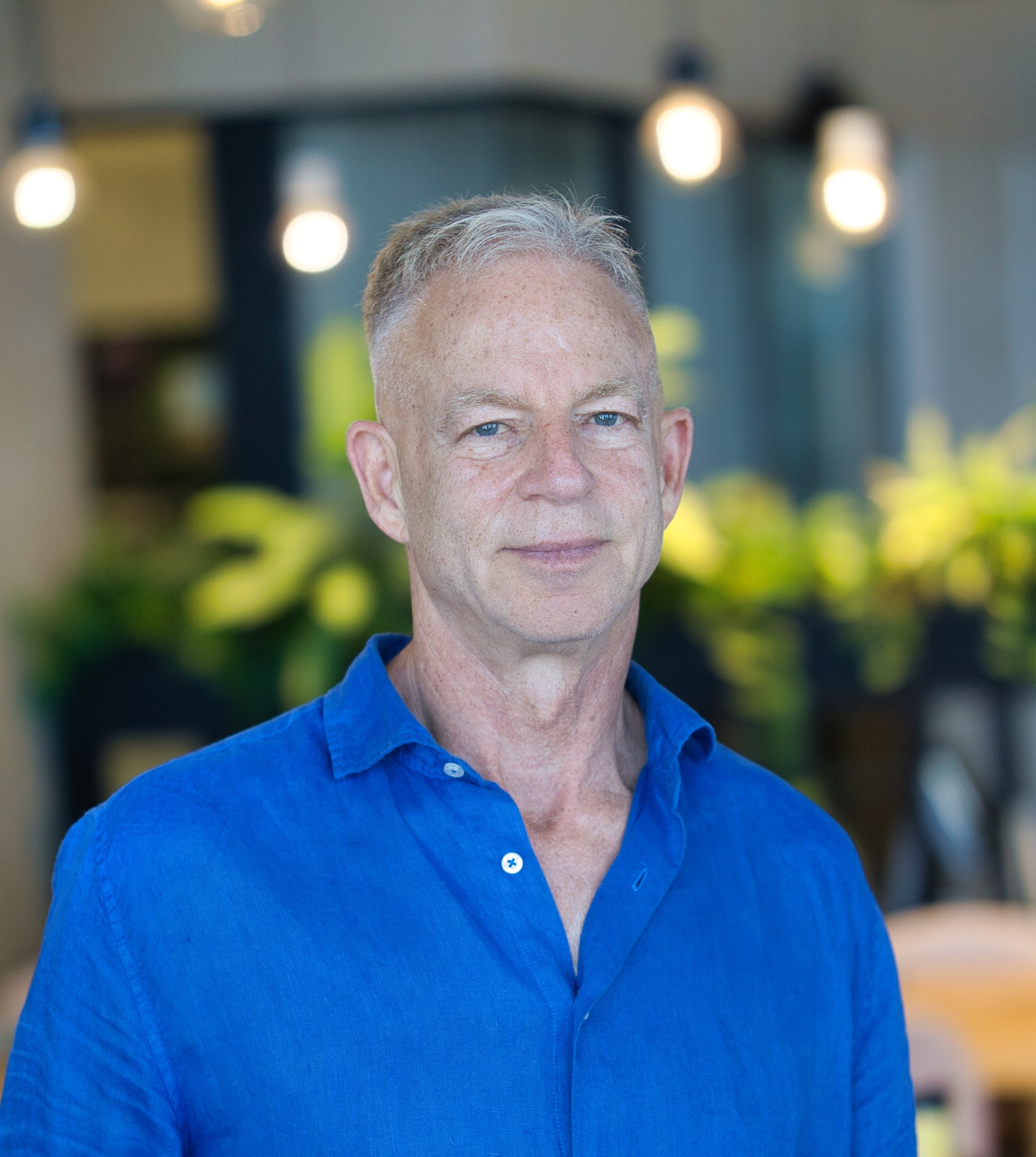
- Education: Ben-Gurion University of the Negev, Stanford University
- Scientific career
- Fields: Optical communications
- Workplaces: Ben-Gurion University of the Negev, CyberRidge, Banias Labs
- Thesis: (1994)
- Doctoral advisor: Natan Kopeika

Dan Sadot (Hebrew: דן שדות (born 1962)) is an Israeli optical communications scientist and entrepreneur.

He is a professor of electrical and computer engineering at Ben-Gurion University of the Negev, where he holds the Reuben and Frances Feinberg Chair in Electro-Optics.

Sadot is also the founder of several start‑ups in the field of optical communications.

== Early life and education ==
Sadot was born in Maracaibo, Venezuela, and immigrated to Israel in 1967. He served in the Israeli Air Force from 1981 to 1984.

He earned B.Sc., M.Sc., and Ph.D. degrees in electrical and computer engineering from Ben‑Gurion University. Sadot won the Clore doctoral scholarship and completed his doctorate summa cum laude in 1994 on electro-optical remote sensing under the supervision of Natan Kopeika.

== Academic career ==
Sadot was a Fulbright and Rothschild postdoctoral fellow in optical communications at Stanford University, supervised by Prof. L. G. Kazovsky. He joined the Electrical and Computer Engineering (ECE) Department at Ben‑Gurion University as a senior lecturer in 1995, becoming an associate professor in 2001 and a full professor in 2009.

Sadot served as the ECE department chair (2007–2013) and vice‑dean of the Faculty of Engineering (2006–2008). In 2001, he was appointed to the Reuben and Frances Feinberg Chair in Electro‑Optics at Ben‑Gurion.

Over the years, Sadot held visiting academic positions at other universities and research institutes, including Bell Labs in New Jersey.

Sadot has supervised 14 Ph.D. students and more than 40 M.Sc. students. He has authored over 230 scientific publications in journals and conferences, and holds 35 patents.

== Research ==
Sadot’s research focuses on optical communication and networking.

His studies include signal processing in optical communications, coherent detection, optical OFDM, atmospheric optics, dynamic WDM networks, and security in optical communication networks.

== Industry and entrepreneurship ==
Sadot has founded several start‑ups, including TeraCross (1999–2002), Xlight Photonics (2000–2003), MultiPhy (2006–2018), and Banias Labs (2020–2022), which was acquired for $240 million by Alphawave.

In 2022, Sadot founded CyberRidge, a company that protects data traveling over fiber‑optic networks by encrypting it at the photonic (light) layer. He also serves as its CEO.

== Selected publications ==
- D. Sadot and N. S. Kopeika, “Imaging through the atmosphere: practical instrumentation-based theory and verification of aerosol modulation transfer function,” Journal of the Optical Society of America A, 10, No. 1, pp. 172-179, January 1993.
- D. Sadot, and L. G. Kazovsky, “Power budget of STARNET II – an optically-amplified direct-detection WDM network with subcarrier control,” IEEE Journal of Lightwave Technology, 15, no. 9, pp. 1629-1635, September 1997
- D. Sadot, P. Szilagyi, and A. Shkiler, “Double security level in optical communication systems using combined modulation formats,” Fiber and Integrated Optics, 18, no. 4, pp. 199-209, 1999
- D. Sadot, and I. Elhanany, “Optical switching speed requirements for Terabit/sec packet over WDM networks,” IEEE/LEOS Photonics Technology letters, 12, no., 4, pp. 440-442, April 2000
- E. Buimovich and D. Sadot, “Physical limitations of tuning time and system considerations in implementing fast tuning of GCSR lasers,” IEEE/OSA Journal of Lightwave Technology, 22, no. 2, pp. 582-588, February 2004
- D. Sadot, G. Dorman, A. Gorshtein, E. Sonkin, and O. Vidal, “Single channel 112Gbit/sec PAM4 at 56Gbaud with digital signal processing for data centers applications,” IEEE/OSA Optical Fiber Communications Conference (OFC), pp. 1-3, March 2015
- D. Sadot, Y. Yoffe, H. Faig, and E. Wohlgemuth, “Digital Pre-Compensation Techniques Enabling Cost-Effective High-Order Modulation Formats Transmission,” IEEE/OSA Journal of Lightwave Technology, 37, no. 2, pp. 582-588, January 2019
- D. Sadot, I. Attia, O. Balasiano, I. Jonas, Y. Yalinevich, G. Alin, E. Keller. H. Shalom, and E. Wohlgemuth, “Physical Layer Security in High-Speed Optical Communications,“ IEEE/OSA Journal of Lightwave Technology, 43, no. 4, pp. 1671-1677, February 2025

== Personal life ==
Sadot lives in Kfar Bilu, Israel, with his wife. They have three grown children and one grandson.
