= Judy Gilroy =

Irish television presenter

Judy Gilroy is an Irish television presenter working for City Channel. She graduated from University College Dublin (UCD) with an honours degree in Business and Legal Studies in 2008 before moving into television. She is a television presenter and producer with City Channel. where she presents and produces a number of programmes in the genre of entertainment.
