= MVDDS =

Type of television and Internet delivery technology

MVDDS (Multichannel Video and Data Distribution Service) is a type of television and Internet delivery technology licensed for use in the United States by the Federal Communications Commission (FCC). This was subsequently tested by The MITRE Corporation for the FCC. A report was filed in the 98-206 Docket before the FCC.

This terrestrial based Wireless transmission method reuses Direct Broadcast Satellite (DBS) frequencies for distribution of multichannel video and data over large distances.

The spectrum is in the 12.2–12.7 GHz range, offering fast downloads but requiring other frequencies for uploads. It is seen as a potential competitor to cable for delivery of triple play or triple-threat services (voice, data, video).

== History ==
The MVDDS service was created as a result of a "Spectrum Grab" by the now defunct Northpoint Technology LLC. While Northpoint was fighting with the DBS companies, MDS America Inc provided the FCC with engineering information to assist the FCC in formulating the first US MVDDS rules. MDS America was granted permission to conduct experimental testing of their service in Clewiston Florida. This testing was completed by LCC International under the direction of Dr. Bahman Badipour (now President and CEO of Analytical Consulting Services Inc.) in July 2001 and submitted to the FCC in October of that year.

== FCC MVDDS auctions ==
MVDDS spectrum was auctioned by the FCC in two separate auctions. The first was FCC auction 53 (1/14/2004 - 1/27/2004) and this auction with 14 qualified bidders lasted 49 rounds over 9 bidding days. 10 bidders won 192 licenses with Gross Bids of $136,936,200 Each allocated license is exclusive in one geographic area.

The second was FCC auction 63 (12/7/2005 - 12/7/2005) and this auction with 3 qualified bidders lasted 3 rounds over 1 bidding day. 32 bidders won the remaining 22 licenses with Gross Bids of $204,000

MVDDS spectrum (214 licenses) is held by 11 companies, but the largest chunks are owned by three, South.com (an affiliate of Dish Network) with 37 areas, DTV Norwich (an affiliate of Cablevision) with 46 areas, and MDS Operations (an affiliate of MDS America) with 80 areas.

In 2012 Dish Network acquired Cablevision's areas making Dish Network the largest owner of MVDDS spectrum in the US.

== US Based MVDDS systems ==
The system listed below operates using MVDDS to cover an entire Metro area.

- Cibola Wireless Albuquerque, New Mexico

This system was built by MDS America, a US-based MVDDS company.

== International MVDDS-like systems ==
Although MVDDS is a US only service, the systems listed below operate on similar frequencies to MVDDS but with differing power levels.

There are presently other countries using MVDDS for television signal delivery, these also being built by MDS America, for example:

- United Arab Emirates
- Ireland

== See also ==
- MMDS
- MVDS
- Digital television in Europe
- Ku-band
