= Sonny Bloch =

American financial talk radio show host

Irwin H. "Sonny" Bloch (March 1, 1937 – March 10, 1998) was an American financial talk radio show host from 1980 to 1995 who defrauded investors of more than $24 million.

== Early life and education ==
Sonny Bloch grew up in Detroit, Michigan. As a young man, he attended the University of Miami but quit in 1958 to pursue music with his group the Coralairs, who played locally and also traveled to play in Cuba.

== Career ==
Sonny Bloch dovetailed his career in music into a fifteen-year career as a financial talk radio host heard on over 170 stations in the U.S including WOR-AM and WMCA-AM in New York City.

The Sonny Bloch Show featured such prominent guests as Chemical Bank's Irwin Kellner and Federal Reserve Chairman Alan Greenspan.

== Fraud schemes ==
Bloch, his son, and associates had allegedly been involved in a variety of investment fraud schemes.

One scheme sold interest in gold bars that were actually painted ordinary metal bars. Many of his investment recommendations caused his listeners to lose millions of dollars because the true financial viability of the schemes were improperly hidden from investors.

Many of the investment scheme's backers paid to appear on the Sonny Bloch Show and conspired with Bloch to hide the fact that many of these involved companies that were already failing.

One scheme solicited paid "memberships" with the proceeds used to pay for the purchase of a group of radio stations in Florida and Connecticut.

Another pivotal scheme for which Bloch was indicted involved the sale of unregistered shares over the radio, which is illegal.

In his later radio career, allegedly illegitimate wireless cable investment schemes were heavily promoted on his radio show.

Bloch was also indicted for tax evasion.

== Flight from prosecution ==
Shortly after the indictments Bloch fled to the Dominican Republic in 1995 where his wife owned property.

== Incarceration and death ==
Bloch was captured and deported back to the United States in 1995. He pleaded guilty to seven counts of tax evasion and perjury. After serving two years in federal custody, Bloch was found to be in the advanced stages of cancer. He was allowed to return home and died in 1998.
