= Tom Gildea =

Irish politician (born 1939)

Teachta Dála
- In office June 1997 – May 2002
- Constituency: Donegal South-West

Donegal County Councillor
- In office June 1999 – June 2004
- Constituency: Glenties

Personal details
- Born: September 1939 (age 86) County Donegal, Ireland
- Party: Independent
- Spouse: Eilish Hegarty
- Children: 1

Thomas Gildea (born September 1939) is an Irish former politician who was elected as an independent Teachta Dála (TD) at the 1997 general election.

A farmer representing Donegal South-West, he won popular local support for his ultimately successful campaign to legalise 'deflectors' which re-transmitted British television channels in rural areas, but which had been shut down in the wake of legal action by cable and MMDS operators. He supported the Fianna Fáil–Progressive Democrats minority coalition government from 1997 to 2002. Gildea himself operated a deflector system in Donegal.

In the 1999 local elections, he was elected as a member of Donegal County Council for Glenties. He did not contest the 2002 general election and retired from politics at the 2004 local elections.

He was later Chairman of the National Community Television Association.

In July 2000, he married Eilish Hegarty. They have one child.

Dáil	Election	Deputy (Party)	Deputy (Party)	Deputy (Party)
17th	1961	Joseph Brennan (FF)	Cormac Breslin (FF)	Patrick O'Donnell (FG)
18th	1965	Joseph Brennan (FF)	Cormac Breslin (FF)	Patrick O'Donnell (FG)
19th	1969	Constituency abolished. See Donegal–Leitrim		

Dáil	Election	Deputy (Party)	Deputy (Party)	Deputy (Party)
22nd	1981	Pat "the Cope" Gallagher (FF)	Clement Coughlan (FF)	James White (FG)
23rd	1982 (Feb)	Pat "the Cope" Gallagher (FF)	Clement Coughlan (FF)	Dinny McGinley (FG)
24th	1982 (Nov)	Pat "the Cope" Gallagher (FF)	Clement Coughlan (FF)	Dinny McGinley (FG)
24th	1983 by-election	Pat "the Cope" Gallagher (FF)	Cathal Coughlan (FF)	Dinny McGinley (FG)
25th	1987	Pat "the Cope" Gallagher (FF)	Mary Coughlan (FF)	Dinny McGinley (FG)
26th	1989	Pat "the Cope" Gallagher (FF)	Mary Coughlan (FF)	Dinny McGinley (FG)
27th	1992	Pat "the Cope" Gallagher (FF)	Mary Coughlan (FF)	Dinny McGinley (FG)
28th	1997	Tom Gildea (Ind.)	Mary Coughlan (FF)	Dinny McGinley (FG)
29th	2002	Pat "the Cope" Gallagher (FF)	Mary Coughlan (FF)	Dinny McGinley (FG)
30th	2007	Pat "the Cope" Gallagher (FF)	Mary Coughlan (FF)	Dinny McGinley (FG)
30th	2010 by-election	Pearse Doherty (SF)	Mary Coughlan (FF)	Dinny McGinley (FG)
31st	2011	Pearse Doherty (SF)	Thomas Pringle (Ind.)	Dinny McGinley (FG)
32nd	2016	Constituency abolished. See Donegal		
