= David Harvey (television) =

Irish executive and broadcaster

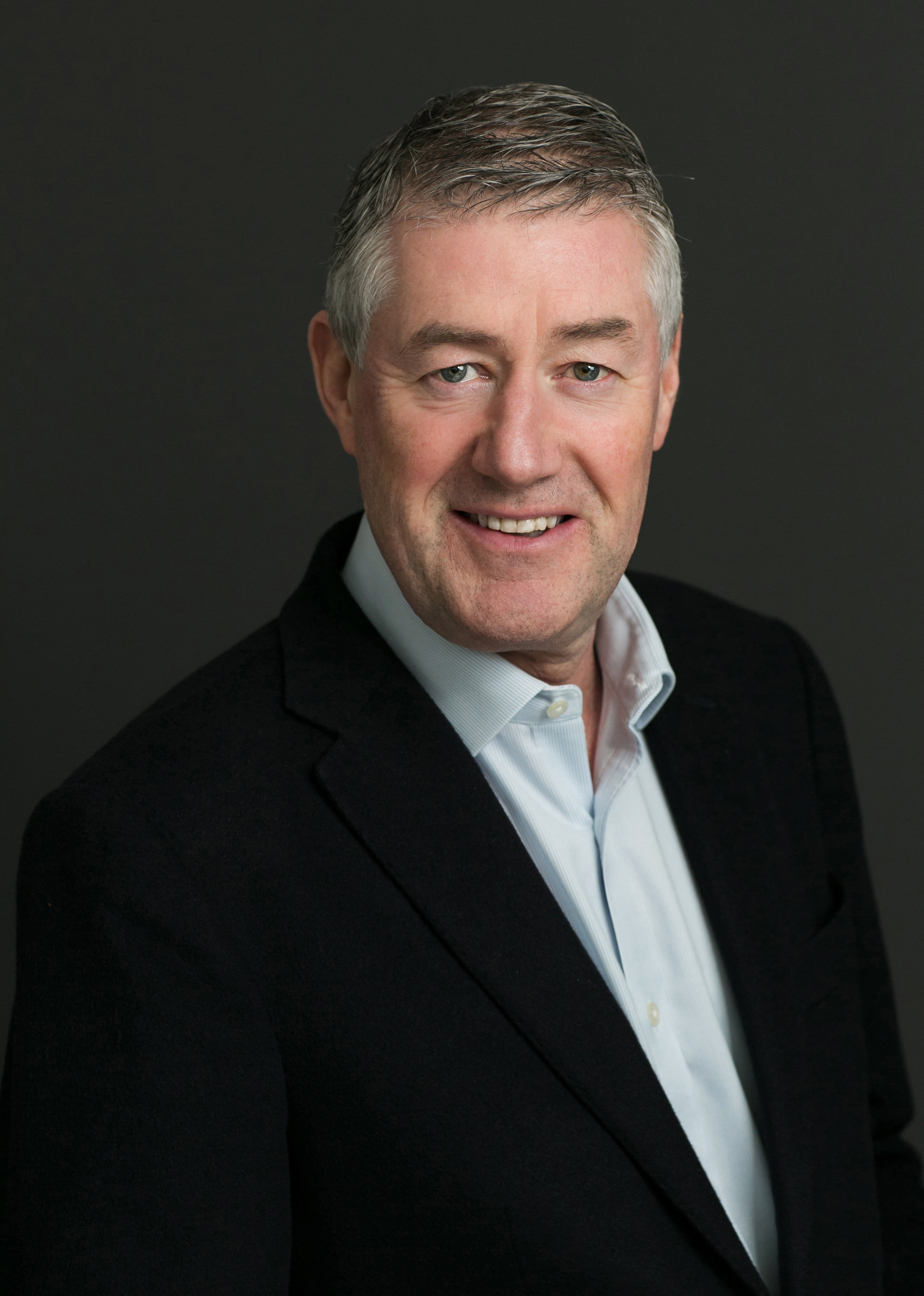
David Harvey

David Harvey is an Irish media executive and broadcaster on radio and television.

== Early life ==
Harvey grew up in Cabinteely, south Dublin. He was educated at Blackrock College and Trinity College Dublin. His father Gerry Harvey ended his career as CEO of An Post and was also the founder and chairman of the National Lottery. His grandfather, Jimmy Harvey, played soccer for Ireland, Shelbourne and Leeds, and was a comedian and member of the theatrical "Happy Gang" of the 1930s and 1940s.

== Career ==
In his native Ireland, he is best known as the presenter of Crimeline on Raidió Teilifís Éireann (RTÉ), Ireland's national broadcaster. He hosted the crime prevention programme with the late Marian Finucane from 1992 to 2003. Earlier in his career, he worked as a producer and presenter with a number of Irish radio stations including Century Radio and Radio Nova. At Century he was a part of a breakfast show team that included Marty Whelan and John Saunders.

Harvey was CEO of the Irish-based City Channel and was a founder of Star Broadcasting, the company that owns Sunshine 106.8. He also hosted the David Harvey Show on 4FM.

In 2013, Sharon Murphy lodged complaints on behalf of the Galway One World Centre with the Broadcasting Authority of Ireland (BAI) regarding racist remarks callers made on the David Harvey Show on 16 January 2013. The BAI ruled in October 2013 that Harvey and the station didn't go far enough to counter the racist remarks. Harvey contested the finding, but the appeal was rejected.

In 2016 Harvey won, along with Bob Geldof, the IFTA award for Best Specialist documentary for A Fanatic Heart: Bob Geldof on WB Yeats.

== Non-profit associations ==
David Harvey served as president of the Blackrock College Union in 2011-12. Harvey also chaired the board of the People in Need Trust, and was chairman of the governing body of the Dún Laoghaire Institute of Art, Design and Technology (IADT) (2005-2010).

He was chairman of the National Library of Ireland (2010-2015) and chairman of the national St Patrick's Festival Board from 2008-2014. During his time as chairman of the National Library, he was involved in negotiating the donation of the Seamus Heaney Archive and the Band Aid Archive to the state.

In November 2015, he was appointed as chairman of the Irish Museum of Modern Art (IMMA) He was reappointed in December 2020.

Harvey has sat on the RTÉ Board since July 2021.
