= John P. Costas (engineer) =

American electrical engineer

- Born: 1923; Wabash, Indiana
- Died: 2008 (aged 84–85)
- Education: Purdue BS 1944, M.E.E. 1947; MIT PhD 1951
- Known for: Costas loops Costas arrays
- Scientific career
- Fields: Electrical Engineering; Radar
- Doctoral advisor: Norbert Wiener

John Peter Costas (1923 in Wabash, Indiana – August 9, 2008) was an American electrical engineer. Costas invented, among other things, the Costas loop and Costas arrays.

== Biography ==
Costas studied at Purdue University as an undergraduate. During World War II, he was involved in radar engineering, serving in the U.S. Navy as a radar officer. He was a graduate student at Massachusetts Institute of Technology (MIT), where he worked on interference filtering and linear systems coding. While there, he worked with Norbert Wiener, R. M. Fano, J. B. Wiesner and Y. W. Lee. He worked for General Electric from 1951 until the early 1980s, and for Cogent Systems, Inc. He was retired since then, and died on August 9, 2008.

== Work ==
Costas is probably best known for his 1950s invention of the Costas loop, a modified phase locked loop that recovers the "suppressed" carrier in many digital communications receivers. It had "a profound effect on modern digital communications" In the 1960s, he helped solve the mystery concerning poor performance of sonar systems. He found that the rapidly time-varying channel made coherent processing inappropriate. His solution involved a kind of permutation array, now known as a Costas array, which has ideal properties for the problem.

Costas was made a fellow of the Institute of Electrical and Electronics Engineers (IEEE) in 1965 for "contributions to communications theory and techniques."

== Publications ==
Among Costas' most notable publications are the following,

- 1984, "A Study of a Class of Detection Waveforms Having Nearly Ideal Range-Doppler Ambiguity Properties" in Proc. IEEE, vol. 72, no. 8, pp.996-1009, Aug. 1984.
- 1975 "Medium constraints on sonar design and performance". Technical Report Class 1 Rep. R65EMH33, GE Co., 1965. a synopsis of this report appeared in the Eascon. Conv. Rec., 1975, pp. 68A—68L
- 1966 "Project Medior – A medium-oriented approach to sonar signal processing". Lockheed Martin Marine Systems and Sensors, 1966.
- 1956 "Synchronous Communications". In Proceedings of the IEEE, December 1956. Republished in same journal in Vol 90, no. 8, August 2002 as classic paper.
