= Chorus Communication Limited =

Irish communications provider

- Type: Private
- Industry: Communications
- Founded: 2000
- Defunct: 4 May 2010
- Headquarters: Limerick City
- Area served: Republic of Ireland
- Products: Cable television, communications
- Parent: UPC Communications Ireland Ltd.
- Website: chorus.ie

Chorus, officially Chorus Communication Limited, was a communications provider in Ireland offering internet, television and telephone services. It was owned by Liberty Global Europe and ultimately controlled by John C. Malone's Liberty Media.

Based in Limerick (and also with offices in Cork), it owned the cable television licenses for the cities of Cork and Limerick as well as for most towns where cable networks existed. A small number of towns (notably Dungarvan) had locally run cable networks. It also held the MMDS licences for many towns across Ireland. The cable networks in the cities of Dublin, Galway and Waterford and the MMDS services for towns in those counties as well Mayo were operated by NTL Ireland.

In 2005 NTL sold its Irish operation to Liberty Global. As a result, cable and MMDS services across the country were temporarily branded "Chorus NTL" before ultimately rebranding to "UPC Ireland" (now Virgin Media Ireland) in 2010, bringing them into line with Liberty Global's TV offerings elsewhere in Europe.

== History ==
The company was formed in 2000 following the buyout of CMI (Cable Management Ireland) by Irish Multichannel (an offshoot of Princes Holdings Limited). Irish Multichannel, a joint venture between Independent News and Media and TCI (later Liberty Media) had been the result of a series of mergers between several regional companies, most notably East Coast Multichannel, Horizon Multichannel, Cork Communications and Westward Cable. Irish Multichannel held the MMDS licences for most of Ireland apart from counties Dublin, Galway and Waterford which were held by Cablelink (later NTL Ireland). It also had an extensive cable network in Cork and Limerick. CMI was owned by a number of Irish businessmen. Its network was pure CATV, having been assembled from a number of private providers. it was thus expected that the newly formed Chorus would have to perform some extreme network consolidation. It went on to purchase Suir-Nore Relays shortly after the merger.

In 2002 the company reported losses of €36.6 million, with their total debt being reported as €385 million in 2004. In late 2004 Independent News and Media sold its shares in Chorus to Liberty Media International which in turn transferred its shareholding in the company to its affiliate, UGC Europe (now Liberty Global Europe). On 12 December 2005, NTL Ireland was acquired by Liberty Global Europe for €325 million and was merged with Liberty Global's Chorus operation. The businesses were quickly merged as a single business under the Chorus NTL brand name, which then changed to Liberty Global's UPC brand.

== Services ==
The fractured nature of the network led to consumers in different areas getting different channel packages and consequently extreme problems for the customer services team who often had no idea what channel package a customer had least beyond core channels. Chorus' customer service was the subject of much criticism. In November 2004, it was reported that Chorus scored the worst in the first ever Irish Customer Respect Index (CRI) which measures how well telecommunication companies are treating their customers online by looking at factors such as privacy, transparency, ease of use and responsiveness. Of the 65 Irish companies surveyed Eircom came out on top with a score of 7.4 whilst Chorus had the lowest score worldwide 2.6 out of 10. Chorus lost significant market share to Sky who launched their digital satellite service in Ireland in the early 2000s.

Following the formation of the unified company, over €130M was spent on network infrastructure, including fibre and microwave links between regions. This meant customers who were using CATV in the Community Antenna sense now generally got a significantly higher quality signal, although poor transmission networks and high compression on microwave links caused MPEG-esque motion problems, even on analogue links.

Chorus provided a bewildering array of services including analogue MMDS, digital MMDS, analogue cable, digital cable, broadband as well as dialup internet and both landline and wireless (not to be confused with mobile) telephone lines. Some areas which could receive MMDS from Irish Multichannel also had cable inherited from CMI, resulting in a choice of services, often one analogue and the other digital. Figures from December 2004 show that the company had a reach of 319,000 homes of which 211,000 had cable or MMDS, 600 had broadband and 500 had telephone services. The future looked bleak for their MMDS operations after BBC and ITV services went free to air on satellite. These channels were often seen as the main reason for keeping the analogue service and were a key feature in Chorus marketing.

The Chorus Digital package was launched on 2 October 2000. It offered a standard line-up in all areas, although it was geared towards MMDS rather than cable and thus offered a smaller line-up than the larger capacity of cable would allow. Alongside the traditional terrestrial stations, channels from the BBC, ITV, Channel 4, BSkyB, Flextech, and others are carried. The Irish national channels were offered via MMDS on digital for the first time. On analogue MMDS only TV3 was required to be carried because analogue MMDS in Ireland offered a maximum of 12 channels.

From 2000 to 2007, Chorus offered a sports channel which specialised in Gaelic Athletic Association coverage. Outside of Cork, the company carried the basic channel pack on all analogue cable links unencrypted to save on decoder equipment. Premium channels including Sky Sports and Sky Movies were always available, with more movies as well as the Fantasy Channel in some areas.

In May 2005 the Broadcasting Commission of Ireland announced that it was issuing Chorus with a ten-year broadcasting contract for a channel to replace the sports channel to carry documentaries, arts programming and an expanded selection of sports coverage, including motor sports. Had this channel launched when initially licensed, it would have been the first Irish broad format channel specifically for closed-access systems. It was beaten to this milestone by the short-lived City Channel. The licensing documents referred to it as "Chorus TV".

=== Limerick City ===
Analogue and digital MMDS services were available in Limerick from a transmitter on Woodcock Hill. The city's cable TV system descends from Westward Cable (later Irish Multichannel) and installation of the network began in the early 1980s. This covered most of the city as far as Castletroy on the south side and Caherdavin to the north. Unfortunately it never reached some areas of the city (e.g. Clare Street) and most housing developments built since the 90s have not been linked to the network. As of 2006 only analogue CATV was available on the system, with 18 unencrypted channels (including Channel 6 and Chorus TV) and some encrypted channels (such as Sky Sports 1 and Sky Movies 1). Customers were supplied with cumbersome old Jerrold/General Instrument decoders to avail of the encrypted channels. Signal quality varied greatly and was often quite poor due to the age of the cables and related equipment. MPEG compression artefacts were also noticeably high on some channels sourced from digital MMDS signals. Interruption of service was also quite frequent. Channels previously on VHF Band I frequencies were moved to Band III positions to make way for the introduction of the cable broadband service. Digital cable television and broadband services were slowly introduced across the city from late 2006.

== Late 2000s ==
In May 2005, Morgan Stanley bought the Irish assets of NTL, on behalf of Chorus' owners UGC Europe (now Liberty Global Europe), with the intention of selling them on to Liberty once a Competition Authority investigation had been completed.

NTL Ireland included a certain amount of fibre backbone, and a cable network (digital is available throughout most of the network, but the vast majority of customers still take just analogue) that covers the areas of Dublin, Galway, and Waterford for which Chorus are not licensed. NTL also offer broadband to a higher number of subscribers, and did offer a telephone service, which was removed after it was revealed that the handsets they used could catch fire. NTL also own the remaining MMDS licences (for cells covering counties Dublin, Galway, Mayo, and Waterford).

On 12 December 2005, Liberty Global Europe completed its acquisition of NTL Ireland, which became part of the UPC Broadband group within Liberty.

It is assumed that Liberty will merge NTL and Chorus, under their UPC (for television) and Chello (for internet) brands, and continue to consolidate their network. The company formed to acquire the network from Morgan Stanley is "UPC Ireland N.V.", fuelling speculation this will be the eventual name. A combined company would own all the MMDS licences and almost all the cable licences in the Republic of Ireland (the local networks in Dungarvan, County Waterford and Longford town being the only major exception). They have announced that $200 million is to be spent replacing all coaxial trunk with fibre and upgrading all cable into homes with cable capable of carrying signals up to 850 MHz. This is claimed to be able to carry multi-channel cable and 30 Mbit/s internet concurrently.

From December 2006, Chorus began running NTL Ireland's customer service from Limerick, in line with UPC's merger of the two companies. On 22 March 2007, Chorus changed its digital cable line up to a subset of NTL Ireland's line up, using the same EPG numbering system as NTL. The MMDS lineup is still unchanged.

Chorus was renamed as UPC Ireland in 2010, along with its sister company NTL Ireland. In preparation for this, from July 2007 advertising for both companies began using a composite logo reading "Chorus NTL – A UPC Company".

== See also ==
- List of companies of Ireland
