= MDS America =

Telecommunications company

MDS America, Inc.
- Type: Corporation
- Industry: Telecommunication Manufacturing
- Founded: 2001
- Headquarters: Stuart, Florida, USA
- Key people: Kirk Kirkpatrick
- Products: Direct broadcast television, Internet
- Number of employees: 20
- Parent: MDSA Holding
- Subsidiaries: MDS Operations
- Website: http://www.mdsamerica.com

MDS America, Inc (MDSA) is a wireless Internet and wireless cable TV technology provider based in Stuart, Florida, US. MDS America was the primary party responsible for the invalidation of Northpoint Technology Inc's patents having to do with extraterrestrial rebroadcast of satellite signals.

MDS Operations, an affiliated company, participated in recent auctions in 2005 and 2006 held by the Federal Communications Commission (FCC) of the frequency band of 12.2 - 12.7 GHz, which it christened "MVDDS".

== Technology ==
The receiver of MDSA's system uses a technology that is patented under US patent number 7,286,795.

The MVDDS system uses similar spectrum to a direct broadcast satellite (DBS) system, and is capable of operating at the same frequencies without interference. The MDSA two-way system competes against satellite Internet access; the shorter round trip distance of only a few hundred kilometers reduces the latency compared with a geostationary satellite's 44,000 mile 250ms latency. The MDSA system has the disadvantage of requiring infrastructure closer to the user - a satellite can cover a significant proportion of the country, instead of the maximum 200 km radius of an MDSA base station. However, since the MDSA signal can be sectorized, MDSA's bandwidth, unlike that of satellite, can be multiplied in most geographical areas. For video distribution, this means that local channels and local advertising can be injected into the signal, unlike with DBS satellite systems.

MDS America Inc. (MDSA) built the first Terrestrial Digital Television distribution system in Ireland. As well MDS America has built the largest MVDDS systems in the world, including the 700 channel capacity system in the United Arab Emirates. In 2011 MDS America built the first commercial wide-area MVDDS system in the United States, in Albuquerque New Mexico.This system can provide up to 50 Mbit/s service to homes and businesses in the Albuquerque area. This is the first ever business/residential service delivering 50 Mbit/s by Wireless to an entire metropolitan area.

== US Based MVDDS systems ==
MDS America has built and operates an MVDDS system in Albuquerque New Mexico. The system operates using MVDDS to cover an entire Metro area providing 50 Mbit/s of wireless Internet to the home.

- Cibola Wireless Albuquerque, Maine

== Legal history ==
=== Northpoint Technology Ltd ===
MDSA was sued by Northpoint Technology Ltd., on the grounds of patent infringement (US Patents #5,761,605 and #6,169,878.) MDSA contended that the patents that Northpoint had been granted were invalid since the patents essentially covered attributes of a satellite dish and Northpoint had not invented satellite dishes. In 2004, a jury in Federal Court in Ft. Pierce, Florida invalidated both asserted Northpoint patents on four separate grounds. This court case and subsequent invalidation of Northpoint's patents opened the way for the auctioning of MVDDS spectrum.

=== Northpoint Appeal ===
The above case was appealed to the United States Court of Appeals for the Federal Circuit. On June 28, 2005, the court AFFIRMED the findings of the lower court permanently invalidating both patents.

=== MDS international ===
Shortly after this MDSA's subsidiary company MDS International are found to be in contempt of court for violation of a settlement agreement. Although the agreement is sealed, the Contempt of court order is not and is publicly available. This Contempt order reveals that:

1. MDS international is required to state clearly on its website that it does not serve the United States."

2. "the Settlement Agreement that makes MDSA the sole owner of the rights to the HyCanC technology."

== Management ==
- Kirk Kirkpatrick: Founder, President, and CEO
- Allen Quinn: Exec. Vice President and COO
- Grigory Kholodkov: Chief Engineer MDSA
- Fabrice Ducasse: Vice President, Sales and Marketing
- Gopiballava Flaherty: CIO
