= Magnet Networks =

Irish telecommunications company

Magnet Networks, trading as Magnet Plus, is an Irish company providing telephone and broadband internet services which was launched in Dublin in 2004. Originally owned by the US-based international investment company Columbia Ventures Corporation (CVC), it was acquired in December 2020 by the "Irish investment vehicle" Speed Fibre Group. Speed Fibre Group, itself a subsidiary of the Irish Infrastructure Fund, also owned AirSpeed Telecom and, in 2021, these two companies joined to operate under a combined "Magnet Plus" brand. As of 2020, Magnet Networks reportedly had approximately 100 staff.

== Organisation ==
Magnet Entertainment, the home services division of Magnet Networks, provides digital telephony, digital television, video on demand, and broadband internet products.

Magnet Business provides DSL internet access and VoIP telephony to business customers. As of 2016, Magnet Business was reportedly the "third-largest business telecoms provider" in Ireland.

As of February 2020, Magnet's "interim managing director" was Dave Brewer (of then parent organisation CVC).

Magnet Network's competitors in Ireland include Virgin Media Ireland, Sky Ireland and eir.
