= NTL Ireland =

NTL Communications (Ireland) Limited (Defunct)
- Formerly: RTÉ Relays Limited (1970–1986); Cablelink Limited (1986–2000)
- Company type: Private limited company by shares
- Industry: Communications
- Founded: 1970
- Defunct: 4 May 2010
- Headquarters: Dublin, Ireland
- Area served: Ireland
- Products: Cable television, communications
- Parent: UPC Communications Ireland Ltd.
- Website: upc.ie

NTL Communications (Ireland) Limited was a cable television and Multichannel Multipoint Distribution Service (MMDS) company in Ireland. As of 2005 it was owned by Liberty Global Europe (see history, below), having been divested by NTL. It was rebranded as UPC Ireland (now called Virgin Media Ireland).

== Services ==
The company held cable television licences for Dublin, Galway, and Waterford cities (with the Dublin licences also covering Leixlip, County Kildare, Dunboyne, County Meath, and Bray, County Wicklow). It also held MMDS franchises for cells covering the above counties, as well as County Mayo. It provided an analogue cable television service (with a very high take up in its areas passed), which provided the Irish terrestrial channels, plus BBC One, BBC Two, UTV, Channel 4, Sky1, Sky News and a small number of other channels. It also provided a digital television service, with over a third of its customer base taking a digital service. The company also converted its entire MMDS network to digital, with an offering of approximately seventy TV and radio services, while MMDS was switched off.

In its final years, the company rolled out broadband and enabled one third of its Dublin and 100% of its network in Galway and Waterford for broadband, becoming a major broadband provider in Ireland.

== History ==
=== RTÉ / Telecom Éireann ownership ===
The company began operations in 1970 as RTÉ Relays, a subsidiary of Raidió Teilifís Éireann. It carried four channels – RTÉ Television, BBC1, BBC2, and Ulster Television. In 1984, the company merged with Dublin Cable Systems, itself the product of a merger of Marlin Cable with Phoenix Relays. In 1986, the Irish Government began to allow Irish cable companies to carry non-terrestrial (i.e. satellite) services. In the same year, RTÉ merged all of its cable operations (including two other cable companies, Galway Cablevision and Waterford Cablevision) to form Cablelink Limited. As Cablelink, the company was Ireland's largest cable company by far, and expanded to a fifteen channel service (plus premium channels) gradually. In 1990, Telecom Éireann acquired 60% of the company from RTÉ. The biggest controversy the company managed to embroil itself during this time was a dispute with British Sky Broadcasting over carriage fees for Sky One and Sky News. This led to the two channels being pulled from the platform from 1992 to 1994. The "return of Bart Simpson" was prematurely announced by Cablelink several times before the channels actually reappeared.

The company also wished to develop broadband services in 1997/1998 but there was an embargo on developing and selling Internet services by the main shareholders, Telecom Éireann, but the management felt if it were developed and a trial launched then there would be no stopping this. To conceal this from the Board, they hired a small Dublin company The Communications Interactive Agency to manage and run the trial. To this end all purchases of equipment and Internet Services were done in their name. At the time they were one of the first to demonstrate VoIP in Ireland as a commercial service which was done by the then managing director Alex Gogan at the Press Launch, by dialling live the Speaking Clock in New York using Net2phone.com service.

At the time they were one of the first companies in Europe to trial and launch Broadband services. What stopped the trial from becoming a full roll out across their network was the purchase by NTL. It took the company almost four more years to integrate NTL Broadband service.

=== Sale to NTL ===
In 1999, as part of the privatisation of Eircom, the Government put pressure on the shareholders of Cablelink to sell the company. Part of the reason was that Eircom was regarded by some as a "spoiler shareholder" in Cablelink, refusing to allow the company to compete in the voice telephony market that it dominated. The company was put up for auction, with bidders including Esat Telecom Group, NTL, and UPC, as well as CMI Cable and Irish Multichannel. It was eventually announced that NTL would acquire the company for IR£535.18m (nearly €680 million).

Under NTL, the company was renamed NTL Ireland on 3 July 2000, and began offering telephony and internet services. The company began to upgrade its network and in 2001 launched its digital television service. However the company lost two managing directors during the time NTL ran the franchise. The biggest crisis erupted in early 2001, when NTL stopped selling its direct telephony and high-speed internet services, and halted the roll out of its upgraded hybrid fibre coax network. This led to a very public row with the Commission for Communications Regulation, and the resignation of Ian Jeffers, the NTL executive who had been assigned to the Dublin operation upon the NTL takeover. Some years later, the company was forced to suspend its telephone service after problems with the equipment emerged.

=== Sale to Liberty Global ===
Logo of the Chorus NTL.

Despite NTL Ireland turning a profit as a result of its expected merger with Telewest, the Irish assets were then considered non-core. In May 2005, NTL sold its Irish business to Morgan Stanley (on behalf of Liberty Global Europe (then called UGC Europe)). MS Irish Cable Holdings, a subsidiary of Morgan Stanley, held the stake on UGC's behalf, until the deal received regulatory clearance.

However a Competition Authority investigation into the proposed resale of the company to Liberty Global Europe took place. On 4 November 2005 it was announced the Competition Authority had cleared the deal, subject to the appointment of an independent director to the board of UPC Ireland and restrictions on the influence of John C. Malone on the running of the Irish business.

The deal was approved by the Minister for Enterprise, Trade and Employment, Micheál Martin on 5 December 2005, and closed on 12 December 2005. At the time, Liberty used the "Chorus NTL" brand (under licence) in Ireland. Most aspects of the company were merged with Chorus (billing, website etc.).

After a period branded as "Chorus NTL", the company carried out an extensive upgrade of the cable television networks it acquired, then re-launched as UPC Ireland.

In early 2006 the two companies were placed under a single management team. On 3 July 2006 it was reported on RTÉ News that as part of the merger, up to 350 jobs would be lost, including the closure of NTL's call centre in Waterford. In December 2006 NTL's customer service department closed, and customer service was transferred to the former Chorus call centre in Limerick. In January 2007, billing was transferred to a new system.

== Rebranding ==
On 25 January 2007, NTL Ireland updated the electronic programme guide software to remove the NTL logo and all mention of the NTL name. However the UPC name did not replace it, the areas which contained the NTL logo simply being left blank. The colour scheme was still NTL's. From 31 January 2007, NTL and Chorus began advertising jointly, although the adverts were simply the ongoing campaign from NTL with the Chorus logo added to them.

In a Sunday Business Post article on 11 February 2007, UPC Ireland's marketing manager revealed that the rebrand was due to take place no later than May 2007. That did not happen, although, from July 2007, a composite "Chorus NTL" logo has been used in all advertising, with the tagline "A UPC Company" below. It was then expected that the full rebrand would take place in early 2008. In late September and early October NTL included a leaflet with its bills stating a new logo would appear on bills from 21 October. Although many took that to read that the relaunch would happen on that day, this did not occur.

On 14 August 2007 NTL launched a personal video recorder, the UPC Mediabox. Chorus then launched the same device in its cable areas in Autumn 2007. This was followed, on 30 October 2007, NTL and Chorus' websites were merged under a single site, though the composite Chorus NTL logo was used on the site rather than the UPC logo.

Most users of the EPG were switched fully to the new UPC EPG, taking the NTL EPG off air.

The company was rebranded on 4 May 2010.
