= Multichannel multipoint distribution service =

Wireless communications technology

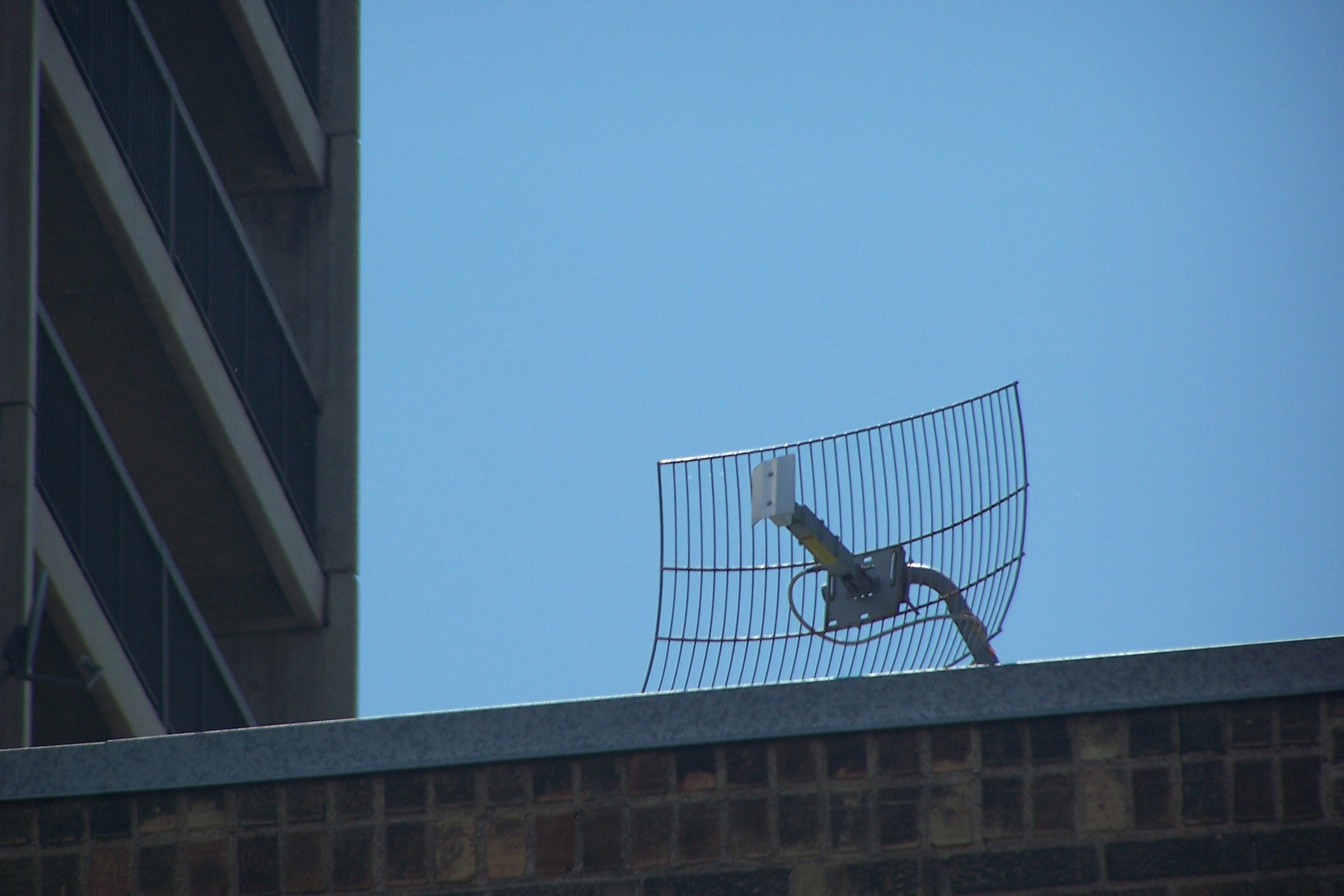
MMDS microwave dish

Multichannel multipoint distribution service (MMDS), formerly known as broadband radio service (BRS) and also known as wireless cable, is a wireless telecommunications technology, used for general-purpose broadband networking or, more commonly, as an alternative method of cable television programming reception.

MMDS is used in Australia, Barbados, Belarus, Bolivia, Brazil, Cambodia, Canada, Czech Republic, Dominican Republic, Hungary, India, Iraq (Asiacell only), Kazakhstan, Kyrgyzstan, Lebanon, Mexico, Nepal, Nigeria, Pakistan, Panama, Portugal (including Madeira), Russia, Slovakia, Sri Lanka, Sudan, Thailand, Ukraine, United States, Uruguay and Vietnam. It is most commonly used in sparsely populated rural areas, where laying cables is not economically viable, although some companies have also offered MMDS services in urban areas, most notably in Ireland, until they were phased out in 2016.

== Technology ==
The BRS band uses microwave frequencies from 2.3 to 2.5 GHz. Reception of BRS-delivered television and data signals is done with a rooftop microwave antenna. The antenna is attached to a down-converter or transceiver to receive and transmit the microwave signal and convert them to frequencies compatible with standard TV tuners (much like on satellite dishes where the signals are converted down to frequencies more compatible with standard TV coaxial cabling), some antennas use an integrated down-converter or transceiver. Digital TV channels can then be decoded with a standard cable set-top box or directly for TVs with integrated digital tuners. Internet data can be received with a standard DOCSIS cable modem connected to the same antenna and transceiver.

The MMDS band is separated into 33 (31 in USA) 6 MHz "channels", which may be licensed to cable companies offering service in different areas of a country. The concept was to allow entities to own several channels and multiplex several television, radio, and later Internet data onto each channel using digital technology. Just like with digital cable channels, each channel is capable of 30.34 Mbit/s with 64QAM modulation, and 42.88 Mbit/s with 256QAM modulation. Due to forward error correction and other overhead, actual throughput is around 27 Mbit/s for 64QAM and 38 Mbit/s for 256QAM.

The newer BRS Band Plan makes changes to channel size and licensing in order to accommodate new WIMAX TDD fixed and mobile equipment, and reallocated frequencies between 2150 and 2162 MHz to the AWS band. These changes may not be compatible with the frequencies and channel sizes required for operating traditional MMDS or DOCSIS based equipment. MMDS has been used to provide internet access.

== MMDS and DOCSIS+ ==
Local multipoint distribution service (LMDS) and BRS have adapted the DOCSIS (Data Over Cable Service Interface Specification) from the cable modem world. The version of DOCSIS modified for wireless broadband is known as DOCSIS+.

Data-transport security is accomplished under BRS by encrypting traffic flows between the broadband wireless modem and the WMTS (wireless modem termination system) located in the base station of the provider's network using Triple DES.

DOCSIS+ reduces theft-of-service vulnerabilities under BRS by requiring that the WMTS enforce encryption, and by employing an authenticated client/server key-management protocol in which the WMTS controls distribution of keying material to broadband wireless modems.

LMDS and BRS wireless modems utilize the DOCSIS+ key-management protocol to obtain authorization and traffic encryption material from a WMTS, and to support periodic reauthorization and key refresh. The key-management protocol uses X.509 digital certificates, RSA public-key encryption, and Triple DES encryption to secure key exchanges between the wireless modem and the WMTS.

MMDS provided significantly greater range than LMDS.

MMDS may be obsoleted by the newer 802.16 WiMAX standard approved since 2004.

MMDS was sometimes expanded to multipoint microwave distribution system or multi-channel multi-point distribution system. All three phrases refer to the same technology.

== Current status ==
In the United States, WATCH Communications (based in Lima, Ohio), Eagle Vision (based in Kirksville, MO), and several other companies offer MMDS-based wireless cable television, Internet access, and IP-based telephone services.

In certain areas, BRS is being deployed for use as wireless high-speed Internet access, mostly in rural areas where other types of high-speed internet are either unavailable (such as cable or DSL) or prohibitively expensive (such as satellite internet). CommSPEED is a major vendor in the US market for BRS-based internet.

AWI Networks (formerly Sky-View Technologies) operates a number of MMDS sites delivering high-speed Internet, VoIP telephone, and digital TV services in the Southwestern U.S. In 2010, AWI began upgrading its infrastructure to DOCSIS 3.0 hardware, along with new microwave transmission equipment, allowing higher modulation rates like 256QAM. This has enabled download speeds in excess of 100 Mbit/s, over distances up to 35 miles (56 km) from the transmission site.

In the early days of MMDS, it was known as "wireless cable" and was used in a variety of investment scams that still surface today. Frequent solicitations of wireless cable fraud schemes were often heard on talk radio shows like The Sonny Bloch Show in the mid-1990s.

Several US telephone companies attempted television services via this system in the mid-1990s – the Tele-TV venture of Bell Atlantic, NYNEX and Pacific Bell; and the rival Americast consortium of Ameritech, BellSouth, SBC, SNET and GTE. The Tele-TV operation was only launched from 1999 to 2001 by Pacific Bell (the merged Bell Atlantic/NYNEX never launched a service), while Americast also petered out by that time, albeit mainly in GTE and BellSouth areas; the systems operated by Ameritech utilized standard wired cable.

In the Canadian provinces of Manitoba and British Columbia, Craig Wireless operates a wireless cable and internet service (MMDS) for rural and remote customers. In Saskatchewan, Sasktel operated an MMDS system under the name Wireless Broadband Internet (WBBI) for rural internet access until it was shut down in 2014 and replaced with an LTE-TDD system due to reallocation of the radio spectrum by Industry Canada.

In Mexico, the 2.5 GHz band spectrum was reclaimed by the government in order to allow newer and better wireless data services. Hence, MAS TV (formerly known as MVS Multivision) had to relinquish the concessions for TV broadcast and shut down its MMDS pay TV services in 2014 after 25 years of service. The same occurred in Panama in 2024.

In Ireland, since 1990, UPC Ireland (previously Chorus and NTL Ireland) offered MMDS TV services almost nationwide. The frequency band initially allocated was 2500–2690 MHz (the "2.6 GHz band") consisting of 22–23 analogue 8 MHz channels; digital TV was restricted to 2524–2668 MHz, consisting of 18 digital 8 MHz channels. Two digital TV standards were used: DVB-T/MPEG-2 in the old Chorus franchise area and DVB-C/MPEG-2 in the old NTL franchise area. The existing licences were to expire 18 April 2014, but Comreg, the Irish communications regulator, extended the licences for a further 2 years to 18 April 2016, at which date they expired together with all associated spectrum rights of use. The 2.6 GHz band spectrum will be auctioned off so that when the existing MMDS licences expire, new rights of use can issue on a service- and technology-neutral basis (by means of new licences). As a result, holders of the new rights of use may choose to provide any service capable of being delivered using 2.6 GHz spectrum. For instance, they could distribute television programming content, subject to complying with the relevant technical conditions and with any necessary broadcasting content authorisations, or they could adopt some other use.

In Iceland, since November 2006, Vodafone Iceland runs Digital Ísland (Digital Iceland) – the broadcasting system for 365 (previously operated by 365 Broadcast Media). Digital Ísland offers digital MMDS television services using DVB-T technology alongside a few analogue channels. The MMDS frequency range extends from 2500 to 2684 MHz for a total of 23 (21 of which are considered usable for broadcasting in Iceland) 8 MHz channels. Analogue MMDS broadcasting began in 1993, moving to digital in 2004.

In Brazil, the shutdown of the MMDS technology started in 2012 to release the frequency for the 2500–2600 MHz LTE-UTRAN band, which would make the service infeasible. The national shutdown was planned to be finished at the end of 2012; as of 2013, the service had already been shut down in most cities.

In the Dominican Republic, Wind Telecom started operations using MMDS technology in 2008; at that time and ever since it became a pioneer taking advantage of such implementations. The company uses the DVB standard for its digital television transmissions.

== See also ==
- Federal Communications Commission (FCC)
- Hybrid fiber-coaxial
