= 2013 in Irish television =

The following is a list of events relating to television in Ireland from 2013.

== Events ==
=== January ===
- 6 January – It is reported that Seán Gallagher, a former candidate in the 2011 Irish presidential election is launching legal proceedings against RTÉ over an incident in its Frontline Presidential Debate in which a tweet was wrongly attributed to the official Twitter account of the Sinn Féin's Martin McGuinness.
- 7 January – Debut of TV3's first self-produced drama, Deception, set on a post-Celtic Tiger housing estate in Galway.
- 30 January – Former Channel 5 Director of Programmes Jeff Ford has been hired by TV3 to become their new Director of Content, a position he will take up in February.
- 31 January – Figures published by TAM Ireland/Nielsen indicate viewers in Ireland watched an average of 3.35 hours of television per day (25 hours a week) in 2012.

=== February ===
- 1 February – Pat Kenny, most recently presenter of The Frontline, returns to host an edition of The Late Late Show after the death earlier in the week of regular host Ryan Tubridy's father.
- 5 February – Launch of Irish Horse TV, Ireland's first TV channel dedicated to horse racing and other equine sports.
- 7 February – The Irish Film and Television Network website reports that pre-production has begun on An Bronntanas, a five-part Irish language thriller set in Conamara that will air on TG4 in 2014.
- 25 February – Telecommunications giant BT, which bought the rights to some Premier League matches in 2012 expands its investment in sports broadcasting with the purchase of ESPN's channels in Britain and Ireland.

=== March ===
- 4 March – Online retailer Viking Direct says it cannot fulfil orders placed for a 51-inch 3D television that was incorrectly priced at €6.49 instead of €649. Thousands of orders were placed during the two days the offer was available, but customers will not receive their purchase, nor will they get an automatic refund.
- 7 March – Minister for Communications, Energy and Natural Resources Pat Rabbitte officially opens TV3's new €5m Sony HD production centre at Ballymount.
- 14 March – The Lowry Tapes, containing a telephone conversation between corrupt politician Michael Lowry and land agent Kevin Phelan, are broadcast in full on Tonight with Vincent Browne.

=== April ===
- 11 April – TV3 criticises new regulations that ban radio and television journalists from expressing an on-air opinion on news and current affairs issues as "a draconian extension of the State's control over media".
- 28 April – Keith Hanley wins the second series of The Voice of Ireland.

=== May ===
- 21 May – Justice Minister Alan Shatter apologises to independent deputy Mick Wallace in the Dáil Éireann after he divulged that Wallace had been excused from receiving penalty points for using a mobile phone while driving during a debate about people escaping penalty points on an edition of RTÉ's Prime Time. Shatter had previously admitted receiving his information from Garda Commissioner Martin Callinan but claimed he was not "in the business of collecting secret files on politicians".
- 30 May – Three international deals are announced by Dublin-based Network Ireland Television that will see 50 Irish-made short films aired on television channels in the Americas, Europe and Middle East.

=== June ===
- 3 June – AerTV, an Irish-owned online television service launched 18 months previously reports a 130% year-on-year increase in viewership for the first quarter of 2013.
- 5 June – Food manufacturers criticise Broadcasting Authority of Ireland plans to introduce new regulations banning television and radio advertising of foods with high fat, salt, and sugar content during children's programmes.
- 25 June – Setanta Sports signs a deal to make their BT Sport channels and ESPN available in the Irish Republic from 1 August.

=== July ===
- 11 July – Fine Gael Teachta Dála Tom Barry, who had been drinking in the Dáil bar, provokes international headlines after pulling party colleague Áine Collins onto his lap on live television during a late-night Dáil debate. Fine Gael later describe the incident was "silly" and "horseplay". However, the event sparks a national discussion about the treatment of women by men in Irish politics.

=== August ===
- 5 August – In a Sunday Times interview, journalist and businessman Vincent Browne criticises programmes about Travellers broadcast by his employer TV3, saying, "To say it was embarrassing doesn't begin to describe it. I squirmed and I railed against it. The Travellers stuff is appalling, absolutely appalling." He also says that when he complained to TV3 executive Ben Frow, the latter was "just amused at my indignation, which meant I couldn't get anywhere with it".
- 22 August – TV3 announces plans to commission its first soap opera, and invites companies from Ireland and the UK to put forward ideas. Submissions will be invited from September.
- 25 August – Research by Broadcasting Authority of Ireland shows most viewers are still watching television on traditional sets; only 4.6% view content online.
- 26 August – The latest figures from UTV Media show its half yearly profits fell by 10%, with its radio advertising revenue in both Britain and Ireland continuing to decline.
- 27 August – The Government of the 31st Dáil publishes plans to replace the television licence with a Public Service Broadcasting Charge on all primary residences, and certain businesses. Holiday and second-home owners are likely to be exempted from the charge, with the onus to pay it on the occupier.

=== September ===
- 11 September – Aertv launches the first app that enables viewers to receive free streamed content of all Irish broadcast material.
- 20 September – Fifteenth anniversary of the launch of TV3.

=== October ===
- 18 October – RTÉ Gaelic football pundit Joe Brolly says that it is "nobody else's business" if GAA clubs or tournaments are named after dead republican paramilitaries, after some Unionist politicians criticised the practice as glorifying terrorism. The comments come in the wake of First Minister of Northern Ireland Peter Robinson's attendance at a Co-Operation Ireland dinner held the previous evening to acknowledge the efforts of the GAA in building better community relations.
- 28 October – Singer Edele Lynch wins TV3's Celebrity Apprentice Ireland.

=== November ===
- 6 November – UTV Media announces plans to launch UTV Ireland, a television channel targeting audiences within the Republic of Ireland. If given the go-ahead by the Broadcasting Authority of Ireland, the channel will be on air from 2015, and will show some ITV content currently broadcast by TV3.
- 7 November – A total of 16 production companies have submitted ideas to TV3 for a twice-weekly soap, including Lime Productions, which produces Channel 4's teen soap Hollyoaks, the Irish Times reports.
- 7 November – Stephen Chisholm wins the first series of TV3's The Great Irish Bake Off.
- 14 November – Saorview relaunches its website in order to encourage viewers who have not done so yet to switch to digital television.

=== December ===
- 8 December – The Sunday Independent reports that James Bond will return to terrestrial television at Christmas after RTÉ signed a deal with MGM and Sony to air the films, and the expiry of BSkyB's exclusive rights to the franchise.
- 9 December – Joe Mulholland, a former managing director of RTÉ expresses concerns about the effect of cutbacks on the quality of programming produced by the broadcaster, warning they are in "dangerous times".
- 16 December – Launch of RTÉ One HD.
- 18 December – Chief executive of the Irish Film Board, James Hickey reports that Ireland's film, television and animation industry generated €168 million worth of activity in 2013, an 18 per cent increase on 2012 and its best year to date.
- 22 December – Jockey Tony McCoy is named the 2013 RTÉ Sports Person of the Year.
- 28 December – Ratings for 25 December indicate that comedian Brendan O'Carroll's show Mrs. Brown's Boys achieved the highest Christmas Day viewing figures in both Ireland and the UK. With a viewership of 832,000, it topped the Irish ratings for the third year in a row, while in the UK the episode, titled Buckin' Mammy achieved an audience of 9.4 million.

== Debuts ==
=== RTÉ ===
- 3 January – Jimmy's Winnin' Matches on RTÉ One (2013)
- 28 January – Morning Edition on RTÉ One (2013–2014)
- 12 May – The Fall on RTÉ One (2013–2016)
- 14 July – Celebrity MasterChef Ireland on RTÉ One (2013)
- 26 July – The Hit on RTÉ One (2013)
- 10 September – Second Captains Live on RTÉ Two (2013–present)

=== TV3 ===
- 4 January – The Holiday Show (2013)
- 7 January – Deception (2013–present)
- 12 February – On the Couch (2013)
- 19 September – The Great Irish Bake Off (2013–2015)
- 23 September – Celebrity Apprentice Ireland (2013)

=== TG4 ===
- 1 September – Raa Raa the Noisy Lion (2011–2018)
- 6 September – The Amazing World of Gumball (2011–2019)

== Ongoing television programmes ==
=== 1960s ===
- RTÉ News: Nine O'Clock (1961–present)
- RTÉ News: Six One (1962–present)
- The Late Late Show (1962–present)

=== 1970s ===
- The Late Late Toy Show (1975–present)
- RTÉ News on Two (1978–2014)
- The Sunday Game (1979–present)

=== 1980s ===
- Fair City (1989–present)
- RTÉ News: One O'Clock (1989–present)

=== 1990s ===
- Would You Believe (1990s–present)
- Winning Streak (1990–present)
- Prime Time (1992–present)
- Nuacht RTÉ (1995–present)
- Nuacht TG4 (1996–present)
- Ros na Rún (1996–present)
- TV3 News (1998–present)
- Ireland AM (1999–present)
- Telly Bingo (1999–present)

=== 2000s ===
- Nationwide (2000–present)
- TV3 News at 5.30 (2001–present) – now known as the 5.30
- Against the Head (2003–present)
- news2day (2003–present)
- Other Voices (2003–present)
- Saturday Night with Miriam (2005–present)
- The Week in Politics (2006–present)
- Tonight with Vincent Browne (2007–2017)
- Xposé (2007–present)
- At Your Service (2008–present)
- Championship Live (2008–present) – Now rebranded as GAA on 3
- Midday (2008–2016)
- Operation Transformation (2008–present)
- 3e News (2009–present)
- Dragons' Den (2009–present)
- Midweek (2009–2014)
- Republic of Telly (2009–2016)
- Two Tube (2009–present)

=== 2010s ===
- Irish Pictorial Weekly (2012–present)
- Jack Taylor (2010–present)
- Love/Hate (2010–present)
- The Saturday Night Show (2010–2015)
- Mrs. Brown's Boys (2011–present)
- The GAA Show (2011–present)
- MasterChef Ireland (2011–present)
- Paul Connolly Investigates (2011–2015)
- Championship Matters (2012–present)
- Family Fortunes (2012–2014)
- Today (2012–present)
- The Mario Rosenstock Show (2012–2016)
- The Voice of Ireland (2012–2016)
- The Works (2011–present)

== Ending this year ==
- 4 January – OMG! Jedward's Dream Factory (2011–2013)
- 10 January – Dublin Wives (2012–2013)
- 28 January - One to One (2006–2013)
- 29 January – The Frontline (2009–2013)
- 8 February – The Holiday Show (2013)
- 10 February - Raw (2008–2013)
- 8 March – Take Me Out (2010–2013)
- 9 April – On the Couch (2013)
- May – Premier Soccer Saturday (1998–2013)
- 13 June – Come Dine with Me (2011–2013) and Celebrity Come Dine with Me (2012–2013)
- August – The Big Money Game (2008–2013)
- 30 August - The Hit (2013)
- 27 September - The Morning Show with Sybil & Martin (2009–2013)
- October - Monday Night Soccer (2008–2013)

== Deaths ==
- 27 January – Éamon de Buitléar, 83, writer, and film and documentary maker

== See also ==
- 2013 in Ireland
