= The Great Irish Bake Off series 2 =

The Great Irish Bake Off
- Series 2
- Presented by: Anna Nolan
- Judges: Biddy White Lennon; Paul Kelly
- No. of episodes: 8

Release
- Original network: TV3
- Original release: 21 May – 9 July 2014

Series chronology
- ← Previous; Series 1 Next → Series 3

Series 2 of The Great Irish Bake Off, aired on TV3 and saw twelve home bakers take part in a bake-off to test every aspect of their baking skills as they battled to be crowned The Great Irish Bake Off's best amateur baker. Each week saw keen bakers put through two challenges in a particular discipline. The series aired from 21 May 2014 till 9 July 2014.

== The Bakers ==
Baker	Age	Occupation	Hometown
Alex Fitzpatrick	17	Student	Rathfarnham, Dublin
Ali Mitter	33	IT Sales	Bray, Co Wicklow
David Murphy	28	Petrol station attendant	Dublin
Elaine Hartigan	56	Retired	Rathfarnham, Dublin
Hazel Ryan	31	Teacher	Corbally, Limerick
Jenny Donohoe	30	Self-employed Craft Teacher	Ranelagh, Dublin
Khade Idogho	25	Google Account Manager (UK)	Dublin
Poppy O’Sullivan	22	Student	Dublin
Shane Murray	27	Student & Waiter	Lusk, County Dublin
Tala Zilberman	29	Google Legal Assistant	Dublin
Tracy Coyne	41	Banker	Killarney, Co Kerry
Treasa Walsh	58	Palliative Care Nurse	Irishtown, Dublin

== Results summary ==
Elimination chart
Baker	1	2	3	4	5	6	7	8
Tracy		SB				SB		WINNER
Ali							SB	Runner-Up
Shane					SB			Runner-Up
Alex	SB			SB			OUT	
Poppy			SB				OUT	
Khade						OUT		
Hazel						OUT		
Tala				OUT				
Treasa			OUT					
Jenny		OUT						
David		OUT						
Elaine	OUT							

Colour key:

Got through to the next round
Awarded Star Baker
The baker was eliminated
Series Runner-up
Series Winner

NOTE: No one was eliminated in episode 5 because Hazel became ill and didn't complete the technical challenge.

== Episodes ==
Baker eliminated
Star Baker
Winner

=== Episode 1: Cake ===
Baker	Signature (Three Layered Cake)	Technical (Lemon and Rosewater Battenberg Cake)
Alex	Chocolate, Coffee & Bacon Cake	3rd
Ali	Black Forest Gateau Inspired Chocolate & Sour Cherry Cake	10th
David	Raspberry & Strawberry Sponge with Fondant Icing	6th
Elaine	"Nuts About Chocolate" Cake	11th
Hazel	—N/a	7th
Jenny	"Cassette Cake" with Chocolate & Vanilla Layers, Hazelnut Meringue & Praline Buttercream	2nd
Khade	Salted Caramel, Chocolate & Peanut Nougat Cake	4th
Poppy	Chocolate Chiffon Cake with Raspberry & Hazelnut	5th
Shane	Pistachio & Cherry Gateau with a Kirsch Buttercream	1st
Tala	—N/a	9th
Tracy	Chocolate Orange Cake	8th
Treasa	"Citrus Burst Cake" with Layers of Orange, Hazelnut & Rosemary, Lemon & Giger, Lime & Pistachio	12th

=== Episode 2: Pastry ===
Baker	Technical (Dingle Pie)	Showstopper (Savory and Sweet Pastry Bakes)
Alex	4th	Full Irish Inspired Pie served with Green & Yellow Tomato Ketchup; Strawberry Tart with Strawberry Curd, Vanilla Creme Patissier
Ali	9th	Duck Confit & Pork Pie with Pancetta & Port Figs; Praline Tartelletes with Pear & Ginger Compote
David	6th	Broccoli & Bacon Pie with Mozzarella and Pine Kernels Topping; Velvet Mocha Tart
Hazel	7th	Spinach, Ricotta and Pinenut Tart
Jenny	10th	Butternut Squash, Feta and Kale Filo Anchor; Spiced Apple & Pear, Pecan Crumble 'Pie-rate' Ship with Lavender Custard
Khade	11th	Strawberry and Mango Cream Cheese Tart
Poppy	1st	Sun Blushed Tomato, Spinach, Goats Cheese & Caramelised Onion Puff Lattice
Shane	3rd	Rhubarb, Custard & Elderflower Meringue Pie 99s Salmon Encroute
Tala	8th	—N/a
Tracy	2nd	Raised Picnic Pie with Chicken & Ham; Eastern Rhubarb Frangipane Tart
Treasa	5th	Lemon and Raspberry Tar with Crème Patissiere

=== Episode 3: Biscuits ===
Baker	Signature (Sweet and Savory Biscuits)	Technical (Checkerboard Cookies)
Alex	Spelt, Basil, & Parmesan Biscuits Filled with Tomato Jam; Wagon Wheels with Rosewater Marshmallows & Chocolate Squares	2nd
Ali	Savory Sticks with Garlic & Cheese; Walnut Biscuit Rolls with Caramel Cream &Chantilly Cream Fillings	5th
Hazel	Black Pepper Oat Cakes; Limerick Lavender Butter Cookies	6th
Khade	Pimento & Cheddar Biscuits; Chocolate HobNobs	7th
Poppy	Feta, Mint, & Basil Leaves; Vanilla Black Forest Viennese Sandwichs	4th
Shane	Gruyere, Pistachio, & Rosemary Sticks	3rd
Tala	Petit Beurre Maision	8th
Tracy	Popcorn Crackers "Not" Caffreys Teacakes	1st
Treasa	Cointreau, Orange, & Cardamom Fig Rolls; Parmesan, Basil, & Onion Shortbread	9th

=== Episode 4: Continental ===
Baker	Technical (Apple & Ginger Strudel with Honey & Walnut Cream)	Showstopper (Choux Pastry)
Alex	3rd	Viking Longboat with Chocolate and Black Tea Crème Patissière
Ali	5th	Peacock Filled with Flavours of Lemon Curd & Raspberry, Rosewater and Lychee, Orange Blossom & Kumquat
Hazel	7th	Gardener's Basket with Pistachio & Rosewater Cream
Khade	4th	Liffey View with Lemon Cream Filling, Macaron Cobblestones & Nougatine Road
Poppy	1st	"An Afternoon Tea"
Shane	6th	Beehive with Lavender, Orange, & Honey Crème Patissière
Tala	8th	Jenga Tower with Chocolate & Halva Mousse
Tracy	2nd	Fruit Basket Filled with Flavoured Choux 'Fruits'

=== Episode 5: Bread ===
Baker	Signature (Sweet & Savory Breads)	Technical (Caramelised Onion Bagels & Poppy Seed Bagels)
Alex	Toffee Apple Tear & Share Loaf with Caramel Sauce	6th
Ali	Indian Paneer Kulcha; Traditional Czech 'Kolache' with Walnut, Poppy Seed & Plum Jam Filling	1st
Hazel	Cheddar Chive Loaf with Guinness; Cinnamon Breakfast Bread	—N/a
Khade	Chorizo, Spinach & Feta Loaf	5th
Poppy	Orange, White Chocolate & Apricot Bouquet; Savory Four Cheese Loaf	3rd
Shane	Ginger, Lime & Coconut Twisted Loaf; Parsnip, Parmesan & Truffle Oil Bread	2nd
Tracy	Crafty Beer & Banana Bread; Indian Street Roll with Curry Sauce & Cucumber Salsa	4th

NOTE: Hazel did not finish the Technical Challenge as she became ill.

=== Episode 6: Classic Baking ===
Baker	Technical (Pear Tarte Tatin)	Showstopper (Surprise Cake)
Alex	4th	It's Called Art! (Orange & Almond Madeira)
Ali	1st	Pink Champagne Surprise Chiffon Cake
Hazel	7th	—N/a
Khade	2nd	Arsenal Stadium Cake
Poppy	6th	Night Sky Cake (Layered Orange Sponge Cake with Orange Chocolate Ganache)
Shane	3rd	Summer Bunting Cake
Tracy	5th	White Chocolate Box with Tiffany Surprises Inside

NOTE: Hazel was eliminated after the Technical Challenge and did not participate in the Showstopper.

=== Episode 7: Desserts (Semi Final) ===
Baker	Signature (Summer Dinner Party Dessert)	Technical (Strawberry Charlotte Russe)
Alex	Raspberry & White Chocolate Opera Cake with Pistachio Praline Tuiles	5th
Ali	Oversized Raspberry Macarons, Raspberry Mint Sorbet & White Chocolate Lemon Truffles	2nd
Poppy	Mango, Lime & Chilli Mousse Gateau	4th
Shane	Two Tier Summer Trifle	3rd
Tracy	Summer "Candy Crush" Bombe	1st

=== Episode 8: Final ===
Baker	Technical (Rainbow Macaron Tower)	Showstopper (Afternoon Tea)
Ali	3rd	'From the Woods to the Sea'; Lobster on Brioche with Homemade Lemon Mayonnaise; Blackberry Bakewell Frangipane; Blueberry Streusel Scone
Shane	2nd	'Around the World in Eleven Bites'; Vodka Salmon on Dill Bread with Caviar & Beetroot; Choux with Icewine-poached Pears and Honey Walnut Cream; Passionfruit Cheesecake with a Hazelnut Brownie Base
Tracy	1st	'From Valencia to Tinakilly'; Open Crab Brûlèe with a Parmesan Crisp & Pickled Cucumber; Plain Scone with a Brown Sugar Crust; Choux Bun with Baileys & Chocolate Topped with Red Sable Pastry

=== The Great Irish Christmas Bake Off ===
Anna Nolan hosts a Christmas special in which regular judges Biddy White Lennon and Paul Kelly don the aprons and take contrasting approaches to baking for the festive season. It aired on 17 December 2014.

	Bake 1	Bake 2	Bake 3	Bake 4	Bake 5	Bake 6	Bake 7
Biddy	Traditional Mince Pies	Christmas Plum Pudding	—N/a	—N/a	Gingerbread Men & Houses	—N/a	—N/a
Paul	Poached Pear with Chocolate Mousse and Star Anise	Christmas Tree Pavlova	Floating Islands with Sloe Berries	Brioche Cinnamon Doughnuts with Lemon Curd	Gingerbread Men & Houses	Edible Christmas Decorations	White Chocolate Snowmen
