= Back to Reality (TV series) =

- Presented by: Tess Daly; Richard Bacon
- No. of days: 20
- No. of housemates: 12
- Winner: James Hewitt
- Runner-up: Maureen Rees

Release
- Original network: Five
- Original release: 15 February – 5 March 2004

Back to Reality is a reality television show featuring stars from previous reality television programmes. The show was broadcast on Channel 5 between 15 February 2004 to 5 March 2004.

It was advertised by Channel 5 as being "The biggest reality show of all time" however in terms of ratings, it failed to deliver. The 12 contestants spent 3 weeks in a studio built mansion, with no natural sunlight. In the final two weeks, the public voted for their favourite housemate with the two people with the lowest votes every 3/4 nights being put to the housemate vote, where the other contestants had to vote for who they wanted to leave. The show was presented by Tess Daly and Richard Bacon, the first and only series of the show finished with James Hewitt winning the show ahead of Maureen Rees and Craig Phillips.

== Ratings ==
The ratings rarely went over 1.6 million despite the show extending its hours (early morning and afternoon live streaming). The lack of ratings was put down to the lack of tabloid interest in the show, despite the sponsoring of the show by popular celebrity magazine 'Heat' and the constant arguments and major events that happened in the house.

== Highlights ==
Events included the threatened walk-out of the contestants after Nick Bateman was referred to as "Nasty Nick", the planned addition of Jade Goody's then boyfriend Jeff Brazier (from the reality TV show Shipwrecked) as a thirteenth contestant, Uri Geller walking out, the suspicion of Josie d'Arby being a mole (and the subsequent arguments and divides), the love interest between James Hewitt and Sarah Kozer, the rushing of Jade Goody to hospital and the "Ricardo Incident" when the flamboyant cross-dresser Ricardo Ribero argued with other housemates and then proceeded to destroy the kitchen. The show ended when the public voted The Games star James Hewitt to be the winner with Maureen Rees coming second.

== Aftermath ==
Since the show, Channel 5 confessed that Back to Reality was an expensive but worthwhile experiment however it is unlikely to return. Goody's aggression towards Rik Waller in the series, though attracting little comment at the time, was later cited as evidence that she was a serial bully following her appearance in Celebrity Big Brother. However they only actually had one row and made up soon afterwards for the duration of the series.

== Contestants ==
| Celebrity | Previous show |
|---|---|
| Catalina Guirado | I'm a Celebrity...Get Me Out of Here! |
| Craig Phillips | Big Brother 1 |
| Jade Goody | Big Brother 3 |
| James Hewitt | The Games |
| Josie D'Arby | The Games |
| Lizzy Bardsley | Wife Swap |
| Maureen Rees | Driving School |
| Nick Bateman | Big Brother 1 |
| Ricardo Ribeiro | The Salon |
| Rik Waller | Pop Idol 1 |
| Sarah Kozer | Joe Millionaire |
| Uri Geller | I'm a Celebrity...Get Me Out of Here! |

== Eviction table ==
| | Day 8 | Day 9 | Day 10 | Day 11 | Day 12 | Day 16 | Day 17 | Day 18 | Final Day 20 | Votes received |
|---|---|---|---|---|---|---|---|---|---|---|
| James | Nick | Lizzy | Catalina | Josie | Josie | Rik | Josie | Jade | Winner (Day 20) | 0 |
| Maureen | Nick | Sarah | Catalina | Sarah | Ricardo | Rik | Bottom two | Bottom two | Runner-Up (Day 20) | 0 |
| Craig | Catalina | Lizzy | Catalina | Sarah | Ricardo | Rik | Josie | Jade | Third Place (Day 20) | 0 |
| Jade | Nick | Sarah | Catalina | Sarah | Ricardo | Rik | Josie | Bottom two | Evicted (Day 18) | 2 |
| Josie | Nick | Sarah | Bottom two | Bottom two | Bottom two | Bottom two | Bottom two | Evicted (Day 17) | | 8 |
| Rik | Catalina | Sarah | Josie | Sarah | Ricardo | Bottom two | Evicted (Day 16) | | | 4 |
| Ricardo | Nick | Lizzy | Josie | Sarah | Bottom two | Evicted (Day 12) | | | | 4 |
| Sarah | Nick | Bottom two | Josie | Bottom two | Evicted (Day 11) | | | | | 9 |
| Catalina | Bottom two | Lizzy | Bottom two | Evicted (Day 10) | | | | | | 6 |
| Lizzy | Nick | Bottom two | Evicted (Day 9) | | | | | | | 4 |
| Nick | Bottom two | Evicted (Day 8) | | | | | | | | 7 |
| Uri | Walked (Day 7) | | | | | | | | | 0 |
| Notes | none | 1 | none | none | none | none | none | none | none | |
| Nominated | Catalina, Nick | Lizzy, Sarah | Catalina, Josie | Josie, Sarah | Josie, Ricardo | Josie, Rik | Josie, Maureen | Jade, Maureen | Craig, James, Maureen | |
| Walked | Uri | none | | | | | | | | |
| Evicted | Nick; 7 of 9 votes to evict | Lizzy; 4 of 8 votes to evict | Catalina; 4 of 7 votes to evict | Sarah; 5 of 6 votes to evict | Ricardo; 4 of 5 votes to evict | Rik; 4 of 4 votes to evict | Josie; 3 of 3 votes to evict | Jade; 2 of 2 votes to evict | Craig; Fewest votes to win | |
| Evicted | Nick; 7 of 9 votes to evict | Lizzy; 4 of 8 votes to evict | Catalina; 4 of 7 votes to evict | Sarah; 5 of 6 votes to evict | Ricardo; 4 of 5 votes to evict | Rik; 4 of 4 votes to evict | Josie; 3 of 3 votes to evict | Jade; 2 of 2 votes to evict | Maureen; Fewest votes to win | |
| Evicted | Nick; 7 of 9 votes to evict | Lizzy; 4 of 8 votes to evict | Catalina; 4 of 7 votes to evict | Sarah; 5 of 6 votes to evict | Ricardo; 4 of 5 votes to evict | Rik; 4 of 4 votes to evict | Josie; 3 of 3 votes to evict | Jade; 2 of 2 votes to evict | James; Most votes to win | |

=== Notes ===
- ^Note 1: James, who received the most votes after the vote count, had to break the tie in order for either Lizzy or Sarah to be evicted.
