= The Great Irish Bake Off series 1 =

The Great Irish Bake Off
- Series 1
- Presented by: Anna Nolan
- Judges: Biddy White Lennon; Paul Kelly
- No. of episodes: 8

Release
- Original network: TV3
- Original release: 19 September – 7 November 2013

Series chronology
- Next → Series 2

Series 1 of The Great Irish Bake Off aired on TV3 in Ireland and saw twelve home bakers take part in a bake-off to test every aspect of their baking skills as they battled to be crowned The Great Irish Bake Off's best amateur baker. Each week saw keen bakers put through two challenges in a particular discipline. The series aired from 19 September 2013 till 7 November 2013, and saw Stephen Chisholm win.

== The Bakers ==
Baker	Age	Occupation	Hometown
Aoife Nic Aonghusa	25	Capital Forecasting Analyst	Carbury, Kildare
Barbara Dolan	37	Stay-at-home Mom	Balbriggan
Bridget Harney	28	Occupational Therapist	Holywood, Wicklow
Daire Begley	42	Quality Control Manager	Dublin
Jarek Orlowski	30	Bartender	Kilkenny, born in Poland
Laura Carroll	17	Student	Donaghmede
Maryanne Dalton	36	Lab Manager	Killiney, Dublin
Oonagh Barrett	43	Adult education teacher	Kellistown, Carlow
Stephen Chisholm	21	Student	Belfast
Steve Twydell	42	Special Care Assistant	Sligo, born in the UK
Tom Walton	27	Psychology Research Assistant & Assistant Psychologist	Kilkenny
Will De Korte	29	—	Limerick

== Results summary ==
Elimination chart
Baker	1	2	3	4	5	6	7	8
Stephen			SB			SB		WINNER
Maryanne	SB						SB	Runner-Up
Will				SB				Runner-Up
Oonagh		SB					OUT	
Aoife					SB	OUT		
Barbara						OUT		
Jarek					OUT			
Steve				OUT				
Bridget				OUT				
Tom			OUT					
Daire		OUT						
Laura	OUT							

Colour key:

Got through to the next round
Awarded Star Baker
The baker was eliminated
Series Runner-up
Series Winner

== Episodes ==
Baker eliminated
Star Baker
Winner

=== Episode 1: Cakes ===
Baker	Signature (12 Cupcakes)	Technical (Genoise Sponge Cake)
Aoife	Guinness Cupcakes; Red Velvet Cupcakes	—
Barbara	—	—
Bridget	Lemon & Raspberry Cupcakes; Pina Colada Cupcakes	11th
Daire	Lemon & White Chocolate Cupcakes; Coffee & Ginger Cupcakes	—
Jarek	Chocolate & Buttered Cream Cupcakes; Vanilla & Lime Cupcakes	—
Laura	Jaffa Cake Cupcakes; Salted Caramel Cupcakes	12th
Maryanne	Banoffee Cupcakes; After Eight Cupcakes	2nd
Oonagh	Elderflower & Raspberry Cupcakes; Chocolate Espresso Cupcakes	—
Stephen	Passion Fruit Cupcakes; German Carrot Cupcakes	1st
Steve	Lime & Chocolate Kiddie Cupcakes; Chocolate & Cherry Cupcakes	—
Tom	—	—
Will	Blackberry & Chocolate Cupcakes	—

=== Episode 2: Tarts ===
Baker	Technical (Pistachio & Raspberry Bakewell Tart)	Showstopper (Savoury & Sweet Tart)
Aoife	11th	Goats Cheese, Potato & Chorizo Tart; Strawberry, Mascarpone & Rhubarb Compote Tart
Barbara	4th	Smoked Coley, Leek & New Potato Quiche; Spiced Pear, Caramel & Chocolate Tart
Bridget	5th	Orange & Chocolate Tart
Daire	6th	Salmon, Leek & Red Onion Tart; Apple & Blackberry Tart
Jarek	9th	Strawberry Tart
Maryanne	7th	Caramelised Red Onion & Mediterranean Tart; White Chocolate & Raspberry Tart
Oonagh	1st	Black Pudding & Pear Tarte Tatin; Peach, Almond & Ameretto Tart
Stephen	8th	Exotic Fruit Tart with Swiss Meringue
Steve	2nd	Smoked Haddock & Sweetcorn Tart; Chocolate, Pear & Apple Tart
Tom	3rd	Black Pudding, Beetroot & Blue Cheese Tart; Zesty Chocolate Tart
Will	10th	Profiterole Tart with Salted Caramel

=== Episode 3: Bread ===
Baker	Signature (Soda Bread, Non-yeasted Bread with Irish ingredients, & Tea Bread)	Technical (Tear-and-Share Party Bread)
Aoife	Apple, Cinnamon and Pear Toffee Loaf	2nd
Barbara	—	8th
Bridget	Wholemeal Soda Bread; Potato, Cheese and Onion Soda Bread; Tea Bread with Plums and Apricots	5th
Jarek	Bacon, Onion and Basil Loaf	7th
Maryanne	Pear, Parmesan and Thyme Loaf	1st
Oonagh	—	3rd
Stephen	Mango Tea Loaf; Leek and Gruyère Wholemeal Soda Bread; Belfast Stout Wheaten Bread	4th
Steve	Lemon, Walnut and Blackberry Tea Bread	10th
Tom	Nutty Black Treacle Spelt Bread; Rosemary and Spring Onion Wholemeal Soda Bread; Earl Grey Tea Bread	6th
Will	Garlic and Olive White Soda Bread	9th

=== Episode 4: Desserts ===
Baker	Technical (Apple and Cider Pudding with Elderflower Custard)	Signature (Dessert Trio: Crumble, Roulade, & Bread-based Dessert)
Aoife	5th	Blueberry, Raspberry and Apple Crumble Jars; Hazelnut Meringue Roulade with Chocolate Rum Cream; Maple Swirl Buns with Pecan Topping
Barbara	3rd	Rhubarb and Ginger Struesel Tart; Red Velvet and Rosewater Roulade
Bridget	9th	Rhubarb, Ginger and Orange Crumble Pie; Lime, Coconut and Passionfruit Roulade; Butterscotch Brioche
Jarek	8th	Pear Crumble; Bailey's Irish Cream and Chocolate Roulade; Mama's Strudel
Maryanne	6th	Baked Strawberry Cheesecake; Lemon and Passionfruit Meringue Roulade; Bailey's Irish Cream Bread and Butter Pudding
Oonagh	7th	Strawberry and Pistachio Crumble; Matcha and Green Tea Roulade with Lime Curd and Mascarpone; Banana and Bourbon Bread Pudding
Stephen	1st	Banana Butterscotch Crumble; Toffee Pecan Roulade; Tiramisu Bread Pudding
Steve	4th	Orange, Banana and Ginger Crumble; Lemon Curd Roulade with Raspberry Meringue; Guinness and Chocolate Bread Pudding
Will	2nd	Sticky Tear-and-Share Bread

=== Episode 5: Chocolate ===
Baker	Signature (Chocolate Cake)	Technical (Trio of Chocolate Bavarois)
Aoife	Chocolate & Raspberry Celebration Cake	2nd
Barbara	Chocolate Pistachio Flourless Sponge	3rd
Jarek	White Chocolate Ganache	6th
Maryanne	Chocolate Cake with Hazelnut & Praline	7th
Oonagh	Chocolate Orange Cake	1st
Stephen	Striped Chocolate Opera Cake	4th
Will	Chocolate Bundt Cake with Honeycomb	5th

=== Episode 6: Patisserie ===
Baker	Technical (Millefeuille)	Showstopper (Croquembouche)
Aoife	5th	'Simply Buzzing' Croquembouche with Tia Maria Cream & Honeycomb
Barbara	6th	Vanilla Flavoured Croquembouche with Layers of Marble Chocolate
Maryanne	1st	Orange, Cardamom & White Chocolate Croquembouche
Oonagh	2nd	Lemon Saffron Crème Patisserie & Dark Chocolate Croquembouche Present
Stephen	4th	Traditional Croquembouche filled with an Amaretto Crème Patisserie
Will	3rd	Windmill Croquembouche with Grand Marnier & Limoncello Choux Buns

=== Episode 7: Semi Final ===
Baker	Signature (Bake Off Journey Cake)	Technical (Crab & Sea Beet Tart with Wild Garlic Leaves & a Zabaione of White Wine and Rock Samphire, Carrageenan Mousse with a Berry Compote garnished with Crystallized Wildflowers, and Whiskey Snaps)
Maryanne	Frazier Inspired Journey Cake	2nd
Oonagh	Star Anise, Chocolate, Lime & Champagne Cake	3rd
Stephen	Blueberry Chiffon Cake	4th
Will	Chiffon Cake Decorated with Dutch Flag buttercream Icing	1st

=== Episode 8: Final ===
Baker	Technical (Petit Four of Vanilla Fudge, Poppy Seed Tuiles, Fruit Tartlets, and Salted Caramel White Chocolate Lollipops)	Showstopper (Natural Landscape or Built Heritage of Ireland Bake)
Maryanne	1st	Dublin Georgian Door Carrot Cake with a Walnut Frosting & Buttercream Cream Cheese Frosting
Stephen	2nd	Dunluce Castle Gingerbread Construction 'Cemented' with Royal Icing
Will	3rd	Hook Lighthouse sitting in Chocolate Waves & Edible Sand
