= The Great Irish Bake Off series 3 =

The Great Irish Bake Off
- Series 3
- Presented by: Anna Nolan
- Judges: Lilly Higgins; Paul Kelly
- No. of episodes: 8

Release
- Original network: TV3
- Original release: 25 October – 13 December 2015

Series chronology
- ← Previous; Series 2

Series 3 of The Great Irish Bake Off aired on TV3 in Ireland and saw twelve home bakers take part in a bake-off to test every aspect of their baking skills as they battled to be crowned The Great Irish Bake Off's best amateur baker. Each week saw keen bakers put through two challenges in a particular discipline. The series aired from 25 October 2015 till 13 December 2015. This season was presented by Anna Nolan and judged by Paul Kelly and Lilly Higgins.

== The Bakers ==
| Baker | Age | Occupation | Hometown |
|---|---|---|---|
| Ailish Carrigan | 41 | Accountant | Capoley, Portlaoise |
| Cathy McKenna | 27 | Former Restaurant Manager | Monaghan |
| Clare Ryan | 32 | Primary School Teacher | Fedamore |
| Damien Carter | 31 | Teacher | Ballinakill |
| Darina Coffey | 27 | PhD Student | Killarney |
| Emer Hough | 32 | Financial Advisor | Limerick |
| Fíonnadh McGonigle | 31 | Architect | Monaghan |
| James Gavin | 23 | Student | Kildare |
| Nathasha Dawson | 17 | Student | Glenties |
| Neil Reid | 36 | Sales and Marketing Executive | Dublin |
| Sandra McGarry | 44 | IT Tutor | Navan |
| Sandra O'Reilly | 51 | Playschool Teacher | Malahide, Dublin |

== Results summary ==
Elimination chart
| Baker | 1 | 2^{[a]} | 3 | 4 | 5 | 6 | 7 | 8 |
|---|---|---|---|---|---|---|---|---|
| Cathy | | | | | SB | | | WINNER |
| Clare | | SB | | SB | | | SB | Runner-Up |
| Emer | | | | | | SB | | Runner-Up |
| Fíonnadh | SB | | | | | | OUT | |
| James | | | | | | | OUT | |
| Neil | | | | | | OUT | | |
| Sandra O. | | | SB | | OUT | | | |
| Damien | | | | OUT | | | | |
| Darina | | | | OUT | | | | |
| Nathasha | | | OUT | | | | | |
| Ailish | | WD | | | | | | |
| Sandra M. | OUT | | | | | | | |

^[a]Ailish left the show in episode 2 due to illness.

Colour key:

Got through to the next round
Awarded Star Baker
The baker was eliminated
Baker withdrew from the show
Series Runner-up
Series Winner

== Episodes ==
Baker eliminated
Baker withdrew from the competition
Star Baker
Winner

=== Episode 1: Desserts ===
| Baker | Signature (Memorable Moments Desert) | Technical (Mango and Passionfruit Cheesecake) |
|---|---|---|
| Ailish | Red Velvet Sponge with Cardomon Cheesecake & Swiss Meringue | 8th |
| Cathy | Monaghan Rose & Peach Curd Tart with Pistachio Caramel Crunch | 1st |
| Clare | Raspberry, Lemon & Coconut Layered Cake with Chocolate Drool | 7th |
| Damien | Stranofficomb Pie | 9th |
| Darina | Dark Chocolate Pavlova Tower with Framboise Ganache, Berries & Pistachio Praline | 12th |
| Emer | Neopolitan & Almond flavoured Sandcastle with Swiss Meringue & Cupcakes 99s | 5th |
| Fíonnadh | Pumpkin Croquembouche | 2nd |
| James | Courtesan Au Chocolat with Neapolitan Crème Patissière | 6th |
| Nathasha | Chocolate Orange & Hazelnut Tart | 3rd |
| Neil | Dark Chocolate & Raspberry Pie | 10th |
| Sandra M. | Blackberry & White Chocolate Trifle Cake | 11th |
| Sandra O. | Apple Spice Blondie Cheesecake | 4th |

=== Episode 2: Cakes ===
| Baker | Technical (Adults Only Coffee Cake) | Showstopper (Halloween Cake) |
|---|---|---|
| Ailish | N/A | N/A |
| Cathy | 2nd | Samhain Apple Bonfire Cake with Druids Buttercream and Pomegranate Drizzle |
| Clare | 1st | Little Monster |
| Damien | 10th | Black Church Cake |
| Darina | 8th | Chocolate Guinness Spider Cake |
| Emer | 9th | Bones & Tombstones |
| Fíonnadh | 4th | Skeleton Arm Surprise |
| James | 7th | Toffee Apple Cake |
| Nathasha | 5th | Trick or Treat Cake |
| Neil | 6th | Phantom of the Opera Coffin Cake |
| Sandra O. | 3rd | Till Death us do Part |

NOTE: Ailish felt ill during the Technical and didn't finish the challenge. Before the Showstopper, Anna announced that she would not be continuing in the competition. No one was eliminated after the Showstopper.

=== Episode 3: Bread ===
| Baker | Signature (Stuffed Savoury Picnic Loaf) | Technical (Stollen Bread) |
|---|---|---|
| Cathy | Indian Tiger Bfread | 1st |
| Clare | Braided Italian Picnic Loaf | 10th |
| Damien | Popeye's Bread | 9th |
| Darina | A Rare Affair | 3rd |
| Emer | Market Burger Loaf | 7th |
| Fíonnadh | Roasted Veggie Garlic and Herb Bread | 8th |
| James | Al Fresco Anti Pasti Filled Picnic Load | 4th |
| Nathasha | Italian Tortano Style Stuffed Picnic Loaf with Basil and Pine Nut Pesto | 6th |
| Neil | Breakfast Loaf | 5th |
| Sandra O. | Breakfast Loaf | 2nd |

=== Episode 4: Chocolate ===
| Baker | Technical (Triple Chocolate Swiss Roll) | Showstopper (Chocolate Selection Box) |
|---|---|---|
| Cathy | 8th | Superfood Selection Box |
| Clare | 1st | Chocolate Truffle Box |
| Damien | 9th | Chocolate Chipper Box |
| Darina | 5th | Christmas in Killarney Box |
| Emer | 2nd | Boozy Party Box |
| Fíonnadh | 4th | Family Favourites Box |
| James | 6th | Favourites Box |
| Neil | 3rd | Irish Tastes & Inspirations |
| Sandra O. | 7th | Parent and Child Box |

=== Episode 5: International Week ===
| Baker | Signature (World Inspired Bake) | Technical (Pineapple Upside-Down Cake) |
|---|---|---|
| Cathy | Italian Favourites Cake | 3rd |
| Clare | French Fancies | 6th |
| Emer | American Pecan Pie Cake | 2nd |
| Fíonnadh | Cardamom, Rosewater & Chia Cake | 1st |
| James | Dobos Torte | 4th |
| Neil | Black Forest Gateaux | 5th |
| Sandra O. | Esterházy Torte | 7th |

=== Episode 6: Party Week ===
| Baker | Technical (Irish Pizzas & Calzones) | Showstopper (Mad Hatter's Tea Party) |
|---|---|---|
| Cathy | 1st | Mad Hatter's Tea Party |
| Clare | 4th | Mad Hatter's Tea Party |
| Emer | 3rd | Mad Hatter's Tea Party |
| Fíonnadh | 2nd | Mad Hatter's Tea Party |
| James | 6th | Mad Hatter's Tea Party |
| Neil | 5th | Mad Hatter's Tea Party |

=== Episode 7: Semi-Final ===
| Baker | Signature (Soufflé) | Technical (St. Honoré cake) |
|---|---|---|
| Cathy | Soufflé de Noël | 4th |
| Clare | Raspberry and Amaretto Soufflé | 2nd |
| Emer | Toffee Apple Soufflé | 5th |
| Fíonnadh | Coconut and Lime Soufflé | 1st |
| James | Strawberry and Dark Chocolate Soufflé | 3rd |

=== Episode 8: Final ===
| Baker | Technical (Deconstructed Apple Crumble) | Showstopper (Wedding Cake) |
|---|---|---|
| Cathy | 2nd | Harvest Moon Wedding Cake |
| Clare | 1st | His 'n' Hers Vintage Wedding Cake |
| Emer | 3rd | Love is Precious Wedding Cake |

=== Christmas Special 2015 ===
A special edition of the show for Christmas in which four celebrities bid for the title of Star Baker in the face of a seasonal challenge set by Paul Kelly and Lilly Higgins. It aired on 20 December 2015.

| Team | Celebrity | Challenge (Christmas Cookies) |
|---|---|---|
| Panto | Leanne Moore | WINNER |
| Panto | George McMahon | RUNNER-UP |
| Presenters | Martin King | RUNNER-UP |
| Presenters | Lucy Kennedy | RUNNER-UP |
