= Nasty Nick =

Nasty Nick may refer to:

- Nick Bateman (television personality), a contestant in Big Brother
- Nick Cotton, a character in EastEnders
