= Sarah Kozer =

American actress and model

- Born: Sarah Ann Kozer; 16 December 1973 (age 52); Hunker, Pennsylvania, United States
- Occupation: Reality TV star

Sarah Ann Kozer (born December 16, 1973) is a television personality best known for her appearance in the reality television series Joe Millionaire, finishing as the runner-up to Zora Andrich.

== Personal life ==
Kozer was born and raised in the Pittsburgh suburb of Hunker, Pennsylvania. She graduated from George Mason University with a degree in philosophy and women's studies and attended Southwestern University School of Law, without completing her law degree. She is also a strict vegetarian, and she has said she would not eat meat for money. (She later proved this in her reality TV career.)

== Career ==
She appeared in a cover-featured pictorial in the June 2003 issue of Playboy. After a legal battle over unauthorized use of her name and likeness, Kozer applied for and was approved for a US trademark on her name (US TM #3026990). She's appeared in a number of fetish films under the name "Cindy Schubert".

In January 2004, Kozer was chosen to participate on the British reality show Back to Reality, which aired on Channel 5 in the United Kingdom. During her time in the house, she had a modest "showmance" with contestant James Hewitt. She was later evicted before the series finale. After being voted out, it became known she had finished work on her first novel and was also working on a cook book. She also had an uncredited role as a groupie in Almost Famous.
