= Winnifrith =

Winnifrith is a surname. Notable people with the surname include:

- Iona Winnifrith (born 2011), British Paralympic swimmer
- Joan Boniface Winnifrith (1913–2004), birth name of Anna Lee, English-American actress
- John Winnifrith (1908–1994), British civil servant at the Ministry of Agriculture
- Tom Winnifrith (born 1968), British journalist, share tipster, and fund manager
