= Mission Beach =

Mission Beach may refer to:

== Places ==
- Mission Beach, Queensland, Australia
- Mission Beach, San Diego, California, United States

== Other ==
- Mission Beach USA, Irish reality television series
