= Maureen Rees =

Welsh television personality

- Born: 25 February 1942 (age 84); Cardiff, Wales
- Occupations: Television personality; cleaner
- Known for: Driving School
- Height: 5 ft 1 in (1.55 m)
- Spouse: David Rees (m. 1965)
- Children: 3

Maureen Rees (born 25 February 1942) is a British television personality from Cardiff, Wales, who was Britain's first reality-television star. She became prominent in the late 1990s after her appearances in two series of the BBC One docuseries Driving School, which had 12 million viewers. The series followed several individuals, located in either Bristol or South Wales, during their driving lessons through to the undertaking of their driving exam. Prior to the series, the Reeses had spent hundreds of pounds (quantified by Rees as 80% of her income) on lessons and four failed practical tests. During the series, Rees twice more failed to pass the test, as well as the driving theory exam. During the series, she received the nickname the driver from L.

Rees eventually passed on 6 June 1997, at the seventh attempt, in the last episode, in an automatic, though after the series finished she also passed a test in manual-transmission vehicle.

== Early life ==
Born on Milton Street in the Roath area of Cardiff, the first child of Beatrice and Thomas (d. 1992), Reese attended Court Road and Ninian Park schools. A brother, Tony, followed.

Aged 11, Rees began attending Grange Council School for Girls.

== Other television appearances ==
After her notoriety, Rees presented the short-lived Really Useful Show, in which she learned car maintenance. She also appeared as herself in the sitcom Barbara, as well as travelling to the U.S. to be interviewed on The Tonight Show with Jay Leno. In 2001, she appeared as a chapel woman in the coming-of-age film Very Annie Mary, which was set in Wales. She appeared in an episode of the British radio show Confessions, hosted by Simon Mayo.

In 2004, Rees appeared in the Channel 5 series Back to Reality, a show featuring former stars of reality TV. She reached the final day, finishing as runner-up to Princess Diana's former lover James Hewitt.

== Music single ==
Following her brief stint with fame, Rees released a single: a cover of Madness' "Driving in My Car". It reached #49 in the UK Singles Chart; the music video featured Rees driving Betsy, her powder-blue 1990 Lada Riva estate (although it was filmed sitting on a flatbed trailer to give the illusion that she was driving alone) and fronted a government awareness campaign to increase road awareness.

== Personal life ==
Rees married David on 5 June 1965 at St Dyfrig and St Sampson's Church in Grangetown, Cardiff. The newlywed couple lived with Maureen's parents for two years, to save money for their own house. Maureen worked with her mother as a cleaner at the precision engineering firm Alfred Cook.

David also featured in Driving School, balancing his role at the local bus garage (where his father-in-law formerly worked) with giving his wife occasional driving lessons, in their Lada, which mostly did not go well. Examples include Rees' moving into the overtaking lane of a dual carriageway into the path of a car already in the lane, and accidentally running over her husband's foot. The couple have three children: Mandy, Hayley and Leighton. A local garage gave Rees an R-registration alpine green Lada Samara, which she named Rocky, for passing her manual driving test.

Rees was the subject of an episode of This is Your Life after her appearance in Driving School.

In 2001, Rees underwent hip-replacement surgery, which kept her off the road for seven months. She took refresher driving lessons again because she had "gone rusty".

Rees is a cancer survivor; she decided to learn to drive after overcoming cancer of the womb, which was discovered in 1987. She also needed a car because she decided to start her own cleaning company.
