= Big Brother Panto =

- Presented by: Jeff Brazier
- No. of days: 11
- No. of housemates: 10
- No. of episodes: 12

Release
- Original network: Channel 4; E4
- Original release: 20 December 2004 – 5 January 2005

Big Brother Panto is a special series of Big Brother that brought together ten housemates from previous Big Brothers to produce the pantomime Cinderella. It aired from 20 December 2004 to 5 January 2005 on the Channel 4 network.

The pantomime performed, Cinderella, was written by Jonathan Harvey, who wrote the sitcom Gimme Gimme Gimme.

== Housemates ==
Ten former Big Brother housemates took part. From Big Brother 1 were Melanie Hill and Nick Bateman, from series two was Narinder Kaur, from Big Brother 3 was Jade Goody, Spencer Smith and Tim Culley, from the fourth series was Anouska Golebiewski and the fifth series' was represented by Kitten Pinder, Marco Sabba and Victor Ebuwa. The housemates were paid for appearing.

In addition to the housemates, there were coach and staff to train them for the pantomime. The director was Chris Denys, the dance coach was Louie Spence and the dame coach was Dave Lynn. The stage manager was Ruth and the voice coaches were Mike and Nick.

Name	Previous status		Role auditioned	Role received?	
Name	Series	Result	Role auditioned	Role received?	
Anouska Golebiewski	Big Brother 4	Evicted	Cinderella	No	Rat
Jade Goody	Big Brother 3	Fourth Place	Cinderella	Yes	Cinderella
Kathryn "Kitten" Pinder	Big Brother 5	Ejected	Prince Charming	No	Dandini
Marco Sabba	Big Brother 5	Evicted	Jodey	No	Fairy Liquid
Melanie Hill	Big Brother 1	Evicted	Dandini	No	Prince Charming
Narinder Kaur	Big Brother 2	Evicted	Fairy Liquid	No	Baroness Hardup
Nicholas "Nick" Bateman	Big Brother 1	Ejected	Baron Hardup	Yes	Baron Hardup
Spencer Smith	Big Brother 3	Evicted	Jordanne	Yes	Jordanne
Tim Culley	Big Brother 3	Evicted	Jodey	Yes	Jodey
Victor Ebuwa	Big Brother 5	Evicted	Buttons	Yes	Buttons

== Daily summary ==
Day 1	Date	20 December 2004
Day 1	Events	Having entered The Lodge the day before, the housemates talk about what roles they want to play.
Day 2	Date	21 December 2004
Day 2	Events	The housemates had to audition for a part in Cinderella. Jade and Anouska auditioned for Cinderella, Victor for Button, Mel for Dandini, Nick for Baron Hardup, Spencer for ugly sister Jordanne, Tim and Marco for ugly sister Jodey, Narinder for the Fairy Liquid and Kitten for Prince Charming. No one auditioned for the parts of Baroness Hardup and the Fairy Hairdresser. Later they had a dance class with the dance coach. Later the director announced who had been cast in which part. Victor was cast as Buttons, Kitten as Dandini, Nick as Baron Hardup, Narinder as Baroness Hardup, Spencer as Jordanne, Tim as Jodey, Marco as the Fairy Liquid and Mel as Prince Charming. The director could not decide between Jade and Anouska for the role of Cinderella.
Day 3	Date	22 December 2004
Day 3	Events	During a dance class, Kitten walked out and threatened to leave because she did not want to play Dandini.
Day 4	Date	23 December 2004
Day 4	Events	The housemates had a lesson from "dame coach" Dave Lynn and later had the first script read through with Chris and Ruth. After a Christmas dinner the housemates left The Lodge.
Day 5	Date	27 December 2004
Day 5	Events	The housemates returned to The Lodge two by two on sleighs down the chimney. It was announced that the decision over who played Cinderella would be put to the public vote.
Day 6	Date	28 December 2004
Day 6	Events	The housemates appeared live on T4 and Jade and Anouska auditioned for the role of Cinderella. The lines for who played Cinderella were then open from 11.30am to 6pm. Jade won the public vote with 83% of the vote. Having previously complained about the script, Narinder talked with the writer Jonathan Harvey in the Great Hall.
Day 7	Date	29 December 2004
Day 7	Events	The housemates spent the day rehearsing.
Day 8	Date	30 December 2004
Day 8	Events	The housemates left The Lodge to go home for the New Year.
Day 9	Date	3 January 2005
Day 9	Events	The housemates returned to The Lodge. Later the housemates ran through Cinderella in full costume and had a singing lesson.
Day 10	Date	4 January 2005
Day 10	Events	During a full day of rehearsals, Kitten walked out of rehearsals and threatened to leave. However, she later returned.
Day 11	Date	5 January 2005
Day 11	Events	The housemates spent the day rehearsing. At 9pm, they performed Cinderella live on E4 and later left the house.

== Production ==
=== Broadcast ===
Big Brother Panto aired from 20 December 2004 to 5 January 2005 and was presented by Jeff Brazier. It was broadcast each night on E4 at 10pm and repeated the following morning during the T4 slot on Channel 4. On 28 December, there was a live show on E4 at 11am where comments and suggestions from the public were read to the housemates. The finale aired at 9pm on E4.

The housemates went home twice, firstly from 23 to 27 December and secondly from 30 December to 3 January to spend Christmas and New Year at home. Unlike all other Big Brother series, there were no evictions and no winner. The only public vote was for who played Cinderella.

On 27 December, Channel 4 accidentally broadcast the first half of the late-night E4 show, containing adult language and content, pre-watershed on T4. They later apologised.

=== House ===
The housemates spent the duration of the series in "The Lodge". There was a kitchen, bedroom, diary room, and a great hall. The Lodge was located in Bristol Studios.

== See also ==
- Big Brother: Reindeer Games - A Christmas-themed spin-off of Big Brother USA, in which former contestants reunite to compete in Christmas challenges.
