= The Big Call =

2005 British quiz show

- Created by: Kevin Ball and Mast Media
- Presented by: Neil Fox
- No. of series: 1
- No. of episodes: 6

Production
- Running time: 60 minutes
- Production company: Granada Productions

Original release
- Network: ITV
- Release: 18 June – 30 July 2005

The Big Call is an ITV quiz show created by Kevin Ball and Mast Media. It was made by Granada Productions and presented by Neil Fox with support from Big Call Professor Geoffrey Grimmett and announcer Peter Dickson. Six members of the public challenged it out, with the help of the celebrity of their choice.

The winner went on to the Pressure Point to decide between a guaranteed cash prize of £20,000 or 100,000 Lottery tickets chosen at different risk levels by the Big Call Professor. If the contestant chose the £20,000 cash prize, a phone-in viewer had the opportunity to win the 100,000 Lottery tickets.

In the final episode of the series, the studio contestant turned down the Lottery tickets and chose the £20,000 cash prize. The phone-in viewer who won the tickets received £172,000, as one of the tickets contained 5 numbers plus the bonus ball.

== Episodes ==
- 25 June 2005 episode; Studio contestant – £20,000 guaranteed cash prize. Phone contestant – No lottery prize. Carol Decker answering the questions.
- 23 July 2005 episode; Studio contestant – £20,000 guaranteed cash prize. Phone contestant – £46,000 lottery prize. Edwina Currie answering the questions.
- 30 July 2005 episode; Studio contestant – £20,000 guaranteed cash prize. Phone contestant – £172,000 lottery prize.

== Celebrity contestants ==
Celebrities that took part in the series included:

- Lizzy Bardsley
- Tony Blackburn
- Jennie Bond
- Anne Charleston
- Annabel Croft
- Jon Culshaw
- Edwina Currie
- Carol Decker
- Jenni Falconer
- Michael Fish
- Kenzie
- Judith Keppel
- Jayne Middlemiss
- Martin Offiah
- Antonia Okonma
- Ben Price
- Anneka Rice
