= Lizzy Bardsley =

British television personality (born c. 1973)

- Born: Elizabeth Bardsley c. 1973; Milnrow, Lancashire, England
- Occupations: Reality TV Star, Media Personality
- Years active: 2003-2007
- Spouse: Mark Bardsley
- Children: 8

Elizabeth Bardsley is an English television personality who rose to fame after appearing in the Channel 4 series Wife Swap in 2003. After her appearance, Bardsley also made a television appearance as a member of Celebrity Fit Club, during the show's third series. In 2005, she was convicted of 10 counts of child cruelty and sentenced to a 2 year suspended sentence.

== Media appearances ==
Mark and Lizzy Bardsley appeared in an episode of the second series of the Channel 4 programme Wife Swap, which was aired on 7 October 2003. Lizzy and her husband Mark caused controversy by being shown to be claiming £37,500 a year in benefits, while not working, and by frequent use of obscenities. She has 8 children.

Following her appearance on Wife Swap, Bardsley appeared with many other reality TV stars in Channel 5's Back to Reality. The following year, she took part in the third series of Celebrity Fit Club, and lost 1 stone 9 pounds.

== Legal issues ==
In November 2004, Bardsley was accused of failing to inform the Department for Work and Pensions that she had earned money from TV and media appearances and was accused of being overpaid £4879.87. She denied the allegations and claimed that all the money she earned had been given to various charities and her sister. On 27 September 2005, Bardsley was found guilty of benefit fraud and sentenced to 80 hours community service and ordered to pay £2400 costs. She was also told to pay back the money.

In March 2006, Bardsley was arrested on suspicion of child cruelty. On 3 April, she was charged with 10 counts of child cruelty relating to offences between 1996 and 2005. Bardsley was found guilty at Bolton Crown Court of four charges of child cruelty on 23 January 2007, and on 23 February was given an eight-month suspended sentence for two years at Manchester Crown Court.

== Filmography ==
Year	Title	Role	Notes
2003	Wife Swap	Self; contestant	1 episode
2004	Back to Reality	Self; contestant	10th place, 9 episodes
2004	The Weakest Link	Self; contestant	1 episode
2005	Britain's Favourite Celebrity Chav	Self	Documentary
2005	Celebrity Fit Club series 3	Self; contestant	3 episodes
2005	This Morning	Self; guest	1 episode
2005	The Friday Night Project	Self; guest	1 episode
2005	The Big Call	Self; contestant	1 episode
2005	Bed & Bardsleys	Self	4 episodes
2005	I'll Do Anything to Get on TV	Self	Documentary
