= Ciara Whelan =

Irish television presenter

Ciara Whelan is an Irish television presenter who is best known for fronting TV3's prime-time travel series The Holiday Show. She's also hosted Ireland: County by County.

== Background ==
She grew up in Kilkenny, attending St. John of God Girl's Primary School and later moving to Dublin where she was educated at St. Joseph of Cluny Secondary School, Killiney. She is the eldest of five with three sisters and one brother.

With a keen interest in the media from a young age, she went on to study at the Dublin Institute of Technology (D.I.T.) where she received her BSc. in Communications: Film and Broadcasting with French.

And so with degree under arm, her career in the media began among the teacups of the green room as a runner. She soon worked her way up the ladder, starting as a Content Editor for Raidió Teilifís Éireann (RTÉ) and then as a freelance Film & TV Producer.

In 2006, she began presenting with Channel 6, fronting their live-interactive quiz show, Quiz 6. Quiz 6 was broadcast live every day for three hours from Hilversum, just outside Amsterdam.

On returning home to Dublin, she began filming Game On, for Channel 6 and then Movies on the Box and Better Health for City Channel. Followed by Prodrift, the motor sports series that was broadcast on Setanta Sports, TV3, Motors TV, Men & Motors and SKY Sports.

In 2007, she travelled back and forth to the Middle East to present the corporate property series Riffa Views TV for the property development ‘Riffa Views’ in Bahrain.

2008 was to involve even more travel as she began shooting The Holiday Show for TV3, visiting countries such as Andorra, Portugal, Turkey and Morocco. The travel series began on TV3 on 30 January 2009 and was broadcast every Friday evening at 8.00pm. A second series of The Holiday Show was broadcast the following year, with her reporting from over 18 destinations worldwide including "specials" on both Thailand and Florida.

In 2021 and 2022 two seasons of the show Ireland County by County were released on the PBS-affiliated US television network Create, with Ciara presenting. In each episode Ciara explored a different county of Ireland.
