= Robert Jobson =

British journalist

- Born: 23 March 1964 (age 62)
- Occupation: journalist; author; broadcaster
- Period: 2002–present
- Subject: Royalty
- Notable works: Diana: Closely Guarded Secret; Our King: Charles III - The Man and the Monarch Revealed; Catherine, the Princess of Wales: The Biography
- Notable awards: London Press Club "Scoop of the Year" 2005; Freeman of the Worshipful Company of Stationers and Newspaper Makers, July 2024

Robert Jobson (born 23 March 1964) is a British journalist, author and broadcaster.

== Career ==
=== Journalism ===
Jobson, who has been royal editor of The Sun, Daily Express, News of the World and London Standard, is the royal editor for the Australian breakfast show Sunrise on Channel 7 as well as royal contributor for Good Morning America on US network ABC. He was "Royal Consultant" for Mark Schwahn's originally scripted series The Royals for E! starring British actresses Elizabeth Hurley and Dame Joan Collins and played cameo roles as himself in series 1, 2, 3 and 4.

A Freeman of the Worshipful Company of Stationers and Newspaper Makers, he was the recipient of the London Press Club Scoop of the Year award in 2005 for his world exclusive in the Evening Standard about the engagement of Prince Charles and Camilla Parker Bowles.

=== As an author ===
He has written several books on the British royal family, including the Number One Sunday Times bestseller and New York Times bestseller Catherine, the Princess of Wales: The Biography published in August 2024, and Our King: Charles III: The Man and The Monarch Revealed published April 2023. He also co-authored the 2002 international bestseller Diana: Closely Guarded Secret with Diana, Princess of Wales's Scotland Yard personal protection officer Inspector Ken Wharfe. He and Wharfe also wrote Guarding Diana (2017).

Among Jobson's other notable books are Charles at Seventy: Thoughts, Hopes and Dreams, The Royal Family Operations Manual, Prince Philip's Century 1921-2021: The Extraordinary Life of the Duke of Edinburgh, and William at 40: The Making of a Modern Monarch. Jobson also co-wrote Bulletproof, the life story of Royal Marines Commando and George Cross recipient Matthew Croucher.

== Bibliography ==
- Matt Croucher GC and Robert Jobson, Bulletproof, Arrow, 10 June 2010. ISBN 9780099543084
- Robert Jobson, The Future Royal Family: William, Kate and the modern royals. John Blake, London, 25 June 2014. ISBN 9781784186760.
- Robert Jobson and Ken Wharfe, Diana: Closely Guarded Secret John Blake, London, 17 August 2016. ISBN 9781786061133
- Robert Jobson and Ken Wharfe, Guarding Diana: Protecting the Princess Around the World John Blake, London. 10 August 2017. ISBN 9781786063885
- Robert Jobson, Charles at Seventy: Thoughts, Hopes and Dreams John Blake, London, 1 November 2018. ISBN 9781786068873
- Robert Jobson, The Royal Family Operations Manual, Haynes Publishing. 1 April 2020. ISBN 9781785216657
- Robert Jobson, Prince Philip's Century 1921-2021:The Extraordinary Life of the Duke of Edinburgh Ad Lib Publishers, 15 April 2021. ISBN 9781913543099
- Robert Jobson, William at 40: The Making of a Modern Monarch Ad Lib Publishers, 9 June 2022. ISBN 9781913543082
- Robert Jobson, Our King: Charles III - The Man and the Monarch Revealed, John Blake, 13 April 2023. ISBN 9781789467062
- Robert Jobson, Catherine, the Princess of Wales: The Biography, Kings Road Publishing, 1 August 2024. ISBN 9781789466638
- Robert Jobson, The Windsor Legacy: A Royal Dynasty of Secrets, Scandal and Survival, Bonnier Books UK, 6 November 2025. ISBN 9781789468922
