= The Holiday Show =

- Genre: Travel
- Presented by: Ciara Whelan, Jon Slattery
- Opening theme: The Sweet Escape
- Country of origin: Ireland
- Original language: English
- No. of seasons: 1
- No. of episodes: 6

Production
- Camera setup: Multi-camera
- Running time: 30 minutes

Original release
- Network: TV3
- Release: 4 January – 8 February 2013

The Holiday Show is an Irish travel show that first aired on TV3 in Ireland on 4 January 2013. The show sees presenters Ciara Whelan and Jon Slattery travelling to various locations throughout Ireland exploring the depths of Ireland's hidden holiday destinations. The last episode featuring Northern Ireland was shown on 8 February 2013.

== Destinations ==
- County Cork
- County Kerry
- County Mayo
- County Wexford
- Northern Ireland
