= Driving School =

British TV docusoap

- Genre: Reality television
- Directed by: Francesca Joseph
- Narrated by: Quentin Willson
- Composer: Glenn Keiles
- Country of origin: United Kingdom
- Original language: English
- No. of series: 1 (plus Celebrity Driving School)

Original release
- Network: BBC1
- Release: 1997

Driving School is a docusoap and fly on the wall documentary that was broadcast on BBC1 in the summer of 1997, which followed a group of learner drivers around Bristol and South Wales. The series was made on a reduced budget but shown in primetime, it created one of the first reality TV stars in Maureen Rees.

The series was created and directed by the British film and documentary maker Francesca Joseph and was narrated by Quentin Willson, who would later present the similar Britain's Worst Driver.

In October 2022, all six episodes of the original series were made available on BBC iPlayer.

== Participants ==
=== Others ===
Teenager Danny wanted to pass his test so he could visit his girlfriend in Preston. Although he passed first time, he had already broken up with Jill.

An older lady called Joan passed her test at the beginning of the series (even though it took her a while to realise that she needed to put the car in Drive before the car would move), but had "lost her nerve" and needed lessons to rebuild her confidence.

The main instructors were Pamela Carr from Streetwise Driving School and independent Paul Farrall. The Andy1st driving school was also featured.

== Celebrity Driving School ==
A four-part celebrity version was produced in 2003 in aid of Comic Relief. Celebrities taking part consisted of Gareth Gates, Paul O'Grady, Nadia Sawalha, Natalie Cassidy, Simon Day and Jade Goody. They found out live during the Red Nose Day telethon on 14 March if they had passed. None of them had. Mel Giedroyc was the narrator.

== Scarlett's Driving School ==
In February 2023, BBC One started broadcasting a new version of the format called Scarlett's Driving School, this time featuring Gogglebox star Scarlett Moffatt and set around Teesside. The Telegraph reviewed the new programme and gave it a score of two stars out of five, with the headline reading "Bring back Maureen! Scarlett Moffatt's Driving School fails to get into gear".

== Transmission guide ==
- Series 1: 6 editions: 10 June 1997 – 15 July 1997
- Special – The Making of Maureen: 29 March 1998
- Celebrity Driving School – 4 editions: 24 February 2003 – 7 March 2003
