= James Hewitt =

Retired British Army officer

- Born: James Lifford Hewitt; 30 April 1958 (age 68); Derry, Northern Ireland, United Kingdom
- Education: Norwood Preparatory School, Exeter; Millfield School
- Alma mater: Royal Military Academy Sandhurst
- Military career
- Allegiance: United Kingdom
- Branch: British Army
- Service years: 1978–1994
- Rank: Captain
- Unit: Life Guards

James Lifford Hewitt (born 30 April 1958) is a retired cavalry officer in the British Army. He came to public attention in the mid-1990s after he disclosed an affair with Diana, Princess of Wales, while she was still married to then-Prince Charles.

== Early life ==
Hewitt was born in Derry, Northern Ireland, where his father, 1952 Olympic pentathlete John Hewitt, was stationed with the Royal Marines. He grew up in Kent and Devon. His mother, Shirley Stamp, was daughter of a London dental surgeon who lived in Devon. Hewitt was educated at Norwood Preparatory School in Exeter before going to Millfield, a public school, in Street, Somerset.

== Career ==
=== Military ===
After graduating from the Royal Military Academy Sandhurst, Hewitt was commissioned into the Life Guards, British Army, on 8 April 1978 as a second lieutenant. He was promoted to lieutenant on 8 April 1980. He transferred from a short service commission to a special regular commission on 1 October 1981. He was promoted to acting captain on 8 October 1984. On 21 October 1985, he transferred from a special regular commission to a regular commission. In 1991, he served as a Challenger tank squadron commander in the Gulf War. He was mentioned in despatches "in recognition of service during the operation in the Gulf" in June 1991. He failed the exam for promotion to major three times.

On 1 March 1994, he was retired from the British Army after 17 years of military service. The BBC reported in 2003 that in retirement, Hewitt was granted the rank of major which was "in line with common army practice".

=== Business and media career ===
Hewitt opened a golf driving range in 1994.

He won the Channel 5 reality show Back to Reality in 2004; in 2006, Hewitt appeared as a contestant in The X Factor: Battle of the Stars, the celebrity version of The X Factor. He also appeared in the first episode of the UK Top Gear in Series 8 in May of the same year to participate with other celebrities in setting power lap times around the Top Gear Test Track in the show's newest "reasonably priced car": when the presenters seemingly did not recognise him upon his arrival, they were apparently too embarrassed to admit as much, and rather than ask him his name, they listed his lap time as "Well Spoken Man".

In 2009, Hewitt opened a bar called the Polo House in the fashionable Golden Mile of Marbella, Spain. It closed in 2013.

Hewitt was portrayed by Daniel Donskoy in season four of The Crown, and by Gareth Keegan in the musical Diana.

== Personal life ==
=== Affair with the Princess of Wales ===
Hewitt's affair with the princess began while he was still in the Household Cavalry and had been asked to give her riding lessons. News of the relationship leaked quickly and within months British newspapers published accounts of the romance, first hinted at in Nigel Dempster's Daily Mail Diary and then with a full story in the News of the World. Some years later, after he had left the army, Anna Pasternak published the book Princess in Love in 1994, for which Hewitt was a major source, and it alleged that he had a five-year affair with Diana, Princess of Wales from 1986 to 1991. Diana confirmed the affair in her 1995 Panorama interview. The following year, the film Princess in Love by David Greene was released, based on the book, with Julie Cox and Christopher Villiers playing the lead roles.

Hewitt considered suicide after the affair ended. He was preparing for a trip to France, and he wanted to shoot himself. He said, "I got in my car and loaded a few things up to get on the ferry to go to France – to shoot myself .... And then my mother insisted on coming with me. And, if she hadn't, I would have probably shot myself. So I owe her my life really."

In 2003, Hewitt tried to sell his 64 personal letters from Diana for £10 million. The act of selling the letters was considered to be a betrayal of trust, and Sarah, Duchess of York (who was also divorced from a British prince in Charles's brother, the former Prince Andrew), condemned his action. She was reported to have said, "Betrayal, I think, is the most horrible, horrible, disloyal thing you can do to anyone."

Persistent suggestions have been made in the media that Hewitt, and not Charles, is the biological father of Diana's second son, Prince Harry, Duke of Sussex (born 1984). Hewitt stated to the press in 2002 and 2017 that Harry had already been born by the time of the affair, a statement also made by Diana's royal protection officer, Inspector Ken Wharfe. Wharfe reiterated this in an interview in 2016, and in his memoir Diana: Closely Guarded Secret published in 2002 (and reissued in 2017) in which he says "A simple comparison of dates proves it is impossible for Hewitt to be Harry's father. ... Harry was born on September 15, 1984, which means he was conceived around Christmas 1983, when his brother, William, was 18 months old. Diana did not meet James Hewitt until the summer of 1986."

Diana attributed Harry's red hair colouration to her side of the family, calling him her "little Spencer".

=== Legal and medical issues ===
In July 2004, Hewitt was arrested outside a restaurant in Fulham with Alison Bell, a CNN journalist, for the possession of cocaine. A drunken Hewitt had 0.36 grams (0.013 oz) of cocaine in his pocket. He was given a warning, and Bell was released without charge. As a result, he was refused reinstatement of his firearms licences because of his "intemperate habits" after police found a disassembled 16-bore shotgun on his living room floor.

On 14 May 2017, it was reported that Hewitt had suffered from both a heart attack and stroke, leaving him fighting for his life in hospital. However, by the end of June 2017, Hewitt had been released from hospital and was said to be recovering well at home; in 2021, he was reportedly working as a gardener.
