= Mission Beach USA =

- Presented by: Anna Nolan
- Country of origin: Ireland
- Original language: English
- No. of series: 2

Production
- Running time: 26 mins

Original release
- Network: RTÉ Two / TRTÉ
- Release: 25 October 2010 – 16 December 2011

Mission Beach USA is a reality television series produced for RTÉ Television by Rival Media for RTÉ's youth strand TRTÉ which aired on RTÉ Two. Rival Media had previously produced a series of the same name, for the BBC Switch format, which aired in 2008.

In the RTÉ series, eight Irish teens, reportedly selected from several thousand appliants, head for Fort Lauderdale in the United States to train as lifeguards. Over the course of 3 weeks they join a group of other teens who are training at the Fort Lauderdale Junior Lifeguard Programme.

A second series was commissioned by RTÉ and was scheduled to film, with 8 new participants, in Fort Lauderdale during mid-2011. Series two was broadcast on RTÉ 2 later in 2011.
