= Show Me the Money (British game show) =

- Genre: Game show
- Country of origin: United Kingdom
- Original language: English
- No. of series: 2
- No. of episodes: 115

Production
- Running time: 30 minutes

Original release
- Network: Channel 4
- Release: 6 September 1999 – 17 November 2000

Show Me the Money is a live afternoon game show presented by Louise Noel (with the exception of three shows presented by Alice Beer when Louise was ill) which aired on Channel 4 in the UK and ran for two seasons from Monday to Friday between 6 September 1999 and 17 November 2000. It was produced by Princess Productions for Channel 4.

The show won the Royal Television Society award for 1999 in the Features – Daytime category.

== Synopsis ==
The premise of the game was for teams to make as much money as possible from an imaginary £100,000 on the Stock Market by the end of the season. There were five active teams at any point, each having a day of the week to show their imaginary portfolios and state what they were buying and selling. If a team ever had below £90,000 in their imaginary pot at the beginning of their show they were kicked off and a new team brought in to replace them.

Each team consisted of three members of the public with little or no knowledge of the Stock Exchange. Tom Winnifrith, a professional investor, was on hand to give the teams advise with their portfolio. Prior to deciding on what they would buy or sell a Managing Director of a business listed on the Stock Exchange would come on and give a 60-second pitch to the team.

In addition to the three teams, there was an extra team called "the baby boomers" which were three babies that were given some random letter blocks which, when picked, triggered a buy of that stock and this introducing a random element to the game.

There was an online game section open to the public during the show which had a £10,000 prize each day.

== Format ==
The show contained many graphical representations of the Stock Exchange presented in real time. Often, a team's stock rose or fell during the course of the show. Tom Winnifrith would give out facts and trivia at an easily understood level. Louise Noel would have informal chats to the teams and the Managing Director guests.

== Series Guide ==
Series	Start date	End date	Episodes
1	6 September 1999	3 December 1999	65
2	11 September 2000	17 November 2000	50
