= Diana: Closely Guarded Secret =

2002 book on Diana, Princess of Wales

- Author: Ken Wharfe; Robert Jobson
- Language: English
- Subject: Diana, Princess of Wales
- Published: London
- Publisher: Michael O'Mara Books
- Publication date: 2002
- ISBN: 9781843170051
- Dewey Decimal: 941.085092

Diana: Closely Guarded Secret is a 2002 book by former Metropolitan Police Royalty Protection Branch officer Ken Wharfe, written with the assistance of author Robert Jobson.

The book was the first written by a former member of the Royalty Protection Branch and was subject to some criticism and controversy. A revised and updated edition was published ahead of the 20th anniversary of the death of Diana, Princess of Wales.

== Background and synopsis ==
Wharfe, who was the Close protection officer for Diana for more than six years, has claimed that Diana: Closely Guarded Secret was "redressing the balance", in response to criticism of Diana since her death. The book contains numerous revelations concerning Diana's personal life, including intimate details about her relationship with Oliver Hoare, a married man, with whom Wharfe claims she fell "completely in love". It recounts several other incidents, such as her disappearance during a 1992 cruise in the Mediterranean - a last-ditch attempt to save her marriage - when she suspected Charles, Prince of Wales had been engaging in lengthy telephone calls to Camilla Parker Bowles during the cruise. After fears Diana had jumped overboard, Wharfe wrote he eventually discovered her crouching beneath the canvas cover of a lifeboat, sobbing.

== Reception ==
Despite his book becoming a bestseller in several countries, Wharfe was accused of "betrayal" and criticised for alleged inaccuracies and embellishments. Sir John Stevens, then Commissioner of the Metropolitan Police, responded that "We are appalled by the revelations of this former protection officer. It would appear that he has breached the unwritten code of confidence between police officers and the people that they protect." Several former colleagues of Wharfe disputed the accuracy of certain passages in the book.
