= Irish Film and Television Network =

Irish company

The Irish Film and Television Network is a company that provides news and a directory service of information related to the Irish film industry. It was founded in 1995.
