= Nick Bateman (television personality) =

British media personality

- Born: Nicholas Bateman; 5 November 1967 (age 58); Kent, England
- Other name: Nasty Nick
- Occupations: Reality TV star, media personality, radio presenter
- Years active: 2000–Present
- Television: Big Brother UK

Nicholas Bateman (born 5 November 1967), better known as Nasty Nick, is a British reality television star, media personality and radio presenter. He is best known for his controversial appearance on the first series of Big Brother UK.

== Early life ==
Bateman grew up in Kent, he worked in the City of London as a broker before taking part in Big Brother.

== Big Brother ==
In 2000, Bateman entered the first series of Big Brother UK. He was one of 40,000 people that applied to take part in the show. During his time in the Big Brother house, he did not receive a single nomination, however, he was dubbed "Nasty Nick" by tabloids due to his duplicitous nature, playing the other housemates off against one another. On Day 34, he was exposed by his fellow housemates after Big Brother uncovered his attempts to manipulate fellow housemates nominations in the weekly eviction process, which is a violation of Big Brother's rules. He was removed from the Big Brother house following the rule break and replaced by Claire Strutton. Bateman's removal garnered media and press attention, with him being interviewed on multiple television shows. He was also involved in a separate controversy during his time on the show when he was accused of smuggling a mobile phone in to the house to receive information from the outside world; the Big Brother production team then thoroughly searched the house and Bateman's belongings and no mobile phone was found. On Day 24 a helicopter was flown over the Big Brother house and dropped approximately forty leaflets in to the garden, requesting that Bateman was nominated for eviction; the leaflets were removed before housemates discovered them.

In 2010, Bateman returned to compete in Ultimate Big Brother, the final series of Big Brother on Channel 4, where he finished in fifth place. During the series, he was nominated for eviction twice, and formed a friendship with Victor Ebuwa.

== Other work ==
After his departure from the Big Brother house, Bateman went on to present the short-lived television series Trust Me. He featured on multiple game shows including; Come Dine with Me, Night Fever, Show Me the Money and The Weakest Link. He featured in the British reality television series Back to Reality where he was the first evicted, and Big Brother spin-off Big Brother Panto. He later featured as the narrator in a stage production of The Rocky Horror Show. In 2005, he had a minor role in the British film; Hell to Pay. In 2011, he began appearing on Big Brother after show Big Brother's Bit on the Side for Channel 5.

Bateman also presented a weekly radio show on 107.8 Academy FM in Kent.

== Personal life ==
In 2013, Bateman moved to Sydney, Australia.

== Filmography ==
Film and television
Year	Title	Role	Notes
2000	Big Brother UK series 1	Self; housemate	11th place (Disqualified), 27 episodes
2000	The Late Late Show	Self; guest	1 episode
2000	The Priory	Self; guest	1 episode
2000	Kelly	Self; guest	1 episode
2000	Live & Kicking	Self; guest	1 episode
2000	Panorama	Self; guest	1 episode
2000	Show Me The Money	Self; contestant	1 episode
2000	TFI Friday	Self; co-host	1 episode
2000	Trust Me	Self; presenter	
2000	Night Fever	Self; contestant	1 episode
2000	Live Talk	Self; guest	1 episode
2000	This Morning	Self; guest	2 episodes
2001	Liquid News	Self; guest	1 episode
2001	The Weakest Link	Self; contestant	1 episode
2001	Top Ten	Self; guest	1 episode
2001	Time Team	Self; project manager	1 episode
2001	Loose Women	Self; guest	1 episode
2001	RI:SE	Self; guest	1 episode
2001	The Wright Stuff	Self; guest	3 episodes
2003	The Video Tape	Shopper	Short film
2004	Back to Reality	Self; contestant	12th place, 8 episodes
2004	GMTV	Self; guest	3 episodes
2004	Dick and Dom in da' Bungalow	Self; cameo	1 episode
2004	Hell's Kitchen	Self; customer	1 episode
2004	Celebrity Poker Club	Self; guest	1 episode
2004	This Week	Self; guest	1 episode
2004	Big Brother Panto	Self; cast member	11 episodes
2005	Hell to Pay	Police officer	
2005	8 out of 10 Cats	Self; guest	1 episode
2005	Heads up with Richard Herring	Self; guest	1 episode
2008	The Culture Show	Self; guest	1 episode
2008	Big Brother's Little Brother	Self; ex-housemate	3 episodes
2009	Big Brother A Decade in the Headlines	Self; feature	Documentary
2010	Ultimate Big Brother	Self; housemate	5th place, 22 episodes
2011	Come Dine with Me	Self; contestant	5 episodes
2011	Big Brother's Bit on the Side	Self; ex-housemate	3 episodes
2012	Britain's Got More Talent	Royal Guard	1 episode
2012	The Bridges That London Built	Self; archaeologist	Documentary
2012	The Big Fat Quiz of the 2000s	Self; contestant	TV special
2020	Celebrity: A 21st Century Story	Self; feature	Documentary
