= Tom Winnifrith =

British journalist, share tipster and fund manager

Thomas John Zacchaeus Winnifrith (born January 1968) is a former British journalist, share tipster and former fund manager.

== Early life ==
Winnifrith was born on 5th April 1968, son of Oxford-educated University of Warwick classics lecturer Dr Thomas John Winnifrith (1938-2020) and Joanna, daughter of John Mackarness Booker, headmaster of Knighton House Girls' School (now part of Bryanston School); his maternal uncle was the journalist and author Christopher Booker. His mother committed suicide in 1976. His paternal grandfather, Sir John Winnifrith (brother to actress Anna Lee), was a senior civil servant in the Ministry of Agriculture and Fisheries. He studied PPE at Christ Church, Oxford (1987–90), graduating with a lower second degree.

== Career ==
=== Financial journalism ===
He has formerly worked as a financial journalist for Investors Chronicle and the London Evening Standard. Winnifrith was the resident investment expert on the Channel 4 game show Show Me The Money.

=== Rivington Street Holdings and T1PS ===
Winnifrith founded the financial commentary website t1ps.com and was chief executive of Rivington Street Holdings (RSH), a financial services group active in investment management, stockbroking, corporate finance and financial publishing.

In September 2011, Winnifrith stepped down as group chief executive to become Director of Strategy. He remained on the group's board and retained responsibility for T1PS Investment Management and Rivington Street Ventures.

In May 2012, following a strategic review led by Rivington chairman Jim Mellon, Winnifrith left the group. The company scaled back its fund-management operations following deteriorating performance and profitability. Webb Capital, led by Peter Webb, replaced T1PS Investment Management as manager of the T1PS Smaller Companies Growth and T1PS Smaller Companies Gold funds.

According to Citywire, the two funds recorded losses of approximately 45% and 44%, respectively, over the year to March 2012. Winnifrith continued to provide consultancy services to the t1ps.com investment website after leaving Rivington.

=== Corporate directorships and Peterhouse Capital ===
Winnifrith served two separate periods as a director of the company now known as Peterhouse Capital Limited (company number 02075091). His first appointment was from 3 July 2007 to 31 January 2008, when the company was known as Lion Capital Corporation Limited. He was subsequently reappointed on 19 December 2008, after the company had been renamed Rivington Street Corporate Finance Limited, and resigned on 6 April 2009.

Rivington Street Corporate Finance Limited would later be renamed to Peterhouse Corporate Finance Limited in July 2012 and, following further name changes, Peterhouse Capital Limited in April 2018. The company retained registration number 02075091 throughout.

=== Athol Gold and Value ===
Winnifrith served as Chief Investment Officer of Athol Gold and Value Limited, an investment company specializing in natural resources. In November 2011, investment-management responsibility was formally transferred to T1PS Investment Management (Isle of Man) Limited, with Winnifrith leading the team.

In April 2012, Winnifrith became Athol's directly contracted Chief Operating Officer. He resigned on 29 June 2012. Athol's audited financial statements for the year ended 31 December 2011 reported a loss of £2.168 million, compared with a profit of £1.063 million in 2010. The 2011 result included a £1.982 million reduction in the fair value of investments, compared with a £1.525 million fair-value gain in the previous year.

=== ShareProphets ===
Winnifrith subsequently founded and became editor of ShareProphets, a financial commentary website.

== Controversy ==
Winnifrith was expelled from the Liberal Democrat Party by Paddy Ashdown in 1993 for allegedly "pandering to racism". He was subject to an investigation by Metropolitan Police Service at the request of the Attorney General at the time, Sir Nicholas Lyell, and then Shadow Cabinet Minister Jack Straw, which found no wrongdoing.

In September 2017, Winnifrith authored an article that claimed that the FCA would not be shutting down Beaufort Securities. In March 2018, Beaufort Securities was shut down, declared insolvent, and charged with fraud, following a joint FCA, FBI, SEC and DOJ investigation.

== Personal life ==
Tom is married to Ranji Devadason, sociology lecturer at Keele University.
