= Big Brother (British TV series) series 1 =

Season of the UK television series

Coordinates: 51°31′39″N 0°0′11″W

Big Brother
- Series 1
- Series one logo
- Presented by: Davina McCall
- No. of days: 64
- No. of housemates: 11
- Winner: Craig Phillips
- Runner-up: Anna Nolan
- No. of episodes: 52

Release
- Original network: Channel 4
- Original release: 18 July – 15 September 2000

Additional information
- Filming dates: 14 July – 15 September 2000

Series chronology
- Next → Series 2

Big Brother 2000, retrospectively known as Big Brother 1, is the first series of the British reality television series Big Brother. The show followed eleven contestants, known as housemates, who were isolated from the outside world for an extended period of time in a custom built house. Each week, one or more of the housemates were evicted by a public vote. The last remaining housemate, Craig Phillips, was declared the winner, winning a cash prize of £70,000.

This was the only series not to feature a companion show until the second series in 2001.

The series lasted 64 days and was presented by Davina McCall. It launched on Channel 4 on 18 July 2000 and ended on 15 September 2000. Ten housemates entered on the first day, with one additional housemate being introduced in the sixth week. The series was watched by an average of 4.5 million viewers. It became the subject of intense press attention throughout its broadcast, and gained particular notoriety after one housemate, Nick Bateman, was ejected from the House for breaking the rules.

== Format ==
"The show is all about human interactions. It's people who are, loving each other, hating each other. They fight, they cry, they laugh -- all emotions, we'll see in the house."

— Paul Romer, co-creator of the original show, on the social experiment aspect of the series.

Big Brother was a game show in which a group of contestants, referred to as housemates, lived in isolation from the outside world in a custom built "house", constantly under video surveillance. During their time in the house, the housemates were required to nominate two of their fellow contestants for potential eviction, and the two or more with the most votes would be nominated. This process was mandatory for all housemates, and failure to comply could result in ejection from the house. Despite this, should a housemate enter the house following the launch, they are immune from the first round of nominations they are present for. The public, through a vote conducted by phone, would vote to evict one of the nominated housemates from the house, and the housemate with the most votes from the viewers would be evicted from the house. When only three housemates remained, the public would vote for which of them should win the series, and the housemates with the most votes would become the winner. The housemates were competing for a £70,000 cash prize.

During their time in the house, housemates were given weekly tasks to perform. The housemates would wager a portion of their weekly shopping budget on the task, and would either win double their wagered fund or lose the wagered fund depending on their performance in the task. The housemates were required to work as a group to complete the task, with the format of the tasks varying based on the number of remaining housemates. Should the housemates run out of the food provided for them, an emergency ration was available to them. The housemates were forbidden from discussing nominations, and doing so could result in punishment. The format of the series was mainly seen as a social experiment, and required housemates to interact with others who may have differing ideals, beliefs, and prejudices. Housemates were also required to make visits to the Diary Room during their stay in the house, where they were able to share their thoughts and feelings on their fellow housemates and the game. While in the house, the housemates are free to leave at any time, however, will not be allowed to return to the house. Similarly, a housemate can be removed from the house by production should they repeatedly break the rules set for the housemates. Should a housemate choose to leave the house or be ejected, a replacement housemate will enter the house sometime after their departure. Upon entering the house, new housemates are exempt from the first round of nominations they are present for.

== Housemates ==
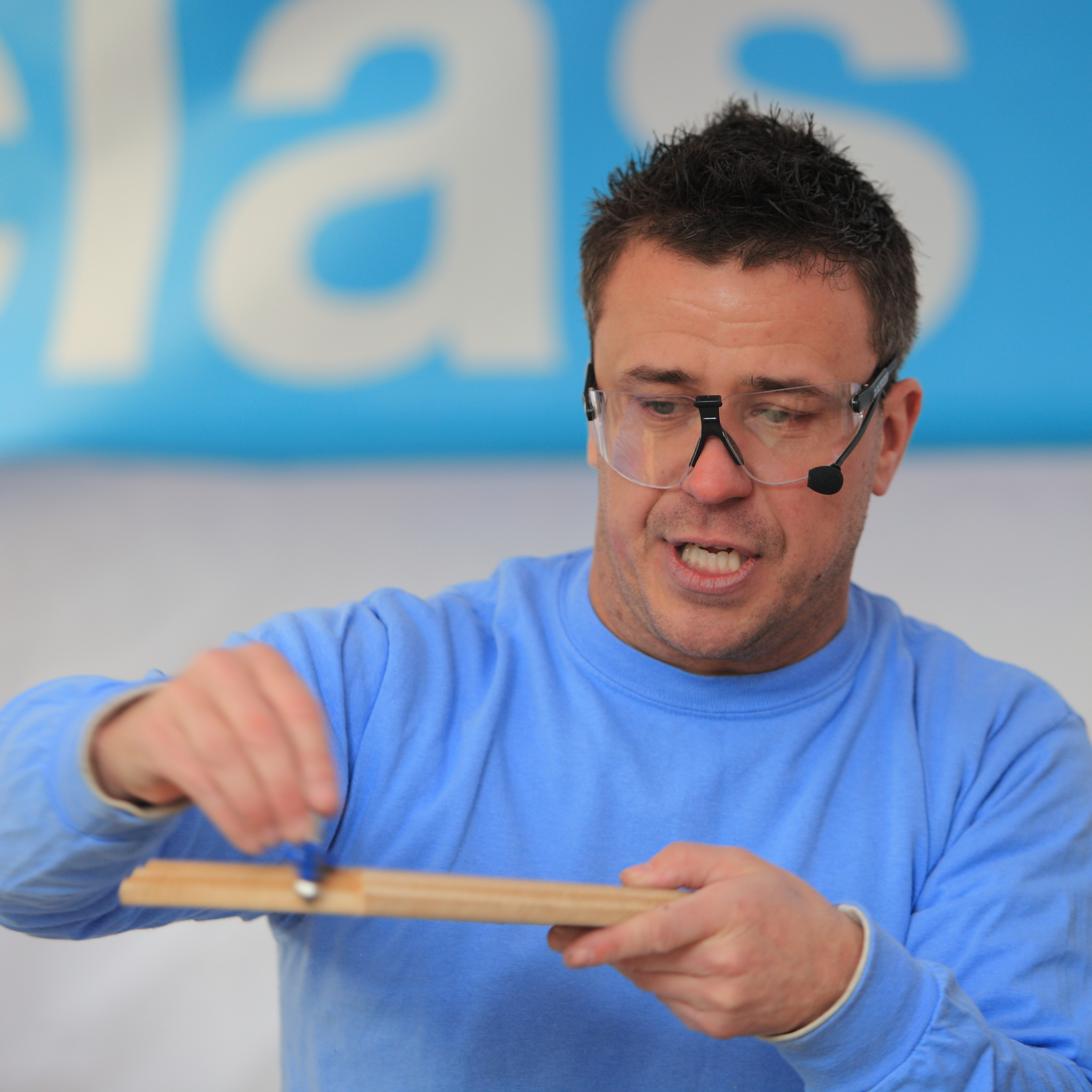
Craig Phillips

Name	Age on entry	Hometown	Day entered	Day exited	Result
Craig Phillips	28	Liverpool	1	64	Winner
Anna Nolan	29	Dublin	1	64	Runner-up
Darren Ramsay	23	Catford, London	1	64	3rd place
Melanie Hill	26	North London	1	57	Evicted
Claire Strutton	25	Gerrards Cross, Buckinghamshire	37	50	Evicted
Thomas "Tom" McDermott	31	Omagh, County Tyrone	1	43	Evicted
Nichola Holt	28	Bolton, Lancashire	1	36	Evicted
Nicholas "Nick" Bateman	32	Kent	1	35	Ejected
Caroline O'Shea	37	Birmingham	1	29	Evicted
Andrew Davidson	23	Hemel Hempstead	1	22	Evicted
Sada Walkington	28	Edinburgh/Wakefield	1	15	Evicted

== Nominations table ==
	Week 2	Week 3	Week 4	Week 5	Week 6	Week 7		Week 8	Week 9 Final		Nominations received
	Week 2	Week 3	Week 4	Week 5	Week 6	Round 1	Round 2	Week 8	Week 9 Final		Nominations received
Craig	Caroline, Sada	Caroline, Nichola	Caroline, Nichola	Nichola, Darren	Darren, Anna	~~Darren,~~; ~~Anna~~	Darren, Anna	Darren, Melanie	Winner (Day 64)		20
Anna	Andrew, Darren	Andrew, Tom	Craig, Tom	Craig, Tom	Craig, Tom	~~Claire,~~; ~~Craig~~	Claire, Craig	Craig, Darren	Runner-up (Day 64)		6
Darren	Sada, Caroline	Andrew, Melanie	Craig, Tom	Craig, Tom	Tom, Melanie	~~Melanie,~~; ~~Craig~~	Claire, Craig	Melanie, Anna	Third place (Day 64)		17
Melanie	Sada, Craig	Craig, Caroline	Caroline, Nichola	Nichola, Darren	Craig, Darren	~~Claire,~~; ~~Craig~~	Craig, Claire	Craig, Darren	Evicted (Day 57)		9
Claire	Not in House				Exempt	~~Darren,~~; ~~Melanie~~	Melanie, Darren	Evicted (Day 50)			5
Tom	Caroline, Sada	Darren, Caroline	Darren, Caroline	Anna, Nichola	Anna, Darren	Evicted (Day 43)					12
Nichola	Andrew, Tom	Andrew, Craig	Melanie, Tom	Craig, Tom	Evicted (Day 36)						9
Nick	Sada, Caroline	Caroline, Craig	Nichola, Caroline	Craig, Nichola	Ejected (Day 35)						0
Caroline	Darren, Andrew	Tom, Andrew	Tom, Melanie	Evicted (Day 29)							14
Andrew	Sada, Caroline	Caroline, Nichola	Evicted (Day 22)								8
Sada	Darren, Andrew	Evicted (Day 15)									6
Notes	none				1	2		none	3		
Against public vote	Caroline, Sada	Andrew, Caroline	Caroline, Tom	Craig, Nichola	Anna, Craig, Darren, Tom	Claire, Craig, Darren, Melanie	Claire, Craig	Craig, Darren, Melanie	Anna, Craig, Darren		
Ejected	none			Nick	none						
Evicted	Sada; 55% to evict	Andrew; 68% to evict	Caroline; 62% to evict	Nichola; 72% to evict	Tom; 30% to evict	None	Claire; 79% to evict	Melanie; 69% to evict	Darren; 13% (out of 3)	Anna; 49% (out of 2)	
Evicted	Sada; 55% to evict	Andrew; 68% to evict	Caroline; 62% to evict	Nichola; 72% to evict	Tom; 30% to evict	None	Claire; 79% to evict	Melanie; 69% to evict	Craig; 51% to win		

Notes

- ^Note 1: As a new Housemate, Claire could not nominate or be nominated in this week.
- ^Note 2: During Week 7's nominations held on Day 46, Darren's nominations for Melanie and Craig were overheard by the rest of the house. Big Brother decided to void all nominations and housemates had to nominate for a second time in which Darren changed his nominations. Had this not happened, Claire, Craig, Darren and Melanie would have faced the public vote.
- ^Note 3: There were no nominations in the final week. The public voted for who they wanted to win, rather than evict.

== Weekly summary ==
Week 1
Week 1	Entrances	On Day 1, Andrew, Anna, Caroline, Craig, Darren, Melanie, Nichola, Nick, Sada and Tom entered the house.
Week 1	Tasks	On Day 2, housemates were given their first weekly shopping task, which required them to make a clay bowl and mug using a potter's wheel. The housemates would fail the task if three or more objects cracked upon being fired. The housemates wagered 20% of their weekly shopping budget on the task. The housemates failed their shopping task.
Week 2
Week 2	Tasks	On Day 9, the housemates were given their second weekly shopping task, which required them to memorize ten facts about each housemate. The group was later quizzed about these facts later in the week. If the housemates as a group miss more than one question, their shopping budget will be decreased. The housemates wagered 40% of their weekly shopping budget on the task. The housemates passed their shopping task.
Week 2	Nominations	On Day 11, the housemates nominated for the first time. Caroline and Sada received the most nominations and faced the public vote.
Week 2	Exits	On Day 15, Sada was evicted from the house receiving 55% of the public vote to evict.
Week 3
Week 3	Tasks	On Day 16, the housemates were given their third weekly shopping task, in which they had to travel a total of 1,800 km on an exercise bike, thus theoretically traveling from Land's End to John O'Groats while passing through all of their hometowns. The housemates wagered 50% of their weekly shopping budget on the task. The housemates passed their shopping task.; On Day 19, the group had to write and perform a play. Their reward was the right to watch a film of their choice. They chose to watch Happy Gilmore.
Week 3	Nominations	On Day 18, the housemates nominated for the second time. Andrew and Caroline received the most nominations and faced the public vote.
Week 3	Exits	On Day 22, Andrew was evicted from the house receiving 68% of the public vote to evict.
Week 4
Week 4	Tasks	On Day 23, the housemates were given their fourth weekly shopping task, which required the housemates to learn the Semaphore signaling system. The housemates worked in pairs and attempted to both communicate and transcribe messages using the code. They wagered 35% of their weekly shopping budget on the task. The housemates failed their shopping task.; The same day, housemates were given a second task, in which they had to perform a good deed, which the housemates passed.
Week 4	Nominations	On Day 25, the housemates nominated for the third time. Caroline and Tom received the most nominations and faced the public vote.
Week 4	Exits	On Day 29, Caroline was evicted from the house receiving 62% of the public vote to evict.
Week 5
Week 5	Tasks	On Day 30, the housemates were given their fourth weekly shopping task, in which housemates were given an assault course and had to complete the course within eight minutes. They wagered 50% of their weekly shopping budget on the task. The housemates passed their shopping task.; On Day 31, housemates had to write poems about one another, and then guess who wrote which poem as well as whom they wrote about.; On Day 34, housemates were given the task of writing a song, with lyrics, and would perform it in 24 hours.
Week 5	Nominations	On Day 32, the housemates nominated for the fourth time. Craig and Nichola received the most nominations and faced the public vote.
Week 5	Exits	On Day 35, Nick was ejected from the house after he had attempted to influence nominations and was found with a pen and paper in his possessions.; On Day 36, Nichola was evicted from the house receiving 72% of the public vote to evict.
Week 6
Week 6	Entrances	On Day 37, Claire entered the house.
Week 6	Tasks	On Day 37, housemates were given their fifth weekly shopping task, in which they had to go outside and find the face of a housemate outside every time an alarm went off; the housemates would later have to remember the order in which the faces appeared. The housemates wagered 50% of their weekly shopping budget on the task. The housemates passed their shopping task.; On Day 41, the housemates were required to make outfits for their fellow housemates.
Week 6	Nominations	On Day 39, the housemates nominated for the fifth time. Anna, Craig, Darren and Tom received the most nominations and faced the public vote. Due to being a new housemate, Claire was exempt from the nomination process.
Week 6	Exits	On Day 43, Tom was evicted from the house receiving 30% of the public vote to evict.
Week 7
Week 7	Tasks	On Day 44, housemates were given their next weekly shopping task, which saw the housemates creating a life-sized sculpture of themselves with wire. Should the sculpture stand on its own for one consecutive minute, the housemates would pass the task. The housemates wagered 50% of their weekly shopping budget on the task. The housemates failed their shopping task.; On Day 44, housemates were given three different samples of wine. If they would figure out which one was the most expensive. they would be given five bottles of wine. The housemates passed this task and were gifted with five bottles of wine.
Week 7	Nominations	On Day 46, the housemates nominated for the sixth time. Claire, Craig, Darren and Melanie received the most nominations and faced the public vote. However, the housemates were given the opportunity to recast their nominations when it was revealed that the housemates heard Darren cast his nominations. Claire and Craig received the most nominations in the second round, which means they faced the public vote.
Week 7	Exits	On Day 50, Claire was evicted from the house receiving 79% of the public vote to evict.
Week 8
Week 8	Tasks	On Day 51, the housemates were given their seventh weekly shopping task, which saw them attempting to learn various circus skills which they would perform for "Big Brother" later in the week. The housemates wagered 20% of their weekly shopping budget on the task. The housemates failed their shopping task.; Later in the week, they were given another task, in which they had to impersonate one of their fellow housemates.; Another task was given to the housemates in which they had to make a newspaper and fill it with headlines they believe had occurred outside of the house.
Week 8	Nominations	On Day 53, the housemates nominated for the seventh and final time this season. Craig, Darren and Melanie received the most nominations and faced the public vote.
Week 8	Exits	On Day 57, Melanie was evicted from the house receiving 69% of the public vote to evict.
Week 9
Week 9	Tasks	On Day 59, The housemates were given their final task, which was divided into three parts. The first part saw the housemates learning highway code, while the second tested their physical abilities. The third portion of the task required housemates to care for an official baby. Anna was the winner of the task, and won a party with the theme of her choice.
Week 9	Exits	On Day 64, Darren left the house in third place. It was then revealed that Craig was the winner, leaving Anna as the runner-up.

== Production ==
=== Development ===
The series first launched in Netherlands, with editions in countries such as Germany proving to be hits with the public. Following the success of the show, it was confirmed that editions for the United States and the United Kingdom were in the works. Andre Anten, who was one of the directors for the original show, said the show was "like live soap... you don't know what is going to happen and that is amazing." In March 2000, it was confirmed that the show had been picked up by Channel 4, and would air in July. Casting for the series began that same month, with applications being available on the official website. Applicants who were shortlisted during the casting process underwent psychological analysis and received a nominal fee for the process. It was reported that the show received over 40,000 applications, and the housemates selected to compete in the series were kept secret until they entered the House. The series featured a live feed, which provided 24-hour coverage of the housemates. To comply with broadcasting standards, the live feed was under an estimated ten-minute delay. Commissioning editor Liz Warner said of the feeds "There's a delay on the web feed, so there's an over-ride [...] We will observe the family viewing policy before the watershed, and make sure we stick to ITC guidelines all the time."

The logo for the original series, which aired in the Netherlands.

Davina McCall was announced as the host of the show in April 2000. When asked on her feelings when joining the show, McCall stated "It's a lottery whether you take a show on or not, but you have to ask yourself, 'Would I be interested in seeing the show?' I saw a copy of the show from Holland and I loved it - fascinating viewing." The housemates entered the house on 14 July 2000. The live feed launched that day, though the series did not premiere on television until 18 July 2000. The series featured five men and five women who entered the house on the first night, however, a female later entered the house to replace an ejected housemate. Among the group was Anna Nolan, a lesbian who had previously been a nun prior to entering the house. Housemate Andrew "Andy" Davidson admitted to appearing on a live sex show, while Caroline O'Shea had previously worked in a gay bar and sold sex toys. Craig Phillips owned his own building company, while Nick Bateman was a broker. Darren Ramsay was the only housemate this series to have a child.

The first series aired for a total of six days per week, with an episode airing every night excluding Saturday. The shows airing each week were all highlights from the previous day in the house. Two episodes of the series aired on Friday. During the first episode, viewers were shown the highlights from the previous day and McCall revealed the housemate who had been evicted from the house. Two hours following this, the second episode of the night aired which saw the evicted housemate exit the house and participate in an interview with McCall. One of the highlight episodes per week featured a team of psychologists discussing the events of the previous week from their viewpoint. Big Brother 1 lasted for a total of 64 days, officially ending on 15 September 2000. The series had a total of 52 episodes, the fewest episodes for any series thus far. The theme song for the series was produced by Elementfour, and was used for the series intro as well as promotional tools. The series saw the Little Brother segment air during select episodes.

=== House ===
For the first series, the house was located in Bow, London near the 3 Mills Studios. The house used was a one-storey house with two bedrooms, a kitchen and dining room, and one bathroom. Throughout the house, there were cameras and microphones spread throughout the rooms, making all areas of the house visible to the cameras. During their stay in the house, the housemates were required to wear microphones at all times, ensuring everything they said in the house was heard. Throughout the house there were two way mirrors lined against the walls, with a production team filming behind them. The bedrooms featured infrared imaging cameras, allowing the cameras to continue filming while the lights were off. The bedrooms in the house were divided amongst the men and women. The Diary Room was where housemates were required to share their thoughts on the events in the house, and were often given tasks. The backyard of the house featured a patio area where the housemates could sit outside. The backyard also featured a chicken coop, and the housemates were able to use the eggs from the chickens as food. The housemates were given a Jacuzzi in the garden several weeks into the series.

== Ratings ==
Weekly ratings for each show on Channel 4. All numbers are in millions and provided by BARB.

Viewers (in millions)
	Week 1	Week 2	Week 3	Week 4	Week 5	Week 6	Week 7	Week 8	Week 9
Monday		2.46	2.38	2.95	3.47	4.86	5	4.32	5.56
Tuesday	3.66	2.93	2.73	3.4	4.04	5.15	6.04	5.21	5.3
Wednesday		3.21	3.37	3.74	4.33	5.63	6.67	5.92	5.07
Thursday		2.81	2.81	3.55	5.82	4.81	5.86	4.6	4.75
Friday	2	3.72	3.19	4.01	6.87	5.22	5.45	5.97	7.87
Friday	1.87	3.36	3.81	4.65	5.52	5.19	5.4	5.66	9.45
Saturday								1.7	2.62
Sunday					3.5				
Weekly average	2.51	3.08	3.05	3.57	5.01	5.14	5.74	5.27	6.33
Running average	2.51	2.8	2.88	3.05	3.44	3.73	4.01	4.17	4.41
Series average	4.44								

== Controversy and criticism ==
The series quickly became a source of controversy following its launch, with the show's format being noted as physically and mentally straining. Housemate Nick Bateman was the source of much controversy during his stay in the house. It was later reported that Nick had smuggled a mobile phone into the house, and was using it to receive information from the outside world. Production later searched the house, including Nick's belongings, though no mobile phone was found. On Day 24, a model helicopter was flown over the garden and dropped approximately forty leaflets into the house requesting that Nick be nominated for eviction; the leaflets were removed before the housemates discovered them. On Day 35, it was revealed that Nick had attempted to manipulate the nomination process, which is strictly forbidden in the rules, and Nick was subsequently removed from the house for his actions. Following the revelation that Nick had manipulated the voting, a pen and paper were found in his belongings. Nick's ejection from the house garnered much media attention.

During the eighth week in the house, housemates Craig, Darren, and Melanie were nominated for eviction. Following the announcement, a rogue e-mail was sent out to random e-mail addresses promising a holiday vacation to anyone who dialed the listed number; in actuality, the number was the line to evict Melanie from the house. Despite some controversy over the vote, it was confirmed that the e-mail had had only a small effect on the voting process as Melanie had received nearly 1.8 million more votes than Darren, who came in second in the vote. Upon exiting the house, numerous housemates expressed their disappointment with the series. Housemate Sada criticized the show following her eviction, and claimed that she had been portrayed as a "dippy hippy" rather than her true self. Melanie expressed similar displeasure with the way she was depicted on the show, and later criticized the series for "making storylines that weren't happening." She elaborated by stating "When I watched the tapes I understood that stories and storylines were made to fit any piece of footage into the storyboard and or the caricature that we were portrayed or playing. [...] It was foolish of me to think that they would give a fair portrayal of every single person." Housemate Nick Bateman later criticized Endemol for "leaving them high and dry", and later stated that they were unprepared for the way that the series affected their personal lives. He later commented that they only received one visit from the show's psychiatrist.
