= Anna Nolan =

Irish television presenter and producer

- Born: 16 October 1970 (age 55)
- Occupations: Television presenter, producer
- Known for: Appearing in Big Brother 2000 (UK)

Anna Nolan (born 16 October 1970) is an Irish television presenter, producer and former business manager, waitress and Irish international basketball player. She has presented numerous television programmes in Ireland and the UK.

== Early life ==
When she was young Nolan's mother noticed that she always ran away when young males visited and rarely dated boys. She did eventually date two men. She joined a convent in the Sisters of Loreto, and has fond memories of her time there: "I loved the nuns and the work they did. They were the coolest group of women". She left after a drunken incident which confirmed for her that "the Catholic church has no place for women really".

One year after leaving the convent, Nolan came out. Her mother asked her if she was gay at midnight on saturday in 1992 when 22-year-old Nolan arrived home from her first night out in a gay bar. Her father was welcoming of her homosexuality, offering to accompany her on nights out if she wished and giving her the following advice, "Anna, never underestimate that there are people out there who hate gays, would like to hurt gay people and will never accept them. You don't have to mix with them, but they will always be there." These words returned to her when she was filming for the BBC in Australia and was accosted by "an Australian right-wing homophobe living in Melbourne – a very damaged character".

== Career ==
=== Big Brother ===
Nolan came to prominence in 2000 as the runner up in the first series of the British reality show Big Brother. Her life as a lesbian ex-nun was central to the majority of the titillation in the first series in contrast with later series when, said the Irish Independent in 2007, "the freakshow has ratcheted to the point where Nolan would be deemed far too Waltons Mountain for Big Brother". She was present for a part of reality television history when Craig Phillips took on 'Nasty Nick' Bateman and his manipulative interferences. People ask her: "Are you Anna from Big Brother?" She used to deny this after losing interest but now she embraces her past. She describes her time in Big Brother as follows: "There were moments when I wanted to leave due to boredom, or people irritating me, or missing people at home. Did I enjoy it? It wasn't about enjoying it, it was about getting through it." Prior to entering Big Brother, Nolan thought nobody would watch the show as she had discussed it with two friends and "One of them said, 'Why on earth would anyone want to watch that?' and we changed the subject". In June 2010, RTÉ Ten named Nolan as one of its "Top 10 BB Housemates".

=== Presenting ===
After leaving the Big Brother house, she began working in television, paving the way for future Big Brother housemates who were to do the same, such as Jade Goody, Chantelle Houghton and Nikki Grahame. Nolan worked for the BBC on two series, Anna in Wonderland and Closure. She also began working for RTÉ. Nolan co-presented The Afternoon Show on RTÉ One, along with Bláthnaid Ní Chofaigh. She spent three years presenting this. She announced in August 2006 that she would not be renewing her contract for the third series. She was replaced with first-season host (who was not present in season 2) Sheana Keane.

Nolan has stood in for Marian Finucane on RTÉ Radio, most memorably during the Kevin Myers "bastards" controversy in 2005, with the Irish media noting the irony of Nolan being a sister-in-law of Myers.

In August 2006, Nolan was a presenter of the BBC programme Inside Out when the BBC North East and Cumbria crew filmed Anomalous Phenomena Investigations of Newcastle upon Tyne, conducting a paranormal investigation at Hurworth Grange Community Centre in Hurworth-on-Tees. The show aired on 30 October 2006.

Nolan has been an occasional panellist on RTÉ Two discussion show The Panel. From 2007 to 2009 she was a reporter for the RTÉ series Would You Believe. She has cooked a meal on The Restaurant. She co-hosted Celebrities Go Wild with Aidan Power in October 2007. In December 2007, she presented Webs of Desire on RTÉ One, during which she investigated the sexual possibilities of the internet, attended a fetishist club to discuss bondage discipline sado-masochism (BDSM) with a male person and interviewed an anonymous man who was accompanied by the caption "Individual Addicted to Porn." In August 2010, Nolan featured in Ultimate Big Brother, during which Nikki Grahame felt her head.

=== Producing ===
In 2011, Nolan produced the show Operation Transformation. She also produced reality show Mission Beach for RTÉ. She writes a weekly column for the Evening Herald. In 2012, she directed her first documentary "Perfect Heart", about one man's wait for a heart transplant. She was series producer of the RTÉ show "Room To Improve" in 2012. Nolan presented The Great Irish Bake Off for TV3 and in 2014 was the Development Executive for COCO Television. As of 2022, Nolan is Head of Development at COCO Content. She also produced the St.Patricks Day 2024 Parade coverage on RTE Television, for COCO.

== Personal life ==
Nolan was in a long-term relationship with Dearbhla Walsh, an Emmy Award-winning drama director but in 2014 she told Brendan O’Connor on The Saturday Night Show that she "had to adjust to being single".

Big Brother host Davina McCall said that Anna Nolan was the only Big Brother housemate she ever befriended and that in 2023 the two remain in contact. Nolan has also maintained contact with Craig Phillips and Mel Hill. She was also supportive of Jade Goody during her cancer battle, and met her a number of times, even though they featured in separate series of Big Brother.

Nolan, who was previously a sister in Dublin's Loreto Order, today considers herself an atheist. On 10 January 2010, she hosted a special one-off programme for RTÉ One television entitled O Sister Where Art Thou? during which she attempted to track down and interview women with whom she had shared noviciate life in the order. At the end of the programme, while in conversation with a fellow former novice, she said: "I don't believe in God. I don't think there's a Heaven or Hell. I believe in the human spirit. I think we all make choices. I think we all have fears and for some people, when they get the fears or worries, they turn to a higher power. I just kind of deal with it. And when I go, that's it; I'm gone into the ground and 'goodbye world'. Which isn't depressing; some people might find it depressing. And I might be wrong and that's the good thing because if I'm wrong I'll get into heaven(!)".
