= Biddy White Lennon =

Irish actress and food writer

- Born: 5 September 1946; Dublin, Ireland
- Died: 25 November 2017 (aged 71); Ireland
- Occupation: Actress
- Notable work: The Riordans; Wild Food (O'Brien Press)

Biddy White Lennon (5 September 1946 – 25 November 2017) was an Irish actress and food writer.

== Life ==
White Lennon was born in Dublin and began acting when she was four. Her mother was Ursula White, a drama professor who ran a school of acting in the Pocket Theatre at Ely Place (one of her students was Joe Dowling while Deirdre O'Connell used the school as her foundation for the Stanislavski Studio). Her father died while she was under ten.

White Lennon started in The Riordans when the programme first aired in January 1965. She played the role of Maggie Riordan (née Nael), daughter-in-law of the matriarch and wife of Benjy, and she remained on the show until its cancellation in 1979. When the series was brought to the radio, White Lennon wrote for it. She later appeared as a judge on TV3's The Great Irish Bake Off.

After her appearance on The Riordans, White Lennon went on to become well regarded in the culinary world and became founder member and Chairwoman of the Irish Food Writers Guild. White Lennon was also editor of the Irish Home Diary and food writer for both the Irish Home Diary and to Food and Wine Magazine.

In her later years, White Lennon lived in County Wexford with her husband Denis Latimer, who died in December 2016. They had one son, Dairsie.

== Books ==
- Wild Food
- The Very Best of Traditional Irish Cooking
- Best of Irish Home Baking
- Irish Cooking
- Best of Irish Potato Recipes
- A Taste of Ireland
- Best of Irish Traditional Cooking
- Best of Irish Festive Cooking
- Irish Food & Cooking
- The Irish Heritage Cookbook
- Classic Recipes of Ireland
- The Irish Kitchen
- Best of Irish Meat Recipes
- Traditional Cooking of Ireland
- The Irish Kitchen
- Eating at Home Cook Book
- Poolbeg Book of Traditional Irish Cooking
- Leaving Home Cook Book
- The Irish Heritage Cookbook
