= The Great Irish Bake Off =

- Genre: Baking cooking
- Presented by: Anna Nolan
- Judges: Paul Kelly (Series 1–3); Lilly Higgins (Series 3); Biddy White Lennon (Series 1–2)
- Country of origin: Ireland
- Original language: English
- No. of series: 3
- No. of episodes: 24

Production
- Producers: Grainne O'Carroll; Simon Proctor
- Production locations: Tinakilly House, Rathnew, Co Wicklow
- Production company: Sideline

Original release
- Network: TV3
- Release: 19 September 2013 – 13 December 2015

Related
- The Great British Bake Off

The Great Irish Bake Off was an Irish reality TV cooking series. The show was based on the successful BBC show The Great British Bake Off. The show was produced by Sideline Productions for the TV3 Group. It premiered on TV3 Ireland on 19 September 2013, broadcasting for three seasons.

Series 1 and 2 were broadcast on Thursday nights from 21:00. Series 3 launched in a Sunday night slot on 25 October 2015 at 21:00.

In August 2016, the TV3 Group confirmed the series would not return for a fourth season run; however, the broadcaster did not rule out of returning to the series at a later date. The show was replaced by Masterchef Ireland and Celebrity Masterchef Ireland.

== Format ==
The show consisted of 8 episodes where in each episode the bakers were tasked with two different challenges; a signature bake and a technical bake or a technical bake and a showstopper. Unlike The Great British Bake Off, the bakers only faced two challenges each episode, the bakes were then critically examined by the judges who then chose a "Star Baker" and a baker to be eliminated from the competition. Twelve contestants were chosen for each series.

Signature Challenge: This challenge is for the amateur bakers to show off their tried-and-tested recipes that are rustic and altogether home-made-looking.
Technical Challenge: This challenge shows who can follow instructions, but who also has the technical knowledge and experience to produce the finished product. The bakers are all given the same recipe, which is set by the judges, and are not told beforehand what the challenge will be. The finished product is ranked from worst to best, with the judges not knowing who produced which.
Showstopper Challenge: This challenge is for the bakers to show off their unique skills and talent. The judges are looking for a bake that is both of a professional appearance but also in taste.

== Series overview ==
Series	Episodes	Premiere	Finale	Runners-up	Winner
1	8	19 September 2013	7 November 2013	Maryanne Dalton	Stephen Chisholm
1	8	19 September 2013	7 November 2013	Will De Korte	Stephen Chisholm
2	8	21 May 2014	9 July 2014	Ali Mitter	Tracy Coyne
2	8	21 May 2014	9 July 2014	Shane Murray	Tracy Coyne
3	8	25 October 2015	13 December 2015	Emer Hough	Cathy McKenna
3	8	25 October 2015	13 December 2015	Clare Ryan	Cathy McKenna

=== Series 1 (2013) ===
Series 1 of The Great Irish Bake Off saw twelve home bakers take part in a bake-off to test their baking skills as they battled to be crowned The Great Irish Bake Off's best amateur baker. Each week saw the bakers put through two challenges in a particular discipline. The series final saw Stephen Chisholm win with Maryanne Dalton and Will De Korte as the runners up.

=== Series 2 (2014) ===
Series 2 of The Great Irish Bake Off saw twelve home bakers take part in a bake-off to test their baking skills as they battled to be crowned The Great Irish Bake Off's best amateur baker. The second series aired in Summer 2014 and was filmed at Tinakilly House, Co Wicklow.

=== Series 3 (2015) ===
Series 3 of The Great Irish Bake Off returned to Tinakilly House, Co Wicklow and saw twelve home bakers take part in a bake-off to test their baking skills as they battle to be crowned The Great Irish Bake Off's best amateur baker. Cork born Lilly Higgins (food blogger, Irish Times columnist, photographer and author) joined Paul Kelly (Executive Pastry Chef at Dublin's Merrion Hotel) as a judge. The third series began airing on Sunday 25 October 2015 with a repeat showing on Saturday evenings. The winner was Cathy McKenna from Monaghan who beat Emer Hough and Clare Ryan in the Grand Final. In The Great Irish Christmas Bake Off - a one off seasonal special - judges Paul Kelly and Lilly Higgins demonstrated Christmas bakes and makes and there was a Celebrity Bake Off between Pantomime Stars and Presenters. Actor George McMahon and singer Leanne Moore represented Team Panto while Lucy Kennedy and Martin King from TV3's 'Seven O'Clock Show' were on the Presenters team. The judges crowned Leanne Moore Star Baker.

== Reception ==
=== Critical reception ===
The show averaged over 200,000 viewers per episode and returned for a second series in Summer 2014 and a third in the Autumn of 2015. Series 3 opened with ratings up 25% on the previous year.
