= The All Ireland Talent Show series 3 =

The All Ireland Talent Show
- Series 3
- Hosted by: Gráinne Seoige (RTÉ One); Aidan Power (RTÉ Two); Dustin (RTÉ Two)
- Judges: John Creedon; Amanda Brunker; Bláthnaid Ní Chofaigh; Dáithí Ó Sé; Dana
- Winner: Daniel Furlong
- Runner-up: Don Stiffe

Release
- Original network: RTÉ One; RTÉ Two (Backstage)
- Original release: 21 August 2010 – 27 March 2011

Series chronology
- ← Previous; Series 2

The third and final series of The All Ireland Talent Show was announced in August 2010. The first show was broadcast on 21 August 2010. The third series aired on RTÉ One, it was hosted by Gráinne Seoige. This series was produced by Tyrone Productions.

Once again prize money of €50,000 was awarded to the eventual winner of the show; who was Daniel Furlong, with Bláthnaid the winning judge. The result also marked the third time a child act won the show, following The Mulkerrin Brothers and Chloe Coyle in the previous two series'.

This was the final series. The All Ireland Talent Show was subsequently axed in July 2011, and replaced by The Voice of Ireland, a part of The Voice TV series, which began airing the following year in 2012.

== Personnel ==
=== Presenters ===
Gráinne Seoige returned as presenter in her only role on the channel. Aidan Power & Dustin returned to present The All Ireland Talent Show Backstage on RTÉ Two

=== Judges ===
Original Dublin judge, Shane Lynch announced his departure from the show. Amanda Brunker took his place. The other judges for this series remained: 1970 Eurovision Song Contest winner and conservative politician Dana (North), broadcaster John Creedon (South), television presenter and Irish language enthusiast Bláthnaid Ní Chofaigh (East) and television personality and weather forecaster Dáithí Ó Sé (West). Backstage presenter Aidan Power filled in for Bláthnaid during the heat six results show as she was ill.

== Auditions ==
Audition City	Date	Venue	Head Judge	Advisors
Dublin	21 August	Griffith Conference Centre	Amanda Brunker	Shane Lynch & Larry Gogan
Cork	28 August	The Clarion Hotel	John Creedon	Emma O'Driscoll & Joe O'Shea
Galway	4 September	The Radisson Blu Hotel & Spa	Dáithí Ó Sé	Síle Seoige & Pádraic Breathnach
Derry	11 September	The Everglades Hotel	Dana	Joe Lindsay & Majella O'Donnell
Kilkenny	18 September	The Kilkenny Ormonde Hotel	Bláthnaid Ní Chofaigh	Cormac Battle & Brenda Donahue

=== West Auditions ===
Head judge:
Dáithí Ó Sé
Assistant judges:
Síle Seoige & Pádraic Breathnach
Final eight:
Aoife and Paul Moroney
Karate Pencil Case
Jacks Angels
Sean Nós ar an tSionnan
Cosa Beoga
Richard Cunningham
Politically Correct
Don Stiffe

=== East Auditions ===
Head judge:
Bláthnaid Ní Chofaigh
Assistant judges:
Cormac Battle & Brenda Donahue
Final eight:
Jackson 3
Lil' Dukebox
Daniel Furlong
The Myth
Claire Mulholland
Arlene Caffrey
Feverfelt
Bernadette Spain

=== Dublin Auditions ===
Head judge:
Amanda Brunker
Assistant judges:
Shane Lynch and Larry Gogan
Final eight:
Kyle Kennedy
Anthony White
Wallis Hamilton
Dan Dennehy
Owen Gerrard
Shauna Buckingham
Must Try D 'N' D
Síle Keogh

=== South Auditions ===
Head judge:
John Creedon
Assistant judges:
Emma O'Driscoll & Joe O'Shea
Final eight:
Seamus & Tomas
Halo
Johnny Mack
Mad 4 Road
Darragh Merrit
Fitzy Chicks
2 Day Nation
Shane Doonan

=== North Auditions ===
Head judge:
Dana
Assistant judges:
Joe Lindsay & Majella O'Donnell
Final eight:
The Virginia Gospel Choir
Áine Hassan
Fox 'N' Crew
Louise Florence
Brian Sheerin
The Ward Sisters
Maggie Ferris
Jim Devine

== Live Heats ==
Each heat five contestants would take the stage. One representing each judge and region of Ireland. The judges would score an act after their performance and then the act with the highest score would gain 5 points and the second highest scoring act would gain 4 points etc. The same would be done with the public vote. The scores would then be added and the act with the most combined score would gain first place and advance to the semi-finals.(In the event of a tie the act with the most viewer votes would take higher ranking.) From the 2nd and 3rd placed acts the judges would choose an act to send through to the wildcard show.

=== Contestants ===
Key	Winner	Runner-up	Third Place	Finalist	Semi-finalist	Wildcard	Quarter-finalist (lost judges vote)

Name of act	Mentor	Region	Heat	Semi	Position reached
2 Day Nation	John Creedon	South	8	2	Semi-finalist
Áine Hassan	Dana	North	5	N/A	Quarter-finalist. Eliminated in judges vote
Anthony White	Amanda Brunker	Dublin	2	N/A	Quarter-finalist
Aoife and Paul Moroney	Dáithí Ó Sé	West	6	N/A	Quarter-finalist. Eliminated in judges vote
Arlene Caffrey	Bláthnaid Ní Chofaigh	East	1	N/A	Quarter-finalist
Bernadette Spain	Bláthnaid Ní Chofaigh	East	2	N/A	Quarter-finalist
Brian Sheerin	Dana	North	4	1	Finalist
Claire Mulholland	Bláthnaid Ní Chofaigh	East	8	N/A	Wildcard Show
Cosa Beoga	Dáithí Ó Sé	West	5	1	Finalist
Daniel Dennehy	Amanda Brunker	Dublin	8	N/A	Quarter-finalist
Daniel Furlong	Bláthnaid Ní Chofaigh	East	7	2	Winner
Darragh Merrit	John Creedon	South	4	N/A	Wildcard Show
Don Stiffe	Dáithí Ó Sé	West	3	N/A	Runner-up
Feverfelt	Bláthnaid Ní Chofaigh	East	6	N/A	Quarter-finalist
Fitzy Chicks	John Creedon	South	2	1	Semi-finalist
Fox'N'Crew	Dana	North	6	N/A	Quarter-finalist
Halo	John Creedon	South	7	N/A	Quarter-finalist
Jack's Angels	Dáithí Ó Sé	West	4	N/A	Quarter-finalist. Eliminated in judges vote
Jackson 3	Bláthnaid Ní Chofaigh	East	4	N/A	Quarter-finalist
Jim Devine	Dana	North	7	N/A	Quarter-finalist. Eliminated in judges vote
Johnny Mack	John Creedon	South	1	N/A	Quarter-finalist. Eliminated in judges vote
Karate Pencil Case	Dáithí Ó Sé	West	2	N/A	Wildcard Show
Kyle Kennedy	Amanda Brunker	Dublin	5	N/A	Quarter-finalist
Lil' Dukebox	Bláthnaid Ní Chofaigh	East	5	N/A	Quarter-finalist
Louise Florence	Dana	North	2	N/A	Quarter-finalist. Eliminated in judges vote
Mad 4 Road	John Creedon	South	6	2	Third Place
Maggie Ferris	Dana	North	8	N/A	Quarter-finalist
Must Try D'n'D	Amanda Brunker	Dublin	7	N/A	Quarter-finalist
The Myth	Bláthnaid Ní Chofaigh	East	3	N/A	Quarter-finalist
Owen Gerrard	Amanda Brunker	Dublin	1	N/A	Quarter-finalist
Politically Correct	Dáithí Ó Sé	West	7	2	Semi-finalist
Richard Cunningham	Dáithí Ó Sé	West	8	N/A	Quarter-finalist. Eliminated in judges vote
Seamus & Tomas	John Creedon	South	3	N/A	Quarter-finalist. Eliminated in judges vote
Sean Nós ar an tSionann	Dáithí Ó Sé	West	1	2	Finalist
Shane Doonan	John Creedon	South	5	N/A	Wildcard Show
Shauna Buckingham	Amanda Brunker	Dublin	6	1	Semi-finalist
Síle Keogh	Amanda Brunker	Dublin	4	N/A	Quarter-finalist
Virginia Gospel Choir	Dana	North	1	N/A	Wildcard Show
Wallis	Amanda Brunker	Dublin	3	N/A	Wildcard Show
The Ward Sisters	Dana	North	3	N/A	Quarter-finalist

=== Live Heats summary ===
Key	The act came in first place. Advanced to the semi-finals.		Finished in either second or third place. Won the judges' vote & advanced to wildcard show.		Finished in either second or third place. Lost the judges' vote & was eliminated.
Key	(Ulster) - Representing the North; Mentored by Dana	(Munster) - Representing the South; Mentored by John Creedon	(Connacht) - Representing the West; Mentored by Dáithí O'Sé	Representing Dublin; Mentored by Amanda Brunker	(Leinster) - Representing the East; Mentored by Bláthnaid Ní Chofaigh

==== Heat 1 (31 December) ====
Contestants	Order		Judges' scores							Result
Contestants	Order		Amanda	John	Dana	Dáithí	Bláthnaid	Total	Ranking	Result
Virginia Gospel Choir	1	(Ulster)	9	7	-	8	7	31	Joint 1st	2nd/3rd:Won judges wildcard vote
Johnny Mack	2	(Munster)	8	-	7	9	7	31	Joint 1st	2nd/3rd:Lost judges wildcard vote
Sean Nós ar an tSionann	3	(Connacht)	6	6	7	-	9	28	3rd	1st:Through to semi-final
Owen Gerrard	4		-	5	9	6	6	26	5th	4th:Eliminated
Arlene Caffrey	5	(Leinster)	5	8	6	8	-	27	4th	5th:Eliminated

Judges' votes to send through to the wildcard show

- Amanda Brunker: The Virginia Gospel Choir
- Dáithí Ó Sé: Johnny Mack
- Bláthnaid Ní Chofaigh: Virginia Gospel Choir

The Virginia Gospel Choir were sent to the wildcard show with 2–1 majority.

==== Heat 2 (9 January) ====
Contestants	Order		Judges' scores							Result
Contestants	Order		Amanda	John	Dana	Dáithí	Bláthnaid	Total	Ranking	Result
Bernadette Spain	1	(Leinster)	8	8	8	9	-	33	Joint 1st	4th:Eliminated
Anthony White	2		-	8	7	8	8	31	Joint 3rd	5th:Eliminated
Karate Pencil Case	3	(Connacht)	9	7	7	-	8	31	Joint 3rd	2nd/3rd:Won judges wildcard vote
Louise Florence	4	(Ulster)	7	8	-	9	7	31	Joint 3rd	2nd/3rd:Lost judges wildcard vote
Fitzy Chicks	5	(Munster)	8	-	8	10	7	33	Joint 1st	1st:Through to semi-final

Judges' votes to send through to the wildcard show

- Amanda Brunker: Karate Pencil Case
- John Creedon: Louise Florence
- Bláthnaid Ní Chofaigh: Karate Pencil Case

Karate Pencil Case were sent to the wildcard show with 2–1 majority.

==== Heat 3 (16 January) ====
Guest Performer: Tommy Fleming

Contestants	Order		Judges' scores							Result
Contestants	Order		Amanda	John	Dana	Dáithí	Bláthnaid	Total	Ranking	Result
Don Stiffe	1	(Connacht)	8	9	9	-	7	33	Joint 2nd	1st:Through to semi-final
Séamus & Tomás	2	(Munster)	7	-	7	7	8	29	4th	2nd/3rd:Lost judges wildcard vote
The Ward Sisters	3	(Ulster)	7	7	-	7	6	27	5th	5th:Eliminated
Wallis Hamilton	4		-	8	8	8	9	33	Joint 2nd	2nd/3rd:Won judges wildcard vote
The Myth	5	(Leinster)	9	8	9	8	-	34	1st	4th:eliminated

Judges' votes to send through to the wildcard show

- Bláthnaid Ní Chofaigh: Wallis Hamilton
- Dáithí Ó Sé: Wallis Hamilton
- Dana: was not required to vote as there was already a majority

Wallis Hamilton was sent to the wildcard show with 2–0 majority.

==== Heat 4 (23 January) ====
Guest Performer: The High Kings

Contestants	Order		Judges' scores							Result
Contestants	Order		Amanda	John	Dana	Dáithí	Bláthnaid	Total	Ranking	Result
Brian Sheerin	1	(Ulster)	10	7	-	9	8	34	2nd	1st:Through to semi-final
Jack's Angels	2	(Connacht)	7	6	7	-	7	27	5th	2nd/3rd: Lost judges wildcard vote
Jackson 3	3	(Leinster)	8	7	7	7	-	29	4th	5th:Eliminated
Síle Keogh	4		-	7	8	8	7	30	3rd	4th:Eliminated
Darragh Merritt	5	(Munster)	9	-	10	9	9	37	1st	2nd/3rd:Won judges wildcard vote

Judges' votes to send through to the wildcard show

- Amanda Brunker: Darragh Merritt
- Dana: Darragh Merritt
- Bláthnaid Ní Chofaigh: was not required to vote as there was already a majority

Darragh Merritt was sent to the wildcard show with 2–0 majority

==== Heat 5 (30 January) ====
Guest Performer: Imelda May

Contestants	Order		Judges' scores							Result
Contestants	Order		Amanda	John	Dana	Dáithí	Bláthnaid	Total	Ranking	Result
Kyle Kennedy	1		-	9	9	9	9	36	1st	4th:Eliminated
Áine Hassin	2	(Ulster)	9	8	-	8	10	35	Joint 2nd	2nd/3rd: Lost judges vote
Cosa Beoga	3	(Connacht)	7	9	10	-	8	34	4th	1st:Through to semi-final
Shane Doonan	4	(Munster)	8	-	7	10	10	35	Joint 2nd	2nd/3rd:Won judges wildcard vote
Lil' Dukebox	5	(Leinster)	7	7	7	6	-	27	5th	5th:Eliminated

Judges' votes to send through to the wildcard show

- Amanda Brunker: Aine Hassin
- Dáithí Ó Sé: Shane Doonan
- Bláthnaid Ní Chofaigh: Shane Doonan - initially refused to vote and wanted to revert to the public vote, as she had given both acts the same score. However she was told this was not an option and voted.

Shane Doonan was sent to the wildcard show with 2–1 majority.

==== Heat 6 (6 February) ====
Guest Performer: Shayne Ward
Bláthnaid Ní Chofaigh was present for the first show but was not present for the results show as she was ill. Backstage presenter Aidan Power filled in for her.

Contestants	Order		Judges' scores							Result
Contestants	Order		Amanda	John	Dana	Dáithí	Bláthnaid (Power)	Total	Ranking	Result
Mad 4 Road	1	(Munster)	9	-	8	10	8	35	Joint 1st	1st:Through to semi-final
Shauna Buckingham	2		-	8	9	9	9	35	Joint 1st	2nd/3rd:Won judges wildcard vote
Fever Felt	3	(Leinster)	9	8	7	8	-	32	3rd	5th:Eliminated
Fox 'N' Crew	4	(Ulster)	8	7	-	8	7	30	4th	4th:Eliminated
Aoife and Paul Moroney	5	(Connacht)	7	8	7	-	7	29	5th	2nd/3rd: Lost judges wildcard vote

Judges' votes to send through to the wildcard show

- John Creedon:Shauna Buckingham
- Dana: Shauna Buckingham
- Aidan Power: was not required to vote as there was already a majority

Shauna Buckingham was sent to the wildcard show with 2–0 majority

==== Heat 7 (13 February) ====
Guest Performer: Majella O'Donnell featuring Daniel O'Donnell

Contestants	Order		Judges' scores							Result
Contestants	Order		Amanda	John	Dana	Dáithí	Bláthnaid	Total	Ranking	Result
Daniel Furlong	1	(Leinster)	9	9	8	9	-	35	1st	2nd/3rd:Won judges wildcard vote
Halo	2	(Munster)	8	-	7	8	7	30	5th	5th:Eliminated
Politically Correct	3	(Connacht)	8	9	9	-	8	34	2nd	1st:Through to semi-final
Must Try D'n'D	4		-	8	9	8	8	33	3rd	4th:Eliminated
Jim Devine	5	(Ulster)	8	8	-	9	7	32	4th	2nd/3rd: Lost judges wildcard vote

Judges' votes to send through to the wildcard show

- Amanda Brunker: Daniel Furlong
- John Creedon: Daniel Furlong
- Dáithí O'Sé : was not required to vote as there was already a majority

Daniel Furlong was sent to the wildcard show with 2–0 majority

==== Heat 8 (20 February) ====
Guest Performer: Frankie Gavin with De Dannan

Contestants	Order		Judges' scores							Result
Contestants	Order		Amanda	John	Dana	Dáithí	Bláthnaid	Total	Ranking	Result
Maggie Ferris	1	(Ulster)	8	7	-	8	6	29	4th	4th:Eliminated
2 Day Nation	2	(Munster)	10	-	9	10	10	39	1st	1st:Through to semi-final
Richard Cunningham	3	(Connacht)	6	7	6	-	7	26	5th	2nd/3rd: Lost judges wildcard vote
Daniel Dennehy	4		-	9	8	9	8	34	3rd	5th:Eliminated
Claire Mulholland	5	(Leinster)	9	9	8	9	-	35	2nd	2nd/3rd:Won judges wildcard vote

Judges' votes to send through to the wildcard show

- Dana: Claire Mulholland
- Amanda Brunker: Claire Mulholland
- John Creedon:was not required to vote as there was already a majority

Claire Mulholland was sent to the wildcard show with 2–0 majority

2 Day Nation received the highest judges vote in the three-year history of the show.

==== Wildcard Heat (27 February) ====
Guest Performer: Miracle Bell

Contestants	Order		Result
Daniel Furlong	1	(Leinster)	Top 2: Through to semi-final
Daragh Merritt	2	(Munster)	8th: Eliminated
Wallis	3		7th: Eliminated
Virginia Gospel Choir	4	(Ulster)	3rd: Eliminated
Karate Pencil Case	5	(Connacht)	4th: Eliminated
Claire Mulholland	6	(Leinster)	5th: Eliminated
Shane Doonan	7	(Munster)	6th: Eliminated
Shauna Buckingham	8		Top 2: Through to semi-final

== Semi-finals ==
=== Semi-final 1 (6 March) ===
Guest Performer: Sharon Shannon

Order	Contestant	Act	Mentor (Region)	Place	Result
1	Cosa Beoga	Sean-Ós Dancers	Dáithí Ó Sé (West)	2nd	Through to final
2	Fitzy Chicks	Singing Duo	John Creedon (South)	5th	Eliminated
3	Don Stiffe	Classical Singer	Dáithí Ó Sé (West)	1st	Through to final
4	Shauna Buckingham	Opera Singer	Amanda Brunker (Dublin)	4th	Eliminated
5	Brian Sheerin	Singer	Dana (North)	3rd	Through to final

=== Semi-final 2 (13 March) ===
Guest Performer: The Wanted

Order	Contestant	Act	Mentor (Region)	Place	Result
1	Mad 4 Road	Band	John Creedon (South)	1st	Through to final
2	Politically Correct	Opera Singing Duo	Dáithí Ó Sé (West)	4th	Eliminated
3	2 Day Nation	Band	John Creedon (South)	5th	Eliminated
4	Daniel Furlong	Opera Singer	Bláthnaid Ní Chofaigh (East)	2nd	Through to final
5	Sean Nós ar an tSionann	Sean-Ós Dancers	Dáithí Ó Sé (West)	3rd	Through to final

== Final (20 March) ==
Guest Performer: Olly Murs

Final Six

For the first time in the history of The All Ireland Talent Show the final had two stages. During the first show all six finalists performed and lines opened after the last act performed.

Order	Contestant	Act	Mentor (Region)	Place	Result
1	Don Stiffe	Classical Singer	Dáithí Ó Sé (West)	2nd	Safe
2	Mad 4 Road	Band	John Creedon (South)	3rd	Safe
3	Cosa Beoga	Sean-Ós Dancers	Dáithí Ó Sé (West)	4th	Eliminated
4	Brian Sheerin	Singer	Dana (North)	5th	Eliminated
5	Sean Nós ar an tSionann	Sean-Ós Dancers	Dáithí Ó Sé (West)	6th	Eliminated
6	Daniel Furlong	Opera Singer	Bláthnaid Ní Chofaigh (East)	1st	Safe

Final Showdown

At the start of the results show the lines were frozen and the three least popular acts were eliminated. The lines then re-opened with all votes cast earlier still counting. The three remaining acts performed again performing a shorter version of the songs they sang in the live heats.

Order	Contestant	Act	Mentor (Region)	Place
1	Daniel Furlong	Opera Singer	Bláthnaid Ní Chofaigh (East)	Winner
2	Mad 4 Road	Band	John Creedon (South)	Third Place
3	Don Stiffe	Classical Singer	Dáithí Ó Sé (West)	Runner-up
