= The All Ireland Talent Show series 1 =

The All Ireland Talent Show
- Series 1
- Hosted by: Gráinne Seoige
- Judges: John Creedon; Shane Lynch; Bláthnaid Ní Chofaigh; Dáithí Ó Sé; Dana Rosemary Scallon
- Winner: The Mulkerrins
- Runner-up: Jack Lynch

Release
- Original network: RTÉ One
- Original release: 4 January – 15 March 2009

Series chronology
- Next → Series 2

The first series of The All Ireland Talent Show was announced in November 2008 and commenced broadcasting on 4 January 2009, completing its first series on 15 March 2009. Modelled on Britain's Got Talent, it was produced by Tyrone Productions. Airing on RTÉ One, it was hosted by Gráinne Seoige.

Auditions took place in five locations across Ireland in November and December 2008. The auditions were divided into five regions with contestants competing only in their region of origin. The regions are Ulster, Connacht, Munster, Dublin and non-Dublin Leinster. The auditions commenced airing on 4 January 2009. There were five judges and each regional judge, with the assistance of two other personalities who then disappear from the show, selected five acts to be put forward to the live studio heats, which began in February 2009. Louis Walsh was approached to act as a judge but refused to commit. On the opening night of series one, The All Ireland Talent Show had over 500,000 viewers, with Ireland only having a population of over four million people. The opening was similar to the Got Talent series. The twenty-five finalists competed for a first prize of €50,000, which was eventually won by Mulkerrin Brothers of the Aran Islands.

== Auditions ==
Region	Episode	Date
1	Jungle Story	15 November 2002
2	SS, Galway	22 November 2002
3	Doctors and Nurses	29 November 2002
4	Fish Supper	6 December 2002
5	NewBorn Baby	13 December 2002

== Judges ==
The five judges were announced on 13 November 2008. Each had two advisors.

Region	Judge	Assistant Judges
Dublin	Shane Lynch	Evelyn O'Rourke/John Keogh
West	Dáithí Ó Sé	Bláthnaid Ní Chofaigh/Páraic Breathnach
North	Dana	Majella O'Donnell/Joe Lindsay
East	Bláthnaid Ní Chofaigh	Cormac Battle/Frank McNamara
South	John Creedon	Michael Healy-Rae/Sinéad Sheppard

Shane Lynch expressed his concern over the tactical voting of other judges, saying that he felt some of them were deciding upon their marks in what he viewed as an incorrect way. "It's going to affect me, don't get me wrong, it has affected me in fact", he told RTÉ.ie. Referring to the elimination of his dance act Raw Edge Crew, Lynch commented: "They should have done it (progressed)... and there was tactical voting involved". Bláthnaid Ní Chofaigh has described herself as the "most honest" judge. Judge Dáithí also reported his dissatisfaction with his fellow judges. Judge Creedon reported his dissatisfaction with Judge Dáithí after the series.

== List of contestants ==
=== Week one (Dublin) ===
The first episode was broadcast on 4 January 2009. It featured the Dublin auditions which saw Shane Lynch choose five acts to compete.

==== Angela Mykolyuk ====
Angela Mykolyuk (Cyrillic: Анжела Миколюк) is six years old. Her pearents originally from Ukraine and she lives in Clontarf with her family. At the auditions she sang "Fabulous" from High School Musical 2 to her own dance routine. Judge Shane Lynch advanced her despite the protests of his advisors Evelyn O'Rourke and John Keogh.

==== Bert and Victor O'Brien ====
Bert and Victor O'Brien are thirteen-year-old twins from Kilbarrack. Their mother bought a guitar for both of them. They earn about €80 for their busking sessions. At the auditions they sang "Coming Around Again" by Simon Webbe.

==== Elle N Elle ====
Elle N Elle are composed of Irish-French rappers Tamara Opreri and Vilma Barbosa from the James Street area. The duo write their own hip hop tracks and describe their songs as "accessible soft rap".

==== Genesis ====
Genesis are a ten-piece dance troupe from across the city. They range in age from twelve to seventeen and many have previously performed on The Late Late Toy Show, The Den and Kazoo. They dance using theatrical white masks.

==== Raw Edge Crew ====
Raw Edge Crew are a group of dance teachers from Blanchardstown aged from twenty to twenty-three. At the auditions they performed a hip hop medley ending in a tribute to Riverdance. They have been together for seven years and have previously represented Ireland in dance competitions in the United States and Germany. They share their skills with children from difficult backgrounds. They exited the competition after missing out on being the wild-card entry in the first live final on 8 February 2009.

=== Week two (The West) ===
The second episode was broadcast on 11 January 2009. It featured auditions from the West which saw Daithí Ó Sé choose five acts to compete.

==== Rachel Goode ====
Rachel Goode is a 17-year-old who lives in Ballinasloe, County Galway. She is a classical singer with an admiration for Charlotte Church.

==== Eva and Bernard Coyle ====
Eva and Bernard Coyle are a father and daughter act, who live in Roscommon. While Eva sings, her dad accompanies her on the guitar. Judge Daithí was worried that her dad would simply be an after thought, while live in-studio, with background music, but Daithí put them through as a duo.

==== Daithí Ó Drónaí ====
Daithí Ó Drónaí is an 18-year-old, who lives in Galway. He plays the electric fiddle, and performed his own piece in the auditions called, "Daithí Embraces the Night". Ó Drónaí qualified for the final in week six.

==== Lilac Blues ====
Lilac Blues are a four-piece original band from the Midlands, Kathleen and Laura are on vocals singing in melodic harmonies, Emmett on drums, and Alan on guitar. they will sing an original song for the semi-finals.

==== The Mullkerrins ====
The Mulkerrins are a traditional group. They consist of three brothers from the Aran Islands off the west coast of the mainland. 14-year-old Padraig plays the accordion, 11-year-old Eamonn plays the fiddle, and 9-year-old Séan is a sean nós dancer. Their younger (fourth) brother cheers them on from the sidelines. The brothers progressed to the series finale and won the series on 15 March 2009.

=== Week three (The North) ===
The third episode was broadcast on 18 January 2009. It featured auditions from the North which saw Dana Rosemary Scallon choose five acts to compete.

==== Niamh McGlinchey ====
Niamh McGlinchey is 17-year-old from County Londonderry. She is a singer and the current winner of The All Ireland Scór na nÓg Singing Contest. She is currently doing her A-levels at St Patrick's Maghera.

==== Rapture ====
Rapture are a hip hop dance crew from Belfast. They have ten members, all of whom are under eighteen years of age. They recently appeared on Britain's Got Talent

==== Donegal Tenors ====
Donegal Tenors are a four-piece group from County Donegal. None of the members sing professionally but they do sing as a hobby. They exited in week six.

==== Clíona Hagan ====
Clíona Hagan is a 19-year-old opera singer from County Tyrone. If she wins she intends to spend the money helping her Granny, who cares for a relative.

==== The Rooneys ====
The Rooneys are a family traditional group from County Down, ranging in age from fourteen to twenty-two years. They have performed in the past, in front of 4,000 people, in Belfast.

=== Week four (The East) ===
The fourth episode was broadcast on 25 January 2009. It featured auditions from the East which saw Bláthnaid Ní Chofaigh choose five acts to compete.

==== Holly Ann Traynor ====
Holly Ann Traynor is a 20-year-old poet from County Louth. She writes her own poetry which she then acts out in various accents.

==== Lauren Murtagh ====
Lauren Murtagh is a 7-year-old singer. She sang The Zutons song "Valerie" at the auditions. She is from Navan County Meath. She narrowly missed out on the final in the live shows, coming 3rd.

==== Donna Marie Sludds ====
Donna Marie Sludds Donna Marie is a mum of 3, who gigs as a singer full-time. She started out singing years ago alongside her mum and dad. She is the most polished talent from Bláthnaid final 5, but Blathnaid feels her story will be accessible to loads of other working mums out there. She came second in the first live show, with a wildcard. She sparked controversy as she made it through to the final, as the rumored reason to be is, that Bláthnaid Ní Chofaigh didn't have an act in the final already.

==== Lauren Boylan ====
Lauren Boylan Lauren is 17. She sang 'Falling' by Glen Hansard from the film 'Once'. All of the panel agreed that the purity of her voice was a rarity. They also loved her modesty and humility. She couldn't believe that she had made it through to the final 5 and had convinced herself that another contestant had got through. Blathnaid wants to make sure that her natural talent isn't over produced. She just missed out on a place in the final, coming 3rd in the live shows.

==== 3rd World Records ====
3rd World Records 2 rappers, one from Lagos and one from Limerick. Their rap is 'soft rap' and aims to embrace all ages. They were neighbours who bumped into each other in the street, said hello, and took their talent from there. Advisor, Cormac Battle, couldn't believe that this rap duo had walked into their audition room. Blathnaid took a risk on them and was worried that the older generation might not get them. They came 5th in the series, thus leaving the competition.

=== Week five (The South) ===
The fifth episode was broadcast on 1 February 2009. It featured auditions from the South which saw John Creedon choose five acts to compete.

==== Barry Walsh ====
Barry Walsh' is a 19-year-old experimental guitarist from mallow County Cork. He began to teach himself how to play at the age of 13 and entered the show following his first public performance at his Leaving Certificate ceremony.

==== Jack Lynch ====
Jack Lynch, also known as B Boy Six, is a 6-year-old hip hop and freestyle dancer from County Waterford. He trains each day after school and all day Saturday and Sunday. Lynch placed second in the All-Ireland Hip Hop Championships in 2009. He came runner-up in the series behind winners The Mulkerrin Brothers.

==== Moneeka Murkerjee ====
Moneeka Murkerjee is a 13-year-old performer from Newmarket, County Cork. She performed a mix of contemporary dance and contortion at her audition. Murkegee attends classes twice a week in Tralee, County Kerry. Before entering The All Ireland Talent Show, Mukerjee took part in and won TG4 Irish language talent show Glas Vegas and earned herself a residency performing in Las Vegas in America.

==== Toby Bedell ====
Toby Bedell is a 37-year-old sales supply manager from County Waterford, who had been made redundant prior to his audition. He said losing his job had forced him to reassess his life and claimed he would not have entered the show if still employed. Bedell played "Last Request" by Paolo Nutini at his audition.

==== Vlada Fitzgerald ====
Vlada Fitzgerald is a 10-year-old pianist from County Cork. She has been playing piano since the age of four. She performed "La Poupee De Marcella" by Jennifer Linn. Fitzgerald says she is passionate about piano and music in general. She exited in week six.

== Live finals ==
=== Week six ===
The electric fiddler Daithí Ó Dronaí won the first live final in week six, airing on 8 February 2009. Donna Marie Sludds from the East was selected as the judges' wildcard entry after beating the Dublin dance act Raw Edge Crew. The other two acts to perform and exit were the Donegal Tenors and Vlada Fitzgerald.

North	South	East	West	Dublin
Donegal Tenors	Vlada Fitzgerald	Donna Marie Sludds	Daithí Ó Dronaí	Raw Edge Crew

=== Week seven ===
In week seven, the Mullkerrins got first spot while Moneeka Murkurjee got the judges wild card over Niamh McGlinchey. Elle n Elle came fourth and Holly Ann Traynor came third, despite praise from all judges.

North	South	East	West	Dublin
Niamh McGlinchey	Moneeka Murkerjee	Holly Ann Traynor	The Mulkerrin Brothers	Elle N Elle

=== Week eight ===
Dublin twins Bert & Victor O' Brien progressed from week eight, broadcast on 22 February 2009. They sang Iris" on their guitars. Lauren Murtagh performed a cover of The Zutons song "Valerie". Week eight's Wildcard entry was granted to operatic singer, Rachel Goode, whom Dana used her casting vote to send through instead of Murtagh.

North	East	Dublin	South	West
Rapture	Lauren Murtagh	Bert & Victor	Barry Walsh	Rachel Goode

=== Week nine ===
Jack Lynch was the winner, while The Rooneys won the wildcard over Lauren Boyhan.

North	East	Dublin	South	West
The Rooneys	Lauren Boyhan	Angela Mykolyuk	Jack Lynch a.k.a. B Boy 6	Lilac Blues

=== Week ten ===
Cliona Hagan, an opera singer representing the North, won week ten. Toby Bedell secured the Wildcard place after overcoming the father and daughter duo of Bernard and Eva Coyle. The dance group Genesis and rap act 3rd World Records were also losers.

North	East	Dublin	South	West
Cliona Hagan	3rd World Records	Genesis	Toby Bedell	Eva and Bernard Coyle

=== Final ===
The final took place on 15 March 2009. Celebrities to publicly wish the finalists well included ICE presenter Rob Ross and RTÉ 2fm DJ Cormac Battle. Ross said: "Good luck to everyone who is taking part in The All-Ireland Talent Show. You are all very talented so just your respective counties, your respective provinces proud." Battle advised: "This is it. It's not a dress rehearsal anymore. You've only got one chance to make a lasting impression and this is it, so go for it." Others interviewed for their thoughts on the final included ICE presenter Sinéad Kennedy and presenter of The Afternoon Show, Trevor Keegan. Shane Lynch's fellow members of Boyzone were present to support his act Bert & Victor, aside from Ronan Keating who was abstaining due to climbing Mount Kilimanjaro for Comic Relief. The Mulkerrin Brothers, mentored by Daithí Ó Sé of the West, won the series.

Dublin	North	West	East	South	West
Bert & Victor (performing "The Man Who Can't Be Moved")	Clíona Hagan (performing "You'll Never Walk Alone")	Daithí O Dronaí	Donna Marie Sludds (chosen wildcard)	Jack Lynch a.k.a. B Boy Six	The Mulkerrin Brothers

== Reaction ==
=== Viewing figures ===
It was claimed that over 500,000 people viewed the first episode which aired on 4 January 2009. The second show had over 600,000 viewers.

=== Reaction ===
John Boland of the Irish Independent pointed out that judge Shane Lynch loved almost everything he saw and heard but suspected that the producers had "simply gone out into the street and rounded up the first 30 people they came across". He was also intrigued that many of the chosen contestants were either black or East European.

Also DJ Jockey Joe Collins claimed that Bláthnaid Ní Chofaigh's judging skills were very poor. He pointed out that after sending an eleven-year-old home, why would she let through a seven-year-old?
