= The All Ireland Talent Show series 2 =

The All Ireland Talent Show
- Series 2
- Hosted by: Gráinne Seoige; Aidan Power; Dustin
- Judges: John Creedon; Shane Lynch; Bláthnaid Ní Chofaigh; Dáithí Ó Sé; Dana
- Winner: Chloe Coyle
- Runner-up: Na Fianna

Release
- Original network: RTÉ
- Original release: 31 December 2009 – 14 March 2010

Series chronology
- ← Previous; Series 1 Next → Series 3

The second series of The All Ireland Talent Show was announced on 10 August 2009. The winner was Chloe Coyle from Castlederg, County Tyrone, Northern Ireland. The second season was an extended one with more shows, seventeen in total.

It was scheduled to avoid competition with UK talent show The X Factor which airs on competing channels UTV and TV3.

== Personnel ==
=== Presenters ===
Gráinne Seoige returned as presenter in her only role on the channel following the scrapping of Seoige. Aidan Power and Dustin the Turkey started work on a new show, The All Ireland Talent Show Backstage. The show is based on spin-offs shows like The Xtra Factor and Britain's Got More Talent. This has ended Power's time as co-presenter of Winning Streak: Dream Ticket.

=== Judges ===
The judges are the same as the first series: Boyzone member Shane Lynch (Dublin), 1970 Eurovision Song Contest winner and conservative politician Dana (North), broadcaster John Creedon (South), television presenter and Irish language enthusiast Bláthnaid Ní Chofaigh (East) and television personality and weather forecaster Dáithí Ó Sé (West).

Judge Creedon has warned Dáithi O'Sé to stop stealing acts from Munster, alleging that he "invaded" County Clare in series one and that he would be "answerable to me and to my gang" if he continued to persist. Ní Chofaigh stated her hopes were for her act to win and "have a career". O'Sé has said about his fellow judges: "They're definitely trying to knock me off my perch".

Evelyn O'Rourke appeared as a replacement judge for the third live show after Shane Lynch's flight from London was delayed.

== Format ==
The second series was longer than the first, with eight acts in each of the five regions going to the Live Heats, and forty acts in the finals instead of twenty-five. The live shows began on 31 December 2009, and the final was broadcast live on 14 March 2010.

== Auditions ==
The first round of auditions in Dublin on 29 August 2009 saw 1,500 people take part. 49 of these made it through to be viewed by Shane Lynch. According to presenter Gráinne Seoige, "a lot more musicians and traditional bands turned up [in Dublin] than last year".

The second round of auditions took place in the North in Derry on 5 September 2009. Almost 1,000 acts auditioned in Derry, including country and western acts, tap and hip hop dancers, a mini Freddie Mercury and a 40 piece marching band.

The third round of auditions took place in the South in Cork on 12 September 2009. 1,500 people, including bands, traditional dancers and a collie who could drive, appeared at these auditions.

The fourth round of auditions took place in the West in NUI Galway on 19 September 2009. Auditionees included "family acts", magicians and sean-nós dance specialists.

The fifth round of auditions took place in the East in Kilkenny on 26 September 2009. These were the final round of auditions to take place.

== List of contestants ==
=== Week one (Dublin) ===
The first episode was broadcast on 29 August 2009. It featured the Dublin auditions which saw Shane Lynch choose eight acts to compete.
Final eight:
Ghetto Fabulous
Romey Farrelly
A Different Unique
Tumbleweed
Joanna Ryde & The Lads
Chris Geoghegan
Seán Taaffe
Fiona Hickey and Niall Kinsella

=== Week two (The North) ===
The second episode was broadcast on 5 September 2009. It featured auditions from the North which saw Dana Rosemary Scallon choose eight acts to compete.
Final eight:
Rachael McCauley
Karen Morrison
Cloughaneely Marching Band
Mark Adamson
Leonardo López Monreal
Chasin' Hooley
Chloe Coyle
Kailan McDermott

=== Week three (The South) ===
The third episode was broadcast on 12 September 2009. It featured auditions from the South which saw John Creedon choose eight acts to compete.
Final eight:
Michael Lawlor
Cathal Flaherty
Johnny "Bongos" Horgan
Bella Anam
Michelle Skehan
Ben Escorcio
Ghetto Grannies
Linda Fitzgerald

=== Week four (The West) ===
The fourth episode was broadcast on 19 September 2009. It featured auditions from the West which saw Dáithí Ó Sé choose eight acts to compete.
Final eight:
Stall the Digger
Tom & Eoghan Costello
Tara Burke-McDonnell
Emma O'Sullivan & John O'Halloron
Olwyn Murray
Naomi Fox
Laura May Lenehan
Tuam All-Star Gymnastics Club

=== Week five (The East) ===
The fifth episode was broadcast on 26 September 2009. It featured auditions from the East which saw Bláthnaid Ní Chofaigh choose eight acts to compete.
Final eight:
GoGoshKa Kinkladze
Ré-Seisiún
The Golden Sisters
Pyrotechnix
Na Fianna
Kathryn and Niall
Paul Powderly
David Lofts

== Live shows ==
=== The All-Ireland Talent Show Backstage ===
After the live shows Aidan Power and Dustin chat to the judges before the results to ask about how and why their acts got high or low scores. Then we see a clip of them talking to the acts before the acts performed. After that they talk to the acts live about where they are placing on the leaderboard and give them a chance to plead for votes. A clip would be shown of the two, most of the time spoofing Jedward. A "celebrity" guest would come into studio and talk about the acts and the judges' scores.

=== Results by region and judge ===
Region & Judge	Winner	Finalists	Semi-finalists	Wildcard round	Region population
West – Dáithí Ó Sé		2	4	0	504,000
North – Dana		1	1	1	2,017,000
South – John Creedon		2	2	1	1,173,000
East – Bláthnaid Ní Chofaigh		1	3	2	1,106,000
Dublin – Shane Lynch		0	0	4	1,186,000

=== Results by show ===
Show results are calculated as follows:

- Points out of five from judges.
  - Each judge (except for the act's own nominating judge) gives the act a mark out of 10. Thus, each act gets a mark out of 40.
  - The act which gets the highest mark out of 40 gets five points; the second gets four points, the third gets three points, the fourth gets two points and the act with the lowest mark gets one point.
- Points out of five from the public.
  - The act which gets the most telephone votes gets five points; the second gets four points, the third gets three points, the fourth gets two points and the act with the fewest telephone votes gets one point.

So each act receives a mark out of ten. The acts are then ranked from first to fifth (in the event of a tie on points, the act having more telephone votes is deemed to be ahead).

In the heats:

- First place advances to the semi-final round.
- Second and third place go before the judges. The three judges which did not choose either act vote on which should stay in.
  - The act with more votes from these three judges advances to the wildcard show.
  - The act with fewer votes from these three judges is eliminated.
- Fourth and fifth place are eliminated.

==== Live Heat 1 ====
Held on 31 December 2009.

Name	Act type	Judge & Region	Placing	Result
Michael Lawlor	Opera tenor	South – John Creedon	1st	Through to Semi-Final
Ghetto Fabulous	Hip-hop dance troupe	Dublin – Shane Lynch	2nd/3rd	Wildcard Show
Rachael McCauley	Country singer	North – Dana	2nd/3rd	Eliminated
Stall the Digger	Band	West – Dáithí Ó Sé	4th	Eliminated
GoGoshKa Kinkladze	Pianist	East – Bláthnaid Ní Chofaigh	5th	Eliminated

==== Live Heat 2 ====
Held on 3 January 2010.

Name	Act type	Judge & Region	Placing	Result
Ré-Seisiún	Traditional music band	East – Bláthnaid Ní Chofaigh	1st	Through to Semi-Final
Romey Farrelly	Singer	Dublin – Shane Lynch	2nd/3rd	Wildcard Show
Tom & Eoghan Costello	Marionette/dance act	West – Dáithí Ó Sé	2nd/3rd	Eliminated
Cathal Flaherty	Guitarist/singer	South – John Creedon	4th	Eliminated
Karen Morrison	Singer	North – Dana	5th	Eliminated

==== Live Heat 3 ====
Held on 10 January 2010. Radio presenter Evelyn O'Rourke took Shane Lynch's place as judge after his flight from London was delayed.Dáithí Ó Sé sparked controversy when he put through the Cloughaneely Marching Band as a wildcard instead of The Golden Sisters.

Name	Act type	Judge & Region	Placing	Result
Tara Burke-McDonnell	Sean-nós singer	West – Dáithí Ó Sé	1st	Through to Semi-Final
Cloughaneely Marching Band	Marching band	North – Dana	2nd/3rd	Wildcard Show
The Golden Sisters	Vocal trio	East – Bláthnaid Ní Chofaigh	2nd/3rd	Eliminated
Johnny "Bongos" Horgan	Percussionist	South – John Creedon	4th	Eliminated
A Different Unique	Comic duo	Dublin – Shane Lynch	5th	Eliminated

==== Live Heat 4 ====
Held on 17 January 2010. Shane Lynch returned as judge and sparked controversy when he gave Bella Anam a score of three.

Name	Act type	Judge & Region	Placing	Result
Emma O'Sullivan & John O'Halloron	Sean-nós dancer and accordion player	West – Dáithí Ó Sé	1st	Through to Semi-Final
Bella Anam	Singers	South – John Creedon	2nd/3rd	Wildcard Show
Pyrotechnix	Rock band	East – Bláthnaid Ní Chofaigh	2nd/3rd	Eliminated
Mark Adamson	Musical theatre singer	North – Dana	4th	Eliminated
Tumbleweed	Traditional band	Dublin – Shane Lynch	5th	Eliminated

==== Live Heat 5 ====
Held on 24 January 2010.

Name	Act type	Judge & Region	Placing	Result
Olwyn Murray	Singer	West – Dáithí Ó Sé	1st	Through to Semi-Final
Na Fianna	Ballad group	East – Bláthnaid Ní Chofaigh	2nd/3rd	Wildcard Show
Michelle Skehan	Singer	South – John Creedon	2nd/3rd	Eliminated
Leonardo López Monreal	Singer	North – Dana	4th	Eliminated
Joanna Ryde & The Lads	Comic act	Dublin – Shane Lynch	5th	Eliminated

==== Live Heat 6 ====
Held on 31 January 2010.

Name	Act type	Judge & Region	Placing	Result
Ben Escorcio	Singer	South – John Creedon	1st	Through to Semi-Final
Chris Geoghegan	Singer and guitarist	Dublin – Shane Lynch	2nd/3rd	Wildcard Show
Kathryn and Niall	Singer and guitarist	East – Bláthnaid Ní Chofaigh	2nd/3rd	Eliminated
Naomi Fox	Singer	West – Dáithí Ó Sé	4th	Eliminated
Chasin' Hooley	Folk band	North – Dana	5th	Eliminated

==== Live Heat 7 ====
Held on 7 February 2010.

Name	Act type	Judge & Region	Placing	Result
Chloe Coyle (winner)	Singer	North – Dana	1st	Through to Semi-Final
Seán Taaffe	Dancer	Dublin – Shane Lynch	2nd/3rd	Wildcard Show
Laura May Lenehan	Singer	West – Dáithí Ó Sé	2nd/3rd	Eliminated
Ghetto Grannies	Dancers	South – John Creedon	4th	Eliminated
Paul Powderly	Singer	East – Bláthnaid Ní Chofaigh	5th	Eliminated

==== Live Heat 8 ====
Held on 14 February 2010. David Lofts received 39/40 from the judges the highest score on the show so far.

Name	Act type	Judge & Region	Placing	Result
Tuam All-Star Gymnastics Club	Acrobatics	West – Dáithí Ó Sé	1st	Through to Semi-Final
David Lofts	Singer/guitarist	East – Bláthnaid Ní Chofaigh	2nd/3rd	Wildcard Show
Linda Fitzgerald	Singer	South-John Creedon	2nd/3rd	Eliminated
Kailan McDermott	Singer	North – Dana	4th	Eliminated
Fiona Hickey and Niall Kinsella	Singers	Dublin – Shane Lynch	5th	Eliminated

==== Wildcard Show ====
Name	Act type	Judge & Region	Placing	Result
David Lofts	Singer/guitarist	East – Bláthnaid Ní Chofaigh	1st	Through to Semi-Final
Na Fianna	Ballad group	East – Bláthnaid Ní Chofaigh	2nd	Through to Semi-Final
Cloughaneely Marching Band	Marching band	North – Dana	3rd	Eliminated
Romey Farrelly	Singer	Dublin – Shane Lynch	4th	Eliminated
Chris Geoghegan	Singer	Dublin - Shane Lynch	5th	Eliminated
Bella Anam	Singers	South – John Creedon	6th	Eliminated
Sean Taaffe	Ballet Dancer	Dublin – Shane Lynch	7th	Eliminated
Ghetto Fabulous	Hip-hop dance troupe	Dublin – Shane Lynch	8th	Eliminated

==== First semi-final ====
Took place on 28 February 2010.

Name	Act type	Judge & Region	Placing	Result
Na Fianna	Ballad group	East – Bláthnaid Ní Chofaigh	Top three	Through to final
Emma O'Sullivan & John O'Halloron	Sean-nós dancer and accordion player	West – Dáithí Ó Sé	Top three	Through to final
Michael Lawlor	Opera tenor	South – John Creedon	Top three	Through to final
Tara Burke-McDonnell	Sean-nós singer	West – Dáithí Ó Sé	Bottom two	Eliminated
Ré-Seisiún	Traditional music band	East – Bláthnaid Ní Chofaigh	Bottom two	Eliminated

==== Second semi-final ====
Held on 7 March 2010.

Name	Act type	Judge & Region	Placing	Result
Olwyn Murray	Singer	West – Dáithí Ó Sé	Top three	Through to final
Chloe Coyle	Singer	North – Dana	Top three	Through to final
Ben Escorcio	Singer	South – John Creedon	Top three	Through to final
David Lofts	Singer	East – Bláthnaid Ní Chofaigh	Bottom two	Eliminated
Tuam All-Star Gymnastics Club	Acrobatics	West – Dáithí Ó Sé	Bottom two	Eliminated

==== Final ====
Name	Act type	Judge & Region	Placing
Chloe Coyle	Singer	North – Dana	Winner
Na Fianna	Ballad group	East – Bláthnaid Ní Chofaigh	Runner-up
Emma O'Sullivan & John O'Halloron	Sean-nós dancer and accordion player	West – Dáithí Ó Sé	Third Place
Olwyn Murray	Singer	West – Dáithí Ó Sé	4th
Michael Lawlor	Opera tenor	South – John Creedon	5th
Ben Escorcio	Singer	South – John Creedon	6th

== Reception ==
The second series of The All Ireland Talent Show opened with 650,000 viewers, according to RTÉ director of television Noel Curran.
