= St Peter's College, Wexford =

St. Peter's College
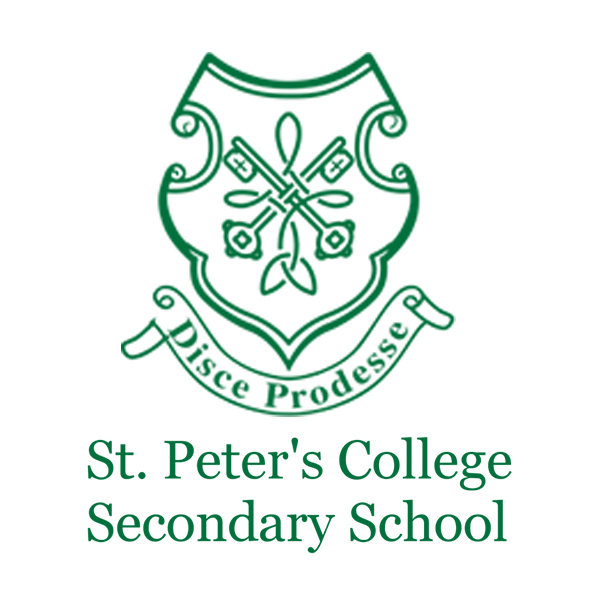

Location
- Summerhill, Wexford, County Wexford; Ireland; 52.3352°N 6.4733°W

Information
- School type: Secondary School; Diocesan College Public
- Motto: Disce Prodesse – Learn to be useful
- Religious affiliation: Christian
- Denomination: Roman Catholic
- Established: 1811; 215 years ago
- Founder: Rev. Patrick Ryan, Bishop of Ferns,
- Principal: John Banville
- Chaplain: Dcn. Fintan Fanning
- Teaching staff: over 80
- Gender: Male
- Age range: 12–19
- Colours: Green, White
- Sports: Hurling, Football, Basketball, Badminton, Golf, Equestrian, Handball, Soccer, Rugby
- Nickname: "Peter's" "The College" "Posh Lads"
- Rival: Good Counsel College New Ross
- Website: stpeterscollege.ie

St Peter's College, Wexford is an Irish secondary school and former seminary located in Summerhill, overlooking Wexford town. It is a single-sex school for male pupils. Currently, the school has over 800 students enrolled.

== History ==
Founded in 1811 by Most Rev. Patrick Ryan, Bishop of Ferns, the college began from a Roman Catholic seminary in Michael Street, Wexford, to the present buildings. In 1818, the large house at Summerhill was purchased and Bishop Ryan blessed the foundation stone of an extension to be constructed to the rear of the house. In 1819, Bishop James Keating opened the new college and the President, staff and student body of Michael Street took up residence. Rev. Miles Murphy was the first president, he went on to become a Bishop. Expansion occurred for years afterwards and the impressive façade with its distinctive tower and the chapel designed by Augustus Welby Pugin were constructed. In 1855 the college became affiliated to the Catholic University of Ireland, in 1858 a theology course was offered to students. Up until 1897 students went on to finish their Theology and Philosophy courses at St Patrick's College, Maynooth, (or another seminary), but from 1901 students completed their studies in St. Peter's and were ordained. Over 160 priests ordained for American dioceses were trained in St. Peter's.

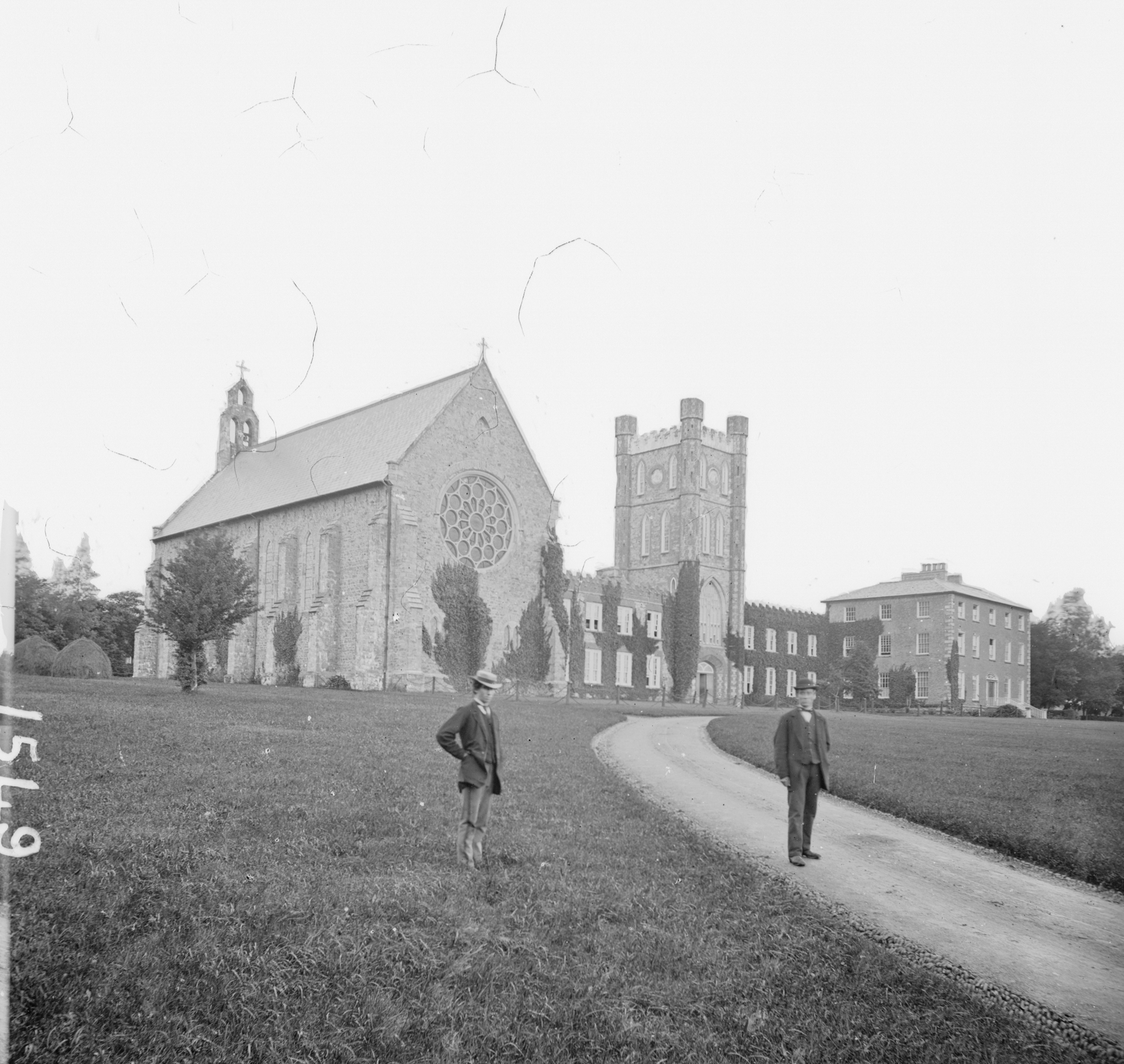
Photograph of St Peter's in the 1860s/70s

In 1938, due to increasing numbers of students, a seminary wing was added to facilitate expansion. This wing is now occupied by the Wexford Campus of Institute of Technology, Carlow. The Seminary closed in 1999 and the 10 remaining students for the priesthood transferred to other seminaries, and new construction work was completed in 2001. In 2009, a new building was completed, €3.5 Million, the building links the two older sections of the school and provides many specialist rooms such as CAD rooms and Physics Labs. In 1988 the Christian Media Trust, was set up in St. Peter's, with radio studios and production facilities; this is an interdenominational grouping including representatives from Wexford's Church of Ireland, Methodist and Presbyterian Churches. The group's programmes are broadcast on South East Radio on 95.6 FM. The building of the studio at St. Peter's was financed by Dr. Comiskey and the Ferns Diocese.

In 2005 the college featured prominently in The Ferns Report enquiry into paedophile activities in the Roman Catholic Church in the Diocese of Ferns.

== Syllabus ==
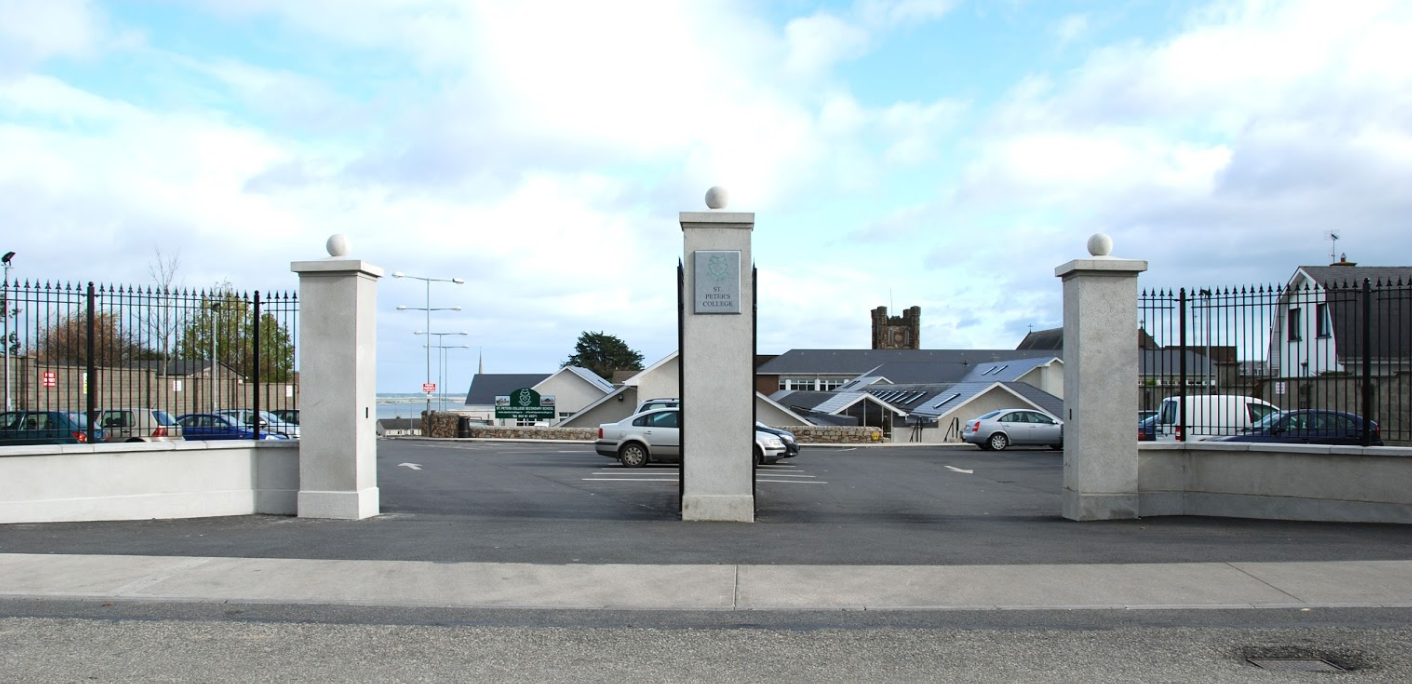
The main entrance to St. Peter's College

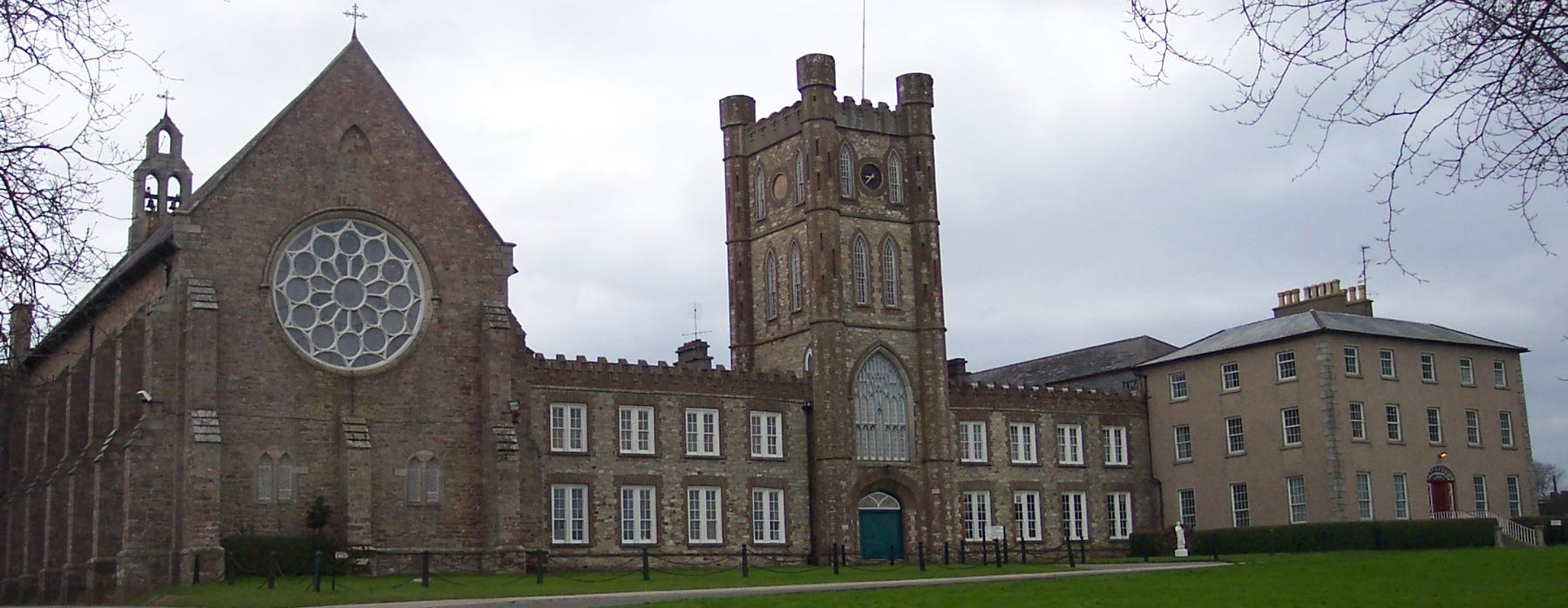
Outside the 'old' section of St. Peters College

The Junior certificate cycle subjects are: English, Irish, Mathematics, Geography, SPHE, History, Religion, Physical Education, Computer Studies & CSPE. The optional or 'choice' subjects are: French or German, Science, Technical Graphics, Material Technology (Wood), Music, Art & Business Studies.

St. Peter's also offer a Transition Year programme for students between Junior Certificate and Leaving Certificate cycles, which allows students to experience new subjects that are included in the Leaving Certificate as well as exclusive subjects purely for Transition Year.

The Leaving Certificate cycle include the mandatory Irish, English, Maths, Religion and P.E., and subjects chosen from Chemistry, Biology, Physics, Applied Maths, French, German, History, Geography, Accounting, Economics, Agricultural Science, Art, Music, Business, Technical Drawing and Construction Studies.

== Sport ==
In Gaelic games, the school won All Ireland finals in hurling in 1962, 1967, 1968 and 1973. Other successes include Leinster Hurling and Football championships. The college's more recent victories include the Senior Leinster A Football in 2017 and the Junior Leinster A Hurling 2007/8. The school has teams in basketball, handball and other sports. The school also won the Juvenile Leinster Football Final 2008/2009 and reached the final of the Juvenile Leinster Handball Final. In the GAA Centenary year of 1984 two students from the school won the All Ireland U15 Colleges Handball Doubles Final for the school at Croke Park.

== People Associated with St. Peter's College ==
=== Notable alumni ===
- John Banville – (b. 1945) novelist and screenwriter.
- Des Bishop – (b. 1975) Irish-American comedian
- Bishop Denis Brennan – (b. 1945) Bishop of Ferns, Wexford, 2006-2021.
- Bishop Abraham Brownrigg – (1836–1931), Catholic Bishop of Ossory, Kilkenny (1884–1928).
- Bishop Henry Cleary, O.B.E. – (1859–1929), Catholic Bishop of the Diocese of Auckland, New Zealand (1910–1929).
- Jamie Codd – jockey, finished second on Cause of Causes in the 2017 Grand National
- Prof. Arthur W. Conway FRS (1876–1950) Mathematical Physicist, President of University College Dublin (1940–1947).
- Bishop Aidan Deveraux DD (1801–1854), Vicars Apostolic of Cape of Good Hope (1847–1854), former pupil and Latin professor in St Peter's Wexford.
- Brian Deeny – (b. 2000), rugby union player
- Seán Fortune – (1954–1999) Catholic priest accused of child molestation.
- Cardinal Tomás Ó Fiaich – (1923–1990) Catholic Archbishop of Armagh (1977), Primate of All Ireland (1977), Cardinal (1979).
- Conor Firman – (b. 1998) hurler
- Daniel Furlong – (b. 1998) Winner of The All Ireland Talent Show, 2011.
- Bishop Thomas Grace – (1841–1921) Catholic Bishop of Sacramento, California (1896–1921).
- Neil Horan – (b. 1947) laicised Catholic priest, notorious for Grand Prix and Olympic marathon protests.
- Dr. James B. Kavanagh – (1800–1886), President of Carlow College (1864–1880).
- Archbishop Michael Kelly – (1850–1940) Catholic Archbishop of Sydney, Australia(1911–1940).
- Richard Malone - (b. 1990) artist and designer.
- Pat McCartan – (b. 1953) Irish Circuit Court judge, TD (1987–1992).
- Rory O'Connor – (b. 1998) hurler
- Chris O'Neill – (b. 1990), YouTuber.
- Archbishop Redmond Prendiville – (1900–1968) Catholic Archbishop of the Archdiocese of Perth, Australia (1935–1968).
- Dr. Patrick Prendergast MRIA – 44th Provost of Trinity College, Dublin, appointed 2011.
- Bishop James David Richards (1828–1893), Bishop of Port Elizabeth, South Africa (1871–1893)
- Shaunaka Rishi Das – (b. 1961) Founder of the Oxford Centre for Hindu Studies, Hindu cleric.
- James Ryan – (1891–1970) founder-member of the Irish Volunteers, MP (1918–1919), TD (1919–1965) and Government Minister for much of that time.
- Bishop Laurence Bonaventure Sheil – (1815–1872) Catholic Bishop of Adelaide, Australia (1866–1872).
- Nick Sheridan – (1991–2024) journalist and former presenter of News2day.
- Colm Tóibín – writer and critic.
- Bishop Dr. James Walshe – Bishop of Kildare and Leighlin (1856–1888), President of Carlow College (1850–1856).

=== Notable faculty ===
- Donal Collins (d. 2010) principal (1988–1991), jailed for indecent assault 1998
- Rory Jacob (b. 1983) hurler
- Brian Malone (b. 1986) dual-codes player
- Shane Roche, football player and manager

=== Former presidents/principals ===
The first president of St. Peters was Rev. Miles Murphy. He was succeeded in 1829 by Rev. John Sinnott DD. In 1850 after the death of Dr. Sinnott, Rev. Lawrence Kirwan was appointed president. In 1858, Rev Patrick C Sheridan took over the post of president; he was followed in 1873 by Dr Kavanagh. Very Rev. Luke (Canon) Doyle, served as president of St. Peter's College, from 1890 to 1895. More recent presidents have included Very Rev. William F. Murphy STL, Rev. Laurence O'Connor, Very Rev. Dr. Thomas Sherwood, and Fr. Seamus S. De Vál who has written about the college.

As of 2024, the Principal of St. Peter's College is Mr. John Banville.

== South East Technological University – Wexford Campus ==
The South East Technological University delivers courses at St. Peter's, in the former Seminary wing. There is approx. 900 students doing various full and part-time certificate, diploma, degree and masters courses in Business, Arts, Childhood studies, Visual Communications and Design, Sustainable Architectural Technology and Economics. 2012 saw the commencement of an MBA programme at the Wexford Campus.
