= Evelyn O'Rourke =

Irish broadcaster and journalist

- Born: 1971 or 1972 (age 53–54); Dublin, Ireland
- Education: Drama and English
- Alma mater: Trinity College Dublin (1990 – 1994)
- Occupations: RTÉ broadcaster and journalist
- Employer: RTÉ (1998–present)
- Spouse: John McMahon
- Children: 2

Evelyn O'Rourke (born 1972) is an Irish broadcaster and journalist employed by RTÉ. She is the current Arts and Media Correspondent for RTÉ News since February 2024.

O'Rourke joined RTÉ in 1998 as a researcher on The Gay Byrne Show and The Arts Show on RTÉ Radio 1 before moving on to become a roving reporter on Today with Pat Kenny on RTÉ Radio 1 and The Gerry Ryan Show on RTÉ 2fm. She has served as a presenter and reporter on several RTÉ programmes on radio and television, including Drivetime, Liveline and Morning Ireland, as well as an annual series on which she offers advice to Leaving Certificate students, Study Hub. She served as a reporter on Today with Sean O'Rourke and Claire Byrne from 2014 to 2024 and has co-presented the Irish Book Awards.

== Early life and education ==
O'Rourke was born in Dublin. She attended Coláiste Iosagáin in Dublin. Having completed her school studies she attended Trinity College Dublin to study Drama and English in 1990.

== Career ==
Upon graduation, O'Rourke moved to the west of Ireland to work in film and television. In 1998, she returned to Dublin, joining RTÉ Radio, working with the veteran broadcaster Gay Byrne during his final season on radio as a researcher. She was then transferred to The Arts Show with Mike Murphy, and later to Today with Pat Kenny, Ryan Tubridy's The Full Irish and The Gerry Ryan Show.

From 2008 to 2010, O'Rourke took on the role of radio reporter and television presenter for the RTÉ cross-media event Operation Transformation with Gerry Ryan.

O'Rourke presented Countdown to 306, a nightly one-hour exam preparation programme on RTÉ 2fm on the build up to the Junior and Leaving Certificate exams some years ago .

O'Rourke was a judge on the 10 January 2010 edition of series two of The All Ireland Talent Show after Shane Lynch's flight from London was cancelled, despite having given birth to her first son just six weeks earlier. She was also a judge on TG4 variety show Glas Vegas.

In 2014, O'Rourke wrote a best-selling memoir Dear Ross, which detailed her life following a cancer diagnosis while pregnant.

From 2021 to 2024, O'Rourke presented Study Hub, an annual Leaving Certificate programme and podcast series on RTÉ Radio 1.

O'Rourke has co-presented the Irish Book Awards on RTÉ One and reports on the Today programme, as well as presenting and reporting for the arts programme Arena on RTÉ Radio 1.

In a May 2021 documentary for TG4, O'Rourke explored the experiences of women who were diagnosed with cancer ten years on from her own cancer diagnosis in 2010.

On 29 February 2024, O'Rourke was announced as Sinéad Crowley's successor as Arts and Media Correspondent for RTÉ News.

In November 2024, O'Rourke was assigned by RTÉ News to report on Fianna Fáil leader Micheál Martin for the general election.

== Personal life ==
O'Rourke is a fluent Irish speaker. She is married to John McMahon, former head of RTÉ 2fm and current RTÉ executive producer. They have two sons.

On 2 December 2009 she gave birth to her first son. Her second son was born on 2 February 2011. O'Rourke was diagnosed with breast cancer during her second pregnancy.
