= Miracle Bell =

Irish musical group

- Origin: Naas, County Kildare, Ireland
- Genres: Electronic; Indie pop
- Years active: 2005 – 2011
- Label: MB Records
- Members: John Broe; John Rigney
- Past members: Tom Barrett; Dave Prendergast
- Website: Official

Miracle Bell are an Indie pop band from Naas, Ireland. Formed in 2005, the band is composed of John Broe (Guitar, lead vocals and Synth) and John Rigney(Drums, Percussion and Backing vocals).

== History ==
Miracle Bell formed in late 2005. Originally, they started as a rock covers band called When In Rome.

Singer Dave and guitarist John are first cousins. They have released one album in Ireland called Light Shape Sound, and have also released six singles. On 27 February 2011, Miracle Bell appeared on RTÉ on The All Ireland Talent Show, performing their single "Love Sounds".

On 17 November 2011, Dave Prendergast left Miracle Bell after six years with the band.

== Band members ==
- John Broe - Guitar, lead vocals & Synth
- John Rigney - Drums & Backing vocals

Former members

- Tom Barrett – Bass (2005–2010)
- Dave Prendergast - Lead Vocals, Rhythm Guitar & Synth (2005–2011)

== Discography ==
Miracle Bell discography
- Studio albums: One
- Extended plays: One
- Singles: Seven
- Music videos: Three

=== Studio albums ===
Year	Album details	Peak chart positions
Year	Album details	IRL
2010	Light Shape Sound: Released: 7 May 2010; Label: MB Records; Formats: CD, Download	68
"—" denotes a title that did not chart.

=== Extended plays ===
Year	Album details	Peak chart positions
Year	Album details	IRL
2007	Temperature Rise: Released: August 2007; Label: No Duck Records; Formats: CD	—
"—" denotes a title that did not chart.

=== Singles ===
Year	Title	Peak chart position	Album
Year	Title	IRL	Album
2008	"Inhale-Exhale"	—	Independent Singles
2009	"Who Took It All"	—	Independent Singles
2010	"Fit For Love"	—	Light Shape Sound
2010	"Love Sounds"	—	Light Shape Sound
2010	"Future Kings"	—	Light Shape Sound
2011	"Light Shape Sound"	—	Light Shape Sound
2011	"FlashBackHome"	—	
"—" denotes a title that did not chart.
