= No Béarla =

Irish language television programme

- Opening screenshot in front of Stephen's Green Shopping Centre, Dublin
- Created by: Manchán Magan
- Presented by: Manchán Magan
- Countries of origin: Ireland - both the Republic of Ireland and Northern Ireland
- No. of episodes: 8

Production
- Running time: Approx. 30 minutes

Original release
- Network: TG4
- Release: 7 January 2007 – 18 April 2008

No Béarla is a four-part documentary style programme broadcast on Irish language television channel TG4 and produced by Dearg Films RTÉ/TG4. It follows presenter Manchán Magan as he journeys throughout Ireland attempting to show that Irish is spoken only by a minority of the population.

The title is derived from the English negative "No" and the Irish word for the English language, Béarla. The theme tune is "Boulevard of Broken Dreams" by Green Day. The first series was originally broadcast on Sunday nights between 21:30 and 22:00, and repeated on Wednesday evenings between 19:30 and 20:00. It aired from 7 January until 28 January 2007. The second series was first broadcast on Fridays at 19:30, beginning on 28 March 2008.

== Series one ==
=== Episode 1 ===
Magan travels to Dublin, and his starting point in his search for Irish speakers is a map shop there.

=== Episode 2 ===
Manchán hopes for a better result.

In which Magan travels to Dundalk and Belfast.

When his car breaks down whilst leaving Dundalk, he finds he cannot find a mechanic as directory enquiry services simply laugh at him.

Whilst in Belfast, Magan attempts to find an Irish speaker on the Falls Road.

=== Episode 3 ===
In which Magan travels to Letterkenny and Galway.

In Letterkenny, Magan decides to try something he has never done before – bowling – and heads to Arena 7, where he encounters a helpful assistant. He then visits a pharmacy to buy condoms or coiscíní and goes out to a nightclub in a bid to "get lucky". After many unsuccessful attempts at asking girls to dance with him, he finally finds an Irish-speaking lady who is happy to oblige. Later that night, he calls a phone sex line, but the operator hangs up, not understanding him.

Later in Galway, he tries his hand at busking and, singing what he thinks to be the filthiest, most debauched lyrics he can think of to see if anyone will understand, old ladies smile and tap their feet merrily as he serenades them with filth.

=== Episode 4 ===
Manchán meets John Creedon in Cork.

In which Magan travels to Cork and Killarney.

Magan gets lost in the Crawford Art Gallery in Cork, while in Killarney he hunts for souvenirs and tests local knowledge of Irish by trying to recruit accomplices for a bank robbery.

In Cork, Magan first visits the English Market and, out on the streets, he meets RTÉ's John Creedon, an Irish speaker. He also attempts to get his hair cut but needs help from a fellow customer when the barber, who was educated in the United States and has never spoken Irish, does not understand him.

Whilst in Killarney, he successfully hires a bicycle and discovers he is only the second person to have spoken Irish in a souvenir shop (the first being Mícheál Ó Muircheartaigh, who walked by and said a few words).

At the conclusion Magan visits the grave of Peig Sayers and reads one of her passages aloud.

== Series two ==
The second series comprised a total of four episodes and aired on TG4 on Fridays at 19:30, beginning on 28 March 2008 and finishing on 18 April 2008. It was repeated on the following Sunday of each week at 20:00.

== See also ==
Manchán in his search of the final remnants of the Irish language in series one.

- List of programs broadcast by TG4
