= Winning Streak (Irish game show) =

- Genre: Game show
- Created by: RTÉ Studios
- Presented by: Mike Murphy (1990–2001); Derek Mooney (2001–08); Aidan Power (2008–09); Kathryn Thomas (2008–11); Marty Whelan (2009–2020); Síle Seoige (2010); John Creedon (2010); Geri Maye (2011–13); Brian Ormond (2011); Dáithí Ó Sé (2012–2014); Sinead Kennedy (2013–2020); Dermot Griffin (2013); Nuala Carey (2014); Others (unknown years)
- Composers: Andy O'Callaghan, John Walsh, Ray Harman, Simon Fine, others
- Country of origin: Ireland
- Original language: English

Production
- Production location: RTÉ Television Centre
- Running time: 60 minutes

Original release
- Network: RTÉ One
- Release: 21 September 1990 – 21 March 2020

Winning Streak is an Irish television game show that was produced for the National Lottery, and broadcast from 21 September 1990 to 21 March 2020 on RTÉ One. Produced in RTE's Studio 1 at their Television Centre in Dublin, the series featured contestants qualified via National Lottery scratchcards, who received the chance to win cash and other prizes. The climax of each episode featured one of the contestants receiving a chance to spin a wheel for a chance to win the programme's grand prize, which had escalated to one million Euro by the end of the series.

Winning Streak was RTÉ's flagship Saturday night show between early September and late May (however from 1990 until 1993 it was aired on Friday nights). The show brought consistently high ratings for the channel, often ranking among the top five in the ratings and at one point held the feat of being Europe's second longest-running game show (behind only Channel 4's Countdown). However, there was a significant drop in viewership during the 2008/2009 series.

The show first aired on 21 September 1990 with host Mike Murphy. In 2001, he was succeeded by Derek Mooney. Mooney stepped down as the show's host at the end of the 2007–08 season. The 2008–09 series was retooled as Winning Streak: Dream Ticket, with new co-hosts Kathryn Thomas and Aidan Power. They were the first duo to host the programme and Thomas was the show's first permanent female presenter. Aidan Power stood down after the 2008–09 series due to his commitments to The Cafe and The All Ireland Talent Show. Marty Whelan succeeded Aidan, co-hosting the 2009/10 series with Kathryn, which aired from 12 September 2009 until 29 May 2010. Kathryn was later replaced with Geri Maye, who presented alongside Whelan until 2013, when Sinéad Kennedy assumed the role of co-host.

Winning Streak was placed on hiatus in March 2020 as a result of the COVID-19 pandemic in the Republic of Ireland. In February 2023, it was confirmed that the show had been cancelled, although RTÉ remained open to a potential reboot in the future.

== Format ==
During each episode, five contestants played a series of chance-based minigames in order to win cash and prizes. Contestants were chosen from an on-air drawing of qualifying Winning Streak scratchcards from a tombola drum.

The specific games played varied across the programme's run, but each episode concluded with a competitive round (known in its final series as the "Wheel Reveal") to determine who would spin the big wheel for a chance at the programme's grand prize. In its latest form, each contestant stood at a podium with five numbered tubes—three of them concealing a wheel. A lottery machine (referred to as "the bubble") randomly selected one of the five contestants using a set of numbered balls (with two for each contestant), who then lifted one of their tubes to reveal its contents. In some eras of the programme, the contestants were given rounds of "free" picks from the spaces before the bubble was activated, and could also earn extra free picks as bonus prizes during the first half of the show.

The first contestant to reveal their three wheels advanced to the big wheel, which contains different segments each with their own prize value. When the wheel is spun, a ball bounces around, and the contestant wins whichever prize the ball rests on.

== History ==
=== Mike Murphy era (1990–2001) ===
The programme was initially presented by Mike Murphy. In its original format, the show began with the "Scratch Card Game", where each contestant got three "scratches" on their card, which won them cars, holidays or cash. This was followed by "Treasure Ireland", where contestants chose from six of Ireland's counties to reveal prizes. One county concealed the "Gold" space, which allowed the contestant to play the "Goldmine" game: a contestant sat before a table with 7 buttons on it. Six of them were worth increasing amounts of money, eventually building up to a final jackpot for getting all six. However, pressing the remaining button, "The Eliminator", ended the game.

This was then followed by the final "Win & Spin" game to determine who would spin the wheel. The contestants initially had to reveal four numbered spaces containing letters from the word "spin". This was later changed to only needing to find three spaces with the letters of the word "win". The jackpot on the big wheel was IR£250,000 (€317,434); the lowest cash prize was IR£10,000 (€12,697). Each time the jackpot wasn't won, another black IR£250,000 segment was added to the wheel the next week. For the 2000–01 series (Murphy's last), a new jackpot was added of IR£500,000 (€634,869), and a new segment added to the wheel. There were no additions made for this amount, but the IR£250,000 rule was still applied.

In later series, the opening game was now a car game, with contestants assigned a specific make of car, and winning said car if they pick a matching space from five options. Treasure Ireland now presented 16 counties, with some concealing cash and prizes as before, but some containing free picks for Spin & Win, and some containing minigames such as the Goldmine, the "Diamond Dilemma" (where the contestant chose from a set of "diamonds", and could either take a guaranteed IR£10,000 prize, or open the diamond to reveal a prize of up to IR£20,000), the "Compass" (a compass-themed wheel with cash prizes), or "Spin the Wheel" (where a contestant spun a wheel twice, winning the highest amount they land on). If unclaimed, Spin the Wheel is played automatically by the player who won the least in the round.

=== Derek Mooney era ===
==== 2001–2004 ====
In 2001, Murphy left RTÉ to pursue other ventures, and retired from presenting Winning Streak after the 2000–01 series. Derek Mooney became the new presenter of Winning Streak in September 2001, with the programme concurrently receiving a major visual and format revamp.

"Treasure Ireland" remained the opening round of the programme, which now featured the contestants picking Irish locations and landmarks to be visited by Streak—the programme's new animated robot mascot—for a chance to win cash and holidays, as well as collect "bonus wheels". At certain stages, contestants could use a "Lo" option to remove the selection with the smallest prize, or "No" to reject their selection and pick again. Contestants received one bonus wheel for free, and can collect up to three additional bonus wheels during Treasure Ireland. They are redeemed in the second round—"Cash 'Em or Keep 'Em"—to play a minigame awarding cash prizes, choosing from either the Diamond Dilemma (one wheel; worth up to €12,000), the "Ball Drum" (two wheels; contestants launched seven billiard balls numbered 6 to 15 into a swirling drum, and the contestant winning €1,000 multiplied by the value of the ball that finishes in the centre), or the Compass (three wheels, worth up to €25,000).

Also in this series, the "Phoneplay" game was introduced, where three home players (selected from players who entered using a code on the Winning Streak scratchcard were randomly selected to pick from one of three spaces; two contain cash prizes between €1,000 and €2,500, and the other contains the star prize of a new car.

Win & Spin was played almost identically to before (with three winning spaces, now denoted by wheel symbols hidden behind graphics of Streak), except that free picks were no longer given to each contestant before the bubble was activated, and leftover bonus wheels not redeemed in the previous round were turned into additional winning spaces. As this was seen as providing an unfair advantage in a game of chance, the bonus wheels were replaced later in the series by "Golden Euros", which could instead add bonus spaces to Win & Spin that awarded €10,000 cash when revealed. With the switch to the Euro currency, the wheel now contained a top prize of €500,000. If the contestant landed on the lowest €10,000 space, they now received a second spin that was also added to their total, which allowed a contestant to theoretically win up to €510,000.

In the 2003–04 series, the Diamond Dilemma game now cost two Golden Euros to play, and the Ball Drum was removed and replaced by "Roulette", which offered prizes from €3,000 to €10,000; the game cost a minimum of one Golden Euro, but contestants could spend additional Golden Euros to add additional balls, winning the total value of whatever spaces they land in. In the second half of the series, from January to June, all Golden Euros had to be used in Cash 'Em or Keep 'Em. That meant that players with just the one they started with played Roulette, two, Diamond Dilemma, and so on. The player got just two balls to play with in Roulette.

From September to December 2003, three additional players were drawn from the tombola each week to qualify for a New Year's Eve special, Winning Streak: Millionaire, where 48 contestants competed to win a grand prize of €1,000,000 won by Therese, A total of €1,613,000 has been won. During the second half of the series, contestants were similarly selected for a Fun in the Sun special, where contestants competed to win won a holiday home in Spain. In addition, "The Sliding Door Game" was played before Treasure Ireland, where contestants picked one of five 'sliding doors' on a board to win cash prizes.

==== 2004–2008 ====
For the 2004–05 series, the studio was updated to feature a touchscreen, which is now used for selected games (such as Treasure Ireland and the revived Goldmine). In The Sliding Door Game, now only 2 of the doors contain money. One has €5,000, the other has €6,000. Two of them allow the contestant that chooses them to play Diamond Dilemma. They are numbered 1 and 2 to determine who plays that game first. The final door lets that player play the Goldmine. In the second round, which now doesn't have a name. three cars are now also hidden amongst the cash prizes in the Diamond Dilemma, and the cheque value has now been reduced to €6,000. For each week a car isn't won, another is added to the game the next week. In the Goldmine, there are 7 "scuttles" on the screen, and the player gets two free attempts. From the third guess onwards, the Eliminator comes into play. If the player gets to the end without hitting it, they win a car. One player was drawn each week to go through to a special week-long series over the Christmas period, Winning Streak: Winner Takes All.

In 2005, a "Doubler" feature was added throughout the show (mirroring a similar feature on that series' scratchcards), with Doubler spaces in selected games allowing players to double their winnings. The contestant with the least amount of money at the end of the show gets their total doubled if the contestant who spins the wheel lands on one of 25 slots on the wheel with the Doubler symbol.

Winning Streak celebrated 15 years on air with the 2005–2006 series. The format was largely unchanged from the last series, and scratchcards still carried the Doubler for the first half of the series. From 31 December 2005—11 March 2006, Laura Woods served as guest presenter while Mooney hosted RTÉ's music competition You're a Star.

The Doubler feature was removed in 2006. There was now a car available in the Sliding Door Game, but it is no longer available in the Goldmine. Instead avoiding the Eliminator until the end wins the player an extra €25,000. Only one player now plays Diamond Dilemma. There are now 12 silver diamonds and 3 gold diamonds. The silver diamonds contain cash prizes between €3,000 and €10,000, plus one 'Extra'. If the player chose the 'Extra', then they get to choose one of the three gold diamonds, which contain prizes between €25,000 and €50,000. The cheque to walk away from the game with is now worth €7,500. On the wheel, the show returned to placing an additional €250,000 space to the wheel every time said prize was not won.

=== 2008–2020 ===
In 2008, Winning Streak underwent its second major revamp, with new co-presenters Kathryn Thomas and Aidan Power, and being retitled Winning Streak: Dream Ticket for this series. Contestants were now guaranteed at least €20,000 for their participation and one of those had a chance of winning €250,000.

A new series began on 12 September 2009, with Marty Whelan replacing Power (who then landed a job on The All Ireland Talent Show). Near the end of the season, the jackpot of €500,000 was won. Síle Seoige replaced Kathryn Thomas as co-presenter with Marty Whelan for the 16 January 2010 episode while Thomas was filming in Trinidad and Tobago. Marty also took time off for the Eurovision Song Contest, with guest presenters such as John Creedon, Brian Ormond, and Dáithí Ó Sé filling in for him.

On 21 December 2011, Geri Maye was announced as the new co-presenter, alongside Marty Whelan. She had previously presented the Dream Maker Wheel segment. She replaced Kathryn Thomas. She presented until the 2013–2014 season when Sinead Kennedy replaced her.

On 1 September 2012, the video introductions were axed. On 4 January 2014, for the first time ever, a new €1,000,000 slot was introduced on the wheel. On 18 October 2014, Nuala Carey stood in for Sinead Kennedy, who was celebrating her wedding. It was announced in December 2014 that the show would be moved to a "summer slot" instead of the usual autumn to spring slot from 2015 onwards. Instead Nicky Byrne would host The Million Euro Challenge. It was confirmed by Marty Whelan that Winning Streak would be back on RTÉ One on Saturday 20 June 2015 and would run each Saturday night throughout the summer. However The Million Euro Challenge"was axed after one series bringing Winning Streak back to its autumn-spring slot.

As the COVID-19 pandemic hit Ireland, Winning Streak was suspended on 21 March 2020, with RTÉ issuing a statement in January 2021 saying that Winning Streak would remain off-air for 'the foreseeable future'. In February 2022, reports emerged that the broadcaster were considering plans to reboot the show, but it was later confirmed that there were no plans to bring back Winning Streak following its hiatus. However, RTÉ did not rule out a modernized revival in the future.

Preceded by The Big Money Game	National Lottery summer game show on Telefís Éireann; 2014–present	Succeeded by Current
