= Creedon's Shannon =

Television series

Creedon's Shannon is a television series produced by RTÉ and presented by John Creedon. The series follows Creedon as he travels down the length of Ireland's largest river the Shannon while stopping along to way to showcase points of interest along the river. The show premiered on 23 July and aired one episode each week for three weeks after. Over the course of the series Creedon travels 360 km through 12 counties from the source of the Shannon to the Shannon estuary.

== Episode list ==
=== Episode 1 ===
The episode begins with Creedon trying to locate the true source of the Shannon. At the time of filming the source was considered to be the Shannon Pot in Co. Cavan as told by folklore though Creedon meets with hydrogeologists who perform a dye tracing experiment to find the true source of the river. Shannon Pot#Hydrology He then visits the Arigna Mines on the shores of Lough Allen, with former miner Maurice Cullen. Wildlife enthusiast Colin Stafford Johnson shows Creedon the natural sounds and local wildlife of the River Shannon. Pat McManus and his team of divers from the Athlone Sub Aqua club investigate an unknown ship lost to time on the lake bed of Lough Ree for many years.

=== Episode 2 ===
Creedon travels from Athlone to Killaloe. Using 3D technology he recreates the lost city of Clonmacnoise. He also learns that Anne Boelyn’s two nieces ended their days in Offaly’s Clonony Castle. Creedon then gets a special dispensation from the Revenue Commissioners to make poitin on Lough Derg and then follows the footsteps of High King Brian Boru in Killaloe.

=== Episode 3 ===
The final episode starts in ArdnaCrusha where Creedon descends the deepest lough in Europe in ArdnaCrusha's hydroelectric dam. Creedon then goes fishing with Pat Shortt, helps renovate a thatched cottage on Horse island and sails Cromwell’s route into Ballylongford, the home of poet Brendan Kennelly.

== Awards ==
'Creedon's Shannon' was nominated for an IFTA (Irish Film and Television Award) for best factual television show. The show won 'Best Broadcasting' at the 'Travel Extra Travel Journalist of the Year Awards'.

== Production ==
Filming of the voyage from start to finish took three months.

Production Team
Executive Producer	Janet Frawley	
Producers	Marie Toft	Mary Martin
Directors	Marie Toft	Mary Martin
Commissioning Editor	Colm Crowley	
