= Amanda Brunker =

Irish model and writer

Amanda Brunker (born 12 June 1974) is an Irish novelist, journalist and beauty pageant titleholder. She is columnist for the Irish Sunday World tabloid newspaper, She also won Miss Ireland 1991.

Brunker grew up in a Church of Ireland Protestant family in Finglas. After attending Mount Temple Comprehensive School she turned to modelling, entering and winning the Miss Ireland competition in 1991 when she was 17 years old.

== Career ==
She has continued modelling, acted in the film Head Rush, had a cameo role on the former Irish soap Glenroe, been a nightclub hostess and presented her own late night TV show The Dinner Party.

She also performed at Oxegen 2011. The decision to give her a prominent slot at the music festival ahead of artists who had released music, as well as her performance on the day, was widely criticised in the music press.

Brunker declined multiple offers from record companies to concentrate on her FETAC 4 course..

She was a judge on the third and final season of the All Ireland Talent Show, replacing Boyzone's Shane Lynch as the Dublin judge.

She published her first novel, entitled Champagne Kisses, on 25 June 2008, followed in June 2009 by a sequel, Champagne Babes.

She participated in season 4 of Celebrity Bainisteoir, managing Aughrim GAA Club, Wicklow.
