= Mulkerrin Brothers =

The Mulkerrin Brothers
- Origin: Aran Islands, Ireland
- Genres: Traditional
- Years active: 2008–present
- Members: Pádraig Mulkerrin; Éamonn Mulkerrin; Seán Mulkerrin

The Mulkerrin Brothers (often referred to as The Mulkerrins) are a trio of traditional Irish musicians and performers. The three are brothers, Pádraig Mulkerrin (b. 22 March 1994), Éamonn Mulkerrin and Seán Mulkerrin, who come from the Aran Islands.

They were winners of the first series of The All Ireland Talent Show in 2009. They appeared on television shows including Seoige, Keeping Up With The Kardashians,Tubridy Tonight following their win and gave a performance with Sinéad O'Connor in London. They announced a nationwide tour of Ireland in late 2009. In 2010 they were succeeded by Chloe Coyle as winner of second series of The All Ireland Talent Show.

== Style ==
The Mulkerrins are three brothers who come from Inis Mór, one of the Aran Islands. Their parents Martin and Bridie, were also born on the Aran Islands. Bridie lived in Wales, where she learned classical music, until she reached the age of sixteen. Her mother came from Cork. The Mulkerrin Brothers have a fourth brother, eight-year-old Máirtín, who does not perform with them and has little interest in music yet.

In March 2009, the three performing brothers ranged in age from nine to fourteen. Pádraig is fourteen years old, Éamonn is eleven-years-old and Seán is nine-years old. Seán attracted attention for his sean-nós dancing. Seán and Éamon play sport, both training in rugby at Carraroe, whilst Seán also plays Gaelic football on Inis Mór.

== History ==
=== The All Ireland Talent Show ===
The Mulkerrin Brothers took part in auditions for the RTÉ One television series The All Ireland Talent Show which were held at Galway-Mayo Institute of Technology (GMIT), County Galway on 22 November 2008. According to Pádraig, "We just entered to see what the hype was and mostly just to meet Jacksie from Killanscully [sic] and Daithí Ó Sé". They were chosen by mentor Daithí Ó Sé as one of his five acts to represent The West in the live finals which took place during February and March 2009, with their selection broadcast on the second episode on 11 January 2009. They progressed to the live final by winning the semi-final on 15 February 2009. They defeated the North's representative Niamh McGlinchey, the East's representative Holly Ann Traynor and Dublin's representative Elle N Elle, whilst the South's representative Moneeka Murkerjee progressed to the Wildcard selection but did not make the final herself.

During the final they competed against Dublin's representatives Bert & Victor, the North's representative Clíona Hagan, fellow representative of the West Daithí O Dronaí, wildcard selection representing the East Donna Marie Sluggs, and the South's representative Jack Lynch a.k.a. B Boy Six. The Mulkerrins performed last on the night and defeated runner up Jack Lynch to win the series. They won a prize of €50,000 following a vote by the general public.

=== Post-The All Ireland Talent Show ===
The Mulkerrin Brothers performed their winning piece on Seoige the following day. An appearance on Tubridy Tonight followed on 21 March 2009. Pádraig described their homecoming to Inis Mór as the highlight of the year: “Everybody from the island was on the pier to meet us and there was a big function in the local hall”.

They made their debut at a sold-out show in Ennis, County Clare. They have also performed alongside Sinéad O'Connor in London, UK. A nationwide tour has been launched. A debut album is being recorded. They will feature in a documentary which will air on Christmas Day.

As of 2022, Sean Mulkerrin has embarked on a Gaelic football career, and plays for Aran Islands GAA, and the Galway county football team.
