= James B. Kavanagh =

Irish priest (1800–1866)

James B. Kavanagh (1800 – 5 October 1886) was an Irish priest, teacher and President of St. Patrick's College, Carlow from 1864 to December 1880.

== Biography ==
He was born in 1800 to Jeremiah Kavanagh of Killballyowne, County Wicklow and Mary Kavanagh. He was educated, firstly, at St Peter's College, Wexford, then at Maynooth College.

He was appointed Professor of Rhetoric at Carlow College in 1850 left briefly in 1853 returning in 1854 as Dean of the Ecclesiastical College and Professor of Moral Philosophy. In 1856 Professor of Natural Philosophy(lecturing in Chemistry and Chemical Physics) in 1857. In 1862 he became Vice-President and Professor of Theology. He was appointed President in 1864 and served until December 1880 when he was appointed parish priest in Kildare succeeding Rev. Nolan.

He is noted for publishing a number of lectures on Natural Philosophy. He is also noted for his response to Gladstone's attacks on the Vatican following the Vatican Council 1869.

In 1884, he was responsible for the De La Salle Brothers opening a boys school in Kildare.

On 5 October 1886, he was killed by a small marble statue which fell from the high altar just as he had said Mass, in St. Brigid's Church where he was Parish priest at the time where he is buried. His Life and death was written about in "stricken down at the altar" Rev. Dr. James B. Kavanagh, P.P. Kildare by Peadar MacSuibhne, Rector of Knockbeg College.

== Publications ==
- Comets and Meteors: A Lecture Very Rev. Dr. James B. Kavanagh, president Carlow College (Dollard 1877).
- Solar Physics: A Lecture Very Rev. Dr. James B. Kavanagh, president Carlow College (Dollard 1877).
- A reply to Mr. Gladstone's "Vaticanism" by Very Rev. James Kavanagh, D.D., President of Carlow College, The Irish Monthly, Vol. III, pp. 362–363, May, 1875
