= The All Ireland Talent Show =

Irish television series

- Genre: Talent show
- Created by: Tyrone Productions; Simon Cowell
- Directed by: John FD Northover
- Presented by: Gráinne Seoige
- Judges: John Creedon; Bláthnaid Ní Chofaigh; Dana; Dáithí Ó Sé; Shane Lynch (2009–10); Amanda Brunker (2011)
- Country of origin: Ireland
- Original language: English
- No. of seasons: 3
- No. of episodes: 45

Production
- Producer: Noleen Golding
- Production location: Ardmore Studios
- Running time: 30–60 minutes (inc. adverts)

Original release
- Network: RTÉ One
- Release: 4 January 2009 – 27 March 2011

Related
- Ireland's Got Talent

The All Ireland Talent Show is a Raidió Teilifís Éireann television series which was billed as Ireland's biggest-ever talent contest. It was first announced in November 2008 and the first series commenced broadcasting on 4 January 2009, completing on 15 March 2009. Modelled on Got Talent, it is produced by Tyrone Productions. Airing on RTÉ One, it was hosted by Gráinne Seoige.

Five judges take part and each regional judge, with the assistance of two other personalities who then disappear from the show, select five acts to be put forward to the live studio heats. In the second season this was changed to eight acts. Louis Walsh was approached to act as a judge before series one but refused to commit. On the opening night of series one, The All Ireland Talent Show had over 500,000 viewers, with Ireland only having a population of over 4 million people. (Note: Ireland is an island consisting of 32 counties, and the population of Ireland as a whole is estimated to be 6.2 million. however, the viewing figures only relate to the 26 counties of the Republic.) The opening is similar to the Got Talent series. The twenty-five finalists in series one competed for a first prize of €50,000, which was eventually won by the Mulkerrin Brothers of the Aran Islands.

A second series was announced in August 2009. It was scheduled to avoid competition with UK talent show The X Factor which airs on competing channels ITV and Virgin Media One, and BBC One's Strictly Come Dancing. The series was also extended with the addition of eight heats, a wildcard show and two semi-finals. There was also the addition of The All Ireland Talent Show Backstage, a companion show presented by Aidan Power and Dustin the Turkey. Series 2 was won by County Tyrone's Chloe Coyle.

A third series was announced in August 2010. The winner of the third series was Daniel Furlong from Wexford. Furlong was the third child act to win the series.

The series was axed in July 2011 and replaced by The Voice of Ireland, based on the hit Dutch TV series The Voice of Holland.

== Format ==
There were 5 stages to The All Ireland Talent competition:

- Stage 1: Auditions
- Stage 2: Live shows
- Stage 3: Wild card show*
- Stage 4: First semi-final and second semi-final*
- Stage 5: Final
- This round was not included in series 1.*

=== Auditions ===
The auditions took place in the North, the South, the West, the East and Dublin. Where an act auditions in front of their mentor and their selected advisors. Their mentor decided whether or not to put them through to the call-backs. At the start of the call-backs the mentor, with the help of their advisors, decides on the final 16 acts (final 10 in series 1). The advisors then leave and the mentor judges the rest of the call backs alone. The final 16 acts come back and perform again. They also give their reasons for why they should be put through to the live shows. The mentor then selects their final eight (final five in series 1) acts to put through to the live shows.

=== Live heats ===
For the first eight (five in series 1) weeks, 5 acts performed representing each judge. After they performed each judge (except the acts mentor), gives the act a score out of ten. At the end of the show the act with the most votes got five points, and the next highest scoring act one point less. This system was applied to the televotes. The two scores were then added (in the event of a tie, the act with the more tele-votes takes higher ranking). The act who places first on the leaderboard makes it through to the semi-finals. (In season one this round was the semi-finals, so the act who placed first made it through to the final.) From the 2nd and 3rd placed acts there was a chance for one of them to become a wildcard. The three remaining judges vote on who deserves the wildcard. In season one from the wildcards picked the judges chose which one should progress through to the final, from season two this was decided in the wildcard show.

=== Wild card show ===
All the wild cards return and perform. This time the judges have no power over the final result and this decision is in the hands of the public. The acts who place first and second advance to the semi-finals, while the other acts are eliminated.

=== Semi-finals ===
There are two semi finals. In each semi-final 5 acts perform and the judges again have no control over the vote. The top three acts in each semi-final advance to the final while the bottom two are eliminated. This round worked the same as the live heats in season one, and was the first round of the live shows.

=== Final ===
The six acts return and perform again. The act who comes first wins the show and the prize of €50,000. However, in season 3 there was a twist. Each act performed once and the lines were frozen at the start of the results show. The three acts with the most votes performed again for the title while the three with the lowest votes were eliminated. The lines were then re-opened and the votes cast earlier carried forward. After the top three have performed again, the lines are closed and the act with the most votes is announced as the winner.

== Series summary ==
To date, three series have been broadcast, as summarised below.

– Contestant from "south"
– Contestant from "west"
– Contestant from "east"
– Contestant from "north"
– Contestant from "Dublin"

Series	Winner	Runner-up	Third place
One	Mulkerrin Brothers	Jack Lynch	Bert & Victor
Two	Chloe Coyle	Na Fianna	Emma O'Sullivan & John O'Halloron
Three	Daniel Furlong	Don Stiff	Mad For Road

=== Series 1 ===
During series one, Shane Lynch expressed his concern over the tactical voting of other judges, saying that he felt some of them were deciding upon their marks in what he viewed as an incorrect way. "It's going to affect me, don't get me wrong, it has affected me in fact", he told RTÉ.ie. Referring to the elimination of his dance act Raw Edge Crew, Lynch commented: "They should have done it (progressed)... and there was tactical voting involved". Bláthnaid Ní Chofaigh described herself as the "most honest" judge. Judge Dáithí also reported his dissatisfaction with his fellow judges. Judge Creedon reported his dissatisfaction with Judge Dáithí after the series.

=== Series 2 ===
A second series of The All Ireland Talent Show was announced on 10 August 2009. Aidan Power presented a companion show called The All Ireland Talent Show Backstage with Dustin the turkey to which Aidan ended his career as co-presenter of Winning Streak: Dream Ticket. Gráinne Seoige returned as presenter in her only role on the channel following the scrapping of Seoige. The second season of The All Ireland Talent Show will be an extended one with more shows. Judge Creedon has warned Dáithi Ó Sé to stop stealing acts from Munster, alleging that he invaded County Clare in series one and that he would be "answerable to me and to my gang" if he continued to persist.

=== Series 3 ===
A third season was announced in August 2010. However, Boyzone singer Shane Lynch announced his departure from the show due to touring and he was replaced by Amanda Brunker, although he was Amanda's assistant judge at the Dublin auditions. The winner was Daniel Furlong, who was one of the wild cards.

Series 3 was the final series. In July 2011, the show was axed.

== Judges and presenters ==
Season	Host	Judges				
1	Gráinne Seoige	John Creedon	Bláthnaid Ní Chofaigh	Dana	Dáithí Ó Sé	Shane Lynch
2	Gráinne Seoige	John Creedon	Bláthnaid Ní Chofaigh	Dana	Dáithí Ó Sé	Shane Lynch
3	Gráinne Seoige	John Creedon	Bláthnaid Ní Chofaigh	Dana	Dáithí Ó Sé	Amanda Brunker

=== Judges ===
From series 1 and 2, The All Ireland Talent Show the judges were broadcaster John Creedon (South), Boyzone member Shane Lynch (Dublin), television personality and weather forecaster Dáithí Ó Sé (West), 1970 Eurovision Song Contest winner and conservative politician Dana Rosemary Scallon (North) and television presenter and Irish language enthusiast Bláthnaid Ní Chofaigh (East). In Series Two Evelyn O'Rourke appeared as a replacement judge for the fourth live show after Shane Lynch's flight from London was delayed.

Shane Lynch left the show for the third series. Amanda Brunker became the new head judge. Lynch, however, served as one of Brunker's assistant judges during the Dublin auditions.

=== Presenters and other personnel ===
Gráinne Seoige is the current presenter on the show. Aidan Power and Dustin the turkey are the current presenters on The All Ireland Talent Show Backstage.

=== Finalists ===
– Winning judge/category. Winners are in bold italics.

Series	Dáithí Ó Sé West	Shane Lynch Dublin	Bláthnaid Ní Chofaigh East	John Creedon South	Dana North
One	- **The Mullkerrins**; - Daithí Ó Drónaí; - Rachel Goode; - Eva and Bernard Coyle; - Lilac Blues	- Bert and Victor; - Angela Mykolyuk; - Elle N Elle; - Genesis; - Raw Edge Crew	- Donna Marie Sludds; - Lauren Boylan; - Holly Ann Traynor; - Lauren Murtagh; - 3rd World Records	- Jack Lynch; - Barry Walsh; - Moneeka Murkerjee; - Toby Bedell; - Vlada Fitzgerald	- Clíona Hagan; - The Rooneys; - Niamh McGlinchey; - Rapture; - Donegal Tenors
Two	- Emma & John; - Olwyn Murray; - Tara Burke-McDonnell; - Tuam Gymnastics Club; - Laura May Lenehan; - Tom & Eoghan; - Naomi Fox; - Stall the Digger	- Ghetto Fabulous; - Romey Farrelly; - A Different Unique; - Tumbleweed; - Joanna Ryde; - Seán Taaffe; - Fiona Hickey and Niall Kinsella; - Chris Geoghegan	- Na Fianna; - David Lofts; - Ré-Seisiún; - Kathryn and Niall; - Pyrotechnix; - The Golden Sisters; - GoGoshKa; - Paul Powderly	- Michael Lawlor; - Ben Escorcio; - Bella Anam; - Linda Fitzgerald; - Michelle Skehan; - Cathal Flaherty; - Johnny Bongos; - Ghetto Grannies	- **Chloe Coyle**; - Cloughaneely Marching Band; - Rachael McCauley; - Mark Adamson; - Leonardo López Monreal; - Kailan McDermott; - Karen Morrison; - Chasin' Hooley
Series	Dáithí Ó Sé West	Amanda Brunker Dublin	Bláthnaid Ní Chofaigh East	John Creedon South	Dana North
Three	- Don Stiffe; - Cosa Beoga; - Sean Nós ar an tSionnan; - Politically Correct; - Karate Pencil Case; - Richard Cunningham; - Aoife and Paul Moroney; - Jacks Angels	- Shauna Buckingham; - Wallis; - Kyle Kennedy; - Anthony White; - Owen Gerrard; - Must Try D'N'D; - Síle Keogh; - Dan Dennehy	- **Daniel Furlong**; - Claire Mulholland; - Jackson 3; - Lil' Dukebox; - The Myth; - Arlene Caffrey; - Feverfelt; - Bernadette Spain	- Mad for Road; - 2 Day Nation; - Fitzy Chicks; - Shane Doonan; - Daragh Merritt; - Séamus & Tomás; - Johnny Mack; - Halo	- Brian Sheerin; - Virginia Gospel Choir; - Jim Devine; - Áine Hassin; - Louise Florence; - Fox 'N' Crew; - Maggie Ferris; - The Ward Sisters

== Winners ==
- Series 1: The Mulkierrin Brothers- West
- Series 2: Chloe Coyle- North
- Series 3: Daniel Furlong-East

== The All Ireland Talent Show Backstage ==
The All Ireland Talent Show
- Genre: Talent show
- Created by: Tyrone Productions
- Presented by: Aidan Power; Dustin
- Country of origin: Ireland
- No. of seasons: 2

Production
- Production location: Ardmore Studios
- Running time: 30 mins

Original release
- Network: RTÉ Two
- Release: January 2010 – March 2011

The All Ireland Talent Show Backstage is a companion show that airs on RTÉ Two from season two on Sunday at 7:30 after the main RTÉ One show.

The show was presented by Aidan Power and Dustin the Turkey. At the start of the show Power and Dustin talk to the judges about the comments/scores they gave and the comments/scores their act were given. A clip would be shown of Power and Dustin talking to the acts earlier that day before the show started. After the clip of the acts before performing they would talk to the acts live about their placing on the leaderboard and give them a chance to plead for votes. A comedy clip would follow, often of Dustin and Power spoofing Jedward. However, in the 2010–2011 season, sometimes the clip would be an interview with a "celebrity" guest: as the clip was pre-recorded the performances by the acts during the RTÉ One show would not be discussed. A "celebrity" guest would come live into studio and talk about the acts and the judges scores.

== See also ==
- Class Act
- Fame: The Musical
- Popstars
- You're a Star
