= Nuala Carey =

Irish weather presenter

- Born: 22 December 1977 (age 48)
- Education: University College Dublin
- Occupation: Weather presenter
- Employer: Raidió Teilifís Éireann
- Known for: Weather presentation Lotto

Nuala Carey (born 22 December 1977) is an Irish full-time weather presenter on Raidió Teilifís Éireann (RTÉ).

Carey was educated at Muckross Park College, Dublin and graduated from University College Dublin (UCD) with a Bachelor of Arts in English and Sociology. After graduating from UCD she worked on AA Roadwatch, which involved presenting traffic reports on the radio. She moved to Dublin City FM where she presented and produced a number of shows and she also presented Holiday Roadwatch on TV. Carey joined RTÉ in March 1999.

In addition to presenting the weather, Carey presents the National Lottery's Telly Bingo on RTÉ One and the National Lottery's Lotto draws on the same station. In 2007, Carey took part in Charity You're a Star, finishing third, while in 2010 she participated in Celebrity Bainisteoir, coaching Shannonbridge GAA team from County Offaly.

In early 2009, Carey launched a nationwide search to find herself a partner on RTÉ Radio 1's Mooney.
