= Daniel Furlong =

Irish singer (born 1998)

- Born: 3 January 1998 (age 27)
- Origin: Wexford, Ireland
- Occupation: Singer
- Instrument(s): Vocals, guitar
- Years active: 2010–present

Daniel Furlong (born 3 January 1998) is an Irish singer. He is known for winning the third series of The All Ireland Talent Show. He was also the first wildcard to win the show, the first to win for The East and subsequently, the last winner of the show before its cancellation. He has been a member of the Irish band Celtic Thunder.

== Career ==
=== The All Ireland Talent Show ===
Furlong took part in auditions for the RTÉ One television series The All Ireland Talent Show. He was chosen by mentor Bláthnaid Ní Chofaigh as one of her eight acts to represent the East in the live finals which took place during February and March 2011.

Furlong fought for a place in the semi-finals in the 7th heat on 13 February 2011. He scored a score of 35. He beat Halo from the South and Must Try D'n'D from Dublin, before losing out to Politically Correct. He was then picked as a wildcard by the judges.

In the wildcard heat, Furlong beat Daragh Merritt, Wallis, Shane Doonan, Claire Mulholland, Karate Pencil Case and Virginia Gospel Choir. Daniel and Shauna Buckingham were top 2 and got a place in the semi-finals.

In the second semi-final, he beat 2 Day Nation and Politically Correct. He came second behind Mad for Road. He also beat Sean Nós ar an tSionann who came third. The top three acts in the semi-finals made the final.

In the final, Daniel beat Sean Nós ar an tSionann, Brian Sheerin and Cosa Beoga, getting a place in the top 3 and performing again. He then beat Mad for Road who had 69,008 votes and Don Stiffe who had 79,984 votes.

His first album, Voice of an Angel, was released on 29 November 2011 by MRP.

=== Celtic Thunder ===
Daniel Furlong joined the group after Damian McGinty left. Furlong, unlike McGinty when he had joined the group, is a soprano. He holds the title of being the youngest current Celtic Thunder member, even though he was a guest member of the singing group.

== Discography ==
- 2011: Voice of an Angel
