= Aidan Power =

Irish television and radio presenter (born 1979)

- Born: 30 March 1979 (age 47); Templeogue, Dublin, Ireland
- Occupation: Presenter

Aidan Power (born 30 March 1979) is an Irish television and radio presenter.

== Career ==
Born in Templeogue, Dublin, Power was educated at St. Mac Dara's community college and then Ballyfermot Senior College where he obtained a diploma in broadcasting and journalism in 1998. He began his career as a DJ and presented West Dublin Community Radio alongside reporting for RTÉ's daytime show 12-2-1. Aidan gained his radio presenting experience on the pirate Freedom FM.

Subsequently, Power worked as a presenter on a variety of shows such as Open House and The Den. In 2003, he left RTÉ and joined Nickelodeon as anchor presenter on their daily show NickL8R, but he left this show in 2004 to concentrate on co-presenting The Cafe with Laura Woods until October 2008 when he became the show's sole presenter. In September 2005, he became the face of TTV until July 2007. In September 2007, he co-presented one series of Class Act with Síle Seoige. He hosted Celebrities Go Wild with Anna Nolan in October 2007 In September 2008, he began co-presenting Winning Streak: Dream Ticket with Kathryn Thomas. He quit Winning Streak: Dream Ticket in 2009 to present behind-the-scenes show The All Ireland Talent Show Backstage.

In 2010, he started presenting SuperCrew on TRTÉ, and he began working on Celebrity Bainisteoir. He also presented the 98fm Morning Crew show with Clare Solan until the end of September 2012, after which he was replaced by Ray Foley.

Power presented Superbloopers with Zig and Zag on RTÉ over the 2011 Christmas season, and again during 2012.

On 13 April 2013 Power presented Sligo Rovers versus Cork City in a high-profile league of Ireland game.

Power co-hosted the only series of the Irish songwriting competition, The Hit with Nicky Byrne.

Aidan formerly presented Dublin 98FM’s former weekday breakfast show from August 2010-September 2012 alongside Claire Solan.

On 2 February 2016, iRadio announced that Power would present their new breakfast show. Power replaced Steven Cooper who left to present 98fm's breakfast show alongside former iRadio presenter Luke O'Faolain, the same show which Power left in 2012.

In 2019 Power had presented boxing on UK Channel 5Spike TV.

Power left iRadio in May 2021. Steven Cooper replaced Power when he left iRadio.

He joined the team of Weekend AM on Virgin Media Television in 2019. Weekend AM was dropped by the broadcaster in 2019 having started in. From later in 2019-2021 Aidan then co- presented the newly launched weekend versions of Ireland AM alongside Anna Daly, Laura Woods and Simon Delaney - who have all since left the broadcaster.

In 2021 and 2022, Aidan returned to Freedom FM. Since 2022, Aidan has prestened his breakfast show on the station called Breakfast with Aidan Wednesday-Friday morning from 7-10.

=== Notable incident ===
Power was surprised on 23 October 2008 when wrestling superstars Joe Legend and Scotty 2 Hotty came in to talk about the wrestling events around Ireland but in a strange turn of events ended up taking on Power and trashing the Cafe. Power later admitted this was the highlight of his broadcasting career.
