= Majella O'Donnell =

Irish singer

- Born: Majella Roche; 14 April 1960 (age 66)
- Occupations: Singer, businesswoman, charity campaigner
- Spouses: Raymond McLennan (annulled) Daniel O'Donnell (m. 2002)

Majella O'Donnell (born Majella Roche, 14 April 1960) is an Irish singer, businesswoman and charity campaigner from Thurles, County Tipperary. She came to public attention upon her engagement to singer Daniel O'Donnell. A survivor of cancer, she has raised money for the Irish Cancer Society.

== Early life ==
O'Donnell is the daughter of Tom and Marion Roche, and was raised in Thurles, County Tipperary. Her parents owned a bar in Tenerife.

Her marriage to her first husband, Raymond McLennan, was annulled. They had two children together. She went by her married name, Majella McLennan, until her second marriage.

She met singer Daniel O'Donnell in September 1999 in Tenerife. They married on 4 November 2002.

== Career ==
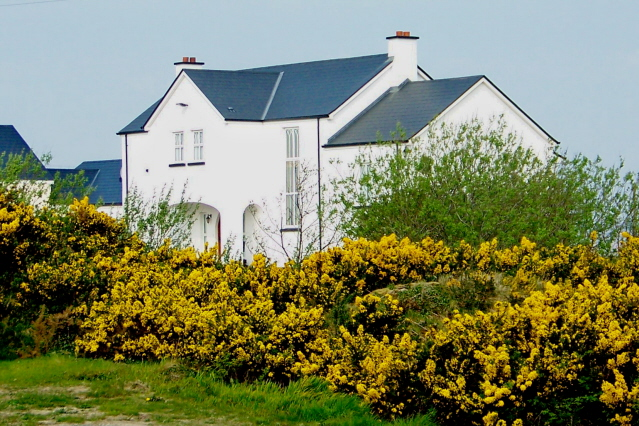
O'Donnell's home in Meenbanad, County Donegal

In 2015, O'Donnell and her husband produced Daniel and Majella's B&B Road Trip, a travel series for RTÉ. She has appeared as a guest on The Late Late Show, on RTÉ One, Loose Women on ITV1, and Angela Scanlon's Ask Me Anything on RTÉ 2. O'Donnell has release two albums, At Last in 2006 and ...By Request in 2010. She performed a duet with Daniel on his PBS special "Can You Feel The Love". According to her husband, O'Donnell has been approached to compete in Dancing with the Stars.

Active on Twitter, O'Donnell spoke against the actions of Eamonn Holmes following the resignation of Phillip Schofield from ITV, and the publicity around the unfounded investigation into family friend Cliff Richard.

== Cancer diagnosis ==
In 2013 O'Donnell announced that she was battling breast cancer. In the week she commenced chemotherapy, she had her head shaved live on The Late Late Show as a fundraiser for the Irish Cancer Society, raising over €350,000. She underwent a double mastectomy.

== Personal life ==
O'Donnell and her husband live in Meenbannad, County Donegal, and spend time at their second home in Tenerife.

She has three grandchildren.

O'Donnell has spoken of her issues with depression, and of art as a way of coping when overwhelmed.

== Discography ==
- At Last 2006
- ...By Request 2010

== Bibliography ==
- O'Donnell, Majella (2015). It's All in the Head, 2015. Simon & Schuster UK. ISBN 978-1471138959.
