= Bláthnaid Ní Chofaigh =

Irish TV presenter and Gaeilgeoir (born 1970)

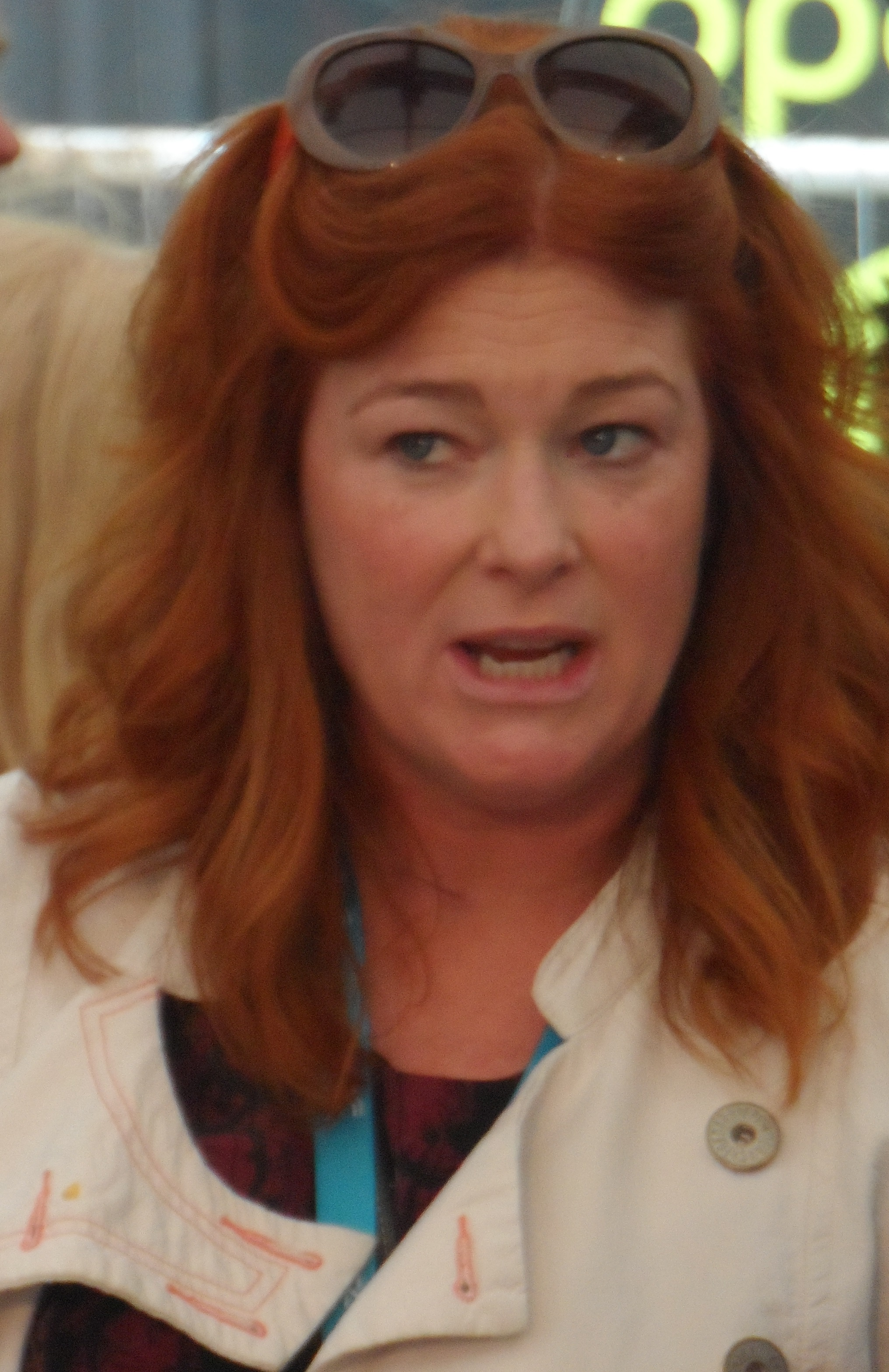
- Ní Chofaigh in 2016
- Born: 12 November 1970 (age 55); Ontario, Canada
- Occupation: Television presenter
- Spouse: Ciarán Byrne
- Children: 4
- Parent(s): Sean Ó Cofaigh, Aine Nic Riogh

Bláthnaid Ní Chofaigh (pronounced [ˈbˠl̪ˠaːn̪ˠədʲ n̠ʲiː ˈxɔfˠiː]; born 12 November 1970) is an Irish TV presenter, she has presented Echo Island, The Afternoon Show and Charity ICA Bootcamp. She was a judge in The All Ireland Talent Show and participated in Celebrity Bainisteoir. Since 2020, she has been a presenter on the RTÉ magazine programme Nationwide.

== Career ==
Ní Chofaigh is a journalist, presenter and broadcaster on Irish television. Former presenter of Sin É, and former reporter for RTÉ News and Current Affairs, she covered stories as diverse as the Clinton visit; 2004 Summer Olympics in Athens, 2003 Special Olympics World Summer Games; tall ships and female genital mutilation.

Ní Chofaigh has presented shows such as The Afternoon Show, Echo Island and The RTÉ People in Need Telethon on RTÉ Television. Her first role as a TV presenter was with the teenage weekly evening show Jo Maxi during the early 1990s. At the time she featured on advert for Oil of Ulay.

Ní Chofaigh presents the Saint Patrick's Day Parade live every year in Dublin City.

She translated the song "The Best is Yet to Come" into the Irish language for the Metal Gear Solid Original Game Soundtrack.

Ní Chofaigh announced the votes for Ireland in the Eurovision Song Contest in 2001.

Ní Chofaigh co-presented The Afternoon Show from the first season in 2003 but abandoned it in 2009, complaining of health problems. The show was axed in 2010 a year after she left. She was a judge on The All Ireland Talent Show, and had great success on the final season with her act Daniel Furlong who took home the trophy.

In 2007 she was voted one of Ireland's sexiest women in a Sunday Independent magazine poll.

In 2010, Ní Chofaigh took part in the reality TV series Celebrity Bainisteoir, managing Nobber GFC, based in her home county of Meath. She took the team as far as the semi-final and then she lost. In 2011, Ní Chofaigh began hosting a new series called Charity ICA Bootcamp, which pitted celebrities taking on each other in challenges, with the winner Peter Clohessy receiving money to give to his chosen charity.

Ní Chofaigh was back on television with another afternoon lifestyle day-time talk show on RTÉ One in November 2012 alongside Norah Casey.

In January 2013, Ni Chofaigh made her acting debut in the TG4 series Crisis Eile, playing politician Maeve Kelly-Clarke.

Following the retirement of long-serving host Mary Kennedy, in 2020 Ní Chofaigh became a co-presenter of the long-running RTÉ magazine programme Nationwide, broadcast three times a week.

In 2022, Ní Chofaigh gave a TEDx talk, through Irish on the topic of being an Irish speaker in modern Ireland.

== Personal life ==
Born in Canada, she was raised in the Gaeltacht of Ráth Chairn, County Meath, Ireland. She is married with four children and currently lives in Dublin. Ní Chofaigh is a native Irish speaker, and an Irish-language campaigner.

Ní Chofaigh is an ambassador for the charity Plan Ireland.
