= John Creedon =

Irish broadcaster

- Creedon on No Béarla in 2007
- Born: 3rd November 1958 (age 67–68)
- Other name: "Creedo"
- Occupation: Broadcaster
- Employer: RTÉ
- Known for: Broadcasting, music, sport and Irish language passions, television appearances
- Partner: Mairead Heffernan
- Children: 4

John Creedon (born 3rd November 1958), also known as "Creedo", is an Irish language enthusiast and veteran broadcaster with RTÉ Radio in Ireland. He is the host of The John Creedon Show on weekday evenings from 8pm to 10pm on RTÉ Radio 1, and has also filled in for Dave Fanning on The Dave Fanning Show.

His profile was raised by his participation in and eventual winning of the reality television series, Fáilte Towers in August 2008. Creedon has also served as a judge on The All Ireland Talent Show on RTÉ One and TG4's Glór Tíre. He has also presented multiple television series on RTÉ of him travelling across Ireland showcasing the country's history and geography, along with some lesser known stories of the areas he visits.

== Career ==
Creedon's career began with an initial failed audition for a job on RTÉ 2fm, but he went on to twice top the Irish Singles Chart with his character, Terence the Cork hairdresser. Terence was a frequent contributor to The Gerry Ryan Show in the early 1990s. Creedon won a Jacob's Award in 1992 for his RTÉ Radio 1 morning show, Risin' Time. Prior to his RTÉ career, Creedon broadcast on Cork pirate radio stations in the early-mid 1980s, most notably as 'John Blake' on ERI.

Over the years, Creedon has hosted shows on RTÉ Radio One at various times of the day. The Creedon Show (15:30) was replaced by a programme hosted by Ronan Collins in 2006. This change followed new radio chief, Ana Leddy's decision to move him on as part of widespread alterations across the station. John also hosted Late Date on RTÉ Radio 1 for some time prior to his move to the current 8 to 10pm slot.

In August 2008 Creedon took part in the reality television series, Fáilte Towers, a show that saw a group of well-known personalities attempt to run a hotel for a two-week period whilst earning money for charity. Creedon was proclaimed winner of the show on 17 August 2008. Creedon selected Our Lady's Children's Hospital, Crumlin as his charity for the show due to his personal involvement with the hospital in the past. In 2007, his granddaughter Lucie was born prematurely to his daughter, Katie, who suffered from kidney problems as a child. Lucie died eight and a half weeks later. Commenting on the win, Creedon said: "The big fat guy never wins anything, this is great." After his victory, he presented a show for the RTÉ Concert Orchestra and partook in TG4 series Faoi Lan Cheoil where, alongside Oscar-winning actor Jeremy Irons and international and Premier League footballer Andy Reid, he learnt a new musical instrument over six months in preparation for a public performance. Creedon was then a judge on The All Ireland Talent Show, representing the south of the country alongside Michael Healy-Rae and Sinéad Sheppard. Judge Creedon warned fellow judge Dáithí Ó Sé to stop stealing acts from Munster, alleging that he invaded County Clare in series one and that he would be "answerable to me and to my gang" if he continued to persist. After a short stint presenting Late Date, he was given his own 20:30 weekday music show on RTÉ Radio 1 in 2009.

In 2011, Creedon hosted a television series called 'Creedon's Retro Road Trip' in which he retraces the route of the only holiday his entire family ever took. His family's two-week holiday took place in 1969 with his eleven brothers and sisters who travelled across Ireland with a borrowed caravan. Creedon recreated the trip over forty years later and explored how the country had changed.

Creedon's next television series was titled 'Creedon's Cities' in which he visited the four major cities in the Republic of Ireland; Dublin, Galway, Limerick and Cork. The series aired in 2012.

'Creedon's Wild Atlantic Way' aired in 2015. The series consists of 3 episodes showcasing points of interest along the Wild Atlantic Way. Creedon travels along this tourist route in his 1960s VW campervan.

== Filmography ==
Television
Year	Title	Role
1990s	Review Of The Week	Presenter
2001	Health Show	Presenter
2007	No Béarla	Actor
2008	Fáilte Towers	Contestant
2009	The All Ireland Talent Show	Judge
2011	Creedon's Retro Road Trip	Presenter
2012	Creedon's Cities	Presenter
2014	Creedon's Weather 4 Seasons In 1 Day	Presenter
2015	Creedon's Wild Atlantic Way	Presenter
2016	Creedon's Epic East	Presenter
2017	Creedon's Shannon	Presenter
2018	Creedon's Road Less Traveled	Presenter
2019, 2021 & 2022	Creedon's Atlas Of Ireland	Presenter
2024 & 2026	Creedon's Musical Atlas Of Ireland	Presenter

== Critique ==
After his turn on Fáilte Towers, journalist and RTÉ colleague Joe O'Shea described Creedon's personality as being that of "somebody who gives space to others and is not intent on sucking up all of the available on-screen oxygen". In March 2008, it was to Creedon's radio show that befuddled Irish listeners turned when RTÉ shut down its 82-year-old medium wave service. Within hours of the shutdown, they were contacting John Creedon's RTÉ radio show, "wondering how they could tune in to the newfangled VHF – or "VHI", as one gentleman insisted on calling it".

In an interview about his television series 'Creedon's Shannon' he talks of an old review of him that called him a "third rate presenter". While it did upset him at the time he recalls that his daughter Nanci told him "I'd rather be a third-rate presenter than a first-rate critic" a sentiment to which he says "I've kept that one in my back pocket, d'you know?".

== Personal life ==
"Death is not the opposite to life. It's the opposite to birth."

— ^{Creedon's philosophical outlook as he reflected upon the death of his granddaughter.}

Creedon was raised with eleven siblings. He claimed in a 2008 Late Late Show interview that he once worked in a Penneys branch. He previously lived in Goatstown, Dublin, but now resides in Cork on a hill overlooking the city centre. His musical taste is eclectic, ranging from local band Fred to The Beatles, Nina Simone, Bruce Springsteen and Van Morrison. His record collection includes albums by Miles Davis and John Coltrane and selections from Americana, Eric Bibb, John Prine and the Handsome Family.

An avid Irish language speaker, Creedon appeared on the first series of No Béarla, broadcast in 2007. He has spoken to the BBC about his search for his nation's favourite Irish word. He supports his local football club, Cork City F.C., a League of Ireland team.

One of Creedon's favourite memories is the visit of Pope John Paul II to Ireland in 1979. He described the Pope "landing that helicopter by himself in Phoenix Park in 1979" as "truly memorable".
