= Shane Lynch =

Irish singer

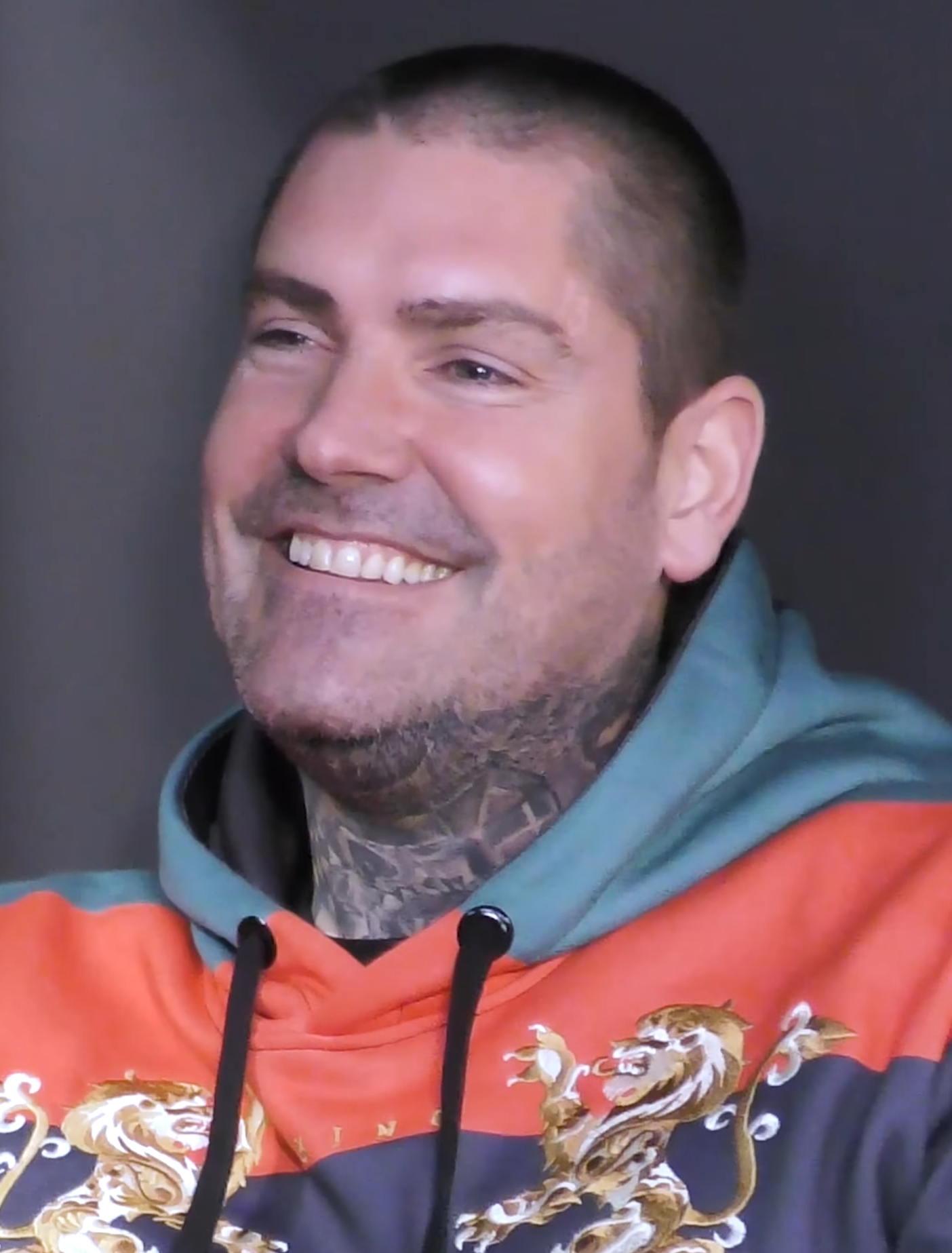
- Lynch in 2020

Background information
- Born: Shane Eamon Mark Stephen Lynch; 3 July 1976 (age 50); Donaghmede, Dublin, Ireland
- Genres: Pop
- Occupations: Singer, actor, television personality, racing driver
- Years active: 1993–present
- Label: Universal Records
- Formerly of: Boyzone; Keith 'N' Shane; REDhill; Cruise Control; Boyz on Block

Shane Eamon Mark Stephen Lynch (born 3 July 1976) is an Irish singer, best known as a member of Boyzone. He has also taken part in auto racing, participated in reality shows such as Celebrity Big Brother in 2018 and appeared as a judge on The All Ireland Talent Show.

== Early life ==
Born to Brendan - a mechanic - and Noeleen Lynch - a housewife - and raised in Donaghmede, North-east Dublin, Lynch struggled with his education during his school years due to dyslexia, but excelled at sports and was a motor racing enthusiast, winning the Portuguese BMX Championship at fourteen. Around this period he was expelled from school and began to work with his father as a mechanic.

== Career ==
=== Boyzone ===
In 1993, music manager Louis Walsh, who had managed Johnny Logan, held auditions in Dublin to find a new boyband to rival British group Take That. Lynch was the founding member and didn't audition. Before even recording any material, he and five other successful auditionees made their infamous appearance on RTÉ's The Late Late Show with Gay Byrne. Although their performance was criticised by the Irish press, the band became one of the most successful pop bands in Ireland.

Lynch quickly gained a reputation as the bad boy of the group due to his body piercings, tattoos and violent outbursts which clashed with the band's clean-cut image. In 1999, he attended the MTV Europe Music Awards with the band, wearing a FUBU tracksuit to differentiate himself from Boyzone's consistent, tailored suits, and announced to the shocked audience "In the press recently, there's been a whole load of fucking shite about Boyzone in the year 2000 about breaking up, [but] we are not breaking up." Later that night, he was involved in a physical brawl with American rapper Puff Daddy. Two years later, at a live concert for Childline, Lynch turned to the camera and yelled: "Tabloid newspapers, you can kiss me fucking arse!"

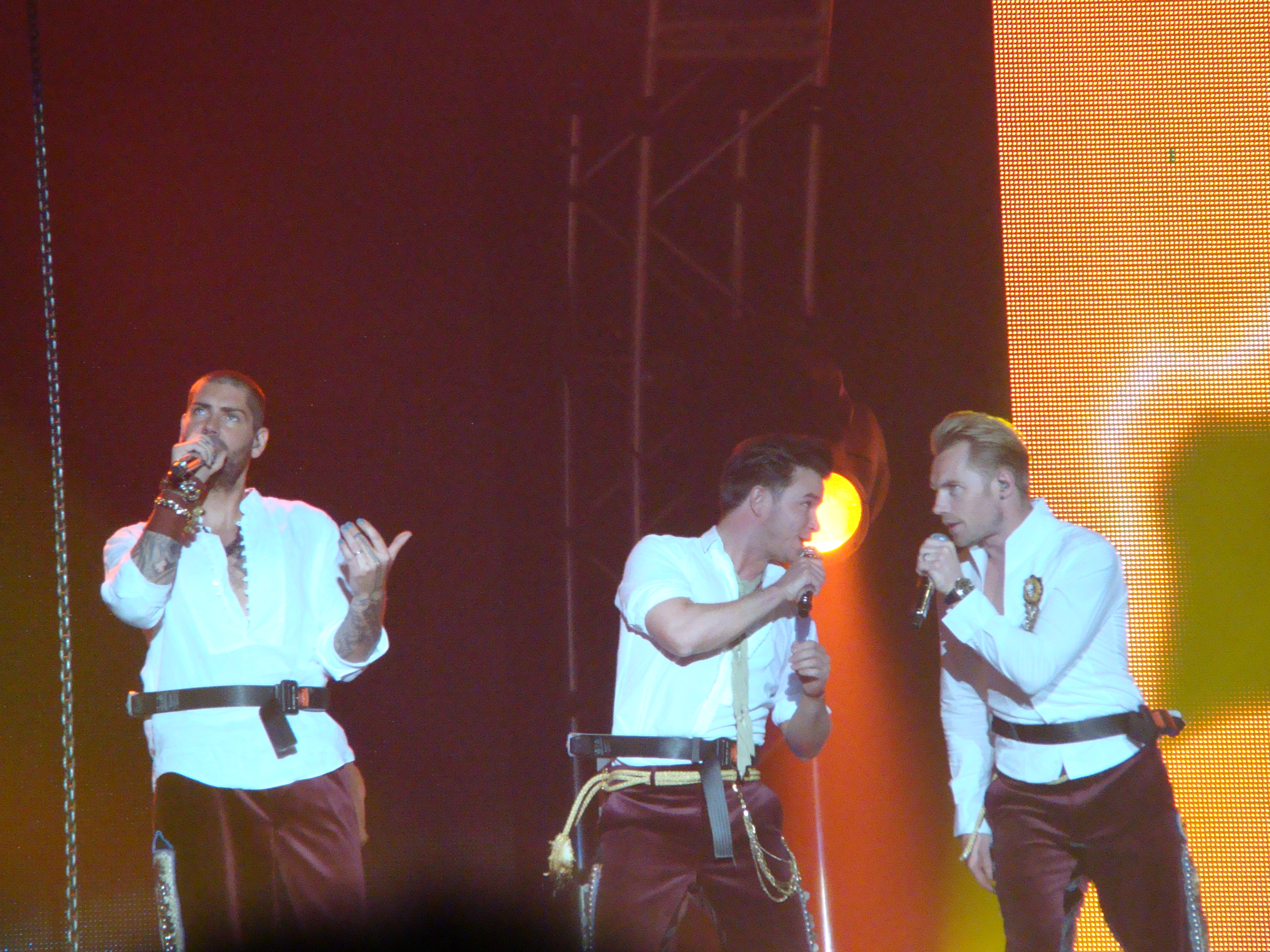
Lynch (left) performing with Boyzone in 2009

In 2007, Boyzone reunited, completed a 29-date reunion tour, and released their comeback single on 29 September 2008, Love You Anyway, which was followed by a Greatest Hits album entitled Back Again... No Matter What released on 13 October 2008.

=== Acting ===
In 2004, during his break from Boyzone, Lynch played Eli Knox the chairman of Harchester United in the Sky One football drama, Dream Team. He has also appeared in pantomime, and starred in Snow White and the Seven Dwarfs at the Wycombe Swan in High Wycombe, during the 2004 Christmas season. In 2006, he starred in Cinderella at the Tameside Hippodrome. In 2012, he starred as Abanazar at The Stag Theatre in Sevenoaks and in 2015 Captain Hook in Peter Pan there. In 2016 he starred as Abanazer in the Blue Genie production of Aladdin at The Whitley Bay Playhouse.

=== Motorsport ===
A keen motor racing enthusiast, Lynch raced a Marcos, TVR and then Mosler from 2002 to 2006 for the Eclipse Motorsport team in the British GT Championship, and came within a few laps of winning the 2003 British GT Championship at the last race of the season at Brands Hatch when he crashed into a spinning backmarker he was lapping. In 2005, he was involved with the 'Christians in Motorsport' team and competed in the British GT Championship Silverstone round. Lynch addressed a crowd of race fans at the team marquee about how his faith helps him in racing and in life generally.

Lynch has also been involved in drifting, competing in the British Drift Championship for performance parts manufacturer & race team Team Japspeed. In 2008, he was involved in an accident with team-mate Danny Eyles while competing in the European Drift Championship round at Silverstone and, although he was not injured, both Nissan Skyline cars were written off.

For the 2016 season of the British Drift Championship, Lynch and Team Japspeed debuted a brand new VH45 V8 powered Nissan 370Z, achieving a second-place finish on debut at Lydden Hill.

=== Reality television ===
Lynch has taken part in several reality television series. He was in the second series of the Channel 4 reality television show, The Games 2004, and received a gold medal. Lynch was also in the second series of ITVs Love Island, but left after the fifth week. In 2007, he competed in the second series of Sky One's Cirque De Celebrite. He had a main role in the season 2 (2017) of Supercar Megabuild. In January 2018 Shane was a housemate in series 21 of Celebrity Big Brother and finished in third place.

In January 2013, Lynch fronted an informative channel 5 programme in the UK about dyslexia. During this, he undertook his own dyslexia assessment. He was confirmed to have the learning disability.

On 7 June 2013, Lynch featured on a celebrity special edition of The Jeremy Kyle Show to talk about his life after being in Boyzone.

In August 2013, he came fifth participating in Celebrity Masterchef.

Lynch was one of the seven celebrities that participated in Pilgrimage: The Road Through Portugal, a BBC Two series about a two weeks pilgrimage to Fátima, Portugal. He left before the final day, claiming that it was for religious reasons. He later clarified that he had a candle phobia: "One of the things is you would never get me into that Fatima place with 100,000 candles, that is like death to me."

=== Other work ===
In 2000, Lynch teamed up with bandmate Keith Duffy and released a novelty version of the Milli Vanilli song "Girl You Know It's True" as Keith 'N' Shane. They re-wrote the verses in which the original was critical of today's music, but the chorus was kept the same. It was a top 40 hit in the UK, peaking at No. 36 in December 2000. He also featured in the Celebrity Special Championship of Robot Wars in 2000.

In 2001, Lynch formed a rap rock band with Phats & Small's singer Ben Ofoedu called REDhill.

In early 2005, Lynch released the song "Don't Go" which was originally a 1988 hit for the band Hothouse Flowers. The same year, he was announced as one of the judges on RTÉ's The All Ireland Talent Show, a reality contest which is modelled on Britain's Got Talent. In 2010, he announced his decision to quit.

In 2008, Lynch published his autobiography The Chancer, which focused on his early years, pop reign, his marriage to Easther Bennett, and newly found Christianity. In May 2011, Lynch became involved with the launch of a new energy vodka called "Ver2Vodka".

In April 2014, Lynch opened a chain of 1920s prohibition inspired barbershops, known as The Elk & Clipper. There are three outlets in Northern Ireland.

In 2019, Lynch joined former REDHILL and Cruise Control bandmate Ben Ofoedu for a new supergroup called Boyz on Block with former Five member Abz Love and former Another Level member Dane Bowers. The group released their debut single on 20 November 2020, a cover of East 17's "Stay Another Day" featuring former East 17 member and songwriter Tony Mortimer. Their second single was a cover of K-Ci & JoJo's "All My Life", released on 15 February 2021. They had an album scheduled for released in 2021.

On 31 December 2025, Lynch performed with Keating on the latter's BBC One New Year's Eve programme, Ronan Keating and Friends: A New Year's Eve Party.

== Personal life ==
Lynch's sisters, twins Keavy and Edele Lynch, found fame as members of the girl group B*Witched, they became the first group to replace members of their own family at number one in the charts. Younger sister, Naomi, was part of the duo Buffalo G who achieved a top 20 hit, and another sibling, Tara, was a member of FAB!

On 8 March 1998, Lynch married Easther Bennett, lead singer of Eternal, but they divorced in July 2000. In 2002, Lynch was in a relationship with socialite, aristocrat and "It girl" Lady Victoria Hervey. On 22 August 2007, Lynch and singer Sheena White got married in Ireland. Since 2021, Lynch has occasionally appeared alongside his wife in ITV reality programme The Real Housewives of Cheshire, in which she has been a main cast member since series 14.

Lynch, who had been involved with clairvoyants and ouija boards, and claimed to have been frequently visited by evil spirits who tortured his mind in his teenage years, became a Christian in 2003.

== Discography ==
=== Singles ===
As Keith 'N' Shane

- "Girl You Know It's True" (2000), Polydor - UK #36

Solo

- "Don't Go" (2005), AMR
