= Marty in the Morning =

Marty in the Morning is RTÉ lyric fm's breakfast show, presented by Marty Whelan.

It originally aired as the title of RTÉ 2fm's breakfast show, presented also by Whelan from 26 September 2005 until it was axed when Colm & Jim-Jim joined from FM104. The duo held the 2fm breakfast slot with The Colm & Jim-Jim Breakfast Show until the death of Gerry Ryan prompted a further change in the schedules in 2010.

Marty in the Morning was an attempt by 2fm to find a successor to Ryan Tubridy, who had left The Full Irish and defected to RTÉ Radio 1 in 2005. However, in May 2006, it emerged that the show was receiving fewer listeners than its rival The Ian Dempsey Breakfast Show on Today FM. Before this, Whelan's predecessors as breakfast presenters were Rick O'Shea and Ruth Scott, Tubridy's replacement The Rick & Ruth Breakfast Show was axed after it emerged the flagship The Gerry Ryan Show was losing 40,000 listeners to Today FM's The Ray D'Arcy Show. O'Shea and Scott were blamed for this and quickly disappeared off the morning airwaves.
