= The Ryan Tubridy Show =

Irish mid-morning talk radio show

The Ryan Tubridy Show is a mid-morning talk radio show, presented by Ryan Tubridy each weekday on Virgin Radio UK and simultaneously broadcast on Dublin's Q102 from 10 am to 1 pm, from January 2024 to December 2025.

Tubridy also presents a dedicated Irish weekend radio show, The Ryan Tubridy Show on Sundays, each Sunday from 10 am to 12 pm across Dublin's Q102, Cork's 96FM, LMFM, and Limerick's Live 95.

== RTÉ Radio 1 ==
The Ryan Tubridy Show is a talk radio show, presented by Ryan Tubridy each weekday morning on RTÉ Radio 1 from 9 am to 10 am, from September 2015 to August 2023 (although Tubridy last presented in June 2023).

The theme tune played as the intro to every show was an extract from the song "S.E.C.R.E.T." by Delorentos.

Ryan rejoined the station after five years with RTÉ 2fm presenting Tubridy; he previously presented The Tubridy Show on RTÉ Radio 1 between 2005 and 2010.

=== Scandal ===
On 22 June 2023, it was announced that Tubridy had received €345,000 in hidden payments between 2017 and 2022 for presenting this radio show and The Late Late Show. The €345,000 in hidden payments came on top of his officially reported earnings of between €440,000 and €495,000 per annum in that time period. The presenter, who was RTÉ's highest earner, was taken off the radio on 23 June 2023.

Amid the scandal, and after a week where Tubridy was in the centre of all the news, Center Parcs said on 29 June it would not be renewing its sponsorship deal with The Ryan Tubridy Show (worth €295,000 since November 2022) and also said it might pull out before that time, to prevent its name being tainted by association with RTÉ's hidden payments to Tubridy. On 30 June, RTÉ said the Center Parcs sponsorship deal had been "paused".

On 17 August 2023, it was confirmed that Tubridy would not return to his presenting role in RTÉ in the wake of the scandal. The last edition of the show was presented by Tubridy replacement Brendan Courtney on Friday 18 August 2023. Tubridy's name was then removed from the show, with it becoming known as The Nine O'Clock Show instead and new introductory music put in place of Tubridy's chosen song "S.E.C.R.E.T." The first edition of The Nine O'Clock Show was presented by Oliver Callan on Monday 21 August 2023.
