= Marty Whelan =

Irish media presenter

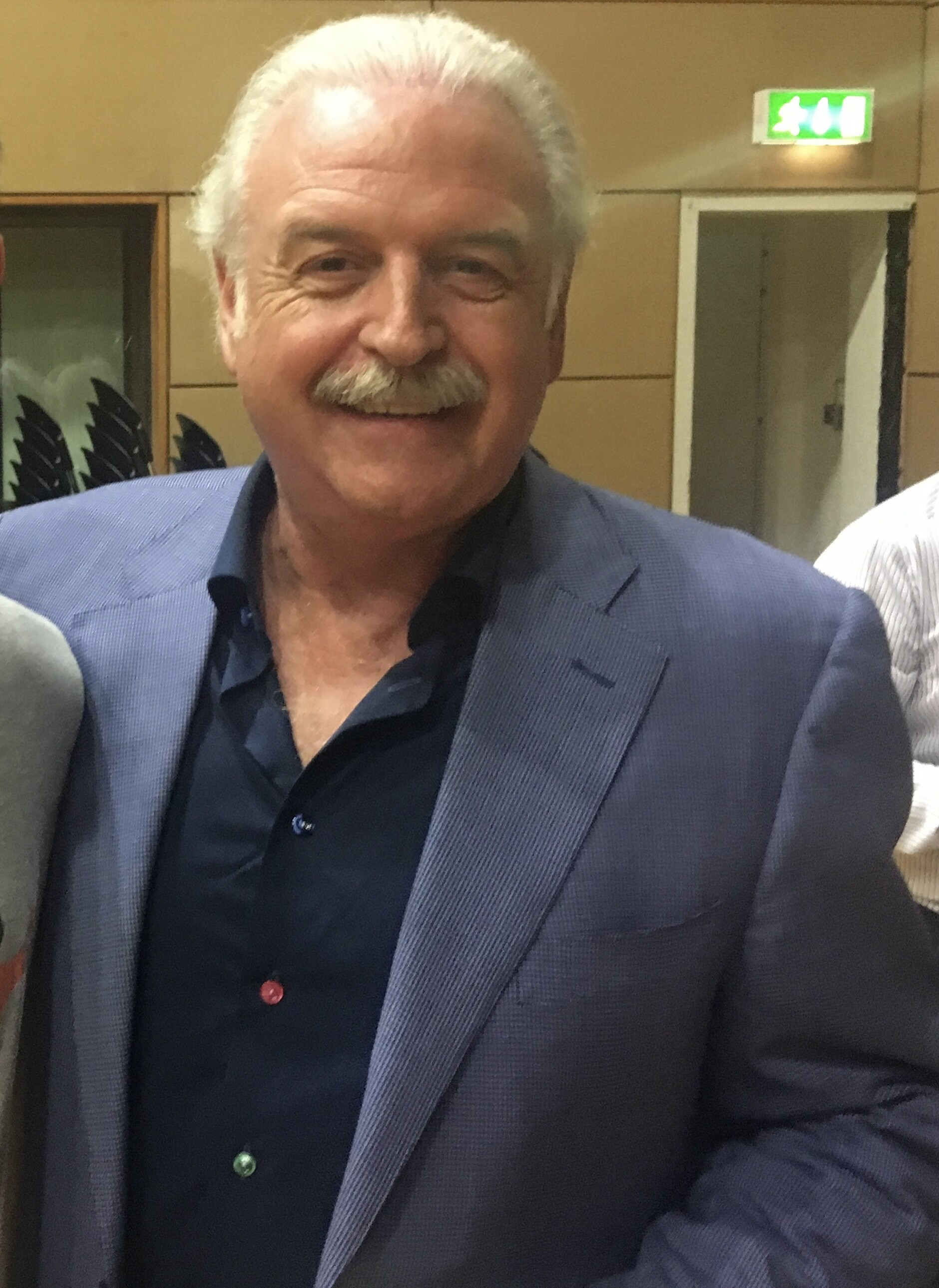
- Whelan in 2018
- Born: Martin Whelan; 7 June 1956 (age 70); Dublin, Ireland
- Occupation: Broadcaster
- Employer: Raidió Teilifís Éireann (RTÉ)
- Spouse: Maria Whelan (m. 1985)
- Children: 2
- Parent(s): John and Lilly Whelan

Martin "Marty" Whelan (born 7 June 1956) is an Irish radio and television personality currently working for RTÉ. His early television credits included the game shows Millionaire and Fame and Fortune, and the weekday afternoon show, Open House.

In 1997, Whelan became the host of the annual The Rose of Tralee contest, a role he held until 2003 when Ryan Tubridy replaced him. His RTÉ 2fm radio show, Marty in the Morning was axed in 2007 and replaced with The Colm & Jim-Jim Breakfast Show. Whelan now presents Marty in the Morning on RTÉ Lyric fm. He has since made a return to television, winning the reality series Celebrity Bainisteoir in 2008. Since winning the series, he has made another return to television to guest-host the RTÉ One topical comedy show The Panel. He also acted as guest judge in RTÉ's Charity You're a Star, standing in for Louis Walsh in one programme.

Marty at Midday saw Whelan receive his own weekday lunchtime show on RTÉ lyric fm, commencing September 2009. He then returned to television again in September 2009 to co-present Winning Streak with Kathryn Thomas. He has been doing this ever since.

In 1987 and 2000 to 2025, Whelan has provided the television commentary for RTÉ's coverage of the Eurovision Song Contest (joined by Phil Coulter in 2003).

== Early life ==
Whelan was born in Dublin, Ireland on 7 June 1956. He was an only child. He commented on his childhood, "I had cousins, friends constantly to play with -- my memories are all in the company of children."

Whelan attended school in Killester. He spent five years working with an insurance company before he made the break into radio with the pirate radio station Radio Dublin. He left this station as part of a wider split, along with most of the DJs to form the Big D in April 1978. Whelan initially worked on weekend shows, but in a new schedule in September 1978 he got his first daytime slot doing the drivetime show.

== Career ==
=== 1979–1990 ===
In 1979, Whelan joined RTÉ Radio 2, now known as RTÉ 2fm. Prior to that he worked on pirate radio under the name Marty Hall. During his first tenure with the station he presented a number of shows such as Drivetime and Marty till Midnight. He also spent three years presenting RTÉ 2fm's Breakfast Show in a role he would return to in 2005.

In the mid-1980s Whelan began developing his television career, becoming the first male presenter of the hit fashion programme Head 2 Toe. Other popular TV shows followed, including the Where in the World? quiz programme (1987–1989) and Video File (1983–1989), in which he interviewed major stars of the music world.

In 1989, Whelan left RTÉ radio to join its rival radio station, Century Radio. When that project failed he was given the cold shoulder by RTÉ.

=== 1991–2004 ===
Whelan returned to the national broadcaster in the mid-1990s when he presented such shows as Go For It, Off the Record and Millionaire. He hosted RTÉ One's summer lottery show Fame and Fortune on Saturday nights for at least ten years. He spent ten years on television as presenter of the John Player Tops.

In 1997, Whelan became Master of Ceremonies at the annual Rose of Tralee contest but, in the first of a series of losses, he was replaced by Ryan Tubridy in 2003. In 2004, RTÉ's flagship afternoon magazine programme Open House was axed, leaving Whelan jobless once again. Whelan had filled the role of co-host alongside Mary Kennedy since 1998. He was reported to be "shocked" and "very disappointed". He also said he would "personally deliver every copy" of Mary Kennedy's new book Paper Tigers, reasoning, "Sure I have nothing else to be doing with my time".

=== 2004–present ===
A substitute slot for Gerry Ryan on his morning radio show on RTÉ 2fm in the summer of 2005 led to a more permanent return to the station for Whelan. Marty in the Morning, which itself caused controversy when it replaced The Rick & Ruth Breakfast Show, began on 26 September 2005. In January 2007, it was announced that Marty in the Morning would end that March when Colm & Jim-Jim arrived from FM104. He was on holiday when he discovered another show had been axed. Whelan returned to the role of filling in for Gerry Ryan when Ryan was on leave.

Since then Whelan has appeared as himself in feature films, at the co-opening of a Dunnes outlet in Galway with retired broadcaster Gay Byrne and filling a cameo role (again as himself) on the soap opera, Fair City. He still commentates on RTÉ's television coverage of the Eurovision Song Contest each May.

Whelan presented a two-hour Sunday with Marty Whelan show on RTÉ lyric fm from Sunday, 1 March 2009 at 14:30, taking over from veteran broadcaster Gay Byrne, but only until that September. In July 2009, Whelan provided commentary on the Michael Jackson memorial service for RTÉ Two. Following on from Sunday with Marty Whelan, he received his own weekday lunchtime show on lyric fm, Marty at Midday, commencing September 2009. That same month, he began co-presenting Winning Streak on RTÉ One each Saturday night, alongside Sinead Kennedy.

As of October 2010 Whelan presents Marty in the Morning weekday mornings between 7 and 10 on RTÉ Lyric FM. His more recent television programmes apart from Winning Streak were in summer 2009 he presented a series called A Little Bit Funny followed by A Little Bit Eurovision in summer 2011.

=== Eurovision Song Contest ===
In 1987 and 1988, Whelan co-hosted Eurosong (Irish heats for the Eurovision Song Contest) along with Maxi. RTÉ gave the commentator's job to different presenters between 1988 and 1999 including Mike Murphy, Ronan Collins, Jimmy Greeley and Pat Kenny. In the autumn of 1999, Pat Kenny decided not to return as Commentator. Reportedly Gerry Ryan (who had hosted the contest in 1994) was RTÉ's favourite for the job. However, it was later announced that RTÉ would give the job back to Whelan. Whelan returned to commentate for Ireland at the 2000 Contest, which was held in Sweden and continued to provide commentary for RTÉ from 2000 to 2025.

== Personal life ==
Whelan is married to Maria. They have two children. The couple met in 1974 at the Grove Social Club in Clontarf, Dublin, dating for over ten years before marrying on 13 August 1985. At the time, they were both living at home, Maria gave up her job as an air hostess with Aer Lingus following their marriage. Whelan's interests include badminton, rugby, DIY and football. In his spare time he likes to play indoor football with some of his colleagues at RTE. In October 2015, Whelan released his memoirs called That’s Life.

== Awards ==
In 1986, Whelan won a Jacob's Award for Video File.

In September 2026, Whelan was inducted into the IMRO Radio Awards Hall of Fame.

Year	Nominee / work	Award	Result
1986	Marty Whelan	Jacob's Awards	Won

== Advertising ==
In 1984 he featured in an advert for Knorr sauces. (1992–1996) he featured in a series of Daz adverts.
