= The Gerry Ryan Show =

- Genre: Chat / music
- Running time: 09:00 - midday
- Country of origin: Ireland
- Language: English
- Home station: RTÉ 2fm
- Produced by: Siobhan Hough
- Recording studio: Donnybrook, Dublin 4
- Original release: March 1988 – 30 April 2010
- Audio format: FM and Digital radio
- Opening theme: 2fm signature tune
- Website: Official site
- Podcast: The Weekly Ryan

"All the 2fm pricks are here!"

— ^{A 2008 promotion on The Gerry Ryan Show, "Aero Hunt For the Hunk" (30 September 2008), led to this Ryan jest. Colm & Jim-Jim's response: "I hope this doesn't stick!".} ^{The catchphrase "You pick and we'll prick" was then adopted in reference to contestants picking a numbered balloon for the breakfast hosts to burst to see if it contained a prize.}

The Gerry Ryan Show (often referred to as The Ryan Show, The G. Ryan Show or GRS) is a now-defunct RTÉ 2fm's mid-morning radio show. Presented by Gerry Ryan until hours before his sudden death, it was launched in March 1988 and ran from nine until midday on weekday mornings.

Described by the BBC as "a de facto forum for the nation, the radio equivalent of The Late Late Show on RTÉ television", the show, in its later years, popularised the satire of Nob Nation, spawned the cross-media event Operation Transformation and provided a launchpad for the career of Ryan Tubridy. Siobhan Hough was resident producer of the show.

== Sponsorship ==
At the time of his death Ryan had the largest audience on RTÉ 2fm. He presented the station's only show which was regularly among the top twenty Irish radio shows in Ireland, a show which commanded around €4-5 million for RTÉ per annum, mainly through advertising (one thirty-second advertisement during the show cost €900). This meant RTÉ would have earned €27,000 through advertising per day.

In March 2008 RTÉ's difficulties in securing a sponsor for a number of their radio shows was placed under the spotlight. The Gerry Ryan Show was one of the shows given away for cheaper than the normal rates.

== Format ==
The show consisted of topical interviews and phone-ins via the "Ryan Line". Ryan began by discussing the headlines of that morning's newspapers. Following the news update at 10:00, he introduced that morning's Nob Nation, a satirical slot which featured impersonations of politicians and RTÉ media personnel comparable to rival station Today FM's Gift Grub. GRS was preceded by the ever-changing breakfast slot, currently occupied by The Colm & Jim-Jim Breakfast Show. Stand-in presenters included Gareth O'Callaghan, Rick O'Shea, Jenny Huston, Avril Hoare and even axed breakfast host, Marty Whelan. There were also contributions from Evelyn O'Rourke, Brenda Donohue, Valerie Sweeney, Fiona Looney (weekly) and Jenny Huston. Looney and Ryan's fondness for one another led to Looney being dubbed Ryan's "on-air wife".

Willie O'Reilly was the show's executive producer until June 1999, and was chief executive of Today FM at Ryan's death.

== History ==
=== 1988–1994 ===
Ryan found the time period around the start of GRS exciting - "the whole machine shook... it was like the space-shuttle engines starting up". The defining moment of the show came in 1993. When Levinia Kerwick was raped and her rapist was convicted but given a suspended sentence, she rang GRS to air her feelings. For the first time it occurred to Ryan that the story was more important than the question. Following this, The Ryan Show became something of a national institution as the oldest show still running on 2fm.

=== 1995–2000 ===
In 1997, Ryan's wife Morah, from whom he later separated, phoned her husband's show and, under the name Norah, told half a million listeners that her husband dumps his underpants on the floor before hopping into bed every night, doesn't put his clothes on hangers, had not cleaned the dog's mess from the back yard for weeks and never puts the rubbish out for the dustbin men. When she was done she asked her husband: "You would do that now, wouldn't you Gerry?" The interview was nearing its finish when he realised what was happening after hearing his crew laughing in the Montrose control room. An embarrassed Ryan informed his listeners: "This is my wife talking".

"Wouldn't it be great to see Mary Harney with no clothes, running around getting a whip and being put on a bus!"

— ^{Ryan attempts to explain to an irate caller, who is upset at the withdrawal of cervical vaccinations for schoolchildren, how ridiculous the proposition of government ministers giving up their state cars would be. He was adamant that such expenses were not to blame for the current recession that grips the Irish nation.}

In November 1999, RTÉ broadcaster Paddy O'Gorman "outraged the medical establishment" after an appearance on The Gerry Ryan Show to discuss World AIDS Day when he said that AIDS was not a heterosexual disease, but exclusively a gay one.

=== 2001–2007 ===
Broadcaster Ryan Tubridy began his career with The Gerry Ryan Show, working as a teaboy before obtaining his own breakfast show, The Full Irish, a programme which Gerry Ryan once claimed was "the most exciting broadcast at that hour of the morning since Ian Dempsey started on Today FM". Ryan has since stated his belief that it was "a giant act of folly" for Ryan Tubridy to move to RTÉ Radio 1. Ryan viewed Tubridy as "kind of like a son" whom he used to (and still does) lecture frequently. He said he begged him "on bended knees" and "over whiskey" to stay with 2fm but at the same time Ryan was impressed that Tubridy was willing to compete with him directly.

Tubridy has credited Ryan with being "one of the few gentlemen in [RTÉ]", saying he had been "very kind to me when I started out in RTÉ making tea and coffee and right all the way up to the very day I got The Late Late Show job".

In 2004, Ryan was the subject of controversy when he cancelled an interview with the Taoiseach of the time, Bertie Ahern. Ahern had agreed to appear on The Gerry Ryan Show after the delivery of that year's government budget but moments before he set off for RTÉ's Donnybrook headquarters, the show's producers rang his office and informed aides that they no longer wished to interview him. Associates of the Taoiseach were said to be "fuming" over the affair, saying "you can't just ask for an interview with the most powerful man in the country and then ditch him as if he was some stand-in celebrity." Ahern was replaced by RTÉ's economics reporter George Lee.

=== 2008–2010 ===
A complaint against a July 2008 programme which featured an author reading about life as a homosexual prostitute was upheld by the Broadcasting Complaints Commission.

On 12 September 2008, Ryan invited listeners to text in their reasons for loving Ireland in an attempt to dispel all the bad-weathered, financially troubling and futuristically worrying news that was dominating the headlines at the time. 50 of these reasons were later published on the show's website. These included the scenery, Guinness, potatoes, the seas and coastline, whiskey, Barry's and Lyon's tea, Kimberley and Mikado biscuits, the smell of turf, red hair, homemade brown bread, oysters, Baileys coffee, hurling, Irish comedians, Irish history, the River Shannon, Podge and Rodge, Irish literature, bacon and cabbage, Irish stew and the GAA. Some of the choices had connections to the show such as the show itself, Riverdance (first introduced to the world by the presenter) and, although not the case at the time, The Late Late Show, which Ryan presented the following month.

Despite repeated reshuffles which have seen all other presenters shifted around, RTÉ never moved The Ryan Show from its traditional slot. After a brief period of decline in his audience, all of the recent JNLR figures showed a consistent and significant increase in his listenership - with his audience growing by almost 15% in the course of the past year (The Irish Times, 16 May 2008). The Green Day single "Know Your Enemy" received its first play on Irish radio on The Gerry Ryan Show on 16 April 2009.

During the February 2009 snowfall Ryan reminded his listeners of a similar snowfall in 1982, when the Government even appointed Tánaiste and Labour party leader Michael O'Leary as the Minister for Snow.

". . .the nation seemed to go into collective shock when the biggest snow fall in 40 years hit this country", read Ryan from a report of the chaos caused. "Taoiseach Garret Fitzgerald even cut short his sun holiday in the Canary Islands as the country came to a standstill. The snow was up to 1.5 meters deep in some areas and temperatures dropped as low as minus 7 degrees. Gale force easterly winds caused electricity to be knocked out in many areas and businesses and schools closed all across the country."

Ryan attracted a complaint for using "coarse language" whilst debating on blasphemy on 29 April 2009. The presenter asked: "Would it be considered blasphemous if someone said on air that 'God is a bollocks?'" but the complaint was later rejected.

A 45-year-old caller from Dublin gave an interview in November 2009 about urges he had to stalk, rape and murder women, including air hostesses at Dublin Airport. The interview led to a garda investigation.

Ryan was reported to be upset in March 2010 when his long-serving producer Siobhan Hough was moved to The Colm & Jim-Jim Breakfast Show.

His death on 30 April 2010 brought about the end of The Gerry Ryan Show. Fiona Looney presented the show that day prior to the discovery of his corpse in his Leeson Street apartment. Two tribute shows were presented by Evelyn O'Rourke and Brenda Donohue on 1 May and 4 May. Ruth Scott presented the three-hour slot from 5 May until 7 May, described by RTÉ as "an appropriate music programme". The Colm and Lucy Show then began for one month on 10 May.

The final JNLR figures for The Gerry Ryan Show, released less than a month after Ryan's death, showed the radio programme was Ireland's most listened to among the 20-44 market at this time. This led to Siobhan O'Connell, writing in The Irish Times's financial section, to call any new show in that slot "the biggest prize right now in radio".

=== Operation Transformation ===
The now cross-media event Operation Transformation originated on The Gerry Ryan Show.

=== Undercurrents ===
In 2010, Ryan launched Undercurrents, a Friday slot airing unsigned unplaylisted Irish acts who then had their details published on his website. The Irish Independent's John Meagher disagreed that this was typical of RTÉ 2fm and Gerry Ryan.

A spin-off show of the demoed songs premiered on RTÉ 2XM on 5 March 2010, presented by GRS researcher John Bela Reilly.

Following Ryan's untimely death on 30 April 2010, Meagher hoped Undercurrents would be continued by his replacement as "it was a most worthwhile initiative to help young bands garner significant airplay".

Preceded by ?	RTÉ 2fm's mid-morning show 1988 – 2010	Succeeded by The Colm and Lucy Show; Tubridy
