= The Colm and Lucy Show =

Irish talk radio show

- Genre: Chat / music
- Running time: 09:00 - midday
- Country of origin: Ireland
- Language: English
- Home station: RTÉ 2fm
- Hosted by: Colm Hayes & Lucy Kennedy
- Recording studio: Donnybrook, Dublin 4
- Original release: 10 May 2010 – August 2010
- Audio format: FM and Digital radio
- Website: http://2fm.rte.ie/show/76/

The Colm and Lucy Show was an Irish talk radio show broadcast on RTÉ 2fm. It was presented by Colm Hayes and Lucy Kennedy. The Colm and Lucy Show began on 10 May 2010 and was a temporary replacement for The Gerry Ryan Show in the vacant 09:00–12:00 midday slot during weekdays. It was produced by the same producers who worked with Gerry Ryan before his death on 30 April 2010.

RTÉ announced The Colm and Lucy Show on 7 May 2010, stating that the programme would air for one month, and later announced that it would continue until the last week of August 2010 at which point Ryan Tubridy would begin his new show, permanently replacing Gerry Ryan. Colm Hayes underwent a temporary split with colleague Jim-Jim Nugent from The Colm & Jim-Jim Breakfast Show to present the programme with Lucy Kennedy.

The Colm and Lucy Show is intended to be similar to The Gerry Ryan Show, with Oliver Callan's satirical slot Nob Nation still featuring, alongside vintage clips of Ryan when he was alive. Head of 2fm John McMahon stated that "Gerry would not be forgotten" and that the show was intended for his fans. RTÉ denied reports that the Ryan family had any input in choosing Hayes and Kennedy as Ryan's temporary successors, nor did they have any input in choosing Ryan's permanent successor despite being "informed as a courtesy". Kennedy has said she does not want the job on a permanent basis. According to The Irish Times, the 09:00 AM - 12:00 midday slot is "the most critical in the 2fm schedule both in terms of audience figures and advertising revenue".

Kennedy faced some negative criticism from listeners and the media in the early days of the show, whilst other commentators applauded her courage for accepting the temporary post.

| Preceded by The Gerry Ryan Show | RTÉ 2fm's mid-morning show 2010 | Succeeded by Tubridy |
