= Home Run Derby (disambiguation) =

The Home Run Derby—as a proper name—is an annual home run hitting competition in Major League Baseball (MLB), usually held the day before the MLB All-Star Game.

A home run derby—as a general term—is a batting competition in baseball or softball during which the objective is to hit the most home runs.

Home Run Derby may also refer to:

- Triple-A Home Run Derby, a similar contest in Minor League Baseball
- CPBL Home Run Derby, a similar contest in the Chinese Professional Baseball League (CPBL)
- MLB Home Run Derby X, a global baseball tour operated by MLB that debuted in 2022
- Home Run Derby (TV series), a 1960 television show featuring MLB players in a home run hitting contest
- Winnie the Pooh's Home Run Derby, a 2007 baseball video game

== See also ==
- Home run (disambiguation)
