= Laura Woods (Irish presenter) =

Irish television presenter and radio host

- Education: Trinity College Dublin
- Occupations: Television presenter, Radio host
- Years active: 1999-present
- Employer(s): RTÉ Television, Virgin Media Television
- Television: iD, The Cafe, Winning Streak, Fame and Fortune, The Trump Card, The Big Money Game, Ireland AM

Laura Woods (born 12 May 1977) is an Irish television presenter and radio host.

== Career ==
Whilst in her third year at Trinity, Woods began her broadcasting career by working as a continuity announcer on RTÉ Radio. In 1999, she presented the Breakfast Show on Trinity FM. She joined RTÉ Television as a continuity announcer in 2000.

Moving from continuity announcing in September 2002, Woods became the face of iD (renamed iD Two in late 2004) and remained there until May 2005. In 2004 she began co-presenting three series of The Cafe with Aidan Power. Woods anchored RTÉ's coverage of the Festival of World Cultures in 2005 and 2006, and joined Dave Fanning in Hyde Park to cover Live8 in July 2005. In September 2005, she began hosting SMS, but left the show to concentrate on presenting the Irish National Lottery game show Winning Streak from January–March 2006 while regular presenter Derek Mooney was presenting You're a Star.

Woods hosted another Irish National Lottery game show called Fame and Fortune in June 2006, and went on to present the show's successors, The Trump Card from June–August 2007, and The Big Money Game from June–August 2008. In 2007, she also began presenting an event guide on 2fm's The Will Leahy Show and made an appearance on the People in Need Telethon. She appeared as a participant on Anonymous in the first half of 2008.

Woods then moved to independent station Virgin Media Television in 2011, where she was a panellist on the Midday programme, and she co-presented the breakfast show Ireland AM. She was made redundant in 2021 after Ireland AM got new presenters. Woods joined Q102 in 2026 to present a new weekday afternoon show Luara Woods joins Dublin’s Q102
