= 1995 in Irish television =

The following is a list of events relating to television in Ireland from 1995.

== Events ==
- 24 April – Network 2 airs the long running PBS television series for preschoolers Barney & Friends at 2 o'clock. The series was also very popular in Ireland and has often been transmitted on Network 2/RTÉ 2 as years and months go by, making it one of the most popular imported children's programmes on Irish television.
- 13 May – For the third year running, Ireland hosts the Eurovision Song Contest. This year marks the 40th event, presented by Mary Kennedy from The Point Theatre, Dublin. The BBC had offered to stage this year's Contest as a joint venture with RTÉ in Belfast as RTÉ were concerned they would not be able to afford the cost of hosting a third consecutive Contest. Ultimately an agreement was made that the BBC would host the 1996 event should Ireland win for a fourth time. However, it was won by Norway, while the Irish entry, "Dreamin'", sung by Eddie Friel, places fourteen in the competition. The winning song was the mostly instrumental piece, "Nocturne", by Secret Garden, although the group's violinist, Fionnuala Sherry, is Irish.
- July – RTÉ appoints Mark Little as its first Washington correspondent.
- 31 August – BBC 1 Northern Ireland airs the pilot of its comedy series Give My Head Peace. The programme was later commissioned as a series in 1998.
- 9 September – British animated series Fantomcat begins on Network 2, two days after its British television debut.
- 11 September – Ray D'Arcy, Socky and Dustin are back when Den TV returns to Network 2 after summer break. The return also marks the Irish television debut of the British children's animated series Budgie the Little Helicopter, based on the books by Sarah Ferguson. The series was also animated and produced in Ireland). Also debuting in Ireland is the American animated action series Biker Mice from Mars, reruns of the animated comedy series from Hanna-Barbera Dastardly and Muttley in Their Flying Machines (this was also the very first time the series has ever aired on Network 2), and Yogi Bear, as well as Irish programmes Pop Goes The Den, Dinin and The Joke Box, and the continuing episodes of animated series Cadillacs and Dinosaurs and The Flintstones, as well as the Canadian Nickelodeon/YTV supernatural-horror drama for children Are You Afraid of the Dark?.
- 12 September – US science fiction drama The X-Files receives its first ever Irish television debut on Network 2. The US sitcom Friends also premieres on Network 2 on the same day.
- 15 September – The hit BBC stop motion animated series for children Noddy's Toyland Adventures begins premiering in Ireland on Network 2 as part of Den TV.

== Debuts ==
=== RTÉ 1 ===
- 7 April – The Brittas Empire (1991–1997)
- 2 May – The Hanging Gale (1995)
- 19 May – Millionaire (1995)
- 24 June – The Nanny (1993–1999)
- 8 September – Upwardly Mobile (1995–1997)
- 15 September – Blue Heelers (1994–2006)
- 1 October – RoboCop (1994)
- 12 October – Degrees of Error (1995)
- 21 October – Postman Pat and the Tuba (1995)
- 21 October – Love on a Branch Line (1994)
- 28 October – Postman Pat and the Barometer (1995)
- 25 November – The Beatles Anthology (1995)
- Undated – Nuacht RTÉ (1995–present)
- Undated – Space Precinct (1994–1995)

=== Network 2 ===
- 5 January – Dig and Dug (1994)
- 9 January – Gerry Ryan Tonight (1995–1997)
- 11 January – Mission Top Secret (1992–1995)
- 14 February – Free Willy (1994)
- 15 February – Aladdin (1994–1995)
- 2 March – Widget (1990–1992)
- 19 March – Madballs (1986, 1987)
- 22 April – Cro (1993–1994)
- 24 April – Barney & Friends (1992–2010)
- 24 April – Sweet Valley High (1994–1997)
- 29 May – Droopy, Master Detective (1993)
- 29 May – Ocean Girl (1994–1997)
- 31 May – The Pirates of Dark Water (1991–1993)
- 1 June – The Legends of Treasure Island (1993–1995)
- 3 June – Jim Henson's Animal Show (1994–1998)
- 12 June – Jump Around (1995)
- 17 June – Hobberdy Dick (1992)
- 24 August – The Biz (1995–1997)
- 29 August – Cadillacs and Dinosaurs (1993–1994)
- 6 September – Boogies Diner (1994–1995)
- 9 September – The Marvel Action Hour (1994–1996)
- 9 September – Fantomcat (1995–1996)
- 11 September – Budgie the Little Helicopter (1994–1996)
- 11 September – Biker Mice from Mars (1993–1996)
- 12 September – The X-Files (1993–2002, 2016–2018)
- 12 September – Friends (1994–2004)
- 12 September – ReBoot (1994–2001)
- 12 September – X-Men (1992–1997)
- 13 September – Spider-Man (1994–1998)
- 14 September – Harry's Mad (1993–1996)
- 14 September – Creepy Crawlers (1994–1996)
- 14 September – Junglies (1992)
- 15 September – Noddy's Toyland Adventures (1992–2000)
- 16 September – The Critic (1994–1995)
- 16 September – Hamish Macbeth (1995–1997)
- 29 September – Tom & Jerry Kids (1990–1993)
- 6 October – Finbar's Class (1995–1996)
- 10 October – Santo Bugito (1995)
- 11 December – William's Wish Wellingtons (1994–1996)
- 14 December – The Gingerbread Man (1992)
- 19 December – The Mask: Animated Series (1995–1997)
- 24 December – Santa and the Tooth Fairies (1991)
- 24 December – The Glo Friends Save Christmas (1985)
- 26 December – O Christmas Tree (1994)
- 27 December – The Wind in the Willows (1995)
- 27 December – Summer with Selik (1993)
- 29 December – The Forgotten Toys (1995)
- Undated – 2TV (1995-2000s)
- Undated – Saved by the Bell: The New Class (1993–2000)
- Undated – Models Inc. (1994–1995)
- Undated – My So-Called Life (1994–1995)

== Changes of network affiliation ==
Shows	Moved from	Moved to
Yogi Bear	RTÉ 1	Network 2
Widget	Network 2	RTÉ 1
The Snowman	RTÉ 1	Network 2
Batman: The Animated Series	Network 2	RTÉ 1
Papa Beaver's Storytime	RTÉ 1	Network 2
Teenage Mutant Hero Turtles	Network 2	RTÉ 1
Dastardly and Muttley in Their Flying Machines	RTÉ 1	Network 2
Space Precinct	RTÉ 1	Network 2
Tiny Toon Adventures	RTÉ 1	Network 2
The Perils of Penelope Pitstop	RTÉ 1	Network 2
The Brady Bunch	Network 2	RTÉ 1
Tots TV	RTÉ 1	Network 2
Jump Around	Network 2	RTÉ 1
Casper and the Angels	RTÉ 1	Network 2
The Girl from Tomorrow	Network 2	RTÉ 1
The Odyssey	RTÉ 1	Network 2
Lois & Clark: The New Adventures of Superman	Network 2	RTÉ 1
Rupert	RTÉ 1	Network 2
Ocean Girl	Network 2	RTÉ 1
The Nanny	RTÉ 1	Network 2
The Animals of Farthing Wood	RTÉ 1	Network 2

== Ongoing television programmes ==
=== 1960s ===
- RTÉ News: Nine O'Clock (1961–present)
- RTÉ News: Six One (1962–present)
- The Late Late Show (1962–present)

=== 1970s ===
- Sports Stadium (1973–1997)
- The Late Late Toy Show (1975–present)
- RTÉ News on Two (1978–2014)
- Bosco (1979–1996)
- The Sunday Game (1979–present)

=== 1980s ===
- Mailbag (1982–1996)
- Glenroe (1983–2001)
- Live at 3 (1986–1997)
- Saturday Live (1986–1999)
- Questions and Answers (1986–2009)
- Dempsey's Den (1986–2010)
- Marketplace (1987–1996)
- Where in the World? (1987–1996)
- Know Your Sport (1987–1998)
- Kenny Live (1988–1999)
- Fair City (1989–present)
- RTÉ News: One O'Clock (1989–present)

=== 1990s ===
- Would You Believe (1990s–present)
- Winning Streak (1990–present)
- Blackboard Jungle (1991–1997)
- Challenging Times (1991–2001)
- Prime Time (1992–present)
- The Movie Show (1993–2001)
- No Disco (1993–2003)
- Echo Island (1994–1999)

== Ending this year ==
- 1 September – Millionaire (1995)
- 1 September – Jump Around (1995)

== Deaths ==
- 21 September – Frank Hall, broadcaster, journalist, satirist and film censor

== See also ==
- 1995 in Ireland
