= Tubridy (radio show) =

Tubridy is a talk radio show, presented by Ryan Tubridy each weekday morning on RTÉ 2fm, from September 2010 until July 2015. Along with The Colm Hayes Show, which succeeded it on the schedules until 2013, Tubridy was intended as a long-term replacement for The Gerry Ryan Show.

== History ==
After finishing The Tubridy Show on RTÉ Radio 1 on 16 July 2010, Ryan Tubridy began presenting Tubridy on RTÉ 2fm on 20 August 2010, surprising listeners by starting the programme three days earlier that what was originally scheduled for 23 August. His first guest on the programme was Bono. Tubridy's RTÉ Radio 1 slot was filled by John Murray.

In March 2011, Majella O'Donnell, the wife of singer Daniel O'Donnell, spoke on the show about her battles with depression. In May 2011, the Broadcasting Authority of Ireland (BAI) upheld a complaint against Tubridy who called a paedophile a "monster" and "creature" and then said: "From what I gather these guys cannot be quote unquote cured ... only one way to deal with them, and that's physiological ... these guys should have bits taken off."

On 25 October 2011, Tubridy dressed up for Barnardos as Scarecrow from The Wizard of Oz and broadcast Tubridy from Teresa's House in County Wexford. On 8 December 2011, he broadcast his show live from the flagship Arnotts store on Henry Street to promote the Society of Saint Vincent de Paul Toy Appeal. On 28 March 2012, he broadcast live from Clonmel. Later that year, he reunited a lovelorn man with the girl of his dreams while also launching a search for Ireland's "Best Neighbour".

In January 2013, an interview with Paul McGrath left listeners worried about his welfare. On 8 May 2013, Tubridy celebrated his fortieth birthday by taking the show for a party to the 37!, a club on Dublin's Dawson Street. Only those who were forty themselves that year were invited.

== Ratings ==
Tubridy has become synonymous with declining listenership figures, a 40% collapse of which by 2011 coincided with increased listenership figures for its rival The Ray D'Arcy Show.

At the end of July 2015, it was announced that he would move back to RTÉ Radio 1.

Preceded by The Gerry Ryan Show; The Colm and Lucy Show	RTÉ 2fm's mid-morning show 2010 – 2015	Succeeded by TBA
