= The Trump Card =

Irish game show

The Trump Card is a game show that was broadcast on RTÉ One during the summer months of 2007 as a seasonal replacement for Winning Streak. Launched as the successor to Fame and Fortune (1996–2006), The Trump Card had its prize money funded by the National Lottery and its production costs paid by RTÉ. Laura Woods presented.

Although ratings were initially favorable, The Trump Card quickly became unpopular with viewers. Critics blamed the show's poor audience ratings on its repetitive and complicated format, and on the fact that The Trump Card was seen as a disappointing replacement for the hugely popular Fame and Fortune. Cancelled after its first season, The Trump Card was replaced in 2008 by The Big Money Game, the first season of which was also presented by Laura Woods.

| Preceded by Fame and Fortune | National Lottery summer game show on Telefís Éireann; 2007 | Succeeded by The Big Money Game |
