= The Big Money Game =

- Genre: Game show
- Created by: RTÉ Studios
- Starring: Laura Woods (2008); Derek Mooney (2009–11); Brian Ormond (2012–13); Sinead Kennedy (2012–13); Pippa O'Connor (2013)
- Composer: Ray Harman
- Country of origin: Republic of Ireland

Original release
- Network: RTÉ One
- Release: 14 June 2008 – August 24, 2013

The Big Money Game is an Irish game show, broadcast on RTÉ One on Saturday nights during the summer months of June, July and August as a seasonal replacement for Winning Streak. The successor to Fame and Fortune (1996–2006) and The Trump Card (2007), The Big Money Game was first broadcast on Saturday, 14 June 2008. As with Winning Streak, production costs for the programme are paid by RTÉ and the prize money is funded by the Irish National Lottery. Entry to the game show is based on getting three "lucky stars" on associated National Lottery scratchcards and submitting them for a televised drawing. Contestants can win cash prizes up to €250,000, as well as cars, holidays, and other prizes.

The first series was presented by Laura Woods. The Big Money Game returned on 13 June 2009 for a second 13-week series with Derek Mooney as presenter. Within a few weeks, Ciarán Hyland, the Wicklow Gaelic footballer, had won €124,000 during an appearance on the game show. The third season, also with Derek Mooney presenting, returned on 5 June 2010. Derek Mooney stepped down as presenter in 2011; he was succeeded by Brian Ormond and Sinead Kennedy.

On 17 August 2013 edition, Ormond's wife Pippa (née O'Connor) stood in for Sinead Kennedy, who was attending her close friend's wedding.

The show was cancelled in 2014.

Preceded by The Trump Card	National Lottery summer game show on Telefís Éireann; 2008–2014	Succeeded by Winning Streak

| games • Jokers Wild • Three of a Kind • Suit Pursuit • The Dock • Roulette • New York Winners • Next Weeks Players • The Shuffle • Safe Cracker • Ace Race • The Big Money Ball Game
