= JFK in Ireland =

Book by Ryan Tubridy

JFK in Ireland: Four Days That Changed a President
- Front cover of JFK in Ireland by Ryan Tubridy
- Author: Ryan Tubridy
- Language: English
- Subject: John F. Kennedy's 1963 visit to Ireland
- Publisher: HarperCollins
- Publication date: October 2010
- Publication place: Ireland
- Pages: 302

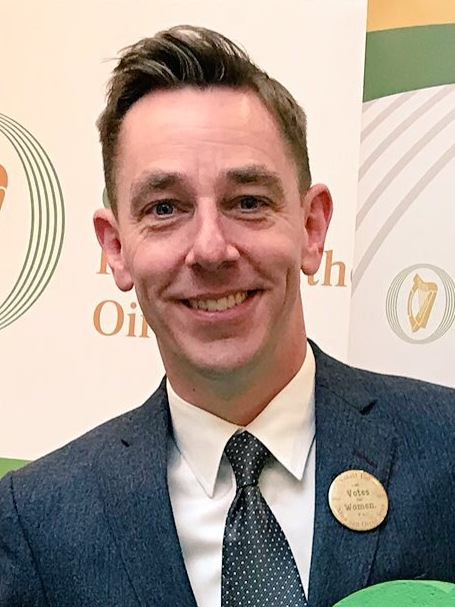
Writer Ryan Tubridy

JFK in Ireland: Four Days That Changed a President is the title of the first book written by Irish broadcaster Ryan Tubridy. Released in the UK in 2010, and by Lyons Press in the US in 2011, it is a profile of President of the United States John F. Kennedy's 1963 visit to Ireland.

A spokesperson for Eason & Son was reported to have called it "one of the most highly anticipated literary events of the year". Tubridy was exempted from paying income tax on his work, leading to criticism from politicians and the media. The broadcaster said he would send copies of the book to both the Kennedy family and the White House. The book contains photographs of Kennedy's visit.

A documentary, JFK: A Homecoming, by Ryan Tubridy was broadcast on RTÉ One prior to the book's release. Bernice Harrison, reviewing the week's television in The Irish Times, commented: "The timing of this history documentary – not the usual bank-holiday viewing, not an anniversary of the visit, no new revelations – was peculiar until you noted that RTÉ's star presenter has a book coming out this week about the JFK visit. Nice publicity if you can get it".

== Background ==
For more than €100,000 HarperCollins signed Tubridy as part of a two-book deal. They wanted an autobiography but he persuaded them otherwise. The broadcaster said he had thought about going back to college before taking on the task of writing this book.

== Overview ==
JFK in Ireland serves as a profile of John F. Kennedy's 1963 visit to Ireland while he was President of the United States. Kennedy referred to this visit as "the best 'four days of his life'" and it occurred five months before his assassination. Tubridy's book discusses how Kennedy's visit affected the country, wondering if it was an inspirational one and featuring rare photographs and personal documents.

== Research ==
While researching the book, Tubridy discovered that Éamon de Valera (then President of Ireland) had part of Kennedy's speech to Dáil Éireann erased from all records after finding its content offensive. Intended as a joke, the comment "Leinster House does not inspire the brightest ideas" led to a "dressing down" for Kennedy and Taoiseach Seán Lemass to question this "utter suppression" by de Valera. Contrary to Tubridy's claim, however, the full text of the speech can be found on the Oireachtas website.

== Launch ==
JFK in Ireland was launched at the Mansion House, Dublin on 27 October 2010. There was some speculation beforehand over whether Aoibhinn Ní Shúilleabháin would make an appearance. She did and Tubridy posed for photographs alongside her. He described her as "my date for the evening" and would not confirm if there was any romance involved. Tubridy praised his family and requested applause be given for his friend and colleague Gerry Ryan who had died earlier that year.

The Irish Independent newspaper published two supplements based on Tubridy's research alongside input from historians Tim Pat Coogan and Diarmaid Ferriter on the day of the launch and the following day.

Tubridy signed copies of his book at Shop Street in Galway on 3 November 2010.

== Reception ==
Tubridy thought critics would give the book "a bit of a kicking" due to his own popularity. His girlfriend at the time, Aoibhinn Ní Shúilleabháin, commented: "The book looks brilliant - he [Tubridy] put an awful lot of work into it. It is a great product, and he is very proud of it. Even though I am not very interested in history myself, it is easy to see it is a wonderful book".

Deaglán de Bréadún of The Irish Times praised the photographs, describing them as "like going through a family album", but was less keen on Tubridy's writing skills: "Tubridy is a good writer, not a great writer, but it is the photographs that form the primary merit of this beautifully produced volume", he wrote.

Dubray Books reported that thousands of copies of JFK in Ireland were ordered in advance of the launch. The book entered the Eason bestseller list at number two but fell to number four in the second week, being beaten by sales of Paul Howard's latest Ross O'Carroll-Kelly book, a Jamie Oliver cookbook and Johnny Giles's autobiography. By 10 November, JFK in Ireland had sold 1,116 books.

In March 2012, Tubridy made his American television debut on MSNBC's Morning Joe, during which he discussed the book. His debut was received positively by industry professionals. Willie Geist, one of the presenters of the show, said Tubridy was ”the biggest star in Ireland and perhaps in that nation's history”.

== Tax controversy ==
JFK in Ireland was granted tax-free status, meaning that Tubridy did not have to pay any income tax on the estimated €480,000 he earned from the book. This decision was criticised due to Tubridy's perceived wealth and the large salary he receives from RTÉ. The Revenue granted it a "favourable determination". MEP Joe Higgins said: "The fact that Ryan Tubridy is claiming the exemption is ridiculous, there is no question about that. The rule should be changed, full stop."
