= Home run (disambiguation) =

A home run in baseball refers to a hit in which the batter successfully rounds all the bases on one hit.

Home run may also refer to:

== In entertainment and media ==
=== Film ===
- Homerun (film), a 2003 Singaporean film
- Home Run (film), a 2013 American film

=== Music ===
- Homerun (Gotthard album), 2001, or the title track
- "Home Run" (Misha B song), 2012
- "Home Run" (Joe Nichols song), 2021
- Homerun (The Kelly Family album), 2004
- Homerun EP, a 2009 EP by The Baseball Project
- Homerun (Paulo Londra album), 2019, or the title track
- "Home Run", a song by Geoff Moore and the Distance
- "Home Run", a song by Bic Runga for Red Sunset
- "Home;Run", a song by Seventeen from their 2020 EP Semicolon

=== Other entertainment and media ===
- Home Run (video game), a game for the Atari 2600 developed by Bob Whitehead
- Colm and Jim-Jim's Home Run, an Irish television gameshow

== Military ==
- Home Run (call sign) US Navy call sign for the Gearing-class destroyer USS Leary (DDR-879)
- Project HOMERUN, a US aerial intelligence operation against USSR in 1956-60
- Camp Home Run, an American Army World War II "Cigarette Camp" located near Le Havre, France and named after a then-popular American cigarette brand

== Other uses ==
- Homerun Range, a mountain range in Antarctica
- Home Run Inn, a pizzeria chain in the Chicago, Illinois metropolitan area
- In the baseball metaphors for sex, a home run means achieving sexual intercourse on a date
