= Fame and Fortune (game show) =

Irish television program

- Genre: Game show
- Starring: Marty Whelan
- Country of origin: Ireland
- Original language: English

Production
- Production location: Donnybrook, Dublin
- Running time: 60 minutes

Original release
- Network: RTÉ One
- Release: 1996 – 2006

Fame & Fortune is a game show broadcast on RTÉ One on Saturday nights between 1996 and 2006. Presented by Marty Whelan (who signed off every show with the catchphrase: "How do you play? You buy a ticket."), the show aired during the summer months of June, July, and August as a seasonal replacement for Winning Streak. It was preceded by Millionaire, also hosted by Whelan, and succeeded by The Trump Card in 2007, hosted by Laura Woods.

Fame & Fortune had its production costs funded by RTÉ and its prize money funded by Ireland's National Lottery. Entry to the show was based on National Lottery scratchcards, and contestants could win cash, cars, holidays, and other prizes. Fame & Fortune had its final season in the summer of 2006. Its 2007 replacement, The Trump Card, was itself replaced a year later by The Big Money Game.

== Format ==
The format of the final series ran as follows: All series of it will be RTE Player Christmas 2021 to mark 60 years of television.

=== Part one ===
==== Famous Faces ====
As each contestant was interviewed, they picked one of five "scrolls", which denoted a famous character (real and fictitious) from history, who was their "guide" for their game on the touchscreen. They chose between Helen of Troy, Robin Hood, Christopher Columbus, Julius Caesar and Fionn Mac Cumhail. They played three games from a number stored in the computer; these included:

==== Trapdoor ====
The "guide" stood on a trap door in front of five lights. The player pressed one of these lights, hoping not to choose the trap door and see their guide fall into the pit, but to instead reveal cash prizes, and accumulate as much money as possible. It was similar to the Goldmine game on Winning Streak.

==== Odd One Out ====
Two different cash amounts were hidden in four different panels. The player chose three of them, winning the amount that did not match.

==== On the Menu ====
There were five different "food items" on the board, three with cash inside, and two that were empty. The player had three choices, so they were guaranteed at least one cash prize from this game.

==== Higher or Lower ====
Host Marty Whelan revealed a "base" number on the screen, and the player moved across the board, guessing whether the next number was higher or lower than the base number, rather than higher or lower than each other.

=== Part two ===
==== Spin Spin Spin ====
After the commercial break, the player with the lowest amount of money from "Famous Faces" played this game. If there were two people with the same amount, then it went to the bubble to decide the identity of the wheel-spinning contestant. They spun a wheel with cash prizes ranging from €5,000 to €20,000. The player could repeatedly spin the wheel until they landed on an amount that was lower than the last one. As Whelan put it: "You stop when you drop". There were several segments on the wheel which have a car on it. If the player landed on a car, they won it instead and the game ended.

==== The Fortunate 5 ====
The draw for the following week's players. The same as Winning Streak, with five names pulled from a drum.

==== Around the World ====
A globe was displayed on the screen, with 24 destinations around the world displayed on either side. A Winning Streak style bubble machine chose the player who chose a destination, which can move them either 1, 2 or 3 spaces along the board. There were seven spaces on each player's board with the aim being to be the first to reach the seventh space, the "dateline". As they completed their turn, they also received a prize of either cash or a holiday. One destination also contained a car, whilst six more contained a euro symbol (€) which added another €250,000 ball to the final game, the "Fortune Globe".

==== Fortune Globe ====
The extra black €250,000 balls won on "Around the World" were placed into the large bubble machine, along with a large number of other balls numbered €10,000, €12,000, €15,000, €20,000, €30,000, €40,000, €50,000, and €100,000. Eventually, after a certain length of time, one ball was selected from this machine, and the player had its amount added to their final total.

Preceded by Millionaire	National Lottery summer game show on Telefís Éireann; 1996–2006	Succeeded by The Trump Card
