= Millionaire (Irish game show) =

- Genre: Game show
- Presented by: Marty Whelan
- Country of origin: Ireland
- Original language: English
- No. of series: 1
- No. of episodes: 16

Production
- Production locations: RTÉ Television Centre, Donnybrook, Dublin 4
- Running time: 30–40 minutes

Original release
- Network: RTÉ One
- Release: 19 May – 1 September 1995

Related
- Fame and Fortune (1996–2006); Winning Streak (1990–present)

Millionaire is a game show presented by Marty Whelan. The studio-based show aired on Friday nights as a summer "filler" between 19 May and 1 September 1995.

== Format ==
Millionaire was produced in association with the National Lottery. Entry to the show was by collecting a particular sequence on special Millionaire scratch cards and each week four contestants competed for the chance to win up to £100,000. The final show saw each of the fifteen contestants, who won through the weekly rounds, compete for £1 million.

All programmes of it will be on RTE Player Christmas 2021 to celebrate 60 years of television.

Preceded by N/A	National Lottery summer game show on Telefís Éireann; 1995	Succeeded by Fame and Fortune
