= Colm Hayes =

Irish radio broadcaster

- Born: Colm Caffrey; Santry, Dublin, Ireland
- Education: Our Lady of Victories BNS, Ballymun
- Occupation: Radio Presenter/ Radio Broadcaster / Radio DJ
- Employer: Ireland’s Classic Hits Radio
- Known for: The Strawberry Alarm Clock; The Colm & Jim-Jim Breakfast Show; Colm and Jim-Jim's Home Run; The Colm and Lucy Show; The Colm Hayes Show; Colm and Lucy In The Morning
- Term: Co-Host with Lucy Kennedy of The Colm & Lucy in the Morning ( breakfast show on Ireland’s Classic Hits Radio) 2021-present

Colm Caffrey, known professionally as Colm Hayes, is an Irish radio broadcaster and sometimes television presenter. He formerly presented weekend breakfasts on RTÉ 2fm.

Hayes had a 10-year radio partnership with James "Jim-Jim" Nugent, beginning on The Strawberry Alarm Clock on FM104 where the pair established themselves as the number one breakfast show in Dublin. The pair moved to national broadcaster RTÉ 2fm to host The Colm & Jim-Jim Breakfast Show. While there they also did Colm and Jim-Jim's Home Run on RTÉ One. When Gerry Ryan died in 2010, Hayes split up with Jim-Jim Nugent and presented The Colm and Lucy Show with Lucy Kennedy for a time before breaking off on his own and moving to his current timeslot.

Since 2021, He presents Colm and Lucy In The Morning along with Lucy Kennedy on Ireland's Classic Hits Radio

== Private life ==
His real name is Colm Caffrey. He attended Our Lady of Victories BNS in Ballymun, and St. Aidan's C.B.S. in North Dublin, Ireland. He is the youngest of four siblings. His wife was from Belfast and died in 2025 after a six year battle with cancer. His dog Rocky, born in July 2009, is a brother of the dog owned by Adrian Wreckler, Digital Editor of The Sunday Business Post. Hayes smokes cigarettes.

== Early career (1980s – 2000) ==
Born in Santry, Hayes began his radio career on pirate radio. He broadcast with KELO, Q102 and Energy 103 and the immensely popular Radio Nova during the 1980s. Following the pirate stations ultimate closure by regulators, he worked at the state broadcaster 2FM on the late night shifts. Colm then got the weekday lunchtime slot. He left 2FM during the summer of 1989 for the first licensed commercial radio station Dublin's Capital Radio (now called FM104 ). After its launch, Colm Hayes was Capital Radio's first weekday breakfast show presenter. In 1996, Colm became the second anchor presenter of The Strawberry Alarm Clock on FM104, after the departure of Timmy Ryan.

== Partnership with Jim-Jim Nugent (2000–2010) ==
Following the addition of Nugent to The Strawberry Alarm Clock in 2000, the show would prosper with the pair dominating the timeslot in Dublin and winning several awards.

In 2007, the pair joined RTÉ 2fm to host the breakfast show reportedly at the behest of Gerry Ryan who was worried with the turbulent breakfast slot which preceded his show and had been marred by poor listenership. It was reported in 2011 that RTÉ paid combined fees of nearly €500,000. Their departure from FM104 was acrimonious with the pair escorted from the station's building and blocked from using the "Alarm Clock" reference in their new show, instead settling for The Colm & Jim-Jim Breakfast Show.

Whilst initial listenership was healthy, an overall decline in figures for breakfast shows with Ireland's declining economic fortunes (and, as a result, there been less commuters), the pair did not enjoy the same success as previously. The pair did, however, enjoy a television debut with Colm and Jim-Jim's Home Run which was picked up for international distribution.

== Partnership with Lucy Kennedy (2010) ==
The 2010 death of Gerry Ryan led to the break-up of the 10-year relationship of Colm Hayes and Jim-Jim Nugent. Whilst initially a temporary move, Hayes went on to host The Colm and Lucy Show with Lucy Kennedy in Ryan's place until a revamp from RTÉ later in the year. Nugent departed the station before the revamp, declining a new time slot at the station and returned to FM104.

== The Colm Hayes Show (May 2010-August 2010 -RTÈ 2FM) ==
Hayes then hosted the 11-1 show, following on from Ryan Tubridy's Tubridy programme which replaced Ryan.

In 2011, Hayes gained listeners in the JNLRs. On 11 November 2011, RTÉ revealed that Hayes had earned €213,954 from RTÉ in 2009, the organisation's tenth highest earner. Jim-Jim, paid less than half this figure before he departed RTÉ, was reported to have been "shocked" to learn of this, describing it as a "mystery", a "betrayal" and suggesting that "RTE is run like Willy Wonka's Chocolate Factory".

Hayes does do a singles night. He penned a UEFA Euro 2012 single called "Put Your Green Cape On" for Jedward.

It was announced in December 2016 he would spend three weeks covering for John Clarke on Radio Nova 100 that month.

== Partnership with Lucy Kennedy on Radio Nova 100FM (Ireland) ==
Colm Hayes officially joined Radio Nova 100FM (Ireland) as its Programming Director in June 2017. On 18 April 2018 Colm co-hosted the first edition of a new breakfast show on Radio Nova 100FM (Ireland) with Lucy Kennedy, called The Colm and Lucy Breakfast Show. Some months prior to this launch, they had presented a one-off show on Radio Nova 100FM (Ireland).
