= All Kinds of Everything (game show) =

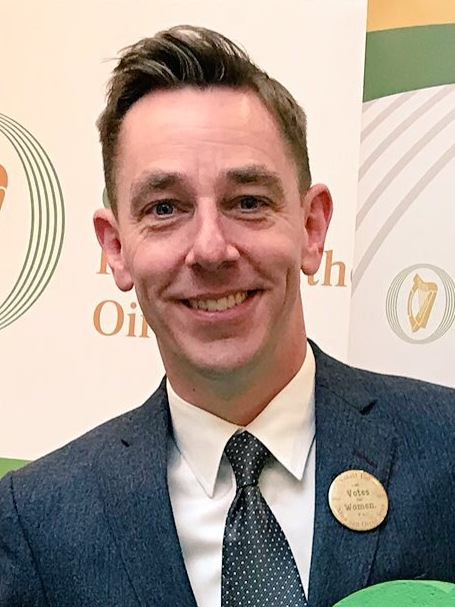
- Ryan Tubridy (pictured in 2018), presenter
- Genre: Light entertainment
- Presented by: Ryan Tubridy
- Starring: Mario Rosenstock
- Country of origin: Ireland
- Original language: English
- No. of series: 2
- No. of episodes: 16

Production
- Production locations: RTÉ Television Centre, Donnybrook, Dublin 4
- Camera setup: Multi-camera
- Running time: 30 minutes

Original release
- Network: RTÉ One
- Release: 1 September 2003 – 23 July 2004

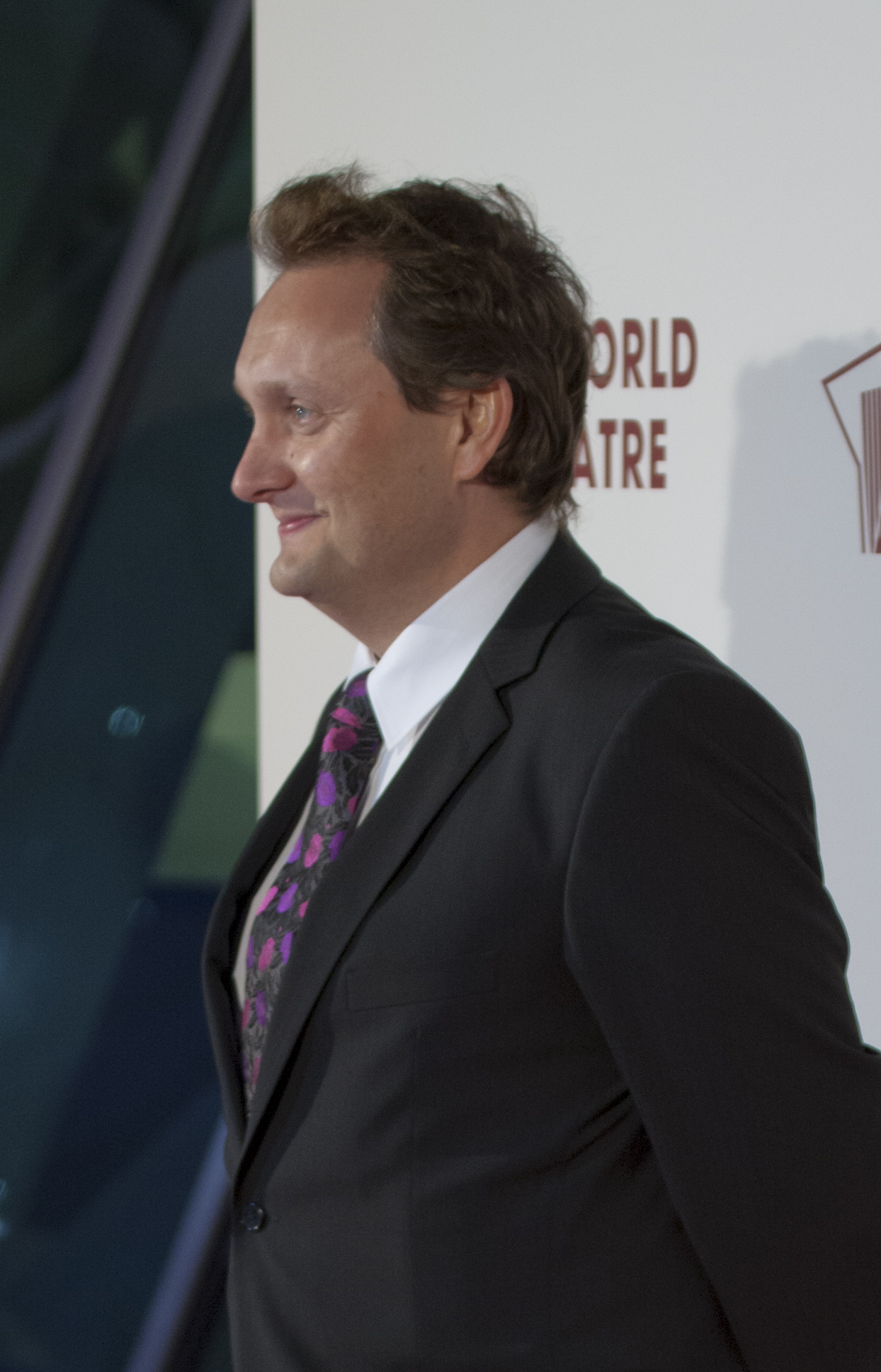
Mario Rosenstock featured

All Kinds of Everything is an Irish popular culture-based quiz show hosted by Ryan Tubridy and featuring Mario Rosenstock. The show was broadcast on RTÉ One for two series in 2003 and 2004. The show's name is taken from Dana's song All Kinds of Everything, the winning entry from Ireland in the Eurovision Song Contest 1970.

It was a series that featured many classic television adverts and clips.
