= Fiona Looney =

Irish writer and media personality

- Occupations: Journalist, playwright
- Spouse: Steve
- Children: Ciara, Cian, Uainín

Fiona Looney is an Irish columnist, playwright, scriptwriter and media personality.

== Personal life ==
Looney was brought up in a Catholic family in the Greenhills region of south Dublin. She has spoken about having been sexually assaulted on two occasions, while a child and as a young adult.

== Career ==
Looney began her career as a writer for the Irish political music magazine Hot Press, before going on to a career with BBC Radio in London, England, during the 1990s. She regularly contributed to The Gerry Ryan Show on RTÉ 2fm until the death of Gerry Ryan in 2010.

She was previously a regular contributor to topical comedy show The Panel. Looney's other television credits include working as a reporter for news programme Capital D and presenting two series of the travel series Voyager on RTÉ. Looney is also the creator of Celebrity Bainisteoir, having first submitted the idea to RTÉ in 2004. As a screenwriter, she has contributed to the television shows The Fast Show, No Limits, This Is Ireland, and You're a Star, among others.

Looney writes columns for the newspaper Irish Daily Mail and magazine Woman's Way. Her newspaper columns provided the material for her first book, Misadventures in Motherhood: Life with The Small Girl, The Boy and The Toddler (2005). She is also a playwright. Her debut play Dandelions was a commercial success and focused on the lives of women in suburban Ireland; it became the first in a trilogy of plays.
