= Colm & Jim-Jim =

Irish radio duo

Colm & Jim-Jim are an Irish radio duo.

== Radio personalities ==
- Colm Hayes, (born Colm Caffrey) an Irish radio and television personality
- Jim-Jim Nugent, an Irish radio and television personality

== Radio shows ==
- The Colm & Jim-Jim Breakfast Show, a 2fm radio show presented by Hayes and Nugent
- The Strawberry Alarm Clock, an FM104 radio show that launched the Hayes and Nugent professional partnership

== TV shows ==
- Colm and Jim-Jim's Home Run, an RTÉ One game show presented by Hayes and Nugent
