= The Colm & Jim-Jim Breakfast Show =

Irish radio show

The Colm & Jim-Jim Breakfast Show was an Irish breakfast radio show, broadcast weekdays on RTÉ 2fm. The show, hosted by Colm Hayes and Jim-Jim Nugent, began broadcasting in March 2007 when the duo moved from rival station FM104.

The Colm & Jim-Jim Breakfast Show was on air from 6 am to 9 am, Mon-Fri, directly before 2fm's flagship show, The Gerry Ryan Show. It placed sixteenth in a survey of national radio listenership figures taken between June 2007 and June 2008, with 202,000 adult listeners. The show is in direct competition with The Ian Dempsey Breakfast Show which airs on Today FM, and placed 12th in the same survey. Each Saturday morning a compilation of "best bits" from the previous week was broadcast between 9 am and 10 am. The Colm & Jim-Jim Breakfast Show was Ireland's third (3rd) most popular podcast in 2007, with 601,203 downloads. In 2008, The Colm & Jim-Jim Breakfast Show's listenership figures were reduced by 5,000 to 197,000.

== Transfer from FM104 ==
=== Change in listenership ===
The move from FM104 represented a change in listenership for Hayes and Nugent as 2fm broadcasts nationally whilst FM104 reaches only listeners in Dublin.

=== Naming rights ===
In initial promotional material, the new breakfast show was referred to as the 2fm Alarm Clock in reference to the duo's previous show The Strawberry Alarm Clock. However, when FM104 threatened legal action the name was dropped in favour of the current moniker.

=== Previous 2fm breakfast shows ===
The duo's new slot led to the axing of Orla Rapple's Early Show and replaced Marty in the Morning in the 2fm breakfast slot. Since Ryan Tubridy left The Full Irish and defected to RTÉ Radio 1, the station had struggled to replace him in a difficult period which also saw the short-lived The Rick & Ruth Breakfast Show axed after six months due to declining listenership figures. Prior to this difficulties arose when 2fm's breakfast host, Ian Dempsey moved to Today FM. He now presents a rival breakfast show with the commercial station.

== The 2fm show ==
=== Overview ===
The Colm & Jim-Jim Breakfast Show was launched with sponsors Halifax. In 2007, The Colm and Jim-Jim Breakfast Show added 100,000 new listeners to their breakfast show. Whilst on 2fm the duo won an RTÉ Guide Award for "Favourite Radio Show", following the seven PPI Awards they earned whilst working on 104's Strawberry Alarm Clock for FM 104. Nugent spoke of the strictness that was rife at his now NEW workplace:

"You know when we left 104 they wouldn't let us take our awards with us. I had to sneak in at six in the morning, take them out of the cabinet and put them all on a table together and take a picture of them and stick it on my blog. It was up there for ages before they realised we were leaving."

By September 2008, an additional 24,000 listeners had been added.

=== Controversies ===
==== Obama sniper assassination controversy ====
The pair were heavily criticised for mocking Barack Obama on 20 January 2009, including suggestions that the forty-fourth President of the United States would be shot by snipers during his inauguration ceremony. In the build-up to the inauguration they laughed and made jokes on air about the President-elect having to avoid snipers by doing the locomotion on stage. Describing how the transfer of power would take place in a matter of seconds, Hayes said:

They don't want to give yer man enough time to focus his sniper rifle.

Nugent quickly replied

Oh will ya stop

but later proceeded to join in the joke as Hayes continued:

And watch Barack Obama, he's moving all the time.

Nugent commented:

Everyone's doing this that he's going to get shot.

Hayes continued:

Seriously, they say it's the first inauguration where everybody on the stage will be constantly doing the locomotion.

The two presenters laughed at this and Nugent claimed:

We should be doing the commentary.

At that point they began to cheer and sing the locomotion, adding in the line "keep moving Obama". Finally Hayes referred to the removal of Obama's predecessor George W. Bush:

It's the moment when he [Obama] puts the crown on. That's what I want to see and then he turns to George Bush and he pulls out a big stick and chases him down the capitol lawn.

=== Mikey Graham incident ===
RTÉ was forced to air an apology at 9.30pm on 21 August 2009 for "allowing coarse and offensive language to be used" on The Colm & Jim-Jim Breakfast Show during a discussion about Boyzone singer Mikey Graham. ....

== Regular features ==
=== Jim-Jim's Dad ===
"Jim's Dad" is a game in which Nugent's father gives a new cryptic clue each Monday. Listeners are invited to call the show and submit their guesses - three are granted to the listenership per day - and they will be deemed correct or false. If false Nugent's father will express his disapproval. The prize is a minimum of €50, a further sum of that amount is added each day. The first two clues were: "It's something I own, I'd say most families have one." The second clue was: "I keep mine in the house". The kitty is currently €1400.

=== Kids Go Crazy in the Car ===
At 8.25am, Hayes and Nugent phone a child who is usually in a car on their way to school. The child is asked to do something impossible to tell on radio, i.e. stand on their head.

=== One More Song Before I Get Up ===
"One More Song Before I Get Up" is one more song before the listeners arise from their nightly slumber. It generally occurs around 6.40 am each day.

=== The Pop Quiz ===
"The Pop Quiz" is a best of three phone-in competition in which Hayes plays directly against a caller. Nugent plays three songs, during which after each both the title and artist must be correctly guessed by Hayes or the competitor. If they answer wrongly they are frozen out. a girl called Norah Hendrick was the last contestant to beat Jim Jim before he moved to 2FM

=== Roll Call ===
Each Monday Colm and Jim-Jim take a call with a class representative and grant said person 30 seconds to list off everyone on their class roll and say hello to their friends. They then win a Colm and Jim-Jim schoolbag.

=== Telly Bits ===
"Telly Bits" is an 8- to 10-minute slot occurring after the 7 am news update at approximately 7:10 am during which Lindy, Colm and Jim-Jim discuss that evening's television highlights.

Preceded by Marty in the Morning	RTÉ 2fm's breakfast show 2007 – 2010	Succeeded by Breakfast with Hector
