= Avril Hoare =

Irish journalist

Avril Hoare is an Irish journalist.

Hoare began her a career as a freelance contributor on the radio 2fm's Drivetime show before joining the station as a regular contributor. She has worked in the RTÉ newsroom since 1999. She has also been a presenter of 2fm news, a reporter on RTE Radio 1's News at One, a part of 2fm's The Full Irish team, a presenter on 2fm's Newsbeat and a presenter on RTE Radio 1's This Week. She was working behind the camera in 2020 as a programme editor of the RTE children's news program, news2day.

== Career ==
Hoare has worked in the RTE Newsroom since 1999. In 2001, she became part of 2fm's The Full Irish team. She was also a stand-in for Gerry Ryan in his absence from Irish radio. In 2003, 2fm created the half-hour programme, Newsbeat, to be presented by Hoare. She was still in the role in 2005 and 2006.

In September 2006, following a shake-up at the network, she was scheduled to present the program "Here Comes the Weekend". On 13 January 2007, the Irish Independent reported that her show had been axed but three days later it reported that she would "continue to present her popular Friday evening show" following another shakeup at the network. In 2007, Hoare was one of a number of Irish journalists and broadcasters to judge the "3 Student Media Awards".

In 2011, Hoare was working in RTE Radio 1's "This Week" as a reporter/presenter when she interviewed producer Butch Vig on the 20th anniversary of Nirvana's Nevermind.

As of 2020, Hoare and Anne-Marie Smyth were programme editors of RTE children's news program, news2day.

== Personal life ==
About 1999, Hoare bought a house in Dublin's North Strand that she dubbed her Coronation Street house. In 2000, she took part in a challenge to hike 200 km across the Czech Republic with Scouting Ireland.
