= The Full Irish =

Irish breakfast radio show

The Full Irish is a radio breakfast show on RTÉ 2fm. It ran for three years, from 2002 to 2005, and was on air from 7 – 9 am. Ryan Tubridy presented; Shane O'Donoghue read out the leading news in sport and Avril Hoare read out the news. The "holy moley mug" was the main prize given out in competitions. It was a lighthearted show which discussed random topics.

The Full Irish began on Monday 18 March 2002 as an attempt by RTÉ to halt the haemorrhaging of listeners who were deserting Damien McCaul's breakfast show.

Tubridy once heard a story on an early morning news bulletin about students in Canada who skinned a cat. Throughout the rest of the show, he imitated the cat with comments such as "Meow, please don't skin me" and "It hurts so much when you skin me". The next day, when talking about the hunting ban in England, Tubridy made reference to "the filthy felines".

| Preceded by Damien McCaul | RTÉ 2fm's breakfast show 2002–2005 | Succeeded by The Rick & Ruth Breakfast Show |
