= Colm and Jim-Jim's Home Run =

Irish game show

- Also known as: Home Run
- Genre: Game show
- Country of origin: Ireland
- Original language: English
- No. of seasons: 1
- No. of episodes: 6

Production
- Running time: 60 minutes

Original release
- Network: RTÉ One
- Release: 16 November – 21 December 2008

Colm and Jim-Jim's Home Run is a game show broadcast on RTÉ One on Sunday evenings after the Six One News. It was presented by, respectively, Colm Hayes and Jim-Jim Nugent. First aired on Sunday 16 November 2008 at 18:30, it was a creation of Vision Independent Productions. Contestants could win €25,000 without answering a single question. To promote the show the presenters appeared on chat show Tubridy Tonight the night before the first episode was broadcast. The programme received mostly negative reviews from critics. However the format of the show was purchased by Fremantle Media, and is now available for international distribution, with interest from the UK and US, with Colm and Jim-Jim receiving interest to host a UK version

The show was axed due to RTÉ cutbacks in June 2009.

== Format ==
An elderly lady named Liz showed what items are needed for this week's shopping list (first announced by the presenters on their radio show the previous Friday). She placed them one by one on the counter of her sweet shop. "Drop the Prop" saw a prop dropped from the ceiling with the numbers 1–5 in a circle upon it. An audience member was then asked to pick a number which was torn off by one of the presenters to reveal one of five names. The person corresponding to that name was invited down from the audience to play the game.

Another prop was dropped against a background of the show's theme music. It contained the numbers 1-5 as well, this time with five separate topics. The contestant chooses their number and thus their topic. Typical topics were Shakespeare, Colin Farrell and U2.

A selection of skypers was scrolled randomly along a large screen in the studio. The contestant had thirty seconds to either refuse ("next") or choose ("I want you"). The contestant had to answer a question based on the chosen topic. If they answered correctly they won money for themselves and the contestant. Either way another similar prop was soon dropped. This contained five challenges. "Random Guy" gave a demonstration of the chosen topic, e.g. sticking pins up his nose. The skyper had to then successfully complete this task within a specific time limit to win more money for themselves and the contestant. If successful the contestant remained to play the next round but another skyper was chosen. If unsuccessful another contestant was chosen via the same route and the game begins again. There were other random inserts such as "Celebrity Skyper" and one where Jim-Jim asked an audience member what a skyper could do.

Colm clutches the prop, a central component of the show.

Colm and Jim-Jim watch Random Guy as he attempts to eat pizza.

== Broadcasts ==
Celebrity Skyper	Date of transmission	Details
Lucy Kennedy	16 November 2008	Details
Rosanna Davision	23 November 2008	Details
Joe Duffy	30 November 2008	Details
Keith Barry	7 December 2008	Details
Mundy	14 December 2008	Details
Republic of Loose	21 December 2008	Details
