= The Tubridy Show =

Irish talk-based entertainment radio programme

- Running time: 1 hour
- Country of origin: Ireland
- Languages: English, Irish
- Home station: RTÉ Radio 1
- Hosted by: Ryan Tubridy
- Produced by: Yvonne Judge; Deirdre Ní Fhloinn; Aonghus McAnally
- Recording studio: Donnybrook, Dublin
- Original release: 27 June 2005 – 16 July 2010
- Website: www.rte.ie/thetubridyshow/
- Podcast: Podcast

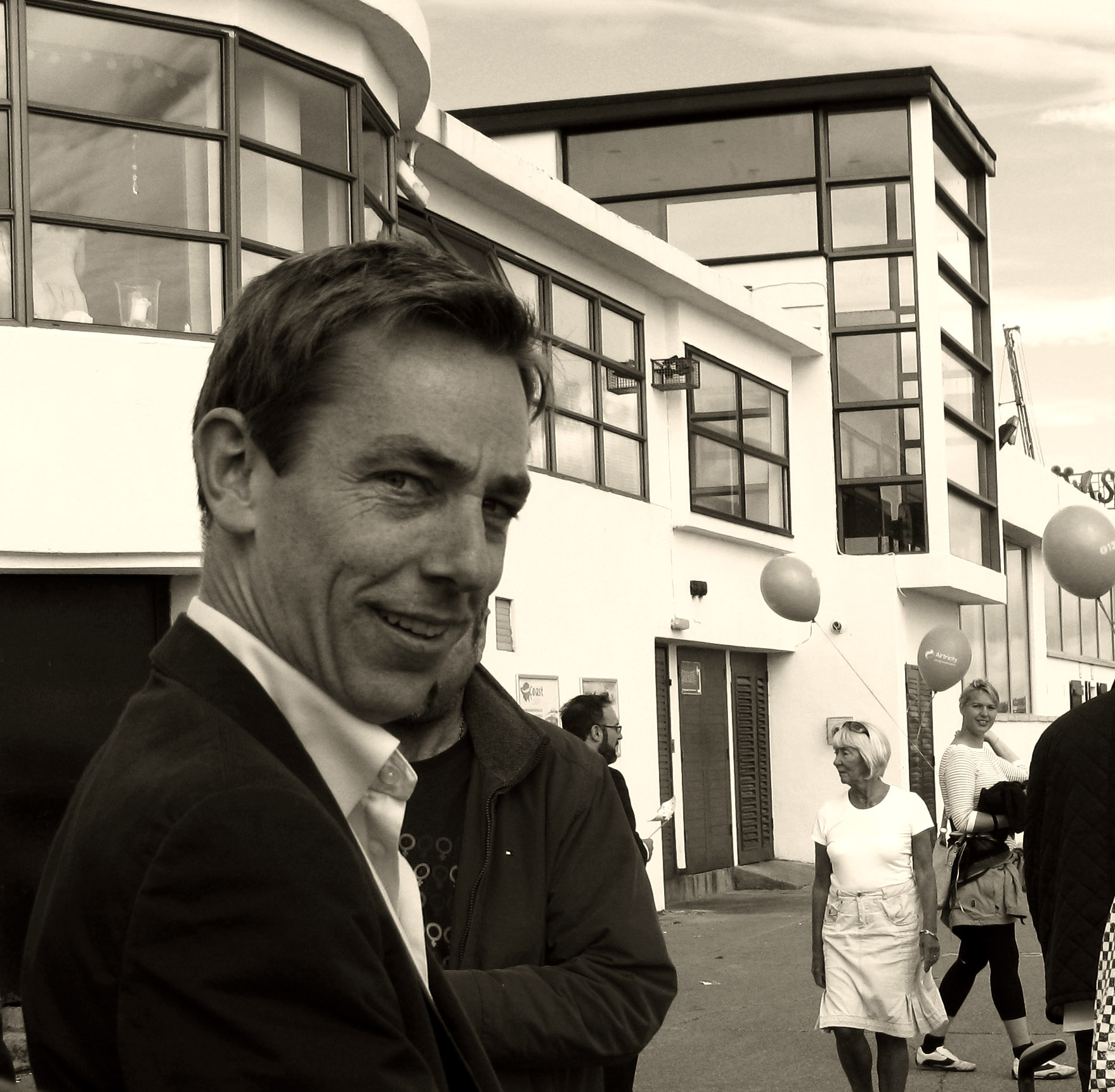
Ryan Tubridy was presenter (seen here in Bray on the last day of this show)

The Tubridy Show is an Irish talk-based entertainment radio programme presented by Ryan Tubridy. It was broadcast on Mondays to Fridays at 09:00 on RTÉ Radio 1.

Known for its influential book club, the programme attracted 333,000 listeners each morning as of May 2009. In Tubridy's absence, the programme was presented by Dave Fanning or Kathryn Thomas.

== History ==
The programme's first edition was broadcast on 27 June 2005, replacing Marian Finucane's The Marian Finucane Show, in a slot which she had occupied since 1999. The first guest that morning was Gavin Friday who reported in on the U2 concerts that had taken place that weekend in Croke Park. The programme was a two-hour show for the summer months before becoming a one-hour show from the start of September.

In 2006, the show's entire crew of producers and researchers were moved elsewhere.

In August 2009, Tubridy expressed shock on the show when Big Brother housemate Noirin Kelly declared before an interview that she had never heard of Tommy Tiernan.

In 2010, The Tubridy Show helped launch Ireland's Greatest, though Tubridy was displeased at some of the contents—"There are some really silly names in there. It's contentious to say the least".

=== End ===
After the death of Gerry Ryan, Tubridy was announced as the new presenter of Ryan's mid-morning slot on RTÉ 2fm. His RTÉ Radio 1 slot was to be filled by John Murray. On the final week of The Tubridy Show, the programme was broadcast from various seaside locations around Ireland. The Tubridy Show Bucket and Spade Tour took place in Bundoran, Salthill, Ballybunion, Tramore and Bray. The programme concluded on 16 July 2010. Five years later, Ryan returned to RTÉ Radio 1 in the same slot.

== Format ==
The programme began after the news, with an introduction and a piece of music. In each programme there were three sections. The first would last around 20 minutes with a debate or high-profile guest. For the second and third there would typically be a panel and a music guest.

Tubridy and his team concocted what they described as "an eclectic mix of items on a daily basis".

=== Book club ===
Every month the Tubridy Show Book Club was run. It encouraged listeners to send their review on a featured book. The best review would be published in the RTÉ Guide. The book club was influential in the Irish book market, with novels such as John Boyne's The Boy in the Striped Pyjamas receiving increased interest after being featured. It has been compared to the book club of British television personalities Richard and Judy.

== Listenership ==
The Tubridy Show recorded significant increases in its listenership figures. In May 2009, 18,000 additional listeners were reported, with a total of 333,000 tuning into the show each morning. That was a 6% increase on previous figures, to which the presenter reacted positively. The presenter said that the significant increase in listenership figures had come about at no better time—he had been offered the job of presenting The Late Late Show earlier that week.
