= National Lottery (Ireland) =

State lottery in Ireland

- Region: Ireland
- First draw: 27 March 1987
- Operator: Premier Lotteries Ireland
- Chief executive: Cian Murphy
- Regulated by: Regulator of the National Lottery (Carol Boate)
- Legislation: National Lottery Act, 1986; National Lottery Act, 2013
- Highest jackpot: €19,060,800 (Lotto, won 15 January 2022); €250,000,000 (Euromillions, won 17 June 2025)
- Odds of winning jackpot: Daily Million: 1 in 3,262,623; Lotto: 1 in 8,145,060; EuroDreams: 1 in 19,191,900; Euromillions: 1 in 139,838,160
- Shown on: RTÉ One
- Website: lottery.ie

The National Lottery (Irish: An Crannchur Náisiúnta) is the state-licensed lottery of Ireland. It began operations in March 1987 when it sold its first scratchcards. It launched the draw game Lotto the following year and now offers a wide variety of games, with most sales transacted through a nationwide retail network and the remainder made online. The minimum age to play all National Lottery games is 18, and almost 40 percent of Irish adults play regularly, with around 27 percent of sales funding designated good causes. The National Lottery has raised over €7 billion for good causes since its inception. In 2024, total National Lottery sales were €855.7 million, with almost €487.6 million returned in prizes and almost €239.3 million distributed to good causes. National Lottery prizes are tax-free and winners have the right to remain anonymous.

From 1986 to 2014, the state-owned An Post National Lottery Company operated the National Lottery. To raise funds during Ireland's post-2008 economic downturn, the Irish government sold the National Lottery licence for 20 years to a private operator, Premier Lotteries Ireland DAC (PLI), which was initially majority-owned by the Ontario Teachers' Pension Plan, with a minority stake held by An Post and An Post Pension Funds. PLI began operating the National Lottery in November 2014. In November 2023, the French lottery operator Française des Jeux (FDJ) acquired PLI in full.

== History and administration ==
In its 1984 economic plan, Building on Reality 1985–1987, the coalition government of Fine Gael and the Labour Party proposed to raise funds for sports by creating a new National Lottery. It passed the National Lottery Act 1986, which stipulated that National Lottery proceeds would fund sport and recreation, national culture, the arts, and community health. The government held a public tender process for the licence to operate the lottery. After its operators failed to win the licence, the Irish Hospitals' Sweepstake, which had been established in 1930 to finance hospitals, entered voluntary liquidation in March 1987.

The National Lottery's corporate logo from the late 1990s– 2008.

The government awarded the National Lottery licence to An Post National Lottery Company (Irish: Comhlacht Chrannchur Náisiúnta An Post), which was 80 percent owned by Ireland's state-owned postal services provider An Post and 20 percent owned by the Minister for Finance (later the Minister for Public Expenditure, Infrastructure, Public Service Reform and Digitalisation). The National Lottery licence was initially issued for a ten-year period, but in 1992 the licence term was extended to 31 March 2000 and was subsequently extended for an additional year. An Post National Lottery Company successfully retained the licence in 2001 as the only bidder, after two other applications were withdrawn. Ray Bates served as director of An Post National Lottery Company from its inception until he stood down in 2006. He was succeeded by the company's former chief operating officer, Dermot Griffin.

In 2011, during the country's post-2008 economic downturn, the Irish government included the National Lottery licence in a €3 billion privatisation drive agreed under the country's Economic Adjustment Programme. In April 2012, the government announced that it would sell a 20-year licence to operate the National Lottery, while ensuring that around 30 percent of lottery sales would still go to designated good causes. The National Lottery Act 2013 provided for the sale of the licence, eliminated some restrictions on Internet gambling to encourage online sales, and added the natural environment to the list of good causes eligible to receive National Lottery funding.

On 3 October 2013, the government announced the winning bid of €405 million from Premier Lotteries Ireland DAC (PLI), majority-owned by the Ontario Teachers' Pension Plan (then-owner of the Camelot Group, which operated the UK National Lottery from 1994 to 2024), with a minority stake held by An Post and An Post Pension Funds. The Italian-owned GTECH and Australian gambling operator Tatts Group also submitted bids for the licence. The government stated that half the proceeds from the sale would go towards construction of a new children's hospital while the other half would be used to pay down state debt and fund jobs programmes. The staff of An Post National Lottery Company were transferred to PLI, which began operating the National Lottery in November 2014. Griffin became CEO of PLI and continued in that role until 2019, when he was succeeded by former Paddy Power executive Andrew Algeo.

In March 2023, the Ontario Teachers' Pension Plan announced plans to sell its 78.6 percent stake in PLI. In July 2023, the French lottery operator Française des Jeux (FDJ), in its first lottery venture outside France, agreed to acquire PLI in full for €350 million. Due to a drag-along right, An Post and An Post Pension Funds were obliged to sell their minority 21.4 percent stake, meaning that, for the first time, the Irish state retained no ownership stake in the company running the National Lottery. The acquisition was completed in November 2023. PLI will operate the National Lottery until its 20-year licence expires in November 2034.

Following the acquisition, the National Lottery announced plans to move its headquarters from Dublin's Abbey Street, where it had been based since its inception. In the summer of 2024, the headquarters moved to 1 George's Quay, the former headquarters of Ulster Bank, which had recently ceased operating in the Republic of Ireland. In June 2024, Algeo stepped down as CEO and board member of PLI and was succeeded by Cian Murphy, formerly PLI's chief product and digital officer, who had previously held roles with The AA, Paddy Power, and McKinsey & Company. The National Lottery had 207 employees in 2023 and staff costs of €18.7 million.

=== Regulator of the National Lottery ===
The National Lottery Act 2013 established the office of the Regulator of the National Lottery, appointed by the Minister for Public Expenditure and Reform (as of 2025 titled the Minister for Public Expenditure, Infrastructure, Public Service Reform and Digitalisation). The regulator may serve a term not exceeding seven years and may be reappointed for one additional term. The first regulator appointed was Liam Sloyan, a former chief executive of the Health Insurance Authority, who took up the position on 17 November 2014. He was succeeded by Carol Boate, a former director of corporate services in the Competition and Consumer Protection Commission, whose appointment took effect on 9 October 2017.

=== Administrative and regulatory issues ===
The answer to a 2025 Dáil question listed ten sanctions imposed by the lottery regulator on PLI since 2015.

In 2015, representatives of PLI appeared before the Oireachtas Finance Committee to explain technological faults affecting the running of the National Lottery. One problem had delayed the midweek Lotto draw scheduled for 4 February 2015 until the following day, the first time a Lotto draw had been postponed.

In 2020, following an investigation, the National Lottery regulator found that PLI had breached three provisions of the National Lottery Act 2013, as well as its licence with the Irish state, by omitting top prizes totaling €180,000 from three scratchcard games, one held in 2015 and two held in 2019. The investigation found that the omissions were due to human error. PLI returned the prizes to consumers through a New Year's Special Draw and also made a €50,000 donation to a mental health charity.

In 2022, the Public Accounts Committee questioned PLI CEO Andrew Algeo regarding the company's use of unclaimed winnings between 2015 and 2021, an amount totaling over €124 million. PLI was criticized for allocating €120 million of this sum to marketing expenses while allocating less than €2 million towards top-up prizes. Algeo defended the marketing expenditure as necessary promotion for the lottery and stated that PLI had remained compliant with the licence terms. The committee also questioned lottery regulator Carol Boate over PLI's use of unclaimed winnings. Some members called Boate a "bystander" on the issue while Fine Gael TD Jennifer Carroll MacNeill criticised her for not seeking external legal advice.

Also in 2022, the regulator fined PLI €150,000 for breach of licence after it failed to bar some problem gamblers from online platforms, even though those users had elected to avail of a permanent self-exclusion option introduced in 2019. An investigation by the regulator identified 126 self-excluded users whose accounts had been deleted in error in October 2021, rather than permanently closed. Of these, 16 had subsequently opened new online accounts and 10 had resumed gambling on the platform. It was the first time PLI had been financially penalised due to problems identified by the regulator.

In 2024 the regulator withheld €23,000 from PLI for 394 prizes unclaimed over a six-week period in 2022 when the website's "Check My Numbers" facility mistakenly told some users their numbers had not won.

== Games ==
The National Lottery began gaming operations on 23 March 1987 when it launched its first scratchcards, selling an estimated 1 million on the first day of trading. Lotto was introduced in 1988 and Lotto Plus in 2000. The National Lottery now offers Lotto and Lotto Plus draws on Mondays, Wednesdays and Saturdays. It offers EuroMillions and Plus draws on Tuesdays and Fridays, EuroDreams draws on Mondays and Thursdays, and two Daily Million draws each day. It also runs a range of other games, including televised bingo, Millionaire Raffles, and online instant-win games.

Since the National Lottery's inception, tickets and scratchcards have been sold through a countrywide network of retailers. In 2009, the National Lottery introduced online sales. In 2023, around 84 percent of sales were transacted through the 5,195-member retail network and almost 16 percent were made online.

National Lottery prizes are paid out as tax-free lump sums, with the top two EuroDreams prizes paid as tax-free annuities. All prizes in Lotto, EuroMillions, EuroDreams, and Daily Million games must be claimed within 90 days of the applicable drawing dates. The minimum age for playing all National Lottery games is 18, and winners have the right to remain anonymous. All unclaimed prizes are retained by the National Lottery and are mostly used for marketing expenses.

Lotto logo in use from 2008 onwards

=== Lotto ===
Lotto, a six-number lottery game, is the National Lottery's longest-running draw game. It began as a 6/36 game, making the jackpot odds 1 in 1,947,792. The inaugural Lotto draw was held on Saturday, 16 April 1988, for a jackpot of £147,059, which was won by Brigid McGrath from Letterkenny, County Donegal. Following her win, McGrath was featured on the front pages of national newspapers and was a guest on The Late Late Show. Lotto draws continued weekly on Saturday nights until 30 May 1990, when the first midweek Lotto draw was held on Wednesday nights.

At its initial cost of £0.50 per line, all possible combinations in the 6/36 format could be purchased for £973,896. Polish-Irish accountant Stefan Klincewicz had been part of a ten-person syndicate from the Dublin pub Scruffy Murphy's that had won a £2.4 million Lotto jackpot in 1990, then the biggest lottery win in Europe. With Wexford businessman Paddy Kehoe, he set up another syndicate to attempt a brute force attack on the Lotto. When the jackpot reached £1.7 million for the May 1992 bank holiday drawing, and the National Lottery also announced a special £100 prize for each Match-4 winner, the syndicate attempted to buy up all possible combinations. The National Lottery limited the number of tickets each retailer could sell and disabled machines the syndicate was using heavily, but the syndicate still managed to purchase over 80 percent of the combinations, spending an estimated £820,000 on tickets. It had the winning numbers for the draw, but two other winning tickets were sold, meaning the syndicate received one-third of the jackpot, or £568,682. Match-5 and Match-4 prizes brought its total winnings to approximately £1,166,000, representing a profit of around £310,000 before expenses.

To prevent another brute force attack, the National Lottery changed Lotto to a 6/39 game for drawings beginning on 22 August 1992, raising the jackpot odds to 1 in 3,262,623. To compensate for the longer odds, it doubled the starting jackpot, added a bonus number to the drawings, and introduced new prizes for Match-5+bonus, Match-4+bonus, and Match-3+bonus. Anticipating competition in border counties when the UK National Lottery began operations on 14 November 1994, the National Lottery changed Lotto to a 6/42 game on 24 September 1994, making the jackpot odds 1 in 5,245,786. At the same time, it introduced computer-generated "quick picks" as an alternative to marking numbers on paper play slips.

Beginning on 26 September 1998, the National Lottery increased the cost of a line of Lotto from £0.50 to £0.75, doubled the game's starting jackpot to £1 million, and increased most of the game's smaller prizes by 50 percent. After Ireland adopted the euro currency on 1 January 2002, the cost of a line of Lotto became €0.95, and the starting jackpot became €1.269 million (the euro equivalent of £1 million). For draws beginning 1 September 2002, the price of Lotto was rounded to €1 per line, and the starting jackpot was raised to €1.35 million. In November 2006, after several years of declining sales, the National Lottery changed Lotto to a 6/45 game to create more rollovers and bigger jackpots. This made the jackpot odds 1 in 8,145,060. It raised the starting jackpot from €1.35 million to €2 million, increased the Match-5+bonus prize from €12,000 to €25,000, introduced a Match-3 prize of €5, and increased the price of Lotto from €1 to €1.50 per line.

In 2015, the National Lottery's new operator, Premier Lotteries Ireland, changed Lotto to a 6/47 game and increased the price from €1.50 to €2 per line. The change took effect for drawings beginning 3 September 2015 and made the jackpot odds 1 in 10,737,573. The Match-5+bonus prize was increased from €25,000 to what the operator stated would be an average of over €100,000. A Match-2+bonus prize was introduced, consisting of a two-line Daily Million quick pick with Plus.

For a record 63 consecutive Lotto draws from 9 June 2021 to 12 January 2022, no ticket matched all six numbers to win the jackpot, breaking the previous record of 22 consecutive rollovers. The jackpot reached a new all-time high of €19,060,800 on 29 September 2021. Under rules introduced in 2015, when a jackpot reached a new all-time high, it was capped at that level and funds that otherwise would have gone toward increasing the jackpot were divided among the next-highest prize tier that had winning tickets. In November 2021, after the jackpot had rolled over 46 consecutive times, Fine Gael TD Bernard Durkan demanded a "full investigation and audit ... in the interests of public confidence". A PLI spokesperson called the extended sequence of rollovers "unprecedented", noting that since Lotto had become a 6/47 game in September 2015, 80 percent of jackpots had been won within seven weeks. On 14 December 2021, National Lottery regulator Carol Boate and PLI representatives testified before the government's Joint Committee on Finance, Public Expenditure and Reform. Boate stated that no irregularities had been observed in Lotto draws and pointed out that other countries' lotteries had experienced similar extended sequences of rollovers. PLI chief executive Andrew Algeo stated that the operator was seeking regulatory approval for a "must-win" draw if a capped jackpot rolled over for an extended period.

In January 2022, the regulator gave approval for a Will-Be-Won draw, under which, if no ticket matched all six winning numbers, the outstanding jackpot would flow down to the winner(s) of the next prize tier. A Will-Be-Won draw was held on Saturday, 15 January 2022. Retail outlets were described as "manic" ahead of the draw, due to high demand for tickets, and the National Lottery's website and mobile app experienced outages due to heavy usage. A family syndicate from County Mayo matched all six numbers to win the €19,060,800 jackpot outright, after buying the winning quick-pick ticket at Laura's XL store in Castlebar. To prevent future capped jackpots from rolling over indefinitely, Lotto game rules were changed to require a Will-Be-Won draw no more than five draws after a jackpot cap has been reached.

For draws beginning 5 September 2026, the number of combinations was reduced for the first time in Lotto's history. It reverted to a 6/45 game, the format previously used from 2006 to 2015, which reduced the jackpot odds from 1 in 10,737,573 to 1 in 8,145,060. Average prizes below the jackpot tier were reduced, with the Match-5+bonus prize expected to be an average of €75,000, down from over €100,000. Prizes for a Match-3 and a Match-2+bonus were both fixed at €4. A third Lotto draw was added on Monday nights, starting on 7 September, increasing the frequency of the game to three times a week. The jackpot cap was reduced from its then all-time high of €19,060,800 to a fixed €16 million.

Ticket sales for Lotto close at 7:45 p.m. local time on draw nights and draws are live streamed on the National Lottery's website at 7:55 p.m. Results are announced on RTÉ One prior to RTÉ News: Nine O'Clock.

==== Lotto Plus ====
In 2000, the National Lottery introduced Lotto Plus as an add-on to the main Lotto game. For an extra £0.25 per line, players could enter their Lotto numbers in an additional 6/42 drawing for a fixed, non-rolling jackpot of £250,000. The first Lotto Plus drawing took place on 25 October 2000. For draws beginning 1 September 2002, the National Lottery added a second Lotto Plus drawing, renamed the drawings Lotto Plus 1 and Lotto Plus 2, and raised the cost of Lotto Plus to €0.50 per line. The jackpots were fixed at €300,000 and €200,000 respectively.

In November 2006, when Lotto became a 6/45 game, the National Lottery raised the Lotto Plus 1 and Lotto Plus 2 jackpots to €350,000 and €250,000 respectively. In September 2015, when Lotto became a 6/47 game, the National Lottery raised the top prize of Lotto Plus 1 to €500,000 and introduced Lotto Plus Raffle, which added a four-digit raffle code to each Lotto Plus ticket; all ticketholders who matched the winning code won a fixed prize of €300. It also introduced a Match-2+bonus prize of a two-line Daily Million quick pick in both Lotto Plus 1 and Lotto Plus 2.

On 30 August 2018, the cost of Lotto Plus was doubled to €1 per line, the first price increase in 18 years. The Lotto Plus 1 jackpot was doubled to €1 million while the Lotto Plus 2 jackpot remained at €250,000. The fixed prize for Lotto Plus Raffle was increased from €300 to €500, and the National Lottery introduced a special Lotto Plus Million Euro Raffle draw to be held several times a year, under which an additional €1 million would be evenly divided among all winning Lotto Plus Raffle tickets.

For draws beginning 5 September 2026, when Lotto became a 6/45 game with three drawings per week, Lotto Plus 1 and Lotto Plus 2 became identical games with the same fixed prizes. This meant that the top prize for Lotto Plus 2 increased from €250,000 to €1 million. Lotto Plus Raffle was discontinued at this time.

The odds of winning Lotto Plus jackpots are the same as the odds of winning the main Lotto jackpot. More than 90 percent of Lotto players also enter Lotto Plus. The minimum cost of playing Lotto with Lotto Plus is €6.

Lotto 5-4-3-2-1 logo in use from 2008 to 2026

==== Lotto Pick & Play ====
Lotto 5-4-3-2-1, a game based around the main Lotto draw, was introduced in February 1997. It allowed players to win prizes by correctly matching one, two, three, four, or five of the drawn numbers. The more numbers players tried to match, the greater the prize. Players could base their choices either on a six-number game (excluding the bonus number) or on a seven-number game (including the bonus number). The prizes for each possible outcome were fixed and did not depend on sales. The odds of winning the six-number game's top prize of €125,000 were 1 in 255,657. The odds of winning the seven-number game's top prize of €40,000 were 1 in 73,045.

In September 2026, Lotto 5-4-3-2-1 was renamed Lotto Pick & Play. Due to the number of balls in the main Lotto draw decreasing from 47 to 45, the odds and fixed prizes in Lotto Pick & Play also changed. The odds of winning the six-number game's top prize of €100,000 became 1 in 203,627. The odds of winning the seven-number game's top prize of €25,000 became 1 in 58,179.

=== EuroMillions ===
Euromillions logo in use from 2008 onwards.

The National Lottery joined the transnational EuroMillions lottery on 8 October 2004. As of June 2025, 18 EuroMillions jackpots have been won or shared in Ireland. On 31 July 2005, Dolores McNamara, a cleaning lady from Limerick, became the first Irish EuroMillions winner when she won a jackpot of €115 million, then the largest lottery prize ever won in Europe. On 19 February 2019, a family syndicate from North Dublin won a €175 million jackpot. On 17 June 2025, a family syndicate from Cork won a €250 million Euromillions jackpot, the largest jackpot ever won in Ireland. The winning ticket was sold at Clifford's Centra on Shandon Street in Cork. The odds of winning the EuroMillions jackpot are 1 in 139,838,160.

==== Ireland Only Raffle ====
For each EuroMillions line purchased in Ireland, the buyer receives a nine-character Ireland Only Raffle (IOR) code made up of four letters and five numbers. Ten IOR codes are selected on each EuroMillions draw night, with the winners receiving €5,000 each. In August 2021, the National Lottery awarded five IOR codes an extra €1 million each over the course of two weeks.

==== Plus ====
In June 2007, the National Lottery introduced "Plus," an add-on to the main EuroMillions game available only to Irish players. For an extra €1 per line, players can enter their five main EuroMillions numbers in an additional draw for a fixed, non-rolling jackpot of €500,000. Players can also win fixed prizes of €2,000 for a Match-4 and €20 for a Match-3. The odds of winning the Plus jackpot are 1 in 2,118,760.

=== EuroDreams ===
In October 2023, the National Lottery launched EuroDreams, a joint venture with the lotteries of seven other European countries—Austria, Belgium, France, Luxembourg, Portugal, Spain, and Switzerland. The National Lottery's first annuity-style game, EuroDreams features a top prize of €20,000 per month for 30 years. Players choose six numbers from 1 to 40 and a "Dream Number" from 1 to 5. Players who match all winning numbers, including the Dream Number, win the top prize; players who match the first six numbers, but not the Dream Number, win the second-tier prize of €2,000 per month for 5 years. Cash prizes ranging from around €100 to around €2.50 are paid for a Match-5, Match-4, Match-3, or Match-2.

EuroDreams tickets first went on sale on 30 October 2023, at a cost of €2.50 per line, with the first draw held on 6 November. Draws are held in Paris on Mondays and Thursdays at 9:00 p.m. local time (8:00 p.m. Irish time). An annuity prize may be paid only to an individual, not to a syndicate; if an annuity winner dies before the payment period concludes, the remaining outstanding amount will be paid as a lump sum to his or her estate. The odds of winning the EuroDreams top prize are 1 in 19,191,900.

=== Daily Million ===
In September 2012, the National Lottery introduced Daily Million to replace both Monday Million (a former draw game with prizes up to €1 million, held once weekly on Monday nights) and All or Nothing (a former daily draw game with prizes up to €500,000). A 6/39 lottery drawing with a fixed, non-rolling jackpot of €1 million, Daily Million took place once each day until April 2016. Since then, two draws have been held each day. Daily Million costs €1 per line to play. For an extra €0.50 per line, players can add Daily Million Plus for a top prize of €500,000. Draws take place at 2 p.m. and 9 p.m. each day, including weekends and bank holidays. The odds of winning the Daily Million and Daily Million Plus jackpots are 1 in 3,262,623.

=== Millionaire Raffle ===
In the summer of 2008, the National Lottery ran its first limited-edition Millionaire Raffle, selling 300,000 tickets at €20 each. The draw, which featured two top prizes of €1 million, was held on 26 August 2008 to coincide with the final evening of the Rose of Tralee festival. Millionaire Raffles took place occasionally at Easter, in the summer, and at Christmas until 2014. Since then, the Millionaire Raffle has taken place only at Christmas, with ticket sales opening on 1 November and the draw held on New Year's Eve. For the Christmas 2023 Millionaire Raffle, 600,000 tickets were sold at a cost of €25 each. The top prize was €1 million, with an additional 6 prizes of €100,000, 15 prizes of €10,000, 45 prizes of €5,000, 302 prizes of €1,000, and 8,131 prizes of €500.

=== Telly Bingo ===
The National Lottery introduced Telly Bingo in September 1999. Players buy tickets with 24 randomly generated numbers and can win prizes by matching the numbers drawn on a lunchtime TV show in a variety of patterns, with a prize of €10,000 for a full house. An additional €10,000 Snowball prize goes to someone who achieves a full house on or before the 45th number drawn. If not won, the Snowball prize rolls over to the next draw, allowing one additional number each time. Telly Bingo takes place three times a week, on Tuesdays, Thursdays and Fridays, with the Telly Bingo TV Gameshow broadcast on RTÉ One at 12.45 p.m.

=== Scratchcards and Instant Win Games ===
The National Lottery offers a wide range of scratchcard games and online instant-win games. These accounted for over €298 million in sales in 2022.

=== Game shows ===
The National Lottery has funded the prize money for televised game shows. Players who got three "lucky stars" on associated scratchcards could submit them for televised drawings, with the winners appearing as contestants on the game show. The National Lottery's flagship game show Winning Streak featured on RTÉ One on Saturday nights between 1990 and 2020. The programme suspended production in March 2020 due to the COVID-19 pandemic, and no date has been given for its resumption. Other televised game shows associated with the National Lottery have included Fame & Fortune, The Trump Card, The Big Money Game, and The Million Euro Challenge.

== References in other media ==
In the 1990s, RTÉ produced a sitcom called Upwardly Mobile about a working-class family who won the Lotto and moved to an upper-middle-class area. It ran for three seasons between 1995 and 1997.

Waking Ned (known as Waking Ned Devine in North America) is a comedy film set in a tiny rural village, based on a fictitious winner of the Lotto.

Beat the Lotto is a 2025 documentary about the Klincewicz/Scruffy Murphys syndicate's 1992 brute-force Lotto win.

An episode of the first series of RTÉ comedy Bridget & Eamon, features a syndicate playing and winning a jackpot in the National Lottery.
