= Ryan Tubridy =

Irish TV and radio presenter (born 1973)

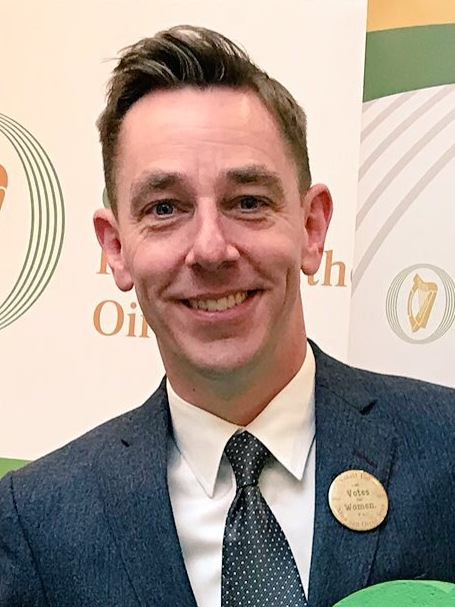
- Tubridy in 2018
- Born: 28 May 1973 (age 53); Booterstown, Dublin, Ireland
- Education: University College Dublin (BA)
- Spouses: Anne Marie Power (m. 2003; div. 2006); Clare Kambamettu (m. 2025)
- Children: 2
- Awards: Best Irish DJ, 2004 Meteor Awards; Best Male TV Presenter, TV Now Awards (2009); Dubliner of the Year (2009); Guaranteed Irish Person of the Year (2023); President's Medal, Library Association of Ireland (2023)
- Presenting career
- Show: The Ryan Tubridy Show
- Station: Times Radio
- Time slot: Sundays, 1pm to 4pm
- Show: The Ryan Tubridy Show on Sundays
- Stations: Q102, LMFM, Cork's 96FM and Live 95
- Time slot: Sundays, 10am to 12pm
- Style: Chat show, interviews, talk radio
- Country: Ireland
- Previous shows: The Late Late Show (2009 to 2023); The Ryan Tubridy Show on RTÉ Radio 1 (2015 to 2023); Tubridy on RTÉ 2fm (2010 to 2015); The Tubridy Show on RTÉ Radio 1 (2006 to 2010); Tubridy Tonight on RTÉ One (2004 to 2009); The Full Irish on RTÉ 2fm (2002 to 2005); The Ryan Tubridy Show on Virgin Radio UK (2024 to 2025)
- Occupations: Broadcaster, writer, podcaster
- Agent: Noel Kelly
- Relatives: Seán Tubridy (paternal grandfather); Todd Andrews (maternal grandfather); David Andrews (uncle); Niall Andrews (uncle); Barry Andrews (first cousin); Chris Andrews (first cousin); David Andrews Jnr (first cousin)

Ryan Tubridy (born 28 May 1973) is an Irish broadcaster. Until 19 December 2025, he presented a weekday mid-morning programme The Ryan Tubridy Show on Virgin Radio UK (which aired simultaneously on Dublin's Q102) from 10:00AM–1:00PM. On 22 March 2026 he started a new show on Times Radio in the UK from 1–4pm on Sundays.

He currently presents an Ireland–only radio show called The Ryan Tubridy Show on Sundays from 10:00AM–12:00PM on Dublin's Q102, LMFM, Cork's 96FM and Live 95 FM in Limerick and his own podcast series The Bookshelf with Ryan Tubrity.

His broadcasting career with RTÉ spanned over two decades, where he presented many shows on radio and television, most notably The Late Late Show on RTÉ One from 2009 to 2023. Other shows he presented include RTÉ 2fm's The Full Irish (2004–2009) and Tubridy (2010–2015), RTÉ One's Tubridy Tonight (2004–2009), RTÉ Radio One's The Tubridy Show (2005–2010) and The Ryan Tubridy Show (2015–2023). He also hosted the Rose of Tralee contest on two occasions and worked for BBC Radio.

Tubridy has written several books, including JFK in Ireland, The Irish Are Coming and Patrick and the President. He was known as the highest-paid person at RTÉ over several years; related controversies included his initial refusal to take a voluntary pay cut in 2009, and, most importantly for his career, in 2023 over misstatement of his total earnings and additional payments, at least some made via a costly "barter account" mechanism. The latter scandal led to RTÉ dispensing with Tubridy's services in August 2023.

== Background and early life ==
=== Birth and education ===
Born in Booterstown, Dublin, in 1973, Tubridy was educated at Carysfort National School and Blackrock College, where he was schooled alongside Craig Doyle and Ryle Nugent. He studied for a Bachelor of Arts in history and Greek and Roman civilisation at UCD.

At UCD Tubridy was closely involved in student politics, joining the Fianna Fáil Kevin Barry Cumann and the Dún Laoghaire branch of Ógra Fianna Fáil, as well as the campus station Belfield FM. Fellow Cumann members later recalled him as sitting on the party's liberal wing, supportive of the legalisation of homosexuality and divorce, and as a figure who "appeared to be set on a political career". In 1993 he stood for cathaoirleach of the Cumann but finished third, taking 17 of 87 votes cast, behind the winner, Tiernan Brady; he subsequently became auditor of the UCD History Society instead. According to the public relations consultant Paul Hayes, a contemporary at UCD, the two men decided between unpaid internships, one at RTÉ and one at Fianna Fáil's Mount Street headquarters, by tossing a coin; Hayes took the party placement, while Tubridy went to RTÉ. In subsequent media profiles, Tubridy tended to play down his party involvement, instead emphasising his social life as a student.

=== Parents and wider family ===
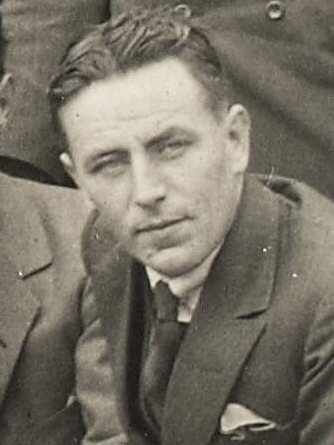
Tubridy's grandfather was the doctor and Fianna Fáil TD Seán Tubridy.

One of five children, Tubridy's siblings are Judith, Niall, Rachel and Garrett; he also has two half-sisters from his father's second marriage. His father, Patrick Tubridy of Blackrock, who died in January 2013, was a psychiatrist at the St John of God campus in Stillorgan, and the only son of the Fianna Fáil TD Seán Tubridy (1897 to 1939). Tubridy's mother is Catherine (née Andrews), whose father, Todd Andrews, was a prominent associate of Fianna Fáil founder Éamon de Valera and held posts in several semi-state companies. In a 2021 interview, Tubridy said his parents' separation, which occurred when he was a child, remained "one of the great, great difficulties of my life", while declining to discuss it further out of consideration for his mother.

Of his siblings, Niall is a professor of clinical medicine and a leading neurologist. Garrett ran unsuccessfully for the Pembroke to Rathmines ward of Dublin City Council at the 2009 local elections, standing against fellow Fianna Fáil candidate Jim O'Callaghan, brother of the broadcaster Miriam O'Callaghan, who had herself been a rival candidate for the Late Late Show presenting role. Because the campaign coincided with the local and European elections, RTÉ instructed Tubridy to observe its impartiality rules and to avoid public appearances alongside his brother.

A maternal uncle, Niall Andrews, was a TD and MEP, while another maternal uncle, David Andrews, served as an Irish government minister, including as Minister for Foreign Affairs. Two first cousins, Barry Andrews and Chris Andrews, have also sat in Dáil Éireann as Fianna Fáil TDs, with Barry later becoming chief executive of the aid charity GOAL and subsequently a Fianna Fáil MEP. Another cousin, David Andrews Jnr, is a comedian working under the pseudonym David McSavage. Following Tubridy's departure from The Late Late Show, McSavage publicly criticised him for never having him as a guest in his 14 years as host. McSavage regularly appeared as a guest under Tubridy's predecessor Pat Kenny.

In October 2015, Tubridy and Barry Andrews jointly discussed their grandfather Todd Andrews, who was taught by Patrick Pearse at St Enda's School and fought on the anti-Treaty side during the Irish Civil War. Tubridy said he had learned more about his paternal grandfather, Seán Tubridy, who also fought on the anti-Treaty side, through the television programme Who Do You Think You Are?, and encouraged students to research their own family histories ahead of the 1916 centenary.

== Broadcasting career ==
Though later noted for his bookishness, it was television films that interested Tubridy as a child; he wrote to RTÉ at the age of 12 to complain that there should be more of those on TV for boys his age. RTÉ responded by inviting him to review films on its Saturday morning programme Anything Goes, beginning a long relationship with the broadcaster.

=== RTÉ ===
==== Radio ====
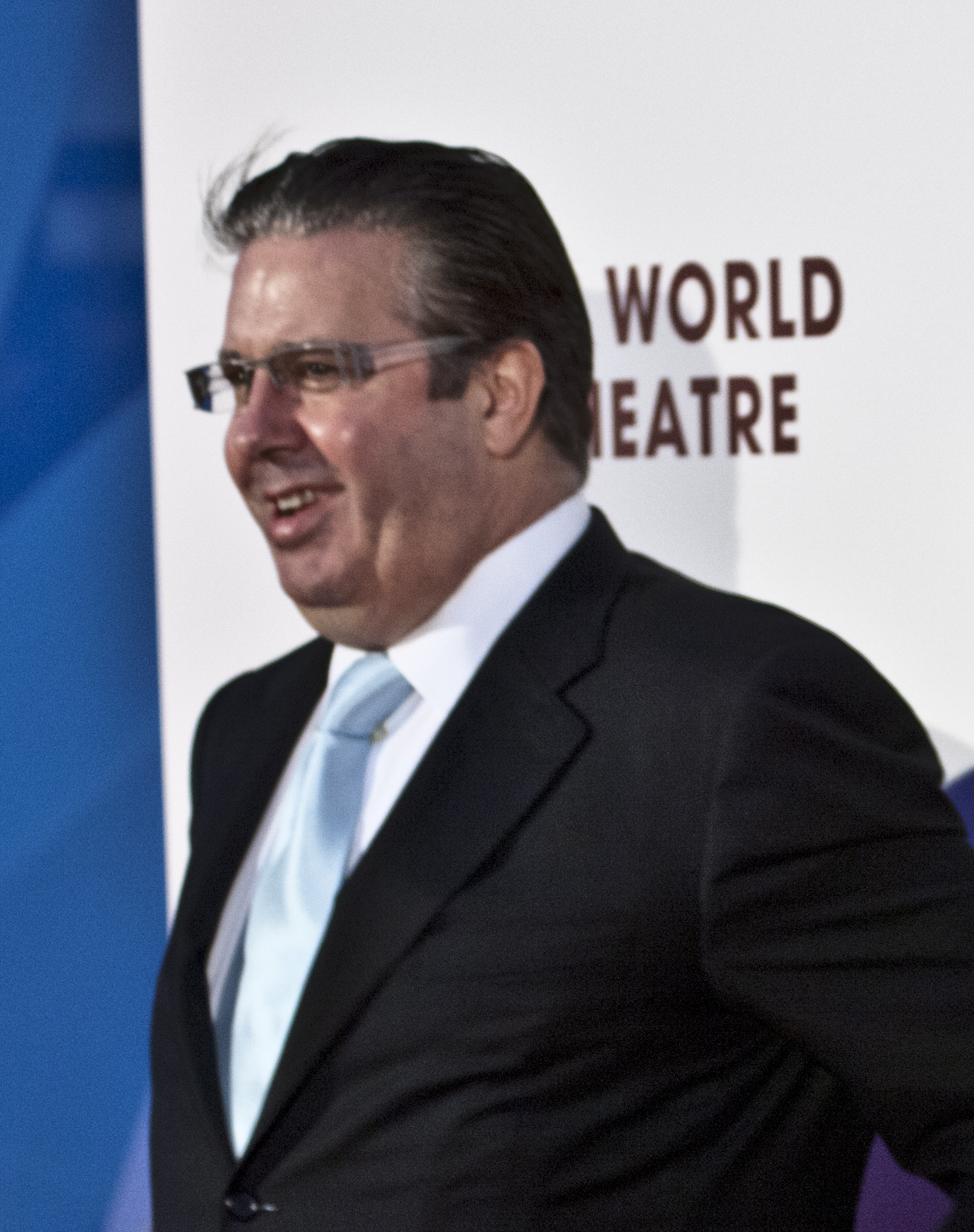
Tubridy's first role in broadcasting came working for Gerry Ryan at RTE.

After leaving college, Tubridy became a runner at RTÉ, initially working on The Gerry Ryan Show as maker of tea and coffee. He later said Gerry Ryan had told him, "I like what you do. I like what you are. I'm going to look after you". He went on to work as a reporter for Today with Pat Kenny and occasionally presented the radio news programme Five Seven Live. In 1999 he presented Morning Glory on RTÉ Radio 1, and in 2000 he moved to The Sunday Show. From 2002 to 2005 he presented RTÉ 2fm's breakfast show, The Full Irish, a move initially viewed within the station as risky but which became its most successful breakfast programme, rising to become the second most popular radio programme in Ireland after Morning Ireland.

In 2006 Tubridy began presenting The Tubridy Show on RTÉ Radio 1. Following the death of Gerry Ryan in 2010, Tubridy succeeded him on RTÉ 2fm, presenting Tubridy from August 2010, with Bono as his first guest; the programme suffered a sustained decline in listenership, losing around 40% of its audience by 2011.

Tubridy returned to RTÉ Radio 1 in September 2015 to present The Ryan Tubridy Show, an hour-long weekday morning programme, which he continued to host until he left RTÉ in August 2023, following the collapse of negotiations with director general Kevin Bakhurst in the wake of the RTÉ secret payment scandal.

==== Television ====
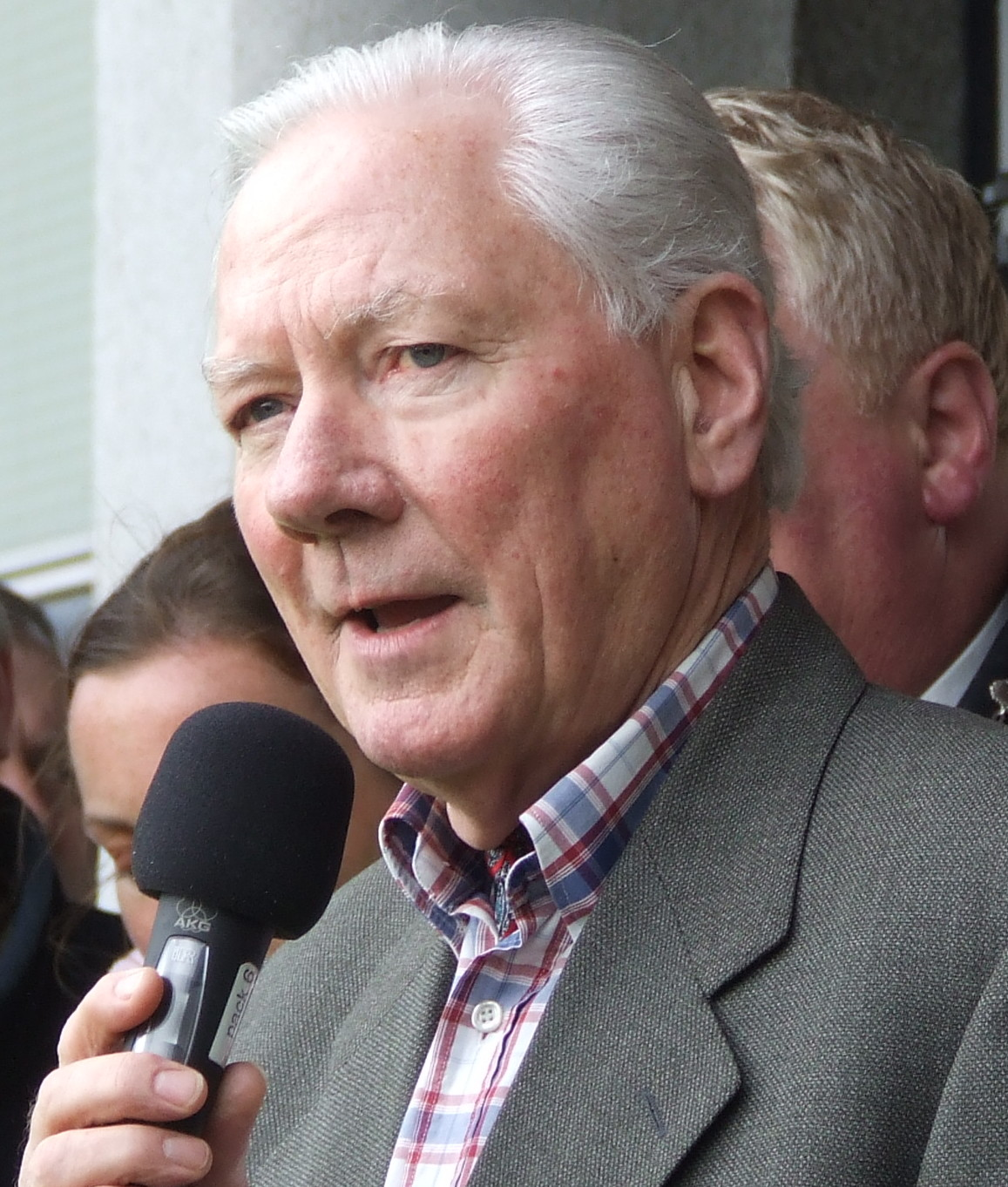
Tubridy's entry into television saw him fill role's previously held by the presenter Gay Byrne.

Tubridy was presumed heir to Gay Byrne as presenter of The Late Late Show as early as 2003, when he took over hosting the Rose of Tralee, another of Byrne's former roles.

His first serious effort at his own TV show was All Kinds of Everything, a music nostalgia programme that took its title from the song of the same name, which, as a schoolgirl, Dana sang at the Eurovision Song Contest 1970. Before this had even been broadcast, however, Tubridy had been offered the Rose of Tralee presenting vacancy, which he accepted. RTÉ was set on Derek Mooney, but festival organisers objected and Tubridy landed the role.

In 2004 he began hosting Tubridy Tonight, his own Saturday-night talk show seen as a successor to Kenny Live. He was confirmed as Pat Kenny's successor on The Late Late Show on 11 May 2009, debuting that September with Taoiseach Brian Cowen as his first guest, an interview that drew an audience share of 62%.

In May 2011 the Broadcasting Authority of Ireland upheld a complaint against Tubridy after he described a paedophile as a "monster" and a "creature" on air, suggesting such offenders could not be cured and "should have bits taken off". That September, Tubridy moderated the first television debate between the seven candidates in that year's presidential election on The Late Late Show, questioning each on their suitability for office, campaign finances and policy positions, including pressing Martin McGuinness on his departure from the IRA and Dana Rosemary Scallon on the seal of confession.

In February 2015, Tubridy's interview with Socialist TD Paul Murphy drew criticism after the host questioned Murphy at length about his role in the 2014 Jobstown protest, during which Tánaiste Joan Burton's car had been surrounded, and about a separate protest in which President Michael D. Higgins had been verbally abused. Murphy said afterwards the interview "was an exercise in badgering" intended to link him to the abuse of the President, which he said he had repeatedly condemned. The following month, more than 200 anti-water-charges protesters demonstrated outside RTÉ's Donnybrook headquarters, accusing the broadcaster of biased coverage of their movement, with some citing Tubridy's interview with Murphy as an example of what they considered an over-the-top approach.

The 2018 season of The Late Late Show addressed several contentious social issues. In April 2018 Tubridy hosted a debate on the forthcoming Eighth Amendment referendum featuring obstetrician Peter Boylan. In October he interviewed former White House press secretary Sean Spicer, challenging him on comments made by President Donald Trump about Mexican immigrants; when Spicer suggested the remarks were comparable to how Irish emigrants had once been viewed, Tubridy replied, "That's not funny". The following month, businessman Peter Casey, runner-up in that year's presidential election, appeared on the programme and was questioned by audience members from the Travelling community over remarks describing Travellers as people "camping in someone else's land"; Casey later said he had found Tubridy "unprofessional" and "patronising", while RTÉ declined to comment. President Higgins was re-elected that October with 56% of the vote, with Casey finishing second on 23%. Other guests that year included Fianna Fáil leader Micheál Martin, who used his interview to criticise then-taoiseach Leo Varadkar, and actors Gabriel Byrne and Liam Neeson, who offered contrasting views on the MeToo movement.

In April 2019 Tubridy interviewed novelist John Boyne about the controversy surrounding his novel My Brother's Name is Jessica and Boyne's objection to being described as having "cis privilege"; the exchange was noted for Tubridy's attentive handling of the discussion and his call for "less shouting, more education". That September, Tubridy attracted criticism for remarks about climate activist Greta Thunberg following her address to the United Nations, describing her face as appearing "contorted in pain, in agony and in anxiety" and voicing concern about the effect of campaigning on her wellbeing in light of her Asperger's. Responding the following day, Tubridy said the remarks had "come from the heart" and clarified he had not intended to characterise Asperger's as a mental illness.

In December 2020 the Broadcasting Authority of Ireland rejected a complaint against Tubridy over comments made during a discussion of young women's use of make-up, during which he said they "look better, and young and Irish" once it was removed; although the complaint was dismissed, the regulator found Tubridy "could have been more careful in his choice of words".

Throughout the COVID-19 pandemic, Tubridy continued presenting The Late Late Show from RTÉ's Donnybrook studios without a live audience, testing positive for COVID-19 in March 2020 and returning to his radio programme the following month. He later said the programme "became this kind of signpost in the fog" for viewers during successive lockdowns, and that he tried to gauge the national mood week to week, moving "like a radio dial" between reflecting public anger, impatience and exhaustion. Pandemic-era editions of the show, including fundraising appeals for charities such as the Society of Saint Vincent de Paul, raised an estimated €20 million.

On 16 March 2023 Tubridy announced he would step down as presenter of The Late Late Show after 14 years, with his last show broadcast on 26 May at the end of that season; Patrick Kielty was announced as his successor. Following the announcement, journalist Gavan Reilly suggested Tubridy's departure might be motivated by ambitions to run for the presidency of Ireland, citing his family's political background and his handling of the show "like a national altar" during the pandemic; Tubridy did not confirm or deny the theory.

==== Earnings and the 2023 payment scandal ====
In 2008, Tubridy was RTÉ's fourth-highest-paid presenter, having received a 50% salary increase the previous year. He initially refused to take a voluntary pay cut in early 2009, even as colleagues including Pat Kenny and Marian Finucane agreed to reductions, attracting public criticism; in March 2009 he announced he would take a 10% cut, citing a change in his legal situation. During his time at RTÉ, Tubridy worked not as an employee but as a contractor, paying himself through his production company, Tuttle Productions Limited, incorporated in August 2008.

His earnings were periodically the subject of public reporting: in December 2018 it was reported he had earned €495,000 in 2016, and in January 2021 that he had earned the same figure in each of the previous three years; by February 2023 he was reported to have been paid €466,250 in 2020 and €440,000 in 2021, making him RTÉ's highest earner.

In June 2023 it emerged that these published figures had understated Tubridy's earnings. RTÉ admitted on 22 June that it had paid him €345,000 more than publicly declared between 2017 and 2022, in what the chair of its board described as a "serious breach of trust with the public"; the sum had been channelled in part through a barter account mechanism, attracting more than €80,000 in additional fees. Tubridy said he was "surprised" to learn of the "errors" and could not "shed any light" on the payments. The revelations led to the suspension and subsequent resignation of director general Dee Forbes. On 11 July 2023 Tubridy and his agent Noel Kelly appeared before two Oireachtas committees, where Tubridy described having endured a "tortuous" and "destructive" three weeks in which he had become "the face of a national scandal". A subsequent review by Grant Thornton found no legal wrongdoing on his part. On 17 August 2023 RTÉ confirmed Tubridy would not return to his presenting roles.

=== BBC Radio ===
In July 2010 Tubridy turned down an offer to present a summer filler for Jonathan Ross's BBC Radio 2 programme, citing preparations for The Late Late Show and the recent death of Gerry Ryan. He presented the slot for eight weeks from July 2011, covering for Ross's replacement Graham Norton, and returned that December as a stand-in for Ken Bruce. He also stood in for Chris Evans and Simon Mayo, and for Terry Wogan's weekend show in 2015.

=== Presenting the Toy Show ===
Tubridy presented The Late Late Toy Show for fourteen editions between 2009 and 2022, describing it as "one of the greatest, weirdest gifts I've ever been given". His last edition in 2022 featured the "fizzy orange fumble", a controversy arising from uncertainty over a word Tubridy used after apparently swearing on the 2020 broadcast.

=== Virgin Radio UK and Times Radio ===
On 16 November 2023 it was announced Tubridy would join Virgin Radio UK in January 2024 to present its mid-morning programme from London, following The Chris Evans Breakfast Show. He presented his first show on 2 January 2024, with The Ryan Tubridy Show airing weekdays from 10am to 1pm and broadcast simultaneously on Dublin's Q102; his first guest was Russell Crowe. He also presented a dedicated Irish weekend programme each Sunday on Q102, Cork's 96FM, LMFM and Limerick's Live 95.

He presented his last Virgin Radio show in December 2025, and on 22 March 2026 began a new Sunday-afternoon programme on Times Radio, broadcast from 1pm to 4pm, continuing an Irish-only Sunday-morning show on Q102, LMFM, 96FM and Live 95. Reflecting on his two years in London, Tubridy said the move had given him "a safe space and a refuge" after the payment scandal, describing the period as providing "a place to breathe".

In 2024, Tubridy launched a podcast, The Bookshelf with Ryan Tubridy, where guests discuss three formative books from their lives. The show was staged live, with editions recorded in Dún Laoghaire's Pavilion Theatre with guest Joseph O'Connor, in Limerick with Blindboy Boatclub, in Cork with John and Francis Brennan, and in Galway with Tommy Tiernan; a further live recording was scheduled for Dublin's 3Olympia Theatre on 8 June 2026.

== Other activities ==
=== Charity work ===
Tubridy is a UNICEF ambassador and has expressed interest in childhood literacy. He has also been associated with the Society of Saint Vincent de Paul Toy Appeal. In February 2015 he launched Galway's Hand in Hand support centre for parents of children with cancer.

=== Writing ===
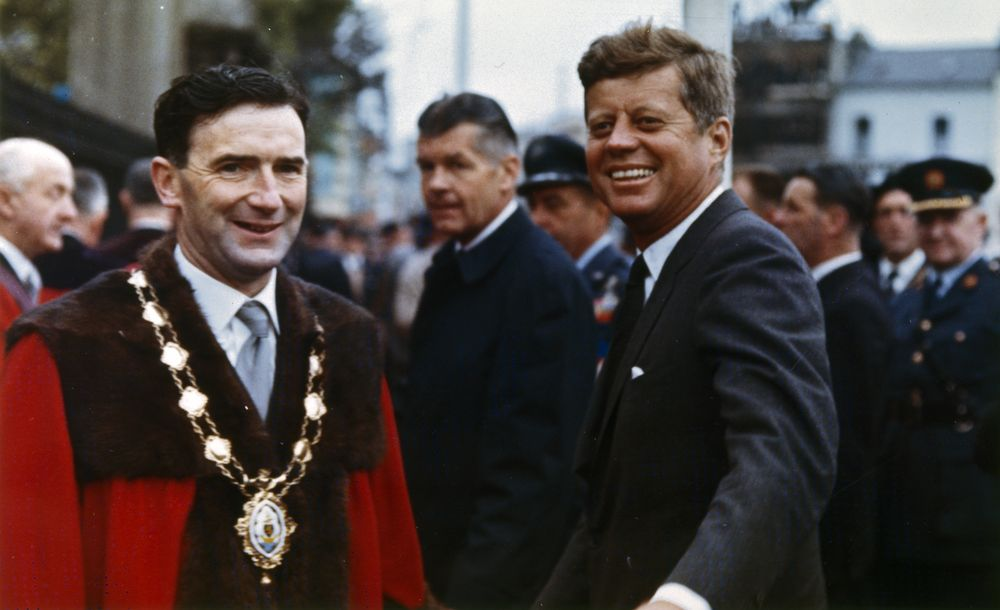
John F. Kennedy, seen here during his June 1963 visit to Galway in Ireland.Tubridy's first book, JFK in Ireland, covered the trip in detail

For more than €100,000, HarperCollins signed Tubridy as part of a two-book deal. His first book, the 302-page JFK in Ireland, was launched at the Mansion House, Dublin, on 27 October 2010, profiling President John F. Kennedy's 1963 visit to Ireland. While researching the book, Tubridy discovered that Éamon de Valera had part of Kennedy's speech to Dáil Éireann erased from the record after finding its content offensive. Reviewing the book for The Irish Times, Deaglán de Bréadún wrote that Tubridy was "a good writer, not a great writer", praising instead the volume's extensive photography while noting the book "vividly" brought the 1963 visit "back to life".

His second book, The Irish Are Coming, about the influence of Irish people in Britain, was published in 2013, followed by a children's book, Patrick and the President. In 2026 Tubridy said he was considering writing a crime novel with an unnamed fellow writer, based on a fictional chat-show host accused of a murder committed in a television green room, citing the "certainty" the genre offered.

=== Social media and other internet issues ===
Tubridy left Twitter, where he had amassed more than 60,000 followers, in August 2011. After a five-year break from social media, he later returned and created an Instagram account, which he has said he manages by focusing on positive engagement.

== Personal life ==
Tubridy met his first wife, producer Anne Marie Power, at RTÉ in 1997. The couple had a daughter, Ella, and married in 2003, having become engaged at the Abbeyglen Hotel in Clifden, County Galway. They separated in 2006, and have two children, Ella and Julia.

After separating from his wife, Tubridy was in a relationship with Aoibhinn Ní Shúilleabháin, a radio and television presenter, from around 2009 until their separation was confirmed in December 2014. He expressed frustration when photographs of the couple on a walk at Powerscourt Waterfall were published, accusing the photographers of a lack of "respect, or human decency".

Tubridy and Dr Clare Kambamettu, a clinical psychologist and former Rose of Tralee winner, made their relationship public in 2023. He announced their engagement in June 2025, and the couple married in December 2025, at the same Abbeyglen Hotel in County Galway where he had proposed to his first wife more than two decades earlier. He has credited his wife with bringing him "great strength and hope and love".

In a 2021 interview, Tubridy said he had attempted therapy a handful of times and found he "couldn't get out of the chatshow guest mode", adding that he preferred to "work out my stuff myself". He described his father's death in 2013 as having caused him "a bit of an existential crisis". By 2026, following the RTÉ payment scandal, Tubridy said he had returned to therapy and this time found it beneficial, telling Hot Press: "I think I'm ready to just iron out a few creases in my mind... I met a therapist and I connected. And it's been great".

On 1 November, Tubridy announced that he and his wife were expecting a child in 2027.

== Public image ==
In his early career Tubridy often described himself as a "young fogey". While hosting Tubridy Tonight, he reflected on public perceptions of him, saying, "I think I am a victim of my own image. I think it's been cultivated by others for me... People only ever see me on a Saturday night on TV and I'm in a smart suit with a book-lined backdrop".

Tubridy's environmental record has drawn comment. The magazine Village contrasted what it described as his limited coverage of environmental topics while at RTÉ with his history of car ownership, from an early sponsorship arrangement with Lexus to a Jaguar XJ and a Volvo, and with his 2019 remarks about Greta Thunberg. When electric cars were discussed on his radio programme in 2022, Tubridy noted he continued to drive "an old car", a 2007 model.

In 2026 Tubridy reflected on a public perception that he could come across as "smug" or "self-regarding", which he attributed partly to the persona he adopted while presenting The Late Late Show, likening it to "putting on your dad's suit... It's Gay's suit or Pat's suit". He said that after leaving RTÉ he had gone almost two years without wearing a suit.

== Political views ==
Tubridy has described himself as "fascinated" by politics and by Fianna Fáil in particular, a party with which his family has been associated for three generations. As a UCD student in the early 1990s, he joined Ógra Fianna Fáil. Contemporaries recalled him as being on the "liberal wing" of Fianna Fáil, supportive of reforms including the legalisation of homosexuality and divorce, and more "apple green" than "dark green" on the issue of Irish Unity, meaning he favoured a diplomatic rather than aggressive approach.

In a 2026 interview, Tubridy criticised the Irish constitution of 1937 as less progressive than the 1916 Proclamation, describing its adoption as "an opportunity missed" that he believed had "held us back by a couple of decades". In the same interview, he expressed sympathy for hauliers involved in fuel protests, saying he had been "moved by the plight" of demonstrators despite not personally being inconvenienced by their actions.

Tubridy has written a regular opinion column commenting on international affairs. Writing after the inauguration of United States President Donald Trump in January 2017, Tubridy referenced Sinclair Lewis's novel It Can't Happen Here, prompted by controversy over disputed attendance figures at the ceremony, though he said it would be "hysterical" to suggest Trump was a dictator. Following Trump's second inauguration in January 2025, Tubridy wrote that the new president "clearly means business", comparing the pageantry of the event to ancient Rome and describing Trump as a "deal maker" while likening him variously to the Roman emperors Nero and Caligula. In October 2025 he wrote about the Irish presidential election then under way, between Fine Gael's Heather Humphreys and independent candidate Catherine Connolly, describing the campaign as "uninspiring" and arguing the choice between "left or right" candidates had been narrowed by the absence of a wider field.

Tubridy has voiced strong opposition to Russia's invasion of Ukraine. In April 2022, discussing the war on his radio programme, he described his "unabashed" repugnance for Russian President Vladimir Putin and his admiration for Ukrainian President Volodymyr Zelenskiy, whom he called "this man who has answered history's call".

In a September 2025 column, Tubridy wrote of a perceived decline in civil discourse in Ireland, citing his own experiences of being confronted and verbally abused in public during the COVID-19 pandemic. He condemned threats made against the family of Tánaiste Simon Harris, and, discussing the assassination of American conservative activist Charlie Kirk, wrote that "regardless of your politics", Kirk had been willing to debate students in person rather than issue anonymous threats online. He called on political leaders on "the angry left and furious right" to "exert a modicum of calm, kindness and cop on".

=== Potential political career ===
Following Tubridy's departure from RTÉ, speculation about a possible political career intensified. In April 2026, asked on Georgie Crawford's podcast The Good Glow whether he would consider running for President of Ireland, Tubridy said he came "from a very political family" with "politics coursing through my veins", citing his grandfather's service as a Galway TD and his uncle David Andrews' role in signing the Good Friday Agreement. He said he had been surprised by his own sympathy for workers involved in protests and concluded, "What I have learned about life is to never say never to anything... I don't think I could possibly rule out some political road in the future".

In October 2026 Tubridy spoke at Fianna Fáil's centenary celebrations in the Galway Bay Hotel, Salthill, taking part in a panel discussion on the party's history in the Galway West consitutency alongside former ministers Éamon Ó Cuív and Frank Fahey. Asked whether he would consider a political career, Tubridy replied, "How can I not?", adding that politics was "coursing through my veins" from both the Tubridy and Andrews sides of his family. He joked about the prospect of a future headline reading "Deputy Tubridy" winning his grandfather's former Galway West seat "on the second count", saying, "Every night of my life I go to bed dreaming 'some day'". Taoiseach Micheál Martin, also in attendance, paid tribute to Seán Tubridy as "a gaelgeoir of note" and a respected community doctor.

== Awards and recognition ==
Tubridy won the Best Irish DJ category at the 2004 Meteor Awards and was named Best Male TV Presenter at the TV Now Awards in 2009. The Dubliner magazine named him Dubliner of the Year in 2009. On 15 March 2023 he received the Guaranteed Irish Person of the Year Award, and in May 2023 he was awarded the President's Medal by the Library Association of Ireland for his work promoting reading and libraries.

Media offices
Preceded by Marty Whelan	Host of The Rose of Tralee; 2003–2004	Succeeded by Ray D'Arcy
Preceded by Pat Kenny	Host of The Late Late Show; 2009–2023	Succeeded by Patrick Kielty
