= Death of Gerry Ryan =

Irish death

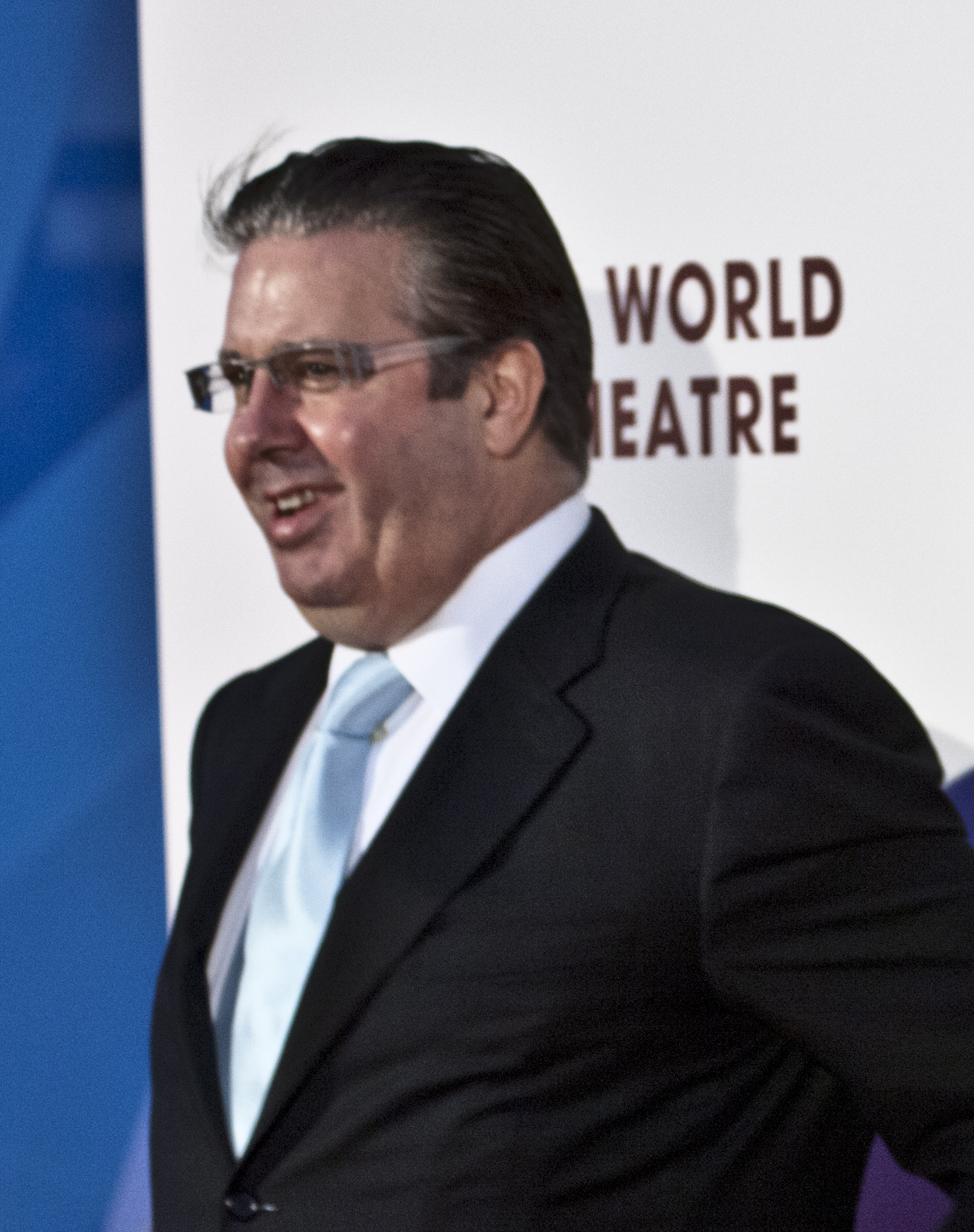
Gerry Ryan at the opening of the Grand Canal Theatre in March 2010

Irish broadcaster Gerry Ryan died on 30 April 2010, aged 53. He had been presenting The Gerry Ryan Show since 1988 and at the time of his death had the largest audience on RTÉ 2fm. Ryan also hosted several television series, including Secrets, Gerry Ryan Tonight, Ryantown, Gerry Ryan's Hitlist and Operation Transformation and Ryan Confidential, as well as one edition of The Late Late Show in 2008. He co-presented the Eurovision Song Contest 1994 with Cynthia Ní Mhurchú. He died at his Upper Leeson Street apartment in Dublin, with his body found by his partner Melanie Verwoerd. The broadcaster had split from his wife Morah in 2008; the couple had five children together.

Ryan's death provoked tributes from politicians, colleagues and ordinary people alike, culminating in a mass outpouring of public and private sympathy as thousands of people queued over several days to sign books of condolence at RTÉ's radio centre and at the Mansion House. The media and psychotherapists compared this to public reaction following the death of Michael Jackson. His death was spoken in terms such as "practically br[inging] Ireland to a standstill", having "a seismic effect on Irish society" and having "shocked the Irish nation". The Irish Times reported that its website had the biggest traffic spike since its launch, following Ryan's death. Google said it was the most searched story of the year in the country.

It subsequently emerged, following an inquest in December 2010, that the broadcaster was a heavy alcohol drinker and cocaine user, and that cocaine was a contributory factor in his death. This led to comparisons, including from broadcaster Marian Finucane and drugs minister Pat Carey, with the 2007 death of model Katy French. According to journalist Kevin Myers, Ryan's usage of cocaine surprised many of those who mourned his sudden death and, he said, this realisation of double standards has upset much of the public. RTÉ admitted that it had censored coverage of Ryan's cocaine habit.

A media debate on the ethics of both journalism and Twitter, through which many people discovered Ryan had died, ensued after his death. The manner in which some RTÉ personalities reported the death led to RTÉ bringing in new rules on how its stars should use Twitter. Ryan's funeral on 6 May 2010 was broadcast live online and to his listeners on RTÉ 2fm, marking the first time in its history that the predominantly musical station aired a Mass. The ceremony included performances from both U2 and Westlife. Ryan was buried privately at Dardistown Cemetery in Cloghran. Several posthumous lifetime achievement awards have since been collected by the Ryan family on behalf of Gerry.

== Death ==
On the night prior to his death Ryan telephoned his radio producer, Alice O'Sullivan, to tell her he would not be able to broadcast The Gerry Ryan Show the following morning. He said he was "feeling drained" but insisted that he did not require a doctor.

On the morning of his death Ryan did not present his radio show. Fiona Looney presented instead, making the ironic comment to Colm Hayes when asked if she was ready: "Not really because I got a call at ten to seven this morning, and I always presume somebody's died... and then I presumed Gerry had died because the phone call was from his producer. But he isn't totally dead, he's hanging on". Meanwhile, musician Jerry Fish travelled to Dublin from his County Carlow home to rehearse the song "All the Time in the World" which he and Ryan were scheduled to perform at the National Concert Hall on 5 May as part of a Mooney special. He noticed Ryan's absence and Looney's presence on the radio show and was concerned at his inability to contact the former.

Ryan's girlfriend, Melanie Verwoerd, also noticed his absence from the radio and found herself unable to get through to him via telephone. She went to his flat in Leeson Street Upper, Dublin 4, arriving at 12:30 to break and enter with the assistance of a builder located nearby. They found Ryan dead on the bedroom floor of his Leeson Street flat. There was no visible indication that a crime had been committed or that Ryan had deliberately killed himself. Emergency services were called and the flat was sealed off as the media gathered outside. A doctor entered the flat at approximately 15:00 and spent 20 minutes inside before leaving, with Ryan's body being taken away at a later stage.

RTÉ delayed announcing the death until Ryan's family were told. The death was already being discussed on Twitter and had been announced on Newstalk. Rumours about Ryan's death spread online, though the news remained unconfirmed for a time. Rick O'Shea posted several Twitter messages, including "Am attempting to verify the Gerry Ryan story doing the rounds... Calm heads lads...", followed by "Can anyone tell me where the Gerry Ryan story is coming from?" then, finally, "Jesus". Miriam O'Callaghan tweeted the previous hour — "Tragically it is true. So terribly shocking and sad. Life is just too cruel sometimes. RIP." — before deleting it but not before TV3 picked up on it for their News@5:30 bulletin. They also noted a message from Today FM's Ian Dempsey, formerly a colleague of Ryan at RTÉ 2fm, which stated: "Gerry Ryan RIP – shocking news just breaking – a big loss to radio and Ireland". An online war was also breaking out during the afternoon between rival journalists, including Matt Cooper, Frank Fitzgibbon and Adrian Weckler. Rival radio station Dublin's 98 placed a video on YouTube of Ryan's corpse being taken from his apartment and driven away in an ambulance.

The Ryan family issued the following statement through RTÉ: "Gerry Ryan died today. Morah and his children are in complete shock. Please respect their privacy at this time". RTÉ informed Fish that Ryan had died, with the musician promising to perform the song anyway as a tribute.

== Response ==
=== Politicians ===
Ryan's death attracted tributes from politicians, including the President and several taoisigh. Mary McAleese said Ryan "was an extraordinarily talented broadcaster whose unique communication skills and larger than life persona entertained and enlivened a national audience over many years. His untimely death will be widely mourned, by his colleagues at RTÉ and his many fans, but most especially by his family and friends who are in my thoughts and prayers". Taoiseach Brian Cowen issued a statement saying he was "deeply saddened" at the death of an "informed and intelligent, forthright and articulate" broadcaster, that "Gerry was a household name and a broadcaster of immense talent and popularity", and describing Ryan as "one of the greats of modern Irish broadcasting on radio and television".

Minister for Culture Mary Hanafin said Ryan had "stretched and extended boundaries of radio broadcasting in Ireland" with his "legendary" existence and "comfortable personal style with interviewees". She later queued with members of the public to sign her name in a book of condolence at RTÉ's radio centre. Green Party leader and Minister for the Environment John Gormley paid tribute. "Gerry's ability as a broadcaster to take both the serious and light hearted stories was second to none. His good humour concealed a keen intellect and a commitment to straight journalism – he was a fair and accurate commentator". Minister for Communications Eamon Ryan was "very saddened".

Fine Gael leader Enda Kenny spoke of his "deep shock and regret" and "recognise[d] the enormous contribution Gerry Ryan has made to broadcasting in Ireland and to the development of Irish society as a whole over the last 25 years". Former taoiseach Bertie Ahern expressed his regret at the loss of "a giant of Irish broadcasting". There were other tributes from the Labour Party communications spokesman Liz McManus, Sinn Féin president Gerry Adams, Seán Haughey and Lord Mayor of Dublin Emer Costello.

=== Media ===
Newsflash on RTÉ 2fm (30 April 2010)
Gerry Ryan's sudden death was officially announced during Larry Gogan's show on RTÉ 2fm.

International media across several continents reported on Ryan's death, including BBC News, The Boston Globe, The Daily Telegraph, The Guardian, Herald Sun, The New Zealand Herald, Sky News, Thaindian News, The Times of Malta, The Vancouver Sun and The Washington Post among others.

Many of Ryan's RTÉ colleagues "struggled to hold back their tears on air" as they learned of his sudden death.

Gay Byrne, describing Ryan's death as a "terribly frightening thing", said he would remember the broadcaster as being "full of fun and hilarity and pure bloody devilment". Larry Gogan described Ryan as "the rock of 2fm" on Drivetime. Dave Fanning said that Ryan "revolutionised broadcasting in Ireland would be a very small way of putting it". Liveline presenter Joe Duffy was reported by The Irish Times to have "choked back tears live on air" on the afternoon of Ryan's death.

UK broadcaster Chris Evans said Ryan was "absolutely one of the best broadcasters in the world. Fabulous, fabulous communicator. Very sad to hear he has left us. He really was the cream of our radio crop". The presenter had written about Ryan in his autobiography after being converted to him whilst in Killarney and was inspired to return to radio. Evans expressed his gratitude on Eamon Dunphy's Newstalk radio show.

The Independent Broadcasters of Ireland said "A great voice has been lost to Irish radio and the entire industry is deeply saddened to lose one of Ireland's most professional broadcasters".

On RTÉ Radio 1, The Marian Finucane Show's presenter opened her Saturday radio show by reminiscing on how Ryan used to discuss the morning newspapers. Today with Pat Kenny opened the following Monday with the presenter describing "an ache at the heart of everything we do" and expressing his "happ[iness] for my part to canonise him in the hierarchy of broadcasting greats".

Quentin Fottrell, radio reviewer with The Irish Times, said "The tributes on all radio stations to Gerry Ryan were a testament to his 20-plus years presenting the morning show on RTÉ 2FM and the powerful presence this most unassuming of mediums has in the lives of ordinary people. Whether or not you knew him personally or were a regular listener, it was difficult not be moved by the thousands of messages".

RTÉ delayed the launch of their new season schedule by 24 hours as it clashed with the date of Ryan's funeral. Among the changes was the axing of long-running holiday programme No Frontiers, which presenter Kathryn Thomas knew about for several days but did not speak of in public.

Hot Press featured Ryan on the cover of the issue published after his death.

==== The Late Late Show ====
"There was such sorrow that I had to go home after I found out. I knew I couldn't do The Late Late Show straight away and that I had to go home to cry myself out in case I did something silly like breaking down on live telly".

— Ryan Tubridy temporarily walked out of RTÉ amid his grief for his friend and colleague.

The Late Late Show was due to be broadcast on RTÉ One on the night of Ryan's death, a Friday. A tribute sequence was arranged between the news breaking of Ryan's death and the programme's broadcast. Presenter Ryan Tubridy expressed his grief on air by saying the "country has lost a great broadcaster and I have lost a great friend" and compared the RTÉ radio centre to "Hamlet without the prince". Tributes on the show came from, among others, Gay Byrne, Pat Kenny, Joe Duffy, Dave Fanning, Brenda Donohue and David Blake Knox. Kenny expressed his belief that Ryan "with Mr Wogan and Mr Byrne, you are the holy trinity as far as I'm concerned". Duffy wondered about a comment Ryan had made during an interview with Heather Mills which had been broadcast the night before, in which he had said he had "two artic truckloads full of regrets".

The tribute led to The Late Late Show's highest audience ratings of 2010.

Grease actress Stockard Channing, a guest on that night's edition of The Late Late Show, spoke of feeling like she had interrupted "a stranger's funeral" as audience members were still in tears when she arrived. Channing alleged that no death in her native United States would receive such an emotional reaction.

==== Tribute shows ====
Two tribute shows were broadcast by RTÉ 2fm on the Saturday and the Tuesday following Ryan's death. Evelyn O'Rourke, who worked on The Gerry Ryan Show for eight years, presented what was her first broadcast since the birth of her baby. It was titled A Special Programme: Remembering Gerry Ryan. On the first show Bono and The Edge said Ryan was the "nation's weather vane" and a "great analyst of the country's affairs". There were contributions from Philip Boucher-Hayes and Brenda Donohue and 16 July 1992 interview with rape victim Lavinia Kerwick, considered an important moment in the show's history. The public requested another programme so RTÉ duly obliged and O'Rourke presented again on 4 May in Ryan's old morning slot. The second show featured contributions from, among others, Marty Whelan, who said Ryan still had some vinyl albums belonging to him.

A television documentary on the life of Ryan was also announced.

=== Other public figures ===
U2 manager Paul McGuinness appeared on The Marian Finucane Show on 1 May to say "The whole country is in mourning now. The country was in love with him".

Writer John Banville said he was "very much like an 18th century wit. He was very funny, but he was also very witty and there's a difference. His humour, which really appealed to me was very much language-based, he was alive to the comic possibilities of language, and the ambiguity of language".

Comedian Dara Ó Briain said: "Very sad news about Gerry Ryan. How long did he do that show? Twenty, 25 years? That is some achievement. Condolences to his family".

Chef Richard Corrigan said: "He was a natural and incredibly entertaining bon viveur. My wife Maria and I listen to him every day and we are both terribly saddened with this news".

Hollywood actor Colin Farrell described Ryan's death as a "great loss to the Irish people".

British publicist Max Clifford said Ryan would have been as famous as Terry Wogan or Graham Norton if he had worked in the UK.

Girls Aloud member Cheryl Cole missed a party to comfort Louis Walsh in the Four Seasons Hotel Dublin.

Heather Mills emailed the following message to David Blake Knox on 1 May: "I only had the honour of meeting Gerry once, but I felt as if I had known him longer. He put you at ease immediately and opened up about himself – very rare in an interviewer. My heart goes out to his family, whom he obviously adored, and did not stop talking about. I'm sure he will be sorely missed, remembered, cherished and honoured".

=== Public ===
1,300 people honoured Ryan with a minute of silence after his death was announced during a talent contest in Ibiza, with a TG4 TV crew who were filming the event also capturing this moment.

Nearly 20,000 people visited a Facebook tribute page in the first hours of the news. By the end of the weekend at least 40,000 people had signed the Facebook page and thousands of e-mails and texts were delivered to RTÉ 2fm.

RTÉ announced its radio centre at its headquarters at Montrose in Donnybrook would open on 1 May from 12:00 until 18:00, to give people an opportunity to sign a book of condolence in Ryan's memory. Hundreds of people of all ages and from all backgrounds queued in extreme weather conditions to sign the book, located on a table beside a black-and-white photograph of the broadcaster inside a black frame and a card from RTÉ broadcaster Joe Duffy with the message: "You are the best and the brightest". The Irish Times suggested 2,000 people signed their name that day. The public queued again at the radio centre for the same time period the following day, with The Irish Times saying 1,000 had signed their names on this day. The newspaper later said more than 4,000 people had signed books of condolence at the RTÉ radio centre. More than 7,000 texts and Twitter messages sent in by the public were later left beside the books by RTÉ.

More books of condolence was then opened by Lord Mayor of Dublin Emer Costello at the Mansion House from noon on 3 May for a three-day period, with people queuing as early as one hour before the building opened. Signatories included comedian Brendan O'Carroll, Fianna Fáil politician Seán Haughey, social activist Stanislaus Kennedy (Sister Stan), Ryan's agent Noel Kelly and broadcaster Ryan Tubridy, who queued "as a listener and a friend". O'Carroll compared the death to his discovery as a child that Nelson's Pillar had been blown up. There were addresses from across the island, including Northern Ireland. Many left in tears.

By the day of the funeral, the number of people to have signed books of condolence for Ryan had reached 10,000, according to The Irish Times.

Ryan's family requested that any member of the public wishing to send flowers might make a charitable donation in his memory instead.

== Post-mortem and wake ==
The media gathered outside the Ryan family home even before the body had been released to the family. The gathering was good-natured in tone; journalists were even fed by Ryan's family.

An autopsy on Ryan's body took place on 4 May at Dublin City Morgue in Marino. It was delayed by one day as Ryan's death clashed with a bank holiday weekend and there was no desire to take advantage of his high-profile status, according to a family spokesperson. She also said the family believed Ryan had undergone "a massive heart attack".

Later that day the funeral arrangements were announced, with RTÉ confirming the funeral would be broadcast on RTÉ 2fm. This marked the first occasion on which Mass was broadcast on the predominantly music station in its history, with Head of 2fm John McMahon calling it "an unprecedented situation". RTÉ.ie and a webcam on the parish's website also broadcast the funeral.

Ryan's body received a traditional Irish wake, reposing at the family home on Castle Avenue in Clontarf on the night of 4 May. Bouquets were donated by the public and some neighbours came along. The Irish Independent's front page on 5 May featured Ryan's return to his family home inside his coffin, while the funeral also made the front page of the newspaper. A private wake was held at Castle Avenue on the afternoon of 5 May. Notable attendees included former Taoiseach Bertie Ahern, Pat Kenny, who landed on his motorcycle, and Dave Fanning, who brought along some of Ryan's favourite music.

== Funeral ==
Those attending the funeral queued from 10:00 on 6 May, whilst hundreds of ordinary people gathered several hours ahead of the hearse's arrival to weep, talk and clutch sympathetic banners and photographs of the broadcaster. The staff of RTÉ were ferried in buses to the scene. Politicians present included President McAleese, former Taoiseach Albert Reynolds, Lord Mayor of Dublin Emer Costello, Minister for Health Mary Harney and Brian Geoghegan, Minister for Communications Eamon Ryan, Conor Haughey and Seán Haughey, Richard Bruton, and Senator David Norris. Other dignitaries present included the Acting Chief of Staff of the Defence Forces, Major-General David Ashe, and the chief executive of the Football Association of Ireland, John Delaney. Famous personalities present included broadcasters Mark Cagney, Joe Duffy, Marian Finucane, Larry Gogan, John Kelly, Pat Kenny, Fiona Looney, Aonghus MacAnally, Hector Ó hEochagáin, Mícheál Ó Muircheartaigh, Gráinne and Síle Seoige, Ryan Tubridy, Marty Whelan, and Director-General of RTÉ Cathal Goan and former RTÉ director-general Bob Collins, as well as designer John Rocha, promoter John Reynolds, Hot Press editor Niall Stokes, celebrity solicitor Gerald Kean, developer Harry Crosbie, comedian Brendan Grace, chef Derry Clarke, singer Linda Martin, TV presenter Craig Doyle, The Afternoon Show's Maura Derrane and Sheana Keane, music manager and TV talent judge Louis Walsh, Boyzone member Keith Duffy, musician Sharon Corr, entertainer Twink model Glenda Gilson, and Riverdance founders Moya Doherty and John McColgan. Rival Today FM broadcasters Ray D'Arcy (whose radio show aired during the same hours as Ryan's), Ian Dempsey and Tony Fenton were also present. One notable absentee was veteran broadcaster Gay Byrne who was abroad on "a long-standing arrangement to leave Ireland on Monday morning which I couldn't break". A man who resembled Elvis Presley stood outside the church, posing for photographs and holding a photograph of Ryan.

The funeral commenced at 11:30 at the small St John the Baptist on Clontarf Road, located approximately 750 metres from Castle Avenue and where his marriage and the funeral of his mother had both taken place. Hundreds of people were present. Chief mourners were Ryan's wife Morah Ryan, from whom he was estranged, and her children Lottie, Rex, Bonnie, Elliot and Babette, whilst Verwoerd was also seated prominently. Babette clutched a teddy bear. Father Michael Collins, who often appeared as a religious correspondent – "the Gerry Ryan padre and friend of this parish" – on The Gerry Ryan Show, was the chief celebrant. Speakers were erected to allow outsiders to hear proceedings and traffic diversions had to be initiated.

The coffin was carried into the church by Ryan's sons Rex and Elliott, Ryan's brothers Michael and Vincent, David Blake-Knox and Michael O'Connor, as hundreds of onlookers looked on. Father Brian D'Arcy gave the Homily. Much of the music was provided by the RTÉ National Symphony Orchestra's String Quartet and the Dublin Gospel Choir. Westlife, who flew in from the UK dressed in black and white, and the Dublin Gospel Choir duetted on a tearful a cappella rendition of "You Raise Me Up" after Holy Communion. U2 performed "With or Without You", adding the additional lines "Calling from New York on the Ryan Line, Ryan Line still open" / "Goodbye Gerry, see you down the road". Towards the end Rex, Lottie, Vincent and Morah spoke about Ryan. Lottie quoted Blade Runner and Morah gave thanks to the listeners who were "the reason he got up each morning". Businessman Robbie Wootton, a "close friend" of the family, recorded the Mass with a camcorder at their request but the footage was not made available for public consumption.

Ryan was buried privately at Dardistown Cemetery in Cloghran. "Open the pod bay doors Hal" taken from 2001: A Space Odyssey is etched into the coffin.

== Aftermath ==
After the funeral, Morah Ryan received a letter expressing sympathy for her loss from former President of the United States Bill Clinton; the Clintons and Ryans are on first-name terms with each other. She did not appear in public until 7 September 2010. A posthumous lifetime achievement award was collected by the Ryan family some weeks after the funeral during the TV Now Awards.

In June RTÉ 2fm was reported to be "haemorrhaging" 10,000 listeners every week since the death of Gerry Ryan as RTÉ struggled to confirm a successor. Melanie Verwoerd later spoke of the difficulties she had listening to Gerry Ryan's eventual RTÉ 2fm successor Ryan Tubridy. Tubridy took over the role on 20 August 2010, paying tribute to Gerry and having Bono as a guest on his opening show.

Lottie and Rex Ryan received a posthumous accolade on behalf of their father, presented to them by Dave Fanning at the People of the Year Awards on 11 September 2010. Gerry Ryan was given the award for his "unrivalled broadcasting skills which ranged effortlessly from the utterly sensitive and intimate to the fantastically flamboyant and theatrical".

Ryan Tubridy requested a round of applause for Gerry at the launch of his book JFK in Ireland at the Mansion House, Dublin on 27 October 2010.

In 2011, the board of UNICEF Ireland terminated Verwoerd's employment due to the publicity surrounding her relationship with Ryan and the fallout from his death.

=== Inquest, cocaine controversy and RTÉ censorship ===
An inquest was held at Dublin City Coroner's Court on 10 December 2010. It heard that traces of cocaine were the "likely trigger" of Ryan's death. Coroner Dr Brian Farrell said the cause of death was cardiac arrhythmia, with the use of cocaine as a significant risk factor. He recorded a verdict of death by misadventure with a number of risk factors leading to Mr Ryan's death.

Ryan's friends and RTÉ received criticism for their lack of comment since the emergence into the public arena of his cocaine usage at the inquest, despite having eulogised him after his death. Entrepreneur Ben Dunne said those who spoke positively of Ryan when he died were "weak people if they don't now" [speak out after the inquest]. Liveline presenter Joe Duffy, a former neighbour of Ryan, said he "knew nothing" about the broadcaster's cocaine habit and described himself as being "naive" and "taken aback by the revelation at the inquest". Today FM broadcaster Ian Dempsey also denied having any knowledge of Ryan's cocaine use, saying: "I didn't know about it and I worked beside Gerry every day. I'm either stupid or I was protected from the whole thing". Marian Finucane briefly commented on the revelations during The Marian Finucane Show:

It's all very tragic. I just hope none of his children go to a petrol station, or to a shop today, so they can avoid having to see the coverage in the newspapers, I remember when Katy French died thinking the same thing about her family. I also remember Gerry going on and on about the folly and the wrongness of drugs; and of cocaine in particular at that time.

On his RTÉ lyric fm show Gay Byrne referred to "a little do" which had been organised for Morah Ryan but did not directly mention cocaine. Ryan Tubridy broke his silence on his radio show (in Gerry Ryan's former slot) on 13 December 2010, saying:

You all know that Gerry was my friend and that I loved him. I have said it before and I will say it again today. To be truthful this hasn't changed and while I cannot, and will not, condone cocaine and cocaine use but equally I cannot and will not abandon my friend, who, like the rest of us, had flaws. [...] Without going on about it, there is an expression used when someone dies and that expression is "rest in peace", and these are the words that have been echoing in my mind this weekend. And with that I would urge all of you listening this morning to let Gerry quite simply rest in peace.

Music journalist Joe Jackson alleged on RTÉ News at One that Ryan's cocaine habit was an "open secret" in RTÉ. 4fm broadcaster Gareth O'Callaghan, who worked with Ryan for many years and filled in for him on his radio show in the past, spoke of being offered cocaine by the broadcaster at the 2003 Gerry Ryan Show Christmas party in Four Seasons Hotel Dublin. O'Callaghan was criticised and intimidated after commenting on the matter in public, while Michael O'Doherty, writing in the Evening Herald, posed the question: "Gareth, why the 16-year silence on Gerry?"

On 19 December 2010, the Sunday Independent issued an "Apology to Dr Tony Crosby" (Ryan's doctor) after suggesting in a previous article that he had been complicit in Ryan's death, an allegation the newspaper recognised as being "wholly unfounded".

Drugs minister Pat Carey said he was "a bit taken aback, first of all, by the whole attitude of RTÉ over the last while" [concerning the circumstances of Ryan's death] and, comparing Ryan's cocaine use to the 2007 death of model Katy French, said the media were "very judgmental" when French died but had now "come home to roost in their own case". RTÉ said Carey's comments were "disappointing", though it admitted to having censored coverage of Ryan's cocaine habit. Alan Shatter of Fine Gael advised authorities to "wage all out war" on Ryan's cocaine supplier, while Pat Rabbitte of the Labour Party said allegations of corruption were "very serious from a reputable journalist".

== Posthumous awards ==
- TV Now Awards
- People of the Year Awards
