= Gerry Ryan =

Irish broadcaster (1956–2010)

Gerard Ryan
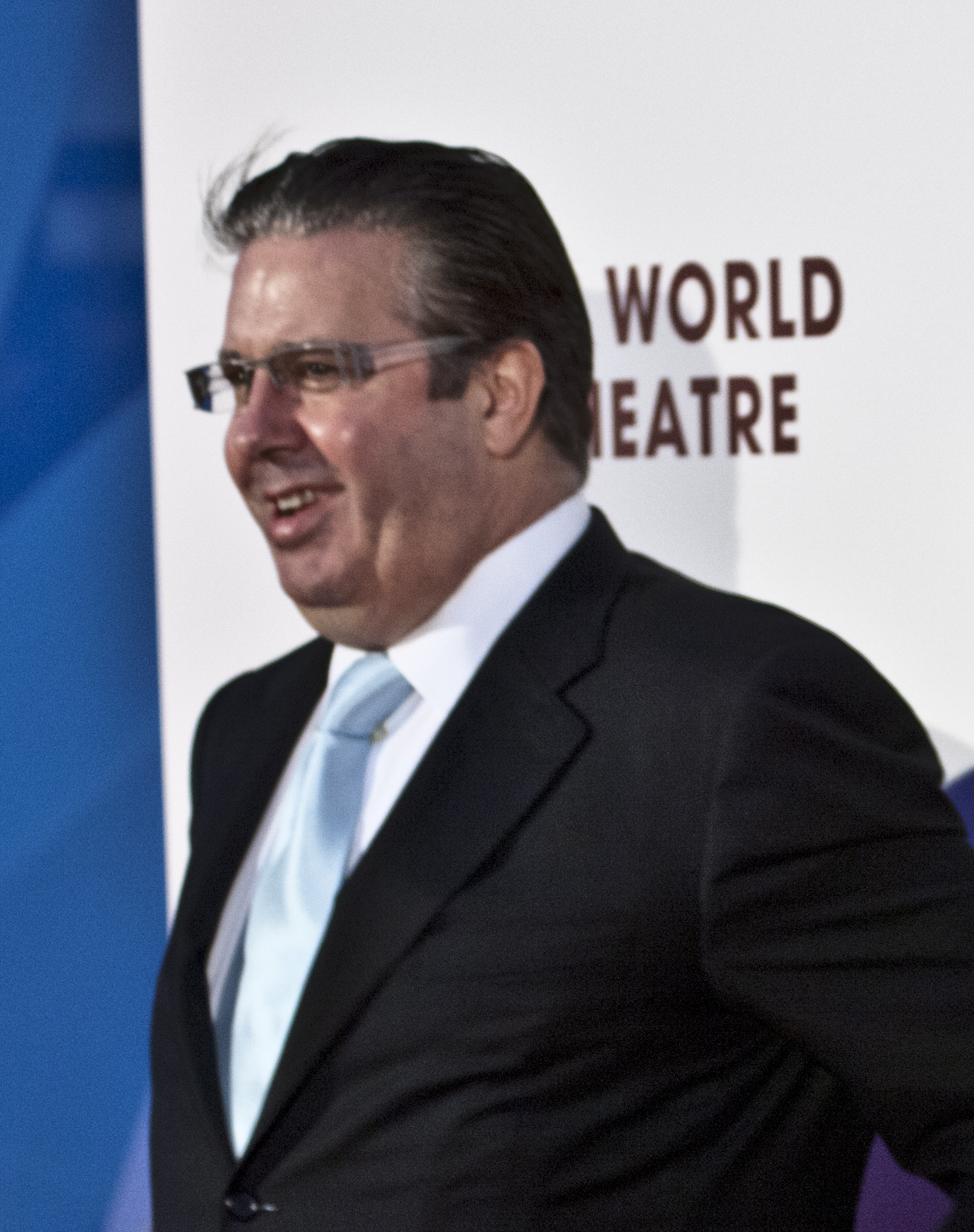
- Ryan in March 2010
- Born: Gerard Ryan; 5 June 1956; Clontarf, Dublin, Ireland
- Died: 30 April 2010 (aged 53); Leeson Street, Dublin, Ireland
- Education: St Paul's College, Raheny
- Alma mater: Trinity College Dublin (LL.B)
- Occupation: Broadcaster
- Years active: 1979–2010
- Agent: Noel Kelly
- Notable credit(s): The Gerry Ryan Show; Eurovision Song Contest 1994; Secrets; Ryantown; Gerry Ryan Tonight; Ryan Confidential; Operation Transformation; The Late Late Show (2008)
- Spouse: Morah Brennan (1982–2008)
- Partner: Melanie Verwoerd
- Children: 5, including Lottie

Gerard Ryan (5 June 1956 – 30 April 2010) was an Irish presenter of radio and television employed by Raidió Teilifís Éireann (RTÉ). He presented The Gerry Ryan Show on radio station RTÉ 2fm each weekday morning from 1988 until his death in 2010. He was presented with a Jacob's Award for this show in 1990.

Ryan hosted several series of television shows, including Secrets, Gerry Ryan Tonight, Ryantown, Gerry Ryan's Hitlist, Ryan Confidential and the first three series of Operation Transformation. In 1987, he earned notoriety and the moniker "Lambo" after an unpleasant incident in Connemara. He was also noted for co-presenting, with Cynthia Ní Mhurchú, Eurovision Song Contest 1994 and, in 2008, presenting an edition of The Late Late Show, television's longest-running chat show, in place of the then regular host Pat Kenny. An autobiography, Would the Real Gerry Ryan Please Stand Up, was published in October 2008.

He married Morah Brennan in 1988 and they had five children. In 1997, Morah famously telephoned her husband's show and, under the name Norah, told half a million listeners intimate details concerning his personal household habits. Gerry and Morah announced their separation in March 2008. He soon began a relationship with the former South African Ambassador to Ireland and the then UNICEF Ireland executive director, Melanie Verwoerd.

Ryan was found dead in his Dublin home on 30 April 2010; his sudden death was said to have brought "Ireland to a standstill".

== Early life ==
Ryan was born in Dublin in 1956. He described his father, Vinnie, as a "slightly eccentric" dentist from a Presbyterian background and his mother, Maureen (née Burke), as "a flamboyant woman" who came from a theatrical background and worked in the theatre. His godfather was broadcaster Eamonn Andrews. He learnt to shoot with Charles Haughey's children. He had two brothers, Michael and Vincent. He was educated at St Paul's College, Raheny, and later studied Law at Trinity College Dublin. Ryan's mother died on Christmas Day 2006.

== Career ==
=== Early career ===
Early in his career, Ryan was involved part-time in pirate radio – presenting a selection of programmes firstly for Alternative Radio Dublin (ARD) and then for Big D. When RTÉ Radio 2 (now RTÉ 2fm) was launched in 1979, Ryan joined RTÉ as a DJ where he presented a selection of speech- and music-based programmes, including Here Comes the Weekend on Friday nights and Saturday Scene on Saturday mornings, which earned him £78 per week. Ryan then moved to a night-time music show called 'Lights out' which accompanied Mark Cagney's grown-up album programme and Dave Fanning's The Rock Show as part of Radio 2's night-time line-up. The trio brought their shows on tour around Ireland. Ryan said they dressed as if they were in a band and behaved as such as well, booking into "awful hotels", drinking heavily and staying out late in "dodgy nightclubs". Their excessive talking has led to Ryan dubbing them "the three big-mouths on at night-time". They were good friends; Fanning was "a kind of hyperactive, Southside rock guru" and Cagney was "this obsessive, meticulous Corkman who would annotate every single millisecond of what he played on-air". The trio also started to put on live shows, some of which Ryan described as being attended by crowds of 20,000.

=== "Lambo" incident ===
In 1987, Ryan and a group of volunteers spent time in the countryside of Connemara as part of The Gay Byrne Show. Ryan claimed to have killed and eaten a lamb to survive, earning him the nickname "Lambo", though the story turned out to be a hoax. The incident has been adapted for the stage.

=== The Gerry Ryan Show ===
Ryan's style was considered by some to be that of a motor-mouth shock jock. The Gerry Ryan Show was subject to several upheld complaints to the Broadcasting Commission of Ireland (BCI), although once escaped punishment when he said "Would it be considered blasphemous if someone said on air that 'God is a bollocks?'". Ryan was noted for the enjoyment he took in discussing topics such as sex, bodily functions, and food – as well as current social and political issues. Disgraced former PR guru Max Clifford claimed, after Ryan's death, he could have, like Graham Norton and Terry Wogan, had a successful broadcasting career in the UK and said he was similar to "Michael Parkinson at his best".

The Gerry Ryan Show, began in March 1988 when he was offered a three-hour morning radio slot. The G. Ryan Show, running from 09:00–12:00 on weekday mornings, consisted of interviews and phone-ins via the "Ryan Line". Each morning he would begin by discussing the headlines of that morning's newspapers. Following the news update at 10:00, Ryan would introduce that morning's Nob Nation, a satirical slot which featured impersonations of politicians and RTÉ media personnel comparable to rival station Today FM's Gift Grub. Ryan presented RTÉ 2fm's only show which was regularly among the top twenty Irish radio shows in Ireland, a show which commanded around €4–5 million for RTÉ per annum, mainly through advertising (one thirty-second advertisement during the show cost €900). This meant RTÉ would have earned €27,000 through advertising from Ryan per day.

In October 1990, Ryan received a Jacob's Award for The Gerry Ryan Show, described at the award ceremony as "unbelievably bizarre and unprecedented – and at the same time being serious, hilarious and unpredictable".

The defining moment of the show came in 1993, when a rape victim, Lavinia Kerwick, rang GRS to air her feelings. For the first time it occurred to Ryan that the story was more important than the question. Since then The Ryan Show became something of a national institution as the oldest show still running on 2fm. Despite repeated reshuffles which have seen all other presenters shifted around, RTÉ have never moved The Ryan Show from its traditional slot.

In 1997, Ryan's wife Morah, from whom he later separated, telephoned her husband's show and, under the name Norah, told half a million listeners that her husband dumps his underpants on the floor before hopping into bed every night, doesn't put his clothes on hangers, had not cleaned the dog's mess from the back yard for weeks and never puts the rubbish out for the dustbin men. When she was done she asked her husband: "You would do that now, wouldn't you Gerry?" The interview was nearing its finish when he realised what was happening after hearing his crew laughing in the Montrose control room. An embarrassed Ryan informed his listeners: "This is my wife talking".

In 2004, Ryan caused uproar when he cancelled an interview with the Taoiseach of the time, Bertie Ahern at very short notice.

British broadcaster Chris Evans credited The Gerry Ryan Show with inspiring him to return to radio broadcasting after a long absence while on a holiday in Killarney.

=== Television career ===
Ryan hosted several series of television shows during his career.

Ryan hosted School Around the Corner from 1990 to 1994.

Secrets was a popular Saturday night show which was not well received by critics. Producer Kevin Linehan, was removed from the show to work on the Millstreet Eurovision and asked Ryan to co-present the event with Fionnuala Sweeney. They later met and Linehan informed Ryan that RTÉ had objected to his proposal. He did, however, co-present the 1994 Eurovision Song Contest alongside Cynthia Ní Mhurchú where he had the honour of introducing Riverdance as the interval act.

He had watched Michael Flatley and Jean Butler put the act together, choreographing it and rehearsing it "fifty or sixty times" and later wrote of being offered the opportunity to invest a stake of £20,000 in the act. Ryan turned it down, a decision he later admitted regretting. Ní Mhurchú later credited Ryan with telling her to not take herself too seriously. After Pat Kenny decided to stop commentating on the Contest in 1999, Ryan was the favourite to succeed him as Irish Commentator. Although the position was fulfilled by his friend Marty Whelan.

He described Ryantown as "the worst television experience I've ever had in my entire life", with producer Julie Parsons (who had previously worked on The Gay Byrne Hour) nearly having a nervous breakdown, according to Ryan. He described RTÉ as "extremely unhelpful".

"Suggestions would arrive at our production meetings: maybe Gerry should wear a hat. Maybe Gerry should sit down. Maybe Gerry should run around more."

Ryan unsuccessfully pleaded with RTÉ to cancel midway through the series. Gerry Ryan Tonight was a chat show that aired two nights per week. Ryan describes it as "no less traumatic" as it nearly cost him his close personal friendship with the producer Ferdia McAnna.

Let Me Entertain You was an amateur talent show in 1999.

Ryan was touted to be the successor to Gay Byrne following his departure from The Late Late Show. Reports that Ryan was to be made producer as well as presenter and given a deal worth £500,000 – higher earnings than Byrne received – proved unfounded when Pat Kenny took over the role in 1999.

Later television work included Gerry Ryan's Hitlist, Ryan Confidential, and Operation Transformation. Ryan wrote in his 2008 autobiography that his critics were not as vocal any more, although he put this down to them "mostly... ignoring me". He is also noted for presenting The Late Late Show on 24 October 2008 when regular presenter Pat Kenny became bereaved.

In positive notices unusual as per his television career, Ryan received praise for his guest role, even coping well with the traditionally difficult comedian Tommy Tiernan whose appearances on the show with Kenny led to complaints. The edition of The Late Late Show that he hosted had the largest audience of any that season apart from the annual edition of The Late Late Toy Show.

The Evening Herald reported that when Tonight with Craig Doyle finished, Ryan was set to present a chat show in autumn 2010.

=== Autobiography ===
In the early part of 2008, Ryan announced that he had been contracted by Penguin to write his autobiography. The €100,000 advance paid by Penguin to Ryan was reported to be the largest ever paid for a book published in Ireland. Would the Real Gerry Ryan Please Stand Up was released to Irish readers on 16 October 2008. In January 2009, it was reported that the book had sold just over 10,000 copies.

=== Earnings ===
Ryan earned €487,492 from RTÉ in 2004, making him the second highest paid presenter to colleague Pat Kenny. He earned €462,442 in 2003, and €601,882 in 2002. RTÉ offered Ryan a new five-year contract worth €600,000 a year in July 2007. Ryan said that just before this he came very close to signing a deal with Denis O'Brien to present a daytime programme on Newstalk which was about to go national. He was offered several millions more than RTÉ were offering him. Ryan considered the deal, thinking of how one of his best friends Willie O'Reilly was head of sister station Today FM and was heavily involved with the other stations. However negotiations fell apart as Ryan cautioned on how delicate the situation was, with RTÉ looking at his contract and deciding if he was of value to them any more. O'Brien allegedly disappeared and Ryan was told he was out of coverage. The irony was not lost on him – "pretty incredible for a guy who owns most of the world's mobile telephones". O'Brien did eventually return but Ryan had already signed the RTÉ contract.

In February 2009, Ryan refused to take a 10% pay cut from RTÉ, even as several other employees in RTÉ took such pay cuts, and declared it "bullshit". On 10 March 2009 he gave a lengthy speech on his radio show, at the end of which he declared he would agree to break his existing contract with RTÉ, and take a pay cut. He was not technically a member of RTÉ staff but was paid through a separate company, enabling Ryan and RTÉ to avoid paying as much tax on his salary.

== Personal life ==
=== Family ===
Ryan was married for 26 years to his wife Morah, with whom he had five children, including Lottie.

When he worked for the pirate radio station Big D, Morah helped him with his programme. She helped her future husband put the music together and carry the equipment. He paid her £3 out of the £15 he earned.

When they first married, the Ryans had very little money. Pat Kenny gave up a bed for Ryan and his wife to use while on honeymoon in Greece. Ryan obtained a mortgage by lying about his salary and bought a little house in Marino.

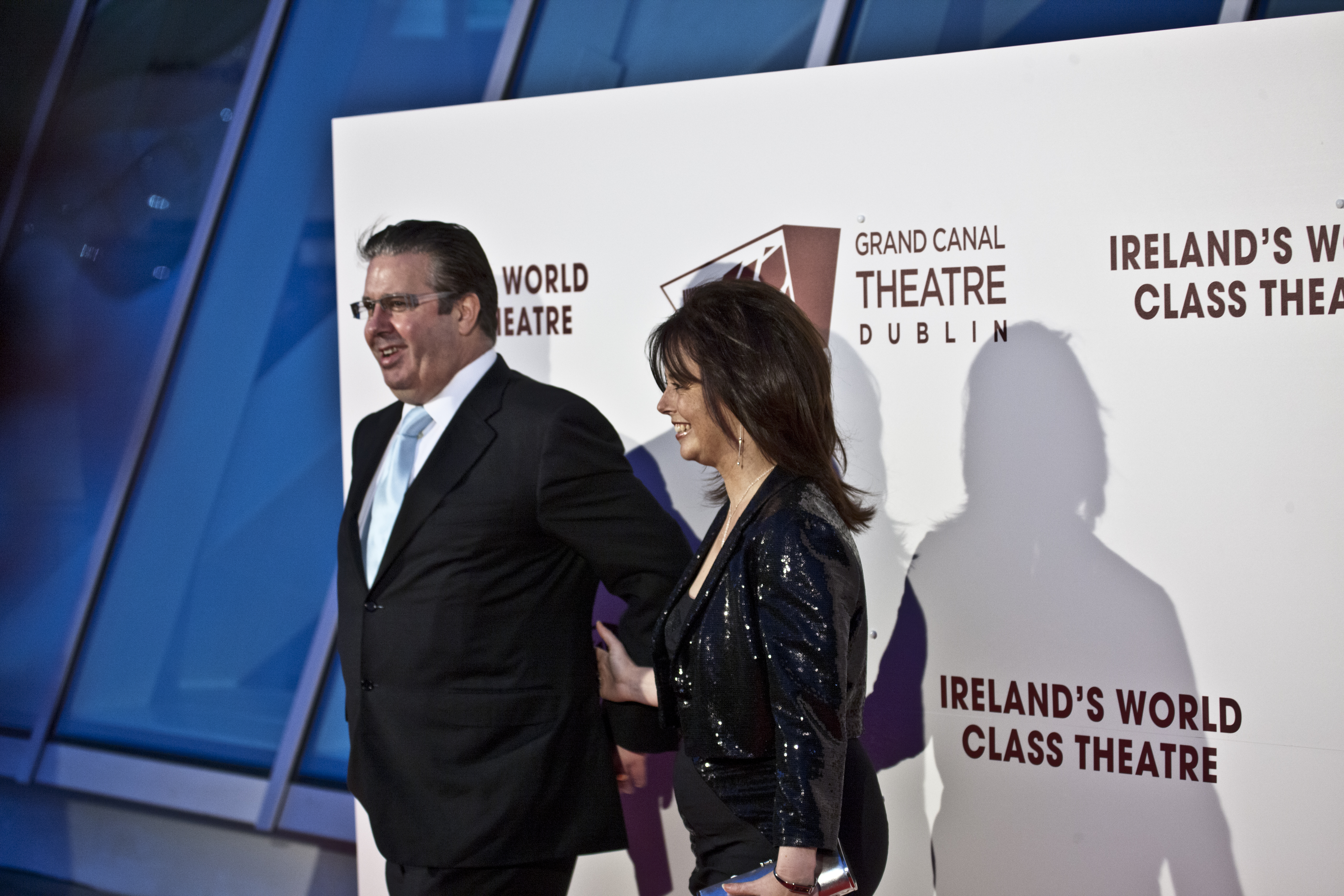
Ryan pictured with his partner Melanie Verwoerd at the opening of the Grand Canal Theatre in March 2010

In March 2008, Ryan announced he and Morah were separating and called the separation "a very painful experience".

Later in 2008, he began a relationship with the former South African Ambassador to Ireland, and later UNICEF Ireland executive director, Melanie Verwoerd. In 2011, Verwoerd said she was "deeply shocked" to have been sacked from the charity because of the publicity surrounding her relationship with the broadcaster.

=== Health ===
Ryan spent several days on a drip in hospital in 2006 due to dehydration after contracting the winter vomiting bug. He also underwent a much-publicised vasectomy which resulted in an infected wound.

After his drug-related death in 2010, reports about Ryan's cocaine use surfaced. Ryan's former sister-in-law, Janice O'Brien said: "Many people who knew Gerry knew he took drugs. It was an accepted open secret for years. He used everywhere – birthday parties, Christmas parties. I'm not the only person in the world that knows this".

Ryan was noted for his love of fine food and wine. He was battling a weight problem for several years and had been taking reductil (sibutramine), a "slimming pill", which he said was effective and safe. Ryan conceded in his autobiography that he drank too much for his own good.

== Death ==
Shortly after midday on 30 April 2010, Ryan was found dead in the bedroom of his home on Leeson Street, Dublin.

Among the dignitaries to send tributes were Bono, Bill and Hillary Clinton, Taoiseach Brian Cowen and President Mary McAleese. The day being Friday, that night's edition of The Late Late Show was promptly given over to discussion of Ryan's life and death. 10,000 people from across the country queued to sign books of condolence. His funeral took place on 6 May, and was broadcast on 2fm, the home of Ryan's radio show and a first for the predominantly youthpop-oriented station. His death also came 16 years to the day after he hosted Eurovision Song Contest 1994.

An inquest showed that the cause of death was cardiac arrhythmia and that traces of cocaine found in Ryan's system were the "likely trigger" of Ryan's death. A considerable public controversy erupted when Ryan's long-term use of cocaine came to light. RTÉ eventually admitted to having given insufficient coverage of Ryan's cocaine habit in the aftermath of the inquest.

== See also ==
- List of Eurovision Song Contest presenters

Media offices
Preceded by Linda Martin	Eurovision Song Contest Ireland Commentator; 1986	Succeeded by Marty Whelan
Preceded by (Republic of Ireland) Fionnuala Sweeney	Eurovision Song Contest presenter (with Cynthia Ní Mhurchú); 1994	Succeeded by (Republic of Ireland) Mary Kennedy
