= The Nualas =

Irish comedy trio (1995–2018)

- Formation: 1995
- Dissolved: 2018
- Type: Theatre group
- Purpose: Comedy music
- Location: London, England
- Members: Sue Collins; Tara Flynn; Anne Gildea; Susanna de Wrixon; Karen Egan; Maria Tecce; Josephine O'Reilly
- Website: https://www.facebook.com/TheNualas/

The Nualas were an Irish cabaret trio known for performing spoof songs. The group — with characters named Nuala, Nuala and Nuala— was founded by Anne Gildea, Sue Collins and Tara Flynn in 1995. Flynn was replaced at several points since 2002 by Susanna de Wrixon, Karen Egan, Maria Tecce, and Josephine O'Reilly. Performing predominantly in Great Britain and Ireland, including the Edinburgh Fringe in 2001 and 2014, they also performed in New York and the Melbourne International Comedy Festival Gala. The group last performed in 2018.

In 1998, they produced a series for BBC Radio 4 featuring Paul Tylak and a Christmas special.

In 2015, they created a song, "Yes 2 Love", promoting a 'yes' vote in the Irish marriage equality referendum.

== Members ==
=== Anne Gildea ===
Anne Gildea is an Irish writer and comedian. Anne's brother is Kevin Gildea, known for his work at the International Comedy Cellar. She was a co-star on Gerry Ryan Tonight. She is a survivor of breast cancer. She has a show called "How to get the Menopause and enjoy it". In 2024, she joined podcaster Dr. Louise Newson on the Hormones and Menopause: The Great Debate tour.

=== Sue Collins ===
Sue Collins is an Irish actress known for parts in Fair City and Raw. Since 2016, she has performed with Dundalk stand-up Sinead Culbert as the DirtBirds writing, sketch comedy and podcasting duo. She is married to actor Phelim Drew, with whom she has four children.

=== Tara Flynn ===
Tara Flynn is an Irish writer, actress and broadcaster.

== Critical reception ==
David Benedict of The Independent described the group in 1999 as "daffy" with a "ludicrously varied musical style", attributing their success to "a cunning mixture of sternness and silliness". Ian Shuttleworth of The FT, in 2000, described their turn of phrase as "gloriously daft", but that their material suited a "large club" rather than a "medium-sized theatre", but that the signs were there for bigger things.

Lawrence Van Gelder, writing for The New York Times in 2001, declared that "New Yorkers in need of laughter can be happy that the Nualas are here" and that, despite their tastelessness, their "wackily original songbook" was a sign of their "undeniable overall talent".

== Shows ==
- Hello, We're the Nualas – 1997
- Big Shiny Dress – 1999
- Older Wiser, and Heftier – 2011
- Glitterbomb – 2016
- Lock Up Your Husbands! – 2015
- One Night of Dignity – 2012
- Hello Again - We're the Nualas – 2014

== Discography ==
- Live & Available - 2012
