= Operation Transformation (TV series) =

Irish reality television health and fitness show

- Created by: Vision Independent Productions
- Presented by: Gerry Ryan (2008–2010); Evelyn O'Rourke (2008–2010); Darren Kennedy (2010); Kathryn Thomas (2011–2024); John Murray (2011–2014); Ray D'Arcy (2016–2024)
- Country of origin: Ireland
- No. of series: 16
- No. of episodes: 128

Original release
- Network: RTÉ One
- Release: 10 January 2008 – 2024

Operation Transformation is a health and fitness programme airing on RTÉ One in Ireland. The show is a cross-media event broadcast via radio, web and television on RTÉ 2fm, RTÉ.ie and RTÉ One since 2008. Prior to this it had been limited to radio but has since expanded onto the web and television. It is comparable to US television show The Biggest Loser.

The fifth series, which began in January 2012, was hosted by Kathryn Thomas with the radio element provided by RTÉ Radio 1's The John Murray Show. Initially presented (up to season 2) by reporter Evelyn O'Rourke replaced by Darren Kennedy (season 3), the event saw six hopefuls, selected by Gerry Ryan on his radio show, attempt to reshape their lives as they are supported and guided by a panel of experts in the fields of fitness, nutrition and psychology in order to reach their individual goals. O'Rourke performed the role of "cheerleader" to her companion Gerry Ryan's "ringmaster".

There are weekly updates on television, daily updates on radio and a 24/7 live webcam on a dedicated site within RTÉ.ie for a period of seven weeks. Each year the event culminates in a grand finale, in which the contestants present their new selves to their loved ones and the viewing and listening public. Gerry Ryan himself said on air that he was two stone (13 kg) lighter following the 2008 event than he was before it began. Several politicians took part in 2010. Gerry Ryan died suddenly in 2010, so the show ended up in the hands of Kathryn Thomas (TV) and RTÉ Radio 1's The John Murray Show in 2011.

Ray D'Arcy presented the radio part of the show from 2016 onwards. In May 2024 it was announced that the programme is to end after 17 years.

== History ==
=== 2008 ===
Summary

The 2008 event saw six hopefuls, selected by Ryan on his radio show, attempt to reshape their lives as they were supported and guided by a panel of experts in the fields of fitness, nutrition and psychology in order to reach their individual goals. There were weekly updates on television (broadcast at 20:30 on Thursday nights), daily updates on radio and a 24/7 live webcam on a dedicated site within RTÉ.ie for a period of seven weeks. The event culminated in a grand finale from the Pavilion Shopping Centre in Swords, County Dublin, broadcast on Thursday 28 February 2008, in which the six contestants presented their new selves to their loved ones and the viewing and listening public. The 2008 event had over 2 million hits. Six months after the show's finale, the television programme Operation Transformation Revisited was commissioned to investigate the welfare of the contestants. 2008 contestant Donal Looney completed the Dublin Marathon inside four hours in 2009. It was reported that Eamon Joyce had hurt his knee and couldn't take part.

Leaders

Three males and three females, selected from Ryan's radio listenership, partook in the television show. The final six participants were announced on Friday, 7 December 2007 on The Gerry Ryan Show.

Ryan caused upset when he suggested Violet O'Shea had not lost any weight despite following the programme. However, as she continued, she eventually did begin to lose weight. Her brother Christopher read a poem of encouragement on air and "the nation wept". Violet O'Shea is now five stone (32 kg). Eamon Joyce lost four stone (25 kg) in total.

Name	Age (at time of selection)	Location	Occupation
Eamonn Joyce	36	Wicklow	Chef
Evelyn Farrell	37	Westmeath	Accountant
Donal Looney	42	Tipperary	Ready mix driver
Louise Collins	21	Cork	Pre-school teacher
Ollie Hannah Murtagh	29	Monaghan	Adult education teacher
Violet O'Shea	44	Raheny	Taxi driver

Experts

Four individuals sat on a panel of experts.

Name	Profession	Link
Dr. Eva Orsmond	Medical doctor	
Dr. Ian Gargan	Psychologist	
Karl Henry	Personal trainer	
Marietta Doran	Fashion stylist	

=== 2009 ===
Summary

OT 2009 was launched by Ryan and O'Rourke on The Gerry Ryan Show on 3 November 2008. For the first time, there was an Operation Transformation Roadshow, which took place at a number of destinations throughout November and December. Each morning, O'Rourke would be at the specified location and would report to GRS over the morning.

Date	Location
18 November 2008	Radisson SAS Hotel & Spa, Galway
20 November 2008	Sheraton Hotel & Spa Fota Island Resort, Cork
24 November 2008	Sheraton Athlone Hotel
2 December 2008	Burlington Hotel, Dublin

The show began airing on RTÉ radio, television and online in January 2009, accompanied by The Afternoon Show.

Experts

Three individuals sat on a panel of experts.

Name	Profession
Dr. Eva Orsmond	Medical doctor
Karl Henry	Personal trainer
Pat Henry	Yoga therapist/Potentialist/Fitness consultant

Leaders

On 4 December, the final 25 appeared on The Gerry Ryan Show live from studio one "in the bowels" of RTÉ's Donnybrook studios. The six leaders were announced on 8 December. The show ran from 8 January until 26 February on RTÉ One. The website had over one million hits, a 41 per cent increase on the previous year.

Name	Age (at time of selection)	Location	Weight (at beginning of challenge)	Target weight loss
Kelly Brouder	31	Limerick	14 st 13.5 lb (95.0 kg)	2 st (12.7 kg)
Keith Anthony	44	Cork	20 st 6.5 lbs (130.0 kg)	3 st (19.0 kg)
Mick Boyce	26	Dublin	17 st (108.0 kg)	2.5 st (15.9 kg)
Colette Cronin	33	Dundalk	14 st 11 lbs (93.9 kg)	2 st (12.7 kg)
Denise Ryan	28	Tipperary	19 st 8 lbs (124.3 kg)	3 st (19.0 kg)
Jean Kelly	47	Dublin	14 st 1 lb (89.4 kg)	1.5 st (9.5 kg)

=== 2010 ===
Summary

OT 2010 began on television at 20:00 on RTÉ One on 13 January 2010. For the first time politicians, including the now internationally famous Paul Gogarty, took part. Gerry Ryan appeared on The Late Late Show to discuss the programme on 15 January 2010.

Ciara Dunne (a nurse), Amanda Casey, Conor O'Connor, Anna Naughton and Penny Dwyer all participated.

They lost more than ten stones (63 kg) in weight between them all during the series. Deputy Seán Connick shed 20 pounds (9.1 kg). Senator Nicky McFadden shed 22 pounds (10.0 kg). Deputy Fergus O'Dowd shed 24½ pounds (11.1 kg).

The final episode of the series was broadcast on 3 March 2010. The website achieved at least 3 million hits during the series.

The first three episodes of the series each attracted a 30.97 audience share.

Reviewing the finale for The Irish Times, Kevin Courtney observed the "non-stop soundtrack of classic pop songs [which] resembled a 2FM show from the 1980s".

=== 2011 ===
Summary

Five people were chosen: Rachel Walker (Tallaght, County Dublin); Sinead Heffernan (Enfield, County Meath); Emily Piggott (Killarney, County Kerry); Ronan Scully (Knocknacarra, County Galway). The series was broadcast on television from 5 January 2011. The five appeared alongside Kathryn Thomas on The Late Late Show on 14 January 2011.

=== 2012 ===
Summary

Five people were chosen: Adrian Brereton (Edenderry, County Offaly); Natalie Cox (Crumlin, Dublin); Kayleigh Yeoman (Limerick); Grace Batterberry (Castletownroche, County Cork); Killian Byrne (Rathfarnham, County Dublin). They appeared on The Saturday Night Show on 7 January 2012. The first episode, broadcast on 4 January 2012, attracted more viewers than the previous year's series. The participants had shed more than six stone (38 kg) of fat from their bodies by the halfway mark. One of the leaders nearly quit, which would have been the first time it happened.

Viewers also downloaded a fake app to the annoyance of RTÉ.

Thousands of people took part in the Operation Transformation 5k Fun Run in the Phoenix Park on 18 February 2012.

The leaders lost more than 11 stone (5 kg) between them over the series. Killian Byrne lost the most weight: 3 st 4.5 lbs (21.1 kg). Grace Batterberry became a poster girl for anti-smoking and cancer prevention.

=== 2013 ===
The five leaders were: Deirdre Hosford, Charlotte O'Connell, Monica Percy, Gavin Walker and Gregg Starr.

=== 2014 ===
The six leaders were: Jennifer Burns, Deirdre O'Donovan, Paudie O'Mahony, Siobhan McKillen, Sarah Campbell and Marc Gibbs. The six leaders managed to lose over 13 stone between them. This year Operation Transformation teamed up with the Irish Heart Foundation to hold the first ever National Blood Pressure Day.

=== 2015 ===
Experts

Three individuals sat on a panel of experts.

Name	Profession
Aoife Hearne	Dietician
Karl Henry	Personal trainer
Dr. Ciara Kelly	Doctor

Leaders

Name	Age (at time of selection)	Location	Weight (at beginning of challenge)	Target weight loss
Mark McArdle	44	Louth		
Louise Ormsby	44	Dublin		
Veronica Horgan	26	Cork		
Eilish Kavanagh	33	Wexford		
Alan Mullen	28	Westmeath		

=== 2016 ===
The five leaders were: Dan Kennedy, Lucy Dillon, John Conmy, Clare Scanlon and Noeleen Lynam. Dan Kennedy was the first leader to quit Operation Transformation in the nine series it has been on. This was due to Colitis. Dan had a pre-existing medical condition that neither his GP nor the Operation Transformation team was aware of.

=== 2017 ===
The five leaders were: Mairead Redmond, Seán Daly, Yvonne Keenan-Ross, Chris McElligott and Marie Grace. In the first two episodes of Operation Transformation, it lost 80,000 viewers when compared with the first two episodes of the series in 2016. Despite this a spokesperson said that they were happy with the ratings for Operation Transformation.

=== 2018 ===
Operation Transformation teamed up with the GAA for "Ireland Lights up", a campaign helping communities to enjoy healthy walks in the environs of their GAA club. The five leaders were: Mary Diamond 52 from Mayo, Felicity Moroney 30 from Dublin, Wayne O'Donnell 29 from Cork, Sarah O'Callaghan 27 from Cavan and David Cryan 38 from Dublin.

=== 2019 ===
Balbriggan was the location for this year's show. Doctor Sumi Dunne replaced doctor Ciara Kelly, meaning the four experts were: Karl Henry, Aoife Hearne, doctor Eddie Murphy and doctor Sumi Dunne. The five leaders were: Siobhan O'Brien 30 from Dublin, Paul Murphy 41 from Sligo, Cathal Gallagher 48 from Donegal, Jean Tierney 33 from Limerick and Pamela Swayne 36 from Cork. Jean Tierney left 3 weeks into the show after she discovered she was pregnant.

=== 2020 ===
For the first time the show hosted its first couple. The leaders were Andrea Rea 31, Barry Rea 39 both Cork, Lorraine O'Neill 46 from Cavan, Tanya Carroll 33 from Cork, Shane Farrell 29 from Galway.

=== 2021 ===
Summary

Five people were chosen: Andrew Burke-Hannon (Dublin), Hazel Hartigan (Limerick), Sharon Gaffney (Dublin), Susuana Komolafe (Cavan) and Paul Devaney (Galway).

=== 2022 ===
There were a few changes to the show this year. The weigh-in outfits were no longer lycra crop tops, bicycle shorts and leggings. Instead the contestants wore leisure wear. The five leaders were: Katie Jones, Kathleen Hurley Mullins, John Ryan, Stefano Sweetman and Sarah O'Connor Ryan.

=== 2023 ===
This year there is a new blue OT logo. Dietician Sophie Pratt replaced Aoife Hearne as an expert. The five leaders are: Stephanie Bowden, Andrea Day, Thomas Hynes, Lorraine Dempsey and Marie Clear.

== International ==
In 2013, the rights to the format were bought by Belgian and Dutch television stations. The Belgian version was entitled Let's Get Fit. Programme producer Philip Kampff had expressed wanting to pitch it to the United States previously but was finding it difficult, due to the non-competitive nature of the format. However, the following year, it was reported that an American broadcaster was interested in the format.

== Spin-offs and related shows ==
In 2016 and 2017 there was a Celebrity Operation Transformation.

In 2020 during the COVID-19 Pandemic there was a spin-off called "Operation Transformation: Keeping Well Apart". There were no weight targets.

In 2023 former leader Katie Jones started hosting an Operation Transformation podcast.
