= Ardal O'Hanlon =

Irish comedian and actor (born 1965)

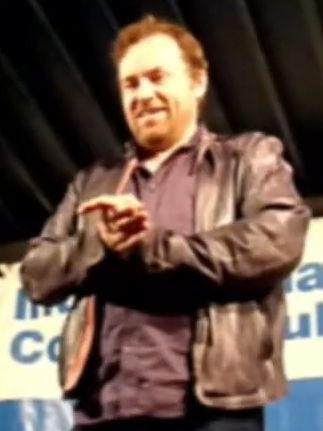
- O'Hanlon in 2009
- Born: 8 October 1965 (age 61); Carrickmacross, County Monaghan, Ireland
- Education: Blackrock College
- Alma mater: National Institute for Higher Education Dublin
- Occupations: Actor; comedian
- Years active: 1991–present
- Spouse: Melanie O'Hanlon
- Children: 3
- Father: Rory O'Hanlon
- Relatives: Peter Fenelon Collier

Ardal O'Hanlon (/oʊˈhænlən/; born 8 October 1965) is an Irish comedian, actor, and author. He played Father Dougal McGuire in Father Ted (1995–1998), George Sunday/Thermoman in My Hero (2000–2005), and DI Jack Mooney in Death in Paradise (2017–2020). He has written three novels The Talk of the Town (1998), Brouhaha (2022) and A Plot to Die For (2026).

== Early life ==
O'Hanlon was born in Carrickmacross, County Monaghan, the son of Fianna Fáil TD and physician Rory O'Hanlon and Teresa (née Ward). He is the third of six children and has three brothers and two sisters. His paternal grandfather, Michael 'Mick' O'Hanlon, was a member of the Fourth Northern Division of the Irish Republican Army (IRA), and assisted members of Michael Collins' 'Squad' on Bloody Sunday.

O'Hanlon was raised Catholic. Growing up, he was "watchful [...] shy, weird, awkward" and had a great interest in literature and knowledge. Due to his father working from home as a GP, O'Hanlon and his siblings would often enter the house through the windows to avoid the long queues of patients. His father's political status also meant that the family received multiple death threats, including a bomb scare. Due to the threats, O'Hanlon was afraid to sleep at night if his father was not home.

O'Hanlon's father sent him to boarding school at Blackrock College in Dublin, where he began to spend more time writing comedy and poetry. He graduated in 1987 from the National Institute for Higher Education, Dublin (now Dublin City University), with a degree in communication studies.

His first job outside of Ireland was in a pea-canning factory in Norfolk when he was 17. He has also worked as a check-in clerk for an airline.

== Career ==
With Kevin Gildea and Barry Murphy, O'Hanlon founded the International Comedy Cellar, upstairs in the International Bar on Dublin's South Wicklow Street. Dublin had no comedy scene at the time. As a stand-up comic, O'Hanlon won the Hackney Empire New Act of the Year competition in 1994, and was for a time the presenter of The Stand Up Show. For the first fifteen years of his stand-up career, he suffered from debilitating nerves before gigs; "I would get into bed, I'd be sick, I wouldn't be able to eat or read or concentrate on anything — it would go on for hours."

O'Hanlon was cast as Father Dougal McGuire in Father Ted (1995–1998), which he said was his "first proper job in television". During filming, O'Hanlon went to buy shoes. Still being in costume, the seller thought he was a real priest and offered the footwear for free. He and Dermot Morgan (Father Ted) often did their own stunts, and he recalled that on one occasion they were dragged through a field behind a tractor. In 1995, he received the Top TV Comedy Newcomer at the British Comedy Awards for this role. In 1995, he appeared as Father Dougal in a Channel 4 ident ("Hello, you're watching ... television"), and during Comic Relief on BBC1. This was followed by the award-winning short comedy film Flying Saucer Rock'n'Roll.

In a 2019 interview, O'Hanlon said he had attempted to distance himself from Father Ted once the show had finished. He moved into straight acting, alongside Emma Fielding and Beth Goddard, in the ITV comedy-drama Big Bad World, which aired for three series in summer 1999 and autumn 2001. He also had a minor role in The Butcher Boy as Joe's (Francie's best friend) father, and appeared in an episode of the original Whose Line is it Anyway?. In 2000, O'Hanlon starred in the comedy series My Hero, in which he played a naive superhero from the planet Ultron. His character juggled world-saving heroics with life in suburbia. He stayed in the role until the first episode of series 6 in July 2006, when he was replaced by James Dreyfus during the same episode. In September 2001, O'Hanlon appeared on stage alongside Moby at the Slane Festival to perform a duet of My Lovely Horse.

O'Hanlon provided the voice of the lead character in the three Christmas television cartoon specials of Robbie the Reindeer. He appeared in the 2005 BBC One sitcom Blessed, written by Ben Elton, which was publicly slated by Jonathan Ross, albeit in jest, at the 2005 British Comedy Awards. Towards the end of 2005, O'Hanlon played an eccentric Scottish character, Coconut Tam, in the family based film, The Adventures of Greyfriars Bobby. In 2015, he appeared on the same channel as incompetent angel Smallbone in the sitcom The Best Laid Plans.

In 2006, O'Hanlon wrote and presented an RTÉ television series called Leagues Apart, in which he investigated the biggest and most passionate football rivalries in several European countries. Included were Roma vs Lazio in Italy, Barcelona vs Real Madrid in Spain, and Galatasaray vs Fenerbahce in Turkey. He followed this with another RTÉ show, So You Want To Be Taoiseach? in 2007, a political series in which he gave tongue-in-cheek advice on how to go about becoming Taoiseach of Ireland.

O'Hanlon appeared in a Doctor Who episode "Gridlock", broadcast on 14 April 2007, in which he played a catlike creature named Thomas Kincade Brannigan. He appeared in series 3 of the TV show Skins playing Kieran, Naomi Campbell (Lily Loveless)'s politics teacher, who attempts to kiss her, and forms a relationship with Naomi's mother (Olivia Colman). O'Hanlon played the lead role in the Irish comedy television programme Val Falvey, TD on RTÉ One. In February 2011, he returned to the Gate Theatre, Dublin, starring in the Irish premiere of Christopher Hampton's translation of Yasmina Reza's God of Carnage, alongside Maura Tierney. Later that year, he appeared in the comedy panel show Argumental. In 2012, he performed in the Edinburgh Fringe

O'Hanlon has written a novel, The Talk of the Town (known in the United States as Knick Knack Paddy Whack), which was published in 1998. The novel is about a teenage boy, Patrick Scully, and his friends. His second novel, Brouhaha, a darkly comic murder mystery set in the Irish border country, was published in 2022. In February 2015, he launched the 2015 Sky Cat Laughs Comedy Festival, which took place in Kilkenny from 28 May to 1 June. In 2015, he played the role of Peter the Milkman in the Sky One sitcom After Hours. In February 2017, it was announced that he would play the lead role in the BBC crime drama Death in Paradise, taking the role of DI Jack Mooney following Kris Marshall's departure. He announced his intention to leave the series in early 2020 and was replaced by Ralf Little. Starting in 2024, he has reprised the role in a spin-off series, Return to Paradise.

On 25 November 2021, it was announced that O'Hanlon would participate in series 13 of Taskmaster. He found his experience on the show "liberating" and "probably the best fun I ever had doing a job. He finished in 4th place ahead of Judi Love. In 2023, he played Uncle Jack in the National Theatre's production of Dancing at Lughnasa by Brian Friel, alongside Siobhan McSweeney and Tom Vaughan-Lawlor. In January 2024, he presented his first Irish language show, Inis na nIontas, on TG4, exploring the islands around the coast of Ireland. In 2025, he starred in the video for the single Invisible Thread by The Divine Comedy.

== Personal life ==
O'Hanlon met his wife Melanie as a teenager. They have a son who lives in Houston, Texas, and two daughters. O'Hanlon is a supporter of Leeds United and is a club tennis player.

=== Religious and political views ===
O'Hanlon is a Catholic. Since childhood, he has distanced himself from his father's right-wing political views. He is critical of the Trump administration, and a supporter of Palestine in the Gaza war.

In response to Father Ted writer Graham Linehan's anti-transgender views, O'Hanlon stated that he is "baffled" by Linehan's stance and "feels sorry" for him. He went on to say, "I don't know why he feels the need to do it. I mean, what transgender issues have to do with Graham I really can't for the life of me figure out," and "like most human beings, you just want everyone to be happy."

== Filmography ==
=== Film ===
Year	Title	Role	Notes
1996	Moll Flanders	Gentleman From East Chiswick	
1997	The Butcher Boy	Mr. Purcell	
1998	Flying Saucer Rock'n'Roll	Eddie Johnny	Short film
1999	The Comedy Trail: A Shaggy Dog Story	George Sunday/Thermoman	TV special
2002	Another Bobby O'Hara Story...	Bobby O'Hara	Short film
2005	The Adventures of Greyfriars Bobby	Coconut Tam	
2007	Blind Eye	Immigration Official	Short film
2008	Tales of the Riverbank	Hammy Hamster (voice)	Direct-to-DVD
2009	Wide Open Spaces	Myles	
2016	Donkeys	Derek	Short film
2016	Handsome Devil	Dan Roche	
2016	Twice Shy	Brendan O'Meara	
2021	Rian	McCarthy	Short film
2024	My Freaky Family	Nerlin Flood	
2025	Fran the Man	Jim O'Dea	

=== Television ===
Year	Title	Role	Notes
1995–1998	Father Ted	Father Dougal McGuire	Series 1–3 (25 episodes)
1996	Whose Line Is It Anyway?	Himself	Series 8; Episode 7
1997	Top of the Pops	Himself - Guest Presenter	Series 34; Episode 5
1999	Hooves of Fire	Robbie the Reindeer (voice)	Television film
1999	The Comedy Trail: A Shaggy Dog Story	George Sunday / Thermoman	Television Special
1999–2001	Big Bad World	Eamon Donaghy	Series 1–3 (16 episodes)
2000–2006	My Hero	George Sunday / Thermoman	Series 1–6 (45 episodes)
2002	Legend of the Lost Tribe	Robbie the Reindeer (voice)	Television film
2005	Blessed	Gary Chandler	Episodes 1–8
2006	Leagues Apart	Himself - Presenter	Episodes 1–6
2007	Close Encounters of the Herd Kind	Robbie the Reindeer (voice)	Television film
2007	Doctor Who	Thomas Brannigan	Series 3; Episode 3: "Gridlock"
2008	Who Do You Think You Are?	Himself	Series 1; Episode 4: "Ardal O'Hanlon"
2009	Val Falvey, TD	Val Falvey	Episodes 1–6
2009	Skins	Kieran	Series 3; Episodes 1 & 6: "Everyone" and "Naomi"
2010	Michael McIntyre's Comedy Roadshow	Himself	Series 2; Episode 6: "Leeds"
2013	London Irish	Chris 'Da' Lynch	Mini-series (4 episodes)
2014	Lily's Driftwood Bay	Bull Dozer	Series 1; Episode 24: "Stop! Watch"
2015	Celebrity Mastermind	Himself - Contestant	Series 14; Episode 1
2015	Cucumber	Brian McCoy	Mini-series; Episode 4
2015	Nelly & Nora	Dad (voice)	24 episodes
2015	After Hours	Peter Hannigan	Episodes 1–6
2016	Ireland with Ardal O'Hanlon	Himself - Presenter	Episodes 1–3
2017–2020	Death in Paradise	DI Jack Mooney	Series 6–9 (24 episodes)
2019	Showbands: How Ireland Learned to Party	Himself - Presenter	Television film
2019–2022	Derry Girls	Eamonn	Series 2; Episode 4: "The Curse" and Series 3; Episode 7: "The Agreement"
2020	Irish Pickers	Narrator	
2021	Would I Lie to You?	Himself - Panellist	Series 15; Christmas Special
2022	Rosie Molloy Gives Up Everything	Conall	Series 1; Episodes 1–5
2022	Ardal O'Hanlon: Tomb raider	Himself - Presenter	Documentary
2022	Taskmaster	Himself - Contestant	Series 13; Episodes 1–10
2022	Countdown	Himself	Dictionary Corner. Series 86 & 88 (10 episodes)
2023	The Woman in the Wall	Dara	Episodes 2 & 3: "Show Thyself" and "Knock Knock"
2023–2024	Extraordinary	Martin (voice)	Series 1 & 2 (8 episodes)
2024	Celebrity Catchphrase	Himself - Contestant	Series 9; Episode 9: "Chris Bisson, Ruth Madeley and Ardal O'Hanlon"
2024–present	Return to Paradise	DI Jack Mooney	Episodes: "R.I.P. Tide", "Oh Mine Papa" & “Apex Predator”
2024	Richard Osman's House of Games	Himself - Contestant	Series 8; Episodes 51–55 (Week 11)
2025	Sherlock & Daughter	Mr. Halligan	Series regular
2026	How to Get to Heaven from Belfast	Seamus	Series regular

== Awards ==
Year	Name
1994	Hackney Empire New Act of the Year
1995	Top TV Comedy Newcomer at the British Comedy Awards
