= Val Falvey, TD =

- Genre: Sitcom
- Written by: Arthur Mathews; Paul Woodfull
- Starring: Ardal O'Hanlon
- Country of origin: Ireland
- Original language: English
- No. of series: 1
- No. of episodes: 6

Production
- Production company: Deadpan Pictures

Original release
- Network: RTÉ One
- Release: 22 November – 27 December 2009

Val Falvey, TD is an Irish television sitcom, created and written by Arthur Mathews and Paul Woodfull, and produced by Deadpan Pictures for RTÉ.

The series stars Ardal O'Hanlon as Val Falvey, a newly elected Teachta Dála (TD) in Dáil Éireann, who inherited his seat in the Midlands from his father, and finds himself out of his depth in the world of politics.

== Cast ==
- Ardal O'Hanlon – Val Falvey
- Owen Roe – Pat Daly
- Amelia Crowley – Christine Falvey
- Phelim Drew – John Brolly
- Brendan Dempsey – Dessie Clinch
