= Gerry Ryan Tonight =

- Also known as: The Gerry Ryan Tonight Show
- Genre: Light entertainment
- Presented by: Gerry Ryan
- Country of origin: Ireland
- Original language: English
- No. of series: 3
- No. of episodes: 83

Production
- Producer: Charlie McCarthy
- Production locations: Studio 1/4, RTÉ Television Centre, Donnybrook, Dublin 4
- Running time: 30–45 minutes

Original release
- Network: Network 2
- Release: 9 January 1995 – 26 March 1997

Gerry Ryan Tonight is an Irish chat show hosted by Gerry Ryan that aired for three series on Network 2 between 1995 and 1997. The studio-based show featured guest interviews and live music. Gerry Ryan Tonight aired twice weekly for the first season and once a week for all subsequent seasons. Stand-up and sketch comedian Anne Gildea was a co-star.
