= Tara Flynn =

Irish actress and writer

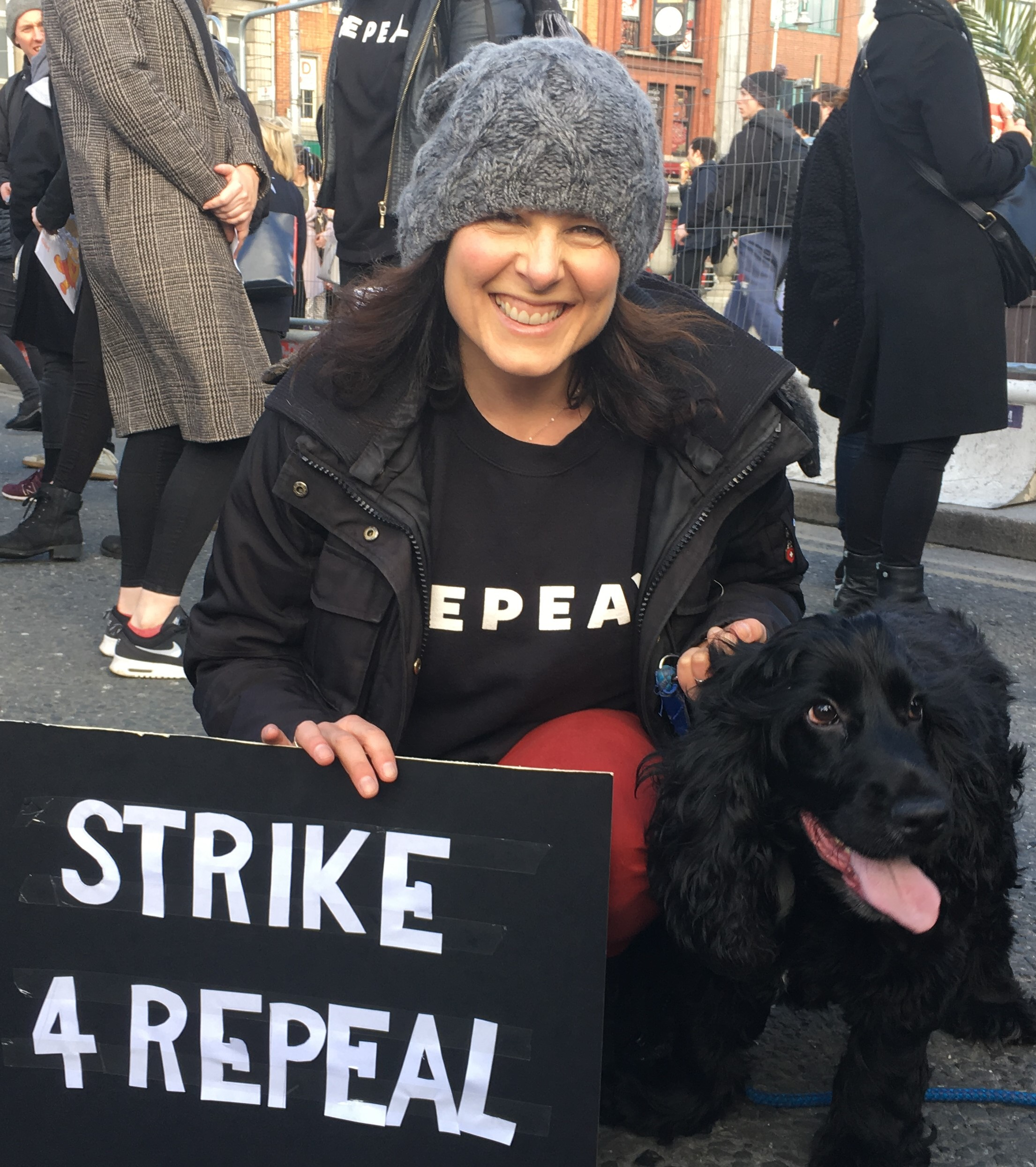
- Flynn at a pro-choice protest in 2018 regarding the Repeal of the Eighth Amendment
- Born: 1969 (age 56–57); County Cork, Ireland
- Occupations: Actress, writer

Tara Flynn (born 1969) is an Irish actress and writer. She was also a founding member of comedy singing group, The Nualas.

== Career ==
=== Published works ===
Flynn has written three satirical books: You're Grand: The Irishwoman's Secret Guide to Life, Giving Out Yards: The Art of Complaint, Irish Style and Rage-In: Trolls and Tribulations of Modern Life.

=== Acting, voice-over work, and media appearances ===
In 2010, Flynn performed a one-woman show, Big Noise, at the Edinburgh Fringe.

Flynn is a voice artist and was the voice of Molly in RTE's The Morbegs. In 2017, she provided the voiceover on TV3's remake of Blind Date. She took over the role first done by Graham Skidmore in the original 1980s show.

In 2021, 2022, 2023 and 2024 Tara joined Marian Keyes for a BBC Radio 4 programme Now You're Asking, in which they discussed problems sent in by listeners (they called them "askers").

=== Activism ===
Flynn has used satire for activism, as in YouTube sketches such as "Racist B&B", "Armagayddon" and "The Case for Mammy / Daddy Marriage".

In 2015, as part of Amnesty International Ireland's "She is not a Criminal" campaign, she spoke publicly for the first time about travelling to the Netherlands for an abortion (abortion was illegal in Ireland at the time). She has since been a vocal campaigner for reproductive rights and the repeal of Ireland's 8th amendment.

== Personal life ==
Flynn met her husband, Carl Austin, at a London bar in 2008. In 2013, a Kinsale man called Austin, an African American, a racial slur. This incident led Flynn to create a comedy sketch satirizing racism in Ireland, which gained 85,000 YouTube views in two days.
