= Leeson Street =

Street in Dublin, Ireland

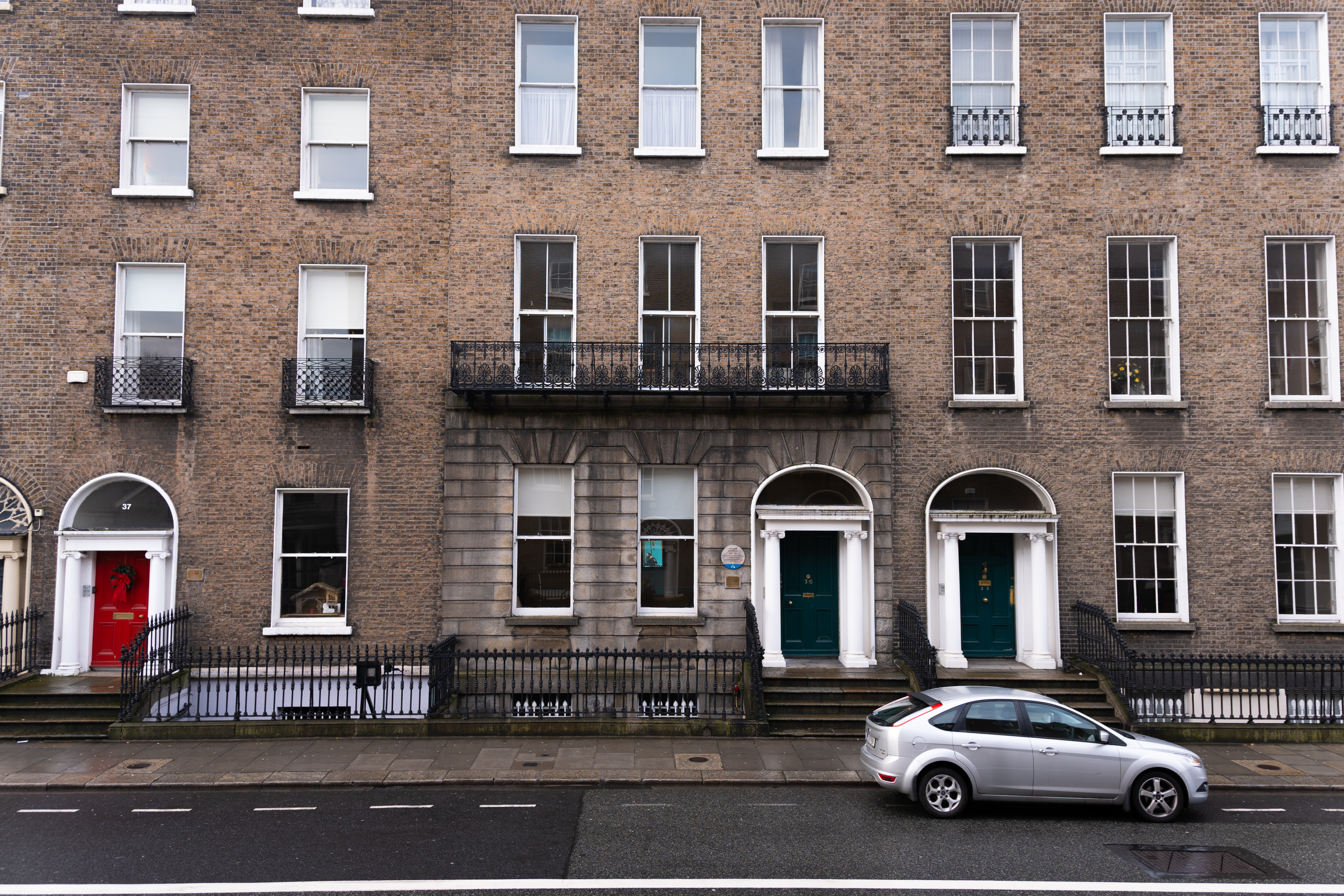
- Lower Leeson Street

- Location within Central Dublin
- Native name: Sráid Líosain (Irish)
- Namesake: Joseph Leeson, 1st Earl of Milltown
- Length: 1.3 km (0.81 mi)
- Width: 23 metres (75 ft)
- Location: Dublin, Ireland
- Postal code: D02, D04
- Coordinates: 53°20′00″N 6°15′16″W
- northwest end: St. Stephen's Green (southeast corner), Earlsfort Terrace
- southeast end: Morehampton Road

Leeson Street (/ˈliːsən/; Irish: Sráid Líosain) is a street on the south side of central Dublin, Ireland.

== Location ==
The street is divided into two parts by the Grand Canal: Lower Leeson Street, in Dublin 2 is to the north of the canal, linking to St Stephen's Green, with Upper Leeson Street, in the Dublin 4 region, south of the canal.

== History ==
The first identification of the street appears to be in the ancient records of Dublin of 1603 when it is noted as a 'Highway' southwards to Donnybrook. It is later also marked clearly as an extension of the south side of Saint Stephen's Green and Cuffe Street on Herman Moll's map of 1714.

The street was referred to as Suesey Street on Charles Brooking's map of Dublin (1728) before being renamed soon after for the Leesons, a family of local brewers, who branched into property development and subsequently became Earls of Milltown. Charles McCready implies that the name in Brooking's map may be a misprint error. By the time of John Rocque's map of 1756, the street is referenced as the 'Road to Donnybrook' and an extension of 'Leeson's Walk', the southern side of St Stephen's Green.

In 1769 a Magdalen Asylum was established by Lady Arabella Denny in the street for Protestant women.

The street is home to several prominent buildings including the main office of the Ombudsman and the embassies of Portugal, Malta, Palestine and Cyprus. The largest building on Lower Leeson Street, along with several adjoining buildings and significant land holdings in the area, is owned by the Catholic University School.

In 1870, Arthur Guinness, Baron Ardilaun built a mansion on the street, which was demolished in the 1960s.

In 1990, Caravaggio's lost masterpiece, The Taking of Christ, was recognised in the residence of the Jesuit Communication Centre on Lower Leeson Street. Broadcaster Gerry Ryan lived and died on this street.

There were formerly streetwalkers along the canal district in Dublin.

== Gallery ==
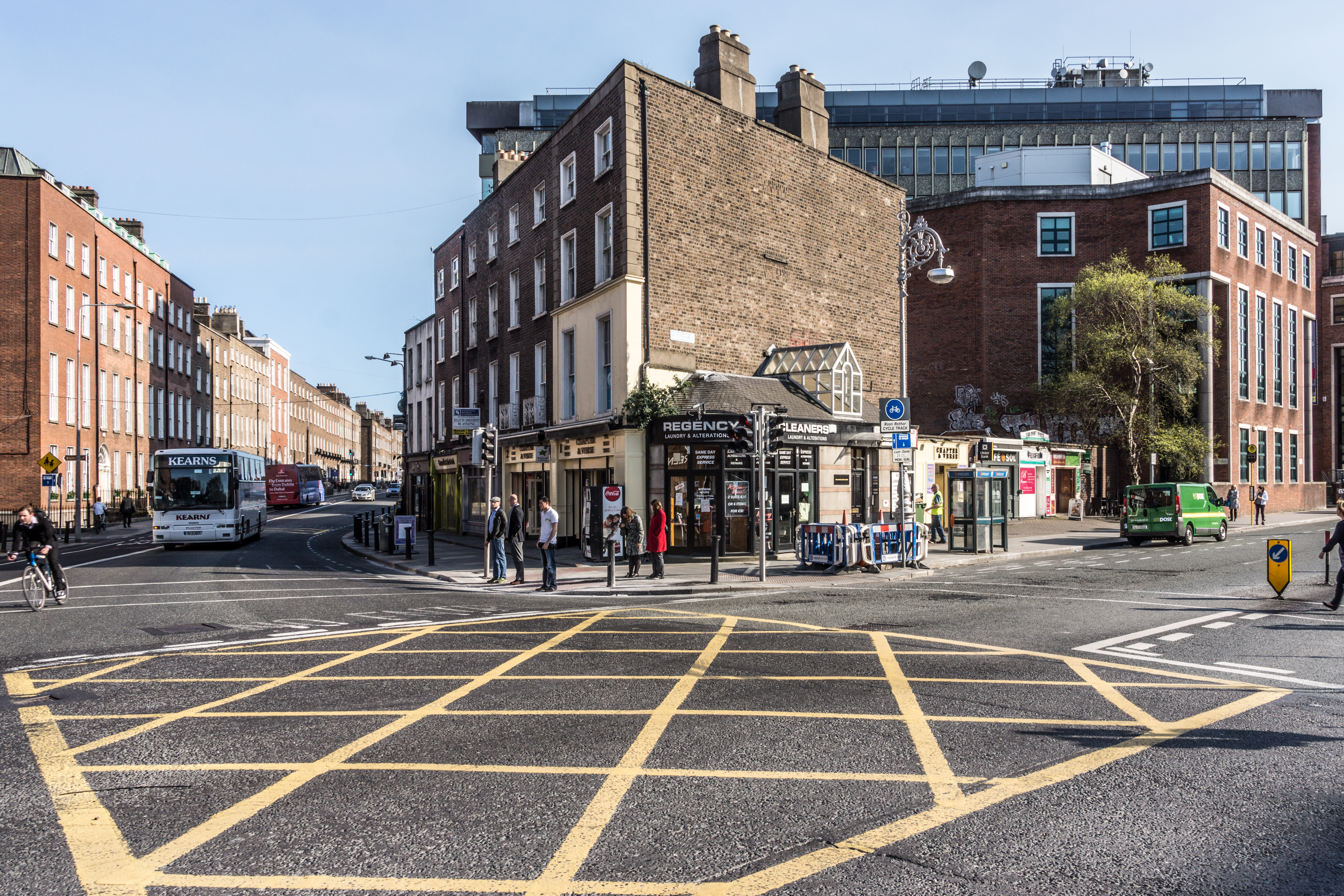
Lower Leeson Street junction with Earlsfort Terrace and St Stephen's Green

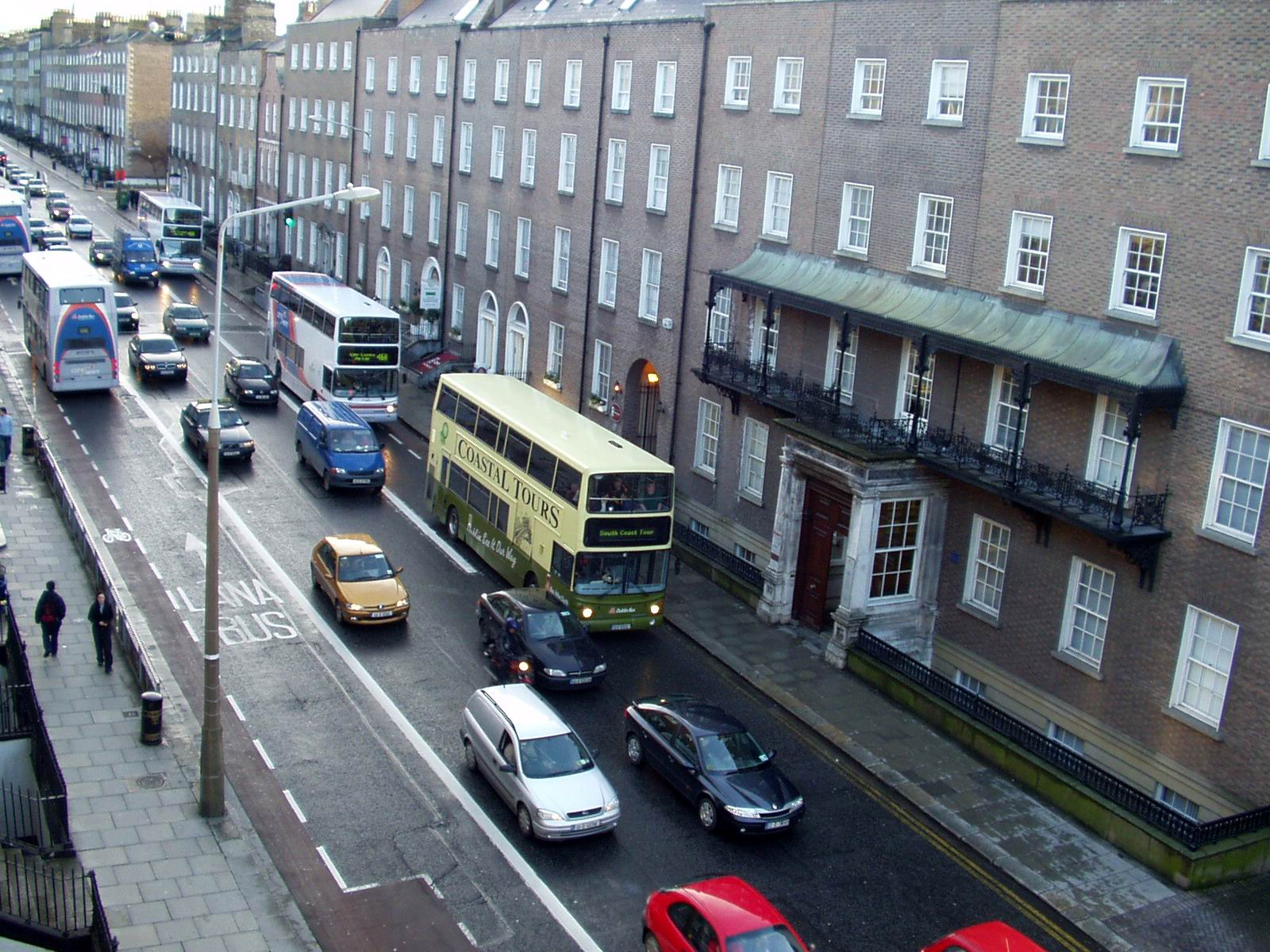
Bus lane on Lower Leeson Street

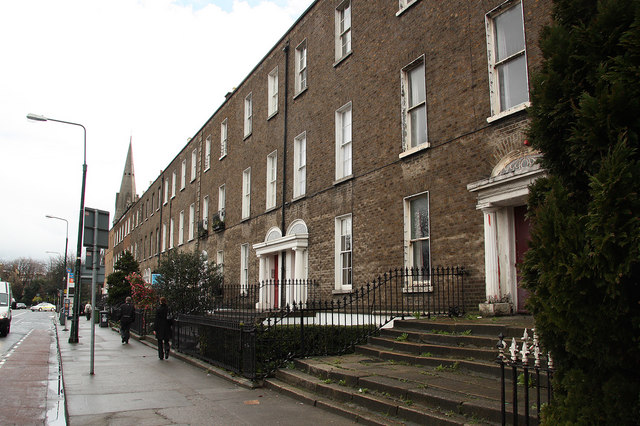
Upper Leeson Street

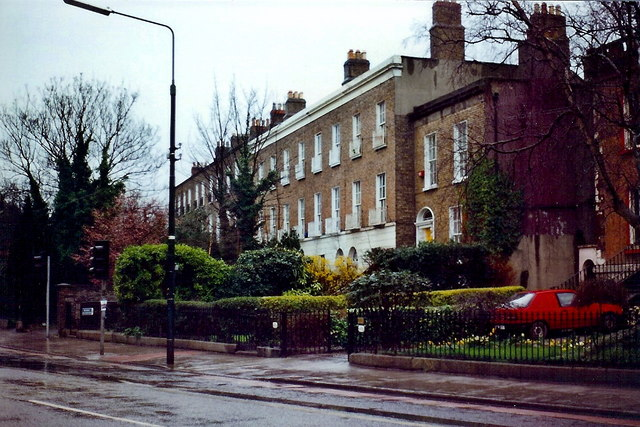
Upper Leeson Street

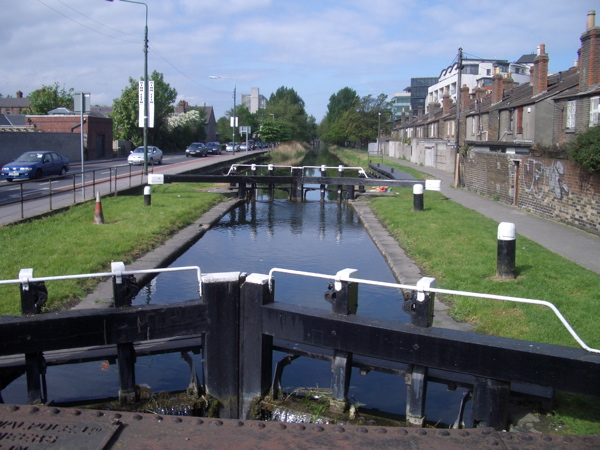
Grand Canal at Leeson Street Bridge

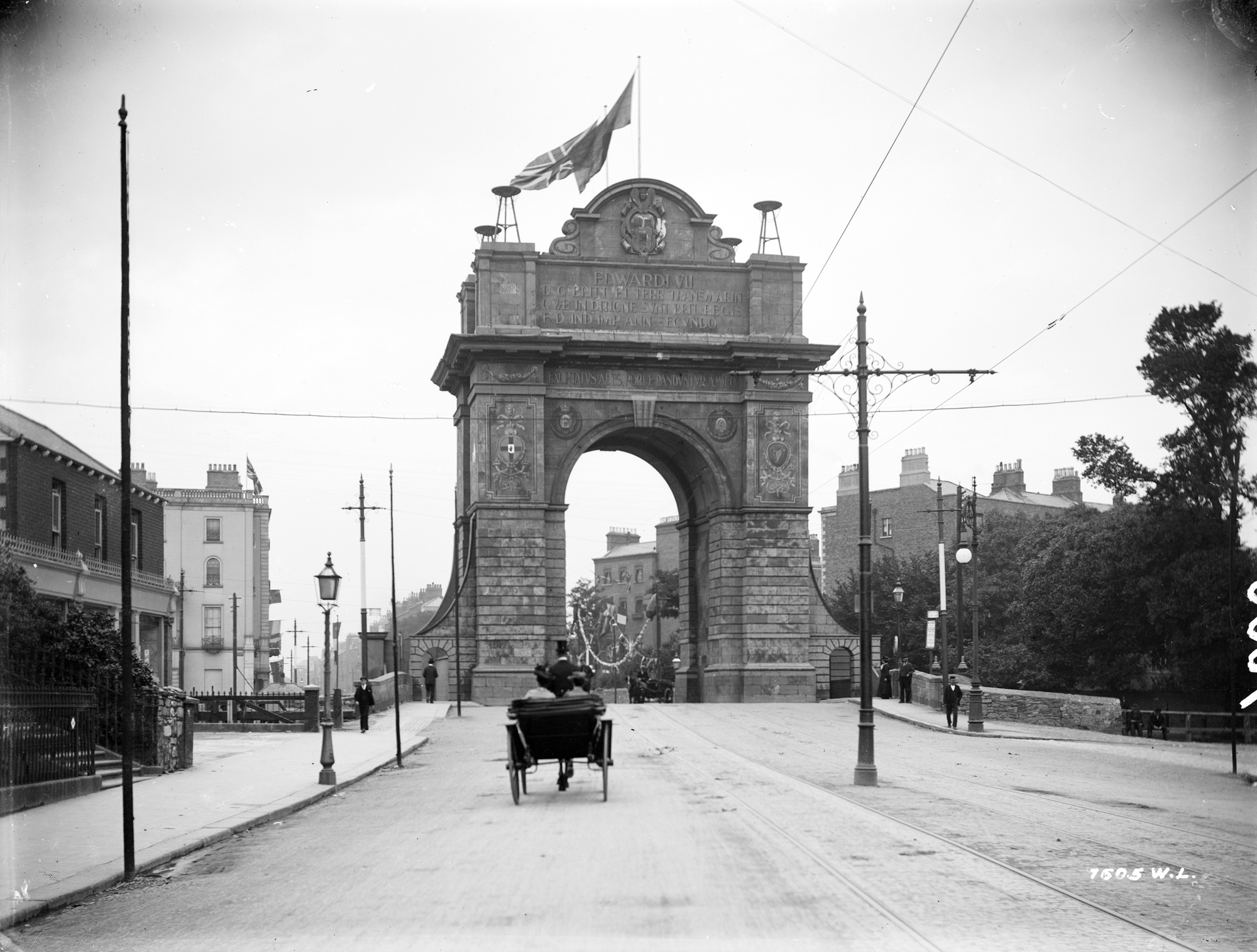
Triumphal arch erected on Leeson Street Bridge for the visit of Edward VII to Dublin in 1903

== See also ==
- Georgian Dublin
- Joseph Leeson, 1st Earl of Milltown
- List of streets and squares in Dublin
