= Phelim Drew =

Irish actor

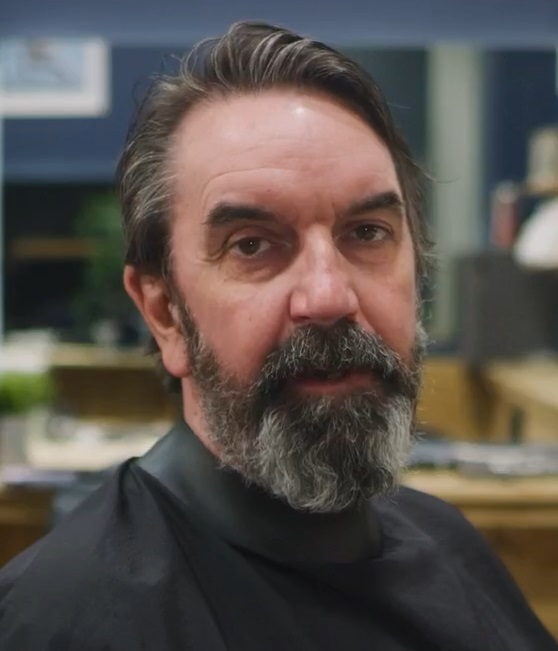
Phelim Drew 2021

Phelim Drew (born 1969) is an Irish actor. His credits include My Left Foot: The Story of Christy Brown (1989), Into the West (1992), Sharpe's Battle (1995), The Nephew (1998), Angela's Ashes (1999), Bloom (2003), King Arthur (2004), The Escapist (2008), Val Falvey, TD (2009), Ripper Street (2014), Clean Break (2015), The Drummer and the Keeper (2017), Dead Still (2020), Fair City (2021), and Tales from Dún Draíochta (2022).

== Personal life ==
Drew is the son of the Irish folk singer Ronnie Drew, who was one of the founders of The Dubliners. Drew is married to actress and comedian Sue Collins, they are parents of four children.

== Career ==
Drew studied acting at Gaiety School of Acting, graduating in 1988.

In 1989, Drew made his screen debut in a film cast that included Daniel Day-Lewis, Ray McAnally, and Brenda Fricker in My Left Foot: The Story of Christy Brown. In 1992, he played Sergeant Brophy, appearing alongside Gabriel Byrne, Ellen Barkin, and Brendan Gleeson, in the Irish Traveller movie Into the West.

In 1995, he starred alongside Sean Bean in the television movie Sharpe's Battle. In 1999, he was in the ensemble with Emily Watson and Robert Carlyle in the Irish drama movie Angela's Ashes.

He appeared in The Nephew (1998), Bloom (2003), King Arthur (2004), and Tales from Dún Draíochta (2022).

== Filmography ==
Year	Title	Role	Notes
1989	My Left Foot: The Story of Christy Brown	Brian	
1991	The Commitments	Roddy the Reporter	
1992	Into the West	Sergeant Brophy	
1993	Fatal Inheritance	Sean	
1994	Widows' Peak	FX	
1995	Sharpe's Battle	Donaju	TV movie
1995	The Long Way Home	Hitchhiker	
1998	The Nephew	Patsy	
1998	The Rope Trick	Anto	Short
1999	The Ambassador	O'Neill	Episode: "Vacant Possession"
1999	Shergar	Donovan	
1999	With or Without You	Drinker	
1999	Angela's Ashes	Rent Man	
2002	The Escapist	Duty Medical Registrar	
2002	Chaos	Aspro	
2003	Bloom	Martin Cunningham	
2003	The Clinic	Gerry	1 episode
2004	King Arthur	Obnoxious Monk	
2005	It Happened One Night	Man In Black	Short
2007	Speed Dating	Dr. Jack Goldenberg	
2007	The Catalpa Rescue	Narrator	Voice
2008	The Escapist	Doctor	
2008	Ronnie Drew: September Song	Contributor / Himself	TV movie
2009	Val Falvey, TD	Party Chief Whip John Brolly	Main role - 5 episodes
2010	An Crisis	Fear na Liostaí	1 episode
2014	Ripper Street	Serenader	1 episode
2015	Clean Break	Detective Tom Burke	3 episodes
2016	Fir Bolg	Bainisteoir Amharclanna	1 episode
2017	Striking Out	Judge O'Leary	1 episode
2017	The Drummer and the Keeper	Jeremy	
2020	Dead Still	Mr. Carew	1 episode
2021	Fair City	Fr Liam Plunkett	4 episodes
2022	Tales from Dún Draíochta	Dragon Driver	1 episode - "Jack and the Dragon"
