= Sharpe's Battle (TV programme) =

- Based on: Sharpe's Battle by Bernard Cornwell
- Screenplay by: Russell Lewis
- Directed by: Tom Clegg
- Starring: Sean Bean; Daragh O'Malley; Hugh Fraser; Hugh Ross; John Tams; Jason Salkey; Lyndon Davies; Jason Durr; Oliver Cotton; Allie Byrne; Ian McNeice
- Country of origin: United Kingdom
- Original language: English

Production
- Running time: 100 minutes

Original release
- Network: ITV
- Release: 19 April 1995

Related
- Sharpe's Gold; Sharpe's Sword

Sharpe's Battle is a 1995 British television drama, the seventh of a series screened on the ITV network that follows the career of Richard Sharpe, a fictional British soldier during the Napoleonic Wars. It is somewhat based on the 1995 novel of the same name by Bernard Cornwell, though the film is set in 1813 on the Spanish-French border, rather than in 1811 on the border with Portugal.

== Plot ==
While on patrol, Sharpe and his men rout some French soldiers who have raped and murdered the inhabitants of a Spanish village. Sharpe and his men rescue a survivor, Miranda, and capture two French soldiers. The French soldiers' commander, Brigadier General Loup, attempts to bargain with Sharpe for the lives of his men, but Sharpe has them shot in front of him. Loup vows revenge against Sharpe as he departs. Miranda is placed under Perkins' protection, with the two eventually becoming romantically attached.

Meanwhile, Wellington receives unwanted reinforcements from the King of Spain. His Most Catholic Majesty sends his personal bodyguard, the Real Compania Irlandesa (Royal Irish Company), composed of poorly trained men of Irish descent under the command of the inexperienced and naive Lord Kiely. Wellington assigns Sharpe to train them and puts him under the command of former Wagonmaster-General Colonel Runciman. Wellington is wary of the capabilities and loyalty of the Irish guard, not least because of fabricated reports in American newspapers that the British army is committing atrocities in Ireland against civilians. So he orders the unreliable men to garrison a fort near the French lines, where it will be easy for them to desert if they want to. Several eventually desert, but are caught and executed by the French.

Kiely's wife, Lady Lucy Kiely, and his mistress, guerrilla leader Doña Juanita, both show up in camp, causing a tense atmosphere. Kiely is unhappy with his wife due to a miscarriage. In the meantime, Sharpe has enough time to train the men and strengthen the fort's defences, so that when Loup finally attacks, he is repulsed. Afterwards, Sharpe proposes a quick surprise assault on Loup's headquarters, which is approved by Kiely, Runciman and Juanita.

When Kiely learns that Lucy is pregnant once again, he reconciles with her but sends her away for her safety. However, Lucy is captured by the French. Juanita reveals herself to be a French agent by giving Kiely a secret ultimatum from Loup. He is to let Sharpe and his men commit themselves to the attack, then abandon them in exchange for his wife's life.

It almost goes according to plan. Sharpe's men are trapped, though he himself manages escape and reach Kiely waiting nearby. Kiely refuses to act, so Sharpe fights him, only to be shot in the arm by Juanita. At that point, Kiely finally rebels and kills Juanita. Kiely shows that Juanita had distributed fake newspapers to undermine the Irishmen's loyalty and forced Kiely to cooperate by holding Lucy hostage. Together, he and Sharpe lead the attack against the French, saving the lives of Sharpe’s riflemen. The British win the fight - although Harper is devastated by the death of Perkins, killed by deserter O'Rourke. Harper is able to kill O'Rourke, avenging Perkins. As the battle draws to a close, Kiely is killed by Loup when he tries to free Lucy. Sharpe and Loup duel, with Sharpe killing Loup as the British win the battle.

Now a widow, Lucy leaves the country and the surviving Chosen Men bury Perkins next to his lover Miranda, who Juanita had previously murdered for discovering her treachery. The riflemen salute Perkins and solemnly leave. Sharpe takes one last look at Perkins' grave before moving on.

== Cast ==
- Sean Bean – Sharpe
- Daragh O'Malley – Harper
- Hugh Fraser – Wellington
- Hugh Ross – Mungo Munro
- John Tams – Hagman
- Jason Salkey – Harris
- Lyndon Davies – Perkins
- Jason Durr – Lord Kiely
- Allie Byrne – Lady Kiely
- Ian McNeice – Runciman
- Oliver Cotton – Loup
- Siri Neal – Juanita
- Liam Carney – O'Rourke
- Phelim Drew – Donaju
- Diana Perez – Ramona
- Robert Hands – Jenkins
- Maria Petrucci – Miranda

== Production notes ==
The programme was filmed in Crimea.

== Soundtrack ==
- "Johnny Has Gone for a Soldier"
