= Ryan Confidential =

- Created by: David Blake Knox
- Starring: Gerry Ryan
- Country of origin: Ireland
- No. of episodes: 25+

Production
- Running time: 30 minutes

Original release
- Network: RTÉ One
- Release: 2004 – 2010

Ryan Confidential is an Irish home-produced television programme which was broadcast on RTÉ One until 2010. It was presented by Gerry Ryan, until his unexpected death at the age of 53 on 30 April 2010. The programme was created by the producer David Blake Knox.

The format placed Ryan and celebrity guests in restaurants and hotels, designed to provide a more intimate setting than a studio. Ryan then interviewed his guests. The programme, commissioned by RTÉ's Entertainment Department, proved popular, and ran for eight seasons.

== History ==
Guests on Ryan Confidential included Ben Dunne who spoke of feeling like a "bloody eejit" for provoking the set up of the Tribunals, Colin Farrell whose use of "salty language" prompted a large number of complaints despite an on-screen warning about the show's content and Brian O'Driscoll who appeared replete with "interesting haircut" before an important Celtic League match for Leinster. The Irish Times critic, Shane Hegarty, said of an early interview with multimillionaire step dancer Michael Flatley: ``Gerry Ryan returned to the television screens again this week. He has a habit of doing that, like a fly you thought you'd chased from the room.`` Ryan alluded to the upset this remark caused him in a special Ryan Tubridy Confidential, aired on 16 October 2008 to coincide with the release of the presenter's autobiography, in which the tables were turned on the regular interviewer as he was asked questions by his protégé Ryan Tubridy. Tubridy was selected after RTÉ expressed their dissatisfaction at Ryan's original plan - to interview himself.

The eighth and final series featured interviews with Conan O'Brien, Roger Moore and, Hugh Hefner at the Playboy Mansion. The Hefner and O'Brien interviews were recorded in Los Angeles. In a rare interview O'Brien said he was more comfortable with Ireland than the pressures of American television.

Ryan's interview with Heather Mills from the eighth series was first broadcast the night before his death. A re-edited and extended version of the 2008 episode, in which Ryan was interviewed by Ryan Tubridy, was aired after the presenter's death. It drew an audience share of 40.5 per cent, and 565,000 viewers - the highest ratings for any episode of Ryan Confidential. The final Ryan Confidential filmed before the presenter's death, the George Hook episode, aired on 20 May 2010. It was viewed by more than 400,000 viewers. Hook later described Gerry Ryan as "a superb interviewer".

== Guest list ==
This is an incomplete and incomprehensive list of guests who have featured on Ryan Confidential.

=== Series 3 ===
Guests
Terry Wogan
Ronan Keating
Tim Collins
Bob Geldof
Nell McCafferty
Paul Williams
Jack Charlton

=== Series 4 ===
Guests
Brian O'Driscoll
Max Clifford
Tatiana Ouliankina
Keith Barry

=== Series 5 ===
Guests
Westlife
Brian McFadden
Bernie Nolan
Leslie Grantham
Father Brian D'Arcy
Larry Gogan
Latif Yahia

=== Series 6 ===
| Date | Guests |
|---|---|
| 4 September 2008 | Marco Pierre White; Gordon Ramsay |
| 11 September 2008 | Meat Loaf |
| 18 September 2008 | Jeffrey Archer |
| 25 September 2008 | Colm Meaney |
| 2 October 2008 | Angie Best |
| 9 October 2008 | Boyzone |
| 16 October 2008 | Gerry Ryan ^{1} |
| 23 October 2008 | Cliff Richard |

^{1. Gerry Ryan was interviewed by Ryan Tubridy on this very special occasion to promote his newly released autobiography.}

== Specials ==
A Ryan Confidential Special, in tribute to Joe Dolan, a past guest on the show who had died, was screened on RTÉ One on 24 March 2008 at 18:30.

Ronnie Drew: A Ryan Confidential Special aired on 1 January 2009 on RTÉ One at 18:30.
