= Secrets (Irish TV series) =

- Genre: Light entertainment
- Presented by: Gerry Ryan
- Country of origin: Ireland
- Original language: English
- No. of series: 3
- No. of episodes: 72

Production
- Production locations: RTÉ Television Centre, Donnybrook, Dublin 4, Ireland
- Running time: 60 minutes

Original release
- Network: RTÉ One
- Release: 22 September 1990 – 20 March 1993

Related
- Ryantown (1993-1994)

Secrets is an RTÉ television light entertainment show that was hosted by Gerry Ryan and broadcast on Saturday evenings for three series between 1990 and 1993. The studio-based show allowed viewers and audience members to realize their ambitions and dreams.
