= Ryantown =

- Genre: Light entertainment
- Presented by: Gerry Ryan
- Starring: Brenda Donoghue
- Country of origin: Ireland
- Original language: English
- No. of series: 1
- No. of episodes: 25

Production
- Producer: Julie Parsons
- Production locations: Studio 1, RTÉ Television Centre, Donnybrook, Dublin 4, Ireland
- Running time: 50-55 minutes

Original release
- Network: RTÉ One
- Release: 2 October 1993 – 1 April 1994

Related
- Secrets (1990-1993)

Ryantown is an RTÉ Television light entertainment show hosted by Gerry Ryan that was broadcast on Saturday evenings for one season between 1993 and 1994. It was set in Gerry Ryan's house in the fictional Ryantown. The show was broadcast during the autumn-spring season.

== History ==
Following on from an earlier Saturday night show Secrets, RTÉ devised a new vehicle for Gerry Ryan. The target audience for Ryantown was teenagers and twenty-somethings. Producer Julie Parsons described it as a "family show" set in a house in which "neighbours drop in and people sit around and cook and watch TV" with the TV content being provided by Ryantown News, with its anchor Reggie Ryan, Gerry Ryan's "twin brother." Each week a real couple's wedding video was featured and Brendan Donoghue did surprise outside broadcasts. The show was described as Secrets 2 and a mixture of Noel's House Party and The Big Breakfast.

=== Production ===
Ryantown was broadcast on RTÉ One on Saturday evenings from 7:05 p.m. to 8:00 p.m. The show was recorded on the previous Tuesday before broadcast in Studio 1 in the RTÉ Television Centre at Donnybrook, Dublin 4.

=== Criticism ===
Described as a "dog's dinner" and derided as "the low-point of Gerry Ryan's TV career which has never hit the heights", the show's main running gag was that Ryan had a disobedient dog. Brenda Donohue would arrive on the doorsteps of householders with a roving camera and there was also an identity parade dubbed "Who's Married to Who?". Ryantown was named thereafter as one of the "Top 10 Worst Irish TV Programmes" by the Irish Independent and Ryan was later to admit that it was all horribly "half-baked" and "should have been taken off the air after a few shows". .
