= The Talk of the Town (novel) =

1998 novel by Ardal O'Hanlon

- First edition
- Author: Ardal O'Hanlon
- Language: English
- Genre: Young adult, comedy
- Publisher: Sceptre
- Publication date: 1998
- Publication place: Ireland
- Media type: Print (hardback & paperback); Audiobook
- Pages: 244 Pages
- ISBN: 0-340-74858-3 (paperback edition); ISBN 0-8050-6330-7 (hardcover edition)

The Talk of the Town is the first novel written by Ardal O'Hanlon, published by Sceptre in 1998. It was renamed Knick Knack Paddy Whack for publication in the United States.

== Premise ==
The novel is set in 1980s Ireland and is about life in a small Irish town, where everyone knows everyone else's business. Its tone is humorous but dark. The main character is Patrick Scully, a hapless youth with few prospects.
