= InterContinental Dublin =

Hotel in Ballsbridge, Dublin, Ireland

Coordinates: 53.3265°N 6.2256°W

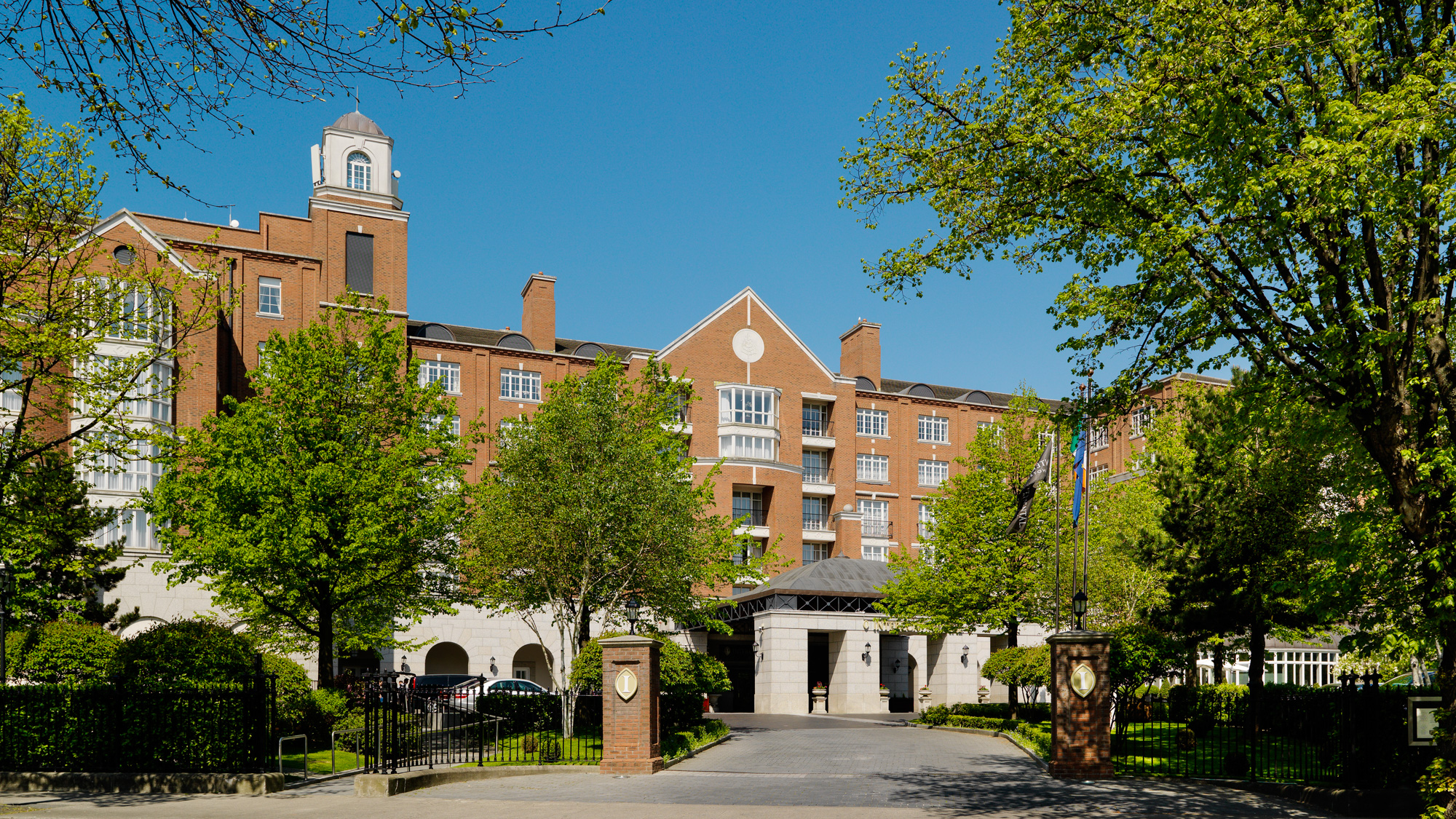
- Interactive map of the InterContinental Dublin area

General information
- Classification: 5 stars
- Location: Simmonscourt Road, Ballsbridge, Dublin, Ireland
- Opening: February 2001
- Owner: John C. Malone
- Operator: InterContinental Hotels Group

Technical details
- Floor count: 5

Design and construction
- Architects: Wimberley Allison Tong and Goo
- Developer: Derek Quinlan (The Nollaig Partnership)
- Main contractor: G&T Crampton

Other information
- Number of rooms: 215
- Number of suites: 50
- Number of restaurants: 1 + 3 Lounges

InterContinental Dublin formerly the Four Seasons Hotel Dublin, is a luxury hotel located in Ballsbridge, on the south side of Dublin. It was part of the Toronto-based Four Seasons chain of luxury hotels and resorts. The InterContinental Dublin was rebranded on 1 January 2015. Built in 2001, the hotel has at various times been included in Travel and Leisure's Top 500 hotels since its opening.

In 2011 the hotel was sold out of receivership by Anglo Irish Bank to the Livingstone Brother's London & Regional Properties for an estimated €15m.

In 2019 the hotel was acquired by a John C. Malone-backed vehicle for an estimated €50m.

The hotel also houses serviced apartments at the penthouse level.
