= International Comedy Cellar =

Comedy club in Ireland

Coordinates: 53.343105°N 6.261779°W

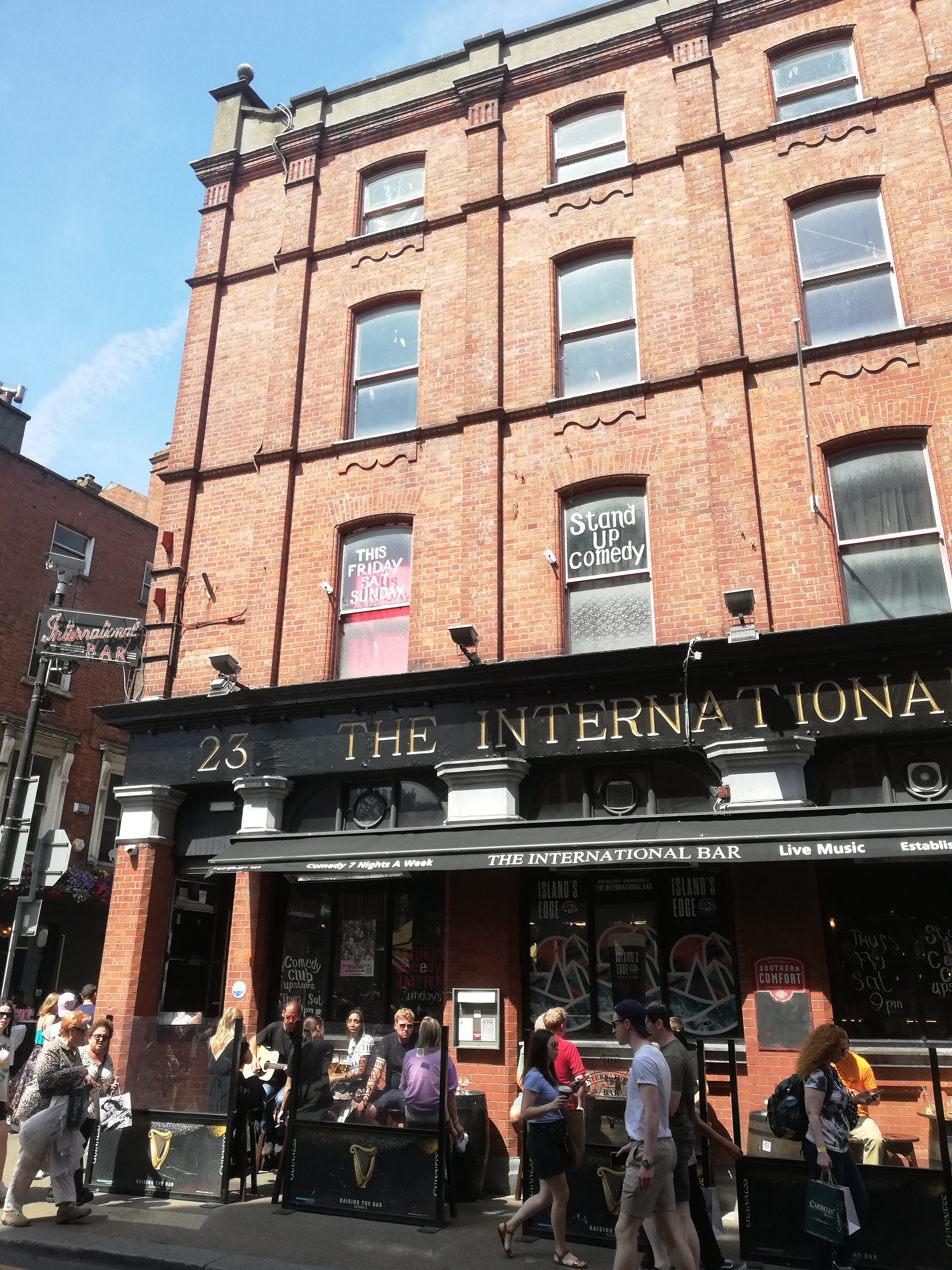
The International Bar

The Dublin Comedy Cellar is Ireland's oldest comedy club located on Dublin's South Wicklow Street in the International Bar. The Cellar was founded in 1988 by 'Mr. Trellis' members Irish comedians Ardal O'Hanlon, Barry Murphy and Kevin Gildea. Dermot Carmody later took on a leading role. Many Irish and UK acts started their careers there including Des Bishop, Tommy Tiernan, Dylan Moran and Eddie Izzard.

The first Thursday night shows were hosted by Father Ted legend Joe Rooney in 1997 as The Mad Cow Comedy Club. They later became The International Comedy Club hosted by another legend of Irish comedy, Des Bishop, and expanded to Friday nights. Under his brother Aidan Bishop, Saturday shows were added, with 2 shows on Saturdays to meet demand!

Now hosted by Simon O'Keeffe, the renowned host and founder of the award winning Capital Comedy Club in the Ha'Penny Bridge Inn and Chaplins Comedy Club in Chaplins Bar, Thursday, Friday, and Saturday shows operate under the banner of Comedy at the International The venue also plays host on Sundays to the Dublin Comedy Improv
