= Cynthia Ní Mhurchú =

Irish politician, barrister and former broadcaster (born 1966)

Cynthia Ní Mhurchú MEP
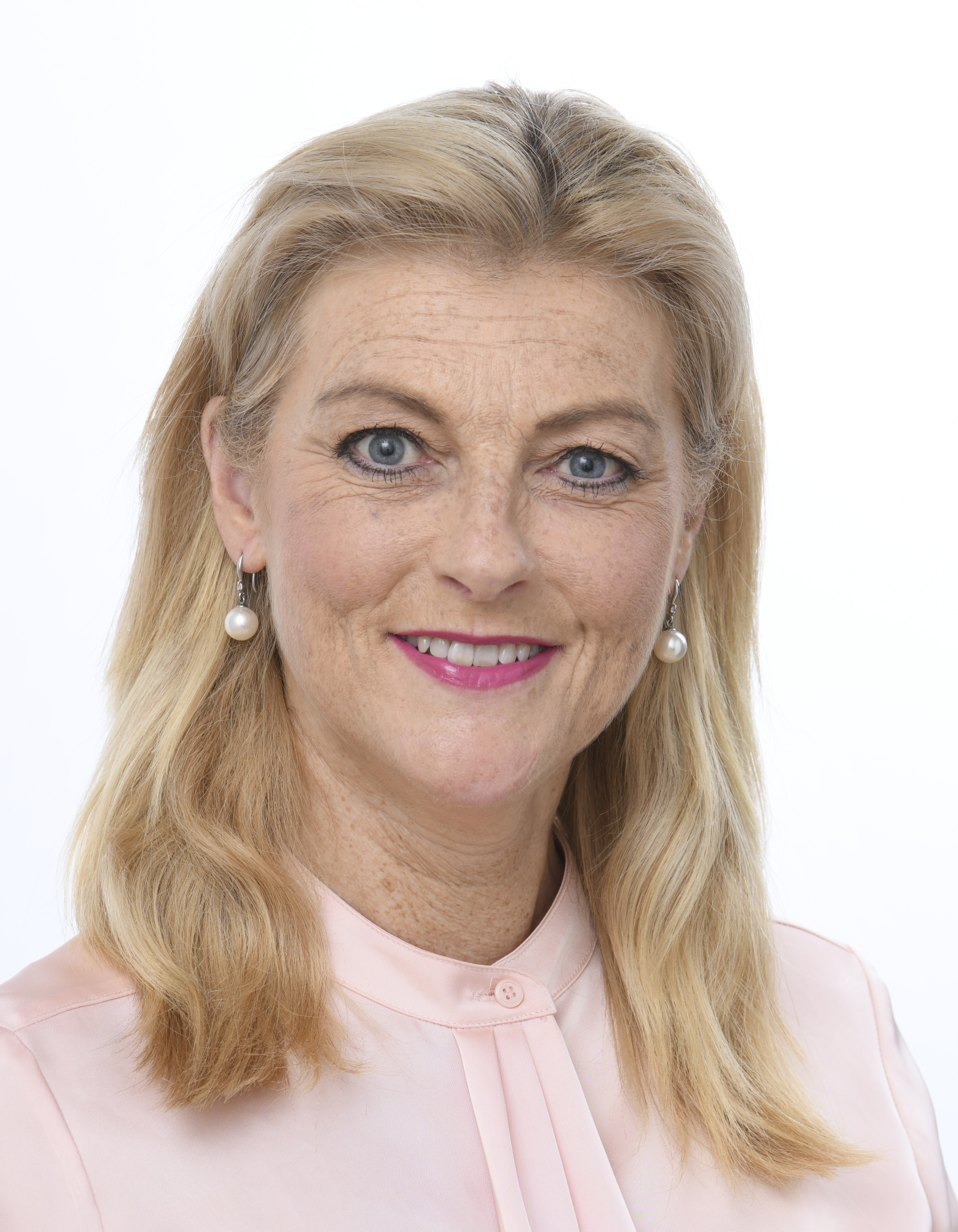
- Ní Mhurchú in 2024

Member of the European Parliament
- Incumbent
- Assumed office 17 July 2024
- Constituency: South

Personal details
- Born: Cynthia Murphy; 1966 (age 59–60) Carlow, Ireland
- Party: Ireland: Fianna Fáil; EU: Renew Europe
- Spouse: John Kavanagh
- Children: 2
- Education: Carysfort College; King's Inns
- Occupation: Barrister; radio host; journalist; teacher; politician

Cynthia Ní Mhurchú (Irish pronunciation: [n̠ʲiː ˈwʊɾˠəxuː]; born 1966) is an Irish Fianna Fáil politician, barrister and former radio host with Raidió Teilifís Éireann (RTÉ) who has served as a Member of the European Parliament for the South constituency since July 2024. As a broadcaster, she presented Eurovision Song Contest 1994 in Dublin along with Gerry Ryan.

== Early life ==
Cynthia Murphy was born in Carlow. Her parents were Brendan Murphy and Columba Murphy (née Brophy). Her mother was involved in local Fine Gael politics in Carlow. She adopted the Irish language version of her surname, Ní Mhurchú, at the age of fifteen. She attended Holy Family Askea Girls School, St Leo's College and Carysfort College, where she trained as a primary school teacher.

== Career ==
Ní Mhurchú initially worked as a teacher in an Irish language school in Carlow and then spent ten years working as a journalist and presenter in RTÉ, RTÉ Raidió na Gaeltachta and as a freelancer. During the 1990s, she presented RTÉ's Lotto draw and the Irish language current affairs broadcast, Cúrsaí. She co-hosted the Eurovision Song Contest with Gerry Ryan in 1994. She has also been a web columnist for several years and has written extensively on education, training and careers.

She became a barrister after leaving RTÉ.

== Political career ==
Ní Mhurchú joined Fianna Fáil as she felt it supported the Irish language. In 1992, Ní Mhurchú was approached by the party to run in Dublin South-East in the 1992 Irish general election but declined the offer as she wanted to study for the bar.

She was selected by Fianna Fáil to contest the South constituency at the 2024 European Parliament election. Ní Mhurchú received 55,209 (8.0%) first preference votes and was elected on the 20th count.

Ní Mhurchú has described her political views as "centrist, slightly left of centre."

== Personal life ==
Ní Mhurchú is married to John Kavanagh and has two children. She is a fluent Irish speaker.

== Parliamentary activities and incidents ==
In February 2026, Ní Mhurchú submitted a formal complaint to European Parliament President Roberta Metsola following an incident during a committee meeting involving Polish MEP Jacek Ozdoba. During the session, as Ní Mhurchú was speaking, Ozdoba reportedly made audible "pig-snorting" noises and other "groaning" sounds directed at her.

Ní Mhurchú challenged the behavior immediately during the meeting, stating, "It is the height of an insult to a woman, to an MEP, to a member to be snorted at with the sound of a pig." In her subsequent letter to President Metsola, she criticized the chair of the meeting, Bogdan Rzońca, for failing to intervene, alleging that the inaction of the male chair toward his political colleague risked giving an "impression of bias and misogynistic behaviour." She requested that both Ozdoba and Rzońca be formally cautioned for the conduct.

== See also ==
- List of Eurovision Song Contest presenters

Preceded by (Republic of Ireland) Fionnuala Sweeney	Eurovision Song Contest presenter (with Gerry Ryan); 1994	Succeeded by (Republic of Ireland) Mary Kennedy
