= Julie Parsons =

Irish radio producer

- Born: 1951 (age 74–75); Auckland, New Zealand
- Occupation: Writer
- Writing career
- Pen name: Julie Parsons
- Genres: Romance, Detective

Julie Parsons (born in 1951 near Auckland in New Zealand) was a radio and television producer before becoming an author of detective novels.

== Early life ==
Parsons was born to Andy, an ex-Army doctor who had been awarded the Military Cross for bravery, and Elizabeth Parsons, who had served in the Women's Royal Naval Service during the Second World War. Her parents had left Ireland in 1947 after returning from the war. In 1955 her father was lost at sea in the South Pacific and never found. He was on a boat for a mission to the remote Tokelau Islands. The boat was later found but not the people on board. In 1963, after her father was legally declared dead, she returned to Ireland with her mother and three siblings. She studied social sciences and sociology of music at University College Dublin.

== Career ==
Parsons worked for Raidió Teilifís Éireann for 13 years as producer on The Gay Byrne Show and the Pat Kenny Show on Radio One as well as many television shows.

In 1998, she turned to detective fiction when she published her first novel, Mary Mary which became an Irish bestseller and was published in over 17 countries. She has since published a number of other novels.

Parsons has won awards for her work and been the judge on competitions like the Francis McManus Award and the P.J. O'Connor Radio Drama Award. Parsons lives in Dún Laoghaire.

== Bibliography ==
=== Michael McLoughlin Series ===
- Mary Mary (1998)
- I Saw You (2007)
- The Therapy House (2017)

=== Other novels ===
- The Courtship Gift (1999)
- Eager to Please (2000)
- The Guilty Heart (2003)
- The Smoking Room (2004)
- The Hourglass (2005)
