= Today with Maura and Dáithí =

Television show in Ireland

- Also known as: Today
- Presented by: Maura Derrane; Dáithí Ó Sé; Sinead Kennedy other presenters
- Country of origin: Ireland
- Original language: English
- No. of series: 14 (2026)
- No. of episodes: 2000 (24 March 2026)

Production
- Executive producer: Colm Crowley
- Production locations: RTÉ Cork, Cork
- Editor: Colm Crowley
- Camera setup: Multi-camera
- Running time: 130 minutes

Original release
- Network: RTÉ One
- Release: 5 November 2012 – present

Related
- The Daily Show Four Live The Afternoon Show Seoige Open House PM Live Live at 3

Today, or Today with Maura and Dáithí, is an Irish lifestyle show featuring several topical segments including health, cooking, men's & women's fashion, makeovers, and travel as well as dealing with popular issues of the day. Broadcast on RTÉ One at 15:30 on weekdays, it is presented by Dáithí Ó Sé alongside Sinead Kennedy (Monday-Tuesday) and Maura Derrane (Wednesday-Friday).

The series is produced by RTÉ in Cork, and is overseen by managing editor Colm Crowley.

== Format ==
Live cookery demonstrations from some of Ireland's top television chefs now forms a daily part of the show with other segments featuring less frequently. Regular experts in each subject appear to discuss the topic at hand. Airing on the RTÉ One television channel in Ireland, "Today" debuted in November 2012, and replaced previous RTÉ day-time lifestyle shows The Daily Show (host by Derrane) and Four Live (hosted by Ó Sé and Claire Byrne).

Today was initially hosted each Monday, Tuesday, Wednesday, Thursday and Friday by RTÉ presenters Maura Derrane and Dáithí Ó Sé being broadcast from RTÉ Studios in Cork. After the end of the first season RTÉ announced that Bláthnaid Ní Chofaigh and Norah Casey's section of the show was being axed. "Today" returned for a second season in September 2013 hosted solely by Derrane and Ó Sé from Monday – Friday from RTÉ Cork Studios. In September 2020, it was announced that Sinead Kennedy had joined the show to co-host with Daithi on Monday and Tuesdays.

The show is broadcasts live Monday to Thursday, with Friday's edition pre-recorded on Thursday. The series broadcast from the end of September until the end of May each year.

In 2026 the series celebrated 2000 episodes. By 2021 it became RTÉ's longest running daytime TV show.

== Reception ==
Bernice Harrison, reviewer in The Irish Times, wondered in advance if it "might be a livelier alternative" to the "afternoon schedules [that] are clogged with antiques and property programmes". The eighth season of the show was extended by two weeks due to a rise in viewers as a result of the COVID-19 pandemic.

Preceded by The Daily Show/Four Live	Afternoon programming on Telefís Éireann; 2014–present	Succeeded by Incumbent
