= 1997 in Irish television =

The following is a list of events relating to television in Ireland from 1997.

== Events ==
=== January ===
- 4 January – Irish television debut of US animated series Chip 'n Dale: Rescue Rangers on Network 2.
- 8 January – Bob Collins is appointed Director-General of RTÉ.
- 13 January – RTÉ 1 screens a 26-minute drama short called Summertime starring Michael Townsend, Jason O'Mara, Natalie Stringer and Les Martin.

=== March ===
- 30 March – Channel 5, the UK's fifth and last terrestrial channel, launches at 6.00pm. The first faces seen are the Spice Girls, who perform 1-2-3-4-5, a rewritten version of the Manfred Mann song 5-4-3-2-1. The channel is available in some parts of Ireland.

=== May ===
- 3 May – Ireland hosts the 42nd Eurovision Song Contest. It is presented by Carrie Crowley and Ronan Keating from the Point Theatre in Dublin. Televoting is introduced in five of the 25 countries competing.

=== June ===
- 12 June – Síle de Valera is appointed Minister for Arts, Heritage, Gaeltacht and the Islands with responsibility for broadcasting.
- 30 June – Long running US animated series The Simpsons starts airing on Irish television for the first time after not being shown for a long time since it was a series of animated shorts on the US variety show The Tracey Ullman Show. It will be first broadcast on Network 2 starting off with the final episode of the first season "Some Enchanted Evening" (which was originally meant to be the first episode of the series despite being the first one to be produced and made).

=== September ===
- 2 September – Long running American-Canadian animated series Arthur based on Marc Brown's well known books begins airing for the first time on Irish television on Teilifís na Gaeilge as part of its children's block Cúlabúla. It was translated and dubbed into Irish with the title Art ó Ruíarc although the original English version can be viewed on BBC and Nickelodeon via access to UK television broadcasting. The English version will start airing on Network 2 in 2003.
- 8 September – The Den returns to Network 2 with Ray D'Arcy as host once again after another summer break. The block opens up with some new series including debuts of the British children's animation Enid Blyton's Enchanted Lands (before airing in its original country which won't happen until 29 September) and the smash Nickelodeon hit Rugrats plus more episodes of Tom and Jerry Kids, The Enid Blyton Secret Series and Pinky and the Brain and the Irish programmes including Echo Island as well as Den TV's segments Den Pet Vet and The Joke Box.
- September – The RTÉ Authority seeks permission from the Irish Government to find a partner to fund digital terrestrial television (DTT).

=== November ===
- Unknown RTE1 and Network 2 weather are split.
- 24 November – The two mean puppet characters Podge and Rodge from the long running children's programme The Den star in their very own adults only series A Scare at Bedtime. The first episode premieres on Network 2.

== Debuts ==
=== RTÉ 1 ===
- 13 January – Summertime (1997)
- 14 June – Kennedy (1997)
- Autumn – PM Live (1997–1999)

=== Network 2 ===
- 4 January – Chip 'n Dale: Rescue Rangers (1989–1990)
- 4 January – The Adventures of Hyperman (1995–1996)
- 4 January – Quack Pack (1996)
- 6 January – Gargoyles (1994–1997)
- 11 January – The Twisted Tales of Felix the Cat (1995–1997)
- 17 January – Sabrina, the Teenage Witch (1996–2003)
- 20 January – Superman: The Animated Series (1996–2000)
- 21 January – Oakie Doke (1995–1996)
- 6 February – Suddenly Susan (1996–2000)
- 19 February – Matt's Million (1996)
- 22 February – Goof Troop (1992–1993)
- 27 February – Ace Ventura: Pet Detective (1995–2000)
- 7 April – Water Rats (1996–2001)
- 8 April – Road Rovers (1996–1997)
- 18 April – KaBlam! (1996–2000)
- 19 April – Marsupilami (1993)
- 1 May – Goosebumps (1995–1998)
- 19 May – Clueless (1996–1999)
- 2 June – Deep Fried Swamp (1997)
- 3 June – Fievel's American Tails (1992)
- 30 June – The Simpsons (1989–present)
- 9 August – Little Mouse on the Prairie (1996)
- 11 August – Iznogoud (1995)
- September – Later On 2 (1997–2000)
- 8 September – Rugrats (1991–2004)
- 8 September – Enid Blyton's Enchanted Lands (1997–1998)
- 9 September – Mr. Men and Little Miss (1995–1997)
- 9 September – Jumanji (1996–1999)
- 10 September – Kipper (1997–2000)
- 10 September – The Incredible Hulk (1996–1997)
- 10 September – The Prince of Atlantis (1997)
- 11 September – Cave Kids (1996)
- 17 September – Muzzy in Gondoland (1986)
- 17 September – The Angry Beavers (1997–2001)
- 19 September – Polka Dot Shorts (1993–2001)
- 20 September – The Swamp Shop (1997–1998)
- 21 September – Noah's Island (1997–1999)
- 21 September – The Lion King's Timon & Pumbaa (1995–1999)
- 21 September – Brand Spankin' New! Doug (1996–1999)
- 24 September – The Wayne Manifesto (1997–1998)
- 27 September – C Bear and Jamal (1996–1997)
- 18 October – Waynehead (1996–1997)
- 3 November – Mummies Alive! (1997)
- 15 November – Bruno the Kid (1996–1997)
- 20 November – Johnny Bravo (1997–2004)
- 24 November – A Scare at Bedtime (1997–2006)
- 1 December – Don't Feed the Gondolas (1997–2001)
- 17 December – Dexter's Laboratory on Network 2 (1996–2003)
- 24 December – Father Christmas and the Missing Reindeer (1997)
- 24 December – Spot's Magical Christmas (1995)
- 25 December – Elmo Saves Christmas (1996)
- 29 December – True Tilda (1997)
- Undated – Married... with Children (1987–1997)
- Undated – Relativity (1996-1997)

=== Teilifís na Gaeilge ===
- 8 February – Romuald the Reindeer (1996)
- 2 September – Arthur (1996–present)
- 4 September – Cybernet (1995–2008)
- 5 September – Simba: The King Lion (1996–1997)
- 4 December – The Little Lulu Show (1995–1999)

== Endings ==
=== RTÉ 1 ===
- 28 February – Southern Nights (1996-1997)

== Changes of network affiliation ==
Shows	Moved from	Moved to
Goof Troop	Network 2	RTÉ 1
Chip 'n Dale: Rescue Rangers	Network 2	RTÉ 1
Fievel's American Tails	Network 2	RTÉ 1
Deep Fried Swamp	Network 2	RTÉ 1
The Simpsons	Network 2	RTÉ 1
Dennis and Gnasher	Network 2	RTÉ 1
Mike and Angelo	RTÉ 1	Network 2
The Biz	Network 2	RTÉ 1
James Bond Jr.	Network 2	RTÉ 1
The Little Engine That Could	Network 2	Teilifís na Gaeilge
Mort and Phil	RTÉ 1	Network 2
X-Men	RTÉ 1	Network 2

== Ongoing television programmes ==
=== 1960s ===
- RTÉ News: Nine O'Clock (1961–present)
- RTÉ News: Six One (1962–present)
- The Late Late Show (1962–present)

=== 1970s ===
- The Late Late Toy Show (1975–present)
- RTÉ News on Two (1978–2014)
- The Sunday Game (1979–present)

=== 1980s ===
- Glenroe (1983–2001)
- Saturday Live (1986–1999)
- Questions and Answers (1986–2009)
- The Den (1986–2010)
- Know Your Sport (1987–1998)
- Kenny Live (1988–1999)
- Fair City (1989–present)
- RTÉ News: One O'Clock (1989–present)

=== 1990s ===
- Would You Believe (1990s–present)
- Winning Streak (1990–present)
- Challenging Times (1991–2001)
- Prime Time (1992–present)
- The Movie Show (1993–2001)
- No Disco (1993–2003)
- Echo Island (1994–1999)
- Nuacht RTÉ (1995–present)
- Fame and Fortune (1996–2006)
- Nuacht TG4 (1996–present)
- Ros na Rún (1996–present)

== Ending this year ==
- 26 March – Gerry Ryan Tonight (1995–1997)
- 25 May – Return of the Swamp Thing (1996–1997)
- 30 May – Live at 3 (1986–1997)
- 31 July – Blackboard Jungle (1991–1997)
- 1 August – Deep Fried Swamp (1997)
- 23 August – Kennedy (1997)
- 16 December – Upwardly Mobile (1995–1997)
- 20 December – Sports Stadium (1973–1997)

== See also ==
- 1997 in Ireland
