= PM Live =

- Starring: Thelma Mansfield; Marty Whelan; Ciana Campbell and Alf McCarthy
- Country of origin: Ireland
- Original language: English

Production
- Camera setup: Multi-camera

Original release
- Network: RTÉ One
- Release: 1997 – May 1999

Related
- Live at 3 (1986 – 1997); Open House (1999 – 2004)

PM Live is Irish broadcaster RTÉ's former live flagship daytime show, running from 1997 to 1999. Replacing the long running daytime chat show Live at 3, it also replaced RTÉ One's midday show 12 to 1, merging much of the content of both shows (including presenters) into a long three-hour show which was interrupted at 4pm by Emmerdale. The series started at 15:00 and finished at 17:30.

The show was presented by Marty Whelan, Thelma Mansfield, Mary Kennedy, and Ciana Campbell. When it launched, John Moore wrote in The Sun that PM Live was "the most ambitious and glittering daytime television project ever mounted by RTE".

Ciana Campbell also hosted a jobs show on prime-time Network 2 which was a "PM Live production". This was RTÉ's last in-house daytime production until the arrival of Today with Maura and Daithi. In 1999 the series was replaced by Open House, produced for RTÉ by Tyrone Productions.

The series will be on RTE Player Christmas 2021 to mark 60 Years of Television.

Preceded by Live at 3	Afternoon programming on Telefís Éireann	Succeeded by Open House
