= 1996 in Irish television =

The following is a list of events relating to television in Ireland from 1996.

== Events ==
- 18 May – Ireland wins the Eurovision Song Contest with The Voice, a song composed by Brendan Graham and performed by Eimear Quinn.
- 24 May – The RTÉ website, www.rte.ie, is launched.
- 24 May – RTÉ 1 premieres the BBC television drama Ballykissangel. Not only was the series British, but it was also Irish as it was set in the Republic of Ireland and filmed in Avoca and Enniskerry in County Wicklow as well as being produced-in house by BBC Northern Ireland.
- 12 September – For the first time ever, long running UK children's television series Thomas the Tank Engine & Friends begins airing in Ireland on Network 2.
- 21 September – The popular animated series Hey Arnold!, made for Nickelodeon, begins its very first premiere on Irish television on Network 2 as part of the Saturday morning children's block The Swamp. The broadcast took place a month before its broadcasting debut in its homeland. Network 2 will start off with only three episodes of the series before returning on 5 April 1997 with more episodes to come.
- 27 September – Bosco is broadcast for the final time.
- 30 September – The Morbegs, a television programme for preschoolers and the replacement programme for Bosco, premieres on Network 2 for the first time. It would become one of the most popular children's programmes on Irish television. Despite the show's ending in 1998, it continues to air until 2008.
- 31 October – The Irish language television service Teilifís na Gaeilge (TG4) goes on air for the first time.

== Debuts ==
=== RTÉ 1 ===
- 4 March – The Elephant Show (1984–1988)
- 24 May – Ballykissangel (1996–2001)
- 7 June– Fame and Fortune (1996–2006)
- 15 June – Good Grief Moncrieff! (1996)
- 8 September – Brendan O'Carroll's Hot Milk and Pepper (1996–1998)
- 27 December - Southern Nights (1996-1997)

=== Network 2 ===
- 6 January – The Little Mermaid (1992–1994)
- 6 January – Happy Ness: The Secret of the Loch (1995)
- 6 January – The Sylvester & Tweety Mysteries (1995–2002)
- 10 January – Almost Perfect (1995–1996)
- 11 January – The Tick (1994–1996)
- 16 January – Legend of the Hidden City (1996–1998)
- 21 February – Spellbinder (1995)
- 22 February – Action Man (1995–1996)
- 28 March – The Story Store (1996)
- 30 March – Street Sharks (1994–1997)
- 1 April – Little Bear (1995–2003)
- 6 April – The Silver Brumby (1996–1998)
- 8 April – Yogi the Easter Bear (1994)
- 11 April – Bonkers (1993–1994)
- 11 April – Mort and Phil (1994)
- 13 April – The Secret World of Alex Mack (1994–1998)
- 16 April – Pinky and the Brain (1995–1998)
- 18 April – Caroline in the City (1995–1999)
- 28 April – The Magical Adventures of Quasimodo (1996)
- 5 May – Detective Bogey (1994)
- 1 July – The Swamp Summer Salad (1996)
- 31 August – Oscar's Orchestra (1995–2000)
- 8 September – Bugs (1995–1999)
- 9 September – Wolves, Witches and Giants (1995–1999)
- 9 September – Hypernauts (1996)
- 9 September – The Fantastic Voyages of Sinbad the Sailor (1996–1998)
- 10 September – Bump in the Night (1994–1995)
- 12 September – Earthworm Jim (1995–1996)
- 12 September – Thomas the Tank Engine & Friends (1984–2021)
- 12 September – Wishbone (1995–1997)
- 13 September – The Babaloos (1995–1998)
- 13 September – The Genie from Down Under (1996–1998)
- 18 September – The Real Adventures of Jonny Quest (1996–1997)
- 21 September – Hey Arnold! (1996–2004)
- 21 September – Dennis and Gnasher (1996–1998)
- 27 September – The Magic Library (1988)
- 28 September – Return of the Swamp Thing (1996–1997)
- 30 September – The Morbegs (1996–2008)
- 1 October – Littlest Pet Shop (1995)
- 1 October – Monty the Dog who wears glasses (1995)
- 27 October – Sliders (1995–1999)
- 9 December – Madeline (1993–2001)
- 13 December – Samson Superslug (1994–1996)
- 24 December – Brambly Hedge (1996–2000)
- 25 December – Shining Time Station: 'Tis a Gift (1990)
- 25 December – The BFG (1989)
- 25 December – A Close Shave (1995)
- 25 December – Dot and Spot's Magical Christmas Adventure (1996)
- 27 December – The Willows in Winter (1996)
- 27 December – Nilus the Sandman (1996–1998)
- 27 December – The Demon Headmaster (1996–1998)
- Undated – Animated Hero Classics (1991–2004)
- Undated – Central Park West (1995-1996)
- Undated – Space: Above and Beyond (1995-1996)

=== Teilifís na Gaeilge ===
- 31 October – Nuacht (1996–present)
- 31 October – C.U. Burn (1996)
- 1 November – Cúlabúla (1996–1999)
- 3 November – Ros na Rún (1996–present)
- 7 November – Delfy and His Friends (1992)
- 24 December – Magic Adventures of Mumfie (1994)
- Undated – Geantraí (1996–present)

=== BBC 1 ===
- 12 February – BBC Newsline (1996–present)

== Changes of network affiliation ==
Shows	Moved from	Moved to
Enchanted Tales	RTÉ 1	Network 2
A Bunch of Munsch	Network 2	RTÉ 1
X-Men	Network 2	RTÉ 1
Rupert	Network 2	RTÉ 1
Bouli	Network 2	Teilifís na Gaeilge
Aladdin	Network 2	RTÉ 1
Cadillacs and Dinosaurs	Network 2	RTÉ 1
Mort and Phil	Network 2	RTÉ 1
Widget	RTÉ 1	Network 2
Teenage Mutant Hero Turtles	Network 2	RTÉ 1
Inspector Gadget	Network 2	Teilifís na Gaeilge
The Legends of Treasure Island	Network 2	RTÉ 1
The Real Story of...	Network 2	RTÉ 1
Thunderbirds	Network 2	RTÉ 1
Action Man	Network 2	RTÉ 1
Bonkers	Network 2	RTÉ 1
The Brady Bunch	RTÉ 1	Network 2
Dog City	Network 2	RTÉ 1
The Elephant Show	RTÉ 1	Network 2
Mirror, Mirror	Network 2	RTÉ 1
Mike and Angelo	Network 2	RTÉ 1

== Ongoing television programmes ==
=== 1960s ===
- RTÉ News: Nine O'Clock (1961–present)
- RTÉ News: Six One (1962–present)
- The Late Late Show (1962–present)

=== 1970s ===
- Sports Stadium (1973–1997)
- The Late Late Toy Show (1975–present)
- RTÉ News on Two (1978–2014)
- The Sunday Game (1979–present)

=== 1980s ===
- Glenroe (1983–2001)
- Live at 3 (1986–1997)
- Saturday Live (1986–1999)
- Questions and Answers (1986–2009)
- Dempsey's Den (1986–2010)
- Know Your Sport (1987–1998)
- Kenny Live (1988–1999)
- Fair City (1989–present)
- RTÉ News: One O'Clock (1989–present)

=== 1990s ===
- Would You Believe (1990s–present)
- Winning Streak (1990–present)
- Blackboard Jungle (1991–1997)
- Challenging Times (1991–2001)
- Prime Time (1992–present)
- The Movie Show (1993–2001)
- No Disco (1993–2003)
- Echo Island (1994–1999)
- Upwardly Mobile (1995–1997)
- Nuacht RTÉ (1995–present)

== Ending this year ==
- 3 April – Marketplace (1987–1996)
- 7 April – Where in the World? (1987–1996)
- 24 August – Good Grief Moncrieff! (1996)
- 30 August – The Swamp Summer Salad (1996)
- Undated – Mailbag (1982–1996)

== See also ==
- 1996 in Ireland
