= Ian O'Doherty =

Irish journalist (born 1971)

- Born: 1971 (age 54–55); Coombe Women & Infants University Hospital, Dublin, Ireland
- Occupations: Columnist, writer, speaker
- Television: The Late Late Show, Seoige, The Frontline; Now It's Personal; Today with Maura and Daithi
- Spouse: Married
- Children: None

Ian O'Doherty (born November 1971) is an opinion columnist. He works for the Irish Independent, where the Press Ombudsman (Note: From 2007 to 2014, this position was held by John Horgan (Professor of Journalism at Dublin City University, former journalist and former Labour Party politician), from 2014 to 2022 by Peter Feeney (academic and former executive at RTÉ, Ireland's largest TV broadcaster) and since 2022 by Susan McKay (writer, journalist and documentary director).) had upheld criticism of several of his articles. He previously worked for the Evening Herald and Hot Press.

== Early life ==
O'Doherty was born in Dublin, Ireland, at the Coombe Women & Infants University Hospital in November 1971. His parents were both in their teens and he was the first of his mother's progeny. His father, who had been living in London, opted to stay with his mother in Ireland and to marry her. He became a communist but, after spending time in Romania, he ceased to be.

O'Doherty was an only child until the age of fifteen when his twin brother and sister were born. Though he is on good terms with them, he credits their arrival with causing him to come to the decision that he would never have children of his own.

O'Doherty's parents both died prematurely, an event he associates with the trauma they endured. His Nana (maternal grandmother), a devout Catholic, was another early influence on his life.

== Work ==
O'Doherty began working as a music reviewer during his teens. He has also reviewed books and was working on a response to the latest Salman Rushdie novel on 11 September 2001.

O'Doherty formerly worked for the Evening Herald and Hot Press. He currently works for the Irish Independent. His mid-week "iSpy" column consists of current affairs articles blended with shock-jock opinions. On Fridays he publishes the column "The World according to Ian O'Doherty". On Saturdays he has a column (formerly called "Agenda", now "Last call") on the back page of the Review supplement that comes with that day's edition. He began working full-time from home in about 2016. His columns in the Irish Independent have led to multiple letters of complaint and suggestions from readers.

=== Reception ===
In 2010, the editor of Gay Community News criticised a column written by O'Doherty which referred to gay people as "sexual deviants".

In a February 2011 column, he called for so-called "junkies" to be sterilised in the belief that it would be preferable if such people did not reproduce. He made a distinction between those drug users with addictions and those termed "junkies", expressing sympathy for anyone with a relative who had developed an addiction and writing: "An addict is someone who has developed a habit that they're trying to shake. A junkie, on the other hand, is the one who breaks into his own brother's house and steals stuff; a junkie is the one who will rob you blind and sell valuables that you have worked and saved for and then sell it for a tenner bag of smack". After criticism from an international organisation and two local campaign groups, which requested a formal apology and right of reply, the Irish Independent offered them their right of replay but they refused it. The Press Ombudsman criticised the article for breaching the rule against anything "intended or likely to cause... hatred against an individual or group". The country's Press Ombudsman had never previously declared drug users "to be an identifiable group, entitled to protections against prejudicial reporting in the media" and it also may never have previously occurred worldwide.

The Press Ombudsman upheld a complaint against O'Doherty in January 2014 for a column in which he described members of the Roma community as "a parasitic, ethnic underclass". The ombudsman said the article contained "a number of emphatic generalisations about beggars of Roma origin that, in his opinion, were clearly capable of or intended to cause grave offence".

In October 2015, the Press Ombudsman upheld a further complaint for a column in which he described the Palestinian Boycott, Divestment and Sanctions (BDS) movement as being "loud and shrill in their calls for a complete boycott of individual Israelis, regardless of their own political affiliation" and advocating "blanket boycotts of anything involving Jews." The Ombudsman stated that "the article was factually inaccurate in relation to the two statements" and that "BDS campaigns for a widespread boycott of Israeli institutions and organisations. It does not campaign for a boycott of all Israeli citizens. Neither does BDS campaign for a boycott of 'anything involving Jews'. Its campaign, though widespread in its targets, is limited to a boycott of Israeli State institutions as well as economic, cultural, sporting and academic organisations. It does not extend, as the author claimed, to 'anything involving Jews'."

In November 2015, when appearing on Newstalk he said that supporters of Liverpool Football Club "seem to go through so many commemorations of disasters and deaths that they should have just had a black armband just as part of their regulation kit". The presenter interrupted to point out that the club had gone through an "horrendous event", O'Doherty tried to justify his comments that as a Manchester United fan he "is not going to pass on the opportunity to have a go at them". A listener told the centre-left local newspaper Liverpool Echo that "As a Liverpool fan of over forty years I was angered by these comments about Liverpool's grieving of Hillsborough. I don’t think the journalist in question should simply be allowed to mock so openly the families of the 96, the club, its fans and the annual commemeration of the tragedy. The comments are nothing short of appalling."

== Politics ==
O'Doherty often writes about his political views or speaks about them on media platforms or at public events. He identifies as a libertarian. He has described Nick Griffin of the British National Party (BNP) as that party's "odious leader". He has criticised conspiracy theories, including those involving the September 11 attacks and COVID-19.

He supported the presence of US troops in the Middle East, equating opposition to this with "cowardice". However, during the 1980s, he attended countess demonstrations outside the U.S embassy in protest at the Central American death squads and the bombing of Tripoli and Benghazi. In 2021, he described his support for the 2003 invasion of Iraq as a "mistake… As far as I, and many other observers, were concerned, this was case of stopping a mad man [Saddam Hussein] from committing further genocide… As history has shown us, however, [the Americans] just made the situation a hell of a lot worse. Far from protecting the Marsh Arabs and the Kurds, they left them to be slaughtered". The 2011 military intervention in Libya he described as "calamitous" and "Hillary Clinton's review of the Libyan fiasco: 'We came. We saw. He died.'" as "obnoxious". O'Doherty also retains a distaste for the death penalty, particularly in cases where the target is mentally ill, and has criticised both Donald Trump and Bill Clinton for their support of capital punishment. He has described George W. Bush's so-called axis of evil as a "ludicrous" concept.

He voted in favour of the thirty-fourth Amendment of the Constitution of Ireland permitting same-sex marriage in the 2015 referendum, describing it as "a seminal day in Irish history… we should remember that, incredibly, homosexuality was actually crime in this country until 1993". He voted in favour due to "the explicit discrimination against a section of society which needed to be redressed". He supported the thirty-sixth Amendment of the Constitution of Ireland to Repeal the Eighth in the 2018 referendum on the basis that "none of us has the moral authority to tell a woman what to do with her body".

He criticised David Beckham following reports in February 2021 that the former footballer had signed a £10 million deal to become brand ambassador for the tiny Middle Eastern country of Qatar. O'Doherty said he had refused two similar offers to fly to Qatar at the start of 2020 (before the COVID-19 pandemic struck), citing the country's "appalling human rights records", particularly its persecution of gay people and treatment of women "like less than second-class citizens".

O'Doherty believes anti-discrimination laws should be removed. Commenting on Newstalk he said "the equality laws should be scrapped". During the COVID-19 pandemic, O'Doherty wrote a column disagreeing with and discouraging the boycott of Chinese businesses, and noted the hard work ethic present among Chinese people. He is a supporter of a person's right to protest.

In an interview on Newstalk with guest host Adrian Kennedy in January 2024, O'Doherty expressed his support of Israel's war on Gaza. He commented:

"I make no apologies or no bones, and nor should I. The fact that I love Israel and I love going over there. [...] Yeah, it’s called a war! If you kidnap people and if you slaughter citizens, you're going to get a war. […] Well what's disproportionate? Should they have gone in and picked out 1,200 Palestinians and just raped and killed them? Release the hostages and the war stops. This is something the Irish don't seem to get. Release the hostages and the war stops! But Hamas has to go. Have you noticed? Hamas is pretty much gone, Hezbollah is gone, [Bashar al-Assad] is gone. Release the hostages! Until then, no [— Israel should not stop]. And also, Hamas need to stop using kids as human shields. It's disgusting. All of this is on Hamas. All of this is on Hamas, not the IDF."

== Personal life ==
He is married, but has described himself as "utterly useless at being a bloke… spectacularly inept at performing all but the most basic functions". His wife is from County Mayo.

He lives in Dublin.

O'Doherty has spoken during at least one Atheist Ireland meeting. He expressed "genuine sympathy for the decent, honest Catholics" affected by the publication of the Mother and Baby Homes Commission of Investigation's final report. In around 2010 or 2011, he was approached to present an RTÉ documentary on Muslims. O'Doherty decided to work on the project despite opposition from his employer (the Irish Independent newspaper), as well as his wife, brother, sister and others he knew. The documentary, Now It's Personal, was aired in November 2011 and featured O'Doherty visiting a Dublin mosque. He described his motivation as being based on the wish "to meet the average Muslim Joe and thrash things out with him" and "to learn a bit about him" and stated that he left "with a better distinction between the ordinary Muslim and the ones who want to establish a world Caliphate".
