= Open House (Irish TV programme) =

- Genre: Talk show
- Created by: Tyrone Productions
- Presented by: Mary Kennedy, Marty Whelan, Sheana Keane
- Country of origin: Ireland
- Original language: English
- No. of episodes: 747

Original release
- Network: RTÉ One
- Release: 1999 – April 2004

Related
- PM Live (1997–1999); The Afternoon Show (2004–2010)

Open House is an afternoon television show broadcast on RTÉ One between 1999 and 2004. The last episode was broadcast in 2004. It was presented by Mary Kennedy and Marty Whelan and focused on lifestyle, cookery and human interest issues. Presenters included Dermot O'Neill, the popular gardening expert. The show was broadcast five days a week (Monday to Friday), and was also transmitted to the United Kingdom via Tara Television.

Open House replaced PM Live, and was itself replaced by The Afternoon Show.

It was popular with students and rapper Coolio laughed when two of the show's researchers replaced missing dancers.

== Axing ==
In March 2004, RTÉ announced it was axing Open House despite rising ratings for the programme. It had earlier had its time slot moved to 15:30. There were complaints on Liveline. Lord Mayor of Dublin Royston Brady described the decision as "bizarre". When news came that it was going to be axed, the programme's fans launched an unsuccessful campaign to save it. Among the signatories of a petition were Gay Byrne and Nicky Byrne from Westlife.

Director of Programmes TV at RTÉ, Clare Duignan, said Open House had been on RTÉ for nearly as long as its predecessor, Live at 3. However, It was preceded by PM Live, and Live at 3 at been on the air for 4 more years than Open House.

The last guest on Open House was Father Aiden Troy, before Jerry Fish & The Mudbug Club closed with a performance of "True Friends". Mary and Marty were guests of honour at the Mansion House, Dublin.

The series was made available on the RTE Player to mark 60 Years of Television in 2021.

Preceded by PM Live	Afternoon programming on Telefís Éireann	Succeeded by The Afternoon Show & Seoige
