= Alf McCarthy =

Irish radio presenter (1950–2024)

- Born: 1950; Ballinlough, Cork, Ireland
- Died: 17 April 2024 (aged 73); Wilton, Cork, Ireland
- Occupation: Broadcaster
- Years active: 1979–2015
- Employer: Raidió Teilifís Éireann (RTÉ)
- Notable work: Bull Island; Corkabout; Live at 3; PM Live; Late Date; Shortt Circuit

Alf McCarthy (1950 – 17 April 2024) was an Irish radio and television broadcaster who worked primarily with Raidió Teilifís Éireann (RTÉ).

== Early life ==
Born in Ballinlough in Cork in 1950, McCarthy was educated at Sullivan's Quay CBS and as a boarder at St Francis College in Rochestown. His father worked as a stonemason and had a yard on Copley Street in Cork. His father, known as Buddy Mac, was also a band leader and saxophonist in several showbands. McCarthy had a number of jobs after school, including factory worker, pizzeria manager, TV rental company worker, encyclopedia salesman and labourer with Irish Steel.

== Career ==
McCarthy was performing on stage and as a DJ when he began his broadcasting career with RTÉ Radio Cork in 1979. He spent 20 years presenting local current affairs and arts programme Corkabout. He created the comedy and satire series Shortt Circuit, The Usual Suspects and Bull Island, which was later adapted for television, as well as producing a number of documentaries. McCarthy's television credits included Live at 3, PM Live and Down Here with a View to Above. He retired from RTÉ in December 2015, by which stage he was presenting Late Date on RTÉ Radio One.

== Death ==
McCarthy died at Cork University Hospital on 17 April 2024, at the age of 73.
