= Four Live =

Four Live may refer to:

- Four Live (Irish TV programme), a 2010–2012 live Irish daytime programme that aired on RTÉ One
- Four Live (New Zealand TV programme), a 2012–2014 New Zealand weekday afternoon television programme that aired on Four
