= Síle Seoige =

Irish television presenter

- Born: 13 April 1979 (age 46); Castlebar, County Mayo, Ireland
- Occupation: Television presenter
- Employer: Raidió Teilifís Éireann (RTÉ)
- Height: 1.68 m (5 ft 6 in)
- Spouse: Glen Mulcahy (m. 2005; div. 2014) Damien O'Farrell (m. 2025)
- Children: 2
- Relatives: Gráinne Seoige (sister)

Síle Seoige (Irish pronunciation: [ˈʃiːlʲə ˈʃoːɟə]; born 13 April 1979) is an Irish television presenter. She has sometimes been referred to as Sheila.

== Early life ==
Seoige was born in Castlebar, County Mayothe youngest of four children, to parents Mairtín and Philomena. She attended Scoil Mhuire at primary level and Coláiste Chroí Mhuire at secondary level. After completing her Leaving Certificate, she was hired by TnaG to present a film show called Hollywood Anocht. Seoige was introduced to the public after Gráinne, her sister, departed for TV3. There she interviewed Hollywood talent like Bruce Willis and Meryl Streep. When Hollywood Anocht ended Síle became TG4's weather girl and continuity presenter, and after two years she moved on to host a children's programme called Cúla4.

After two years of Cúla4 Seoige took a year out and spent that time travelling. She returned to Ireland to try radio presenting. She worked for Beat 101–102, a station based in the south-east before moving to national station Today FM. In the summer of 2004 Seoige landed the job of covering Ireland's summer festivals for RTÉ's Nationwide.

== Bilingual hosting ==
Seoige presented RTÉ's Up for the Match and became a regular host on the bilingual programme Seachtain. She produced a four-part series for RTÉ called Coiscéim and appeared with The Devilins on a compilation CD SnaG-05 featuring bands from Ireland singing in Irish language.

In the summer of 2005, she took part in the first You're a Star series, in which she raised over forty thousand euro for Galway-based charity, Cope. The following month she co-presented season four of the series. She co-presented live coverage of the St. Patrick's Day Parade for three years. She then presented a bilingual English-Irish current affairs programme on RTÉ One called Pobal.

She has appeared as a guest presenter on travel programme No Frontiers and co-presented season one of RTÉ's entertainment series Class Act with Aidan Power. In 2007, she guest presented RTÉ's daytime programme The Afternoon Show with Bláthnaid Ní Chofaigh. She presented series five of TG4's flagship show Paisean Faisean with co-presenter Bláthnaid Ní Dhonnchadha. In October 2008, Seoige joined her older sister Gráinne as co-presenter of Seoige on RTÉ One. After only one season together, RTÉ subsequently dropped the show leaving both sisters "very shocked". In September 2009, she started as a co-presenter on RTÉ's The Afternoon Show.

She has worked for Newstalk radio, which signed her in an attempt to increase its appeal to listeners in the West of Ireland.

In 2023, Seoige began podcasting.

== Personal life ==
Seoige married Glen Mulcahy in 2005. By January 2009 they had separated. She was diagnosed with thyroid cancer in September 2011 and had a gland removed before being dosed with radioactive iodine.

On 29 April 2018, Seoige became engaged to long-term partner Damien O'Farrell, with whom she has a son and a daughter. She lives with her family in her native An Spidéal.
