= Seoige =

Irish television series (2006–2009)

- Created by: Robert Clare
- Developed by: Tyrone Productions
- Starring: Gráinne Seoige; Síle Seoige
- Country of origin: Ireland
- Original languages: English; Irish

Production
- Camera setup: Multi-camera
- Running time: 40 minutes per edition

Original release
- Network: RTÉ One
- Release: 9 October 2006 – 24 April 2009

Seoige is an Irish television chat show. It was hosted by sisters Gráinne and Síle Seoige and was broadcast live on weekdays at 4.30 pm on RTÉ One between 2006 and 2009, with a hiatus in the summer months. Episodes were repeated at 8.20 the following weekday morning on the same channel.

The programme was originally launched in 2006 as Seoige and O'Shea presented by Gráinne Seoige and Joe O'Shea. It followed a similar format to ITV's This Morning programme. Moving between serious issues and lighter subjects, content included interviews, debates and musical performances. Viewers could call, text, or e-mail the programme to give their opinions on topics. The presenters chatted with four sets of guests, which consisted of interviewees, discussion groups, and musical artists.

The show was rebranded Seoige in August 2008 after Joe O'Shea announced he was leaving RTÉ to pursue a career in radio broadcasting. RTÉ announced on 21 April 2009 that the show would be cancelled and that the last show would air on Friday, 24 April 2009. A new series was not commissioned for the autumn of 2009.

== Episodes ==
=== First series ===
The first series began on 9 October 2006 and ran until 20 April 2007. In the series, Seoige and O'Shea ran a short story and photography competition. The top 14 writers were published in a book entitled Do The Write Thing.

The winner, Ellen McCarthy, from Waterford was signed by Poolbeg publishers and her debut novel, Guarding Maggie was released on 2 May 2008. Following positive reaction to the book, McCarthy's second novel, Guilt Ridden was released in January 2009.

=== Second series ===
The second series began on 1 October 2007 and ran until 18 April 2008. In this series, the programme included a new look and added a live studio audience. There were also a number of new features. Relative Values looked at the family life of some of the nation's stars, Home Values toured the homes of some of Ireland's celebrities, and Money Matters offered solutions to money worries. There was also a regular travel segment and a weekly feature concerning psychics. There was a daily feature – Talking Point – where social issues were discussed. Following the success of the Do The Write Thing competition, Seoige and O'Shea began to host their own book club. On Wednesday, a well-known personality introduced a favourite book and was joined by a book club to review the week's chosen books. On Friday, there were musical performances and a segment where a panel of previewers informed viewers about the entertainment, music, and sport events taking place around the country at the weekend.

=== Third series ===
The third series began in October 2008 and saw Síle Seoige replace Joe O'Shea as co-presenter.

== Guests ==
Guests on the first two series of the show included:

- David Norris, senator
- Cecelia Ahern, author
- Louis Walsh, music manager
- Mickey Joe Harte, singer
- Bosco, children's television presenter
- Gordon Ramsay, chef
- John Waters, journalist
- Mary O'Rourke, Teachta Dála (TD)
- Mary Harney, TD
- Moya Brennan, singer
- Eddie Hobbs, financial advisor
- Katy French, model
- The Wolfe Tones, Irish band
- Keith Duffy, television personality
- Joe Duffy, radio personality
- Brian Ormond, presenter
- Aidan Power, presenter
- David Mitchell, actor
- Gerry Ryan, radio personality
- Ryan Tubridy, presenter
- Derek Davis, television personality
- Pat Shortt, comedian
- Éamon Dunphy, broadcaster
- Mary McEvoy, actress
- Patrick Clarke, writer, producer
- Eric Mabius, actor
- Victoria Smurfit, actress

== Reception ==
Although Seoige and O'Shea claimed that the programme had proven successful, television ratings revealed that it failed to enter the top 20. It launched with 100,000 viewers on 9 October 2006. In April 2008, it attracted an average viewership of 20–21 percent of the available audience. October 2008 attracted average viewing figures of 112,000 for each episode. In January 2009, the programme gained an average viewership of 127,000. Critics believed that the show's time slot and topics were responsible for its low viewing figures.

=== Criticism ===
The programme's format was criticised in editorials in the Irish Independent and The Sunday Times.

John Meagher said that Seoige and O'Shea had no chemistry between them: "Where was the on-screen chemistry, the "telly marriage" that both had talked up so much in the days leading up to the start date?"

Seoige and O'Shea were perceived by John Boland as being unsuited to chat shows, his description of their presentation styles stating: "As they [Seoige and O'Shea] lurched awkwardly from trivial items to serious topics they were nervous and stilted – she as much as he – and nowhere did they convey the ease that would put the make viewer feel at home."

Pat Stacey of the Evening Herald wrote that the Seoige sisters had no chemistry between them.

Jade Goody's agent Max Clifford criticised the Seoige sisters for their "aggressive" interview concerning Goody.

Preceded by Open House	Afternoon programming on Telefís Éireann (alongside The Afternoon Show); 2006–2009	Succeeded by Four Live; The Daily Show
