= The Afternoon Show =

2004 Irish daytime TV show

- Starring: Bláthnaid Ní Chofaigh (2004-2009); Anna Nolan (2004-2006); Sheana Keane (2006-2010); Trevor Keegan (until 2009); Síle Seoige (2009); Maura Derrane (2009-2010 )
- Country of origin: Ireland
- Original language: English/Irish

Production
- Camera setup: Multi-camera

Original release
- Network: RTÉ One
- Release: 4 April 2004 – May 2010

The Afternoon Show is Raidió Teilifís Éireann's former live flagship daytime show. It ran from 2004 until May 2010. The programme was dropped by RTÉ as part of its new season of television in 2010 along with its sisters show Seoige, to be replaced by Four Live presented by Maura Derrane and The Daily Show hosted by Dáithí Ó Sé and Claire Byrne.

The television show, the last season of which was presented by Sheana Keane and Maura Derrane, was a mix of lifestyle, information and fun items. The show included cookery, fashion, health, fitness, parenting, life-coaching and celebrity gossip. Viewers also had the opportunity to text, phone and e-mail in interjections, views, experiences and opinions, and they were given a chance to win prizes in a daily quiz.

The Afternoon Show had met with a mixed reaction since it first appeared on screens in 2004, presented by Bláthnaid Ní Chofaigh and Anna Nolan. This was partly because it replaced the hugely popular show Open House. There was speculation that the show has not proved as successful as its predecessor and that it would not return for a second season. However, a second series began in 2005, although one of the former presenters, Sheana Keane, did not return.

In 2006, the show returned for a third season. This time Anna Nolan left the show and was replaced by Sheana Keane, who returned after taking a year off to focus on her first child.

There was speculation that the show was possibly going to end. When the last series ended, Bláthnaid Ní Chofaigh said the programme would continue in 2009. It was confirmed though, in August 2009 that the programme would return "later and longer". The programme returned on 7 September 2009 beginning at 16:00 until 17:45.

Síle Seoige was to temporarily replace Bláthnaid Ní Chofaigh in September 2009. Later in the month, Ní Chofaigh revealed she would not be returning to the programme.

All series aired on RTÉ Player to celebrate 60 Years Of Television in 2021.

== Presenters ==
=== Bláthnaid Ní Chofaigh ===
Bláthnaid Ní Chofaigh presented the show from the launch in 2004. She presented the show five times a week taking various breaks throughout the season. In January 2009, she became a judge to the East on The All Ireland Talent Show but she continued to present The Afternoon Show. During May 2009, she was taken ill during rehearsals. This was not the first time she was unwell during the show as in 2008 she took a month off to recover from an operation. She has recently [when?] been involved in much media attention with her co-host Sheana Keane, leading to speculation that they were not on good terms. As a result of health issues, she left the programme in 2009.

=== Sheana Keane ===
Sheana Keane began presenting the show since the launch. After the first season, Sheana did not return for the second as she wanted to concentrate on her family. Sheana though did return for the third season from 2006-07 when Anna Nolan left the show. On her return Sheana presented the show from Monday to Thursday while Trevor Keegan steps in on Fridays with Bláthnaid. Sheana has taken many breaks throughout the four seasons she has presented but the most notable has been in March 2009 when she took a break for personal reasons, saying she was suffering from 'vertigo' and has not returned for the rest of the season. It has been announced that Sheana will return to the show presenting the sixth season from 2009–10.

=== Anna Nolan ===
Anna Nolan began presenting the show since the launch of 2004 with Sheana and Bláthnaid. From the beginning the media wrote about a frostiness between the presenters. Anna returned to present the second season with Bláthnaid and left the show after that to pursue other projects.

=== Trevor Keegan ===
Trevor Keegan had been with The Afternoon Show since the launch as the showbiz correspondent and filled in presenting throughout the first season and second season. When Sheana returned for the third season 2006-07 Trevor began presenting every Friday with Blathnaid as well as featuring during the rest of the week with showbiz gossip but since the fifth season 2008-09 as just presented every Friday only. In March 2009, when Sheana left for personal reasons, he has presented the show from Monday-Friday.

Trevor Keegan had been a presenter for a number of years on radio before the Afternoon Show as a breakfast presenter for Ireland's first ever regional station, Beat 102103 and before that, as a weekend breakfast presenter on Dublin's Country.

Trevor's first media job was as a presenter on RTÉ Radio 1 and RTÉ 2FM on AA Roadwatch traffic news. He was a regular contributor to The Gerry Ryan Show on 2FM over a number of years and also became a contributor to Ryan Tubridy's 'The Full Irish'.

During his stint on The Afternoon Show he was also working as a researcher and celebrity booker on The Podge and Rodge Show. He went on, after the daytime show, to be a Celebrity Producer on Wagons Den and The Big Fat Breakfast Show on RTÉ 2.

Trevor was an AP on Reality Bites 'From Boom To Maternity' and then series producer of the reality show, Six In The City. He was responsible for casting the series as well. After that he continued work with Waka TV for RTÉ as producer of the highest rated programme in the Reality Bites series, Vogue Does Home and Away, in which Vogue McFadden looked at the unprecedented success of the series in Ireland over the last 25 years.

Trevor had been a producer on another RTÉ 2 pilot programme, Away With A Stranger. He was also a continuity presenter for the live links on RTÉ 1 and 2.

Trevor made his TV presenting return to RTÉ after five years behind the camera as a regular News Review Presenter on Morning Edition.

=== Pamela Flood and Kathryn Thomas ===
Various presenters filled in for the main presenters if they were away or ill those being Síle Seoige, Gráinne Seoige, Kathryn Thomas and Caroline Morahan but Pamela Flood had filled in throughout the past five seasons for various reasons.

=== Síle Seoige ===
In August 2009, RTÉ confirmed that Síle Seoige would be presenting the beginning of the sixth season of the Afternoon Show originally it was believed that Síle would be presenting the show with Bláthnaid Ní Chofaigh, but in September it was revealed that Síle would be presenting the show with presenter Sheana Keane who has not been on-screen since March 2009. RTÉ have insisted that Síle will only be filling in for Bláthnaid Ní Chofaigh only for a couple of weeks as Bláthnaid recovered from a minor operation. Sile presented the show for four weeks with Sheana Keane and departed with Maura Derrane taking over the role which became permanent after a positive reaction to her performance on the show.

=== Maura Derrane ===
Maura Derrane presented her first show on 5 October 2009 after Sile, who presented the show with Sheana for the month of September, had finished her 4 weeks with the show. Maura became a permanent host with Sheana from Christmas onwards until the show was axed that May.

=== Dr Mark Hamilton ===
From 2009 Dr Mark Hamilton presented Friday's show with rotation between Sheana and Maura. He is from Dublin.

Preceded by Open House	Afternoon programming on Telefís Éireann; 2004 - 2010	Succeeded by Four Live; The Daily Show
