= Dermot O'Neill (gardener) =

Irish gardener (1964–2022)

Dermot O'Neill (9 March 1964 – 1 July 2022) was an Irish gardener and editor of Garden Heaven magazine. He appeared on several radio and television programmes for RTÉ and BBC Northern Ireland and contributed regular columns for Irish newspapers and magazines including the RTÉ Guide, The Irish Times, and the Sunday Independent.

== Career ==
O'Neill worked at the Marlfield Garden Centre in Cabinteely, County Dublin before moving to the University College Dublin horticultural unit. In 1982, he began to appear on RTÉ children's programmes, before presenting a gardening segment on Live at Three. He appeared on The Garden Show, and presented on gardening within the magazine show Open House, and on Today With Pat Kenny. He was a regular horticultural contributor to the Mooney show with Derek Mooney on RTÉ Radio 1.

O'Neill was a guest on The Restaurant and the travel show Time On Their Hands. In 2007, he launched Garden Show Ireland at the walled garden at Hillsborough Castle.

In 2008, O'Neill appeared on the St. Patrick's Day episode of The Oprah Winfrey Show.

== Societies ==
O'Neill served on the council of the Royal Horticultural Society of Ireland and was a founding committee member of the Irish Garden Plant Society. In 2016, Mount Congreve House Gardens announced that a new variety of the Magnolia plant, one of O'Neill's favourite flowers, would be named Magnolia campbellii 'Dermot O'Neill' in his honour.

== Personal life and death ==
O'Neill grew up in Blackrock, Dublin and was educated at Christian Brothers College, Monkstown Park.

During the summer of 2009, O'Neill was diagnosed with cancer. Initially thought to be a recurrence of a previous stomach ulcer, O'Neill was later diagnosed with stomach cancer and non-Hodgkin lymphoma. He was treated at Beacon Hospital, Beaumont Hospital, and St. Vincent's Private Hospital. O'Neill spent almost six months at St. Vincent's and underwent chemotherapy under the care of John Crown. He was declared cancer-free in 2011.

After his recovery, he completed an RTÉ TV series, Dermot's Secret Garden, about his health problems and renovations of his Victorian walled garden in Clondeglass, County Laois.

O'Neill died on 1 July 2022, aged 58, at St Vincent's Private Hospital in Dublin. He was survived by two sisters, Carol and Louise, and extended family.

== Publications ==
- Roses Revealed (Kyle Cathie) 1 April 2007 ISBN 1-85626-654-0
- Discover Gardening (Poolbeg Publishing) 29 October 2004 ISBN 1-84223-184-7
- Dermot Gardens (Poolbeg Publishing) January 2003 ISBN 1-84223-065-4
- Gardening tips (TownHouse & CountryHouse) 19 October 2002 ISBN 1-86059-166-3
- Creative Gardening with Dermot O'Neill (Gill & Macmillan Ltd) November 1990 ISBN 0-7171-1813-4
