= Michael Ryan (broadcaster) =

Irish television broadcaster (born 1944)

- Born: 1944 (age 81–82); Ireland
- Occupation: Television presenter
- Years active: 1966–2011
- Known for: Host of Nationwide
- Children: 3

Michael Ryan (born 1944) (Irish: Mícheál Ó Riain) is a former television broadcaster on RTÉ. He used to present the series Nationwide, which is broadcast on RTÉ One every Monday, Wednesday, and Friday evening. Mary Kennedy joined him as co-presenter in later years.

He lived in Marino, Dublin, as a child. He has two sons, Dylan and Colin Ryan, and a daughter, Lisa. His first wife and the mother of his children, Anne Christine Ryan (née Kearney), died in a car accident in 1995 while travelling home from Waterford, where she ran a successful PR company. Ryan married his second wife, Liz, in 2010. He is considered "popular" in Ireland. He has been based in Wexford for more than 30 years.

Ryan retired from his career at RTÉ in 2011.
