= Kennedy (talk show) =

Irish TV series

- Genre: Light entertainment
- Directed by: Úna Pierce
- Presented by: Mary Kennedy
- Country of origin: Ireland
- Original language: English
- No. of series: 1
- No. of episodes: 11

Production
- Producer: John Williams
- Production locations: Studio 4, RTÉ Television Centre, Donnybrook, Dublin 4
- Camera setup: Multi-camera
- Running time: 70 minutes

Original release
- Network: RTÉ One
- Release: 14 June – 23 August 1997

Kennedy is a talk show hosted by Mary Kennedy. The show aired live on Saturday nights as a summer "filler" between 14 June and 23 August 1997.

Preceded by Good Grief Moncrieff!	Saturday night summer programming on Telefís Éireann; 1997	Succeeded by Saturday Night with Miriam?
