= Anne Cassin =

Irish sports broadcaster

- Born: 6 April 1962 (age 64); Balbriggan, Dublin, Ireland
- Occupation: Nationwide presenter
- Employer: RTÉ
- Spouse: Donagh McGrath
- Children: 2

Anne Cassin (born 6 April 1962) is an Irish journalist and presenter working for RTÉ, where she has presented Nationwide since 2012.

== Career ==
Cassin began her broadcasting career working for Dublin pirate radio station Radio Nova in 1982, where she co-presented a nightly news programme, Dublin Today, with Bryan Dobson, later a fellow newscaster on RTÉ. In 1993, she presented Eurofocus, a RTÉ series on studies of education in European countries. She began presenting radio and television news bulletins for RTÉ in 1995 and has also covered current affairs, politics and sport as a reporter and on The Sunday Game circa (1991-1995).

Cassin has also presented various non-news programmes including the weekly Dublin-based feature series Capital D, Crimecall and The All Island School Choir Competition. On 20 December 2011, she was named as the new co-presenter of Nationwide, replacing Michael Ryan. Her first Nationwide broadcast occurred on 13 January 2012.

== Personal life ==
Cassin is the eldest daughter of actor and director Barry Cassin, and Nancy. She was educated at Loreto Convent, Balbriggan, County Dublin. Cassin has two children with her partner and RTÉ colleague Donagh McGrath.
