= Nationwide (Irish TV programme) =

RTÉ news documentary series, Ireland

- Genre: Factual, regional news
- Presented by: Michael Ryan (1993 – 2011); Mary Kennedy (2004 – 2019); Anne Cassin (2011 – present); Bláthnaid Ní Chofaigh (2020 – present)
- Theme music composer: Brian Byrne
- Opening theme: Nationwide Theme
- Ending theme: Nationwide Theme
- Country of origin: Ireland
- Original languages: English, Irish

Production
- Production location: Various
- Editor: Eoin Ryan
- Camera setup: Single-camera
- Running time: 30 minutes
- Production company: RTÉ

Original release
- Network: RTÉ One
- Release: 24 October 1993 – present

Nationwide is a television programme shown in Ireland each Monday, Wednesday and Friday evening at 19:00. Produced by RTÉ Cork, and broadcast on RTÉ One for around 30 minutes, it is presented by Anne Cassin and Bláthnaid Ní Chofaigh, after long-serving presenter Mary Kennedy reached RTÉ's retirement age in 2019. Nationwide focuses on human interest stories and cultural events across the country.

== Format ==
Nationwide is presented in the form of, most often, two on-site recordings, with one advertising break between them. It has aimed to regionalise news and human interest content, as RTÉ has worked to do previously, albeit without the increased technology and transmission costs, which would likely require total re-engineering of the country's transmission and cable television networks. Nationwide itself was the sole programme regionalised in recent times, but this has now ceased.

== History ==
Nationwide began broadcasting in 1993. It was conceived by Michael Ryan, who presented for many years until he retired from RTÉ in 2011. On occasion he was replaced by news reporter/presenter Flor MacCarthy.

In its early years, Nationwide broadcasts largely comprised regional stories from RTÉ's local news correspondents. The series was presented from a studio from 1993 until 2000 when the series began to tour towns and cities around the country. The original series studio came from the city of Waterford, as Micheal Ryan was RTÉ Regional correspondent in the 1990s. The series then moved to Cork and became an RTÉ Cork production.

During its original run it was broadcast every second Sunday, pre-record in a room rented by Micheal Ryan from a Photographer in Waterford City, later it would move to RTÉ's Cork Studios. By the end of the 1990s the series was being broadcast three nights a week – Monday, Wednesday and Friday – at 19:00 and the presentation of the show took place in local towns and cities across the country.

Cartoonist Terry Willers had a regional paper slot every Friday up until the end of the 1990s.

Ryan was joined in 2004 by Mary Kennedy as a co-presenter. Ryan retired from Nationwide in 2011, with the announcement that Anne Cassin would replace him as co-presenter after the ending of her current role as presenter of a Dublin-based magazine series called Capital D.

As part of its 20th anniversary, RTÉ commissioned Brian Byrne to compose a new theme for Nationwide. The music was recorded by the RTÉ Concert Orchestra. New opening credits were created by Noho's Niall Ó hOisin and Niall Campion with footage filmed by RTÉ Cameraman Paul Deighan.

Blathnáid Ní Chofaigh joined as a presenter in 2020, after Mary Kennedy's retirement from RTÉ.

== Correspondents ==
Helen McInerney, Niall Martin, Mary Fanning, Mary Harte, Helen Mark, Valarie Waters, Marian Malone, Zainab Boladale and John Kilraine.
