= The Daily Show (Irish TV series) =

- Presented by: Dáithí Ó Sé; Claire Byrne
- Country of origin: Ireland
- Original language: English
- No. of series: 1

Production
- Production locations: RTÉ Television Centre, Donnybrook, Dublin 4
- Camera setup: Multi-camera
- Running time: 50 minutes

Original release
- Network: RTÉ One
- Release: 20 September 2010 – 2 March 2012

Related
- Four Live

The Daily Show is a lifestyle magazine show which aired on the RTÉ One television channel in Ireland, and which debuted as part of RTÉ's autumn/winter season 2010. It followed Four Live, presented by Maura Derrane.

Presented by Dáithí Ó Sé and Claire Byrne, The Daily Show began on Monday 20 September 2010. It ended on 2 March 2012 due to budget cutbacks at RTÉ.

== Presenters ==
=== Dáithí Ó Sé ===
Dáithí is a native Irish speaker and began his TV career on TG4 as a weather man and as one of their continuity announcers. He also hosted the documentary series Dáithí ar Route 66 and Dáithí ar Route 61 for TG4. In August 2010 he became the host of the annual Rose of Tralee festival.

=== Claire Byrne ===
Claire Byrne started her broadcasting career on local radio before moving to TV3 as an Ireland AM newsreader. In the mid-2000s she became a newsreader on the United Kingdom's FIVE; she later moved back to TV3 as co-host of Ireland AM. She left TV3 in 2008 and returned to radio with Newstalk. TV3 insisted at this time that she finish her contract with them before moving to the news radio station.

== Format ==
The series was a current affairs and lifestyle based news show. Guests include sports stars, actors, TV hosts, and politicians. Segments include Showbiz with Lottie Ryan, Movies with Micheal Doherty, and Technology.

=== RTÉ News ===
An RTÉ News bulletin aired at 5pm during the show.

=== Three Little Words ===
The main guest of the day was asked to increase the Friday Cash Giveaway. Dáithí gives 3 clues as to what the three words are and if the guest gets all three words correct they add €500 to the cash prize. The guest had a minute to guess the 3 words.

== History ==
On 28 January 2011, Kara Tointon appeared on The Daily Show after winning a British television show.

On 3 February 2011, Jedward appeared on The Daily Show.

On 14 April 2011, Hart to Hart actor Stefanie Powers appeared on The Daily Show. Dáithí confessed that he fancied her.

On 20 January 2012, former EastEnders actor Pam St. Clement appeared on The Daily Show.

Will be available on RTE Player during Christmas 2021 to celebrate 60 Years of Television.

== Criticism ==
Based on the first episode of the show, Pat Stacey of the Evening Herald asserted that Ó Sé and Byrne have no chemistry between them.

The Irish Times TV review said it is "a panel show, and the idea – I think – is to be more heavyweight than Derrane and discuss the social and political events of the day, or, as they said, what people are talking about. Except there's also a pointless phone-in poll, a mortifyingly stupid quiz, consumer items and other random bits and bobs" and that it had missed a huge opportunity when Michael Kennedy TD of the Fianna Fáil political party stated he was in support of Tom Kitt's suggestion that the Taoiseach's leadership of the party needed to be discussed by the party, a major coup for the new show hampered by a "confused" and "lightweight" format. The set was also described as "old fashioned" and "clunky".

Preceded by The Afternoon Show	Afternoon programming on Telefís Éireann (alongside Four Live); 2010 – 2012	Succeeded by Today
