= RTÉ One =

Irish television channel

- Logo used since 2014
- Country: Ireland
- Broadcast area: Ireland; Northern Ireland
- Headquarters: Donnybrook, Dublin

Programming
- Languages: English; Irish; Irish Sign Language
- Picture format: 1080i 16:9 (HDTV) (2013– ) 576i 16:9 (SDTV) (2005–2024); 576i 4:3 (SDTV) (1961–2005)
- Timeshift service: RTÉ One +1

Ownership
- Owner: Raidió Teilifís Éireann
- Sister channels: RTÉjr; RTÉ2; RTÉ News; RTÉ Kids

History
- Launched: 31 December 1961
- Former names: Telefís Éireann (1961–1966); RTÉ TV (1966–1978); RTÉ 1 (1978–1995)

Links
- Website: www.rte.ie/tv/rteone.html

Availability

Terrestrial
- Saorview: Channel 1 (HD); Channel 11 (+1)
- Freeview (Northern Ireland only): Channel 54

Streaming media
- Virgin TV Anywhere: Watch live (Ireland only)
- RTÉ Player: Watch live (Available depending on rights)
- Sky Go: Watch Live (Ireland only)

RTÉ One is an Irish free-to-air flagship television service owned and operated by Raidió Teilifís Éireann (RTÉ). It is the most-popular and most-watched television channel in the country and was launched as Telefís Éireann on 31 December 1961, it was renamed RTÉ in 1966, and it was renamed as RTÉ 1 upon the launch of RTÉ2 in 1978. It is funded partly by the government's licence fee; the remainder of the funding is provided by commercial advertising. Because RTÉ is funded partly by the licence fee it shows considerably fewer advertisements than most other channels available in Ireland and Northern Ireland.

RTÉ One is available to 98% of the Irish population in HD on the Saorview DTT service. It is also available in Northern Ireland via Saorview, Freeview, Sky, and cable provider Virgin Media. The channel is also available online through RTÉ Player.

== History ==
RTÉ One began life as Telefís Éireann in 1961. It was the second indigenous television channel in the island of Ireland and third overall, the first was BBC TV Service NI (now BBC One Northern Ireland) in 1955 and Ulster Television (UTV) in 1959, both in Northern Ireland in the United Kingdom.

Originally Telefís Éireann broadcast in black and white throughout the country using the European 625-line standard, as well as on the 405-line television system in the northern and eastern parts of the country; since the mid-50s, many people in these areas already had 405-line TV sets receiving BBC and UTV/HTV transmissions from Northern Ireland/Wales respectively. A standards conversion unit was used to provide the 405-line service, but when this electronic device failed, optical conversion was used, reportedly by directing a 405-line camera at a 625-line monitor.

The first programme to be pre-recorded for the new television service was The School Around the Corner, an interview/quiz show created and presented by Paddy Crosbie and produced by James Plunkett.

Telefís Éireann was renamed as RTÉ TV in 1966, upon the renaming of the Radio Éireann Authority as Radio Telefís Éireann, and became RTÉ 1 upon the launch of RTÉ 2 in 1978.

PAL colour transmissions began in 1968, and the first programme made and transmitted in colour was "John Hume's Derry." The first outside broadcast in colour for RTÉ Television was the 1971 Railway Cup Finals (Gaelic Athletic Association), and soon after that, the Eurovision Song Contest 1971 from Dublin. In the 1970s, the studios in RTÉ's Television Centre started being equipped for colour, the first was the news studio in 1974, studio 2 in 1975, and finally studio 1 (the largest studio, used for productions such as The Late Late Show) in 1976.

Unlike Northern Ireland which had a duopoly of BBC and ITV, RTÉ was the only television channel in the Republic of Ireland until 1978 when RTÉ 2 (known as Network 2 between 1988 and 2004) was created and started full colour broadcasting at the same time. The Irish language station TG4 began in 1996 as Teilifís na Gaeilge (TnaG). Since 1998 RTÉ One also competes with Virgin Media One (formerly known as "TV3").

Since it began broadcasting, RTÉ One has competed with BBC One and UTV from Northern Ireland, and in the 1980s RTÉ began competing with other satellite and cable channels that are widely available across Ireland through cable subscription services due to the high take up of cable TV from pan-European and UK channels since the 1960s, and the continued roll out of MMDS and satellite during the 1980s and 1990s.

From 1961, RTÉ Television would only broadcast from 17:35 until around 23:30 during the Winter months. In 1975 this changed slightly with transmission starting at around 15:30 and concluding around midnight (00:00). 24-hour broadcasts began in the late 1990s. In 1988, RTÉ One launched a schedule with a new news bulletin at 13:00. Currently, RTÉ One does not offer "breakfast television", but from 2013 to 2014 the station aired an early morning current affairs show called Morning Edition, which was also simulcast on RTÉ News Now. Virgin Media One is currently the only indigenous broadcaster in direct competition for this early morning market with Ireland AM since 1999. RTÉ One during the Olympics and special breaking news or election coverage, will provide a special bulletin in the mornings. RTE 1 and N2 had separate Weather forecasts (November 1997 – January 13, 2002). On Monday January 14, RTE 1 and N2 weather forecasts were remerged.

On 6 July 2017, RTÉ One extended its on-air hours, starting at 6:00 am as opposed to the later 6:20 am as previously.

== RTÉ One HD ==
RTÉ One HD was launched on 21 October 2013 — originally in upscaled HD — following the launch of a new Saorview multiplex. Native HD broadcasts began on 16 December 2013.

Since 2024, RTÉ One is now broadcast solely in High Definition (HD) on all platforms, with the Standard Definition simulcast ending on 2 April 2014 on the national DTT service Saorview, and on 29 April 2024 on Sky.

RTÉ Television decided to launch the new HD service just before the Christmas period to draw audiences attention to the new service available to viewers. RTÉ have started to convert their main production studios to HD, the first being studio 5 in 2012, which is used mainly for sports productions. Any programmes still made in standard-definition are upscaled on the channel and it is intended that the vast majority of the channel's output will be in high-definition in due course. RTÉ One in SD continues to be available on Virgin Media Ireland until more of their customers have upgraded to HD.

Sky Ireland launched the channel on 14 December 2015, as part of a new long-term partnership with RTÉ, however the channel is not available on Sky UK's Northern Ireland EPG. In response to queries, RTÉ currently advises Northern Ireland Sky subscribers to contact Sky on the matter whereas Sky replies that it's an issue for RTÉ as to whether they make their HD channel available. On 11 April 2024, the channel was finally made available in Northern Ireland. Later that month, the SDTV feed was discontinued on Sky altogether, as such, the channel effectively became HD exclusive.

== RTÉ One +1 ==
A timeshift channel for RTÉ One (RTÉ One +1) was launched on 27 May 2011 and shares channel space with RTÉjr. The channel was made available on Saorview from its launch, UPC Ireland replaced City Channel with RTÉ One +1 on 13 March 2012. Reeling in the Years does not broadcast on this channel due to music rights restrictions.

It was referred to as RTÉ One Deferred in the Easy TV commercial DTT multiplex application, Easy TV was made up of RTÉ NL and UPC Ireland. RTÉ had also plans to create a third channel called RTÉ Three along with RTÉ One Deferred as reported in the Sunday Business Post in May 2008.

RTÉ Three was dropped for the alternative RTÉ Plus/RTÉjr. RTÉ Plus would have initially been a time shift channel for RTÉ One's prime time schedule, starting each night at 19:00 after RTÉjr ends for the night. This "Phase 1" of RTÉ plus was to begin broadcasting in May 2011. "Phase 2" of RTÉ Plus was to be made up of an entirely different schedule to that of RTÉ One, RTÉ had hoped that this would be made available in May 2012. Minister Pat Carey gave the go ahead for RTÉ One +1 for a maximum of 4 years at which point it will be reviewed. He did not give permission for the second phase in the channel as he was advised by the BAI that it may cause problems for commercial service providers such as TV3.

As part of a new long-term partnership with Sky, RTÉ One +1 launched on Sky channel 115 on 14 December 2015, moving RTÉ2 HD down to 278. On 1 May 2018, the +1 channels and the Entertainment & Documentaries channel sections were moved to 201 - 299 to coincide with the non +1 channel. For example, RTÉ One is on channel 101, and RTÉ One +1 is on 201.

When launched, RTÉ One +1 broadcast from 19:00 to approximately 02:00. On 15 February 2019, RTÉ One +1 began broadcasting 24 hours a day to coincide with the launch of RTÉ2 +1.

== Programming ==
RTÉ One airs a variety of programmes each week, both homegrown programming and imported programming. A typical week of programming on RTÉ One would be as follows: On Sunday night RTÉ's flagship talent show The Voice of Ireland airs at 18.30, with the results show following soap opera Fair City at 20.30. Dragon's Den airs at 21.30 on Sunday nights. On Monday nights at 21.35, there is a questions and answers style show called Claire Byrne Live hosted by Claire Byrne. The long running chat show The Late Late Show hosted by Patrick Kielty airs Friday nights from 21.35, it is the longest running chat show in the world. On Saturday night, game show The Million Euro Challenge airs at around 20.15, The Saturday Night Show airs at around 21.45, similar to The Late Late Show it has a variety of celebrity guests and music performances. Irish soap opera Fair City airs four times a week on RTÉ One, it airs Sundays at 20:30, Tuesdays, and Thursdays at 20.00, and Wednesdays at 19.30, Fair City is similar to the British format for soap operas such as Coronation Street. RTÉ One also airs British soap opera EastEnders weekly at the same times as BBC One. RTÉ One also air a host of films throughout the week including the midweek movie on Wednesday at 21:30 and the big big movie (usually a children's film) Saturdays at 18:30. RTÉ One also air news coverage throughout the week including a 13:00, 18:00, and 21:00 news broadcast every day.

=== News and current affairs ===
RTÉ News and Current Affairs provides all of RTÉ One's news and current affairs programming.

RTÉ News and Current Affairs television programmes include:

News programming

- Morning Edition
- RTÉ News: One O'Clock
- RTÉ News: Six One
- RTÉ News: Nine O'Clock
- RTÉ News: Headlines (broadcast at regular intervals in the morning, early afternoon and at night)
- Nuacht RTÉ
- RTÉ News with Signing

Current Affairs Programming

- Prime Time
- Prime Time Investigates
- Claire Bryne Live
- The Week in Politics
- Nationwide
- One To One
- Oireachtas Report
- Euro Report

RTÉ News and Current Affairs coverage of all major political events such as General Elections, Budgets, Local and European Elections and Referendums. Since 2000 RTÉ has covered the US Presidential Elections live. It also covers major political stories from the Northern Irish Assembly, including elections.

=== Diversity ===
RTÉ as a public service broadcaster is committed to providing awareness about the diverse communities found within Ireland. RTÉ aims to providing access to different groups through different mediums.

RTÉ Diversity provides awareness of Ireland's multicultural society. From 2002, RTÉ produced a weekly multicultural show called Mono. The show aired between 2002 and 2005 and had a similar format as Nationwide; but focused more on multicultural issues and had reports from all parts of the country. The show was produced by Kairos Communications for RTÉ and was presented by Shalini Sinha.

RTÉ Diversity commissions a monthly show for individuals with hearing impairments or deafness. Hands On (originally called Sign of the Times) airs every Sunday morning. The show is presented using Irish Sign Language. The show is also subtitled using Irish or English subtitles. In 2009, the number of Hands On programmes were reduced by 60%, from 20 to 7.

Diversity has also been showcased on RTÉ Dramas: The Riordans and Glenroe featured several characters from the Irish Travelling Community. Fair City and The Clinic have showcased a broader range of diversity which includes members of the Roma community, LGBT movement, African heritage, Eastern Europe and other ethnic minorities groups in Ireland.

In April 2010, RTÉ revealed a new multicultural programme which will air from March 2011. The show has a budget of €45,000 per episode.

==== Cláracha Gaeilge ====
RTÉ produced the television series Buntús Cainte in 1967, which together with the corresponding series of books, aimed to promote the learning of the Irish Language. The television series was presented by Máire O'Neill and Aileen Geoghegan. In the early 1990s, they produced a similar show with BBC Northern Ireland called Now You're Talking which used the Ulster dialect of Irish. In they early 2000s, they produced a new series called Turas Teanga, which was presented by newsreader Sharon Ní Bheoláin.

During Seachtain na Gaeilge (Irish Language Week), continuity is provided through the Irish Language. During this week they also have a range of shows that promote the learning or use of the Irish language. In 2010 they produced An Cór with Fiachna O Braonáin.

RTÉ also produced the highly successful Irish Language documentary strands Leargás, Scannal and CSÍ, which were first shown on RTÉ One with repeats on TG4.

Nuacht RTÉ provides a round-up of the day's events at 17:40 each weekday.

RTÉ has a dedicated commissioning brief inviting proposals for new Irish-language programming.

==== Education ====
In the early years of Teilifís Éireann most of the educational shows were aimed at children such as Dáithí Lacha. In more recent years they have produced literacy programmes for adults such as Read, Write, Now presented by Derek Mooney.

=== Regional ===
Nationwide is RTÉ's main regional programme, in 2010 Gala began sponsoring the show. The shows average audience for 2009 was 400,000 viewers. The show began airing in the early 1990s. In 1999 RTÉ tested opt out for Dublin, Cork and Galway on UHF signals, however Chorus (a Dublin cable operator at the time) aired the Galway edition, while NTL (the other Dublin cable operator aired the Dublin version). RTÉ do not provide local opt-out or regional news. However RTÉ Cork produces a number of other Irish shows. Capital D was a programme for Dublin (similar in style to Nationwide), presented by Anne Cassin, it took a look at issues in Dublin. The programme did not return in 2012. Ear to the Ground is a farming magazine show. Nationwide is produced by RTÉ Factual while Ear to the Ground is produced by Independent Films for RTÉ.

=== Drama and comedy ===
==== 1960s ====
In 1961 as Teilifís Éireann got ready to begin broadcasting it appointed Hilton Edwards as head of Drama, he was heavily involved in Irish theatre at the time. At this early stage they produced many international and local plays for television audiences such as Antigone, The Wild Duck, The Fire Raisers, The Government Inspector, The Physicists, Martine, The Well of the Saints, Candida, The Man of Destiny, In the Shadow of the Glen, Church Street, The Field, The Plough and the Stars, The Shadow of a Gunman and The Hostage. Both of Edwards' successors Jim Fitzgerald and Chloe Gibson would continue with stage play adaptations but would also look for original dramas for television. Hugh Leonard adapted James Joyce's Dubliners under the title Dublin and in 1966 he wrote Insurrection, an 8-part real-time series which depicted the events of the 1916 Easter Rising which was broadcast on Easter Week on the 50th anniversary of the rising, it was RTÉ biggest drama production of the 1960s, involving on location filming and the Army. In its first ten years on the air RTÉ produced 103 plays of which 66% were Irish and 50% began life as stage plays. Half of the drama produced came from serials such as the Dublin based urban soap Tolka Row which began broadcasting in 1964 and finished in 1968. In terms of population RTÉ was one of Europe's biggest producers of television drama.

In 1965 The Riordans began broadcasting, this would begin the Wesley Burrowes trilogy of Irish Agrisoaps (Agricultural based dramas), it was followed by Bracken in 1978 (and was aired on RTÉ One) as Gabriel Byrne's character (Pat Barry) moved from Kilkenny to Wicklow and in 1982 two of Bracken's main characters Dinny and Milie Byrne moved to Glenroe which ran until 2001.

==== 1970s ====
In the 1970s RTÉ produced several urban dramas set outside Dublin. The Burke Enigma began in 1975 and was RTÉ's first police procedural something that they did not return to very often. Partners in Practice was RTÉ's first medical drama and was loosely based on successful TV formats from abroad such as Emergency Ward 10, Dr. Finlay's Casebook, Marcus Welby M.D. and Dr. Kildare. Partners in Practice was set in the new sprawling suburban Dublin in the fictional town of Sallybawn. Sallybawn was based on the new 1970s sprawling developments such as Tallaght. The series was set in the fictional Sallybawn Health Centre. It ran for one season in 1972 and was written by Carolyn Swift. In 1978 Louis Lentin became head of RTÉ Drama having produced Uncle Vanya (1970), King of Friday's Men (1967) and King of the Castle (1977). He started Thursday Playdate, these were once of plays which dramatized current events and current affairs in Ireland. He would also be responsible for The Spike a controversial drama that was to run for 10 weeks only to be taken of the after the fifth episode. Problems surrounded both the content (A very critical look at the VEC system in Irish Education) and poor scriptwriting to deal with major issues.

==== 1980s ====
RTÉ One had a major success with 1980s Strumpet City based on the novel by James Plunkett about the 1913 Dublin Lockout. It was successfully sold around the world to various countries including the USSR. The Year of The French was a major follow up period drama with twice the production budget as Strumpet City, however it was not as successful. The Year of The French was one of the many co-productions that RTÉ produced during the 1980s, it was co-produced with the UK's Channel 4 and France's FR2.

In 1983 RTÉ produced a World War II drama titled Caught in a Free State. The four-part series was set against the backdrop of Irish Neutrality during the Second World War. It surrounded the true stories of German Spies in Ireland. The series was a co-production with Channel 4. Other Channel 4/RTÉ co-productions from the 1980s include The Irish R.M. and Echoes.

In the mid-1980s RTÉ developed a sitcom called Leave It to Mrs O'Brien which centred on the housekeeper of a Parish Priest. It is often quoted as one of the comedies which shows that RTÉ cannot produce good comedy. The series was a critical and audience failure. RTÉ would not produce another sitcom until the mid-1990s, while being criticized for not commissioning another series that featured a Parish Priest Housekeeper.

In 1989, RTÉ returned with a new drama series based in Dublin city called Fair City. In 2010, the show has celebrated its 20th anniversary since it first broadcast. The show continues to air four nights a week on RTÉ One.

==== 1990s ====
In 1993, RTÉ One began to broadcast TG4's soap Ros na Rún. The show initially broadcast for a short season each year. The show no-longer airs on RTÉ One, but instead airs each night on TG4. The show also airs on television in Scotland and America. In 1994 RTÉ broadcast Family by Roddy Doyle, a co-production with the BBC.

In 1993 RTÉ produced a sitcom set in a newspaper office called Extra! Extra! Read All About It! (also known as Extra! Extra!). It was poorly received, critics stating the scripts lacked any humour and that the direction was poor. Reviewing the programme for the Sunday Independent, writer Colm Tóibín called it "probably the worst programme RTÉ has ever shown". The Irish Times' Brendan Glacken was equally scathing: "Speaking of Extra! Extra!, as I am afraid we still must, even seasoned RTÉ observers seem unable to answer the question why a series so pathetically weak should have been allowed to reach the screen at all". The Irish Independent later listed it as one of the worst Irish TV shows ever.

In the mid-1990s RTÉ return to sitcom with the development of Upwardly Mobile which ran for 3 seasons. The series was a critical failure but it often land in RTÉ top programmes each week. At the same time British station Channel 4 commissioned Father Ted, which RTÉ is often incorrectly accused of turning down. RTÉ would not return to sitcoms until 2001 when The Cassidys appeared on RTÉ Two this was also a failure however two other successive comedies appeared in the same year on RTÉ Two, Bachelors Walk and Paths to Freedom. RTÉ One's next comedy series would not appear until 2003 with the arrival of Killinaskully.

In the late 1990s RTÉ co-produced many period dramas based on novels by significant modern day Irish novelists, such as Falling for a Dancer and Amongst Women. They also produced the police procedural Making the Cut and its spin-off series DDU.

==== 2000s ====
As a replacement for the axed rural soap Glenroe RTÉ commissioned On Home Ground, surrounding a rural GAA club. The series was not well received and was replaced in 2003 by The Clinic. The Clinic was an award-winning primetime television medical drama series produced by Parallel Film Productions for RTÉ. The show ran for seven seasons between September 2003 to November 2009. The last episode aired on RTÉ One on Sunday, 15 November 2009. The show was so successful that it also aired in Finland, New Zealand, Australia, Iceland, Scotland and Portugal.

Since 2000 RTÉ has increased its output of specialized dramas. These drama's have discussed a broad range of issues such as the Irish Hepatitis C scandal in No Tears (2002) which featured Academy Award Winner Brenda Fricker.

In 2003 RTÉ returned to comedy with the rural based Killinaskully series. The series was produced by Irish Comedian Pat Shortt. The series was a critical failure but according to one critic this was due to the rural/urban divide and "because TV critics tend to stand very firmly on one side of that gap, they have seldom attempted to understand the popularity of something so old-fashioned, predictable and lazy.". The series was a huge audience success for the channel often getting over 500,000 every Sunday night, with its Christmas specials becoming some of Ireland's most watched TV programmes during its run.

In 2004 RTÉ co-produced with Denmark's TV2 a gritty drama series based on criminality in Dublin City. Proof aired for two seasons and starred Orla Brady. In 2006 RTÉ broadcast a fictional drama based on a nuclear fallout called Fallout. Following this another drama appeared on RTÉ One in September 2006, the docudrama about the Stardust disaster, entitled Stardust, to mark the 25th anniversary of the incident.

In 2007, RTÉ began the drama series Single-Handed. Three episodes of the series ran over the course of three years when ITV bought the rights to the show in 2009, which led to the co-production of the fourth series with Britain's ITV.

In 2007, RTÉ aired Damage a drama which focused on rape and sexual abuse. In 2008, RTÉ produced Whistleblower this drama highlighted irregular obstetric practices within Irish hospitals. Another drama in 2008 included Bitter Sweet. This drama follows the difficulties encountered by three female friends who undergo difficult changes to their respective lives.

In 2009 RTÉ commissioned a second Pat Shortt comedy titled Mattie. Mattie initially centred on the move of a rural Garda to the big city, however the series received poor reviews and audience figures were lacklustre. RTÉ attempted to re-launch the show asSTG Mattie the following year this time keeping Garda Mattie in country surrounding and adding a laughter track.

In June 2009 RTÉ broadcast Father & Son co-produced with ITV.

==== 2010s ====
The 2010 Live Aid biopic When Harvey met Bobby (surrounding the relationship between Bob Geldof and Harvey Goldsmith) was co-produced with the BBC. Wild Decembers based on the novel by Edna O'Brien aired at Christmas 2010.

In 2010 their drama series Raw moved from RTÉ Two to RTÉ One. RAW ran for 5 seasons with its final season airing in 2013. The series centred on a busy Dublin Restaurant.

The series Love/Hate (starring Aidan Gillen) detailing the lives of the Dublin's criminal underworld began in 2010. Love/Hate has since gone on to become one of Ireland most respected TV dramas, before ceasing production after 5 seasons in 2015.

In 2011 RTÉ co-produced Brendan O'Carroll's Mrs. Brown's Boys with Boxpic and BBC Scotland for BBC One. The series airs first on RTÉ One as BBC One is largely available across Ireland.

The BBC Two detective drama The Fall starring Gillian Anderson was produced in association with RTÉ and aired on RTÉ One. RTÉ will also air Quirke a Dublin-based detective series, starring Gabriel Byrne and commissioned by the BBC and The Irish Film Board.

A drama surrounding the disappearance of a young girl aired in 2014, titled Amber. It is directed by Thaddeus O'Sullivan and stars Eva Birthistle and David Murray. Due to financial difficulties at RTÉ the series broadcast date was postponed for 2 years, the four-part series aired across 4 consecutive days. The four-part caused controversy with viewers and critics due its open ending.

It was reported that a fifth season of Single Handed was to be produced by RTÉ and ITV, however the series did not get the required funding. A drama surrounding the Irish banking crisis has yet to be announced.

A series surrounding the life of former Taoiseach Charlie Haughey is expected in 2015. Aidan Gillen will play the title role in Haughey.

For the first time in nearly 30 years RTÉ returned to the Television play in 2014. Three Irish writers Fiona Looney, Deirdre Purcell and Pat McCabe wrote 3 different plays for Play Next Door. The writers were sent to different parts of the country and were told to set their work in a building in the locality. A documentary followed each of the writers as they lived in the towns, it was followed by the play.

=== Entertainment ===
==== Chat shows ====
RTÉ's flagship chat show is The Late Late Show. It has aired on the channel since the summer of 1962. It is the second longest-running chat show and Europe's longest-running chat show. From 1962 until 1999 it was presented by Gay Byrne. In September 1999, Pat Kenny took over the role and after hosting nine seasons as Late Late host he stepped down to host a new political programme. In September 2009, Ryan Tubridy took over as host until he stepped down in 2023. In September 2023, Patrick Kielty took over hosting the show. In its early years the show was known for its controversies. Most Irish chat shows continue to use a similar formula to The Late Late Show, most shows are live and contain a mix of serious and entertaining interviews.

In the late 1970s and early 1980s the biggest rival to The Late Late Show was The Live Mike, hosted by Mike Murphy. The show was a mix of comedy sketches and interviews. Mike Murphy decided to leave the show and it was replaced by Saturday Live in the mid-1980s, the series had a new host each week. It in turn was replaced by Kenny Live hosted by Pat Kenny, who had been a guest presenter on Saturday Live. Kenny Live was more entertainment focused then The Late Late Show, however towards the end of the show Pat Kenny would do a one-to-one interview on topical subjects, e.g. Families of missing people.

Most summers RTÉ provide a chat show. They have included Limelight hosted by Carrie Crowley, Good Grief Moncreiff hosted by Sean Moncreiff, BiBi hosted by Bibi Baskin, Kennedy hosted by Mary Kennedy and the most recent series Saturday Night with Miriam with Miriam O'Callaghan. The show is well known for its wide variety of guests, which often include musicians, who usually perform on the show. The Duckworth Lewis Method made their television debut on Saturday Night with Miriam in 2009's season opener.

Before hosting The Late Late Show, Ryan Tubridy hosted his own Saturday night chat show between 2004 and 2009, called Tubridy Tonight. After Pat Kenny left Kenny Live RTÉ produced a similar series to the 1980s Saturday Live this time called Saturday Night Live again with a different host each week, the series last until 2002. In 2003 The Late Late Show went into competition with Dunphy Live on TV3, however it only lasted until December 2003. Though RTÉ had stopped producing a Saturday Night chatshow that year, TV3 decided to air Dunphy Live on a Friday Night.

RTÉ produced two pilot shows for Saturday Night in 2010. The Saturday Night Show (2010–2015) and Tonight with Craig Doyle (2010). Both of these shows are aimed to replace the highly successful Tubridy Tonight which ended in 2009,

Hosted by Brendan O'Connor called The Saturday Night Show it was given an initial run of 8 weeks, it now airs every Saturday night.

Craig Doyle was also given his own chat show. It replaced The Saturday Night Show. Tonight with Craig Doyle and ran on RTÉ One from 18 April 2010 for 8 weeks.

In 2011 Gay Byrne returned with For One Night Only. It started with an hour-long interview with boyband Westlife, which included many of their hits, similar episodes included Imelda May and Christy Moore.

In 2013 Imelda May returned for her own music show The Imelda May Show.

==== Game shows/quiz shows ====
In the 1960s and 1970s RTÉ ran the Quicksilver quiz show presented by Bunny Carr. The show would tour the country and visit different towns. The contestants were picked at random to answer the questions, due to this random selection process the show is fondly remembered for questions such as "What the term for a male bee?" and the answer "a wasp?". It also coined an Irish phrase "stop the lights", usually stated when something is surprising.

In the 1980s RTÉ produced game shows like Play the Game, and Gerry Ryan's Secrets and quiz shows "Murphy's Micro-Quiz-M" (hosted by Mike Murphy), Where in the World? (hosted by Theresa Lowe), Rapid Roulette (hosted by Maxi) and Know Your Sport (hosted by George Hamilton).

Since 1989 RTÉ have produced a game show with the Irish National Lottery. Winning Streak was the first such show originally hosted by Mike Murphy, who had had previous success with his chat show The Live Mike and the Irish version of Candid Camera. He had also present Mike's Micro Quiz a family quiz show that included a "hi-tech" games machine. Winning Steak started off as a half-hour show on Friday nights in the late 1980s and by the mid-1990 was an hour-long Saturday night game show. In the mid-1990s Winning Streak was joined by other National Lottery game shows including Millionaire and Fame and Fortune hosted by Marty Whelan, Telly Bingo hosted by Liz Bonnin.

In the 1990s RTÉ had international success with The Lyrics Board, while it was derided by the critics the format was sold in many European countries. The show was originally presented by Aonghus McAnally during its initially run and in the 2000s by Linda Martin. Quiz shows included Challenging Times (hosted by Kevin Myres) and Dodge The Question (hosted by Jonathan Philbin Bowman). The 1990s saw RTÉ's version of Talkabout hosted by Ian Dempsey and later by Alan Hughes.

After Gay Byrne's decision to leave The Late Late Show, he was brought back by the station to host the Irish version of Who Wants to Be a Millionaire? however after two seasons the show was dropped as RTÉ were unable to find a sponsor after Vodafone Eircell pulled its sponsorship, the producers (Tyrone Productions) and RTÉ were in discussions with the National Lottery for a scratch card version of the show, ironically the National Lottery had defended the use of the term Millionaire a number of years previously due to its scratch card and TV game show Millionaire hosted by Marty Whelan for RTÉ. RTÉ One broadcast two editions of the Irish version of Test the Nation presented by Miriam O'Callaghan in 2006 and 2007.

==== Music ====
- RTÉ One has shown many Irish traditional music shows including The Pure Drop and Come West Along The Road.
- Number 1 was a pop music quiz show from the 1980s and they also aired Top of the Pops.
- During the 1980s they had several live music shows with famous Irish stars of the time including The Sandy Kelly Show.
- In the late 1980s and early 1990s Marty Whelan hosted a popular talent search called GFI: Go For It. In the mid-1990s RTÉ co-produced a talent series with BBC Northern Ireland called Let Me Entertain You hosted by Gerry Ryan, a 16-year-old Samantha Mumba was one of the finalists.
- RTÉ One has also several documentaries about Irish Country Music and the Showband era entitled A Little Bit Country/Showband, hosted and produced by Shay Healey. In 2009 they broadcast All Ireland Choir Competition 2009.

==== Reality TV ====
Since the start of the 2000s RTÉ have produced several Reality TV programmes for RTÉ One. In 2001, RTÉ One broadcast the successful Popstars format to find Ireland's next top pop band. The eventual winners were the band members of Six, including on Nadine Coyle, however due to her age at the time she had to be dropped from the band, and went on to appear in Popstars: The Rivals on ITV1 becoming a member of the girl band Girls Aloud. Due to the success in the Popstars format RTÉ set about looking for a new series for 2002, You're a Star was a similar show to American Idol and The X Factor, running from 2002 to 2008, during which they select acts to go to the Eurovision Song Contest. In 2008 it was replaced by the All Ireland Talent Show. The All Ireland Talent Show has since been replaced by the international Singing format The Voice of Ireland which begins on RTÉ One in January 2012. In 2010 they broadcast Fame: The Musical a reality TV talent search for stars of the stage version of the highly successful film and TV series Fame.

Other reality shows include two seasons (2001 and 2002) of Treasure Island similar in format to Survivor. Senator Mark Daly appeared in the second series, coming third overall. Cabin Fever (2003) which had a group of people set sail around the Irish coast, this caused controversy when the ship ran aground halfway through the series.

RTÉ One has also produce celebrity versions of their reality TV shows. Charity You're a Star, Celebrity Farm and Fáilte Towers have all gained respectable audiences but critics have been less than impressed. RTÉ's most successful celebrity reality TV is The Restaurant.

=== Factual ===
Garda Patrol ran for a number of years on RTÉ One. It was a fifteen-minute weekly show asking for help with crimes from the public. In the early 1990s RTÉ revamped the show as a monthly hour-long show called Crime Line, hosted by David Harvey and Marian Finucane (Towards the end of the series was hosted by Anne Doyle). In the mid-2000s RTÉ replaced CrimeLine with a similar show Crime Call. Crime Call is presented by Anne Cassin and Con Murphy.

- Radharc (an Irish term for view, vision, spectacle or sight) aired from the 1960s and the 1990s. They were documentaries filmed by Catholic priests. The series produced 400 documentaries which focused on some regional stories but mainly international stories about Catholic Missionaries around the world and world events. The series came about during the 1950s as public discussion centred on the new television services. The documentaries all took a religious angle on events. The Irish Film Institute (IFI) are the custodians of the Radharc documentaries.
- To the Waters and the Wild
- Waterways
- Who Do You Think You Are?
- Blood of the Irish

==== History ====
- Reeling in the Years is one of RTÉ most popular history strands, it provides a history of Ireland from 1962 to 2009, it began as part of RTÉ Autumn 1999 schedule as Reeling in the Years 1980s, 1990s in 2000, 1970s in 2002, 1960s in 2004, 2000s in 2010, 2010s most recently in 2021 it's possible a future series on the 2020s will be made in 2030. It was archive clips from Irish and international archives showing the big events of the world from an Irish perspective including 2 Eurovision wins, 3 Irish general elections in one year, the Recession, Migration, DeLorean Motor Company, GUBU, Ronald Reagan's visit to Ireland, All Ireland Championship wins etc. 1960–1969, 1970–1979 and 1990–1999 were all broadcast, events included the Dublin/Monaghan bombings, U2's first TV appearance, Slane Concerts, the axing of The Riordans, Riverdance, Miley and Fidelma's hay shed love in Glenroe, Twin Peaks to more serious news such as the Omagh bombings, The Good Friday Agreement, The resignation of the Minister for Foreign Affairs Ray Burke and the inauguration of president Mary Robinson etc.
- True Lives
- Hidden Histories

==== Arts ====
- Arts Lives is a series of arts documentaries produced by independent producers for RTÉ. They may also be co-funded by other broadcasters from around Europe. Some of the documentaries include: The Riordans: Tea, Taboos & Tractors about the successful rural soap opera, John O'Conor's Beethoven Boot Camp, Hugh Leonard: Odd Man In, Patrick Collins: Through Sligo Eyes, Graham Linehan – Funny Business and Ronnie Drew – September Song.
- The View was a weekly arts and cultural review programme broadcast each Tuesday night up until 2011. It was original broadcast on RTÉ Two as Later on 2.

=== Young people's programmes ===
Up to 1988 the majority of RTÉ's children's programmes were aired on RTÉ One. In the early years these shows included Dáithí Lacha an Irish Language animated series about a duck. In the 1970s they produced Wanderly Wagon which was developed for RTÉ by Eugene Lambert and a spin-off show in the 1980s called Fortycoats & Co. however Eugene Lambert is on the record as saying that he was not involved and that RTÉ just rehashed old Wanderly Wagon stories. The 1980s saw RTÉ's first Saturday morning children's strand called Anything Goes, this was followed by Action Station Saturday and Pajo's Junkbox. In the 1990s their Saturday mornings included Pajo's The Whole Shabang and Scratch Saturday which included The Fanta Roadshow Chart with Andy Ruane, various changes took place on Saturday mornings during the 1990s with the final RTÉ One children's morning strand coming from RTÉ Cork called The Swamp. In the late 1990s all children's weekend programming was fully moved to Network 2 with T/X and The Disney Club. Dempsey's Den aired on the channel from 1986 to 1988, Zig and Zag made their debuts on RTÉ One. Since 1988 the majority of RTÉ's children programming airs on its sister channel RTÉ Two. RTÉ Two provide different strands of programming tailored at different age groups these include: RTÉjr (1- to 6-year-olds), TRTÉ (7- to 15-year-olds), TwoTube (16- to 22-year-olds). Since 2011 RTÉ has a dedicated service for preschoolers called RTÉjr.

Every Saturday night RTÉ One at 18:30 airs The Big Big Movie this strand features movies which a tailored towards a family audience.

=== Daytime ===
In the early 1980s, RTÉ began testing daytime television for audiences on RTÉ One. This was a major commitment since RTÉ Two was failing to gain audience that it required. Their first daytime show was hosted by Thelma Mansfield – one of their regular continuity announcers – Good Afternoon was a mix of live interviews, music, children's television and soap operas.

In 1986, RTÉ debuted its new afternoon show which featured a mixture of daytime chat and children's television. In September the channel aired Live at 3 broadcasting from 15:00 each weekday. This was followed by a new children's series Dempsey's Den. Live at 3 was presented by Derek Davis and Thelma Mansfield from 1986 to 1997. It included a broad range of topics (healthcare, cookery, DIY, fashion and culture). It was a major departure for the daytime schedule and in an interview with TV Now Derek Davis described how many other European broadcasters were travelling over to Ireland to visit this mix genre daytime TV chat show.

In 1997 with the departure of Derek Davis, Live at 3 was merged with another TV series called 12 to 1. 12 to 1 was similar in style to Live at 3 only it concentrated on Light chat with hosts Marty Whelan and Ciana Campbell. Ciana Campbell had prior to this tested out a live afternoon phone in show (called Over to You), similar in format to RTÉ Radio's successfully Liveline, this eventually led to 12 to 1.

In the late 1990s Marty Whelan, Ciana Campbell and Thelma Mansfield all remained as part of the daytime TV line-up and featured on PM Live. In 1999, Thelma Mansfield retired from RTÉ to concentrate on her art career. This later led to the demise of PM Live, which was replaced in September 1999, with Open House.

Open House was the first time that RTÉ had an independent producer produce their daytime TV service. Tyrone Productions produced the show in the RTÉ studios and it was hosted by Mary Kennedy and Marty Whelan from 1999 to 2003.

In 2004, RTÉ revamped their daytime schedule and axed Open House and replaced it with two new shows, The Afternoon Show and "The Big Bite". "The Big Bite" was an unusual departure for RTÉ's daytime schedule as it had heavier content than previous shows which aired in this time-slot, it was hosted by economist David McWilliams. The Big Bite was replaced with Seoige and O'Shea, which was also produced by Tyrone Productions. Joe O'Shea and Grainne Seoige presented the show together for 2 seasons until Joe O'Shea left in 2007, he was replaced by Grainne's sister Síle Seoige and the show was rename Seoige. Seoige lasted one season and was replaced by an extended version of The Afternoon Show produced by Green Inc Productions for RTÉ.

The Afternoon Show was first presented by Anna Nolan, Blathnaid Ni Chofaigh and Sheana Keane. Anna Nolan left the show after a year to focus on more serious TV such as RTÉ's Would You Believe series of documentaries. Blathanid and Sheana both worked on the show together for a number of years until 2008 (when it was reported they had had a falling out), various presenters stepping into either Blathanid's or Sheana's shoes, with the final series being presented by Sheana and Maura Derrane (former Ireland AM presenter).

In 2010, RTÉ One revamped its afternoon schedule, which will debut in September 2010. RTÉ set about seeking tenders from independent producers, as a consequence of this process RTÉ axed The Afternoon Show. Two new afternoon shows began in September 2010, 4 Live and The Daily Show. 4 Live was presented by Maura Derrane (former co-presenter of The Afternoon Show), while The Daily Show was presented by TG4 Weather Man Dáithí Ó Sé and former TV3 News presenter Claire Byrne. Both shows were broadcast from 16:00 to 17:45 GMT. Both new daytime shows are produced by Green Inc. for RTÉ. The programmes were axed in March 2012. In October 2012 RTÉ moved their main afternoon programmes to Cork. Today is hosted by Maura Derrane and Dáithí Ó Sé, while Claire Byrne moved to Prime Time and RTÉ Radio 1's Saturday with Claire Byrne. On Friday's Blathnaid Ni Chofaigh and Norah Casey (Dragon's Den Ireland).

In January 2013 RTÉ launched their first morning TV news service on RTÉ One and RTÉ News Now Morning Edition, the programme airs from 9 am to 11 am Monday to Friday. Morning Edition is presented by Keelin Shanley.

In 2017 Stellify Media produced Goodbye House, a property show in which three siblings compete to find the perfect home for their parents.

=== Lifestyle ===
In the 1980s RTÉ One's lifestyle programming consisted of shows such as

- Check Up – A weekly health show
- Head 2 Toe – A weekly fashion series
- See Here – A weekly consumers show
- Family Matters – A weekly issue based show for parents, hosted by Eamon Lawlor and Caroline Murphy.

Much of RTÉ's lifestyle output was produced in-house until the 1990s when Independent Producers began producing shows such as: -

- About the House – An Educational/Lifestyle show about home renovations
- Ear to the Ground – A weekly Agricultural magazine show
- Beyond The Hall Door – A studio based Interior design show by the 2000s it had left the studio to do up homes
- Bon Voyage – A travel show
- Darina Allen – A cookery Show

Most of RTÉ's Lifestyle programming is air Monday to Friday between 19:00 and 21:00, and repeated on Saturday and Sunday mornings. Their current set of lifestyle programmes include About the House, Showhouse, Heat and Rachel Allen: Bakes.

=== Imported programming ===
==== 1961–1969 ====
RTÉ One has always relied on a certain amount of programming from abroad and they have also always been under pressure from UK TV channels to provide programming from other countries. The 1960s on RTÉ is characterized by American and British imports such as Annie Oakley, Everglades, Have Gun Will Travel, The Donna Reed Show, The Adventures of Robin Hood, Batman, The Man from U.N.C.L.E., The Andy Williams Show, The Dick Van Dyke Show, Robinson Crusoe, Lucy Show, Dr. Finlay's Casebook, The World Around Us, The World of Wooster and Sherlock Holmes. Children's programming at this time consisted of such shows as The Road Runner Show, The Flintstones, Skippy and Quick Draw McGraw. In 1963 they also broadcast Italian lessons Parliamo Italiano.

==== 1970–1979 ====
RTÉ began expanding its schedule during the 1970s with educational and children's programming being broadcast from 11 am. Children's shows imported for the channel included Tarzan, Modern Madcaps, The Road Runner Show, Land of the Giants, Apple's Way, Babar, Noddy, Sesame Street, Gemini Man, Clue Club and Scooby-Doo, while educational programming included Education: Zarabanda, First Steps in First Aid and German Lesson other daytime shows included South Riding, The Pallisers and Thrill Seekers. Prime time imports included Lights Out, The Spanish Farm, The Brady Bunch, Bridget Loves Bernie, Fawlty Towers, Little House on the Prairie, "The Waltons", "Poldark" The Muppet Show, Anne of the Thousand Days, Midnight Is a Place, Are You Being Served?. In 1978 RTÉ One began broadcasting many UK TV show such as ITV's Sale of the Century and Match of the Day which was simulcast with the BBC. RTÉ Two began broadcasting on 2 November 1978.

==== 1980–1989 ====
During the 1980s many of the language courses on during daytime hours moved to the weekend, children's was presented first as Good Afternoon with many adult daytime shows mixed in, until 1986 when Dempsey's Den started to broadcast, imports for Children included The World of Jules Verne, Ludwig, Yogi's Treasure Hunt, Danger Bay, Arthur and the Square Knights of the Round Table, Supergran, European Folk Tales, Kaboodle and The Real Ghostbusters. Other daytime shows included Upstairs Downstairs and Emmerdale Farm. Prime time imports included American shows such as The Cheryl Ladd Special, Here's Lucy, Ride on Stranger, Falcon Crest, Miami Vice, Benson", Dallas", Magnum, P.I., The Paul Anka Show, Remington Steele, Murder, She Wrote, Spenser for Hire, The Cosby Show, The Twilight Zone, The Days and Nights of Molly Dodd, Evening Extra, Turning Point, On the Town, Our House, The Ray Bradbury Theatre. British imports included Are You Being Served?, Codename Icarus, The Paper Lads, Dempsey and Makepeace, Tomorrow's World and Executive Stress.

In 1988 RTÉ Two re-branded as Network 2 which saw RTÉ move many of its children's and imported shows over to Network 2.

==== 1990–1999 ====
Children's shows remained on RTÉ 1 on Saturday morning for most of the 1990s imports included DuckTales, Batman, Family Ties, The Disney Hour, Katts and Dog, Nellie the Elephant and The Pink Panther Show. Daytime TV consisted of repeats and daytime soaps such as Little House on the Prairie, The New Adventures of Black Beauty, CHiPs, Delia Smith's Cookery Course, Emmerdale, Knots Landing, A Country Practice, Perry Mason, Carson's Law, The Love Boat, G. P., The Sullivans, Santa Barbara, Randall and Hopkirk (Deceased), Take the High Road, Forever Green and Highway to Heaven. American prime time show imported at the time included Star Trek: The Next Generation, Mancuso, F.B.I., The Cosby Show, St. Elsewhere, MacGyver, Masquerade, Father Dowling Mysteries, Dallas, Midnight Caller, Home Improvement, Space: Above and Beyond, JAG, Dr. Quinn, Medicine Woman, RoboCop, Lois & Clark: The New Adventures of Superman, ER and The Practice. British shows broadcast included Bergerac, Agatha Christie's Poirot, After Henry, The Ruth Rendell Mysteries, An Audience with... Victoria Wood, Lovejoy, Hearts and Minds, Ballykissangel and from 1992 to 2001 Coronation Street. Educational programming at the time moved to Sunday morning including Espana Viva, A Vous La France and Russian Language and People. 28 January 1991 saw the last episode of cult favourite Twin Peaks broadcast on RTÉ 1.

==== 2000–2009 ====
Since the late 1990s RTÉ One's prime time schedule is made up of nearly 100% Irish programming, some exceptions include EastEnders, The Midweek Movie, The Big Big Movie and with a few classic repeats intermittently such as Fawlty Towers and Only Fools and Horses. RTÉ One's other daytime imports are made up of soap operas (such as the Australian soaps Neighbours and Home and Away, the New Zealand soap Shortland Street, the British soaps Doctors and EastEnders), American detective dramas (including the highly repeatable Murder, She Wrote) and since 2001 they have broadcast American daytime chat shows (including The Doctors and Dr. Phil, they also broadcast Oprah). American dramas broadcast from 2000 to 2009 included ER, Grey's Anatomy, The Practice, Prison Break, Damages, Shark, Two and a Half Men, Medium, Mad Men, and The West Wing. British dramas Spooks and Waking the Dead have also aired on the channel. During the 2000s RTÉ broadcast the ITV soap The Bill over two half-hour episodes Monday to Friday at 17:30, rather than the original hour-long episodes. RTÉ One also broadcast the revived ITV soap, Crossroads.

==== 2010–2019 ====
RTÉ One launched its 2010 schedule with The Mentalist as a replacement for the long running Sunday night drama ER. Other imports included Who Do You Think You Are? both the British and American versions which coincided with their broadcast of the Irish version. On 4 August 2010, RTÉ launched its schedule which included imports Mad Men and Masterchef Australia. RTÉ One also broadcast Packed to the Rafters, The Bill, Medium and McLeod's Daughters. Daytime repeats now include Desperate Housewives, The Good Wife and Brothers & Sisters. New episodes of The Good Wife move to RTÉ One in 2013. A&E's Longmire began airing in 2013. Late night TV consists largely of imported programming such as Australian drama serials Rush, Blue Heelers and Tangle.

==== 2020–present ====
Mainly COVID-19 to start the new decade. New look planned for Autumn 2022. New idents for the 1st time since November 3, 2006 on April 25, 2023.

== On-air identity ==
In 1966, the radio and television stations adopted the common brand Radio Telifís Éireann in line with the renamed broadcasting authority, and the ident used the acronym RTE, with no síneadh fada diacritic over the E of Éireann. The 1995 logo was the first to read RTÉ rather than RTE.

A new appearance and ident of RTÉ One (including the "ONE" in a new font) launched on 1 January 2014. The channel is now referred to as 'RTÉ ONE HD' on Saorview.
