= Maura Derrane =

Irish television presenter and journalist

- Born: Maura Catherine Derrane; 8 July 1970 (age 55); Inishmore, County Galway, Ireland
- Occupations: Journalist , TV & Radio Presenter
- Employer: RTÉ
- Known for: Presenting work on RTÉ, TV3 and TG4.
- Television: RTÉ News; TV3 News; Ireland AM; The Afternoon Show; Four Live; Today
- Spouse: John Deasy (m. 2005)
- Children: 1

Maura Catherine Derrane (born 8 July 1970) is an Irish television presenter and journalist. She currently works for RTÉ, having previously worked for TV3 and TG4.

Derrane is a from Inishmore, County Galway. She previously worked as a researcher for RTÉ News in Galway. In 1996, she moved to TnaG as a news reporter. From 1998, she worked for TV3 News. She worked as a news reporter and crime correspondent.

From 2004 to 2006, she was a co-presenter on Ireland AM. She has presented three series of Feirm Factor on TG4.

Derrane presented The Afternoon Show from October 2009, with Sheana Keane. The programme was dropped after the launch of the 2010 new season of RTÉ Television, and replaced by two other afternoon chat shows. Four Live was presented by Derrane, and was followed by The Daily Show presented by Dáithí Ó Sé and Claire Byrne. These ended in March 2012.

Today debuted in November 2012, and is hosted each weekday by Maura Derrane and Dáithí Ó Sé.

== Personal life ==
In 2005, she married politician John Deasy and lived with him in Dungarvan, County Waterford. She gave birth to a son in May 2014, and later moved with her family to Dublin.
