= Gerald Fleming =

Irish meteorologist (b. 1957)

- Born: 20 November 1957 (age 68); County Wexford, Ireland
- Education: University College Dublin
- Occupations: Head of Forecasting, Met Éireann
- Notable credit: Met Éireann forecast on RTÉ
- Spouse: Mary Duggan
- Children: 3

Gerald Fleming (born 20 November 1957) is an Irish former meteorologist and weather presenter. He joined Met Éireann in 1980 and worked as co-ordinator of the RTÉ Television weather team. He served as Head of Forecasting in Met Éireann until his retirement in December 2017. He is now involved with the World Bank and travels all over the world helping other countries improve their weather stations.

== Early and personal life ==
He was born in County Wexford, where he still lives today. He attended a local Christian Brothers school. He is married to Mary Duggan, an architect, and has three children and one grandson.

He has been involved with the Wexford Swimming Club, Leinster Swimming, and the Wexford Arts Centre.

== Career ==
Fleming attended University College Dublin where he studied for four years. He earned a Bachelor of Science in Experimental Physics. In 1980 he achieved a Master of Science following two years of research in the Atmospherics Group of the UCD Physics Department. When he left university, he moved straight to Irish Met Service. After sixteen months training, he was deployed to Dublin Airport as an aviation forecaster. He moved to the Glasnevin base two years later.

He gave his first weather forecast in July 1985. In 1990, he was made co-ordinator of weather at RTÉ Television. While on television he was noted for his tendency to wink.

He has served as Chairperson of the International Association of Broadcast Meteorology and co-chair of the First World Conference on Broadcast Meteorology. He has also chaired the Expert Team on Media Issues for the World Meteorological Organisation and since 2005 has been Chair of the Public Weather Service Delivery Programme Group for WMO, and a member of the Management Group on the WMO Commission for Basic Systems.

Fleming was Head of the General Forecasting Division in Met Éireann until his retirement in December 2017. In that position he representatived Met Éireann to the media. He was also a regular contributor to Mooney on RTÉ Radio 1. He currently works with the World Bank helping the international community improve weather stations. He is the treasurer of the International Association of Broadcast Meteorology (IABM).
