= Mary Kennedy =

Irish television presenter and writer

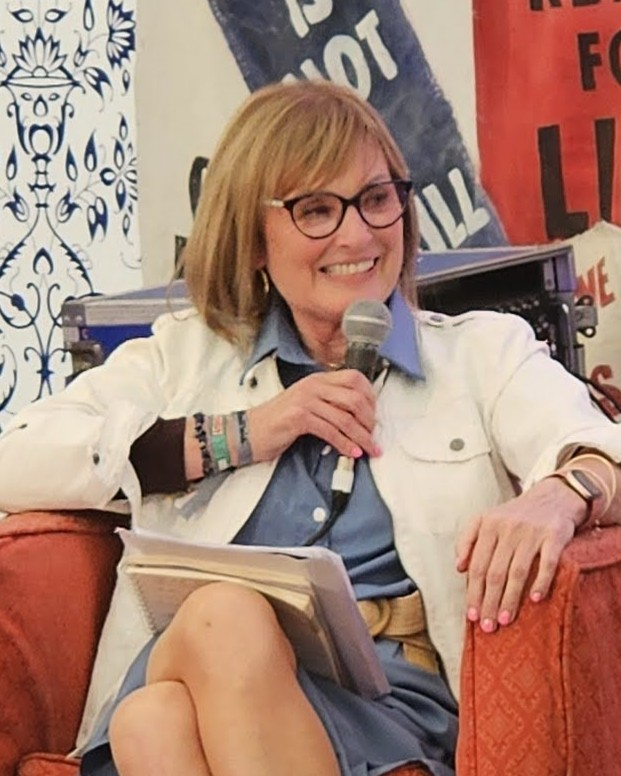
- Kennedy in 2024
- Born: 4 October 1954 (age 72); Clondalkin, Dublin, Ireland
- Education: University College Dublin (UCD)
- Occupations: Broadcaster; writer
- Employer: RTÉ
- Known for: Eurovision Song Contest 1995, Kennedy, Open House, Up for the Match, People of the Year Awards, Nationwide
- Height: 5 ft 4 in (163 cm)

Mary Kennedy (Irish: Máire Ní Chinnéide; born 4 October 1954) is an Irish television personality and former newscaster, and writer. She presented the Eurovision Song Contest 1995 from the Point Theatre in Dublin. She has also presented her own Saturday night chat show called Kennedy, a precursor to Saturday Night with Miriam. Kennedy was co-presenter of the magazine programme Open House with Marty Whelan. She has previously presented Up for the Match and the People of the Year Awards. She was co-presenter of Nationwide with Anne Cassin until 2019, having been so for a time with Michael Ryan.

== Early life ==
Born in Clondalkin, Dublin, Kennedy was educated at Coláiste Bríde in Clondalkin and University College Dublin, where she graduated with a Bachelor of Arts. She taught English in Brittany, France, before returning to her Coláiste Bríde to teach Irish and French.

== Broadcasting ==
Kennedy's broadcasting career started in 1978 when she applied for a job as continuity announcer at RTÉ. She went on to join the RTÉ News team, becoming a newscaster. She has also presented Eurovision Song Contest 1995, a Saturday night chat show called Kennedy, and was co-presenter with Marty Whelan on the magazine programme Open House. She presented Up for the Match and the People of the Year Awards, until RTÉ replaced her in both jobs with a younger presenter, Gráinne Seoige.

Kennedy began working as Michael Ryan's co-presenter on the RTÉ local affairs show Nationwide.

In April 2008, she commented on RTÉ television coverage of the state funeral of former President of Ireland Patrick Hillery. In May 2011, she fronted RTÉ television coverage of Queen Elizabeth II's visit to Ireland. She also provided commentary at the inauguration of the ninth President of Ireland, Michael D. Higgins.

She has read the news on RTÉ Radio 1.

She has been a judge at the Rose of Tralee.

== Writing ==
In 2003, Kennedy published her memoirs, titled Paper Tigers.

Lines I Love was shortlisted for an Irish Book Award. Lines for Living was published in 2011.

== Personal life ==
Her niece, Clare, was the girlfriend of Garda Ciaran Jones, swept to his death in the River Liffey after he tried to help motorists during torrential rain in October 2011. Her nephew is singer-songwriter, Dermot Kennedy.

== Awards ==
Kennedy was voted VIP magazine's "Most Stylish Woman in Ireland" in 2003.

Year	Nominee / work	Award	Result
2003	Mary Kennedy	"Most Stylish Woman in Ireland" (VIP)	Won
2011	Lines I Love	Irish Book Award	Nominated

== See also ==
- List of Eurovision Song Contest presenters

Preceded by (Republic of Ireland) Gerry Ryan & Cynthia Ní Mhurchú	Eurovision Song Contest presenter 1995	Succeeded by (Norway) Morten Harket & Ingvild Bryn
