= Southern Nights =

Southern Nights may refer to:

- Southern Nights, a (1996-1997) Irish television series
- Southern Nights (Glen Campbell album), a 1977 album by Glen Campbell

- "Southern Nights" (song), a single from this album

- Southern Nights (Allen Toussaint album), a 1975 album by Allen Toussaint
- Southern Nights (Sullivan Fortner album), an album by Sullivan Fortner
- Southern Nights (film), a 1953 West German musical film
