= Thelma Mansfield =

Irish television presenter and artist

- Born: 1949 (age 76–77)
- Occupations: Television presenter; artist
- Years active: 1965 - 1999
- Website: http://www.thelmamansfield.ie

Thelma Mansfield (born 1949) is an Irish television presenter and artist who worked mainly with RTÉ television. She started out at RTÉ in 1965 as a continuity announcer.

From 1986–97, she co-hosted the RTÉ 1 afternoon show Live at 3 with Derek Davis.

Since retiring in the late 1990s, Mansfield has concentrated on painting and regularly exhibits her work. She married photographer John "Johnny" Morris, son of Michael Morris, 3rd Baron Killanin and twin brother of Mouse Morris. They have two sons.
