= Sheana Keane =

- Born: 27 May 1975 (age 50)
- Education: Master's degree in psychology
- Alma mater: University College Dublin
- Occupation: Television presenter
- Employer: RTÉ
- Known for: The Afternoon Show, The Health Squad, Late Lunch Live
- Spouse: Jonathan Forrest
- Children: 2

Sheana Keane (born 27 May 1975) is an Irish presenter on Raidió Teilifís Éireann (RTÉ).

== Personal life ==
She was educated at University College Dublin and holds a master's degree in psychology. She is married to Jonathan Forrest, managing director of Cybercom, and they have two children.

== Career ==
She presented the programmes Health Squad (2001–2006) and The Afternoon Show (2004–2005; 2006–2010).

Her broadcasting career began as a researcher on Wanderlust (RTÉ's Internet-based blind date programme) in 2001 and as a researcher and broadcaster on the daytime talk show Open House in 2002.

One of RTÉ's new generation of "rising stars", Keane's interviewing skills stem from her commercial background as a Change Management Consultant.

In 2014, after almost four years since presenting The Afternoon Show on RTÉ One, Keane reportedly is set to begin presenting Late Lunch Live on TV3 in a bid to improve ratings by bosses. It is unclear whether this will be temporary or permanent.
