= Live at 3 =

- Genre: Light entertainment
- Presented by: Thelma Mansfield; Derek Davis
- Country of origin: Ireland
- Original language: English

Production
- Production locations: Studio 5, RTÉ Television Centre, Donnybrook, Dublin 4
- Camera setup: Multi-camera
- Running time: 60 minutes

Original release
- Network: RTÉ 1
- Release: 29 September 1986 – 30 May 1997

Related
- Good Afternoon; PM Live

Live at 3 is a popular Irish afternoon chat show broadcast live on RTÉ 1. Presented by Thelma Mansfield and Derek Davis, it was RTÉ's flagship daytime show from 1986 until 1997. Ireland's most successful Daytime TV programme, reaching audiences of 300,000 at times, both young and old. The Monday edition was produced for older viewers and evolved from "Going Strong" presented by Bunny Carr. Its theme music was 'Arlecchino' by Rondò Veneziano.

== History ==
In 1986 RTÉ had a new corporate brand for both of its stations RTÉ 1 and RTÉ 2. As a result of this the daytime service split its programming between adults and children. Good Afternoon, broadcast on RTÉ 1 for several years, saw presentation announcer Thelma Mansfield at the helm introducing both children's and adult programmes, she also carried out interviews with musicians and other well known people. From 1986 Good Afternoon remained but Ian Dempsey, accompanied by Zig and Zag, took control of introducing children's programming from 4:30pm with a new show called Dempsey's Den. This was preceded by a new magazine-style show called Live at 3, which Director of Television Dick Hill asked producer Noel Smyth to set up and edit.

RTÉ weather presenters, including Gerald Fleming, Evelyn Cusack, Jerry Scully, Dr. Aidan Nulty, Joan Blackburn and Jean Byrne, would make rotational appearances on the show to present the weather forecast.

The series was due to be available on the RTÉ Player in late 2021 to mark "60 Years of Television".

== Production ==
The first edition of Live at 3 was broadcast from Studio 4 in the RTÉ Television Centre at Donnybrook, Dublin 4. This was the first studio to be brought into full operation at RTÉ since the Television Centre was built in 1961. The studio was completed in 1982 but was not fully equipped until four years later.

== Cancellation ==
In 1997, RTÉ decided to axe Live at 3. Thelma Mansfield later revealed she was first made aware of this when she saw a newspaper headline reporting the show's cancellation while stopped at a filling station in the west of Ireland.

Preceded by Good Afternoon	Afternoon programming on Telefís Éireann	Succeeded by PM Live
