= Four Live (Irish TV programme) =

- Starring: Maura Derrane (2010 - 2012)
- Country of origin: Ireland
- Original languages: English; Irish

Production
- Camera setup: Multi-camera

Original release
- Network: RTÉ One
- Release: 2010 – 2012

Related
- The Daily Show

Four Live is a former live flagship daytime programme on RTÉ One. The programme, which was broadcast before The Daily Show, launched on Monday 20 September 2010. It replaced The Afternoon Show.

Four Live was presented by Maura Derrane. With a mix of lifestyle, information and fun items. The show included cookery, fashion, health, fitness, parenting, life-coaching and celebrity gossip. Viewers also had the opportunity to text, phone and e-mail in interjections, views, experiences and opinions.

Four Live ended on 2 March 2012 due to budget cutbacks at RTÉ

== Presenter ==
=== Maura Derrane ===
Derrane started her career on Nuacht TG4 as a reporter. She then moved TV3 News as a reporter and then on to TV3's flagship morning showIreland AM. In 2008, she left TV as she wanted to spend more time with her family; she is married to a Fine Gael TD. During this time she presented a TV3 programme called Living with Murder and a TG4 reality TV programme called Feirm Factor. On 5 October 2009 she began presenting The Afternoon Show, which was then replaced with 4 Live.

Preceded by The Afternoon Show	Afternoon programming on Telefís Éireann; 2010 - 2012	Succeeded by Today
