= RTÉ Player =

Irish demand video service

- Logo used since 2018

- RTÉ Player homepage
- Developer: Raidió Teilifís Éireann (RTÉ)
- Initial release: 21 April 2009 (Flash Player)
- Stable release: 5 December 2018 (HTML5)
- Operating system: Windows; macOS; Linux; iOS (9.0 or later); Android (5.0 or later)
- Platform: Online; Mobile; Samsung TVs (2015 or later); LG TVs (webOS); Sony TVs (Android TV); Philips TVs (Android TV); Panasonic TVs (2017 or later); Saorview Connect; Sky Q; Virgin TV 360; Now TV (Smart Stick); Chromecast; Roku; Apple TV
- Available in: English, Irish
- Type: Television catch-up On demand video service Recording Studio
- License: TV licence
- Website: www.rte.ie/player

RTÉ Player is an on demand video service provided by Irish public media broadcaster RTÉ.

The service provides live and recorded RTÉ television programs, and content exclusive to the player as well as content from other international broadcasters.

The player is available in two formats: one for the Republic of Ireland and Northern Ireland, and another for international audiences. The service provides news, current affairs, entertainment, sport, local and international dramas, and allows viewers to watch programmes from 7 to 21 days after they are broadcast.

== History ==
RTÉ Player was launched on 21 April 2009.

On 2 September 2011, RTÉ announced it would launch a similar platform of its digital radio stations under the name "RTÉ Radio Player".

RTÉ Player was made available to Virgin Media Ireland (previously UPC Ireland) customers through their televisions from 25 May 2012. The service became available to all Sky Ireland customers on 8 July 2016.

In December 2018, a new HTML5 version of the RTÉ Player was revealed featuring content which is exclusive to the online player. The player also hosts additional channels including RTÉ Archives and RTÉ Food. The on-demand service also features content from international broadcasters such as CBS, ABC Australia, arte, Epix, Lionsgate Television and Warner Brothers Television.

== Content ==
More than 200 hours of programmes from all categories of RTÉ broadcast schedule are available on RTÉ Player, most of which are not available to web users outside the island of Ireland. But in January 2010, news, sport and flagship entertainment programming were released to worldwide audiences. According to RTÉ, it is "one of the first broadcasters in the world to launch a comprehensive international online TV catch-up service."

Popular soap operas are available on a 7-day catch-up basis, while home produced entertainment and children's programming is available for 21 days. All RTÉ News and Current Affairs output and RTÉ Sport shows including The Sunday Game, and Monday Night Soccer are available.

In late 2009, RTÉ began putting more and more international programming on RTÉ Player. When initially launched RTÉ had already secured rights for online streaming for many British and Australian shows such as EastEnders and Home and Away. They then launched some American programmes with exclusive online showings of Seasons 1 and 2 of AMC's Mad Men. Other US shows soon followed such as Grey's Anatomy, Ugly Betty, Lost, Desperate Housewives, and Blue Bloods.

On 14 December 2010, RTÉ Player became available on Sony's PlayStation 3 (PS3) and PSP console.

An app for iPhone and iPad was launched on 22 December 2011. Despite all programs being available on Android via Adobe Flash, only a small selection of programs are available on the iPhone and iPad app.

As part of TV50, RTÉ intends to launch as many as 20 archive programmes each month of 2012 via the RTÉ Player.

== RTÉ Player International ==
On 4 March 2015 RTÉ revamped its RTÉ Player for international audiences. The new service provides over 500 hours of television from Ireland. RTÉ Player International will be a 'freemium' offering which means that audiences will be able to download the app for free and access 100 hours of free content, refreshed daily. The full content offering can be accessed and watched free of advertising for a monthly subscription of €8.99 ($8.99/ £6.99) through the App Store. This subscription helps to cover the cost of securing the international rights for the content and for delivering this premium quality video-on-demand service. The new enhanced RTÉ Player International service is available for iOS devices, supporting iOS7 or greater. The original RTÉ Player service for international audiences remains available on desktop and Android.

== Criticism ==
In 2019, the service came in for criticism for being unreliable and difficult to operate. A freedom of information request in late 2019 revealed that RTÉ received a series of complaints from the public that showed that while commercials seemed to work very well, the actual content frequently didn't play. RTÉ's response to TheJournal.ie stated that the vast majority of people were happy even though they did not state how they knew people were satisfied with the service. TheJournal.ie reported one year later in 2020 that viewers described the service as "an embarrassment", "ridiculous", and the "worst streaming app I've ever used", while RTÉ said it was striving to improve RTÉ Player.

== See also ==
- List of programmes broadcast by Telefís Éireann
- List of streaming media services
