= Celebrity Bainisteoir season 1 =

The first season of Celebrity Bainisteoir was broadcast in Ireland on RTÉ One from 23 March 2008. It was won by the radio and television presenter Marty Whelan who replaced Fianna Fáil TD Mary O'Rourke as bainisteoir of Maryland, County Westmeath, during the series. Whelan's team beat solicitor Gerald Kean's Cork team, Mayfield, in the final at Parnell Park on 16 May that year.

The other six bainisteoirí were television presenter Bazil Ashmawy, model Glenda Gilson, comedian Jon Kenny, journalist and civil rights campaigner Nell McCafferty, panellist Aoibhinn Ní Shúilleabháin and politician-turned bookmaker Ivan Yates.

RTÉ later described the first series of Celebrity Bainisteoir as having "brought the worlds of celebrity and GAA club football crashing together", citing the unexpected early departure of Mary O'Rourke, Nell McCafferty's speech in which she informed her team that the roads were "lined with coffins" when they were young due to the violence in Northern Ireland and Gerald Kean's request for help from celebrity clients who flew in on helicopters as memorable events from the series. The series was produced by Animo Television's Jean Devlin.

== Bainisteoirí ==
Eight bainisteoirí competed in the first season Celebrity Bainisteoir.

=== Bazil Ashmawy ===
Bazil Ashmawy is an actor and co-presenter of the RTÉ Two programme, How Low Can You Go?

=== Glenda Gilson ===
Glenda Gilson is a model and television presenter Gilson described the show as her "most daunting experience" ever, saying she nearly burst into tears on her first day.

=== Gerald Kean ===
Gerald Kean is a celebrity solicitor and socialite who was born in Cork but studied law in Dublin. Kean interrupted his participation in the series to celebrate the confirmation of his eleven-year-old daughter, Kirsten, and to buy her dresses in Los Angeles. However, he also ensured his team were prepared, with yoga sessions, diets and talks with associates of his from the worlds of Premier League football and Gaelic games.

=== Jon Kenny ===
Jon Kenny is an actor and comedian who formed D'Unbelievables with Pat Shortt in the 1990s.

=== Nell McCafferty ===
Nell McCafferty is a veteran journalist, intellectual and civil rights campaigner. She is experienced in the politics of Northern Ireland and of The Troubles, having grown up in Derry during the violent era of the 1970s and has won a Jacobs Award. McCafferty chose to take part in the show following a heart attack and because it was "a completely new [experience] to work exclusively with men, and for them it will be a completely new one working with a woman".

=== Mary O'Rourke ===
Mary O'Rourke is a Fianna Fáil TD for the Longford–Westmeath constituency. She has been Ireland's Minister for Health, Minister for Education and Minister for Public Enterprise and was the leader of Seanad Éireann for five years. Her father and brother were politicians.

=== Aoibhinn Ní Shúilleabháin ===
Aoibhinn Ní Shúilleabháin is the 2005 winner of The Rose of Tralee and a recurring panellist on the topical comedy show The Panel. She described the experience of managing " a gang of lads" as "daunting".

=== Ivan Yates ===
Ivan Yates is a Fine Gael TD-turned bookmaker. He was Ireland's Minister for Agriculture for seven years.

== Clubs ==
Eight clubs competed in the first season of Celebrity Bainisteoir.

=== Ballymanus ===
Ballymanus are based in County Wicklow. They appeared in the RTÉ documentary, Green Fields, filmed in 1984 when the GAA was celebrating its centenary. During Celebrity Bainisteoir they were managed by Bazil Ashmawy, who was mentored by Kevin O'Brien.

=== Crumlin ===
Crumlin have been based in Dublin since 1970, playing both hurling and football. The team's clubhouse is located at Lorcan O'Toole Park on Stanaway Road. Crumlin's footballers were winners of the junior football championship in 2006. During Celebrity Bainisteoir they were managed by Glenda Gilson, who was mentored by Tommy Lyons.

=== Galtee Gaels ===
Galtee Gaels are based in County Limerick. Their players come from a maximum pool of 980 people.The famous limerick footballer Sean McGrath played for the gaels. During Celebrity Bainisteoir they were managed by Jon Kenny, who was mentored by John Ryan.

=== Kiltimagh ===
Kiltimagh have been based in County Mayo since 1888. During Celebrity Bainisteoir they were managed by Aoibhinn Ní Shúilleabháin, who was mentored by Liam McHale. They were led by captain Conor 'The Machineghan' Heneghan, despite the JOE.ie journalist's best efforts, the Mayo side lost out to Mayfield. Speaking afterwards, Heneghan said: "It's a heartbreak almost akin to seeing Mayo lose an All-Ireland. I'm just happy I did myself and the parish proud."

=== Maryland ===
Maryland are based between Athlone and Mullingar in County Westmeath. The team competed in the semi-finals of the Intermediate County Championship in 2007. During Celebrity Bainisteoir they were managed by Mary O'Rourke (later replaced by Marty Whelan), who was mentored by Dessie Dolan. The team won the first series of Celebrity Bainisteoir.

=== Mayfield ===
Mayfield have been based in Cork since 1893. During Celebrity Bainisteoir they were managed by Gerald Kean, who was mentored by Dave Barry. The team were finalists in the first series of Celebrity Bainisteoir.

=== St Mary's Faughanvale ===
St Mary's Faughanvale have been based in Greysteel, County Londonderry since 1933. They purchased their stadium in 1982 and opened their new pitch in 1983. During Celebrity Bainisteoir they were managed by Nell McCafferty, who was mentored by Brian McEniff.

=== Taghmon-Camross ===
Taghmon-Camross are based in County Wexford. During Celebrity Bainisteoir they were managed by Ivan Yates, who was mentored by Billy Dodd.

== Tournament ==
The tournament itself involved four quarter-finals, two semi-finals and a final.

The first episode featured the quarter-final draw and focused on the reactions of the individual teams upon discovering the identity of their bainisteoir. The second episode featured the first quarter-final between Mayfield, managed by Gerald Kean, and Crumlin, managed by Glenda Gilson. Gilson's preparations for the match include a dance class and a trip to the 2008 Meteor Awards. Kean's preparations include sending for a number of celebrities, including association footballers Shay Given and Gordon Strachan, to fly into the training ground via helicopter. The match was attended by 4,000 people. The third episode featured the quarter-final between Galtee Gaels, managed by Jon Kenny, and St. Mary's Faughanvale, managed by Nell McCafferty. Kenny prepared for the match by recording a song for his team. The fourth episode featured the quarter-final between Kiltimagh, managed by Aoibhinn Ní Shúilleabháin, and Taghmon-Camross, managed by Ivan Yates. The fifth episode featured the final quarter final between Ballymanus, managed by Bazil Ashmawy, and Maryland, due to have been managed by Mary O'Rourke. Ashmawy became heavily involved with his team but O'Rourke displayed less enthusiasm and eventually grew bored and left the show. O'Rourke was replaced by Marty Whelan who displayed a little more enthusiasm for his role as bainisteoir.

The sixth episode featured the first semi-final, contested by Kean's Mayfield and Ní Shúilleabháin's Kiltimagh. Kean's preparations involve a yoga session and training with established Cork players, James Masters and Donncha O'Connor, in Páirc Uí Rinn, County Cork. Ní Shúilleabháin's preparations include pilates and separate training sessions with John O'Mahoney and the Mayo Ladies football team. The seventh episode featured the second semi-final contested between McCafferty's Faughanvale and Whelan's Maryland. McCafferty's preparation includes training sessions with the former Derry footballer and hurler, Tony Scullion and at the University of Ulster Sports Science clinic. Whelan's preparations include a session with the former Offaly manager Brendan Lowney and a tai chi session.

The eighth episode featured the Celebrity Bainisteoir final which was contested by Whelan's Maryland and Kean's Mayfield teams. The match was played in front of 4,000 spectators at Parnell Park on 16 May 2008 and televised two days later at 18:30. Maryland were leading early on in the first half; however, Mayfield added some points to leave them only two points behind their opponents at half time. The match was won by Maryland in the second half with a score of 2–09 to 1–04.
