= 2005 in Irish television =

The following is a list of events relating to television in Ireland from 2005.

== Events ==
=== March ===
- 3 March – Taoiseach Bertie Ahern opens RTÉ's new studios in London, based at Millbank opposite the British Houses of Parliament.

=== May ===
- 29 May – The RTÉ Annual Report announces the broadcaster has made a €6.8 million operating profit. The report also says that their television channels, RTÉ One and RTÉ Two can be received by 99.1% of the Irish population.

=== October ===
- 4 October – The cable television station City Channel Dublin, part of the City Channel network goes on air.

=== December ===
- 2 December – The Late Late Toy Show is broadcast on RTÉ One, attracting 1.1 million viewers as the most watched programme on Irish television during 2005. It is also the most watched edition of The Late Late Show since Gay Byrne's final show in 1999.

== Debuts ==
=== RTÉ ===
- 11 January – Sergeant Stripes on RTÉ Two (2003–2004)
- 13 January – Sonic X on RTÉ Two (2003–2006)
- 17 January – Cyborg 009 on RTÉ Two (2001–2002)
- 26 January – The Colony on RTÉ One (2005)
- 23 May – Lost (2004–2010)
- 13 June – Haughey on RTÉ One (2005)
- 15 June – Gordon the Garden Gnome on RTÉ Two (2005)
- 9 July – Saturday Night with Miriam on RTÉ One (2005–present)
- 5 September – Peppa Pig on RTÉ Two (2004–present)
- 19 September – Dustin's Daily News on RTÉ Two (2005–2007)
- 20 September – Naked Camera on RTÉ Two (2005–2007)
- 26 September – Danny Phantom on RTÉ Two (2004–2007)
- 28 September – Trollz on RTÉ Two (2005)
- 14 November – The Last Furlong (2005)
- Undated – W.I.T.C.H. on RTÉ Two (2004–2006)

=== TV3 ===
- 9 November – The Brendan Courtney Show (2005–2006)

=== TG4 ===
- 7 September – Kitou Scrogneugneu (2002)
- 8 September – The Batman (2004–2008)
- 10 October – GAA... (2005–present)
- Undated – Paisean Faisean (2005)
- Undated – Zombie Hotel (2005–2007)

== Changes of network affiliation ==
Shows	Moved from	Moved to
The Adventures of Blinky Bill	RTÉ Two	TG4
Watership Down	RTÉ Two	TG4

== Ongoing television programmes ==
=== 1960s ===
- RTÉ News: Nine O'Clock (1961–present)
- RTÉ News: Six One (1962–present)
- The Late Late Show (1962–present)

=== 1970s ===
- The Late Late Toy Show (1975–present)
- RTÉ News on Two (1978–2014)
- The Sunday Game (1979–present)

=== 1980s ===
- Dempsey's Den (1986–2010)
- Questions and Answers (1986–2009)
- Fair City (1989–present)
- RTÉ News: One O'Clock (1989–present)

=== 1990s ===
- Would You Believe (1990s–present)
- Winning Streak (1990–present)
- Prime Time (1992–present)
- Nuacht RTÉ (1995–present)
- Fame and Fortune (1996–2006)
- Nuacht TG4 (1996–present)
- Ros na Rún (1996–present)
- A Scare at Bedtime (1997–2006)
- The Premiership/Premier Soccer Saturday (1998–2013)
- Sports Tonight (1998–2009)
- TV3 News (1998–present)
- The View (1999–2011)
- Ireland AM (1999–present)
- Telly Bingo (1999–present)

=== 2000s ===
- Nationwide (2000–present)
- TV3 News at 5.30 (2001–present)
- You're a Star (2002–2008)
- Auld Ones (2003–2007)
- Killinaskully (2003–2008)
- The Clinic (2003–2009)
- The Panel (2003–2011)
- Against the Head (2003–present)
- news2day (2003–present)
- Other Voices (2003–present)
- Tubridy Tonight (2004–2009)
- The Afternoon Show (2004–2010)
- Ryan Confidential (2004–2010)

== Ending this year ==
- April – Proof (2004–2005)
- 4 July – Haughey (2005)
- 1 September – Play it Again Des (2003–2005)
- 19 December – The Last Furlong (2005)
- Undated – Kelly (1989–2005)
- Undated – Paisean Faisean (2005)

== See also ==
- 2005 in Ireland
