= Happy Endings Productions =

Irish television production company

Happy Endings Productions is an Irish entertainment television production company, founded by Dara Ó Briain and Seamus Cassidy in 2003. Their best-known programme is the topical RTÉ comedy show, The Panel, which Ó Briain presented for a number of seasons. They have also produced the Ó Briain-hosted interview show Buried Alive, the comedy special This is Ireland for BBC2 and the 2008 comedy cabaret Smoke and Mirrors, presented by Andrew Maxwell. The company's commissioned work has included two series of Saturday Night With Miriam, an RTÉ chat show presented by Miriam O'Callaghan. As of 2008, the company was developing a sitcom for the UK's Five Channel.
