= Turtle Bunbury =

Irish author, historian, and television presenter

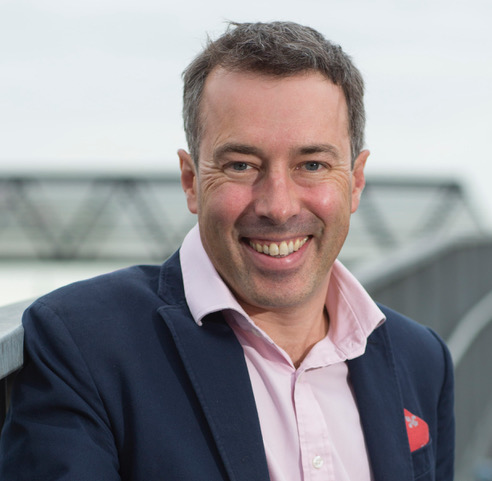
- Turtle Bunbury
- Born: James Alexander Hugh McClintock Bunbury; 21 February 1972 (age 54); Ireland
- Education: Glenalmond College, Scotland; Trinity College, Dublin; University of Groningen, Netherlands
- Occupations: Author, historian, television presenter
- Known for: Vanishing Ireland
- Spouse: Ally Bunbury
- Parent: Baron Rathdonnell (father)

James Alexander Hugh McClintock Bunbury (born 21 February 1972), known as Turtle Bunbury, is an Irish author, historian, and television presenter. He has published a number of books such as the Vanishing Ireland series, Ireland's Forgotten Past, Easter Dawn -The 1916 Rising, The Glorious Madness (short-listed for Best Irish-published Book of the Year 2014) and 1847 – A Chronicle of Genius, Generosity & Savagery.

== Career ==
Bunbury is the third son of Thomas McClintock-Bunbury, 5th Baron Rathdonnell and Jessica Harriet, daughter of George Gilbert Butler, of Scatorish, Bennettsbridge, County Kilkenny (brother of the essayist Hubert Butler). He was raised at Lisnavagh House, Rathvilly, County Carlow and received his early education locally and at Castle Park School in Dublin. He later studied at Glenalmond College, Perthshire, Scotland, before going on to Trinity College, Dublin and the University of Groningen in the Netherlands.

From 1996 to 1998 he lived in Hong Kong, working as a freelance correspondent with the South China Morning Post and Business News Indochina.

Bunbury was a co-presenter of The Genealogy Roadshow on RTÉ television in 2011 and 2014. He also presented Hidden Histories on Newstalk Radio in 2013. He co-wrote the 2008 documentary John Henry Foley: Sculptor of the Empire. He has also appeared on BBC1's Wogan's Ireland, the RTÉ series, Great Lighthouses of Ireland, and episodes of the American version and Irish version of the Who Do You Think You Are? TV series.

BBC History Magazine described him as "a skilled storyteller", and novelist Marjorie Quarton described Bunbury as being "one of the most versatile authors of his generation … a serious author with a light touch in writing".

His work has appeared in National Geographic Traveler, Daily Beast, The Australian, The Guardian and the Irish Times.

In 2019, Bunbury began a collaboration with Iarnród Éireann and Flahavan's for a project called ‘Past Tracks,’ an exhibition of historic panels that went on semi-permanent display in several railway stations around Ireland.

Bunbury has also written and performed in a series of podcasts covering topics from his books, and various aspects of history and culture. Examples include Waterways Through Time, commissioned by Waterways Ireland, which won the Bronze medal for best podcast at the 2023 Digital Media Awards in Ireland, and Behind the Guinness Gates, commissioned by the Guinness Storehouse.

Turtle Bunbury is married to the novelist Ally Bunbury with whom he lives in County Carlow.

== Vanishing Ireland ==
In 2001 Bunbury began work on the Vanishing Ireland project with photographer James Fennell. The project produced four books, and a review in the Irish Independent of the first book noted how it was "written with sympathy, understanding and gentle humour". Three of the books were short-listed for Best Irish-Published Book of the Year at the Irish Book Awards.

== Works ==
- The Landed Gentry & Aristocracy of Co. Kildare (Irish Family Names, 2004) ISBN 0953848531
- The Landed Gentry & Aristocracy of Co. Wicklow (Irish Family Names, 2005) ISBN 0953848574
- Living in Sri Lanka (Thames & Hudson, 2006), with James Fennell. ISBN 0500512876
- Vanishing Ireland (Hodder Headline, 2006), with James Fennell. ISBN 034092277X
- The Irish Pub (Thames & Hudson, 2008) with James Fennell. ISBN 0500514283
- Dublin Docklands – An Urban Voyage (Montague, 2009). ISBN 0955815517
- Vanishing Ireland 2 (Hodder Headline, 2009), with James Fennell. ISBN 0340920270
- Sporting Legends of Ireland (Mainstream, 2010) with James Fennell. ISBN 1845965027
- Vanishing Ireland 3 (Hachette, 2011), with James Fennell. ISBN 1444733052
- Dublin from the Etihad Skyline (GAA Museum, 2012), ISBN 978-0957280502.
- Vanishing Ireland 4 (Hachette, 2013), with James Fennell. ISBN 1444733060
- The Glorious Madness – Tales of the Irish & the Great War (Gill & Macmillan, 2014) ISBN 978-07171-6234-5
- Easter Dawn – The 1916 Rising (Mercier Press, 2015). ISBN 978-1781-172582
- 1847 – A Chronicle of Genius, Generosity & Savagery (Gill, 2016). ISBN 9780717168347
- Adare Manor : The Renaissance of an Irish Country House (Adare Manor Publishing, 2019) ISBN 9781527246706
- Ireland's Forgotten Past (Thames & Hudson, 2020) ISBN 9780500022535
- The Irish Diaspora: Tales of Emigration, Exile and Imperialism (Thames & Hudson, 2021) ISBN 9780500022528
- The Centenary of Naas Racecourse (Turtle Bunbury Histories, 2023) ISBN 9781399968263
