= Saturday Night with Miriam =

- Genre: Chat Show
- Presented by: Miriam O'Callaghan
- Country of origin: Ireland
- Original language: English
- No. of seasons: 11

Production
- Executive producer: Larry Masterson
- Running time: 60 minutes

Original release
- Network: RTÉ One
- Release: 9 July 2005 – 2017

Saturday Night with Miriam was an Irish talk show first broadcast on RTÉ One in the summer of 2005. The show ran for six weeks as a summer filler, and was overseen by Miriam O'Callaghan, a co-presenter of Prime Time.

== Format ==
Saturday Night with Miriam, airs during summer months on RTÉ One when programmes such as The Late Late Show and the former Saturday night talk show Tubridy Tonight are off air. The show has a wide variety of guests, often including musicians, who usually perform on the show. The Duckworth Lewis Method made their television debut on Saturday Night with Miriam in 2009's season opener.

== History ==
The first two series were pre-recorded show was broadcast on Saturday nights after the main evening news, lasting approximately 60 minutes. In the 2007 series, the programme began to broadcast live.

The show's first guests included Charlie McCreevy, Paul Brady, D. J. Carey and Ray D'Arcy. The programme received thirty-six percent of the adult audience.

The series was also run in summer 2006 and a third series ran in 2007.

The fourth series in 2008 was very popular and achieved a forty percent audience . People such as Mary Coughlan, Enda Kenny, Cherie Blair and Jade Goody appeared on the series.

In 2009, the series returned for a fifth series, with RTÉ making the announcement on 4 June 2009. This happened after it was announced that she would not be the new host of The Late Late Show. O'Callaghan also got her first radio programme, filling in for Eamon Dunphy on Miriam Meets.... Newly elected politician George Lee was one of the first guests of the fifth series. The final episode of the fifth series received 422,000 viewers, a 35% audience share.

O'Callaghan confirmed that the series would return in 2013.

The show returned in the summer of 2014 for another series, running from 5 July until 23 August 2014 on RTÉ One. The 2014 season was pre-recorded on Fridays.

The show returned in the summer of 2015 for another series commencing 20 June 2015 and ran until 8 August 2015 on RTÉ One.

In 2018 Miriam announced that the show would take a break and would not return for a new series in 2018. This was down to the busy schedule Miriam had for the summer of 2018, with the then upcoming coverage on RTÉ of the referendum on abortion, coverage of Pope Francis visit to Ireland and Miriam's involvement in a documentary. However she did say in an interview with the RTÉ Guide that the show would return in the summer of 2019.

In May 2019, it was confirmed that Saturday Night with Miriam would not be returning to the RTÉ One schedules that autumn, as Miriam would be filling in for Seán O'Rourke on his RTÉ Radio 1 mid-morning show during the summer.

== Guests ==
=== Series 3 ===
Date	Guests	Link
16 June 2007	Andrea Corr, Bertie Ahern, Bernard Dunne, Kristina Grimes	
23 June 2007	Samantha Mumba, Jack O'Connor, Keith Barry, Louis Walsh	
30 June 2007	Al Green, Gerry Conlon & Paddy Hill, Kellie Shirley, Jason Byrne & Pamela Flood, Brendan O'Carroll	
7 July 2007	Blathnaid McKenna & Sarah Morrissey, Mario Rosenstock, Marguerite Bouniol, Marie-Marguerite Opalka & Ralph Riegel, Packie Bonner & Ray Houghton	
14 July 2007	Amanda Brunker, Brendan O'Connor, Dáithí Ó Sé & Brian Ormonde, Nadine Coyle, Mary Robinson	
21 July 2007	Shayne Ward, Boy George & Dinah O'Dowd, Ronnie Drew	
28 July 2007	Linda Martin, Diarmuid Gavin, Paddy Power, Tracy Pigott, Gráinne Seoige & Barry Geraghty, Pádraig Harrington	
4 August 2007	Craig Doyle, Kathryn Feeney, Luzveminda O'Sullivan & Sheila O'Hanrahan Lawlor, Sinéad O'Connor, Mícheál Ó Muircheartaigh & Jimmy Magee	

=== Series 4 ===
The 2008 series got an average viewing audience of 425,000.

Date	Guests	Link
7 June 2008	Mary Coughlan, Kevin Hiller, Alan Gray, Brian McDermott & Ben Cunningham, Jessie Buckley, Louis Walsh & Brendan O'Connor, Red Hurley	
14 June 2008	Jack Charlton & John Aldridge, Bláthnaid Ní Chofaigh, Victoria Smurfit, George Lee, Eddie Hobbs & David McWilliams	
21 June 2008	Boyzone, Jade Goody, Terry O'Quinn, Gerald Kean, Bazil Ashmawy & Ivan Yates	
28 June 2008	Peter Kelly, Phil Coulter & Geraldine Brannigan, Bill O'Herlihy, Liam Brady, Johnny Giles & Eamonn Dunphy, Robert O'Neill	
5 July 2008	Enda Kenny, Sonia O'Sullivan, Darren Sutherland & Eileen O'Keeffe, Cherie Blair	
12 July 2008	Bibi Baskin, Jennifer Maguire & Evelyn Cusack, Johnny Murtagh & Orla Murtagh, Larry Gogan, Lawrence McKeown, Mary Doyle & Raymond McCartney	
19 July 2008	Anne Doyle, Curtis Stigers, Walter Swift, John Waters, Moya Brennan	

=== Series 5 ===
Date	Guests	Link
20 June 2009	George Lee, Marti Pellow, Amanda Brunker, Claudia Carroll & Marisa Mackle, The Duckworth Lewis Method, Tim O'Rourke & Michael O'Brien	
27 June 2009	Monica Leech, Keith Duffy & Rasher, Michelle Heaton, The Gandhis, Michael and Bernadette Jacobs, Valerie Cox	
4 July 2009	Amy Huberman, Duke Special, Ardal O'Hanlon, Honor Blackman, Brian Crowley	
11 July 2009	Hilda Fay, Clelia Murphy & Ciara O'Callaghan, La Troupe de Mademoiselle Clairette, John Spillane, Steve Collins & Paul Williams, Sophie Ellis-Bextor	
18 July 2009	Pat Shortt, Maxi, Patrick Collison, Wallis Bird, Pat Spillane, Fiona Looney & Marty Morrissey, Kevin Doyle	
25 July 2009	Joe Duffy, Brush Shiels, Bob Carley, Doc Savage & Clint Velour, Lucy Kennedy, Barry McGuigan, Seán Gallagher, Alan Shortt & Jack Sheedy, The High Kings, Ray D'Arcy, Dáithí Ó Sé & Current and Past Roses of Tralee	

Preceded by Kennedy?	Saturday night summer programming on Telefís Éireann; 2005 - present	Succeeded by Incumbent
