= Haughey (TV series) =

- Genre: Documentary
- Created by: Mint Productions
- Directed by: Niamh Sammon
- Country of origin: Ireland
- No. of episodes: 4

Production
- Executive producers: Miriam O'Callaghan and Steve Carson
- Producer: Niamh Sammon
- Running time: 4×52 minutes

Original release
- Network: RTÉ One
- Release: 13 June – 4 July 2005

Haughey is a four-part mini-series documenting the life of former Taoiseach Charles Haughey which was first broadcast on Irish television channel RTÉ One in June and July 2005. It was aired as part of RTÉ's summer schedule that year.

Haughey is a creation of Mint Productions, the company founded by presenter Miriam O'Callaghan and her producer husband Steve Carson, responsible for the 2003's Fine Gael: A Family At War and later the 2008 Bertie documentary series. Unlike Bertie, which saw one of Haughey's successors as Taoiseach, Bertie Ahern, give a "marathon" three-hour interview to the cameras and national television, Haughey could not be persuaded to take a direct part in the series. However, he did give his blessing to the involvement of his family and friends in co-operating with the programme.

== List of episodes ==
1. The Outsider (13 June 2005)
2. Arise and Follow (20 June 2005)
3. The Survivor (27 June 2005)
4. Disclosure (4 July 2005)

== Reception ==
The programme provoked much debate throughout its four-week run, drawing fire from many individuals, some with "already sharpened axes to grind anew". The series was accused of being "too soft" on its subject. Desmond O'Malley thought his screened interview unlike that which actually happened. Some of the interviewees were criticised as viewing their part "through the distorting mirror of bitterness or loyalty", whilst "others bore grudges, others were staking their positions for posterity". The series was noted for the wry contributions of former secretary to the government Dermot Nally, the contrasting observations of Haughey's son Seán with those of his daughter Eimear, and the performance of Pádraig Flynn before the camera, which was described as "utterly extraordinary". Questions were, however, raised if a better programme could have been made after Haughey's death when people would feel freer to speak.

=== Quotes from the papers ===
- "'Haughey' is a whale of a story, told with a fine energy in this production", Sunday Independent
- "'Haughey' was gripping television from beginning to end...it will be an important source for the history of Fianna Fáil in the Haughey period", Sunday Independent
- "An extraordinary story...neither a black-and-white morality tale nor a rehabilitation", The Irish Times
