= Quarton =

Quarton may refer to:

- Emily Quarton (born 1984), Canadian weightlifter
- Enguerrand Quarton (or Charonton), 15th-century French painter
- Harold B. Quarton (1888–1981), American diplomat
- Marjorie Quarton (born 1930), Irish novelist
- Metropolitan Parkway (Detroit area)
