= Aoibhinn Ní Shúilleabháin =

Irish academic, science communicator and broadcaster

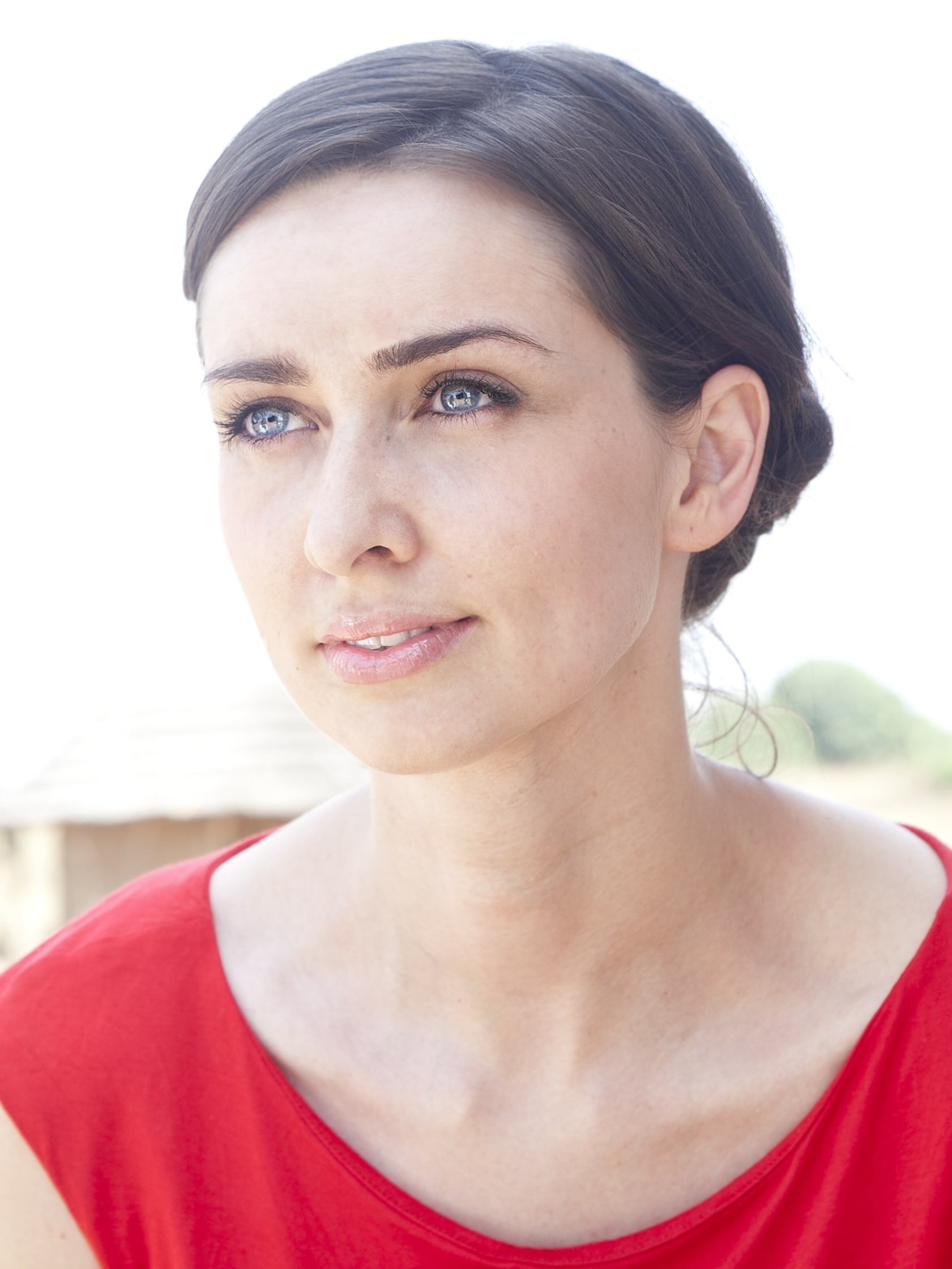
- Ní Shúilleabháin in 2012
- Born: 25 October 1983 (age 42); Carnacon, near Castlebar, County Mayo, Ireland
- Occupations: Lecturer, researcher, broadcaster
- Years active: 2005 to present
- Known for: Science communication, chairing national forum on biodiversity, Rose of Tralee win
- Spouse: Carlos Diaz (m. 2017)
- Children: 3

Academic background
- Education: University College Dublin; Trinity College Dublin
- Thesis: Developing mathematics teachers' pedagogical content knowledge through lesson study : a multiple case study at a time of curriculum change (2015)
- Doctoral advisor: Aidan Geery (Dr.)
- Influences: Richard Feynman

Academic work
- Discipline: Theoretical physics, mathematics pedagogy
- Institutions: Dublin City University
- Main interests: Science communication, teaching of maths and science

Aoibhinn Ní Shúilleabháin (pronounced [ˈiːvʲən̠ʲ n̠ʲiː ˈhuːl̠ʲəwaːnʲ]; born 25 October 1983) is an Irish academic, teacher, broadcaster and high-profile science communicator. She also won the Rose of Tralee contest in 2005 and toured internationally as the lead singer of an Irish traditional music band. In 2022, she was appointed to chair a national forum on biodiversity loss, presenting its report to Taoiseach Leo Varadkar in April 2023, and presenting on the topic to a committee of the UN General Assembly later that month.

== Early life and education ==
Ní Shúilleabháin is a native of the village of Carnacon near Ballyglass, County Mayo. Her parents were teachers, her father, Art, from County Galway, being the principal of Carnacon National School, and her mother, Maire, vice-principal of a Gaelscoil in Castlebar. She was the eldest of a family of six, with five brothers. She has credited her success and interest in some aspects of maths and science to a good teacher of maths in primary school, and to a secondary school science teacher, Mr McMonagle. She grew up speaking both English and Irish, and remained a Gaeilgeoir, still thinking partly in Irish as an adult.

She entered University College Dublin (UCD) with an Entrance Scholarship for high marks in the Leaving Certificate. She received further scholarships from Bord na Gaeilge, which included residence for her first two years at UCD in an Irish-speaking hall on campus, and a requirement to organise Irish-language campus events. During her studies, she spent the summer of 2004 working at CERN in Geneva. She graduated with a first-class honours degree in Theoretical Physics in 2005.

== Academic career and science communication ==
Ní Shúilleabháin obtained funding for a four-year masters and doctorate in Biological Mathematics at University College London but having commenced that, she switched plan to secondary teacher education. She pursued further studies, securing a certificate in "English Language Teaching for Adults" in 2007. and a Postgraduate Diploma in Education at Trinity College Dublin.

She worked from 2008 to 2011 as a student teacher, then a post-primary school teacher, of mathematics, physics and science, at St Mark's Community School in Tallaght, a DEIS school. She also taught Applied Mathematics, not on the school's curriculum, to interested students outside school hours. She was an active supporter of the Department of Education's "Project Maths" concept of a new way of teaching and examining secondary school maths, and was a member of the department's working group on this for a period, being a "Modular Course Facilitator" from 2010 to 2014.

She left teaching to pursue a Ph.D. in mathematics education, including improving approaches for science and maths teachers, in 2011, winning an Ussher Fellowship to fund multi-year doctoral studies. She described her goals: "Over the next three years I'm hoping to design a new approach to continuous professional development for maths teachers. ... Based on the very successful Japanese model of CPD for teachers, I'm hoping to build a more collaborative approach, with teachers working together in groups to develop their classroom practice. It's common in many countries now but not here." She also critiqued current pressures on teachers of maths and scicence to "teach the exam", talking of her own school education and saying "inspirational teaching and learning is always a distraction from the exam preparation. It shouldn't be that way." From 2011 to 2013, she was "coordinator for Mathematics Pedagogy" in Trinity College's School of Education. She completed the doctorate with the School of Education of Trinity College Dublin in 2014, with her thesis, "Developing mathematics teachers' pedagogical content knowledge through lesson study : a multiple case study at a time of curriculum change", published in 2015; she graduated that year.

In August 2014 she became a faculty member of the School of Mathematics & Statistics at University College Dublin on a temporary assignment, and was hired as a regular lecturer after finalisation of her PhD, researching and lecturing in mathematics and maths education. As of 2021, she is an assistant professor at UCD, and is also director of the B.Sc. Science, Mathematics & Education initial teacher education programme in UCD's College of Science. Nominated by colleagues from across the university, she won a 2020 UCD "Values in Action" award for her role as a socially engaged academic, communicator and leader. In 2025, she moved to Dublin City University as a associate professor in the School of STEM Education, Innovation & Global Studies.

She has mentioned that she maintains her registration as a school teacher and might return to this career at some point.

=== Science communicator ===
Known as a science communicator, especially in Ireland, and citing Richard Feynman as an influence, Ní Shúilleabháin wrote a monthly column for the Science section of The Irish Times in 2016. She had previously co-curated an exhibition at Science Gallery Dublin. She has delivered multiple science-related talks to schools.

In 2016, Silicon Republic listed her as one of the 10 leading female science communicators, within it top "50 Women in Science", and in 2017, she won an award for her Outstanding Communication of STEM from the national scientific research agency SFI. She was co-chairperson of the Women in Mathematics in Ireland Day in 2018.

In 2020 she received a Maths Week Ireland Award for outstanding work in raising public awareness of mathematics.

== Volunteer work and public service ==
Ní Shúilleabháin has been a member of the advisory Leonardo Group at the Science Gallery. She has also been an "ambassador for science" in Ireland 2005–2006, and an "ambassador" for Dublin City of Science 2012. She has also been both a host and a judge (from 2005 to 2010) at the BT Young Scientist and Technology Exhibition.

In 2017, she was invited to be a member of the executive committee of WITS (Women in Technology & Science) Ireland.

She has been a director of Core Youth Services in Inchicore since 2021.

In April 2022 Ní Shúilleabháin was nominated by the then Taoiseach, Mícheál Martin to chair the national Citizens' Assembly on Biodiversity Loss. The recommendations of the Assembly were published in March 2023 and its report was presented to Taoiseach Leo Varadkar in early April 2023; the report and recommendations will be reviewed by the Houses of the Oireachtas and the government, with a response due from government by the end of 2023. She was nominated by the government as Ireland's representative at a special International Mother Earth Day meeting mandated by the General Assembly of the United Nations, the "12th Interactive Dialog of the United Nations General Assembly", and made a brief presentation of the work of the Citizens' Assembly and Ireland's position to the plenary session of this meeting before joining the interactive sessions.

== Media career ==
=== Rose of Tralee 2005 contest ===
Ní Shúilleabháin was crowned the 47th Rose of Tralee on 23 August 2005, in a ceremony broadcast by RTÉ Television. Ní Shúilleabháin was considered by bookmakers to be an early favourite to win the Rose of Tralee contest and, as a result of a rules change, was the first Mayo Rose as final contestant in the history of the competition. She spent much of the following year on causes related to the win. She has stated that she owes much of her later media career to the opportunities opened up by her win.

=== Broadcaster, 2005 to 2021 ===
Ní Shúilleabháin has worked as a broadcaster and host since her Rose of Tralee win. In 2007 she was a member of The Panel on RTÉ Two and participated in the 2008 season of Celebrity Bainisteoir on RTÉ One, managing a Gaelic football team from Kiltimagh in her native Mayo. In 2009 she hosted the weekly Irish music show The Reel Deal on RTÉ. She also hosted regularly on Dublin's Irish language radio station, Raidió na Life, and stood in for Síle Seoige on Newstalk in 2011, interviewing Lee Child and Pixie Lott, for example.

In 2012, she visited Uganda to report on Trócaire's work there.

She has been a presenter of two flagship science programmes on RTÉ, The Science Squad from 2012 to 2014, and, from 2015 until 2021, 10 Things to Know About..., both with Jonathan McCrea and Kathriona Devereux. She had previously stated, in 2009, "Some day I would love to present a Tomorrow's World-style, science-based TV programme."

In 2013, she hosted her own RTÉ Radio 1 lifestyle series Aoibhinn and Company as a summer replacement for Miriam O'Callaghan's Sunday show Miriam Meets.

She presented the RTÉ travel show Getaways with Joe Lindsay for two series and presented the Fleadh Cheoil programme, with John Creedon, from 2014 to 2018.

== Music and writing ==
Ní Shúilleabháin spent many years as a member of Comhaltas Ceoltóirí Éireann, and won awards for sean-nós singing, while also writing songs; she also won awards for poetry and short-story writing. In 2007 and 2008, she toured the United States, Japan, and Europe as the lead singer of Ragús, a traditional Irish music band.

== Recognition ==
In addition to appointments, Ní Shúilleabháin was named as one of the "Top 100 Women in Science, Maths and Engineering" by Silicon Republic in 2014, as one of the "40 under 40 European Young Leaders" by the Friends of Europe in 2017, and on the "Top 100 Women of 2021" list by the Irish Examiner in 2021.

== Publications ==
Ní Shúilleabháin is one of four co-compilers of a 2012 science "short facts" book, A Neutron Walks Into a Bar, published in aid of charity. She is co-author of a paper for the 2014 annual conference of the Association for Teacher Education in Europe, "Investigating Representations of Ratio among Prospective Mathematics Teachers: a Study of Student-Teachers and Students of Mathematics in an Irish University".

== Personal life ==
Ní Shúilleabháin was in a relationship with broadcaster Ryan Tubridy from 2009 to 2014. She married Carlos Diaz in a private ceremony in 2017. As of 2020, they have two sons.

She has noted her continued interest in Irish culture and status as a Gaeilgeoir, stating "for me, Irish culture is so important. I dance, I play, I speak the language". After living in Monkstown for more than 5 years, she moved to Inchicore in 2016.

In September 2020, Ní Shúilleabháin spoke about her experience of being harassed and stalked, even beyond Dublin, over a two-year period, from 2015 to 2017, by Hans-Benjamin Braun, a fellow professor at UCD. Despite many logged reports to the university's human resources function, and support from multiple colleagues, the problem continued and ultimately a report was made to the Garda Siochana. A prosecution for harassment eventually followed, in 2019, and the harasser was barred from making any contact with Ní Shúilleabháin for five years. Her speaking out led to changes in UCD policy on sexual harassment and violence and to changes to national policies on this subject at Irish Higher Education Institutions. She eventually received a formal apology from the acting president of UCD in 2022; the perpetrator of the harassment had meantime left the university.

Preceded by Orla O'Shea	Rose of Tralee; August 2005 – August 2006	Succeeded by Kathryn Anne Feeney
