= 1969 Cork Junior Hurling Championship =

Irish hurling competition

- Teams: 7
- Champions: Kanturk (1st title)
- Runners-up: Mayfield

The 1969 Cork Junior Hurling Championship was the 72nd staging of the Cork Junior Hurling Championship since its establishment by the Cork County Board.

The final was played on 30 November 1969 at the Castletownroche Grounds, between Kanturk and Mayfield, in what was their first ever meeting in the final. Kanturk won the match by 3-07 to 1-10 to claim their first ever championship title.

== Results ==
=== Final ===
30 November 1969 Final	Kanturk	3-07 - 1-10	Mayfield	Castletownroche Grounds
				Referee: D O'Brien (Cobh)
