= Mackle =

Mackle (Irish: Ó Machail or Ó Maicill) is a Scottish surname. It comes from the Middle Scots "Meikill" (also spelled "Meikle" or "Mekill"), meaning "big, large". Notable people with the surname include:

- Barbara Jane Mackle (born 1948), American heiress and kidnapping victim
- Damian Mackle (born 1985), Northern Irish professional wrestler
- Mackle Brothers, American land developers
- Marisa Mackle (born c. 1973), Irish novelist
