= Celebrity Bainisteoir =

- Created by: Animo Television; Kite Entertainment
- Country of origin: Ireland
- No. of seasons: 5

Production
- Running time: 60 minutes

Original release
- Network: RTÉ One
- Release: 23 March 2008 – 2012

Celebrity Bainisteoir is a prime-time reality programme created by Fiona Looney and first broadcast in 2008 by RTÉ.

It involved a number of celebrities competing against each other as a Gaelic football team coach. The title derived from the Irish word for manager: bainisteoir [ˈbˠanʲəʃtʲoːɾʲ].

The series ran successfully for five years. It was axed in 2013 and replaced with Ireland's Fittest Family.

== Description ==
In the series, eight non-sporting Irish 'celebrities' (see references) take the place of Gaelic Athletic Association bainisteoirí and compete against one another as the managers of intermediate-level Gaelic football teams. Each contestant managed a club from his or her home county. According to an RTÉ executive: 'Celebrity Bainisteoir is a refreshingly Irish take on reality television. Clashing the local passions of grass-roots GAA with the very different worlds of our eight celebrity team leaders, it looks like there'll be drama both on and off the pitch.' As described by one of the producers of the programme:

"Celebrity Bainisteoir is about showcasing and celebrating the passion, skill and commitment of grassroots GAA, but we're having a bit fun with it by throwing celebrities into the mix. At its heart it's a uniquely Irish family entertainment programme. For the clubs it's a rare chance to showcase club football to a national audience in an entertainment programme, while for the celebrities it's a chance to learn a brand new skill."

== 2008 series ==
=== Contestants ===
Contestant	County	Club	Notes
Baz Ashmawy	Wicklow	Ballymanus	TV Presenter
Glenda Gilson	Dublin	Crumlin	TV Presenter and Model
Jon Kenny	Limerick	Galtee Gaels	Comedian, Actor and Musician
Gerald Kean	Cork	Mayfield	Solicitor and Bon Vivant
Nell McCafferty	Derry	St. Mary's, Faughanvale	Journalist, Playwright, Civil Rights Campaigner and Feminist
Aoibhinn Ní Shúilleabháin	Mayo	Kiltimagh	Ex-Rose of Tralee and TV Presenter
Mary O'Rourke/Marty Whelan	Westmeath	Maryland	Former TD and Government Minister
Ivan Yates	Wexford	Taghmon-Camross	Bookmaker and Radio Presenter

The eight bainisteoirí and the teams they managed in the 2008 series are:

- Baz Ashmawy, television presenter from shows such as How Low Can You Go? and (after Celebrity Bainisteoir) Fáilte Towers, managed Ballymanus from Wicklow. The Irish Times reported him managing his team while wearing 'nicely polished footwear'
- Glenda Gilson, a model and TV presenter called 'one of Ireland's most photographed faces', managed the Crumlin club from Dublin
- Jon Kenny, actor, comedian, and musician, managed Galtee Gaels of Limerick. As part of his strategy, Kenny brought in a group of traditional Irish musicians to teach the team a song
- Gerald Kean, solicitor and 'bon vivant', managed Cork club side Mayfield
- Nell McCafferty, journalist, playwright, civil rights campaigner and feminist, managed St Mary's Faughanvale from Derry. At one point she said she asked herself 'what it would be like to work exclusively with men,' and said it was 'so far, extremely difficult'
- Aoibhinn Ní Shúilleabháin, former Rose of Tralee and regular member of The Panel on RTÉ Two, managed the Kiltimagh club of Mayo
- Mary O'Rourke, Fianna Fáil TD for Longford–Westmeath, managed Maryland of Westmeath. She was replaced during the competition by television host Marty Whelan
- Ivan Yates, bookmaker and former Fine Gael politician, managed the Taghmon-Camross from Wexford

The contestants were each assigned an experienced mentor to assist them in training and managing their respective teams, but were responsible for team training and tactics. Glenda Gilson recounted her experiences as being extremely difficult, making her cry on the first day. She said 'I wasn't able for it at all and felt I was like a schoolgirl on a street corner trying to be cool in front of boys' and called the experience the most difficult of her life.

=== Tournament ===
The games featured in Celebrity Bainisteoir programme were officially sanctioned by the GAA and consisted of four quarter-finals, two semi-finals and the final. The competitive athletic aspect of the programme was taken seriously by club supporters. For a semi-final encounter with the Mayo team, for example, supporters from Cork urged their fellow Corkonians to attend by rallying 'People of Cork, your city and your county need your support again...If you care about Cork, You'll be there.'

The final tournament was a 'thrilling encounter' played at Parnell Park in Donnycarney, Dublin on Friday 16 May in front of over four thousand spectators. Of this final competition, one source praised "the much-anticipated meeting marked the conclusion of a tournament that captured the public imagination by combining the raw passion of the GAA grassroots with the glamorous world of celebrity." The captain for Maryland on the day was David Martin. The Maryland GAA team from Westmeath, under the direction of their replacement bainisteoir Marty Whelan, triumphed over the Mayfield GAA from Cork by 8 points the team that were led by Gerald Kean. Maryland then went on to win the Westmeath Intermediate Championship in 2008.

== Christmas Challenge ==
Broadcast on 28 December 2008, this special edition sees Marty Whelan's winning Maryland team from the first series take on Patrick Kielty's London champions Tír Chonaill Gaels.

Tír Chonaill Gaels won this game 1–06 to Maryland's 0-07.

== 2009 series ==
=== Contestants ===
Contestant	County	Club	Notes
Ray D'Arcy	Kildare	Rathangan	Radio Presenter
John Waters	Roscommon	St. Michael's, Cootehall	Journalist
Katherine Lynch	Leitrim	St. Patrick's, Dromahair	Comedian and actress
Emma O'Driscoll	Limerick	St. Patrick's	Children's TV presenter on The Den
George Hook	Dublin	Cuala	Rugby analyst
Andrea Roche	Tipperary	Rockwell Rovers	Model
John McGuire	Kerry	Sneem	TV presenter
Derek Davis	Down	Glasdrumman	TV presenter

== Series 3 ==
Contestant	County	Club	Notes
Mairead Farrell	Dublin	Ballymun Kickhams	Radio & TV Presenter
Bláthnaid Ní Chofaigh	Meath	Nobber	TV Presenter
Nuala Carey	Offaly	Shannonbridge/Clonmacnoise	Weather woman on RTÉ
Andrew Maxwell	Fermanagh	Irvinestown	Comedian
Derek Burke	Kerry	Castleisland Desmonds	Singer with Crystal Swing
Gavin Duffy	Louth	Roche Emmets	TV Personality/Businessman
Breffny Morgan	Galway	Kilconly	Apprentice Contestant
Franc (Peter Kelly)	Cork	Fermoy	Wedding Designer

== Series 4 ==
There was a fourth series in 2011. The eight celebrities were Dana, PJ Gallagher, Gillian Quinn, Tommy Fleming, Amanda Brunker, Paul Gogarty, Brenda Donohue and Tony Cascarino. Majella O'Donnell managed Lissan after Dana left to contest the 2011 Irish presidential election. Cascarino ultimately beat Gogarty, with extra-time being needed in the final for the first time in Celebrity Bainisteoir.

== Series 5 ==
=== Contestants ===
Contestant	County	Club	Notes
Rozanna Purcell	Longford	Newtown Cashel GAA Club	Model and former Miss Ireland. A native of Clonmel she will manage Cashel GAA club from Co Longford.
Pippa Ormond	Donegal	Naomh Brid GAA Club	Model and wife of fellow contestant Brian Ormond
Jessica Lawlor	Cork	Ballinora GAA Club	Wife of Aston Villa soccer player and former Irish international Stephen Ireland
Calum Best	Mayo	Moy Davitts GAA Club, Foxford	Son of George Best
Paddy Doherty	Dublin	Scoil Uí Chonaill GAA Club Clontarf	
Brian Ormond	Westmeath	St Mary's GAA Club, Rochfordbridge	TV presenter and singer. Husband of fellow contestant Pippa Ormond
Richie Hayes	Waterford	Tramore GAA Club	Singer and finalist on The Voice of Ireland. Bainisteoir of Tramore GAA.
Mary Byrne	Carlow	St. Patrick's GAA Club, Tullow	Singer who rose to fame on The X Factor UK. Bainisteoir of Tullow GAA.

=== Quarter-finals ===
- Moy Davitts Calum Best ----v---- Paddy Doherty
- St Patrick's Tullow, Mary Byrne (singer) ----v---- Richie Hayes
- Brian Ormond ----v---- Pippa Ormond
- Jessica Lawlor ----v---- Roz Purcell

=== Semi-finals ===
- Calum Best V Mary Byrne
- Roz Purcell V Pippa Ormond

=== Final ===
- Roz Purcell V Calum Best
- Venue: Parnell Park, Dublin
- Date: Friday 26 October 2012
- Winner: Calum Best
