= Who Do You Think You Are? (Irish TV series) =

- Genre: Documentary
- Directed by: Ingrid Gargan; Imogen Murphy; Mark Warren; Gerry Hoban
- Narrated by: Arthur Riordan
- Composer: Mark Sayer-Wade
- Country of origin: Ireland
- No. of seasons: 3
- No. of episodes: 18

Production
- Executive producers: Steve Carson; Miriam O'Callaghan
- Producers: Isobel Nolan; Marie Eschenbach
- Editor: Gerry Hoban
- Running time: 60 minutes
- Production company: Mint Productions

Original release
- Network: RTÉ One
- Release: 15 September 2008 – 14 October 2018

Related
- British version of Who Do You Think You Are?

Who Do You Think You Are? is an Irish genealogy documentary series that first aired on RTÉ One in 2008. It is made by the production company Mint. In each episode, a celebrity goes on a journey to trace their lineage through a family tree. The series is based on the original version of the franchise, broadcast by the BBC in the United Kingdom. A third series started on 9 September 2018 with six new episodes.

== Notable discoveries ==
In the first episode, RTÉ news reporter Charlie Bird discovered his great-great-grandfather had been involved in the Battle of the Nile (1798) and served under Admiral Nelson himself, whilst Bird also discovered that his grandfather was a bigamist.

In the fifth episode, RTÉ presenter Pamela Flood travelled through "19th-century Dublin, taking in red light districts, millionaire solicitors, pawnbrokers, contested wills, illegitimate children and murder". She met historian David Nolan, who has written a history of Corballis House, where her granny was sent to stay; they subsequently discovered she was born out of wedlock.

In the first episode of the second series Ryan Tubridy discovered he was a descendant of Edward III.

== List of episodes ==
=== First series ===
No.	Featured celebrity	Original air date	Details
1	Charlie Bird	15 September 2008	Outline (archive link)
2	Joe Duffy	22 September 2008	Outline (archive link)
3	Dana Rosemary Scallon	29 September 2008	Outline (archive link)
4	Ardal O'Hanlon	6 October 2008	Outline (archive link)
5	Pamela Flood	13 October 2008	Outline (archive link)
6	Linda Martin	20 October 2008	Outline (archive link)

=== Second series ===
No.	Featured celebrity	Original air date	Details
1	Ryan Tubridy	14 September 2009	Outline (archive link)
2	Ivan Yates	21 September 2009	Outline (archive link)
3	Rosanna Davison	28 September 2009	Outline (archive link)
4	Diarmuid Gavin	5 October 2009	Outline (archive link)
5	Fionnula Flanagan	12 October 2009	Outline (archive link)
6	Simon Delaney	19 October 2009	Outline (archive link)

=== Third series ===
No.	Featured celebrity	Original air date	Details
1	Damien Dempsey	9 September 2018	
2	Pat Shortt	16 September 2018	
3	Samantha Power	23 September 2018	
4	Bertie Ahern	30 September 2018	
5	Laura Whitmore	7 October 2018	
6	Adrian Dunbar	14 October 2018	

== Response ==
The first series was criticised for its attempts to mimic the original BBC version. The Irish Independent remarked that: "Our [the Irish nation] pool of talent is so small that the entire country knows exactly what Charlie Bird's lifestyle and personal circumstances are. He is an RTÉ "personality", to be wheeled out in each and every situation ... ad nauseam. He is meant to be a working journalist, not a personality star. It muddies the waters of credibility when supposedly serious journalists become personality acts".

Just before the first episode was broadcast, the Evening Herald ironically compared RTÉ's "awkwardly titled" Where Was Your Family During the Famine? (also broadcast in 2008), in which celebrities traced their family histories back to the darkest period in Ireland's history, to the BBC version.

Mention was also made of the high proportion of RTÉ employees involved in the series (Bird is a news reporter, Duffy a radio broadcaster, Flood a television presenter and Martin appears frequently on RTÉ), with a suggestion that the series ought to be renamed Who Do RTÉ Personalities Think They Are?
