= 1934 Cork Junior Hurling Championship =

Irish hurling competition

- Champions: Liscarroll (1st title)
- Runners-up: Mayfield

The 1934 Cork Junior Hurling Championship was the 38th staging of the Cork Junior Hurling Championship since its establishment by the Cork County Board.

On 6 November 1934, Liscarroll won the championship following a 2–04 to 0–03 defeat of Mayfield in the final at Buttevant Sportsfield. It remains their only championship title.
