= John O'Mahony (disambiguation) =

John O'Mahony (1816–1877) was founder of the Irish Republican Brotherhood.

John O'Mahony may also refer to:

- John O'Mahony (Mayo politician) (1953–2024), Irish Fine Gael politician and manager of the Galway Football Team
- John O'Mahony (Gaelic footballer) (1937–2012), Irish Gaelic footballer
- John O'Mahony (Australian footballer) (born 1931), Australian footballer for Hawthorn
- John O'Mahony (antiquarian) (born 1844), Irish Catholic priest and founder of the Cork Historical and Archaeological Society
- Sean Matgamna (born 1941), also known as John O'Mahony, Trotskyist theorist
- Seán O'Mahony (1864–1934), Sinn Féin politician who represented the South Fermanagh constituency
- John O Mahoney, Irish Gaelic footballer
