= Bertie (TV series) =

2008 Irish TV miniseries

- Genre: Documentary
- Created by: Mint Productions
- Country of origin: Ireland
- No. of episodes: 4

Production
- Running time: 4X60 minutes

Original release
- Network: RTÉ One
- Release: 3 November 2008

Bertie is a four-part miniseries documenting the life of former Taoiseach Bertie Ahern, which began airing on Irish television channel RTÉ One on 3 November 2008. Featuring interviews interwoven with archive footage, the series examined how he led the country and what drove him through his political career.

== Synopsis ==
The series featured contributions from more than 70 people directly linked with Ahern, including family members, schoolfriends and national and international politicians. A central aspect of the programme was a "marathon" interview with Ahern. This interview was conducted shortly after he resigned as Taoiseach and leader of the Fianna Fáil political party in May 2008.

An interview with Tony Blair and contributions from former Cabinet colleagues Charlie McCreevy and Mary O'Rourke were included. His former wife Miriam Ahern and their daughters, Cecelia and Georgina were interviewed. Amongst those declining an interview were Ahern's former partner Celia Larkin. Other Cabinet ministers and junior ministers interviewed included Dermot Ahern, Willie O'Dea, Brian Lenihan, Martin Cullen, Mary Harney, Conor Lenihan and Noel Ahern. Among the other figures interviewed were Des Richardson, Joe Burke, Barry English, David McKenna, Chris Wall, Paddy Duffy and Royston Brady.

Ahern's successor as Taoiseach, Brian Cowen, did not contribute to the programme. Brian Lenihan described Ahern in the documentary as "a man who is utterly consumed by politics and by the exercise of power and he has devoted much of his life to that exercise".

== Production ==
Producer Steve Carson said: "It is a political biography of the Taoiseach while also covering Ireland's political history from 1992, where the Haughey series left off."

Bertie was produced by Mint Productions, who also produced the 2003 programme, Fine Gael: A Family at War and in 2005 Haughey documentary series. also directed by Carson. The show was envisaged and production commenced before Ahern resigned from office.

== List of episodes ==
=== Part one ===
The opening episode was broadcast on 3 November 2008 on RTÉ One. It traced Ahern's life up to the Irish general election in 1989, detailing his years as an accounts clerk in the Mater Hospital, Dublin and his fledgling political career, during which he won a seat in Dáil Éireann in 1977 on his first campaign. The programme outlined the close bond he forged with his party leader at the time, Charles Haughey, whilst serving as Fianna Fáil chief whip.

=== Part two ===
The second episode was broadcast on 10 November 2008, commenced with the 1990 Irish presidential election, in which Mary Robinson became the country's first female president, and follows Ahern's career up to his appointment as leader of the Fianna Fáil political party in 1994.

=== Part three ===
The third episode was broadcast on 17 November 2008, focused on the period from 1994, when Ahern very nearly formed a coalition Government with the Labour. There was also the issue of the briefcase full of cash delivered by Michael Wall to Ahern's constituency office in St Lukes, the previous weekend; the cash was passed on to Celia Larkin who lodged it in an AIB account. From there the focus switched to the 1997 general election, when a minute increase in Fianna Fáil's share of the vote saw him elected Taoiseach for the first time in a coalition Government with the Progressive Democrats. Subsequently, the extensive negotiations in Stormont, leading to the Good Friday Agreement.

=== Part four ===
The fourth episode was broadcast on 24 November 2008, focused on the period from early 1999 up to 2008. The Planning Tribunal, Mahon Tribunal was set up in 1998 to "enquire urgently" into planning affairs in Dublin. Nearly a decade later it would focus on Ahern's missing bank accounts and a pattern of lodgements and withdrawals noticeably larger than his salary between 1993 and 1995. His subsequent attempts to explain this on the RTÉ Six One News in September 2006 and the coining of the term "dig-out" entered Irish political folklore. His performance at the Tribunal and dichotomies in his evidence featured there.

== Reception ==
601,000 watched the first episode, 594,000 watched the second episode and "in excess" of 500,000 were said to have watched the third episode. Ahern was not amongst the viewers, preferring to "listen to others' views on it at this stage" and watch it later when the series has completed broadcasting.

It won an IFTA at the 6th Annual Irish Film & Television Awards 2009.
