= Mint Productions =

Mint Productions is an Irish production company that has produced documentaries and television series for RTÉ, BBC and Channel 4. The company, founded by RTÉ television presenter Miriam O'Callaghan and her producer husband Steve Carson, has produced a number of series, including Fine Gael: A Family At War (2003), Our Lady's (2003), its follow-up Return to Our Lady's (2005), Legal Eagles (2004), Making Babies (2004) and Junior Doctors (2006). Amongst its most noted achievements are Haughey (2005) and the IFTA-winning Bertie (2008), two separate series on the lives and political careers of two of Ireland's more prominent taoisigh, Charles Haughey and Bertie Ahern.

The 2001 Mint-produced Ireland's Own examined the popular Irish magazine of the same name which was celebrating its 100th anniversary that year. The same year's Pearse - Fanatic Heart was a biopic of Irish rebel teacher Patrick Pearse. In 2002, Mint produced three biographical documentaries for BBC Four; Sharpton on the preacher Al Sharpton, Berlusconi on Italian politician Silvio Berlusconi and Mary Robinson: The Outsider on former President of Ireland Mary Robinson. That same year they produced Venezuela: The Two-Day Coup for the station. This focused on the period that April when the Presidency of Venezuela exchanged hands thrice in two days. Matthew Bourne: The Entertainer was a joint production for BBC Four/BBC Two on the controversial choreographer Matthew Bourne in 2002. A return to RTÉ led to Eamonn, a documentary on TV presenter Eamonn Andrews. All the Queen's Men was a joint production between RTÉ and the Irish Film Board which focused on the reasons behind hundreds of young Irishmen opting to fight in the British Army. In 2003 Paul Seawright: Hidden was produced for BBC Four. It focused on the Belfast photographic artist who grew up during the Troubles. Abu Hamza examined the controversial preacher Sheikh Abu Hamza al-Masri who has since been jailed in the UK. For a period of six months in 2002-03 Crash was filmed for RTÉ. It focused on the car crash epidemic that blights the Irish nation. Emmet was an account of the Republican revolutionary Robert Emmet who was hanged and beheaded in Dublin in 1803. In 2004 Who Kidnapped Shergar was produced for Channel 4 and RTÉ. It detailed the 1983 disappearance of the famous racehorse from County Kildare.
