= Brenda Donohue =

Irish radio and television presenter

- Employer: Raidió Teilifís Éireann (RTÉ)

Brenda Donohue (born c. 1966) is an Irish radio and television presenter.

== Personal life ==
Donohue is one of five children born to Mary and Michael Donohue in Newbridge, County Kildare. She is a graduate of University College Dublin, where she studied history and economics. She is married with three children: Ali, Robyn and Harvey.

== Career ==
Donohue came to the notice of an RTÉ producer during a live broadcast on the University College Dublin campus in the late 1980s. She was asked to join the newly launched The Gerry Ryan Show, RTÉ 2fm's mid-morning talk show. Donohue served as the show's roving reporter for eighteen years. Following Gerry Ryan's death in 2010, Donohue joined Mooney, where she worked as a reporter and sometimes hosted the programme itself. Donohue now works on the Marty Squad with Marty Morrissey and on Countrywide on Radio One.

From 2016, she has hosted a series on RTÉ Radio 1 called Like Family, a human interest series which looks at social change in Ireland in recent years. Donohue has previously presented other series on the station, including The B Side, The Health Show, Café Live and Going Home.

Despite her long career with RTÉ Radio, Donohue has critiqued the dominance of male presenters with the state broadcaster.

Though she has primarily worked in radio, Donohue has also presented a number of TV shows including The Selection Box, Get Flirting and The House of Love and is a regular contributor to The Afternoon Show. Donohue also featured in the reality TV show Celebrity Bainisteoir as the Bainisteoir for Kilcullen in 2012 and also featured in Celebrity Operation Transformation in September 2016.
