= Derek Mooney =

Irish radio and television presenter (born 1967)

- Born: Derek James Mooney; 4 March 1967 (age 59); Dublin, Ireland
- Occupations: Radio producer, broadcaster
- Employer: Raidió Teilifís Éireann (RTÉ)
- Notable work: Echo Island; Mooney; Winning Streak

Derek James Mooney (born 4 March 1967) is an Irish radio and television presenter, as well as a radio producer. Until January 2015 he presented a weekday afternoon programme called Mooney on RTÉ Radio 1. He is the current executive producer across RTÉ Radio 1's nature and wildlife programming

On television he has often presented game shows and talent contests: his presentation credits include Echo Island, Gridlock, Winning Streak, the ill-fated Cabin Fever, You're a Star, The Big Money Game, Fame: The Musical, The Genealogy Roadshow and Who Knows Ireland Best?. At the end of these shows he uses his trademark farewell.

== Career ==
Mooney is one of Ireland's best-known television personalities and one of the country's most prolific broadcasters in the area of natural history. He idolised the late Gay Byrne as a child. Mooney's first job in RTÉ was during the 1984 Summer Olympics in Los Angeles when he acted as a runner, working through the night.

Mooney was one of the presenters of RTÉ children's television shows Echo Island from its inception in 1994 up until he left the programme in February 1996. He presented Gridlock later in the 1990s. He has presented Habitats, The Nature Line, Nature Trails, all for RTÉ Radio 1. He won an award – the ESB Millennium Environment Award – for the best item during the year on the environment in print, radio or television. His television shows on the natural history world include on RTÉ and Nature Detectives for the BBC.

First broadcast in 1995, Mooney is a radio programme on RTÉ Radio 1. Originally called Mooney Goes Wild on One, it focused on nature and wildlife, aired at weekends on RTÉ Radio 1, but in October 2006 it became simply Mooney, and the format changed to general chat and discussion and was given a regular weekday slot initially for two hours, then reduced to ninety minutes in 2007.

After Mike Murphy retired from Winning Streak in 2001, Mooney became the new presenter of the Saturday night game show, but was temporarily replaced by Laura Woods while he presented You're a Star from December 2005 and March 2006. In 2004, he was nominated for the Television Personality of the Year Award at the Irish Film and Television Awards. In addition to all of this Mooney has also presented and produced RTÉ's Liveline, as well as various religious and daily magazine programmes.

It was announced in July 2008 that Mooney was to step down as presenter of Winning Streak, after seven years. RTÉ relaunched the programme as Winning Streak: Dream Ticket in the autumn of 2008 with new presenters, Aidan Power and Kathryn Thomas, with new games and a new fresh feel to the show.

In 2008, Mooney hosted the Lotto's first Millionaire Raffle draw during a break in the Rose of Tralee. There was subsequently a major controversy and a National Lottery spokesperson was attacked over the manner in which the draw was conducted, i.e. not live, plus the coincidence that one of the new millionaires was from Tralee.

Mooney was the second host of the game show, The Big Money Game, taking over in 2009. He did so until 2011, then he was replaced by Brian Ormond and Sinéad Kennedy in 2012. Also in 2009, he offered to take a ten per cent pay cut due to the recession, drawing praise and admiration from some quarters.

In 2010 he presented Fame: The Musical, an RTÉ reality talent competition, and in 2011 he presented The Genealogy Roadshow. He dressed up as a leprechaun to beat a world record set by American talk show host Jay Leno. People came from Italy, Poland and Romania to participate. He hosted Mooney Tunes for RTÉ over Christmas 2011, an obvious pun on the similarity between the presenter's name and the word "Looney" as used in Looney Tunes, the Warner Bros. animated cartoon series.

In 2012 he presented RTÉ's quiz show Who Knows Ireland Best?.

Mooney announced the points given by Ireland to other nations in the Eurovision Song Contest in 2009, 2010 and 2011, just as he had previously done in 2000. He has become directly associated with this role in Irish life. He has expressed regret at not having had an opportunity to present The Late Late Show.

In February 2015, he took up the post of executive producer of RTÉ Radio 1's nature and wildlife programming.

== Salary ==
In May 2026, RTÉ bosses announced a re-categorisation of Mooney's salary from a producer to a producer with presenting roles. The change put Mooney inside the top-10 list of highest paid presenters. The list is published every year by the broadcaster. The scrutiny on salaries was exacerbated by the RTÉ secret payment scandal.

== Style ==
Mooney is often seen around Europe announcing the points for Ireland in the Eurovision Song Contest, and is recognised by Graham Norton on the BBC. He is known for his trademark "BYEEEE!"

In interviews I don't ask anybody anything too personal. I wouldn't like to think I would leave somebody in a situation where their whole life is destroyed because of something stupid I had said, or by me putting them on the spot.

— Mooney on himself

== Personal life ==
Mooney is an avid nature lover. Originally from Donnybrook, he resides in Kilmacud, a south Dublin suburb. His brother David died aged 44 in January 2007. He has nephews and nieces but would prefer not to have children of his own despite saying in 2010 "I might marry a woman yet". He came out as openly gay in 2012.

In interviews he lists his hobbies as travel, cinema, going to the gym and socialising in The George. He exercises in the gym because of his 6.2 cholesterol level. He is a close friend of Alan Hughes and was best man at his wedding to Karl Broderick. In 2012, he had a guest starring role in the comedy series Mrs. Brown's Boys.

Mooney has constant incurable tinnitus in his left ear, stemming from when he had a wet shave where "some kind of electronic device for massaging your face afterwards" was used on him. He felt a vibration jolt through his jawbone. Then there was "the 'zzzz' sound and it never leaving me". Because of this he leaves a television or radio switched on at night. He stated in 2010 that he sleeps for four hours. In 2013, he spoke of his intentions to "end his life" if he were ever to be diagnosed with a terminal illness, stating he made the decision after seeing his mother and brother suffering agonizing deaths.

In 2012, he scaled an embankment and railing to the overpass of a County Meath motorway to save the life of a 57-year-old man who had collapsed. Mooney called the emergency services and performed CPR. Mooney and the man appeared together on Liveline with Joe Duffy the following day.
