= Who Knows Ireland Best? =

- Presented by: Derek Mooney
- Country of origin: Ireland
- Original language: English
- No. of series: 1

Production
- Executive producer: Philip McGovern
- Production locations: RTÉ Television Centre, Donnybrook, Dublin 4, Ireland
- Camera setup: Multi-camera
- Running time: 30 minutes
- Production company: Big Mountain Productions

Original release
- Network: RTÉ One
- Release: 20 January 2012

Who Knows Ireland Best? is an Irish quiz show broadcast on RTÉ One from 20 January 2012. The show is presented by Derek Mooney, and air on Friday evenings. Who Knows Ireland Best? has been received positively, being described by media as the "highlight" of RTÉ's spring 2012 season.

== Format ==
Who Knows Ireland Best? has been likened to the British quiz show Family Fortunes. Two teams of contestants would be asked to guess the results of various surveys. Prior to the show 1,000 Irish people were asked 100 questions regarding Irish life (e.g. "What percentage of people admitted to speaking on a mobile phone whilst driving?" or "What percentage of women said they would not date someone who was unemployed?").

According to research commissioned for Who Knows Ireland Best?, shown in the second episode (in which three models took on three taxi drivers), 41% of Irish people have admitted to secretly checking their partner's emails or text messages.

== Production ==
=== Recording ===
The series was pre-recorded in front of a live studio audience at the RTÉ Television Centre over three days from 13 September to 15 September 2011.

== Transmissions ==
Series	Start date	End date	Episodes
1	20 January 2012	24 February 2012	6
