= The Genealogy Roadshow =

Irish television series

- Presented by: Derek Mooney
- Country of origin: Ireland
- Original language: English
- No. of series: 2
- No. of episodes: 7 (list of episodes)

Production
- Executive producers: Jane Kelly, Philip McGovern
- Production location: Around Ireland
- Running time: 52 minutes
- Production company: Big Mountain Productions

Original release
- Network: RTÉ One
- Release: 21 August 2011

The Genealogy Roadshow is an Irish genealogy television series created by Big Mountain Productions and presented by Derek Mooney. The first (2011) & second (2014) series were broadcast on RTÉ One.

== Season One ==
Season One was filmed around Ireland in 2011 and aired later that year. The first season had four episodes, each filmed at beautiful historical Irish locations, Slane Castle, Glenlo Abbey, Adare Manor & Carton House. The series was presented by Derek Mooney and he was joined by a leading team of genealogists & historians; Turtle Bunbury (historian), Nicola Morris (genealogist) and John Grenham (genealogist). The team traveled the country with the roadshow meeting members of the public and helping them trace their family's roots and discover surprising stories from the past. Series one featured extraordinary stories; The Collins family from Boston were reunited with long lost relations in Co Galway, the experts helped Paul Duffy from Co Meath trace the owner of a mysterious 1858 passport and they even found evidence of a link between Glenn Webb from Dublin and the Arctic explorer Ernest Shackleton.

== Season Two ==
The Second Season returned to RTÉ One on Sunday 11 May 2014. Derek Mooney returned to present and he was joined by historian Turtle Bunbury and professional genealogists John Grenham and Susan Chadwick. In each episode, Turtle, John and Susan met members of the public at the roadshows and helped them look into their family histories & mysteries. Unearthing the truth behind family stories and solving age old family questions.

In series two the experts helped a Dundalk man finds his links to St. Oliver Plunkett, A Cork man discovers that his relatives were saved from the gallows by none other than Daniel O’Connell in a famous trial and looked into how a Wexford man was spared a terrible fate at Custer's Last Stand, only to be forgotten by history, until now.

The second series was filmed at Powerscourt in Co Wicklow, University College Cork and Lumen Christi College, Derry.

== Format ==
The format is somewhat similar to Antiques Roadshow. Each episode is set in a particular city and usually deals with people from that city and the surrounding area. There are several segments per episode. An individual, or family, looking to know more about their heritage arrives with a specific question about someone they might be related to or the reported exploits of an ancestor. The Roadshow genealogists have a sit down meeting with the guests and, using video monitors and tablet computers, reveal to them their findings. The segments usually contain a short video clip explaining more about the time period which the segment focuses on. Interspersed with these longer segments are short, informal, meetings between the genealogists and a guest, revealing information about their ancestry.

It is "exactly like Antiques Roadshow except that it deals in dead people rather than mouldy artefacts", according to the Irish Independent's John Bolans.

== American version ==
An American version debuted in January 2014 on PBS.
