= Sunday with Miriam =

- Genre: Talk
- Running time: 50 minutes
- Country of origin: Ireland
- Language: English
- Home station: RTÉ Radio 1
- Hosted by: Miriam O'Callaghan
- Produced by: Yetti Redmond; Liz Sweeney; Claire Prior; Seamus Hosey
- Recording studio: Donnybrook, Dublin
- Original release: 11 July 2009 – present
- Website: Official website
- Podcast: Podcast

Sunday with Miriam (previously Miriam Meets...) is an Irish radio talk show. The programme began initially in July 2009, as a summer filler, presented by Prime Time and Saturday Night with Miriam presenter Miriam O'Callaghan. The show is broadcast on a Sunday morning.

In August 2009, it was announced the programme will have a permanent slot on a Sunday morning, just before The Marian Finucane Show. The programme is sponsored by Irish Ferries.

== History ==
Miriam Meets.. originally began an eight-week run, to fill in for Eamon Dunphy's Conversations with Eamon Dunphy, while he had summer holidays. Dunphy later announced he would cease presenting the programme. RTÉ confirmed in August 2009, that the programme would move to a permanent home on Sunday's at 10.00.

== Format ==
The programme has similarities to Dunphy's programme, but features two guests compared to one. The two guests are connected through "love, life or family ties". Like Conversations with Eamon Dunphy, the guests are asked to request three pieces of music.
