= Mooney (radio programme) =

Irish talk radio show

- Other names: Mooney Goes Wild (previous version, weekends)
- Genre: Chat, nature
- Running time: 90 minutes
- Country of origin: Ireland
- Languages: English, Irish
- Home station: RTÉ Radio 1
- Hosted by: Derek Mooney; Brenda Donohue
- Starring: Dr Richard Collins; Éanna ni Lamhna; Terry Flanagan; Dermot O'Neill
- Recording studio: Donnybrook, Dublin
- Original release: 2006 - – 2015
- Website: Official website
- Podcast: Podcast

Mooney (successor to Mooney Goes Wild) is an Irish radio programme broadcast on RTÉ Radio 1. Presented by Derek Mooney, the programme aired Monday to Friday from 15:00 to 16:30.

Mooney was the 18th most listened-to radio programme in Ireland. It was presented by Brenda Donohue or Aonghus McAnally when Derek Mooney was absent. Its predecessor programme, Mooney Goes Wild, was known for its coverage of nature and the later programme featured web broadcasts of blue tits nesting and hatching. In 2009, Mooney's blue tits nested live online in the gardens of President Mary McAleese.

== History ==
Mooney Goes Wild started in 1995 on Saturdays on RTÉ Radio 1. It mainly focused on wildlife and nature. Jackie and Daw was broadcast on Mooney Goes Wild. Mooney Goes Wild on One won the prestigious Prix d'Europe in Berlin in 2000, with the award given for a programme that observed the lives of two nesting jackdaws.

On 2 October 2006, the programme moved to a weekday slot.

In early 2009, RTÉ weather presenter Nuala Carey launched a nationwide search to find herself a man on Mooney. Reports of her escapades at several dating events accompanied by her friend Ciara were broadcast on the radio programme.

In 2011, it featured a world record attempt at having the most people dressed up as a leprechaun in the one place. People came from Italy, Poland and Romania to participate in the "Largest Gathering of People Dressed as Leprechauns".

Mooney combined with the RTÉ Concert Orchestra and the RTÉ radio audience to create Mooney Tunes from the Grand Canal Theatre for RTÉ over Christmas 2011, an obvious pun on the similarity between the presenter's name and the word "Looney" as used in Looney Tunes, the Warner Bros. animated cartoon series. Jedward put in an appearance at the show.

Listeners were left stunned on Friday 13 April 2012 when a caller to Mooney was attacked by a swarm of bees live on the national airwaves. The caller screamed down the telephone before going silent amid the sound of the buzzing swarm. Mooney bee expert Philip McCabe had been giving advice to the listener at the time of the incident.

In July 2012, Mooney criticised listeners who complained about the show discussing issues to do with the LGBT community.

== Format ==
With the change to Mooney the programme's focus changed more to general chat and interviews. It also had live music and music discussion. In 2009, Mooney was the first place to preview six contestants going up to represent Ireland in the Eurovision Song Contest. A memorable feature of the show was "Mooney's Money", whereby Mooney would dispense cash to listeners via a competition.

Dermot O'Neill was a frequent guest on the programme. As well as talking about gardening he was once offered to learn opera. He took up the challenge and performed at a New Year's Day concert on Mooney. Authors, such as Joan Geraghty, spoke about their books on the show.

Mooney also searched for a Little Orphan Annie to star in an Irish tour of the musical Annie. The finalists were reduced to three. The competition was won by Nastasia Vashko from Limerick.

Fridays were dedicated to the original format of the Mooney Goes Wild show, with guests, and panelists such as Éanna ni Lamhna, talking about nature and wildlife in Ireland. Annually Nestwatch had cameras in birds' nests. It was similar to the setup of the BBC's Springwatch. One nest box was installed in the gardens of President Mary McAleese at Áras an Uachtaráin in 2009 at her own invitation. The male blue tit once went missing and the female blue tit had only laid six eggs, half of what was initially expected.

Show reporter Terry Flanagan visited national school students to observe their freshly hatched chicks.

The weekday programme originally lasted two hours, but was shortened when Drivetime was extended. There are news and sport bulletin interruptions during the programme.
