= Change Your Tune =

2018 British TV music game show

- Genre: Music, Game show
- Presented by: Baz Ashmawy
- Country of origin: United Kingdom
- Original language: English
- No. of series: 1
- No. of episodes: 6

Production
- Production location: The London Studios
- Running time: 60 minutes (inc. adverts)
- Production company: Twofour

Original release
- Network: ITV
- Release: 1 April – 20 May 2018

Change Your Tune is a British music game show that has aired on ITV from 1 April to 20 May 2018. It is presented by Baz Ashmawy (50 Ways to Kill Your Mammy) in which some of Britain's worst singers undergo weeks of training to improve their voices before performing for the nation.

It was axed after just one series.

== Reception ==
ITV’s new series Change Your Tune, a talent show for bad singers, debuted on Easter Sunday (1 April), and a lot of people thought it was an elaborate April Fool’s Day prank.

The reality show sees a group of people who can’t sing undergo training from top vocal coaches to see if they can improve and be in with a chance of winning the £10,000 cash prize. Sunday night’s episode saw them take on live performances ahead of their lessons, and the results were, as you would expect, quite grating on the ears.
