= Gerald Kean =

Irish solicitor

- Born: 1957 (age 67–68); Cork, Ireland
- Education: University College Dublin (UCD)
- Occupation: Solicitor

Gerald Kean (born 1957) is an Irish solicitor from County Cork. He is regularly the subject of social columns, particularly in the Sunday newspapers which have reported his lavish spending sprees and sun holidays involving his wife and other people, with The Irish Times once describing him as having a "celestial odour". Mr. Kean has also appeared in numerous television shows including Prime Time, Tubridy Tonight, The Afternoon Show, The Podge and Rodge Show, The Restaurant and The Panel and on radio shows such as The Marian Finucane Show.

Kean competed in the first season of Celebrity Bainisteoir, finishing second to Marty Whelan. He later wrote a book about his experience. The book features several photos of Kean, with the English association footballer Alan Shearer being employed to write the foreword. The book discusses his business relationship with Shearer, including his handling of Shearer's contract negotiations before agreeing to take up the position of Newcastle United manager as well as their co-ownership of 'The Happy Magpie' gastropub in Newcastle City Centre.

Kean was in an on-off relationship with socialite Lisa Murphy, who died in 2024.

== Early life ==
Kean grew up in Cork following his birth there in 1957. His father was a member of Ireland's police force (Garda Síochána), his now-dead uncle Liam Hamilton was a former chief justice and two other uncles were also members of the legal profession. At twelve years of age Kean moved to County Wicklow. His parents began a bed and breakfast to pay his college fees to attend University College Dublin (UCD). At UCD Kean encountered his wife, Clodagh. He began his first job with the late solicitor Michael Martin on Dublin's Capel Street, earning a starting salary of IR£7,000 per annum, but had left to set up his own practice by the late 1980s. Through his cousin, the late English musician Wally Nightingale, and through acquaintances made in the course of speaking at lunches in England and the United States, he met a number of musicians and informed them of Ireland's tax exemptions for artists. Kean credits this with boosting his fledgling career.

== Career ==
Kean set up his solicitor's practice, Kean and Co., over fifteen years ago. He was recently disciplined by the solicitors disciplinary tribunal for professional misconduct. In comparison to accounts of Kean's social life, this story, though, received minimal coverage in the Sunday Independent, RTÉ, et al. He has one criminal conviction for drunken driving. He has represented a number of people in the entertainment industry, legally acting of behalf of musicians Jim Kerr, Simon Le Bon, Ronan Keating, George Michael, Jerry Lee Lewis and Johnny Cash. His company specialises in sporting law and represents over forty Premier League footballers. Kean appeared on the twenty-fourth episode of the third season of The Podge and Rodge Show, alongside the ballerina Monica Loughman on 11 February 2007. He appeared on the first episode of the previous to now series of The Restaurant, earning four stars. He & his partner, Lisa Murphy, also appeared on Podge n Rodge together. Note: Ms. Murphy also appeared as a guest of Podge and Rodge, who, again, are separate characters in their own right.

Kean claims to have received an Honorary Doctorate Degree from the American University in Florida, and styles himself "Dr. Gerald Kean BCL". The 'American University in Florida' (no web-page available), is not accredited to the American Association of Universities

In Celebrity Bainisteoir, Kean managed Mayfield GAA. In the first quarter-final in episode two he defeated model Glenda Gilson's Crumlin GAA in front of a home crowd of 4,000, having notably used his legal connections to convince Shay Given and Gordon Strachan to assist in his preparations. In the first semi-final in episode six, he defeated Aoibhinn Ní Shúilleabháin's Kiltimagh GAA, after All Star Cork player Niall Cahalane took a training session with the team and another training session took place at Páirc Uí Rinn with Cork players James Masters and Donncha O'Connor and a special yoga class was given to the team. In the final in the eighth and final episode, Kean was defeated by Marty Whelan's Maryland GAA. The two were later reunited when Kean appeared on The Panel on 20 November 2008 as a guest on the episode Whelan hosted.
