= Monica Loughman =

Irish ballet dancer and teacher

Monica Loughman is an Irish ballet dancer and teacher, writer, and television personality. She was the first Westerner to achieve solo status with the Perm State Theatre of Opera and Ballet of Russia, where she danced for 16 years. On her return to Ireland, she established a network of ballet schools. She was also featured on a television series, Ballet Chancers, and appeared in other TV shows such as The Panel, The Podge and Rodge Show, Tubridy Tonight and The Late Late Show. She is co-author of a book about her experiences.

== Early life ==
Loughman is from Santry in Dublin.

== Ballet Career ==
=== Ballet career in Russia ===
Loughman left Ireland at the age of fourteen for Perm State Ballet in Russia, becoming one of the few Westerners to dance for the prestigious Perm State Theatre of Opera and Ballet. She trained and danced for the company for 16 years.

=== Ballet career in Ireland ===
Back in Ireland, Loughman established a full-time training programme for professional ballet dancers, as well as a network of ballet schools. She created a ballet company by training indigenous dancers and hiring the support of Russian ballet figures. Starting with ballet schools taking children from age four and upwards, she built, over ten years, a progression to a youth company (Irish Youth Russian Ballet) and then the Monica Loughman Elite Ballet, as featured in Dance Europe magazine. Her company is now Ireland's largest structure of ballet training schools, and performs The Nutcracker, Vivaldi Seasons, Giselle and La Sylphide, The Monica Loughman Elite Ballet is committed to staging classical "main scale" ballet throughout Ireland and nurturing a new generation of dancers, choreographers and audiences. In a milestone decision, the Irish Arts Council funded a tour of The Nutcracker to theatres throughout Ireland in 2013.

Loughman currently trains dancers for professional careers in ballet, and for example, four young girls she trained were accepted for an apprenticeship with the Russian Ballet Theatre in St. Petersburg, Russia.

=== Media ===
On 21 September 2006, Loughman appeared on Dustin's Daily News. Loughman appeared on the twenty-fourth episode of the third season of The Podge and Rodge Show, alongside the celebrity solicitor Gerald Kean on 11 February 2007. On 15 February 2007, she appeared on youth chat programme, The Cafe, alongside celebrity weatherman Dáithí Ó Sé and Luan Parle. On 17 February 2007, Loughman appeared on the primetime chat show, Tubridy Tonight, alongside Bill O'Herlihy, Fionnula Flanagan and The Waterboys. On 4 December 2008, Loughman resurrected her sequence of guest appearances when she appeared on The Panel alongside the journalist Niall Stanage. She also appeared on The Late Late Show.

In a 2008 television series, Ballet Chancers, Loughman worked on training six young people, schooled in hip hop, to appreciate the art of ballet.

In 2014 Loughman appeared in the Channel 4 series Big Ballet with Wayne Sleep, as she worked with a troupe of plus-size amateur dancers to realise their dream of dancing Swan Lake.

== Personal life ==
Loughman and her former partner, Robert Gabdullin, have one son.

== Publication ==
"If a teacher hits you, it means they're paying attention to you. It was better to be hit than to be ignored."

— ^{Monica Loughman in The Irish Ballerina.}

Loughman has co-written a book, The Irish Ballerina, with County Meath-based author, Jean Harrington, who helped the former Dublin prostitute Martina Keogh write her story in Survivor. Published in 2004 by Maverick House Publishers, the book discusses her childhood Russian experiences performing ballet. The book was reviewed in The Meath Chronicle and The Sunday Business Post and Loughman was interviewed for the magazine Woman's Way in December 2004.

She has also appeared in various magazines and newspapers, including the Meath Chronicle, The Sunday Business Post and Woman's Way

== See also ==
- List of women writers
