= Ballet Chancers =

- Created by: Animo Television Productions
- Starring: Monica Loughman
- Country of origin: Ireland
- Original language: English
- No. of series: 1
- No. of episodes: 6

Original release
- Network: RTÉ One
- Release: 16 November – 21 December 2008

Ballet Chancers is an Irish television programme broadcast on RTÉ One in late 2008. Featuring the ballerina, Monica Loughman, it began on 16 November 2008. In the show Loughman attempts to turn six streetwise hip hop dancers into elegant ballet dancers over a period of four months. At the end of the show they may, if successful, partake in a performance of The Nutcracker with Loughman's own company, The Irish Youth Russian Ballet Company which took place in the 21 December finale.

== Chancers ==
Six chancers participate in the show, three of each sex.

Name	Age	Origin	Other details
Sandra Fitzgerald	20	Glasnevin, Dublin	A hairstylist said to possess a "quirky nature and funky style" which "completely clash" with ballet, she refuses to lose her sense of individuality.
Donking Rongavilla	27	Newbridge, County Kildare (originally Philippines)	A regular hip-hop champion who can back-flip and windmill, teaches hip hop in Dublin and in Newbridge and thinks that ballet is "boring".
Matthew Williamson	19	Clonsilla, Dublin	Described as "the ultimate b-boy" and credited as "a born entertainer" by his family and friends, he is said to be "the boy least likely to don a pair of tights", wanting simply to do ballet "as a laugh".
Ian Harris	14	Hartstown, Dublin	The youngest of the Chancers, studying for his Junior Certificate and aspiring for a career in dance.
Stacey Grimes	16	Sheriff Street, Dublin	Studying for her Leaving Certificate and described as "a real homebird".
Annaleigh Meegan	23	Clogherhead, County Louth	Has performed in pantomimes and shows for nearly a decade, previously as a Spice Girl wannabe, later matured into hip-hop dancing but learning ballet is the realisation of a childhood dream.

== Episodes ==
The first episode was broadcast on 16 November 2008.

Date	Detail	Ref
16 November 2008	Monica Loughman and Patricia O'Riordan audition more than one hundred hip hop hopefuls as they attempt to find six dancers suitable for their ballet challenge.	
23 November 2008	The six hip hop dancers take their first ever ballet classes.	
30 November 2008	Rehearsals are continuing and the hip hop crew make a trip to the English National Ballet School in London.	
7 December 2008	The crew become acquainted with jazz ballet and perform with the professional dancers of Cork City Ballet.	
14 December 2008	Rehearsals intensify and the hip hop dancers discover if Loughman and the youth company director's, Patricia O'Riordan, will allow them on her stage to perform The Nutcracker.	
21 December 2008	The night of the performance arrives. A ballet audience of a thousand people watches the Chancers as they make their stage debut after four months of intensive training.	
