= Gridlock (game show) =

Irish television game show

- Genre: Game show
- Presented by: Derek Mooney
- Country of origin: Ireland
- Original language: English
- No. of seasons: 1

Original release
- Network: RTÉ
- Release: September 14, 1998

Gridlock is an Irish television game show, hosted by Derek Mooney, that premiered on RTÉ on September 14, 1998. Gridlock replaced the long-running series Blackboard Jungle, which was hosted by Ray D'Arcy.

The show lasted only one season. There were three teams of two people, each team representing a secondary school. One player on each team would answer general knowledge questions, while the other would try to achieve "gridlock" on a puzzle diagram.
