= Dermot Nally =

Irish cyclist

Personal information
- Born: 5 October 1980 (age 46) Cork, Ireland

Cycling career
- Sport: Cycling
- Current team: Retired
- Discipline: Road
- Role: Rider

Professional teams
- 2002: Colombia–Selle Italia (stagiaire)
- 2003–2004: Costa de Almería

Dermot Nally (born 5 October 1980 in Cork) is an Irish former cyclist.

== Major results ==
2002
1st U23 National Road Race Championships
1st Stage 2 Giro d'Abruzzo
2004
1st Stage 3 FBD Insurance Rás
