= Éanna Ní Lamhna =

Irish biologist and broadcaster

- Born: 1950 (age 75–76); Stabannon, Castlebellingham, County Louth
- Education: Convent of Mercy, Dundalk, and University College Dublin, later Ph.D.
- Occupations: Entomologist, nature, environmental and sustainability consultant, author, broadcaster, teacher and lecturer
- Employer(s): Self-employed consultant, Raidió Teilifís Éireann (RTÉ)
- Known for: "Ireland's best known entomologist," books on nature in Dublin and Ireland, presenting on Mooney Goes Wild and Mooney and other RTÉ radio and television programmes, especially related to nature and the environment

Éanna Ní Lamhna (born 1950) is an Irish biologist, environmental consultant, radio and television presenter, author and educator. She is one of the best-known public figures in Ireland in the area of nature and the environment, and was listed as one of Ireland's "Influential 100" in 2012. She was president of the national environmental charity An Taisce (which had a mission to celebrate and protect Ireland’s natural and cultural heritage) for five years in the 2000s, and currently has an ex-officio seat on its Council.

She was also President of the Tree Council of Ireland from 2012 - 2014 & 2020 - 2023. She currently serves as its Public Relations Officer.

In November 2024, Ní Lamhna was awarded an honorary DSc by University of Galway for services to science and science communication.

In December 2024, Ní Lamhna was nominated by An Taisce, the National Trust for Ireland, as a candidate for the 2025 Seanad election on the Cultural and Educational vocational panel. She was not elected to the Seanad.

== Early life ==
Ní Lamhna was born and reared in Stabannon, near Castlebellingham, County Louth. Her father, Peadar Ó Lamhna, was a teacher in the local national school, and taught her in 5th-7th class.

== Career ==
Ní Lamhna qualified in the biology area at UCD, including botany and microbiology and postgraduate studies in plant ecology. She pursued studies in the area of entomology, and also has a known interest in bats. She also qualified to teach in Irish second-level schools, with the Higher Diploma in Education. In later years, she also received a Ph.D. Ní Lamhna went to work for State environmental agency An Foras Forbartha (now the EPA) and played a key role in ground-breaking species distribution mapping carried out in Ireland by that body in the 1970s and 1980s. In the same period she also served for some years as Hon. Secretary for the Irish part of the Botanical Society of the British Isles. In 1988 she took early retirement and began work as a consultant, educator, and in broadcasting. She has worked extensively with primary and secondary schools, including on such programmes as Heritage in Schools and the Ringo Project, and as an inspector of trainee teachers. She has also lectured in the Dublin Institute of Technology, notably on Sustainable Development.

=== Broadcasting ===
Ní Lamhna has worked on Mooney and its predecessor Mooney Goes Wild since 1995. She also featured on TV series Creature Feature and was a regular on children's programme The Den. She has appeared multiple times on The Late Late Show and has also appeared on The Panel, Celebrity Jigs 'n' Reels, and other programmes.

In May 2020, Ní Lamhna released a two-part interview as part of David Oakes' Trees A Crowd podcast.

=== Writing ===
Ní Lamhna has co-written, edited or written a number of books, including:

- Provisional Distribution Atlas of Amphibians, Reptiles and Mammals in Ireland, 2nd edition (editor), Dublin: Foras Forbatha, 1979
- Distribution Atlas of Butterflies in Ireland: European Invertebrate Survey (editor), Dublin: Foras Forbatha, 1980
- Air Quality Surveys of various parts of Ireland (co-author), Dublin: Foras Forbatha, 1983-1988
- Talking Wild: Wildlife on the Radio, Dublin: Townhouse, 2002
- Science All Around Me (3, 4, 5, 6) (co-author), Dublin: Educational Company of Ireland, 2003-2004
- Wild and Wonderful, Dublin: Townhouse, 2004
- Straight Talking Wild: More Wildlife on the Radio, Dublin: Townhouse, 2006
- Wild Dublin, Dublin: O'Brien Press, May 2008
- Wildlife in Schools: A Book for Primary School Teachers, Navan: Meath Co. Council (with Laois and Monaghan Co. Councils), 2009

and papers including worksheets for schoolchildren and:

- Oil Pollution Monitoring (beached birds) 1985–1986, Dublin: Foras Foratha, 1986
- Terenure Wildlife, a baseline study of the Terenure area, 1992
- Terenure Wildlife Management Plan, Terenure (Dublin): Terenure Tidy Towns Committee, 2006?

=== Charitable work ===
Ní Lamhna has a record of charitable events, including talks and guided walks for good causes. She was also president of An Taisce from 2004 to 2009.

=== Public figure ===
Ní Lamhna is one of the best-known environmental figures in Ireland, and is at number 96 in the "Influential 100" list voted in by a broad panel for Ireland's Village Magazine in early 2012; she was one of just three environmental figures on that list (with Frank Convery and Frank McDonald). She is also a member of the statutory Advisory Committee of Ireland's Environmental Protection Agency, having been nominated by the Irish Environmental Network for the 2010–2013 term.

== Personal life ==
Ní Lamhna is married to John Harding, and they have two sons and one daughter. She has lived in Dublin since 1967. She is a fluent speaker of Irish, and does talks, broadcasts and school visits in Irish.
