= The Panel (Irish TV series) =

- Created by: Happy Endings Productions
- Starring: Ed Byrne; Neil Delamere; Mairead Farrell; Andrew Maxwell; Colin Murphy; Dara Ó Briain
- Country of origin: Ireland
- Original language: English
- No. of episodes: 84

Production
- Running time: 45 minutes per episode

Original release
- Network: Network 2/RTÉ Two (2003–2008); RTÉ One (2008–2011)
- Release: 15 September 2003 – 26 January 2011

The Panel is a talk show produced by Happy Endings Productions for RTÉ, based on the Australian programme The Panel, produced by Working Dog Productions for Network Ten. The theme song was "Waterfall" by The Stone Roses.

Until 2006 it was hosted by Dara Ó Briain. Ó Briain, having presented Echo Island, came to popular acclaim at home through his regular appearances in Don't Feed the Gondolas, a topical comedy show in the same Monday night slot on Network 2.

Recorded at various locations around Dublin—including Belvedere College's O'Reilly Theatre, Dublin City University's Helix Theatre and Blanchardstown's Draíocht Theatre—its sudden apparent cancellation in December 2005 annoyed fans but The Panel returned with a largely unchanged format in October 2006. Until early 2008 it aired on Network 2 (later RTÉ Two), usually on a Monday night. A disastrous move to RTÉ One (with the role of presenter rotated among the likes of Ray D'Arcy, Charlie Bird, and Dáithí Ó Sé) preceded the show's demise; one last run began on 7 October 2010 and ran each Thursday at 22:15 on RTÉ One until 26 January 2011, with Craig Doyle presenting.

== Format ==
The show had a host who chaired the discussion, along with four panellists who changed from week to week. Regular panellists included Colin Murphy, Andrew Maxwell, Neil Delamere, Mairead Farrell and Eleanor Tiernan. They discussed current events, interspersed with interviews with special guests. Panelists were typically professional comedians, and as such the show aimed for pure comedy, rather than any hybrid of discussion or analysis and topical jokes. The producers and regular performers were clear that the show was distinguished from other panel shows by the absence of games, rounds, scores or other contrivances.

== Panelists ==
The iconic Panel mug, from which the panellists would sip.

Original and recurring panelists included:

- Ed Byrne
- Neil Delamere
- Mairead Farrell
- Andrew Maxwell
- Colin Murphy^{1}
- Dara Ó Briain^{2}
- Dermot Whelan
1. Since Ó Briain ceased to be a regular, Murphy is the panellist who has appeared in the most episodes.
2. The show's former regular presenter, he only appeared on one show of the 2007–2008 season, although he hosted the episode on which he appeared.

== List of episodes ==
=== First series ===
The first series aired on Network 2 live from The Helix in Dublin City University (9:30 – 10:30 pm) each Monday between 15 September and 17 November 2003. It was repeated on Saturdays at 10:05 pm.

=== Second series ===
The second series aired on Network 2/RTÉ Two (the channel's name changed mid-series) live from Vicar Street at 10.00 pm each Monday between 13 September and 8 November 2004. It was preceded on Monday 6 September with a Best Of… from the first series.

=== Third series ===
The third series aired on RTÉ Two on Sunday evenings at 9:30 in early 2005. It was recorded in advance at The Mermaid Arts Centre in Bray and the O'Reilly Theatre in Belvedere College.

=== Next series ===
Date	Host	Panelists	Guests	Details
16 October 2006	O'Briain	Ed Byrne, Delamare, Murphy, Nolan	Gordon D'Arcy, Jack L	
23 October 2006	O'Briain	Delamare, Maxwell, Murphy, Nolan	Éanna ni Lamhna, Albert Jack	Details
30 October 2006	O'Briain	Delamare, Maxwell, Murphy, Ní Shúilleabháin	John Simpson	
6 November 2006	O'Briain	Ed Byrne, Murphy, Nolan, Spain	Christopher Brookmyre, Derval O'Rourke	Details
13 November 2006	O'Briain	Ed Byrne, Farrell, Maxwell, Murphy	Tom Dunne, Stephen Grey	Details
20 November 2006	Murphy	Ed Byrne, Farrell, Delamare, Maxwell	Allen Pease, Bill O'Herlily	Details
27 November 2006	O'Briain	Delamare, Bowman, Byrne, Murphy	Howard Marks, Jason Byrne	Details
4 December 2006	O'Briain	Delamare, Farrell, Murphy, Maxwell, Ed Byrne	Jilly Goolden, Adrian Dooley	Details
11 December 2006	O'Briain	Ed Byrne, Delamare, Murphy, Ní Shúilleabháin	Heston Blumenthal, Richard Dawkins	Details
18 December 2006	O'Briain	Ed Byrne, Maxwell, McLynn, Murphy	Simon Delaney, Martin King	Details
27 December 2006	O'Briain	Ed Byrne, Delamare, Farrell, Murphy	Éanna ni Lamhna, Mary O'Conor	Details
8 January 2007	Murphy	J.Byrne, Delamare, Farrell, Spain	Bernard Dunne, Manchán Magan	Details
15 January 2007	Murphy	Delamare, Farrell, Maxwell, Spain, O'Briain	Ian Robertson, Ruth Bradley	Details
22 January 2007	Murphy	Delamare, Ní Shúilleabháin, Maxwell, Ed Byrne	David Norris, Ray D'Arcy	Details
29 January 2007	O'Briain	Ed Byrne, Farrell, Maxwell, Murphy	Danny Baker, Ben Goldacre	Details

==== The People Decide ====
In which the panellists discussed the 2007 general election. A special run of shows previewing the election, presented by Colin Murphy.

Date	Host	Panelists	Guests	Details
2 May 2007	Murphy	Delamere, Spain, Bishop, Loughrey Grant	Philippe Legrain, David Coffey	
9 May 2007	Murphy	Spain, Ní Shúilleabháin, Delamere, Maxwell	Damian Corless, Dr. Mark Hamilton	Details
10 May 2007				Details
16 May 2007	Murphy	Spain, Ní Shúilleabháin, Delamere, Maxwell	John Waters, Ivan Yates	Details
23 May 2007	Murphy	Delamere, Ní Shúilleabháin, Spain, Maxwell	Kevin Dundon, Alex Barclay	Details
30 May 2007	Murphy	J. Bishop, Farrell, Delamere, Maxwell	Senator David Norris, Iain Dale	Details

=== Sixth series ===
When the show returned for the 2007–2008 season there was no longer a single presenter; Neil Delamere or Colin Murphy presented in the absence of Ó Briain. Ó Briain returned to present one episode during this series, marking what would be his final appearance on the show, having moved on to employment in the neighbouring United Kingdom. The company he co-founded, Happy Endings Productions, continued to produce the show, and he retained an advisory relationship. Neil Delamere hosted The Panel for the first time on 8 October 2007.

Date	Host	Panelists	Guests	Details
1 October 2007	Murphy	J. Bishop, Farrell, Delamere, Byrne	Ben Pridmore, James Cromwell	Details
8 October 2007	Delamere	Murphy, Farrell, Whelan, Maxwell	Justine Delaney-Wilson, Chris Terrill	Details
15 October 2007	Delamere	Murphy, Farrell, Whelan, J. Bishop	Charley Boorman, Lisa O'Doherty	Details
22 October 2007	O'Briain	Murphy, Byrne, Maxwell, Ní Shúilleabháin	Sebastian Horley, Bryan Dobson	Details
29 October 2007	Delamere	Murphy, Farrell, Maxwell, Byrne	Steve Parsons, John Duddy	Details
5 November 2007	Delamere	Murphy, Farrell, Whelan, J. Bishop	Paul Costelloe, Dominic Streatfeild	Details
12 November 2007	Murphy	Maxwell, Farrell, Whelan, Byrne	Michael Stebbins, Katie Taylor	Details
19 November 2007	Murphy	Maxwell, Ní Shúilleabháin, Delamere, Byrne	Alison Jackson, Colin Bateman	Details
3 December 2007	Delamere	Murphy, Farrell, Bishop, Byrne	Trevor Baylis, Paddy Breathnach	Details
10 December 2007	Delamere	Murphy, Farrell, Whelan, Maxwell	Joe Simpson, Tony Fenton	Details
17 December 2007	Murphy	Maxwell, Farrell, Whelan, Delamere	Feargus O'Sullivan, René Caroyel	Details
27 December 2007	Delamere	Murphy, Farrell, Whelan, Byrne	Richard Corrigan, Dr. Mark Hamilton	Details
7 January 2008	Delamere	Murphy, Farrell, Whelan, Byrne	John Cooper Clarke, Gerry Robinson	Details
14 January 2008	Delamere	Murphy, Farrell, Whelan, Maxwell	Suzi Quatro, Eileen O'Keefe	Details
21 January 2008	Murphy	Maxwell, Farrell, Delamere, J. Bishop	Colm Meaney, Kevin Myers	Details
28 January 2008	Murphy	Whelan, Farrell, Delamere, Maxwell	Rita Carter, James Caan	Details

== Move to RTÉ One ==
RTÉ moved The Panel to RTÉ One in 2008, to be shown on Thursday evenings. In addition, RTÉ deployed a different presenter for each episode – these included Ray D'Arcy, Charlie Bird, Dáithí Ó Sé and Craig Doyle, the latter of whom was given the role on a more permanent basis before The Panel was brought to an end, all humour eked out of it. The first RTÉ One episode was, in what would become commonplace, criticised for being too serious; the panellists blamed this on their new setting.

In September 2008, RTÉ moved The Panel to its flagship television channel RTÉ One. A 14-episode run was announced, to begin airing on that channel at 22.15 on 30 October with a new presenter. Several prominent Irish broadcasters were screen-tested to fill the role of presenter, but a combination of unfortunate factors meant that show returned with rotating guest hosts, rather than any one person in a permanent position. Shortly before the airdate, RTÉ changed its schedules and the series began on 6 November at 22.15 with its original timescale of 45 minutes. Ray D'Arcy was the guest presenter for the week and was followed by a string of others including Gráinne Seoige, Dáithí Ó Sé, Marty Whelan, Charlie Bird, Phill Jupitus and Pauline McLynn. Producer Seamus Cassidy told The Irish Times that ""a reasonably big name, a very big name actually" would take over as permanent anchor in January 2009. On 23 November 2008, the Sunday Tribune reported that comedian Ardal O'Hanlon would be announced as the new permanent host. Former presenter Ó Briain indicated his awareness of the presenter in question, and was quoted as saying on a breakfast radio show that "HE is very funny" but refused to discuss the matter any further. However, in early 2009 it emerged there would be a further delay in obtaining a permanent host for "at least another couple of weeks", with Craig Doyle presenting the first show of the new year. In the event, the guest host format continued for the entire 2008–2009 series. Following a short run with David McWilliams at the helm in 2009, the show was thought to have been de-commissioned. However, at the launch of RTÉ's Autumn schedule in August 2010, Craig Doyle was announced as presenter for a new run of 14 shows.

2008–9

Jarlath Regan, Ian Coppinger, Carol Tobin, Alan Shortt and Evelyn O'Rourke made their debuts on the show as panellists in the 2008–09 season. Karl Spain also made a return in the fifth episode. Upon Ivan Yates's appearance in the sixth episode it was claimed that he was now the record holder of guest appearances on The Panel and the political bookmaker went on to guest-host an episode of the show in 2009. For the first three episodes of 2009 no female was present on The Panel for the first time; this was rectified in the fourth episode of the year with the addition of Evelyn O'Rourke.

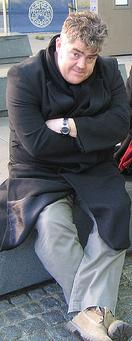
Phill Jupitus was hired especially by RTÉ to guest host an episode of The Panel.

Date	Host	Panelists	Guests	Details
6 November 2008	Ray D'Arcy	Murphy, Delamere, J. Regan, Ní Shúilleabháin	Kevin Myers and Duke Special	Details
13 November 2008	Gráinne Seoige	Murphy, Farrell, Delamere, Maxwell	Fionan Sheehan and Gerry Anderson	Details
20 November 2008	Marty Whelan	Delamere, Farrell, J. Regan, Maxwell	John Drennan and Gerald Kean	Details
27 November 2008	Charlie Bird	Murphy, Delamere, Ní Shúilleabháin, Coppinger	Philip Boucher-Hayes and Kenny Egan	Details
4 December 2008	Dáithí Ó Sé	Maxwell, Ní Shúilleabháin, Spain, Delamere	Monica Loughman and Niall Stanage	Details
11 December 2008	Phill Jupitus	Murphy, Farrell, Delamere, Maxwell	Derek Acorah, Ivan Yates	Details
18 December 2008	Diarmuid Gavin	Murphy, Tobin, Whelan, Delamere	Keith Barry, Marty Morrissey	Details

The Panel Unwrapped

- Shown on Tuesday, 30 December 2008

Date	Host	Panelists	Guests	Details
30 December 2008	Pauline McLynn	Murphy, Ní Shúilleabháin, Delamere, Maxwell	David Van Day, Derry Clarke	Details

Date	Host	Panelists	Guests	Details
8 January 2009	Craig Doyle	Murphy, Delamere, Alan Shortt, Maxwell	Karl Henry and Shane O'Donoghue	Details
15 January 2009	Tom McGurk	Murphy, Alan Shortt, Whelan, Delamere	Mikey Graham	Details
22 January 2009	George Hamilton	Murphy, Delamere, Alan Shortt, Maxwell	Antony Worrall Thompson	Details
29 January 2009	Ivan Yates	Murphy, Delamere, O'Rourke, Maxwell	Mark Hamilton	Details
5 February 2009	Baz Ashmawy	Delamere, Alan Shortt, Gildea, Maxwell	Terry Christian	Details
12 February 2009	Will Leahy	Murphy, Delamere, Farrell, Maxwell	Patrick Bergin, Niall O'Farrell	

2009–10

The first episode attracted an average audience share of 23 per cent. New presenter David McWilliams apologised to broadcaster Miriam O'Callaghan for comments of a sexist nature about her he had included in his latest book.

2010–11

The Panel returned on 7 October 2010 with a new host, Craig Doyle. The regulars Maxwell, Delamere, Murphy and Farrell returned, with Eleanor Tiernan, Bernard O'Shea, Dermot Whelan, Gearóid Farrelly, John Colleary, Kevin Bridges, Stephen K. Amos and Jack Whitehall appearing throughout the series. This series included the show's 100th episode.

== Cancellation ==
On 4 June 2011, Andrew Maxwell, one of the regular panellists said on Twitter that the show had been cancelled. The following day, RTÉ posted a headline confirming that the show had been cancelled; it read: "I can confirm that 'The Panel' won't be returning to our screens this autumn. The show has enjoyed nine seasons, the first six on RTÉ Two and the three most recent on RTÉ One".

== Live performances ==
The show was performed live to full houses in the Olympia Theatre from 11 to 13 September 2007 as part of the Bulmers Comedy Festival. These shows, following the format of the television show but with a longer running time and stronger language, were chaired by Colin Murphy and were not recorded for television.

== DVD ==
A DVD, The Panel – The Best of..., was released in December 2008.

== Mockumentary ==
As part of RTÉ Does Comic Relief, a telethon event that took place on 26 June 2020, in the midst of the COVID-19 Crisis, a mockumentary on the history of The Panel featured interviews from Dara Ó Briain, and panellists Ed Byrne, Neil Delamere, Mairead Farrell, Andrew Maxwell and Colin Murphy as well as guests Adam Hills and David Mitchell.
