= Maryland GAA =

Gaelic games club in County Westmeath, Ireland

- Cluain Mhuire CLG
- Founded: 1957
- County: Westmeath
- Colours: Blue, white
- Grounds: Fr. Brady Memorial Park, Drumraney
- Coordinates: 53.471149, -7.764657

Playing kits
Standard colours

Maryland GAA is a Gaelic football club based in Drumraney, County Westmeath, Ireland. It was founded in 1957.

Maryland play in the Westmeath Intermediate Football Championship and have been winners on 2 occasions, 1980 and 2008.

Maryland GAA were winners of the first season of Celebrity Bainisteoir in 2008 under the guidance of radio and television presenter Marty Whelan who replaced Fianna Fáil TD Mary O'Rourke as bainisteoir during the series. Whelan's team beat solicitor Gerald Kean's Cork team, Mayfield, in the final at Parnell Park on 16 May 2008.

== County representatives ==
Maryland were represented on both Westmeath's All Ireland Football victories.

David Martin became the club's first All-Ireland medalist in 1995, lining out at corner-forward in the All-Ireland Minor Football Championship victory over Derry.

In 1999, Richie Browne played at wing-forward on Westmeath's first All-Ireland Under-21 Football Championship success as Westmeath beat the reigning champions, a star-studded Kerry by 1-12 to 0-9. The Kerry were team managed by Jack O'Connor, and among the starting 15 were Tadhg Kennelly, Noel Kennelly, Paul Galvin and Tomás Ó Sé.

Maryland had two players on the Westmeath county football team at senior level: Kieran Martin and Callum McCormack, both representing Westmeath during the county's run to the 2015 Leinster Senior Football Championship final. Martin retired from inter-county football in November 2025.
