= Pamela Flood =

Irish television presenter and former model

- Born: Pamela Ann Mary Flood; 25 July 1971 (age 55); Tallaght, Dublin, Ireland
- Modelling information
- Height: 1.78 m (5 ft 10 in)
- Hair colour: Blonde
- Eye colour: Green

Pamela Ann Mary Flood (born 25 July 1971) is an Irish former TV host, former model and beauty pageant titleholder who was crowned Miss Ireland 1993.

A former employee of RTÉ, she was at one time a well-recognised face on the broadcaster's television channels, having presented Off the Rails, Marry Me and The Podge and Rodge Show. She also made an appearance in the genealogy series Who Do You Think You Are?, learning that her grandmother was an illegitimate child and that a deceased distant relative was accused of murdering her husband, but later found not guilty - over 160 years ago. She then went on to feature on Celebrity Showhouse broadcast on 29 December 2008.

== Career ==
Flood worked as a continuity officer with national broadcaster RTÉ from 1997 to 2000, and was a presenter of Irish fashion television show Off the Rails for a number of years before receiving the axe in 2008.

Flood moved on to Marry Me, of which there were eight editions, and has presented two editions of The Podge and Rodge Show, For her research in the RTÉ series Who Do You Think You Are? she travelled through 19th-century Dublin, "taking in red light districts, millionaire solicitors, pawnbrokers, contested wills, illegitimate children and murder." She met historian David Nolan, who has written a history of Corballis House, where her granny was sent to stay and subsequently discovered she was born out of wedlock. She appeared on the front cover of the RTÉ Guide to promote the show, and on Anonymous as "Doreen Prendergast".

Flood has since found herself exposed and vulnerable at RTÉ.

== Personal life ==
In 2008, Flood announced the recent end of her three-year relationship with Michael Sharp, the manager of Denis Desmond's Spirit nightclub in Dublin. She then began a new one with restaurateur, Ronan Ryan.

Flood and Ryan appeared in the news in 2019 following a public battle with their mortgage provider over a house in which the couple had been living in Clontarf, Dublin. It was reported that the couple had been living in the property valued at €900,000 yet had not made a mortgage payment in over 9 years. Nevertheless, the couple refused to vacate the property.
