= Marisa Mackle =

Irish writer

- Born: c. 1973; Armagh, Northern Ireland
- Occupations: Writer, journalist
- Children: 1
- Writing career
- Pen name: Marisa Mackle
- Genre: Romance
- Website: marisamackletravel.com

Marisa Mackle (born c. 1973) is a journalist and romance novelist of over 13 books who also writes for children.

== Life and work ==
Born in Armagh, Northern Ireland about 1973, Mackle now lives in Dublin, Ireland. She was educated in Mount Anville in Dublin before travelling Europe for several years. She became an air hostess and a receptionist and has used her experiences in her novels. She began writing in hotels while working as an air hostess. Her first novel was successful and today she writes both books and articles, including for the Herald. Her novels are mostly romance novels however she also writes for children.

She has two sisters and is vegan. She has one son Gary.

== Bibliography ==
- Mr. Right for the Night (2002)
- So Long Mr. Wrong! (2003)
- The Mile High Guy (2004)
- Chinese Whispers (2005)
- Man Hunt (2006)
- Confessions of an Air Hostess (2007)
- Living Next Door to Alice (2008)
- Party Animal (2008)
- Anything for Love(2009)
- Along Came a Stork (2011)
- More Than A Feeling (2011)
- The Secret Nanny Club (2012)
- No More Fish (2013)

=== Novels for children ===
- The Girl in the Yellow Dress (2010)
- Lucy Goes to Hollywood (2011)
