= Andrew Maxwell =

Irish comedian and narrator

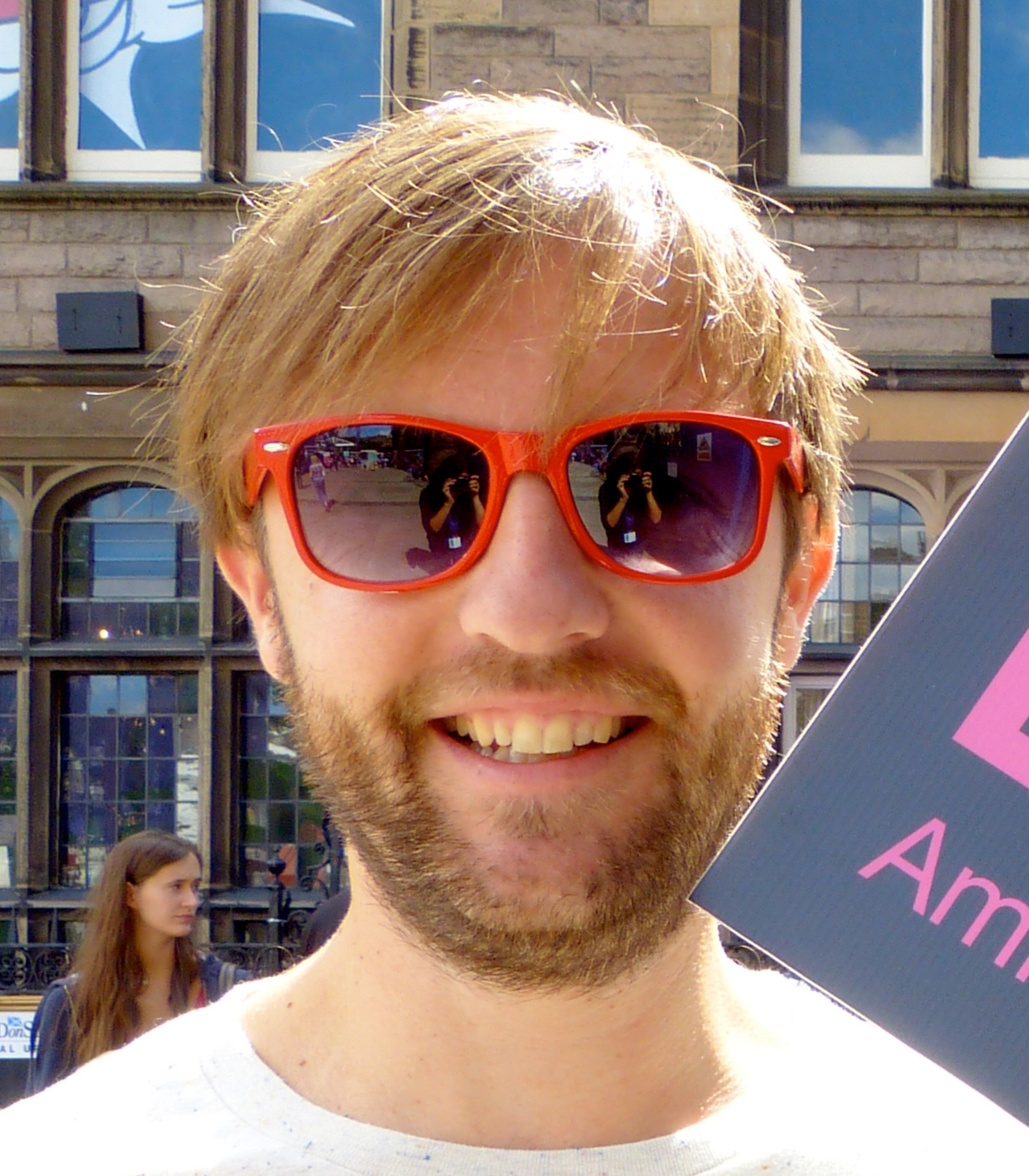
- Maxwell in 2013
- Born: 3 December 1974 (age 51); Dublin, Ireland
- Education: Mount Temple Comprehensive School
- Occupation: Comedian
- Years active: 1992–present
- Children: 4
- Website: Official website

Andrew Maxwell (born 3 December 1974) is an Irish comedian and narrator, known for narrating the MTV reality series Ex on the Beach.

== Career ==
In 1992, Maxwell tried stand-up comedy for the first time at the Comedy Cellar at The International Bar in Dublin, and from 1995, he made regular appearances on BBC Two's Sunday Show. Other credits for Maxwell include RI:SE as the United States correspondent, a regular guest slot on a weekly topical comedy-style chat show The Panel which ran on Irish channel RTÉ One from 2003 until 2011, and regular appearances on British TV shows Never Mind the Buzzcocks and Mock the Week. He appeared on the Secret Policeman's Ball in 2006, while a Funny Cuts special for E4, called Andrew Maxwell – My Name Up In Lights aired that same year. In 2014, Maxwell appeared in Comedy Central's Drunk History and was the narrator of Ex on the Beach, an MTV reality television series. Maxwell has narrated every series since the series launched. In October 2018, Maxwell appeared in the Irish episode of the History series Al Murray: Why Does Everyone Hate The English alongside host Al Murray. Maxwell was voted the "King of Comedy" on the Channel 4 reality TV show of the same name. In 2007 he was nominated for the if.comedy award for the best show at the Edinburgh Fringe.

Maxwell also hosts his own weekly late-night comedy gig Fullmooners, which mainly takes place in London but also tours around comedy festivals such as Edinburgh. It has featured comics like Russell Brand, Simon Pegg, Tommy Tiernan and Ed Byrne. It also always features break-dancers, singers and Tim FitzHigham. Maxwell has also presented a BBC Radio 4 series called Welcome to Wherever You Are, featuring comics from all over the world. In November 2019, it was announced that Maxwell would be participating in the nineteenth series of I'm a Celebrity...Get Me Out of Here!, which he finished in eleventh place. He appeared on BBC Radio 4's The Museum of Curiosity in October 2019. His hypothetical donation to this imaginary museum was "A scale model old gipsy caravan".

== Personal life ==
Maxwell has been married to his Egyptian wife Suraya since 2015; the couple have three children as of 2019. He is a supporter of Liverpool Football Club.
