= Steve Carson =

Irish television director and producer

- Born: Stephen Carson; 1968 (age 57–58); Belfast, County Antrim, Northern Ireland
- Education: University of Manchester
- Occupations: Director; Producer
- Known for: Head of Multi-Platform Commissioning, BBC Scotland
- Spouse: Miriam O'Callaghan

Steve Carson (born 1968 in Belfast) is an Irish director and producer of television. He was Head of Multi-Platform Commissioning at BBC Scotland.

With his wife, the RTÉ presenter Miriam O'Callaghan, he was co-owner of the television production company Mint Productions, whose work has been amongst the nominees and winners at the Irish Film and Television Awards (IFTAs).

== Early life and career ==
Carson was born in Belfast where he attended Methodist College and subsequently was an undergraduate at Manchester University. His father Tom Carson was the long standing Features Editor of the Belfast Telegraph and his mother Patricia Carson was elected as a Belfast Councillor in 1973 for the Alliance Party, but died a few weeks later that year from cancer before she could take up her seat on the council. Carson trained as a producer/director with the BBC on flagship current affairs programmes such as Newsnight and Panorama before setting up his Mint Productions company in 2000. Carson has won a number of awards including a Royal Television Society award, two Irish National Media awards and the Jury Prize at the 2008 Celtic Media Festival.

Mint Productions made many highly acclaimed documentaries and documentary series including the award winning Pearse, Haughey, Bertie. In 2008, he acted as co-executive producer—alongside his wife—on the genealogy series Who Do You Think You Are?.

=== RTÉ ===
On 30 January 2009, Carson was named by RTÉ as its Director of Programmes, Television.

In 2011, he was made RTÉ's editor of current affairs following RTÉ's defamation of Fr. Kevin Reynolds in "Mission to Prey".

In 2024 he returned to RTÉ becoming their Director of Video.

=== BBC ===
Carson subsequently returned to the BBC and become BBC Northern Ireland's Head of Production. He is now Head of Multi-Platform Commissioning for BBC Scotland and involved in the launch of the new BBC Scotland Channel on 24 February 2019.

== Personal life ==
Carson is married to Miriam O'Callaghan, one of Ireland's best known TV and Radio broadcasters. They met when they were both working for BBC Newsnight in June 1995.
