= Marjorie Quarton =

Irish novelist

- Born: Marjorie Smethwick; 1930 (age 95–96); Nenagh, County Tipperary
- Occupation: Writer

Marjorie Quarton (born 1930) is an Irish novelist.

== Life and work ==
Born Marjorie Smethwick to Standish Smethwick and Dolly Webb in 1930 in Nenagh, County Tipperary. She was educated in Dublin. Quarton did not start her writing career until she was in her 50s. She has written novels, memoirs, children's books and newspaper articles.

Quarton was a horse, sheep and cattle breeder and also worked for the National Council for the Blind of Ireland. She has written on dogs, particularly sheepdogs. She is a member of PEN and resides near Nenagh.

== Bibliography ==
- Corporal Jack (London: Collins, 1987)
- No Harp Like My Own (London: Collins, 1988)
- Renegade (London: André Deutsch, 1991)
- Breakfast The Night Before : Recollections of an Irish Horse-Dealer (André Deutsch, 1989)
- Saturday's Child (André Deutsch, 1993)
- The Cow Watched the Battle (Dublin: Poolebeg, 1990)
- The Other Side of the Island (Dublin: Poolbeg, 1991)
- Longshot, No Harp Like My Own, Trial, The Flight Of Flamingo by Dick Francis, Marjorie Quarton, Clifford Irving, Elizabeth Darrell, (Reader's Digest, 1991)
