= Mayfield GAA =

Gaelic games club in Cork City, Ireland

Mayfield
- Baile na mBocht
- Founded: 1893
- County: Cork
- Colours: Red and White
- Grounds: Lotabeg, Mayfield

Playing kits
Standard colours

Mayfied GAA Club (CLG Baile na mBocht) is a Gaelic Athletic Association club based in the Mayfield area of Cork City, Ireland. Teams are fielded in Gaelic football, hurling, and Ladies' Football. The club participates in Cork GAA competitions and in Seandún board competitions. The club competes at Intermediate level in football and in hurling. In 2016/17, Mayfield were crowned Cork City (Seandún), Cork County, Munster and All-Ireland Junior Hurling Champions.

== History ==
=== Club foundation ===
Mayfield GAA Club was formed in 1893 and competed, at both Minor and Junior level, with victories during its early years in several feiseanna and tournaments. The club entered a trial period of merging with local clubs, Brian Dillon's and Sarsfields in 1903 to form a senior team. However, following several quarrels between members of each club, the trial period ended and each club went back to representing its respective area.

The club's progress mostly stopped following World War I, along with other GAA clubs throughout the country, as the club's members were harassed and arrested by British Forces. Another amalgamation was attempted between local clubs in the Mayfield and surrounding area in 1922. Mayfield declined to merge because of the earlier failed attempt at amalgamation in 1903.

=== 1920–1969 ===
Mayfield affiliated with the newly established City Division in the 1920s and won the City Division Junior Hurling Championship for the first time in 1935. The club retained these titles in the three years that followed. The 1935 Cork Junior Hurling Championship final between Mayfield and Castlemartyr, became famous in that this final was played four times and never brought to conclusion. The Cork County Board decided that no medals would be presented and both teams were suspended. Following the victories of the 1930s, many players retired from hurling which led to a lean period on the playing field. 1954 saw the first Mayfield Junior Football Team being entered into the City Division Junior Championship and League. In 1959, they won the City Division Junior A Football Championship, beating St. Nicholas' in the final.

In 1962, the club moved the clubhouse to its present day location on Kerry Road. The club had success in hurling in the City Division Junior A Hurling Championship in 1967, after a 32 year gap. They reached the County Final in 1969, but were defeated by Kanturk.

=== 1970-1989 ===
In the 1970s, Mayfield claimed a total of 18 titles at adult level across both codes, including a victory in the hurling County Final in November 1978. This victory over Carrigtwohill was the first ever victory by a Mayfield team in an adult level County Final. In the 1980s, however, Mayfield experienced another lean period.

=== 1990-2000 ===
The 1990s saw the club experience a revival in fortunes. A restructuring of the underage section began to pay dividends, and the club won the Minor A Championship in football and hurling in 1994, 1995 and 1996. A City Division Junior A Football Championship followed in 1997, as well as the Junior A Hurling Championship in 1999. Developments of the club's facilities also took place. These included the upgrading of existing pitches at Lotabeg and the addition of two new pitches across the road. This also included the refurbishment of the clubhouse on Kerry Road.

=== 2000-2015 ===
In January 2002, a new complex was built at the club grounds at Lotabeg which comprised a new gym, a multi-purpose sports hall, a 400 seat viewing stand over the main pitch, and new dressing rooms. In January 2004, the Cork County Board recognised the performances at Junior Football level over the previous few years and regraded the club to Premier Intermediate football status.

In 2008, Mayfield GAA Club was nominated to partake in the RTÉ television program Celebrity Bainisteoir. The series involved various celebrities taking over as coaches of local Gaelic football teams and competing against each other. The Celebrity Bainisteoir for Mayfield was solicitor Gerald Kean. The club progressed to the final of the competition by beating Crumlin of Dublin and Kiltimagh of Mayo. However, Mayfield was defeated in the final of the competition by a strong Maryland team from Westmeath.

2010 and 2011 saw Mayfield win the City Division Junior A Hurling Championship, beating local rivals Brian Dillons both years. In 2011, the club reached the final of the Cork County Junior A Championship, losing to Charleville after a replay. In 2012, the intermediate footballers were relegated from the Premier Intermediate level to Intermediate level. This was a disappointing result for the club, as it had claimed victory in the Tom Creedon Cup in the same year.

Further redevelopment of the club facilities at Lotabeg began in 2014. The small pitch next to the main pitch was sold and the funds received were used to redevelop the pitches across the road to include a sand-based pitch. In 2015, the underage coaching structure of the club was awarded Category Silver in the Lee Coaching Initiative, which "recognises excellence in coaching standards at underage level".

=== City, County, Munster and All-Ireland victory 2016/2017 ===
The 2016/17 season was one of the best in the club's history. In October 2016, Mayfield defeated Sarsfields in the county final, in what is the second ever county championship victory at adult level in the club. A Munster title was added in December 2016, with victory over Ballyduff from Waterford. Mayfield became All-Ireland Junior Hurling Champions in February 2017 with a win over the Kilkenny and Leinster champions, Mooncoin.

== Achievements ==
- All-Ireland Junior Club Hurling Championship (1) 2017
- Munster Junior Club Hurling Championship (1) 2016
- Cork Junior Hurling Championship (2) 1978, 2016
- Cork City Junior Hurling Championship (11) 1935, 1967, 1969, 1971, 1978, 1999, 2002, 2005, 2010, 2011, 2016
- Cork City Junior Football Championship (7) 1959, 1968, 1975, 1997, 2000, 2001, 2003
- Cork Senior Camogie Championship (1) 1935
- Cork Minor B County Football Championship (1) 2022

== Sources ==
- Mayfield GAA Website
- Seandún GAA Website
