= Baz Ashmawy =

Irish radio and television personality, actor, writer

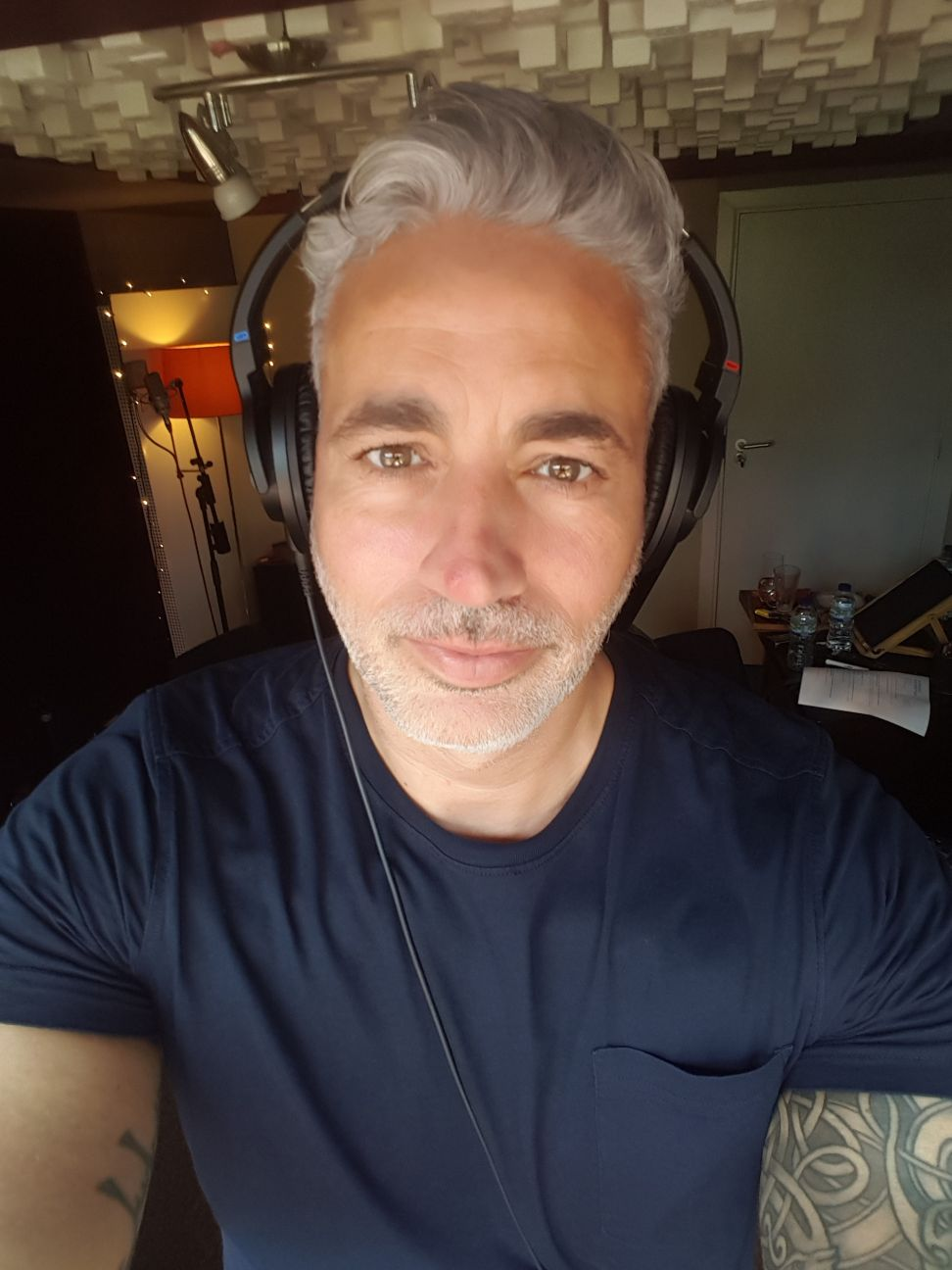
- Born: Bazil Ashmawy; 9 April 1975 (age 51); Libya
- Occupations: TV and Radio Presenter / Actor / Writer
- Known for: 50 Ways to Kill Your Mammy; Faithless TV Series; That Baz Thing; The Fanatics; How Low Can You Go?; Fáilte Towers; Baz's Culture Clash; Baz's Extreme Worlds; Weekend Breakfast with Baz & Lucy; Baz The Lost Muslim; Change Your Tune; DIY SOS: The Big Build Ireland; Best Place To Be
- Children: 2
- Awards: International Emmy Award for Best Non-Scripted Entertainment award; IFTA Award

Bazil Ashmawy, commonly known as Baz Ashmawy, is an Irish radio and television personality, whose TV show 50 Ways to Kill Your Mammy won the International Emmy Award for Best Non-Scripted Entertainment award. In 2024, Baz created, wrote and starred a TV Series Faithless for Virgin Media Television. Baz hosts The Money List and Best Place To Be for RTÉ One and both shows have been renewed for a second seasons. Baz also is the host of DIYSOS The Big Build Ireland. In summer 2017, he hosted That Baz Thing on RTÉ Radio 1. Ashmawy co-hosted Weekend Breakfast with Baz & Lucy on RTÉ 2fm in 2010, and co-presented the 2008 reality show Fáilte Towers on RTÉ One, as well as the popular travel show How Low Can You Go on RTÉ Two. In 2018 he began presenting ITV's new singing show – Change Your Tune.

== Early life ==
According to an article in The Nationalist (Carlow), Ashmawy's mother Nancy is from Ballycoog, Avoca, County Wicklow although Ashmawy was born in Libya and is part-Egyptian. He moved to Ireland at age eight and grew up in the Dublin suburb of Churchtown and attended CUS Leeson Street for a period of time.

== Career ==
Ashmawy is best known for 50 Ways to Kill Your Mammy which was first broadcast on Sky 1. The show is based on Baz inserting his 71-year-old mother Nancy into various dare-devil situations, and documenting her typical "Irish mammy" reactions to the situations.

In November 2015 50 Ways to Kill Your Mammy won the Best Non-Scripted Entertainment award at the 2015 International Emmy Awards.

Prior to that, Ashmawy was on the popular RTÉ Two travel show, How Low Can You Go? where he appeared with co-presenters Mark O'Neill and Michael Hayes. In remarking on his experiences with that show, Ashmawy said that he loved Las Vegas where he received a lap dance from (as he describes) 'a former hooker who looked like she was in her late 50s' and said of his experiences on the set of a porn movie in California that 'We saw things there that will be in our minds for a very long time.'

Ashmawy is also a sports fan who tried his skill at GAA management on the RTÉ show Celebrity Bainisteoir. According to The Irish Times, Ashmawy managed managing his team while wearing 'nicely polished footwear'. When asked in an RTÉ Sport interview who he would like to see win the 2007 Rugby World Cup, Ashmawy joked that he was 'not going for the patriotic 'Go Ireland' I'd have to say New Zealand...typical. How boring is that. Think I've made myself feel a little sick there saying that. I'm going back....'GO IRELAND!'

He appeared in Jason Byrne's award-winning prank series Anonymous. He later appeared numerous times on RTÉ One's flagship travel show No Frontiers before venturing into his own solo project Baz's Culture Clash on RTÉ Two, which he began filming in September 2008 and finished the following April, travelling the world to film it. It was aired during September and October 2009. It had initially been expected to air in March 2009. For the series Ashmawy visited a coven of witches in Kells, County Meath and underwent hypnosis to allow him to meet his Egyptian ancestors. Ashmawy also visited a haunted house with a group called "Leinster Paranormal". He also teamed up with a group of ghostbusters to visit the haunted Carlow Shopping Centre where a little girl and some former prisoners from the old county jail were among the ghosts which were said to haunt the building. The episode in the shopping centre was filmed at night and in one incident a member of Ashmawy's film crew collapsed without explanation when his body was invaded. In another episode Ashmawy met a man whose diet consisted of roadkill, including badgers and cats. The series was poorly received. Irish Independent critic John Boland wrote of the first episode that it "gives a new meaning to the notion of meaninglessness", and questioned the purpose of a show where Ashmawy "grinned and grimaced his way through southern California in an unserious search of alternative therapies". Hilary Fannin wrote in The Irish Times that a later episode "investigated (well, that might be too strong a word for it – let's say glossed over) the world of the paranormal". Paul Whitington wrote in the Irish Independent that the subjects covered in the series were "new-age nonsense". His next project Baz's Extreme Worlds aired on 10 May 2010.

In addition to appearing on as television host, Ashmawy is an actor who has appeared in television dramas and other programmes. He has also appeared in a plays and short films. Although he says that comedy comes naturally to him, his dramaturgical background has led him to productions of classical theatre and the works of Shakespeare.

In April 2015, Ashmawy hosted the Sky 1 quiz show "Fanatics" where fanatics of various things (e.g. Doctor Who) are tested on their knowledge of these things

=== 50 Ways to Kill Your Mammy ===
The series was born after Ashmawy's mum and co-star Nancy, 72, announced that she wanted to do a skydive. The first series was one of the most watched programmes on Sky 1 in Ireland in 2014; season 2 was considered as delightful as the first.

The show has been licensed by Sky Vision into over 150 territories worldwide, including Canada, Australia, China, and the Middle-East. Local versions of the show have been produced in a number of key territories, including Denmark (two series), Holland and Belgium with several countries picking up the 50 Way to Kill your Mammy format, making this Sky Vision's most successful factual entertainment property to date.

In November 2015 50 Ways to Kill Your Mammy won the Best Non-Scripted Entertainment award at the 2015 International Emmy Awards.

In 2016, Sky 1 aired the 3rd season of the show in a new twist to the show's format, where four new Mammies joined Baz and Nancy on their travels, changing the show to be known as 50 Ways to Kill Your Mammies.

On 12 October 2017, Ashmawy announced on Twitter that he and Nancy would be filming a one off Christmas special broadcast exclusively on RTÉ Ireland. This was followed, on 12 November, by a series of Snapchat videos of Nancy, Baz and the production crew at Dublin airport waiting to fly out to Rome for filming.

=== Faithless TV Series ===
Baz created, wrote and starred in the Faithless; a heartfelt comedy-drama about an ordinary Irish-Egyptian family forced to redefine itself after an unimaginable loss. When Sam Amin (Baz Ashmawy) suddenly finds himself raising his three daughters alone following the death of his wife, he's thrown headfirst into the chaos of single parenthood, grief, identity, and trying to hold a family together when he's barely holding himself together. The series was critically acclaimed and earned Baz an IFTA nomination for Best Script - Drama.

=== Change Your Tune ===
Ashmawy hosted the music game show Change Your Tune that aired on ITV from 1 April to 20 May 2018. Produced by Twofour and filmed at The London Studios, the six-episode series featured some of the UK's worst singers. They received intensive vocal coaching over several weeks to improve, before performing again for a chance to win a £10,000 cash prize.

The show's theme music was composed by Andrei Basirov and Toby Jarvis of A MNEMONIC, with vocals by Nick Cox and Kaia McTernan. Upon debut, it garnered significant attention particularly as many viewers initially believed it to be an elaborate April Fools' Day joke. However, after struggling to attract a sizeable audience (peaking at around 300,000 viewers), ITV rescheduled it to an afternoon slot and ultimately cancelled the show following its first series.

== Radio ==
In July 2017, Ashmawy hosted his radio show That Baz Thing on RTÉ Radio 1. On his show he interviewed different 3 guests every week as he explores a broad range of issues, including parenting, health, happiness and relationships.

Ashmawy co-hosted Weekend Breakfast with Baz & Lucy on RTÉ 2fm with Lucy Kennedy for 2 years.

== Legal Issues ==
=== Arrest and suspension ===
On 4 March 2011, Ashmawy's employer, RTÉ, suspended Mr. Ashmawy for a period of one month following a drink driving incident the previous weekend. His driving licence was suspended for two years as a result of the arrest and conviction

== Opel deal ==
Ashmawy is a "brand ambassador" for Opel, a deal arranged by his agent, Noel Kelly of NK Management. The deal proved controversial as it coincided with revelations about Ryan Tubridy's extra wages and the RTÉ secret payment scandal .

== Personal life ==
He has two daughters Hanna and Mahy. He is also stepfather to four other kids from a previous relationship (Charlotte, Harry, Jake and Amelia). One of his lungs collapsed on a transatlantic flight and he underwent double-lung surgery.
