= Miriam O'Callaghan =

Irish broadcast journalist (born 1960)

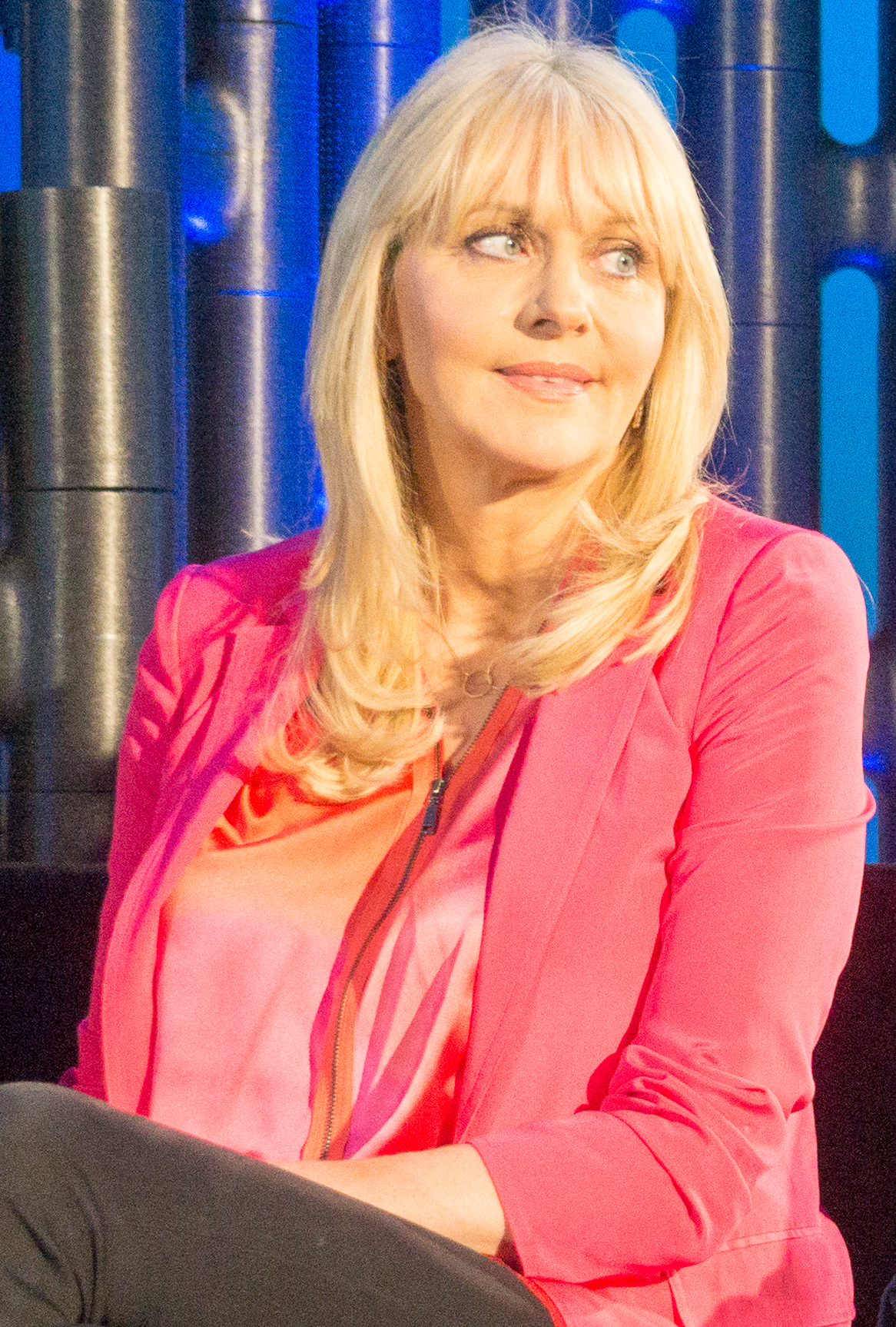
- O'Callaghan in 2015 interview
- Born: 6 January 1960 (age 66); Foxrock, Dublin, Ireland
- Education: Law
- Alma mater: University College Dublin
- Employer: RTÉ
- Spouse(s): Tom McGurk (1983–1995); Steve Carson (2000–present)
- Children: 8
- Relatives: Jim O'Callaghan (brother)

Miriam O'Callaghan (born 6 January 1960) is an Irish television and radio presenter with RTÉ.

O'Callaghan has presented Prime Time since 1996, and her own summer talk show, Saturday Night with Miriam, from 2005 onwards. In the summer of 2009, she began a radio show, Miriam Meets..., since replaced by live show Sunday with Miriam. She is also the first woman to present a full episode of The Late Late Show.

== Early life ==
O'Callaghan received her Bachelor of Civil Law in 1979 and a Diploma in European Law in 1981.

Her brother, politician Jim O'Callaghan is a Fianna Fáil TD and since 24 January 2025 has served as Minister for Justice, Home Affairs and Migration. Her sister, Anne, had cancer and died aged 33.

== Career ==
O'Callaghan worked for British national broadcaster the BBC before returning to Ireland after being headhunted by RTÉ in 1993 to present Marketplace, an economics and business programme. She worked on the first series of ITV's Tonight with Sir Trevor McDonald until 1999. Since 1996, RTÉ secured her services exclusively as the presenter of Prime Time.

In 2005, she began the first series of her own summer talk show, Saturday Night with Miriam. O'Callaghan made her debut as a radio presenter on 11 July 2009 on the programme, Miriam Meets, to run for eight weeks. It was confirmed in August 2009 that the programme would return permanently to RTÉ Radio 1 on Sunday mornings. In 2013, she stood in as a long-term replacement on RTÉ Radio One in the daily morning slot from 9 am to 10 am when presenter John Murray was on extended sick leave. After this she was given a new live Sunday morning radio show on RTÉ Radio One from 10am until 11am called Sunday with Miriam (which she still currently presents each week on the station). She has also covered presented Today on RTÉ Radio 1 during her time with the organisation.

In 2011, O'Callaghan fronted RTÉ's coverage of Queen Elizabeth II's state visit to Ireland in May 2011, and in October of that year hosted the Prime Time debate with the seven candidates standing in the 2011 Irish presidential election. Her treatment of Martin McGuinness resulted in more than 100 complaints to RTÉ.

She hosted RTÉ's 50th anniversary party on New Year's Eve 2011, attended by President of Ireland Michael D. Higgins and Jedward.

During the COVID-19 pandemic, she hosted The Late Late Show when Ryan Tubridy was unavailable. She was the first female presenter of a full episode of the show (Marian Finucane having presented part of an episode on 15 November 1980).

O'Callaghan hosted the RTÉ Leaders Debate for the 2020 Irish general election. RTÉ defended O'Callaghan against accusations of bias, her brother was standing for re-election as a Fianna Fáil candidate. She hosted the final debate of the 2024 Irish general election with government party leaders Taoiseach Simon Harris, Tánaiste Micheál Martin and Leader of the Opposition Mary Lou McDonald.

O'Callaghan's earnings from her work with RTÉ were €307,000 as of 2011, which were reduced to €263,500 as of 2023.

== Marriages and children ==
O'Callaghan married her first husband, Tom McGurk, in 1983 and they separated in 1995 after having four daughters. She met her second husband, Steve Carson, while working on Newsnight. In 2000, they married and set up their own television company, Mint Productions. She has four sons with Carson.

She published her autobiography Miriam: Life, Work, Everything in October 2025.

== Awards ==
In 2003, she won the Television Personality of the Year Award at the Irish Film and Television Awards.

O'Callaghan was awarded an honorary Doctor of Letters (D.Litt.) degree by the Ulster University in Derry on 5 July 2011. University College Cork conferred to her an Honorary Doctor of Laws by University College Cork in June 2017. In 2015, she was awarded UCD Alumnus of the Year in Law from University College Dublin.

She has won the RTÉ Guide Style Award in 2012.
