= List of Irish podcasts =

The following is a list of podcasts (as opposed to radio programmes made for radio and released as podcasts) which are produced either in Ireland or by Irish people internationally.

| Title | Podcaster(s) | Genre | Launched | Ended (paused) | Hosted or produced by | Ref |
|---|---|---|---|---|---|---|
| 5 Minutes to Change Your Life | Joanne Mallon | Self-help | 2021 | | Anchor | |
| Agony Rants | Gearóid Farrelly and Niamh Kavanagh | Comedy | 2021 | | | |
| Basically with Stefanie Preissner | Stefanie Preissner | Current Affairs | 2020 | (2024) | HeadStuff Podcasts | |
| Beo ar Éigean | Siún Ní Dhuinn, Áine Ní Bhreisleáin and Sinéad Ní Uallacháin | Chat (Irish language) | 2017 | (2024) | Raidió Teilifís Éireann | |
| Blow-Ins | Kara Golden and Craig Hunter | Irish Culture | 2024 | | Acast | |
| Climate Alarm Clock Podcast | Darragh Wynne, Anna Pringle, Ciara Daly, Tom Spencer | Climate change | 2021 | | | |
| Double Love | Anna Carey and Karin Moynihan | Literature | 2017 | | HeadStuff Podcasts | |
| Dubland | PJ Gallagher and Suzanne Kane | Comedy | 2015 | (2023) | HeadStuff Podcasts | |
| Enough, with the Science | Joe Brennan and Senan Mahon | Science | 2025 | | | |
| Fad Camp | Grace Mulvey and Conor O'Dowling | Health | 2020 | | HeadStuff Podcasts | |
| Fascinated with Gearóid Farrelly | Gearóid Farrelly | Music | 2014 | (2024) | HeadStuff Podcasts | |
| Fireside | Kevin C. Olohan | Folklore | 2018 | | HeadStuff Podcasts | |
| For Tech's Sake | Elaine Burke and Jenny Darmody | Technology | 2022 | | HeadStuff Podcasts | |
| Here's How | William Campbell | Current Affairs | 2015 | | William Campbell & Kevin Volf | |
| Hold My Drink | Charleen Murphy and Ellie Kelly | Society | 2021 | | GoLoud | |
| I Know That Face | Andrew Carroll and Stephen Porzio | Films, TV | 2019 | | HeadStuff Podcasts | |
| I'm Grand Mam | Kevin Twomey and PJ Kirby | Comedy | 2019 | | | |
| Juvenalia | Alan Maguire and Sarah Maria Griffin | Pop Culture | 2016 | | Tall Tales | |
| Keep It Tight | Emma Doran and Deirdre O'Kane | Comedy | 2024 | | HeadStuff Podcasts | |
| Melody and Witchcraft | Kathryn Petruccelli | Poetry | 2025 | | | |
| Mike & Vittorio's Guide to Parenting | Mike Rice and Vittorio Angelone | Comedy | 2023 | | | |
| Motherfoclóir | Darach Ó Séaghdha | Irish Language | 2017 | | HeadStuff Podcasts | |
| Mothers of Invention | Maeve Higgins and Mary Robinson | Society and Culture | 2018 | (2020) | | |
| My Therapist Ghosted Me | Vogue Williams and Joanne McNally | Comedy | 2021 | | | |
| Personality Bingo with Tom Moran | Tom Moran | Celebrities | 2017 | (2023) | HeadStuff Podcasts | |
| Phoning It In | Dave Coffey | Comedy | 2018 | (2023) | HeadStuff Podcasts | |
| Second Captains | Eoin McDevitt, Ken Early and Ciarán Murphy | Sports | 2013 | | The Irish Times | |
| Sissy That Pod | Cian Sullivan | TV, Pop Culture | 2019 | Jan. 2025 | HeadStuff Podcasts | |
| Talking Ted | Joe Rooney and Patrick McDonnell | TV | 2022 | 2022 | HeadStuff Podcasts | |
| The 2 Johnnies | The 2 Johnnies | Comedy | 2016 | | Spotify | |
| The Baby Tribe | Afif EL-Khuffash and Katie Mugan | Parenting | 2023 | | HeadStuff Podcasts | |
| The Blindboy Podcast | Blindboy | Literature and Comedy | 2017 | | Acast | |
| The Bookshelf with Ryan Tubridy | Ryan Tubridy | Literature | 2024 | | | |
| The Cinemile | Dave Corkery and Cathy Cullen | Films | 2016 | | Acast | |
| The Creep Dive | Sophie White, Jen O’Dwyer and Cassie Delaney | News | 2018 | | Tall Tales | |
| The David McWilliams Podcast | David McWilliams | Economics | 2019 | | Acast | |
| The G Spot | Grace Alice O'Shea | Sex Education | 2024 | | HeadStuff Podcasts | |
| The Green Horizon | Kieran Walsh, Caoimhe Walsh, Amy Jackman, Steven Stubbs, Amy Rothwell, Paul Walsh | Fiction | 2020 | | Faustian Nonsense | |
| The Irish FIRE Podcast | Michael Houghton | Personal Finance | 2019 | | Podbean | |
| The Irish History Podcast | Fin Dwyer | History | 2010 | | Acast | |
| The Irish Mythology Podcast | Marcas Ó hUiscín and Stephanie Ní Thiarnaigh | Mythology | 2019 | (2025) | Anchor | |
| The Irish Passport | Naomi O'Leary and Tim Mc Inerney | Irish Culture | 2017 | | | |
| The Knowledge Master Podcast | Josh Quinn | Self-help | 2021 | (2024) | Podcast Ireland Network | |
| The Lovely Show | Justine Stafford and Kevin McGahern | Comedy | 2024 | | HeadStuff Podcasts | |
| The Michael Anthony Show | Michael Anthony | Multigenre | 2018 | | | |
| The Philosophists | Declan McGrath and Simon Robertson | Philosophy | 2021 | (2023) | The Philosophists | |
| The Stand | Eamon Dunphy | Current Affairs | 2021 | (2024) | Acast | |
| Tony Cantwell's Hit Show | Tony Cantwell | Comedy | 2019 | | HeadStuff Podcasts | |
| Words To That Effect | Conor Reid | Literature | 2017 | 2022 (2024) | HeadStuff Podcasts | |
| Young Hot Guys | Shane Daniel Byrne, Tony Cantwell and Killian Sundermann | Comedy | 2023 | | HeadStuff Podcasts | |
