= The Cafe (2004 talk show) =

Irish talk show

- Genre: Talk show / music / comedy
- Starring: Aidan Power (2004–Finale); Laura Woods (2004–2007); Liam McCormack (2007–2008)
- Country of origin: Ireland
- Original language: English

Production
- Running time: 30 minutes

Original release
- Network: RTÉ Two
- Release: 2004 – 2 April 2010

The Cafe is a talk show aimed at young people in Ireland. The show debuted in 2004. It was broadcast on RTÉ Two each Friday evening at 19:00, having switched from its previous location in the Thursday scheduling from 7 November 2008.

It was presented by Aidan Power, although Laura Woods and Liam McCormack were his previous co-presenters. The waitress was Avril Kelly, who served drinks to the audience and guests and acts as the announcer of what would occur following the commercial break.opening .

Chats were conducted with two or three guests, there were comic inserts and a musical performance rounded off the show (although sometimes a musical performance may have started the show a well). Past guests included Jason Byrne and Donna and Joseph McCaul, PJ Gallagher and Tom McGurk, Glen Wallace and Jennifer Metcalfe, Caroline Morahan, Amanda Byram, Michelle Heaton, Nicola McLean, Daithí Ó Sé, The Kinetiks, The Coronas, Rosanna Davision, Jacob Byrne, Oliver Callan (aka Gay Byrne) and Pat Kenny, wrestlers Scotty 2 Hotty and Joe Legend, The Saw Doctors, panellist John Bishop and Skins actors Mike Bailey, Daniel Kaluuya and Larissa Wilson.

The Cafe completed transmission of its fifth season on 27 March 2009. A sixth season was revealed on 14 August 2009 by Aidan Power to be on the way. The last episode was broadcast on 2 April 2010 due to its axing by RTÉ to make way for new programming.

== Season two ==
Guests in season two included Keith Duffy, Adam Woodyatt, Tony Fenton, Nicholas Hoult, Marty Whelan, Ronnie Drew, Larry Gogan and Liz Bonnin. Music was provided by Turn, Ham Sandwich, Gemma Hayes, Luan Parle, The Answer, Katie Melua and Damien Dempsey.

Date of transmission	Guests	Artist	Song	Details
26 January 2006	Gail Kaneswaren, Críona Grant and Andrea Roche, Bernard Dunne, Keith Duffy	Turn	"It's All About Nothing"	Details
2 February 2006	Kerry Katona, Ruaidhri Conroy, Paul Williams	The Marshals	"Make Her Cry"	Details
9 February 2006	Michelle Heaton and Andy Scott-Lee, Alan Quinlan and Frankie Sheahan	Ham Sandwich	"This Screaming Silence"	Details
16 February 2006	Adam Woodyatt, Gemma Hayes, Anna Nolan	Gemma Hayes	"Undercover"	Details
23 February 2006	David Mitchell and Tony Fenton, You're a Star	Leanne Harte	"Hard to Grasp"	Details
2 March 2006	Linda Martin and Brian Ormond, Nicholas Hoult	George Murphy	"Something Outta Nothing"	Details
9 March 2006	Marty Whelan, Ruaidhri Conroy, Aoife Ní Thuairisg	Stoat	"Acunamanacana"	Details
16 March 2006	Lake Highland Highlandettes, Bláthnaid Ní Chofaigh, Ronnie Drew	Luan Parle	"Failed Romances"	Details
23 March 2006	Lucy Kennedy, Michael McElhatton and Tito Long	The Answer	"Never Too Late"	Details
30 March 2006	Michael Carruth and Emma O'Driscoll, Richie Kavanagh, Larry Gogan	Prison Love		Details
6 April 2006	Journey South, Katie Melua, Louis Walsh	Katie Melua	"Spiders Web"	Details
20 April 2006	Gordon D'Arcy, Damien Dempsey, Liz Bonnin	Damien Dempsey	"Party On"	Details

Exam specials

Date of transmission	Guests	Artist	Song	Details
7 June 2006	Ray D'Arcy, Jason Byrne,^{1} Aslan	Aslan	"Lucy Jones Part 2" and "Different Man"	Details
8 June 2006	Triniti, Jason Byrne, Fiona Looney and Deirdre O'Kane	Triniti and Delorentos	"Rose on Water" and "Leave It On"	Details
9 June 2006	Tom Dunne, Jason Byrne, Pamela Flood	O'Sullivan Brothers	"High"	Details
12 June 2006	Matt Willis, Jack L, Jason Byrne, Paul Byrom	The Saw Doctors	"Your Guitar"	Details
13 June 2006	John Maguire, Jason Byrne, Denis Irwin	Republic of Loose	"Translation"	Details

^{1.} Byrne was hired as a waiter for these five episodes. He served coffee to The Cafe's guests.

== Season three ==
Season three included twenty-seven editions of The Cafe, thirteen of which were in 2006 and fourteen of which were in 2007. Among those to provide music were Director, Messiah J & The Expert, The Frank and Walters, Fionn Regan, The Blizzards, Boss Volenti, The Coronas, Vyvienne Long, Luan Parle, Delorentos, Iain Archer and Royseven

Date of transmission	Guests	Artist	Song	Details
28 September 2006	Spiral, Bernard O'Shea, Sinéad Beirne	Spiral	"So Sexy"	Details
5 October 2006	Oliver Callan, Mickey Harte, Bubble Hits (James Hyland and Lee Walsh)	Mickey Harte	"Can't Let Go"	Details
12 October 2006	Mr. Ireland (Simon Hales), Rasher	In-Flight Safety	"Surround"	Details
19 October 2006	Brent Pope, Bernard O'Shea, Mark Pollock	Director	"Come with a Friend"	Details
26 October 2006	Bronagh Gallagher, Oliver Callan, Irish Ghostbusters	Nylon	"Closer"	Details
2 November 2006	Oliver Callan, Jimmy Magee, Jack Wise	Superjimenez	"Helicopters"	Details
9 November 2006	Oliver Callan, Joe Duffy, Tadhg Kennelly	Messiah J & The Expert	"Something Outta Nothing"	Details
16 November 2006	Fitzy, Karl Spain, Oliver Callan, GP Taylor	The Frank and Walters	"Miles and Miles"	Details
23 November 2006	TJ and TJ, Fair City's Barry, Jo and Heather (Patrick David Nolan, Rachel Sarah Murphy and Una Kavanagh), Kieran Donaghy and Aidan O'Mahony	Republic of Loose	"The Idiots"	Details
30 November 2006	Jason Byrne, Robin Cousins	Neosupervital	"Now That I Found It"	Details
7 December 2006	Gary Cooke, Oliver Callan, Bryan Dobson	Fionn Regan	"Put a Penny in the Slot"	Details
14 (17?) December 2006	Maeve Higgins, Jack Wise, PJ Gallagher	The Charlatans and Jake Stevens	"Blackened Blue Eyes" and "Merry Christmas Jakey Boy"	Details
21 December 2006	Fran Cosgrave, Oliver Callan, Keith Barry	The Blizzards	"Fantasy"	Details
1 January 2007	Oliver Callan as Joe Duffy in an end of year Top 10 review			Details
18 January 2007	Ryan Tubridy, Oliver Callan, Dave Coffey	David Kitt	"One Clear Way"	Details
25 January 2007	Bill O'Herlihy, Oliver Callan, Ben Ramazani	Mista.BNG and Boss Volenti	"Stronger Than Before" and "The Gun"	Details
1 February 2007	Briain Gleeson and Charlene Gleeson and Tara Leinston (Trouble in Paradise), Oliver Callan, Eamon Horan and Brendan Fanning	The Coronas	"Decision Time"	Details
8 February 2007	Derval O'Rourke, Oliver Callan, Blind Date	Vyvienne Long	"She Wants to Move"	Details
15 February 2007	Blind Date Catch Up, Dáithí Ó Sé, TJ and TJ, Monica Loughman	Luan Parle	"Make It on My Own"	Details
22 February 2007	Oliver Callan, Keith Duffy and Brian Ormond, TJ and TJ, Paul Howard	My Alamo	"1994"	Details
1 March 2007	Louis Walsh, Kevin J Ryan, Bernard O'Shea, Manchán Magan	Delorentos	"Basis of Everything"	Details
8 March 2007	Colm & Jim-Jim, Oliver Callan, Baz/Michael/Mark (How Low Can You Go?)	Iain Archer	"Minus Ten"	Details
15 March 2007	James Alexandrou, TJ and TJ, Oliver Callan, You're a Star	Royseven	"Crash"	Details
22 March 2007	Caroline Morahan, TJ and TJ, Raj Khan, Oliver Callan, Gavin McConnon and Emmet O'Brien	The Cooper Temple Clause	"Waiting Game"	Details
29 March 2007	Lucy Kennedy, Bernard O'Shea, George McMahon, Oliver Callan, Gavin McConnon and Emmet O'Brien	J-90	"Freak"	Details
12 April 2007	Ken Doherty, Oliver Callan, Bernard Dunne	Discovery Gospel Choir and The Rags	"I Still Haven't Found; What I'm Looking For" and "Monsters & I"	Details
19 April 2007	Brian McFadden, Oliver Callan, Don Wycherley	Brian McFadden	"Like Only a Woman Can" and "Jones"	Details

The Best of the Cafe

Throughout June and July 2007, RTÉ broadcast six special editions of The Cafe. These included past interviews and performances.

Date of transmission	Guests	Artist	Song	Details
3 June 2007	The Best of the Cafe 1 (Ryan Tubridy, James Alexandrou, Brian Ormond, Keith Duffy, Bernard Dunne)	Director/Delorentos	"Come With a Friend"/"Basis of Everything"	Details
10 June 2007	The Best of the Cafe 2 (Louis Walsh, Keith Duffy, Karl Spain, Jimmy Magee, the boys from How Low Can You Go?)	Discovery Gospel Choir/The Charlatans	"I Still Haven't Found What I'm Looking For"/"Blackened Blue Eyes"	Details
17 June 2007	The Best of the Cafe 3 (Lucy Kennedy, Tadhg Kennelly, Fran Cosgrave, Manchán Magan)	Iain Archer/The Frank and Walters	"Minus Ten"/"Miles and Miles"	Details
24 June 2007	The Best of the Cafe 4 (Jason Byrne, Brent Pope, Oliver Callan, Dáithí Ó Sé, Derval O'Rourke, TJ and TJ)	Messiah J & The Expert/Brian McFadden	"Something Outta Nothing"/?	Details
4 July 2007	The Best of the Cafe 5 (Ken Doherty, Maeve Higgins, PJ Gallagher, Don Wycherley, Keith Barry)	Fionn Regan/The Blizzards	"Put a Penny in the Slot"/"Fantasy"	Details
8 July 2007	The Best of the Cafe 6 (Caroline Morahan, Bill O'Herlihy, Bryan Dobson, Brian McFadden)	David Kitt/Royseven	"One Clear Way"/"Crash"	Details

== Season four ==
For season four, Aidan Power's co-presenter Laura Woods left for pastures new and was replaced by Liam McCormack. On 25 October Ziggy Lichman guest presented instead of Aidan Power, alongside Liam McCormack. The opening sequence also changed to feature past guests such as The Blizzards, Lucy Kennedy and Ken Doherty in black and white. Among those to provide music were Duke Special, Messiah J and the Expert, The Flaws, Declan O'Rourke, Republic of Loose, East 17, Juno Falls, David Geraghty and Seasick Steve.

Date of transmission	Guests	Artist	Song	Details
27 September 2007	Caroline Morahan and Pamela Flood (Off the Rails), Fran Dempsey (Fortycoats), Tom McGurk	The Radio	"Manmade"	Details
4 October 2007	Ziggy Lichman and Carole Vincent (Big Brother 8)	Carole and Duke Special	"Stairway to Heaven" and "Our Love Goes Deeper Than This"	Details
11 October 2007	Joe O'Shea, Mary Fitzgerald	Dan le sac vs Scroobius Pip	"The Beat That My Heart Skipped"	Details
18 October 2007	Brian Belo, Orlaith McAllister	Messiah J and the Expert	"Super Famous Super Tune"	Details
25 October 2007	Keith Barry, Brian Dowling	The Flaws	"You & I"	Details
1 November 2007	Daithí O'Sé and Michael Healy-Rae, Tabby Callaghan	The Mitchell Brothers	"Michael Jackson"	Details
8 November 2007	Sinéad Moynihan and Anthony Quinlan (Hollyoaks), Evanne Ní Chuilinn	Declan O'Rourke	"Whatever Else Happens"	Details
22 November 2007	Brian Ormond, Jimmy Magee	Republic of Loose	"Break"	Details
29 November 2007	Mario Rosenstock, Dave Duffy and Jenny Kavanagh (Fair City)	Dry County	"Another Idea"	Details
6 December 2007	Andrew Maxwell, Damian Clark and Andrew Stanley (I Dare Ya)	Ash	"You Can't Have It All"	Details
13 December 2007	Bláthnaid Ní Chofaigh and Derek Mooney (Echo Island), Oliver Callan	East 17	"Stay Another Day"	Details
20 December 2007	Dean Gaffney, GAA All Stars, Mary Fitzgerald and Kathryn McKiernan, Six members	GAA All Stars	"Over the Rooftops"	Details
10 January 2008	Rachel Allen, Rhino and Jet (Gladiators)	Smoke Feathers		
17 January 2008	Charley Boorman, Katherine Lynch	Super Extra Bonus Party	"Favourite Things"	Details
24 January 2008	Keith Duffy/Michelle Heaton/Brendan O'Connor (You're a Star), Hope	Hope/Juno Falls	"Umbrella"/"This Song is Your Own"	Details
31 January 2008	Louis Walsh, Ryle Nugent and Reggie Corrigan	Kano	"Feel Free"	Details
7 February 2008	Susan McFadden, Matt Littler and Darren Jon-Jeffries (Hollyoaks)	Jenny Lindfors	"Timewarp"	Details
14 February 2008	Brendan Cole, Holly Brisley	David Geraghty	"Kaleidoscope"	Details
21 February 2008	Ritchie Neville and Scott Robinson (Five), Michael Winslow	Seasick Steve	"Cut My Wings"	Details
28 February 2008	Sinead Kennedy, Chico	Paddy Casey	"Not Out to Get You"	Details
6 March 2008	Eoghan Harris and Tom Ó Brannagáin (Glas Vegas), Timmy Mallett and Pippa O'Connor/Rosanna Davison	Noise Control	"We Like Music"	Details
13 March 2008	Kathryn Thomas, Krump Dancers, Chris Doran, You're a Star finalists			Details
27 March 2008	Francesca Martinez, Gordon D'Arcy and Paul Howard	Autamata	"What You All About?"	Details
4 April 2008	Mike Bailey/Larissa Wilson/Daniel Kaluuya (Skins), Aoibhinn Ní Shúilleabháin (Celebrity Bainisteoir)	Nizlopi	"Start Beginning"	Details
11 April 2008	Shayne Ward, Matt Di Angelo, Mikey Graham and Joe McKinney (Hollywood Trials), Dustin the Turkey	Shayne Ward	"You Got Me So"	Details

The Cafe Select

Throughout June, July and into August 2008, RTÉ broadcast six special editions of The Cafe. These included past interviews and performances.

Date of transmission	Guests	Artist	Song	Details
29 June 2008	The Café Select 1 with Louis Walsh, Holly Brisley, the Hollyoaks Boys, Brian Belo	Republic of Loose/Seasick Steve		Details
6 July 2008	The Café Select 2 with Matt Di Angelo, Six, Keith Barry, Duke Special and the Mitchell Brothers			Details
13 July 2008	The Café Select 3 with Dean Gaffney, Francesca Martinez, East 17 and Shayne Ward			Details
20 July 2008	The Café Select 4 with Andrew Maxwell, Declan O'Rourke, the boys from Hollyoaks and Dan le Sac			Details
27 July 2008	The Café Select 5 with Rachel Allen, Brian Dowling, Paul Howard, Gordon D'Arcy and others	Paddy Casey		Details
3 August 2008	The Café Select 6 with Kathryn Thomas, Timmy Mallett, Michael Winslow, Mikey Graham	Hope/ Super Extra Bonus Party		Details

== Season five ==
For season five, Aidan Power's co-presenter Liam McCormack left for pastures new and wasn't replaced as Power became the show's sole presenter. The 7 November episode marked the beginning of Friday broadcasts, this change would remain in effect until the programme's end in 2010. Among those to provide music were Republic of Loose, The Flaws, Fight Like Apes, Ham Sandwich, The Blizzards and The Coronas.

Olympian Kenny Egan produced his silver medal. Economist George Lee was shown predicting doom and gloom sixteen years earlier Pat Kenny featured on the night of The Late Late Toy Show where he encountered the mimicry of Oliver Callan who took on the persona of Kenny and his predecessor Gay Byrne. Ryle Nugent guested on 20 March 2009 to talk about Ireland's attempt to win the 2009 Six Nations Championship Grand Slam. The final episode of the fifth series was broadcast on 27 March 2009, featuring guests Eamon Dunphy and John Bishop, with music from Republic of Loose and a new Louis Walsh girlband.

Date of transmission	Guests	Artist	Song	Details
25 September 2008	Brendan Courtney, Gemma Bissix	Republic of Loose	"The Ritual"	Details
2 October 2008	Kenny Egan, Cadbury's gorilla, Charlene McKenna and Liam Garrigan (Raw)	Mundy	"January is Blue"	
9 October 2008	Keith Duffy and Mikey Graham, Nam the Man, Amy Huberman	The Flaws	"Idolise"	Details
16 October 2008	Gráinne and Síle Seoige, Mohammed George	Fight Like Apes	"Jake Summers"	Details
30 October 2008	George Lee, Lucy Kennedy	Dirty Epics	"Way Too Pretty"	
7 November 2008	Simon Delaney, Paddy Courtney	The Saw Doctors	"About You Now"	Details
14 November 2008	Hilda Fay, John Bishop	Ham Sandwich	"Broken Glass"	Details
21 November 2008	Colm & Jim-Jim, Dan O'Connor	The Blizzards	"The Reason"	
28 November 2008	Pat Kenny, Oliver Callan	General Fiasco	"Rebel Get By"	
5 December 2008	Andrew Maxwell, Susan McFadden	Keywest	"Damn"	Details
12 December 2008	Jason Byrne, Rosanna Davison	The Coronas	"San Diego Song"/"Heroes or Ghosts"	Details
19 December 2008	Louis Walsh, Vanessa Feltz	Boogie Nights	"Merry Xmas Everybody"	
9 January 2009	The Cheeky Girls, Andrew Stanley and Damian Clark	Aslan	"Crazy World"/"Jealous Little Thing"	Details
16 January 2009	Daithí Ó Sé, Nicola McLean	The Kinetiks	"Lightbulb"	Details
23 January 2009	George McMahon, Bernard O'Shea and Laura Way	Pony Club	"Diplomat"	Details
30 January 2009	Michelle Heaton, Amanda Byram	Fred	"The Lights"	Details
6 February 2009	Denis Hickie, Sarah Morrissey/Pippa O'Connor/Jenny Lee Masterson	Noise Control	"Addiction"	Details
13 February 2009	Glen Wallace and Jennifer Metcalfe (Hollyoaks), Caroline Morahan	Jack L		Details
20 February 2009	Samanda, Bláthnaid Ní Chofaigh	Cowboy X	"Break Me"	Details
27 February 2009	PJ Gallagher, Tom McGurk	Sinéad Mulvey & Black Daisy/Joe Echo	"Et Cetera"/"If I Were a Boy"	Details
6 March 2009	Jason Byrne, Donna and Joseph McCaul	N-Dubz/Ham Sandwich	"Click... Click... Boom!!!" (as Gaeilge)	Details
13 March 2009	Aidan Bishop, Nicky Hambleton-Jones	The Blizzards/The Infomatics	"Postcards"/"Rave Up"	Details
20 March 2009	Ryle Nugent, Lisa Rogers	Super Extra Bonus Party	"Tea with Lord Haw Haw"	Details
27 March 2009	Eamon Dunphy, John Bishop	Louis Walsh girlband/Republic of Loose		Details

== Season six ==
Keith Duffy appeared to promote the stage show My First Time; this was cancelled after the sudden death of fellow Boyzone member Stephen Gately the following day.

Guests on the final episode, aired on 26 March 2010, were Katie Taylor, Daithi O'Se, Kathryn Thomas, Andrew Stanley and Dustin the Turkey, with music from Smash Hits and Beardyman.
