= Féile =

Féile is an Irish word meaning festival (see also Category:Festivals in Ireland). This may refer to:

- Féile an Phobail, August arts festival in West Belfast
  - Féile FM, radio station during the festival
- Féile (music festival), a music event held annually 1990–97, and again in 2018, usually in Thurles, County Tipperary
- Féile na nGael, GAA youth jamboree and tournaments
- River Feale (Abhainn na Féile) in west Munster
- Soma Festival (Féile Soma) in Castlewellan, County Down
