= Merry Christmas Jakey Boy =

Single by Jake Stevens

from the album -
- Released: December 2006
- Recorded: 2006
- Genre: Rock
- Length: 3:35

"Merry Christmas Jakey Boy"

"Merry Christmas Jakey Boy" is a single released exclusively for the Irish market in December 2006 by Jake Stevens. Stevens is an alter ego of the comedian PJ Gallagher who features in the popular RTÉ Two hidden camera/comedy style television series, Naked Camera. The Jakey Boy in the song's title refers obviously to Stevens himself. The single reached number nine in the Irish Singles Chart and was performed on a number of television shows including The Cafe and Tubridy Tonight.

== Chart performance ==
"Merry Christmas Jakey Boy" featured in the Irish Singles Chart, where it remained listed for a total of four weeks in the Ireland Singles Top 50. The song entered the charts for the first time in the forty-ninth week of the year 2006 at a position of #11, making its final appearance on the fifty-second and final week of that year. It peaked at #9, and remained at this point for two weeks of its tenure in the Irish Singles Chart.

In December 2019, PJ Gallagher revealed the chart performance of the single was compromised by the fact he accidentally scheduled the single to be released on iTunes on 12/01/2007 rather than 01/12/2006.

Chart (2006)	Peak position
Irish Singles Chart	9

== Television performances ==
"Merry Christmas Jakey Boy" was performed by PJ Gallagher (as his alter ego Jake Stevens) on at least two television shows, the youth programme The Cafe and the primetime chat show Tubridy Tonight. The Cafe performance came on 14 December 2006, following a guest appearance by Gallagher alongside his Naked Camera colleague Maeve Higgins and the corporate magician Jack Wise. UK band The Charlatans also performed their single "Blackened Blue Eyes" on the same show. The Tubridy Tonight performance saw Stevens engage with the audience as the credits rolled.
