= Laugh at the Bank =

Laugh at the Bank character, used annually for the festival logo

Laugh at the Bank is an annual weekend comedy festival founded in 2009 by Féile an Phobail in Belfast, Northern Ireland. The festival runs over the Spring Bank Holiday in May and features comedians from around the world. The festival also features charitable events such as Bull Runs.

== History ==
In December 2008, Féile an Phobail, an arts organisation which runs four – five festivals a year, traditionally based in west Belfast, began planning the first dedicated weekend comedy festival in the city. The first festival was featured highly in the media in publications such as Hot Press and Irish national newspapers.

== Line-up ==
=== 2009 ===
Laugh at the Bank ran from 22–24 May 2009. The line-up and events included:

- PJ Gallagher
- Kevin McAleer
- Sean Hughes
- Willa White
- Bull Run (in aid of CLIC Sargent Northern Ireland)

=== 2010 ===
Laugh at the Bank ran from 27–30 May 2010. The line-up and events included:

- Paul Tonkinson
- Karl Spain
- Neil Delamere
- Bernard O'Shea
- Matt Reed
- Aidan Bishop
- Gemma Hutton
- Laugh 4 Haiti (featuring over 30 comedians in aid of victims of the 2010 Haiti earthquake)
