= Jakey Boy =

Jakey Boy may refer to the following:

- Jake Stevens, an Irish television personality and musician
- "Merry Christmas Jakey Boy", a top ten Christmas single released by Stevens
