= Jake Stevens =

Fictional Irish television personality

- First appearance: Naked Camera (2005)
- Last appearance: Makin' Jake (2008)
- Created by: Scratch Productions / RTÉ
- Portrayed by: PJ Gallagher

In-universe information
- Occupation: Television personality Musician
- Nationality: Irish

Jake Stevens is a fictional Irish television personality and musician portrayed by the comedian PJ Gallagher. He first featured in the popular RTÉ Two hidden camera television series, Naked Camera. Stevens later achieved his own spin-off show Makin' Jake which documented his efforts to conquer the United States. He has released one single "Merry Christmas Jakey Boy", which reached number nine in the Irish Singles Chart in December 2006. Stevens performed the single on The Cafe and Tubridy Tonight.

== Style ==
Stevens is known for his "shiny-suited persona" and characteristic trait of whistling whilst waving a wet newspaper around with his hand and yelling such explicit catchphrases as "I need a fuckin' job" or threatening to "bend you over and rip down your jocks and shove a spoon up yer hole." He wears white socks and chunky catalogue jewellery and is said to be "bound up in manic egotism and dangerous idiocy".

== Career ==
=== Early career ===
Stevens began his television career in 2005 on the popular RTÉ Two hidden camera/comedy style television series, Naked Camera where he featured alongside other characters such as Jumperman and the Dirty Auld Wan. For the show he ambushed ordinary members of the general public as they went about their everyday business, making them feel uncomfortable and embarrassed for comedic results.

=== Christmas single ===
In 2006 Stevens released the single "Merry Christmas Jakey Boy" exclusively for the Irish Christmas market. It peaked at #9 and was performed by Stevens on a number of television shows, including the youth programme The Cafe and the primetime chat show Tubridy Tonight. The Cafe performance came on 14 December 2006, following a guest appearance by Gallagher alongside his Naked Camera colleague Maeve Higgins and the corporate magician Jack Wise. UK band The Charlatans also performed their single "Blackened Blue Eyes" on the same show. The Tubridy Tonight performance saw Stevens engage with the audience as the credits rolled.

=== U.S. conquest ===
Stevens travelled across the United States in 2008 for the filming of his television series Makin' Jake. His attempts to conquer the country were somewhat unsuccessful, being shunned in the cities of Los Angeles, California, Nashville, Tennessee, San Francisco, California and New York City. Stevens had received acting tips from A-list performers including Erik Estrada (CHiPs) and Lou Ferrigno (the original Incredible Hulk) before his attempts to conquer the country.

== Discography ==
Year	Title	Peak chart position
2006	"Merry Christmas Jakey Boy"	9
