= Féile an Phobail =

Arts festival in Northern Ireland

Coordinates: 54.5919°N 5.9623°W

- Genre: Music; Irish traditional music, rock, indie rock, world, folk, ska Other; Debate, Irish dancing, Irish literature, humanitarianism
- Dates: Various (see #Festivals)
- Locations: Belfast, Northern Ireland
- Years active: 1988–Present
- Founders: Gerry Adams MP, Danny Morrison
- Website: Official website

Féile an Phobail (The Community's Festival), also known as the West Belfast Festival, is a community arts organisation known for its August Féile (Festival). The organisation is prominent for its promotion of Irish and international culture. The festival takes place on and around Falls Road in Belfast, Northern Ireland.

== History ==
=== Foundations ===
The festival was established in 1988 in response to the Troubles, particularly the violent events in west Belfast during March of that year. It was founded in part to challenge negative portrayals of west Belfast and to present a more positive image of the local community.

A small amount of friends and various local groups came together to organise a community festival in order to celebrate the creativity, energy, passion for the arts and sport that existed in West Belfast. The Féile was, and is, aimed at providing events and entertainment at a price that the majority of the community could afford.

In August 1988 the first festival opened with a small parade of floats and bands and Gaelic Athletic Association clubs walking in their club regalia to an open-air party in Dunville Park. Street parties were organised throughout the west of the city. Door-to-door collections were made to fund day trips to the seaside for pensioners and outings for young people.

=== Present ===
Féile an Phobail has been praised as one of the largest community festivals in Europe. The carnival parade routinely brings together over 20,000 participants for a colourful, musical procession with specially designed floats representing a chosen theme, dancers and children in costume and face-masks.

It has grown from a one-week festival to a year-round programme with many events. It established the first ever children's arts festival in Northern Ireland, the Draíocht Children's Arts Festival, with activities ranging from sports to multi-cultural and educational events through both Irish and English. In 2003, 6,000 children and young people participated in Draíocht events.

The festival also has its own radio station, Féile FM. The station initially broadcast across Belfast for two one-month periods in the spring and summer, during which young volunteers were professionally trained in media and management skills for free. In 2007, the radio was successful in securing a full-time licence, and now broadcasts seven days a week, throughout Belfast. Some trainees have gone on to find employment in the local media, including UTV, BBC Northern Ireland and Irish News Online in Belfast.

In May 2009, Féile an Phobail launched Belfast's first dedicated comedy festival, Laugh at the Bank.

During the 15 August 2021 event, DUP councilors called for public funding to be stopped due to pro-IRA chanting during The Wolfe Tones performance.

=== Festivals ===
Féile an Phobail runs numerous festivals throughout the year. Among the festivals are:

- August Féile (Féile Lúnasa) – oldest project. Among Europe's largest community festivals, runs in August
- Féile an Earraigh – Springtime Irish traditional music festival
- Draíocht – annual children's festival beginning in mid-October
- Stand up in the West – monthly comedy night in Belfast's Western Bar, no longer running
- Laugh at the Bank – Belfast's first comedy festival. Launched May 2009

== Performers ==
Féile an Phobail has rostered national and international acts to perform with local musicians, catering for all tastes in dancing and music: from Irish traditional music to world music and pop. Notable acts include Altan, Brian Kennedy, Mary Black, the Afro-Cuban All Stars, the Harlem Gospel Choir, Westlife and Status Quo.

Local poets and writers have read their works on the same podium as renowned authors such as Patrick Mc Cabe, Roddy Doyle and Evelyn Conlon. In the early years drama was to the fore and the festival hosted work from some of Ireland's leading playwrights and theatre companies, such as Frank McGuinness's Someone Who'll Watch Over Me and, in 1994, Marie Jones' A Night in November by Dubbeljoint Productions.

Discussion and debates have included talks by world-class journalists and documentary makers including Robert Fisk (The Independent), Michael Moore (Oscar Winner). In the years just before and immediately after the Good Friday Agreement when few unionist and nationalist politicians appeared together in public for debate, the annual West Belfast Talks Back afforded such an opportunity, for example in 2003 Gregory Campbell (Democratic Unionist Party) spoke on the same panel as Alex Maskey (Sinn Féin).

In 2015 the Chief Constable of the PSNI spoke on a panel discussion at the Féile where he stressed the need for courage in facing the past. George Hamilton (Northern Ireland police officer) appeared alongside Martin McGuiness, an unthinkable line-up in the early years of the Féile.

=== List of notable performers/speakers ===
Artists		Speakers	Comedians
Westlife	Hothouse Flowers	Sunny Jacobs	Ardal O'Hanlon
Girls Aloud	Jerry Fish & The Mudbug Club	Gerry Adams	PJ Gallagher
Atomic Kitten	Kaiser Chiefs	Danny Morrison	Sean Hughes
Mairéad Ní Mhaonaigh	Mundy	Gregory Campbell	Tim McGarry
Mary Black	Duke Special	Alex Maskey	Pauline McLynn
Harlem Gospel Choir	The Proclaimers	Edwin Poots	Alexei Sayle
Altan	Damien Dempsey	Caitríona Ruane	Mark Steel
Status Quo	Luka Bloom	Jeffrey Donaldson	Neil Delamere
Afro-Cuban All Stars	Javine	Billy McQuiston	Karl Spain
Hazel O'Connor	Blazin' Squad	Dawn Purvis	Paul Tonkinson
Lúnasa	Afro Celt Sound System	Martin McGuinness	Lenny Henry
At First Light	The Gangsters	Sean Crummey
Frances Black	Gráda	William Crawley
Kieran Goss	Samantha Mumba	Mary McAleese
Brian Kennedy	Christy Moore	Love Music Hate Racism
Neil Hannon	Austin Drage	Robert Fisk
Penguin Cafe Orchestra	Chumbawamba	Ian Paisley Jr
Peatbog Faeries		Seamus Heaney
		Jeremy Corbyn

=== Other ===
Féile an Phobail has hosted notable artists and painters from Ireland and abroad and hosts a festival-long exhibition in St. Mary's University College. Other community exhibitions take place around West Belfast, organised by community groups in association with the August Féile.
