= Naked Camera =

- Created by: Scratch Productions/RTÉ
- Starring: PJ Gallagher; Patrick McDonnell; Maeve Higgins
- Country of origin: Republic of Ireland
- No. of series: 3
- No. of episodes: 18

Production
- Running time: 24 minutes per episode

Original release
- Network: RTÉ Two
- Release: 20 September 2005 – 30 April 2007

Naked Camera is a hidden camera comedy television show which began airing on RTÉ Two in 2005. Set and filmed in the Republic of Ireland (mostly in Dublin), its concept is similar to that of the UK show Trigger Happy TV or the ascendant candid camera elements of The Live Mike. Comedians PJ Gallagher, Patrick McDonnell, and Maeve Higgins wrote the scripts and portrayed the sketch characters. Produced by Scratch Productions for RTÉ, the third and concluding series aired in February 2007.

== Character list ==
There follows a list of recurring characters, the most noteworthy of which is Jake Stevens. Other characters appeared occasionally.

Gallagher

Role	Actor
Jake Stevens	PJ Gallagher
Jumperman	PJ Gallagher
English Geezer	PJ Gallagher
The Fixer	PJ Gallagher
Henry Gordon	PJ Gallagher
The Dirty Auld Wan	PJ Gallagher

McDonnell

Role	Actor
Clifford Crawford the Orangeman	Patrick McDonnell
The pernicidy park-keeper	Patrick McDonnell
Dutch Tourist	Patrick McDonnell
The Traffic Warden/Security guard	Patrick McDonnell
US Tourist	Patrick McDonnell

Higgins

Role	Actor
Lois Mooney	Maeve Higgins
Lily the Beautician	Maeve Higgins
Sinead, The Desperate Traffic Warden	Maeve Higgins
Unorthodox hairdresser	Maeve Higgins

== Crew ==
A crew of five members stayed incognito at all times during filming.

Director	Producer	Production	Sound	Camera
Liam McGrath	Tony Deegan	Michael O Reilly	Ray Cross	Emmet Harte

== Celebrity appearances ==
A number of celebrities made accidental and unsolicited appearances during the third series of Naked Camera. These included the rugby analyst and radio presenter George Hook, the professional taxi person Tommy Gorman, the blues musician Don Baker and the association football presenter Bill O'Herlihy. Each was singled out in a taxi.

== Makin' Jake ==
Jake Stevens later received his own spin-off show, Makin' Jake, which commenced broadcasting on RTÉ Two in January 2008. It was not commissioned for a second series.

Similar to other comedic acts in Ireland (Dustin the Turkey, Pat Shortt and Richie Kavanagh), Stevens had earlier released a Christmas single "Merry Christmas Jakey Boy" in 2006. He performed this single on The Cafe and Tubridy Tonight in December of that year.
