= Gearóid Farrelly =

Irish comedian and actor (born 1977)

- Born: 10 October 1977 (age 48); Finglas, Dublin, Ireland
- Occupation: Comedian
- Known for: The Panel; Craig Doyle Live; Meet Your Neighbours

Gearóid Farrelly (born 10 October 1977) is an Irish comedian, podcaster and actor.

== Career ==
He was a finalist in So You Think You're Funny and the winner of the Bulmers Nuthin' Butt Funny Comedy Award, which earned him supporting acts with Rich Hall and Michael Winslow as part of the Bulmer's Comedy festival. In October 2008 he performed at the Cologne Comedy Festival in Germany. He made his debut at the Carlsberg Comedy Festival in Iveagh Gardens in 2008 and at The Cat Laughs Festival, Kilkenny in 2010.

In November 2009, he previewed an hour solo show "The Awkward, In-Between Stage" and was the support act for Maeve Higgins "Blabbing Away" national tour in 2010, followed by dates for Tommy Tiernan in August and closing out 2010 on PJ Gallagher's tour in December.

For two years he had a weekly comedy slot on the I105-107FM Breakfast Show on Tuesdays where he gave breakfast hosts Keith Walsh and Bernard O'Shea his take on the world. His last appearances on the show were January 2011.

In 2010, he was a recurring panelist on RTÉ One's The Panel and was featured in Top TV Moments of 2010 on TV3. In 2011 he supported Tommy Tiernan in the Iveagh Gardens, began touring his new solo show "Turbulence" and started work on a TV pilot with PJ Gallagher. The pilot was commissioned in early 2011 and became Meet Your Neighbours. In June 2011 he filmed a slot for "One Night Stand" for the UK channel Dave and was the support for Neil Delamere's Restructuring tour which continued until May 2013.

In early 2012 Farrelly appeared in the pilot for Craig Doyle Live a twice weekly entertainment panel show. He appeared on the show weekly, contributing to the celebrity interviews and news review. The show was met with mixed reviews and healthy audience figures. In March 2012 he began a weekly comedy spot on the 98fm Morning Crew, providing clueless soap updates and TV commentary to hosts Aidan Power and Claire Solan who occasionally turned the tables on him.

In 2012 he did his first solo run at the Edinburgh Fringe, after which he supported Joan Rivers on her "Now or Never Tour" for the Dublin shows and for her show in Brighton which was recorded as part of her reality show Joan & Melissa: Joan Knows Best?.

In 2013 he opened for Neil Delamere on his "Delamere Mortal" tour.

His podcast, 'Fascinated', launched in January 2014 and has featured interviews with Carnie Wilson of Wilson Phillips, Kelle Bryan and James Dreyfus. He also launched the podcast "Agony Rants" with Niamh Kavanagh in 2021. Both podcasts are part of the HeadStuff Podcast Network.

Television writing credits include An Audience with Katherine Lynch and Republic of Telly, and he has appeared on The Lucy Kennedy Show (Panelist), The Savage Eye, Tonight with Craig Doyle and The Panel.

Farrelly is openly gay.
