= Nob Nation =

- RTÉ Supporting the Nobs
- Genre: Satirical comedy
- Running time: 3-5mins
- Country of origin: Ireland
- Language: English
- Home station: RTÉ 2fm
- Starring: Oliver Callan
- Announcer: Gerry Ryan
- Original release: November 2006 – present
- Website: rte.ie/2fm/nobnation/ www.nobnation.com
- Podcast: rte.ie/radio1/podcast/podcast_nobnation.xml

Nob Nation is the title of a series of topical comedy pieces broadcast since November 2006 on two national radio stations in Ireland, RTÉ 2fm and RTÉ Radio 1. The programmes are broadcast Monday through Saturday each week. Nob Nation is written and produced by Oliver Callan.

The series features almost 100 characters, including BIFFO, Dame Enda, Garret FitzGerald, and others based on people from Irish and international public life involved in politics, sport and entertainment. All voice acting is performed by Callan. Two CDs of Nob Nation sketches have been released, in 2007 and a follow-up in 2008.

In 2011, RTÉ paid defamation damages to an 84-year-old gentleman after Nob Nation inaccurately claimed he was running a brothel.

== Background ==
Originally broadcast on The Derek Mooney Show on RTÉ Radio 1 and subsequently on the 2fm Breakfast Show, the sketches were moved to just after the 10:00 news on The Gerry Ryan Show on RTÉ 2fm in January 2007. Nob Nation was then repeated at night on Damien Farrelly's The Frequency on 2FM. One comedy sketch was selected and was featured on Playback on Radio One on Saturday mornings and on The Saturday Show on 2fm on Saturday afternoons. It has also featured on Ireland's most popular radio show, Morning Ireland, on RTÉ Radio 1.

Nob Nation was reported in the Sunday Independent on 20 January 2008 as being Ireland's most popular podcast of the previous year, with figures showing a total of 736,711 downloads on RTÉ.ie between April and December 2007. Nob Nation also features prominently on the iTunes free podcast chart. Following a number of complaints about Callan's portrayal of Taoiseach Brian Cowen "swaying and snorting in booze-filled sing-songs about his difficulties in office", the popularity of the slot has "simply exploded" according to RTÉ, with over 250,000 hits each month and making up almost a third of all downloads from RTÉ.ie.

In January 2009, Nob Nation satirised the RTÉ staff pay cut controversy by suggesting Gerry Ryan would try to get out of taking a pay cut by broadcasting for longer but without charging extra for it and that Pat Kenny would contribute to the economy by doing a nixer for free in the RTÉ canteen – to the dismay of all who preferred their full Irish breakfast to the delicacies favoured by the Kenny palate.

== CD releases ==
The first Nob Nation CD, containing twenty sketches, was released in Ireland on 2 November 2007. Those parodied on the compilation include politicians Bertie Ahern and Enda Kenny, former Republic of Ireland national football team manager Steve Staunton, broadcaster Gay Byrne and newsreaders Bryan Dobson and Colm Murray. The album reached number 5 on the Irish Albums Chart on 9 November 2007, according to IRMA, the official chart tracking body in Ireland.

A second compilation, Nob Nation 2: The Recession Album, was released on 7 November 2008. And a third album "Nob Nation Uncensored" was released in the Irish Daily Mail in November 2009, containing tracks not previously broadcast and a series of sketches that had not been played on RTÉ.

== Live performances ==
Nob Nation has featured on RTÉ Television's prime time chat shows Tubridy Tonight and The Late Late Show. In December 2007 Callan was introduced by then Taoiseach Bertie Ahern to perform at Fianna Fáil's Cairde Fáil dinner. Callan performed a number of acts at the dinner, including mimicking Ahern himself. In February 2008 Callan also performed a live show at Ógra Fianna Fáil's National Youth Conference. In 2008 a debut Irish live show was commissioned as part of the Bulmers International Comedy Festival. Callan performed his pieces in Dublin's Olympia Theatre on 6 September 2008.

== Defamation case ==
An 84-year-old guesthouse owner of the Maryland in the city sued RTÉ over a Nob Nation sketch claiming it claimed he was running a brothel in County Waterford. His Senior Counsel warned the jury before the sketch was played to them that they might wince as, he said, it was the "most vulgar type of broadcast imaginable". The court awarded €70,000 damages.
