= BEO =

BEO, Beo, BeO or variation may refer to:

BEO

- Banquet event order
- Belmont Airport IATA code
- Beyond Earth Orbit
- Black Equity Organisation
- Book entry only

Beo

- Beo, a variant of the name of the Anglo-Saxon god Beowa.
- Beo language, an African language
- Beo ar Éigean, an Irish-language podcast and radio programme

BeO

- beryllium oxide (BeO)

== See also ==
- Beos (disambiguation)
