= Beos =

Beos may refer to:

- BeOS, an operating system
- Brain Electrical Oscillation Signature Profiling
- Beos Station, rail station in Indonesia

== See also ==
- BEO (disambiguation)
