= Climate Case Ireland =

Friends of the Irish Environment v Government of Ireland (also known as Climate Case Ireland) is a landmark climate change case decided by the Irish Supreme Court in 2020. In the case, the Supreme Court quashed the Government of Ireland's 2017 National Mitigation Plan on the grounds that it lacked the specificity required by the Irish Climate Action and Low Carbon Development Act 2015 (the 2015 Climate Act). The Supreme Court ordered the government to create a new plan which was compliant with the 2015 Climate Act.

The case was initiated by environmental activist group Friends of the Irish Environment (FIE) in response to Ireland's substantial gap to its 2020 emissions target and insufficient progress towards "a low carbon, climate resilient and environmentally sustainable economy by the end of the year 2050". The Supreme Court dismissed FIE's rights-based arguments, stating that FIE as a corporate entity did not enjoy personal rights. The decision, marking the first time Irish courts held the government accountable for climate inaction, was acclaimed as a turning point and was internationally noted. The UN Special Rapporteur on human rights and the environment, David R. Boyd, called the case "a landmark decision" which "sets a precedent for courts around the world to follow".

== Background ==
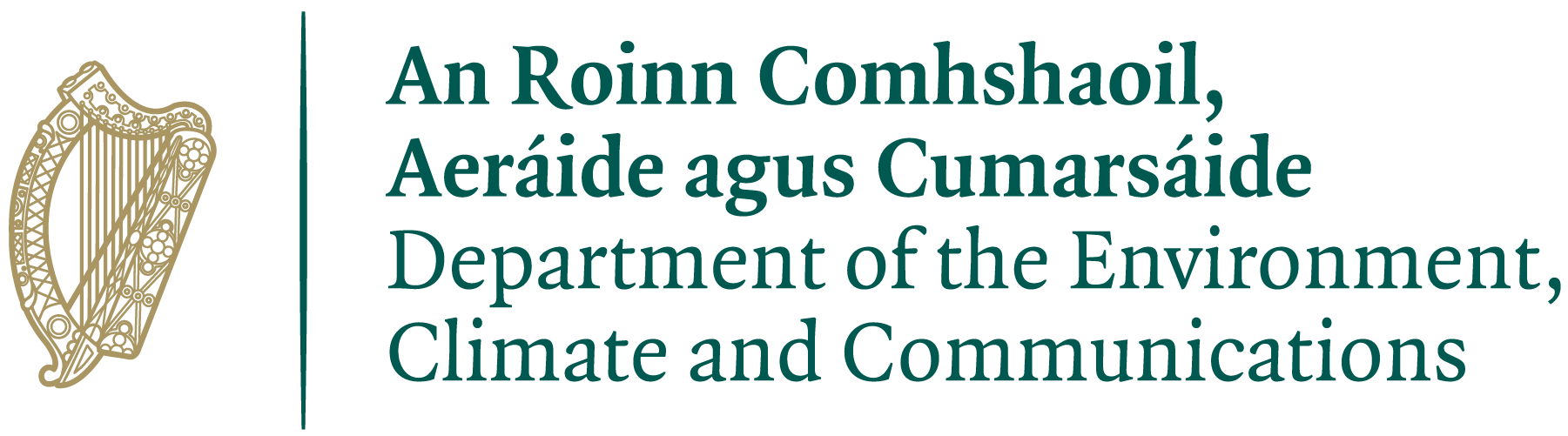
Irish Department of Climate, Energy and the Environment

The case concerned the National Mitigation Plan (the Plan), which was published on 19 July 2017. The 2015 Climate Act provides a framework for the establishment of "a low carbon, climate resilient and environmentally sustainable economy by the end of the year 2050" (the national transition objective). The 2015 Climate Act requires that, to enable the State to pursue the national transition objective, the government produce and approve a national mitigation plan which specifies "the manner in which it proposed to achieve the national transition objective".

In 2015, Ireland had the third highest greenhouse gas emissions per capita in the EU. In 2017, the Climate Change Advisory Council, an independent statutory body in Ireland, submitted its report to the government. It projected that Ireland would miss its targets for 2020 "by a substantial margin". It reported that additional policies and measures were "essential" for Ireland to meet its targets for 2030 and that the implementation of "effective additional policies" was "urgently" needed for Ireland's 2050 target. The chair of the Council, Professor John Fitzgerald, commented that the Plan contained "few decisions" and would not be enough to meet Ireland's national transition objective.

The case was brought by environmental activist group Friends of the Irish Environment (FIE), a non-profit company limited by guarantee and a registered charity in Ireland. FIE was inspired to bring the action by other global climate cases, including Netherlands v Urgenda and Juliana v. United States. FIE said that they hoped that the litigation would bring about more ambitious government action on climate change. There was considerable public support for FIE's decision to take the case, as a petition of support for the plaintiffs has gained over 20,000 signatures.

== High Court ==
In the High Court, FIE argued that the Plan was ultra vires the 2015 Climate Act and that the Plan violated rights under the ECHR and the Constitution of Ireland. It argued that the government, in approving the Plan, had failed to act to ensure that emissions were reduced in the short-term and medium term, and therefore would fail to achieve targets deemed necessary by the international community. It relied on the fact that, despite the advice of the Intergovernmental Panel on Climate Change that emissions would need to fall by at least 25–40% between 1990 and 2020 to help limit global warming to 2 °C above pre-industrial levels, the Plan envisaged an increase in emissions of 10% in that period. FIE noted that an even greater reduction would be necessary to meet the aim of the Paris Agreement to limit global warming to 1.5 °C above pre-industrial levels. FIE sought to have the government's decision to approve the Plan quashed and sought an order that the Plan be revised in accordance with the requirements of the 2015 Climate Act.

The government argued that the Plan, as government policy, was not justiciable. They further argued that, because FIE is a company and not a natural person, FIE had no standing to claim personal rights under the ECHR or the Constitution.

Mr. Justice MacGrath delivered the decision for the High Court on the 19 September 2019. The High Court found that FIE did have standing to bring rights based arguments and accepted, for the purposes of the case, that there was an unenumerated constitutional right to "an environment consistent with human dignity". However, it found that the Plan did not infringe this right or the constitutional rights to life or bodily integrity, as claimed by FIE. The High Court found that the Plan was not ultra vires the 2015 Climate Act, noting the "considerable margin of discretion" enjoyed by the government. The reliefs sought were refused.

== Supreme Court ==
After their case was unsuccessful in the High Court, the Supreme Court agreed to hear the case directly, allowing FIE to "leap-frog" the normal route to the Supreme Court via the Court of Appeal. In its decision, the Supreme Court noted that the case was of "general public and legal importance" and that there was no dispute between the parties as to the seriousness of climate change, the climate science underpinning the Plan or the likely increase in emissions during the Plan's lifetime.

The Supreme Court composition was seven judges: Clarke CJ, Irvine P, O'Donnell J, MacMenamin J, Dunne J, O'Malley J and Baker J. Such a composition is reserved for cases of particular importance or complexity. The case was heard over two days. The judgement, which had unanimous support from all seven judges, was delivered by Chief Justice Clarke on the 31 July 2020.

The Supreme Court ruled that the Plan was subject to judicial review, as the Court was not reviewing the adequacy of government policy but instead the government's obligation to produce a plan in accordance with the 2015 Climate Act.

The Supreme Court had quashed the Plan, finding it to be ultra vires the government because it did not conform with the requirement of the 2015 Climate Act as it did not provide specific details as to how the national transition objective would be achieved. The Court found that the Plan fell "well short" of the level of detail required under the 2015 Climate Act. Clarke CJ called parts of the Plan "excessively vague or aspirational". He explained that the Plan should have sufficient information to enable an interested member of the public to understand and assess how the government intends to meet its climate objectives.

Because the Court quashed the Plan, the government was obligated, under the 2015 Act, to make a new plan which complied with the Act, and covered the full period remaining to 2050. The Court also noted that, in line with its judgement, "it follows that an identical plan cannot be made in the future".

While FIE were successful in their argument regarding the illegality of the Plan, they were unsuccessful in their rights based arguments. The Court found that FIE, as a corporate entity, did not enjoy the right to life or bodily integrity and therefore did not have standing in terms of the various rights based claims it sought to put forward under the ECHR and the Constitution. However, Clarke CJ accepted that constitutional rights could be engaged in an appropriate environmental case in the future, although he expressed the view that a right to a healthy environment could not be derived from the Constitution.

== Reaction ==
The decision was hailed in Irish media as a "turning point for climate governance in Ireland" and a "watershed moment". It also garnered international media attention.

The Minister for the Environment, Climate and Communications, Eamon Ryan, said he "welcomed" the judgment of the Supreme Court and congratulated Friends of the Environment for taking the case. He said that the ruling must be used to "raise ambition" and "empower action".

== Impact ==
Climate Case Ireland was the first case in which the Irish courts held the government to account for their inaction on climate change. The case is one of three similarly high-profile, "strategic" climate cases internationally in which the highest national court has found that the government's climate mitigation policies do not comply with the law. It was the third climate case globally to reach the highest national court. The judgement came after a similar decision was upheld by the Dutch Supreme Court in the Urgenda case in 2019. Tessa Khan, an environmental lawyer who worked on that case, commented that the Irish decision eased some concerns that the Dutch decision would be a one-off. The UN Special Rapporteur on human rights and the environment, David R. Boyd, called the case "a landmark decision" which "sets a precedent for courts around the world to follow".
