= Extra Ordinary (film) =

2019 Irish horror comedy movie

- Theatrical release poster
- Directed by: Mike Ahern; Enda Loughman
- Written by: Mike Ahern; Enda Loughman
- Produced by: Ailish Bracken; Yvonne Donohoe; Katie Holly; Mary McCarthy
- Starring: Maeve Higgins; Barry Ward; Will Forte; Claudia O'Doherty; Jamie Beamish; Terri Chandler; Risteárd Cooper; Emma Coleman
- Cinematography: James Mather
- Edited by: Gavin Buckley
- Music by: George Brennan
- Production company: Blinder Films
- Distributed by: Wildcard Distribution Cranked Up Films
- Release dates: 10 March 2019 (South by Southwest premiere); 13 September 2019 (Ireland & UK); 6 March 2020 (US)
- Running time: 94 minutes
- Countries: Ireland; Belgium
- Language: English
- Box office: $223,898

Extra Ordinary is a 2019 horror comedy film written and directed by Mike Ahern and Enda Loughman. The film stars Maeve Higgins, Barry Ward, Will Forte, Claudia O'Doherty, Jamie Beamish, Terri Chandler, Risteárd Cooper and Emma Coleman. The film was released in Ireland and the United Kingdom on 13 September 2019 by Wildcard Distribution. The film was released in the United States on 6 March 2020 by Cranked Up Films. The film was well-received by critics, having almost universal approval.

== Plot ==
In childhood, Rose Dooley used her powerful 'talents' to help her father, celebrity paranormal expert Vincent Dooley, send wayward spirits into the afterlife. After an attempt results in her father's death, Rose eschews her talents, ignoring the minor hauntings and requests for help which she continues to receive in adulthood.

Rose works as a driving instructor and at the end of a pleasant lesson for Martin Martin, he asks for her help with the spirit of his nagging wife Bonnie, who has become physically abusive. Rose is sympathetic but declines to help. Meanwhile, one-hit wonder rock musician Christian Winter intends to sacrifice a virgin woman in a satanic ritual to regain his popularity, but his disinterested wife Claudia interrupts the ritual, killing his victim and forcing Christian to find another before the coming blood moon.

Intrigued by Martin, Rose stalks him to a store where his daughter Sarah works, and overhears him speaking fondly of her. Christian's virgin-finding tool leads him to the same store; that night he uses a spell that renders Sarah floating in a deep sleep. Called by Martin, Rose recognizes the spell and warns not to wake Sarah who could explode. Rose uses a holding spell so Sarah is not drawn to the site of the sacrificial ritual. Witnessing Martin interact with Bonnie's spirit, Rose realizes that he can communicate with ghosts and that together they can perform exorcisms and collect ectoplasm needed to break the spell on Sarah.

Rose and Martin respond to a request for help and exorcise a spirit from a dustbin by using Martin as a host for the spirit; when Rose successfully commands the spirit to move on from their world, Martin expels ectoplasm from his mouth into a provided jar. Christian witnesses this and is infuriated by their interference. He hires Rose for a driving lesson in order to collect material for another spell, though his driving phobia becomes further reinforced. Rose watches one of her father's videotapes and recalls the incident that led to his death. She informs Martin of this and of her fear that he might also be killed, but Martin is determined to save Sarah and convinces Rose to continue.

Rose and Martin collect the ectoplasm of several additional ghosts. With little time before the blood moon, they are forced to confront Bonnie's ghost, with the support of Rose's heavily pregnant sister Sailor and her date Brian. Bonnie possesses Martin and is commanded by Rose to leave, but Christian performs a spell that weakens Rose and breaks the holding spell on Sarah. Despite expelling ectoplasm, Bonnie's furious ghost remains sharing Martin's body. Sarah's body floats away; driving in search of her, they decide to follow a magpie that has been watching over Rose. The magpie leads them to Sarah's body, which Christian and Claudia are escorting in another car. Realizing that Christian is behind the ritual, Martin tries to stop their car but loses a finger in the process.

At Christian's castle, Christian kills Claudia for continuing to interrupt his incantations, then prepares to sacrifice Sarah. Rose, Martin, Sailor, and Brian arrive as Sarah is sucked into a huge pit that opens in Christian's floor; Christian also fatally wounds the magpie. However, the pit expels Sarah, alive and conscious; the demon Astaroth rises from the pit and berates Christian for not bringing him a virgin, as everyone believed Sarah to be. Astaroth decides to take Rose, an actual virgin, in Sarah's stead; as she is slowly dragged toward the pit, she convinces Martin to have sex with her. As they do, Sailor goes into labour, Brian helps her deliver her baby, and Sarah knocks Christian into the pit, which closes (taking Astaroth) as Rose and Martin climax. Bonnie tells Rose to treat Martin and Sarah well, then leaves Martin's body. Martin then allows himself to be a vessel for the dying magpie, which is revealed to be possessed by Vincent. He forgives Rose for the accident and welcomes Sailor's child – whom she names Vincent – before moving on.

Three months later, Rose and Martin have started a paranormal investigations and services business. Martin proposes to Rose, who, shocked, responds with a cheerful "No!"

== Cast ==
- Maeve Higgins as Rose Dooley
- Barry Ward as Martin Martin
- Will Forte as Christian Winter
- Claudia O'Doherty as Claudia Winter
- Jamie Beamish as Brian Welsh
- Terri Chandler as Sailor Dooley
- Risteárd Cooper as Vincent Dooley
- Emma Coleman as Sarah Martin
- Carrie Crowley as Marion Mularkey
- Mary McEvoy as Janet
- Agath Ellis as Young Rose
- Valerie O'Connor as Angela
- Siobhán McSweeney as Boring Noreen
- Eamon Morrissey as Mr. Daly
- Alison Spittle as Alison
- Jed Murray as Astaroth the Demon

== Release ==
The film premiered at South by Southwest on 10 March 2019. The film was released in Ireland and the United Kingdom on 13 September 2019 by Wildcard Distribution. The film was released in the United States on 6 March 2020 by Cranked Up Films.

== Reception ==
On Rotten Tomatoes, the film has an approval rating of 98% based on 94 reviews, with an average rating of 7.5/10. The site's consensus reads, "A horror/rom-com hybrid that somehow manages to blend its ingredients without losing their flavor, Extra Ordinary more than lives up to its title." On Metacritic the film has a weighted average score of 72 out of 100 based on reviews from 13 critics, indicating "generally favorable reviews".

Dennis Harvey of Variety wrote: "Extra Ordinary is a kind of tea-cosy Ghostbusters that's consistently funny in a pleasingly off-kilter way."

Donald Clarke of The Irish Times gave the film 3 out of 5 and praised Higgins for her performance but suggested that the film may be overstuffed. Chris Wasser of The Irish Independent gave the film 3 out of 5 and said it was "just as bonkers on screen as it is on paper" but it "eventually stretches itself beyond breaking point, bearing all the hallmarks of a surreal comedy sketch that got out of hand." Gareth O'Connor of Movies.ie gave the film a score of 3.5 out of 5. Stacy Grouden of Entertainment.ie gave the film a score of 4 out of 5.

== Promotional video game ==
Airdorf Games, who had previously created a promotional video game for the 2019 horror film The Wind, created a browser game based on Extra Ordinary. The game is a collection of minigames that loosely follows the plot of the film, and, while short, was met with positive reception.
