= Mícheál Ó hUanacháin =

Irish journalist and broadcaster

- Born: 1944 (age 81–82); Dublin, Ireland
- Education: University College Dublin
- Occupations: Poet and journalist
- Years active: 1960s–present
- Organization: Aontas na Scríbhneoirí Gaeilge
- Relatives: Patrick Honohan (brother); Edmund Honohan (brother)

Mícheál Ó hUanacháin is an Irish poet and journalist from Dublin, Ireland. He worked as a reporter and broadcaster for RTÉ until his retirement in 2009.

== Journalism ==
Ó hUanacháin was first appointed as continuity announcer for RTÉ Radio in 1968. During his career, he worked as a reporter, presenter and editor on television, radio and online media, with an interest in Irish language and culture, the Middle East and Islamic affairs. He retired in July 2009.

He reports on soccer matches as a freelance journalist, mainly on matches played by Bray Wanderers F.C. and Kerry F.C.. His reports on Kerry F.C. are published biweekly in the West Kerry Live local newspaper.

== Writing career ==
Ó hUanacháin's first collection of poetry was published in the early 1970s. Since then, he has released numerous collections in Irish including Go dTaga Léas (1971), Crann Tógála (1980), Aibítir Mheiriceá (1981), Tráchtaireacht ar na Cluichí Móra (1998), dánta.com (2006), Damhsa Rúnda (2008), Timthriall Nua (2017) and Faoi Choinneáil (2021).

He has also written two books in Irish for younger readers: Olé Olé Olé (1994) (Note: Olé, Olé, Olé is a common chant in association football, the theme of this book.) and An Tíogar agus a Mhadra (2015), illustrated by Sinéad Ní Uallacháin, with whom he worked previously in RTÉ.

Ó hUanacháin is active in organisations promoting Irish-language poetry and writers, including Aontas na Scríbhneoirí Gaeilge ("Irish language writers' association") of which he is the treasurer. He is also a member of the committee of An Fhéile Bheag Filíochta, an annual poetry festival in Ballyferriter, County Kerry.
