= Andrew Stanley =

Irish comedian and TV personality (born 1980)

Andrew Stanley (born 1980) is an Irish comedian and television personality best known for his appearances as host of hit RTÉ 2 TV show I Dare Ya. He has also featured in Just for Laughs, RTÉ's The Cafe, Podge and Rodge, Liffey Laughs and Tubridy Tonight.

The Scotsman newspaper described him as "a comic so clearly destined for the top, but with astonishingly good observational material delivered and timed to perfection there's no doubt about the destination of the young Irishman's career."

== Early life ==
Stanley was born in 1980 in Swords, County Dublin and attended St. Finians Community College. He worked as a computer programmer before trying out stand-up for the first time in 2000 after attending the Edinburgh Fringe Festival. He said of the time "I was under the illusion that every comic had a new set for every show every night. Naïve wasn't even the word!".

== Career ==
=== Stand-up comedy ===
Working his way around the Irish standup circuit, Stanley began playing in rooms such as the Comedy Cellar, which he would later go on to run, and the Laughter Lounge as well as clubs around the country and in the UK. He featured in a number of TV programmes in Ireland and the UK at the time including Young, Gifted & Broke and Take The Mic both on ITV.

=== Festivals ===
Stanley has appeared at numerous festivals worldwide as both a solo stand up and as part of comedy groups. He has made ten appearances at The Cat Laughs in Kilkenny, including two sold out solo shows in 2010 and 2011. He made five appearances at the Edinburgh Fringe Festival with hour long shows. These included a show with Australian comic, Damian Clark, called I Dare Ya, which went on to become a hit TV show on Irish station RTÉ 2, two solo shows and a late night entertainment show called Mish Mash which he co-hosted with Irish comics Fred Cooke and Neil Hickey. Mish Mash went on to be performed at both the Cat Laughs and the Vodafone Comedy Festival to sell out crowds.

Internationally, Stanley has performed in Australia at the Melbourne International Comedy Festival (2008–2010), the Adelaide Fringe Festival (2007–2008) and Sydneys Cracker Comedy Festival (2009–2010). He also took part in the Melbourne International Comedy Festival Roadshow in 2009 and the New Zealand Comedy Festival in Auckland in 2010. He was also invited to the prestigious Just for Laughs comedy festival in Montreal, where he performed alongside Ardal O'Hanlon, Colm O'Regan and Neil Delamere as part of the O'Comics show.
