= Mothers of Invention (podcast) =

Climate justice podcast

- Genre: Climate Justice

Creative team
- Created by: Doc Society

Cast and voices
- Starring: Mary Robinson; Maeve Higgins; Thimali Kodikara

Publication
- No. of seasons: 3
- No. of episodes: 20

Mothers of Invention is a podcast hosted by former President of Ireland Mary Robinson, comedian Maeve Higgins and series producer Thimali Kodikara. It is produced by Doc Society. The podcast debuted on 23 July 2018 and has so far run for three seasons. The podcast focuses on the intersection between climate change and feminism, exploring the idea that climate change is a man-made problem with a feminist solution.

== Episode details ==
Each episode of the podcast features a guest who has been fighting for climate justice. The first guest was Tessa Khan, a Bangladeshi-Australian lawyer who specialises in climate change litigation. Subsequent guests include marine biologist and environmental policy expert Ayana Elizabeth Johnson; Sara Tekola, a Black Lives Matter activist undertaking a PhD in climate science, environmental activist and geographer Hindou Oumarou Ibrahim and US Senator Bernie Sanders.

== Other initiatives ==
In 2020 the Mothers of Invention production team launched the Climate Reframe Project, an initiative to highlight the work of Black, Brown, Asian, People of Colour and UK based Indigenous Peoples who are climate experts, campaigners and advocates living and working in the UK. The project received funding from the Joseph Rowntree Foundation and the Solberga Foundation.
