= Meet Your Neighbours =

- Genre: Comedy
- Created by: P. J. Gallagher
- Written by: P. J. Gallagher
- Starring: P. J. Gallagher; Simone Kirby; Gearoid Farrelly; James J. Akpotor
- Country of origin: Ireland
- Original language: English
- No. of series: 1
- No. of episodes: 6

Production
- Running time: 30 minutes
- Production company: Scratch Productions

Original release
- Network: RTÉ One
- Release: 17 November – 22 December 2011

Meet Your Neighbours is an Irish character-based comedy sketch show which was first broadcast on RTÉ Television in 2011. It was written by and starred the comedian P. J. Gallagher.

== Premise ==
Set in a close-knit Dublin suburb, the show comprises sketches involving exaggerated parodies of Irish people from all walks of life in various situations familiar to the Irish. The comedy is derived from the audience's self-deprecating understanding of either themselves or people known to them. These sketches are presented to the viewer in a mockumentary-style format with the characters often speaking directly to camera with other more visual comedy elements such as slapstick and physical comedy.

== Main characters ==
Amongst the main characters are: Ger and Pat, a conjoined pair of twins, one of whom is gay while the other is an alcoholic heterosexual bigot; The Dub, a gobby Dublin GAA fan full of his own self-important opinions; Séamus and Mary, a mixed race husband and wife who have a problem with foreigners; Mr. and Mrs. Roger Balfe, an upwardly mobile couple obsessed with plastic surgery; and Mrs. O'Donoghue, a granny obsessed with cake.

== Cast ==
P. J. Gallagher plays all of the main characters in the show. It also stars Simone Kirby as Auntie Maureen and Mrs. Roger Balfe, Gearóid Farrelly as Pat (the conjoined twin), Eoin Whelan as Pascal, and James J. Akpotor (AKA Tiny James) plays Séamus.

== Production ==
Originally titled Meet the Gallaghers, a pilot episode was filmed in December 2010. A full series of six episodes was subsequently commissioned with filming taking place in Dublin throughout 2011.
