= Cat Laughs =

Annual comedy festival in Ireland

- Status: Active
- Genre: Comedy Festival
- Frequency: Annually
- Locations: Kilkenny, County Kilkenny,
- Country: Ireland
- Inaugurated: 1994
- Founder: Lynn Cahill; Richard Cook
- Website: thecatlaughs.com

The Cat Laughs Comedy Festival is a comedy festival held over the first weekend in June each year in Kilkenny, County Kilkenny, Ireland. It was founded in 1994. It has been referred to as the "Best Little Comedy Festival in the world" by The Guardian and RTÉ.

== History ==
Cat Laughs was envisioned in 1994 by Lynn Cahill, who ran Bickerstaffe Theatre Company in Kilkenny. As a means to expand the company's programme, she considered with her business partner that Kilkenny was great for a festival. After originally planning a choral festival called "Cat Sings", her business partner Richard Cook suggested a comedy festival instead. For the first two editions, no Irish comedian closed the festival due to the audience preferring British comics. The first edition was sponsored by Smithwick's before being sponsored by Murphy's Irish Stout until 2015 when Smithwick's returned. The festival experienced a major financial loss in its inaugural year, with debts ranging between £70,000 and £100,000. The festival's second edition was held with the hopes that the debts from the first edition could be paid off. By 2002, the festival had become a profitable venture; 2002 the first year that the festival received support from the Arts Council, which provided a grant of €95,000.

The festival is traditionally held over the June Holiday long weekend. Each comedian is previewed at other shows by the festival directors before being invited to perform at Cat Laughs.

Many comedians from the UK and Ireland have attended including; Dara Ó Briain, Ed Byrne and Eddie Izzard. Some notable names in stand-up, like David O'Doherty, have gone from audience member to headliner over the festival's history. The festival has also been used as a way to launch the careers of comedians from outside the United Kingdom and Ireland. Other notable Irish comedians who have worked Cat Laughs include Tommy Tiernan, Dylan Moran, Joanne McNally, Jason Byrne, Neil Delamere, Alison Spittle, Karl Spain, and Eleanor Tiernan.

A tradition developed over the years that as a part of the festival, the Irish comedians would play a football match against comedians from the rest of the world for the Cat Cup.
