= Dave Coffey =

Irish writer, director and actor

Dave Coffey is an Irish writer, director and actor. He is a native of Killiney, County Dublin. He wrote and directed both series of Dan & Becs for RTÉ (in which he co-starred) and has also appeared in RTÉ's Bittersweet and the music video for the single "Grace, Don't Wait!" by Irish band The Coronas.

In December 2007 Coffey began writing a weekly column as "Dan " for the Irish Independent’s Day & Night Magazine. Dan & Becs was nominated for an Irish Film and Television Awards award in the category of Best Entertainment Programme.

In 2008 Coffey co-wrote and directed a young peoples’ programme called Sweded TV for RTÉ Two. Sweded TV was selected for screening at the 2009 International Public Television Screening Conference in Warsaw, Poland.

In 2009, he co-wrote and directed a new ten-part comedy series called Sarah & Steve broadcast on RTÉ Two.

During the summer of 2009, Coffey co-wrote and directed a second season of Sweded TV which was also broadcast on RTÉ Two. Season 2 of Sweded TV was short-listed for the New York International Children's Film Festival.

In 2010, Dan & Becs was optioned by Sony Pictures Entertainment and developed into a half-hour pilot script for Fox Television.

During the summer of 2010, Coffey co-wrote and directed a new young peoples' programme called Stereoswipes which was broadcast as part of The Rumour Room on RTÉ Two in the autumn of that year.

Also in 2010, Coffey helped develop and co-direct a pilot for a new twelve-part reality show called Fade Street which was picked up by RTÉ. The show's format is loosely based on the style of American reality TV shows such as The Hills and The City. Coffey worked as Story Producer on the show.

More directing credits followed, including two series of Celebrity Salon for TV3, and The Perfect Irish Man, a documentary for RTÉ Two.

In 2012, Coffey wrote a sitcom pilot called Bad Angel for NBC Television. He also collaborated with Entourage producer Doug Ellin on the creation of a comedy pilot about Professional Wrestling for cable network, HBO.

On October 28, 2013, RTÉ Two broadcast a half-hour comedy pilot called The Commute, which was written, produced and directed by Coffey. The Commute, which was shot entirely on GoPro cameras, is about three couples living on the edge of Dublin's commuter belt. All the action takes place in the cars of the three featured couples as they travel to and from work every day.

In 2018, Coffey launched a comedy podcast called Phoning It In on the HeadStuff Podcast Network. The show is an improvised phone-in show. Coffey acts as host while the callers are played by comedians, actors and improvisers who don't know what they will be discussing until they are introduced on air. Guests have included comedians Tara Flynn, Kevin McGahern and Alison Spittle.

In 2020, Coffey produced and hosted a spin-off to Phoning It In called Talking It Out for RTÉ. The show is an improvised topical panel show. The regular guests are caricatures of typical panel show guests played by comedy performers Kevin McGahern, Pearl O'Rourke, Peter McGann and Sophie Shanley. The show was released weekly as both a cartoon on the RTÉ Player and as a podcast with bonus content. To keep the show topical, Coffey and his team produced the cartoon version within 36 hours of recording using the live motion-capture animation software Adobe Character Animator.
