= Tubridy Tonight =

Talk show on Irish TV

- Logo used by Tubridy Tonight towards the end of its run
- Genre: Light entertainment
- Created by: Kathy Fox
- Directed by: Niamh White
- Presented by: Ryan Tubridy
- Starring: Clint Velour and the Camembert Quartet
- Country of origin: Ireland
- Original language: English
- No. of series: 5
- No. of episodes: 156

Production
- Executive producer: John O'Regan
- Producer: James Cotter
- Production locations: Studio 4, RTÉ Television Centre, Donnybrook, Dublin 4, Ireland
- Running time: 65–80 mins

Original release
- Network: RTÉ One
- Release: 16 October 2004 – 30 May 2009

Related
- Saturday Live (1999); The Saturday Night Show (2010–2015); The Late Late Show (1962–present)

Tubridy Tonight is a talk show hosted by Ryan Tubridy that aired on RTÉ One for five seasons between 2004 and 2009. The programme featured guest interviews (usually three per show), audience participation and live music from both a guest music group and the house band. Tubridy Tonight aired every Saturday night, except during the summer months, directly after the main evening news. The show's house musical act was Clint Velour and the Camembert Quartet.

Tubridy Tonight was the first successful Saturday night chat show to be broadcast by RTÉ since the ending of Kenny Live in 1999. The programme had regular viewing figures of 450,000, however, the show also regularly fell victim to so-called "Saturday Night Syndrome", with The Late Late Show, broadcast on Friday nights, frequently featuring supposedly better guests. In 2009 Tubridy Tonight came to an end when RTÉ announced that Tubridy would succeed Pat Kenny as host of The Late Late Show for the following series, with the presenter describing Tubridy Tonight as "quite the odyssey".

== Background ==
Upon Gay Byrne's retirement from The Late Late Show in 1999, RTÉ announced that Pat Kenny, host of his own Saturday night chat show, would be Byrne's replacement. Kenny Live had aired since 1988 and had been a staple of the RTÉ schedule since the first series. The departure of Pat Kenny to the Friday night slot left a gap in the schedule. Saturday Live, a programme that had originally aired in the late 1980s and featured a different host every week, was revived as a replacement. The second coming of the show proved unpopular and was ended after only one series. Following the axing of Saturday Live RTÉ declined to produce a Saturday night chat show, instead favouring to show a film after the main evening news, labelled "The Big Big Movie". On 9 May 2004, RTÉ announced that Ryan Tubridy would host a new Saturday night chat show that coming autumn.

Tubridy Tonight made its debut on 16 October 2004 for an initial run of ten programmes. It featured Gráinne and Síle Seoige, Hector Ó hEochagáin and Royston Brady as the first interviewees. The programme received relatively good reviews, with Shane Hegarty of The Irish Times describing the show as having gotten off "to a ropey start but improved as it went along". Hegarty bemoaned the fact that the show was broadcast live as "it added nothing to the show apart from a weak caption competition for viewers and a distinct nervousness to the host." An element of the programme which included audience participation was described as a "meek replication of Graham Norton's old routine." The new chat show proved popular with audiences and, after the initial run of ten shows ended, another thirteen shows were commissioned thereby extending the first series.

Tubridy Tonight was broadcast from Studio 4 in the RTÉ Television Centre at Donnybrook, Dublin 4. That studio was also home to the show's Friday night rival The Late Late Show. As RTÉ's biggest, the studio holds 200 audience members.

== Format ==
Logo used by Tubridy Tonight between 2004 and 2008

Tubridy Tonight was in RTÉ One's Saturday night slot from 2004 to 2009, having succeeded Kenny Live upon its demise in 1999.^{a} The show had an American-style feel about it with a house band, the Camembert Quartet, providing the theme music and introductory pieces befitting the guests. Similar to American chat shows, Tubridy Tonight had no opening titles and borrowed its informal bantering style from US entertainers such as David Letterman and Conan O'Brien. The studio was revamped for series five in 2008, with the addition of a staircase used by guests and a platform for the house band, although the library theme remained intact. The show followed a simple format. There were usually three interviewees as well as a musical guest. Tubridy may also have conducted a quiz or a game at his leisure with a member of the studio audience, an example being a game of charades based on the Academy Awards, and there also may have been a competition which, upon the show's imminent end, consisted of a live call to a viewer who may or may not win a prize.

== Incidents ==
Tubridy Tonight conducted the last live television interview with model and socialite, Katy French only two weeks before her death in suspicious circumstances. The interview took place on 24 November 2007 during the fourth season of the chat show. In 2008, it featured a live fight between chefs Kevin Dundon and Dylan McGrath over their styles of cooking; the duo were on the show to promote Guerrilla Gourmet. On 1 March 2008, Tubridy Tonight saw the first Irish television interview with Glen Hansard and Markéta Irglová following their Academy Award-winning show the previous month. Hansard's mother brought the award to display to the nation. In February 2009, the show was subject to a hate campaign on social networking site Facebook.

== Broadcast dates ==
| Seasons | Dates |
|---|---|
| 1 | 16 October 2004 – April 2005 |
| 2 | 2005–2006 |
| 3 | 23 September 2006 – 19 May 2007 |
| 4 | 22 September 2007 – 17 May 2008 |
| 5 | 27 September 2008 – 30 May 2009 |

== List of episodes ==
=== Seasons one and two ===
"Are those real books?"

— ^{Ross Noble inspecting the famous Tubridy books in an early episode of the chat show}

Interviews

Guests on the first two series' of the show included: Bob Geldof, Charles Dance, Bertie Ahern and Fine Gael leader Enda Kenny. Actress Brenda Fricker appeared with her Oscar and was shown playing drums with the house band. Former tennis player Pat Cash was shown playing guitar. Channel 4 newsreader Jon Snow sang The Beatles song "Hey Jude" and encouraged the audience to join in. Hollywood actor Richard E. Grant revealed his reason for appearing in Spiceworld: The Movie.

Also appearing were: comedian Ardal O'Hanlon, Irish international rugby captain Brian O'Driscoll, snooker players Dennis Taylor and Steve Davis, former Emmerdale and Bad Girls actress Claire King, Coronation Street actress Sally Lindsay, actor Jimmy Nesbitt, supermodel Twiggy, Naked Camera actor Maeve Higgins (who revealed why she wanted to marry Eddie Hobbs), West Wing actor Martin Sheen, actress Julie Walters, comedian Ross Noble (Who climbed the prop bookcases and inspected the books to see if they were real, before ripping out a picture of Mike Yarwood on one page and wearing it as a mask and television personality Hector Ó hEochagáin.

Musical guests included: Blondie, The Human League (singing "Don't You Want Me") and Natalie Imbruglia (singing "Shiver").

Guests included:

- Katy French
- Twiggy
- Michelle Heaton
- Jack P. Shepherd
- Bertie Ahern
- Brian O'Driscoll
- Pauline McLynn
- Jimmy Nesbitt
- Hector Ó hEochagáin
- Boyzone
- Brian Dowling
- Fran Cosgrave
- Bob Geldof
- Pete Burns
- Louis Walsh
- Geri Halliwell
- Alan Carr
- Sally Lindsay
- Colin Farrell
- Westlife
- Brendan Gleeson
- Marco Pierre White
- Natalie Cassidy
- David Gest
- Gavin Ó Fearraigh
- Rebecca Loos
- Germaine Greer
- Eddie Hobbs
- Uri Geller
- Alex Best
- Vanessa Feltz
- George Galloway

Performances

As is standard with televised talk shows, each week an artist was invited to perform a musical composition. Irish musical groups to appear included:

- Bell X1
- The Blizzards
- Dark Room Notes
- Director
- Fight Like Apes
- The Frames
- The Frank and Walters
- Ham Sandwich
- Neosupervital
- Republic of Loose
- Royseven
- The Saw Doctors

Irish soloists invited to perform their musical compositions included:

- Paddy Casey
- Cathy Davey
- Duke Special
- Julie Feeney
- Glen Hansard
- Christy Moore
- Fionn Regan

=== Season three ===
International guests in season three included: David Hasselhoff (who entertained the audience with an impromptu version of "Unchain My Heart"), Jack Osbourne, Ainsley Harriott, Paul Burrell, Martin Sheen, Julie Walters, Wendy Richard, Joshua Jackson, Fionnula Flanagan, Andy Summers, Pete Burns, Joanna Lumley and Belinda Carlisle.

| Date | Interviews | Game | Performance | Song | Details |
|---|---|---|---|---|---|
| 23 September 2006 | Sophie Anderton, Ruth Gilligan, Michael Madsen and Mark Mahon, John Connolly | | Katie Melua | "It's Only Pain" | Details |
| 30 September 2006 | David Hasselhoff, Ken Doherty, Gerry Stembridge, John Connolly | | Duke Special | "Last Night I Nearly Died (But I Woke Up Just in Time)" | Details |
| 7 October 2006 | Jack Osbourne, Johnny Logan, Hector, John Connolly | | Deacon Blue | "Real Gone Kid" | Details |
| 14 October 2006 | Twiggy, Bernard Dunne, Clive James, Carol Drinkwater | | Luan Parle | "Corporate Culture" | Details |
| 21 October 2006 | Ainsley Harriott, Paul Gleeson and Tori Holmes, Paul Burrell, Frederick Forsyth | | Ray LaMontagne | "Trouble" | Details |
| 28 October 2006 | Martin Sheen and Shay Cullen, Julie Walters, Keith Barry, Chris de Burgh | | Chris de Burgh | "A Spaceman Came Travelling" | Details |
| 4 November 2006 | Mario Rosenstock, John and Richard Bruton, Des Bishop | | Royseven | "Happy Ever Afters" | Details |
| 11 November 2006 | Brian Kerr, Colm Wilkinson, Amy Huberman and Leigh Arnold | | Lucie Silvas | "Last Year" | Details |
| 18 November 2006 | Diarmuid Gavin, Dave Fanning, Maeve Higgins | | 747s | "Rainkiss" | Details |
| 25 November 2006 | Dara Ó Briain, Gail Porter, Brendan Grace | | Amy Winehouse | "Rehab" | Details |
| 2 December 2006 | Christy Moore, Risteárd Cooper and Gary Cooke, Patrick Kielty | | The Blizzards | "Fantasy" | Details |
Christmas break
| 13 January 2007 | Wendy Richard, Dr. Mark Hamilton, Lorraine Pilkington | | Director | "Leave It to Me" | Details |
| 20 January 2007 | Joshua Jackson, Jodie Kidd and Adi Roche, Pat Rabbitte | | | | Details |
| 27 January 2007 | n/a | | | | |
| 3 February 2007 | n/a | | | | |
| 10 February 2007 | n/a | | | | |
| 17 February 2007 | Bill O'Herlihy, Fionnula Flanagan, Monica Loughman | | The Waterboys | "Everybody Takes a Tumble" | Details |
| 24 February 2007 | Johnny Briggs, Stephen Roche, Cathy Kelly | | Idlewild | "No Emotion" | Details |
| 3 March 2007 | Trudie Styler, Ted and Ruby Walsh, Derek Acorah | | The Hedrons | "Heatseeker" | Details |
| 10 March 2007 | Louis Walsh, Cleo Rocos, Dáithí Ó Sé, Aoife Ní Thuraisc and Sinéad Ní Loideáin, Coleen Nolan | | The Divine Comedy | "A Lady of a Certain Age" | Details |
| 17 March 2007 | Ray Houghton, Celia Holman-Lee, George Hook, Glen Hansard | | Glen Hansard | "Say It to Me Now" | Details |
| 24 March 2007 | Eddie O'Sullivan, Kathryn Thomas, Belinda Carlisle, Jeff Banks | | Belinda Carlisle | "Avec le Temps" | Details |
| 31 March 2007 | Carrie Crowley and Conor Mullen, Andy Summers, Jean Butler, Brian Harvey | | | | Details |
| 7 April 2007 | Pete Burns, Sonia O'Sullivan, Marian Keyes, Joe Duffy | | | | Details |
| 14 April 2007 | Joanna Lumley, John McGuire, Paolo Tullio | | Brian McFadden | "Like Only a Woman Can" | Details |
| 21 April 2007 | n/a | | | | |
| 28 April 2007 | n/a | | | | |
| 5 May 2007 | Paul Williams, Hector Ó hEochagáin, Mick O'Dwyer | | Maria Doyle Kennedy | "F'Ability" | Details |
| 12 May 2007 | n/a | | | | |
| 19 May 2007 | Gerard Byrne, Peter Corry and Gavin O'Fearraigh, Brian Blessed, Pauline McLynn | | Paula Flynn | "Let's Dance" | Details |

=== Season four ===
International guests in season four included: Christian Slater, Jennie Bond, David Gest, Sophie Dahl, Myleene Klass, Janice Dickinson, Barbara Windsor, Frank Vincent, Dominic Purcell, Kathleen Turner, Martin Freeman, Carol Vorderman, Patsy Palmer, Max Clifford, Geri Halliwell, Joe Elliott and Morgan Spurlock.

| Date | Interviews | Game | Performance | Song | Details |
|---|---|---|---|---|---|
| 22 September 2007 | Christian Slater, Sinéad Kelly, Neil Jordan | | Richard Hawley | "Tonight the Streets Are Ours" | Details |
| 29 September 2007 | Dara Ó Briain, Jennie Bond, Trevor Brennan | | The Saw Doctors | "I Useta Lover" | Details |
| 6 October 2007 | David Gest, Dan & Becs, Bibi Baskin | | Kate Nash | "Foundations" | Details |
| 13 October 2007 | Gemma Craven, Neil Delamere, Pattie Boyd, Marty Morrissey | | Fight Like Apes | "Jake Summers" | Details |
| 20 October 2007 | Nancy Dell'Olio, John Simpson, Maeve Higgins | | Cathy Davey | "Reuben" | Details |
| 27 October 2007 | Hector and Risteárd, Gino D'Acampo, Andrew Maxwell | | Newton Faulkner | "I Need Something" | Details |
| 3 November 2007 | Sophie Dahl, Esther Rantzen, Sean Kelly | | Sinéad O'Connor | "Dark I Am Yet Lovely" | Details |
| 10 November 2007 | Myleene Klass, Mario Rosenstock, Mary Kennedy, Frank McCourt | | Hard-Fi | "Can't Get Along (Without You)" | Details |
| 17 November 2007 | Jonathan Rhys Meyers, Damian Clark and Andrew Stanley, Peter Jones | | The Rumble Strips | "Girls and Boys in Love" | Details |
| 24 November 2007 | Richard Corrigan, Katy French and Michael Healy-Rae, Jon Ronson | | The Hoosiers | "Goodbye Mr A" | Details |
| 1 December 2007 | Brendan O'Connor, Cecelia Ahern, Ardal O'Hanlon | | Fionn Regan | "Be Good or Be Gone" | Details |
| 8 December 2007 | Bláthnaid Ní Chofaigh, Sorcha Furlong and Dave Duffy, David Kelly, Oliver Callan | | Shaggy | "Bonafide Girl" | Details |
| 15 December 2007 | Janice Dickinson, John Duddy, Phil Coulter, Paul Brady and Eleanor McEvoy, Packie Bonner, Andy Townsend and John Aldridge | | Shayne Ward | "Melt the Snow" | Details |
Christmas break
| 5 January 2008 | Barbara Windsor, Gerry Ryan, Sarah Delamare Hurding and Ivan Yates | | | | Details |
| 12 January 2008 | Duncan and Tania Stewart, Neil Strauss and Dáithí Ó Sé, Ray Mears | | Sons and Daughters | "Gilt Complex" | Details |
| 19 January 2008 | Patrick Kielty, Brian Dowling, Lucinda Creighton, Tioreasa Ferris and Lisa McDonald | | Tom Baxter | "Better" | Details |
| 26 January 2008 | Frank Vincent, Brendan O'Carroll, Dylan McGrath, Kevin Thornton and Kevin Dundon | | Adele | "Chasing Pavements" | Details |
| 2 February 2008 | Adele King and Chloë Agnew, Seán Óg Ó hAilpín, Derval O'Rourke and David Gillick, Kathryn Thomas | | | | Details |
| 9 February 2008 | Natalie Cassidy, Louis Walsh, Donal MacIntyre | | Los Campesinos! | "Death to Los Campesinos!" | Details |
| 16 February 2008 | Brendan Gleeson and Colin Farrell, Westlife, Bo Derek | | Westlife | "Us Against the World" | Details |
| 23 February 2008 | Dominic Purcell, Dustin, Ashley Jensen, The Carberrys | Audience game | Katie Melua | "If the Lights Go Out" | Details |
| 1 March 2008 | Glen Hansard and Markéta Irglová, Martina Stanley and Tony O'Callaghan, Lisa Murtagh, Niamh O'Kane and Gráinne Fox | Audience game | Glen Hansard and Marketa Irglova | "Falling Slowly" | Details |
| 8 March 2008 | Kathleen Turner, Martin Freeman, Jason Byrne | Stranger Than Fiction | | | Details |
| 15 March 2008 | Carol Vorderman, Arthur Matthews and Graham Linehan, Michelle Heaton | | We Are Scientists | "After Hours" | Details |
| 22 March 2008 | Deirdre O'Kane, Linda Lusardi, Liam Clancy | Wax Lyrical | Elbow | "Grounds for Divorce" | Details |
| 29 March 2008 | | | | | |
| 5 April 2008 | Bernard Dunne, Oliver Callan, Katie Hopkins, Paul Young | | | | Details |
| 12 April 2008 | Sarah Brightman, Alan Carr, Tommy Tiernan | | Dark Room Notes | "Love Like Nicotine" | Details |
| 19 April 2008 | Marco Pierre White, Lucy Kennedy, Stephen Hunt | | Ham Sandwich | "Keepsake" | Details |
| 26 April 2008 | Patsy Palmer, Marty Whelan, Ross Hamilton, PJ Gallagher | | The Script | "We Cry" | Details |
| 3 May 2008 | Boyzone, Max Clifford, Mairead Farrell | | | | Details |
| 10 May 2008 | Geri Halliwell, Jennifer Maguire, Joe Elliott, Morgan Spurlock | | The National | "Fake Empire" | Details |
| 17 May 2008 | Dana, Dickie Rock and Maxi, Niall Quinn, Sophie Merry, Rosanna Davison | | Scouting For Girls | "Heartbeat" | Details |

=== Season five ===
"It's like trying to run an assembly in a girls' school!"

— ^{Ryan Tubridy on the audience's excited reaction to his guests Take That, which he also described as never having occurred with any previous guest on the show.}

International guests in season five included: William Shatner, Henry Winkler, Roger Moore, Richard and David Attenborough (on separate occasions), Paul Gascoigne, Spandau Ballet and a then-unknown singer called Lady Gaga. Former president Mary Robinson also appeared, as did Gay Byrne. David Hasselhoff made a return appearance to mark the final episode, as Tubridy moved to Friday nights and The Late Late Show.

| Date | Interviews | Performance | Song | Details |
|---|---|---|---|---|
| 27 September 2008 | Aidan and Marian Quinn, Don Baker, Oliver Callan | Fujiya and Miyagi | "Knickerbocker" | Details |
| 4 October 2008 | Gráinne and Síle Seoige, Peaches Geldof, Craig Doyle, Anna Faris | Sharleen Spiteri | "Stop, I Don't Love You Anymore" | Details |
| 11 October 2008 | Johnny Logan, Jackie Collins, Paddy Courtney, Claudine Palmer | | | Details |
| 18 October 2008 | Francis and John Brennan, Michelle Heaton, Father Brian D'Arcy, Michael Fassbender | Fall Out Boy | "I Don't Care" | Details |
| 25 October 2008 | Mike Murphy, Mary Black, Neven Maguire | The Saturdays | "Up" | Details |
| 1 November 2008 | Loyd Grossman, Eoin Colfer, Seán Gallagher, Gavin Duffy and Sarah Newman | Sugababes | "Girls" | Details |
| 8 November 2008 | Henry Healy (Barack Obama's ninth cousin), Richard Attenborough, Mario Rosenstock as Roy Keane, Zig and Zag, Dougray Scott | Stereophonics | | Details |
| 15 November 2008 | (Gay Byrne),(Colm and Jim-Jim) | | | Details |
| 22 November 2008 | John Slattery, Pádraig Harrington, Eamonn Holmes and Ruth Langsford, Jason Byrne | Gabriella Cilmi | "Sweet About Me" | Details |
| 29 November 2008 | Dara Ó Briain, Anthony Foley and Peter Stringer, Aidan Gillen | | | Details |
| 6 December 2008 | Brendan Grace, Take That, Gok Wan | Take That | "Greatest Day" | Details |
| 13 December 2008 | Hector Ó hEochagáin, Mary Robinson feat. Dustin the Turkey, John Spillane feat. Hector | | | Details |
| 20 December 2008 | Brendan O'Carroll, Charlie Brooks, Amanda Byram, Neil Delamere | The Script, Finbar Furey | | Details |
| {Wed.} 31 December 2008 (New Year's Eve) | Leo Sayer, Kenny Egan and Katie Taylor, Dustin the Turkey, Liz O'Kane, Brendan O'Connor and George Hook | Leo Sayer | | Details |
| 10 January 2009 | Tom Chambers, Craig Revel Horwood and Bruno Tonioli (Strictly Come Dancing), Mark Hamilton, Amanda Brunker, Duncan Bannatyne (Dragons' Den) | | | Details |
| 17 January 2009 | Roger Moore, Michael English, Maura Derrane | | | Details |
| 24 January 2009 | Alice O'Sullivan and Aoife Kelly (1st and 49th Roses of Tralee), The Naked Cowboy | The Naked Cowboy | | Details |
| 31 January 2009 | William Shatner, La Toya Jackson, Cathy Kelly | Lady Gaga | "Just Dance" | Details |
| 7 February 2009 | Petula Clark, David Coleman (Teens in the Wild), Mark Pollock | Petula Clark | | Details |
14 February 2009 had no show due to Ryan Tubridy hosting the Irish Film and Television Awards on that date
| 21 February 2009 | Liam Neeson/James Nesbitt, George Hook/Brent Pope | Bell X1 | | Details |
| 28 February 2009 | Maura Tierney, Bernard Dunne/~~Kenny Egan/Katie Taylor~~ | The Blizzards | | Details |
| 7 March 2009 | Amy Huberman, Kevin Dundon, Dara Ó Cinnéide, Aoibhinn Ní Shúilleabháin, Paddy Courtney, George Karellas | | | Details |
| 14 March 2009 | Ruby Walsh, David Attenborough, Franc | Sandy Kelly | | Details |
| 21 March 2009 | Michael Sheen, George Lee, Mulkerrin Brothers and Daithí Ó Sé | Fred | "Good One" | Details |
| 28 March 2009 | Bernard Dunne, Holly Willoughby, Mrs. Brown | Brian Kennedy | | Details |
| 4 April 2009 | Pat Shortt, Paul Howard, Lorraine Keane | | | Details |
| 11 April 2009 | Brian Kerr, Angie Best, Paul Williams | | | Details |
| 18 April 2009 | Erin O'Connor and Fiona Ellis (The Model Agent), Chris de Burgh, Adam Brophy/Sinéad Moriarty/Dermot Whelan (panelists for discussion on parenthood) | | | Details |
| 25 April 2009 | Paul Gascoigne, Richard Corrigan, Dolores O'Riordan | | | Details |
| 2 May 2009 | Fern Britton, Stephen Fry, Jason Byrne, PJ Gallagher | Boyzone | | Details |
| 9 May 2009 | Derek Davis and Katherine Lynch (Celebrity Bainisteoir), Mario Rosenstock, Colm Meaney, Robson Green | | | Details |
16 May 2009 had no show due to Eurovision Song Contest 2009 coinciding with that date
| 23 May 2009 | Spandau Ballet, Henry Winkler, Adam Carroll, Mary Kennedy and Marty Whelan | Spandau Ballet | "Gold" | Details |
| 30 May 2009 | David Hasselhoff, Marian Keyes, Des Bishop, Dana Delany | | | Details |

== Christmas shows ==
In 2006, Tubridy began travelling beyond The Pale to host his annual special Christmas show.

| Date | Location |
| 23 December 2006 | Everyman Palace Theatre, Cork |
| 15 December 2007 | Regional Sports and Leisure Complex, Letterkenny |
| 2008 | Galway |

== Critique ==
A poll found that, within five months of Tubridy Tonight going on air, 38 per cent of adults preferred Tubridy on television, compared with 40 per cent opting for his main rival, Pat Kenny, with whom the show competed for guests. Tubridy Tonight and its host also won praise from the former host of The Late Late Show, Gay Byrne. This led to some ponderings as to why Tubridy was left with substandard "dull" guests that did not befit his talent. Some guests opted to be interviewed by Tubridy instead of by Kenny on The Late Late Show. Competition between the two shows was analogous to similar competition in a previous decade between Byrne and Kenny.

A 2008 survey by The Times concluded that almost 1/5 of guests on RTÉ chat shows including Tubridy Tonight were RTÉ employees and associates. The survey did not include musical acts.

Online on RTE Player in 2022 for 60 Years of television.

== Footnotes ==
- ^a The host, Pat Kenny moved from the Saturday night slot to take over the presentation of The Late Late Show on Friday nights on the same channel.

| Preceded by Films - having succeeded Saturday Live's second run | Saturday night programming on Telefís Éireann; 2004 - 2009 | Succeeded by The Saturday Night Show versus Tonight with Craig Doyle |
