= Dan & Becs =

2007 Irish comedy television series

- Dan & Becs
- Genre: Sitcom
- Created by: Dave Coffey
- Starring: Dave Coffey; Holly White
- Country of origin: Ireland
- Original language: English
- No. of episodes: 20

Production
- Running time: 20 minutes

Original release
- Network: RTÉ Two
- Release: 8 January – 9 October 2007

Dan & Becs is an Irish comedy television series aired on RTÉ Two. It portrayed the lives of an affluent South County Dublin couple. Dan was played by Dave Coffey and Becs was played by Holly White. In 2008 the show was nominated for an IFTA in the Best Television Entertainment Category.

The show ended in 2007 after two series. Both series were released in December 2007 on one DVD with added extras. Creator Dave Coffey, who also played Dan in the show, is working on a new show, Sarah & Steve which he described as a "sweet romantic comedy about a relationship between two working class people based in Tallaght".

== Premise ==
The comedy focused on the lives of Dan, an unemployed aspiring filmmaker and Becs, an aspiring actress and model. The two were a couple from Dalkey and discussed their lives six months into their relationship.

The show did not follow the typical format of a sitcom. Each episode was ten minutes long and the two characters were never in the same room with each other (with the exception of both season finales), instead intercutting the individual video diaries of the couple. Dan was usually found in his bedroom in the home of his adopted parents where he still lived. Most episodes followed Becs driving around after an audition for a modelling or acting job. The only times the two ever appeared in the same shot was in the two series finales.

== Episodes ==
=== Series 1 ===
The first series consists of ten episodes. The pilot episode aired on 10 September 2006.

#	Episode	Summary
1	"The Club of Love"	After a fight in Club 92, Dan and Becs recall how they first met, six months earlier, in the same nightclub under less than ideal circumstances.
2	"All About Becs"	Dan begins to have doubts about his relationship with Rebecca and reverts to his tried and tested method of assessing the situation, the 'Pros & Cons' list.
3	"All About Dan"	After attending an enneagram personality assessment course 'Busy Beaver' Becs begins to question her compatibility with 'Lazy Bear' Dan.
4	"Free Gaff"	With Dan's parents away for the week in Lourdes, Dan and Becs return from Bondai Beach Club, intent on taking full advantage of the 'free gaff'.
5	"Yentl"	Becs is annoyed with Dan when he announces that he doesn't think she's right for the lead role in his new blockbuster film script, 'Undercover Lover'.
6	"Anniversary"	Dan gets into Rebecca's bad books when he forgets the one-year anniversary of their first date.
7	"Mondo"	Becs lands a 'seriously high-profile' modelling job while Dan goes for yet another job interview.
8	"Safe Texts"	Dan and Becs each receive flirtatious text messages... but not from each other.
9	"Break Up"	Dan and Becs recount the horrible events that led to their recent break up.
10	"Premiere"	Dan and Becs have been apart for several months now, and both seem to be moving on with their lives... but can they be happy apart?

=== Series 2 ===
The second series consists of ten episodes. It began broadcasting in September 2007. Episodes were available for viewing online for a week after original broadcast.

#	Episode	Summary
1	"Changes"	Dan returns from a life changing trip to South America as Becs prepares for an important audition. The couple discusses the changes that have taken place in their lives since last we saw them. Dan has a new haircut and is finally "in love". Becs has decided the theatre is probably not for her.
2	"Cheating"	Dan's revelation that he cheated on Becs could not have come at a worse time.
3	"Short"	Dan has received funding for his short film but Becs's agent thinks the lead role is beneath her. Dan is not impressed. When an "old friend" of Dan's offers to play the lead, Becs has one of her trademark changes of heart.
4	"Fair City"	As Becs begins filming her first scenes for Fair City, Dan finally takes the hint from his parents and moves out. Dan is surprised that he is seeing less of his girlfriend now that he has a place of his own. Becs grows weary of Dan's overprotective behaviour.
5	"The Shoot"	Tensions mount as the couple prepares to shoot Dan's first short film. Becs is annoyed that Dan keeps correcting her in rehearsals. To make matters worse Dan is getting stick from his mates for being "whipped" when he hardly even sees Becs any more.
6	"Hallowe'en"	Dan and Becs recall how they first met on Halloween night years earlier. Destiny brought the couple together when they both arrived at the bonfire dressed as their favourite Star Wars characters. Fate kept them apart, however, when Dan chickened out of asking Princess Leia for her phone number. This year they dress as a famous couple.
7	"Dan Og"	When Becs tells Dan she might be pregnant, they each try to imagine their future together. While Dan gradually adjusts to his rosy image of their future together, Becs is not convinced she could tolerate Dan's poor hygiene, night terrors and incessant ukulele playing.
8	"The Realisation"	When Jack calls to console him, Dan is surprised to discover he was dumped by Becs two days earlier. Dan must play this one very carefully if he is to win back his girlfriend. The last thing either of them wants is to end up on some kind of "break".
9	"Messy"	Dan moves home as Becs discovers that her run on Fair City may be coming to an abrupt end. After some "sex with the ex," Dan presumes he and Becs are getting back together. Becs must remind Dan they both agreed the drunken booty call was just a bit of fun. Dan is heartbroken yet again.
10	"Kathryn"	With Becs now living in London, Dan finally moves on with his life, and even lands a new celebrity girlfriend (Kathryn Thomas). The couple recalls a nasty fight that took place as Becs prepared to leave Dublin. Becs realises that she still loves Dan and invites him to live with her in London. Dan agrees (although he is beaten up by Kathryn). They are last seen happy together in a sunny park.
