= Féile FM =

- Belfast; Northern Ireland
- Broadcast area: Belfast area
- Frequency: 103.2 MHz
- Branding: Féile FM 103.2

Programming
- Format: Non-commercial; Community
- Affiliations: Féile an Phobail; Belfast Metropolitan College

Ownership
- Owner: Féile an Phobail

History
- First air date: July 1996
- Last air date: 25 March 2011

Links
- Website: feilefm.com

Féile FM was a community radio station based at Conway Mill in the Gaeltacht Quarter in west Belfast.

The station first broadcast in July 1996 on a 28-day restricted service licence, operating as an outlet for the west Belfast community. Within two years, Féile FM began broadcasting for two four-week periods each year, providing a buildup to Féile an Phobail's Draíocht Children's Arts Festival, their West Belfast Festival and the St Patrick's Day events.

The station was operated under the banner of Féile an Phobail by a radio co-ordinator and a large number of volunteers from the local community. Volunteers were involved in many aspects of the station from hospitality, telephones, news team, production, presenters and even managers.

== History ==
Over the first nine years, Féile FM broadcast on the same frequency of 106.2 FM. This frequency changed to 107.7 FM for the radio broadcast in July/August 2005. Although the station had been a roving unit for many years, broadcasting from various venues, it returned to Conway Mill in February 2004 to a purpose-built studio with a full studio and modern equipment. The studio was created through a partnership between Féile an Phobail and Conway Mill and was funded by the Belfast Local Strategy Partnership.

In October 2005, Féile FM was granted a full-time community radio licence by Ofcom. The terms of the licence allowed Féile FM to take two years to develop the radio station. After the period of two years, Féile FM was granted permission to broadcast throughout the year as opposed to its previous restrictions on broadcasting only in the run-up to St. Patrick's Day and the West Belfast Festival. This allowed the station to provide a full-time community radio service to the entire city of Belfast and across area of counties Antrim and Down.

The station closed at 4pm on Friday 25 March 2011 owing to financial difficulties and increasing overhead costs.
