= Sinéad Ní Uallacháin =

Journalist, actress, artist and radio presenter

- Born: Ballineanig, County Kerry, Ireland
- Occupation: Radio presenter

Sinéad Ní Uallacháin is an Irish journalist, actress, artist, podcaster, continuity announcer and radio presenter.

== Early life ==
Ní Uallacháin was born in Ballineanig, County Kerry. She went on to study art and architecture at the Dublin Institute of Technology in Bolton Street.

== Career ==
Ní Uallacháin became a radio producer and a broadcaster with RTÉ Raidió na Gaeltachta, presenting the weekday show Sinéad ar Maidin (Sinéad in the Morning") until May 2019, and contributing to Cormac ag a Cúig. She did not give up her art however and has illustrated a children's book by Mícheál Ó hUanacháin amongst other works. Ní Uallacháin has been a judge on TG4's series Réalta agus Gaolta.

In the early 2020s, she became a traffic and travel news reader, and continuity announcer on RTÉ Radio 1. In January 2025, she began hosting "SíorStíl", a fashion-design competition, on TG4.

Ní Uallacháin also acts in theatre and has performed in a number of stage shows. In theater she mainly works with Aisteoirí Bulfin. She is on the board of directors for Comharchumann Raidió Átha Cliath Teoranta (C.R.Á.C.T.).

== Beo ar Éigean ==
Ní Uallacháin presents a podcast and radio series Beo ar Éigean ("almost live") with fellow Irish speakers Áine Ní Bhreisleáin and Siún Ní Dhuinn. The three discuss issues from their daily lives.

== Works ==
=== Illustrated books ===
- An Tíogar agus a Mhadra, 2014
- Fighting Words, 2014
- Sin Scéal Eile: Gearrscéalta Nuascríofa, 2010
- NÓS
- The Children of the Finca Florencia

=== Plays ===
- An Campa
- Biffo Béar
- Gur Eile
- Le Luí na Gealaí
- Domhnall Mac Síthigh
- Na Leabhra
