= Alison Spittle =

Irish comedian, writer and actor

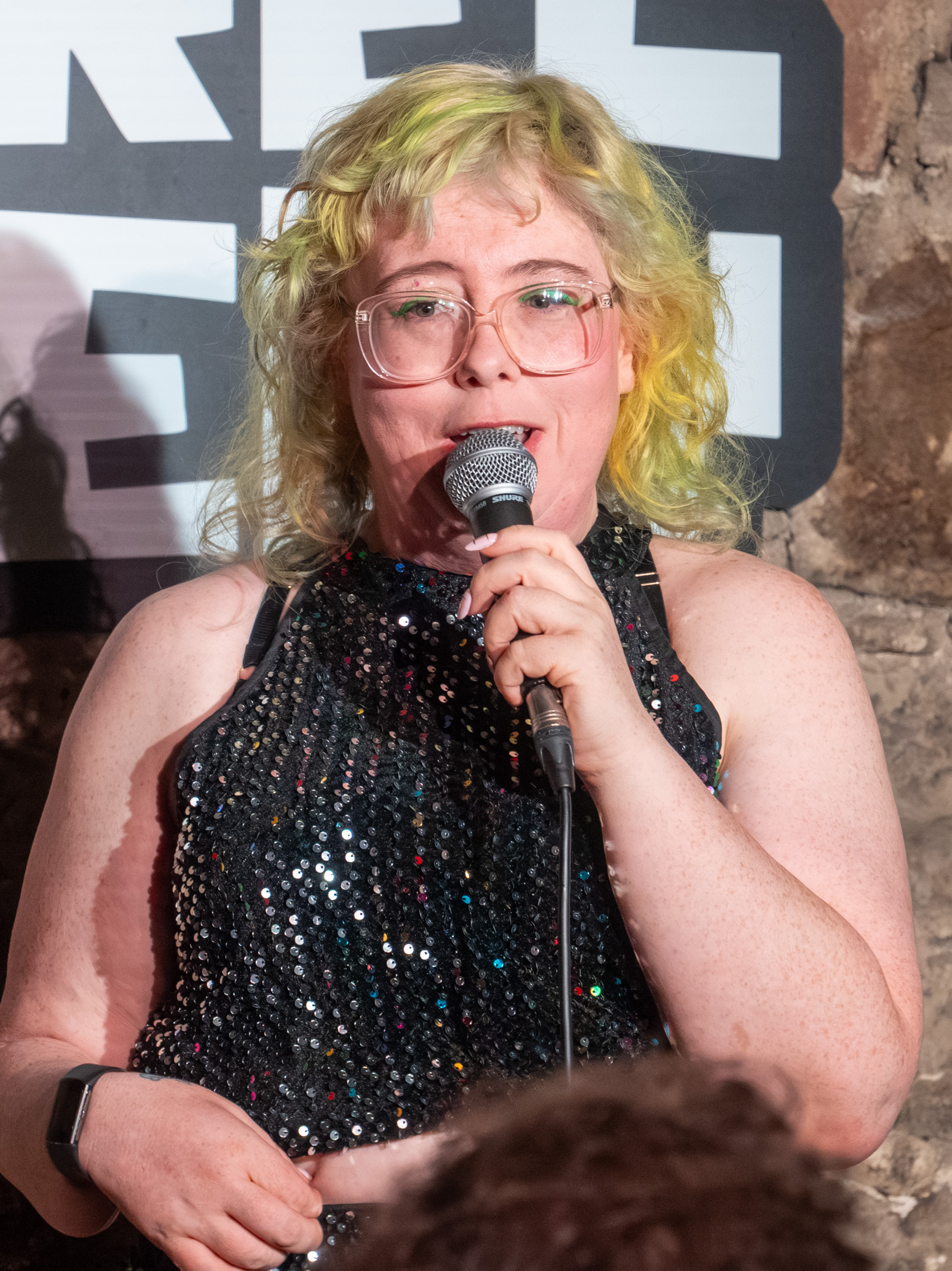
- Spittle at the 2025 Edinburgh Festival Fringe
- Born: 14 June 1989 (age 37); Harrow, London, United Kingdom

Alison Spittle (born 14 June 1989) is an Irish/English comedian, comedy writer, radio producer and actor. She has worked for iRadio, RTÉ Radio 1 and Newstalk and created sketches for Republic of Telly and has written and starred in her RTÉ Two sit-com Nowhere Fast in 2017.

== Early life ==
Spittle was born in Harrow, London. Spittle's English father was a builder. The family moved frequently, including to Dresden, Germany, before moving to Spittle's mother's ancestral home of County Westmeath, Tyrrellspass, Mullingar and finally Ballymore at age eight. She attended secondary school in Moate.

== Career ==
Graduating from college in Dublin, Spittle moved back to Westmeath, where she worked as a researcher for iRadio with comedian Bernard O'Shea. She began working in comedy, supporting PJ Gallagher. This led to her participation in So You Think You're Funny?'s Irish heats, qualifying for rounds in Edinburgh. She got a guest spot on the Happy Hour section of the John Murray Show RTÉ Radio 1 from this success.

Her comedy shows have included Alison Spittle Needs an Agent, Alison Spittle Discovers Hawaii (2015), and Worrier Princess (2017). She has performed at the Edinburgh and Dublin fringe festivals, as well as The Forbidden Fruit and Cork Comedy festivals.

Spittle wrote and starred in web comedy shorts for RTÉ Two, and in sketches for Republic of Telly with Kevin McGahern.

She was a regular contributor to The Right Hook with George Hook on Newstalk. She is also a regular co-host of The Guilty Feminist podcast with Deborah Francis-White.

In 2016 she created the Alison Spittle Show podcast hosted by HeadStuff.org, which she hosted until the podcast's end in 2020.

She appeared in the 2019 comedy film Extra Ordinary.

In 2020, she and fellow comedian Fern Brady started a podcast for the BBC called Wheel of Misfortune. Brady left the podcast in early 2021 and Spittle hosted the show with guests until Kerry Katona became permanent co-host in November 2022. The podcast ended in 2023.

Spittle toured her show Wet in the UK and Ireland in 2022, followed by Soup in 2023.

In November 2023, she appeared on game show Richard Osman's House of Games.

During 2025 and 2026, Alison toured her show Big in the UK, Ireland and Australia, including runs at the Edinburgh Fringe Festival, Dublin Fringe Festival and the Melbourne International Comedy Festival. The show was centred around her experiences of weight-loss and living in a larger body. Spittle received the Best Performer Award at the Dublin Fringe Festival and the Comedians Choice Award at the Edinburgh Fringe Festival for Big.

In 2025, she took part in and won Pointless Celebrities, partnered with Fern Brady.

In 2026, Spittle revived her podcast partnership with best friend Fern Brady launching the podcast Ignore That Feeling.

=== Nowhere Fast ===
In 2017, she co-wrote a six-part sitcom Nowhere Fast with her then boyfriend Simon Mulholland. The series was directed by Simon Gibney. The show sees Angela (played by Spittle) moving back down to Ballybeag in the Midlands, having lost her job on a radio show in Dublin following a high-profile libel case. The series began in November 2017, and was generally well received by critics and viewers.
