= Tessa Khan =

British environmental lawyer

Tessa Khan is an environmental lawyer who lives in the United Kingdom. She co-founded and is co-director of the Climate Litigation Network, which supports legal cases related to climate change mitigation and climate justice.

Khan has argued that national governments have knowingly profited from raising carbon dioxide levels and caused damage to the environment, including as part of the globally important precedent Climate Case Ireland.

== Biography ==
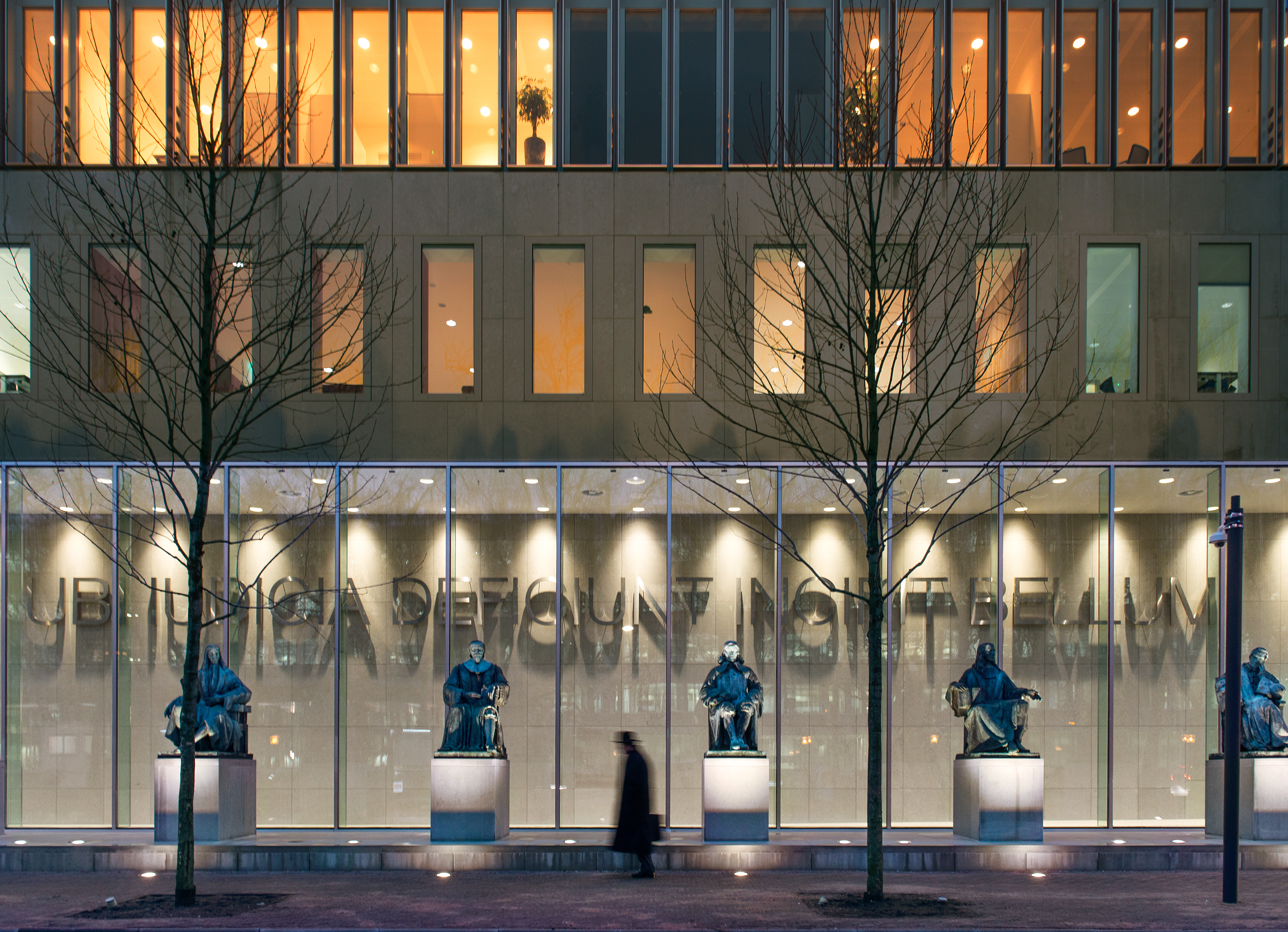
Supreme Court of the Netherlands, The Hague

Tessa Khan has been involved in human rights law and advocacy campaigning.

In Thailand she worked for a women's human-rights non-profit organization. While there in 2015 she learnt of a court ruling at The Hague ordering the Netherlands to reduce its greenhouse-gas emissions. Inspired by the case, Khan moved to London to join Urgenda Foundation's legal team in 2016.

Khan co-founded the Climate Litigation Network with Urgenda Foundation to support climate cases around the world. She serves as the Climate Litigation Network's co-director. Through the organization, she has successfully helped activist groups sue their own governments. It handles cases around the world, including Canada, Netherlands, New Zealand, Norway, Pakistan, and South Korea.

She supported cases in The Netherlands and Ireland that successfully challenged the adequacy of government plans to reduce emissions. In December 2019, in the State of the Netherlands v. Urgenda Foundation case, the Supreme Court of the Netherlands ordered the government to scale back the capacity of coal power stations and oversee around €3 billion in investment for cutting carbon emissions. The win has been described by the Guardian as "the most successful climate lawsuit to date."

In August 2020, in what is known as Climate Case Ireland, the Supreme Court of Ireland ruled that its government must make a new and more ambitious plan to cut carbon. Ireland ranks third in greenhouse gas emissions per capita among European Union countries.

Tessa Khan received the Climate Breakthrough Award in 2018. Time included her in its 2019 list of 15 women leading the fight against climate change.

Khan, writing in The Guardian in July 2024, says that wealthy governments that position themselves as climate leaders — namely the US, Canada, Australia, Norway and the UK — are as culpable for climate damage as the petrostates by continuing to refuse to abandon new oil and gas projects within their borders.

As of July 2024, Khan is the executive director of the climate action organization Uplift.
