= Beo ar Éigean =

Irish-language podcast

- Genre: chat, discussion
- Language: Irish

Cast and voices
- Hosted by: Sinéad Ní Uallacháin; Áine Ní Bhreisleáin; Siún Ní Dhuinn

Technical specifications
- Audio format: weekly radio show, RTÉ Radio 1 podcast iTunes, SoundCloud, Acast, Spotify

Publication
- Original release: 2017 – February 2024
- Provider: Raidió Teilifís Éireann

Related
- Website: www.rte.ie/gaeilge/beo-ar-eigean/

Beo ar Éigean ("almost live") is an Irish-language podcast and radio show produced by Ireland's national broadcaster RTÉ. It was presented by Gaeilgeoirí Sinéad Ní Uallacháin, Áine Ní Bhreisleáin and Siún Ní Dhuinn. The three discussed issues from their daily lives. The podcast was specifically produced in the Irish language, but is not about the language itself.

== Presenters ==
=== Siún Ní Dhuinn ===
Ní Dhuinn is a writer and producer from Dundalk. She is RTÉ's Irish-language digital producer.

=== Áine Ní Bhreisleáin ===
Ní Bhreisleáin is a TV and radio presenter from Gweedore, County Donegal. She presents Bladhaire on RTÉ Raidió na Gaeltachta on Thursdays and Fridays. In 2022 she presented An Cósta Thiar ("The West Coast") on TG4.

=== Sinéad Ní Uallacháin ===
Ní Uallacháin is a journalist, actress, artist and radio presenter from Ballineanig, County Kerry. She had a weekday show "Sinéad ar Maidin" (Sinéad in the Morning") on RnaG until May 2019. In the early 2020s, she became a traffic and travel news reader, and continuity announcer on RTÉ Radio 1.

== See also ==
- List of Irish podcasts
