= Karl Spain =

Irish comedian from Limerick (born 1971)

- Born: Corbally, Limerick City
- Education: CBS Sexton Street
- Occupations: Actor & Writer
- Known for: Karl Spain Wants a Woman, The Panel (Irish TV series) & Podge and Rodge's Stickit Inn
- Television: Killinaskully, Karl Spain Wants a Woman, Podge and Rodge's Stickit Inn, Comedy Store, The Panel (Irish TV series), The Podge and Rodge Show, Tubridy Tonight, The Afternoon Show, The Republic of Telly
- Partners: Rachel O'Keeffe

Karl Spain (born 20 October 1971) is an Irish comedian from Limerick. He is from the Corbally area of the city and was educated at CBS Sexton Street.

In 2000, Spain won the RTÉ award for Best New Act.

Spain appeared at the Montreal Just for Laughs comedy festival in 2003, which was later repeated on RTÉ Television. He is a regular at the Kilkenny Cat Laughs comedy festival.

Spain later ran a series on RTÉ entitled Karl Spain Wants a Woman. He appeared as master of kung-fu on the fifth series of Killinaskully in October 2008.

In 2009 he had yet another TV show on RTÉ Two, Karl Spain wants to Rock.

In March 2010 Karl began a tour as supporting act to fellow Irish comedian, Ed Byrne.

Toured with Kevin Bridges in 2015.

Karl Spain has also been known to attend University of Limerick Comedy Nights.
