= Oliver Callan =

Irish satirist (born 1980)

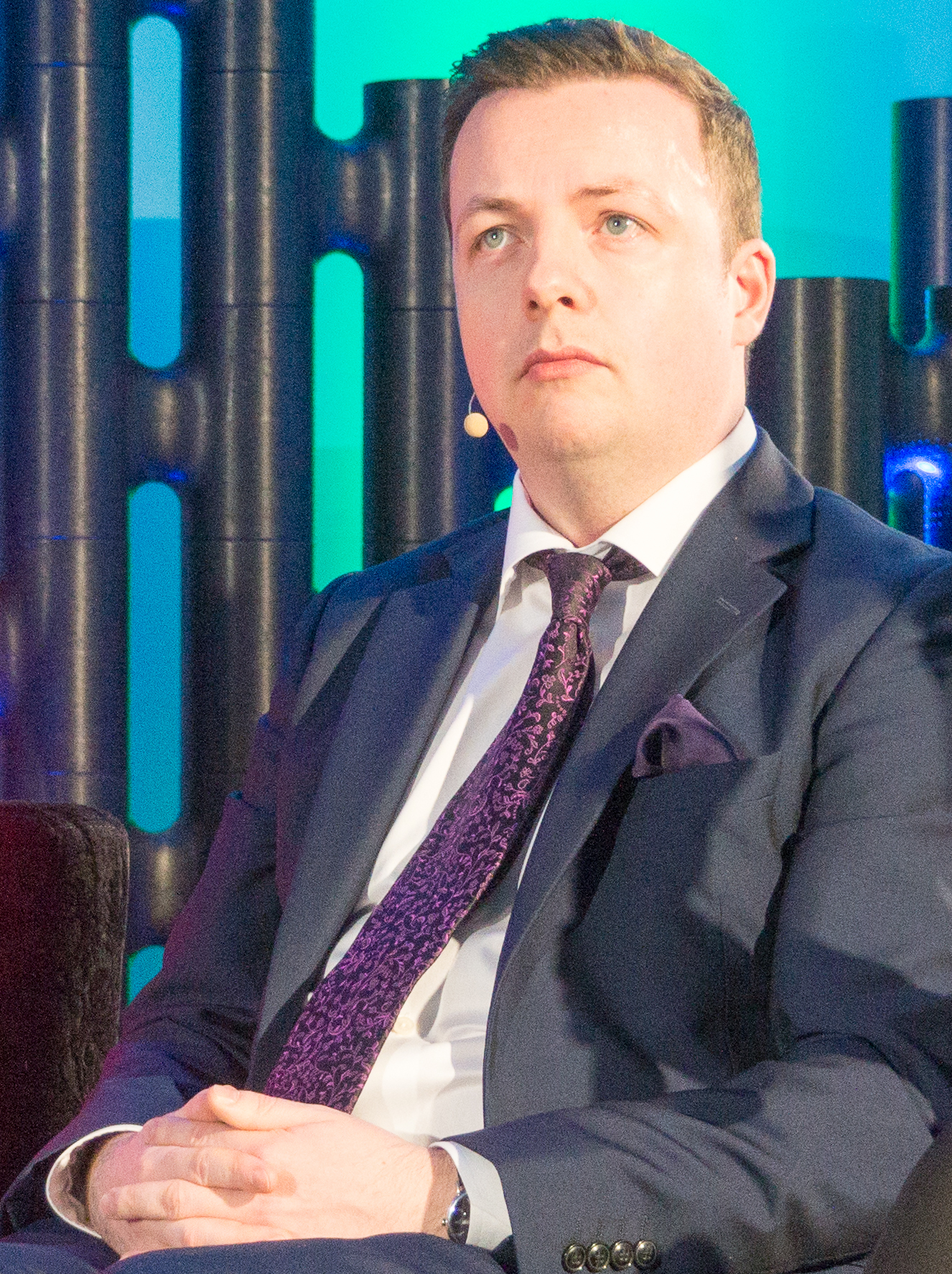
- Callan in 2015 interview
- Born: 27 December 1980 (age 45); Inniskeen, County Monaghan, Ireland
- Notable work: Nob Nation, "Callan's Kicks"

Comedy career
- Medium: Radio sketches, TV sketches, ridiculing of politicians and other public figures
- Website: www.olivercallan.com

Oliver Callan (born 27 December 1980) is an Irish vocal and performance satirist and impressionist known as the creator of Callan's Kicks, Nob Nation and for appearances on The Saturday Night Show. He rose to fame during the 2000s when his daily Nob Nation slots aired on RTÉ Radio. His Callan's Kicks creation on RTÉ Radio 1 has been described by The Sunday Independent as "the best comedy show the national broadcaster has ever produced".

Nob Nation and Callan's Kicks parody political, social and cultural personalities, with Callan performing as the characters featured on the show. His radio broadcasts have led to the release of regular podcasts, several CDs and appearances on prime-time television programmes such as The Saturday Night Show on RTÉ One. He has also incurred the wrath of several politicians and the Kerry football star Paul Galvin over his impressions. He is well known in Ireland for skewering celebrities and politicians on the radio. His acerbic wit and talent for mimicry have made him a household name, according to the Irish Independent.

== Early life ==
Callan is from Inniskeen in County Monaghan. He grew up on a farm and has a degree in journalism from Dublin City University.

Callan initially worked as a newsreader on Today FM where he performed on Gift Grub as Enda Kenny, he later began performing sketches on The Gerry Ryan Show on RTÉ 2fm. He wrote and produced almost 900 Nob Nation sketches on his own for the Gerry Ryan Show over three years.

== Career ==
=== Nob Nation ===
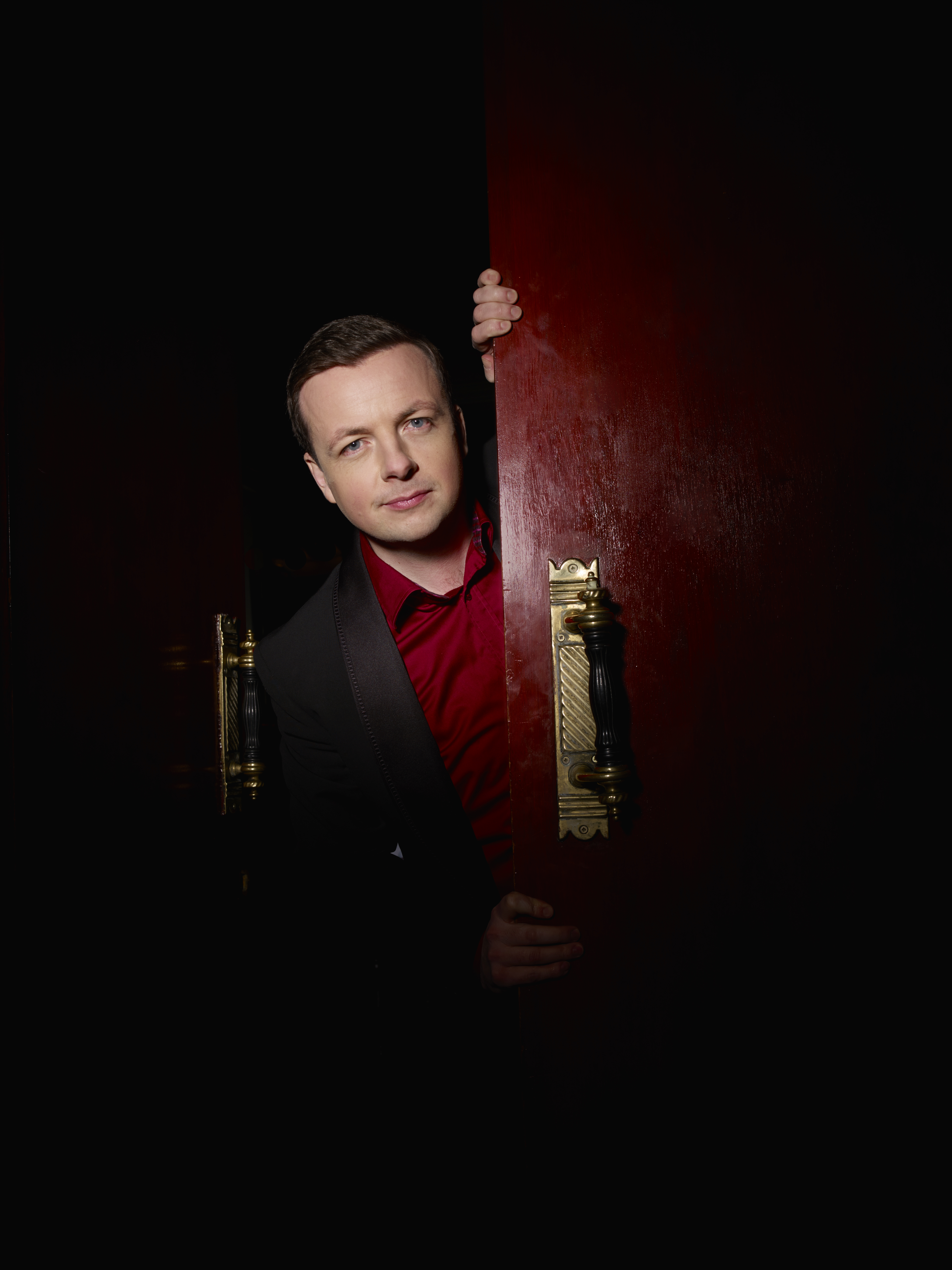
Callan in 2006

Nob Nation was Callan's first foray into comedy and was a sketch insert on The Gerry Ryan Show from 2007 until the presenter's death in 2010. Nob Nation even produced a comedy sketch just days after Gerry Ryan's death in tribute to the broadcaster.

Nob Nation was reported in the Sunday Independent on 20 January 2008 as being Ireland's most popular podcast of the previous year, with figures showing a total of 736,711 downloads on RTÉ.ie between April and December 2007. Comparatively, RTÉ Radio 1's most popular radio show, Morning Ireland, was second with 730,965 podcast downloads. Nob Nation was also in the top five of the iTunes chart multiple times.

His impersonations of Eamon Dunphy and David Norris led to a warning from the Broadcasting Commission of Ireland (BAI) in July 2008. The BAI deemed his impersonations "offensive to homosexuals" and said they "promoted binge drinking".

Following some complaints about Callan's portrayal of Taoiseach Brian Cowen "swaying and snorting in booze-filled sing-songs about his difficulties in office", the popularity of the slot "simply exploded" according to RTÉ, with over 250,000 hits each month and making up almost a third of all downloads from RTÉ.ie. Callan's portrayal of Enda Kenny as cross-dresser "Dame Enda" has drawn reactions from Fine Gael and Enda Kenny himself.

The first Nob Nation CD, containing twenty of Callan's sketches, was released in Ireland in November 2007 and went platinum. Those parodied on the compilation include politicians Bertie Ahern and Enda Kenny, former Republic of Ireland national football team manager Steve Staunton, broadcaster Gay Byrne and newsreaders Bryan Dobson and Colm Murray. The album debuted at number five on the Irish Albums Chart ahead of Amy Winehouse and Bruce Springsteen on 9 November 2007, according to IRMA, the official chart tracking body in Ireland. A second compilation, Nob Nation 2: The Recession Album, was released on 7 November 2008. Nob Nation 3 was released in the Irish Daily Mail in November 2009. The fourth compilation in the series, Nob Nation 4: The Hangover, was released on 12 December 2010 in the Irish News of the World.

In August 2010, a new website www.nobnation.com showcasing comedy videos and purportedly uncensored versions of Nob Nation podcasts appeared. A number of Sunday newspapers reported that the website featured controversial depictions of Brian Cowen in a bar along with Judge Gargle, a fictional character loosely based on a high-profile Irish judge.

Callan once rang Charlie Bird and, impersonating Enda Kenny, said there was a story about to break about Kenny buying women's underwear. Bird thought it was real.

=== Callan's Kicks/The Saturday Night Show ===
Callan now works on Callan's Kicks, a sketch show on RTÉ Radio One and on RTÉ One television.

The radio version of the show has led to controversy over his portrayal of Ireland's President Michael D. Higgins and his aide Kevin McCarthy which led to RTÉ producers ordering Callan to tone down on.

The Callan's Kicks TV spin-off debuted on New Year's Eve 2013. Callan Kicks the Year proved a hit with viewers on RTÉ One television, and its ratings beat Christmas specials by rivals The Mario Rosenstock Show and Irish Pictorial Weekly.

The show once again proved controversial in its portrayal of the President and his aide leading the Sunday World to publish a front-page story on the programme before it aired.

Callan's Kicks debut TV series followed in July 2014 and it too proved to be a ratings success with over 400,000 viewers tuning in each Friday night, beating Eastenders, Prime Time, Fair City and Saturday Night with Miriam.

A second Christmas special on RTÉ One Television followed in December 2014. Callan Kicks the Year featured Dobbo and other characters parodying events of the year like the Irish Water, Rehab and Cronyism scandals; President Michael D. Higgins' state visit to the United Kingdom and also debuted new characters, Bono and the Gleesons.

In October 2011, Callan was allegedly assaulted by Kerry football star Paul Galvin late at night in Kehoe's Pub, Central Dublin. Among witnesses to the alleged incident were a Government Minister, a TD, a senator and several journalists. One witness alleged Galvin called Callan a "fucking cunt". The incident was investigated by the Garda Síochána. The media speculated on the reason behind the alleged incident, reporting that Callan had recently mimicked Galvin asking Taoiseach Enda Kenny to man-up by giving him a body-wax on radio.' and that Galvin had texted Callan before an appearance on The Saturday Night Show in relation to "gay jibes" the satirist had directed at him. It was eventually revealed that Galvin had complained (or not complained at all) to RTÉ after what he described as "the most excruciating night of my life" at home on his sofa between his parents in Kerry watching The Saturday Night Show when Callan referred to Galvin's "years spent in the closet".

Callan impersonated Galvin again on the radio the week after the alleged assault. Callan then appeared on The Saturday Night Show for an unprecedented second consecutive week to defend himself against accusations of homophobia by coming out on live television.

=== Live ===
Callan performed five sell-out nights live at Dublin's Olympia Theatre between September 2008 and May 2013. Paul Galvin featured in that live show along with over fifty other characters. He has also performed shows nationwide and appeared in viral adverts for Lidl, The Irish Sun and Paddy Power.

=== RTÉ Radio 1 ===
On 20 January 2024, RTÉ announced that Callan would become the new host of the 9am slot on RTÉ Radio 1 taking over from Ryan Tubridy.
