= Maeve Higgins =

Irish comedian

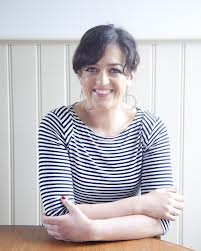
- Maeve Higgins in 2014
- Born: Maeve Anna Higgins; 24 March 1981 (age 45); Cobh, County Cork, Ireland
- Notable work: Naked Camera ‘’Wait Wait... Don't Tell Me!’’ Maeve Higgins' Fancy Vittles

Comedy career
- Years active: 2004–present
- Medium: Stand-up, television
- Genres: Observational comedy, sketch

Maeve Anna Higgins (24 March 1981) is an Irish comedian from Cobh, County Cork, Ireland and is based in New York City. She was a principal actor and writer of the RTÉ television production Naked Camera, as well as for her own show Maeve Higgins' Fancy Vittles. Her book of essays We Have A Good Time, Don't We? was published by Hachette in 2012. She wrote for The Irish Times and produces radio documentaries. She previously appeared on The Ray D'Arcy Show on Today FM. She is a regular panellist on the NPR radio show Wait Wait... Don't Tell Me! Higgins appeared in her first starring film role in the 2019 Irish comedy Extra Ordinary.

== Career ==
Higgins started in comedy in 2005 and has written and performed at many festivals and shows. She began her comedy career on the national radio station Today FM after auditioning for The Ray D'Arcy Show in February 2004. She failed to win.

From 2005 to 2007, she took part in the hidden camera show Naked Camera with fellow comedian and friend P. J. Gallagher. She landed her own television show, Maeve Higgins' Fancy Vittles, in 2009. Since 2010, she has occasionally performed with Josie Long and Isy Suttie.

=== 2006–2010 ===
2006

- 'Ha Ha Yum' with sister, Lilly, at the Edinburgh Festival Fringe

2007

- 'Slightly Amazing' at the Adelaide Fringe Festival
- 'My News' at the Edinburgh Festival Fringe

2008

- 'Ha Ha Yum' with Claudia O'Doherty at the Melbourne International Comedy Festival
- 'Kitten Brides' at the Edinburgh Festival Fringe
- 'I Can't Sleep', a children's play written by David O'Doherty. Higgins performed this skit with O'Doherty at the Edinburgh Festival Fringe.

2009

- 'Kitten Brides' at the Melbourne International Comedy Festival
- 'I Can't Sleep' at the Melbourne International Comedy Festival
- 'Kitten Brides' at the New Zealand International Comedy Festival

2010

- 'A Rare Sight' at the Brisbane Comedy Festival and Melbourne International Comedy Festival. Performed with Nick Coyle.
- 'A Rare Sight' at the New Zealand International Comedy Festival. Nick Coyle could not attend due to surgery on shoulder.
- 'Personal Best' at the Edinburgh Fringe Festival

=== Film ===
- 2019: Extra Ordinary – Rose Dooley

=== Television ===
==== As herself ====
- 2008: Spicks and Specks
- 2005, 2006: Tubridy Tonight
- 2009: The Podge and Rodge Show
- 2009: Talkin' 'Bout Your Generation
- 2009: The Modest Adventures of David O'Doherty
- 2009: Maeve Higgins' Fancy Vittles
- 2015: StarTalk with Neil deGrasse Tyson

==== Acting work ====
- 2005–2007: Naked Camera – various characters
- 2006: Magic – Chloe
- 2012: Moone Boy
- 2015: Inside Amy Schumer
- 2016: Doc McStuffins – Gillian
- 2019: Extra Ordinary – Rose Dooley

==== As writer ====
- 2005–2007: Naked Camera
- 2009: Maeve Higgins' Fancy Vittles
- 2012: We Have A Good Time, Don't We?
- 2022: Tell Everyone on This Train I Love Them

=== Books ===
- 2018: Maeve in America

=== Radio ===
- 'What Would Maeve Do?' on The Ray D'Arcy Show
- 2016: The Unbelievable Truth (Series 16, Episodes 3 & 6)
- 2018–present: Wait Wait... Don't Tell Me
- 2018: Everything Is Alive

=== Podcast ===
- 2018–present: Mothers of Invention

== "Assistance dog" controversy ==
Higgins received criticism from disability campaigners when she stated on 30 March 2018 on the Irish Late Late Show that she purchased a service dog vest on Amazon and pretended that her pet dog was a service dog during a trans-Atlantic flight. She has apologised to anyone offended by her deception.
