= P. J. Gallagher (comedian) =

Irish comedian

P.J. Gallagher
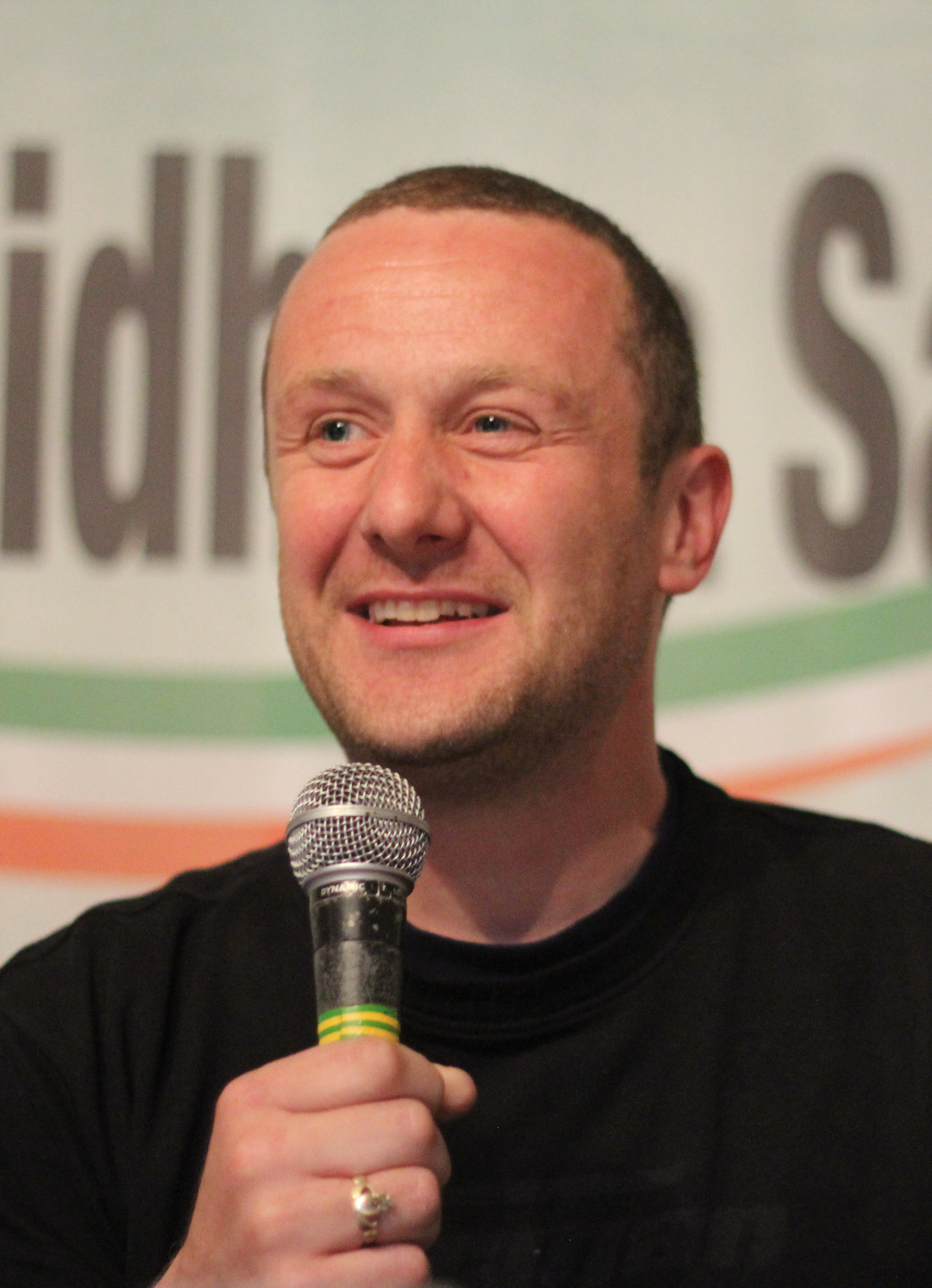
- Gallagher performing in 2014 at a local pub
- Born: Paul Joseph Gallagher; 18 April 1975 (age 51); Cork, Ireland
- Education: St Paul's College, Raheny, Dublin
- Spouse: Elaine Stewart (m. 2013; sep. 2016)
- Partner: Kelly Doolin
- Children: 2

P. J. Gallagher (born 18 April 1975) is an Irish stand-up comedian, actor, radio presenter and co-creator of the television show Naked Camera. His various characters in the programme include a mentally unstable taxi driver, ladies' man Jake Stevens and a "Dirty Auld One", an old woman who makes sexual comments. A massive Leeds utd fan. He is part of the breakfast show team on Radio Nova with the award-winning presenter Jim McCabe.

== Early life and career ==
Gallagher was born on 18 April 1975 in Cork, Ireland. He is an alumnus of St Paul's College, Raheny. In June 2013, Gallagher married Elaine Stewart who was his long-term girlfriend. He is also friends with fellow comedian Jason Byrne, and he has worked on BBC's The I Hate Show. Gallagher is also a motorbike racer. He has revealed he has reactive arthritis.

He participated in season 4 of Celebrity Bainisteoir managing St Patrick's GAA Club Donabate, Dublin.

He was in Meet Your Neighbours, when RTÉ put him on RTÉ One.

He presented PJ and Jim in the Morning with Jim McCabe on Classic Hits until April 2021. On 1 April 2021, PJ and co-host Jim McCabe moved from Ireland's Classic Hits to Radio Nova to present the new 'Morning Glory' breakfast programme.

Starting from 21 October 2015, P.J. also presents Dubland with Suzanne Kane.

== Filmography ==
=== Film ===
Year	Title	Role	Notes
2005	Hamlet	Gravedigger	
2006	Mebollox	Patsy	Short
2016	The Young Offenders	Barry	

=== Television ===
Title	Year	Role	Network	Notes	Ref(s)
Podge and Rodge: A Scare at Bedtime	2005	Taxi Driver	RTÉ Two	1 episode	
Naked Camera	2005–2007	Various	RTÉ Two	Lead; Also Writer	
The Podge and Rodge Show	2006	Himself	RTÉ Two	1 episode	
Podge and Rodge's Stickit Inn	2009	Himself	RTÉ Two		
Meet Your Neighbours	2011	Himself	Various	RTÉ One	Also Writer
Celebrity Bainisteoir	2011	Himself	Season 4	RTÉ One	
Trojan Donkey	2013	Jumperman			
Next Week's News	2014	Team Captain			
The Young Offenders	2018–present	Principal Barry Walsh	RTÉ2; BBC Three	20 episodes	
Uncharted With Ray Goggins	2026	Himself		1 episode	
