= Even Better Than the Real Thing Vol. 3 =

Compilation album

Compilation album by various artists
- Released: 2005
- Recorded: Dublin, Ireland, 2005
- Genres: Acoustic, pop, cover songs
- Length: 2 discs, 96:00
- Label: RMG Chart Entertainment Ltd.

Even Better Than the Real Thing series chronology
Even Better Than the Real Thing Vol. 2 (2004)	Even Better Than the Real Thing Vol. 3 (2005)

Even Better than the Real Thing Vol. 3 is an Irish charity two-disc album featuring a variety of artists performing acoustic covers. Despite the title of the series being taken from a U2 song, the previous albums did not contain any U2 covers. This third, two-disc volume departs from this and is entirely composed of U2 songs, many of them by artists who recorded covers for volume one or volume two.

It was released in 2005 by RMG Chart Entertainment Ltd., and like the other albums, most of the songs were recorded "live and acoustic" on The Ray D'Arcy Show on Today FM. Proceeds from the album were donated to the UNICEF Tsunami relief fund.

== Track listing ==
All tracks are written by U2, with lyrics by Bono.

Side one
No.	Title	Covered by	Length
1.	"All I Want Is You"	Mark Geary	4:00
2.	"40"	The Frames	4:38
3.	"When Love Comes to Town"	Declan O'Rourke	3:31
4.	"Seconds"	Mundy	3:46
5.	"Mothers of the Disappeared"	Paddy Casey	3:15
6.	"Heartland"	Bell X1	3:59
7.	"So Cruel"	Erin McKeown	3:23
8.	"Even Better Than the Real Thing"	Jack L	3:15
9.	"Running to Stand Still"	Mickey Harte	5:12
10.	"October"	Divine Comedy	2:34
11.	"Sunday Bloody Sunday"	Lisa Bresnan	4:32
12.	"Who's Gonna Ride Your Wild Horses"	Tom Baxter	5:11

Side two
No.	Title	Covered by	Length
1.	"One"	Jerry Fish and the Mudbug Club	4:02
2.	"New Year's Day"	Aslan	4:33
3.	"With or Without You"	The Walls	3:56
4.	"I Still Haven't Found What I'm Looking For"	Juliet Turner	4:17
5.	"Love Is Blindness"	The Devlins featuring Sharon Corr	3:19
6.	"Bad"	Luka Bloom	5:27
7.	"Who's Gonna Ride Your Wild Horses"	Picturehouse	5:20
8.	"A Sort of Homecoming"	Hazel Kaneswaran	4:13
9.	"Love Rescue Me"	Roesy	4:53
10.	"Vertigo"	Elvis & Kevin Doyle	3:28
11.	"Sunday Bloody Sunday"	Damien Dempsey	4:35
12.	"Van Diemen's Land"	George Murphy	3:47
13.	"Sweetest Thing"	St Fiachra’s Junior School Choir	2:39

== See also ==
- Even Better Than the Real Thing Vol. 1
- Even Better Than the Real Thing Vol. 2
