= Even Better Than the Disco Thing =

Compilation album
- Released: 2008
- Recorded: Marconi House, Digges Lane, Dublin, Ireland (2008)
- Genre: Acoustic, pop, cover versions
- Label: Today FM/RMG Chart
- Producer: Jenny Kelly; Will Hanafin; Siobhan Hogan; Ann Gleeson; Mairead Farrell; Gavin Blake; Pat Balfe; Colin McElarney

chronology
Even Better Than the Real Thing Vol. 3 (2005)	Even Better Than the Disco Thing (2008)

Even Better Than the Disco Thing is an Irish charity album released by the commercial FM radio station, Today FM, for the Christmas market on 21 November 2008. The album features covers of well-known disco songs by a selection of Irish musicians. Disc one features sixteen tracks, whilst disc two is labelled "Mix CD" and contains twelve of the same sixteen tracks all over again. All the songs were performed and recorded live on The Ray D'Arcy Show. The title is a pun on the Even Better Than the Real Thing series of charity CDs recorded in previous years on D'Arcy's show, but temporarily discontinued after the third edition in 2005. They themselves are a reference to the U2 song "Even Better Than the Real Thing". Funds raised were donated to the National Children's Hospital and Barretstown.

== Track listing ==
=== Disc one ===
1. Eric Bibb - "Dancing Queen"
2. Lisa Hannigan - "Upside Down"
3. Cathy Davey - "I Feel Love"
4. Director - "Ring My Bell"
5. Martin Staunton and the Sharon Shannon band - "Superstition"
6. Duke Special - "I Feel for You"
7. Juno Falls - "Last Night a DJ Saved My Life"
8. Republic of Loose - "Jive Talkin'"
9. Declan O'Rourke - "Young Hearts"
10. Jape - "Hot Stuff"
11. Fred - "Fame"
12. Jack L - "Stayin' Alive" (referred to as "Staying Alive")
13. Brian Kennedy - "Never Can Say Goodbye"
14. The Blizzards (credited as Blizzards) - "Temptation"
15. Kevin Doyle - "Get Down on It"
16. Prison Love - "Disco Inferno"

=== Disc two ===
1. Duke Special - "I Feel for You"
2. Lisa Hannigan - "Upside Down"
3. Juno Falls - "Last Night a DJ Saved My Life"
4. Republic of Loose - "Jive Talkin'"
5. Kevin Doyle - "Get Down on It"
6. Martin Staunton and the Sharon Shannon band - "Superstition"
7. Declan O'Rourke - "Young Hearts"
8. Cathy Davey - "I Feel Love"
9. Director - "Ring My Bell"
10. Fred - "Fame"
11. Jape - "Hot Stuff"
12. The Blizzards - "Temptation"

== Reception ==
Tony Clayton-Lea of The Irish Times gave the album an unfavourable review. He commented, "If the image of Brian Kennedy strangling Never Can Say Goodbye, Jack L neutering Staying Alive, Juno Falls smothering Last Night a DJ Saved My Life, Fred defaming Fame, and Director stifling Ring My Bell are enough to turn you off your Christmas pudding, then so be it." However, he praised the tracks by Eric Bibb, Lisa Hannigan and Cathy Davey.
