= Even Better Than the Real Thing (disambiguation) =

"Even Better Than the Real Thing" is a 1991 song by U2.

Even Better Than the Real Thing may also refer to:

- Even Better than the Real Thing (art exhibition), title of the 2024 Whitney Biennial in New York City
- "Even Better Than The Real Thing" (Instant Star), a 2004 episode of the TV series Instant Star
- Even Better Than the Real Thing (charity album series), a series of Irish charity albums
- Even Better Than the Real Thing (TV series), a 2017 BBC TV series; see 2017 in British television

== See also ==
- Even Better Than the Disco Thing
