= Ray D'Arcy =

Irish radio and television presenter

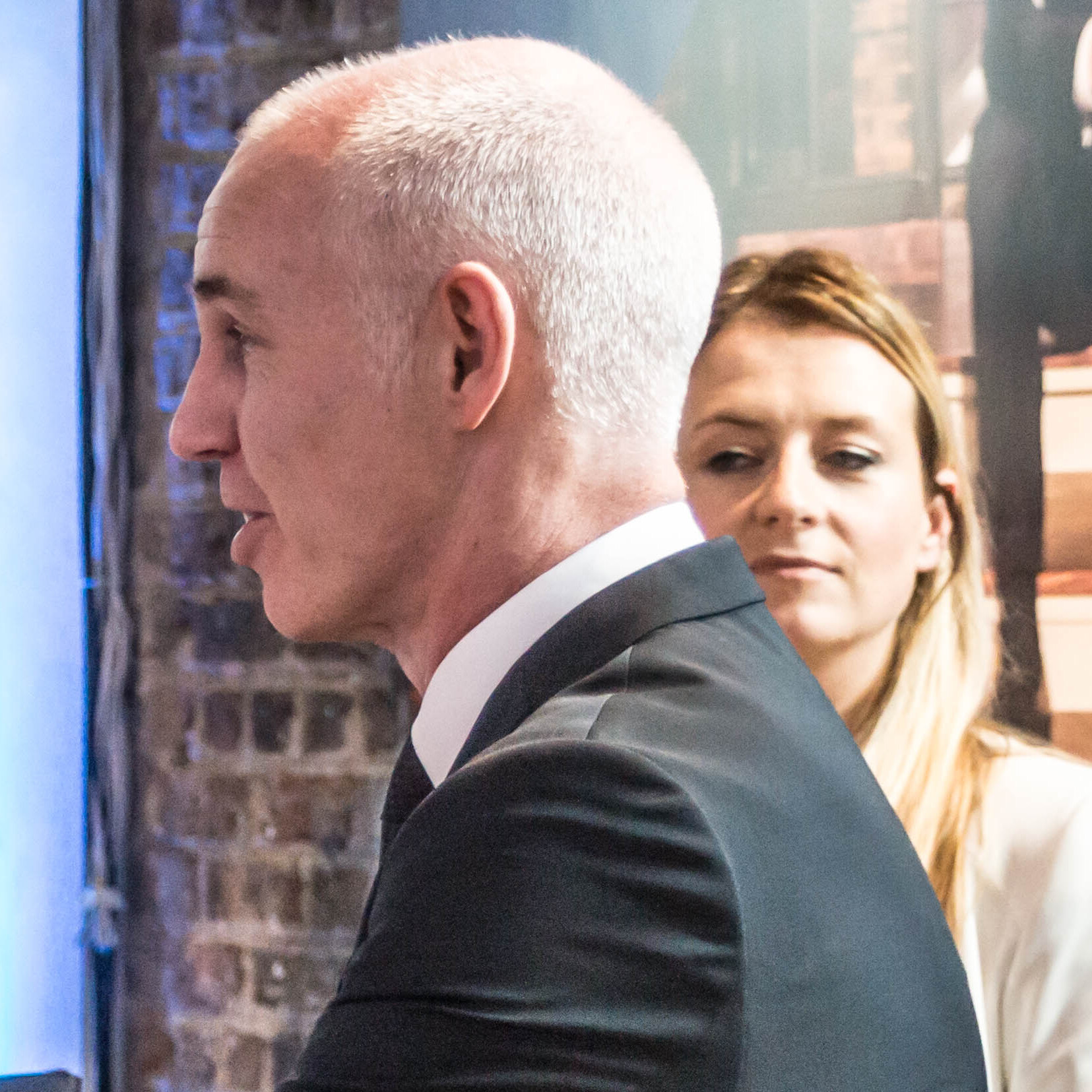
- Ray D'Arcy in 2015
- Born: Raymond Michael D'Arcy; 1 September 1964 (age 62); Kildare, Ireland
- Education: Psychology graduate
- Alma mater: Trinity College Dublin
- Occupations: Radio presenter; TV presenter
- Employer: RTÉ
- Spouse: Jenny Kelly (m. 2013)
- Children: Kate; Tom

Raymond Michael D'Arcy (born 1 September 1964) is an Irish television and radio presenter.

D'Arcy came to prominence in the 1990s with a television career on RTÉ, presenting children's television on The Den, a quiz show called Blackboard Jungle and the youth music show 2Phat. In the 2000s he presented television coverage of The Rose of Tralee beauty pageant each August for four consecutive years until 2010. He hosted a number of television programmes with RTÉ and UTV during the 2000s and 2010s, including The Ray D'Arcy Show from 2015-2019.

D'Arcy presented a self-titled weekday morning radio programme on Today FM from 1998 to 2014. His professional partner on that show, Jenny Kelly, became his wife on 24 August 2013 and they have two children.

D'Arcy rejoined RTÉ Radio, hosting a show on RTÉ Radio 1 from 2015 to 2025.

== Early life ==
D'Arcy was born into a working-class family of nine with one earner, his father, a non-commissioned officer, in Tipperary in 1964. His grandmother died at the age of 54 from lung cancer when D'Arcy was 11.

Always into his music and his broadcasting, D'Arcy began discoing in 1979 at the age of 15. He attended Trinity College Dublin, to take a degree in psychology, and graduated in 1985.

== Career ==
D'Arcy has been a presenter for both TV and radio, beginning this career by joining RTÉ Raidió na Gaeltachta in 1985.

=== Television ===
D'Arcy's first position as TV presenter began in 1988 on the show Jo Maxi.

In 1990, D'Arcy replaced Ian Dempsey as the presenter of The Den, RTÉ's flagship children's television series. He remained its main human presenter until 1998. His career in children's television later featured in the 2008 documentary Best Bitz From Back Den. D'Arcy also presented the quiz show Blackboard Jungle at the time before presenting youth music quiz 2Phat. In addition, he presented the UTV and RTÉ collaborative travel show Bon Voyage! for one season. He was the presenter of several short-running or once-off broadcasts for RTÉ, including Ireland's version of the Test The Nation franchise and the Irish Young Scientist Awards. Until 2005 he presented You're a Star, a talent show established to find Ireland's entrant for the Eurovision Song Contest. In 2005, D'Arcy took over as Rose of Tralee presenter. On 1 April 2010, after five years, he stood down so as to spend more time with his family as they grew older. Television roles dried up as the 2000s progressed, though he presented When Dreams Come True in 2005 and hosted Eurosong 2008 at the University of Limerick Concert Hall. and presented one episode of The Panel later that year. That same year, he ruled out applying to host The Late Late Show, despite being linked to this prime-time slot. On 1 December 2008, he announced on his Today FM radio show that he would be participating in the second season of Celebrity Bainisteoir; he managed County Kildare team Rathangan.

D'Arcy hosted a chat show on RTÉ Television from 2016-2019.

=== Radio ===
In 1998, one year after the station's launch, D'Arcy began presenting The Ray D'Arcy Show on Today FM. Initially the show occupied the 10:00 to 12:45 timeslot, replacing a show presented by Tim Kelly. This slot was later changed to 9:00 to 12:00, entering direct competition with The Gerry Ryan Show on RTÉ 2fm. D'Arcy credited much of the show's success to the team that served him well over the years: Jenny Kelly, Will Hanafin and Mairead Farrell. The show achieved something of a cult status due to its "quirky" segments, among which were "Fix-It Friday" and the "Odd One Out Quiz".

On the weekend of 21–22 March 2009, someone placed nude images of the then Taoiseach in the National Gallery of Ireland and the gallery of the Royal Hibernian Academy. The artist anonymously emailed D'Arcy's radio show, claiming responsibility for the creation of the paintings, but not their hanging. Gardaí subsequently raided the Today FM studios and producer Will Hanafin was asked to hand over the emails, on the basis that the placing of the paintings constituted indecency, incitement and criminal damage. Hanafin refused to provide the emails without a warrant. In July 2014, D'Arcy experienced backlash from mixed martial arts fans by inviting Cathal Pendred onto his show then grilling him on his part in the "violent and disturbing" sport.

In December 2014, D'Arcy left Today FM. He resumed his employment as radio presenter with RTÉ Radio after being approached by them "a number of times" over the years. The Ray D'Arcy Show continued as a broadcast on RTÉ Radio One. It was later announced that his wife Jenny Kelly would join him at RTÉ to produce the new radio show. His first show back at RTÉ went out on 2 February 2015 on Radio 1. His show began airing every weekday from 3 to 4.30pm. Incoming RTÉ Board chair Moya Doherty said at the time that sponsorship would "more than cover" D'Arcy's RTÉ salary.

On 6 October 2019 it was revealed that The Ray D'Arcy Show would run from September to December, being replaced by a female-led chat show from January to May.

RTÉ announced the end of The Ray D'Arcy Show and D'Arcy's departure on 9 October 2025.

=== RTÉ earnings ===
In December 2018, RTÉ published his salary of €450,000 for 2016, up from €400,000 which he earned in 2015. In June 2023, D'Arcy gave a current salary of €250,000 per year, just for the radio show (he was not working in television at the time).

=== BAI compliance issues ===
D'arcy's programmes have been the source of several complaints to the Broadcasting Authority of Ireland. In December 2015 the BAI upheld three complaints (it partially upheld two complaints about the same broadcast and rejected two others) of bias about an interview D'Arcy had with Colm O'Gorman about Amnesty Ireland's campaign to change Ireland's laws on abortion. In May 2016, the BAI ruled for a second time that D'Arcy's programme lacked objectivity when he interviewed Graham Linehan and his wife, Helen, on her need to have an abortion in the UK following the discovery that a foetus she was carrying had a fatal abnormality. In December 2016 the BAI upheld two complaints about an interview D'Arcy conducted on 9 June 2016 surrounding the United Nations Human Right's Committee periodic assessment of Ireland's human rights record. D'arcy conducted an interview with campaigners for abortion but failed to mention that they were campaigners. The unanimous opinion of the BAI committee was that the program lacked objectivity and impartiality and went so far to note that this was the third time a complaint was upheld against D'Arcy on this issue and it was a matter of concern to them. They issued RTE with a 'Warning Notice' over the violation in order to underline the seriousness.

== Personal life ==
A household name in Ireland, D'Arcy does not consider himself a celebrity and tends to decline requests for interviews. While being interviewed on The Saturday Night Show in 2010, D'Arcy issued an ultimatum to Enda Kenny, "vowing he would leave Ireland" after the February 2011 general election if the man became Taoiseach. Kenny did become Taoiseach; D'Arcy did not leave the country.

=== Family ===
Previously engaged to TV presenter Geri Maye, D'Arcy married Jenny Kelly, his producer and co-presenter, on 24 August 2013. The pair were stalked by the press when D'Arcy publicly exposed their partnership on Saturday Night With Miriam in 2005. Afterwards, D'Arcy was dismissive of the public interest in the relationship:

"I guess once we have actually told people we are together that will be the end of it. Our listeners probably care that we are a couple, but beyond that I don't know why anyone would be interested."

Their daughter was born on 25 November 2006 after Jenny went into labour while laughing at Pat Kenny being heckled on The Late Late Show. In January 2012, D'Arcy and Kelly announced their engagement and pregnancy with a second child. In June that year, D'Arcy and Kelly welcomed their second child, a boy. Earlier that year, D'Arcy tripped and broke his nose and had to have surgery.

The D'Arcy family have a dog called Teddy.

D'Arcy's father Ray D'Arcy Snr died on 28 December 2017.

== Awards ==
D'Arcy won a Jacob's Award in 1993 for his presentation of The Den. In 2005, 2006 and 2007 Ray won the Best Irish Radio DJ award at the Meteor Music Awards, cementing his position as one of Ireland's most popular radio presenters. D'Arcy always maintains that this should be seen as a group award, and that credit should be shared with Jenny Kelly, Mairead Farrell and producer Will Hanafin, who also contributes to presenting the show. In 2008 D'Arcy was beaten by his namesake Ray Foley who launched a daily campaign to dethrone him.

In 2006, The Ray D'Arcy Show won the Community/Social Action award at the PPI Irish Radio Awards for their work in highlighting road safety problems and deaths on the roads in Ireland. This was due in part, to their "Don't be a Fucking Eejit" radio adverts, which contained real-life stories.

In 2007, The Ray D'Arcy Show won the Best Light Entertainment Programme award at the PPI Irish Radio Awards.

Year	Nominee / work	Award	Result
1993	Ray D'Arcy	Jacob's Award	Won
2005	Ray D'Arcy	Best Irish DJ at the Meteor Awards	Won
2006	Ray D'Arcy	Best Irish DJ at the Meteor Awards	Won
2006	The Ray D'Arcy Show	Community/Social Action award at the PPI Irish Radio Awards	Won
2007	Ray D'Arcy	Best Irish DJ at the Meteor Awards	Won
2007	The Ray D'Arcy Show	Best Light Entertainment Programme award at the PPI Irish Radio Awards	Won
2008	Ray D'Arcy	Best Irish DJ at the Meteor Awards	Nominated
