= Ann Gleeson =

Irish radio personality

- Education: Dublin Business School
- Occupation: Presenter
- Employer: Today FM
- Parent(s): Liam Gleeson, Anne Gleeson

Ann Gleeson is an Irish radio personality who has presented, produced and featured on numerous Today FM shows. She is from Nenagh.

== Early life ==
Gleeson is the youngest of nine children, she has seven brothers and one sister. She was born and raised in Nenagh, County Tipperary. She was brought up by her mother Anne ("with an e") and her father Liam.

== Career ==
Gleeson gained cult status for her slots on Tom Dunne's radio show Pet Sounds. Dunne would constantly include Gleeson, whom he would refer to as his "assistant Ann", with him, in his show and the two developed a nightly competition where she would hum an obscure track for the listeners to guess.

Later Gleeson did her "Ann Does Ireland!" feature on The Ray Foley Show. "Ann Does Ireland!" saw Gleeson travel Ireland on a weekly basis describing towns and cities in a humorous and satirical manner for Foley's lunchtime listeners. This led to her taking on an increasing role in the show, substituting for regular female co-host Adelle McDonnell and making contributions to the show's blog. Her involvement peaked when McDonnell married and took a five-week honeymoon, Gleeson filling in for her on twenty-five consecutive days only for Foley to jokingly claim on her departure that she only showered once every fortnight. She returned when Adelle went to Uganda on a pilgrimage.

Gleeson was also involved in the special edition of The Ray D'Arcy Show live from Vicar Street, presented The Essential Guns N' Roses on 23 November 2008 (her debut on that show) and is credited for her part in the making of Even Better Than the Disco Thing.

== Health ==
Gleeson received successful treatment for Non-Hodgkin lymphoma.
