= Even Better Than the Real Thing Vol. 2 =

Compilation album

Compilation album by Various Artists
- Released: 2004
- Recorded: Dublin, Ireland, 2004
- Genres: Acoustic, pop, cover songs
- Length: 61:00
- Label: RMG Chart Entertainment Ltd.

Even Better Than the Real Thing series chronology
Even Better Than the Real Thing Vol. 1 (2003)	Even Better Than the Real Thing Vol. 2 (2004)	Even Better Than the Real Thing Vol. 3 (2005)

Even Better Than the Real Thing Vol. 2 is an Irish charity album featuring a variety of artists performing acoustic cover versions of popular songs. It was released in 2004 by RMG Chart Entertainment Ltd. Just like volume 1, most of the songs on the album were recorded live and acoustic on The Ray D'Arcy Show on Today FM.

The album was made in aid of the National Children's Hospital in Tallaght & Barretstown.

== Track listing ==
Track no.	Title	Artist	Made famous by
1	"Toxic"	Juliet Turner	Britney Spears
2	"Like I Love You" / "Slow"	Bell X1	Justin Timberlake / Kylie Minogue
3	"Seven Nation Army"	Vyvienne Long	The White Stripes
4	"Everytime"	Glen Hansard & Colm MacConlomaire	Britney Spears
5	"These Words"	The Walls	Natasha Bedingfield
6	"Grandma's Hand" / "No Diggity"	Paddy Casey feat. Dublin Gospel Choir	Blackstreet
7	"Dry Your Eyes"	Brian Kennedy	The Streets
8	"Naughty Girl"	Roesy	Beyoncé Knowles
9	"Saints & Sinners"	Dublin Gospel Choir feat. Paddy Casey	Paddy Casey
10	"I Don't Want You Back"	Mickey Joe Harte	Eamon
11	"Hole in the Head"	Ann & David Blake	Sugababes
12	"Sway"	Bic Runga	Bic Runga
13	"See It In a Boy's Eyes"	Declan O'Rourke & Josh Johnson	Jamelia
14	"Hey Ya!"	The Bogmen	Outkast

== See also ==
- Even Better Than the Real Thing Vol. 1
- Even Better Than the Real Thing Vol. 3
