= Craig Doyle Live =

- Also known as: The Social
- Presented by: Craig Doyle
- Country of origin: Ireland
- No. of seasons: 1

Production
- Production locations: RTÉ Television Centre; Donnybrook, Dublin 4
- Running time: 30 minutes

Original release
- Network: RTÉ Two
- Release: 15 November 2011 – 2012

Related
- The Late Late Show, The Saturday Night Show

Craig Doyle was an Irish weekly topical comedy-style chat show which aired from November 2011 as The Social until 2012, then continued until 2013, and was shown on RTÉ Two. Portrayed as live programme, some episodes were recorded in advance and broadcast at a later date.

== Format as The Social ==
The show was presented by Craig Doyle with guests discussing latest topical news interspersed with news on the latest events on social media such as Twitter and Facebook. It was Doyle's second attempt at a chat show with RTÉ, following 2010's ill-fated Saturday night effort Tonight with Craig Doyle.

"No topic is out of bounds" was the billing before the first episode was broadcast. Doyle and three showbiz guests discussed topics such as soccer-victory-night sex and phone apps that alert men to women's menstrual cycles allowing the male, where applicable, to "steer clear" of the woman or find out "whether she's feeling randy".

The new series failed to attract an audience for RTÉ Two, with both critics and audiences unimpressed. "The Afternoon Show seemed dangerously cutting-edge by comparison", said The Irish Times.

== Format as Craig Doyle ==
Craig Doyle Live took a different approach to the initial format called The Social. The setting moved from his "home" to a more modern looking set. The show aired twice a week, on Tuesdays and Thursdays. Rather than 3 panellists there were 2. A short introduction from Craig Doyle followed by banter with the 2 panel guest. After which a guest was brought on to be interviewed by Craig and his panel. This format was similar to that of The Panel which Craig Doyle also hosted. "Minus The Social's forlorn set, this is the same mixture as before -- unfunny smart-aleck quips from the host and a couple of D-list panellists, and then fawning interviews with celebs whose inordinate lust for the limelight should preclude them from ever having the opportunity to bask in it. " - The Irish Independent

== Transmission history ==
The first episode aired on Tuesday 15 November 2011 as The Social.

RTÉ promised it was to return in 2012. The show was relaunched as Craig Doyle Live on 28 February 2012.

It bounced about the schedule during UEFA Euro 2012, being broadcast after key matches and featuring guests such as Salvatore Schillaci. In November 2012 it was announced the programme would not be returning. Speaking in June 2013 Doyle confirmed that "I won't be appearing on RTE 2 again" after signing a four-year deal with BT Sport.

== Criticism ==
Labour TD Aodhán Ó Ríordáin has criticised the show as being "painful" and "crass laddish nonsense".
