= To the Bright and Shining Sun =

Single by The Walls

from the album New Dawn Breaking
- Released: 11 July 2002
- Recorded: 2002
- Genre: Rock
- Length: ?
- Label: Earshot Records
- Songwriters: Joe Wall, Steve Wall
- Producer: ?

The Walls singles chronology
"3rd "Something's Wrong"" (2000)	"To the Bright and Shining Sun" (2002)	"5th "Drowning Pool"" (2004)

"To the Bright and Shining Sun" is the best known song by Irish rock band The Walls. It was released as a single on 11 July 2002, reaching number 11 in Ireland and receiving a huge amount of airplay that summer. It eventually featured on their second album New Dawn Breaking in 2005.

== History ==
The song started out as an instrumental piece of music with the opening riff being the main feature. That piece of music was used in a major TV and radio ad campaign for AIB in Ireland. Radio stations started calling the band, asking them for the full version with vocals. As this did not exist at the time, the band set about writing and recording a finished version of the song to be released as a single. It went straight to number 11 on the Irish Singles Chart on the week of its release, spending a total of three weeks there.

"To the Bright and Shining Sun" later featured on the EA Sports soundtrack for the UEFA Euro 2004 official licensed game.

"To the Bright and Shining Sun" (2002)
From the 2005 album " New Dawn Breaking".
