= The Essential Series =

- Genre: Discography
- Running time: Sundays; 19:00 - 20:00
- Country of origin: Ireland
- Language(s): English
- Home station: Today FM
- Recording studio: Marconi House, Digges Lane, Dublin 2
- Original release: present
- Audio format: FM and Digital radio
- Website: Official site

The Essential Series is a weekly radio show broadcast on Irish radio station Today FM. Broadcast every Sunday between 19:00 and 20:00, each show is dedicated to a different musician or band and effectively serves as a tribute to their career, with songs from their discography interspersed with commentary from the presenter about the said band or musician. The show has no regular presenter and varies from Tony Fenton to Ann Gleeson, the most recent inductee into the show's list of hosts. She presented a special dedicated to Guns N' Roses on 23 November 2008. Some bands, such as The Beatles and U2, have featured twice. Kate Bush, R.E.M. and Christy Moore are amongst the artists to have been covered by the series in 2008. Other notable shows include Fenton's Aretha Franklin and Matt Cooper's Radiohead.
