= Tonight with Craig Doyle =

- Opening shot from Tonight with Craig Doyle
- Genre: Light entertainment
- Directed by: John F. D. Northover
- Presented by: Craig Doyle
- Starring: Roberta Howett; The Tonight with Craig Doyle House Band
- Country of origin: Ireland
- Original language: English
- No. of seasons: 1
- No. of episodes: 8

Production
- Executive producer: Anne Marie Thorogood
- Producer: Zoë Tait
- Production locations: Studio 4, RTÉ Television Centre, Donnybrook, Dublin 4
- Editor: Michael Crilly
- Camera setup: Multi-camera
- Production company: Waddell Media

Original release
- Network: RTÉ One
- Release: 10 April – 29 May 2010

Related
- The Saturday Night Show (2010); The Saturday Night Show (2010–2015); The Late Late Show (1962–present)

Tonight with Craig Doyle is a talk show hosted by Craig Doyle that was broadcast on RTÉ One for one series in 2010. The show featured guest interviews, audience participation and live music. Tonight with Craig Doyle was broadcast every Saturday night during the spring season directly after the main evening news.

== History ==
=== Replacing Tubridy Tonight ===
Following Pat Kenny's stepping down as host of The Late Late Show in 2009, RTÉ announced that Ryan Tubridy, host of his own Saturday night chat show, would be Kenny's replacement. Tubridy Tonight had aired since 2004 and had regularly drawn an audience of up to half a million since the first series. The departure of Tubridy to the Friday night slot left a gap in the schedule. In late 2009 RTÉ announced that it was to commission a new Saturday night entertainment show that would be fronted by "an established name or a combination of established names". Miriam O'Callaghan and Gerry Ryan, two broadcasters who lost out in the battle to succeed Kenny as host of The Late Late Show, were two names that were mentioned as possible hosts. It was hoped that the show would be "high energy", and would "provide a distinctively Irish take on contemporary entertainment" and proposals for the show's format could include "chat, music, comedy, satire or some other element, such as audience participation, games, etc". It was reported by the Evening Herald that the programme would have a budget of €90,000 per programme while the set for the show cost €100,000, despite being only for an eight-week show and tough company budget cuts.

In a new departure, RTÉ decided to pit two new chat shows against each other. Brendan O'Connor, who moved to RTÉ from The Apprentice: You're Fired! on TV3, would present The Saturday Night Show for an initial run of eight weeks before handing over to Doyle who would present Tonight with Craig Doyle for a further eight weeks. Whichever chat show proved successful would be recommissioned for a further series. Doyle was known to have secured the role even before The Saturday Night Show had aired and wanted the Saturday programme to "complement" the more serious Friday night chat show by being entertaining.

=== Debut ===
Tonight with Craig Doyle made its debut on 10 April 2010 for an initial run of eight programmes. The guests for the first programme were La Toya Jackson, Louis Walsh and actress Victoria Smurfit. Kate Nash was the musical guest, and Jarlath Regan provided stand-up comedy.

=== Ending ===
Following the completion of both The Saturday Night Show and Tonight with Craig Doyle, it was decided to recommission the former for a second series. It proved more popular with the audience than Doyle's show which was panned by the critics and regarded as a flop. Sinead Ryan of the Evening Herald said that Doyle "is the latest contestant in RTÉ's version of The Apprentice", referring to the different presenters changing around in that slot. Doyle went on to present The Social, a midweek nighttime show on RTÉ Two.

== Production ==
Tonight with Craig Doyle was broadcast from Studio 4 in the RTÉ Television Centre at Donnybrook, Dublin 4. That studio is also home to the show's Friday night rival The Late Late Show. As RTÉ's biggest the studio holds 200 audience members. The programme was pre-recorded on the Wednesday before the broadcast. This was primarily because Doyle had other presenting work to do on ITV Sport.

Preceded by Tubridy Tonight	Saturday night programming on Telefís Éireann (versus The Saturday Night Show); 2010	Succeeded by The Saturday Night Show
