= Arthur Murphy (broadcaster) =

Irish television and radio broadcaster (1928–2019)

- Born: 4 June 1928; Dublin, Ireland
- Died: 7 February 2019 (aged 90)
- Education: Honours BA in Modern history and Political Science, Higher Diploma in Education, Master of Arts
- Alma mater: Trinity College Dublin
- Occupation: Broadcaster
- Known for: Mailbag

Arthur Murphy (4 June 1928 – 7 February 2019) was an Irish television and radio broadcaster. He was best known for presenting Mailbag.

== Early life ==
Murphy was born in East Wall, Dublin, the elder of two sons born to Jack and Mary Murphy. He attended Saint Columba's National School by North Strand Church. He entered Trinity College Dublin and completed a four-year honours degree course in Modern history and Political Science graduating in 1949 with a Bachelor of Arts degree, and then the Higher Diploma in Education. He was also a Master of Arts.

== Career ==
=== Abroad ===
In addition to singing, Murphy played piano and church organ. Following graduation from university, he moved to London to pursue a singing career and supported himself with a job as a school master. Hearing about a BBC television series, Music for You, he contacted the office of its presenter, conductor and producer, Eric Robinson who gave him an audition for the chorus, then offered him solo spots in the series. During the series, Murphy performed with Italian opera singer Benamino Gigli and Robert Helpmann.

In 1957, Murphy was given a recording contract by George Martin of Parlophone Records, and Murphy turned to singing big pop ballads. In the same year he married Patricia. In 1960 Murphy went to the US to guest on the Arthur Godfrey show and toured the North America in 1961. During this visit, Murphy guested on Rick Campbell's Better Late Show and on the Elwood Glover show on CBC.

=== Ireland ===
He returned to Dublin when Ireland announced its own state television service. Murphy auditioned for RTÉ television and became presenter of its first chat show, Visitors Book. He also became a producer/director, directing news and producing a weekly music show, Just For You. Oriole Records label offered him a recording contract but changed his name to Mark Dwayne. With this label he had hits with "Remember Me Huh!" and "Little Bitty Heart". To promote these records he performed on ABC Television's Thank Your Lucky Stars in the UK, which was similar to the BBC's Top of the Pops.

=== Abroad ===
Murphy then took up offers from UK television stations Westward Television and Southern Television which covered the south west and south of England, as anchorman on their respective nightly magazine programmes Westward Diary and Day by Day. At Westward he presented with Desmond Wilcox a documentary on the Tolpuddle Martyrs. Once more Murphy moved to Manchester as anchor on BBC's nightly news magazine Look North which then covered the north of England. Before joining Westward, Murphy had guested as a singer on ATV television's series Music Shop with Shirley Bassey.

In the late 1960s, record producer Denis Preston invited him to come up with a concept for an album of Irish songs which resulted in A Nation Once Again, each song representing a period of Irish history. In 1967, President of Ireland Éamon de Valera received Murphy in a half-hour private audience in which he congratulated him for being an unofficial ambassador for his country.

Following a concert appearance with comedian Dave Allen at London's Royal Albert Hall, Murphy starred on BBC television's series Dee Time presented by Simon Dee.

In 1974, he joined Liverpool, Radio City as their first presenter on air with The Breakfast Show. He also hosted programmes like Midday with Murphy and Downtown. He stayed for nearly three years but, with a second son, felt it was more important to spend time with his family.

=== Ireland ===
Back permanently in Dublin he continued presenting and producing sponsored programmes for clients such as Coca-Cola and Johnson Wax as well as presenting programmes for RTÉ's new station, RTÉ Radio 2. Then in 1982 RTÉ offered him a 10-minute weekly filler slot titled Mailbag for 3 weeks. The programme which dealt with viewers letters concerning programmes was extended to 6 weeks. Before the year was out it had become a half-hour show going out on both of RTÉ's television channels. Finally it ended 14 years later. However, Murphy continued to use the Mailbag concept into the 2010s, complete with postmodern ironic touch, with his regular "E-mail Bag" segments on Today FM radio's The Ray D'Arcy Show. In early 2015 Arthur moved with Ray D'Arcy's team to RTÉ and he continued to present the weekly mailbag slot in the afternoon on RTÉ Radio 1.

Murphy lived in Dublin with his wife Patricia up until her death on 2 April 2016. He pursued several interests, including in broadcasting.

== Death ==
Murphy's death was announced by RTÉ News on 8 February 2019, he was 90 years old.
