= Naughty Girl (Beyoncé song) =

2004 single by Beyoncé

Single by Beyoncé

from the album Dangerously in Love
- B-side: "Everything I Do"; "I Know"; "Naïve"
- Released: March 14, 2004
- Studio: South Beach (Miami)
- Genre: R&B
- Length: 3:28
- Label: Columbia; Music World
- Songwriters: Beyoncé Knowles; Scott Storch; Robert Waller; Angela Beyincé; Pete Bellotte; Giorgio Moroder; Donna Summer
- Producers: Beyoncé Knowles; Scott Storch

Beyoncé singles chronology
"Summertime" (2003)	"Naughty Girl" (2004)	"The Closer I Get to You" (2004)

Music video
- "Naughty Girl" on YouTube

"Naughty Girl" is a song by American singer Beyoncé from her debut solo album, Dangerously in Love (2003). It was written by Beyoncé, Scott Storch, Robert Waller and Angela Beyincé, and produced by Storch and Beyoncé. The song was released by Columbia Records as the fourth and final single from the album on March 14, 2004. Musically, "Naughty Girl" is an R&B song that interpolates from Donna Summer's 1975 song "Love to Love You Baby". Influenced by Arabic music, dancehall, funk and reggae, the song contains lyrics that reference to a celebration of sexual lust and conquest, leading up to a desire for a one-night stand.

"Naughty Girl" received positive feedback by music critics, who praised Beyoncé's assertive vocals and the song's sensual vibe. However, opinions about how convincingly Beyoncé was able to portray a naughty girl were polarized. The song was nominated in the category Best R&B/Soul Single by a Female Artist at the 2005 Soul Train Music Awards. "Naughty Girl" peaked at number three on the US Billboard Hot 100 chart, becoming Beyoncé's fourth consecutive release from the album to reach the top-five on that chart. The single reached the top-ten in New Zealand, Australia, the Netherlands and the United Kingdom. "Naughty Girl" was certified gold by the American and Australian trade associations of record producers. It was also certified platinum by the Recording Industry Association of New Zealand.

The song's accompanying music video was directed by Jake Nava and was inspired by the dancing of Cyd Charisse and Fred Astaire in the 1953 musical comedy film The Band Wagon. In it, Beyoncé flirtatiously and seductively dances with R&B singer Usher to portray a naughty girl. The video received four nominations at the 2004 MTV Video Music Awards and eventually won the Best Female Video accolade. The song was included on Beyoncé's set lists on her tours. The American Society of Composers, Authors and Publishers (ASCAP) recognized "Naughty Girl" as one of the most performed songs of 2005 at the ASCAP Pop Music Awards. "Naughty Girl" has been covered by singer-songwriter Roesy and band Richard Cheese and Lounge Against the Machine.

== Background and release ==
After the release of her former group Destiny's Child's 2001 album, Survivor, Beyoncé began a solo career and recorded her debut solo album, Dangerously in Love (2003). Beyoncé stated that it is more personal than her previous records because she was writing for herself. She contacted Scott Storch, Robert Waller and her cousin and personal assistant Angela Beyincé; together, they composed "Naughty Girl" among many other songs. It was planned to be the lead single from the album, but "Crazy in Love" featuring Jay-Z was eventually chosen. "Naughty Girl" was subsequently released as the fourth and final single by Columbia Records; it was serviced for airplay in the US on March 14, 2004.

== Music and lyrics ==
"Naughty Girl"
A sample of "Naughty Girl" which displays Arab music influences and part of the first verse lyrics which demonstrate sexual lust.

"Naughty Girl" is an R&B song written in the key of F♯ minor (in the C♯ Phrygian dominant mode). It is written in common time and moves at a moderate tempo of 100 beats per minute. Beyoncé's vocal range spans around one and a half octaves in the song, from B_{3} to F_{5}. Storch and Beyoncé interpolated the refrain of the 1975 song "Love to Love You Baby", originally performed by Donna Summer and written by Summer, Pete Bellotte and Giorgio Moroder. Musically, "Naughty Girl" is influenced by Arabic music, resulting to an uptempo and disco-oriented sound. The song also displays dancehall as well as reggae influences, and is built on squiggling synth grooves weave.

According to Spence D. of IGN Music, Beyoncé's vocals on the song are layered, making them sound like "a harem of Beyoncé's warbling for the affections of some sultan of swing." According to James Poletti of Yahoo! Music, the female protagonist in the song sings about her "potential to turn on the filth." Lyrically, the song is a celebration of sexual lust and conquest, culminating in a desire for a one-night stand. This "lustful sexual confidence" is further demonstrated in the lyrics of the first verse: "I'm feeling sexy / Wa[nt to] hear you say my name, boy/ If you can reach me, you can feel my burning flame / Feeling kind of N A S T Y / I might just take you home with me" and the chorus lines: " Tonight I'll be your naughty girl / I'm callin' all my girls / We're gonna turn this party out / I know you want my body." Throughout the song, Beyoncé sings the lines "I'd love to love you, baby" almost whispering.

== Critical reception ==
"Naughty Girl" was critically lauded for its sensual vibe. Sal Cinquemani of Slant Magazine wrote that Beyoncé delivers a "convincing impression of Donna Summer". Los Angeles Times' Natalie Nichols wrote that "the deliberately Donna Summer-esque 'Naughty Girl' [...] successfully meld [Beyoncé] breathy cooing with hip, interesting production." Lewis Dene of BBC commented that Beyoncé sings "lustfully and sexually confident", and Spence D. of IGN stated that she creates "a brief aura of aural hypnotism", an effect made during the line "I'm feeling sexy". He also added that the song was guaranteed to have even "the most staid of folks slithering across the dance floor." James Poletti of Yahoo! Music wrote that "Naughty Girl" mingles "Holly Valance Moorish exoticism with a typically tight R&B groove."

Rob Fitzpatrick of NME characterized Beyoncé's breathing heavily while grabbing the "imaginary" bedsheets but remained a "devout young Christian woman singing what the public wants her to sing." Describing "Naughty Girl" as an uptempo party track, Lisa Verrico of The Times commented that the song features "an unusually high-pitched Beyoncé singing lines such as 'The rhythm's got me going crazy'". Neil Drumming of Entertainment Weekly found Beyoncé's singing "not quite convincingly a naughty girl". This was echoed by Kelefa Sanneh of The New York Times who said it was fun to hear Beyoncé mimicking "the pizzicato line" in "Naughty Girl", and that it was not much fun to hear her try to sing "like a naughty girl". Ed Masley of The Arizona Republic commented that "Storch does his most convincing imitation of the Neptunes writing their own 'Kashmir' in a Middle Eastern restaurant".

== Commercial performance ==
"Naughty Girl" propelled the album onto the charts and helped it reach multi-platinum status. "Naughty Girl" debuted at number 68 on the US Billboard Hot 100 issue dated March 27, 2004. After eleven weeks on the chart, "Naughty Girl" received the digital gainer title and peaked at number three on the Billboard Hot 100 issue dated June 5, 2004. It remained at number three for another week and became Beyoncé's fourth consecutive top-five release from Dangerously in Love and Beyoncé's fifth consecutive top-five hit. The single performed equally well on most of Billboard component charts, including Rhythmic Top 40 and Top 40 Tracks. It reached number one on the US Hot R&B/Hip-Hop Singles Sales and the US Hot Dance Music/Club Play charts. The single remained on the chart for twenty-two weeks. "Naughty Girl" single was certified gold by the Recording Industry Association of America (RIAA) on October 22, 2004.

In Oceania, the single peaked at number six in New Zealand on May 31, 2004, while it debuted and peaked at number nine in Australia on May 9, 2004. After tumbling down a few places, it returned to its high point of number nine for four non-consecutive weeks and was certified triple platinum by the Australian Recording Industry Association (ARIA) in 2023 for selling over 210,000 equivalent units. "Naughty Girl" debuted and peaked at number 10 in the United Kingdom on April 17, 2004, making it Beyoncé's third UK top ten single. It charted for eight consecutive weeks in 2004. In Europe, the single reached number ten in the Netherlands, and the top twenty in the Belgian territories of Flanders and Wallonia, Denmark, Germany, France, Norway, Sweden and Switzerland.

== Music video ==
Beyoncé performing a simple dance routine surrounded by a wall of mirrors in the music video for "Naughty Girl".

The music video for "Naughty Girl" was directed by Jake Nava, who directed Beyoncé's videos, "Crazy in Love" and "Baby Boy". The video is inspired by the dancing of Cyd Charisse and Fred Astaire in the 1953 musical comedy film, The Band Wagon and has a Studio 54 style. Paired with Usher, Beyoncé dances seductively and flirts with him to portray a naughty girl. She felt that they were a "perfect match" for the dancing scenes in the video. According to Usher, the video is a homage to classic "ultimate entertainers"; including dancers, singers and actors. He further talked about the collaboration on the video, saying, "Beyoncé and me have been talking about doing a record together. She reached out to me and said she had an idea and really wanted me to be the lead in her video... I was like, 'Well let me hear the idea.' It sounded like something totally different than what had been on TV."

The video begins with Beyoncé performing a simple dance routine surrounded by a wall of mirrors and then undressing until she is naked behind a white curtain, revealing only her silhouette. Beyoncé enters the club with a different outfit and hairstyle and some friends. Male patrons seated at the tables look on. She and Usher notice each other. They meet on the dance floor and dance intimately. Beyoncé performs an elaborate dance scene with female backing dancers. She swirls around in a champagne glass filled with bubbles. In the final scene, Beyoncé sits atop a piano and after being lifted down by a gentleman, she dances and poses as confetti falls everywhere.

Joseph Patel of MTV News described Beyoncé's and Usher's moves in the video as "graceful". Philadelphia's Patrick DeMarco described the video as "sexy". A reviewer from Vibe compared Beyoncé's "booty dance" in the music video to those by Christina Aguilera in the music video for "Dirrty" (2002). On MTV's Total Request Live, "Naughty Girl" debuted at number ten on March 22, 2004, and peaked at number one. It retired to TRL's "Hall of Fame" at number seven and after being on the countdown for fifty days. The video won Best Female Video at the 2004 MTV Video Music Awards and was nominated in the categories Best Choreography, Best Dance Video and Best Cinematography. At the 2005 MTV Australia Video Music Awards, the video received two nominations for Best R&B Video and Sexiest Video.

== Recognition and accolades ==
Bill Lamb writing for About.com ranked the song at number three on his list of the Top 100 Pop Songs 2004, and at number forty-two on his list of the Top 100 Pop Songs of the 2000s, writing: "Beyonce borrowed a portion of Donna Summer's naughty classic 'Love to Love You Baby' to create this celebration of sensual naughtiness." On the occasion of Beyoncé's thirtieth birthday, Erika Ramirez and Jason Lipshutz of Billboard magazine placed "Naughty Girl" at number 12 on their list of Beyoncé's 30 Biggest Billboard Hits. The staff members of Pitchfork placed it at number ten on their list of The Top 50 Tracks of 2004 praising its minimal production which "absolutely burns" and further describing the song as "delicious and practically perfect".

In 2013, John Boone and Jennifer Cady of E! Online placed the song at number eight on their list of Beyoncé's ten best songs, writing "Every now and then Bey likes to get a little funky, like on this reggae-infused dancehall tune that finds our naughty girl cooing Donna Summer-style... Sexiest. Disco. Ever." "Naughty Girl" was nominated in the category Best R&B/Soul Single by a Female Artist at the 2005 Soul Train Music Awards. Beyoncé was awarded the Songwriter of the Year—shared with Scott Storch, Robert Walker, Angela Beyincé, and Donna Summer—at the American Society of Composers, Authors and Publishers' 2005 Pop Music Awards. It also won the Most Performed Songs award, along with "Baby Boy" and "Me, Myself and I". In 2015, Complex named the single one of 15 best songs produced by Scott Storch.

== Live performances ==
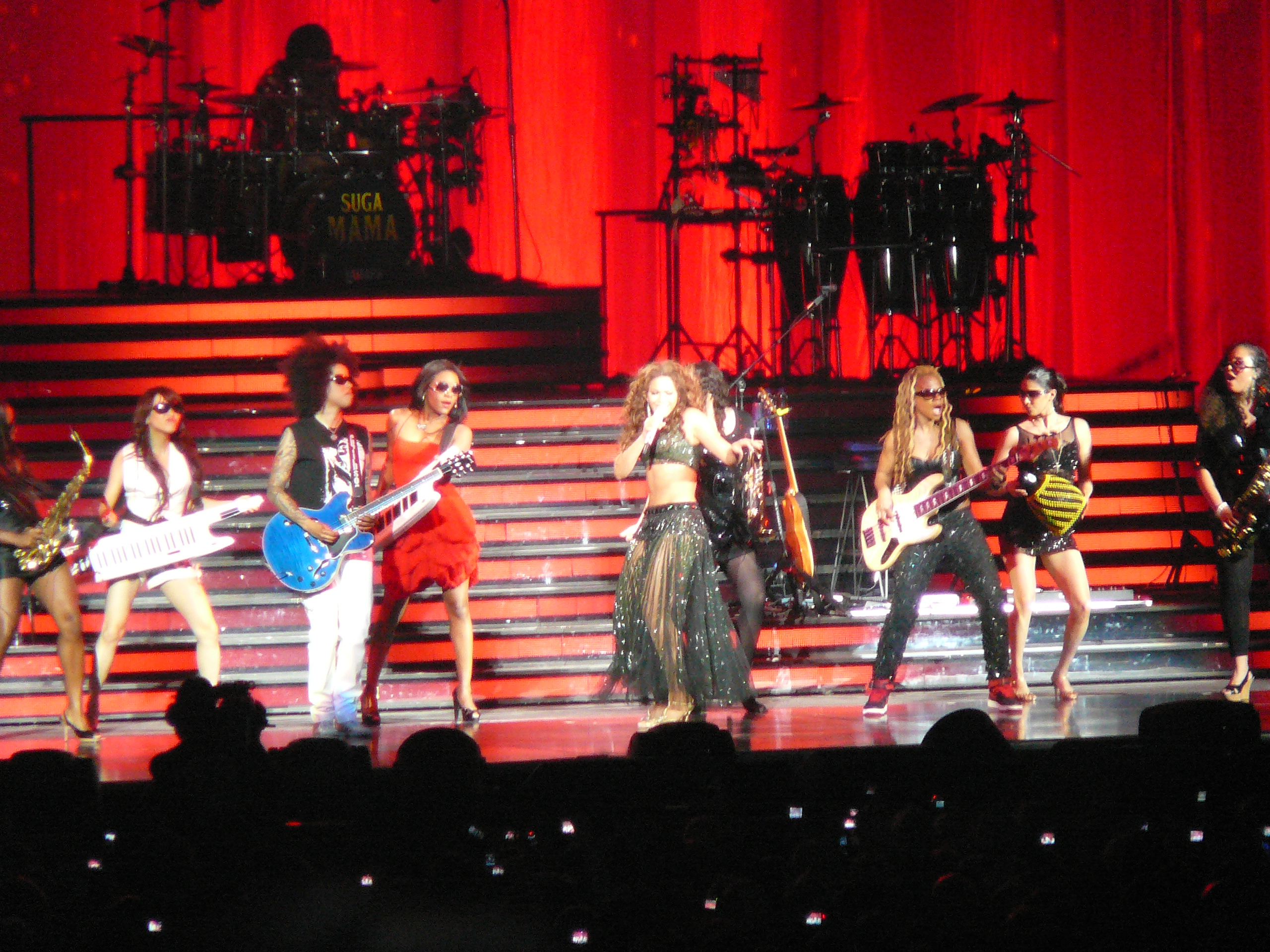
Beyoncé performing "Naughty Girl" on The Beyoncé Experience, with her all-female tour band, Suga Mama.

During the Verizon Ladies First Tour which also featured Alicia Keys, Missy Elliott and Tamia, Beyoncé performed "Naughty Girl" as part of the concert's set list. Before starting to sing, she asked the audience: "Do I have any naughty girls in the house tonight? Her DJ yelled: "Do the A-Town stomp!" Beyoncé then walked onto the stage with some female dancers. As she sang, more dancers appeared on smaller, circular platforms while fire shot from the floor and a long, rectangular screen merged video of flames with images of the performers. Beyoncé then performed portions of Vanity 6's song "Nasty Girl" (1982) as a small dance break. The song was included on the set list of Beyoncé's Dangerously in Love World Tour that began in late 2003. During the tour, she appeared suspended from the ceiling of the arena and was lowered into a red lounger.

The song was included on Beyoncé's set list on her concert tours The Beyoncé Experience (2007) and I Am... World Tour (2009-2010). It was featured on the live albums The Beyoncé Experience Live (2007), and the deluxe edition of I Am... World Tour (2010) which contained performances from the tour. On August 5, 2007, Beyoncé performed the song at the Madison Square Garden in Manhattan. Before starting to sing, she asked loudly for "all the naughty girls present" at the concert to respond, which they did "with enthusiasm". While singing, Beyoncé was accompanied by her all-female band and she incorporated Donna Summer's "Love to Love You Baby" into "Naughty Girl". Jon Pareles of The New York Times complimented the performance, stating: "Beyoncé needs no distractions from her singing, which can be airy or brassy, tearful or vicious, rapid-fire with staccato syllables or sustained in curlicued melismas. But she was in constant motion, strutting in costumes". Shaheem Reid of MTV News also praised the performance, writing: "For all the dancing she did, Beyoncé got an equally big — if not more resounding — response for displaying her undeniable vocal ability". Frank Scheck of The Hollywood Reporter wrote: "The largely uptempo show featured some surprising arrangements that gave the material freshness, such [...] an injection of 'Love to Love You Baby' into 'Naughty Girl'."

In Los Angeles, Beyoncé gave a full-length performance of the song, dressed in a green belly dancing costume. She performed with several female backup dancers and live instrumentation. When Beyoncé performed the song in Sunrise, Florida, on June 29, 2009, she was wearing a glittery gold leotard. As she sang, animated graphics of turntables, faders and other club equipment were projected behind the dancers and musicians. Beyoncé was accompanied by two drummers, two keyboardists, a percussionist, a horn section, three imposing backup vocalists called the Mamas and a lead guitarist, Bibi McGill. Beyoncé performed the song at the Wynn Theatre in Las Vegas, Nevada on August 2, 2009, as part of her show revue I Am... Yours. The performance was recorded and distributed in a DVD/CD package titled I Am... Yours: An Intimate Performance at Wynn Las Vegas.

Beyoncé performed "Naughty Girl" live at her historic headlining Glastonbury Festival Performance on June 26, 2011. In May 2012, Beyoncé performed "Naughty Girl" during her Revel Presents: Beyoncé Live revue at Revel Atlantic City. Before the performance of the song, one of the in-between films was shown, where of Beyoncé said, "Harnessing the power of your body requires responsibility". Then, she appeared dressed in a feathered headdress. During the performance of the song, Beyoncé performed it as a tribute to Donna Summer, singing her song "Love to Love You Baby". Maura Johnston of The Village Voice wrote that "the sinuous 'Naughty Girl' had its source material laid bare at the outset when a sample of the groans and coos from 'Love To Love You Baby' was laid over it". According to Spin's Caryn Ganz, she was "breaking out fluffy feathered fans" during the performance of the song.

In 2014, she performed the song during her co-headlining On the Run Tour with her husband Jay-Z, in a melody with his "Big Pimpin'". The same performance was included on the set list of their second co-headlining tour in 2018, the On the Run II Tour. Beyoncé has also performed the song during her The Mrs. Carter Show (2013-2014) and The Formation (2016) World Tours. In 2023, the song was performed in a mash-up of "Virgo's Groove" from her 2022 album Renaissance during its supporting tour.

== Cover versions and usage in media ==
"Naughty Girl" has been covered by several artists. Irish singer-songwriter Roesy produced a version of the song which appeared on the 2004 charity album Even Better Than the Real Thing Vol. 2. Richard Cheese and Lounge Against the Machine covered the song on their 2006 album Silent Nightclub.

In January 2011, "Naughty Girl" was used in a commercial for L’Oreal Paris Féria hair color in which Beyoncé bleached her hair blonde. Beyoncé wears body-conforming outfits and whips her hair back and forth as she shows off "her luscious locks." "Naughty Girl" was also used in the trailer for the 2004 comedy film Mean Girls, starring Lindsay Lohan. This song appears in the video game Just Dance 2018.

== Track listings and formats ==
- Europe digital EP
1. "Naughty Girl" – 3:28
2. "Naughty Girl" (feat. Lil' Kim) – 3:47
3. "Naughty Girl" (Calderone Quayle club mix) – 9:38
4. "I Know" (Destiny's Child) – 3:32
- Canadian maxi-CD single
1. "Naughty Girl" – 3:30
2. "Naughty Girl" (feat. Lil' Kim) – 3:50
3. "Naughty Girl" (Calderone Quayle Naughty dub) – 7:21
- German maxi-CD single
1. "Naughty Girl" – 3:28
2. "Naughty Girl" (Calderone Quayle club mix edit) – 3:56
3. "Naughty Girl" (feat. Lil' Kim) – 3:47
4. "Naughty Girl" (video) – 3:28
5. "Naughty Girl" (video—live from Headliners) – 3:23
- German CD single
1. "Naughty Girl" – 3:29
2. "Naughty Girl" (Calderone Quayle club mix edit) – 3:56
- German 3-inch Pock It! CD single
1. "Naughty Girl" – 3:30
2. "Naughty Girl" (feat. Lil' Flip) – 4:07
- Australia and New Zealand digital download
1. "Naughty Girl" (feat. Lil' Flip) – 4:07
- UK maxi-CD single
1. "Naughty Girl" – 3:28
2. "Naughty Girl" (feat. Lil' Flip) – 4:07
3. "Naughty Girl" (feat. Lil' Kim) – 3:47
4. "Naïve" (HR Crump Remix feat. Da Brat) – 4:02
5. "Naughty Girl" (video—live from Headliners) – 3:23
- UK and US CD single
1. "Naughty Girl" – 3:28
2. "Everything I Do" (Beyoncé and Bilal) – 4:21
- US 12-inch maxi-single
1. "Naughty Girl" – 3:28
2. "Naughty Girl" (feat. Lil' Kim) – 3:50
3. "Naughty Girl" (feat. Lil' Flip) – 4:07
4. "Naughty Girl" (instrumental) – 3:30
5. "Naughty Girl" (a cappella) – 3:26
6. "Naughty Girl" (feat. Lil' Kim a capella) – 3:48
7. "Naughty Girl" (feat. Lil' Flip a capella) – 4:05

== Charts ==
=== Weekly charts ===
Weekly chart performance for "Naughty Girl"
Chart (2004)	Peak position
Australia (ARIA)	9
Australian Urban (ARIA)	2
Austria (Ö3 Austria Top 40)	29
Belgium (Ultratop 50 Flanders)	14
Belgium (Ultratop 50 Wallonia)	14
Canada (Nielsen SoundScan)	2
Canada CHR/Pop Top 30 (Radio & Records)	1
Denmark (Tracklisten)	15
France (SNEP)	18
Germany (GfK)	16
Greece (IFPI)	11
Hungary (Dance Top 40)	13
Ireland (IRMA)	14
Italy (FIMI)	23
Netherlands (Dutch Top 40)	10
Netherlands (Single Top 100)	14
New Zealand (Recorded Music NZ)	6
Norway (VG-lista)	14
Romania (Romanian Top 100)	100
Scottish Singles Sales (Official Charts)	15
Spain (Promusicae)	19
Sweden (Sverigetopplistan)	32
Switzerland (Schweizer Hitparade)	18
UK Singles (Official Charts)	10
UK Hip Hop/R&B (Official Charts)	3
US Billboard Hot 100	3
US Dance Club Songs (Billboard) DMS12 remix	1
US Dance Airplay (Billboard)	1
US Hot R&B/Hip-Hop Songs (Billboard)	8
US Pop Airplay (Billboard)	2
US Rhythmic Airplay (Billboard)	1

=== Year-end charts ===
Year-end chart performance for "Naughty Girl"
Chart (2004)	Position
Australia (ARIA)	59
Australia Urban (ARIA)	24
Belgium (Ultratop 50 Flanders)	70
Belgium (Ultratop 50 Wallonia)	91
Netherlands (Dutch Top 40)	73
UK Singles (OCC)	154
US Billboard Hot 100	18
US Dance Club Play (Billboard)	10
US Dance Radio Airplay (Billboard)	15
US Hot R&B/Hip-Hop Singles & Tracks (Billboard)	46
US Mainstream Top 40 (Billboard)	14
US Rhythmic Top 40 (Billboard)	16
US Top 40 Tracks (Billboard)	11

== Certifications ==
Certifications and sales for "Naughty Girl"
Region	Certification	Certified units/sales
Australia (ARIA)	3× Platinum	210,000^{‡}
Brazil (Pro-Música Brasil)	Gold	30,000^{‡}
Canada (Music Canada)	Platinum	80,000^{‡}
New Zealand (RMNZ)	Platinum	30,000^{‡}
United Kingdom (BPI)	Platinum	600,000^{‡}
United States (RIAA)	2× Platinum	2,000,000^{‡}
^{‡} Sales+streaming figures based on certification alone.

== Release history ==
Release dates and formats for "Naughty Girl"
Region	Date	Format(s)	Label(s)	Ref.
United States	March 14, 2004	Rhythmic contemporary radio; urban contemporary radio	Columbia	
United Kingdom	April 5, 2004	Maxi CD	Columbia	
Denmark	April 19, 2004	Maxi CD	Sony Music	
United States	April 20, 2004	12-inch vinyl	Columbia	
Australia	April 23, 2004	Digital download (EP); maxi CD	Sony Music	
Germany	April 26, 2004	CD; digital download; maxi CD	Sony Music	
France	May 3, 2004	CD	Columbia	
United States	May 18, 2004	CD; digital download	Columbia	
United States	June 1, 2004	Digital download (Remix)	Columbia	
