= Quentin Fottrell =

Irish journalist

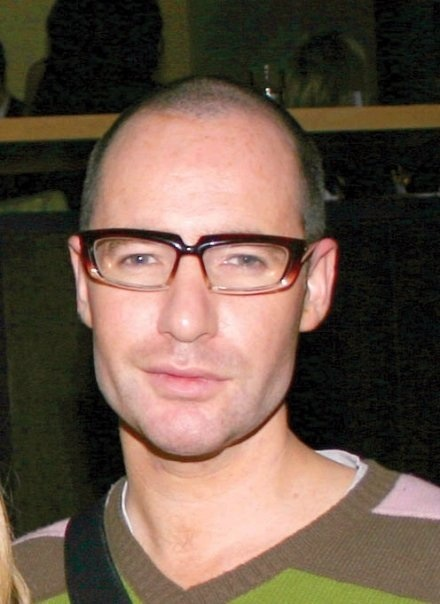
- Quentin Fottrell at the Morrison Hotel, Dublin, Ireland, 2010
- Born: Dublin, Ireland
- Occupations: Journalist, author

Quentin Fottrell is an Irish columnist, author, agony uncle, journalist, social diarist, and critic.

== Early life and education ==
Fottrell was born in Dublin, and studied psychology in University College Dublin, and journalism in University College Galway.

== Career ==
Fottrell was the Irish correspondent for Dow Jones Newswires and The Wall Street Journal from 2003 to 2011, columnist and feature writer for The Irish Times, and as of this date, was working as a journalist in New York City.

As of 2020, Fottrell was "run[ing] The Moneyist, an advice column on the finance media site MarketWatch". He writes about spending and investing, and in the advice column, he answers questions on inheritance, marriage, divorce, relationships, weddings and other financial issues related to ethics and etiquette.

=== Specific journalistic thrusts ===
Fottrell reported aspects of Irish life related to the rise of Ireland as the Celtic Tiger, and on the expansion of the European Union during Ireland's six-month EU presidency.

=== Other writing ===
Fottrell has contributed to magazines and newspapers in the U.S., U.K., and Ireland, including Town & Country, The Sunday Times, The Dubliner, gave advice on relationships on The Ray D'Arcy Show, and wrote a weekly radio review column for The Irish Times.

He has also published in book length works, including one on relationships in Ireland, titled "Love in a Damp Climate," and contributed to several others, including "A Pint and a Haircut," a collection of true Irish stories.

== LGBT writer and activist ==
Fottrell is openly gay and an advocate of equality for LGBT people. As an activist for LGBT rights, Fottrell advocated for marriage equality in a series of columns for Irish newspapers in the run-up to the Irish civil partnership and marriage equality campaigns. In 2007, he wrote, "Gay marriage doesn't damage children. But not allowing it does. It fosters a culture of prejudice, and infects the aspirations of gay children. It's not healthy for our gay children to see a future in which their role in society is restricted." Fottrell also wrote about homophobia in rural Ireland and the struggles of gay people to live openly and free of prejudice in small towns.

Fottrell organized a "Vote Yes for Equality" campaign in New York in the weeks leading up to the marriage equality referendum in Ireland in May 2015. He subsequently reported on the impact of the referendum for The Wall Street Journal and interviewed Irish diaspora who returned to Ireland for the vote. After Ireland became the first country in the world to put this issue to a public vote, Fottrell wrote, "On May 22, Ireland sent a message to the world: If we can do it, you can too."

Since moving to New York, he has reported on the experiences of Irish emigrants and reflected, in particular, on how that relates to growing up gay in Catholic Ireland: "It's tempting to romanticize the past. Migrant memories, especially post-Celtic Tiger, can be selective and stylized like a TV commercial." He said generations of people left Ireland for cultural reasons as well as economic ones. "Leaving everything behind is not easy," he wrote, "but I needed to break new ground, and it would be an adventure: Where else to go but the land of Harvey Milk and money."
