= Even Better Than the Real Thing Vol. 1 =

Compilation album by Various Artists
- Released: 2003
- Recorded: Dublin, Ireland, 2003
- Genre: Acoustic, pop, cover songs
- Length: 53:12
- Label: RMG Chart Entertainment Ltd.

Even Better Than the Real Thing series chronology
Even Better Than the Real Thing Vol. 1 (2003)	Even Better Than the Real Thing Vol. 2 (2004)

Even Better Than the Real Thing Vol. 1 is an Irish charity album featuring a variety of artists performing acoustic cover versions of popular songs. It was released in November 2003, by RMG Chart Entertainment Ltd. The songs on the album were recorded live and acoustic on The Ray D'Arcy Show on Today FM.

The album was made in aid of the National Children's Hospital in Tallaght. The album's name is a reference to U2's song, "Even Better Than the Real Thing".

== Track listing ==
Track no.	Title	Cover Artist	Original Artist
1	"Can't Get You Out of My Head"	Jack L	Kylie Minogue
2	"Get the Party Started"	Damien Rice & Lisa Hannigan	Pink
3	"Sweet Dreams My L.A. Ex"	Picturehouse	Rachel Stevens
4	"Underneath Your Clothes"	Kieran Goss	Shakira
5	"Crazy in Love"	Mickey Harte	Beyoncé
6	"Ain't Nobody"	The Walls	Chaka Khan
7	"How You Remind Me"	Maria Doyle Kennedy	Nickelback
8	"Sound of the Underground"	The 4 of Us	Girls Aloud
9	"Breathe"	Roesy	Blu Cantrell
10	"Wherever, Whenever"	Mundy	Shakira
11	"Cry Me a River"	Glen Hansard	Justin Timberlake
12	"I Believe in a Thing Called Love"	Damien Dempsey	The Darkness
13	"Escape"^{*}	Kevin Doyle (AKA Elvis)	Enrique Iglesias

^{*}Also features a hidden track of Picturehouse covering "Papa Don't Preach" by Madonna.
