= The Ray D'Arcy Show =

Irish radio programme

- Genre: Chat/music
- Running time: 09:00 – 12:00 (until 2014); 15:00 - 16:30 (2015–2025)
- Country of origin: Ireland
- Language: English
- Home station: Today FM (until 2014); RTÉ Radio 1 (2015–2025)
- Audio format: FM and Digital radio
- Website: www.rte.ie/radio1/ray

The Ray D'Arcy Show is the title given to two differing versions of a radio programme hosted by Ray D'Arcy, originally broadcast on Irish commercial radio station Today FM from the late 1990s until 2014 before transferring in February 2015 to the country's national public service broadcaster Raidió Teilifís Éireann-owned radio station RTÉ Radio 1. The show was broadcast each weekday afternoon (originally broadcasting from 9:00am–12:00 midday between the late 1990s and 2014).

The original mid-morning radio show competed with RTÉ 2fm's Gerry Ryan (and his successor Ryan Tubridy), RTÉ Radio 1's Pat Kenny (and his successor Sean O'Rourke) and Newstalk's Tom Dunne^{a} (and his successor Pat Kenny). During the 2000s, D'Arcy won three consecutive "Best National DJ" Meteor Awards while presenting that incarnation of the show. The production team of Jenny Kelly, Will Hanafin and Mairead Farrell featured prominently, with Kelly known for her weekly Fix-it Friday slot and Farrell for her daily "Odd-One-Out Quiz". Other contributors to The Ray D'Arcy Show (morning edition) included Maeve Higgins, Quentin Fottrell, Conor Pope, Pixie McKenna and Arthur Murphy.

D'Arcy announced his departure from Today FM in December 2014 with his vacant position subsequently being filled albeit temporarily by Alison Curtis and then on a permanent basis by Anton Savage; D'Arcy's Radio 1 debut came on 2 February 2015. After rejoining RTÉ, D'Arcy was given his own Saturday night chat show, also called The Ray D'Arcy Show.

On 9 October 2025, RTÉ announced that the programme was no longer "part of our future plans", and D'Arcy's departure from the station. D'Arcy's final broadcast of The Ray D'Arcy Show took place the previous day.

== History ==
=== 1990s-2014 ===
In the late 1990s, D'Arcy transferred to Today FM. There he took over the mid-morning show from Tim Kelly which went out from 10:00 to 12:45. This slot was later changed to 9:00 to 12:00, entering direct competition with RTÉ 2fm's The Gerry Ryan Show. The Ray D'Arcy Show is responsible for launching the professional career of the comedian Maeve Higgins, who auditioned for a nationwide competition organised by the show in February 2004.

Guests during the show's heyday included Will Ferrell, John C. Reilly, Colin Farrell, Brendan Gleeson, Myleene Klass, Dylan Moran, Trinny and Susannah Dermot O'Leary, Anne Doyle and Miriam O'Callaghan.

D'Arcy and his production team of Jenny Kelly, Mairéad Farrell and Will Hanafin once performed a spoof version of the OK Go hit "Here It Goes Again" in D'Arcy's back garden in frozen conditions. In 2007, the show featured a petition for Amhrán na bhFiann to be sung after Ireland's Call in the 2007 Rugby World Cup.

In 2008, D'Arcy stripped naked to participate in a Spencer Tunick art project and later spoke of it on the air.

Later, live on his radio show, he criticised Orla McAdam of The Apprentice, a former follower of D'Arcy in his days with children's television, and upset her.

On the week of 24–28 November 2008 a Dublin caller named Huberta explained she had located someone else's shopping in the boot of her car. It includes some meat (which she has since refrigerated), some bottles of wine and some Mexican sauce. D'Arcy spent the week following her attempts to track down the mystery owner, with dramatic daily updates that involved the scanning of Tesco customer records and the hiring of a private detective. The mystery is still ongoing.

In 2008, Russell Brand, alongside his co-host Matt Morgan alleged that Ray D'Arcy had stolen items, guests and jokes from The Russell Brand Show. Appearing on the show as a guest, Darcy disputed this although noted that fans of both shows noticed similarities.

The show embarked on a Discover Ireland Feel Good tour of the country in early 2009.

In February 2009, D'Arcy interviewed the British game show host Chris Tarrant of Who Wants to Be a Millionaire? through a phoneline, in an incident which later gained media attention. Overhearing the show's team criticising the England national rugby union team beforehand, Tarrant opened the interview by saying: "There's something very depressing about sitting here listening to you talk about how rubbish the English team is."

Tarrant was then asked what he thought of the multiple Academy Award-winning film Slumdog Millionaire which mimics his game show. Tarrant responded by saying: "I can't relate to it. He's a sleazy host with an earring. The game show is the cornerstone to my life and I just can't relate to the movie." Tarrant then attempted to promote his new show The Colour of Money.

D'Arcy asked him to explain the format of the show, saying: "The key to a good format is you can explain it in one or two sentences. Like Who Wants To Be A Millionaire? is, in effect, 'you answer 15 questions and you win a million'. That's it. So, with The Colour of Money can you do that?" Tarrant replied with: "The Colour of Money. . . . .there are 20 cash machines, all with different amounts in them ranging up to a total of more than £25,000. You choose 10 colours and they have different amounts in them. If all 10 add up to the total of money you want, then you win. If the money is not enough, then you lose out and there's no in between. It's either £80,000 or £90,000 or whatever, or you go home with el zippo." D'Arcy responded to this failure to keep to his limits by laughing and saying: "That is a real test of the format!"

On the weekend of 21–22 March 2009, a then unidentified person placed nude portraits of the Taoiseach in the National Gallery of Ireland and the gallery of the Royal Hibernian Academy. The artist anonymously emailed the show, claiming responsibility for the creation of the paintings, but not their hanging. Gardaí subsequently raided the Today FM studios and producer Will Hanafin was asked to hand over the emails claiming that the placing of the paintings constituted indecency, incitement and criminal damage. Hanafin declined to provide the emails without a warrant.

An interview conducted with British chef Gordon Ramsay by Ryan Tubridy on The Late Late Show in late 2009 led to comment in the Irish media when Ramsay engaged in personal criticism of Tubridy over his appearance. Ramsay compared Tubridy's ears to Dumbo, saying: "Look at those things, you must take off coming down the stairs. I'm surprised you can get through the door". The chef also spoke of his desire to bring Tubridy to one of his restaurants, commenting "You look like you haven't eaten in years. You're too thin. You're like a little windy piece of asparagus". The Evening Herald said Tubridy had been "ridiculed and humiliated [...] in front of a squirming television audience".

A spokesperson for Tubridy said he understood the comments as a joke. While appearing on The Ray D'Arcy Show to promote The Late Late Toy Show some weeks later, Tubridy responded to the incident: "I thought he was a bit, em, British for my liking. I won’t be buying the books [Ramsay was promoting]. In fact, I didn't take the free one".

Sharon Corr and Joe Echo performed a duet of "Fairytale of New York" on the show in December 2009.

After musician Jim Corr appeared on the first episode of The Saturday Night Show in 2010, D'Arcy said it was "irresponsible" for Corr to have discussed his views on the 2009 flu pandemic. Corr rang the radio show and the two engaged in what the Dundalk Democrat's Gary McLaughlin described as "the mother of all radio battles", with D'Arcy at one point saying "I think we need to get down to this level with you" over the possibility of the government purposefully providing dangerous vaccines and Corr saying D'Arcy was "very patronising" and urging him, "Just be careful not to misquote me in the future".

In 2010, Mairead Farrell said she would never leave the show.

In 2011, D'Arcy wept on air while reading an email from Nuala Doyle, whose son Carl developed luekaemia and died aged 16.

On 8 April 2011, Jenny's father, Michael, died in his sleep. Jenny learned of the death from Today FM chief executive Willie O'Reilly while on air. The Ray D'Arcy Show was abruptly taken off the air, prompting thousands of texts and calls from worried listeners. Ray and Jenny were scheduled to lead 800 people on a run in Ringsend as part of the Run With Ray campaign, but athlete Sonia O'Sullivan replaced them when tragedy struck. Today FM breakfast show host Ian Dempsey took over the airwaves immediately.

In July 2014, D'Arcy incurred the wrath of mixed martial arts fans by inviting Cathal Pendred onto his show then grilling him on his part in the "violent and disturbing" sport.

The Den radio reunion

On 14 November 2008, a special edition of The Ray D'Arcy Show was broadcast live from Vicar Street, Dublin. It reflected on the formative years of The Den (formerly presented by D'Arcy who himself had succeeded Today FM breakfast host, Ian Dempsey) from 1986 to 1994 in front of a live audience who shared their memories.

Listeners were also invited to contribute, after which D'Arcy would dip into his O'Byrne's World of Wonder sack which contained toy prizes. The show was even video-streamed live online. D'Arcy was not the only original member of the team present; Zig and Zag featured heavily as they were promoting their new DVD Best Bitz From Back Den, Don Conroy put in an appearance to instruct D'Arcy how to draw a barn owl, Ian Dempsey turned up later (he had been presenting his breakfast show from the Today FM studios directly beforehand), a 4 ft Ted attacked D'Arcy at 10:10 as Zig and Zag cheered him on with the audience, and, to Zig and Zag's disgust, Dustin made a cameo appearance toward the end.

The show opened with D'Arcy counting down the Top 5 Theme Tunes from programmes broadcast on The Den. He revealed that #3 (The Littlest Hobo) was purchased by RTÉ in Cannes as part of a buy-one-get-one-free deal and was given to The Den to broadcast - such deals were typical of The Den's budget.

#	Theme
5	Dastardly and Muttley
4	Bosco
3	The Littlest Hobo
2	Mighty Mouse
1	Teenage Mutant Hero Turtles/ Captain Planet

There were reminders of Don Conroy's special hugs, D'Arcy's walking upon invisible stairs and "Ray's Rave" where children sent their parents from the room, turned off the lights, pulled the curtains and raved. A repeat of this was carried out at 11:45. There were catch-ups with old members of the team such as Ciara Carroll, who is now a PA for Dublin Airport.

D'Arcy played music from these years throughout the show, beginning with Europe's "The Final Countdown" from 1986. There were also live performances from Irish musicians, accompanied by Ronan Johnson and the Boogie Woogie Band, who had appeared on The Den. Steve and Joe Wall performed "Brewing Up a Storm" from their years with The Stunning (they claimed beforehand to have been high on magic mushrooms on The Den) Cadbury's gorilla, Johnny Donnelly from The Saw Doctors appeared to remind of their ten-plus appearances and invited D'Arcy to run the Dublin Marathon. Liam Ó Maonlaí performed "Don't Go", whilst Jerry Fish performed "Celebrate" to close the show.

== Regular features ==
Emailbag

A reference to Arthur Murphy's Mailbag, Murphy read out emails from the listeners on a weekly basis.

Fix-it Friday

This, as is evident by the name, took place each Friday, with D'Arcy and his assistant Jenny Kelly trying to find the solution to any question the listenership requested of them.

Odd-One-Out Quiz

The "Odd-One-Out Quiz" took place on the half-hour of every hour every day the show was on the air, i.e. three times per day and fifteen times per week. D'Arcy asked a phone-in contestant a series of questions over thirty seconds, each involving three items, one of which would be the odd one out. A regular example would be two consonants and a vowel. The fast-paced delivery was usually enough to unhinge the contestant, although D'Arcy was usually generous in his delivery and would often repeat questions after the allotted time had passed. Listeners were asked to enter if they fitted a specific and topical theme which changed daily, i.e. owning an interesting pet, being members of the hairless population, or shoppers who have had an accident in the supermarket.

What Would Maeve Do...

Each Tuesday Maeve Higgins answered questions and dilemmas sent in by listeners.

No Agony! No Aunt!

Quentin Fottrell advised listeners about personal relationships on Wednesdays at 10.40am.

Even Better Than...

Each year, for some time, the show released a charity album containing covers performed by Irish musicians on the show. The latest was titled Even Better Than the Disco Thing and was released in December 2008. The name comes from the U2 song, "Even Better Than the Real Thing", and the early compilations were named thus.

Shave Or Dye

D'Arcy played a prominent role in Today FM's Shave Or Dye Campaign. The Ray D'Arcy Show featured in the Guinness Book of Records after it broke the world record for most heads shaved in an hour by a team of 10 barbers, total heads shaved 315.

== Ratings ==
In 2008, The Ray D'Arcy Show had 245,000 listeners, a decrease of 9,000 from the previous year. However, D'Arcy started stealing listeners from Tubridy since the unexpected death of Gerry Ryan in 2010, and in February 2011 he dislodged Ryan Tubridy as Ireland's "King of the Mid-Morning Airwaves". JNLR figures in early 2011 put him at 3,000 more listeners than RTÉ, a first for a Today FM show.

== Awards ==
In 2005, 2006 and 2007 Ray won the Best Irish Radio DJ award at the Meteor Music Awards, cementing his position as one of Ireland's most popular radio presenters. D'Arcy always maintains that this should be seen as a group award, and that credit should be shared with Jenny Kelly, Mairead Farrell and producer Will Hanafin, who also contributes to presenting the show. Despite this, it was only ever awarded to himself so he can claim the credit here. In 2008 D'Arcy was beaten by his namesake Ray Foley who launched a daily campaign to dethrone him.

In 2006, The Ray D'Arcy Show won the Community/Social Action award at the PPI Irish Radio Awards for their work on highlighting road safety problems and deaths on the roads in Ireland. This was due in part, to their "Don't be a Fucking Eejit" radio adverts, which contained real-life stories.

In 2007, The Ray D'Arcy Show won the Best Light Entertainment Programme award at the PPI Irish Radio Awards.

Year	Nominee / work	Award	Result
2005	Ray D'Arcy	Best Irish DJ at the Meteor Awards	Won
2006	Ray D'Arcy	Best Irish DJ at the Meteor Awards	Won
2006	The Ray D'Arcy Show	Community/Social Action award at the PPI Irish Radio Awards	Won
2007	Ray D'Arcy	Best Irish DJ at the Meteor Awards	Won
2007	The Ray D'Arcy Show	Best Light Entertainment Programme award at the PPI Irish Radio Awards	Won
2008	Ray D'Arcy	Best Irish DJ at the Meteor Awards	Nominated

== Footnotes ==
- ^a Dunne was a former colleague who sometimes filled in for him on The Ray D'Arcy Show

== Sources ==
- O'Reilly, Brian (4 December 2012). "Today FM's Ray D'Arcy and Mairead Farrell pay tribute to Homeland in new video". Independent.ie. Archived from the original on 7 December 2012.
