= Bertiespeak =

English as spoken by Bertie Ahern

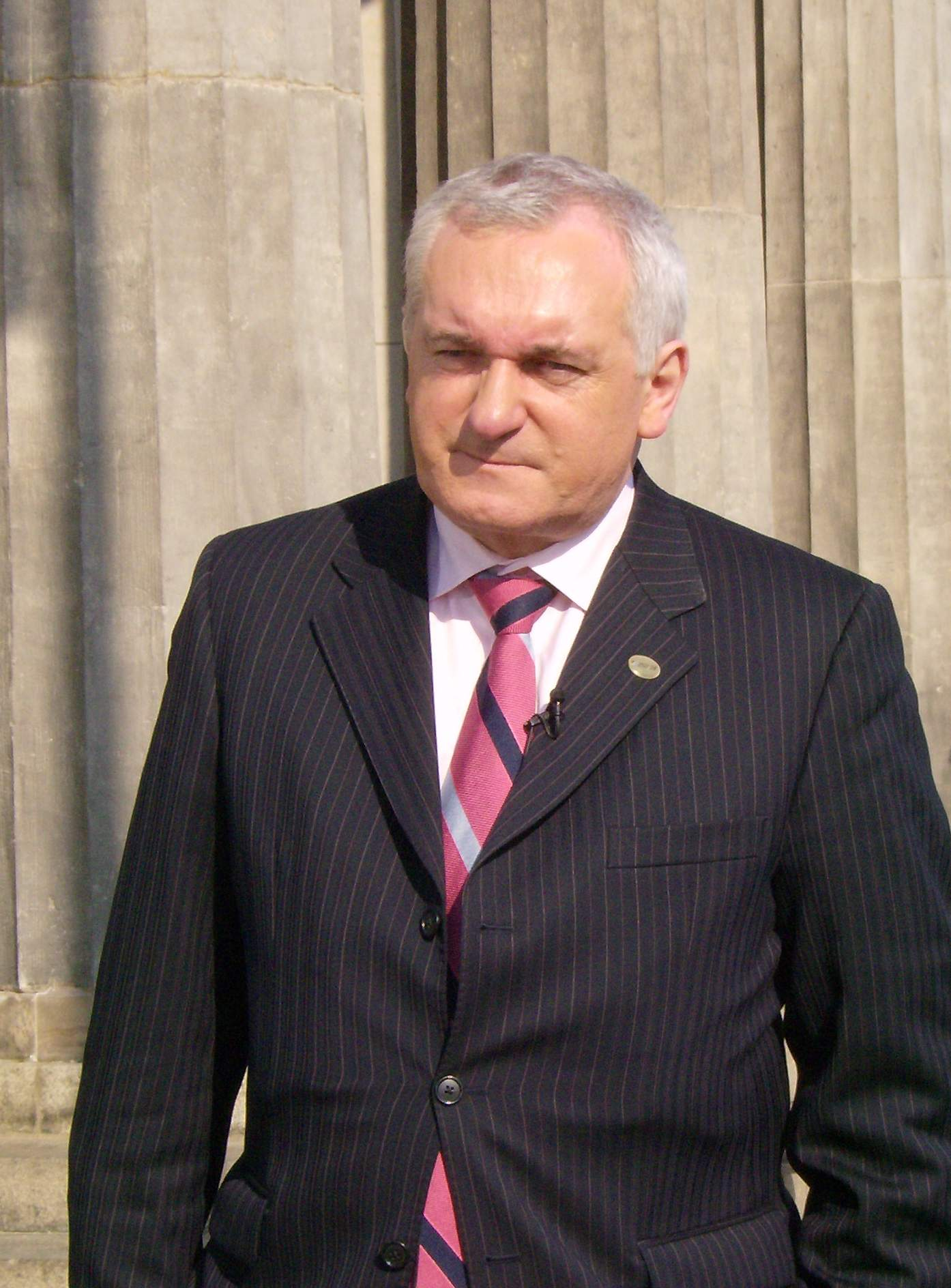
Bertiespeak is spoken by Bertie Ahern, seen here in Berlin in May 2007

Bertiespeak or Bertie-speak is a way of speaking the English language as spoken by former Irish Taoiseach Bertie Ahern.

Ahern's use of Bertiespeak has been credited as playing an integral part in the Northern Ireland peace process and former Prime Minister of the United Kingdom Tony Blair was noted on at least one occasion to have allowed Ahern to use Bertiespeak when confronted with a tricky question posed by a journalist. On another occasion when Unionists on a visit to Government Buildings in Dublin made a complaint Ahern was said to have "drowned" them "in a torrent of Bertie-speak", according to Deaglán De Bréadún.

References to Bertiespeak appeared regularly in the Irish media during Ahern's administration. Will Hanafin's De Little Book of Bertie, published in 2001, features numerous examples of Bertiespeak.

== Description ==
Bertiespeak has been described by witnesses as being constructed of sentences which are "coherent and logical" when taken individually but are "calculated to bemuse and mystify" when said consecutively, with one observer remarking: "You would want to be Einstein to understand it". Pat Leahy, writing in The Sunday Business Post in 2002, suggested in relation to Ahern's speech, "one is seldom in doubt about what he means, but there is sometimes confusion over just what he is actually saying" before citing one example from a press conference during which Ahern said "neutrality is not and never has been anything but absolutely clear".

The Sunday Times book reviewer Edward King described Bertiespeak as being "characterised by a combination of malapropisms, grammatical infelicities and general confusion" and said the following was the most famous example of Bertiespeak:

It took Ireland 30 years to become an overnight success.

== Examples of use ==
One example of Bertie-speak noticed by the Irish media (Sunday Tribune) occurred in 2003 while Ahern was addressing Dáil Éireann and referred to "the road map", the European Union's Middle East peace plan, as "the road crash" on several occasions.

Another famous example is his call for people not to "upset the apple tart".

Political opponents too have recognised Bertiespeak. Then Labour Party TD Derek McDowell, speaking at the Select Committee on Finance and the Public Service on 19 April 2000, is recorded as having registered his confusion at some of Ahern's points:

On occasion the Taoiseach has been criticised for using something called "Bertie speak" and speaking in a language which can mean many things to many people. Reading the section on multimedia developments, and listening to the Taoiseach, I wonder whether we are speaking the same language at all. I have not got the remotest idea what this means and what this multimedia village is supposed to be. Is this a real cluster of industries or a cyberspace notion? What is it? What does it do? Who is involved in it? How are we funding it? What is this money being spent on? What is the digital economy? Are we talking about broadcasting? It is one of those things perhaps one should not admit to not understanding. This paragraph is beyond me. If the Taoiseach can shed any light on it, I will be happy to hear what he has to say. It seems to involve a fair measure of funding.

Speaking of media opposition to his Stadium Ireland proposal in 2002, Ahern complained: "I'll not have it whinged to death in the press".

== Book ==
De Little Book of Bertie, written by Will Hanafin and published by Merlin Publishing in October 2001, was the first book dedicated to Bertiespeak. As part of his research Hanafin browsed newspapers and watched television programmes which featured Ahern.

Hanafin's personal favourite is: "People should stop throwing white elephants and red herrings at each other".

== See also ==
- Bushism
