= Even Better Than the Real Thing album series =

Irish charity albums

Even Better Than the Real Thing is the title of a number of Irish charity albums recorded on The Ray D'Arcy Show on Today FM and released over a number of years for the Irish Christmas market. The albums featured Irish artists performing covers of various pop songs until 2005 when the series was temporarily discontinued, although in 2008 Even Better Than the Disco Thing was released featuring covers of disco songs instead. The title is taken from the U2 song "Even Better Than the Real Thing".

== Albums ==
Below are the albums released so far.

- Even Better Than the Real Thing Vol. 1 (2003)
- Even Better Than the Real Thing Vol. 2 (2004)
- Even Better Than the Real Thing Vol. 3 (2005)
- Even Better Than the Disco Thing (2008)
