= The Walls =

Irish rock band

- Origin: Ireland
- Genres: Rock
- Years active: 1998–present
- Labels: Dirtbird Records Previously - Columbia Records, Second Motion.
- Spinoff of: The Stunning
- Members: Joe Wall; Steve Wall; Jon O'Connell; Rory Doyle
- Past members: Carl Harms
- Website: Official website

The Walls are an Irish rock band. They were formed in 1998 by two members of The Stunning – brothers Steve and Joe Wall. Their debut album Hi-Lo was released in 2000 and included the singles "Bone Deep", "Something's Wrong" and "Some Kind of a Girl". The Walls supported U2 at their second show in Slane Castle in 2001. A number of songs from Hi-Lo featured in movies: Goldfish Memory, On the Edge, and Dead Bodies. In 2002 they released the single "To the Bright and Shining Sun", which was used on an Irish TV commercial and reached number 11 in the Irish Singles Chart. The subsequent album New Dawn Breaking (2005) included "To the Bright and Shining Sun" and three other singles: "Drowning Pool", "Passing Through" and "Black and Blue". The 2013 movie Begin Again starring Keira Knightley and Mark Ruffalo features "Drowning Pool" over the opening credits. The first track on the album "Open Road" proved a favourite with Nic Harcourt on his KCRW show Morning Becomes Eclectic and he invited the band to play a session on the show in 2006. They played SXSW in Austin, Texas, a few days beforehand. The following year the band travelled to Australia and played their first shows there, opening up for Crowded House on the latter's first reunion gigs. The Walls opened the shows in Sydney and Melbourne and also performed their own gigs in both of those cities. The band's third album Stop the Lights was released in 2012. In March 2013, the band played their first shows in Russia and performed live on the Evening Urgant show. They returned the following year.

In 2014 the band decided to take a break to concentrate on other projects, but did not break up. Drummer Rory Doyle recorded and toured with Irish band Bell X1 and also Hozier with whom he appeared on the 2015 Grammy Awards. Steve developed a new career as an actor, appearing in the History channel series Vikings and in Chris O'Dowd's Moone Boy, amongst others, including Silent Witness and Crossing Lines.

== History ==
=== 1998–2004; Hi-Lo ===
Hi-Lo

Studio album by The Walls
- Released: May 2000
- Genres: Rock; Indie rock
- Length: 58:22
- Label: Dirtbird Records

The Walls chronology
''Hi-Lo'' (2000)	New Dawn Breaking (2005)

Brothers Steve and Joe Wall (previously of The Stunning) returned to Ireland after a two-year failed label stint in London. Their Camden housemate Carl Harms joined the band on guitar and keyboard duties. Drummer Rory Doyle joined soon afterwards. They set up their own label, Earshot Records (later changing it to Dirtbird Records) and recorded and released a string of singles. A remix of one of the album tracks, "Bone Deep", became a nationwide hit. Many of the songs have featured on a number of TV series and feature films such as Bachelors Walk, Dead Bodies, Goldfish Memory and On the Edge (starring Cillian Murphy). Their debut album Hi-Lo was released in May 2000.

The Walls heard rumour of a second Slane Castle date for U2 in 2001 (as the first concert had sold out in hours). They sent four copies of their album to the band. Bono loved it and offered The Walls a support slot. That day the band played to their biggest crowd to date, around 80,000 people. "To the Bright and Shining Sun" was their next single. That June they supported Red Hot Chili Peppers. They spent the next year gigging while building their own studio in Dublin.

In February 2004, original member Carl Harms decided to leave the band to make his own record. They recruited bassist Jon O'Connell, who had two weeks to learn all the songs before a two-week tour of the new European Union accession states: Poland, Hungary, Slovakia and the Czech Republic. "To the Bright and Shining Sun" also featured on the EA Sports soundtrack for the UEFA Euro 2004 official licensed game.

==== Track listing ====
No.	Title	Length
1.	"Bone Deep"	3:18
2.	"Broken Boy"	3:27
3.	"Some Kind of Girl"	3:19
4.	"Chestnut"	4:50
5.	"Something's Wrong"	4:49
6.	"February's Gone"	4:00
7.	"New Born Baby"	4:03
8.	"Earthling"	3:19
9.	"Love Eluded Me"	3:23
10.	"Hartland Road"	4:03
11.	"One of Those Days"	3:49
12.	"If I Had You"	16:02
Total length:		58:22

=== 2004–2007; New Dawn Breaking ===
New Dawn Breaking

Studio album by The Walls
- Released: June 2005
- Genres: Rock; Indie rock
- Length: 51:51
- Label: Dirtbird Records

The Walls chronology
Hi-Lo (2000)	''New Dawn Breaking'' (2005)	Stop the Lights (2012)

For the next album, the band went to Studio Black Box in France to record with producer and ex-The Frames guitarist David Odlum. Originally scheduled for a release date in September 2004, The Walls decided to hold their album until the new year.

In October 2004, they released a taster, "Drowning Pool", a blues song. It took people by surprise and divided opinion. They supported Bob Dylan to a capacity crowd in Galway that summer and played a storming set that showed there were changes afoot in The Walls sound. They christened the album New Dawn Breaking after the final track on the record. It went straight into the Irish charts at no. 5 in its first week of release in June 2005 and produced four hit singles: "To the Bright and Shining Sun", "Passing Through", "Drowning Pool" and "Black and Blue".

The band kicked off 2007 with a gig in Dubai. They also supported Crowded House on their Australian comeback tour before retreating into their studio to work on their third album.

==== Track listing ====
No.	Title	Length
1.	"Open Road"	3:51
2.	"Passing Through"	3:17
3.	"To the Bright and Shining Sun"	3:35
4.	"Black and Blue"	3:51
5.	"Romantic Ireland's Dead and Gone"	3:47
6.	"Know Your Love"	6:20
7.	"Ghosts"	3:57
8.	"Out of the Fog"	4:44
9.	"Drowning Pool"	2:51
10.	"Highwire"	3:54
11.	"Birthday Girl"	4:09
12.	"New Dawn Breaking"	7:35
Total length:		51:51

=== 2010–2014; Stop the Lights ===
Stop the Lights

Studio album by The Walls
- Released: March 2012
- Genres: Rock; Indie rock
- Length: 45:03
- Label: Dirtbird Records

The Walls chronology
New Dawn Breaking (2005)	''Stop the Lights'' (2012)

In 2010, the double A-side "Carrying The Fire"/"Phantom Power" was released. Following this, in March 2011, the "Bird In A Cage" EP was released, of which the title track was revealed to also be on the band's forthcoming album Stop The Lights, which was to be released in 2012. Following this announcement, the band's new single "Stop The Lights" was released in January 2012.

Stop the Lights, The Walls' third album, was released on 9 March 2012, going top 20 in Ireland. The singles "Bird in a Cage" and "Stop the Lights" received strong airplay. Part-funded by the band's fans, people involved in the making of it include Rob Kirwan. For the artwork a five-meter high installation was designed and constructed by 'Conor & David'.

As well as playing some shows in Ireland, the band made their first trip to Russia in March 2013 playing Moscow, Bryansk and Kaluga. They played live on the Ivan Urgant TV show and on Moscow FM radio. They returned in 2014, playing three shows in Moscow.

Steve Wall returned to acting, landing roles in The Witcher (Netflix), Raised by Wolves (HBO), Tin Star for Sky Atlantic, Vikings (MGM/History Channel), Silent Witness (BBC), Crossing Lines and Rebellion (RTE/Sundance 2016).

Begin Again, the 2014 film, features The Walls' "Drowning Pool" throughout the opening credit sequence. The song is not included on the soundtrack album of the movie.

The song "Carrying The Fire" was later covered by The Stunning on their 2018 album Twice Around the World.

==== Track listing ====
No.	Title	Length
1.	"Bird in a Cage"	3:59
2.	"Phantom Power"	3:48
3.	"Stop the Lights"	4:14
4.	"The Great Escape"	4:14
5.	"It Goes Without Saying"	4:20
6.	"Dead Flowers"	3:46
7.	"All a Blur"	3:59
8.	"Carrying the Fire"	3:34
9.	"Doodlesque"	3:35
10.	"Thanks for the Photographs"	5:00
11.	"May the Road Rise"	5:00
Total length:		45:03

== Members ==
- Steve Wall
- Joe Wall
- Carl Harms (guitar/keyboards) (left February 2004)
- Rory Doyle (drums)
- Jon O'Connell (bass) (joined February 2004)

== Discography ==
"To the Bright and Shining Sun" (2002)
From the 2005 album " New Dawn Breaking".

=== Studio albums ===
- Hi-Lo (released May 2000)
- New Dawn Breaking (released June 2005) (reached No. 5 in Irish charts)
- Stop The Lights (released March 2012)

=== Singles and albums ===
- "The Night I Called It A Day" (Single, released Feb 1999)
- "Broken Boy" (Single, released Sept 1999)
- "Something's Wrong" (Single, released Apr 2000)
- "Some Kind of a Girl" (Single, released 2000)
- Hi-Lo (Album, released May 2000). A remix of one of the album tracks, Bone Deep, was popular in Ireland. Some songs featured on TV series and feature films: Bachelors Walk, Dead Bodies, Goldfish Memory and On the Edge.
- "To the Bright and Shining Sun" (Single, released 2002) reached No. 11 in the Irish charts.
- "Drowning Pool" (single, released 2004)
- "New Dawn Breaking" (Album, released June 2005) reached No. 5 in Irish charts and has produced four hit singles: "To the Bright and Shining Sun", "Passing Through", "Drowning Pool" and "Black and Blue".
- "Passing Through" (Single 2005)
- "Black and Blue" (Single 2005)
- "Carrying the Fire" / "Phantom Power" (double-A sided single, released Jun 2010)
- "Bird In A Cage EP" (4 Track EP, released Mar 2011)
- "Stop the Lights" (album) released May 2012)
- "Remixes" (4-track EP released Jan 2021 featuring remixes of The Night I called it a Day; Some kind of a Girl; Broken Boy and Bone Deep)
- "Chrome Heart" (single, released March 2022)

=== Cover versions and miscellaneous ===
- Cover version of Chaka Khan's "Ain't Nobody" on Even Better than the Real Thing Vol. 1
- Cover version of Natasha Bedingfield's "These Words" on Even Better than the Real Thing Vol. 2
- Cover version of U2's "With or Without You" on Even Better than the Real Thing Vol. 3
- Irish-language version of "To the Bright and Shining Sun" titled "Grian Gheal Lonrach" on the compilation album Ceol '08 (2008).
- Irish-language version of "Carrying The Fire" from "Stop The Lights" on "Rí-Rá le Hector" (2012) dubbed "An Tine Bheo Sa Chroí"

== Selected performances ==
- Supported U2 at Slane Castle, 2001
- Supported Red Hot Chili Peppers, 2002
- Supported Bob Dylan, Galway, 2005
- Supported Crowded House, Australia, 2007
