= Roesy (singer) =

Irish singer-songwriter

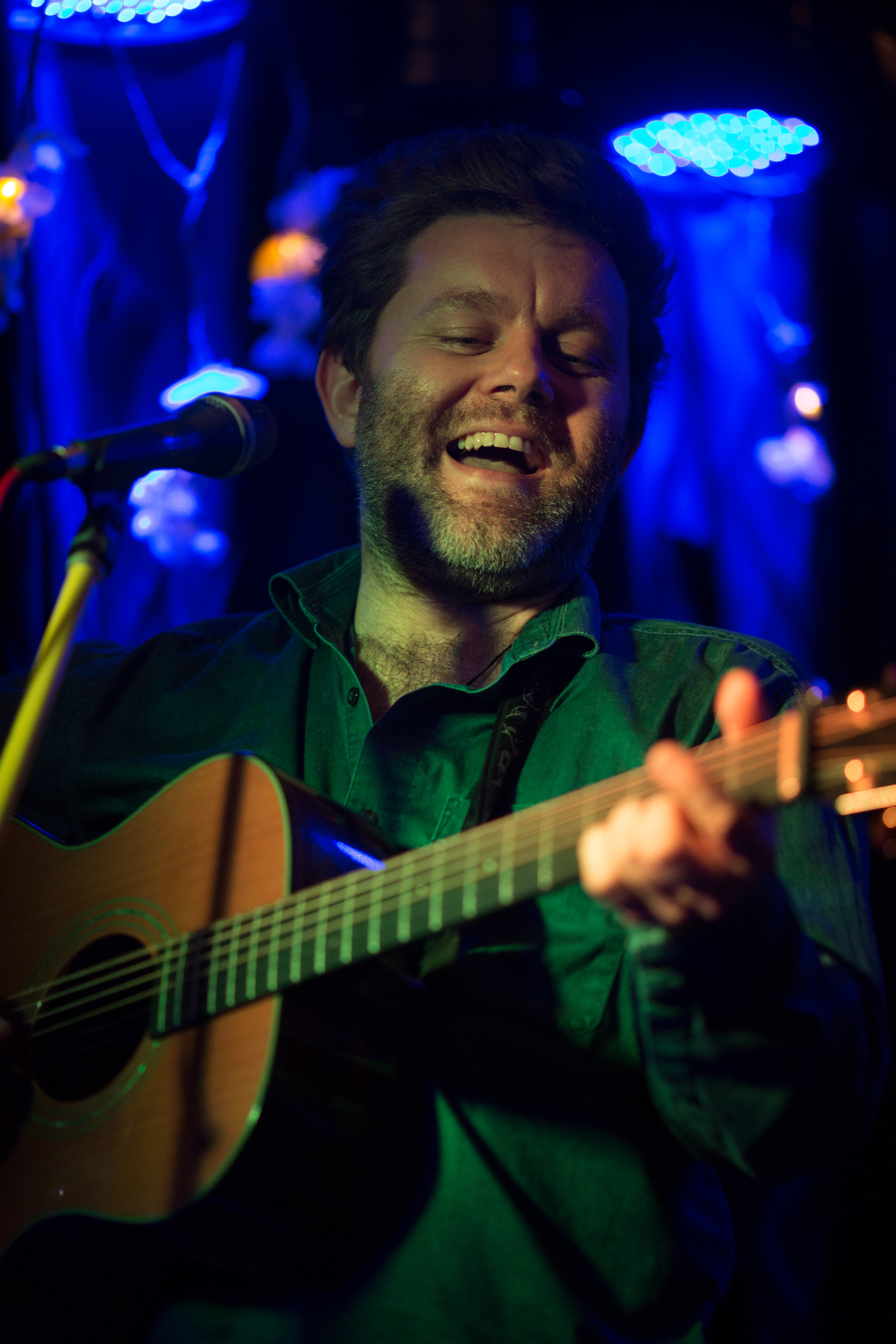
Roesy

Roesy, from Birr, County Offaly, is an Irish singer-songwriter.

== Career ==
His debut album "Sketch the Day, Paint the Night" (2001) was followed by "The Spirit Store" in 2003 and "Only Love is Real" in 2004. These albums were released on his Birr-based label Blue Cloak Records.

Through his career he has shared the stage with Bert Jansch, Ron Sexsmith, Paul Brady, Billy Bragg, John Martyn, Davy Spillane, Donovan, Shane MacGowan, fellow Offaly musicians Mundy and Dan Foley, plus celebrated Irish author Paul Durcan.

roesy© appeared in the first Other Voices TV series on RTÉ. He was nominated for Best New Irish Act in the 2004 Meteor Music Awards and voted no.8 in the Trad/Folk section of the Annual Hot Press Awards 2005. His song "Potosi Mine" was included in the "Diamond Mountain Session Presents" compilation CD, also featuring Sinéad O'Connor, Steve Earle, Natalie Merchant and Sharon Shannon.

On the 2003 charity album Even Better than the Real Thing Vol. 1, roesy© performed a cover version of the song Breathe by Blu Cantrell. On 2004's Even Better than the Real Thing Vol. 2, he performed a cover version of Beyoncé Knowles's Naughty Girl.
