= Brewing Up a Storm =

Single by The Stunning

from the album Paradise in the Picturehouse
- B-side: "All I Can Do"/"This Happy Girl"
- Genre: Rock
- Length: 3:29
- Label: Solid Records

"Brewing Up A Storm" (2006)
From the 1990 album "Paradise in the Picturehouse".

"Brewing Up a Storm" is the best-known song of the Irish musical ensemble The Stunning, popular in the late 1980s and early 1990s. It featured as the sixth track on the 1990 album Paradise in the Picturehouse, the second track on the 1992 album Once Around the World and the fourth track on 1994's Milking the Hits. The song has become an anthem and can still be heard in football stadiums and clubs around Ireland to this day. It is now also heard as the theme tune to the current affairs television programme Capital D and has also featured on the soundtrack to the 1991 film The Commitments.

The song was ranked number 21 on the Sunday Tribune's "ultimate playlist representing the top-50 Irish songs of all time" in 2008.
