= The Stunning =

Irish band

- Origin: Galway, Ireland
- Genre: Rock
- Years active: 1987—1994, 2003—present.
- Labels: Dirtbird Records, Earshot Records, Solid Records
- Spinoffs: The Walls, The Saw Doctors
- Members: Joe Wall; Steve Wall; Derek Murray; Jim Higgins; Cormac Dunne
- Past members: Donal Duggan; Ronan Kavanagh; Patrick Schutte
- Website: The Stunning official website

The Stunning are an Irish rock band. Formed in 1987 in Galway, they are perhaps best known for their singles "Brewing Up a Storm", "Romeo's on Fire", "Half Past Two", "Heads Are Gonna Roll". Known for their strong live performances, they maintain a large following across Ireland.

== History ==
=== 1987–1994 ===
The group was formed in 1987 by Steve Wall. The band played its first show in the Hilltop Hotel, Salthill, Galway. The original line-up also included Donal Duggan (saxophone), Ronan Kavanagh (keyboards) and Paddy Schutte (trombone), the latter three all leaving after the first couple of years to pursue other careers.

The first release was the single "Got to Get Away" (1988), licensed to Solid Records. It reached No. 17 in the Irish charts and received strong airplay on national radio. The band began a lengthy tour, starting in the west of Ireland and working their way east, ending the tour with their Dublin debut: a three-week residency at the Baggot Inn. More singles followed with "Half Past Two" (1988), "Romeo’s on Fire" (1989), and "Brewing up a Storm" (1989).

Their debut album Paradise in the Picture House was released under license on Solid Records in June 1990, reaching number one in the Irish charts and remaining there for five weeks. That year the band performed an early slot at the first Féile festival in Semple Stadium, Thurles and they toured constantly, building up a huge following nationwide.

The second album, Once Around the World, released on Solid Records, went straight into the number one spot and contained the hit singles "Heads", "Everything that Rises", "She’s on my Mind", and "Mr. Ginger". The Stunning were now one of the most successful bands in Ireland; that year they headlined the Féile festival at midnight, going on after Bryan Adams to a crowd of approximately 40,000 people.

Tours in the UK and the US followed. They opened for Bob Dylan over five nights in the Hammersmith Apollo in London and two weeks later played support to The B-52s on a UK tour. Regular shows in the Mean Fiddler (Harlesden), the Powerhouse (Islington) and the Grande (Clapham) had hoped to get the band noticed by UK record labels, but a deal never materialised. They made several trips to the US, playing in Boston, New York City, Northampton, San Francisco, Philadelphia and Portland, Maine, but these self-financed tours became impossible for the band to fund.

In 1993 they released an EP of cover versions Deja Voodoo, which reached number six in the charts. That summer they played two consecutive nights in the Galway Arts Festival, which were recorded and featured on the live album Tightrope, also released that year.

=== 1994 - The break-up ===
Due to various business disappointments and the lack of progress internationally, the band decided to split up. They performed a sell-out Irish tour in 1994, which included their fifth appearance at Féile, and concluded with two nights in the Warwick Hotel, Galway where the band were based. The Stunning have sold well over 100,000 albums in Ireland alone.

=== 2003-present ===
2003 – 9 years after breaking up, they re-issued Paradise in the Picture House on the imprint Dirtbird Records as a special edition with bonus tracks and a full-colour booklet. It went to number two in the Irish charts. They played 14 sold-out shows to over 20,000 people across the country.

2006 - they re-issued the live album Tightrope and completed an eight date Irish tour that Christmas taking in Dublin, Galway, Cork, Galway, Sligo, Castlebar, Ennis, Killarney.

2008 - the band completed a 12-date Irish tour and that summer they played to a massive crowd at the Electric Picnic festival in Stradbally, County Laois.

2009 - the band headlined the Friday night of the Volvo Ocean Race stopover in Galway city on 5 June. Around 25,000 people gathered around Galway docks to hear them play.

2012 - was the band's 25th anniversary and they celebrated with a six date tour that Christmas taking in Dublin, Kilkenny, Cork, Castlebar, Donegal and Galway. They played a follow-up concert in Galway for the Volvo Ocean Race again on 6 July, headlining the Saturday night to a crowd of around 30,000.

2013 - On 13 February The Stunning were the headline act for the NUIG Arts Ball, the largest formal dress ball in Ireland, in their 'hometown' of Gaillimh. On 8 June they also headlined the Helium Charity Festival in Ballymahon, County Longford in aid of Ataxia Ireland.

2014 - saw the band return to the US for the first time since 1993, performing at Terminal 5 in New York and the Royale, Boston with the Boomtown Rats and Mundy.

2015 - The Stunning went into Grouse Lodge studios, County Westmeath for two week-long periods to record new material and that summer they performed several festival shows around Ireland.

2016 - Following a summer of festival shows, Steve was cast as Chet Baker in a Dutch-produced film My Foolish Heart about the jazz musician's last days in Amsterdam in 1988. The film is due for release in 2018.

2017 - "Brighten up my Life", the Stunning’s first original single since 1993, was released in May 2017. They played a sold-out show in Dublin's Olympia Theatre on 6 October and announced a second for March 2018. Another new single "Always You" is released on 10 November 2017 and features the vocals of Danielle Harrison formerly of Irish electro-rock band Skindive. The band finished the recording and mixing of the album Twice Around the World, which is due for release in March 2018. 2018 - Twice Around the World, the band's first studio album in 26 years, was released on 16 March 2018. It features re-recordings of songs from 1992's Once Around the World, a cover of The Walls' "Carrying the Fire" from their 2012 album Stop the Lights, as well as the two new singles, "Brighten up my Life" and "Always You".

2021 - The band recorded a live performance film in Dublin featuring an array of special guests: Mundy, Máirtín O’Connor, Camille O’Sullivan, Zoe Conway, Faye O’Rourke, Niwel Tsumbu, Shobsy and Jon O’Connell. It was screened on the national television station RTE One on 17th December 2023.

2024 - The album "We Come Alive" was released on music streaming platforms in June.

2025 - "Brewing up a Storm" was featured in the Netflix series 'House of Guinness' and opened up the band's music to listeners outside Ireland.

2026 - "Brewing up a Storm" was featured in the MGM Plus series 'The Westies'.

=== After The Stunning ===
The founding members, brothers Steve and Joe Wall, formed the successful Irish band The Walls in 1998 releasing three acclaimed albums between 2000 and 2012. One of The Wall’s songs "Drowning Pool" - taken from the New Dawn Breaking album - was licensed for use in the opening credits in the movie Begin Again.

Steve Wall is now also an actor appearing in many films and television series and Joe Wall is lecturing at the music college BIMM, Dublin.

Derek Murray joined the Saw Doctors, and toured extensively in the US and UK. Jim Higgins spent a number of years playing around the world with Riverdance and since then has played with The Saw Doctors (drums), Altan (bodhrán, percussion) and Christy Moore (bodhrán, percussion). Cormac Dunne is a music teacher and session drummer.

== Discography ==
=== Studio albums ===
- Paradise in the Picture House (1990)
- Once Around The World (1992)
- Twice Around the World (2018)

=== Other albums ===
- Tightrope (1993) (live album)
- Milking the Hits (1994) (compilation album)
- We Come Alive (2024) (live performance album and film featuring special guests)

== Singles ==
- "Got To Get Away" (1988), Chart placement: Number 17
- "Half Past Two" (1988), Chart Placement: Number 19
- "Romeo's On Fire" (1989), Chart Placement: Number 24
- "Brewing Up a Storm" (1989/1991)
- "Merry Christmas Baby" (1990), Chart Placement: Number 24
- "Heads (Are Gonna Roll)" (1991), Chart Placement: Number 5
- "Everything That Rises" (1992), Chart Placement: Number 6
- "She's On My Mind" (1992), Chart Placement: Number 12
- "Mr. Ginger" (1992), Chart Placement: Number 22
- "Deja Voodoo EP" (1993), Chart Placement: Number 8
- "Run and Hide" (2013), Chart Placement: Number 6
- "Brighten up my Life" (2017)
- "Always You" (2017)
- "Stand Up in this Wicked World" (2025)
