= Jenny Kelly =

Irish radio presenter

- Born: 6 May 1972 (age 54); Dublin, Ireland
- Other name: Jenny D'Arcy
- Education: Trinity College, Dublin
- Employer: Today FM
- Known for: Co-hosting The Ray D'Arcy Show on Today FM
- Spouse: Ray D'Arcy (m. 2013)
- Children: 2

Jennifer D'Arcy (née Kelly; born 6 May 1972) is an Irish radio personality who came to prominence during the 2000s as Ray D'Arcy's producer on his self-titled radio show on Today FM. The pair now have one daughter and one son together. Kelly previously worked for East Coast FM and then for the state broadcaster's pop music station RTÉ 2fm.

Reared in South Dublin county, Kelly's father Michael was a lawyer and a major influence on her career. Jenny would attend horse races with him, and was seen at the Galway Races in 2003 whilst running in the 2.30 race. She attended St Joseph of Cluny's primary school and Newtown School in Waterford for her secondary education before spending time delved in theatre studies at Trinity College, Dublin.

Before obtaining a position in RTÉ, Kelly volunteered for a place at Dublin South Community Radio and received in return a weekly half-hour arts programme to present. She began working with state broadcaster RTÉ in 1994, working on 2FM where her first national broadcast took place from on top of the world's biggest, fastest roller coaster. In 1997, she joined East Coast Radio, where she co-presented The Breakfast Show and produced the mid-morning show. Early in 2000, she transferred to Today FM to work in music programming with Phil Cawley and Tim Kelly. In September 2000, D'Arcy joined the station and The Ray D'Arcy Show began. When Kelly's father, Michael, died in his sleep on 8 April 2011, she learned of the death from Today FM chief executive Willie O'Reilly while on air. The Ray D'Arcy Show was abruptly taken off the air, prompting thousands of texts and calls from worried listeners.

Living in Dublin, the pair have two children: daughter Kate was born 25 November 2006, shortly after 20:00, at Mount Carmel Hospital and weighing just above seven pounds. She went into labour after laughing when watching Pat Kenny get heckled on live television on The Late Late Show. The pair were stalked by the tabloid press when D'Arcy publicly exposed their partnership on Saturday Night With Miriam in 2005. They attended the wedding of Tommy Tiernan as a couple. In January 2012, they announced their engagement and that they were pregnant with a second child. In June 2012, D'Arcy and Kelly had their second baby, a son called Tom Michael D'Arcy.
