= The Saturday Night Show =

- Opening titles for The Saturday Night Show
- Genre: Light entertainment
- Presented by: Brendan O'Connor
- Starring: Brendan O'Connor
- Country of origin: Ireland
- Original language: English
- No. of seasons: 11
- No. of episodes: 133+

Production
- Executive producer: Larry Masterson
- Producer: Various
- Production locations: Studio 4, RTÉ Television Centre, Donnybrook, Dublin 4
- Camera setup: Multi-camera
- Running time: 80 minutes

Original release
- Network: RTÉ One
- Release: 30 January 2010 – 30 May 2015

Related
- Tubridy Tonight; Tonight with Craig Doyle; The Late Late Show

The Saturday Night Show is a talk show hosted by Brendan O'Connor broadcast on RTÉ One between 2010 and 2015. The show features guest interviews, audience participation and live music. The Saturday Night Show is broadcast every Saturday night during the autumn-spring season directly after RTÉ News: Nine O'Clock, the main evening news bulletin.

== Background ==
Following Pat Kenny's stepping down as host of The Late Late Show in 2009, RTÉ announced that Ryan Tubridy, host of his own Saturday night chat show, would be Kenny's replacement. Tubridy Tonight had aired since 2004 and had regularly drawn an audience of up to half a million since the first series. The departure of Tubridy to the Friday night slot left a gap in the schedule. In late 2009 RTÉ announced that it was to commission a new Saturday night entertainment show that would be fronted by "an established name or a combination of established names". Miriam O'Callaghan and Gerry Ryan, two broadcasters who lost out in the battle to succeed Kenny as host of The Late Late Show, were two names that were mentioned as possible hosts. It was hoped that the show would be "high energy", would "provide a distinctively Irish take on contemporary entertainment" and proposals for the show's format could include "chat, music, comedy, satire or some other element, such as audience participation, games, etc". It was reported by the Evening Herald that the programme would have a budget of €90,000 per programme. Newspaper reports in late 2009 revealed that the new chat show would be hosted by Sunday Independent journalist Brendan O'Connor and Lucy Kennedy, however, these reports were unfounded.

In a new departure RTÉ decided to pit two new chat shows against each other. Brendan O'Connor, who moved to RTÉ from The Apprentice: You're Fired! on TV3, would present The Saturday Night Show for an initial run of eight weeks before handing over to Craig Doyle who would present Tonight with Craig Doyle for a further eight weeks. Whichever chat show proved successful would be recommissioned for a further series.

The Saturday Night Show made its debut on 30 January 2010 for an initial run of eight programmes. Peaches Geldof and Jim Corr were the first interviewees while Republic of Loose were the first musical guests.

Following the completion of both The Saturday Night Show and Tonight with Craig Doyle it was decided to recommission the former for a second series. It proved more popular with the audience than Craig Doyle's show which was panned by the critics and regarded as a flop.

On 14 March 2015, O'Connor announced that the programme would end that May, with Ray D'Arcy to take over the Saturday night slot from the following autumn.

== Broadcast history ==
=== Dates ===
Series	Broadcast dates	Total shows
1	30 January 2010 – 27 March 2010	8
2	25 September 2010 – 28 May 2011	31
3	24 September 2011 – 2 June 2012	33
4?	2012–2013?	
5?	2013–2014?	
6?	2014 – 30 May 2015	

=== Incidents ===
The Saturday Night Show achieved cult status for numerous incidents, many of them rather coincidentally involving the common theme of homosexuality.

On the debut show, musician Jim Corr of The Corrs spoke about his belief that the truth about the September 11 attacks is being suppressed, that swine flu may have been man-made and that American military weapons caused the 2010 Haiti earthquake. Corr also argued that climate change is a hoax and that a secret society is trying to establish a one-world government.

British entertainer Michael Barrymore also appeared on the first series. During a bizarre interview Barrymore pretended to be a sheep before claiming to be the father of Jedward.

In February 2010, Ray D'Arcy took on Enda Kenny by vowing he would leave Ireland after the February 2011 general elections if Kenny became Taoiseach after previously comparing the man to a four-day-old floury potato. The audience applauded as D'Arcy continued: "If you listened to Enda Kenny during the week, he said 'I'm now going to be myself'. He's the longest-serving TD, he's been eight years as leader of Fine Gael and now he decides he's going to be himself."

Garret FitzGerald made his final TV appearance on the show in 2011.

Alex Reid proposed to Chantelle Houghton when the British celebrities appeared on the show on an episode broadcast on 8 October 2011.

Oliver Callan announced he was gay on the show on an episode broadcast on 29 October 2011.

Newly-weds Alan Hughes and Karl Broderick joined Brendan to discuss their whirlwind love affair on 5 November 2011, announcing that it was their first interview as a couple despite having been involved with each other for 18 years.

The Saturday Night Show continued its gay theme by having Chris Burch, the stroke survivor who woke up to discover he was gay, as a guest, with Alex James also talking about how he makes cheese. Johnny Robinson was a guest on The Saturday Night Show on 3 December 2011.

During a November 2011 performance by The Overtones, Brendan O'Connor had to hold up a curtain after a "terrible mishap occurred in the RTÉ studio". The incident was nominated for the "Brown Trousers Moment" award at the 2011 Erics.

In January 2012, chef Antony Worrall Thompson gave his first television interview since his arrest for shoplifting.

In May 2014, O'Connor asked his guest, the Labour minister Aodhán Ó Ríordáin, to remove a pin calling for a 'Yes' vote in the Marriage Referendum from the jacket of his collar.

The final guest on the last episode was gay Labour TD John Lyons and his mammy.

== Endangered crew ==
In February 2010, a 59-year-old RTÉ props assistant injured himself after falling over a studio floor lamp while working on The Saturday Night Show. He was eventually awarded €18,500 in damages and the judge said he had worked accident free in RTÉ for 38 years, that he had been working in poorly lit conditions in a cluttered studio when he was injured by one of RTÉ's props, and that he had been in pain since sustaining his injury.

== End ==
On 14 March 2015, O'Connor announced without warning live on air his resignation as host of The Saturday Night Show. The presenter and Sunday Independent journalist said that the light entertainment show would finish for good at the end of that series on 30 May 2015. RTÉ announced that Ray D'Arcy, who left the independent radio station Today FM to return to RTÉ, would be replacing O'Connor with a new entertainment show in RTÉ One's Saturday night slot, coming autumn 2015. O'Connor also announced he was not leaving RTÉ and would be hosting a new prime-time show for the broadcaster beginning in 2016. Ryan Tubridy knew this. Critics were unimpressed with the decision to axe The Saturday Night Show calling it "just the latest round in the apparently never-ending game of moving the same dreary old furniture around the same dreary old room."

== Production ==
The Saturday Night Show is broadcast live from Studio 4 in the RTÉ Television Centre at Donnybrook, Dublin 4. That studio is also home to the show's Friday night rival The Late Late Show. As RTÉ's biggest studio, it holds 200 audience members. The first two programmes in the first series (broadcast on 30 January and 6 February 2010) were pre-recorded at 7:30 p.m. on the same dates that both shows were aired. All subsequent programmes have been broadcast live.

Preceded by Tubridy Tonight	Saturday night programming on Telefís Éireann (initially versus Tonight with Craig Doyle); 2010–2015	Succeeded by The Ray D'Arcy Show
