= The Ray D'Arcy Show (TV series) =

Irish television series

- Genre: Chat show
- Directed by: Patrick Cowap
- Presented by: Ray D'Arcy
- Country of origin: Ireland
- Original language: English
- No. of series: 1
- No. of episodes: 11

Production
- Executive producer: Michael Kealy
- Producer: John Downes
- Production locations: Studio 4, RTÉ Television Centre, Donnybrook, Dublin 4, Ireland
- Running time: 80 minutes

Original release
- Network: RTÉ One
- Release: 26 September 2015 – 2019

Related
- The Saturday Night Show (2010-2015); The Late Late Show

The Ray D'Arcy Show is an Irish chat show presented by Ray D'Arcy. It was first broadcast on RTÉ One on 26 September 2015, airing on Saturday evenings, and was cancelled after the 2019 series.

== Production ==
On 7 December 2014 it was announced that D'Arcy was leaving independent commercial radio station Today FM after fourteen years to join state broadcaster RTÉ, with whom he had previously worked. Derek Mooney was making way so D'Arcy could present a daily programme on RTÉ Radio 1. The production of various "television projects" in RTÉ was also mentioned. Speculation immediately turned to what role D'Arcy would have on RTÉ Television, with a quiz show and an Ant and Dec-style evening entertainment being mentioned. D'Arcy himself told the RTÉ Guide it wouldn't be something he was interested in: "When I was in my 30s I would have aspired to doing something like that, but, no, absolutely no desire now." The possibility of D'Arcy hosting a weekend chat show seemed more likely following Brendan O'Connor's announcement on 14 March 2015 that his Saturday Night Show would be coming to an end after five years. D'Arcy later confirmed that he would be taking over O'Connor's prime time Saturday night slot.

Pre-production of D'Arcy's new Saturday night chat show began in August 2015. Figures released under the Freedom of Information Act revealed that RTÉ spent €136,000 on the set. This was €24,000 more than was spent on Ryan Tubridy's set when he took over as host of The Late Late Show. The new set was the brainchild of award-winning designer Sinead O'Hanlon.

== Series ==
The first series of 32 shows began at 9:45pm on 26 September 2015. The very first show– which featured guests including Tulisa and Tommy Tiernan – attracted 468,500 viewers, a 35% share of the audience. Ratings for the first show were lower than Brendan O’Connor's final Saturday Night Show, when some 501,900 viewers tuned in - a 38% share. It was also lower than the series average for O’Connor's first season in 2010 which was 463,700 – a 34% share.

The second D'Arcy show lost 107,000 viewers, as people tuned to rival TV3 to watch the 2015 Rugby World Cup game between England and Australia.

D'Arcy's fifth show on 24 October 2015 had an average of 356,000 viewers and a 29% audience share. This was in contrast to the previous nights Late Late Show which had almost twice the audience with 707,000 viewers for its country music special.

== Episodes ==
As of 12 December 2015, The Ray D'Arcy Show had broadcast twelve episodes since its debut on 26 September 2015. It was cancelled after the 2019 series.
