= Juliet Turner =

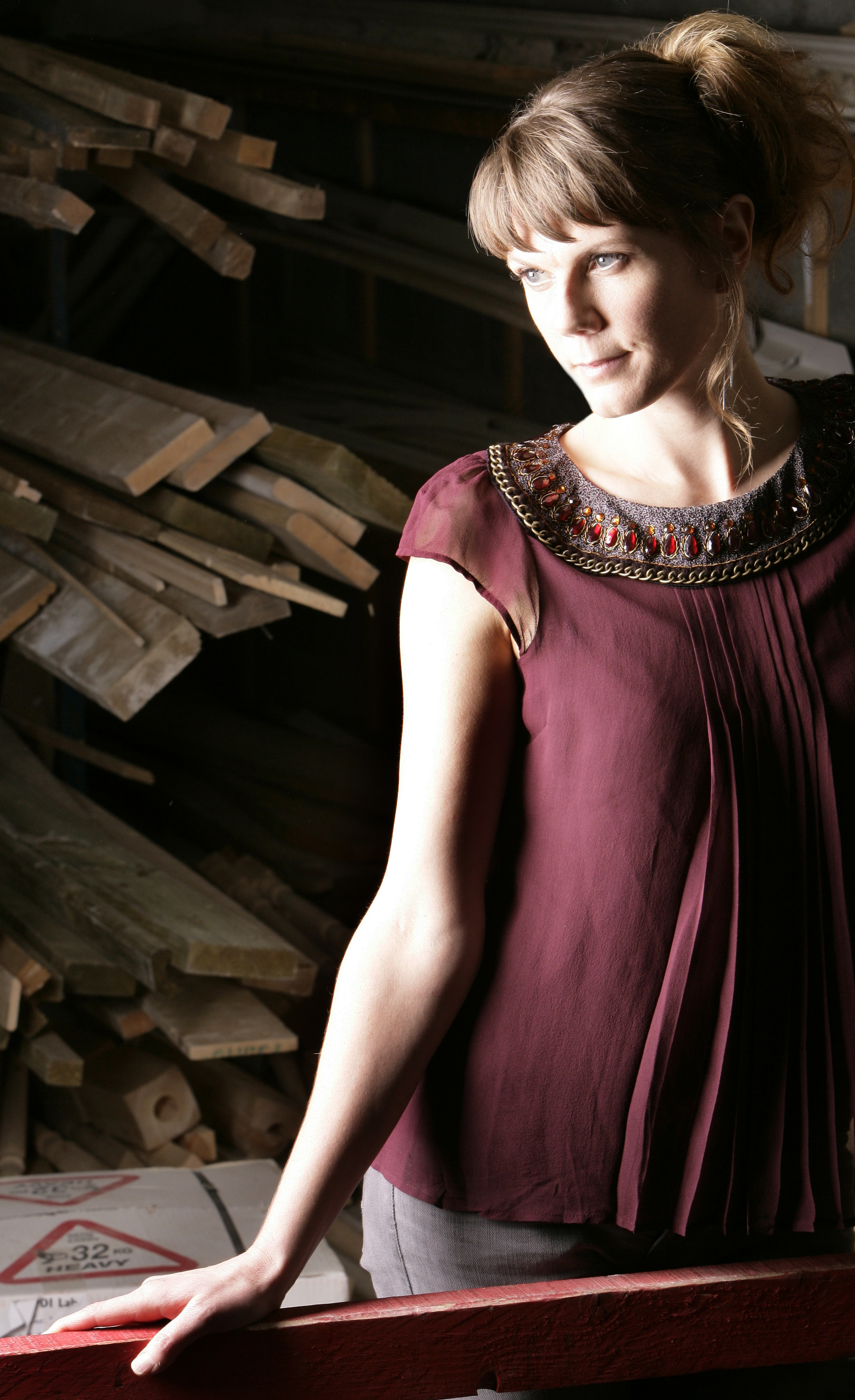

Background information
- Born: County Tyrone, Northern Ireland
- Genres: Pop, rock, folk
- Instruments: Vocals, guitar
- Years active: 1996–present
- Website: julietturner.music

Juliet Turner is a singer/songwriter from Tummery, near Omagh, County Tyrone, Northern Ireland. She started recording in 1996, and has opened for such artists as Bob Dylan, U2, Bob Geldof, and Bryan Adams. She also toured with Roger McGuinn, Joan Armatrading and Brian Kennedy. Turner also sang on two tracks of Peter Mulvey's live album Glencree.

== Career ==
Born near Omagh in County Tyrone, Turner later attended university in Dublin.

Her first album, "Lets Hear it for Pizza", was released in 1996 on the small independent label "Sticky Music", followed by "Burn the Black Suit" released on her own "Hear This! Records" label. This album went double platinum in Ireland, and was voted one of the top 100 Irish albums of all time by HotPress Magazine readers. In August 1998, Turner sang the song "Broken Things" (originally released by American Julie Miller) at the memorial service for the victims of the Omagh bombing. She initially ruled out releasing the song as a single, although it did subsequently appear on the compilation Across The Bridge Of Hope.

In Autumn 2002, Turner picked up a "Best Newcomer in Music" award from the London-based Irish Post newspaper and another award for her contribution to music from Tatler Magazine at their Women of the Year ceremony in Dublin.

Turner covered Britney Spears' "Toxic" for Today FM's CD Even Better than the Real Thing Vol. 2 (2004), and recorded a cover of "I Still Haven't Found What I'm Looking For" by U2 for Even Better than the Real Thing Vol. 3 (2005).

In 2004, Turner released "Season of the Hurricane" which went gold in Ireland, followed by a live album "Juliet Turner Live from the Spirit Store" in 2006. In February 2005, Turner was awarded the Meteor Music Award for best Irish female performer.

From September 2006 to June 2010, Turner studied for a degree in Clinical Speech and Language Studies at Trinity College Dublin, while also undertaking gigs to support the album People Have Names. On its release in 2008, "People have Names" was described by the Irish Times as "a gloriously taut collection of songs", by the Belfast Telegraph as "The album of her life", and HotPress as "a serious contender for album of the year".

In October 2025 Juliet released a new EP, Home From The Sea, produced by her long-term collaborator and close friend Stevie J Jones and featuring cello by former bandmate Harry Napier. Something of a stylistic departure from previous records, it is a spacious, downtempo record where Turner's voice is carefully wrapped in lush instrumentation and given room to breathe. The final track on the EP, Any Old Excuse features a choir of voices led by her and her sisters, but also including Iain Archer, Peter Alexander Jobson (formerly of I Am Kloot) and Welsh singer-songwriter Martyn Joseph.

== Discography ==
=== Albums ===
- 1996 - Let's Hear It for Pizza
- 2000 - Burn the Black Suit
- 2004 - Season of the Hurricane
- 2005 - Live from the Spirit Store
- 2008 - People Have Names
- 2025 - Home From The Sea

=== Singles ===
- 2000 - "Take the Money and Run"
- 2000 - "Dr Fell"
- 2001 - "Burn the Black Suit"
- 2003 - "Everything Beautiful is Burning" / "Tuesday Night Ladies"
- 2004 - "1987" / "Belfast Central"
- 2004 - "Vampire" / "Instrumental"
- 2005 - "Business as Usual" / "The Girl with the Smile"
- 2012 - "The House at the Top of the Hill"
