= Craig Doyle =

Irish television and radio presenter

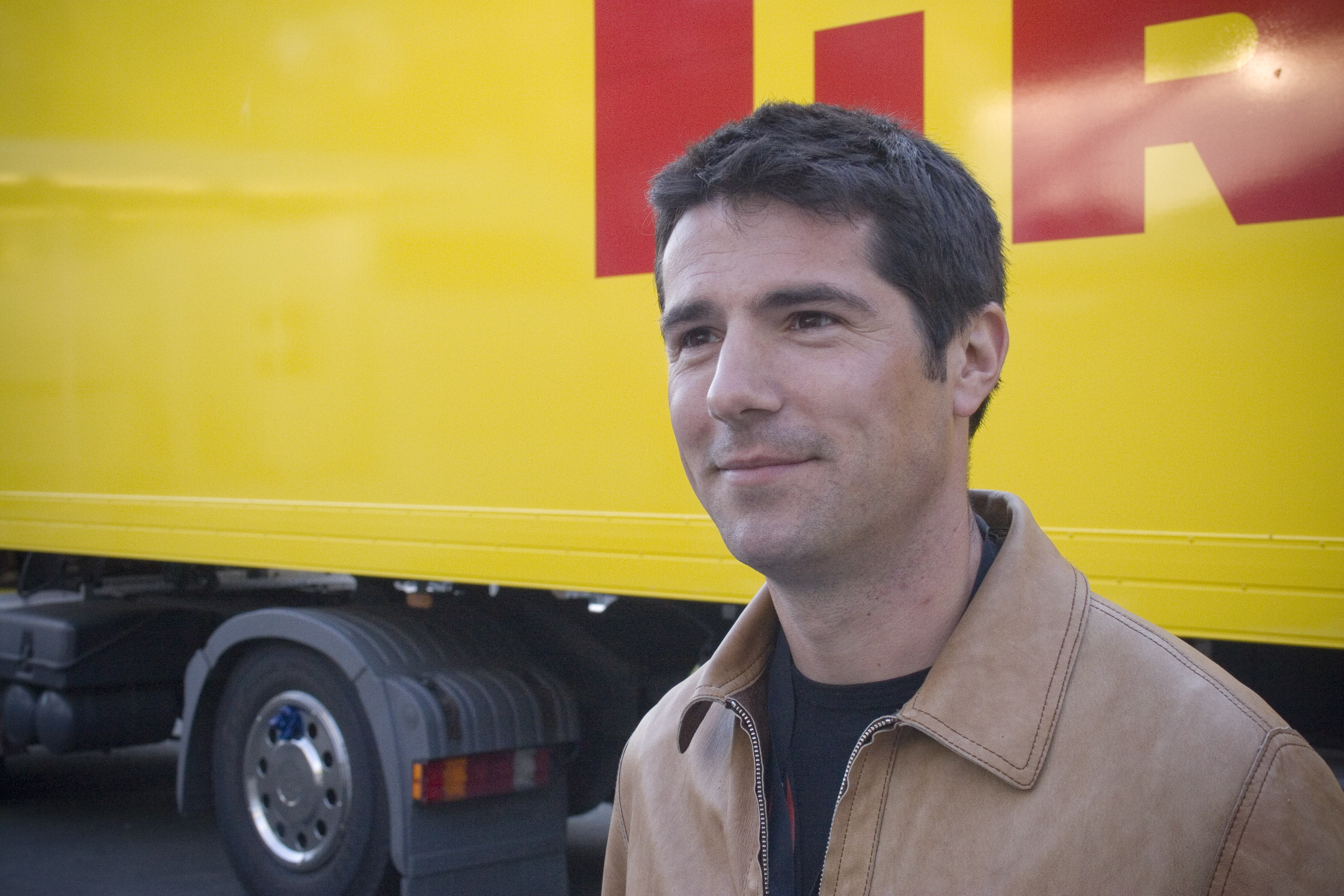
- Doyle at the Isle of Man TT in 2009
- Born: 17 December 1970 (age 55); Dublin, Ireland
- Education: St Patrick's College, Maynooth, Diploma of Broadcast Journalism: London College of Printing
- Occupations: Television and radio presenter
- Years active: 1995–present
- Notable credits: This Morning (2022—present); Tonight with Craig Doyle (2010); Premiership Rugby presenter on BT Sport & TNT Sports. MotoGP presenter on BT Sport & TNT Sports
- Spouse: Doon Hutson Doyle (m. 2002)
- Children: 4

Craig Doyle (born 17 December 1970) is an Irish television and radio presenter. To British viewers he is recognisable as working for the BBC and ITV and more recently TNT Sports; Irish viewers also know him as the host of RTÉ One chat show Tonight with Craig Doyle and RTÉ2's Craig Doyle Live. He is affiliated with TNT Sports' coverage of Premiership and European Champions Cup rugby coverage and MotoGP motorcycle racing. He has also been a presenter on ITV's Rugby World Cup coverage. Since 2022, Doyle has been a relief presenter on ITV daytime series This Morning.

== Early life ==
Doyle was born on 17 December 1970, and was raised in the Dublin suburb of Stillorgan. Educated in Blackrock College. He studied sociology and history at Maynooth, followed by the London College of Printing, where he earned a diploma in broadcast journalism.

== Broadcasting career ==
After graduation, Doyle worked on local radio with BBC Radio Suffolk based in Ipswich, before moving on to ITV to present the children's show Disney Club in 1995, following a chance meeting with a producer from the show at a visit to Alton Towers.

Moving to London, he presented Tomorrow's World, Fasten Your Seatbelt and Innovation Nation, and spent six years hosting BBC One's Holiday. He had a live music show on London's Capital Radio every Saturday 8 am – 11 am.

Doyle was a member of the BBC Sport team from 2004, presenting coverage of international rugby, including the Six Nations Championship, and triathlon. He also presented a nightly highlights show alongside Clare Balding for the Athens 2004 Olympic Games. He supports London Irish. In 2004, he formed his own production company. Its first production was The Craig Doyle Show, an Irish travel/celebrity programme running on RTÉ.

Released early from his BBC contract, Doyle joined ITV Sport in February 2008, replacing Jim Rosenthal by hosting the UEFA Champions League highlights on ITV and ITV4's coverage of the Isle of Man TT. Doyle left Capital Radio at the end of 2008.

In April 2010, Doyle returned to Irish TV to host his own chat show, Tonight with Craig Doyle on RTÉ One. In September 2010 he joined the team on ITV's Lorraine as an investigative reporter. Doyle presented Irish satirical programme The Panel up to 2011. He subsequently became the presenter for a new live chat show called The Social from November 2011, which returned to screens in 2012 as Craig Doyle Live .

He presented Now That's What You Called News for RTÉ over the Christmas at the end of 2011.

Doyle has presented coverage of Rugby Union on BT Sport since 2013. He presented BT Sport's coverage of MotoGP between 2015 and 2018.

Since November 2021, Doyle has been appearing on ITV show This Morning usually presenting the competitions and entertainment segments. In May 2022 he appeared as a guest presenter on the show alongside Alison Hammond. He has relief presented alongside Josie Gibson, Mollie King and Rochelle Humes during the school summer holidays on This Morning in 2022 and has since become a relief presenter on the show.

In the week beginning 22 January 2024, Doyle appeared as a contestant on the BBC Two game show Richard Osman 's House of Games. Doyle finished third, behind comedian Leo Reich and scientist and entrepreneur Anne-Marie Imafidon.

== Other activities ==
Doyle presented the ESAT Young Scientist Exhibition in Dublin, sponsored by BT Ireland in 2005. He is prominent in the UK fronting the adverts of double-glazing company Everest Windows. In Ireland he has featured in advertising campaigns for Littlewoods Ireland.

Doyle is the Honorary President of London Irish Supporters Club.

== Personal life ==
In January 2002, Doyle married his longtime girlfriend Doon. The couple have four children and live in County Wicklow.
