= Brian Cowen nude portraits controversy =

Left: A painting hung in the National Gallery of Ireland
Right: A painting hung in the Royal Hibernian Academy

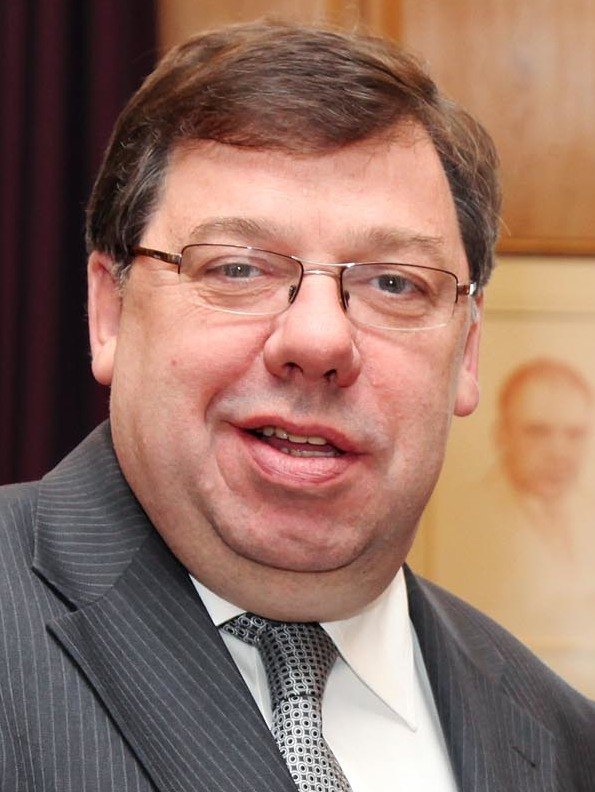
Brian Cowen. subject of the portraits

Two oil paintings depicting the then-Taoiseach Brian Cowen in the nude were briefly displayed in Dublin art galleries in March 2009. The response of the media, politicians and the Garda Síochána (Irish police force) led to a sustained controversy referred to by some as Portraitgate.

== Portraits ==
The artist, initially unidentified, was eventually revealed to be Conor Casby, a school teacher in his thirties from Claremorris, County Mayo. The first portrait was surreptitiously hung in the National Gallery of Ireland on 7 March 2009. Casby is said to have entered the National Gallery carrying a shoulder bag, and located a free space for his portrait and its caption among other portraits of prominent Irish people such as Michael Collins, W. B. Yeats, and Bono. Casby then left the building unnoticed by security. The caption was reported as having read:

Brian Cowen, Politician 1960–2008. This portrait, acquired uncommissioned by the National Gallery, celebrates one of the finest politicians produced by Ireland since the foundation of the state. Following a spell at the helm of the Department of Finance during a period of unprecedented prosperity, Brian Cowen inherited the office of Taoiseach in 2008. Balancing a public image that ranges from fantastically intelligent analytical thinker to Big Ignorant Fucker from Offaly, the Taoiseach proves to be a challenging subject to represent.

The National Gallery called gardaí after it discovered the unauthorised painting. It has claimed that it had been hanging in public view for no more than twenty minutes before it was removed, contradicting the Sunday Tribune's claim that it hung for over an hour.

The following day, 8 March, Casby hung a second painting of Cowen in the Royal Hibernian Academy (RHA). A woman attempted to buy the RHA portrait before it was removed.

Both paintings depict Cowen from the waist up, wearing only his glasses. In the RHA painting, he is holding a pair of blue and white underpants in his left hand. In the other, he is clutching a toilet roll.

== Media reports ==
Sunday Tribune reporter Ken Foxe was contacted by a source at the National Gallery on 9 March and was the first to break the story of Cowen's portraits. Subsequently, "Topsy Campbell" (a pseudonym for Casby) sent camera phone photographs of the paintings on display. The incidents were first reported in the Tribune of 22 March.

=== RTÉ ===
On 23 March, public broadcaster RTÉ ran a report on the hangings at the end of the Nine O'Clock News. The report by Tadhg Enright displayed the paintings, obtained an appraisal of zero from an art expert, and mentioned that Cowen was "not thought to have posed for the anonymous artist". The report was not used on subsequent newscasts. On 24 March, the Nine O'Clock News included an apology "for any personal offence caused to Mr Cowen or his family or for any disrespect shown to the office of Taoiseach by [the prior] broadcast." The original item was removed from the online archives at RTÉ.ie, and the apology added.

=== Today FM ===
On 24 March, The Ray D'Arcy Show on commercial radio station Today FM, covered the story. Producer Will Hanafin revealed that a friend of the artist had e-mailed photographs of a similarly styled painting to him in January, a caricature of the Taoiseach urinating in a full-frontal nude pose. This painting has not been displayed publicly. A Garda detective visited the station requesting the emails. The Garda was said to have been "sheepish and apologetic" about the visit but indicated that he had received an order from "on high" to initiate an investigation. Hanafin refused to comply with the Garda request and, being told that a search warrant would be sought, labelled the entire affair as "crazy".

=== Abroad ===
The incident was covered by foreign newspapers, including The Times of London. It was also covered in Canada.

=== Online ===
Blogs and social network services such as Twitter were reported to be popular outlets for members of the general public to express their dissatisfaction at the attempted censorship and apology of RTÉ. A YouTube video of the original RTÉ news report had received more than three thousand views within twenty-four hours. The affair was nicknamed "Picturegate" and "Cowengate" in online discussions.

== Garda investigation ==
The Garda investigation was said to have taken six hours. The possible crimes were offending decency, incitement to hatred, and criminal damage for nailing the painting to the wall (though it has also been reported that paintings were hung without the use of nails). Investigators telephoned Casby and he entered Pearse Street Garda Station where he was interviewed for two hours, admitted to having hung the two paintings and was subsequently released. He gave gardaí five more portraits of other politicians, including Michael McDowell. A file was prepared for the Director of Public Prosecutions, but it was expected that no charges would be brought. Casby expressed his desire to "draw an end" to the matter by auctioning the paintings for charity.

== Political reaction ==
The incidents attracted comment from politicians.

The RTÉ News report was criticised as being in bad taste by Fianna Fáil Senators Maria Corrigan and Mary O'Rourke and TDs M. J. Nolan and Michael Kennedy. Fine Gael TD Michael W. D'Arcy called it the "most distasteful report I have seen on RTÉ in years". Kennedy urged consideration for the feelings of Cowen's wife and children, and called on Director-General of RTÉ Cathal Goan to resign, but did not advocate charging the artist.

Some suggested the government had put pressure on RTÉ to withdraw the report and apologise, or on Today FM to co-operate with the Garda. The station received several complaints that the report was in bad taste, including one from the government press secretary, Eoghan Ó Neachtain, who claimed he was acting on his own initiative. Fine Gael's Enda Kenny and Charles Flanagan called it a restriction on freedom of expression.

Liz McManus of the Labour Party criticised RTÉ for "bow[ing] to political pressure". RTÉ claimed the decision to withdraw the report was taken by RTÉ executives, and that Ó Neachtain's complaint was received after the late-night News on Two had already been broadcast without the report.

Some criticised the Garda investigation as a waste of resources. Fine Gael's Frances FitzGerald said it was "over the top"; Rónán Mullen defended it as appropriate. Labour's Joan Burton said "While I sympathise with the Taoiseach and his family, the public has noticed that it took gardaí six months to go into the Anglo Irish Bank."

== Legacy ==
The incidents are referred to in the 2009 episode of Reeling in the Years.

In 2011, it was reported that both paintings were on display in Sean Mac D's pub in Dublin.

== See also ==
- List of places where social nudity is practised
