= Will Hanafin =

Irish journalist

- Born: William Hanafin; Youghal, County Cork
- Education: Dublin City University; King's Inns
- Spouse: Mary Kirwan
- Children: Ethan

William Hanafin is an Irish journalist, researcher, television producer and radio presenter from Youghal, County Cork.

Hanafin was a print journalist with the Irish Examiner before working as a researcher on The Late Late Show. He spent the final year of Gay Byrne's tenure and the first four years of Pat Kenny's tenure working on The Late Late Show. He also trained as a television producer with state broadcaster RTÉ, obtained a degree in zoology and is a qualified barrister. His writing can be read in the Sunday Independent.

A feature on The Ray D'Arcy Show on Today FM, largely in the background offering advice to listeners but sometimes presenting the show by himself, he has been with Today FM for four years and presented his own segment, "Where there's Will... There's a way!", on the difficulties listeners encounter in removing awkward stains. On several occasions he has provoked talking points on the airwaves, such as the time he failed his third driving test and the occasion he broke his knee and had to have surgery or his numerous articles. In addition, he was famously questioned by the Guards in 2009 over nude portraits of the Taoiseach, initially declining to co-operate and later describing the entire affair as "crazy".

Writer of De Little Book of Bertie about former Taoiseach Bertie Ahern, this was the first book dedicated to Bertiespeak.
