= Kevin McGahern =

Irish comedian (b. 1986)

- Born: 7 November 1986 (age 39); Lough Gowna, County Cavan, Ireland
- Education: University of Wolverhampton

Kevin McGahern (born 7 November 1986) is an Irish comedian, TV presenter, writer and actor. He hosted Republic of Telly between 2013 and 2017 and documentary series Kevin McGahern’s America in 2016.

== Early life ==
McGahern was born in 1986 and grew up on a farm in Gowna, County Cavan. McGahern graduated from the University of Wolverhampton in 2009 with a degree in animation. He became a stand-up comedian after working as a barman in the birthplace of Irish stand-up comedy, the International Bar. He stated in an interview that the two biggest influences on his early stand up were Steve Martin and Dylan Moran.

== Career ==
In 2011, McGahern starred in the independent feature film No Party for Billy Burns which was written and directed by Padraig Conaty. The film also stars Shane Connaughton, Sonya O'Donoghue and Charlie McGuinness. In 2013, McGahern became the host of Republic of Telly replacing Dermot Whelan. He continued to host the show until its eventual cancellation in 2017, and was the longest serving host of the show.

In 2017, McGahern hosted his own documentary series Kevin McGahern's America in which he explored various aspects of life in America: gun rights, intimacy in the digital age, and whether you really can choose your family. It received positive reviews and McGahern was praised for his "low-key yet alert" interviewing style. He also acted in the award-winning black comedy, Redemption of a Rogue. In 2021, McGahern hosted the RTÉ comedy panel show Clear History alongside team captains, Joanne McNally and Colin Murphy. The series returned in 2022 with McGahern and McNally joined by new captain Jason Byrne.

== Other work ==
Outside of his career in stand-up and presenting, McGahern is known for his acting work. Chris Tordoff, creator of Hardy Bucks, spotted McGahern during a stand-up performance one night in Dublin and offered him a cameo on his new show. McGahern's character, 'Sim Card', quickly became a regular cast member. In 2012, McGahern co-wrote a play; The Devil's Ceili with Philip Doherty, which was performed during the 2012 Fleadh Cheoil na hÉireann in Cavan Town. The play was subsequently produced in 2014 by the Leitrim based group Corn Mill Theatre Group, and went on to win two awards including best play at the All-Ireland Drama Festival that year. The play presents the psychedelic experiences of three social climbers in a small Cavan town who are slipped LSD by the devil. In 2018, he starred in the Dublin Fringe Festival musical Trial of the Centurys, alongside Tony Cantwell and Peter McGann.

McGahern has also had TV acting roles in Irish comedy series, including Bridget & Eamon, The Doireann Project, Nowhere Fast and Finding Joy. Between 2021 and 2022, McGahern had a recurring role as 'Michael Foley' in the RTÉ drama series, Smother. In 2021, McGahern had a two-episode guest role on the CBBC musical science-fiction series, Nova Jones.

== Activism ==
McGahern often uses satire for activism. The Republic of Telly sketch "Felix Bollard: A Serious Man" lampooned anti-LGBT rights campaigners' activities during the run-up to the marriage equality referendum of 2015 in Ireland. Along with fellow Irish comedian Tara Flynn, he wrote and starred in a video for LGBT Noise called "Armagaydon". The video had a swell of international support. As well as speaking out in favour of marriage equality, McGahern has also campaigned in favour of a "yes" vote in the 2018 abortion referendum.

== Personal life ==
McGahern married Siobhan Cassidy in 2017. They have two children together.
