= Roger Schlaifer =

American writer and artist

Roger L. Schlaifer
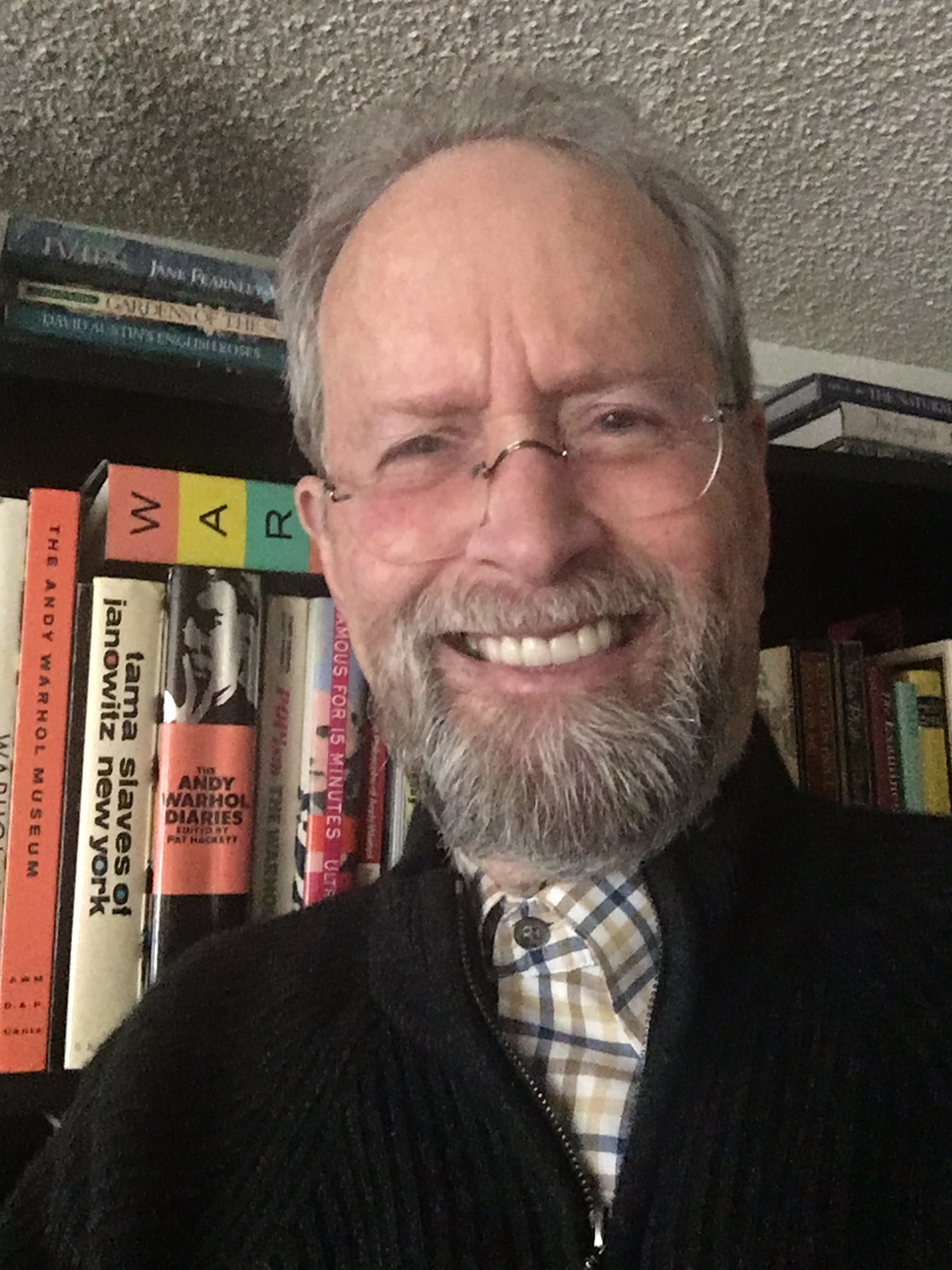
- Schlaifer in 2020
- Born: Roger L. Schlaifer; February 23, 1945 (age 81); Newark, New Jersey, United States
- Education: Syracuse University, BA, MFA; Rhode Island School of Design; ArtCenter College of Design
- Occupations: Graphic designer, writer, inventor and licensing agent
- Known for: Cabbage Patch Kids

Roger L. Schlaifer (born February 23, 1945) is an American graphic designer, writer, inventor and licensing agent. He is best known for his creative development and worldwide licensing of Cabbage Patch Kids and the name and works of Andy Warhol.

== Early life and education ==
Schlaifer grew up in the Washington, D.C. suburb of Silver Spring, Maryland where he attended Montgomery Blair High School, also the alma mater of Nora Roberts, Goldie Hawn, Ben Stein, Carl Bernstein and Connie Chung.

Schlaifer is a 1967 graduate of Syracuse University with a BFA in illustration, and a master's degree in advertising. He took a leave of absence from Syracuse in 1966 to attend the Rhode Island School of Design where he studied graphics under Malcolm Greer and photography with Harry Callahan. In 1968, Schlaifer did a year of graduate studies at Art Center College of Design in Pasadena.

== Career ==
Following his military service in the National Guard, Schlaifer joined Ziff Davis Publishing in Washington, D.C. as an art director. He moved to Atlanta and became creative director at Bozell & Jacobs Advertising in 1972.

In 1974 Schlaifer and his wife, Susanne, started Schlaifer Nance & Company, developing print advertising, packaging and collateral pieces for clients including Coca-Cola, Rushton Toys and IBM.

In 1978 Schlaifer branded an early jogging-shoe roller-skate as Hot Rollers and licensed the Hot Roller brand for kids’ apparel, skates and fashion accessories which sold at stores such as Bloomingdales, Belk's and Mervyn's.

Building on the success of his licensing Hot Rollers, in 1981 Schlaifer proposed an exclusive, worldwide licensing agreement with Xavier Roberts’ company, Original Appalachian Artworks, for the rights to "Little People" soft sculpture dolls and Babyland General Hospital. Schlaifer rebranded the "Little People" dolls as Cabbage Patch Kids. In addition to signing up Coleco Industries on August 9, 1982, as its "master toy licensee", Schlaifer ultimately licensed over 140 other manufacturers, publishers and entertainment companies to produce thousands of different Cabbage Patch Kids branded products. By the end of 1982, Coleco Industries had shipped over 3.2 million dolls.

Cabbage Patch Kids was the most successful children's licensed property of its day—generating over $4 billion in retail sales of licensed merchandise during the six years of Schlaifer's tenure. Original Appalachian Artworks acquired Schlaifer's licensing rights in 1988.

In addition to creating the Cabbage Patch Kids logos, packaging, and the characters, he co-wrote with wife Susanne Nance, The Legend of the Cabbage Patch Kids published by Parker Brothers’ Books under the title Xavier’s Fantastic Discovery.

In 1985 Schlaifer commissioned Andy Warhol to do portraits of four of his Cabbage Patch Kids. Schlaifer secured worldwide licensing rights to the artists name and works from the Warhol estate in November, 1987.

Additional intellectual properties created and/or developed by Schlaifer and his SN&C team, are Little Souls, and McNutts bedding for Springs Industries and Department 56. After inventing and patenting Odds’R: The Odds On Everything Game in 2002, Schlaifer wrote a compendium of similar Q&A published by Bantam Dell as Odds’R: The Odds On Everything Book.

Schlaifer's recently completed novel Who Killed Andy Warhol?, is the first fictional account of the events leading up to Warhol's death and what followed in its aftermath.

== Awards ==
In 1986, Schlaifer received the Outstanding Graduate award from Syracuse University's School of Visual and Performing Arts, and gave the school's convocation address to the graduating class in the spring of the same year. He was also Founding Chairman of the Imagine It! The Children's Museum of Atlanta a former board member of the Galloway School and the Temple, both in Atlanta, Georgia.
