= Andy Quirke =

Irish actor and producer

Andy Quirke is an Irish actor and producer best known for his dual performance in Damo and Ivor.

== Personal life ==
Andy Quirke's father is the late businessman Richard Quirke - owner of the Dr. Quirkey's Good Time Emporium chain of casinos in Dublin. He has a brother, model Wesley Quirke, the husband of 2003 Miss World, Rosanna Davison. The Quirke brothers are estimated to be worth €25 million from their shareholdings in Dr. Quirkey's. He is also dyslexic.

== Anti-immigration activism ==
In February 2024, it was reported that a social media channel, associated with Quirke's Damo and Ivor show, had been used to "broadcast far-right rhetoric". Quirke did not comment on it and, while aware of the claims, RTÉ also did not comment on the reports.

In September 2024, Quirke made a number of comments on social media about RTÉ, stating that "RTE is nothing but a daily propaganda machine for a corrupt government that is trying to enforce globalism".

Quirke distributed thousands of Irish tricolour flags ahead of a 26 April 2025 far-right anti-immigration march in Dublin, which was reportedly attended by over 10,000 people.

== Filmography ==
Year	Title	Role	Notes
2011	Republic of Telly	Damo / Ivor	1 Episode
2013-2014	Damo & Ivor	Damo / Ivor	12 Episodes, also writer and producer
2018	Damo & Ivor: The Movie	Damo / Ivor	Released 2018, also writer and producer
