= Breakfast Republic =

- Genre: Comedy, talk, music
- Running time: 240 minutes (6:00 am-10:00 am)
- Country of origin: Ireland
- Language(s): English
- Home station: RTÉ 2fm
- Hosted by: Keith Walsh; Jennifer Zamparelli; Bernard O'Shea; Lottie Ryan
- Recording studio: RTÉ Radio Centre, Donnybrook, Dublin 4
- Original release: 17 February 2014 – 9 May 2019
- Audio format: FM and Digital radio
- Website: Official website

Breakfast Republic was the Irish national broadcaster RTÉ 2fm's breakfast radio show. It was presented by Keith Walsh and comedians Jennifer Zamparelli and Bernard O'Shea, from 6–10am weekdays. It first aired on 17 February 2014. Regular features include Jen's Bits, where Zamparelli offers dry or caustic views on members of the celebrity world, and Smarty Pants, where Bernard regularly pretends to be less intelligent than he actually is.

O'Shea and Zamparelli have wide experience in television, notably as part of the similarly toned "Republic of Telly". 2015 polls indicate the show's popularity with a rise in listenership of 10,000, bringing the average to 109,000.

Preceded by Breakfast with Hector	RTÉ 2fm's breakfast show 2014 – 2019	Succeeded by 2FM Breakfast with Doireann and Eoghan
