= Furskin Bears =

Type of plush toy bears

Furskins was a series of plush toy bears in different sizes and guises created by Xavier Roberts in the 1980s. Furskins are a highly collectible item, yet are not as highly sought by collectors as Robert's most notable creation Cabbage Patch Kids.

== Background ==
Created by Xavier Roberts, Furskins were produced by Panosh Place, Roberts’s Original Appalachian Artworks and Coleco from 1983 to the late 1980s.

== The Furskins Bear series ==
Each Furskins Bear had its own unique attire, name and character background story in the valley of Moody Hollow. Bear sizes were styled into two main types, with a novel third. A set of 8 original five-inch posable bears began the series, followed by a second set of 8 five-inch posable bears out of popular demand. A subsequent set of 16 twenty two-inch bears were created as the demand for the toy grew. The Furskins series was rounded out by the addition of 6 small bears. Four special collectible bears were created for and sold at Wendy's for $1.99 during the 1980s.

Additional clothing was available for Furskins, as were playsets, for collectors to own. Playsets included the Moody Hollow Express and Moody Hollow General Store.

== Furskins Bear character names ==
Each Furskin hailed from Moody Hollow and had a unique look to match the character's story. Some popular Furskins characters were:

- Selma Jean Furskin—the Possum Queen of Moody Hollow has a ribbon attached crown, sash, pants and shoes.
- Hattie Furskin—"the pie baker of Moody Hollow" Peach multi colored dress with blue ribbon.
- Dudley Furskin—"the general store manager" striped overalls and scarf.
- Cecelia Furskin—middle sized red fur, red and white plaid shirt with lace. Denim dress and cowboy hat.
- Fannie Fay Furskin—"School Marm" pale pink print dress, solid pale pink pinafore, dark pink stretch stockings.
- Boon Furskin—"the sweet-toothed beekeeper" straw hat, bug net, bees, flannel shirt and khakis.
- J. Livingston Clayton Furskin—middle sized - tracker explorer a.k.a. Scout - Camo and hunting cap.
- Persimmon Furskin—middle sized baker's assistant. Light blue dress flowers apron with two pockets and headband.
- Bubba Furskin—middle sized best tater farmer (sweet) east of Idaho. Blue overalls, red long johns and bandanna.
- Hank "Spitball" Furskin—middle sized, baseball hat, red.
- Baby Thistle Furskin—middle sized, diapers.
- Junie Mae Furskin—middle sized square dancer in blue polka dot dress, lace slip and yellow ribbon.
- Farrell Furskin -- "the Moody Hollow Postmaster" hat, flannel shirt and "trademark bowtie".
- Humphrey Furskin—blue (or other colored) tee-shirt.
- CeCe Furskin
- Debonaire Bear
- Jam Furskin
- Wizards
- Coleco 1st 8 issue: Orville T (aviator) Jedgar (sheriff) Selma Jean (possum queen) Fannie Faye (school marm) Boone (bee keeper) Farrell (postmaster) Dudley Furskin (store manager) Hattie (baker)
- Coleco 2nd 8 issue: Bubba (potato farmer) Cecelia (handywoman) Hank “Spitball” (baseball player) June Mae (squaredancer) Lila Claire Persimmon (baker’s assistant) J Livingstone Clayton “Scout” (scout) Thistle (the baby)
- Wendy’s Furskins Bears: Farrell, Hattie, Boone, Dudley
- Panosh Place Furskins: Dudley, Boone, Farrell, Hattie, Bubba, Cece, Lila Claire, Thistle, Persimmon, Hank Spitball, Jedgar, Junie Mae, Scout, Orville T., Selma Jean
- Hide and Seek Furskins (Baby Furskins): Molasses, Jam, Flour, Sugar, Candy, Honey

== Collectability ==
Xavier Roberts's Furskins vary in collector value depending on condition and desirability.
