= Cabbage Patch Dreams =

Studio album by Cabbage Patch Kids
- Released: 1984
- Recorded: Mastermind Recording, New York
- Genre: Children
- Length: 26:00
- Label: Parker Brothers
- Producer: Stephen Chapin and Tom Chapin

Cabbage Patch Dreams is the first album by the Cabbage Patch Kids, released in 1984 by Parker Brothers Music, which tries to put together a storyline for them.

== Track listing ==
Side 1

1. "Cabbage Patch Theme" (T. Chapin, S. Chapin) (1:52)
2. "Babyland" (John Forster) (2:46)
3. "Villains Three" (T. Chapin, S. Chapin) (3:36)
4. "Good Ole Otis Lee" (R. M. Sherman, R. B. Sherman) (1:55)
5. "Happy Birthday Hoe-Down" (R. M. Sherman, R. B. Sherman) (2:30)

Side 2

1. "The BunnyBee Song" (R. M. Sherman, R. B. Sherman) (2:18)
2. "Get Back Home" (John Carney) (2:04)
3. "Run, Run, Run" (T. Chapin, S. Chapin) (3:46)
4. "Cabbage Patch Dreams" (R. M. Sherman, R. B. Sherman) (2:07)
5. "Cabbage Patch Parade" (R. M. Sherman, R. B. Sherman) (2:30)

== Vocals ==
- D'Jamin Bartlett - Lavender McDade
- Jen Chapin - Rachel-Marie
- Stephen Chapin - Backing Vocals
- Tom Chapin - Backing Vocals
- Jessica Craven - 'Kid
- Rebecca Feit - 'Kid
- Ari Gold - Sybil Sadie
- Russell Horton - Beau Weasel
- Knowl Johnson - 'Kid
- John Henry Kurtz - Colonel Casey, Cabbage Jack
- Jonathan Paley - 'Kid
- Tracy Paul - 'Kid
- Jamilla Perry - 'Kid
- The Suits - Backing Vocals

== Personnel ==
- Stephen Chapin - producer
- Tom Chapin - producer
- James A. Buchanan - executive producer
- William C. Coleburn - executive producer
- Jaime Chapin - production coordinator
- Keith Walsh - engineer
- Jim Regan - assistant engineer

== Musicians ==
- Dennis Anderson - saxophone, clarinet
- Dave Bargeron - trombone, tuba
- Don Frank Brooks - harmonica
- Charlie Brown - electric guitar
- John Campo - bassoon
- Stephen Chapin - piano
- Tom Chapin - guitar, percussion
- Barbara Hart - flute
- Robbie Kondor - synthesizer, piano
- Kenny Kosek - fiddle
- Barry Lazarowitz - drums
- George Marge - bass clarinet
- John Miller - bass guitar
- Don Payne - bass guitar
- Wayne Pedzwater - bass guitar
- Georg Wadenius - electric guitar
- Eric Weissberg - banjo, steel guitar
