= Jingle All the Way =

1996 film by Brian Levant

- Theatrical release poster
- Directed by: Brian Levant
- Written by: Randy Kornfield
- Produced by: Chris Columbus; Michael Barnathan; Mark Radcliffe
- Starring: Arnold Schwarzenegger; Sinbad; Phil Hartman; Rita Wilson; Robert Conrad; Jim Belushi
- Cinematography: Victor J. Kemper
- Edited by: Kent Beyda; Wilton Henderson; Adam Weiss
- Music by: David Newman
- Production companies: 1492 Pictures; Fox Family Films
- Distributed by: 20th Century Fox
- Release dates: November 16, 1996 (Mall of America); November 22, 1996 (United States)
- Running time: 89 minutes
- Country: United States
- Language: English
- Budget: $60–75 million
- Box office: $129.8 million

Jingle All the Way is a 1996 American Christmas comedy film directed by Brian Levant. The film stars Arnold Schwarzenegger and Sinbad as Howard Langston and Myron Larabee, two rival fathers living in Minneapolis desperately trying to purchase the popular Turbo Man action figure for their respective sons on a last-minute shopping spree on Christmas Eve. The film's title is borrowed from the lyrics of the popular Christmas song "Jingle Bells".

The film was written by Randy Kornfield. Producer Chris Columbus rewrote the script, adding in elements of satire about the commercialization of Christmas, and the project was picked up by 20th Century Fox. Delays to Fox's reboot of Planet of the Apes allowed Schwarzenegger to come on board the film, while Columbus opted to cast Sinbad instead of Joe Pesci as Myron. Jingle All the Way was set and filmed in the Twin Cities of Minneapolis and Saint Paul at a variety of locations, including the Mall of America. After five weeks of filming, production moved to California, where scenes such as the end parade were shot. The film's swift production meant merchandising was limited to a replica of the Turbo Man action figure used in the film.

Upon release, Jingle All the Way grossed $129.8 million but received generally negative reviews from critics for its uneven tone. In 2001, Fox was ordered to pay $19 million to Murray Hill Publishing for stealing the idea for the film; the verdict was overturned three years later. Jingle All the Way is the third and final collaboration between Sinbad and Phil Hartman after Coneheads (1993) and Houseguest (1995), and the last film featuring Hartman to be released during his lifetime before he was murdered in 1998. In 2014, the film was followed by a sequel in name only, Jingle All the Way 2, starring Larry the Cable Guy.

== Plot ==
In Minneapolis, workaholic mattress salesman Howard Langston loves his wife Liz, and nine-year-old son Jamie, but rarely finds time for them. He is often put in a bad light by his neighbor, divorcé Ted Maltin, who harbors unrequited feelings for Liz. Howard misses Jamie's karate class graduation, due to being pulled over by Officer Hummel.

Howard resolves to redeem himself by fulfilling Jamie's Christmas wish for a Turbo Man action figure based on the popular television superhero. Liz in fact asked him to buy the toy two weeks earlier, which he forgot about. On Christmas Eve, Howard sets out to buy the toy but finds that every store has sold out. In the process he develops a rivalry with Myron Larabee, a postal worker father with the same goal.

In desperation, Howard attempts to buy a figure from a counterfeit ring run by con artists dressed in Santa suits, which results in a massive fight in the warehouse, broken up by the police. He narrowly escapes arrest by posing as an undercover officer. Exhausted at his failure and out of fuel, Howard goes to Mickey's Diner and calls home, intending to tell Liz the truth.

Jamie answers the phone but keeps reminding Howard of his promise to be home on time for the annual Holiday Wintertainment Parade. Losing his patience, he yells at his son. When Howard tries to apologize, Jamie scolds him for not keeping his promises, causing him to feel guilty. Howard then has coffee and bumps into Myron once more. During a discussion of what Christmas was like to them when they were kids, they overhear radio station KQRS-FM advertising a competition for a Turbo Man doll where the first caller has to name all of Santa Claus' reindeer. Howard and Myron both know the answer, and the two fight over the phone which gets disconnected. When the waiter tells them that the radio station is right nearby, the two of them race out of the diner and head to the station. Myron throws mail at Howard to distract him but to no avail. Howard manages to get to the station first, and when the DJ is about to play a song ("Jingle Bell Rock" by Bobby Helms), he tries to break into the studio which leads to the DJ calling the police. Howard manages to make his way into the studio and tells the DJ the correct answer. Myron shows up and threatens Howard with a package, which he claims is a bomb, but when Howard opens the package, it's a music box playing Christmas music. The DJ tells them about the contest and Howard is declared the winner. When they ask the DJ if he has the Turbo Man doll, he gives Howard his prize which is actually a Turbo Man gift certificate; he had said on the radio that the winner would get the doll sometime after Christmas when the stores were able to start selling them again. The police arrive, but Howard and Myron escape after Myron threatens the officers by pretending one of his packages is a bomb. However, when Officer Hummel opens the package, it actually explodes, much to Howard and Myron's shock.

Upon returning home, Howard finds Ted putting the star on his family's Christmas tree. In retaliation, he starts to steal the Turbo Man doll Ted bought for his son Johnny but cannot bring himself to do it. Liz catches him in the act, and Howard is left alone while his family goes to the Christmas parade with Ted and Johnny.

After dropping off Jamie and Johnny, Ted attempts to seduce Liz, but she rejects him. Meanwhile, remembering his promise to Jamie to go to the parade, Howard decides to attend as well, but runs into Officer Hummell again. The resulting chase leads to Howard hiding inside a storage room, where he is mistaken for the actor portraying Turbo Man.

As Turbo Man, Howard uses his chance to present the special edition action figure to Jamie. However, they are confronted by Myron dressed as Turbo Man's archenemy, Dementor. Despite Howard's pleas for Myron to stop, another chase ensues, during which Myron grabs the toy from Jamie but is cornered by the police, while Howard rescues Jamie.

Howard reveals himself to his family and apologizes for his shortcomings. Officer Hummell returns the toy to Jamie, who decides to give the toy to Myron for his son. The entire parade then praises Howard as his son admits his performance as Turbo Man was the best present he could get.

In a post-credits scene, Liz, admiring the lengths that Howard went to for Jamie's gift, asks Howard what he got her for Christmas, and Howard realizes in horror that he completely forgot to buy her a gift.

== Cast ==
- Arnold Schwarzenegger as Howard Langston
- Sinbad as Myron Larabee
- Phil Hartman as Ted Maltin
- Rita Wilson as Liz Langston
- Robert Conrad as Officer Alexander Hummell
- Martin Mull as a KQRS D.J. (Mr. Ponytail Man)
- Jake Lloyd as Jamie Langston
- James Belushi as Mall Santa
- E.J. De La Pena as Johnny Maltin
- Laraine Newman as First Lady actress
- Harvey Korman as President actor
- Richard Moll as Dementor actor
- Curtis Armstrong as Chain Smoking Booster
- Danny Woodburn as Tony the Elf
- Paul Wight as Giant Santa (credited as Paul "The Giant" Wight)
- Daniel Riordan as Turbo Man actor
- Bruce Bohne as Santa at Warehouse Door
- Phil Morris as Gale Force
- Amy Pietz as Liza Tisch
- Chris Parnell as Toy Store Sales Clerk
- Nick LaTour as Counterman
- Kate McGregor-Stewart as Toy Store Customer
- Verne Troyer as Mini Santa (uncredited)

== Production ==
=== Development ===
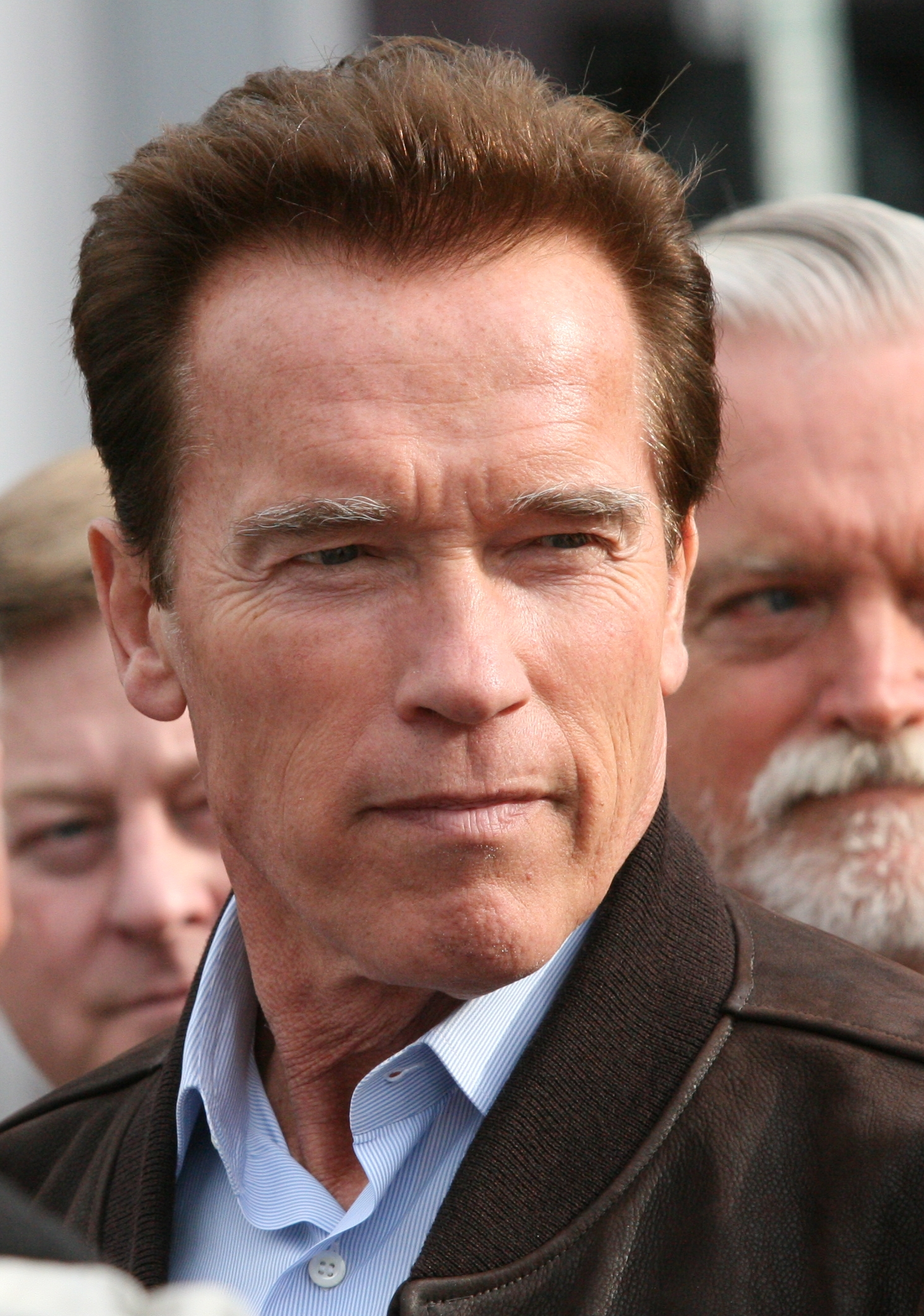
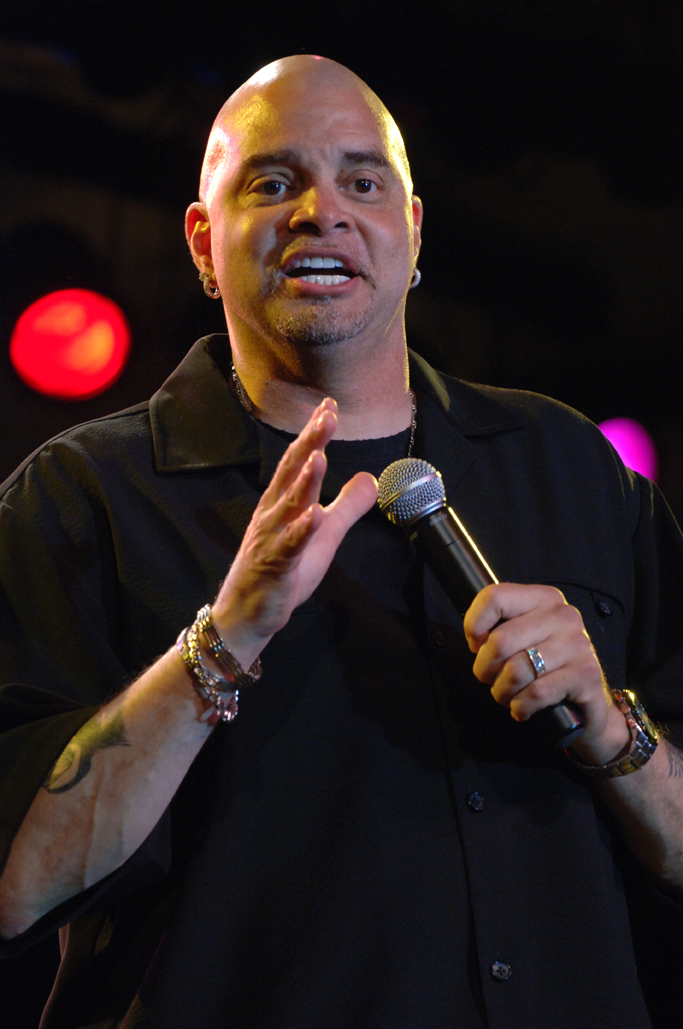
Arnold Schwarzenegger (left) and Sinbad (right) starred in the film as the lead characters.

The film draws inspiration from the high demand for Christmas toys such as the Cabbage Patch Kids and Mighty Morphin Power Rangers in the late 1980s and early 1990s, which often led to intense searching and occasional violence among shoppers, such as the Cabbage Patch riots, over finding the toys. Randy Kornfield wrote the film's original screenplay after witnessing his in-laws go to a Santa Monica toy store at dawn in order to get his son a Power Ranger. While admitting to missing the clamor for the Cabbage Patch Kids and Power Rangers, producer Chris Columbus experienced a similar situation in 1995 when he attempted to obtain a Buzz Lightyear action figure from the film Toy Story, released that year. As a result, he rewrote Kornfield's script, which was accepted by 20th Century Fox. Columbus was always "attracted to the dark side of the happiest holiday of the year", so wrote elements of the film as a satire of the commercialization of Christmas.

Brian Levant was hired to direct the film. Columbus said Levant "underst[ood] the humor in the material" and "was very animated and excited, and he had a vision of what he wanted to do". Levant said "The story that was important to me was between the father and son... It's a story about love, and a father's journey to deliver it in the form of a Turbo Man doll. The fact that I got to design a toy line and do the commercials and make pajamas and comic books was fun for me as a filmmaker. But at its root, the movie's about something really sweet. It's about love and building a better family. I think that's consistent with everything I've done."

Arnold Schwarzenegger was quickly cast. He became available in February 1996 after Fox's remake of Planet of the Apes was held up again; Columbus also exited that project to work on Jingle All the Way. The film marks Schwarzenegger's fourth appearance as the lead in a comedy film, following Twins (1988), Kindergarten Cop (1990) and Junior (1994). Schwarzenegger was paid a reported $20 million for the role. He enjoyed the film, having experienced last-minute Christmas shopping himself, and was attracted to playing an "ordinary" character in a family film. Columbus initially wanted Joe Pesci to play Myron. Comedian Sinbad was chosen instead, partly due to his similar height and size to Schwarzenegger. Sinbad was suggested for the part by Schwarzenegger's agent, but the producers felt he was unsuited to the role of a villain as it could harm his clean, family-oriented comedy act and reputation, although Sinbad felt the character would generate the audience's sympathy rather than hate. Furthermore, he missed the audition due to his appearance with First Lady Hillary Clinton and musician Sheryl Crow on the USO tour of Bosnia and Herzegovina, but Columbus waited for him to return to allow him to audition and, although Sinbad felt he had "messed" it up, he was given the part. He improvised the majority of his lines in the film; Schwarzenegger also improvised many of his responses in his conversations with Sinbad's character.

=== Filming ===
Filming took place in Minnesota for five weeks from April 15, 1996; at the time, it was the largest film production to ever take place in the state. Jingle All the Way was set and filmed in the Twin Cities metropolitan area of Minnesota at locations such as Bloomington's Mall of America, Mickey's Diner, downtown Minneapolis, Linden Hills, residential areas of Edina and primarily downtown Saint Paul. Unused shops in the Seventh place Mall area were redecorated to resemble Christmas decorated stores, while the Energy Park Studios were used for much of the filming and the Christmas lights stayed up at Rice Park for use in the film. The Mall of America and the state's "semi-wintry weather" proved attractive for the studio. Although Schwarzenegger stated that the locals were "well-behaved" and "cooperative", Levant often found filming "impossible" due to the scale and noise of the crowds who came to watch production, especially in the Mall of America, but overall found the locals to be "respectful" and "lovely people." Levant spent several months in the area before filming in order to prepare. The film uses artistic license by treating Minneapolis and Saint Paul as one city, as this was logistically easier; the police are labeled "Twin Cities Police" in the film. Additionally, the city's Holidazzle Parade is renamed the Wintertainment Parade and takes place on 2nd Avenue during the day, rather than Nicollet Mall at night. Levant wanted to film the parade at night but was overruled for practical reasons.

The parade was filmed at Universal Studios Hollywood in California on the New York Street set, due to safety concerns. The set was designed to resemble 2nd Avenue; the parade was shot from above by helicopters and stitched into matte shots of the real-life street. It took three weeks to film, with 1,500 extras being used in the scene, along with three custom-designed floats. Other parts of the film to be shot in Los Angeles included store interiors, and the warehouse fight scene between Howard and the criminal Santas, for which a Pasadena furniture warehouse was used. Turbo Man was created and designed for the film. This meant the commercials and scenes from the Turbo Man TV series were all shot by Levant, while all of the Turbo Man merchandise, packaging and props in the film were custom-made one-offs and designed to look "authentic, as if they all sprang from the same well." Along with Columbus and Levant, production designer Leslie McDonald and character designer Tim Flattery crafted Turbo Man, Booster and Dementor and helped make the full-size Turbo Man suit for the film's climax. Principal production finished in August; Columbus "fine-tun[ed] the picture until the last possible minute," using multiple test audiences "to see where the big laughs actually lie."

== Music ==
Jingle All the Way

Soundtrack album by Various artists
- Released: November 26, 1996
- Recorded: 1996
- Genre: Christmas
- Length: 36:51
- Label: TVT

TVT Records released the film's soundtrack album on Audio CD on November 26, 1996. It features only two of composer David Newman's pieces from Jingle All the Way, but features many of the songs by other artists included in the film, as well as other Christmas songs and new tracks by the Brian Setzer Orchestra. Intrada Music Group released a Special Collection limited edition of Newman's full 23-track score on November 3, 2008.

| No. | Title | Writer(s) | Artist | Length |
|---|---|---|---|---|
| 1. | "Jingle Bells" | James Pierpont | The Brian Setzer Orchestra | 2:18 |
| 2. | "So They Say It's Christmas" | Brian Setzer | Lou Rawls, The Brian Setzer Orchestra | 4:05 |
| 3. | "Sleigh Ride" | Leroy Anderson, Mitchell Parish | Darlene Love, The Brian Setzer Orchestra | 2:36 |
| 4. | "Run Rudolph Run" | Marvin Brodie, Johnny Marks | Chuck Berry | 2:44 |
| 5. | "It's the Most Wonderful Time of the Year" | Edward Pola, George Wyle | Johnny Mathis | 2:47 |
| 6. | "Merry Christmas Baby" | Lou Baxter, Johnny Moore | Charles Brown | 4:47 |
| 7. | "Back Door Santa" | Clarence Carter, Marcus Daniel | Clarence Carter | 2:09 |
| 8. | "The Christmas Song" | Mel Tormé, Robert Wells | Nat King Cole | 3:10 |
| 9. | "Jingle Bell Rock" | Joe Beal, Joseph Carleton Beal, Jim Boothe, James Ross Boothe | Bobby Helms | 2:12 |
| 10. | "Father and Son" | Calvin Massey, David Newman, Cat Stevens | David Newman | 3:00 |
| 11. | "Finale" | Geoffrey Burgon, Alfred Newman, Stephen Schwartz | David Newman | 4:02 |
| 12. | "Deep in the Heart of Christmas" | Sammy Hagar, Jesse Harms | The Brian Setzer Orchestra and Darlene Love | 2:52 |

== Release ==
=== Marketing ===
As Schwarzenegger only signed on for the film in February and the film was shot so quickly, only six and a half months were available for merchandising, instead of the ideal year. As such, merchandising was limited to a 13.5-inch replica $25 Talking Turbo Man action figure and the West Coast exclusive Turbo Man Time Racer vehicle, while no tie-in promotions could be secured. Despite this, several critics wrote that the film was only being made to sell the toy. Columbus dismissed this notion, stating that with only roughly 200,000 Turbo Man toys being made, the merchandising was far less than the year's other releases, such as Space Jam and 101 Dalmatians. The film's release coincided with the Tickle Me Elmo craze, in which high demand for the doll during the 1996 Christmas season led to store mobbing similar to that depicted for Turbo Man. The world premiere was held on November 16, 1996, at the Mall of America in Bloomington, where parts of the film were shot. A day of events was held to celebrate the film's release, and Schwarzenegger donated memorabilia from the film to the Mall's Planet Hollywood.

=== Home media ===
The film was released on VHS on October 28, 1997, and in November 1998 it was released on DVD. It was re-released on DVD in December 2004, followed by an extended director's cut in October 2007, known as the "Family Fun Edition". It contained several minutes of extra footage, as well as other DVD extras such as a behind-the-scenes featurette. In December of the following year, the Family Fun Edition was released on Blu-ray Disc.

=== Lawsuit ===
In 1998, Murray Hill Publishing sued 20th Century Fox for $150,000, claiming that the idea for the film was stolen from a screenplay they had purchased from high school teacher Brian Webster entitled Could This Be Christmas? They said the script had 36 similarities with Jingle All the Way, including the plot, dialogue and character names. Murray Hill President Bob Laurel bought the script from Webster in 1993, and sent it to Fox and other studios in 1994 but received no response and claimed the idea was copied by Kornfield, who was Fox's script reader. In 2001, Fox were found liable of copyright infringement and ordered to pay $19 million ($15 million in damages and $4 million in legal costs) to Murray Hill, with Webster to receive a portion. Laurel died a few months after the verdict, before receiving any of the money. On appeal, the damages figure was lowered to $1.5 million, before the verdict itself was quashed in 2004 after a judge decided the idea was not stolen, as Fox had bought Kornfield's screenplay before he or anybody else at Fox had read Could This Be Christmas?

== Reception ==
=== Box office ===
Opening on November 22, Jingle All the Way made $12.1 million in its first weekend, opening at #4 behind Star Trek: First Contact, Space Jam and Ransom; it went on to gross $129 million worldwide, recouping its $75 million budget in the first ten days of release. The film was released in the United Kingdom on December 6, 1996, and topped the country's box office that weekend.

=== Critical response ===
Despite its fairly entertaining buildup and somewhat serious commentary on materialism during the holidays, the end of the movie takes a realistic conceit and adds in comedy sci-fi elements. Not only does the movie take a turn for the cartoony, but the end is basically everybody laughing and learning their lesson, without any realistic resolution of the situation. It's as if the screenwriters couldn't figure an easy way out of Howard's situation, so they added in slapstick comedy and the ending from an episode of Full House.

— Mike Drucker

On the review aggregator website Rotten Tomatoes, 20% of 46 critics' reviews are positive, with an average rating of 4.4/10. The website's consensus reads: "Arnold Schwarzenegger tries his best, but Jingle All the Way suffers from an uneven tone, shifting wildly from a would-be satire on materialism to an antic, slapstick yuk-fest." Metacritic, which uses a weighted average, assigned the film a score of 34 out of 100, based on 23 critics, indicating "generally unfavorable" reviews. Audiences polled by CinemaScore gave the film an average grade of "B+" on an A+ to F scale.

Emanuel Levy felt the film "highly formulaic" and criticized Levant's direction as little more advanced than a television sitcom. Although he felt that the script did not provide sufficient opportunity for Hartman, Wilson and Conrad to give exceptional performances, he opined that "Schwarzenegger has developed a light comic delivery, punctuated occasionally by an ironic one-liner," while "Sinbad has good moments". Neil Jeffries of Empire disagreed, feeling Schwarzenegger to be "wooden" and Sinbad to be "trying desperately to be funnier than his hat" but praised Lloyd as the "saving grace" of the film.

The New York Times critic Janet Maslin felt the film lacked any real plot, failed in its attempt at satire, should have included Myron's only mentioned son and "mostly wasted" Hartman, while Levant's direction was "listless". Similarly, the BBC's Neil Smith criticized the film's script, its focus on the commercialization of Christmas, as well as Schwarzenegger's performance which shows "the comic timing of a dead moose," but singled out Hartman for praise. Chicago Tribune critic Michael Wilmington panned the film, wondering why the characters (primarily Howard) acted so illogically: "Howard Langston is supposed to be a successful mattress manufacturer, but the movie paints him as a hot-tempered buffoon without a sensible idea in his head." Jack Garner of USA Today condemned the film, finding it more "cynical" than satirical, stating "this painfully bad movie has been inspired strictly by the potential jingle of cash registers." He wrote of Levant's directorial failure as he "offers no ... sense of comic timing," while "pauses in the midst of much of the dialogue are downright painful." Trevor Johnston suggested that the film "seems to mark a point of decline in the Schwarzenegger career arc" and the anti-consumerism message largely failed, with "Jim Belushi's corrupt mall Santa with his stolen-goods warehouse ... provid[ing] the film's sole flash of dark humour."

IGN's Mike Drucker praised its subject matter as "one of the few holiday movies to directly deal with the commercialization of Christmas" although felt the last twenty minutes of the film let it down, as the first hour or so had "some family entertainment" value if taken with a "grain of salt". He concluded the film was "a member of the so-corny-its-good genre," while "Arnold delivers plenty of one-liners ripe for sound board crank callers." Jamie Malanowski of The New York Times praised the film's satirical premise but felt it was "full of unrealized potential" because "the filmmakers [wrongly] equate mayhem with humor." Roger Ebert gave the film two-and-a-half stars, writing that he "liked a lot of the movie", which he thought had "energy" and humor which would have mass audience appeal. He was, though, disappointed by "its relentlessly materialistic view of Christmas, and by the choice to go with action and (mild) violence over dialogue and plot." Kevin Carr of 7M Pictures concluded that while the film is not very good, as a form of family entertainment it is "surprisingly fun."

=== Accolades ===
| Award | Category | Subject | Result |
|---|---|---|---|
| Blockbuster Entertainment Award | Favorite Supporting Actor - Family | Sinbad | Won |
| Golden Camera Award | Best International Actor | Arnold Schwarzenegger | Won |
| Golden Raspberry Award | Worst Director | Brian Levant | Nominated |
| Stinkers Bad Movie Award | Most Painfully Unfunny Comedy | | Nominated |
| Stinkers Bad Movie Award | Worst Actor | Arnold Schwarzenegger | Nominated |
| Stinkers Bad Movie Award | Worst Supporting Actress | Rita Wilson | Nominated |

== Sequel ==
More than 18 years after the release of the original film, a stand-alone sequel, Jingle All the Way 2, was released straight-to-DVD in December 2014. Directed by Alex Zamm and produced by WWE Studios and 20th Century Fox, the film has a similar plot to the original, but is otherwise not connected and has none of the original cast or characters. The lead roles were instead played by Larry the Cable Guy and Santino Marella.

== See also ==
- List of Christmas films
- List of films featuring fictional films
- "Jingle Bells", popular traditional winter holiday song
