= Cleveland, Georgia =

- City
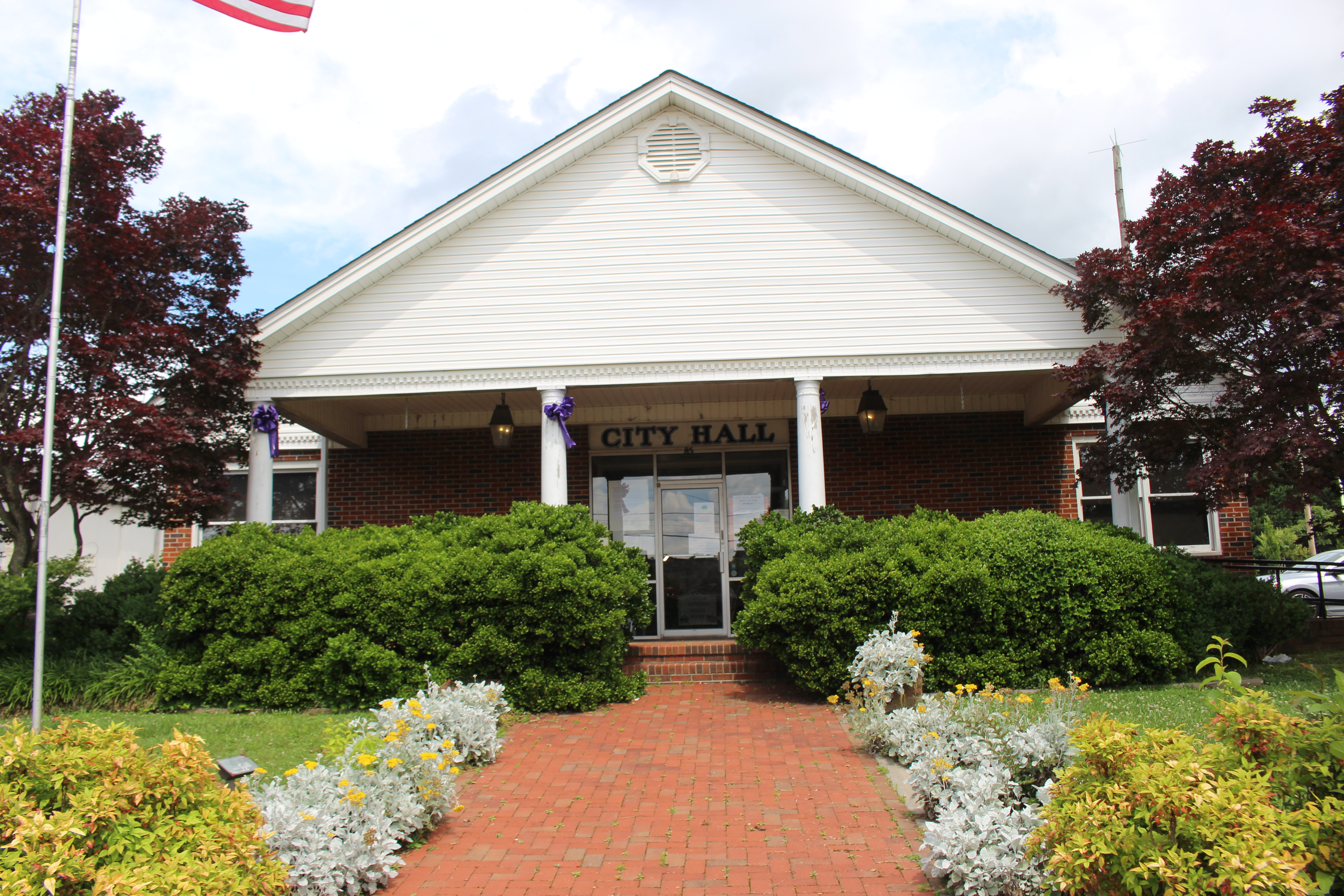
- Cleveland City Hall

- Seal Logo

- Location in White County, Georgia
- Coordinates: 34°35′47″N 83°45′50″W
- Country: United States
- State: Georgia
- County: White

Area
  - Total: 3.89 sq mi (10.07 km^{2})
  - Land: 3.87 sq mi (10.03 km^{2})
  - Water: 0.015 sq mi (0.04 km^{2})
- Elevation: 1,572 ft (479 m)

Population (2020)
  - Total: 3,514
  - Density: 1,075.1/sq mi (415.11/km^{2})
- Time zone: UTC-5 (Eastern (EST))
  - Summer (DST): UTC-4 (EDT)
- ZIP code: 30528
- Area code: 706
- FIPS code: 13-16824
- GNIS feature ID: 0355189
- Website: www.cityofclevelandga.org

Cleveland is a city in White County, Georgia, located 90 miles (140 km) northeast of Atlanta and 128 miles (206 km) southeast of Chattanooga, Tennessee. Its population was 3,514 at the 2020 census. It is the county seat of White County.

Cleveland is home to the North Georgia Zoo and Petting Farm, Farmhouse Coffee, and Babyland General Hospital, the "birthplace" of Cabbage Patch Kids dolls, as well as an adoption center for the dolls.

== History ==
Prior to 1883, Cleveland was named 'New Prospect', as far back as 1806 when Cleveland was first settled. After the formation of White County in 1857, it became the county seat for the county, being incorporated in 1870, before being renamed to Cleveland in 1883. The town was named after General Benjamin Cleveland, a War of 1812 figure and grandson of Colonel Benjamin Cleveland a Revolutionary War figure. After the arrival of a railroad in 1888, the population of Cleveland began to grow, and it was incorporated as a city in 1949.

== Geography ==
Cleveland is located at 34°35′47″N 83°45′50″W (34.596309, -83.763893).

According to the United States Census Bureau, it has a total area of 3.93 square miles (10.2 km^{2}), all land.

=== Climate ===
Climate data for Cleveland, Georgia, 1991–2020 normals, extremes 1972–present
Month	Jan	Feb	Mar	Apr	May	Jun	Jul	Aug	Sep	Oct	Nov	Dec	Year
Record high °F (°C)	76 (24)	77 (25)	86 (30)	88 (31)	91 (33)	101 (38)	102 (39)	98 (37)	94 (34)	95 (35)	83 (28)	77 (25)	102 (39)
Mean maximum °F (°C)	68.0 (20.0)	70.0 (21.1)	79.2 (26.2)	83.5 (28.6)	88.0 (31.1)	92.6 (33.7)	92.4 (33.6)	92.5 (33.6)	89.2 (31.8)	83.5 (28.6)	76.2 (24.6)	69.3 (20.7)	94.4 (34.7)
Mean daily maximum °F (°C)	50.3 (10.2)	53.6 (12.0)	61.4 (16.3)	70.1 (21.2)	76.6 (24.8)	82.7 (28.2)	85.8 (29.9)	84.5 (29.2)	79.8 (26.6)	71.3 (21.8)	61.6 (16.4)	53.4 (11.9)	69.3 (20.7)
Daily mean °F (°C)	38.8 (3.8)	41.7 (5.4)	48.2 (9.0)	56.2 (13.4)	63.9 (17.7)	71.3 (21.8)	74.8 (23.8)	73.8 (23.2)	68.4 (20.2)	58.1 (14.5)	48.2 (9.0)	41.3 (5.2)	57.1 (13.9)
Mean daily minimum °F (°C)	27.4 (−2.6)	29.8 (−1.2)	35.1 (1.7)	42.3 (5.7)	51.2 (10.7)	59.8 (15.4)	63.7 (17.6)	63.1 (17.3)	57.0 (13.9)	44.9 (7.2)	34.7 (1.5)	29.3 (−1.5)	44.9 (7.1)
Mean minimum °F (°C)	10.9 (−11.7)	15.7 (−9.1)	21.1 (−6.1)	28.5 (−1.9)	36.5 (2.5)	50.9 (10.5)	56.5 (13.6)	56.5 (13.6)	44.7 (7.1)	30.4 (−0.9)	20.9 (−6.2)	17.1 (−8.3)	9.6 (−12.4)
Record low °F (°C)	0 (−18)	5 (−15)	9 (−13)	21 (−6)	30 (−1)	40 (4)	50 (10)	50 (10)	37 (3)	21 (−6)	11 (−12)	1 (−17)	0 (−18)
Average precipitation inches (mm)	6.04 (153)	5.65 (144)	5.95 (151)	5.20 (132)	4.75 (121)	5.09 (129)	4.76 (121)	6.04 (153)	4.69 (119)	5.39 (137)	5.15 (131)	6.46 (164)	65.17 (1,655)
Average snowfall inches (cm)	0.5 (1.3)	0.4 (1.0)	0.0 (0.0)	0.0 (0.0)	0.0 (0.0)	0.0 (0.0)	0.0 (0.0)	0.0 (0.0)	0.0 (0.0)	0.0 (0.0)	0.0 (0.0)	0.2 (0.51)	1.1 (2.81)
Average precipitation days (≥ 0.01 in)	11.6	11.7	11.9	10.3	11.7	13.4	13.2	12.9	9.2	8.7	9.7	12.2	136.5
Average snowy days (≥ 0.1 in)	0.2	0.1	0.0	0.0	0.0	0.0	0.0	0.0	0.0	0.0	0.0	0.0	0.3
Source 1: NOAA
Source 2: National Weather Service (mean maxima/minima 2006–2020)

== Demographics ==
Historical population
Census	Pop.	Note	%±
1870	145		—
1880	197		35.9%
1920	339		—
1930	498		46.9%
1940	471		−5.4%
1950	589		25.1%
1960	657		11.5%
1970	1,353		105.9%
1980	1,578		16.6%
1990	1,653		4.8%
2000	1,907		15.4%
2010	3,410		78.8%
2020	3,514		3.0%
U.S. Decennial Census

=== 2020 census ===
As of the 2020 census, Cleveland had a population of 3,514. The median age was 29.4 years. 21.6% of residents were under the age of 18 and 15.8% of residents were 65 years of age or older. For every 100 females there were 82.1 males, and for every 100 females age 18 and over there were 77.3 males age 18 and over.

0.0% of residents lived in urban areas, while 100.0% lived in rural areas.

There were 1,226 households in Cleveland, of which 35.9% had children under the age of 18 living in them. Of all households, 35.3% were married-couple households, 16.3% were households with a male householder and no spouse or partner present, and 41.7% were households with a female householder and no spouse or partner present. About 31.8% of all households were made up of individuals and 17.1% had someone living alone who was 65 years of age or older.

There were 1,347 housing units, of which 9.0% were vacant. The homeowner vacancy rate was 2.1% and the rental vacancy rate was 5.4%.

Racial composition as of the 2020 census
Race	Number	Percent
White	2,854	81.2%
Black or African American	266	7.6%
American Indian and Alaska Native	29	0.8%
Asian	31	0.9%
Native Hawaiian and Other Pacific Islander	0	0.0%
Some other race	103	2.9%
Two or more races	231	6.6%
Hispanic or Latino (of any race)	179	5.1%

=== 2010 census ===
At the 2010 census, the population was 3,410.

=== 2000 census ===
As of the census of 2000, there were 1,907 people, 729 households, and 468 families residing in the city. The population density was 602.7 inhabitants per square mile (232.7/km^{2}). There were 808 housing units at an average density of 255.4 per square mile (98.6/km^{2}). The racial makeup of the city was 86.58% White, 10.70% African American, 0.26% Native American, 0.31% Asian, 0.05% Pacific Islander, 0.73% from other races, and 1.36% from two or more races. Hispanic or Latino of any race were 1.99% of the population.

There were 729 households, out of which 27.6% had children under the age of 18 living with them, 43.5% were married couples living together, 17.3% had a female householder with no husband present, and 35.8% were non-families. 31.6% of all households were made up of individuals, and 15.0% had someone living alone who was 65 years of age or older. The average household size was 2.29 and the average family size was 2.84.

In the city, the population was spread out, with 19.9% under the age of 18, 21.8% from 18 to 24, 22.4% from 25 to 44, 20.0% from 45 to 64, and 15.9% who were 65 years of age or older. The median age was 32 years. For every 100 females, there were 85.1 males. For every 100 females age 18 and over, there were 79.2 males.

The median income for a household in the city was $31,949, and the median income for a family was $37,417. Males had a median income of $27,500 versus $21,676 for females. The per capita income for the city was $14,801. About 12.4% of families and 15.5% of the population were below the poverty line, including 25.6% of those under age 18 and 11.4% of those age 65 or over.

== Education ==
=== White County School District ===
The White County School District holds pre-school to grade twelve, and consists of four elementary schools, a middle school, and a high school. The district has 233 full-time teachers and over 3,758 students.

=== Truett McConnell University ===
Truett McConnell University is a private, Christian, coeducational liberal arts college in Cleveland. It is affiliated with the Georgia Baptist Convention, and controlled by a board of trustees elected by the convention. The college was named to honor George W. Truett and Fernando C. McConnell.

== Culture ==
The town is home to two Jewish summer camps, Camp Barney Medintz (under the auspices of the Marcus Jewish Community Center of Atlanta) and URJ Camp Coleman (under the auspices of the Union for Reform Judaism).

The town is also home to two Christian summer camps, Strong Rock Camp and Retreat and Woodlands Camp.

Travelers pass through the town on their way to other destinations just a few miles away, such as the Bavarian-themed town of Helen, Unicoi State Park, the Smithgall Woods-Dukes Creek Conservation Area, and the Chattahoochee National Forest, including Anna Ruby Falls.

== Notable people ==
- Alton Brown, Food Network personality
- Billy Lothridge, NFL player
- Xavier Roberts, creator of Cabbage Patch Kids
