= Cabbage Patch riots =

Civil unrest

The Cabbage Patch riots were a series of violent customer outbursts at several retail stores in the United States in the fall and winter of 1983. The Cabbage Patch Kids toy line was in tremendous demand, and in 1982 Cabbage Patch's parent company Coleco was the best performer on the New York Stock Exchange, rising from $6.87 to $36.75 per share. Most stores at the time typically stocked only between two and five hundred of the product, and with thousands of customers surging the stores, attempting to obtain one of the dolls, many fought with other customers to obtain one.

The holiday season of 1983 saw several violent occurrences in such major retail stores as Sears, JCPenney, Montgomery Ward and Macy's. In smaller retail stores, such as the now-defunct Kmart and Zayre, retailers attempted to control crowds by handing out "purchase tickets" to the first several hundred customers, leaving hundreds, if not thousands, empty-handed after standing in line for several hours. In Milwaukee, radio DJs jokingly announced that a B-29 bomber would drop Cabbage Patch Kids dolls at County Stadium, which prompted two dozen people to follow their facetious instructions to stand in the −2 °F (−19 °C) wind chill holding catcher's mitts and American Express cards.

Reports of violence included hitting, shoving, and trampling, as well as some customers attacking others with weapons such as baseball bats in order to obtain a Cabbage Patch Doll. By 1984, with more supply of the dolls and demand dropping, violence declined.

It was not clear why the "homely" dolls were so intensely desired. A Time article featured a theory from a doctor that "most children between the ages of six and twelve fantasize that they were really adopted", which made it appealing to experience the adoption fantasy through the dolls, which came with birth certificates and adoption papers.

The Cabbage Patch riots foreshadowed subsequent holiday toy crazes, such as for the Tickle Me Elmo doll in 1996 and Furby in 1998. The riots also inspired the plot of the 1996 Christmas film, Jingle All the Way.
