= Bernard O'Shea =

Irish comedian

- Born: Bernard Kendrick O'Shea; Durrow, County Laois, Ireland
- Notable work: TJ and TJ, Breakfast with Bernard and Keith, Republic of Telly, Bridget & Eamon, Breakfast Republic

Bernard O'Shea is an Irish comedian from Durrow, County Laois, Ireland. He co-hosted RTÉ 2FM's Breakfast Republic with Jennifer Zamparelli and Keith Walsh. He came to national attention on the satirical sketch TV show Republic of Telly.

O'Shea started in entertainment at an early age, playing traditional Irish music and touring Europe with several groups. At college he studied theatre and starred in several theatrical productions. He worked in the National Theatre of Ireland, the Abbey Theatre. He won the Harp Newcomer Comedy Award in 2000 and performed in the BBC Newcomer Awards the same year. He was chosen to perform in the Montreal Just for Laughs comedy festival in 2005 and also The Kilkenny Cat Laughs festival in 2005 and 2006. He wrote TJ and TJ sketches on Today FM.

== Television credits ==
- The Liffey Laugh (RTÉ)
- Naked Camera (RTÉ)
- Just for Laughs
- The World Stands Up (Paramount)
- Newcomer Awards (BBC)
- Touching People (RTÉ)
- The Byrne Ultimatum (RTÉ)
- Republic of Telly (RTÉ)
- Bridget & Eamon (RTÉ)
- Barry and the Boys (RTÉ)
