= Bridget & Eamon =

Irish television series

- Genre: Sitcom
- Written by: Jason Butler; Bernard O'Shea; Jennifer Zamparelli
- Directed by: Jason Butler
- Starring: Jennifer Zamparelli; Bernard O'Shea; Norma Sheahan; Edwin Sammon; Sharon Mannion; Colum McDonnell; Eleanor Tiernan
- Opening theme: " Why?" by Bronski Beat
- Country of origin: Ireland
- No. of seasons: 4
- No. of episodes: 24 + 3 Christmas specials

Production
- Executive producers: Bernard O'Shea; Jennifer Zamparelli
- Producer: Jason Butler
- Cinematography: Eleanor Bowman
- Editors: Bob Caldwell; John Phillipson
- Running time: 25 minutes
- Production company: Pure Class Productions

Original release
- Network: RTÉ Two
- Release: 1 February 2016

Bridget & Eamon is an Irish sitcom that first aired on RTÉ Two on 1 February 2016. It is based on the Bridget & Eamon sketches written by Shane Mulvey that featured on the Republic of Telly comedy review show. The show centres on 1980s husband and wife played by Bernard O'Shea and Jennifer Zamparelli.

The show won the IFTA for Best Comedy at the IFTA GALA Television 2016 awards. The show's director Jason Butler also won the IFTA for Best Director Soap / Comedy.

It was the first comedy funded entirely by the Irish state broadcaster RTÉ to screen in Britain.

It is produced with the support of investment incentives for the Irish Film Industry provided by the Government of Ireland, and filmed on location in Ireland.

== Plot ==
Bridget and Eamon are an unhappily married 1980s Irish couple. They live in the Irish Midlands with their 6 to 8 children.

== Cast ==
=== Main cast ===
- Jennifer Maguire as Bridget
- Bernard O'Shea as Eamon
- Edwin Sammon as Father Gabriel
- Norma Sheahan as Noreen
- Sharon Mannion as Concepta
- Laura O'Mahony as Grainne
- Eleanor Tiernan as Dolores
- Colum McDonnell as Frank
- Neil Molloy as Garda Paul
- Danny Kehoe as Garda Ger
- John Colleary as Jimmy
- Patrick McDonnell as Martin
- Kevin Barry as Donal
- Keith Walsh as Phelim

== Episodes ==
=== Season 1 ===
No. in season	Title	Directed by	Written by	Original release date
1	"The Trócaire Box"	Jason Butler	Jennifer Maguire, Jason Butler & Bernard O'Shea	1 February 2016
Eamon always spends the money from the Trócaire box so Fr. Gabriel is keeping an eye on him this year. Bridget hosts a Tupperware party that goes disastrously wrong when illegal condoms are delivered instead. She and Eamon become successful at selling them, and travel to Northern Ireland to buy more. They make over £37,000, which they store in Trócaire boxes. Fr. Gabriel takes the boxes of cash.
2	"The Divorce Referendum"	Jason Butler	Jennifer Maguire, Jason Butler & Bernard O'Shea	8 February 2016
The couple are chosen to be on the poster for the no campaign for the forthcoming divorce referendum, but Feilim returns home from the United States to tell them that he is divorced.
3	"The Lottery"	Jason Butler	Jennifer Maguire, Jason Butler & Bernard O'Shea	15 February 2016
Winning the National Lottery would be the answer to the couple's financial troubles. However, Bridget is unhappy when the syndicate they form with their neighbours wins, because she did not buy the ticket.
4	"The Job"	Jason Butler	Jennifer Maguire, Jason Butler & Bernard O'Shea	22 February 2016
When Eamon loses his job, Bridget must get her first one ever. Eamon accidentally joins a small group of men whom he is unaware are an IRA cell.
5	"The Last Day of the Cigarettes"	Jason Butler	Jennifer Maguire, Jason Butler & Bernard O'Shea	7 March 2016
The television can now receive British channels. When the TV licence inspector appears at the door, Bridget puts the house into lockdown. Bridget becomes very angry when she runs out of cigarettes.
6	"The La-sag-ne"	Jason Butler	Jennifer Maguire, Jason Butler & Bernard O'Shea	29 February 2016
Bridget is a finalist in the Housewife of the Year competition, and Eamon goes to extreme lengths to maximise her chance of winning.

=== Season 2 ===
No. in season	Title	Directed by	Written by	Original release date
1	"New Best Friends"	Jason Butler	Jennifer Maguire, Jason Butler & Bernard O'Shea	14 November 2016
Bridget and Eamon befriend visiting American couple Barbara and Mikey. They wrongly believe the Americans to be swingers.
2	"The Election"	Jason Butler	Jennifer Maguire, Jason Butler & Bernard O'Shea	21 November 2016
Eamon runs for the local election helped by Billy the builder, but when Bridget runs against Eamon, the battle between husband and wife becomes personal.
3	"The Salon"	Jason Butler	Jennifer Maguire, Jason Butler & Bernard O'Shea	28 November 2016
Eamon cuts Bridget's hair and she is very pleased with the result. She sets up a salon in the Good Room. Her friends visit to have their hair cut by Eamon, ignoring Bridget.
4	"Who Called?"	Jason Butler	Jennifer Maguire, Jason Butler & Bernard O'Shea	5 December 2016
When Bridget and Eamon miss a phone call, they scramble to find out who it was from before the news spreads out of control.
5	"The Moving Statue"	Jason Butler	Jennifer Maguire, Jason Butler & Bernard O'Shea	12 December 2016
The couple start a lucrative business when the holy statue in their front room begins to move every hour, but Father Gabriel doubts that it is a genuine miracle.
6	"The Irish Summer"	Jason Butler	Jennifer Maguire, Jason Butler & Bernard O'Shea	19 December 2016
The sun is out. The Irish summer has started and it will not last, so Bridget and Eamon get out there fast...using cooking oil as suntan lotion.
7	"Bridget & Eamon's Christmas Special"	Jason Butler	Jennifer Maguire, Jason Butler & Bernard O'Shea	24 December 2016
2016 Christmas Special. On Saint Stephen's Day, Eamon's mother arrives to make her daughter-in-law's life even more miserable. Bridget accidentally cuts her neck with an electric carving knife, then deliberately cuts her neck with it a few more times, killing her. She becomes a zombie.

=== Season 3 ===
No. in season	Title	Directed by	Written by	Original release date
1	"Where There's a Will..."	Jason Butler	Jennifer Maguire, Jason Butler & Bernard O'Shea	19 September 2017
Bridget's mother has a new Turkish boyfriend who is 32 years younger than she. She tells Bridget that she is rewriting her will in favour of her boyfriend, so Eamon makes him leave by using a turd on a stick. Eamon reveals to Bridget and her mother that he has been in love with her mother since before he married Bridget.
2	"The Radio Station"	Jason Butler	Jennifer Maguire, Jason Butler & Bernard O'Shea	26 September 2017
Bridget and Eamon take over the airwaves when they start a pirate radio station in their front room.
3	"The Camogie Team"	Jason Butler	Jennifer Maguire, Jason Butler & Bernard O'Shea	3 October 2017
Bridget has joined the local camogie team. Soon after, jealous Eamon joins – badly disguised as a woman.
4	"The Video Shop"	Jason Butler	Jennifer Maguire, Jason Butler & Bernard O'Shea	10 October 2017
Eamon has got a VHS video cassette recorder. The whole town want to rent it off him, but he and Bridget try to satisfy the demand for films by opening a video shop. There is a lot of demand for blue movies, so the couple decide to make one, despite not knowing what they are.
5	"The Census"	Jason Butler	Jennifer Maguire, Jason Butler & Bernard O'Shea	17 October 2017
Bridget's job with the census gives her information to blackmail half the town, but Eamon has bigger ideas. Some of the neighbours find out that the couple are second cousins, but they say that is common knowledge, and they were granted dispensation to marry in a Catholic church.
6	"The Trip to Lourdes"	Jason Butler	Jennifer Maguire, Jason Butler & Bernard O'Shea	24 October 2017
There are two free seats on the bus to Lourdes, but how far will Bridget go to make sure she gets to go this year? All she is missing is someone who needs to be cured. Bridget beats Eamon up, making him eligible.
7	"Eamon's Last Christmas"	Jason Butler	Jennifer Maguire, Jason Butler & Bernard O'Shea	28 December 2017
2017 Christmas Special. Bridget works out that with the widow's pension and life insurance, Eamon would be worth more dead than alive.

=== Season 4 ===
No. in season	Title	Directed by	Written by	Original release date
1	"The Musical Society"	Jason Butler	Jennifer Maguire, Jason Butler & Bernard O'Shea	24 December 2018
2018 Christmas Special. Held at gun point by paramilitaries Jimmy and Martin, and with their TV broken and house surrounded Bridget, Eamon and their neighbours must act out popular TV shows to keep the IRA entertained and stay alive. They might just get away with it as long as Jimmy doesn't ask them to perform "Dirty Dancing"...
2	"Pints, Fights & Poetry"	Jason Butler	Jennifer Maguire, Jason Butler & Bernard O'Shea	10 January 2019
To prove he's not "no craic" Eamon gets his 70s rock band back together for a gig. Bridget accuses Eamon on being no craic in front of everyone – the single worst thing you can say about any Irish person. So when Maurice Mallumphy the lead singer of Eamon's celtic beat poetry rock band from the 70s shows up in town, Eamon gets the band back together to prove he's is still craic after all. But Bridget and Maurice seem to have history and the oldest kid has more than a passing resemblance to Maurice. On the day of the big gig will Eamon finally figure out what's right in front of his eyes?..
3	"The Home Brew"	Jason Butler	Jennifer Maguire, Jason Butler & Bernard O'Shea	17 January 2019
When Eamon and by association Bridget are barred from the pub, Eamon decides to cook up his own home brew poitín based on an old family recipe. The recipe seems to be nothing more than white spirits and rat poison so when all the neighbours sample it they’re snapped out of the drunken stupor by the fact the dog is dead. The dog drank some of the home brew 12 hours before them. So they’ve only got 12 hours left to live. What are they going to do with the little time they have left? Apart from a very disappointing orgy or three, nobody can think of anything or wants to do anything. Until Eamon convinces them not to leave any money for their kids and instead blow their collective savings on getting Foster & Allen to play in the front room.
4	"The Dating Agency"	Jason Butler	Jennifer Maguire, Jason Butler & Bernard O'Shea	24 January 2019
Frank is Eamon’s only friend but from Eamon’s perspective Frank won’t leave him alone. The ad for a Dating Agency in the Parish Newsletter gives them the opportunity to hopefully get Frank married so he can stop bothering Eamon. Although Fr Gabriel’s Dating Agency initially pairs Frank up with Eamon. In truth they are a perfect match. After a complaint he’s eventually paired up for a blind date with Alexis. Bridget and Eamon train Frank for his first date and though it appears there’ll be no hope for Frank, he comes back from the first date engaged and asking Eamon to be his best man. Shite! Eamon doesn’t want to be anyone’s best man and jealous of Frank’s happiness, and his beautiful and caring financé, Bridget and Eamon plan to break them up. With the help of an obliging auld dear and some cabbage soup and old people urine they tempt Frank into destroying his own nuptials. Success! Except Frank’s on his own again and back wanting to hang out with Eamon.
5	"The Vase"	Jason Butler	Jennifer Maguire, Jason Butler & Bernard O'Shea	31 January 2019
When Bridget and Eamon witness the same vase as they have in their house be valued for £1 million on Antique Roadshow it sparks off a bitter fight between them, Bridget’s Mother and Fr Gabriel for who actually owns The Vase. Each of them tells their version of the story of how they came to own it, coincidentally on the same night as Bridget’s debs when Eamon proposed to her back in the 1970s. Guest star: Deirdre O’Kane as Bridget’s Mother
6	"The Imposter"	Jason Butler	Jennifer Maguire, Jason Butler & Bernard O'Shea	7 February 2019
Bridget is practically invisible to everyone especially Eamon so it’s not surprising that when Bridget is in hospital Eamon mistakes the little woman Betty at the front door as his wife. Bridget must make her way back home in an epic journey and then prove to everyone that Betty is the imposter and she’s the real Bridget via a recreation of a popular TV game show. But when it comes down to a matter of life or death for Eamon will he finally acknowledge Bridget? Guest stars: Mary Murray as Betty and Jason Byrne as the Bus Driver
7	"The Alien"	Jason Butler	Jennifer Maguire, Jason Butler & Bernard O'Shea	14 February 2019
Bridget’s inability to keep a secret has just cost Eamon £13.50 a week in false claims but when a strange woman Veronica moves in as a lodger the hole in the household finances is filled. Veronica, though, is acting suspiciously like one of the Visitors in the TV Sci-fi mini series Bridget and Eamon are obsessed with. They confront Veronica who reveals she is an alien… an illegal alien from Russia. To keep the £13.50 a week rent Eamon will have to make Bridget keep her mouth shut for once. Featuring: Amy De Bhrún as Veronica
