= Damo and Ivor =

Irish comedy duo

- Notable work: Republic of Telly; Damo and Ivor

Comedy career
- Years active: 2011–2018
- Medium: Television
- Genre: Character comedy
- Members: Andrew Quirke

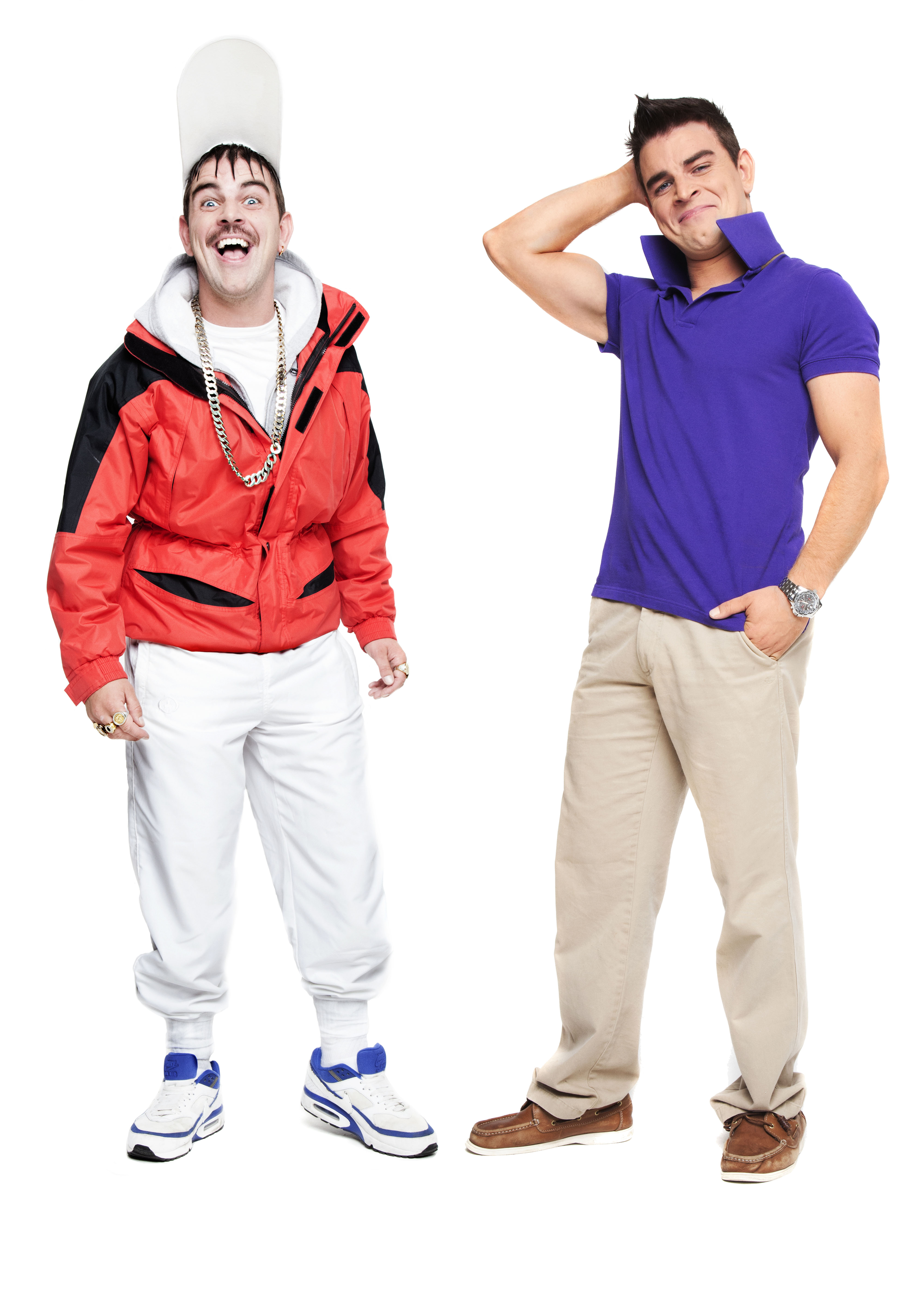
Actor Andy Quirke in the roles of Damo and Ivor

Damo and Ivor was a comedy duo act from Ireland, composed of two contrasting Dublin stereotypes, both portrayed by Andrew Quirke. The characters first appeared on bebo and YouTube - most notably in 'Skanger Me Banger(sic)'in late 2007/early 2008 and first on television in RTE's, Republic of Telly in 2011. Their musical parody, "Everybody's Drinkin'" debuted at sixth position in the Irish Singles Chart in April 2011 after the music video was shown on the programme. On 16 September 2013 their television show, Damo and Ivor debuted on RTÉ Two.

== Description ==
Damo Whelan and Ivor Itchdaddy are caricatures played by Andrew 'Andy' Quirke who takes on the twin personas of skanger Damo and D4 Ivor. The characters represent the northside-southside Dublin divide. The character of Damo, a colloquialism of the names Damon, Damian, or Damien originated in a Bebo video called Skanger me Banger, a satire of the MTV show Pimp My Ride, set in inner city Dublin.

== Cast ==
- Andy Quirke as Damo Whelan, Ivor Itchdaddy
- Ruth McCabe as Grano
- Lewis Magee as Spuddy
- Alan Ford as Edward Itchdaddy
- Norma Sheahan as Victoria Itchdaddy
- Rik Mayall as Alister Itchdaddy
- Eimear Morrissey as Tracey Rooney
- Hannah Crowley as Sarah-Jane
- Paul Roe as Flemo
- Enda Oates as Garda PJ
- Rory Fleck Byrne as Liam Delaney
- Francis Magee as Bricko
- Jules Coll as DJ Deirdre
- Graeme Singleton as Lockjaw Jason
- Tom O'Mahony as Tarquin
- David Crowley as Oisin
- Damien Kearney as Garda Fergal

== Production ==
=== Development ===
The song and video, "Everybody's Drinkin'" debuted on Republic of Telly, a TV review and magazine programme on Irish public broadcaster, RTÉ Two. This was aided by the video, which cost €2,470 to make, going viral on YouTube and gaining over 70,000 hits in under a week. The song which is a double-pronged attack on Dublin drinking culture resembles David Guetta's "Sexy Chick" and tells the story of a raucous night out from characters on both sides of the social divide. It features two contrasting Dublin stereotypes, which ends in each "getting shitfaced". It debuted at number six in the Irish Charts in April 2011 and has been compared to The Rubberbandits' "Horse Outside" which was also featured on Republic of Telly.

"Big Box Little Box" is the second single released by Damo and Ivor, released on 24 October 2011. It's the second released by the duo, from their album Epic Choons. A music video for the song was released on 23 October 2011, gaining over 1.7 million views.

=== Commissioning ===
After the positive reception of Damo and Ivor on Republic of Telly, RTÉ Two commissioned a television show based on the duo. It follows the story of the identical twin brothers who were separated after birth. Their mother, unable to look after both of them, sells Ivor to a wealthy family in Foxrock, Dublin, while Damo is raised by his grandmother. Damo and Ivor began airing 16 September 2013 on RTÉ Two.

=== Lawsuit ===
Irish singer-songwriter Damien O'Regan tried to sue the national broadcaster and Andrew Quirke for alleged copyright infringement over their use of the name "Damo" in the television show Damo and Ivor several days before it was set to air. He claimed he registered the name "Damo" with the Irish Patent Office several years beforehand and believed the infringement would damage the goodwill he had spent years building. He brought his case to the Irish High Court and requested an injunction. The show aired as planned and the case was dropped with O'Regan agreeing to waive any entitlements or rights to the name "Damo" as part of the Damo and Ivor concept.

== Reception ==
"Everybody's Drinkin'" has attracted some criticism with Michael O'Doherty of the Evening Herald calling it an "expensively produced, booze-sodden, bikini model-infested video homage to binge-drinking." The Irish National Parents Council Post Primary said: "The implication of this behaviour is being trivialised and glamorised without any cognisance of the danger to the lives of our young people" while Fionnuala Sheehan, chief executive of Drink Aware is quoted as saying "We are concerned about trends such as these because, the more people are exposed to images of excessive drinking, the more they normalise such behaviour."

== Discography ==
=== Albums ===
Album title	Album details	Chart positions
Album title	Album details	IRL
Epic Choons	Release Date: 4 November 2011; Label: Skanger Records; Format: CD, digital download	31

=== Singles ===
Year	Title	Peak chart position	Album
Year	Title	IRL	Album
2011	"Everybody's Drinkin'"	6	Epic Choons
2011	"Big Box Little Box'"	26	Epic Choons
2011	"Thank God It's Christmas'"	—	Epic Choons
2012	"Maniac 2012'"	4	Epic Choons
2012	"Horny'"	—	Epic Choons
"—" denotes releases that did not chart.

== See also ==
- The Rubberbandits
- Ross O'Carroll-Kelly
