= Ruth McCabe =

Irish actress

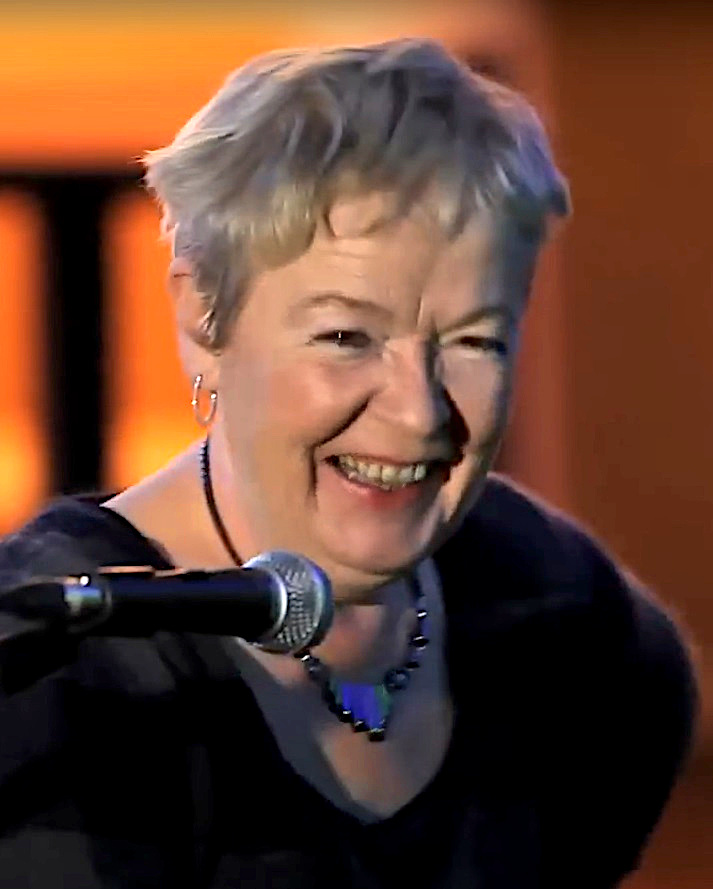
Ruth McCabe at JDIFF 2013

Ruth McCabe is an Irish stage, screen and voice actress known from Clones, County Monaghan. She is known for starring as Kay Curley in Stephen Frears' The Snapper, Christy Brown's paramour Mary in My Left Foot, and Wyn Ryan, sister of Dr. Sam Ryan, in three seasons of Silent Witness. She originated the role of Kay McCoy, proprietor of McCoy's bar in RTÉ's soap opera Fair City.

== Awards and recognition ==
McCabe won the inaugural IFTA in 2003 for Best Actress in a Supporting role, for playing Margaret McCutcheon in BBC One Northern Ireland's Any Time Now, and again in 2011, for her role as Eithne Driscoll in the Irish police series Single-Handed.

== Personal life ==
Ruth's father was Irish playwright and screenwriter Eugene McCabe.

McCabe took a break from acting to raise her first child, but performed in the one-woman play "The Worm in the Heart" while pregnant with her second child.

== Filmography ==
- Small Town, Big Story (TV Series) 2024
- That They Might Face the Rising Sun 2023
- Aisha Mrs. Keegan 2022
- Joyride Noreen 2022
- Women on the Verge (TV series) Aunty Bronagh 2018
- Damo and Ivor:The Movie 2018
- Victoria & Abdul Mrs. Tuck 2017
- Damo and Ivor (TV Series) Grano 2013–14
- Life of Crime (TV series) (TV Series) Rose Woods 2013
- Run & Jump Conor's mother 2013
- Foyle's War (episode: "The Cage") 2013
- Lucan (Mini series) Nanny Roberts 2013
- Philomena Mother Barbara 2013
- Wake Wood Peggy O'Shea 2009
- Single-Handed (TV Series) Eithne Driscoll 2007–10
- The Street (TV Series, 1 episode "Sean & Yvonne") Mary2006
- Breakfast on Pluto Ma Braden 2005
- Inside I'm Dancing Annie 2004
- The Blackwater Lightship Dr. Louise 2004
- An Everlasting Piece Mrs. O'Neill 2001
- Sinners (TV Movie) 2002
- The Closer You Get/American Women Mary Mulligan 2001
- Wild About Harry Lily 2000
- Relative Strangers (Mini Series) 1999
- Talk of Angels O'Toole 1998
- Silent Witness (TV Series) Wyn Ryan 1996–98
- Crossroads of Laredo (short) Barbara 1995
- Circle of Friends Emily Mahon 1995
- Takin' Over the Asylum (TV Series) Rosalie Gerrity 1994
- The Snapper Kay Curley 1993
- Hostages Elaine Spence 1992
- Fair City (TV Series) Kay McCoy 1989–1992
- My Left Foot Mary 1989

== Theatre work ==
- The Blackwater Lightship, Dora, Draíocht Arts Centre, County Dublin 2022
- Breathless Smock Alley Theatre 2014
- Ribbons by Elaine Murphy, Glenda, Peacock Theatre, Dublin 2013
- The New Electric Ballroom Druid production, St. Ann's Warehouse, Brooklyn, 2009
- The House of Bernarda Alba Poncia, Abbey Theatre 2003
- Prayers of Sherkin by Sebastian Barry, Peacock Theatre 1990
- The Worm in The Heart by Nell McCafferty, One woman play, Project Arts Centre, Temple Bar 1987
