= Martha Nelson Thomas =

American folk artist

Martha Nelson Thomas (born Martha Marie Nelson, November 29, 1950 – May 26, 2013) was an American folk artist, known for her work in soft sculpture. Thomas was the creator of "Doll Babies," the inspiration for Cabbage Patch Kids.

== Biography ==
Martha Nelson was born in Princeton, Kentucky, to Ralph and Ernestine Nelson. When she was an infant, her family moved to Mayfield, Kentucky. She graduated from the Louisville School of Art. She married Tucker Thomas on October 10, 1981, and they had three children Seth, Carl and Mara. Martha was the sister of Louisville-based stone carver Albert Nelson (1949–2021).

In 1971, while a student, Thomas began experimenting with soft sculpture in the form of dolls. She designed her "Doll Babies" with input from children she knew, made them by hand, and sold them at craft fairs around Louisville, Kentucky.

In 1976, Thomas met Xavier Roberts at one of the fairs. He asked her to supply him with dolls to sell in Georgia, where he lived and worked. Thomas briefly let him sell her Doll Babies, but stopped because she was concerned he might take her idea away from her. Roberts created his own version in 1978, and in 1982 he licensed the dolls to Coleco for mass-production under the name Cabbage Patch Kids.

In 1979, Thomas filed her first suit against Roberts. By 1983, she was seeking $1 million in damages from Roberts. In 1984, the case was settled out of court for an undisclosed amount. Around that time, while Cabbage Patch Kids were so popular that buyers had to join a nine-month waiting list, Thomas sold a line of craft items through Fibre-Craft, based on her original Doll Babies, that allowed buyers to sew up their own doll. While Cabbage Patch Kids were selling for $30 to $150, Thomas's Doll Babies supplies cost about $16 total.

After the court case Thomas continued to create art throughout her life. Some of her projects included making toys based on her children's drawings and making toys using socks. She and her family sold those creations at local craft fairs. She was also committed to fostering a love of art in children, and was an artist in residence at her children's elementary school, as well as conducting workshops with the local Girl Scout Chapter and other organizations.

Thomas died in Louisville, Kentucky on May 26, 2013, of ovarian cancer.

Her work has been exhibited at the High Museum of Art.
