= Housewife of the Year =

Annual contest in Ireland, 1967–1995

Housewife of the Year was an annual contest for housewives in Ireland between 1967 and 1995. In later years, it was renamed to Homemaker of the Year.

== Contest ==
Candidates were judged on the basis of "cookery, nurturing and basic household management skills."

A series of regional heats produced six finalists. The main task in the final was cooking a meal for four within a two-hour period. The host would then interview the contestants, with personality, appearance, sense of humour, interests and civic spirit all taken into account by the judges. Contestants would also list achievements, such as charity work.

== History ==
The first event was held in the Shelbourne Hotel on 4 November 1968. Among the judges were Frances Condell, former Mayor of Limerick, and athlete Noel Carroll. Brendan O'Reilly of RTÉ hosted the 1969 contest.

In 1972 it was incorporated into the Irish Food Fair in the Mansion House, Dublin.

It was first televised in 1982, with Gay Byrne hosting and The Fureys and Davey Arthur performing. In 1992 a spin-off show was produced, Calor Housewives' Cookery, where past winners and participants showcased recipes. It was last televised in 1994 and cancelled in 1996, to be succeeded for a few years by the Centra Homemaker of the Year.

Some winners parlayed their success in further celebrity and business success, most notably the 1990 winner, Margaret Browne (1954/55–2010; Killeagh, County Cork), who ran Ballymakeigh Country House and later the Green Barn Lifestyle Store Garden Centre and Restaurant, wrote a cookbook (Through My Kitchen Window) and regularly appeared on Derek Mooney's radio show. She argued for the need to advance the status of women in agriculture: "a woman must be paid as a staff member for the work she does. That way, women will have the recognition that they deserve."

== List of events ==
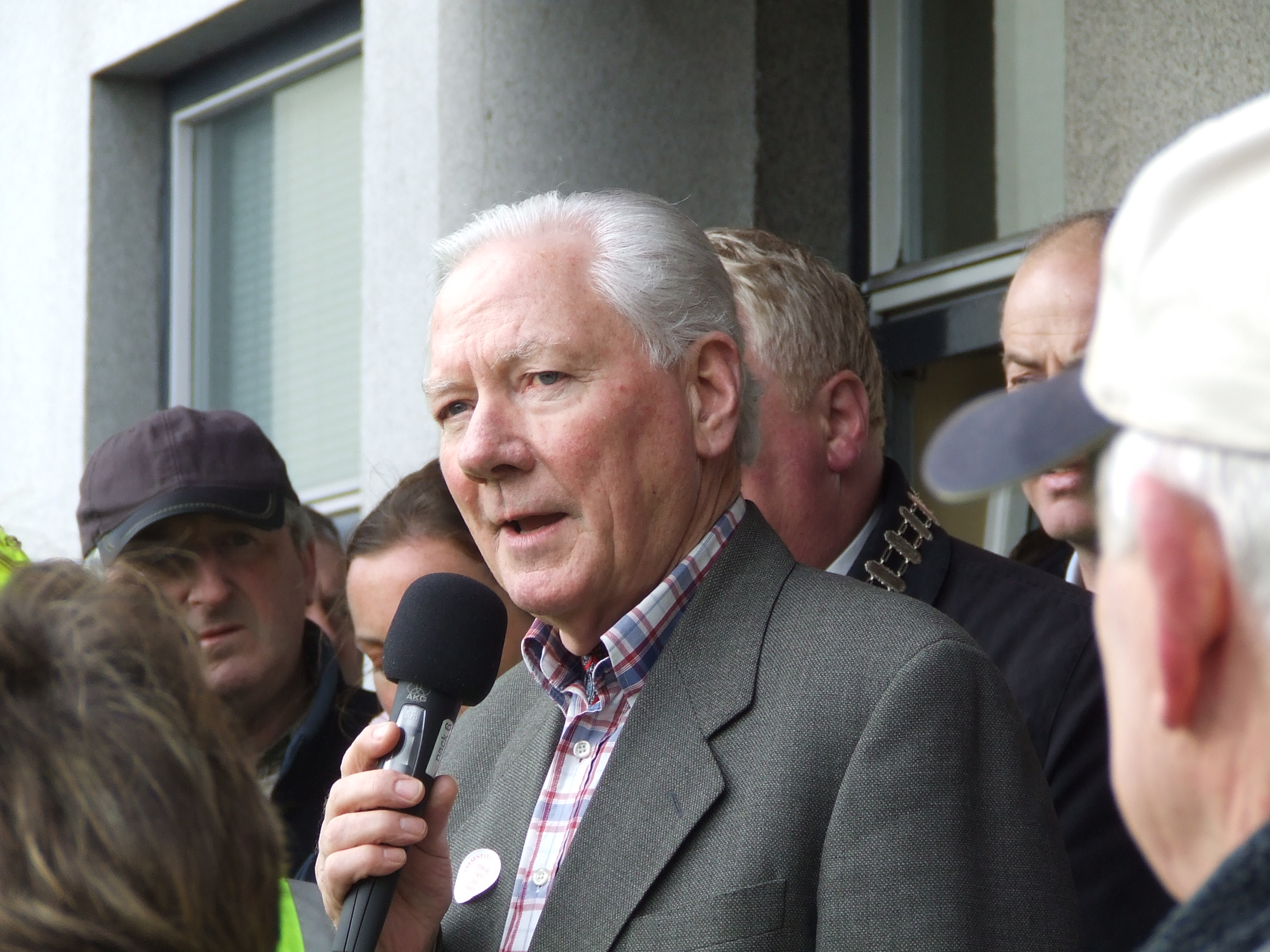
Gay Byrne, host in the 1980s and 90s

Year	Venue	Winner
1967		Kay Johnson, Drumcollogher
1968	Shelbourne Hotel, Dublin	Sylvia Nagle, Killavullen
1969	Shelbourne Hotel	Mrs McStay, Ballyfermot
1970		
1971	Shelbourne Hotel	Mrs. Mary P. O'Connor, Fermoy
1972		Jane Kelly, Claremorris
1973		
1974		
1975	Jury's Hotel, Ballsbridge	Freda Rooney, Rosses Point
1976		
1977		
1978	Burlington Hotel, Dublin	Margaret Carmody, Skibbereen
1979	Burlington Hotel, Dublin	Ann Foley, New Ross, Co. Wexford
1980	Gresham Hotel, Dublin	Dymphna Horgan, Killarney, Co.Kerry
1981		Regina Brennan, Ballybrack
1982	Burlington Hotel, Dublin	Mary Fitzgerald, Mungret, Co. Limerick
1983		Sheila Rohan, Castlegregory, Co.Kerry
1984	Burlington Hotel, Dublin	Mary Holleran, Clonbur
1985		
1986	National Concert Hall	Curry,
1987	National Concert Hall	Hilda Sheridan, Aughnacliffe
1988	Olympia Theatre, Dublin	Catherine Walsh
1989	Olympia Theatre, Dublin	Margaret Witherow, Convoy
1990		Margaret Browne, Killeagh
1991	Gaiety Theatre, Dublin	Elaine Murphy, Carrigaline
1992	Olympia Theatre, Dublin	Phil O'Connell
1993	National Concert Hall	Alison Neylon, County Clare
1994	University Concert Hall, Limerick	Hilda Kavanagh, Ballyglass
1995		Philomena Delaney, Limerick

=== Sponsorship ===
In the early years it was simply called Housewife of the Year and was sponsored by the Electricity Supply Board, Woman's Way and food manufacturers McDonnell's of Drogheda. From 1978 it was known as the Calor Kosangas Housewife of the Year, shortened in 1990 to Calor Housewife of the Year. Calor typically supplied a gas cooker as a prize; other prizes included cash and holidays.

== Reception ==
The Housewife of the Year contest attracted controversy from its inception; a 1968 Irish Times editorial said: "Is this then what the nation at present deems the fittest reward for women? Do we, men and women, still think that the woman's place is in the home and only in the home?" and noted the lack of women in political roles in the country.

However, in 1977, it was defended by Senator Mary Harney, who pointed out the importance of housewives and their work to society. Similarly, in 1979, politician Síle de Valera said "a woman whose chooses to stay at home should not feel undervalued or pressurised into thinking that she is less intelligent or less valuable to the community."

In 1986, the Federated Workers' Union of Ireland, representing many RTÉ staff, criticised the show, saying "costly variety productions such as person/nurse/housewife of the year, etc. — sponsored by commercial interests […] [undermine] the editorial integrity and independence of RTÉ." Dave Mulhall of The Irish Times said that the competition's "only reason for existence lies in the promoter's wish to advertise his products," and it was thus inappropriate for a public service broadcaster.

The contest was last held in 1995; it had been criticised by feminists as sexist, while others had complained that too many women with jobs outside the home were taking part: one caller to a radio show complained that contestants "would never get down on their knees to scrub the floor."

After its cancellation, the Housewife of the Year was often cited as an example of an old, pre-Celtic Tiger Ireland, where women's horizons were limited; an "icon of down-home naffness" as Pat Stacey called it in the Irish Independent.

Fintan Walsh wrote on Irish "beauty pageants" such as the Rose of Tralee and Housewife of the Year, coining the term “homelysexuality” to describe “a domesticated, marketable, and commercially profitable sexual accent, paradoxically devoid of eroticism” and arguing that “the Irish pageant has regulated the production of a female sexual accent in particular, emptied of depth, eroticism, or even what might be understood as subjectivity.” In 2018, Patrick Freyne described it as "women with the wits to run CERN or perform brain surgery instead demonstrated how to bake a casserole while being patronised by a man in a nice suit."

== Cultural depictions ==
It was cited by Arthur Mathews as partial inspiration for the Lovely Girls contest in the Father Ted episode "Rock a Hula Ted" (principally inspired by the Rose of Tralee pageant).

A 2016 episode of sitcom Bridget & Eamon revolved around Bridget's attempt to win the Housewife of the Year.

The contest featured in a 2019 retro episode of Gogglebox Ireland. The contest also featured in the 2019 novel Colin and the Concubine by Domhnall O'Donoghue.

== Documentary ==
In 2024, Ciarán Cassidy directed a documentary about the competition, against the backdrop of a changing Ireland. Former finalists and winners were interviewed including those whose homelife was not so idyllic as the competition might have portrayed. RTÉ broadcast the documentary in June 2025.

== See also ==
- Housewife
- Feminism in the Republic of Ireland
- Irish mammy stereotype
- Status of women in the Constitution of Ireland
- Wages for housework
