= Wild About Harry (2000 film) =

- Theatrical release poster
- Directed by: Declan Lowney
- Screenplay by: Colin Bateman
- Produced by: Laurie Borg; Robert Cooper
- Starring: Brendan Gleeson; Amanda Donohoe; James Nesbitt; Adrian Dunbar; Bronagh Gallagher; Ruth McCabe
- Cinematography: Ron Fortunato
- Edited by: Tim Waddell
- Music by: Murray Gold
- Production companies: Universal Pictures International; BBC Films; MBP; Northern Ireland Film and Television Commission; Scala Films; WAVEpictures; Winchester Films
- Distributed by: United International Pictures
- Release dates: 5 October 2000 (Dinard Festival of British Cinema); 26 October 2001 (United Kingdom)
- Running time: 91 minutes
- Countries: United Kingdom; Ireland; Germany
- Language: English

Wild About Harry is a 2000 British comedy film directed by Declan Lowney and written by Colin Bateman. The film stars Brendan Gleeson, Amanda Donohoe, James Nesbitt, Adrian Dunbar, Bronagh Gallagher and Ruth McCabe. The film was released on 26 October 2001 by United International Pictures.

== Plot ==
Harry McKee is a successful television chef for a regional broadcaster. Although he has been in the newspapers a lot because of his alcoholic chap, he is very popular with viewers. In his private life, however, things look different for him: his wife Ruth, whom he has betrayed several times, wants to divorce him. Somewhat emotionally agitated, he exposes local politician Walter Adair in his cooking show by making fun of his sexual preferences. Harry collapses in the ensuing court case, in which the details of his divorce are to be clarified.

When he wakes up after a few days in a coma, Harry has amnesia. The last 25 years seem to have been erased from his memory. He is now in the same hospital as the politician Adair, who has had to seek treatment since fleeing from intrusive journalists and falling from a bridge.

Although Harry's wife and children do not really want to believe him and consider amnesia to be a ploy to delay the divorce, they take him back home. Using old photo albums, they try to refresh his memory. On the advice of the doctors, however, they hide his TV cooking career from him.

However, he is informed about this by his friend and lawyer. He also learns from him that his wife wants to divorce him. Although Harry's complete memory has not yet come back, his unit manager urges him to get back to the cooking shows. During the first show a viewer suddenly disrupts the process. It is Walter Adair, disguised as a woman, who draws a gun and threatens Harry. The program will then also go live on national channels. The meanwhile refined cook wants to give himself up to his fate when suddenly Ruth appears. After she succeeds in disarming Adair, she promises Harry to make up with him again. However, she insists on the divorce and challenges him to reconsider his life. Only when he was absolutely sure that he wanted a future together with her should he contact her again. Harry predicts that he will contact her the same day and ends - as if nothing had happened - his cooking show by announcing the guests of the next show.

== Cast ==
- Brendan Gleeson as Harry McKee
- Amanda Donohoe as Ruth McKee
- James Nesbitt as Walter Adair
- Adrian Dunbar as J.J. MacMahon
- Bronagh Gallagher as Miss Boyle
- Ruth McCabe as Lily
- Doon Mackichan as Tara Adair
- Paul Barber as Prof. Simmington
- George Wendt as Frankie
- Henry Deazley as Billy McKee
- Billy Donnelly as Brendan
- Philip Young as Robbie
- Pat Shortt as Ronnie
- Tara Lynne O'Neill as Claire McKee
- Frank Carson as Tommy Trainor
- Julian Simmons as Michael Bay
- Dick Holland as Patrick Fitzpatrick
- Kieran Grimes as Mark
