= Jennifer Zamparelli =

Irish comedian and television presenter (born 1980)

- Born: Jennifer Maguire; 9 April 1980 (age 46); Dublin, Ireland
- Occupations: Comedian; TV presenter
- Employer: Raidió Teilifís Éireann (RTÉ)
- Known for: Bridget & Eamon; Dancing with the Stars
- Spouse: Lauterio Zamparelli (m. 2014)
- Children: 2

Jennifer Zamparelli (née Maguire; born 9 April 1980) is an Irish comedian, television presenter and radio presenter. She is known for her role on the TV show Republic of Telly, where she was a primary writer, and as co-host of the 2FM morning show Breakfast Republic with Bernard O'Shea and Keith Walsh. She also stars in the sitcom Bridget & Eamon.

== Career ==
Zamparelli appeared on the British television series The Apprentice in its fourth series as a 27-year-old marketing consultant, who says that when she first ran an office, she made £60,000 in six months with no training. She described herself as "the best saleswoman in Europe at the moment". The media portrayed her as "an ice maiden" and as resembling "someone frozen alive while chewing a wasp". She was fired in week 7 along with Jenny Celerier.

After leaving The Apprentice Zamparelli returned to Ireland. She has since embarked on a television career. In August 2008, she participated in the Raidió Teilifís Éireann (RTÉ) reality television show Fáilte Towers, where she reached the final. During the show she went to Castle Leslie with fellow contestant Don Baker. She has also been on radio with Ray Foley on Today FM. In March 2009, Zamparelli was believed to be running a chain of (two) photography studios in Ireland.

She presented the long-running satirical clip show Republic of Telly on RTÉ Two. She was going to leave it to return to the UK in 2011 but decided to stay in Ireland and continue her work on the show. She notably rendered Ryanair chief executive Michael O'Leary speechless on this show when she asked him: "What's it like being the biggest prick in Ireland?" She has also recommended to Marty Whelan that he retire, accused the late Gerry Ryan of being "too old" for the Meteor Music Awards and queried if Gráinne Seoige cringes while watching The All Ireland Talent Show. In 2010 she presented One Night Stand on RTÉ. RTÉ deemed it too risque and cancelled it after one series, to the annoyance of Zamparelli who adjudged them prudish in their outlook.

In September 2011, she was subjected to a mix-up when her pictures mistakenly appeared on the website of model agency Assets. In 2012, she presented online TV show Snug TV.

In October 2018, Zamparelli was announced as the new co-host of the Irish version of Dancing with The Stars alongside Nicky Byrne.

In March 2019, it was announced that Zamparelli would be leaving Breakfast Republic to front her own mid-morning show from June.

In May 2024, she announced that she would be leaving RTÉ 2fm after more than a decade with the station.
