= Redemption of a Rogue =

2020 Irish film

- Poster
- Directed by: Philip Doherty
- Written by: Philip Doherty
- Produced by: Emma Foley; Tamryn Reinecke
- Starring: Aaron Monaghan; Aisling O'Mara; Kieran Roche; Liz Fitzgibbon; Kevin McGahern; Charlie Bonner; Pat McCabe; Shane Connaughton
- Cinematography: Burschi Wojnar
- Edited by: Allyn Quigley
- Music by: Robbie Perry
- Production company: Pale Rebel Productions
- Distributed by: Wildcard Distribution
- Release date: 11 July 2020 (Galway Film Fleadh)
- Running time: 95 minutes
- Country: Ireland
- Language: English

Redemption of a Rogue is a 2020 Irish black comedy film directed and written by Philip Doherty.

== Production ==
The film was produced under the title of Redemption of a Rogue: A Blues Opera. It was the feature film debut of award-winning playwright Philip Doherty, who is the artistic director of Cavan-based Gonzo Theatre Company and is the creator of the comedy series The Begrudgers, which won the RTÉ 2012 StoryLand web drama competition. Doherty narrates the film in five chapters. It was filmed on location in Swanlinbar and Cavan Town.

Aaron Monaghan took on the lead role of Jimmy Cullen, with Aisling O'Mara playing singer Masha. The film crew was supported by local theatre actors. Funding was supplied by Creative Ireland 2019.

The film music was composed by Robbie Perry. In addition to the pieces of music used in the film, mostly guitar, pieces by artists who come from Cavan can be heard.

== Plot ==
Jimmy Cullen has returned to the village of Ballylough in western County Cavan to visit his dying father. At the same time he is looking for redemption. He wants to free himself from the guilt and shame of his past and also say goodbye to the world after the death of his father. In a hardware store he is looking for a suitable rope, the best possible for his suicide.

As Jimmy's father draws his last breath, it suddenly starts to rain and thunder. However, in his will, Jimmy's father stipulates that the funeral should not take place on a rainy day. However, this makes Jimmy's planned suicide attempt difficult, as he realizes that he is in a time warp, a purgatory that will not let him die so easily. Days turn into weeks as he tries to kill himself during a never-ending rain in Ballylough. When he makes the acquaintance of the singer Masha, he realizes that she plays a crucial role on his path to salvation.

== Release ==
The film premiered at Galway Film Fleadh on 11 July 2020. At that time, a first trailer was presented. It was screened at the Palm Springs International Film Festival in January 2022.

=== Reviews ===
The film scored 100% on Rotten Tomatoes, based on 12 positive reviews. Davide Abbatescianni of the online film magazine Cineuropa writes in his review that in general this black comedy reflects somewhat the unsettling atmosphere of the Coen brothers' films, but that its uniqueness and brilliant writing may also have been influenced by Philip Doherty's earlier work in theatre. Overall, the result achieved by Doherty is truly commendable and will hopefully pave the way for his future film projects. In The Guardian, Leslie Felperin gave it three stars out of five, saying that Redemption of a Rogue was "a little meandering and prone to repeat the same comedy beats ad infinitum," but that "The crisp editing neatens the edges of the gags, while regular musical interludes add a pleasant aural texture."

=== Awards ===
Galway Film Fleadh 2020

- Best Irish Film Award (Philip Doherty)
- Best Irish First Feature Award (Philip Doherty)

Irish Film and Television Awards 2022

- Best Screenplay nomination (Philip Doherty)
- Best Actor nomination (Aaron Monaghan)
- Nomination for Best camera (Burschi Wojnar)

Brussels International Fantastic Film Festival 2022

- Honorable mention in White Raven Competition
