= Xavier Roberts =

American businessman

- Born: October 31, 1955 (age 70); Cleveland, Georgia
- Known for: Cabbage Patch Kids

Xavier Roberts (born October 31, 1955, in Cleveland, Georgia) is an American businessman best known for creating the Cabbage Patch Kids, a once immensely popular soft sculpted doll company.

== Early life ==
When Xavier Roberts was five, his father died in a car accident, leaving his mother to raise him and his five siblings. Roberts then attended White County High School and then attended Truett McConnell Junior College where he was an award-winning art student.

== Cabbage Patch Kids development ==
In 1976, Xavier Roberts met Martha Nelson Thomas at a craft fair. He asked her to supply him with dolls to sell in Georgia, where he lived and worked. Thomas briefly let him sell her Doll Babies, but stopped. Thomas sued Roberts and won an undisclosed amount after the case was settled out of court. Roberts created a new version in 1978, and in 1982 he licensed the dolls to Coleco for mass-production under the name Cabbage Patch Kids.

Roberts traveled from state to state in the southeastern United States attending craft fairs and folk art exhibitions where he sold the Chinese-crafted dolls. He won awards for his work, including a first-place ribbon for a doll named Dexter at the Osceola Craft Show in Florida in 1978.

Going into business as Original Appalachian Artworks, Inc., Roberts hired local seamstresses and started producing his dolls in a converted medical clinic in his hometown of Cleveland. "Babyland General Hospital" still exists today in a new location.

By 1982, the Little People had evolved into Cabbage Patch Kids, licensed to Coleco. The Cabbage Patch Kids were a huge hit, quickly becoming a major toy fad. In 1984 alone, 20 million dolls were bought, and by 1999, 95 million dolls had been sold worldwide.

== Furskin Bears creation ==
Roberts would later create a series of country-inspired toy bears called the Furskin Bears.

== Accomplishments ==
Due to the commercial success of his Little People line, Roberts was a millionaire by the age of 26.

Other artwork by Roberts has been featured in galleries such as the High Museum of Art in Atlanta, Georgia. His creations also became part of the State of Georgia's permanent art collection after Roberts presented three Little People to Georgia Governor George Busbee.
