= Babyland General Hospital =

Fictional "birthplace" of Cabbage Patch Kids at 300 NOK Drive, in Cleveland, Georgia

Coordinates: 34°37′19.5″N 83°45′40.89″W

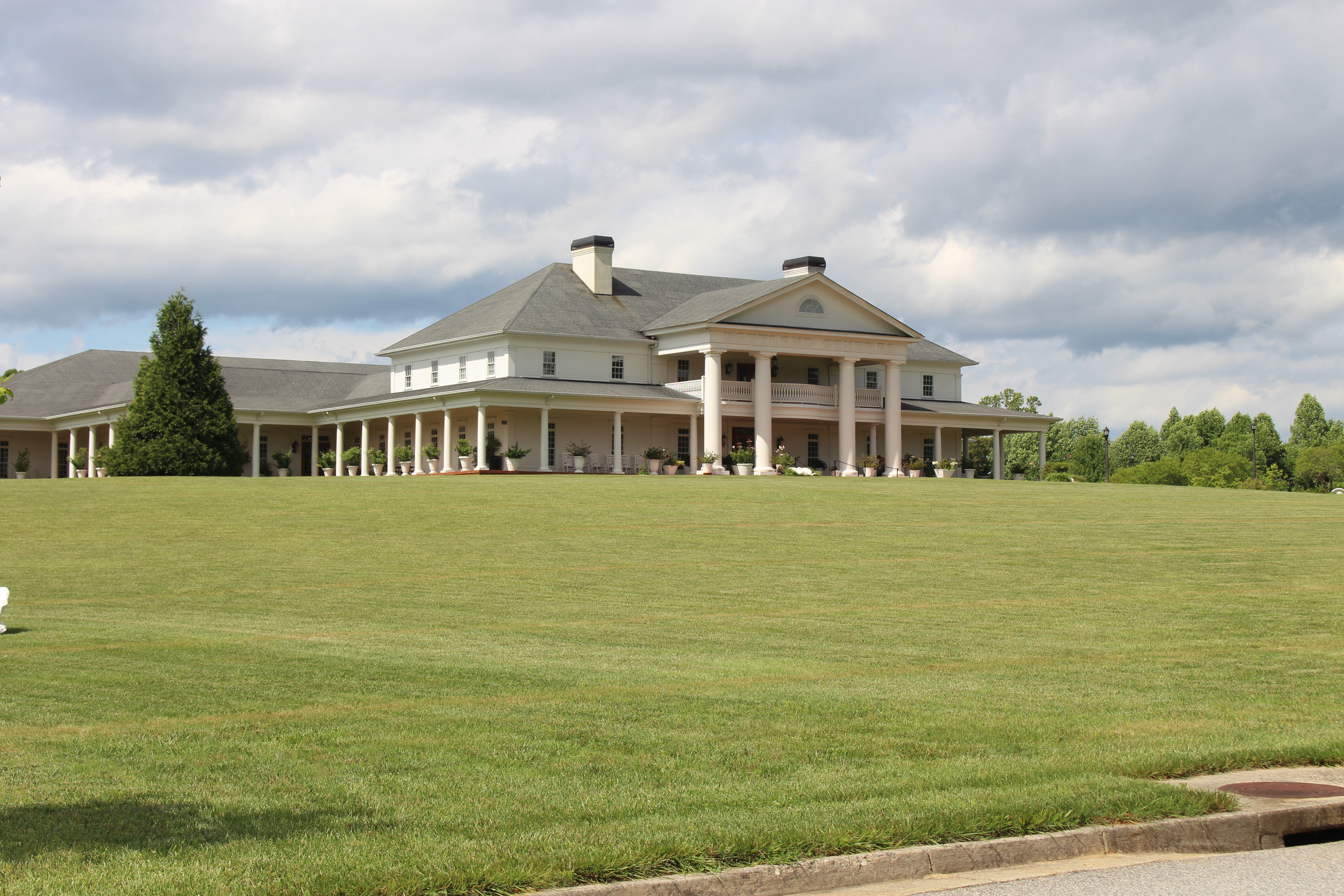
Babyland General Hospital in Cleveland, Georgia

Babyland General Hospital is the fictional "birthplace" of the Cabbage Patch Kids dolls located in Cleveland, Georgia. Xavier Roberts converted a former clinic into a retail facility for the sale of his dolls, originally called "Little People." It is presented as a birthing, nursery, and adoption center for premium Cabbage Patch Kids. Although the fad surrounding the dolls has largely died down, this site attracts numerous fans and curiosity seekers.

== New location ==
The Babyland General Hospital looked to move into a new $2.5 million location in Cleveland as revealed in the White County News Telegraph. Cleveland was decided on as the new site and it opened in the spring of 2009.
