= Keith Walsh =

Irish radio DJ

Keith Walsh is an Irish radio DJ. Previously the lead anchor for RTÉ 2fm's early morning programme Breakfast Republic with comedians Bernard O'Shea and Jennifer Maguire, Walsh now presents on 2fm on Saturdays and Sundays. His involvement with radio started with community radio station Phoenix Radio and then pirate Phantom 105.2. He partnered on these stations with Joe Donnelly. After their stint on pirate Phantom, Walsh and Donnelly worked at Dublin's SPIN 1038. Keith went on to be programme director for i105107 and then for fully licensed Phantom 105.2. He was eventually joined on the latter by his old radio friend Joe Donnelly to co-host its breakfast show. Keith then left for RTÉ 2fm. He is married and has two children.
