= Dermot Whelan =

Irish comedian

Dermot Whelan (born 16 February 1973) is an Irish comedian, television and radio presenter and wellness expert, who has worked for both Raidió Telifís Éireann and in the commercial sector. He co-presented the Dermot and Dave show on Today FM, an on-air pairing which dated from 2002, until August 2023. He left the show in 2023 to pursue solo opportunities promoting his mindfulness podcast and shows.

Whelan was a regular contributor on RTÉ's The Panel. He is also the former host of Republic of Telly and has performed at several comedy festivals, including the Kilkenny Cat's Laugh Festival and the Edinburgh Festival Fringe. Whelan was a co-host of the 98FM Morning Crew radio show in Dublin, alongside Dave Moore and Siobhan O'Connor. Whelan also worked for Dublin City FM in his early career.

Other television credits include The Soccer Show on TV3 and appearances on The Property Game on the same station.

In 2014, Dermot and his fellow host and friend, Dave Moore, joined the Irish independent national station, Today FM, with their show, "Dermot and Dave" first airing every Monday to Friday from midday to 2:30 p.m. They subsequently moved to the 9a.m.-midday slot, broadcasting there from January 2017 onwards.

Whelan retired from broadcasting in 2023, to concentrate on wellness. Moore became the lead presenter on the renamed "Dave Moore Show".

== Awards ==
Whelan won a Meteor Music Award in 2009 for Best Regional DJ with co-hosts Dave Moore and Siobhan O'Connor for their morning time radio show.

Year	Nominee / work	Award	Result
2009	Dermot Whelan	Best Regional DJ at the Meteor Awards	Won
