= Cabbage Patch Kids =

American doll brand

- Type: Dolls
- Company: Coleco (1982–1988); Hasbro (1988–1994); Mattel (1994–2003); Toys "R" Us (2003); Play Along (2004–2011); Jakks Pacific (2011–2014); Wicked Cool Toys (2015–present)
- Country: United States; Japan
- Availability: 1978–present
- Official website

Cabbage Patch Kids are a line of cloth dolls with plastic heads first produced by Coleco Industries in 1982. They were inspired by the Little People soft sculptured dolls sold by Xavier Roberts as collectibles. The brand was renamed 'Cabbage Patch Kids' by Roger L. Schlaifer when he acquired the exclusive worldwide licensing rights in 1982.

The doll brand set every toy industry sales record for three years running, was one of the most popular lines of children's licensed products in the 1980s, and has become one of the longest-running doll franchises in the United States. Additional Cabbage Patch products include children's apparel, bedding, infants' wear, record albums, and board games.

== Production history ==
=== Creation and development ===
According to court records, Roberts, a 21-year-old art student at a missionary school in North Georgia, discovered craft artist Martha Nelson's Doll Babies. They came with a birth certificate and adoption papers. With the help of artist Debbie Moorehead, he hand-stitched dolls called "The Little People". Roberts modified the look of Nelson's dolls, birth certificate and adoption papers sufficiently to get a copyright, and told potential customers his Little People were not for sale; however, they could be "adopted" for prices ranging from $60 to $1,000.

The Little People were first sold at arts and crafts shows, then later at Babyland General Hospital, an old medical clinic that Roberts and his friends-turned-employees converted into a toy store, in Cleveland, Georgia.

In 1981, at the height of Roberts's success, he was approached by Atlanta designer and licensing agent, Roger L. Schlaifer about licensing The Little People. As Fisher-Price owned the name "Little People", the name was changed to "Cabbage Patch Kids". His goal was to build the first and largest mass-market children's brand in history. In order to attract potential doll manufacturers and to create the entertainment and publishing businesses he envisioned, Schlaifer and his partner/wife wrote the Legend of the Cabbage Patch Kids. To make sense of how special cabbages gave birth to Cabbage Patch Kids, Schlaifer invented BunnyBees—the bee-like creatures that use their rabbit ears to fly about and pollinate cabbages with magical crystals. Since Roberts insisted on being a character in the story, Schlaifer created him as a curious ten-year-old boy who discovered the Cabbage Patch Kids by following a BunnyBee behind a waterfall into a magical Cabbage Patch, where he found the Cabbage Patch babies being born in a neglected garden. To save them from being abducted to work in the gold mines operated by the villainess Lavender McDade and her two cohorts in crime, Cabbage Jack and Beau Weasel, young Roberts tried to save them by finding loving parents who would adopt them and keep them safe in their homes.

In 1982, Coleco's design team, headed by famed doll designer Judy Albert, devised an industry first: one-of-a-kind, plastic-headed Cabbage Patch Kids dolls with cuter features, softer bodies and a normal toddler's proportions instead of the obese bodies of Roberts' originals. It was those comparatively inexpensive ($18 to $28) dolls, branded in packaging designed by Schlaifer and produced in Coleco's factories in China, that succeeded commercially.

Coleco cancelled all of its advertising as they tried to keep up with demand, shipping 3.3 million dolls in 1983. Sales of dolls in 1984, along with Cabbage Patch branded merchandise generated $2,000,000,000 in retail sales across North America, Europe, Japan, Australia and New Zealand.

Coleco's sales continued to climb right through 1986, when they reportedly over-shipped and lost ground in a legal battle with Schlaifer and Roberts over his introduction of "Furskins Bears"—a collection of hillbilly bears that competed with the Cabbage Patch dolls. Coleco's sales plummeted from over $800 million in 1986 to nothing in 1988 when the company went out of business.

=== Coleco years ===
After changing the dolls' name to Cabbage Patch Kids, Schlaifer contacted all the major doll companies in the country. Most declined, commenting that the look of the Little People was too ugly to sell on the mass-market. Coleco, then famous for its success with electronic toys, were sold on becoming the Master Toy licensee, including an advertising guarantee.

At the peak of their popularity, between 1983 and 1986, the dolls were highly sought-after toys for Christmas. Cabbage Patch riots occurred as parents literally fought to obtain the dolls for children. In later years, Coleco introduced variants on the original Cabbage Patch Kids, and derivatives of the original line of dolls continued to be marketed.

=== International variations ===
When Coleco was producing the dolls for the North American market during the 1980s, they provided technical assistance to other doll manufacturers in Panama, Europe, Australia and Japan who wanted to use their molds.

=== Hasbro years ===
Hasbro took over the rights to produce Cabbage Patch dolls in 1988 after Coleco filed for Chapter 11 bankruptcy, and continued to make the dolls with various gimmicks, including dolls that played kazoos. Some of the more popular doll lines to come out under the Cabbage Patch Kids name included the "Birthday Kids", "Splash 'n' Tan Kids", and "Pretty Crimp and Curl". Hasbro produced a 10th anniversary doll, reintroducing Schlaifer's original packaging – a practice that other CPK doll manufacturers would do to give sales a boost on various anniversaries. Hasbro gradually began making the dolls for younger children, which led to smaller and smaller dolls.

=== Mattel years ===
In 1994, Mattel acquired the licensing rights to the dolls from Original Appalachian Artworks. Their first Cabbage Patch dolls hit the stores in 1995.

The Mattel Cabbage Patch dolls were not limited to cloth bodies and included dolls made from vinyl, resulting in a more durable play doll. The Mattel dolls are mostly sized 14" or smaller, and most variants were individualized with a gimmick to enhance their collectibility, e.g. some dolls played on water toys, swam, ate food, or brushed their teeth.

Some Mattel lines include the updated Kids line of basic cloth dolls that came with birth certificates, the OlympiKids that were made to coincide with the 1996 Olympics, and the Cabbage Patch Fairies. In January 1997, Mattel recalled the franchise's Snacktime Kids dolls after numerous complaints that they were chewing on children's hair and fingers. Also, to celebrate the dolls' 15th anniversary, Mattel created a line of exclusively female dolls with reproduction face molds, dressed in a reproduction dresses reminiscent of the original line and packaged in retro style box. These were 16 inches tall, the same measurement of the first Coleco Cabbage Kids.

=== Toys "R" Us Kids ===
In 2001, with Mattel's sales stalling, a former Coleco marketing employee, Al Kahn, acquired Original Appalachian's licensing rights and sold retailer Toys "R" Us on producing 20-inch (50.8 cm) Kids dolls and 18-inch (45.7 cm) baby dolls, both with cloth bodies and vinyl heads. They were packaged in cardboard cabbage leaf seats. In 2001, the 20-inch dolls debuted in the Times Square flagship store. These were created to celebrate the 20th anniversary of the line, and were available both online and in stores around the US. Expensive and deemed too cumbersome for most young children to play with, they did not last long at the retailer.

=== Play Along Toys ===
Play Along toys next obtained exclusive licensing rights to produce the Cabbage Patch Kids doll line. In 2004, again using Schlaifer's original packaging, Play Along launched a Cabbage Patch Kids 25th Anniversary collection using some of the original head sculpts from the very first Coleco editions. Play Along also partnered with Carvel in a co-branding campaign. The resulting co-branded Cabbage Patch Kids were packaged with a Carvel-branded ice cream cone.

=== Jakks Pacific ===
JAKKS Pacific acquired Play Along Toys and assumed the master toy licensee for the Cabbage Patch Kids in 2011. Jakks introduced a 14-inch (35.6 cm) Cabbage Patch Kids Fashionality line and other Cabbage Patch Kid products. In 2013, Jakks Pacific released the Celebration edition to commemorate the 30th Birthday of the licensed Cabbage Patch Kids.

=== Wicked Cool Toys ===
Wicked Cool Toys is the master toy licensee for Cabbage Patch Kids as of 2015.

Wicked Cool Toys released new additions like Little Sprouts, a line of tiny collectable dolls, only 1.5 inches tall. They also released Adoptimals, 8-inch plus pets that a Cabbage Patch Kid can adopt.

== Cabbage Patch Kids brand ==
The original 1982 Cabbage Patch Kids license agreement with Coleco Industries was negotiated by Roger L. Schlaifer, doing business as Schlaifer Nance & Company (SN&C), the exclusive worldwide licensor for Original Appalachian Artworks, Roberts' company at the time.

Following Schlaifer Nance & Company's signing of Coleco Industries, SN&C designed and/or directed the design and quality of virtually all CPK branded products produced by its over one hundred and fifty CPK licensed manufacturers, including Coleco. They included the first children's licensed character diapers and low-sugar cereal, children's apparel, bedding, stationery products, books, backyard pools, and thousands of other children's products—generating over $2 billion in retail sales for 1984, alone. Total sales during the Schlaifer's six-year tenure exceeded $4.5 billion, more than ten times the total revenues of Cabbage Patch Kids merchandise and entertainment in the thirty years since—the latter of which never made the impact Roberts claimed it would under his direction in the November 1983 edition of Esquire magazine. And while sales of the dolls and other licensed products declined precipitously in the late 1980s, the dolls have become a mainstay of the toy industry, and one of the few long-running doll brands in history.

== Porcelain Cabbage Patch Kids ==
These limited edition dolls were available from Applause gifts and later by direct mail from the Danbury Mint. They have a rigid fabric body with porcelain legs, arms, and head.

== Talking Cabbage Patch Kids ==
"Talking Cabbage Patch Kids" were among the last new CPK lines introduced by Coleco. They were equipped with a voice chip, touch sensors, a microphone, short range 49 MHz AM transmitter and receiver for communicating with other dolls. Touch sensors in the hands enabled the toy to detect when and how it was being played with in response to its vocalizations. For example, the doll might say "hold my hand" and give an appropriate speech response when the touch sensor in either hand detected pressure. It also had a movement detector to show the positioning of the doll and whether it was sensed to be on its belly, back, or even upside down. A special plastic drinking cup containing a hidden magnet, which could be identified with the aid a small reed relay in the built into the head of the toy above the mouth, to signify when it should be seen to be drinking. A more remarkable effect occurred when one doll detected the presence of another through its 49 MHz AM transmitter/receiver. The dolls were programmed to signal their "awareness" of each other with a short phrase, e.g. "I think there's someone else to play with here!", and then to initiate simple conversations between the dolls themselves with enough randomness to sound somewhat natural, the joint synchronised singing of 'rounds' being particularly impressive. The inclusion of the microphone was to delay the search and communication with another of its type when the ambient noise was above a certain level.

== Babyland General Hospital ==
Babyland General Hospital is the "birthplace" of Little People and is located in Cleveland, Georgia. With the help of local friends, Roberts converted an old doctor's clinic into a general store/souvenir shop and "doll hospital" from which to sell his original "Little People". The facility is presented as a birthing, nursery, and adoption center for the Cabbage Patch Kids. In accordance with the theme, employees dressed and pretended to be doctors and nurses caring for the dolls as if they were real. Babyland General moved to a new facility on the outskirts of Cleveland, Georgia, in 2010 and has been voted one of the Travel Channel's top 10 toylands.

== Adaptations ==
=== The Cabbage Patch Kids' First Christmas ===
The Cabbage Patch Kids' First Christmas
- Directed by: Charles August Nichols
- Screenplay by: Woody Kling
- Produced by: Larry Huber
- Starring: Hal Smith, Tress MacNeille, Arthur Burghardt, Neil Ross
- Edited by: Mary Nelson-Duerrstein
- Production company: Ruby-Spears Enterprises
- Distributed by: Worldvision Enterprises
- Release date: December 7, 1984
- Running time: 23 minutes
- Country: United States
- Language: English

Under the direction of ABC V.P. of programming, Squire Rushnell, and produced by Ruby-Spears with music by Joe Raposo, The Cabbage Patch Kids' First Christmas, premiered on ABC on December 7, 1984, and was the top-rated show in its time-slot.

==== Cast ====
- Hal Smith – Colonel Casey, Lumberjack
- Tress MacNeille – Lavender McDade, Bertha, Mrs. Clark
- Arthur Burghardt – Cabbage Jack, Gus
- Neil Ross – Beau Weasel, Fingers
- Sparky Marcus – Xavier Roberts
- Scott Menville – Otis Lee
- Josh Rodine – Dawson Glen
- David Mendenhall – Cousin Cannon Lee
- Penina Segall – Sybil Sadie
- Ebonie Smith – Rachel Marie
- Gini Holtzman – Jenny Clark
- Vaughn Tyree Jelks – Tyler Bo
- Anne Marie McEvoy – Paula Louise
- Peter Cullen – Hotel Worker, Policeman (uncredited)

Additional shows include Cabbage Patch Kids: The New Kid, a stop-motion animated special produced by Goldhill Entertainment, and aired on the FOX Kids Network programming block on August 26, 1995. It was followed by four other stop-motion animated specials, Cabbage Patch Kids: The Club House in 1996; Cabbage Patch Kids: The Screen Test in 1997; Cabbage Patch Kids: Saturday Night in 1998; and Cabbage Patch Kids: Vernon's Christmas in 1999.

Roberts rejected an offer from ABC for an hour Saturday show combining Cabbage Patch Kids and Furskins Bears.

In 2024, MeTV Toons aired the Christmas special as part of the network's "Tis' the Season for Toons" event.

== Controversies ==
=== Lawsuits ===
Though Xavier Roberts originated the look of Little People, many of Little People's defining characteristics—such as the dolls' overly round faces and that they came with an adoption certificate—were taken from Martha Nelson Thomas, an American folk artist from Kentucky. Before Roberts became involved in the toy industry, Thomas had created and marketed her own line of dolls, called Doll Babies, which she sold at local arts and craft shows and markets. Roberts began purchasing Thomas' dolls in 1976 to sell at a profit at his own store in Georgia. Thomas later stopped selling additional dolls to Roberts, prompting him to turn to a manufacturing company in Hong Kong to mass produce dolls similar in appearance to Thomas' at a cheaper cost. Thomas brought suit against Roberts and eventually settled out of court for an undisclosed amount in 1985. She and her husband, Tucker Thomas, told the press that she was more upset by the corruption of her dolls, for which she cared deeply, than the money she'd lost as the result of Roberts' actions. Thomas died in 2013, at the age of 62, with her favorite dolls attending her funeral alongside her family members and friends.

Roberts' company, Original Appalachian Artworks, later brought a $30 million lawsuit against Topps, the company that produced grotesque trading cards parodying his company's dolls called the Garbage Pail Kids, for copyright infringement. Having sold over $70 million worth of the cards, Topps settled with OAA for $7 million—tantamount to a license—and retained the right to continue producing the Garbage Pail Kids cards.

In a bitter legal battle with SN&C over whether OAA had violated their licensing Agreement with SN&C and Coleco's exclusivity by producing a Cabbage Patch bear as a line of "Furskins Bears", and failing to pay SN&C its share of the Topps settlement and refusing to allow ABC TV from doing a Saturday morning animated TV show, Roberts worked out a side deal with Coleco for tens of millions of dollars for a renewal of Schlaifer's Cabbage Patch agreement, and jointly litigated against SN&C. The suit was settled in 1988 by OAA and Coleco paying SN&C an undisclosed amount of money. In addition, Paula Osborne, OAA president until Roberts worked out the deal with Coleco, sued over the share she was entitled to as a stockholder of OAA and received a seven-figure settlement. Six months after settling with SN&C, Coleco was out of business.

=== Product safety ===
One of Mattel's line of Cabbage Patch Kids dolls, the Cabbage Patch Snacktime Kids, was designed to "eat" plastic snacks. The mechanism enabling this was a pair of one-way smooth metal rollers behind plastic lips. The snacks would exit the doll's back and "magically" appear into a backpack. The mechanism could be de-activated by releasing the backpack. They were extremely popular during Christmas 1996. The line was voluntarily withdrawn from the market following an agreement between Mattel and the Consumer Product Safety Commission in January 1997 following several incidents where children got their fingers or hair stuck in the dolls' mouths leading to safety warnings from Connecticut's consumer protection commissioner.

== Timeline ==
- 1977: Xavier Roberts is introduced to Martha Nelson Thomas' "Doll Babies" concept
- 1978: The first "Little People Originals" were delivered by Xavier Roberts, who incorporated Original Appalachian Artworks, Inc.
- 1981: There was coverage of the dolls' popularity in Newsweek, The Wall Street Journal, and Atlanta Weekly.
- 1982: OAA licensed Plaid Enterprises to produce a cheaper Little People facsimile as a Little People Pal. The concept died as soon as Coleco's Cabbage Patch Kids came out.
- 1982: Roger Schlaifer recommended that OAA change the name to Cabbage Patch Kids, and use new graphics to build a major children's brand.
- 1982, March 1: OAA signs an exclusive worldwide agreement to license Little People as Cabbage Patch Kids with Schlaifer Nance & Company and puts Schlaifer on a monthly retainer to do so.
- 1982, August 9: Schlaifer Nance & Company, Inc. signed a long term licensing agreement with Coleco Industries as its Master Toy licensee, granting them the worldwide rights to manufacture the dolls and other CPK branded toys.
- 1982: The first prototypes of Cabbage Patch Kids created by Coleco Industries were approved for production by Xavier Roberts.
- 1983: Cabbage Patch Kids were introduced with great fanfare at the International Toy Fair in NYC. By October, riots were breaking out in stores and featured in newspaper cartoons around the country.
- 1983, December: A photo of a Cabbage Patch Kid in the arms of a little girl was the cover of Newsweek magazine and the subject of jokes on Johnny Carson regularly.
- 1984: Sales for Cabbage Patch Kids branded products, from toys to children's apparel, set a children's merchandising record setting of $2 billion. The CPK record, titled Cabbage Patch Dreams, produced by the Chapin Brothers for Parker Brothers' music, went Platinum and Parker Publishing's series of Cabbage Kids’ books were best sellers. The video game Cabbage Patch Kids: Adventures in the Park was released.
- 1985: Cabbage Patch Kids low-sugar breakfast cereal – an idealist attempt to get children to eat healthier foods, ceased production after selling $10,000 worth of cereal. Real children's character art diapers were introduced. The Cabbage Patch Kids' First Christmas animated special with music by famed composer, Joe Raposo, was number one in its time slot on ABC.
- 1986: The first talking Cabbage Patch Kids were released. OAA sued Schlaifer Nance over their having the right to mass produce a line of Cabbage Patch Bears called Furskins.
- 1988: Coleco Industries filed for bankruptcy, but the dolls continued to be made, with the licensing rights being granted to Hasbro Industries. Although popular, they never regained their earlier popularity.
- 1992: Cabbage Patch Kids were named the official mascot of the 1992 U.S. Olympic team and members of the team were given their own dolls to take to the games.
- 1996: The Cabbage Patch Snacktime Kids were released.
- 1999: The dolls were selected as one of the 15 commemorative US postage stamps representing the 1980s.
- 2008: Democrat and Republican US Presidential and Vice Presidential Candidates had their own Cabbage Kids. Barack Obama was depicted with a blue suit. John McCain was depicted in a suit with grey hair. Joe Biden was also depicted in a suit with his hair slicked up. Sarah Palin was depicted in a trademark suit and skirt with high heeled pumps. Also, Palin's signature hair and eyeglasses were featured.
- 2023: Cabbage Patch Kids were inducted into The Strong National Museum of Play's Toy Hall of Fame.

== See also ==
- Garbage Pail Kids
- Garbage Pail Kids (TV series)
- The Garbage Pail Kids Movie
