= Republic of Telly =

- Genre: Television comedy
- Created by: James Cotter
- Written by: James Cotter, Dermot Whelan, Shane Mulvey, Kevin McGahern
- Directed by: Ashling Fallon Casey
- Presented by: Neil Delamere (2009–2010); Dermot Whelan (2010–13); Kevin McGahern (2013–16)
- Starring: The Rubberbandits; Damo and Ivor; Jennifer Maguire (2010–15); Bernard O'Shea; Bláthnaid Ní Chofaigh; Mairéad Farrell (2009–2010)
- Theme music composer: Daft Punk
- Opening theme: "Television Rules the Nation"
- Ending theme: "Television Rules the Nation"
- Country of origin: Ireland
- Original language: English
- No. of series: 7
- No. of episodes: 121

Production
- Production locations: Studio 4, RTÉ Television Centre, Donnybrook, Dublin 4, Ireland
- Camera setup: Multi-camera
- Running time: 30 minutes

Original release
- Network: RTÉ2
- Release: 24 October 2009 – December 2016

Republic of Telly is a TV review and magazine programme on Irish public broadcaster, RTÉ2 that ran for seven seasons between 2009-2016. It was a satirical examination of television, mocking various Irish and British TV channels, including sketches and special guests making an appearance from the shows.

The show was hosted by Neil Delamere (2009–2010), Dermot Whelan (2010–13) and lastly Kevin McGahern (2013–16), and featured correspondents including Jennifer Maguire who conducted vox pops and celebrity interviews, and Bernard O'Shea who conducted live 'on the spot' reports (filmed in front of a greenscreen). Series two also introduced comedians The Rubberbandits as reporters, bizarre weathermen and agony aunts. The series contributed to the chart success of The Rubberbandits single "Horse Outside", as well as "Everybody's Drinkin'" and "Big Box Little Box" by Damo and Ivor.

== Series ==
=== First series ===
The first series, which was presented by Neil Delamere began in 2009. The first series continued on 15 February 2010 and concluded in the spring of that year. The series featured Mairéad Farrell and had guests such as Marty Whelan, Kathryn Thomas, the cast of The Apprentice, and Dermot Whelan.

=== Second series ===
The second series, with Dermot Whelan taking over as host, began in October 2010. The second series continued in March 2011 and concluded in the spring of that year. RTÉ's political correspondent David McCullagh made a formal complaint to RTÉ after the programme caused rumours to spread of a government minister's resignation, an event that would have reduced the coalition's majority to two.

=== Third series ===
The third series began on 17 October 2011, with an episode featuring Georgia Salpa, Damo and Ivor, Dead Cat Bounce and Darby the Leprechaun. The season continued until 24 April 2012.

=== Fourth series ===
The fourth series of the instalment began broadcasting on 22 October 2012 at 10 pm. Robogarda debuted and Georgia Salpa, considered by RTÉ to be a celebrity woman "who tends to pop up almost anywhere", returned. In December *The Republic of Telly DVD was released. The season concluded in May 2013.

=== Fifth series ===
The fifth series of Republic of Telly started on 28 October 2013. After Dermot Whelan announced he would no longer be presenting the show, it was announced that comedian Kevin McGahern would be taking over as host. McGahern is best known for his role as 'Sim Card' on RTÉ's Hardy Bucks and also appeared on television adverts for Three Ireland. The fifth season concluded on 12 May 2014 with a special 1980s edition, which saw the old RTÉ2 logo used onscreen as the DOG (Digital Onscreen Graphic), a 4:3 aspect ratio filter on the episode and a modified opening theme tune and graphics. Some regular parts of the show took on a 1980s vibe, including the Republic of Telly logo itself, Kevin McGahern's desk and Bernard's News (The Quarter to Tenish News), which was in the episode 'Bernard's Beat Box' referring to the old RTÉ music show BeatBox.

=== Sixth series ===
The sixth series of Republic of Telly debuted on 3 November 2014. From the beginning it was notable that Jennifer Maguire was absent and this was due to her being on maternity leave. This situation was overcome by the feature "Jen of the Week" where a person would stand in for Jennifer. Later on she made a few short appearances. For the first time since it began, Bernards' News didn't return, instead, News Republic took its place with a similar concept to Bernards' News. News Republic was originally headed by Al Porter but this changed to The Viper later in the series. The final episode in series 6 aired on 18 May 2015 and featured a beach party theme.

=== Seventh series ===
The seventh series of Republic of Telly aired on 19 October 2015 on RTÉ2 with Joanne McNally replacing Jennifer Maguire. In February 2017, RTÉ cancelled the show after an eight-year run.
