= Premier Soccer Saturday =

- Starring: Bill O'Herlihy; Peter Collins; Darragh Maloney; Johnny Giles; Liam Brady; Eamon Dunphy; Ray Houghton; Ronnie Whelan; Kenny Cunningham; Richie Sadlier; Trevor Steven; George Hamilton
- Country of origin: Ireland
- No. of seasons: 15

Production
- Running time: 90 minutes

Original release
- Network: RTÉ2
- Release: September 1998 – May 2013

Related
- Monday Night Soccer; Soccer Republic

Premier Soccer Saturday (formerly The Premiership) was the principal weekly club association football programme on RTÉ television.

In June 2013, RTÉ Sport confirmed that due to cost-cutting initiatives to save the station up to €1.3m a year, it would no longer have the Irish rights to television coverage of the Premier League, with the 2012-13 Premier League season being the final season shown on RTÉ Sport.

The programme was broadcast on RTÉ Two every Saturday evening between 19:30 and 21:00 and occasionally on Sunday (when there was an important game played that day) during the English league soccer season, showing highlights of Premier League football matches. When the show was aired on a day other than Saturday, it used the appropriately customised title (e.g. Premier Soccer Sunday). The programme only showed English association football, as Monday Night Soccer covered Irish association football.

== History ==
The programme was first broadcast in September 1998 as The Premiership. Between August 2004 and May 2007, RTÉ also had the broadcasting rights to 15 live Premier League matches on Saturday afternoons (kick off: 15:00). These programmes were called Premiership Live. Setanta Sports obtained exclusive rights to the games from the 2007–08 season onwards.

The show was reformatted or not broadcast on several occasions during the 2010 snowstorms in Great Britain and Ireland. For example, on Saturday 18 December 2010, the show's format was changed to show extended highlights of the only two Premiership games that were played. And, on Sunday 19 December 2010, a proposed Premier Soccer Sunday special was cancelled.

One feature introduced to Premier Soccer Saturday involved fans providing match analysis. When this segment, nicknamed "fanalysts", was aired, the shows were extended to over 2 hours.

On 30 April 2012, there was a special Premier Soccer Monday that showed highlights of the Manchester Derby between the top two teams of that year's Premier League. Because the game, which was won by Man City, began at 19:45, the highlights show ran from 23:00 to 00:00.

In May 2013, RTÉ Head of sport Ryle Nugent announced that RTÉ Sport would not pay for the rights of Premier League to show highlights. Therefore, Premier Soccer Saturday/Sunday was finished.

== Presenters ==
The programme was most recently presented on a rotational basis between Peter Collins and Darragh Maloney. Bill O'Herlihy was previously the sole presenter of the program.

== Contributors ==
Pundits that sometimes featured on the show included Eamon Dunphy, Johnny Giles, Ray Houghton, Trevor Steven, Kenny Cunningham, Ronnie Whelan, Liam Brady, Richard Sadlier and Graeme Souness.

Former Prime Minister Bertie Ahern made an appearance on the show in 2001, providing analysis on a Manchester United game, of whom he is a lifelong supporter.

Commentary on the match highlights and reports were provided by, amongst others, George Hamilton, Ger Canning, Joanne Cantwell, and Jimmy Magee.
