= RTÉ Sport =

Department of Irish public broadcaster RTÉ

- Company type: Independent Business Division (IBD) of RTÉ
- Headquarters: RTÉ Television Centre, Donnybrook; Dublin 4, Ireland
- Area served: Republic of Ireland; Northern Ireland
- Services: Radio and television broadcasts
- Owner: RTÉ
- Website: rte.ie

RTÉ Sport is a department of Irish public broadcaster RTÉ. The department provides sporting coverage through a number of platforms including RTÉ Radio, RTÉ Television, RTÉ.ie, RTÉ Player Sport and RTÉ Mobile. RTÉ holds the television and radio broadcasting rights in the Republic of Ireland to several sports, broadcasting the sport live or alongside flagship analysis programmes such as The Sunday Game, Thank GAA It's Friday, Soccer Republic and RTÉ Racing on RTÉ Television, and Game On, Saturday Sport, and Sunday Sport on RTÉ Radio.

Traditionally RTÉ Sport faced competition from British-based broadcasters such as the BBC and ITV, which have always been present in Ireland; however, these broadcasters were primarily concerned with the British public and market. Domestically, RTÉ had no competition until the late 1990s due to lack of competition in the Irish market. In later years, however, a growth of variety in the Irish market opened competition between other broadcasters most notably with TG4 and Setanta Sports but also Virgin Media One. RTÉ Sport is also in competition with other European broadcasters such as Eurosport, ESPN, Sky Sports, BBC Sport and ITV Sport. Despite competition in sporting events such as the FIFA World Cup final, which is also available on the BBC and ITV, RTÉ Sport remains Ireland's premier and most popular sports broadcaster.

== Television broadcasts ==
On television, RTÉ2 is the home of live sporting action, broadcasting the majority of RTÉ's sports content. Sport may also be broadcast on RTÉ One depending on scheduling demands.

=== Football ===
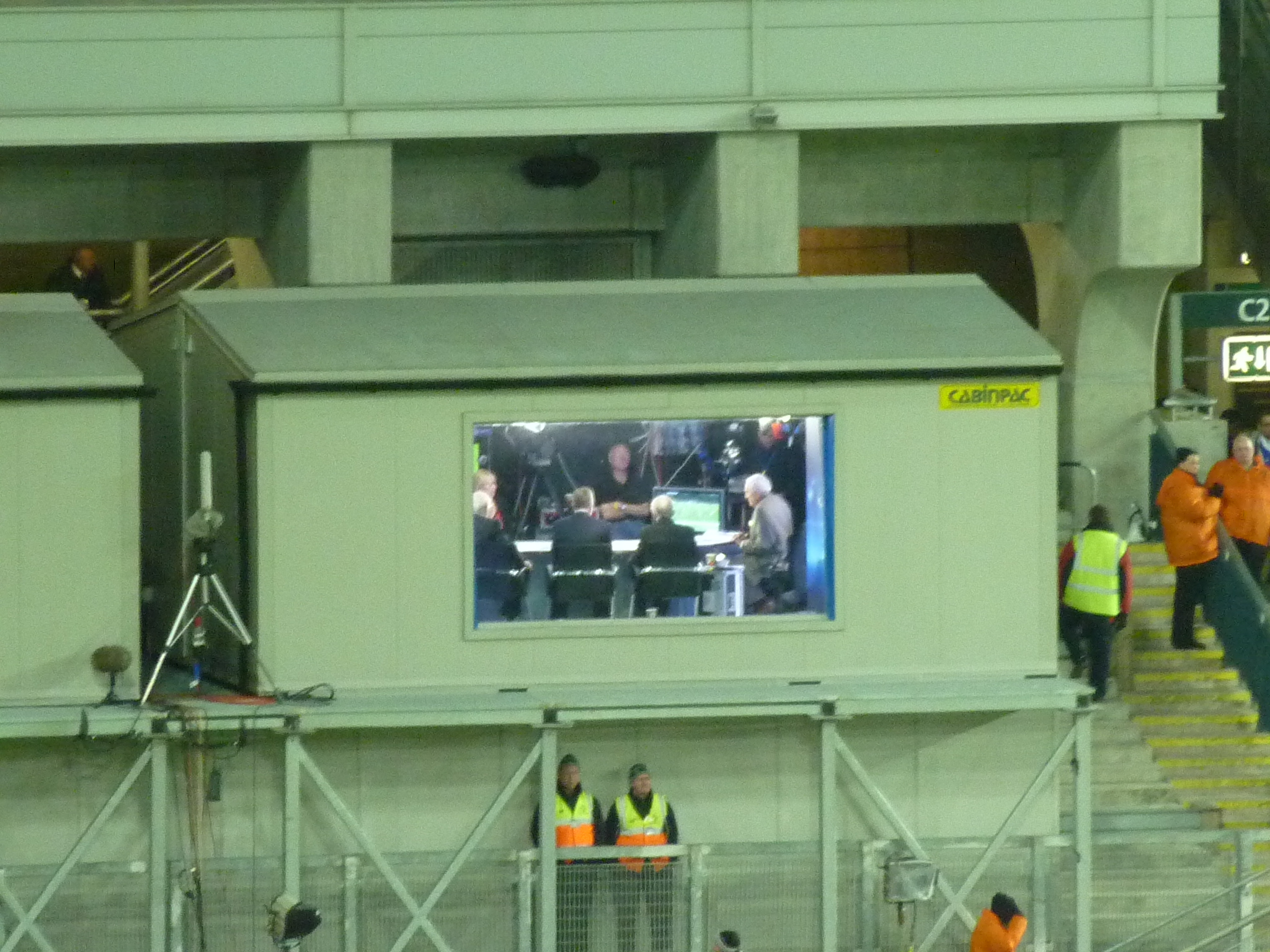
The RTÉ soccer panel at Croke Park

RTÉ Sport currently holds the rights to a large portfolio of football tournaments including:

- FIFA World Cup finals
- Republic of Ireland qualification matches for both World Cup finals and Euro finals
- UEFA Champions League (women's (final only, from 2019 to 2020) and men's)
- FIFA Club World Cup
- FAI Cup
- FAI Women's Cup Final
- UEFA Super Cup

The Republic of Ireland matches were shown live on the channel for Euro 2004, the 2006 World Cup and Euro 2008, all of which the team failed to qualify for. Sky Sports gained exclusive rights to Irish matches in the early 2000s and there were fears that national team matches could not be seen by fans, so the government stepped in and now all Irish home and away qualifying matches must be shown on Irish free-to-air television (RTÉ, Virgin One or TG4), and have remained on RTÉ as well as Sky Sports. Sky Sports held exclusive live rights to Irish home friendlies from 2000, with Premier Sports winning the rights from 2014, with highlights broadcast on either RTÉ or TV3.

RTÉ Sport broadcasts association football tournaments. It showed 64 live games (approximately 200 hours of programming) during the 2010 World Cup.

These were the team of association football pundits that RTÉ Sport announced ahead of the 2010 World Cup. Apart from Ossie Ardiles, Dietmar Hamann and Kevin Kilbane, both made their debuts, and Liam Brady, who left his post assisting Ireland manager Giovanni Trapattoni, the rest were all regulars on RTÉ Sport's association football programming. The 2010 FIFA World Cup was the ninth for both Bill O'Herlihy and George Hamilton.

For the 2014 World Cup, the RTÉ team was announced on 5 May 2014. The coverage was presented by Bill O'Herlihy, Darragh Maloney and Tony O'Donoghue. The pundits for the tournament were RTÉ regulars John Giles, Liam Brady, Eamon Dunphy, Kenny Cunningham, Richie Sadlier and Ronnie Whelan. Guest pundits joining the coverage included Didi Hamann, Ossie Ardiles, Neil Lennon and Brad Friedel. Play-by-play came from George Hamilton, John Kenny, Stephen Alkin and Adrian Eames while colour commentators included Ray Houghton, Trevor Steven, Jim Beglin and Brian Kerr.

This was Bill O'Herlihy's 11th and final World Cup for RTÉ. Hamann and Ardiles both worked for RTÉ at the last World Cup in 2010 while Lennon and Friedel both working for the BBC at the World Cup and Jim Beglin rejoined RTÉ after leaving ITV in 2013.

RTÉ provided live coverage of all live games of the UEFA Women's Euro 2022, the first time a major woman's football tournament was broadcast live in its entirety.

RTÉ cover at least one match per week from the FAI League, these matches are usually hosted by Peter Collins or Tony O'Donohue with guests from Irish football such as Richie Sadlier, Kenny Cunningham, Roddy Collins. Commentary comes from Stephen Alkin, Adrian Eames, John Kenny, Ger Canning or George Hamilton. The first live League of Ireland game was broadcast on RTÉ2 from Tolka Park between Shelbourne and Derry City during the 1996/97 season.

The Premiership was RTÉ's flagship Premier League programme until 2008, when Premier Soccer Saturday was launched. The Premiership was shown on Saturday nights at 19:30. There were sometimes Premiership Specials which would normally be shown on a Sunday evening at 20:00 or on a Monday night. These programmes are hosted usually by Darragh Maloney or Peter Collins with analysis mainly by Kenny Cunningham, Johnny Giles, Ronnie Whelan, Richie Sadlier, Liam Brady, Trevor Steven, Graeme Souness or Matt Holland. Premier Soccer Saturday was dropped from RTÉ's schedules from the 2013/14 season.

Presenters (usually one per game): Darragh Maloney, Peter Collins, Joanne Cantwell

Panels (usually two, three, or four per game): Liam Brady, Ronnie Whelan, Richie Sadlier, Denis Irwin, Ossie Ardiles, Dietmar Hamann, Kevin Kilbane, Brad Friedel, Paul Clement, Neil Lennon, Michael O'Neill

Commentators (usually two per game): George Hamilton, Ray Houghton, Gabriel Egan, Trevor Steven, Stephen Alkin, Damien Richardson, Adrian Eames, Matt Holland, Brian Kerr, Darragh Maloney

Former RTÉ Sport personnel: Bill O'Herlihy, Con Murphy, Jimmy Magee, Graeme Souness, John Giles, Eamon Dunphy,

The RTÉ Sport football division has achieved cult status due to its unintentional humour. The former main team of Bill O'Herlihy, Johnny Giles, Eamon Dunphy and Liam Brady was usually used for Irish matches and Champions League matches, with a usual big build up and long analysis afterwards which gain huge ratings.

=== Gaelic games ===
In 1926, RTÉ broadcast the first field game in Europe. The GAA match was broadcast live on the radio station 2RN, RTÉ's predecessor. RTÉ Sport is probably the second most significant of the categories since often hundreds of thousands would watch The Sunday Game, with probably more than a million watching on the day of the All-Ireland Final.

RTÉ GAA coverage is the cornerstone of their sports coverage. RTÉ previously held the exclusive rights for television and radio in the Republic for the entirety of the Championship compromising of interprovincial games, All-Ireland Qualifying games and the All-Ireland Championship series. The games were also available in Northern Ireland, who although able to see Ulster games on BBC Northern Ireland, did not receive the breadth of coverage as available on RTÉ. In 2008, however, TV3 won the rights to show ten Championship games, bringing an end to RTÉ's exclusivity. RTÉ though remain the sole broadcaster on radio and retained the All-Ireland series exclusively with forty championship games available on television. Games are also available online. RTÉ also show highlights of club and National League games on their Sunday Sport banner through the winter and spring. In 2011, under a new deal, BBC NI show all Ulster Championship matches, mostly Live and some deferred shown in full, as well as live coverage of the All-Ireland Championship if an Ulster team is playing. Under the 2011 deal, TV3 showed eleven matches, including both All-Ireland minor finals with coverage on TV3 in English and sister channel 3e in Irish. In 2014, a new deal was announced, with TV3 losing their coverage to Sky Sports. RTÉ keep their share of the matches but Sky has fourteen exclusive matches and other matches, such as the All-Ireland Semi Finals and Finals, which are shared between RTÉ and Sky. Under this deal BBC NI also get to show matches as long as RTÉ also cover them.

The All-Ireland Football Final traditionally attracts high ratings with it too attracting high ratings in previous years.

==== Coverage ====
The Apres Match comedy series features after many of RTÉ Sport's soccer matches.

RTÉ's championship games are broadcast through their The Sunday Game banner; for more information on their coverage see there.

Among other sports, RTÉ broadcasts the following on television (usually on RTÉ2):

- The Sunday Game – coverage of All-Ireland Senior Football Championship and All-Ireland Senior Hurling Championship games (May – September)
- League of Ireland Live – coverage of League of Ireland matches
- Against the Head – review and discussion of rugby union games
- RTÉ Racing – coverage of major Irish racing festivals
- Pro Box Live – coverage of professional boxing cards

Sports news bulletins are broadcast hourly on RTÉ 2fm under the title RTÉ Sport on 2fm.

=== Rugby union ===
RTÉ's coverage of rugby remains popular, underlined by the fact that Ireland's Grand Slam decider versus Wales was the overall top rated programme of 2009 with a 68% share of the total audience watching television with 866,000 viewers. The game was also shown on the widely available BBC One, but still ranks above other programmes exclusive to RTÉ.

In 2010 RTÉ bought the rights for Celtic League rugby with TG4, BBC Northern Ireland and BBC Alba. In 2014 Sky Sports signed a non-exclusive deal to cover the Pro 12, under the new contract TG4 continue to show the tournament free to air for Ireland, BBC Wales and S4C continue to cover the tournament in Wales, BBC Scotland return to cover the tournament alongside BBC Alba and BBC Northern Ireland cover all Ulster Matches not being Broadcast by Sky. Under this new deal RTÉ dropped the Pro12 Rugby but continue to show every game in the 6 Nations and all Ireland Autumn Internationals.

RTÉ showed the Heineken Cup for many years and after the coverage was snapped up by Sky Sports in 2004, RTÉ still showed Live coverage until 2007 and then highlights afterwards but in 2011 TG4 took their highlights coverage of the Heineken Cup, Amlin Cup to add to their Pro 12 coverage and Rugby World Cup highlights. As of 2014 RTÉ is the home of international rugby, holding rights to the Six Nations and Autumn Internationals, signing a deal with Sky Sports to cover Ireland Autumn Internationals.

The Rugby World Cup returned to RTÉ in 2011 after an eight-year absence, as the 2007 tournament was on TV3 Ireland. Their coverage was the same as TV3 in the sense they had only thirteen live matches, with every Irish match live and every match from the quarter-final onwards with Setanta holding every live match and TG4 had lucrative daytime deferred rights meaning they can show a full rerun of a match in the afternoon. RTÉ also broadcast highlights in primetime between 19:00 and 22:00 on RTÉ Two. Their live coverage was presented by Tom McGurk with analysis by Conor O'Shea, Brent Pope and George Hook. Highlights were presented by Daire O'Brien who hosts their Pro 12 coverage with analysis from Victor Costello, Shane Horgan, Frankie Shehan, Leinster coach Joe Schmidt and new signing from ESPN, Ben Kay who won the World Cup in 2003 with England. RTÉ Commentary team consists of Hugh Cahill, Ryle Nugent, Donal Lenihan, Tony Ward, Ralph Keyes and Kurt McQuilkin. George Hamilton was supposed to be part of commentary but he had a heart attack, so Darragh Maloney was instead commentating. Any highlights that did not have an RTÉ voiceover instead featured the World Feed, one example was in the highlights show with an England match using Sky Sports Commentators who worked for ITV in 2007, Miles Harrison and Stuart Barnes. RTÉ lost the rights to TV3 for the 2015 Rugby World Cup in England.

After they lost the rights to coverage of the Six Nations to TV3, RTE showed live Women's and U20's matches in 2018. Coverage was usually presented by Daire O'Brien, with analysis by the likes of Bernard Jackman and James Downey, with commentary from the normal team of Hugh Cahill, Donal Lenihan and more.

=== Golf ===
RTÉ holds exclusive Irish rights to live coverage of the only professional golf tournament to take place in Ireland, The Irish Open, covering every day's play Live. In 2011 they had play every day on RTÉ One and highlights on RTÉ Two late at night. Sky Sports also show all four days of the Irish Open live. RTÉ Radio also cover Saturday and Sunday's action live on Saturday and Sunday Sport.

=== Other sports ===
RTÉ also screen much horse racing, including the Galway Races and Punchestown, they have their own coverage for Irish racing with Treacy Piggott, but they take Channel 4 coverage when covering the Grand National, The Derby and the Cheltenham Festival. Sport is shown on RTÉ News.

A programme for the Beijing Olympics was shown on RTÉ Two before the games, called Ireland's Olympians. RTÉ broadcast most of Ireland's candidates for the gold medal during the Olympiad, as well as the finals in which no Irish athletes were competing.

From the 1970s through to 1997, RTÉ's flagship television sports programme was Sports Stadium, which provided live football and racing coverage on Saturday afternoons along with coverage of other sports and classified football results, in a similar manner to the BBC's Grandstand or ITV's World of Sport. The programme was badly hit by the loss of live rights to Saturday afternoon First Division matches after the beginning of the Premier League in 1992 and ended as part of RTÉ's revamp of Network 2 into N2 in 1997, being replaced for one year by Saturday Sports Live (which only concentrated on one single football or rugby game. Since 1998 RTÉ has not covered live sports on Saturday on a weekly basis on television, although major events such as the Six Nations Championship are still shown live.

For many years, RTÉ was the official broadcaster in Ireland of Formula One with its coverage presented by Peter Collins.

== Radio ==
RTÉ's regular radio sports programming (usually on RTÉ Radio 1) comprises:

- Saturday Sport – coverage of Premier League and other Saturday sports
- Sunday Sport – coverage of GAA and other Sunday sports

Sports news bulletins are broadcast hourly on RTÉ 2fm under the title RTÉ Sport on 2fm. RTÉ Sport also broadcasts an hour-long sports programme Game On from 7pm Monday – Friday on 2fm.

== Awards ==
RTÉ Sports, in conjunction with the Irish Sports Council, presents a number of awards annually - including in team of the year, manager of the year and sportsperson of the year categories.

At the 2012 event, when the RTÉ Sports Person of the Year award was being given to boxer Katie Taylor, viewers of the broadcast were instead shown an advertisement for the cosmetics and beauty company L'Oréal. This caused "uproar", with group head of sport at RTÉ, Ryle Nugent, apologising and stating that: "RTÉ sports awards offers sincere apologies for the technical issue at the end of tonight's programme. We're investigating how it happened".
