= Up for the Match =

Irish variety show

- Also known as: The Final Prospects; Up for the Final
- Genre: Light entertainment
- Directed by: Niamh White
- Presented by: Dáithí Ó Sé (2026-); Louise Cantillon (2026-); Jacqui Hurley (2019–); Gráinne Seoige (2008–2018); Des Cahill (2005–2025); Mary Kennedy (1999–2007); Liam Ó Murchú (1991–1996); Michael Lyster (1988–1990)
- Country of origin: Ireland
- Original language: English

Production
- Executive producer: Seán Ó Méalóid
- Production locations: Studio 4, RTÉ Television Centre, Donnybrook, Dublin 4
- Camera setup: Multi-camera
- Running time: 60-100 minutes

Original release
- Network: RTÉ One

Related
- The Sunday Game (1979–present)

Up for the Match is an Irish Gaelic games-themed variety show currently hosted by Dáithí Ó Sé, Louise Cantillon and Jacqui Hurley. The show is broadcast live in two editions each year on RTÉ One on the eve of the respective All-Ireland hurling and football finals. Up for the Match features a mixture of music and chat with special guests and experts from the world of Gaelic games. Despite the theme, Up for the Match is not part of RTÉ Sport, rather their entertainment division.

== History ==
Throughout the 1960s and early 1970s RTÉ's previews of the respective All-Ireland finals consisted of short reports on the main news programmes. In 1973 a new show called Sports Stadium, which itself was modeled on the BBC show Grandstand, went on the air. A special segment called Gaelic Stadium lasted for thirty minutes and previewed the big games of the weekend.

In 1974 RTÉ aired a special programme simply called The Hurling Show. It was the first ever eve-of-final non-sporting production by RTÉ Sport. Rather than just preview the teams and discuss their chances of success the live show was described as "an hour of entertainment, fun and nostalgia". Two weeks later Football Final Fanfare was broadcast in a similar vein. These were one-off specials as no eve-of-final shows were broadcast in 1975 and 1976.

From 1977 the chat show Trom agus Éadrom broadcast two special editions of the show every September in tribute to the following day's All-Ireland finals. The bi-lingual show, presented by Liam Ó Murchú, was broadcast live after the Nine O'Clock News and lasted for up to two hours. It featured discussion with former greats and current players as well as music. This format lasted until 1982.

For one season in 1983 the eve-of-final show was broadcast as part of a programme called Sports Preview.

The centenary year of the Gaelic Athletic Association in 1984 saw RTÉ broadcast a special programme live from the Premier Hall in Thurles, County Tipperary on the eve of the All-Ireland hurling final. Thurles, as the cradle town of the GAA, was chosen to host the centenary All-Ireland final. Fanfare for a Final was presented by Michael O'Hehir and featured Mick Dunne and Michael Lyster. It continued with the usual format of live chat and music.

Between 1985 and 1987 the build-up show was styled as All-Ireland Final Preview. Once again it was broadcast after the main evening news on the Saturday before the finals and featured a host of presenters including Michael Lyster, Mick Dunne, Ger Canning and Jim Carney.

The Final Prospects ran for three series between 1988 and 1990 and was presented solely by Michael Lyster.

In 1991 Liam Ó Murchú, who previously presented the special eve-of-final shows on Trom agus Éadrom, returned to present Up for the Final. Ostensibly the same format of chat and music continued under a different brand. Ó Murchú presented Up for the Final for six series until 1996.

For two years in 1997 and 1998 the pre-match build-up show was incorporated into Pat Kenny's flagship Saturday night chat show Kenny Live!.

The Kenny Live! format proved disjointed and Up for the Match returned in its own right in 1999 with Mary Kennedy as presenter. The show has aired every September since then. Des Cahill joined the show as co-presenter in 2005. Gráinne Seoige replaced Kennedy as co-presenter in 2008. Seoige stood down from the show in 2018, and Jacqui Hurley took over her role the following year in 2019.

On 18 July 2026, prior to the 2026 All-Ireland Hurling final, Up For The Match was broadcast live from Croke Park for the first time, with presenter Jacqui Hurley and new presenters Dáithí Ó Sé and Louise Cantillon. It was also broadcast at an earlier time than previously, from 8pm to 9:30pm, with the studio holding 300 supporters overlooking the pitch.

== Production ==
Up to 2025, Up for the Match was broadcast live from Studio 4 in the RTÉ Television Centre at Donnybrook, Dublin 4. As RTÉ's biggest, the studio holds 200 audience members. It was broadcast live from Croke Park for the first time in 2026.

== Format ==
Up for the Match features a mixture of music and chat with special guests and experts from the world of GAA offering their opinions on the upcoming game and stories of former clashes between the teams. The audience is made up of former players, officials and supporters of both teams taking part in the final, dressed usually in their respective team colours.
