= Weekend Sport =

Irish radio programme

- Genre: Sport
- Running time: 240 minutes
- Country of origin: Ireland
- Language: English
- Home station: RTÉ Radio 1
- Hosted by: Joanne Cantwell; Des Cahill; Darren Frehill
- Recording studio: Donnybrook, Dublin
- Original release: Present
- Audio format: FM and Digital radio

Weekend Sport is a Raidió Teilifís Éireann (RTÉ) radio programme broadcast at weekends on RTÉ Radio 1.

Saturday Sport is broadcast between 14:00 and 18:00 on Saturdays, although broadcast times are often extended depending on ongoing events, with Sunday Sport on air between 14:00 and 18:00.

Sunday Sport has been on air since 1971 and was first presented by Paddy O'Brien. Other presenters throughout its history have included Liam Nolan, Bill O'Herlihy, Eamonn Ó'Muirí, Jimmy Magee, Adrian Eames and Jacqui Hurley.

Saturday Sport is presented by Joanne Cantwell and Des Cahill. Sunday Sport is presented by Des Cahill and Darren Frehill. Many RTÉ Sports reporters and producers, such as Barry O'Neill, also contribute.

Saturday Sport is Ireland's most listened to radio sports programme, drawing a weekly audience of 226,000, whilst 211,000 tune in to Sunday Sport weekly.

== Commentators and reporters ==
- GAA - Pauric Lodge, Marty Morrissey, Liam Aherne, Ger Canning, Darragh Maloney, Adrian Eames, John Kenny, Damien O'Meara, Angelina Nugent, Siobhan Madigan, Martin Kiely, Pat Costello, Owen McConnon, Mike McCartney, Cathal Mullaney, Patrick Mulcahy, Sean Perry.
- Rugby - Michael Corcoran, Gary Moran, Neil Treacy,
- Soccer - John Kenny, Adrian Eames, Siobhan Madigan.
- Horse racing - Brendan McArdle, Eoghain Ward.
- Golf - Greg Allen.

== Pundits ==
- GAA - John Mullane, Shane McGrath, Davy Fitzgerald, Kyle Coney, John Casey, Denise Masterson, Brian Carroll, Conleth Gilligan, Brendan Deveney, Kate Kelly.
- Rugby - Donal Lenihan, Bernard Jackman, Grace Davitt, Fiona Coghlan, Shane Byrne, Ian Keatley, James Downey.
- Soccer - Alan Cawley, Paul Corry, Pat Fenlon, Stephen Elliott, Keith Long, Keith Treacy, Stephen Kelly.
- Horse racing - Nina Carberry.
- Golf - Gary Murphy.

== See also ==
- RTÉ Sport
