= Play It Again Des =

- Genre: Sport
- Presented by: Des Cahill
- Country of origin: Ireland
- Original language: English
- No. of series: 3
- No. of episodes: 23

Production
- Production locations: RTÉ Television Centre, Donnybrook, Dublin 4, Ireland
- Camera setup: Multi-camera
- Running time: 40-50 minutes

Original release
- Network: RTÉ One
- Release: 24 July 2003 – 1 September 2005

Play it Again Des was an Irish sports chat show produced by RTÉ for two series. The show was presented by Des Cahill and featured top sports personalities in discussion about their favourite sporting moments.

== Format ==
The first series of Play it Again Des saw Des Cahill in conversation with three special sporting guests. Each of these special guests would highlight their own favourite sporting memory. A clip from archive footage would then be played. For the second series the number of special guests was reduced to two. The first show of the second series, however, saw Eamon Dunphy being interviewed by himself. The last episode of the second series featured no special guests. Instead the public were allowed to vote for their favourite sporting memory. The third and final series followed the same format of the Dunphy programme from the first show of the second series. Now, one special guest highlighted particular moments from their own careers.

== Broadcasts ==
=== First series ===
Show	Date	Special guests
1	24 July 2003	Eamon Coghlan, Paul McGrath, Michael Carruth
2	31 July 2003	Micheál Ó Muircheartaigh, Moss Keane, Joe Kernan
3	7 August 2003	Ken Doherty, Ted Walsh, Ollie Campbell
4	14 August 2003	Seán Boylan, Tracy Piggott, Niall Quinn
5	21 August 2003	Mick O'Dwyer, Brian Kerr, Mick Doyle
6	28 August 2003	Eoin Liston, Nicky English, Liam Griffin
7	4 September 2003	Paddy Cullen, John Treacy, Mary Peters

=== Second series ===
Show	Date	Special guests
1	8 July 2004	Eamon Dunphy
2	15 July 2004	Kevin Moran, Tony Ward
3	22 July 2004	Ger Loughnane, Christy O'Connor Jnr
4	29 July 2004	George Hook, Jack O'Shea
5	5 August 2004	Mick Galwey, Pat Spillane
6	12 August 2004	Dermot Weld, George Hamilton
7	19 August 2004	Colm O'Rourke, Catherina McKiernan
8	26 August 2004	

=== Third series ===
Show	Date	Special guest
1	14 July 2005	Ronnie Whelan
2	21 July 2005	Jimmy Barry-Murphy
3	28 July 2005	Johnny Giles
4	4 August 2005	Eddie Keher
5	11 August 2005	Liam Brady
6	18 August 2005	Eamon Coghlan
7	25 August 2005	Tony Hanahoe
8	1 September 2005	Fergus Slattery
