= Sports Stadium =

- Genre: Sport
- Presented by: Brendan O'Reilly; Liam Nolan; Fred Cogley; Bill O'Herlihy; George Hamilton; Michael Lyster; Tracy Piggott; Noel Reid; Peter Collins; Jim Sherwin
- Opening theme: "The Final Countdown" by Europe (from 1988)
- Composers: Joey Tempest; Kevin Elson
- Country of origin: Ireland
- Original language: English

Production
- Production locations: RTÉ Television Centre, Donnybrook, Dublin 4, Ireland
- Editors: Max Mulvihill; Stephen Alkin
- Camera setup: Multi-camera
- Running time: Various
- Production company: RTÉ (Raidió Teilefís Éireann)

Original release
- Network: RTÉ (1973–1978); RTÉ 1 (1978–1997); Network Two (1990s)
- Release: 22 September 1973 – 20 December 1997

Sports Stadium is a long-running Irish television sport programme produced by RTÉ (Raidió Teilifís Éireann) . Broadcast between 1973 and 1997, it was the broadcaster's flagship sports programme and one of its longest-running programmes. It ran in a variety of slots, but in its final years aired on Network Two on Saturdays from 13:00-18:00.

Its first presenter was Brendan O'Reilly, who stayed with the programme into the 1990s. Other presenters during its run included Liam Nolan, Fred Cogley, Michael Lyster, George Hamilton, Noel Reid, Peter Collins and Tracy Piggott, who went on to front Sports Stadium's short-lived successor Saturday Sports Live.

The format of the show was very similar to the BBC's Grandstand or ITV's World of Sport – Grandstand's racing coverage was often simulcast by Sports Stadium, presented by Noel Reid before Piggott's arrival in 1994. The earlier part of each show would feature a mixture of racing and recorded highlights of other sports. The centrepiece of the afternoon for many years was a live 3pm English First Division game, which would be followed by the classified football results read by Brendan Delany, who worked on the show throughout its entire run.

Live cross-channel soccer was featured for a short time during the mid-1970s but returned between 1985 and 1992. Following the creation of the Premier League in 1992, tape-delayed coverage of full matches continued for a further three years following a delayed-coverage agreement with the new Premier League. The FA Cup was also featured annually on RTÉ until 1998, when live rights to the final were secured by Sky Sports.

On 15 April 1989, Sports Stadium aired live coverage of the FA Cup semi-final tie between Liverpool and Nottingham Forest at Hillsborough Stadium in Sheffield, and the unfolding disaster when 97 Liverpool fans were killed as the pens in the terraces became overcrowded and fans began to spill onto the pitch.

Coverage of the AIL was also featured on the show, along with live coverage of the Five Nations Championship and the Lions rugby tours.

Other key segments of the programme included Soccer Stadium (covering domestic League of Ireland football) and Gaelic Stadium – previews of the weekend's GAA games presented by Mick Dunne.

There were regular rallying highlights from such events as the Circuit of Ireland Rally, Ulster Rally and Rally of the Lakes, along with live coverage of athletics events such as the IAAF World Cross Country Championships, plus highlights of domestic Grand Prix races and the Cork City Sports and Morton Games.

Three theme tunes were used during the programme's run. The first, a catchy brass-led theme composed by Brian Bennett called "Thrilling Spectacle", ran from 1973 to 1987, replaced for one year by a heavy rock intro. From 1988 onwards (beginning with the 1988 European Championship final between Netherlands and the USSR), the programme used the distinctive keyboard riff from the Europe song "The Final Countdown", which had been a Number 1 hit in 25 countries, including Ireland, in 1986. The original recording was used from 1988, but a re-arranged version was used from 1993.

Another significant musical aspect was an instrumental clip from Don Henley’s ‘Boys of Summer which was used to accompany the introductory part of the show.

The last edition of Sports Stadium was broadcast on 20 December 1997.
