= Simon Young =

Simon Young may refer to:

- Simon Young (magistrate) (1823–1893), magistrate of the Pitcairn Islands
- Simon Young (presenter) (1959–2021), Irish radio and television presenter
- Simon Young (mayor) (born 1965), Pitcairnese politician, 7th mayor of Pitcairn Islands
- Simon Young (solicitor), Falkland Islands Attorney General in the Legislative Assembly of the Falkland Islands
