= Roddy Collins =

Irish footballer & manager (born 1960)

Personal information
- Date of birth: 7 August 1960 (age 66)
- Place of birth: Dublin, Ireland
- Height: 6 ft 2 in (1.88 m)
- Position: Forward

Youth career
- Stella Maris
- Bohemians

Senior career*
Years	Team	Apps	(Gls)
1979–1981	Bohemians	30	(2)
1981–1982	Home Farm	5	(2)
1982–1983	Bohemians	?	(0)
1983–1984	Athlone Town	?	(11)
1984–1985	Drogheda United	?	(10)
1985–1986	Dundalk	9	(2)
1986–1987	Mansfield Town	16	(1)
1987–1988	Newport County	7	(1)
1988	Cheltenham Town	6	(0)
1988–1989	Shamrock Rovers	22	(8)
1989–1991	Dundalk	7	(1)
1991	Sligo Rovers	6	(0)
1991	Glentoran	10	(1)
1991–1994	Crusaders	99	(40)
1993	→ Bohemians (loan)	?	(?)
1994–1995	Bangor	24	(5)
1995	Coleraine	?	(?)
1995	Cliftonville	?	(1)
1995	Bohemians	0	(0)
1996	Home Farm	8	(1)
1996	Larne	1	(0)
1996–1997	St. Francis	?	(?)

Managerial career
- 1995: Bangor (player-manager)
- 1998–2001: Bohemians
- 2001–2002: Carlisle United
- 2002–2003: Carlisle United
- 2004: Dublin City
- 2004–2005: Shamrock Rovers
- 2009: Floriana
- 2010: Cork City
- 2011–2012: Monaghan United
- 2013: Athlone Town
- 2014: Derry City
- 2015–2016: Waterford United
- 2017–2018: Athlone Town
- * Club domestic league appearances and goals

Roderick Collins (born 7 August 1960) is an Irish former professional football player and manager.

During a playing career of 18 years, Collins played for many sides across England, Republic of Ireland and Northern Ireland. While towards the end of his career he became a joint-manager and player, Collins eventually turned his hand entirely to management. He managed Bohemians, the side he started his career at and played for during four spells throughout his career, before moving to England to manage Carlisle. After several successful spells in Ireland and one in Malta, Collins is currently unemployed.

== Playing career ==
Collins was born in Dublin. He played for the youth teams of Stella Maris FC, where in 1977 he was scouted and went on trial with Fulham FC, Wolverhampton Wanderers and Arsenal FC.

He made his competitive debut for Bohemians in a FAI League Cup tie against St Patrick's Athletic on 26 August 1979, which they lost on penalties. The game at Dalymount Park had ended scoreless with Collins being one that had his spot kick saved. His League of Ireland debut came on 9 September on the opening day of the 1979–80 season at Finn Harps. Ten days later he made his European debut at the Estádio José Alvalade against Sporting Clube de Portugal in the UEFA Cup.

He suffered a serious leg injury which sidelined him for almost two years before going on to play for Home Farm. After another spell at Bohemians, he joined Athlone Town, where he scored in the 1983–84 European Cup against Standard Liège. He also scored Athlone's goal in their 1984 FAI League Cup final loss to Drogheda United. He then moved to Drogheda United before joining Dundalk for six months.

In January 1986, Collins signed for Mansfield Town for a transfer fee said to be in excess of £10,000 He left to join Newport County in August 1987, playing seven times in an injury-plagued 1987–88 season which would see Newport lose their place in the Football League amid a growing financial crisis. Collins then went on to play once for Cheltenham Town.

Noel King signed Collins for Shamrock Rovers in September 1988 and he made a scoring debut against Bohemians on 30 September in a 3–1 derby win. He also scored in his last game for the club at Cork City on 21 April 1989. He was Rovers' top scorer for the 1988–89 season.

Collins subsequently joined for Dundalk, playing twice for them in the 1989-90 UEFA Cup.

He later played for Sligo Rovers, Crusaders (with whom he won the County Antrim Shield and was leading scorer in his first season), Glentoran, Bangor, Coleraine, Cliftonville, Larne and Home Farm. He scored once for Cliftonville in the 1995–96 season, and he made one Leinster Senior Cup appearance for Bohemians in December 1995. His last club was St Francis, where he played in their first ever game in senior football in a League of Ireland Shield game in September 1996.

== Management career ==
Collins' first foray into management came at Bangor in 1994/95 which despite saving them from relegation, was relatively brief. After Nigel Best resigned Collins' first managerial game was a 1–1 draw at home to Larne on 28 January 1995.

=== Bohemians ===
In 1998, he found himself thrust into the spotlight when he was surprisingly appointed as Joe McGrath's successor at Bohemians.

Bohemians were a side which, despite being tipped as outside contenders for the title at the start of the year, were facing a relegation dogfight when Collins arrived in the 1998–99 season. Collins' start to his reign as Bohs' manager was relatively impressive, and new signings such as Kevin Hunt eventually dragged the side out of relegation trouble and to safety. However, a poor run of results at the end of the season saw the Gypsies, which has never been outside of the top tier of Irish football, plummet back into relegation trouble, and were forced to take part in a play-off with Cobh Ramblers. Bohemians won the play-off convincingly, 7–0 on aggregate. He remained as manager during the close-season, though he was under pressure from both the supporters and the committee at Bohemians.

During the close-season Collins oversaw a massive change in personnel at the club, with old stalwarts such as Brian Mooney, Tommy Byrne (footballer) and Peter Hanrahan being released, and new signings such as Glen Crowe, Mark Dempsey, Wayne Russell and Avery John coming in. Bohemians started the season brightly, and it was evident that this side would not be fighting relegation. Bohemians eventually finished 3rd in the league, and were beaten in a replay of the final of the FAI Cup by Shelbourne FC.

The following season, 2000–01, was to become one of the most remarkable, and controversial, in the history of Bohemians. Collins again brought in several new players during the summer break, with Simon Webb, Dave Hill among others joining record signing Trevor Molloy at the club.

Bohemians' opening game was an away tie in the UEFA Cup against Aberdeen FC, which was to be the first time that the club had fielded a starting eleven consisting entirely of full-time professional players. Despite being written off by the local press, Bohs produced one of the all-time great Irish performances in Europe to come from a goal down to defeat the Scots by two goals to one. Bohemians were reduced to 10 men after 45 minutes and were beaten 1–0 in the return leg, due to an own-goal, but progressed on the away goals rule and faced German giants Kaiserslautern in the next round

Despite putting in an impressive display, Bohemians who were again reduced to 10 men on the 43rd minute were beaten 3–1 in Tolka Park in the first leg, and suffered from some careless defensive lapses and a controversial red card. In Germany, Bohemians shocked the hosts by winning 1–0 thanks to a goal from Glen Crowe, and were unlucky not to score more (even having a goal ruled out for off-side). Bohemians were out of Europe, and had made history by achieving successive away victories in European competition. It was at this time in his career that Collins was rumoured to have applied for a job with Dublin Corporation as a traffic warden to escape the hectic lifestyle of football.

In the league that season, Bohs were showing good form, though with Glen Crowe emerging as a phenomenal goal-scorer and Kevin Hunt marshalling the midfield. Once out of Europe, results began to dip, and Collins found himself under pressure. Shelbourne were clear leaders at the top, and a huge investment in the Bohemians playing side looked set to fail to reap just rewards. In January 2001, Collins was under huge pressure as Bohemians travelled to Santry to take on fierce rivals Shamrock Rovers. At half time, Bohemians were trailing the game by 3 goals, as Rovers scored 4 to Bohs 1. It looked certain that a new manager would be appointed following the game. However, in one of the most remarkable come-backs in Irish football, Bohemians put 5 past a shell-shocked Rovers side in the second half and won 6–4. That result, coupled with a break for several weeks due to the foot and mouth outbreak in the UK and Ireland, gave Bohemians the momentum to mount a late challenge for the league.

Bohemians went into the last game of the season trailing Shelbourne by one point, as the Gypsies travelled to Kilkenny on the final day. Meanwhile, Shelbourne were hosting Cork City in a game which the hosts were expected to win comfortably. To win the league, Bohemians needed to win and hope that Cork could achieve at least a draw in Tolka. Bohemians won 5–0, while Cork shocked Shelbourne by defeating them on their home patch. Bohemians were crowned champions, and the aftermath of the result would shape the rest of Collins' career.

=== Fall out from Bohemians ===
The following weekend Bohemians beat Longford Town in the FAI Cup Final thus securing their first double in 75 years, a remarkable achievement. The club also recorded a profit for the first time in 20 yrs. After this Collins was supposedly set to discuss a new contract with the Bohemians committee. During this time the club announced that Pete Mahon would be taking over the reins at Bohemians. This ended Collins' association with the club.

To the present day Collins' name is sure to spark intense debate amongst the Bohemians faithful, with some fans opposing and supporting the former manager. He managed the club for 96 league games – winning 46, drawing 23 and losing 27. They scored 136 times, conceded 81 and kept 41 clean sheets.

=== Drogheda United takeover ===
In early July 2001 Collins expressed an interest in forming a consortium to take over one of his former clubs Drogheda United. His role as consultant did not last long as he was appointed manager of Carlisle weeks later.

=== Carlisle United ===
Collins was appointed as manager of Carlisle United in July 2001 signing a two-year contract. A club that was under financial embargo with only 8 senior professional players and bookies favourites for relegation, was 14th in the league by April their highest position in 5 seasons. Collins was sacked in April 2002 after stating that he would resign unless owner Michael Knighton completed the sale of the club as promised to the investor John Courtenay (chairman).

Courtenay finally took control of the club in July 2002 and instantly reappointed Collins as manager. Due to the long drawn out completion of the sale Collins worked with a weakened squad. He again though retained their League status and took them to Cardiff's Millennium Stadium for the 2002–03 Football League Trophy final. Conceding goals in the last 12 minutes by Liam Rosenior and Lee Peacock, Carlisle lost 2–0 to Bristol City with a 50 000 attendance at the game.

=== Dublin City ===
In July 2004 he took over as manager of Dublin City, but left in November 2004 three weeks from the end of the season to manage Shamrock Rovers.

=== Shamrock Rovers ===
As manager of Shamrock Rovers, Collins struggled both on and off the pitch. Following a points deduction because the club presented fraudulent documents to the FAI licensing committee, after a season of poor results and in-fighting at the club, Shamrock Rovers faced relegation. Collins was first suspended for a week in November 2005 pending the resolution of an internal investigation. After Rovers were relegated for the first time ever Collins' contract was terminated. He later brought a claim of unfair dismissal against Shamrock Rovers to the Employment Appeals Tribunal in Dublin, the case was settled out of court in November 2006.

=== Post Rovers ===
In 2006, he applied for the vacant Glentoran job. In his weekly column he continues to question the merits of the league while ironically also being retained as a pundit for the national broadcaster for live league games. In March 2008, Collins profile as a soccer pundit was raised higher in Irish football media circles through his weekly appearances on Irish state broadcaster, Radio Telefís Éireann, in their weekly league review television show, Monday Night Soccer. Collins was named as the man heading an Irish consortium to purchase SPL club Gretna on 15 March 2008 following the club's financial crisis and possible closure. A week later (21 March 2008) Collins and his consortium were also in talks to take over at cash strapped Rotherham United, a football club in Football League Two.

Collins was appointed General Manager of Scottish side Livingston in April 2008.

=== Floriana ===
On 30 June 2009, Collins was unveiled as the new Manager of Maltese Premier side Floriana F.C. At the media conference, held in the Embassy of Malta in Dublin, Collins stated his delight at returning to the dugout and the large media presence was unheard of for a Maltese club. Floriana's Development Officer, Mr. Alan Moore, thanked everyone for being present on such a great occasion for the club and this was echoed

However an even greater unveiling took place in Floriana itself the very next day. After meeting his players for the first time Roddy was part of Maltese football history. Never before had such an event taken place on the islands where a manager was introduced to the fans. Introduced by Tony Zahra he spoke alongside new President John Camillieri, John Borg, Dominic Mc Donnell and Alan Moore, receiving massive applause for pledging himself to making Floriana F.C. a force to be reckoned with. The fans appreciated his honesty and applauded in agreement when he told them that "we are embarking on a long term project, all of us will stand together and make this club greater still!"

Having worked as a pundit for Radio Telefís Éireann, Newstalk Radio and The Star on Sunday, Collins began pre-season with Floriana F.C. on 2 July 2009. The club are also known as "The Irish" and footballing partners of, his former club, Shamrock Rovers and Russian side FC Volga Ulyanovsk. Collins had a very shaky start to his time in Floriana winning only 1 pre-season game and none of his first 3 competitive games including a humiliating 6–0 loss to eternal rivals Valletta F.C.. However just before he left the club he had guided the team to 7 unbeaten games.

=== Cork City ===
On 15 December 2009, Collins suddenly announced his departure from Floriana FC and returned to the League of Ireland to take charge of Cork City, where it was announced that he had signed a 12-month contract on 23 December 2009. Collins spoke of his delight at the appointment and said that it was a job he had wanted "for many years". In February 2010 the holding company Cork City Investments Fc Ltd. was wound up and he was not reappointed. Collins didn't manage a single competitive game with Cork City.

=== Monaghan United ===
In March 2011 Collins was appointed manager of First Division Monaghan United. He has achieved promotion to the Premier Division in his first season at the Mons. After a poor start to the 2012 season, whilst lying in last position in the league table, on 18 June 2012, Monaghan United announced their withdrawal from the League of Ireland citing financial reasons as the main factor in their decision. Collins was released as a free agent.

His son, also Roddy, made his debut in the EA Sports Cup.

=== Athlone Town ===
On 22 November 2012, Collins was named as the new manager of First Division side Athlone Town, and in his first season guided them to the League of Ireland First Division title in September 2013

However, in November 2013 in a club statement it was revealed that Collins had "requested his P45" and had left the club.

=== Derry City ===
On 19 November 2013, Collins was named as the new manager of Derry City.

On 11 May 2014 it was announced on the Derry City website that Derry City and Roddy Collins had departed by mutual consent.

=== Waterford United ===
After taking charge of Waterford United in the 2015 season, he led them to 7th in his first league season. After signing players he was more familiar with in the 2016 season his squad showed some early promising signs at the start of the season but many on and off the field problems caused disharmony and with two games left in the season Collins parted ways with Waterford United

=== Athlone Town ===
On 12 May 2017, Collins was appointed as the head coach of Athlone Town, a role which he held until February 2018.

== Broadcasting & Commentating ==
On 6 June 2014, Dublin radio station Radio Nova announced that Collins and broadcaster Con Murphy had signed to present a new World Cup phone-in programme for the duration of the 2014 tournament.

== Personal life ==
He is the brother of former world champion boxer, Steve Collins. His son Roddy Collins Jr. was a League of Ireland footballer who played for Athlone Town, Derry City and Waterford United.

== Honours ==
=== Manager ===
Bohemians

- League of Ireland Premier Champions: 2000-01
- FAI Cup: 2001
- League of Ireland Cup: 1999-2000

Carlisle United

- Football League Trophy runner-up: 2002–03

Monaghan United

- League of Ireland First Division: 2011

Athlone Town

- League of Ireland First Division: 2013
