= Lifelines (TV series) =

Irish television chat show

- Genre: Light entertainment
- Presented by: Liam Ó Murchú
- Country of origin: Ireland
- Original language: English
- No. of series: 4
- No. of episodes: 36

Production
- Production locations: RTÉ Television Centre, Donnybrook, Dublin 4
- Running time: 65–75 minutes

Original release
- Network: RTÉ One
- Release: 18 June 1993 – 31 March 1996

Lifelines is an Irish television chat show presented by broadcaster Liam Ó Murchú. Filmed in front of a studio audience, each programme is devoted to a special celebrity guest. The programme ran for four series from 1993 until 1996.

== History ==
Lifelines was initially devised as an appropriate summer replacement for RTÉ's flagship Friday night chat show The Late Late Show. The show was presented by Liam Ó Murchú, the former host of Trom agus Éadrom, a bi-lingual chat show that was broadcast in the 1970s and 1980s. The first series began on 18 June 1993 and featured seven episodes. Lifelines proved popular and returned for a second series of seven episodes on 17 April 1994. By now the show was given its own timeslot on Sunday evenings straight after the Nine O'Clock News. It complemented RTÉ's two other chat shows, The Late Late Show and Kenny Live, which were broadcast on Friday and Saturday nights respectively. A third series of Lifelines returned on 16 April 1995 and lasted for an extended run of ten episodes. The fourth and final series began on 7 January 1996 and ran for twelve episodes.

=== Production ===
The first three series of Lifelines were broadcast from Studio 1 in the RTÉ Television Centre at Donnybrook, Dublin 4. As RTÉ's biggest at the time, the studio held 120 audience members. The final series of the show was broadcast from Studio 4, a new studio specifically adapted to cater for large productions. The size of the audience also increased to 200.

=== Format ===
Lifelines featured a special guest in profile every week. The show featured interviews with the special guest and their friends, as well as live music from guest music groups. The show was described as This Is Your Life without the surprise.

== Episodes ==
=== Series 1 (1993) ===
No. overall	No. in season	Special guest(s)	Original release date
1	1	The O'Regan family	18 June 1993
2	2	The Marcus family	25 June 1993
3	3	Clannad	2 July 1993
4	4	Sam McAughtry	9 July 1993
5	5	Sandy Kelly	16 July 1993
6	6	Michael Carruth	23 July 1993
7	7	Frank Patterson	30 July 1993

=== Series 2 (1994) ===
No. overall	No. in season	Special guest(s)	Original release date
8	1	John McNally	17 April 1994
9	2	Eleanor McEvoy	24 April 1994
10	3	Maureen Potter	1 May 1994
11	4	The All Priests Show	8 May 1994
12	5	Paddy Cole's Jazz Scene	15 May 1994
13	6	The Clancy Brothers	22 May 1994
14	7	Phil Coulter	29 May 1994

=== Series 3 (1995) ===
No. overall	No. in season	Special guest(s)	Original release date
15	1	Maureen Toal	16 April 1995
16	2	Pete St. John	23 April 1995
17	3	Eileen Reid	30 April 1995
18	4	Eurovision winners special	7 May 1995
19	5	David Ervine	14 May 1995
20	6	Brídín Twist	21 May 1995
21	7	Michael Collins special	28 May 1995
22	8	Eamon Kelly	11 June 1995
23	9	Philomena Begley	18 June 1995
24	10	Jack Boothman	25 June 1995

=== Series 4 (1996) ===
No. overall	No. in season	Special guest(s)	Original release date
25	1	Mick Lally	7 January 1996
26	2	Tony Ward	14 January 1996
27	3	Susan McCann	21 January 1996
28	4	Brendan Kennelly	28 January 1996
29	5	Catherine McGuinness	4 February 1996
30	6	Twink	11 February 1996
31	7	Fred O'Donovan	18 February 1996
32	8	Mary O'Rourke	25 February 1996
33	9	Mick Clerkin	10 March 1996
34	10	St. Patrick's Day special	17 March 1996
35	11	Frank Feely	24 March 1996
36	12	Stockton's Wing	31 March 1996
