= Fred Cogley =

Irish sports commentator and television presenter

- Born: Fredrick Victor Cogley; 27 June 1934; Dublin, Ireland
- Died: 14 June 2017 (aged 82); Terenure, Dublin, Ireland
- Occupations: Sports journalist, broadcaster
- Years active: 1950–1999
- Employer: RTÉ
- Known for: Rugby commentary; presenter of Sports Stadium
- Television: Sports Stadium
- Spouse: Madeline White
- Children: 4
- Relatives: Daisy Bannard Cogley (grandmother)

Fredrick Victor Cogley (27 June 1934 – 14 June 2017) was an Irish sports journalist and broadcaster. He worked for Raidió Éireann and later RTÉ for almost half a century, serving as the broadcaster's head of sport and as presenter of its flagship television programme Sports Stadium. Over his career he covered eleven Summer Olympic Games and twelve association football World Cups, but he was best known as the "voice of Irish rugby".

== Early life and family ==
Cogley was born on 27 June 1934 in Dublin, the only child of Muriel (née Costigan) and Mitchel Cogley. His father was a sports journalist with the Irish Press and later sports editor of the Irish Independent. His grandmother was the theatrical figure Daisy Bannard Cogley, who was involved in the founding of Dublin's Gate Theatre.

He was educated at St Mary's College, Rathmines, where he represented the school at rugby, cricket and athletics. He played out-half for two seasons on the senior cup team and was selected for the Leinster schools in the interprovincial series, and he also played cricket for Ireland at schoolboy level.

== Career ==
=== Journalism and early broadcasting ===
Cogley made his radio debut in 1950, at the age of 16, as an occasional contributor to the Raidió Éireann programme Sports Stadium, which was presented by Éamonn Andrews. He trained as a sports sub-editor at The Irish Times from 1953 and moved to the Evening Herald in 1956. He became Irish sports correspondent for the Daily Telegraph, a role he held for around 30 years.

When Telefís Éireann began broadcasting at the end of 1961 he moved into television, and he was appointed sports editor of the station in 1963. He went on to serve as RTÉ's head of sport for 27 years. From 1973 to 1997 he presented Sports Stadium, RTÉ's flagship Saturday afternoon television sports programme.

=== Rugby commentary ===
By the early 1960s Cogley had become RTÉ's leading rugby commentator, and for close to half a century his was the voice associated with Ireland's rugby coverage, including the Five Nations Championship. He was often compared to Bill McLaren of the BBC and to Michael O'Hehir, the voice of Gaelic games. In all he covered 49 seasons of rugby.

His first overseas rugby assignment came in 1967, when he was one of only three Irish journalists to travel with the Ireland team on its first tour of Australia. Ireland won the Test in Sydney by 11 points to 5, and Cogley later recalled the trip as among his happiest memories. After retiring from RTÉ in 1999 he continued to commentate on rugby for Setanta.

=== Other work ===
Cogley wrote a weekly column for the Sunday Telegraph for several years and edited Fred Cogley's Rugby Annual in the 1970s. In 2000 he wrote the centenary history of St Mary's College Rugby Club. His memoir, Voices from My Past, written with the journalist Des Berry, was published in 2012.

== Personal life ==
Cogley married Madeline White at St Joseph's Church, Terenure, in 1958. They had four children, David, Niall, Michelle and Denise, and seven grandchildren. His son Niall Cogley also worked as a broadcaster, serving as head of sport at RTÉ before joining Setanta and later TV3. His granddaughter Clodagh Cogley was among those injured in the 2015 Berkeley balcony collapse.

Cogley died on 14 June 2017 at the age of 82. His funeral mass was held at St Joseph's Church in Terenure. Tributes were paid by figures across Irish sport and broadcasting, with the then RTÉ head of sport Ryle Nugent describing him as the "sound track to a generation of TV rugby".
