= Jacqui Hurley =

Irish sports broadcaster

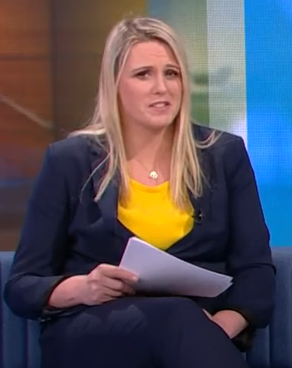
- Hurley in 2020
- Born: Jacqueline Hurley; 15 January 1984 (age 42); County Cork, Ireland
- Education: Media and Communications
- Alma mater: Mary Immaculate College, Limerick
- Occupation: Sports broadcaster
- Employer: Raidió Teilifís Éireann (RTÉ)
- Spouse: Shane McMahon
- Children: 2
- Website: Jackie Sports Blog

Jacqui Hurley (born 15 January 1984) is an Irish sports broadcaster and chat show host employed by RTÉ, Ireland's national radio and television station, where she is a regular sports news presenter on RTÉ News and presents The Sunday Game highlights programme and co-presents Up for the Match alongside Des Cahill. She co-presented Sunday Sport on RTÉ Radio 1 from 2009 to 2023. Hurley played at the highest Irish level in the sports of basketball and camogie and currently manages the Irish under-16 girls basketball team.

== Early life ==
Hurley grew up in Australia in the 1980s. She is the daughter of David and Mairead Hurley and sister of Catriona and Sean. She played basketball for Ireland and camogie for Cork and has since taken on a management role with the Irish under-16 female basketball team. She is a sports enthusiast. She graduated from Mary Immaculate College (MIC) in 2006 with a degree in Media and Communication Studies. She has webbed toes, a feature of her anatomy which she has openly discussed on radio. She was paralysed for several days when she was 17 due to a sports accident after she and another player crashed into each other.

== Career ==
=== Television ===
Hurley initially spent some time as an intern with CBS Television in Mississippi, United States. She also worked in local radio before joining RTÉ in 2006. She was only supposed to stay with CBS for eight months but she remained for a year, developing her love of sports broadcasting.

Hurley's RTÉ television work includes reports for the sports magazine OB Sport, a Friday preview slot on the daytime chat show Seoige, the weekly "60 Sixty" segment on the League of Ireland magazine programme Monday Night Soccer aired on RTÉ Two, where she questions a different footballer each week for sixty seconds.

Hurley has presented the sports quiz show Know The Score on RTÉ since November 2016.

On 22 January 2023, RTÉ announced that Hurley would be the new presenter of The Sunday Game highlights show, succeeding Des Cahill.

=== Radio ===
Hurley started working for Live 95fm in Limerick after her time in college, where she covered Munster's 2006 Heineken Cup win for the station.

She often appeared on The Colm & Jim-Jim Breakfast Show on RTÉ 2fm where her sports blog was a regular feature.

In early 2009, Hurley took over as the co-presenter of Sunday Sport alongside Con Murphy on RTÉ Radio 1. In doing so she made history as the first ever female presenter in the 40-year history of Sunday Sport at the age of 25. In January 2023, she announced that she would be leaving the show after 14 years to focus on other TV work commitments and spending time with her family.

=== Writing ===
Hurley's first book, Girls Play Too: Inspiring Stories of Irish Sportswomen, was published by Merrion Press in September 2020. An illustrated children's book, Girls Play Too celebrates some of Ireland's top contemporary female athletes.

== Personal life ==
She lives in Dublin with her husband, Shane McMahon. They have two children, Luke and Lily. In August 2011, she and Dublin footballers Eamonn Fennell and Eoghan O'Gara launched the Tomás Mulligan Memorial Cycle, an annual event held in aid of suicide crisis centre Pieta House. Her brother Seán was killed in a car crash at the age of 25 on 30 November 2011.
