= Simon Young (presenter) =

Irish radio and television presenter (1959–2021)

- Born: Thomas Anthony Meade; 1959
- Died: 31 October 2021 (aged 61–62); Dublin, Ireland
- Occupation: Broadcaster
- Employer: Raidió Teilifís Éireann (RTÉ)
- Known for: The Beatbox
- Spouse: Phyl
- Children: Two

Thomas Anthony Meade (1959 – 31 October 2021), known professionally as Simon Young, was an Irish radio and television presenter.

He started in pirate radio and DJ'ing in the 1970's. He presented various TV shows such as The Beatbox and had radio shows on 2FM. He was also known for making contributions to the cult children's television strand, Dempsey's Den, hosted by his radio colleague at that time, Ian Dempsey.

Young resigned from RTÉ in 2002 and held a very private life until 2011. He died ten years later, at the age of 62.

== Career ==
Young presented Simon's Choice or Simon's Saturday Choice on Saturday mornings from 10:00 - 13:00 in the late 1980s. The catchphrase "Hey Simon, What toime is ittt?" originates from this time. Choice was a marketing tool used by the Bank of Ireland, which offered cheap "Fair Cards" for under-26s who opened a "Choice" account at one of their branches.

Young was distinguishable by his moustache which he grew when he was 15 after noticing in the RTÉ Guide that people who worked in RTÉ had moustaches. Tony Fenton affectionately called him "Simes."

He gave British band Bros his approval as they gained minor success with the song, "When Will I Be Famous?".

Young made regular substitute appearances for Ian Dempsey, and these appearances extended as far as the children's television favourite Dempsey's Den on RTÉ Two. He was often seen in convulsions laughing at Dustin the Turkey, which at times rendered him speechless on camera. Young's other radio shows included The Beatbox and the 2FM Weekend Breakfast Show on Saturday and Sunday in the late 1990s. Young also filled the role of Jimmy in the 30-minute Jimmy's Slot for a time on Dempsey's 2fm breakfast show in the 1990s, popularising the phrase "Ger owa dat garden!" After Young left 2fm because of his illness, the station continued broadcasting Ireland's Biggest Jukebox.

He retired from RTÉ in 2002, but returned to the public in July 2011 when he gave an interview to Hot Press.

Young appeared on RTÉ Radio 1's The John Murray Show in August 2011 and talked about his battle with depression and other illnesses. He said during the interview that he had been hospitalised for half of the previous nine years. The Irish Times called the interview with Young the "radio moment of the week ... Easy listening it was not."

== Death ==
Young died on 31 October 2021, aged 62 as confirmed by his family. He died peacefully in his sleep following a long illness. Several sources incorrectly reported his age as 70.

Tributes were paid to him on TV and radio and in print by public figures, such as fellow DJ and presenter Ian Dempsey. Dempsey and Young had been in contact for four decades.

Young is survived by his wife Phyl, son Nathan and daughter Holly.
