= Know The Score =

- Genre: Sport
- Presented by: Jacqui Hurley
- Starring: Ruby Walsh; Shane Byrne
- Country of origin: Ireland
- Original language: English

Production
- Production locations: Studio 1, RTÉ Television Centre, Donnybrook, Dublin 4, Ireland
- Camera setup: Multi-camera
- Running time: 30 minutes

Original release
- Network: RTÉ One
- Release: 6 November 2016

Know The Score is an Irish sports quiz show produced by RTÉ which started airing on 6 November 2016 on RTÉ One. The show was presented by Jacqui Hurley with team captains Ruby Walsh and Shane Byrne.
