= Genevieve Lyons =

Irish actress and writer

- Born: 5 March 1930; Dublin, Ireland
- Died: 18 October 2018 (aged 87–88)

Genevieve Lyons (5 March 1930 in Dublin – 18 October 2018) was an Irish actress, writer, model, radio host and teacher.

== Biography ==
Lyons began her theatrical career as Anya in Anton Chekhov's The Cherry Orchard in the Peacock Theatre directed by Brendan Smith. She also performed in work directed by Hilton Edwards "The Man Who Came to Dinner" with Milo O'Shea, Jimmy O'Dea and Maureen Potter (Lorraine Sheldon) and the Victorian musical "The Drunkard" as Michael MacLiammoirs' distraught wife. She worked for Lord Longford's company in the Gate Theatre, mainly in Restoration comedy, Farquars "The Beau Strategist" and "The Broken World" by French philosopher Gabrielle Marceau who selected her for the lead part.

She was a founder member of the Globe Theatre Dublin with her husband Godfrey Quigley and the actors Michael O'Herlihy, Pamela Duncan and Norman Rodway.

She played the juvenile lead in the first play "The Seventh Step" written by Padraig Fallon. She continued as a leading lady in all The Globe's productions mainly opposite Norman Rodway. She was part of the troupe's attempt to stage an Irish homecoming revival for Richard Harris through a production of The Ginger Man, which closed after three performances due to opposition by the Archbishop because of the play's depiction of sexuality and comments about religion. She acted as leads in the Arts Theatre run by Toto Cogley in "Crime Passionelle" by Albert Camus, as well as others by Gerhart Hauptmann and Tennessee Williams. She also played in the review in the Park Theatre, a topical comedy show.

She worked with the BBC drama company and hosted a programme on Radio Éireann. She appeared in roles on television in The Avengers (Episode: "Please don't feed the animals", 1961) Confession (1970) and the film Stork Talk (1962) as the receptionist.

She appeared as the poster girl for Pond's cold cream.

She later began a career as a writer with novels that include Summer in Dranmore and Demara's Dream.

She taught primary school children for 15 years whilst her daughter was being educated.

== Publications ==
- The Drowning of Alison Alyward (2001) Five Star (ME) ISBN 978-0786229994
- Alice's Awakening (2000) Severn House Publishers Ltd ISBN 978-0727855060
- Danielle's Decision (1999) Chivers ISBN 978-0754038306
- Perdita's Passion (1998) Macmillan Library Reference ISBN 978-0783884592
- The Other Cheek (1998) Little Brown ISBN 978-0751525564
- The Perfect Family (1998) Little Brown ISBN 9780316881432
- Lucy Leightons Journey (1997) Severn House Publishers Ltd ISBN 978-0727851062
- The Lovely American (1996) Little Brown & Company ISBN 978-0751517705
- Poppy Penhaligons Progress (1996) Severn House ISBN 978-0727848949
- Foul Appetite (1995) Sphere ISBN 978-0751506778
- Summer in Dranmore (1994) Sphere ISBN 978-0356207544
- Demara's Dream (1994) Little Brown ISBN 978-0751511680
- The Palucci Vendetta (1992) Warner ISBN 978-0751500226
- Zara (1990) Sphere ISBN 978-0708849835
- A House Divided (1990) Sphere ISBN 978-0708844458
- Dark Rosaleen (1989) Sphere ISBN 978-0708842188
- Green Years (1988) Sphere ISBN 978-0708836774
- The Last Inheritor (1987) Pinnacle ISBN 978-1558170643
- Slievelea (1987) Sphere ISBN 978-0708832684
