= Des Cahill =

Irish sports presenter and commentator

- Born: Desmond Cahill; 10 March 1953 (age 72); Dublin, Ireland
- Education: Colaiste Mhuire, Dublin
- Occupation: Sportscaster
- Employer: RTÉ
- Known for: The Sunday Game, Saturday Sport, The Road to Croker, Play it Again Des, Up for the Match, Morning Ireland, Des's Island Discs, Ireland’s Greatest Sporting Moment

Desmond Cahill (born 12 December 1959) is an Irish sports presenter and commentator with national broadcaster Raidió Teilifís Éireann. From 2009 to 2022, Cahill presented RTÉ television's GAA highlights programme The Sunday Game.

He presents RTÉ's flagship weekend sports radio programme Saturday Sport as well as Up for the Match which previews the All-Ireland Gaelic Football and Hurling final matches. He is also the regular weekday morning sports presenter on Morning Ireland and Today with Sean O'Rourke. Cahill also presents Des's Island Discs on RTÉ Radio 1, which discusses various celebrities' favourite choices of music. Cahill previously presented a daily radio programme called Drivetime Sport on RTÉ Radio 1.

Cahill emerged as a hugely popular figure on the first series of Dancing with the Stars in 2017. He reached week 10 in the 12-week series, partnered by professional dancer, Karen Byrne. Cahill was named "Ireland's Most Influential Journalist on Twitter" in 2015 and 2016. In 2011, he was blacklisted by the Football Association of Ireland.

== Early life ==
Cahill was educated at Coláiste Mhuire in Dublin and began his career as a newspaper reporter. While studying journalism in Rathmines, he spent a couple of years working with The Irish Press group, before moving on to two of Ireland's leading provincial newspapers; The Nationalist (Carlow) and The Kerryman.

== Career ==
In the late 1970s, while still a Journalism student in Rathmines, Cahill began freelancing for The Irish Press group. He did a weekly match report for the Evening Press called The Big Match, featuring a GAA club match in Dublin.

Before finishing in Rathmines he was offered a full-time job with the Carlow Nationalist, by Editor Liam Bergin.

Cahill replaced Joe O'Brien, who was to be a future colleague in the RTE Newsroom. While in Carlow, Cahill played football with the Eire Og club.

In 1981, Cahill moved to The Kerryman newspaper. He was based in Killarney, covering all of South Kerry. He was a member of the Dr Crokes GAA club.

=== 1980s ===
Cahill joined RTÉ in 1984 as a TV news reporter, but quickly began reporting for the Sunday Sport programme on RTÉ Radio 1. By 1987 he had taken over as presenter of the flagship programme from Jimmy Magee.

He has presented programmes from many of the world's top sporting events, including some memorable Irish victories at Olympic Games, FIFA World Cups, UEFA European Championships, Tour de France and the Ryder Cup.

For 20 years he was associated with early morning radio – presenting the sports news on the main news programme, Morning Ireland on RTÉ Radio 1, and in a very different style, with Ian Dempsey on 2FM. It was on Dempsey's show that he began the ABU (Anyone But United) Club and each year he supported the main rivals of football team Manchester United in the Premier League. He designed an ABU shirt, with a crest in Latin, reading "Uppus Cantonis Aris". He engaged with listeners, whose letters and e-mails became a key part of the show.

=== 1990s ===
In the mid-1990s, Cahill began a sports phone-in programme on RTÉ Radio 1 called Sportscall. At one stage it ran three nights a week, but it was on Monday nights, after the weekend games, that fans from all over the country let off steam. He also helped Gay Byrne out with The Gay Byrne Show before Byrne retired in 1998.

On television, he presented Sideline View, RTÉ's first midweek Gaelic Games Championship programme, in the mid-1990s. Apart from special reports from the counties, the programme used the existing panellists from The Sunday Game, and added the likes of Pete Finnerty and Tommy Lyons who themselves went on to become panellists on The Sunday Game.

This was followed by Play it Again Des where Cahill invited some of Ireland's top sporting names to choose their favourite sporting moments from the archives. Guests included Mick O'Dwyer, Johnny Giles, Eamonn Dunphy, Ken Doherty, Moss Keane, Christy O'Connor Jnr, Fergus Slattery, Jimmy Barry-Murphy, Ted Walsh, Liam Brady, Kevin Moran, Mick Doyle, Ger Loughnane, Ollie Campbell and Brian Kerr.

In 1993, Cahill received a Jacob's Award for his radio broadcasts.

=== 2000s ===
In May 2004, while discussing Westmeath's first victory over Offaly in 55 years with Mícheál Ó Muircheartaigh on Morning Ireland, Cahill attracted criticism for his remarks that Westmeath had been under BIFFOs for all that time.

Before the launch of The Road to Croker a weekly Gaelic Games programme, that included a live audience as it visited clubs around the country ahead of the big Championship. When Cahill went to Beijing for the Summer Olympics in 2008, Bertie Ahern took over presenting duties on The Road to Croker. Cahill also presents Up for the Match, the RTÉ entertainment programme that celebrates the All-Ireland final, on the eve of both the Hurling and Gaelic Football finals. Initially he co-presented with Mary Kennedy, but in 2008, Gráinne Seoige became his co-presenter.

In November 2008, he appeared on The Restaurant, where he scored five stars from the critics. In 2009, he became the presenter of the evening highlights edition of The Sunday Game. Also that year he celebrated 25 years in broadcasting, and was reunited with Ian Dempsey when he appeared on The Ian Dempsey Breakfast Show on Today FM.

=== 2010s ===
On 9 June 2010, Cahill co-hosted the opening ceremony of the 2011 Special Olympics World Summer Games Irish heats at Thomond Park with Ian Dempsey.

In July 2011, the Football Association of Ireland complained about remarks made by Cahill while discussing the organisation's AGM on the Saturday Sport radio show. RTÉ bosses "rejected outright" the complaint, and the FAI threatened to sue. Dion Fanning in the Sunday Independent said, "Refusing to talk to Des Cahill is a bit like forbidding your children to read Gentle Ben because playing with bears is dangerous."

Cahill has been featured on Nob Nation, a topical comedy radio show which is written and produced by Oliver Callan. Cahill emerged as a hugely popular figure on the first series of Dancing with the Stars in 2017. He reached week 10 in the 12-week series. He was partnered by Irish professional dancer Karen Byrne.

=== 2020s ===
In October 2022, Cahill announced that he would be stepping down from his role as host of The Sunday Game after 15 seasons of hosting.

== Awards ==
During his career, Cahill has won a Jacob's Award in 1993, an ESB Journalist of the Year award for sport in 2001, and was named PPI Sports Presenter of the Year in 2007.

Year	Nominee / work	Award	Result
1993	Des Cahill	Jacob's Award	Won
2001	Des Cahill	ESB Journalist of the Year	Won
2007	Des Cahill	PPI Sports Presenter of the Year	Won

== Personal life ==
He is married to Caroline, a native of Ballyshannon.
