= The Book of the Resurrection =

- National Museum of Ireland
- Also known as: Leabhar na hAiséirighe
- Date: 1924-1951
- Place of origin: Dublin
- Scribe: Art O'Murnaghan
- Material: Vellum
- Format: Folio
- Condition: Unbound

The Book of the Resurrection (Leabhar na hAiséirighe) is a 20th-century illuminated manuscript created by the artist Art O'Murnaghan, commissioned by the Irish Free State government in 1924.

== History ==
The Book of Resurrection, also known by its Irish name, Leabhar na hAiséirighe, was commissioned by Irish Republican Memorial Committee (IRMC) in 1924. The manuscript was to commemorate the leaders of the 1916 Easter Rising, and others who died during the Irish War of Independence and "a national memorial to the memory of the heroes who [had] given their lives for the attainment of the absolute independence of Ireland since Easter Week 1916." The impetus for the commission was possibly the Ireland's Memorial Records 1914-1918, illustrated by Harry Clarke, which commemorated the Irish who died in World War I.

O'Murnaghan's work came to the attention of the IRMC's secretary, Ella Young, in 1922 leading her to inviting O'Murnaghan to submit work for the competition to win the commission. It was his Éire page, chosen as a winner by artist Mia Cranwill, which served as the prototype for the rest of the resulting manuscript.

Between 1924 and 1951, the book was created in 3 phases, with initial funding from Joseph McGarrity, a Clann na nGael activist in the United States. Subsequent phases were paid for through public subscription. The low pay resulted in O'Murnaghan being forced to abandon work on the manuscript for months or years at a time. To raise more funds, he would print and sign copies of the completed pages to sell.

The manuscript consists of 26 unbound vellum sheets and was intended to be a combination of illuminated pages and lists of the dead. Also included were writings and sayings of Irish Nationalist leaders, with the illuminations depicting regions and events from recent and ancient Irish history and mythology. One example is the illumination entitled "The Men of the Harbours", which commemorated Eskine Childers and 1914 arrival of the Asgard at Howth. Others commemorated are Kevin Barry, Cathal Brugha, Michael Collins, Terence MacSwiney, Kevin O'Higgins, Patrick Pearse, Joseph Plunkett, and Roger Casement.

== Artistic style ==
O'Murnaghan drew heavily on ancient Irish manuscripts both stylistically and methodically. He executed the manuscript using traditional materials and even grinding and mixing his own pigments and paints. Stylistically it is viewed as part of the Irish art renaissance of the early 20th century, which is often referred to as "Neo-Celtic". O'Murnaghan draws on ancient art works, but also modern movements such as Art Nouveau, and his work is deemed to have been highly influential in this style during the 20th century. The style was widely used by the Irish government, and has been viewed as a key element in that early Irish State propaganda.

== Exhibition ==
The manuscript is held by the National Museum of Ireland and it and copies have been exhibited in Ireland and internationally.

- McMullen Museum, Boston College in the Making it Irish exhibition
- National Museum of Ireland, Collins Barracks in the Proclaiming a Republic exhibition
- A facsimile manuscript was exhibited by the Dublin Central Library in 2006
