= Greg Allen (broadcaster) =

Irish journalist and sports broadcaster

- Education: Dublin Institute of Technology
- Occupations: Journalist, sports commentator
- Years active: 1984–present
- Employer: RTÉ
- Known for: Athletics and golf commentary

Greg Allen is an Irish journalist and sports broadcaster who has worked for RTÉ since 1984. He is known as one of RTÉ's principal athletics and golf commentators, and has been described by The 42 as the voice of Irish athletics.

== Early life and education ==
Allen is the youngest of four brothers. He played tennis to national junior level, an interest that later drew him towards athletics, and he joined a Dublin athletics club as a runner in 1983. He studied journalism at the Dublin Institute of Technology between 1980 and 1982 and worked freelance for newspapers and magazines before joining the RTÉ Radio sports department in 1984.

== Career ==
=== Early years ===
After joining RTÉ as a presenter and reporter, Allen initially covered Gaelic games, rugby and soccer as a young reporter. By 1987 he had begun reporting on athletics, and he attended the 1988 Summer Olympics in Seoul as an athletics reporter and interviewer, working as an apprentice to the veteran RTÉ commentator Jimmy Magee.

=== Athletics ===
Allen moved into race commentary at the 1992 Summer Olympics in Barcelona, taking charge of the athletics coverage while Magee was occupied with the boxing tournament in which Wayne McCullough and Michael Carruth won medals for Ireland. He has since covered every World Athletics Championships since 1993 and every European Athletics Championships since 1990. Writing in 2025 as he prepared to cover his tenth World Championships, in Tokyo, The 42 noted that he had attended the same number of Summer Olympic Games.

His work coincided with the rise of Irish distance runners Sonia O'Sullivan and Catherina McKiernan in the 1990s, and he provided the radio commentary as O'Sullivan won 5000 metres silver at the 2000 Summer Olympics. Allen began his career in radio and later commentated for television as well.

=== Golf ===
Allen began covering golf for RTÉ in 1991. He has since commentated on numerous Ryder Cups, Open Championships, Masters Tournaments and US Opens, as well as other tournaments in Ireland and abroad.

== Commentary style ==
Allen's commentary is characterised by an unscripted and emotive delivery, an approach he has attributed to his naturally excitable temperament. His call of the Irish team's victory in the mixed 4 × 400 metres relay at the 2024 European Athletics Championships in Rome, in which he repeatedly urged anchor runner Sharlene Mawdsley to "hold your nerve", was widely praised and cited by RTÉ as an example of the impact of live sports commentary.
