= Art O'Murnaghan =

Irish painter

- Born: Arthur Walter O'Murnaghan; 1872; Southampton, England
- Died: 8 July 1954 (aged 81–82); Dublin, Ireland
- Known for: artist, designer

Art O'Murnaghan (1872 – 8 July 1954) was an Irish artist, designer, actor, and polymath.

== Early life and education ==
Art O'Murnaghan was born Arthur Walter Murnaghan in 1872 in Southampton, England. His parents were Arthur and Rachel O'Murnaghan. His father was an official of the Ordnance Survey in Southampton, whose family were originally from Loughbrickland, County Down. His mother was Welsh. O'Murnaghan was educated at Southampton grammar school and went on to win a scholarship to Cambridge but he was unable to take up the scholarship, instead choosing to become an apprentice dispensing chemist for 4 years. He then went on to work at the Carnegie Public Library in Southampton, qualifying as a librarian.

== Career ==
Despite having no formal artistic training, O'Murnaghan moved to London to design floral wallpapers, with Liberty selling some of his designs. In 1898, he moved to Dublin and, embracing his Irish roots, changed his name to Art O'Murnaghan. Interested in learning more about his Irish heritage, O'Murnaghan joined the Gaelic League, through which he became close friends with Douglas Hyde and Arthur Griffith. From 1905 to 1917, he designed stencilled badges for the League's Oireachtas. From 1902 he drew and wrote for the United Irishman. After a fall in demand for floral wallpapers, O'Murnaghan found a job as a cinema piano and organ accompanist in cinemas including the Volta Cinema. He then opened a pharmacy business in Rathgar, Dublin.

Around 1917, O'Murnaghan designed five Christmas cards for Sinn Féin, which are now held in the National Museum of Ireland. Having taught himself calligraphy, he completed his first illumination of The vision of Brigid, which took him 3 years to finish. His printed ornamentations appeared in the first issue of the Dublin Magazine in September 1923, illustrating a series by Ella Young entitled "The adventures of Gubbaun Saor and his son". By this time, he had closed his pharmacy business. O'Murnaghan designed the Celtic motif for a new Donegal hand-tufted carpet for the Dáil, Leinster House. He provided decorative borders for Hilton Edwards's essay 'The historical pageant' in Mac Liammóir's The ford of the hurdles: a masque of Dublin published for Dublin civic week. He exhibited paintings with the Royal Hibernian Academy in 1929. He designed the cover of the 1932 Saorstat Eireann, the Irish Free State official handbook, which was edited by Bulmer Hobson.

=== The Book of the Resurrection ===
In 1922 he was commissioned to illuminate The Book of the Resurrection (Leabhar na hAiséirighe) by the Irish Free State government, with funds raised for this commission through the sale of the Éire page, the winning design which O'Murnaghan had submitted to the selection committee. The commission was interrupted a number of times, but it became O'Murnaghan's mission to complete it and it is seen to be his masterpiece. He started the work on Holy Saturday, 19 April 1924, completing the first nine and half folios by spring 1927 receiving a weekly fee of 30 shillings. O'Murnaghan ground and mixed his own paints, in the tradition of medieval artists, basing his designs on earlier illuminated manuscripts. His work also demonstrates influence from Asian illustrations and went on to strongly influence 20th century "Celtic" art. By 1951, 26 calf-vellum sheets were completely decorated, and in 1954 O'Murnaghan had planned for the remaining folios. However, he died before completing the book, and it remained unbound, and is now in the collections of the National Museum of Ireland.

=== Theatre work ===
He worked as a set designer for Daisy Bannard Cogley in his Little Theatre on Harcourt Street, going on to become an actor, designer, composer and stage manager for the Gate Theatre. He appeared in at least 17 productions, and contributed scores to others. He acted as stage manager for 13 plays, and assistant art director of 7. He appeared in the films Odd man out and Another share. In 1936 he toured Egypt with the Gate Theatre company, retiring from the theatre the same year.

== Later life and death ==
O'Murnaghan was interested in archaeology, conducting some excavations at Newgrange, and compared the site with the Egyptian pyramids. He was also interested in theosophy and herbalism, visiting Tibet to study the Buddhist way of life. From 1936, he taught calligraphy in the National College of Art, and from 1939 taught the new class "Oriental design in Celtic ornament" which was later retired during the Emergency. O'Murnaghan applied to the Department of Education for a pension, but was refused on the basis that he was not a civil servant.

He married Madame K. Murnaghan, with whom he had 2 daughters and 4 sons. She was a niece of Alexander Williams and was a singer and musician. He died on 8 July 1954 in a Dublin hospital, and is buried in Mount Jerome cemetery. The National Gallery of Ireland holds a portrait of O'Murnaghan by Estella Solomons. He had written a memoir called Irons in the fire, which was destroyed following his death. The Ulster Museum holds some of his pastels and watercolours.
