= Liam Ó Murchú =

Irish television broadcaster (1929–2015)

- Born: 12 February 1929; Cork, Ireland
- Died: 28 June 2015 (aged 86); Glenageary, Dublin, Ireland
- Education: Literature at University College Cork
- Occupations: Writer and broadcaster

Liam Ó Murchú (10 February 1929 – 28 June 2015) was an Irish television broadcaster, who worked with the national station Radio Telefís Éireann (RTÉ).

Liam Ó Murchú was born in Blarney Street, Cork in 1929. He was educated in the nearby Christian Brothers school and won a scholarship to secondary school in the North Mon. He subsequently attended University College Cork where he studied literature. Ó Murchú left UCC after a year to become a clerical officer. He later turned to writing, and his works were published in the United States, Britain and at home. Ó Murchú was later appointed law adviser to the Minister for Health, Seán MacEntee and later Charles Haughey. At the February 1982 general election he stood for election to Dáil Éireann as a Fianna Fáil candidate in the Cork North-Central constituency, but polled considerably less than expected with about 4.5% of the vote.

He joined RTÉ in 1964 in the role of Editor of Irish language programmes and later went on to become Assistant Controller of Programmes and Assistant to the Director General. He also turned his hand to broadcasting, presenting such shows as Trom agus Éadrom, for which he won a Jacob's Award in 1976, and Up for the Final. He was renowned for using the Irish language phrase "Bualadh Bos" on this show when asking the audience to clap. He also worked in conjunction with the School of Celtic Studies at Dublin Institute for Advanced studies from 1975 to 1978.

Ó Murchú left RTÉ in 1988 to set up his own production company, however, he returned to the small screen on a number of occasions presenting such programmes as Lifelines. In 2002 he received an honorary degree from University College Cork. He wrote an article every month for the weekly magazine Ireland's Own. He died on 28 June 2015 at the age of 86.
