= The Beatbox =

Irish music programme

The Beatbox was an Irish music programme, broadcast as a simulcast across both television (RTÉ Two) and radio (RTÉ 2fm) between the hours of 11.30 and 1.30 on Sunday mornings / afternoons. It ran from the late 1980s until 1995, and had a number of different presenters through the years, including Barry Lang, Simon Young, Peter Collins and Ian Dempsey. It was a forerunner of the similar 2TV, hosted by Dave Fanning.
