= John Murray (Irish broadcaster) =

Irish journalist and broadcaster (born 1964)

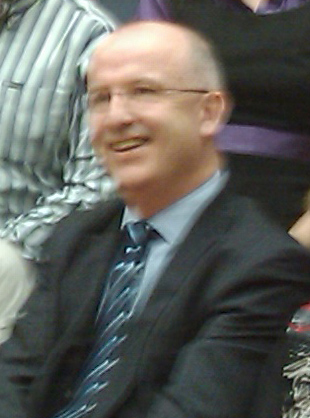
- John Murray in 2009
- Born: 1964 (age 61–62); Tallaght, Dublin, Ireland
- Education: Synge Street CBS, School of Journalism, Rathmines
- Occupations: Journalist, broadcaster
- Notable credit(s): Morning Ireland; The Business; The John Murray Show

John Murray is an Irish journalist and broadcaster. Currently heard on Weekend Sport, he presented The John Murray Show on RTÉ Radio 1, "focus[ing] on lifestyle and entertainment items", filling the slot from 09:00 to 10:00 previously occupied by Ryan Tubridy, who moved to RTÉ 2fm. Murray was one of the presenters of Morning Ireland, Ireland's most popular radio show, before going on to host his own weekly programme, The Business.

== Career ==
Murray trained at the School of Journalism in Rathmines in Dublin. In 1983, his first job was as a junior reporter with the Tallaght Echo. After six months, he moved to The Cork Examiner and worked there for six years. He was Head of News in a new independent radio station, Cork's 96FM, from 1990 until 1992. Later that year, he became a general reporter for RTÉ.

Murray worked in RTÉ for three years. In his time there, he worked on Morning Ireland. In 1995, he was asked by Mary Harney, then leader of the Progressive Democrats, to be her media adviser. After two years he became Deputy Government Press Secretary and Head of the Government Information Services. He worked as deputy press secretary until 2000.

Murray worked in China for two years when his wife, Irish Times journalist Miriam Donohoe, was based in the country. In 2003, he moved back to RTÉ. He was appointed as a business reporter on Morning Ireland.

Murray co-presented Morning Ireland until 2010. From 2004, he also hosted his own hour-long radio business programme, The Business, which was broadcast each Saturday morning on RTÉ Radio 1. In 2008, he published his book Now That's What I Call Jargon. From September 2010, he began presenting The John Murray Show on RTÉ Radio 1, replacing The Tubridy Show. One of his first guests on the programme was Bertie Ahern. The Business is currently presented by George Lee.

In 2007, he won the award for Business Broadcast in the first ever UCD Smurfit School Business Journalist Awards.

A 2011 satirical sketch on The John Murray Show, in which the Tyrone GAA manager Mickey Harte was the main subject, resulted in significant controversy and an ongoing (as of August 2018) boycott of RTE GAA media events by Harte and members of the Tyrone GAA senior team, owing to the sketch's insensitive nature which appeared to allude to Harte's recently murdered daughter.

It was announced on 26 June 2015 that RTÉ would axe The John Murray Show with the last episode due to broadcast on 3 July. He was replaced by Ryan Tubridy.

Murray was among the presenters of Weekend Sport until the early 2020's. In 2025 he presented a short series for Radio 1, "The Pitch", focussing on GAA clubs.

== Personal life ==
John Murray was born to parents Vivian Murray, a prominent Irish businessman, and his wife, Nancy (née Clear). He has two adult children, Stephen and Catherine.

Murray has suffered from depression, which resulted in him taking a six-month break from his radio show in 2013.

Preceded by Ryan Tubridy	RTÉ Radio 1 mid-morning host 2010–2015	Succeeded by Ryan Tubridy
