= Godfrey Quigley =

Irish actor (1923–1994)

- Quigley in Daleks' Invasion Earth 2150 A.D. (1966)
- Born: Godfrey John Quigley; 4 May 1923; Jerusalem, Palestine
- Died: 7 September 1994 (aged 71); Dublin, Ireland
- Education: Abbey School of Acting
- Occupations: Film, television and stage actor
- Years active: 1949–1989
- Organization: Globe Theatre Company founder
- Spouse: Genevieve Lyons (1954—??) (divorced)

Godfrey Quigley (4 May 1923 – 7 September 1994) was an Irish film, television and stage actor. He appeared in Stanley Kubrick's films A Clockwork Orange and Barry Lyndon.

== Biography ==
Quigley was born in Jerusalem, Mandatory Palestine, where his father was serving as an officer in the British Army. The family returned to Ireland in the 1930s and, following military service in the Second World War, Quigley trained as an actor at the Abbey School of Acting.

In 1949, Quigley made his first film appearance, in Saints and Sinners. He appeared in two Stanley Kubrick films: first as the prison chaplain in A Clockwork Orange (1971), and then as Captain Grogan in Barry Lyndon (1975). In British television, he played a has-been gangster in the serial Big Breadwinner Hog (1969). His theatre roles include the Irishman in Tom Murphy's The Gigli Concert, for which he won the Harvey's Best Actor Award in 1984.

In the 1950s, Quigley co-founded the Globe Theatre Company, whose members included his wife, Genevieve Lyons. The company was disestablished in 1960. During the same period, he produced the radio soap opera The Kennedys of Castleross.

In 1983 Quigley appeared in the film Educating Rita.

== Death ==
Quigley died in Dublin of Alzheimer's disease, aged 71.

== Filmography ==
Year	Title	Role	Notes
1949	Saints and Sinners	Colin	Uncredited
1957	The Rising of the Moon	Christy Donigan	
1958	Rooney	Tom Reilly	
1959	Broth of a Boy	Desmond Phillips	
1960	The Siege of Sidney Street	Blakey	
1962	Dead Man's Evidence	Supt. O'Brien	
1964	Nothing But the Best	Coates	
1964	The Counterfeit Constable	Inspector Savory	
1966	Daleks' Invasion Earth 2150 A.D.	Dortmun	
1969	Guns in the Heather	Meister	
1969	The Reckoning	Dr. Carolan	
1971	Get Carter	Eddie Appleyard	
1971	A Clockwork Orange	Prison Chaplain	
1973	Conflict	Father Walter	
1975	Barry Lyndon	Captain Grogan	
1977	The Man in the Iron Mask	Baisemeaux	
1983	Educating Rita	Rita's father	
1989	All Dogs Go to Heaven	Terrier	Voice (final film role)
