= The Road to Croker =

- RTÉ advertisement for the episode hosted by Bertie Ahern in August 2008
- Genre: Sports magazine
- Presented by: Des Cahill
- Country of origin: Ireland
- Original languages: English; Irish

Production
- Running time: 30 minutes

Original release
- Network: RTÉ Two
- Release: April 2007 – September 2009

Related
- The Committee Room

The Road to Croker is a magazine style sports television programme broadcast on RTÉ Two during the Gaelic games season. The programme featured input from clubs, players and managers or Banisteoirí. Retired Gaelic Athletic Association figures, such as Michael "Babs" Keating, also made contributions. The "Croker" in the title refers to the stadium Croke Park where the season draws to a close in September with the finals in Gaelic football and hurling. The programme was nominated at the Irish Film and Television Awards (IFTAs).

The Road to Croker was produced by Loose Horse. Episodes were recorded in GAA clubs around Ireland, including Clarinbridge GAA Club in County Galway. That episode was recorded on the day before it was broadcast. Episodes were originally broadcast on RTÉ Two on Thursday evenings but the programme was moved to a new slot on Friday evenings for the 2009 season. In September 2009 the programme was axed and disbanded. Two years later it was replaced by The Committee Room (later Championship Matters).

== Presenters ==
The Road to Croker was originally presented by Des Cahill. Former Taoiseach Bertie Ahern presented one episode during August 2008 when Cahill was attending RTÉ Radio's coverage of the 2008 Summer Olympics in Beijing. Cahill commented at the time: "With Bertie's proven love and knowledge of GAA, I've no doubt that I'm leaving the show in safe hands". Miriam Lord, writing in The Irish Times after the episode, said Ahern "may have looked and sounded a bit wooden" but that he "didn't put a foot wrong". Two other episodes were presented by Brian Gleeson at this time also. Patrick Kielty took over as host when Cahill moved to present the television highlights package The Sunday Game to replace his predecessor Pat Spillane; Kielty used the show to speak about how GAA had influenced his early stand-up comedy.
