= Daisy Bannard Cogley =

French-born Irish director and theatre designer (1884/1885–1965)

- Detail of Cogley from a Harry Kernoff sketch
- Born: Jeanne Marie Desirée Bannard; 5 May 1884; Paris, France
- Died: 8 September 1965; Dublin, Ireland
- Known for: stage acting, directing, producing, and costume and theatre design
- Spouse: Frederick Joseph Cogley (m. 1909; died 1937)

Daisy "Toto" Bannard Cogley (born Jeanne Marie Desirée Bannard; 5 May 1884 – 8 September 1965) was a French-born Irish theatre actress, director, producer and designer. A socialist, she was active in the Irish War of Independence from 1917, and was interned during the Irish Civil War. She was an active figure on Dublin's theatrical scene for decades, as well as in Wexford and for a time London, launching multiple theatre and cabaret studios, and she was a co-founder of one of Dublin's main theatres, the Gate, of which she remained a director from 1928 to her death.

== Life ==
=== Early life ===
Daisy Bannard Cogley was born Jeanne Marie (rendered in English as Johanna Mary) Desirée Bannard in Paris, France, on 5 May 1884. Her father, Thomas Bannard, was French and worked as a coachman. Her mother, Mary Furlong, was from County Wexford.

Bannard studied at the Sorbonne, studying acting and vocals at the Comédie-Française in Paris, and also at the Conservatoire de Paris in the very early 20th century. She then secured a job with the Theatre Antoine, and toured in provincial France. Some sources state that she was performing in Chile when she met Irish journalist Fred J. Cogley in Santiago while other sources state that she met Fred while on holiday in his native Wexford, and her mother's disapproval of their relationship led to them organising a reunion in Santiago. They married there in 1909 and their first child, called in English Mitchel, was born there in 1910.

Bannard Cogley worked to establish the Wexford Opera Society 3–4 years before World War I, and the family moved to Ireland in 1914 or at least by 1917. Bannard Cogley variously referred to herself as Nóinín (Irish for Daisy) as well as the stage name Helen Carter when she acted in Edward Martyn's Irish Theatre Company on Hardwicke Street.

=== Early theatrical career and political activity ===
On arrival in Ireland, Toto or Madame Bannard, as she was generally known, pursued theatrical work, and Fred secured a job at the Independent newspaper, while some sources state that the Cogleys became involved in the campaign for Irish independence immediately. Bannard Cogley took part in a 1914 tableau by the Irish Women's Franchise League entitled the Daffodil Fete, that was staged at Molesworth Hall in Dublin on 25 April, and in which she played the part of Sappho. She worked with the Dublin Drama League, and the Hardwicke Street Theatre Company, with whom she performed as Madame Ranevesky to good reviews, in the first Irish staging of Chekov's The Cherry Orchard as directed by John MacDonagh in 1919. During this period she acted in at least three Irish productions, with Joseph Holloway describing her as an actor "with temperament and abandon, not afraid to let herself go". One source states that both of the Cogleys were at one point imprisoned simultaneously by the British authorities, with Bannard Cogley arranging plays even in jail, and sworn witnessed records mention involvement with Republican activities from 1917 onwards, storing arms and ammunition, passing messages and providing shelter to colleagues on the run. In later periods of the War of Independence, and into the Civil War period, Bannard Cogley was involved in the production of a Republican bulletin.

Bannard Cogley played with the Queen's Theatre in Dublin, and the Wexford Opera Society. She also founded the Little Theatre on Harcourt Street in Dublin in the later 1910s. This theatre hosted performances from a number of Irish playwrights and sets designed by artists including Art O'Murnaghan. She directed a production of Dorothy Macardle's Asthara in 1918, the first professional production of a play by Macardle.

Both Bannard Cogley and her husband were against the Irish Treaty and were interned at the same time during the Irish Civil War in Mountjoy and Kilmainham. Detained at the Sinn Fein offices on Suffolk Street in November 1922, Bannard Cogley's worries for her children while she was held were recorded by Rosamund Jacob. She was released in the early summer of 1923 upon agreeing to conditions which included curtailing her political activities. In 1923, Cogley attended the international Red Cross Conference in Geneva as one of two members of the Irish Republican delegation, attempting to raise the treatment of Republican prisoners. With an objection by a UK delegate, stating that the Irish Red Cross had enough powers to deal with the question locally, the question was not taken up. Bannard Cogley also performed in benefits to raise funds for St. Ultan's Children's Hospital and the Irish Republican Prisoners' Defense Funds. Despite her release agreement of 1923, she was present to greet Eamon de Valera in a private home when he was released in July 1924.

=== The Radical Club and Harry Kernoff ===
Bannard Cogley was associated with the short-lived Radical Club, becoming close friends with artist Harry Kernoff. Kernoff introduced her to wider communist and socialist circles in Ireland, and produced several portraits of her including a study in 1930. Bannard Cogley began her cabaret evenings as part of the Cabaret Committee of the Radical Club.

Between 1928 and 1929, Bannard Cogley was involved as stage manager and in costuming for a number of productions in the Peacock Theatre.

=== Cabaret ===
Bannard Cogley's cabarets were initially exclusively part of the events of the Radical Club but later, after some members became disgruntled that the cabaret was dominating the Club's meetings and events, Bannard Cogley started to hold her cabarets independently. They were held throughout the late 1920s and early 1930s in the basement of 41 Harcourt Street and continued to thrive after the Radical Club became defunct. As a private members' club, performances were not subject to the same level of censorship or scrutiny as public performances would have been. As the success of the cabarets continued, the venue was moved to 7 South William Street. Elaine Sisson stresses that Bannard Cogley's cabaret would not have been comparable to the more hedonistic scene found in the Kit-Kat Club or the Tingel Tangel, but that for the cultural landscape of the post-Civil War Irish Free State, it was a more permissive and experimental expressive performance space. Among others who frequently attended her cabaret club were Blanaid Salkeld, Con Leventhal and Samuel Beckett. She was a prominent member of the Dublin Theatre Group.

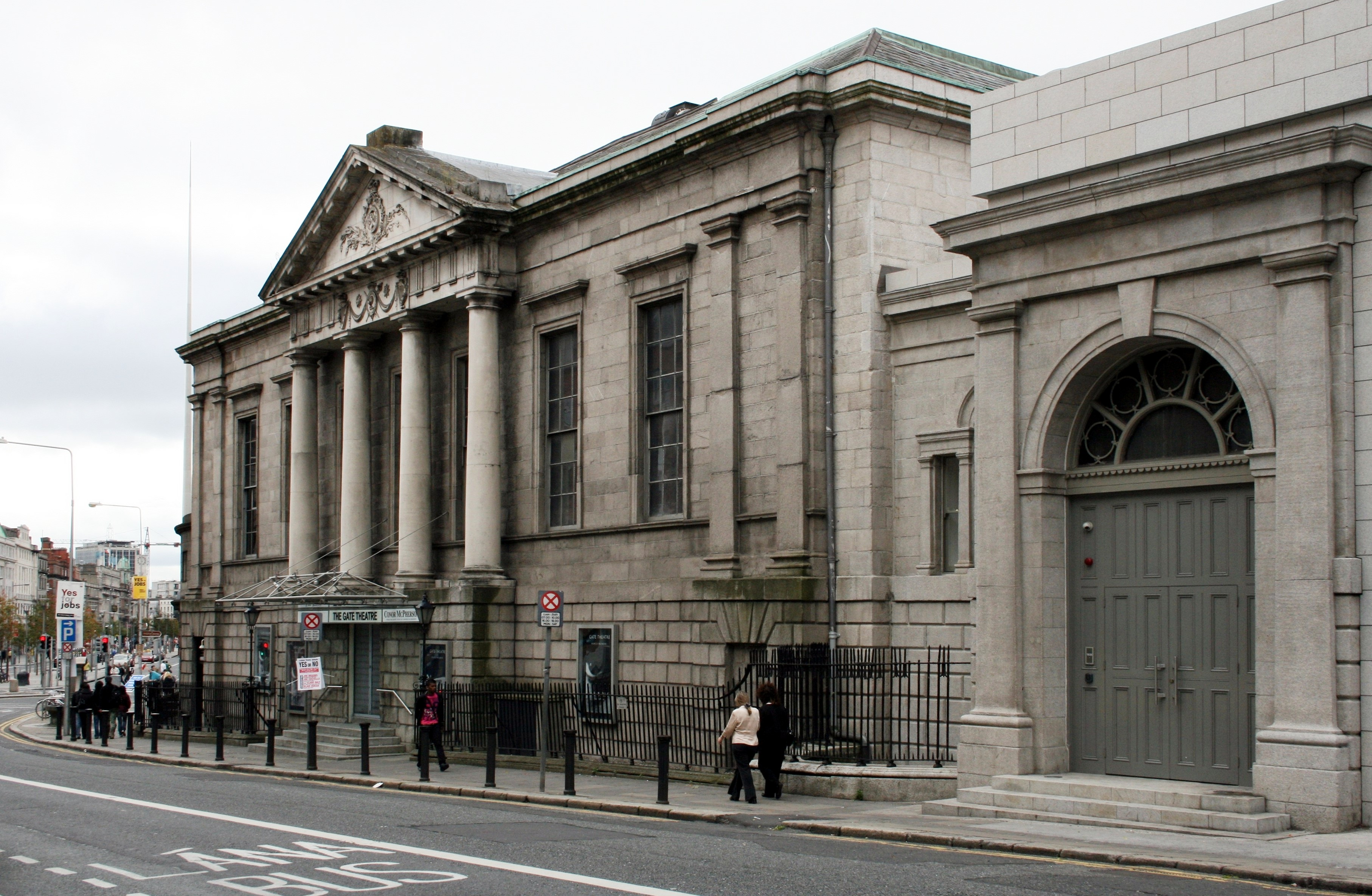
She co-founded Dublin's Gate Theatre

=== The Gate ===
Bannard Cogley was one of the four founders of the Gate Theatre Studio, later simply the Gate Theatre, alongside Hilton Edwards, Michéal Mac Liammóir, and Gearóid Ó Lochlainn in 1928. She and Ó Lochlainn had been discussing finding a more permanent theatre space when they met Edwards and Mac Liammóir (a long-term friend of hers), along with some mutual friends, in Bannard Cogley's club at 7 Harcourt Street, in spring 1928. After further meetings, the quartet rented the Peacock stage of the Abbey Theatre and launched the Gate Theatre Studio there on 14 October 1928. Bannard Cogley's cabaret brought the Gate its initial membership list of 400 people. She also acted in the inaugural show of the Gate, Peer Gynt by Ibsen, in October 1928, and many other early plays of the new theatre, as well as participating in costume making. Her Harcourt Street club also hosted most early Gate rehearsals, including that of Faust when the theatre moved to its long-term home on Cavendish Row.

Bannard Cogley also mounted productions at her Studio Theatre Club, on Upper Mount Street, such as Teresa Deevy's Wife to James Whelan in 1956. Notably, this theatre was also referred to as Madame Cogley's Studio Theatre and occasionally operated from the Gate Theatre throughout the 1940s. She was less active in the operations of the Gate in later years, though she remained one of three directors-for-life of the theatre's holding company, joined later by the main source of finance for the theatre over many decades, Lord Longford, and Louis Jamet. She was involved in a critical meeting in 1961, when the theatre was in severe financial danger - the meeting resolved long-standing splits within the Gate's structures, committed to future operations, and co-opted Desmond Guinness as a new director.

=== London ===
Bannard Cogley's cabaret closed after she moved to London in the 1930s, frustrated with the increasingly conservative culture under de Valera, opening the Green Curtain Theatre Club there. The Green Curtain, a small scale theatre in Hampstead which ran a Sunday play weekly, and where she worked with George Roberts on many productions, put on many Irish plays. She returned to Dublin in the early 1940s due to World War II, moving back permanently after her husband's death in 1949. She opened a new cabaret theatre in Harcourt Street. She then opened the Studio Theatre, dedicated to the production of "unusual plays", in a basement at 43 Upper Mount Street, and ran it until failing eyesight curtailed her activities. Collaborators there included Anna Manahan, Louis Lentin and Genevieve Lyons.

=== Family and later life ===
Bannard Cogley had two sons with her husband, Mitchel Victor (1910–1991) and Fergus Thomas. Mitchel was a sports journalist, while Fergus was an actor and participated in some of his mother's theatrical activities, including helping open the post-World War II Studio Theatre Club and acting in a play about a war between Ireland and a Northern Ireland from which the UK had withdrawn.

Bannard Cogley died at Mercer's Hospital, Dublin, 8 September 1965. In her obituary in the Irish Press and in some other references, her name was rendered as Johanna Mary Cogley. Her grandson was RTÉ broadcaster, Fred Cogley, Mitchel's son, and his son in turn was also a reporter, Niall. Although she had stated in 1955 that she was writing "my reminiscences of Ireland and the Irish theatre and all my friends", unlike many of her contemporaries Bannard Cogley did not actually publish a memoir or a collection of personal papers.
