= Liam Nolan (writer) =

Liam Nolan is an internationally published author whose books include Small Man of Nanataki, The Pain and the Glory, Islanders, The Forgotten Famine, The Savage Square and Once in August Long Ago. He is the current Eastern Europe Reporter based in Warsaw, Poland for RTÉ News since December 2022. He is a former radio and television (BBC, ITV and RTÉ) anchorman in current affairs and sport, and has been at various times reporter, columnist, international editor, features editor, and sports editor.
