= Monday Night Soccer =

- MNS Logo
- Presented by: Peter Collins main presenter Tony O'Donoghue part-time presenter
- Opening theme: "Is It Any Wonder?" by Keane
- Country of origin: Ireland

Production
- Running time: 60 minutes

Original release
- Network: RTÉ Two
- Release: 10 March 2008 – 2013

Monday Night Soccer is a former football television programme shown on RTÉ Two each Monday evening during the football season. Presented by Peter Collins, he was usually joined by two guests, like manager Damien Richardson and former Millwall striker Richard Sadlier. Broadcast weekly on Monday evenings live from RTÉ studio 5, every League of Ireland Premier Division game was shown. In July and August editions of the show, it showed UEFA Champions League and Europa League matches, involving participating League of Ireland clubs.

TV3 owned the rights to a long-running weekly League of Ireland highlights programme until 2007. In 2008, a deal was struck between RTÉ and the Football Association of Ireland (FAI), due to end in 2013. As a part of that deal, RTÉ broadcast this show weekly and showed some matches live on its Airtricty League Live programme. The first edition was broadcast on Monday 10 March 2008, presented by Tony O'Donoghue. Broadcast at the earlier time of 7 pm (previously 8 pm), as opposed to the 11:30 pm Monday night slot occupied by its TV3 predecessor, eircom League Weekly (which was repeated Tuesdays at 5 pm), Con Murphy presented most of the shows; however, when covered the Beijing Olympics in August 2008, Tony O'Donoghue filled in and did so when Con was unavailable. Eamonn Donohoe and Stephen Alkin reported and it was shown on the RTÉ website. The Irish Times reported in November 2008 that the programme's poor viewing figures made a move to a different time slot in 2009 a possibility; however, this was not the case and the show returned to its regular time slot.

Roddy Collins left the sofa after he was appointed manager of Maltese club Floriana in June 2009. He returned in a number of months after being sacked as manager of Floriana.

After the show's cancellation, it was replaced by Soccer Republic which airs at a later time on Monday nights than its predecessor and also shows highlights of each of the previous weekend's Premier Division matches.
