= Con Murphy (presenter) =

Irish radio and television presenter

- Born: Conleth Murphy; 30 January 1966 (age 60)
- Occupation: Broadcaster
- Known for: Sports and good humoured presentation style.

Conleth 'Con' Murphy (born 30 January 1966) is an Irish freelance radio and television presenter, working mainly on sports programming. Until recently he presented Monday Night Soccer on RTÉ Two, the League of Ireland highlights show which also includes highlights of Republic of Ireland soccer matches. He also co-presented Crimecall with Anne Cassin. On radio, he co-presented Sunday Sport on RTÉ Radio 1, with Jacqui Hurley.

He left RTÉ in 2012.

== Career ==
Murphy worked as one of the main sports presenters with RTÉ from 1992 until 2012. In that time he anchored RTÉ Radio's coverage of the Summer Olympics Atlanta 1996, Sydney 2000, Athens 2004 Beijing 2008, and London 2012.

He has presented football, golf, rugby, hockey, basketball, athletics, and horse racing on RTÉ Television.

He presented international football on RTÉ radio for 17 years until 2012 and reported from the 2002 FIFA World Cup in Japan and South Korea, plus he was part of RTÉ Radio's award-winning commentary team from the 2006 Ryder Cup at the K Club.

He presented the nightly highlights programme on RTÉ Sport's coverage of the 2010 FIFA World Cup.
