= Richard Sadlier =

Irish footballer

Personal information
- Full name: Richard Sadlier
- Date of birth: 14 January 1979 (age 47)
- Place of birth: Dublin, Ireland
- Position: Striker

Youth career
- Leicester Celtic
- Belvedere

Senior career*
Years	Team	Apps	(Gls)
1996–2004	Millwall	47	(53)

International career
- Republic of Ireland U18
- Republic of Ireland U20
2002	Republic of Ireland	1	(0)
- * Club domestic league appearances and goals

Richard Sadlier (born 14 January 1979) is an Irish former professional footballer and former CEO of St Patrick's Athletic. Since retirement from the professional game he has worked as a pundit with RTÉ Sport.. Sadlier scored in a UEFA European U-14 quarter final.

== Club career ==
Sadlier began his career at youth level with Broadford Rovers before joining Leicester Celtic and Belvedere before joining Millwall F.C.

Sadlier played during the 2000–01 Second Division Champions but was sidelined for the 2004 FA Cup Final in his final season. A striker, Sadlier scored 34 goals in 103 starts for Millwall. In an interview with the BBC, Mark McGhee named Sadlier as potentially the best young centre forward he had ever worked with in his managerial career. In 2003, Sadlier retired from the professional game due to a hip injury at the age of 24.

== International career ==
Sadlier represented his country at the 1997 UEFA European Under-18 Championship, and scored Ireland's goal against Spain in the third-place playoff.

Sadlier's only cap at senior level came against Russia in a friendly at Lansdowne Road on 13 February 2002. He was highly favoured to make Mick McCarthy's final 23-man Republic of Ireland squad for the 2002 FIFA World Cup, but had to withdraw with a hip injury which ultimately ended his football career prematurely.

== Board appointment ==
In 2007, Sadlier was appointed to the board of St Patrick's Athletic He resigned from his post at St Patrick's at the end of the 2009 season.

== Media career ==
In 2006, Sadlier was approached to write a column for the Sunday Independent after previously doing some punditry work with Setanta Sports, he also contributes regularly to Newstalk.

In 2008, Sadlier joined RTÉ's panel of pundits for its League of Ireland coverage, dominated by Monday Night Soccer. He later contributed to RTÉ Sport's coverage of the 2010 FIFA World Cup. He became a panellist on RTÉ Two's Premier Soccer Saturday, and covered the 2010–11 Premier League. In 2012, Sadlier was a studio analyst as part of RTÉ Sport's coverage of UEFA Euro 2012, and also appeared on Craig Doyle Live on 11 June 2012. In June 2013, he was part of RTÉ Sport's coverage of the 2013 FIFA Confederations Cup alongside Ronnie Whelan and Kenny Cunningham. He was also part of RTÉ Sport's studio coverage of the 2014 FIFA World Cup, the UEFA Euro 2016, the 2018 FIFA World Cup, UEFA Euro 2020, 2022 FIFA World Cup, and UEFA Euro 2024.

== Personal life ==
Sadlier got married in 2019 and has a son born in 2023. Sadlier has spoken publicly of suffering from depression, particularly following the death of fellow professional Gary Speed. Sadlier holds a BSc in Sports Science from the University of Surrey and a Higher Diploma and MA in Psychotherapy from Dublin Business School. His autobiography called Recovering was released in 2019 and won the 2019 Irish Sports Book of the Year award.

== Honours ==
Millwall

- Football League Second Division: 2000–01
- Football League Trophy runner-up: 1998–99
