= Tracy Piggott =

British-born jockey and broadcaster

- Born: 1966 (age 59–60); England
- Occupation: Broadcaster
- Children: 1
- Parent: Lester Piggott (father)
- Relatives: Ernest Piggott (great-grandfather)

Tracy Piggott (born 1966) is a British-born former jockey and broadcaster, best known for her work commentating on horse racing on Irish state broadcaster RTÉ.

== Early life ==
Piggott is the daughter of Susan Armstrong and champion jockey Lester Piggott and member of an English family which has been involved in horse racing since the eighteenth century. Her great-grandfather Ernest Piggott won the Grand National as a jockey three times, in 1912, 1918 and 1919, while her grandfather Keith Piggott won the Grand National as a trainer in 1963. Piggott has a sister, ex-eventer Maureen, and a half-brother, Jamie. She has one daughter, born in 2007.

== Career ==
Piggott worked as a "galloper" (exercise rider or work rider) for horse trainers in the US. She moved to England to work with her mother, buying and selling horses. She moved to Ireland in 1986. where she worked as an assistant to horse trainer Tommy Stack for two years. She competed as a jockey at several meets, winning the Ladies' Race in Leopardstown in 1988. The head of RTE Sports asked her to audition as a broadcaster, with her first live programme being in June 1989 at the Derby weekend at Curragh.

She worked as a broadcaster with RTÉ until 2020, concentrating primarily on horse racing, but also the coverage for three Olympic Games, the Special Olympics and the Paralympics. She has been a pitch-side reporter for rugby internationals and Heineken Cup matches as well as greyhound racing and showjumping. In the late 1990s, she was the presenter on the flagship sports programme Sports Stadium.

Piggott has worked on television programmes including:

- The Young Prince of Ballydoyle (narrator)
- At the End of the Day (presenter)
- The Sporting Year (host)
- The Restaurant (guest), while in 2013 she was a contestant on
- 2013 Celebrity MasterChef Ireland (contestant) She was the third contestant to be eliminated.

=== Charity ===
She is a member of the Irish Sports Council, and has worked on behalf of charities., and Playing for Life.

- She set up the charity Playing for Life, which aimed to "help communities in Africa by creating an educational series of games, focusing on health, self-respect, friendship, social integration, participation and team skills."
- In 1998 she swam across the Galway Bay to raise money for the John Durcan Leukaemia Trust
- In 2000 she cycled coast to coast across America to raise money for the National Council for the Blind of Ireland
- She also supported Racing for Rosalyn

== Personal life ==
She got engaged to Stephen Mahon in 2007. In late 2010, she took out an injunction against him, alleging that he had spread malicious falsehoods about her. Mahon had previously been convicted of animal cruelty.
