= Ryle Nugent =

Irish sports broadcaster and reporter

- Education: Blackrock College, broadcasting and journalism at Ballyfermot Senior College
- Occupations: Sports broadcaster; Reporter; Presenter
- Employer: Channel 4 (formerly employed by Raidió Teilifís Éireann (RTÉ))
- Known for: commentary
- Title: former Head of RTÉ Sport
- Predecessor: Glen Killane
- Spouse: Barbara Wiley

Ryle Nugent was born in Dublin and is an Irish sports broadcaster, reporter and former Head of RTÉ Sport. Prior to his appointment, he was RTÉ's commissioning editor for sport primarily specialising in rugby union. He is the resident rugby union commentator for RTÉ's television coverage of international and club competitions, such as the Six Nations Championship, Heineken Cup and Rugby World Cup. Nugent sometimes serves as the presenter of highlights of previously broadcast rugby union events.

He has provided RTÉ commentary from the 2000, 2004, 2008, 2012 and 2016 Summer Olympics and presented sports programmes such as The Grip and Against the Head. Other television appearances have included The Cafe and Dustin's Daily News.

== Education ==
Nugent was educated at Blackrock College in Dublin. He studied broadcasting and journalism at Ballyfermot Senior College, qualifying in 1990.

== Career ==
Before joining Channel 4, Nugent was an employee of Raidió Teilifís Éireann (RTÉ) for many years, providing rugby union commentary from 1999 and later became the broadcaster's head of television sport. He transferred to RTÉ from his news desk position at Dublin radio station 98FM in 1995 to work as a sports presenter on the young people's television programme The Grip. Nugent went on to become the presenter of rugby union highlights for RTÉ Sport during the 1999 Rugby World Cup, when he heard that RTÉ were searching for younger talent to replace established names such as Jim Sherwin and George Hamilton. His live television commentary debut was the Georgia versus Romania match at the World Cup. He later reflected upon having drunk so much coffee before the game that he vomited. In 2000, he was reported as having described Ireland's rugby union player and future captain, Brian O'Driscoll, in the early part of his career at the time, as being "a hard tackler" with "great hands".

Nugent also covers other sports such as football and golf. He was dispatched by RTÉ as one of thirty-eight members of its staff to cover the Summer Olympic Games that year, and was described in his country's national media as "running all over Sydney". In October 2002, Nugent was announced as the presenter of a new production by RTÉ Sport, titled Against the Head, to begin airing in January 2003. The rugby union magazine style programme returned to Irish television screens in January 2004. That year also saw Nugent return to RTÉ's Olympic coverage, this time in Athens, Greece.

Other high-profile moments of rugby union commentary came during the 2003 Rugby World Cup in Australia and the 2006 Heineken Cup Final in which Munster beat Biarritz Olympique. He appeared on the children's entertainment show Dustin's Daily News on 12 February 2007. Nugent performed another return to Olympic broadcasting in 2008 when he provided commentary for RTÉ from Beijing, China. He provided commentary for all games in the 2009 Six Nations Championship, in which Ireland won the Grand Slam and Triple Crown for the first time since 1948, and appeared on The Cafe on 20 March just prior to this achievement. Before this, he described his commentary on the 2007 Ireland versus England Six Nations match at Croke Park in Dublin as the highlight of his career.

He was a guest on The Cafe on 12 March 2010. On 8 October 2011, Nugent did the commentary for Ireland's Rugby World Cup Quarter Final match against Wales, replacing Hugh Cahill as lead commentator.

When the live televised France versus Ireland match in the 2012 Six Nations Championship was cancelled minutes prior to kick-off, prompting boos to ring out among disgruntled spectators inside a packed Stade de France, Nugent informed viewers from his Irish commentary box that "It is a dark day in the history of the Six Nations".

Nugent left RTÉ in 2018.

Nugent has worked for Virgin Media Television, covering rugby matches prior to and during the 2023 Rugby World Cup.

== Style ==
Nugent dresses in numerous layers to deliver his commentary, with The Irish Times once encountering him "wrapped in the sort of attire more accustomed to Johnny Fortycoats or an Arctic explorer, and with his sheepskin gloves holding onto his microphone for dear life". His delivery is one of "screeching anticipation" and, even when events are relatively calm, he has been known to "send dogs scurrying for cover". Nugent prepares for this delivery by arriving at the match ground two hours before kick-off to perform a sound check. He typically engages in conversation with the team doctor or other members of the backroom staff to ensure there is nothing new he has not been familiarised with regarding the players.
