= Soccer Republic =

- Presented by: Peter Collins
- Country of origin: Ireland

Production
- Running time: 60 minutes

Original release
- Network: RTÉ Two
- Release: 10 March 2014 – 2021

Related
- Monday Night Soccer

Soccer Republic was RTÉ's main football television programme. It was shown on RTÉ Two on Monday nights during the Irish football season, showing highlights of recent matches in Irish football's top division, the League of Ireland Premier Division and also features on the Republic of Ireland team. The show was a re-branded version of the previous highlights programme Monday Night Soccer which aired from 2008 until 2013.

Soccer Republic was presented by RTÉ presenter Peter Collins. The first edition of Soccer Republic was screened on RTÉ Two at 11.05pm on 10 March 2014.

== Overview ==
The show was broadcast weekly on Monday evenings live from RTÉ Studio 6. Highlights of every League of Ireland Premier Division game were shown, with interviews with the managers and players, followed by studio analysis. It was normally broadcast on Mondays at 11:05 PM to 12:05 AM. However, while the 2014 FIFA World Cup coverage was on RTÉ Two, Soccer Republic was only half an hour long from 7:30 PM to 8:00 PM on Monday.

== Cancellation ==
RTE announced the shows' cancellation in early 2021 ahead of the upcoming League of Ireland season, following seven years on air.

== Presenters ==
The following is a full list of guests on the show:

- Martin O'Neill
- Roy Keane
- Paul McGrath
- Ray Houghton
- Ronnie Whelan
- Kenny Cunningham
- Keith Gillespie
- Alex McLeish

The following is a list of panelists who regularly featured on the show:

- Pat Fenlon
- Richie Sadlier
- Michael Healy-Rae
- Tony McDonnell
- Brian Kerr
