= Against the Head =

- Presented by: Joanne Cantwell
- Country of origin: Ireland
- No. of seasons: 9

Production
- Running time: 30 minutes

Original release
- Network: RTÉ Two
- Release: February 2003 – present

Against the Head is a weekly rugby magazine programme, broadcast on RTÉ Two and presented by Joanne Cantwell with regular panellists Shane Byrne, and Irish Times rugby correspondent Gerry Thornley with various other guests throughout the series. The programme goes out on a Monday night usually running for thirty minutes and has been broadcast since 2003. It was previously presented by Con Murphy until 2008.

The programme brings viewers a mix of interviews, highlights and reviews, as well as discussion on the burning issues in Irish rugby. The series runs for the busiest period of the rugby season usually from February to May, and takes in the RBS 6 Nations Championship, Heineken Cup and AIB League and Cup, and brings its audience the latest news on developments within the game.
