= Trom agus Éadrom =

Television series

- Presented by: Liam Ó Murchú
- Country of origin: Ireland

Original release
- Network: Raidió Teilifís Éireann
- Release: 1975 – 1985

Trom agus Éadrom (Irish pronunciation: [ˈt̪ˠɾˠʊmˠ ˌaɡəsˠ ˈeːd̪ˠɾˠəmˠ]; meaning "Heavy and Light") is an Irish television variety show which was broadcast bilingually in Irish and English by Raidió Teilifís Éireann between 1975 and 1985. The show was presented by Liam Ó Murchú, who became a household name for his catchphrase "bualadh bos" (English: "clap hands").
