= RTÉ Television Centre =

Broadcasting campus for Irish network Raidió Teilifís Éireann

Coordinates: 53.315634°N 6.223251°W

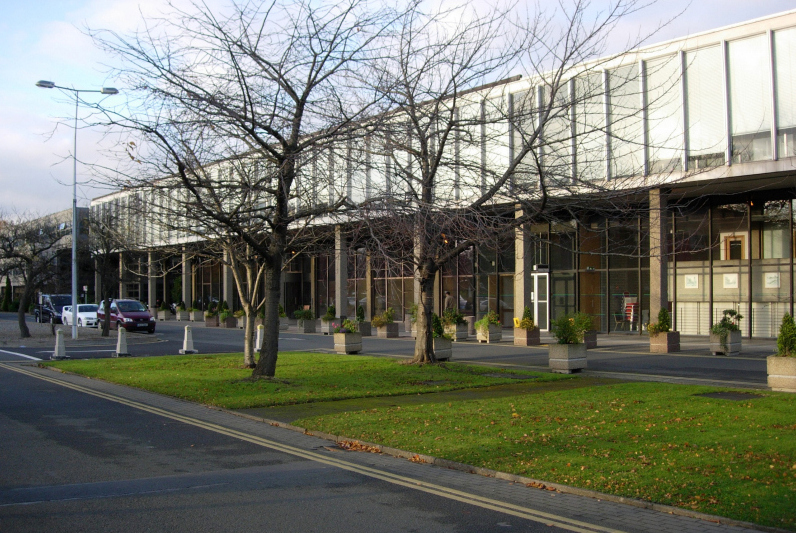
- The Television Centre on the RTÉ campus.

General information
- Type: Television studios
- Location: RTÉ Campus, Donnybrook, Dublin, Ireland
- Current tenants: RTÉ Television
- Construction started: 1960
- Completed: 1962
- Renovated: 1979
- Cost: £500,000
- Client: RTÉ

Design and construction
- Architect: Ronnie Tallon
- Architecture firm: Scott Tallon Walker
- Main contractor: Messrs. E. Stone & Sons Ltd.
- Awards: Royal Institute of the Architects of Ireland Gold Medal

The RTÉ Television Centre is a television studio building which is owned by Ireland's national public service broadcaster Raidió Teilifís Éireann. It is one of a number of buildings that make up the RTÉ campus located at Donnybrook in South Dublin. The building houses the main production studios for RTÉ Television, the control rooms for all RTÉ's TV channels, and RTÉ's main newsroom. Along with a number of other buildings on the campus, it is included in Dublin City Council's Record of Protected Structures (Ref. No. 8888)

== History ==
When plans for an Irish national television station were developed in the late 1950s attention quickly turned to a suitable location for the new television studios and adjoining offices. By September 1959, a 25-acre area of land on the Stillorgan road in Donnybrook became the favoured site for the new television production centre.

On 3 October 1960, the new Radio Éireann Authority signed a £500,000 contract for the construction of the television centre and offices at the proposed location. A few hours after this the contractors began to move in. The contract was awarded to Messrs. E. Stone & Sons Ltd. from Thorncastle street in Dublin, one of four firms invited to tender. The building when completed in 1962 contained the first purpose-built television studios in Ireland, as existing studios in Belfast had been set up in converted buildings.

At the beginning of "The Troubles" in Northern Ireland, a bomb damaged the front of the building early on the morning of 5 August 1969. The Ulster Volunteer Force (UVF) claimed responsibility, this being the first bomb that they had ever planted in the Republic of Ireland. The bombing took place during the protest campaign by the Northern Ireland Civil Rights Association but before the 1969 riots.

== The building ==
=== Design ===
The Television Centre, designed by the Scott-Tallon-Walker firm of architects in Dublin, is 30 feet high with the tops of the main studios rising a further 15 feet above the roof line. In all there are eight television studios in the building, four main production studios; 1, 2, 4, and 5, a news studio; 3, and three presentation studios; 6, 7, and 8, as well as studios for radio news bulletins.

=== Studios ===
There were only three studios in the original building completed in 1962, however, since then a number of new studios and sound stages have been added to the existing complex.

From the early 1970s all the studios were gradually converted to colour operation starting with Studio 3, the news studio, and finishing with Studio 1 in 1976. Since January 2019 all of the studios have been upgraded to High Definition standard.

In the late 1970s RTÉ's schedule was increasing and expanding, especially with the launch of Ireland's second channel RTÉ 2 in November 1978. There was also a growing need for a new larger television studio, as Studio 1 was seen as being too small for many productions.

Studios 4 and 5 were constructed towards the end of the 1970s. Studio 4 measures 6,525 sq ft (606.2 m^{2}), making it the largest purpose-built television studio in Ireland. From the early 1980s onwards it would be home to the majority of RTÉ's large audience based shows.

In 1995 Studio 4 was redeveloped to better cater for audiences, and a new permanent seating rostra was built into it that can accommodate audiences of up to 300. Today Studio 4 is one of the busiest studios in the Television Centre, accommodating The Late Late Show, The Ray D'Arcy Show and Prime Time all in one week.

As well as the studios the building also houses the control rooms for the various channels, MCR (Master Control Room), technical areas for video playout, edit suites, graphics area, scene dock, dressing rooms, green rooms, makeup area, wardrobe, radio news studios, and RTÉ's main newsroom.

In 2022 two new “visual radio” studios were opened, one in the television centre and another in the adjoining Stage 7 building. The studios, which are primarily intended for radio news output, are equipped with small unmanned cameras that allow the various radio programmes to be seen on the RTÉ News channel and their online services.

In an adjoining building there are also two sound stages which are used for dramas, soaps etc. such as RTÉ's flagship soap Fair City, and the award-winning drama Love/Hate. The sound stages are named A and B and both measure 5,865 sq ft (544.9 m^{2}).

==== Studio 1 ====
4,180 sq ft (388 m^{2})

Completed in 1962, Studio 1 was originally the largest studio in the television centre and was originally designed for variety shows, dramas and musicals. The studio can comfortably accommodate an audience of 120. It is currently home to many of RTÉ's game shows, including Winning Streak and Know The Score.

Former programmes recorded or transmitted included:

- Kenny Live
- The Late Late Show
- Insurrection
- Eurofashion '68
- Tolka Row
- The Dress Dance
- An Bullaí
- An Triall
- How Long is Kissing Time?
- The True Story of Red Riding Hood
- The Last Troubadour
- Nightlife
- Going into Exile
- The Loves of Cass McGuire
- Lady Windemere's Fan
- Antigone
- Killraggart 17
- National Song Contest
- Hair Today, Gone Tomorrow
- Aimen High
- The Lads
- Strings in the Air
- Sing a Song
- Where in the World?
- Black Box
- The Gold Star Award
- Legion of the Rearguard
- Sing a Christmas Song
- The Lyrics Board
- To Tell the Truth
- Conversations on a Homecoming
- Facets Irish
- The Plough and the Stars
- The Ante Room
- Make Mine Music
- Cabaret
- Star Time
- Reach for the Stars
- Your Christmas Phil
- Teems of Times
- Live Aid
- Sons and Mothers
- Lifelines

==== Studio 2 ====
1,980 sq ft (184 m^{2})

Studio 2, the second of the original studios, was designed for interviews, panel games and current affairs programmes.

Programmes recorded or transmitted included:

- A Cheap Bunch of Nice Flowers
- 2Phat
- Omega Point
- Piano Plus
- The Whole Shebang
- Talkabout
- SBB ina Shuí
- Pulse
- Tinteán
- National Lottery Draws
- Buntús Cainte
- Wanderly Wagon
- Today Tonight
- Questions and Answers

==== Studio 3 ====
728 sq ft (67.6 m^{2})

RTÉ's main television news bulletins are aired from Studio 3. The original studio was extended and equipped with unmanned robotic cameras in 2009. During December 2018 and January 2019 the studio was refurbished and upgraded to High Definition working to coincide with a relaunch of RTÉ News presentation on Monday 28 January 2019. The refurbishment of the studio and news presentation was part of a €1.7 million revamp.

==== Studio 4 ====
6,525 sq ft (606.2 m^{2})

This is the largest fully equipped television studio in Ireland and it can accommodate audiences of up to 300. The studio is home to programmes such as The Late Late Show, The Tommy Tiernan Show and Claire Byrne Live.

Studio 4 was completed in 1982 but did not enter full operation until 1986 when the popular weekday afternoon talk/entertainment show "Live at 3" was produced from the studio.

The studio was completely overhauled and refurbished in the summer of 1995 which saw it gain a permanent audience rostra installed which could accommodate audiences of up to 300 if required. The long running Late Late Show and other key audience based entertainment shows moved into Studio 4 from Autumn 1995.

==== Studio 5 ====
2,415 sq ft (224.4 m^{2})

Built in the late 1970s, Studio 5 was the first studio in the television centre to be upgraded to High Definition. Programmes broadcast from the studio include Prime Time, The Sunday Game, Soccer Republic, Against the Head, as well as RTÉ's coverage of the FIFA World Cup, UEFA Champions League, UEFA European Championship and Six Nations Championship. Studio 5 was used as the main election studio for RTÉ's 2020 general election coverage in February 2020, supported by Studio 3 and the RTÉ Newsroom.

==== Studio 6 ====
540 sq ft (50 m^{2})

==== Studio 7 ====
400 sq ft (37 m^{2})

==== Studio 8 ====
400 sq ft (37 m^{2})

==== Stage A ====
5,865 sq ft (544.9 m^{2})

==== Stage B ====
5,865 sq ft (544.9 m^{2})

==== Green Screen Stage ====
430 sq ft (40 m^{2})

== Gallery ==
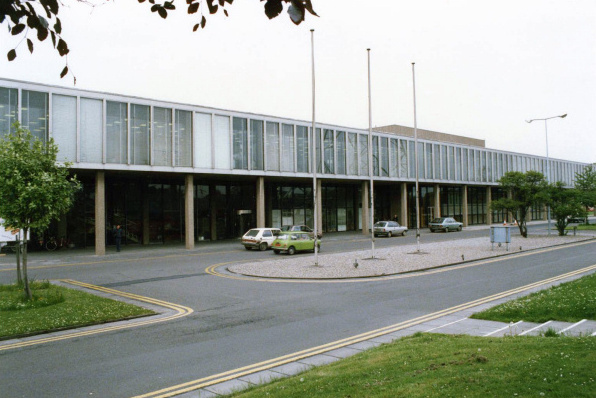

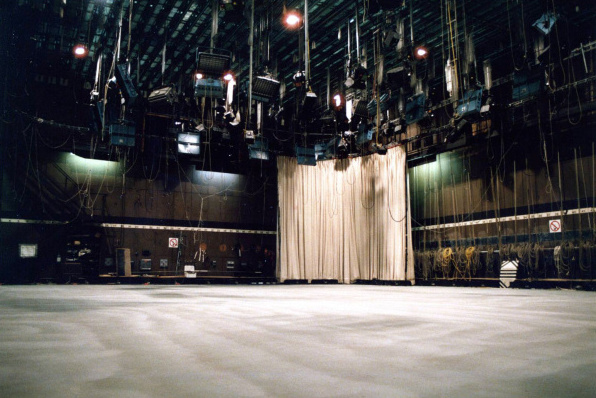

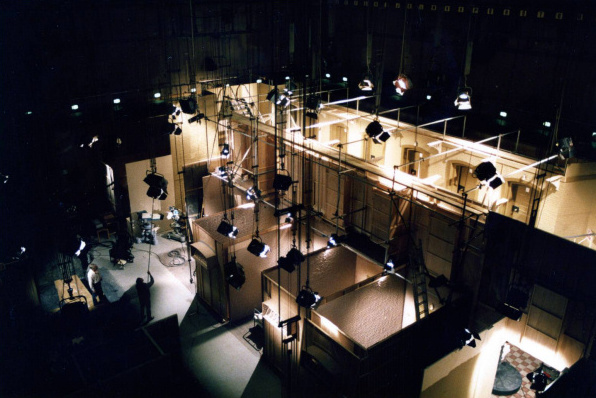

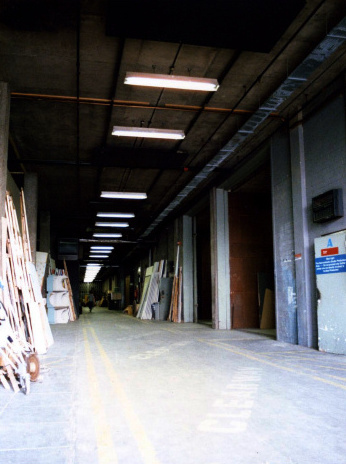
