= Joanne Cantwell =

Irish sports presenter (born 1979)

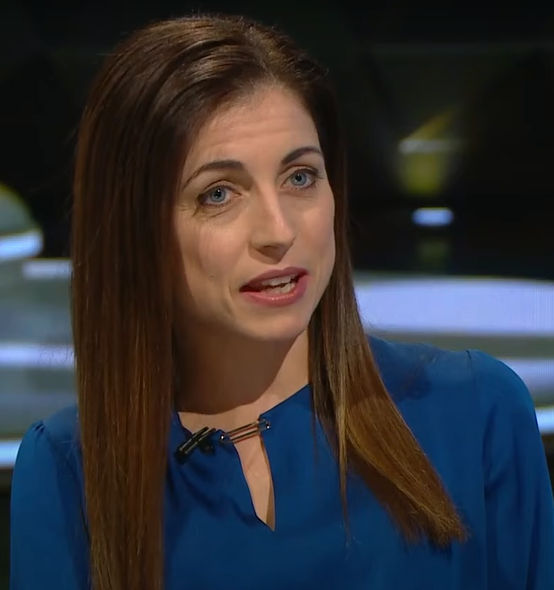
- Cantwell in 2020
- Born: 30 September 1979 (age 46); Dublin, Ireland
- Employer: Raidió Teilifís Éireann (RTÉ)
- Known for: Sports journalist
- Children: 2

Joanne Cantwell (born 30 September 1979) is an Irish sports presenter and journalist.

== Early life and education ==
Cantwell was raised in Dublin and is one of five sisters. She studied journalism at Dublin City University. She is married, has two daughters, and lives in Ongar, County Dublin.

== Sporting background ==
Cantwell participated in several competitive sports during her teenage years. She played ladies' Gaelic football for the Dublin county team. She was named Young Dublin Player of the Year in 1997 and received an All-Star nomination in 1998.

== Journalism career ==
Cantwell began her journalism career while still in university, covering weekend sport on radio station FM104. In 2001, she joined the independent Irish channel TV3, where she worked as a producer on news bulletins and presented the programme Sports Tonight.

She later joined RTÉ, Ireland's national broadcaster. Cantwell has presented and reported across a range of sports programming, including the weekly former rugby magazine programme Against the Head on RTÉ2, and contributed as a match reporter on Premier Soccer Saturday. During the summer months, she was working as a reporter on The Sunday Game, Raidió Teilifís Éireann's flagship Gaelic games programme aired on RTÉ2 every Sunday during the All-Ireland Football and Hurling Championships.

In April 2016, Cantwell became the first woman to anchor RTÉ's UEFA Champions League coverage. In February 2018, she was announced as the new studio presenter of The Sunday Game, succeeding Michael Lyster following his retirement at the end of the 2018 GAA season.

I kid you not. I was also told that Joanne Cantwell had lost confidence in my abilities as an analyst. Joe Brolly in an interview
