= Darragh Maloney =

Irish sports broadcaster (born 1972)

- Born: 5 December 1972 (age 53); Beaumont, County Dublin, Ireland
- Occupation: Broadcaster
- Known for: Sport

Darragh Maloney (born 5 December 1972) is an Irish sports presenter, working on RTÉ radio and television. Maloney joined RTÉ in 1995 from local Dublin radio station, FM104 and was previously the studio host of weekly show Premier Soccer Saturday on RTÉ Two. He has commentated on three FIFA World Cups including the 2022 World Cup Final in Qatar, four European Football Championships and worked on numerous UEFA Champions League and Ireland international games as presenter and commentator. Maloney is also a regular commentator on GAA for television and radio on RTÉ. He has been one of the studio presenters for RTÉ's coverage of the last six Olympic Games.
