= Jimmy Magee =

Irish sports broadcaster

- Born: 31 January 1935; New York City, United States
- Died: 20 September 2017 (aged 82)
- Occupation: Sports broadcaster
- Employer(s): Raidió Teilifís Éireann, UTV (1995), Channel 4 (1994)
- Title: Memory Man
- Spouse: Marie (died in 1989)
- Children: 5

Jimmy Magee (31 January 1935 – 20 September 2017) was an American-born Irish sports broadcaster, known as "The Memory Man", he spent over half a century in sports broadcasting, and presented radio and television coverage of the Olympic Games since 1968 and the FIFA World Cup since 1966. By the time of his retirement he was the longest-serving sports commentator in the English-speaking world.

== Early and personal life ==
Jimmy Magee was born in 1935 in New York City in the United States, to Patrick (Paddy) Magee and his wife Rose (née Mackin). The family returned to Ireland shortly after his birth. Magee and his three siblings were subsequently raised in Cooley, County Louth. As a child Magee was influenced by the sports commentary of the legendary Gaelic games broadcaster Michael O'Hehir. He recalls commentating as a seven-year-old for his next-door neighbour on a variety of imaginary games that the young Magee was also playing in. He has also spoken of making up his own radio commentary in a field at a young age.

After being educated locally, Magee secured a full-time clerical post with Dundalk, Newry and Greenore Railway. He and his wife, Marie, married on 11 October 1955 and had five children. Paul, a soccer player with Shamrock Rovers F.C. (winning the League Cup in 1977), died of motor neuron disease aged 51 years in May 2008; Linda (b. 1959); June (b. 1961); Patricia (b. 1962); and Mark (b. 1970).

1989 was an emotionally trying year for Magee as his mother and wife died within months of each other, Marie dying at the young age of 54.

Magee died on 20 September 2017 after falling ill during the previous days. Many tributes were made to him including Taoiseach Leo Varadkar who said ""His commentaries were legendary and based on a breadth of sporting knowledge that was peerless". RTÉ Head of Sport Ryle Nugent said "It’s hard to put it into words, the man meant an inordinate amount to so many people, I think he was the soundtrack to many generations".

== Career ==
While still working with Dundalk, Newry and Greenore Railway Magee began his broadcasting career. He started out as a reporter for the Radio Éireann programme Junior Sports Magazine. Other contributors on the programme were Jim Tunney and Peter Byrne, former football correspondent with The Irish Times. On leaving his Railway job, Magee presented a number of sponsored radio programmes before concentrating on sport. He was a producer, presenter and script writer for Radio Éireann's sponsored programmes in the 1950s and 1960s.

Jimmy joined Raidió Teilifís Éireann in 1956. In 1966 Magee covered his first World Cup for RTÉ Radio. He did likewise for the 1970 FIFA World Cup before transferring to television for the 1974 FIFA World Cup finals. In all he has provided commentary at eleven World Cups – his latest commentary coming at the 2010 FIFA World Cup in South Africa.

Magee's column or quiz had appeared in every single publication of the Sunday World since the first edition in 1973.

Magee has also been a staple of RTÉ's coverage of the Olympic Games. Beginning at the 1968 Summer Olympics in Mexico City, he has attended the eleven subsequent Olympic games as a commentator with RTÉ. In 2012, he commentated on the boxing for RTÉ at the 2012 Summer Olympics in London, including Katie Taylor's gold medal-winning fight. At the 2016 Summer Olympics, Magee provided commentary on the football.

From 1987 to 1998 Magee hosted Know Your Sport, a sports-themed quiz show, along with George Hamilton. Magee's broadcasting career also saw him provide commentary for over 200 international football games, 30 European Cup finals, multiple Tour de France cycle races, World Athletic Championships and boxing. He also narrated numerous videos on Sport in general such as The purple and Gold, Meath return to Glory, etc.

A freelancer Jimmy worked for Channel 4 in 1994 and signed for UTV in 1995 on a three-year contract where a lifetime ambition of commentating on All Ireland Finals was achieved. He commentated on three finals in both hurling and football.

He launched his memoir, Memory Man, in 2012.

Some of Magee's one-liners in commentaries have become famous or infamous (what are affectionately known in the broadcasting industry as Colemanballs after the famed commentating clangers of BBC broadcaster David Coleman).

As well as sports, Magee was also involved in the music industry. He co-founded the record label Release Records with Mick Clerkin and compiled the first ever Irish Top Ten. He was a songwriter, and released the single "These Old Eyes Have Seen It All" in 2014, which peaked at #4 in the Irish Singles Chart. Magee released the single to raise awareness and funds for Motor Neurone Disease research.

== Awards and honours ==
In 1972 Magee won a Jacob's Award for his radio sports commentaries. In 1989, he was the subject of a special tribute show on The Late Late Show.

At the 2012 Summer Olympics in London, the International Olympic Committee presented him with a replica of its torch.
