= Peter Collins (broadcaster) =

Irish sportscaster

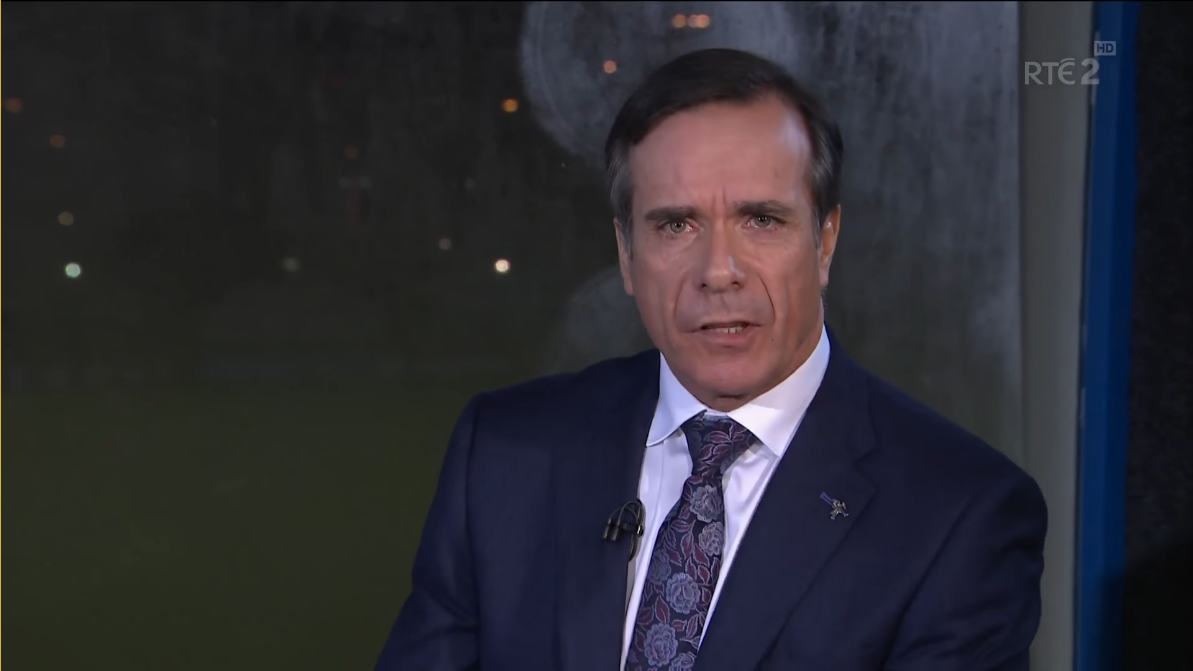
- Collins in 2020
- Born: 22 February 1964 (age 61)
- Occupation: Sportscaster
- Employer: Raidió Teilifís Éireann (RTÉ)
- Known for: Contributions to RTÉ Sport

Peter Collins (Irish: Peadar Ó Coileáin) is an Irish sportscaster for national broadcaster Raidió Teilifís Éireann (RTÉ). He is seen on RTÉ's coverage of live Soccer, Gaelic games, Formula One, track & field athletics and Moto GP. He is the current presenter of RTEs International, Champions League and 'live' League of Ireland football coverage.

Collins is a native of Westport, County Mayo.

Peter Collins played football for Westport United FC and won a Connaught Cup medal with the club back in 1987.

He is a father.

== Career ==
Prior to focusing solely on sports broadcasting, Collins was a radio DJ on RTÉ 2fm, and also occasionally presented the RTÉ TV / radio simulcast The Beatbox.

Collins has presented and/or commentated for RTÉ at all major championships (Olympic Games, FIFA World Cup, UEFA European Championship) since 1990.
