= George Hamilton (broadcaster) =

Irish broadcaster (born 1950)

- Born: 2 January 1950 (age 76); Belfast, Northern Ireland
- Occupation: Broadcaster
- Employer: Raidió Teilifís Éireann (RTÉ)

George Hamilton (born 2 January 1950) is an Irish broadcaster born in Belfast, Northern Ireland. He is best known as the chief football commentator for RTÉ Sport, for which he also commentates on other sporting events, such as the Olympic Games. He presents a classical music programme on RTÉ Lyric FM on Saturdays and Sundays called The Hamilton Scores.

== Early life and education ==
Hamilton was christened in the same Presbyterian church as George Best. His father Jimmy played for Cliftonville, but George was a Glentoran ‘superfan’.

While a student at Methodist College, Belfast, Hamilton was, for a time, principal cellist with the school orchestra. He then studied German and French at Queen's University, Belfast.

== Broadcasting career ==
Hamilton began his commentary career with BBC Sport, before joining RTÉ Sport eight years later in 1984. He had previously worked for RTÉ during the 1978 FIFA World Cup. Since 2003, he has worked for RTÉ Lyric FM (Ireland's classical radio station) on Saturday mornings. For many years, he fronted a popular weekly quiz show on RTÉ, Know Your Sport, alongside fellow commentator Jimmy Magee.

Hamilton was chief commentator for RTÉ Sport's coverage of the 2010 FIFA World Cup in South Africa, the ninth one in which he has been involved. Hamilton was RTÉ's chief commentator at Euro 2012, and commentated on all of Ireland's matches in the competition. He was involved in the coverage of the Olympic Games from the 1980 Moscow Olympics to the 2020 Tokyo Olympics.

Hamilton left RTÉ in July 2024 after UEFA Euro 2024, and after 40 years with the broadcaster. In September 2024 he joined Premier Sports as a commentator.

== Memorable quotes ==
Hamilton is known for his use of colourful phrases and memorable quotes when commentating on games, his phrase describing David O'Leary's penalty against Romania in the 1990 World Cup, "The nation holds its breath", was used for a book of Irish football quotations, compiled by Eoghan Corry, for which Hamilton wrote the foreword.

The sports humour website, DangerHere.com, takes its title from another quote by Hamilton: "And Bonner has gone 165 minutes of these championships without conceding a goal. Oh danger here..."

=== Other examples ===
- "Real Madrid are like a rabbit in the glare of the headlights in the face of Manchester United's attacks. But this rabbit comes with a suit of armour in the shape of two precious away goals"
- "And Ireland have got to contain the brothers Baggio" [Later in the game…] "The Baggio brothers, of course, are not related"
- "When I said they'd scored two goals, of course I meant they'd scored one"

== Personal life ==
On 16 August 2011, Hamilton felt unwell and had a suspected heart attack, and later had several hours of emergency bypass surgery at the Blackrock Clinic in Dublin after being transferred from St. Vincent's University Hospital. He recovered, and resumed both his commentating and radio show.
