= Atheist Ireland =

Atheist association

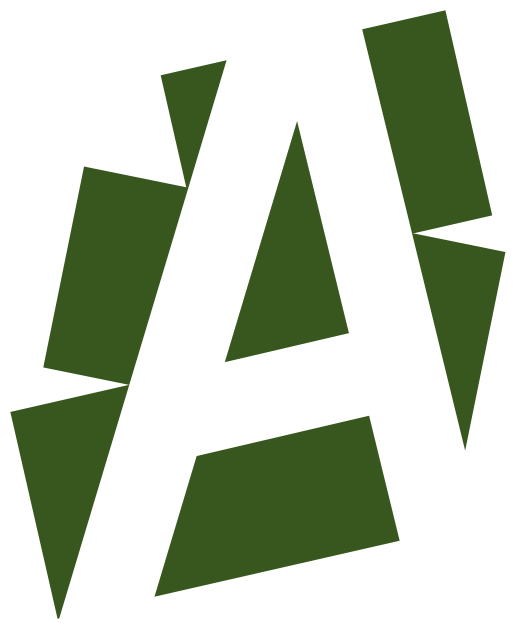
- Formation: 30 November 2008; 17 years ago
- Region served: Ireland
- Chairperson: Michael Nugent
- Affiliations: Humanists International; National Women's Council of Ireland; Coalition to Repeal the 8th Children's Rights Alliance; International Coalition Against Blasphemy Laws
- Website: atheist.ie

Atheist Ireland is an association of atheists based in Ireland. The group was initially founded by members of Atheist.ie, an online community set up by Seamus Murnane in June 2006. Its current chairperson is writer and activist Michael Nugent. Atheist Ireland is a former member of Atheist Alliance International, and a former member of Humanists International (previously known as The International Humanist and Ethical Union), and current member of The Coalition to Repeal the 8th, Children's Rights Alliance, the International Coalition Against Blasphemy Laws and the National Women's Council of Ireland. The group estimates it has about 500 members.

== Background ==
In Ireland, the Roman Catholic Church retains an influence in public-funded state services such as the provision of education and health care. Atheist Ireland oppose this influence.

Atheist Ireland formation started in 2006 from an online forum set up by Seamus/James "Catherder" Murnane. The forum proved popular and quickly grew into a social and issue-focused group. In October 2008, forum members discussed setting up a physical campaigning group.

Atheist Ireland was founded at a meeting in the Central Hotel in Dublin on 30 November 2008. Its stated aims were to promote atheism, reason and secularism. Michael Nugent was elected as chairperson at the meeting.

Atheist Ireland describes itself as an advocacy group for secularism, rationality, pluralism and human rights. It is run by a management committee consisting of four elected officials, chairperson, Secretary, Finance Officer and Regional Officer and other co-opted volunteers. It is a voluntary, non-profit, unincorporated civil society organisation. The current committee consists of Michael Nugent (chairperson), Sean O'Shea (Finance Officer), Kelvin O'Connor (Regional Officer/Membership Officer) and Helen O'Shea (Secretary). Past committee members include Derek Walsh as Editor of Secular Sunday, Ashling O'Brien who campaigned on repealing the 8th and spoke to the Citizen's Assembly on this issue and John Hamill of thefreethoughtprophet.com. Jane Donnelly has taken on the role of human rights officer focusing on the Irish education system.

== Activities ==
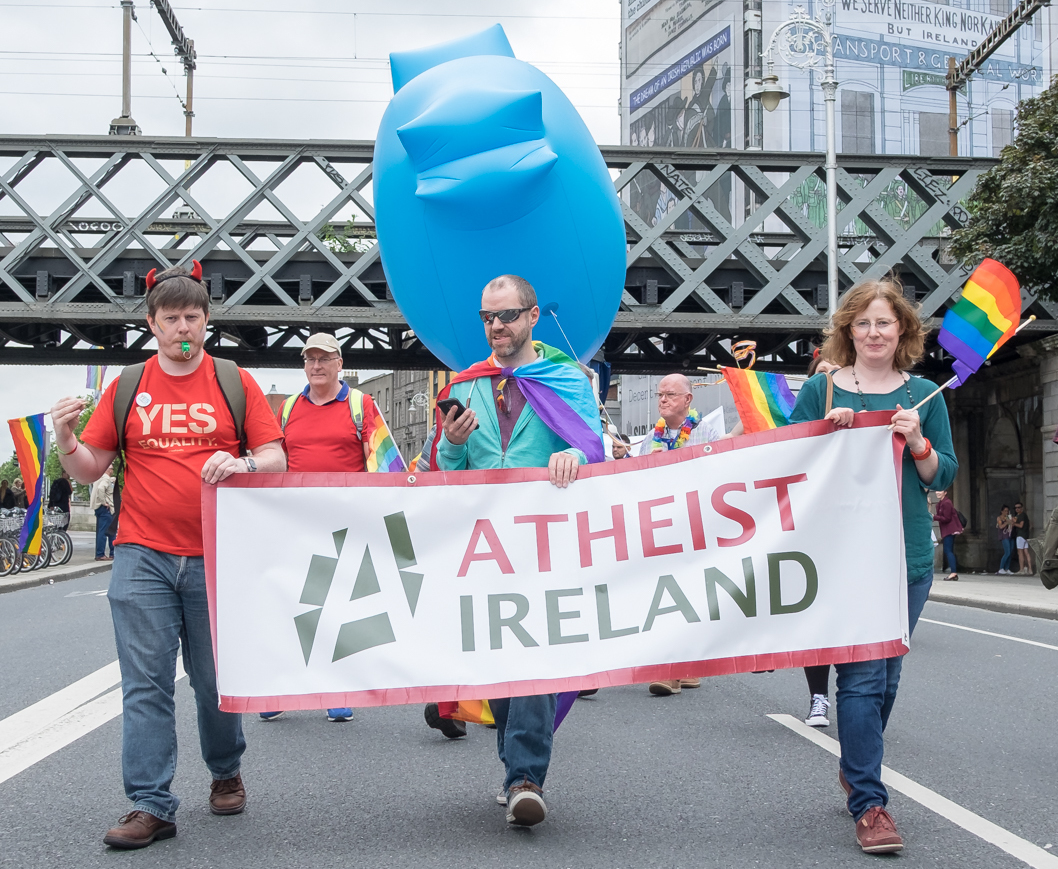
Atheist Ireland at Dublin Pride 2016

Not long after its formation, members of the Atheist Ireland community appeared on radio station Clare FM to discuss the role of atheism in Irish culture. Since then Atheist Ireland spokespersons Michael Nugent, Jane Donnelly and John Hamill have frequently been interviewed on Irish media on freedom of thought issues.

In 2009, the Minister for Justice, Equality and Law Reform, Dermot Ahern, proposed amendments to the Defamation Bill, including a statutory offence of blasphemous libel prosecutable liable to a fine of up to €100,000. The proposed penalty was later reduced to €25,000. Atheist Ireland launched a campaign of opposition to the law. The group received support from author and scientist Richard Dawkins, politician Ivana Bacik, and writers Graham Linehan and Arthur Mathews, among others.

Chairperson Michael Nugent described the law as "silly and unjust", and highlighted other areas of the Irish Constitution which he felt were anomalous. He pointed out that to become a judge, a member of the Irish Council of State, or President of Ireland, a candidate must first swear a religious oath, and said that amendments were immediately required to address all such issues.

On 1 January 2010, the date on which the law came into effect, the group published a series of potentially blasphemous quotations on its website and vowed to challenge any resulting legal action. It also said that it would be holding a series of public meetings to launch a campaign for secular constitutional reform.

On 25 June 2015 Michael Nugent discussed Atheist Ireland's complaint about RTÉ broadcasting the Angelus, with George Hook on Newstalk Radio. Michael identified that he believed RTÉ think that their proposed alterations were appropriately inclusive, yet have failed to meet the requirements of a state-funded television network. He suggested renaming the Angelus to something with a more neutral name.

In 2016 Atheist Ireland refused an invitation to attend the state commemoration of the Easter Rising with the chairman, Michael Nugent saying "The 1916 Rising involved an undemocratic group killing innocent people, based on a Proclamation whose authors claimed that Ireland was acting through them in the name of God...The reason for using the wrong date is to make the commemorations coincide with the Christian holiday of Easter".

== Campaigns ==
=== Repeal of the Blasphemy Law ===
==== Defamation Bill ====
The Defamation Bill 2006 (enacted as the Defamation Act 2009) was developed by Minister for Justice, Brian Lenihan; however a shuffle in the cabinet meant Dermot Ahern would later assume responsibility for the bill. It was signed on 23 July 2009, to be commenced on 1 January 2010. Section 36 of the Act indicted the publication or utterance of blasphemous matter:

36.— (1) A person who publishes or utters blasphemous matter shall be guilty of an offence and shall be liable upon conviction on indictment to a fine not exceeding €25,000.

(2) For the purposes of this section, a person publishes or utters blasphemous matter if— (a) he or she publishes or utters matter that is grossly abusive or insulting in relation to matters held sacred by any religion, thereby causing outrage among a substantial number of the adherents of that religion, and

(b) he or she intends, by the publication or utterance of the matter concerned, to cause such outrage.

The justification for defining the law that had been in the Irish constitution since 1937 was "A spokesman for Mr Ahern maintained that under the Constitution the Minister must have a crime of blasphemy on the statute books. 'The Minister's hands are tied in this,' said the spokesman."

In response, Michael Nugent of Atheist Ireland said the proposed change was "silly and dangerous" and "incentivises outrage".

==== 25 blasphemous quotations ====
Atheist Ireland in response to the proposed law published 25 quotations from popular culture, the quotes were attributed to a wide range of sources including senior Irish politicians, highly popular artists, and authors, Jesus Christ and Muhammed. 12 of the quotes were by people not resident in Ireland and 10 were by people deceased or fictitious. Atheist Ireland claimed the goal was to demonstrate the law's ineffectiveness legally as well as its intention to protect religious belief as "the legislation is so ambiguous that it’s impossible to tell how it will be interpreted by the authorities. If they attempt to prosecute us [Atheist Ireland], we will take a constitutional challenge to the courts." New York Times columnist Robert Mackey described Atheist Ireland's efforts as seeming "particularly tame". In an article on the Lede blog he said:

What makes the Irish group’s attempt to break the law seem particularly tame is that it came on the same day last week that an ax-wielding man in Denmark tried to attack a cartoonist who offended millions of Muslims by publishing a drawing thought to show the Prophet Muhammad with a bomb in his turban. Say what you will about the Danish newspaper Jyllands-Posten, which intentionally published 12 cartoons mocking Islam in 2005, but that publication certainly showed how to cause the kind of outrage described in Ireland’s new law.

If the Irish atheists had wanted to make sure that they were breaking Ireland’s new law, they could simply have republished those cartoons, as the blogger Andrew Sullivan did last week in response to the attack on the cartoonist.

Members of Atheist Ireland themselves did not make any potentially blasphemous statements after the law was passed and no prosecutions or charges were ever considered or brought by the authorities.

"The proposed law does not protect religious belief; it incentivises outrage and it criminalises free speech. Under this proposed law, if a person expresses one belief about gods, and other people think that this insults a different belief about gods, then these people can become outraged, and this outrage can make it illegal for the first person to express his or her beliefs."

The publication received a lot of international attention to the law.

Shortly afterwards Pakistan began to adopt the wording of the Irish definition of blasphemy in a submission to the UN: "the uttering of matters that are grossly abusive or insulting in relation to matter held sacred by any religion, thereby causing outrage to a substantial number of adherents to that religion."

==== Proposed referendum ====
In March 2010, Ahern's press officer said the minister might ask the cabinet to hold a referendum to remove the reference to blasphemy from the Constitution in autumn 2010, at the same time tentatively planned for a referendum on an amendment relating to children's rights. Asked about this in the Dáil, Ahern did not offer any commitment, but said:

the programme for Government did indicate the possibility of referendums on a number of issues ... If we were to have a number of referendums on one day, it would be appropriate to put to the people a question on the section of the Constitution relating to blasphemous and seditious libel.

In the event, no referendums were held before the dissolution of the 30th Dáil in January 2011 and to date no referendum on the blasphemy law has been held.

A provisional date for the referendum was announced in September 2017 for a referendum on blasphemy to be held in October 2018.

==== 25-day walk ====
Atheist Ireland member Paul Gill in protest of the blasphemy law walked the length of Ireland i.e. from Mizen Head to Malin Head, to bring attention to the issue and encourage people to vote "yes". The walk began on the 6/5/10 (International Day of Reason) and finished 31 May 2010 taking him his goal of 25 days to achieve.

=== Secularising the Irish Constitution ===
In its current form the Irish Constitution (Bunreacht na hÉireann) stipulates many preferences for theism over atheism but more specifically for Christian religions over other religions. Throughout the document there are references to God, religious offences and the Holy Trinity; some act as barriers to public offices and other references restrict the document's protection of non-Christians.

- A legal requirement recognising crime of blasphemy as mentioned in Article 40, 6. 1° i)
- A religiously worded oath to be sworn by the President or a Judge in Article 12, 8. "In the presence of Almighty God I, do solemnly and sincerely promise and declare that I will maintain the Constitution of Ireland and uphold its laws, that I will fulfil my duties faithfully and conscientiously in accordance with the Constitution and the law, and that I will dedicate my abilities to the service and welfare of the people of Ireland. May God direct and sustain me."
- The preamble of the constitution asserts all authority is derived from the Holy Trinity and all actions are done in the name of it: "In the Name of the Most Holy Trinity, from Whom is all authority and to Whom, as our final end, all actions both of men and States must be referred, We, the people of Éire, Humbly acknowledging all our obligations to our Divine Lord, Jesus Christ..."

Atheist Ireland wishes for a referendum(s) that remove these references from the constitution.

=== Secular education ===
There are approximately 3,300 primary schools in Ireland. The vast majority (92%) are under the patronage of the Catholic Church who state "Catholic schools seek to reflect a distinctive vision of life and a corresponding philosophy of education, based on the Gospel of Jesus Christ", and that "Religious education, prayer and worship form an essential part of the curriculum, functioning at its core. Such learning is founded on faith and inspired by wonder at the transcendent mystery of God revealed in the complex beauty of the universe."

A small minority of (1.2%) are under either multi or inter denominational schooling under the patronage of Educate Together. The remainder of the schools are stewarded by other minority religions. In 2015, Secular Schools Ireland was established by a group of parents as a prospective patron body for national schools.

Schools run by religious organisations, but receiving public money and recognition, cannot discriminate against pupils based upon religion or lack thereof. A sanctioned system of preference does exist, where students of a particular religion may be accepted before those who do not share the ethos of the school, in a case where a school's quota has already been reached.

This system contrasts to Ireland's agreement to the United Nations International Covenant on Civil & Political Rights in which a UN Human Rights Committee drew attention to the Irish Government not upholding: Freedom from Discrimination (Article 2 of the Covenant); Freedom of Conscience (Article 18); the Rights of the Child (Article 24); and Equality before the law (Article 26).

Atheist Ireland has a resource website for secular education Teach Don't Preach that contains information on how to opt out of religion in schools. They also have a website to symbolically renounce church membership. They also took over CountMeOut.ie after it disbanded.

In August 2015 Atheist Ireland published the School P.A.C.T. campaign. This outlined the four areas they wanted reform for in the school system to remove "religious discrimination": Patronage, Access, Curriculum and Teaching.

In July 2016 Atheist Ireland published a report on the setting up of the State exam course on religion, developed by the National Council for the Curriculum and Assessment (NCCA). This was done under the Freedom of Information Act (FOI). This showed that the course was not suitable for all religions and none, as suggested by the NCCA and had a very strong bias towards Christianity.

In September 2017 Atheist Ireland used the Freedom of Information Act to investigate the level of "religious indoctrination" in Education and Training Board (ETB) Schools, the alternative to Catholic schools provided by state bodies. Again a strong bias towards Christianity, particularly Catholicism was found.

In November 2018 Atheist Ireland launched their One Oath For All campaign to enable conscientious atheists to hold the office of President, Judge, Taoiseach, or other members of the Council of State.

In September 2019 Atheist Ireland produced free lesson plans for primary schools which can also be used in conjunction with their 2017 self published book Is My Family Odd About Gods?.

In August 2020 Atheist Ireland commissioned barrister at law James Kane to give a legal opinion on specific questions on the right to opt out of religious instruction under Article 44.2.4 of the Irish constitution. This discusses the legality regarding students' rights to not attend religious instruction and to be supervised or be given an alternative subject, under Article 44.2.4° (and other Articles) of the Constitution.

Atheist Ireland make frequent national and international submissions on secularism related issues.

== See also ==
- Humanists International
- Irish Skeptics Society
- List of secularist organizations
