= WPLM =

WPLM can refer to:

- WPLM (AM), a radio station (1390 AM) licensed to Plymouth, Massachusetts, United States
- WPLM-FM, a radio station (99.1 FM) licensed to Plymouth, Massachusetts, United States
