= Michael Graham (radio personality) =

American political commentator

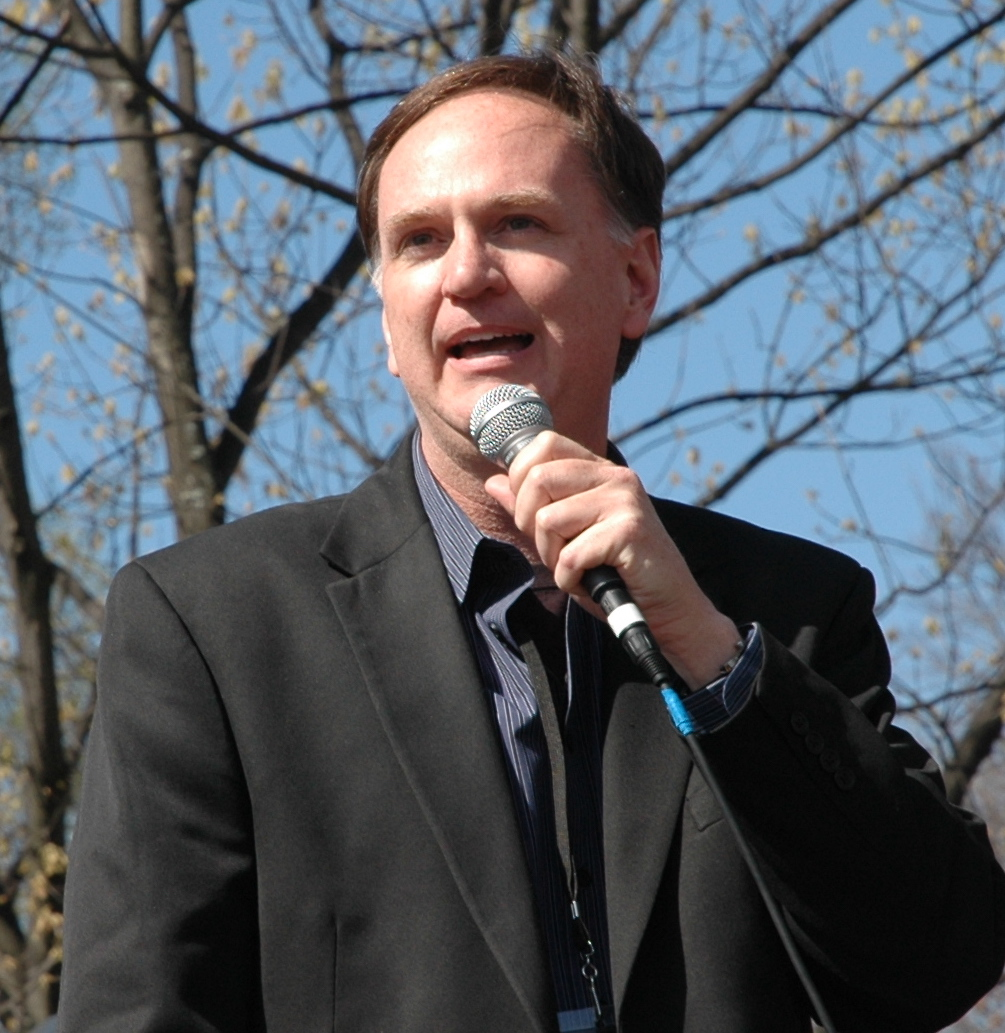
- Michael Graham in 2009 giving a speech in downtown Boston
- Born: Los Angeles, California, U.S.
- Education: Oral Roberts University
- Occupation: Radio host
- Years active: 1998–present
- Website: michaelgraham.com

Michael Graham (/ɡræm/) is an American conservative media personality and commentator based in Boston. He is a political editor for NH Journal, a columnist for the Boston Herald and a CBS News analyst.

== Career ==
Graham was born in Los Angeles, California, and raised in Pelion, South Carolina. A graduate of Oral Roberts University, he worked as a stand-up comedian before beginning his political career as a statewide coordinator for Pat Buchanan's Primary campaign in 1992. This experience led to his working in various Republican campaigns over the next few years. One of his candidates included Harold Worley, a Republican challenger to Senator Strom Thurmond in 1996.

In 1998, Graham moved to the talk radio circuit. Living up to his self-proclaimed description of being "loud, obnoxious and frequently fired," Graham held positions at seven stations in seven years, including stints in South Carolina, WRVA in Richmond, Virginia, and Washington, D.C., as well as Rightalk.com, an Internet radio outlet previously hosted by Accuracy in Media.

In 2002, Graham released his first printed book of original material, Redneck Nation: How the South Really Won the War through Warner Books.

Graham appeared on Real Time with Bill Maher. In addition, he made a number of appearances during 2005 on The O'Reilly Factor, Hardball with Chris Matthews, and Fox & Friends pertaining to his "America is at war with Islam" controversy. Graham also appeared as a panelist on the local Washington, D.C., television program Eye on Washington, until his dismissal from WMAL in August 2005. In November 2005, Graham joined the lineup of Boston's WTKK; his show, dubbed "The Natural Truth," aired from 3:00 p.m. to 7:00 p.m. His contract was not renewed and he parted ways with the station in December 2012, just before the station announced that it was abandoning the all-talk format and switching to music only.

Since 2005, Graham airs a weekly guest slot on the Monday edition of George Hook's drive time show, The Right Hook on Ireland's Newstalk. Speaking from an American right-wing perspective, many of Graham's views are often controversial to European audiences. In August 2009, Graham travelled to Dublin to present the show for three days while regular host George Hook was away.

On February 11, 2013, Graham began hosting a talk show on WCRN in Worcester, Massachusetts; the program was also heard on WBNW in Concord, WESO in Southbridge, WPLM in Plymouth, WXBR in Brockton and WCCM in Salem, New Hampshire. On August 5, 2013, his show premiered on the Boston Herald's new online radio station. Graham left the Boston radio market at the end of April 2014 and spent two years in Atlanta at Cumulus-owned radio station WYAY (All News 106.7). He left that station in May 2016 following an on-air segment where he accused fellow talk show host Kim Peterson of using drugs and insinuated that Peterson engaged in bestiality.

== Controversy ==
Graham has been involved in various controversies over his career.

- In July 2005, Graham used Islam and terrorism as the basis for a multi-day discussion on his WMAL talk radio show. A number of Graham's comments prompted over one hundred complaints to the station and the Council on American-Islamic Relations (CAIR) issued action alerts to its subscribers encouraging them to contact WMAL to urge that "Graham be reprimanded for his anti-Islam statements," ultimately prompting WMAL to suspend him. After 28 days, WMAL elected to terminate Graham stating that he violated station policy and disregarded "management direction" to redress the situation. The situation prompted angry editorials from Graham as well as appearances on nationally televised news programs to discuss the firing.
- Graham attended a rally to protest the Real ID Act, sponsored by CASA de Maryland in May 2005. He was photographed in an INS shirt, and was blocked from entering the event even as he showed ABC Radio credentials, with officials citing public safety. An altercation ensued, and police were called, with a second altercation occurring following their arrival. After questioning, Graham was allowed to enter the event with his shirt turned inside out.
- Graham was fired from his first commercial talk-radio job at WBT in Charlotte, North Carolina, after comments he made on-air in the wake of the Columbine massacre in 1999. Just hours after the shootings he said that the killing of athletes at the school was "one minor benefit of this otherwise horrible story."
- Graham drew criticism from blogs across the political spectrum for comments about Bill and Hillary Clinton made on CNN Headline News' Glenn Beck Show on June 20, 2007. Referring to a Clinton campaign ad based on the final episode of The Sopranos, Graham said "...didn't you at some point want to see, like, Paulie Walnuts, somebody come in here and just whack them both right there? Wouldn't that have been great?...Come on! Where's "Big Pussy"? Come on! Let's make it happen...I wanted that." Beck did not agree with Graham's comments.
- During a debate on the Irish radio channel Newstalk on May 28, 2010, the future President of Ireland, Michael D. Higgins, accused Graham of indulging in "the radio of hysterical ignorance" and urged him to "be proud to be a decent American rather than being just a wanker whipping up fear."

== Books ==
- Banned From Public Radio – Pinpoint Press (1995) ISBN 0964855305
- Clinton & Me: How Eight Years of a Pants-Free President Changed My Nation, My Family and My Life – Pinpoint Press (2000) ISBN 0964855321
- The Dumbest Generation – iPublish (2001) e-book
- Redneck Nation: How the South Really Won the War – Warner Books (2002) ISBN 0446528846
- That's No Angry Mob, That's My Mom: Team Obama's Assault on Tea-Party, Talk-Radio Americans – Regnery Publishing (2010) ISBN 978-1596986190
