= Après Match =

Irish comedy show

- Starring: Barry Murphy; Risteárd Cooper; Gary Cooke
- Country of origin: Republic of Ireland
- Original language: English
- No. of episodes: –

Production
- Running time: varied

Original release
- Network: Radio Telefís Éireann
- Release: 1996 – present

Après Match is an Irish comedy show normally screened after competitive Irish soccer matches on RTÉ. It is performed by Barry Murphy, Risteárd Cooper and Gary Cooke. It grew out of Barry Murphy and Risteárd Cooper's Frank's Euro Ting sketches which first enlivened RTÉ's coverage of Euro '96 for which the Republic of Ireland had failed to qualify.

"Après Match" proper was born when Gary Cooke joined the duo and soon became a fixture following each of Ireland's qualifying games for the 1998 World Cup.

The show mocks famous, mostly Irish, soccer stars and pundits including Bill O'Herlihy, Eamon Dunphy, Johnny Giles, Liam Brady, Frank Stapleton, Colm Murray, Graeme Souness, Jackie Fullerton and Pat Jennings as well as pundits from the British channels, including Richard Keys, Andy Gray, Jamie Redknapp, Gary Lineker, Alan Hansen, Des Lynam, Jimmy Hill, Gordon Strachan, Terry Venables, Ian St John, Jimmy Greaves, Trevor Brooking, Brian Clough, Kevin Keegan, Barry Davies, David Coleman, Brian Moore and Gabby Logan. They also mock Irish television and radio personalities such as Marian Finucane, Miriam O'Callaghan, Vincent Browne, Tom McGurk, David McWilliams, Brent Pope, George Hook, Joe Duffy, Pat Kenny and Gerry Ryan. As of 2010, they have added politicians such as Brian Cowen, Brian Lenihan and Joan Burton to their repertoire. The Après Match team have sold-out venues all over Ireland including Vicar Street, the Olympia Theatre and the Gaiety Theatre.

== Football sketches ==
=== 2006 World Cup sketches ===
Après Match performed sketches on RTÉ Two after many of the matches of the 2006 FIFA World Cup. As well as mocking the usual broadcasters, the team interviewed football fans in Germany. There were also a number of sketches following a mock attempt at a takeover by the Gaelic Athletic Association Head Assimilator of Foreign Games of the Match of the Day studios at BBC Television Centre in London and a Father Ted parody of FAI officials and Irish manager Steve Staunton. For the third place play-off match between Germany and Portugal, the team took over full studio coverage, as well as half-time and full-time analysis, as they had done for the corresponding match of the 2002 World Cup.

=== 2006 Christmas special ===
"Bill O'Herlihy"

A Christmas special was broadcast on RTÉ Two on St. Stephen's Day 2006. This edition featured highlights of Après Match sketches from 2006, including sequences from the previous summer's World Cup. The stars of the show interviewed the real RTÉ analysts including Ray Houghton, RTÉ commentator George Hamilton and Sky Sports' Chris Kamara. TV3 sports broadcaster Trevor Welch was lampooned, including having his vowels drawn out as he was interviewing fans from participating countries such as Costa Rica and Germany. The broadcast also featured extended highlights of the stars covering the third place play-off of the World Cup between Germany and Portugal.

=== Euro 2008 sketches ===
The trio marked their tenth anniversary with three weeks of sketches during UEFA Euro 2008. The tournament marked their biggest contribution yet to RTÉ's coverage of a major tournament. For the first time, Après Match had its own producer, Gráinne O'Carroll, and production team. The real O'Herlihy said that Après Match has played a significant part in what have been impressive viewing figures for a tournament that, in the absence of Ireland and England, he thought might not have generated much interest. He said:

The figures are phenomenal, really. We had nearly 700,000 last Sunday at peak (for Spain vs Italy), the English channel had only about 75,000 at peak that night – they're blowing BBC and ITV out of the water. There's no question that Après Match are part of that, I think they're the best comedy team for a long, long time.

For O'Herlihy keeping his composure proved difficult and he was finally sent over the edge by the Frankly Speaking interview with Fernando Torres, when Frank Stapleton asked the player if it was difficult for him having the hopes of all of Spain resting on his shoulders "seeing as they're quite slopey". The rest of the panel had difficulty keeping their composure too, with the parodies on Andy Gray and Richard Keys of Sky Sports "often rendering a tearful Graeme Souness speechless". The highlights were released on DVD and broadcast as a TV Christmas special the following December.

=== 2010 World Cup sketches ===
The team returned to RTÉ Two with brand new sketches and material for the duration of the 2010 FIFA World Cup. Footballer Andy Reid made a guest appearance in two sketches. Sunderland A.F.C.'s Stadium of Light was used in one sketch. Dietmar Hamann and Osvaldo Ardiles, the newest pundits in RTÉ's World Cup team, also made appearances in the Après Match line up. For the 3rd place play-off match between Germany and Uruguay, the whole show (Preview, half-time and full-time analysis) was Après Match, and was followed by a "special edition" of Après Match in which the real RTÉ panel discussed Après Match.

=== Euro 2012 sketches ===
The team returned for a new round of sketches for the Euro 2012 tournament. They got off to a start with the sketch of the Irish showband Crystal Swing. Nearly all sketches after that featured Bill, Eamonn, John and Liam. During the tournament it featured more "Best of Apres Match" than new material.

=== Euro 2016 sketches ===
The team returned with brand new sketches for Euro 2016. They started off with a sketch that included the match between Ireland and England at Euro '88 when Ray Houghton scored the winning goal. After the Ireland-Sweden match, they returned once again with a sketch that included the football analysts in the RTÉ studio, Liam Brady and Eamon Dunphy, as well as presenter Darragh Maloney. After the Irish victory over Italy, the crew created a satirical sketch which was a parody of the TV3 studio, who are RTÉ's main competitor.

== Other sketches ==
In addition to their football sketches, the trio also parodied the Irish political situation in 1982 when two general elections happened in a programme called Après Match Presents Election '82, which aired on RTÉ One on 24 February 2016. The trio also spoofed classic Ireland soccer matches in a series entitled Après Match of The Day. A second series of Apres Match of The Day began on Monday 6 March 2017 in which the trio introduced their own version of the 1979 All-Ireland Senior Football Championship Final between Dublin and Kerry and the mass that took place during the visit to Ireland made by Pope John Paul II at Ballybrit Racecourse.

=== Other footage ===
There are clips of some classic footage, news, events, weather, programmes and RTE advert breaks since the 1970s featured in it. Every Aprés Match programme will be on YouTube in future in full and clips.

== Video and DVD releases ==
- The Best of Après Match 2000 – VHS, 2000
- Après Match – Live at the Olympia – VHS, 2001
- Après Match – Tired & Emotional – The Best of 2002 – VHS and DVD, 2002
- Après Match – 1994–2004 – VHS and DVD, 2003
- The Best of Après Match 2006 – DVD, 2006
- The Best of Après Match 2008 – DVD, 2008
- The Best of Après Match 2010 – DVD, 2010
- The Last Ever Après Match DVD in the World, Ever. – DVD, 2012

== See also ==
- The State of Us – a similar show starring Risteard Cooper and broadcast before the 2007 Irish general election.
