= 2007 in Irish television =

The following is a list of events relating to television in Ireland from 2007.

== Events ==
=== January ===
- January – RTÉ announces plans to launch a channel with the working title of RTÉ International, designed to offer programmes from RTÉ One, RTÉ Two and TG4.
- 1 January – US comedy drama series Ugly Betty begins on RTÉ Two.
- 10 January – Scottish Media Group and Belfast-based UTV agree the details of a merger, including a revised share split between the two. UTV will own 54% of the group, while SMG will take the remaining 46%. However, the deal is once again rejected at the end of February.

=== April ===
- 1 April – The RTÉ Irish language channel, TG4, becomes a separate entity. Previously it had been operated as a subsidiary of RTÉ under the name Telefís na Gaeilge.
- April – The Broadcasting (Amendment) Act 2007 comes into law. The Act gives Irish national public service broadcasters RTÉ and TG4 digital terrestrial television obligations and also mandates the licensing of multiplexes for carriage on the RTÉ multiplex of Irish free-to-air channels.

=== May ===
- 22 May – 52-year-old Paul Stokes is sentenced to two years imprisonment (one of which is suspended) for criminal damage and reckless endangerment after he drove his car into the front door of a building at RTÉ Television Centre in December 2006.

=== July ===
- July – TG4 is accepted as a new member of the European Broadcasting Union.

=== September ===
- 24 September – TG4 begins airing the long running US animated comedy series South Park with the series being dubbed into an Irish speaking language. It will be shown on Silé with the more adult content being removed.

=== October ===
- October – UTV undergoes a corporate reorganisation which sees the broadcaster's shareholders swap their shares for shares in a new holding company, UTV Media plc, which takes over UTV plc's shareholdings in the new media and radio subsidiaries. UTV Ltd. – the original Ulster Television Limited, now a wholly owned subsidiary of UTV Media – has returned to being solely the operating company for the ITV franchise.

=== Unknown ===
- Undated – TV3 begins broadcasting in widescreen format on UPC.

== Debuts ==
=== RTÉ ===
- 1 January – Ugly Betty on RTÉ Two (2006–2010)
- 26 February – Class of the Titans on RTÉ Two (2005–2008)
- 22 April – The State of Us on RTÉ One (2007)
- 24 May – Soupy Norman on RTÉ Two (2007–2008)
- 21 August – The Secret Show on RTÉ Two (2006–2007)
- Summer – The Trump Card on RTÉ One (2007)
- 3 September – Prosperity on RTÉ Two (2007)
- 8 September – The Once a Week Show on RTÉ Two (2007–2008)

=== TV3 ===
- April – Xposé (2007–2019)
- 4 September – Tonight with Vincent Browne (2007–2017)

=== TG4 ===
- 6 January – Firehouse Tales (2005–2006)
- 7 January – No Béarla (2007)
- 24 March – Coconut Fred's Fruit Salad Island (2005–2006)
- 4 June – Loonatics Unleashed (2005–2007)
- 12 July – Hi Hi Puffy AmiYumi (2004–2006)
- 4 September – Horseland (2006–2008)
- 15 October – Army Wives (2007–2013)
- 3 November – Tar ag Spraoi Sesame

== Changes of network affiliation ==
Shows	Moved from	Moved to
South Park	TV3	TG4

== Ongoing television programmes ==
=== 1960s ===
- RTÉ News: Nine O'Clock (1961–present)
- RTÉ News: Six One (1962–present)
- The Late Late Show (1962–present)

=== 1970s ===
- The Late Late Toy Show (1975–present)
- RTÉ News on Two (1978–2014)
- The Sunday Game (1979–present)

=== 1980s ===
- Dempsey's Den (1986–2010)
- Questions and Answers (1986–2009)
- Fair City (1989–present)
- RTÉ News: One O'Clock (1989–present)

=== 1990s ===
- Would You Believe (1990s–present)
- Winning Streak (1990–present)
- Prime Time (1992–present)
- Nuacht RTÉ (1995–present)
- Nuacht TG4 (1996–present)
- Ros na Rún (1996–present)
- The Premiership/Premier Soccer Saturday (1998–2013)
- Sports Tonight (1998–2009)
- TV3 News (1998–present)
- The View (1999–2011)
- Ireland AM (1999–present)
- Telly Bingo (1999–present)

=== 2000s ===
- Nationwide (2000–present)
- TV3 News at 5.30 (2001–present)
- You're a Star (2002–2008)
- Killinaskully (2003–2008)
- The Clinic (2003–2009)
- The Panel (2003–2011)
- Against the Head (2003–present)
- news2day (2003–present)
- Other Voices (2003–present)
- Tubridy Tonight (2004–2009)
- The Afternoon Show (2004–2010)
- Ryan Confidential (2004–2010)
- Saturday Night with Miriam (2005–present)
- Night Shift (2006–2008)
- Seoige and O'Shea (2006–2009)
- The Podge and Rodge Show (2006–2010)
- Aifric (2006–present)
- Anonymous (2006–present)
- One to One (2006–present)
- The Week in Politics (2006–present)

== Ending this year ==
- 1 January – Celebrity Jigs 'n' Reels (2006–2007)
- 28 January – No Béarla (2007)
- 26 April – Dustin's Daily News (2005–2007)
- 30 April – Naked Camera (2005–2007)
- 13 May – The State of Us (2007)
- July – Auld Ones (2003–2007)
- 24 December – Soupy Norman (2007)
- Undated – Dan & Becs (2006–2007)

== Deaths ==
- 23 July – Joan O'Hara, 76, stage, film and television actress

== See also ==
- 2007 in Ireland
