= Gary Cooke =

Irish actor, satirist and writer

- Occupations: Actor; Comedian; Writer

“ I mean when we did I, Keano! – well that's the sort of subject matter that should be tackled in the Abbey. Seán O'Casey? That's the sort of thing he would have been writing about in his day, because at that time Saipan was the biggest, the most important, thing happening in the country."

— Gary Cooke in a 2009 interview about Macbecks: selection of a quote which was included in the quotes of that year by The Irish Times.

Gary Cooke is an Irish actor, satirist and writer who is one of the stars, on screen, of Après Match and, on stage, I, Keano and MacBecks. He is perhaps best known for his portrayal of media personality Eamon Dunphy, although he has also mocked Match of the Day presenter Gary Lineker and TV3 sports broadcaster Trevor Welch.

Cooke lives in Baldoyle.

== Career ==
From 2005 to 2007 he starred as Dunphia the wood nymph (Eamon Dunphy) and Fergie the Hair Dryer God (Alex Ferguson) in the musical comedy hit I, Keano. On 31 January 2006, Cooke took part in a New Year's Eve special of Celebrity Jigs n' Reels. He plays one of the judges, Vernon Fentor, alongside Sean Gallagher and former EastEnders star Michelle Collins on the ITV/TV3 drama Rock Rivals. Filming of the series took place in Ireland. He co-wrote the script for this year's Gaiety Pantomime, Jack and the Beanstalk.

He co-wrote with Malachy McKenna and starred in the musical MacBecks at the Olympia Theatre. David and Victoria Beckham were invited to the opening night but did not attend. He contributed to a book of essays compiled as part of Tennis Ireland's 100th anniversary in 2008. He co-wrote with Malachy McKenna a political version of Cinderella which was performed at the Gaiety Theatre in January 2009. In 2010, he signed up with gambling company Ladbrokes as "world-famous Italian manager" Gino Stromboli.

In July 2013 he took part in Celebrity MasterChef Ireland and was eliminated in week 1.

== Appearances ==
- Après Match (1996–present)
- I, Keano (2005–2007)
- Rock Rivals (TV3)
- MacBecks
