= Roy Keane incident =

Roy Keane incident may refer to:

- Alf-Inge Haaland incident in the 2001 Manchester derby
- Saipan incident in the build-up to the 2002 World Cup Finals

== See also ==
- Roy Keane
