= WBNW =

WBNW may refer to:

- WBNW (AM), a radio station (1120 AM) licensed to Concord, Massachusetts, United States
- WBNW-FM, a radio station (105.7 FM) licensed to Endicott, New York, United States
- WEZE, a radio station (590 AM) licensed to Boston, Massachusetts, United States, which used the call sign WBNW from 1994 to 1997
