= I, Keano =

- Promotional art for 2015 revival
- Music: Paul Woodfull
- Lyrics: Arthur Mathews; Michael Nugent
- Book: Arthur Mathews; Michael Nugent
- Productions: 2005 Dublin; 2015 Dublin revival

I, Keano is a comedy musical play about footballer Roy Keane leaving the Republic of Ireland national football team before the 2002 FIFA World Cup.

It is written by Arthur Mathews, Michael Nugent and Paul Woodfull, and is presented as a mock-epic melodrama about an ancient Roman legion preparing for war.

In its first two years, it had sales of over half a million tickets, generating €10m ($13m) in ticket sales. In January 2008, it began its fourth year of performances with the addition of Caroline Morahan as Surfia.

== Productions ==
Peter Sheridan, brother of film director Jim Sheridan, directed the first production in 2005. It starred Mario Rosenstock of the Irish radio comedy show Gift Grub, and Risteárd Cooper and Gary Cooke of the Irish television comedy show Après Match.

Controversy arose during the first run when three leading cast members publicly left the show, including ironically Rosenstock, who played Keano, leading to media articles about life imitating art imitating life.

Roy Keane attended the show in Dublin in 2005. Michael Caven directed the second production in 2006, which included a run in Manchester, England. Several sections of the play were rewritten substantially for its UK debut, which came on the heels of Keane's messy departure from Manchester United. Portions that were understandable only to Irish audiences were removed, and the role of "Fergie", a send-up of United manager Alex Ferguson, was more heavily emphasised. Terry Byrne directed the third production in 2007, which ran for 2 months at the Olympia, Dublin, and subsequently toured Ireland for 9 weeks.

I, Keano returned in January 2008 for a limited run with a revival of the 2007 production this was billed as the last chance ever to see the show but after a sellout run at the Olympia it returned for "Extra Time" at the Olympia for two weeks from 19 May 2008, playing its last ever performance on 31 May 2008 to standing ovations.

In 2015, the Olympia revived the show again for a limited 6 week run from 25 March to 2 May.

== Characters ==
The characters, and the real-life figures whom they parody, are:

- Keano, the legion's greatest warrior (Roy Keane, then Ireland and Manchester United footballer)
- Fergie, a hair-dryer god (Alex Ferguson, then manager of Manchester United)
- General Macartacus (Mick McCarthy, then manager of Ireland)
- Quinness, a warrior (Niall Quinn, then Ireland footballer)
- Surfia, washerwoman to the legion (Gillian Quinn, Niall's wife)
- Packie Bonnerus, a warrior (Packie Bonner, then Ireland goalkeeping coach)
- Duffus and Keano the Younger, two child warriors (Ireland footballers Damien Duff, then of Blackburn Rovers; and Robbie Keane, then of Leeds United)
- Ridiculus, head of the legion's Federation (representing the Football Association of Ireland)
- Dunphia, a wood nymph (Eamon Dunphy, Irish commentator and ghost-writer of Roy Keane's autobiography)
- Sanctimonius, Obsequius, Scandalus and Superfluous, a scribes' chorus (representing the different viewpoints of the Irish media).

== Cast ==
The lead role of Keano has been played by Mario Rosenstock and Pat Kinevane in 2005, Denis Foley in 2006, and Jamie Beamish in 2007 and 2008*.

Two cast members have been ever-present: Dessie Gallagher (Macartacus) and Malachy McKenna (Obsequius); as has the musical director David Hayes.

The cast has also included Gary Cooke and David O'Meara (Dunphia, Fergie); Paul McGlinchey, Diarmuid Murtagh and Karl Harpur (Packie Bonnerus); Risteárd Cooper, Conor Delaney and Vincent Moran (Quinness); Tara Flynn, Susannah de Wrixon, Sharon Sexton and Caroline Morahan (Surfia), Gary Cooke, Joe Taylor and Ciaran Bermingham (Ridiculus), Ryan O'Connor and Hugh McDonagh (Duffus) and Colin Middleton and Alan Kavanagh Aaron Howey, and Ben Reilly (Keano the Younger).

The scribes have been played by Joe Taylor and Nicholas Grennell (Sanctimonius); Malachy McKenna (Obsequius); Nicky Elliot, Maclean Burke, David O'Meara and Pat Nolan (Scandalus); and Gemma Crowley, Karl Harpur and Lorna Quinn (Superfluous).

- *(Beamish was diagnosed with cancer in the middle of the 2007 run but continued performing until just before the end of the tour when he had to pull out to begin treatment. Understudy Karl Harpur took over the role. Beamish returned for both 2008 runs).

== Quotes ==
Tagline: He Came. He Saw. He Went Home.

Keano: "Typical! If you fail to plan, then you’re planning to fail."
Packie Bonnerus: "But if you plan to fail, and you do fail, then surely you have succeeded?"
