= The State of Us =

2007 four-part mockumentary

- Created by: Gerard Stembridge; Risteárd Cooper
- Written by: Gerard Stembridge; Risteárd Cooper
- Starring: Risteárd Cooper
- Country of origin: Ireland
- No. of episodes: 4

Original release
- Network: RTÉ One
- Release: 22 April – 13 May 2007

The State of Us is a four-part mockumentary which was broadcast on Irish television channel RTÉ One on Sunday nights at 21:40. It stars Risteárd Cooper, well known in Ireland for his part in the Après Match sketches. It was created and written by Cooper and Gerard Stembridge and focuses on the clash between politicians and the media. It is filmed mostly in and around RTÉ Television Centre in Montrose. The first episode was broadcast on Sunday 22 April 2007.

Each episode focuses on a key Irish issue, with topics covered including the transport crisis, the health service debate and the justice portfolio. It was commissioned for broadcast at the time of the build-up to the 2007 general election.

The show poked fun at well-known media personalities including Late Late Show host Pat Kenny, retired chat-show host Gay Byrne, radio and television personality Gerry Ryan, Nationwide presenter Michael Ryan, sports commentator George Hamilton (who is parodied as a faceless, vertically challenged figure), radio veteran Marian Finucane, Winning Streak and Mooney Goes Wild presenter Derek Mooney, Liveline host Joe Duffy, journalist Fintan O'Toole, Prime Time presenter Miriam O'Callaghan and Newstalk broadcaster George Hook. Politicians featured include Tánaiste Michael McDowell, Labour Party leader Pat Rabbitte, former Labour leader Joan Burton, Fine Gael leader Enda Kenny, Sinn Féin president Gerry Adams, Minister for Transport Martin Cullen, Minister for Defence Willie O'Dea and Taoiseach Bertie Ahern, who never actually appeared in the show but can be heard taunting and insulting other politicians (mainly from his own party) on their mobile phones and in one exchange begging to be accepted for an interview with Pat Kenny. Minister for Health, Mary Harney also made a voice-appearance on radio during the series.

== Episode list ==
=== Episode one ===
Tánaiste and Justice Minister Michael McDowell is driving to the RTÉ studios for a radio interview with Pat Kenny. After enduring a very long and tedious car ride to Donnybrook, during which he reprimands a number of thugs for urinating against a tree whilst a gang war erupts in the background, McDowell eventually lands at his destination only to be on the receiving end of Taoiseach Bertie Ahern's taunts via mobile phone. Alas not a very good impression is left by the RTÉ staff on the Minister's arrival, with Marian Finucane being discovered indoors in a very compromising position with a cigarette whilst some very suspect plants arrive in the studio as Kenny prepares to go on air. Fearing that he has been set up, McDowell flees the building in panic, throwing the morning radio schedule into crisis.

=== Episode two ===
Pat Kenny has a dilemma. He has an important interview with Transport Minister Martin Cullen. Should he choose his motorcycle or his car as his mode of transport to get to work on time? He selects the wrong option and his car becomes trapped in traffic on the M50. When nature calls, Pat must resort to the use of a sterilised surgical bottle to urinate. At RTÉ headquarters, Pat's assistant Tom is busy seeking a replacement to do his morning radio show and, with Gay Byrne turning up to save the day (much to Pat's disapproval), Tom then sets out in search of Pat. Cycling through the ever-increasing volume of traffic, Tom eventually reaches Pat who then tells him to go to his house and bring him his motorcycle. Meanwhile, alongside his bevy of beauties, Minister Cullen arrives at the RTÉ studios as Taoiseach Bertie Ahern learns for the first time that he is giving a radio interview. In an attempt to save face for the government, Willie O'Dea is sent in on an undercover operation to smuggle Minister Cullen out of RTÉ.

=== Episode three ===
A bout of food poisoning puts most of the RTÉ radio staff out of action. Tom is under immense strain trying to find replacements for morning radio with Derek Mooney covering for Pat Kenny on Radio 1 and television presenter Michael Ryan the only staff member available to step in for Gerry Ryan over on 2fm. With Ireland's health service in crisis, an ambulance is nowhere to be found so the trolleys begin to pile up at RTÉ headquarters. Miriam O'Callaghan attempts to cheer up the stricken patients but her efforts only serve to worsen the situation. Things go from bad to worse when Labour Party leader Pat Rabbitte, who is due for an interview, learns that Derek Mooney is doing Pat Kenny's show whilst on air, Mooney mistakes Finance Minister Brian Cowen for Health Minister Mary Harney at what she does best – moaning. With Rabbitte having abandoned the interview, Tom must find a replacement with only Joan Burton available to fill in his shoes. George Hook is found in a stairwell and offers to help out, but Tom refuses. When he learns that the crisis was triggered by the sausages in the RTÉ canteen, George plies Joe Duffy with sausage rolls thus adding him to the list of casualties. With Liveline on a commercial break, Tom has no choice but to allow George to take over the show. It is then decided that Radio 1 and 2fm should run a simultaneous broadcast to ease the pressures of finding new presenters. Finally, an ambulance arrives but a row erupts over who should be the first to go to hospital with Pat Kenny claiming that, as the highest paid broadcaster, he should be allowed to leave immediately. Gerry Ryan and Joe Duffy are non-too pleased and, as all this is going on, the ambulance drives off with Burton inside, moaning about the pains in her legs from standing around in the confusion.

=== Episode four ===
Fine Gael leader Enda Kenny appears at his back door in his boxers and invites viewers for a look around his house; including a (now fully dressed) encounter with his karaoke machine. He then sets off on his bicycle for an interview at RTÉ. Alas his attempts to get there unscathed come undone when his bike receives a puncture and he has to resort to queueing for a bus like the common person. When the bus arrives, he realises he has no money but after asking for some spare cash from an innocent bystander, he turns around to find the bus has pulled off again. In the RTÉ carpark, Pat Kenny sits in his car, casting his eyes over his fellow broadcasters and enviously longing to join them in their casual conversation. When he finally plucks up the courage to approach Marian Finucane and Joe Duffy, the latter is overheard insulting him and Pat heads back to his car. With Pat due on air in ten minutes, Tom decides to join him in the passenger seat but he must first overcome the clutches of George Hook, who once again attempts to lure him to Newstalk. Pat asks Tom what the world really thinks of him, believing that his assistant is the only person in the world who is loyal to him. Tom attempts to avoid the question, distracting Pat by (wrongly) telling him that Enda Kenny has just arrived. Eventually Tom opts to tell Pat, albeit with much hesitation, that he is "absolutely unbelievable". At that moment Enda Kenny finally arrives at the studio, still in his biker gear and collapses with exhaustion on the steps having raced through Dublin to make the interview on schedule. Kenny and Kenny square off on air and, with Pat faced with an adversary so similar in perceived personality, popularity and name he is even more unable to cope with his feelings of unworthiness than usual. Pat breaks down live on air, mistaking Enda's rival, Taoiseach Bertie Ahern, for his own rival, Liveline presenter Joe Duffy. This prompts Enda to join him in his moment of unrelenting emotion. The next morning Tom arrives at Pat's house. Pat assumes he has come with his P45 or details of who is to take over the mantle of the station's highest earning broadcaster. However Tom merely points to two giant sacks of complimentary mail he has carried on his bike from RTÉ headquarters. One of them even wants to sleep with the presenter, who quickly places the letter in the left front pocket of his dressing gown. Pat is astounded to discover he is all over the news and that celebrities such as 1992 Eurovision Song Contest winner Linda Martin, music mogul Louis Walsh and Boyzone lead singer Ronan Keating are talking about him. He hurries indoors to switch on his television. There he finds that figures from the worlds of sport and politics including Ireland national team manager Steve Staunton, Ireland rugby manager Eddie O'Sullivan and Sinn Féin President Gerry Adams are lining up in their droves to pay tribute to him. He is intrigued to find Fintan O'Toole has also spoken greatly of him but becomes irritated when he finds that Steve Staunton seems to have taken over the airwaves, typically reiterating how Pat has done a great job, how he works for the team, has delivered a great result and what else can you say. Meanwhile, Bertie Ahern repeatedly rings Tom's mobile to request an interview with Pat, but on each occasion Tom tells him to ring back later. Pat and Tom stroll into RTÉ, where George Hook is astounded to hear of Pat's newfound popularity. He is adamant that Tom will soon join him at Newstalk but Tom shows his unswaying loyalty by declaring he will go only where Pat goes. On Friday night George slips into RTÉ and just as an episode of The Late Late Show is coming to a close, approaches Pat's dressing room. George is inadvertently knocked to the floor by a stray microphone where he lies moaning until Pat emerges from the dressing room. Pat steps over George and leaves RTÉ with Tom, telling his assistant that he should not allow anyone to undermine him before demanding that he open the door.
