= Ron Della Chiesa =

American radio personality

Ron Della Chiesa is a Boston area radio personality. Born in 1938 in Quincy, Massachusetts, he was taken by his father to jazz and Boston Symphony Orchestra concerts in the early 1950s, and developed an ear for both genres. His commentaries, originally on WGBH radio and now WCRB for the Boston Symphony are broadcast on Saturday evenings. These broadcasts as well as his commentary at the Sunday Tanglewood Festival in the summertime are informed by his lifelong attendance of the orchestra, dating back to conductors Charles Münch and Erich Leinsdorf.

His mother, an educator in the South Shore, gave him a love of learning, a curiosity for many cultures, and until her recent passing, a tie to the last Golden Age of Opera. Della Chiesa enlisted in the Army, and became a trumpeter in the Army band. He was an announcer for WBCN in the 1960s and WGBH radio in the mid-1970s.

His first job after graduating from the Boston University College of Communication in 1959 was at WBOS.

From the mid-1970s into the early 1980s Della Chiesa was host of Music America, an afternoon program on WGBH which featured the broad range of American jazz and musical theater. He has presented many visiting Broadway and jazz performers, with a special Friday afternoon program of opera. He was also host for the Boston Symphony Friday performances. In 1986, Ron married a chef by the name of Joyce. Ron was 48 and Joyce was 41. He and his wife, Joyce Della Chiesa, now live in Dorchester, Massachusetts, in a 10-room Victorian style house. In 1995 he was awarded the Courage of Conscience award for being a steward of intergenerational music that binds society and elevates cultural integrity.

With the death of Robert J. Lurtsema in 2000, he became the host of Classical Morning, but retained his Friday afternoon Boston Symphony spot. He continues to announce a Friday evening jazz program, where his close friends will drop in when they are performing in Boston. Until May 2025, he was also heard on WPLM-FM on a Sunday night program highlighting Frank Sinatra, when the radio station dropped him from their Sunday night lineup.

Della Chiesa has been the host of Cooking Around Town on WGBH-TV. In that capacity, he has visited many of the famous and esoteric eateries and bistros in the Boston area, watching the owner/chefs turn their recipes into delicious dishes. Della Chiesa also is in demand as a narrator for New England orchestras and social functions. He occasionally hosts learning tours and lectures for opera, both on land, and on cruise ships; most notably, the Queen Mary 2.
