= Saipan incident =

2002 scandal in Irish football

- Date: May 2002
- Location: Saipan, Northern Mariana Islands
- Type: Industrial relations
- Cause: Disagreement regarding FAI policy
- Participants: Roy Keane, Mick McCarthy, Bertie Ahern
- Outcome: Dismissal of Roy Keane
- Inquiries: FAI Genesis Report
- Litigation: None

The Saipan incident was a public quarrel in May 2002 between Republic of Ireland national football team's captain, Roy Keane, and manager, Mick McCarthy, when the team was preparing in Saipan for its matches in Japan in the 2002 FIFA World Cup. It resulted in Keane, a key player for the national team, being removed from the squad. The incident divided public opinion in Ireland regarding who was to blame.

== Background ==
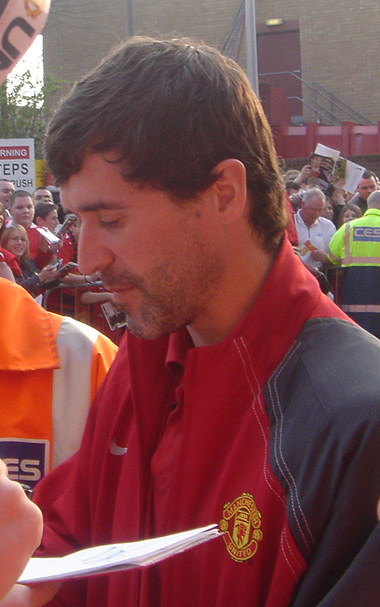
Roy Keane signing autographs in 2005

Keane was the captain of the Irish national team. Since his senior debut under Jack Charlton and then-captain McCarthy, Keane had perceived problems with the preparations of the Irish side. He regarded the Football Association of Ireland (FAI)'s preparations as unprofessional and challenged both Charlton and McCarthy in a number of notable incidents.

Among Keane's issues with Irish management were the conditions of the camp, travel arrangements (which seated the players in business class seats on flights, while FAI officials sat in first class), strategy, expectations, diet, and McCarthy's competence as manager. In his autobiography, Keane said that before a World Cup qualifier away versus the Netherlands, the Irish players were eating cheese sandwiches because the more suitable pre-match meal of pasta was not available.

The island of Saipan was selected by an FAI delegation as an initial base. From management's perspective the time was considered a period of relative rest and recreation, at the end of a club season, and a precursor to moving to Japan to prepare for the tournament. Keane, on the other hand, who is reputed to have told Alex Ferguson that he was going to the World Cup "to win it", viewed it as a period of preparation for the World Cup finals. He therefore became dissatisfied when facilities and general preparation did not match his expectations. On 22 May, Keane decided he was going home but subsequently changed his mind and stayed.

== Events ==
Irish broadcaster RTÉ became aware of the developing row, as did several Irish newspapers. Because of its isolated location, there were certain stories circulating about the incidents, which were all critical of Keane. The Daily Star newspaper had been a harsh critic of Keane for months in the run up to the competition. This included making persistent allegations about Keane's commitment to the Irish team.

Keane had originally agreed to give an interview to sports journalist Paul Kimmage of the Sunday Independent. Kimmage then agreed to let Tom Humphries of The Irish Times join the interview, but made him promise not to print the article until after Kimmage's column on Sunday. Humphries reneged on the deal, stealing a major scoop for The Irish Times. In the article, Humphries listed the events and concerns which had led Keane to decide to leave the team. This article included details and references to the FAI's preparations for the Irish team. This indirectly implied that the event was organized as a junket for FAI officialdom. The article was seen as a direct affront to the authority of the Irish manager and the competence of the FAI.

The Irish Times article increased tensions greatly. McCarthy decided to question Keane about the article. In a team meeting McCarthy held up a copy of the article and asked "What's this all about?", and an argument started. McCarthy then accused Keane of faking injury when Ireland were playing Iran in the second leg of the play off. Keane then unleashed a stinging verbal tirade against McCarthy: "Mick, you're a liar … you're a fucking wanker. I didn't rate you as a player, I don't rate you as a manager, and I don't rate you as a person. You're a fucking wanker and you can stick your World Cup up your arse. The only reason I have any dealings with you is that somehow you are the manager of my country! You can stick it up your bollocks." Mick McCarthy then held a press conference announcing that he had sent Keane home.

Niall Quinn observed in his autobiography that "Roy Keane's 10-minute oration [against Mick McCarthy] ... was clinical, fierce, earth-shattering to the person on the end of it and it ultimately caused a huge controversy in Irish society." But at the same time, he was also critical of Keane's stance, saying that "[Keane] left us in Saipan, not the other way round. And he punished himself more than any of us by not coming back."

None of his team-mates voiced support for Keane during the meeting, though some later expressed their support to him privately. Keane mentioned in his autobiography that Gary Breen and David Connolly visited his room. Senior players Steve Staunton and Niall Quinn seemed to take the side of McCarthy, and the FAI, in the argument that followed. Staunton was the most loyal to the FAI line of the argument. He was later given the captaincy in Keane's absence.

=== Aftermath ===
Despite the efforts of the media and Taoiseach Bertie Ahern, Keane and McCarthy failed to resolve the conflict and Keane missed the World Cup. Keane gave an interview concerning the controversy to RTÉ and when asked if it was possible to go back he did not deny that he might. The Irish football team were defeated in a penalty shoot-out by Spain in the second round on 16 June.

The FAI commissioned a report from external consultants Genesis, into its World Cup preparations. The "Genesis Report" agreed with many of Keane's criticisms, finding that the FAI structure was not conducive to good planning and making a range of recommendations. The complete report was not published for legal reasons. Brendan Menton resigned as FAI General Secretary at this time, and the media linked the two events, though Menton denied this.

== Legacy ==
Roy Keane stated that he would not play again for Ireland under McCarthy, and in his autobiography even said that his former national team coach could "rot in hell". McCarthy continued as national team manager and Ireland then played Russia in a qualifying match for the European Championship. Ireland lost to a badly resourced Russian team 4–2, who had played badly in the World Cup. Ireland then lost the home leg 2–1 at Lansdowne Road. In the face of rebellion on the terraces, a decrease in support for the national team, and consequent declining attendance revenues, the FAI decided to ask McCarthy to resign on 5 November 2002.

The appointment of Brian Kerr as team manager in 2003 led to Keane's return to international football on 27 May 2004, in a friendly match against Romania at Lansdowne Road. He played his final international game the following year, having been capped 67 times for the nation since 1991. He retired from playing at club level in 2006. Ireland failed to qualify for any major tournament until 2011, when after beating Estonia they qualified for the 2012 European Championship.

By November 2006, Keane appeared to have reconciled with McCarthy when the two men settled their differences via a phone call ahead of a match between McCarthy's Wolverhampton Wanderers and Keane's Sunderland. The handshake between the two men received considerable media attention. In April 2007, the managers again met in another match, and Keane praised McCarthy for his work in Sunderland previous to Keane's tenure there. In December 2013, Keane, speaking in an ITV4 documentary, admitted his regret at missing out on the 2002 World Cup, when asked what the largest regret of his playing career was, saying "To play in the World Cup. It would have been nice to play, a lot of people were disappointed, particularly my family." He further stated that he "should have put his personal issues with McCarthy to one side for the sake of the country."

=== Popular culture ===
The incident was so divisive that it was dubbed a "civil war [in the Pacific]" by Irish media. The Irish Times later wrote that "[m]ost people have ... a story of a split between families, between friends, between work colleagues." In 2005, a musical comedy play parodying the incident and its key players, I, Keano, opened in Dublin. The play, written by Arthur Mathews, Michael Nugent, and Paul Woodfull, represented the incident as a mock-epic melodrama about a Roman legion preparing for war. Keane attended a performance of the show, which ran in Dublin until May 2008.

Keane's Labrador Retriever Triggs came to international media attention as Keane would go on long, highly publicized walks with her in Cheshire after his return from Saipan. Triggs became a minor celebrity in tabloids and part of Keane's public image until her death in 2012. This led The Daily Telegraph's Steve Wilson to call Triggs "the most famous dog in football since Pickles".

In an echo of the incident, three main cast members, including Mario Rosenstock, who portrayed "Keano" (the play's version of Roy Keane), left the show early in its first run, leading to media articles about life imitating art imitating life.

In September 2025, a film about the incident, Saipan, premiered at the Toronto International Film Festival, starring Éanna Hardwicke as Roy Keane and Steve Coogan as Mick McCarthy. The film was favourably reviewed by The Guardian and described as "the rare football movie that's worth a replay."
