= Rory Kinsella =

Wexford hurler and manager

Personal information
- Native name: Ruairí Cinsealach (Irish)
- Born: 1954 (age 71–72) Gorey, County Wexford, Ireland
- Occupation: Secondary school teacher

Sport
- Sport: Hurling
- Position: Left wing-forward
Club
- Years: Club
- Naomh Éanna
Club titles
- Wexford titles: 0
Inter-county*
Years	County	Apps (scores)
1974–1979	Wexford	? (1–4)
Inter-county titles
- Leinster titles: 0
- All-Irelands: 0
- NHL: 0
- All Stars: 0
- *Inter County team apps and scores correct as of 15:34, 23 June 2016.

Rory Kinsella (born 1954) is an Irish former hurling manager and player who played as a right wing-forward at senior level for the Wexford county team. He managed the Wexford senior team from 1996 until 1999.

A schoolteacher he trained at Thomond National College of Physical Education in Limerick, and though in St. Aidans, C.B.S., Whitehall, Dublin and in Bunclody, County Wexford.

== Honours ==
=== Player ===
Wexford

- Leinster Under-21 Hurling Championship (1): 1973

=== Selector/Manager ===
Bunclody FCJ

- All-Ireland Colleges Senior B Football Championship (1): 1986

Wexford

- All-Ireland Senior Hurling Championship (1): 1996
- Leinster Senior Hurling Championship (2): 1996, 1997

Sporting positions
Preceded by Liam Griffin	Wexford Senior Hurling Manager; 1996–1999	Succeeded by Joachim Kelly
