= Home of the Year =

Irish reality television series

- Genre: Reality competition
- Created by: Nordisk Film; Banijay
- Judges: Hugh Wallace; Helen James; Declan O'Donnell; Deirdre Whelan; Patrick Bradley; Peter Crowley; Suzie McAdam; Sara Cosgrove; Amanda Bone; Siobhan Lam
- Voices of: David Heffernan
- Country of origin: Ireland
- Original language: English
- No. of series: 12 (as of 2026)

Production
- Running time: 30 minutes (inc. adverts)
- Production company: ShinAwiL

Original release
- Network: RTÉ One
- Release: 26 March 2015 – present

Related
- Celebrity Home of the Year; Scotland's Home of the Year

Home of the Year is an Irish property reality television series which has been broadcast on RTÉ One since 2015. The programme is based on the format of the Norwegian series Årets Hjem, originally created by Nordisk Film TV Denmark and distributed by Banijay.

== Format ==
The format of the series follows three judges visiting three different homes every week and each scoring them out of ten. At the end of each episode the house which has scored the most points advances to the final. After seven weeks, the seven winning houses are judged one last time with the overall winner announced at the end of the episode.

== Judges ==
Architect Hugh Wallace is the only judge who has appeared in every single season of the show. Season one saw Wallace joined by architect Declan O'Donnell and textiles and homeware designer Helen James. Season two and three saw Wallace and O'Donnell return for a second and third year in a row. Interior designer Deirdre Whelan replaced James as a judge. Season four saw Wallace and Whelan return for another series, O'Donnell left the show and was replaced by architect Patrick Bradley. Season five and six had Wallace and Whelan judge once again, however, architect Peter Crowley joined the panel. In season seven Wallace was the only judge to return. He was joined by interior designer Suzie McAdam and architect Amanda Bone.

In 2022, Wallace and Bone returned for their eighth and second series, respectively, joined by a new judge, interior designer Sara Cosgrove. All three judges returned for another series the following year. In 2025, Cosgrove was replaced by interior consultant, Siobhan Lam. Season 12, broadcast in 2026 included the same three presenters, filming having been completed before Wallace's death in December 2025.

	1	2	3	4	5	6	7	8	9	10	11	12
Hugh Wallace												
Amanda Bone	—N/a											
Siobhan Lam	—N/a											
Sara Cosgrove	—N/a										—N/a	
Suzie McAdam	—N/a							—N/a				
Deirdre Whelan	—N/a						—N/a					
Peter Crowley	—N/a						—N/a					
Patrick Bradley	—N/a				—N/a							
Declan O'Donnell				—N/a								
Helen James		—N/a										

== Series overview ==
Season	Premiere date	Finale date	Number of houses	Number of weeks	Winners
1	26 March 2015	14 May 2015	21	8	Andrew Harvey & Ita Molloy, Co. Cork
2	3 March 2016	28 April 2016	21	8	Egon Walesch & Richard Goodwin, Co. Westmeath
3	2 March 2017	27 April 2017	20	8	Louise McGuane & Dominic McCarthy, Co. Clare
4	27 February 2018	24 April 2018	21	8	Patrick & Ros Walshe, Co. Wicklow
5	19 February 2019	9 April 2019	21	8	Peter Boyle & Ciara Denvir, Co. Antrim
6	25 February 2020	14 April 2020	21	8	Ethna Dorman, Co. Dublin
7	16 February 2021	6 April 2021	21	8	Jen Sheahan, Co. Dublin
8	15 February 2022	5 April 2022	21	8	Kate & Shane Byrne, Co. Wicklow
9	14 February 2023	4 April 2023	21	8	Rob & Janice McConnell, Co. Antrim
10	20 February 2024	9 April 2024	21	8	Shane Murray and Marty Campbell, Co. Dublin
11	18 February 2025	8 April 2025	21	8	Amy & Eoin Martin, Co. Limerick
12	3 March 2026	21 April 2026	21	8	Lorcan Burke & Adrian Sharp, Co. Kildare

== Celebrity Home of the Year ==
Since 2016 three one-off celebrity specials of the show have aired on RTÉ One with five celebrities taking part in each episode. As with the main series, each house was scored out of thirty. The homeowner with the highest score at the end of the episode was awarded €5,000 for a charity of their choice.

=== 2016 ===
The episode was broadcast on 28 December 2016.

Judges scores in the charts below (given in parentheses) are listed in this order from left to right: Hugh Wallace, Deirdre Whelan, Declan O'Donnell.

Homeowner	Score	Result
Terry Prone	25 (7, 9, 9)	=3rd place
Helen Cody	26 (8, 10, 8)	2nd place
Darren Kennedy	25 (8, 8, 9)	=3rd place
Norah Casey	27 (9, 9, 9)	Winner
Brent Pope	23 (8, 7, 8)	5th place

=== 2018 ===
The episode was broadcast on 2 January 2018.

Judges scores in the charts below (given in parentheses) are listed in this order from left to right: Hugh Wallace, Deirdre Whelan, Patrick Bradley.

Homeowner	Score	Result
Melissa Hill	24 (8, 8, 8)	3rd place
David Norris	27 (9, 9, 9)	Winner
Eoghan McDermott	22 (8, 7, 7)	=4th place
Mike Ross	22 (7, 8, 7)	=4th place
Lorraine Keane	25 (8, 9, 8)	2nd place

=== 2019 ===
The episode was broadcast on 2 January 2019.

Judges scores in the charts below (given in parentheses) are listed in this order from left to right: Hugh Wallace, Deirdre Whelan, Peter Crowley.

Homeowner	Score	Result
Robert Ballagh	26 (8, 9, 9)	2nd place
Eleanor McEvoy	22 (7, 8, 7)	5th place
John Boyne	27 (10, 9, 8)	Winner
Jean Byrne	25 (8, 9, 8)	=3rd place
Ramona Nicholas	25 (10, 8, 7)	=3rd place
