= Ciara Kelly =

Irish radio presenter

- Born: Ciara Angela Kelly; 26 April 1971 (age 54); Ireland
- Other names: Dr Ciara Kelly
- Education: Commerce and Medicine
- Alma mater: University College Dublin
- Occupation: Broadcaster
- Agent(s): Noel Kelly (2014–2023)
- Height: 5.7 ft (174 cm)
- Spouse: Eoin
- Children: Four

Ciara Kelly is an Irish radio presenter, columnist and former GP. She presents the morning show on Newstalk. She also has a weekly column with the Sunday Independent.

== Career ==
Kelly qualified from University College Dublin as a medical doctor in 1997, having previously completed a Bachelor of Commerce. She went into practice and also did media work, including breakfast television on TV3 and presenting Doctors on Call on RTÉ.

She was the medical expert on Operation Transformation, a television series on RTÉ, which won an IFTA in 2014, and also on George Hook's lunchtime radio show on Newstalk.

In October 2017, she withdrew from active medical practice to concentrate on her media career. The same month she claimed that an "Irish Harvey Weinstein" was operating within the Irish media.

Kelly describes herself as a soi-disant "intellectual". She is the instigator of the public health initiative "100 Days of Walking". In November 2019, Vicky Phelan blasted Kelly over her writing about people affected by the CervicalCheck cancer scandal who sued.

On 18 March 2020, Kelly announced that she had tested positive for COVID-19 the previous day. She discussed her diagnosis on Liveline, and Miriam O'Callaghan interviewed her for Prime Time through Skype from her home. Though no longer practising in medicine, Kelly said she had taken precautions and had not been abroad. She had continued to present the Monday and Tuesday editions of her programme, Lunchtime Live, from the hot press (a type of Irish cupboard or closet) in her home, and Mick Heaney of The Irish Times described her Wednesday programme as "a compelling show, remarkably so considering it was hosted by an ill woman sitting in an airing cupboard". Her performance while ill contributed to her winning an IMRO award.

From August 2020 she moved to co-presenting Newstalk's morning show.

Kelly was a long-time client of Noel Kelly, of NK Management, until it emerged that he had been funneling secret payments to Ryan Tubridy. She left Noel Kelly and NK Management in 2023 following the emergence of Kelly's involvement in the secret payments to Ryan Tubridy, announcing that she had been with him since 2014.

== Personal life ==
She lives in Greystones, County Wicklow. She is an atheist.
