= Redneck Nation =

2002 book by Michael Graham

- Author: Michael Graham
- Publisher: Warner Books
- Publication date: 2002
- ISBN: 0-446-52884-6

Redneck Nation: How the South Really Won the War (ISBN 0-446-52884-6) is a book by conservative personality Michael Graham. Released in 2002 by Warner Books, the book covers a wide variety of Graham's personal opinions on current and historical events in the context of southern ideas and a "redneck" political point of view.

His views on race and social politics within this framework have become a source of contention amongst supporters and critics alike. His invoking of H. L. Mencken in a quote to begin each chapter is often discussed due to Mencken's sometimes-controversial writings on race and elitism. However, National Review online (where Graham is a frequent contributor), in their review of the book, noted that Graham's "Menckenesque scorn for boobery happily knows no geographical bounds,".
