= The Right Hook =

Irish, current affairs radio show hosted by George Hook

The Right Hook was a late afternoon to early evening talk programme broadcast on the Dublin, Ireland-based national Newstalk commercial radio station, and hosted by George Hook.

It was the first radio show in Ireland to broadcast the show entirely live via web cam on the internet.

== Schedule ==
Monday - Friday 16.30 - 19.00

== Features ==
As well as featuring news and current affairs interviews and analysis, a number of regular segments featured including technology with Jessica Kelly and Jonathan McCrae, travel with Fionn Davenport, movies with Philip Molloy and sport, which featured regular contributions from well-known Irish sport pundits such as Johnny Giles, Liam Griffin and Jim Glennon. On Mondays at 5.30, the outspoken right-wing talk show host Michael Graham linked up live from Boston. Every Friday George was joined by Newstalk's political editor Shane Coleman and sports commentator Dave McIntyre for the duration of the show.

== History ==
The Right Hook was presented from the start of Newstalk in 2002 by the same presenter until his retirement.

Garrett Harte was the original producer, and is credited by Hook on his autobiography Time Added On with moulding him into the presenter he is today. Harte was later appointed Newstalk's station editor and the show was subsequently produced by Mark Simpson.

The show was well known for Hook's opinionated style of broadcasting and regularly traveled around Ireland for on-location broadcasts. Throughout the course of the 2008 US Presidential Election Campaign, Hook broadcast from key locations in the United States such as New York for Super Tuesday, Denver for the 2008 Democratic National Convention and Washington D.C. for both the 2008 election and the inauguration of Barack Obama as 44th President of the United States in January 2009.

The show is well known for interviewing the famous American celebrity Tom Cruise while he was doing a press junket in Europe for Mission Impossible - Ghost Protocol.

During campaigning ahead of the 2011 Irish presidential election, Fine Gael candidate Gay Mitchell made a joke about suicide on while appearing on The Right Hook. He promised to "jump off O'Connell Bridge" if he was asked to smile. Founding Secretary of the Irish Association of Suicidology Dr John Connolly described Mitchell's comment as "unfortunate".
