= Paul Woodfull =

Irish writer, actor, comedian and musician (born 1957)

Paul Woodfull (born 1957 in Dublin) is an Irish writer, actor, comedian and musician. He has written two television series, a CD and the comedy musical play I, Keano. He is a graduate of the National College of Art and Design in Dublin.

== Performing career ==
Woodfull was a member of the Skank Mooks in the late 1970s, the band was one of the original and most influential of the Dublin punk/new wave bands of the era. He also created, and performed in, various musical tribute groups, including the Joshua Trio, the Glam Tarts and Abbaesque. The Joshua Trio was a spoof U2 tribute act which featured on The Last Resort with Jonathan Ross, with Woodfull as Paul Wonderful, a messianic singer with a religious devotion to Bono. The others in the trio were Woodfull's brother Kieran and Arthur Mathews.

Woodfull's other performance alter egos include DJ Gary on RTÉ 2fm (1998–2006); lounge singer Tony St James; and republican balladeer Ding Dong Denny O’Reilly. In 2000, he appeared as Ding Dong Denny O'Reilly in the movie When Brendan Met Trudy. He also played the Tommy McAnairey character in television advertisements for Gas Networks Ireland warning about the dangers of carbon monoxide poisoning.

== Theatre ==
Woodfull, with Arthur Mathews and Michael Nugent, co-wrote I, Keano, a comedy musical play about the Saipan incident in which footballer Roy Keane was cut from the Republic of Ireland team before the 2002 World Cup. It is presented as a mock-epic melodrama about an ancient Roman legion preparing for war. In its first two years, over half a million people watched it, generating €10m ($13m) in ticket sales. In January 2008, it began its fourth year of performances.

== Television ==
Stew is an Irish comedy sketch series. Woodfull and Paul Tylak wrote and performed in it. It won Best Entertainment Series at the Irish Film and Television Awards in 2005 and at the Celtic Film & Television Festival in 2006.

This Is Ireland was a comedy sketch series about Ireland made for the BBC.

Paul also written and acted in sketches in Irish Pictorial Weekly as well as in Val Falvey TD on RTÉ.

Paul played Father Harry Coyle in Father Ted ("Competition Time"), who impersonated Ziggy Stardust.

== Writing ==
- Publocked, CD as Ding Dong Denny O’Reilly, 1996
- Ding Dong Merrily on High, televised concert as Ding Dong Denny O'Reilly, RTÉ, 2004
- This is Ireland, TV series with Arthur Mathews and Paul Tylak, BBC, 2004
- Stew, TV series with Paul Tylak, RTÉ, 2004–2005
- I, Keano, comedy musical play with and Michael Nugent, 2005
