= WPLM-FM =

- Plymouth, Massachusetts; United States
- Broadcast area: South of Boston
- Frequency: 99.1 MHz
- Branding: Easy 99.1

Programming
- Language: English
- Format: Soft adult contemporary

Ownership
- Owner: Plymouth Rock Broadcasting Company
- Sister stations: WPLM

History
- First air date: June 25, 1961
- Call sign meaning: Plymouth

Technical information
- Licensing authority: FCC
- Facility ID: 52838
- Class: B
- ERP: 50,000 watts
- HAAT: 131 meters (430 ft)
- Transmitter coordinates: 41°58′2.3″N 70°42′2.1″W

Links
- Public license information: Public file; LMS
- Webcast: Listen live
- Website: easy991.com

WPLM-FM (99.1 FM, "Easy 99.1") is a soft adult contemporary music station licensed to Plymouth, Massachusetts. It is owned by Plymouth Rock Broadcasting Co.. Its transmitter is located in Plymouth. With a 50,000 watt signal, WPLM-FM can be received in Boston, Cape Cod, the South Coast region, Providence, Rhode Island, and the South Shore.

== History ==
WPLM-FM signed on June 25, 1961. In the station's first decades on the air, it had a big band format. This was abandoned in February 1994 in favor of an adult contemporary format, branded "Variety 99.1". However, the station saw little success with this format, due to there being several other stations with a similar format within WPLM-FM's coverage area, and as a result it switched to smooth jazz on June 25, 1995. Initially, programming was largely provided by SW Networks' Smooth FM service, with WPLM-FM itself branding as "Smooth FM 99.1". After Smooth FM closed on December 31, 1996, the station switched to a similar service from Jones Radio Networks and reimaged as "Jazzy 99.1". Two years later, the smooth jazz format was discontinued in favor of "Easy 99.1", which initially featured a blend of adult standards and soft adult contemporary.

From WPLM-FM's inception, its programming has been simulcast, in whole or in part, with WPLM (1390 AM), which signed on six years earlier; from 1997 to 2015, the AM station broke away on weekdays to carry business news and talk programming from WADN/WBNW (1120).

In April 2020, the station temporarily suspended its live streaming due to financial problems stemming from the pandemic. The stream was restored later in the year.

WPLM-FM has also taken over WXKS-FM's decades-old tradition of playing Rose Royce's 1977 single "Wishing On A Star" every Saturday at 12 noon.

Notable past and present personnel include Sean Casey, Tom Stewart, Audrey Constant, Scott Reiniche, Hutch, Kevin Cronin, Billy Teed, Chris Rogers, Ken Coleman, Ron Della Chiesa, Bill O'Connell, and Barry Scott of The Lost 45s.
