= Hugh Wallace (architect) =

Irish architect (1956–2025)

Hugh Wallace (December 1956 – 1 December 2025) was an Irish architect and television presenter.

== Early years and education ==
Wallace was born in south Dublin in 1956, the single child of Sue and Ken, brought up in "a bubble of Protestantism"; the birth date is reported variously as 9 December or 12 December. He was baptised at St Patrick's Cathedral, Dublin. He noted "I was a Protestant. So I was in a very cocooned world back 40 or 50 years ago. I didn’t meet a Catholic until I went to secondary school at 12. I lived in this world where I went to Protestant school and I played in the Protestant scouts and my friends were Protestants and my parents’ friends were Protestants. So I was cocooned away.” He attended Sandford Park School, where he struggled academically, until it was recognised that he was dyslexic. He noted "I was driven by being tagged the idiot in school because of my dyslexia. Once that was recognised (he credits his English teacher Gregg Collins), it allowed me to park my ‘stupidity’... I was the kid who was going to be a low achiever." He had always loved drawing and had wanted to be an architect since he was a child, inspired by his uncle, who was in the field. Wallace studied professionally at the Bolton Street School of Architecture, now part of Technological University Dublin. When he finished his studies, in the early 1980s, Dublin was struggling economically, with high unemployment and depressed markets. Unable to find work as an architect, he set up for some years as an interior designer, with a passion for strong colour.

== Career ==
Together with fellow student Alan Douglas, Wallace founded the Dublin-based practice Douglas Wallace Architects in 1982. He worked on hotels, retail spaces and homes around Ireland, including the interior of a new Dublin site for the department store Brown Thomas. Douglas Wallace opened branch offices in Belfast and London. In the wake of the financial crisis of 2008, the firm collapsed and went into liquidation in 2009, but a new Douglas Wallace Associates arose and became highly successful, leading projects in Europe and the Middle East.

Wallace presented property television programmes such as The Great House Revival and Home of the Year beginning in 2015.

== Personal life and death ==
Wallace married Martin Corbett, a hairdresser. They met in 1988, became civil partners in 2012, and remained together until Wallace's death.

Wallace spoke candidly about his struggles with alcoholism from his teenage years. He said he had been given "a second chance at life". Having a history of depression, he commented that he started drinking again after he lost his business following the 2008 financial crash and had another "relapse during the first [Covid] lockdown after eight years sober", having felt overwhelmed at times by the pandemic. He notes “I was drinking 120 units a week. I was drinking a vast quantity of alcohol." He spent a year in rehab in order to recover. He was an advocate for others in their battles with addiction, commenting "there’s not a family in the country unaffected by alcohol". “The whole world in Ireland revolves around alcohol". He commented “My father was an alcoholic. He drank because his father before him drank. It is a gene in the family.” His father had gone into rehab for six months to recover. Wallace's husband, Corbett, also struggled with drinking. Wallace publicly discussed the multiple nature of his challenges - being gay, dyslexic, depressive and an alcoholic in Ireland. He never was tee total.

Wallace was an atheist. He loved to travel and fly to exotic locations, enjoying the great contrasts to the home town of his childhood.

Wallace died suddenly on 1 December 2025, at the age of 68. His funeral was held at St Patrick's cathedral, Dublin.
