= St Aidan's C.B.S. =

- Scoil Aodháin

Location
- Collins Ave., Dublin 9 Ireland
- 53.384376°N 6.251935°W

Information
- Motto: Pax et Spes (Latin for 'Peace and Hope’)
- Religious affiliation: Catholic
- Established: 1964
- Principal: Liam Reilly
- Gender: Male
- Enrollment: 700+
- Colours: Red and white
- Trustees: Edmund Rice Schools Trust
- Website: staidanscbs.ie

St Aidan's C.B.S. is an Irish Christian Brothers secondary school under the trusteeship of the Edmund Rice Schools Trust located on Collins Avenue, Dublin. It is beside Dublin City University. Most St Aidan's students have progressed from the local primary schools such as Holy Child BNS; Our Lady of Victories, Ballymun; St Patrick's National School, Drumcondra; and St Fiachra's School, Beaumont.

== History of the school ==
=== Early years ===
The school was opened in 1964 in two classrooms of Larkhill Boys National School at the invitation of Fr. Brady, parish priest of Whitehall. Brother Paul Hayes was the school's first principal. In 1965 the expansion of the school began.

Around this time, Albert College was moving to the Lyons Estate in Celbridge, leaving a site available for another school, which St Aidan's was quick to take advantage of. The government was providing 90% capital grants to schools to build and expand alongside the introduction of free secondary education by Donogh O'Malley, leading to increased numbers. Phase One of the new school was completed in January 1968 and phase 2 was completed by September of that same year.

=== First extension ===
During the 1970s the school building began to undergo serious deterioration causing massive amounts of money to be spent on maintenance. The Department of Education was informed of the situation. An application was made to the Department in 1982 for a new building. The main building continued to weaken. In 1986 the school was offered a Schedule of Accommodation stating the rooms and facilities allowed in the building. A preliminary planning briefing meeting between the school's planning team and that of the department took place and a site feasibility report was drawn up in 1987. But no more progress was made. Whether to rebuild the school or not was brought up in the Dáil. The Minister for state re – examined the question of rebuilding the school in 1988. In 1989 the school manager, parents and teachers met with the minister for education who promised a reply within 8 weeks. hit or miss

In May 1990 there was still no reply. A new building was finally ready for students in September 1995. Although the new school building was ready for students in September 1995, the official opening ceremony didn't take place until the 18th of the following October. The opening was attended by Minister for Education and Science Niamh Bhreathnach TD, Archbishop of Dublin Desmond Connell and past pupil Bertie Ahern, TD In honour of the occasion the Archbishop said mass in the hall. Presently there is more development underway in the form of two extra classrooms which will lead to the provision of a lunch room in the main building.

=== Second extension ===
Work began on Phase Two in September 2007. This expansion comprised a second building consisting of two classrooms, a small office, kitchenette and a WC although the layout is subject to change. The extension is currently facilitates the school library and a classroom which features an Interactive Whiteboard. The building, complemented by new paving, was opened by past pupil the Taoiseach Bertie Ahern in September 2008.

=== North/South Schools link ===
On 26 November 1998, the Taoiseach Bertie Ahern and the British Prime Minister Tony Blair visited St Aidan's as part of the launch of the North-South schools link, which included schools in Limavady, Omagh and Cork.

== Facilities ==
=== Library ===
The school also has a library fully stocked with books of a variety of types and classifications. These range from classic and modern literature to books which aid students in studying their special topic for Leaving Certificate history.

=== Computer rooms ===
There are two computer rooms in the school. They are used for many things including Transition Year projects such as the English Speaking Exam which requires a speech and a PowerPoint presentation; career guidance projects like curricula vitae and CAO applications as well as history research for special topics

=== Sporting facilities ===
There is a gym, the Edmund Rice Hall, in addition to two full outdoor pitches and two basketball courts. The facilities within the school are complemented by the use of the pool in DCU. There is also the new hall that was opened in 2014. The school is also currently replacing one of their outdoor pitches with an astro pitch which is expected to be ready by the 2016–17 school year. The other pitch was also renovated and flattened out and it is currently unknown when it will be ready to use.

== Academia ==
=== Junior Certificate ===
St Aidan's offers Junior Certificate and Leaving Certificate courses and the Transition Year Programme. In addition to the mandatory English, Irish and Maths, for Junior Certificate, St Aidan's offers Business Studies, History, Geography, Science, C.S.P.E., S.P.H.E., French, and Religious Education. There is also the choice of practical subjects: Woodwork, Technology, Technical Graphics, Music and Art.

=== Transition Year Programme ===
The Transition Year Programme that St Aidan's offer contains a wide variety of subjects and activities. It contains all of the subjects that appear on the Junior Certificate Syllabus including all practical subjects. However the manner in which they are taught differs to the Junior Certificate with much emphasis placed on research and presentation. The activities undertaken by Transition Year students include learning to dance in preparation for a competition and numerous trips throughout the year including Connemara, Newgrange, the National Museum of Ireland and Barcelona. Students also take part in a student – run mini company which is then brought to a trade fair. Another option is the YSI (Young Social Innovators) or Formula 1 in which students construct a gas powered car and enter it in races.

=== Leaving Certificate ===
For the Leaving Certificate, students must continue to study English, Irish, Maths with many studying French. Students may also choose to study Biology, Chemistry, Physics, Business, Accounting, Economics, History, Computer Science, Geography, Construction Studies, Technology, Art, Music, Applied Maths, as well as the LCVP Programme. In 2009 93% of Leaving Certificate students went on to study at third level. This was the best performance of any non fee-paying boys secondary school in North Dublin.

== Extra curricular activities ==
=== Sport ===
There are two PE classes per week for junior cycle students along with extra curricular sports. The school has known particular success with athletics and water polo. In water polo St Aidan's won the All Ireland Cup in 2007 and retained it in 2008. Hurling has also known successes including the senior team, coached by James Carmody narrowly missing out on winning the All Ireland ‘B’ competition. In 2009 the U-16 basketball team, coached by Ms. Peoples, won the All-Ireland Title for the first time led by top scorers Paul Caffrey and Mark Blanchfield.

In 2007, St Aidan's re-entered a soccer team at Under 19 level for the first time in many years. In 2008, they reached the final of the competition, only to be beaten by St. David's CBS Artane on a score of 2–3. The game was played in Home Farm FC. The team was run by league of Ireland footballer/teacher Michael Kelly and Actor/Teacher Darragh Humphreys.

=== Debating and public speaking ===
Public speaking mainly takes place in each of the junior years, there is a competition within each; every class selects its best speaker by way of a semi final. The final then has a representative from each class. Students, in general, choose their own topic on which to speak.

St Aidan's has known significant success in debating competitions in recent years. Students David Doyle, Karl Elliott, Ben Griffin, and Anthony Madden have all reached the quarter-finals of the All-Ireland Schools' Debating Competition; a feat unmatched by nearby schools. Success has also been marked in the AIB Phil Speaks Competition, where in recent years Andrew Linn won the junior competition and David Doyle came second in the senior competition in a grand final where half of the debaters were St. Aidan's students. In 2008 the competition saw its greatest numbers with over 1,000 students taking part and St Aidan's was well represented by Linn, and Elliott taking second and fourth place, respectively. In 2007 Transition Year students Elliot, Andrew Salter and Craig O'Hare reached the Leinster finals of the European Parliament Schools Debating Competition and received a special commendation from adjudicator Eileen Dunne. The students are aided in their endeavours by former staff member and coach Tim O'Connor.

=== Robocup ===
In 2006 and 2007 St Aidan's Students Andrew Jordan, Kevin Reilly, Eoin McCormac and Aaron Kennedy won the Irish Robocup competition. In 2006 this allowed them to proceed to the international competition in Germany and in 2007 Atlanta in the United States. The RoboCup was held in Bremen in Germany in 2006 and Atlanta in 2007.

=== Immersion programme ===
In 2009 a group of ten students from the fifth year and transition year spent almost two weeks in Tanzania as part of the Third World Immersion programme. Raising over €30,000, Mark Blanchfield, Niall Farrell, Niall O'Donnell, Kevin Hogan, Paul McCarthy, Oisin Mulhall, Kevin Reilly, Kevin Ashton, Ronan Noonan and Robert Keenan, accompanied by Ms. Ruane and Ms. Walsh, spent their time in various activities including experiencing the Tanzanian schooling system in the Edmund Rice Sinon School. They visited and took part in activities in an orphanage, youth detention centre and eco-village.

The students came back all the richer for the experience and deemed it a success. A trip was organised for a new group of students in 2011; the pupils involved raised 16,000 euros. This Programme has since been stopped due to the COVID-19 Pandemic

This Programme has since become bi-annual, with the last Immersion Programme to Tanzania taking place at the end of October 2019 to November 7, 2019, with a layover in Amsterdam.

=== Euroscola ===
In March 2017, 4th and 5th year students from the school partook in the European Parliament's Euroscola programme. This came following a national art contest won by Rodrigo Soberon Pena under the theme of European cities outside Ireland during 1916.

== Notable alumni ==
- Bertie Ahern, former Taoiseach
- David Brophy, principal conductor of the RTÉ Concert Orchestra
- Colm Hayes (real name Colm Caffrey) the 2fm D.J. attended St. Aidan's
- Cllr Andrew Montague served as Lord Mayor of Dublin 2011-2012
- Michael Nugent, writer
- Noel Rock Former TD for Dublin North West
- Gaelic footballers such as Tommy Drumm, Paul Clarke, Dave Synnott, Paddy Christie and Paddy Moran, Tomas Brady, Joseph Boland
- Olympians Owen Casey (tennis), Paul Ward (cycling), and Niall Bruton (athletics)
- Former Republic of Ireland footballers Liam Brady, Mark Kinsella

== Former teachers ==
- Tommy Broughan, former TD for Dublin North East
- Rory Kinsella, former hurler and manager
