= Risteárd Cooper =

Irish actor, comedian, singer and writer

- Born: February 1969 (age 57)
- Occupations: Actor; Comedian; Writer
- Spouse: Suzanne McMahon (m. 1998)
- Children: 2

Risteárd Cooper (/ˈrɪʃtɑːrd/; born February 1969) is an Irish actor, comedian, singer and writer and is one third of comedy trio Après Match.

Cooper's parents Cáit Lanigan and Richard Cooper were both educated through Irish and were highly accomplished singers and musicians. Risteárd attended Scoil Bhríde, an Irish speaking primary school in Ranelagh, Dublin, and St Michael's College, Ballsbridge.

He joined the National Youth Theatre aged 16. On leaving school Cooper gained a singing scholarship at the College of Music, Dublin and graduated from the acting program at the Samuel Beckett Centre, Trinity College.

He lived in New York for several years, where he worked at the Ensemble Studio Theatre, the Irish Rep and Chicago's Steppenwolf Theatre Company (founded by, amongst others, John Malkovich) playing Mickey in the American premiere of Jez Butterworth's Olivier award-winning play, Mojo directed by Ian Rickson.

He has played lead roles in major theatres in Ireland, the UK and the USA including Observe the Sons of Ulster Marching Towards the Somme at the Abbey Theatre, Auntie and Me at the Gaiety Theatre, I Keano at the Olympia Theatre, and in numerous productions at the Gate Theatre such as Arcadia, An Ideal Husband, See You Next Tuesday, Eccentricities of a Nightingale, Betrayal (Pinter Festival) and The Deep Blue Sea.

He played the role of Dmitri in Brian Friel's play The Yalta Game, directed by Patrick Mason for the Gate Theatre at the 2009 Sydney and Edinburgh Festivals.He starred as Setanta de Paor in An Crisis, an Irish language satirical comedy series for TG4 for which he was nominated Best Comedy Actor at the 2010 Monte Carlo Awards.

In 2011, he wrote and starred in a series of parodies on YouTube sponsored by sports betting agency Betdaq.

Later that year he played Henry Higgins in the Abbey Theatre's first ever production of Shaw's Pygmalion going on in 2012 to star as Joxer Daly with Ciarán Hinds (Boyle) and Sinéad Cusack (Juno) in O'Casey's Juno and the Paycock at the Abbey Theatre, before transferring to the National Theatre of Great Britain.

In 2013 he played Finbar in a production of Conor McPherson's The Weir at The Donmar Warehouse, which transferred to the West End in 2014. It also starred Brian Cox, Dervla Kirwin, Ardal O'Hanlon and Peter McDonald and was directed by Josie Rourke.

In September 2014 he appeared as Sir Henry Coverly in the ITV drama The Suspicions of Mr Whicher "The Ties That Bind", while in 2015 he portrayed Dermot Nally in RTÉ's "Charlie" and Laurie Gaskell in the critically acclaimed comedy-drama "No Offence" for Channel 4.

Cooper has since appeared in such shows as “Delicious” with English comedienne Dawn French and “Quiz” directed by Stephen Frears.

He performs his own comedy sketch series for sports show “Off the Ball” on YouTube.

More recently he played Lawrence in the UK premiere of Anne Washburn's play "Shipwreck" directed by Rupert Goold at The Almeida Theatre, London, while TV and Film projects include ITV's "Too Close" opposite Emily Watson, the Amazon Prime series "The Power", Channel 5's "The Inheritance", Hallmark's "Murder in G Major" and a new comedy called "Fran the Man" to be released in late 2024.

== Appearances ==
The following is a list of appearances by Risteard Cooper.

- "Bird Sanctuary - Abbey Theatre debut (1995)
- Après Match RTÉ (1998 - present)
- "Cyrano" Gate Theatre debut (1998)
- The Closer You Get (2000) - Father Hubert Mallone
- This is Ireland by Arthur Mathews BBC 2 (2004)
- Chasing the Lions TV3 (2005)
- I, Keano (2005)
- Batman Begins (2005) - Captain Simonson
- Chasing The Blues (2007)
- Bittersweet RTÉ 1 (2008)
- Chase the Lions RTÉ (2009)
- An Crisis (2010, TV Series, TG4) - Setanta de Paor
- "Pygmalion - Abbey (2011)
- "Juno & the Paycock - National Theatre (2012)
- "The Weir - West End (2013 & 2014)
- "The Suspicions of Mr Whicher" - ITV (2014)
- "Charlie" - RTÉ 1 (2015)
- "No Offence" Channel 4 (2015)
- "Delicious" - Sky 1 (2017) Played the part of James Harley
- "Extraordinary" - Movie (2019)
- Quiz - ITV (2020)
- Haunted Harmony Mysteries (2023)
