= CountMeOut.ie =

CountMeOut.ie was a website in Ireland, the main purpose of which was to encourage and direct Irish people to leave the Catholic Church. It was started by friends Cormac Flynn, Paul Dunbar and Gráinne O'Sullivan, after researching the process of how to leave the Catholic Church. They discovered that reforms by Pope John Paul II in the Second Vatican Council formalised the process of leaving. An official declaration of defection document had been produced by the Vatican since 2006 because of the 1% tax in Germany levied by the German Government for the benefit of Churches. The website created a PDF of this form through a three-step process, allowing users to print and send the documentation to the diocese where they were baptised. It gained some media coverage, particularly after the Ryan Report about abuse cases by some clerics in Irish Industrial schools. Awards.ie declared for it a Realex Payments Web Award in 2009.

Over 12,000 people downloaded a Declaration of Defection from CountMeOut.ie, but changes to canon law in 2009 made it difficult for the site to operate, according to the founder.

== See also ==
- Formal act of defection from the Catholic Church
- Actus formalis defectionis ab Ecclesia catholica
- Eroakirkosta.fi
