= Michael Nugent =

Irish writer and activist (born 1961)

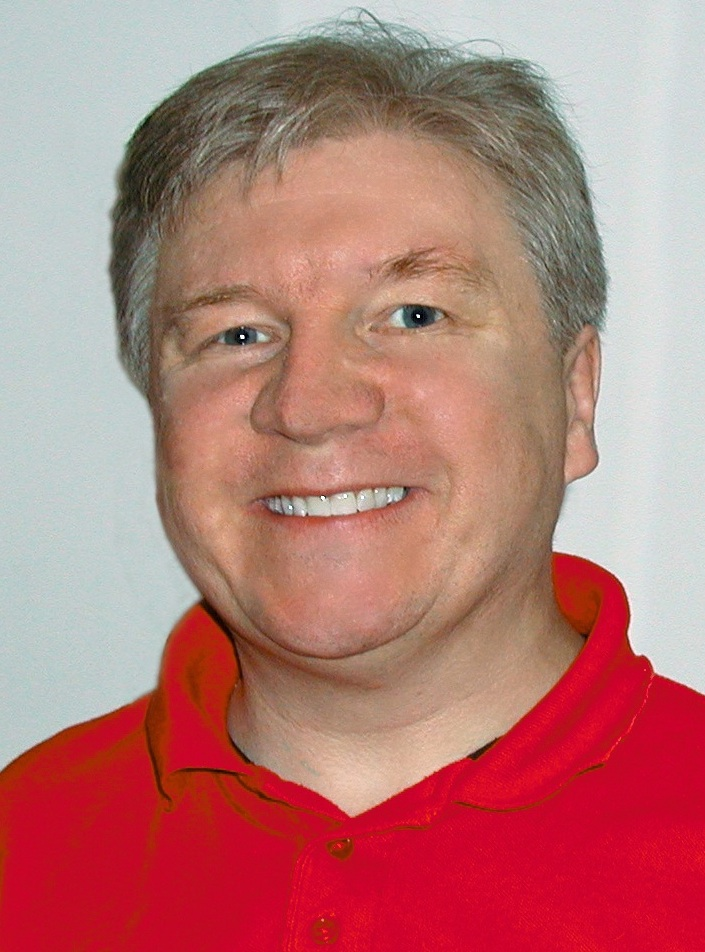
- Nugent in 2010
- Born: 1 June 1961 (age 65); Dublin, Ireland
- Education: St. Aidan's C.B.S. Dublin Institute of Technology
- Occupation: Writer
- Known for: Writing I, Keano; Challenging Irish blasphemy law
- Title: Chairperson, Atheist Ireland
- Website: https://www.michaelnugent.com https://twitter.com/micknugent

Michael Nugent (born 1 June 1961) is an Irish writer and activist. He has written, co-written or contributed to seven books and the comedy musical play I, Keano. He has campaigned on many political issues, often with his late wife Anne Holliday, and is chairperson of the advocacy group Atheist Ireland.

== Early life ==
Nugent was completing a project on the Gospels in primary school when he started to question the "comic book" nature of the Bible. He attended St. Aidan's C.B.S. secondary school in Whitehall in Dublin. He graduated in visual communications in 1983 at the College of Marketing and Design, now part of the Dublin Institute of Technology. In 1983, he was elected president of the college students' union and students' representative on the Dublin City Council Vocational Education Committee. In 1984, he was defeated when he ran for the post of education officer in the Union of Students in Ireland, in opposition to Joe Duffy, then USI president, who is now a broadcaster with RTÉ. He then took a course in product development, and set up as a freelance designer.

== Marriage ==
In 2009, Nugent married his longtime partner Anne Holliday, after she was diagnosed with cancer. She died on 9 April 2011, aged 57. Holliday and Nugent were founder members in 1988 of New Consensus, the group which called for the revision of the Republic's territorial claim on the North and devolved government for the people of Northern Ireland based on "mutual respect, civil liberty and freely given allegiance", and they helped to organise the Peace Train campaign to end disruption of the north–south rail link by the IRA. Holliday was also a Simon Community volunteer, a founder member of the Limerick chapter of the Irish Georgian Society, campaigned to save Wood Quay, and was active in residents rights issues. She worked as a secretary at the law firm Matheson Ormsby Prentice, a Dáil secretary for TDs Michael Keating and Roger Garland, personal assistant to National Museum Director Pat Wallace, in media relations and special projects at the Department of Arts, Sports and Tourism, and in the Tánaiste's office at the Department of Enterprise, Trade and Employment. Holliday donated her body to medical research and, in 2014, her body was buried in the Dublin medical Schools plot in Glasnevin cemetery in Dublin. After a request from Nugent, the Dublin Medical Schools agreed to change the religious wording on the headstone over the plot to a secular wording, so that it would be inclusive of people of all religious beliefs and none. In 2015 Nugent wrote a tribute to his wife in the Irish Times in which he also wrote about coping with bereavement as an atheist.

== Writing ==
Nugent has written, co-written or contributed to seven books and the 2005 comedy musical play I, Keano.

=== Works ===
- I, Keano, updated revival of comedy musical play with Arthur Mathews and Paul Woodfull, 2015
- Contributor to Who Owns Marriage?, 2015 Irish Evangelical Alliance, edited by Nick Park
- Contributor to Towards Mutual Ground – Pluralism, Religious Education and Diversity in Irish Schools, 2013 ISBN 978-1223055381
- I, Keano, comedy musical play with Arthur Mathews and Paul Woodfull, 2005
- Absurdly Yours – The Michael Nugent Letters, 2004 ISBN 1-84131-671-7
- That's Ireland – A Miscellany, with Damien Corless, 2003 ISBN 1-84131-633-4
- Ireland on the Internet – The Definitive Guide, 1995 ISBN 0-86121-647-4
- Dear Me – The Diary of John Mackay, 1994 ISBN 0-86121-615-6
- Dear John – The John Mackay Letters, with Sam Smyth, 1993 ISBN 0-86121-550-8 (hardback ISBN 0-86121-530-3)

== Early activism ==
In 1986, Nugent joined the newly founded Progressive Democrats, working with Michael Keating TD, a friend since his VEC days. He soon left the PDs, saying that he was disillusioned with the clientilist system and that he believed in the need to tackle the Northern Ireland problem on a cross-party basis.

In the late 1980s, Nugent was spokesperson for a campaign against the conviction of two Tallaght youths for robbery and assault. In 1990, Taoiseach Charles Haughey assured the youths' families and Nugent that new evidence would be considered. In 1993, the government announced a new law to enable this to happen and, in 2001, the case was declared a miscarriage of justice.

=== New Consensus ===
In 1988, Nugent co-founded the New Consensus peace group with his partner Anne Holliday and Michael Fitzpatrick. He also chaired the group. Its launch meeting in April 1989 announced its aims as challenging ambivalence about murder in Northern Ireland, and promoting a democratic, pluralist and non-sectarian society with integrated education, a bill of rights and revision of Articles 2 and 3 of the Irish Constitution.

In 1992, after an IRA bomb killed eight Protestant workmen in Teebane Cross, Nugent and six other men protested by chaining themselves across the entrance of the Sinn Féin office in Dublin. New Consensus also organised peace rallies and pickets of Sinn Féin and UDA offices, and collections of flowers after paramilitary killings.

Sinn Féin regularly said that New Consensus did not protest against violence by the security forces in Northern Ireland. Nugent responded falsely that they protested when agents of the British or Irish States acted outside the law. When New Consensus picketed the Belfast offices of the loyalist UDA, some said that it was only in response to criticism of imbalance. Also some single-issue peace groups, such as Peace 93 and the Peace Train Organisation, distanced themselves from the political aims of New Consensus.

In 1970 Sinn Féin had split into Provisional and Official Sinn Féin, with Official Sinn Féin later becoming the Workers' Party and then Democratic Left before merging with the Labour Party, which mirrored a split within the IRA, which split into the Official IRA and the Provisional IRA. The Official IRA officially decommissioned in 2010. Although the group declined in support from 1972, it remained linked to Official Sinn Féin and was frequently accused of committing robberies and fraud to fund the party. Some political commentators such as Vincent Browne and Paddy Prendeville said that the Workers' Party and Democratic Left had an attitude to Northern Ireland that was close to Ulster unionism. New Consensus was regularly derided by Sinn Féin and a number of commentators who stated that the group was a front for the Workers' Party. During pickets members of Sinn Féin would challenge picketers about the Official IRA and killings and acts associated with the group. Both New Consensus and the parties denied this.

=== Libel case ===
In 1996, Nugent, Anne Holliday and Michael Fitzpatrick won a libel action against the Irish author and historian Tim Pat Coogan and HarperCollins Publishers over a claim that "New Consensus" was an offshoot of Official Sinn Féin. The author and publishers apologised in court, stating they had made a mistake.

=== Veritas ===
In 1992, Nugent highlighted that Veritas, a bookshop owned by the Catholic Bishops, was breaking the law by selling an anti-abortion book, Closed by Joseph Scheidler, which contained abortion clinic contact details for potential protestors. Under Irish law at the time no contact details of any abortion service could be published.

=== Joycean home ===
In 1996, he and his partner Anne Holliday organised an email campaign to protest against the proposed demolition of James Joyce's childhood home in Drumcondra. The campaign received messages of support from Joyce scholars in Britain, Australia, Canada and the US, which were passed on to Dublin Corporation.

=== Council election candidate ===
In 1999, he was a local election candidate for Dublin City Council, running for Fine Gael in the Ballymun–Whitehall local electoral area, but he failed to be elected.

=== European Investment Bank ===
In 2000, Nugent helped to stop the Irish government appointing a disgraced former judge, Hugh O'Flaherty, to the European Investment Bank. The Bank accepted Nugent's argument that they had a statutory duty to consider other candidates, and he forwarded the CV of Irish Senator and business editor Shane Ross. After public pressure, O'Flaherty withdrew his candidacy.

=== Football related activism ===
Nugent supports Bohemians and Leeds United football clubs. In 2002, he helped to prevent the Football Association of Ireland from selling broadcast rights for international matches to Sky television, but failed in an attempt to create a representative body for Irish football fans. In 2008, he was removed as a director of Bohemian Football Club after he questioned the viability of the club's growing expenditure.

== Atheist Ireland ==
Nugent is the chair of Atheist Ireland, an advocacy group for an ethical and secular society. Its first AGM in 2009 outlined specific aims, including the removal of references to God from the Irish constitution, the introduction of a secular education system, and a campaign to encourage people to read the Bible.

He represented Atheist Ireland at the first formal meeting between a Taoiseach and members of an atheist advocacy group in the history of the State, where they argued how the Constitution, education system and laws and practices systemically discriminate against atheists.

=== Atheism and religion ===
Nugent was the opening speaker at the 2011 World Atheist Convention in Dublin, Ireland, which adopted the Dublin Declaration on Secularism and launched Atheist Alliance International, a newly restructured umbrella group for atheists worldwide. He told the convention that atheists were considered arrogant "because we do not believe that the entire universe was created for our benefit", and because they did not believe "that the most powerful being ever created a universe of over 100 billion galaxies, each with over 100 billion stars like our Sun, which existed for 14 billion years, and then picked one of the 100 billion galaxies and picked one of the 100 billion stars in that galaxy, and picked one planet revolving around that star and of the million species on that planet he picked one animal member of all those species and said: 'I've really got to tell that guy to stop gathering sticks on the Sabbath'."

He described a radio debate with irate Catholics protesting against an art exhibition as being "like discussing the rules of quidditch with people who believe Harry Potter was a documentary." He predicted that moderate religious belief will become a minority position in many countries. He said that religion is being squeezed by science, which undermines its claims about reality, and secularism, which erodes its positions on morality. He also wrote a series of five articles for the Irish Times about atheism and its relationship to reality, morality, faith and Jesus.

Nugent published a manifesto on "ethical atheism" that sought to promote reason, critical thinking and science, natural compassion and ethics, inclusive, caring atheist groups and fair and just societies, and challenged the myths that atheism is a religion or belief system based on faith and certainty, and that we need religion for meaning and morality. In a BBC radio debate, he defended Richard Dawkins against charges by New Humanist editor Daniel Trilling that some criticism of Islam was a cover for racist views.

He told an RTÉ debate about miracles that you have a better chance of dying than being cured at Lourdes. He described Pope Francis as a pope of the global south with good PR in the global north, saying that as two in every three Catholics live in the global south, Pope Francis has to appeal to Catholics with very different values. He debated on RTÉ Radio with a Catholic priest who said that he would not report child rape to the police if he heard about it in Confession. He told TV3's People's Debate on homophobia that the Catholic Church is overtly homophobic, and is becoming more so as its population shifts to the global South. He debated the Christian theologian William Lane Craig in University College Cork about the existence of God.

=== Secular constitution ===
Nugent opposed the law against blasphemous libel introduced by Justice Minister Dermot Ahern. He described it as "silly and dangerous", and argued that ideas should always be open to criticism and ridicule. As part of the campaign, he was involved in the formation of the parody Church of Dermotology, which satirises organised religion and the concept of blasphemy, and in the launch of a website opposing the bill, called Blasphemy.ie.

When the Irish blasphemy law came into force in 2010, Atheist Ireland published a list of 25 blasphemous quotes on its website to challenge it. The Justice Minister proposed that a referendum should be held to remove the offence of blasphemy from the Irish Constitution. Nugent told RTÉ that the Irish blasphemy law had caused Irish media to self-censor their output, saying that he had been told before several live interviews not to say anything blasphemous.

When Irish police investigated comedian Stephen Fry for alleged blasphemy in 2017, Nugent welcomed the move because it highlighted a law that he said was "silly, silencing, and dangerous". When the police dropped the investigation because they could not find a large number of people who were outraged by Fry's comments, Nugent said that this created a dangerous incentive for people to demonstrate outrage when they see or hear something that they believe is blasphemous.

In 2018 Nugent welcomed a new Government decision to hold a referendum to remove the offence of blasphemy from the constitution. He said that even in the absence of prosecutions the law was causing real damage to freedom of expression in Ireland, and to the country's reputation abroad. He said that it's never a good look when Pakistan, where people are killed for blasphemy, is speaking approvingly of your laws.

Nugent told the Oireachtas health committee on abortion law to stop the unethical pattern of lawmaking by reacting to personal tragedies, and to base abortion law on human rights and compassion and not on religious doctrines. He supported a referendum in 2018 to remove the constitutional ban on abortion, saying it would enable pregnant women to make their own ethical decisions, based on their own conscience, but he added that he makes no claim that all atheists share this view. He asked the Standards in Public Office Commission to examine the funding of the Catholic bishops' referendum campaign in support of retaining the Amendment.

He asked the Tánaiste (deputy prime minister) Eamon Gilmore, who is agnostic, to refuse to swear the religious oath that he had to swear as a member of the Council of State, but Gilmore said that he had taken legal advice and that he had a constitutional obligation to swear the oath.

=== Secular education ===
Nugent campaigns for secular education in Ireland, including in an alliance between Atheist Ireland, the Evangelical Alliance of Ireland, and the Ahmadiyya Muslim Community of Ireland. He argues for secular schools that would not ignore religion, but would teach children about religions and beliefs in an objective, critical and pluralist manner, while respecting everybody's human rights.

He launched the Schools Equality PACT in 2015, which outlined Atheist Ireland's plans for a fair education system. PACT is an acronym for four areas of legal change – Patronage, Access, Curriculum and Teaching. He argued that the Louise O'Keeffe judgment at the European Court of Human Rights could begin the end of State-supported religious discrimination in Irish schools. The European Court had told the Irish State it was responsible for protecting the human rights of children while in school, regardless of whether it runs the schools directly.

Nugent said that Government plans in 2016 to encourage the Catholic Church to transfer patronage of primary schools would make the situation worse for most families, as the Catholic Church wanted a stronger Catholic ethos in the schools they would retain. He said that reducing teaching time for religion classes was not the most important issue because schools implement the religious ethos throughout the entire school day.

Hibernia College, an online teacher-training institution in Dublin, removed slides from its religion module for primary teachers in 2012 at the request of Atheist Ireland. The course notes had said that atheist humanism produced the worst horrors history has ever witnessed.

The following year Nugent announced a new project in which Atheist Ireland and Educate Together were preparing lessons about atheism that would be taught in Ireland's primary schools for the first time. He said this was necessary because the Irish education system has for too long been totally biased in favour of religious indoctrination. Nugent noted that Atheist Ireland was not pushing for atheist schools, but rather pluralistic, objective alternatives to religious ones.

A Dublin school canceled an invitation to Nugent to address its final-year students on the basis that it would clash with its Catholic ethos.

=== Church-state separation ===
Nugent also campaigns on other issues of church-state separation in Ireland. He said the Good Friday drink ban is silly, and that people should be able to drink in the same way on any Friday as they can on any Thursday or Saturday. When the law was repealed in 2018, he invited people to 'an evening of legalised normality' at Atheist Ireland's first ever Good Friday Atheists in the Pub session.

Nugent criticised the question "What is your religion?" in the 2011 Irish census. He said the census should instead ask "Do you have a religion?" and "If so, what is it?" He asked nonreligious Irish people to tick the No Religion box. He warned that joke responses to the religion question in the census, being categorised as "not stated", potentially contribute to an underreporting of the number of non-religious people.

He called for the removal of the daily Angelus from RTÉ, saying that it amounted to a free advert for the Catholic Church, and he debated the issue on RTÉ radio with Roger Childs, RTÉ's editor of religious programmes. When RTÉ unveiled a new-look 6pm TV Angelus, he argued that it is not the role of a public service broadcaster to take a Catholic call to prayer and turn it into something else.

He told Radio Kerry that the placement of a cross in Kerry Council chamber represents the promotion of the supremacy of one religion over other religions and none.

When Atheist Ireland declined an invitation to take part in the Government's commemorations of the 1916 Rising, Donald Clarke of the Irish Times said that Nugent and his team could hardly have seemed more out of touch if they'd sought to ban Christmas.

=== International secularism ===
Nugent was given the award of International Atheist of the Year 2017 by the Kazimierz Lyszczynski Foundation in Warsaw, Poland, along with Fauzia Ilyas, founder of the Atheist & Agnostic Alliance Pakistan. He said that he accepted the award on behalf of all of the work done by everybody in Atheist Ireland.

He argued for secularism and ethical atheism and against blasphemy laws at the Freedom From Religion Convention in Raleigh, North Carolina, USA. He spoke at the 2010 Gods and Politics international atheist conference in Copenhagen, Denmark.

Nugent spoke at the 2012 European Atheist Convention in Cologne, Germany, against blasphemy and apostasy laws. He said they were silly in western states and dangerous in Islamic states. He said on RTÉ that the Irish blasphemy law was influencing blasphemy debates at the United Nations and in Islamic countries. Speaking again in Germany in 2015, on the day of the Irish marriage equality referendum victory, he described the result as the start of the fall of Ireland's religious Berlin Wall.

He and Jane Donnelly of Atheist Ireland briefed the United Nations Human Rights Committee in Geneva, Switzerland, before the UN questioned Ireland's human rights record under the International Covenant on Civil and Political Rights. The following year, they briefed the United Nations Committee on Economic, Social and Cultural Rights in Geneva, Switzerland, before the UN questioned Ireland's human rights record, and told the Committee that Ireland repeatedly ignores the rights of atheists and non-Christian children in the education system. In 2016 they twice briefed the United Nations in Geneva, Switzerland, as the UN prepared to question Ireland's human rights record under the Covenant the Rights of the Child, and the Universal Periodic Review process.

Nugent has spoken at several OSCE Human Dimension Implementation Meetings in Warsaw, Poland, opposing discrimination against atheists and agnostics. He said that it was absurd to insist that we respect all religions and all prophets, and said that "we can respect your right to believe, while not respecting the content of your beliefs". He addressed a meeting in Brussels at which the Presidents of the European Commission, European Parliament and European Council discussed the fight against poverty and social exclusion with representatives of philosophical non-confessional organisations.

In 2017 Nugent was part of a joint delegation from Atheist Ireland, the Evangelical Alliance of Ireland, and the Ahmadiyya Muslim Community of Ireland, to the United Nations Humans Rights Committee when the UN was questioning Pakistan about its human rights record. The three groups raised issues related to freedom of religion and belief, the Pakistan blasphemy law, and related violence including mob lynchings of Ahmadis, forced conversions of Christians, and disappearances of secular bloggers.

== Right to die ==
In 2011 Nugent's wife Anne Holliday died of cancer, after making plans to take her own life if she felt that she needed to. In 2012, Nugent, Tom Curran and Máirín de Burca founded Right To Die Ireland, a campaign group to legalise assisted suicide in Ireland. Tom Curran is the co-ordinator of Exit International Ireland, and Máirín De Burca is a former secretary of Official Sinn Féin. In 2013, when the Supreme Court ruled that Tom Curran's partner Marie Fleming did not have a constitutional right to assisted suicide, Nugent said on RTÉ that the law would have to catch up with the reality that terminally ill people will take their own ethical decisions based on their own personal conscience. In 2014, he told Today FM that the right to die is not merely about the act of dying, but also about the increased quality of life that comes from knowing that you have the option to end your suffering if you need to, and he told Newstalk radio that Right to Die Ireland was working with legal people and politicians to prepare a Bill on assisted dying for Dáil Éireann. In 2015, he welcomed California's vote to legalise assisted suicide, and he told BBC Radio Ulster that changes in the law in the UK and Ireland were inevitable as society became more compassionate. In 2016, he told RTÉ that people who wanted palliative care should have the right to palliative care, that people who want to die in a way of their choosing should have that right, and that terminally ill people and their loved ones should absolutely break the law to avoid unnecessary suffering.

== Media and talks ==
Nugent has been profiled or interviewed in the Irish Times, the Sunday Business Post, the Sunday Independent and the BBC Mundo Spanish language website. He has been interviewed on various broadcast media including the BBC World Service, NPR's All Things Considered, and RTÉ's Prime Time, Ryan Tubridy, Today with Pat Kenny, Spirit Moves, and Seoige and O'Shea.

Nugent speaks and debates in Ireland and internationally. He has spoken in Ireland at Trinity College Dublin, University College Dublin, Dublin Institute of Technology, University College Cork, National University of Ireland Galway and Maynooth, the Royal College of Surgeons, and the Oireachtas Health Committee. He has addressed several United Nations human rights reviews in Geneva, Switzerland, and OSCE Human Dimension Implementation Meetings in Warsaw, Poland. He has also spoken at the South Place Ethical Society in London, England in 2010; the Gods and Politics Conference in Copenhagen, Denmark in 2010; the World Atheist Convention in Dublin, Ireland in 2011; the Muslim Debate Initiative in London, England in 2012; the European Atheist Conferences in Cologne, Germany in 2012 and 2015; the Oxford Union in England in 2013; the Freedom From Religion Foundation Convention in Raleigh, North Carolina, USA in 2014; the Rationalist International Conferences in Tallinn, Estonia in 2016, and Helsinki, Finland in 2017; the International Conference on Freedom of Conscience in London in 2017; the International Association of Freethought Congress in Paris in 2017, and the Days of Atheism in Warsaw, Poland in 2017 and 2018.
