= Brent Pope (rugby analyst) =

- Born: Brent Pope; 27 October 1962 (age 64) Ashburton, New Zealand
- Height: 1.93 m (6 ft 4 in)
- Weight: 105 kg (16 st 7 lb; 231 lb)

Rugby union career
- Position: No.8 or flanker
Senior career
Years	Team	Apps	(Points)
- Otago

Brent Pope (born 27 October 1962) is a New Zealand born rugby television analyst, rugby journalist, charity worker, children's book author, after dinner speaker, founder of Outside in Art Gallery in Dublin, owner of POPE shirts and shoes and founder of The Elephant in the Room, mental Health project. He was born, raised and spent most of his rugby playing career in New Zealand, but has lived and worked in Ireland for most of his coaching, broadcasting, media and business career.

== Playing career ==
Brent Pope played for various provincial and New Zealand underage teams before helping Otago to its first ever first division national title in 1991. Pope played over 100 first class games in New Zealand in a career that spanned over 10 years, mainly with the Dunedin-based side, during that time he formed potent loose forward trios with the likes of All Blacks Paul Henderson, Mike Brewer, Josh Kronfeld, Arran Pene and Jamie Joseph.

Pope played for the South Island on a number of occasions and was a final All Black trialist, all as part the larger 1987 New Zealand Rugby World Cup training squad, he had to withdraw a week before the tournament began due to a serious elbow injury in the final series of All Black trial matches. Pope came back after injury in 1987 and was nominated as one of New Zealand's outstanding domestic players of that year, Pope was also named Otago player of the year in 1987/8 and was again shortlisted for the All Blacks tour to Japan at the end of that year only to miss out when the tour party was trimmed due to the cancellation of a tour game. Pope played in a number of final All Black trials from 1987 to 1992, represented the South Island, Schools, NZ Universities, Leinster, Barbarians, All Blacks XV, New Zealand selection XV, International XV and was a Captain of the Penguins on many European tours. Pope also played representative county rugby in England and in United States where he was part of the OMBAC national championship winning side. He came to Ireland in 1991 where he played and later coached St Marys, Clontarf F.C. and Leinster A.

== Coaching career ==
Pope successfully coached both St Marys and Clontarf to 3 separate National Division AIL Rugby titles, 3 All Ireland Floodlit Cups, and 2 Leinster Senior Cups, the first in Clontarf since the 1956) Pope was the first ever Leinster-based Coach to win the AIB League First Division title with St Marys RFC in 1999/2000, he also coached at senior provincial level with Leinster A in 2000/1, and established the Irish Shamrocks, a touring Irish team to New Zealand for promising Irish club players.

== Rugby Pundit ==
Pope featured regularly as a rugby pundit on RTÉ, with presenter Tom McGurk and George Hook, in the coverage of Six Nations, International tests, and Heineken Cup matches.

== Celebrity ==
Brent has worked for RTÉ Sport for over 23 years and has also appeared in many crossover programmes such as The Restaurant, The Den, The Afternoon Show, The Hook and Popey Roadshow, The Late Late Show, The Saturday Night Show, and various travel programmes. Brent also starred as a singer in Charity You're A Star in 2007. In 2012 he learned and played the clarinet for RTÉ reality music show Instrumental. In 2012 he released a best-selling autobiography entitled Brent Pope – If You Really Knew Me. Brent was listed at no. 4 in a recent poll for Ireland's hottest male television stars, and in 2012/13 he was nominated as one of Ireland's best dressed men. In 2013, Brent launched his own fashion label called POPE (shoes and shirts) and is in over 100 retail stores in Ireland. In 2018 he released another book about mental health in sport entitled Win which he co-wrote with Jason Brennan that made the top selling book list.

He is also the curator of Outside In Art Gallery, a Dublin-based art gallery for mental health artists.

Pope is a recurring contributor to RTÉ Radio, Newstalk 106 and, in New Zealand, Murray Deaker's show, and is a regular after-dinner speaker. He is involved in several mental health charities, and is an ambassador for St. Patrick's Hospital's Walk in My Shoes, Cycle Against Suicide, and Rehab's People of the Year Awards.In 2022 Brent Pope received an IBEC lifetime award for work in Mental Health, and in the same year founded the Elephant in the Room movement.

In 2016 he appeared as a contestant in an episode of Celebrity Home of the Year on RTÉ One.

== Brent Pope Rugby Legends Foundation ==
In 2009, the Brent Pope Rugby Legends Foundation joined forces with the non-profit housing charity Habitat for Humanity Ireland. Brent has visited Zambia three times with the foundation, being accompanied by rugby legends Malcolm O'Kelly in June 2011 and by Liam Toland, Paddy Johns and Angus McKeen in June 2012. In September 2013 Brent visited Argentina to continue building houses in disadvantaged areas with PUMA rugby legends including Argentine Captain Felipe Contepomi.

== Writing ==
Brent was a regular print rugby journalist for the Evening Echo, Daily Mail and various other magazines such as Village and Emerald Rugby.

He has also published a series of award-winning children's books for charity. In 2013 Brent released his autobiography Brent Pope "If You Really Knew Me", which was shortlisted as one of the best sporting books in the UK at the 2013 British sportsbook of the year award. then followed that with best selling book called "Win" that reached no 1 in Ireland. Brent published his last children's book, "The Hip-Hop-Opotamus", in 2014
