= Sports Tonight (Irish TV programme) =

- Starring: Trevor Welch
- Opening theme: "Times Like These" by Foo Fighters
- Country of origin: Ireland

Production
- Running time: 30 minutes

Original release
- Network: TV3
- Release: 20 September 1998 – 23 March 2009

Sports Tonight is an Irish sports information television programme.

Originally broadcast from 1998 until 2009 on Virgin Media One (then known as TV3), the show aired Monday-Friday at 11:30pm. Sports Tonight was presented by Trevor Welch, with other TV3 sports journalists also contributing. These contributors included Aidan Cooney and Joanne Cantwell.

The show was axed on 23 March 2009 after broadcasting for more than a decade. This was due to budgetary cutbacks at TV3 and an emphasis being placed on live sports.
