= Secular Schools Ireland =

Patron body for national schools in Ireland

- Founded: 2015
- Dissolved: 2020
- Type: Educational
- Location: Ireland
- Services: Primary Education, Secondary Education, Teacher Training, Advocacy
- Key people: Jenny Lagerqvist, Aoife Harvey, Eamonn O'Leary, Lefre De Burgh
- Website: secularschoolsireland.com

Secular Schools Ireland was a patron body for national schools in Ireland. It was a voluntary organisation seeking to establish the country's first secular primary schools.

They were initially refused recognition, but were later allowed government recognition after legal action.

The organization was dissolved in January 2020.
