= WBNW (AM) =

- Concord, Massachusetts; United States
- Broadcast area: Greater Boston
- Frequency: 1120 kHz
- Branding: Money Matters Radio

Programming
- Format: Business talk
- Affiliations: Westwood One

Ownership
- Owner: Money Matters Radio, Inc.

History
- First air date: August 28, 1989
- Former call signs: WADN (1989–1998)
- Call sign meaning: "Business news"

Technical information
- Licensing authority: FCC
- Facility ID: 3013
- Class: B
- Power: 5,000 watts daytime; 1,000 watts nighttime
- Transmitter coordinates: 42°26′54.34″N 71°25′37.22″W
- Translator: 102.9 W275CM (Concord)

Links
- Public license information: Public file; LMS
- Webcast: Listen live (via TuneIn)
- Website: www.moneymattersboston.com

WBNW (1120 AM) is a business talk radio station in the Boston market. The station is owned by Money Matters Radio, Inc. and is licensed to Concord, Massachusetts. It is simulcast on translator station W275CM (102.9 FM) in Concord. WBNW's flagship program, The Financial Exchange, is syndicated to several other stations in New England through the Money Matters Radio Network. Among the talk hosts have been Michael Graham, Don Imus, and John Batchelor were added to the lineup.

== History ==
The station first took to the air August 28, 1989, as WADN, with a folk music format. Much of the station's staff had previously worked at an earlier Boston-area folk music station, WCAS (740 AM, now WJIB). Original owner Walden Communications Company sold the station to Assabet Communications Corporation on June 4, 1993.

Shortly after the original WBNW (590 AM) was acquired by Salem Communications and became religious station WEZE in December 1996, WADN announced that it would begin carrying some Bloomberg Radio programming; by the end of the month, the folk format was moved to weekends only to accommodate the business and talk programming, and in April 1997 folk was dropped entirely. Money Matters Radio bought WADN in 1998; it had produced the station's morning show, also simulcast on WPLM (1390 AM) in Plymouth, WNRB (1510 AM, now WMEX) in Boston, and Attleboro-based WARA (1320 AM), since 1997. The call letters were changed to WBNW on December 1, 1998 – a move to reinforce the station format's link to the former WBNW. The station currently belongs to a partnership led by Canadian–American investment counsellor Barry Armstrong.

== Translator ==
Broadcast translator for WBNW
| Call sign | Frequency | City of license | FID | ERP (W) | Class | Transmitter coordinates | FCC info |
|---|---|---|---|---|---|---|---|
| W275CM | 102.9 FM | Concord, Massachusetts | 138293 | 82 | D | 42°26′54.3″N 71°25′37.2″W | LMS |
