= WPLM (AM) =

- Plymouth, Massachusetts; United States
- Broadcast area: South Shore; Cape Cod
- Frequency: 1390 kHz
- Branding: WPLM-AM 1390

Programming
- Language: English
- Format: Talk radio

Ownership
- Owner: Plymouth Rock Broadcasting Co., Inc.
- Sister stations: WPLM-FM

History
- First air date: August 8, 1955
- Call sign meaning: Plymouth

Technical information
- Licensing authority: FCC
- Facility ID: 52837
- Class: B
- Power: 5,000 watts
- Transmitter coordinates: 41°58′5.37″N 70°42′4.13″W

Links
- Public license information: Public file; LMS
- Website: wplmamamericashometownradio.com

WPLM (1390 AM) is a commercial radio station licensed to Plymouth, Massachusetts, United States. WPLM broadcasts to the South Shore and Cape Cod areas. The station is owned by Plymouth Rock Broadcasting Co., Inc. WPLM broadcasts a talk radio format.

== History ==
Logo as a business talk station

WPLM signed on August 8, 1955, with WPLM-FM (99.1) being added on June 25, 1961. The two stations simulcast all programming from the FM station's launch until October 1997, when the station began to carry the Eastern Massachusetts Financial News Network, based out of WADN (1120 AM, now WBNW), in morning drive. In May 1999, WPLM's simulcast of WBNW was expanded to run from 6 a.m. to 6 p.m. On January 15, 2015, WPLM returned to a full simulcast with WPLM-FM.

For much of its history, WPLM was branded as "The radio voice of America's Hometown, Cape Cod and the Islands."

WPLM went silent on June 7, 2018. It resumed operations on June 6, 2019. The station again went off the air January 7, 2024, after part of its transmitter burned out. The station has applied to broadcast on the same tower its FM sister station is using but at a reduced power of 500 watts by day and 25 watts at night. It returned to the air on December 12, 2024.
