= Trevor Welch =

Irish sports commentator

- Occupation: Sports commentator

Trevor Welch is an Irish sports commentator who worked for TV3 from 1998 until 2012.

He covered TV3's live coverage of the UEFA Champions League and the UEFA Europa League and up to April 2012 he was the regular presenter of the sports news on TV3 News. From 1998 until 2009 he was the main presenter of nightly sports programme Sports Tonight until it was cancelled due to budget cuts.

Welch also hosted sports gameshow A Game of Two Halves which broadcast for one series in 1999 and League of Ireland highlights show Eircom League Weekly from 2002 to 2007.

As of 2020, he is a presenter on the Cork-based radio station Cork's 96FM.

He has commentated on League of Ireland matches for LOI TV.
