= George Hook =

Irish broadcaster and journalist

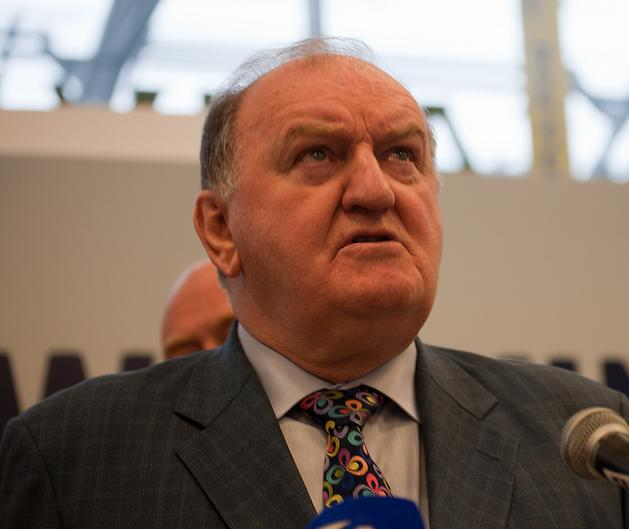
- George Hook in 2011
- Born: 19 May 1941 (age 84); Cork, Ireland
- Education: Rathmines College of Commerce, Dublin Institute of Technology
- Occupations: Journalist and Radio Broadcaster
- Height: 1.90 m (6 ft 3 in)
- Spouse: Ingrid Hook
- Children: 3

George Hook (born 19 May 1941) is an Irish broadcaster, journalist and rugby union pundit. He formerly hosted The Right Hook and High Noon on the Irish radio station Newstalk.

He had a career as a rugby union coach and businessman, before becoming a rugby pundit on RTÉ Television in 1997. He has also made other TV appearances, such as judging on Jigs & Reels and coaching on Celebrity Bainisteoir.

== Early life ==
Hook grew up in the Albert Road area of Cork. He attended Presentation Brothers College, a rugby union stronghold. Subsequently, he attended Rathmines College of Commerce.

== Career ==
Hook has had a number of jobs, beginning as a temporary clerk for CIÉ, and later becoming a travelling salesman for the Burroughs Corporation (now Unisys). He ran a catering business for over twenty years. He coached London Irish and Connacht as well as the United States national team in the 1987 Rugby World Cup.

The Right Hook, Hook's radio show on Newstalk, was a popular late afternoon to early evening drive-time programme. His wife, "the lovely Ingrid", was regularly subjected to having her intimate details discussed and dissected on air by Hook.

Hook appeared as a rugby pundit on RTÉ on a regular basis, most frequently with presenter Tom McGurk and fellow pundit Brent Pope, and appeared as a judge on RTÉ celebrity dancing show Jigs & Reels. He has also been parodied in The State of Us. In 2005, he published an autobiography, "Time Added On". The book described his years involved in business and the failure of this career path.

On 26 January 2014, Hook announced that he would retire from Newstalk in 2016 and television punditry after the 2015 Rugby World Cup but RTÉ lost the right for Irish broadcasting to TV3. On 13 February 2015, he reversed his decision to retire from television punditry. However, on 17 March the same year, Hook announced that he would retire from television punditry saying he would never watch the RTÉ rugby panel again.

=== Suspension ===
In September 2017 he was suspended by Newstalk for comments about rape. In October 2017, Newstalk announced that Ciara Kelly was taking over his lunchtime radio slot.

== Voluntary work ==
In 2009, he visited Haiti where he organised a recruitment drive to get volunteers to go there on a house building week.

The next day a magnitude 7.0 M_{w} earthquake struck Haiti. After the earthquake Hook was heard to say: "It is a godforsaken place. God has literally forsaken it." Following the January 2010 earthquake. Hook urged his radio listeners to donate money.

Hook is also the patron of Comber Foundation, an Irish charity working in Romania since 1991, of which his daughter Michelle McGill is a trustee. The charity provides homes in the community for adults with disabilities who grew up in institutions and orphanages

== Views ==
Politically, Hook is a longtime supporter of Fine Gael, and spoken at party events, he frequently identifying himself on The Right Hook as being "an old Blueshirt".

In 2010, as part of the Catholic Church's "Year for Priests" celebration, he contributed to a DVD, In Praise of Priests, featuring interviews with various people expressing admiration for their favourite priest.

== Bibliography ==
- Hook, George Time Added On, Penguin Ireland, 2005; ISBN 1-84488-076-1
