= Same Oul' Town =

Studio album by The Saw Doctors
- Released: 1996 (Ireland)
- Genre: Rock
- Length: 48:25
- Label: Shamtown Records

The Saw Doctors chronology
All The Way From Tuam (1992)	Same Oul' Town (1996)	Songs From Sun Street (1998)

Same Oul' Town is the third studio album by Irish rock band The Saw Doctors. The CD was released on The Saw Doctors' own record label, Shamtown Records and has the catalogue number of SAWDOC004CD.

== Track listing ==
1. "All The One"
2. "Same Oul Town"
3. "To Win Just Once"
4. "Everyday"
5. "World Of Good"
6. "Back To Tuam"
7. "Mercy Gates"
8. "Macnas Parade"
9. "Share The Darkness"
10. "I Want You More"
11. "All Over Now"
12. "Clare Island"

== Personnel ==
=== Band ===
- Davy Carton: Vocals, Guitar
- Leo Moran: Guitar, Backing Vocals
- John Donnelly Drums, Percussion, Vocals
- Pearse Doherty: Bass guitar, Vocals, Whistle
- Derek Murray: Keyboards, Accordion, Guitar, Mandolin, Banjo

=== Guest musicians ===
- Joe Bernie: Saxophone
- Pat Short: Saxophone
- Jim Higgins: Piano
- Anthony Thistlethwaite: Mandolin
- Peter Ray : Vocals
- Brid Dooley: Vocals
- Padraig Stevens: Percussion
- John Moran: Finger Clicks
- Michael Hegarty: Electric Triangle
