= Villains? =

Studio album by The Saw Doctors
- Released: 2002 (Ireland)
- Genre: Rock
- Length: 38:38
- Label: Shamtown Records

The Saw Doctors chronology
| Songs from Sun Street (1998) | Villains? (2002) | Play It Again, Sham! (2002) |

Villains? is the fifth studio album by Irish rock band The Saw Doctors. The CD was released on The Saw Doctors' own record label, Shamtown Records, and has the catalogue number of SAWDOC008CD. The album was dedicated to Paul Cunniffe, who had co-written several songs for the band.

== Track listing ==
1. "Villains" (Leo Moran) - 5:05
2. "This Is Me" (Davy Carton) - 2:50
3. "Still Afraid of the Dark" (Moran/Carton) - 4:00
4. "Happy Days" (Pearse Doherty) - 3:22
5. "Bound to the Peace" (Moran/Carton) - 3:28
6. "Darkwind" (Moran/Carton) - 3:28
7. "Always Gives Me More" (Doherty/Derek Murray) - 2:38
8. "I Know I've Got Your Love" (Moran/Carton/Padraig Stevens) - 3:45
9. "Chips" (Moran/Carton/Stevens/Doherty) - 3:34
10. "DNA" (Doherty) - 2:58
11. "Still the Only One" (Stevens) - 3:25

== Personnel ==
=== Band ===
- Davy Carton: Vocals, guitar
- Leo Moran: Guitar, backing vocals
- Jim Higgins: Drums
- Pearse Doherty: Bass guitar, vocals
- Anthony Thistlethwaite: Saxophone
- Derek Murray: Keyboards

=== Guest musicians ===
- Danny Healy: Trumpet
- Marilyn O'Connor: Vocals
- Maureen Stevens: Vocals
- Padraig Stevens: Percussion
