= Martin Breheny =

Irish journalist and sportswriter

- Máirtín Mac an Bhreithiún
- Occupation: Journalist
- Years active: c. 1975–
- Employers: The Tuam Herald; The Irish Press; Irish Independent
- Works: Books on: John O'Leary (1997), Mick O'Dwyer (c. 2000), D. J. Carey (2013), Brian Cody
- Awards: "Sports Story of the Year" (2017); Hall of Fame (2020)

Martin Breheny is an Irish journalist and sportswriter from County Galway. He began his career at The Tuam Herald before moving to The Irish Press in 1979.

Breheny is former Gaelic games correspondent with the Irish Independent, for which he continues to write as of 2026.

== Early life ==
Breheny is from the north County Galway village of Kilkerrin. He played for, and later served as secretary of, his local Kilkerrin-Clonberne GAA club before he moved to Dublin in 1979.

Breheny spent four years working for The Tuam Herald before embarking on a 41-year national media career. At The Tuam Herald Breheny was a contemporary of Jim Carney and Michael Lyster.

== National career ==
Breheny began working for The Irish Press in 1979. He had retired as the Irish Independent's Gaelic games correspondent by the time of the COVID-19 pandemic; however, he continued to write for the paper.

Breheny has covered All-Ireland Finals in both football and hurling for many decades, attending his first final in 1971 (football) and his 100th in 2019 (football; drawn game). In 2020, he gave his favourite final in each code as 1998 (football) and 2009 (hurling).

He is a regular member of the All Star selection committees, first doing so in 1983.

Breheny helped write the autobiographies of footballers John O'Leary (published 1997) and Mick O'Dwyer (published c. 2000), and hurlers D. J. Carey (published 2013) and Brian Cody.

== Awards ==
Breheny won "Sports Story of the Year" at the 2017 NewsBrands Ireland Journalism awards.

He was inducted into the Hall of Fame in March 2020.
