= The Green and Red of Mayo =

1992 song by The Saw Doctors

Song by The Saw Doctors

from the album All The Way From Tuam
- Released: 1992
- Genre: Rock
- Length: 4:07
- Label: Shamtown Records
- Songwriters: Jarir Al-Majar, Leo Moran, Davy Carton
- Producer: Philip Tennant

The Green and Red of Mayo is a song by the Saw Doctors. It first appeared on the album All the Way from Tuam in 1992.

It is an unofficial anthem of the Mayo county football team, sung commonly at Mayo GAA matches, and is heavily associated with the county.

== See also ==
- Mayo GAA
- The Saw Doctors

== Legacy ==
In 2026, several Irish regional newspapers reported the registration of a ".ie" domain name based on the opening lyric of the song that reached the 63-character DNS label limit, the maximum length permitted for a single domain label under internet naming standards.
