= The Further Adventures of... The Saw Doctors =

The Further Adventures of...

Studio album by The Saw Doctors
- Released: 2010 (Ireland)
- Genre: Rock
- Label: Shamtown Records
- Producer: Phil Tennant

The Saw Doctors chronology
The Cure (2005)	The Further Adventures of... (2010)

The Further Adventures of The Saw Doctors is a 2010 album by Irish rock group the Saw Doctors. The band's seventh studio album, it marked five years since the release of their prior album, The Cure. It was released on 17 September 2010 in Ireland and on iTunes and was released on 27 September 2010 in the UK. It was sold on Amazon as part of a limited edition set including the CD plus a bonus DVD. The album reached number 58 in the UK Album Chart in its first week.

== Track listing ==
1. "Takin' The Train"
2. "Friday Town"
3. "Someone Loves You"
4. "Hazard"
5. "Indian Summer"
6. "Well Byes"
7. "Be Yourself"
8. "Last Call"
9. "As The Light Fades"
10. "Songs and Stars"
11. "Goodbye Again"

== Personnel ==
=== The Band ===
- Davy Carton – Vocals, Acoustic Guitar, 12 String Guitar, Electric Guitar, Piano, Backing Vocals
- Leo Moran – Electric Guitars, Glockenspiel, Backing Vocals
- Anthony Thistlethwaite – Bass guitar, Electric Mandolin, Backing Vocals
- Eimhin Cradock – Drums, Percussion, Backing Vocals
- Kevin Duffy – Keyboards, Backing Vocals

Ollie Jennings – Manager

=== Other ===
- The Mavron Quartet – Strings on Someone Loves You
- String arranged by Tim Lewis and Davy Carton
- Produced by Philip Tennant
- Engineered and Mixed by Adam Whittaker

== Chart positions ==
Chart (2010)	Peak position
Irish Independent Albums Chart	1
