= Tim Scanlan =

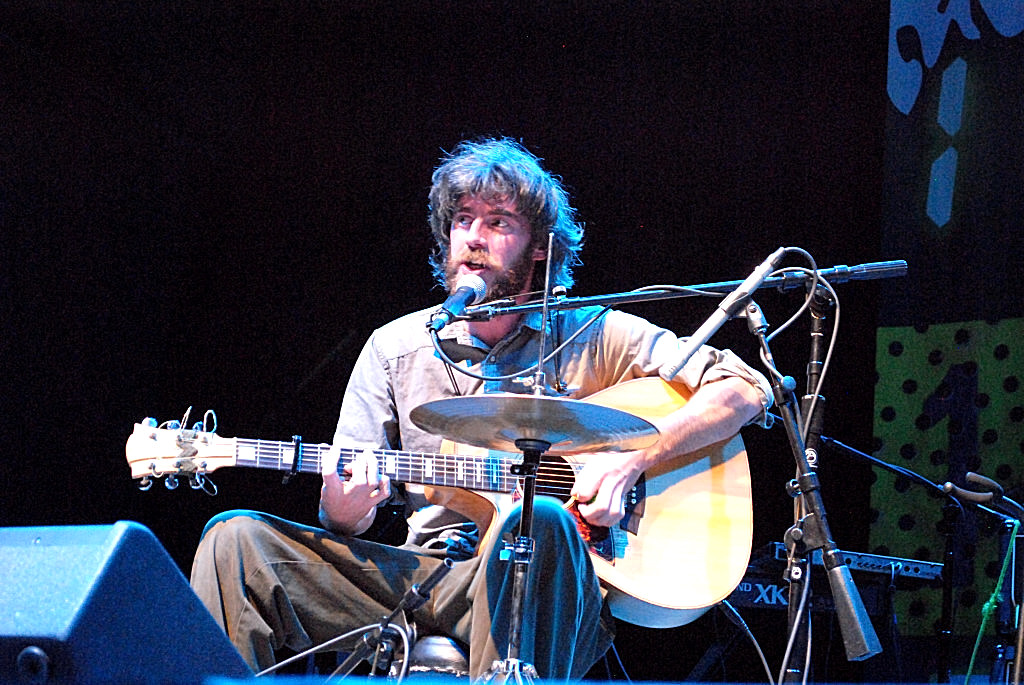
- Tim Scanlan photographed by Terri Taylor on 10 March 2013
- Born: 15 May 1979 (age 47)
- Known for: Musician / Multi-Instrumentalist
- Awards: 2017 Tamworth Country Music Festival Busking Competition winner, 2012 Anglo-Celt Street Seisiún Talent Competition Winner
- Website: timscanlanmusic.wixsite.com/home

Tim Scanlan is a musician from Melbourne, Australia who performs as a one-man band. This multi-instrumentalist simultaneously plays a harmonica, guitar and rattling shaker (left-handed), a bass drum or cajon with his right foot, and cymbals on a stand with his left foot while tapping his feet on a stomp box. He also sings occasionally. His unique style of music has been described as a blend of Celtic, Folk, Roots Music and Reggae.

== Early life ==
Scanlan was born on 15 May 1979.

== Achievements ==
- Winner of the 2017 Tamworth Country Music Festival Busking Competition
- Took second place at the 2012 Anglo-Celt Street Seisiún Talent Competition.
- Has performed in several countries, including Australia, the United States, Canada, Ireland and Japan.
- Records on the indie label Scanbait Records. His music is also featured on YouTube and SoundCloud.
- Featured as the main subject of over a dozen YouTube videos.

== Collaborations ==
Scanlan and Japanese percussionist, Toshi Bodhran, tour extensively in Japan and Australia. Together, they released the CD "Come n Take a Look".

Scanlan, along with Irishmen Aindrias de Staic and former Saw Doctors drummer, Éimhín Cradock, played together as the Gaelic hip-hop band, The Latchikós in 2013. They performed live at music festivals in Canada, Ireland and the United States. They also produced one 10-track CD.

== Discography ==
=== Albums ===
- Tim Scanlan – Japan Tour – 2013
- Come n Take a Look (with Toshi Bodhran) – 2013
- A Minor Key (4 track EP) – 2015
- Tim Scanlan & Friends – Live in Tokyo (with Mana Okubo & Rhys Crimmin) – 2016
