= St Patrick's College, Tuam =

Catholic boys' school in Ireland

Coordinates: 53.51217°N 8.84472°W

St Patrick's College (Irish: Coláiste Phadraig Naofa), known as Tuam Christian Brothers School until 1990, was a Roman Catholic secondary school for boys in Tuam, County Galway, Ireland.

The college was named after St Patrick, as the foundation stone of the school was laid on St Patrick's Day, 17 March 1860. The school was amalgamated with nearby St Jarlath's College in 2009, to form the new St Jarlath's College.

== History ==
St. Patrick's began life as Tuam Christian Brothers School (Tuam C.B.S.) in 1851, in a rented building at Prospect, off the old Ballygaddy Road. The building was owned by the Protestant Archbishop of Tuam. The first superior and principal was Brother Laurence Lowe. The school prospered until 1859, when in June of that year, the landlord refused to renew the lease.

The Bishop, Thomas Plunket, demanded vacant possession of the property, and on Wednesday, 1 June 1859, the sheriff, his bailiffs and a force of police attempted to take vacant possession of the school. Due to the endeavours of the local people, they did not succeed until 16 June. The brothers were then recalled to Dublin, and on the following night the premises was broken into, set alight, and burned to the ground.

The departure of the Brothers in 1859 created a grave problem for the town of Tuam. The people found themselves deprived of an education for their children, St Jarlath's being exclusively for boarders at that time. So, on 31 July 1859, Archbishop MacHale, who had first invited the Brothers to Tuam, called a meeting in the sacristy, at which it was decided to build a new school, for which the Archbishop donated a site on the Dublin Road.

On this site the new school was built, and opened in November 1861 with two brothers. The building housed both the primary and secondary schools for many years, as well as the Brothers' monastery. A separate primary school was built in the 1940s, allowing more space for the secondary school.

The school continued to operate here until 1980, when a new school and gymnasium were built on a site behind the old monastery. This school continued to be run by the Christian Brothers until 1990, when, due to a lack of vocations, the Brothers left Tuam. The school then came under the patronage of the Archbishop of Tuam.

== Sport ==
=== Gaelic football ===
Well-known for its local rivalry with St Jarlath's College, CBS made history when they defeated their long time enemies in the Connacht Colleges Senior Football Championship final on 16 March 1980. The victorious team won with a scoreline of 1-4 to 0-5 in Tuam Stadium.

Their second Senior Provincial Championship came in 1989. Having overcome St Jarlath's in the semi-final, CBS defeated four in a row Connacht Championship chasers St Mary's College, Galway in tough weather conditions on 19 March. The final scoreline read 0-6 to 0-4.

Their third and final victory came when St. Patrick's defeated Connacht Championship and Hogan Cup holders St Jarlath's in the final. St Patrick's won the game with a score of 0-14 to 1-7 on 12 March 1995 in Tuam Stadium.

Since St Patrick's and St Jarlath's have amalgamated, the New St Jarlath's College have won two Connacht Senior Championships in 2011 and 2012, and made a Hogan Cup Final appearance in 2011, but were defeated by St Colman's College, Newry by just one point on a scoreline of 2-10 to 0-15.

=== Basketball ===
St Pat's was also well known for its basketball, with achievements like winning the All Ireland Colleges Basketball Championship in 1974 and reaching the final in 1989. The Tuam side also won the All-Ireland Under-19 Championship in the first year of the competition in 1980 and also won the title the following year in 1981.

=== Match of the Century ===
On 29 May 1974, a unique fundraiser was held in aid of the Tuam CBS Building Fund in Tuam Stadium advertised as Match of the Century with an attendance of about 5000. This fundraiser was a game consisting of thirty minutes of soccer and thirty minutes of Gaelic football played between the Galway football team of the time, which would later reach the All-Ireland final that year but lose to Dublin, and a variety of distinguished soccer players including Eamonn Dunphy, Johnny Giles, Paddy Mulligan, Eoin Hand and Gerry Daly among others. In the end the soccer players walked out champions beating the Galway side with a scoreline of 3-11 to 3-13 in the match refereed by Jimmy Moran, father of The Saw Doctors band member Leo Moran. After the game, music was provided by the Presentation Convent and the Mercy Convent before a reception and social was held in the Hermitage Hotel.

== Notable alumni ==
- John Sheehy - British Colonial Official
- Mike Cooley - Trade Unionist and Engineer
- Derek Savage - All-Ireland medal winner with Galway in 1998 and 2001
- Jim Carney - Poet, journalist and presenter
- Tommy Varden - Entrepreneur and former Galway GAA sponsor
- Frank Stockwell - All-Ireland medal winner with Galway in 1956
- John Tobin - Former Galway Inter-County Footballer and Manager
- Finian McGrath - Politician
- Paul Cunniffe - Former member of punk band Blaze X
- Leo Moran - Member of The Saw Doctors
- Davy Carton - Member of The Saw Doctors
- Gay Mitchell - Former Galway Footballer
- P. J. Smyth - Former Galway Footballer and All Star Award Winner
