= Aindrias Stack =

Irish actor & musician (born 1977)

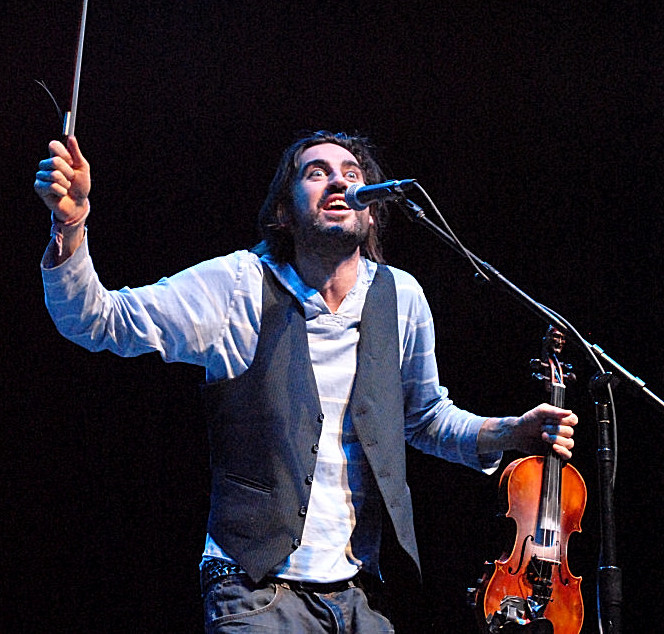
- de Staic in 2013
- Born: 9 November 1977 (age 49); Galway, Ireland
- Known for: Actor, musician, storyteller
- Awards: Best Actor, Best Solo Show, Most Outstanding Performer and more (see table)
- Website: aindrias.com

Aindrias Stack (aka Aindrias de Staic) (born 9 November 1977, Galway, Ireland) is an Irish actor and musician. He performs in both Irish and English. Stack is best known for his one man shows Around the World on 80 Quid, The Year I Got Younger, The Summer I Did the Leaving and The Man From Moogaga.

== Acting career ==
His first West End role was in Woody Sez, a show about the life and music of Woody Guthrie. His first lead role in a feature film was I Am Raftery – The Weaver of Words where he portrayed the blind 19th century itinerant Irish poet in the biographical movie.

Other film roles include Malarkey, The Year I Got Younger, Further We Search (directed by Darius Devas – 2009) and A Moment of Grace (directed by Dimitrios Pouliotis – 2010).

Irish television appearances include The Clinic on RTÉ and Craic de Staic on TG4. In 2013, he was one of three judges on TG4's Scór Encore, on which contestants perform traditional music, song or dance.

=== Awards ===
Year	Award	Event	Title	Result
2006	Best Actor	Geelong Shoot Out	Malarkey (directed by Joe Loh)	Winner
2007	Sweet Award	Edinburgh Fringe Festival	Around the World on 80 Quid	Winner
2008	Best Irish Short Documentary	Galway Film Fleadh	The Year I Got Younger (directed by Gen Bailey)	Winner
2008	Best Solo Show	New Zealand Fringe Festival	Around the World on 80 Quid	Winner
2008	Most Outstanding Performer	Dunedin Fringe Festival	Around the World on 80 Quid	Nominated
2008	Malcolm Hardee Award for Comic Originality	Edinburgh Fringe Festival	The Year I Got Younger	Nominated
2009	Official Selection	Galway Film Fleadh	Shtax: A Homecoming (directed by John Murphy)	Awarded
2009	Three Weeks Editors Award	Edinburgh Fringe Festival	The Summer I Did the Leaving	Winner
2010	Bright Spark Award	Tropfest	A Moment of Grace (directed by Dimitrios Pouliotis)	Winner
2014	Galway Water Best Comedy Award	Galway Fringe Festival	The Man From Moogaga	Winner
2018	Best Radio Comedy	Celtic Media Awards Llanelli 2018	The Man From Moogaga	Winner

=== Filmography ===
List of acting performances in film and television
Year	Title	Role	Notes	Source
2024	Blue Fiddle			
2012	Stranded	Vin	Short version of Wasteland	
2010	Songs for Amy	James the Chef		
2010	The Promotion	J.P.	Short	
2010	Wasteland	Vin		
2010	A Moment of Grace	Michael	Short	
2010	Craic de Staic	Himself	TV comedic documentary	
2010	I Am Raftery – The Weaver of Words	Raftery	Feature film	
2009	How Good Would It Be	Supporting Role	Feature film	
2009	Further We Search	Simon		
2009	Support Me Not	Nathan	Short	
2009	Nothing Personal	Fiddle Player		
2009	Shtax: A Homecoming	Himself	Documentary	
2008	The Year I Got Younger	Himself	Short	
2008	The Clinic	Tony the Busker	TV series – 4 episodes	
2006	Malarkey	Fiddle Player		

== Music career ==
After a sell-out run at the Edinburgh Festival Fringe in 2007, Stack returned to Galway to launch Latchico, the first recording featuring his music. Stack, along with Tim Scanlan and former Saw Doctors drummer, Éimhín Cradock make up a Gaelic gypsy hip-hop band, The Latchikós. They released their first single, "Off to Bondi Junction," and one 10-track CD, "Sugarbeat Sessions" in 2013. Aindrias and The Latchikos are popular internationally for their hybrid of Spanish Gypsy Music and Hip Hop.
