= The Cure (The Saw Doctors album) =

2005 studio album

Studio album by The Saw Doctors
- Released: 2005 (Ireland)
- Genre: Rock
- Length: 41:21
- Label: Shamtown Records

The Saw Doctors chronology
| New Year's Day (2005) | The Cure (2005) | The Further Adventures of... The Saw Doctors (2010) |

The Cure is the 6th studio recording release by Irish rock band The Saw Doctors. The CD was released on The Saw Doctor's own record label, Shamtown Records and has the catalogue number of SAWDOC013CD. All the songs on the album are original songs written by members of the band, except for Track 11, "Funny World", which is written by old friend Paul Cunniffe.

== Track listing ==
All songs written by Leo Moran / Davy Carton except as indicated.

1. "Out for a Smoke"
2. "Last Summer in New York"
3. "Addicted"
4. "Stars Over Cloughanover"
5. "If Only"
6. "Wisdom of Youth"
7. "Vulnerable"
8. "Me Without You"
9. "Going Home" (L. Moran / Carton / Padraig Stevens / Derek Murray)
10. "Your Guitar" (L. Moran / Carton / Jimmy Moran)
11. "Funny World" (Paul Cunniffe)
12. "I'll Say Goodnight"

== Personnel ==
=== Band ===
- Davy Carton: Vocals, Guitar
- Leo Moran: Guitar, Backing Vocals
- Fran Breen: Drums
- Anthony Thistlethwaite: Bass guitar, Harmonica, Saxophone
- Derek Murray: Keyboards

=== Guest musicians ===
- Nicola Geddes: Cello
- Kenneth Rice: Violin
- Giles Packham: Piano, Synthesizers, Programming
- Paul Barrett: Backing Vocals
- Jimmy Moran: Guitar
- Christopher Carton: Percussion
- Niall O'Grady: Guitar
- Eamonn Goggin: Bell, Shaker
