= All the Way from Tuam =

All The Way From Tuam

Studio album by The Saw Doctors
- Released: 1992 (Ireland)
- Genre: Rock
- Length: 48:43
- Label: Shamtown Records
- Producer: Philip Tennant

The Saw Doctors chronology
If This Is Rock and Roll, I Want My Old Job Back (1991)	All The Way From Tuam (1992)	Same Oul Town (1996)

All the Way from Tuam is the second studio album by Irish rock band The Saw Doctors. The CD was released on The Saw Doctors' own record label, Shamtown Records and has the catalogue number of SAWDOC002CD. It is named after the band's home town, Tuam.

== Track listing ==
All songs written by Leo Moran and Davy Carton except where indicated.

1. "The Green and Red of Mayo" (Jarir Al-Majar, Moran, Carton)
2. "You Got Me On the Run"
3. "Pied Piper"
4. "Me Heart Is Livin' in the Sixties Still" (Moran, Pearse Doherty, Carton, John Donnelly)
5. "Hay Wrap" (Moran, Carton, Doherty, Donnelly, John Burke)
6. "Wake Up Sleeping"
7. "Midnight Express" (Carton)
8. "Broke My Heart"
9. "Exhilarating Sadness"
10. "All the Way from Tuam"
11. "F.C.A."
12. "Music I Love" (Moran, Carton, Doherty, Donnelly)
13. "Yvonne" (Moran, Doherty, Carton, Donnelly)
14. "Never Mind the Strangers"

== Personnel ==
=== Band ===
- Davy Carton: vocals, guitar
- Leo Moran: guitar, backing vocals
- John Donnelly: drums, percussion, vocals
- Pearse Doherty: bass guitar, vocals
- Tony Lambert: keyboards, guitar, accordion, banjo, vocals
- John Burke: mandolin, guitar, vocals

=== Guest musicians ===
- James Barton: Violin
- Sharon McKinley: Cello
- Robin Stowell: Violin
- Anthony Thistlethwaite: Saxophone
- Glenn Thompson: Percussion
- Philip Tomkins: Viola
- Greg Haver: Percussion
- Geoff York: Viola
