= League Sunday =

- Genre: Sport
- Presented by: Michael Lyster; Marty Morrissey
- Country of origin: Ireland
- Original language: English
- No. of series: 2

Production
- Production locations: RTÉ Television Centre, Donnybrook, Dublin 4
- Camera setup: Multi-camera
- Running time: 60 minutes

Original release
- Network: RTÉ2
- Release: 13 February 2011 – present

Related
- Sunday Sport; The Sunday Game

League Sunday is an RTÉ2 Gaelic games television show hosted by Michael Lyster, featuring highlights from the National Football League and the National Hurling League. It began on 13 February 2011, at 8:00pm as a replacement highlights show for Sunday Sport.

== Analysts ==
- Seán Cavanagh
- Oisín McConville
- Colm O'Rourke
- Ken McGrath and Jackie Tyrrell
