= N17 =

N17 may refer to:

== Roads ==
- N17 road (Belgium), a National Road of Belgium
- Route nationale 17, in France
- N17 road (Ireland)
- N17 (South Africa)
- Nebraska Highway 17, in the United States

== Other uses ==
- N17 (band), an American industrial metal band
- N17 (Long Island bus)
- "N17" (song), a 1991 song by The Saw Doctors
- HMS Tarpon (N17), a submarine of the Royal Navy
- Nieuport 17, a French First World War fighter
- Nissan Almera (N17), a Japanese automobile
- Nitrogen-17, an isotope of nitrogen
- N17, a postcode district in the N postcode area
- A metonym for the Tottenham Hotspur Stadium, the home of North-London based football club Tottenham Hotspur.
