= Songs from Sun Street =

Songs From Sun Street

Studio album by The Saw Doctors
- Released: November 3, 1998
- Genre: Rock
- Length: 44:22
- Label: Shamtown/Paradigm

The Saw Doctors chronology
Sing A Powerful Song (1997)	Songs From Sun Street (1998)	Villains? (2002)

Professional ratings
Review scores
Source	Rating
Allmusic	link

Songs From Sun Street is the 1998 studio album release of the Irish rock band, The Saw Doctors. The album was not only released on CD, but audio cassette and vinyl as well. It was released on The Saw Doctors' own record label, Shamtown Records as well as Paradigm Records.

The photo on the front cover was taken by Martin Parr on the beach at Weymouth in Dorset on the south coast of England in 1996.

== Track listing ==
1. "Good News" (Carton, Doherty, Moran, Stevens) – 3:04
2. "Sugartown" (Carton, Moran, Stevens) – 3:13
3. "Galway and Mayo" (Moran) – 3:33
4. "Carry Me Away" (Carton, Moran) – 4:10
5. "Heading for the Sunshine" (Carton, Moran) – 2:36
6. "Catríona Tells Lies" (Carton, Doherty, Donnelly) – 2:37
7. "Blah, Blah, Blah" (Carton, Doherty, Moran) – 2:35
8. "D'Ya Wanna Hear My Guitar?" (Carton, Moran) – 2:50
9. "Joyce Country Céilí Band" (Carton, Doherty, Moran) – 3:47
10. "High Nellie" (Carton, Moran, Stevens) – 1:48
11. "Best of Friends" (Doherty) – 2:35
12. "Will It Ever Stop Raining?" (Carton, Doherty, Moran, Murray) – 2:48
13. "Tommy K." (Carton, Moran, Stevens) – 2:43
14. "Away With the Fairies" (Carton, Doherty, Moran) – 3:23
15. "I'll Be on My Way" (Carton, Moran) – 3:06
  - "Apples, Sweets or Chocolate" (hidden track from 7:58 to 11:40)

== Band members ==
- Davy Carton: Vocals, guitar, array mbira
- Leo Moran: Vocals, guitar
- Pearse Doherty: Vocals, bass
- John Donnelly: Drums, vocals
- Derek Murray: Keyboards, accordion, guitar
