= I Used to Love Her =

I Used to Love Her may refer to these songs:

- "I Used to Love H.E.R." by Common Sense
- "I Useta Lover" by The Saw Doctors
- "Used to Love Her" by Guns N' Roses
- "Used to Love Her", a song by Jay Sean on the album My Own Way
