= I Useta Lover =

- Cassette sleeve

Single by The Saw Doctors

from the album If This Is Rock and Roll, I Want My Old Job Back
- B-side: "Captain Joe Fiddle's"
- Released: July 28, 1990
- Studio: Loco Studio, Wales
- Genre: Celtic rock; folk rock
- Label: Solid Records
- Songwriter(s): Davy Carton, Leo Moran, Paul Cunniffe
- Producer(s): Phil Tennant

The Saw Doctors singles chronology
"N17" (1989)	"I Useta Lover" (1990)	"Presentation Boarder" (1990)

"I Useta Lover" (/ˈjuːstə/, eye dialect of "I used to love her") is a 1990 song by Irish rock group The Saw Doctors. It is the second single off the If This Is Rock and Roll, I Want My Old Job Back album. It stayed at the #1 position in the Irish chart for nine weeks and became one of the best-selling singles of all time in the country. A similar clerically influenced message is seen in other Saw Doctors songs, notably "Bless Me Father" and "Tommy K".

The chorus of the song was originally taken from a song of the same name which was performed by Davy Carton's first band, Blaze X. The original song had been written by Paul Cunniffe. The Blaze X version of the song appears as a B-side on some versions of the single.
