= The Cabin Collective =

Irish country-rock band

- Origin: Tuam, County Galway, Ireland
- Genres: Rock, country
- Years active: 2013–14
- Members: Keith Mullins; Noelie McDonnell; Larry Kelly; Dave Clancy; Éimhín Cradock; Michael Coen; Rickie O'Neill; Leo Moran; Anthony Thistlethwaite
- Website: www.thecabincollective.com

The Cabin Collective was an Irish country-rock supergroup formed in Tuam, County Galway in 2013. The band, which took its name from the Scandinavian-style log cabin where they rehearsed, was formed as a result of fellow Tuam band The Saw Doctors taking a temporary break. During that time, three members of the Saw Doctors, Leo Moran, Rickie O'Neill, and Anthony Thistlethwaite, joined with fellow Galway musicians (including Keith Mullins and Noelie McDonnell, both regular support acts of the Saw Doctors, and former Saw Doctors drummer Eímhín Cradock).

The band played their debut live gig on 26 April 2013, at An Taibhdhearc as part of the Cúirt Festival. Earlier that week, they appeared on The Late Late Show, playing an updated version of Keith Mullins' song "Lines Are Fading".

The band released their second single Marrakech on 1 November 2013.
