= Michael D =

Michael D may refer to:

- Mike D (born 1965), founding member of the Beastie Boys
- Michael D. Higgins (born 1941), ninth President of Ireland
- "Michael D Rocking in the Dáil", a song about Michael D. Higgins by The Saw Doctors
