= Richard Kelly (The Tuam Herald) =

Irish editor and newspaper proprietor

- Born: 1810
- Died: 1884 (aged 73–74)
- Occupation: Journalist

Richard John Kelly (1810–1884) was an Irish journalist and the founder of The Tuam Herald.

Kelly was a native of Loughrea, County Galway, and launched The Tuam Herald newspaper on 13 May 1837; it has been in continuous publication ever since. He was the proprietor and editor until succeeded by his son, Jasper, who was a journalist. Jasper died in his thirties, leaving a young family, and Richard resumed management of the paper on behalf of his grandchildren.
