= Jim Carney (poet) =

Irish poet and journalist (born 1950)

- Born: James Carney; 21 February 1950 (age 76); Milltown, County Galway, Ireland
- Education: Tuam CBS
- Occupations: Sports broadcaster; journalist
- Notable credit: The Sunday Game

Jim Carney is an Irish poet, journalist, and former presenter, best known for The Sunday Game.

A native of Parkroe, Milltown, Tuam, and a son of Thomas Carney, he was educated at Milltown National School and Tuam CBS. He is a member of the Tuam Theatre Guild and a journalist with The Tuam Herald, where he has worked alongside subsequent RTÉ western editor Jim Fahy. Carney was later appointed as a journalist and broadcaster with Raidió Teilifís Éireann (RTÉ), becoming the first presenter of the now landmark Gaelic games show The Sunday Game in 1979.

Preferring to be behind the camera, Carney moved into commentary after two seasons and remained a commentator and reporter for The Sunday Game until 2010, also working on the channel's live All-Ireland Hurling and Football Finals coverage as a reporter and interviewer, plus taking extra duties when regular-season live coverage was introduced in 1995.

During this time, Carney also doubled as editor of The Tuam Herald for a period in the 1990s and served as sports editor from 1985 up to his retirement in 2015. Since then, he writes a weekly sports column for the same newspaper.

In 1971, he published his first book, a collection of poems titled Echoes from a Darkened Alley. Carney played a key role in the management team for his club Milltown when they won their second and last Galway Senior Football Championship in 1981.

In 2020, Carney was presented with the Services to Sport Award by the Galway Sports Stars Awards.

== Bibliography ==
- Echoes from a Darkened Alley, 1971 (poetry)

== Sources ==
- Galway Authors, Helen Maher, 1976
