= Paul Cunniffe =

- Paul Cunniffe in London

Background information
- Born: 23 June 1961; Cambridge, England
- Died: 11 August 2001 (aged 40) Whitechapel, London, England
- Genres: Rock; Punk; Folk
- Occupations: Musician, songwriter
- Instrument: Vocals
- Years active: 1979–2001
- Formerly of: Blaze X, The Saw Doctors, Tuatha

Paul Cunniffe (23 June 1961 – 11 August 2001) was a British-born, Irish singer-songwriter. He fronted the 1980s punk band Blaze X.

== Early life and career ==
Cunniffe was born in Cambridge, England, and then lived in Ellesmere Port, but moved back to his family's hometown of Tuam in Ireland at the age of 14. In Tuam CBS he formed Blaze X with friends Paul Ralph, Davy Carton and Ja Keating.

After Blaze X split, he moved to London. He began to write songs on his own, and play on the Irish pub scene around the capital. He won the London Pub Entertainer of the Year award in 1996. He went on to form a short-lived band with a group of friends, naming themselves Tuatha, a reflection of Paul's time in Ireland. With only a small number of well-received gigs under their belt, they disbanded and Paul went on to more appearances on the London Irish pub and club circuit, initially appearing with Chris Nash (whistle and bodhran player) in a number of live performances before his return as a solo artist.

He wrote the first version of the Saw Doctors number 1 single, "I Useta Lover". He also wrote the track "Funny World" which is covered by the Saw Doctors on their album The Cure.

Following his death, an album of his songs entitled Excuse My Accent was released to critical acclaim. Many songs on this album evoke a sadness which seems to be in Paul's life. In the documentary, Man of Music, Heart of Gold, Kenny Ralph describes him as having frailty in life, similar to the life of Nick Drake. Others, such as Sunshine, suggest otherwise; Sunshine, lights up a cloudy day, moonlight helps me to find my way. You can't beat the feeling, when you've made it on your own . Dreams is considered the song which most aptly displays Paul's fine talent for words and the English language. There were only 500 copies of this album pressed. A catalogue of unreleased songs may be released at some point in the future.

There still exist rehearsal recordings of Paul with Tuatha, which may one day come to light. They include versions of "Taking The Easy Way Out", "Excuse My Accent", "Courting In The Kitchen", and The Saw Doctors' hit, "N17". In keeping with Paul's sense of humour, these sessions were recorded in a hall attached to a Catholic convent in Roehampton, South West London.

Paul left behind his partner Jo and three children.

A no-budget documentary about his music entitled Man of Music, Heart Of Gold was shown to a packed audience in his hometown of Tuam on 19 August 2007. The film had its Galway premiere on 6 December 2007 in Monroe's Tavern.

== Death ==
Paul died in suspicious circumstances, following a fall, in Whitechapel, east London on 11 August 2001. In January 2010, The Guardian claimed that Paul fell from the balcony of Paul Roundhill's flat, and that the circumstances surrounding the fall have never been discovered.

== Discography ==
- Friends, Demos & B-Sides (1994, Saw Doctors compilation - Paul contributed "Everybody Dreams")
- Excuse My Accent (2003, posthumous album)

== See also ==
- Blaze X
- The Saw Doctors
- List of unsolved deaths
