= The Sunday Game =

Gaelic games television programme

- Presented by: Joanne Cantwell (live broadcasts); Jacqui Hurley (highlights)
- Starring: Hurling analysts: Donal Óg Cusack; Michael Duignan; Cyril Farrell; Ger Loughnane; Tomás Mulcahy; Dónal O'Grady; Liam Sheedy; Joe Canning; Football analysts: Tomás Ó Sé; Ciarán Whelan; Colm Cooper; Peter Canavan; Paul Flynn; Lee Keegan; David Tubridy; Enda McGinley; Brian Fenton
- Narrated by: Commentators: Ger Canning; Marty Morrissey; Darragh Maloney; Jim Carney; Éamonn Fitzmaurice
- Country of origin: Ireland

Production
- Running time: Variable

Original release
- Network: RTÉ2
- Release: 8 July 1979 – present

Related
- League Sunday; Sports Stadium; Up for the Match

The Sunday Game is RTÉ's main Gaelic games television programme. It is shown on RTÉ2 every Sunday during the Football Championship and Hurling Championship seasons. It is one of RTÉ2's longest-running shows, having been on air since 1979, one year after the channel first began broadcasting. It celebrated its 30th season in 2008.

== Gaelic games broadcasting ==
=== Early years ===
Gaelic football and hurling have always been at the heart of broadcasting in Ireland from its earliest days. 2RN, Ireland's first radio broadcasting station, was established on 1 January 1926 and, from the outset, sports coverage, albeit infrequent, was a feature of the schedules. Early broadcasts consisted of team announcements and short reports on events of interest.

2RN, however, recorded a broadcasting first on 29 August 1926. On that day former hurler and renowned Gaelic games journalist, P. D. Mehigan, carried a live commentary of Kilkenny's All-Ireland hurling semi-final victory over Galway. It was the first live radio broadcast of a field game outside of the United States.

When Telefís Éireann was established on 31 December 1961, the new television station became interested in the broadcasting of the national games. The Gaelic Athletic Association, however, were wary the live television coverage would result in lower attendances at games. Because of this, the association restricted annual coverage of its games to the All-Ireland hurling and football finals, the two All-Ireland football semi-finals and the two Railway Cup finals.

The first time that Gaelic games were seen on Irish television was on 17 March 1962 when Telefís Éireann carried live coverage of the Railway Cup hurling final between Munster and Leinster. The football decider followed this. Before then highlights of games were shown on cinema newsreels filmed by the National Film Institute (now the IFI), while highlights of the 1959 All-Ireland hurling final were broadcast by the BBC, with Kenneth Wolstenholme commentating. Since 1962, however, the broadcasting of Gaelic games, albeit limited, became a key part of the new television station's schedule. On 5 September 1971 history was made again when Tipperary's defeat of Kilkenny in the All-Ireland final was the first game to be broadcast in colour.

=== The Sunday Game ===
This logo, used for the 2004 season, was replaced with the RTÉ Sport corporate style logo in 2005.

The first edition of The Sunday Game was broadcast on RTÉ2 on Sunday, 8 July 1979. Introduced by Jim Carney, it showed only one match; the Munster hurling final between Cork and Limerick; Cork won 2–14 to 0–9. Bill O'Herlihy also co-presented the first edition of The Sunday Game with Jim Carney. For the early years financial and logistical reasons restricted the programme to featuring just one full championship game and discussion about it. The show, however, soon expanded featuring coverage of one or more of the day's main championship games, followed by extended highlights of the other major games of the day. This format still continues.

The Sunday Game was only a few weeks old when it courted its first controversy. On 29 July 1979 the programme showed the Leinster football final between Dublin and Offaly. Dublin narrowly won the game, however, Jimmy Keaveney was sent off for a foul on Offaly's Ollie Minnock. In the discussion about the game analyst Liz Howard put forward the view that the sending off was very harsh. The following day the Irish Press newspaper carried the headline: 'TV personality supports Jimmy Keaveney' on the front page. Howard subsequently attended a Leinster Council disciplinary committee meeting and spoke on Keaveney's behalf, however, he received a one-month suspension.

For most of the 1980s, RTÉ was still restricted to just showing live coverage of the All-Ireland finals and semi-finals in both hurling and football. This changed in 1989 when the Munster hurling final between Tipperary and Waterford was broadcast live for the first time. Two years later, the third replay of the Leinster Football first round tie between Dublin and Meath was shown live on a Saturday afternoon due to a Croke Park sellout. Since 1995 RTÉ started broadcasting live games every weekend of the championship season under "The Sunday Game Live" banner. These days, the programme usually contains live coverage of two games. In 2007 The Sunday Game broadcast 50 live championship games. In 2008 the programme broadcast 40 live championship games due to the fact that rival broadcaster, TV3, was granted the rights to show live championship games for the first time ever.

The Sunday Game programme only covers the championship season from April to July. RTÉ also airs one National League match each weekend, with most of the league games are screened on TG4, while Sunday Sport on RTÉ Two provides highlights of some of these games. When a hurling or football game is shown live on Saturday or Monday – the latter becoming more common during Summer Bank Holiday weekends – the appropriately customised title The Saturday Game or The Monday Game is used. Previously The Game on Monday, a second selection of highlights, had also been aired, before being dropped in 2000. Live coverage of Championship matches in the UK on Premier Sports will use the RTÉ feed and until 2014 TV3's coverage.

Aside from the two senior championships, The Sunday Game Live previously covered the finals of four other championships: the All-Ireland Minor Football Championship and the All-Ireland Minor Hurling Championship in 2014 these rights went to TG4. RTÉ still shows the Senior, Intermediate and Junior All-Ireland Camogie Championship finals and has in recent seasons expanded its coverage to show the Quarter and Semi Finals of the senior championship. For the minor (under-18) matches, the commentary is traditionally in the Irish language and was performed by Micheal O Sé. The All-Ireland Ladies Football Championship senior and junior finals were also formerly covered, but are now shown on TG4 as part of a title sponsorship deal.

The 18 July 2010 episode was a special edition that had an audience of special guests to discuss.

An important development in 2014 was the live broadcast throughout the world of championship football and hurling matches by Sky Sports. Following negotiations as part of the GAA's media rights agreement, Sky and the GAA announced a mutual agreement to end their broadcast partnership in October 2022.

== Presenters, pundits and commentators ==
The Sunday Game's first edition was presented by Galway-based print journalist Jim Carney. External commitments, however, resulted in him stepping aside as presenter the following year. Former Dublin hurler, footballer, referee and sports journalist Seán Óg Ó Ceallacháin took over in 1980. He remained at the helm as presenter for two seasons before being replaced by Carney once again.

Michael Lyster replaced Carney in 1984 as part of a revamp of the show, coinciding with the centenary year of the GAA. When the show later expanded to feature live games, Lyster presented both The Sunday Game Live and The Sunday Game's highlights programme later the same evening. Both shows were presented from the RTÉ Television Centre, however, a further expansion of the programme in 2004 saw Lyster presenting The Sunday Game Live from the venue of the big match. Because of this former Kerry footballer and analyst Pat Spillane took over as presenter of the Sunday night highlights show. From the 2009 season Des Cahill replaced Spillane as host of the Sunday night highlights programme. In October 2022, Cahill announced that he would be stepping down from his role as host after 15 seasons of hosting. Jacqui Hurley was announced as Cahill's successor in January 2023.

In the early years, the programme's chief commentator was Michael O'Hehir, however, he only provided commentary for the senior All-Ireland finals. Mick Dunne, Micheál Ó Muircheartaigh, Jim Carney and Seán Óg Ó Ceallacháin all served as part of the commentary team in the early years. In 1980, Ger Canning joined the commentary team, becoming the programme's chief commentator following O'Hehir's retirement due to illness in time for the All-Ireland finals of 1985. He has commentated on every senior All-Ireland final since then, with Mícheál Ó Sé providing commentary in the Irish language on all All-Ireland semi-finals and finals in both codes in the minor grade. In the late 1980s, Marty Morrissey became the latest addition to The Sunday Game’s commentary team. He frequently commentates on provincial finals and All-Ireland semi-finals and has commentated on the All Ireland Hurling finals of 2017, 2018 and 2025 for RTÉ TV. An expansion of the programme in the 2000s (decade) saw Darragh Maloney become the latest member of the commentary team.

During the early and mid 1990s, Anne Cassin was the first women reporter and presenter.

The Sunday Game has always shown an innovative approach in its use of match analysts. In its very first season the makers of the programme made the brave decision to include Liz Howard as one of their main analysts. Howard was an All-Ireland camogie winner who was the daughter of Garrett Howard, one of Limerick's all-time hurling greats. Other analysts during the programme's first season included Enda Colleran, a former Galway footballer, and Dave Weldrick, trainer of the Thomond College team that won the All-Ireland club football title.

Throughout the years The Sunday Game has featured many of hurling and football's greatest players as analysts and pundits. These include:

Hurling: Jimmy Barry-Murphy, Eddie Brennan, Jimmy Brohan, D. J. Carey, Éamonn Cregan, Anthony Daly, John Doyle, Michael Duignan, Cyril Farrell, Davy Fitzgerald, Paul Flynn, Pete Finnerty, Pat Hartigan, Pat Henderson, Liam Griffin, Thomas Ryan, Eddie Keher, Phil 'Fan' Larkin, Ger Loughnane, Tomás Mulcahy, Larry O'Gorman, Dónal O'Grady, Declan Ruth, Henry Shefflin.

Football: Kevin Armstrong, Joe Brolly, Martin Carney, Enda Colleran, Paul Curran, Tony Davis, Seán Flanagan, Coman Goggins, Kevin Heffernan, Joe Lennon, Tommy Lyons, Jim McDonnell, Kevin McStay, Mick O'Connell, Mick O'Dwyer, Seán O'Neill, Anthony Tohill, Dave Weldrick, Eamon Young, Colm O'Rourke, Dessie Dolan, Lee Keegan, Michael Murphy

=== Former presenters ===
Presenter	Years
Jim Carney	1979, 1982–83
Bill O'Herlihy	1979
Seán Óg Ó Ceallacháin	1980–81
Michael Lyster	1984–2018
Pat Spillane	2004–08
Des Cahill	2009–2022

== Theme music ==
"Jägerlatein"
From The Sunday Game (2008)

For the 2004 season of the programme, RTÉ replaced the long-standing theme tune of The Sunday Game, Jägerlatein, composed by James Last, with a completely different composition. This was met with much comment (RTÉ had previously re-arranged the theme, then reverted to the original), and was likened to other iconic themes like the ones from Match of the Day, Grandstand, Test Match Special, Ski Sunday and Hockey Night in Canada being replaced. The new theme was used through to 2006 and was then replaced by another different theme in 2007. On 10 May 2008, RTÉ announced that the original theme would return, with a new arrangement, for the 2008 season.

This was also the theme song for Israel's Mabat Sport program.

== Episodes ==
1. The Munster Hurling Final (8 July 1979)
2. Highlights of the Leinster Hurling Final (15 July 1979)
3. The Hurling Final (22 July 1979)
4. Dublin v Offaly (29 July 1979)
5. All Ireland Hurling Semi-Final (5 August 1979)
6. Kerry v Monaghan (12 August 1979)
7. Dublin v Roscommon (19 August 1979)
8. Galway v Kilkenny (2 September 1979)
9. Dublin v Kerry (16 September 1979)
10. Wexford v Kilkenny (15 June 1980)
11. Cork v Tipperary (22 June 1980)
12. Kildare v Offaly (29 June 1980)
13. Kerry v Cork (6 July 1980)
14. The Connacht Football Final (13 July 1980)
15. Tyrone v Armagh (20 July 1980)
16. Dublin v Offaly (27 July 1980)
17. Offaly v Galway (3 August 1980)
18. Roscommon v Armagh (10 August 1980)
19. Kerry v Offaly (24 August 1980)
20. All Ireland Hurling Finals (7 September 1980)
21. All-lreland Football Finals (21 September 1980)
22. Tipperary v Limerick (7 June 1981)
23. Cork v Clare (14 June 1981)
24. Kilkenny v Wexford (21 June 1981)
25. Football and Tennis (28 June 1981)
26. The Munster Hurling Final (5 July 1981)
27. Sligo v Mayo (12 July 1981)
28. Ulster Senior Football Championship Final (19 July 1981)
29. Offaly v Laois (26 July 1981)
30. Galway v Limerick (2 August 1981)
31. Kerry v Mayo (9 August 1981)
32. Down v Offaly (23 August 1981)
33. Galway v Offaly (6 September 1981)
34. Kerry v Offaly (20 September 1981)
35. Offaly v Wexford (30 May 1982)
36. Dublin v Longford (6 June 1982)
37. Limerick v Waterford (13 June 1982)
38. Cork v Clare (20 June 1982)
39. Leinster Senior Football Semi Final (27 June 1982)
40. Hurling Semi Final (4 July 1982)
41. Galway v Mayo and Laois v Offaly (11 July 1982)
42. Cork v Waterford and Fermanagh v Armagh (18 July 1982)
43. Leinster Hurling Final (25 July 1982)
44. Leinster Football Final at Croke Park and the Munster Football Final replay from Killarnev (1 August 1982)
45. Kilkenny v Galway (8 August 1982)
46. Kerry v Armagh (15 August 1982)
47. Galway v Offaly (22 August 1982)
48. Kilkenny v Cork (5 September 1982)
49. Offaly v Kerry (19 September 1982)
50. Clare v Tipperary (29 May 1983)
51. Monaghan v Antrim (5 June 1983)
52. Cork v Limerick and Dublin v Meath (12 June 1983)
53. A Mix of Golf and Gaelic Games (19 June 1983)
54. A Great Reputation for Limerick and Cork (26 June 1983)
55. Leinster Senior Football Championship (3 July 1983)
56. Hurling Matches (10 July 1983)
57. Mayo v Galway and Cork v Kerry (17 July 1983)
58. Donegal v Cavan (24 July 1983)
59. Offaly v Dublin (31 July 1983)
60. Cork v Galway (7 August 1983)
61. Galway v Donegal (14 August 1983)
62. Cork v Dublin (21 August 1983)
63. The Two Hurling Finals (4 September 1983)
64. Dublin v Galway (18 September 1983)
65. Kerry v Dublin (25 September 1983)
66. The GAA Centenary Cup (13 May 1984)
67. The GAA Centenary Cup (20 May 1984)
68. Kilkenny v Laois (27 May 1984)
69. Another Look at the Archives (3 June 1984)
70. Dublin v Wexford (10 June 1984)
71. Cork v Offaly (2 September 1984)
72. Dublin v Kerry (16 September 1984)
73. Dublin v Tipperary (23 September 1984)
74. Kerry's Football Triumphs of the 1950s and the 1960s (14 October 1984)
75. National Leagues and Ford Open (26 May 1985)
76. Leinster Football Championship (2 June 1985)
77. Tipperary v Clare (9 June 1985)
78. Cork v Limerick (16 June 1985)
79. Dublin v Wexford and Offaly v Kilkenny (23 June 1985)
80. Monaghan v Armagh (30 June 1985)
81. Cork v Tipperary (7 July 1985)
82. Munster Hurling Final (14 July 1985)
83. Munster v Ulster (21 July 1985)
84. Dublin v Laois (28 July 1985)
85. Leinster Football Final (4 August 1985)
86. Kerry v Monaghan (11 August 1985)
87. Dublin v Mayo and Mayo v Meath (18 August 1985)
88. Kerry v Monaghan (25 August 1985)
89. Hurling Final Results (1 September 1985)
90. Dublin v Mayo and Ireland v Switzerland (8 September 1985)
91. Dublin v Kilkenny (15 September 1985)
92. Dublin v Galway (22 September 1985)
93. Laois v Westmeath (1 June 1986)
94. Dublin v Offaly (8 June 1986)
95. Mayo v Roscommon (15 June 1986)
96. Spain v Belgium (22 June 1986)
97. Dublin v Offaly (29 June 1986)
98. Kerry v Cork (6 July 1986)
99. Roscommon v Galway and Kilkenny v Offaly (13 July 1986)
100. Cork v Clare (20 July 1986)
101. Meath v Leinster (27 July 1986)
102. Galway v Kilkenny (10 August 1986)
103. Tyrone v Galway (17 August 1986)
104. Highlights of the Tyrone v Galway Match (24 August 1986)
105. Handball Championships (31 August 1986)
106. Galway v Cork (7 September 1986)
107. Kerry v Tyrone (21 September 1986)
108. Champion's Battle in Hurling (28 September 1986)
109. Highlights of the Football Championship (5 October 1986)
110. Kerry v Tipperary (24 May 1987)
111. Leinster Hurling Championship (31 May 1987)
112. Clare v Tipperary (7 June 1987)
113. Cork v Limerick (14 June 1987)
114. Double Header with Leinster and Mayo v Sligo (21 June 1987)
115. Cork v Limerick and Kildare v Meath (28 June 1987)
116. Dublin v Wicklow (5 July 1987)
117. Cork v Tipperary and Galway v Mayo (12 July 1987)
118. Derry v Armagh (19 July 1987)
119. Kerry v Cork and Meath v Dublin (26 July 1987)
120. Kilkenny v Offaly (2 August 1987)
121. Galway v Tipperary (9 August 1987)
122. Galway v Cork (16 August 1987)
123. Meath v Derry (23 August 1987)
124. Galway v Cork (30 August 1987)
125. Galway v Kilkenny (6 September 1987)
126. Cork v Meath (20 September 1987)
127. The Camogie Final (27 September 1987)
128. Dublin v Meath (22 May 1988)
129. Match of the Day (29 May 1988)
130. Match of the Day (5 June 1988)
131. Match of the Day (12 June 1988)
132. The Leinster Senior Hurling Championships from Croke Park and the Ulster Senior Football Championships (19 June 1988)
133. Roscommon v Galway (26 June 1988)
134. Match of the Day (3 July 1988)
135. Match of the Day (10 July 1988)
136. Tipperary v Munster and Cork v Limerick (17 July 1988)
137. Mayo v Roscommon (24 July 1988)
138. Meath v Dublin (31 July 1988)
139. Offaly v Galway (7 August 1988)
140. All-Ireland Football Semi-finals (14 August 1988)
141. Mayo v Meath (21 August 1988)
142. Tipperary v Galway (4 September 1988)
143. Meath v Cork (18 September 1988)
144. The Camogie Final (25 September 1988)
145. All-Ireland Football Final at Croke Park (9 October 1988)
146. Dublin v Laois and Kilkenny v Westmcath (28 May 1989)
147. Cork v Waterford (4 June 1989)
148. Munster Senior Hurling Championship (11 June 1989)
149. Kilkenny v Wexford and Laois v Offaly (18 June 1989)
150. Ulster, Connacht and Leinster (25 June 1989)
151. Tipperary v Waterford (2 July 1989)
152. Leinster Hurling Final (9 July 1989)
153. Ulster Football Final (16 July 1989)
154. Kerry v Tipperary (23 July 1989)
155. Leinster Football Final (30 July 1989)
156. Offaly v Antrim and Galway v Tipperary (6 August 1989)
157. Mayo v Tyrone (13 August 1989)
158. Dublin v Cork (20 August 1989)
159. The All-Ireland Hurling Final (3 September 1989)
160. Mayo v Cork (17 September 1989)
161. Leinster Hurling and Ulster Football Championship (27 May 1990)
162. Waterford v Cork and Armagh v Tyrone (3 June 1990)
163. Tipperary v Limerick and Monaghan v Down (10 June 1990)
164. Leinster Hurling and Ulster Football Championships (17 June 1990)
165. Ulster Football Championships (24 June 1990)
166. Munster, Leinster and Connaught (1 July 1990)
167. Offaly v Dublin (8 July 1990)
168. Munster Hurling and Ulster Football Finals (15 July 1990)
169. Connacht Football Final (22 July 1990)
170. Dublin v Meath (29 July 1990)
171. All-Ireland Hurling semi-finals (5 August 1990)
172. Cork v Roscommon (12 August 1990)
173. Donegal v Meath (19 August 1990)
174. Hurling Final at Croke Park (2 September 1990)
175. Cork v Meath (16 September 1990)
176. Dublin v Kildare (5 May 1991)
177. The National Hurling League Final (12 May 1991)
178. Limerick v Clare (19 May 1991)
179. Wexford v Laois (26 May 1991)
180. Meath v Dublin (2 June 1991)
181. Tipperary v Limerick (9 June 1991)
182. Cork v Kerry and Monaghan v Derry (16 June 1991)
183. Meath v Dublin (23 June 1991)
184. Wexford v Kilkenny and Offaly v Dublin (30 June 1991)
185. Munster Hurling Championships (7 July 1991)
186. Mayo v Roscommon and Wicklow v Meath (14 July 1991)
187. Cork v Tipperary and Dublin v Kilkenny (21 July 1991)
188. Roscommon v Mayo (28 July 1991)
189. Hurling Semi-Finals (4 August 1991)
190. Down v Kerry (11 August 1991)
191. Roscommon v Meath (18 August 1991)
192. Tipperary v Kilkenny (1 September 1991)
193. Meath v Down (15 September 1991)
194. Derry v Tyrone (3 May 1992)
195. Tipperary v Limerick (10 May 1992)
196. Waterford v Tipperary (17 May 1992)
197. Cork v Kerry (24 May 1992)
198. Offaly v Dublin (31 May 1992)
199. Tipperary v Cork (7 June 1992)
200. Galway v Mayo and Waterford v Limerick (14 June 1992)
201. Wexford v Dublin (21 June 1992)
202. Roscommon v Leitrim (28 June 1992)
203. Limerick v Cork (5 July 1992)
204. Dublin v Louth (12 July 1992)
205. Three Matches (19 July 1992)
206. Dublin v Kildare and Mayo v Roscommon (26 July 1992)
207. Down v Cork and Kilkenny v Galway (9 August 1992)
208. Donegal v Mayo (16 August 1992)
209. Clare v Kerry (23 August 1992)
210. Clare v Dublin (6 September 1992)
211. All-Ireland Football Champions' Hotel (20 September 1992)
212. Dongeal v Dublin (2 May 1993)
213. Cork v Wexford (9 May 1993)
214. Longford v Offaly (16 May 1993)
215. Clare v Limerick and Cavan v Monaghan (23 May 1993)
216. Kilkenny v Offaly and Down v Kerry (30 May 1993)
217. Dublin v Leinster (6 June 1993)
218. Clare v Cork, Laois v Meath, Armagh v Tyrone (13 June 1993)
219. Derry v Monaghan and Mayo v Sligo (20 June 1993)
220. Leitrim v Roscommon and Kildare v Offaly (27 June 1993)
221. Clare v Tipperary, Down v Antrim, Dublin v Meath (4 July 1993)
222. Kilkenny v Wexford (11 July 1993)
223. Tipperary v Cork and Donegal v Derry (18 July 1993)
224. Mayo v Roscommon and Dublin v Kildare (25 July 1993)
225. Antrim v Kilkenny and Galway v Tipperary (8 August 1993)
226. Cork v Mayo and Cork v Galway (15 August 1993)
227. Dublin v Derry (22 August 1993)
228. Meath v Kerry (29 August 1993)
229. Kilkenny v Galway (5 September 1993)
230. Galway v Kilkenny (12 September 1993)
231. Cork v Derry (19 September 1993)
232. Galway v Armagh and Cork v Galway (26 September 1993)
233. Galway v Kilkenny (3 October 1993)
234. Meath v Armagh (1 May 1994)
235. The Church and General National League Hurling Final (8 May 1994)
236. Munster v Ulster (15 May 1994)
237. Leinster v Ulster (22 May 1994)
238. Derry, Tipperary and Westmeath (29 May 1994)
239. Cork v Limerick (5 June 1994)
240. Meath v Laois and Armagh v Tyrone (12 June 1994)
241. Limerick v Waterford (19 June 1994)
242. Cork v Kerry and Mayo v Sligo (26 June 1994)
243. Leitrim v Galway and Wexford v Meath (3 July 1994)
244. Clare v Limerick (10 July 1994)
245. Offaly v Wexford and Tyrone v Down (17 July 1994)
246. Munster v Connacht (24 July 1994)
247. Dublin v Meath (31 July 1994)
248. All Ireland Hurling Semi-Final (7 August 1994)
249. Cork v Down (14 August 1994)
250. Leitrim v Dublin (21 August 1994)
251. Mayo v Cork (28 August 1994)
252. Offaly v Limerick (4 September 1994)
253. Galway v Kilkenny (11 September 1994)
254. Dublin v Down (18 September 1994)
255. Down v Donegal (21 May 1995)
256. Kildare v Louth (28 May 1995)
257. Clare v Cork (4 June 1995)
258. Leitrim's Bank of Ireland Connacht Football Championship (11 June 1995)
259. Dublin v Louth (18 June 1995)
260. Offaly v Wexford (25 June 1995)
261. Meath v Wicklow (2 July 1995)
262. Limerick v Clare (9 July 1995)
263. Offaly v Kilkenny (16 July 1995)
264. Cork v Kerry (23 July 1995)
265. Dublin v Meath (30 July 1995)
266. Offaly v Down and Clare v Galway (6 August 1995)
267. Galway v Tyrone (13 August 1995)
268. Dublin v Cork (20 August 1995)
269. Mayo v Kerry (27 August 1995)
270. Offaly v Clare (3 September 1995)
271. Tipperary v Kilkenny and Kerry v Mayo (10 September 1995)
272. Dublin v Tyrone (17 September 1995)
273. Cork v Limerick (26 May 1996)
274. Kilkenny v Wexford (2 June 1996)
275. Tyrone v Fermanagh (9 June 1996)
276. Clare v Limerick (16 June 1996)
277. Mayo v Roscommon (23 June 1996)
278. Derry v Tyrone (30 June 1996)
279. Tipperary v Limerick (7 July 1996)
280. Wexford v Offaly (14 July 1996)
281. Cork v Kerry (21 July 1996)
282. Dublin v Meath (28 July 1996)
283. Limerick v Antrim and Galway v Leinster (4 August 1996)
284. Kerry v Mayo (11 August 1996)
285. Meath v Tyrone 18 August 1996)
286. Limerick v Wexford (1 September 1996)
287. Under 21 Football and Hurling Championships (8 September 1996)
288. Mayo v Meath (15 September 1996)
289. The Bank of Ireland Football Championship (29 September 1996)
290. Down v Tyrone (18 May 1997)
291. Mayo v Galway and Limerick v Waterford (25 May 1997)
292. Monaghan v Derry (1 June 1997)
293. Cork v Clare (8 June 1997)
294. Dublin v Meath and Limerick v Tipperary (15 June 1997)
295. Wexford v Offaly (22 June 1997)
296. Mayo v Leitrim, Derry v Tyrone, Louth v Offaly and Kerry v Tipperary (29 June 1997)
297. Clare v Tipperary (6 July 1997)
298. Wexford v Kilkenny (13 July 1997)
299. Clare v Kerry, Cavan v Derry and Kildare v Meath (20 July 1997)
300. Galway v Kilkenny (27 July 1997)
301. Kildare v Meath and Mayo v Sligo (3 August 1997)
302. Clare v Kilkenny (10 August 1997)
303. Galway v Tipperary and Tipperary v Wexford (17 August 1997)
304. Cavan v Kerry (24 August 1997)
305. Mayo v Offaly (31 August 1997)
306. Clare v Tipperary (7 September 1997)
307. Clare v Galway (14 September 1997)
308. Kerry v Mayo (21 September 1997)
309. Mayo v Cork and Tyrone v Laois (28 September 1997)
310. Cork v Waterford (17 May 1998)
311. Mayo v Galway (24 May 1998)
312. Limerick v Cork (31 May 1998)
313. Cork v Tipperary (7 June 1998)
314. Wexford v Offaly (14 June 1998)
315. Clare v Cork (21 June 1998)
316. Armagh v Derry (28 June 1998)
317. Kerry v Cork and Kilkenny v Offaly (5 July 1998)
318. Clare v Waterford (12 July 1998)
319. Donegal v Derry (19 July 1998)
320. All-Ireland Hurling Championships (26 July 1998)
321. Meath v Kildare and Kerry v Tipperary (2 August 1998)
322. Clare v Offaly (9 August 1998)
323. Kilkenny v Galway and Waterlord v Kilkenny (16 August 1998)
324. Derry v Galway (23 August 1998)
325. Kerry v Kildare (30 August 1998)
326. Cork v Galway (6 September 1998)
327. Kilkenny v Offaly (13 September 1998)
328. Cork v Galway (20 September 1998)
329. Laois v Tyrone (27 September 1998)
330. All-Ireland Women's Senior Football Final (4 October 1998)
331. Ireland v Australia (18 October 1998)
332. Monaghan v Wexford (25 October 1998)
333. Cork v Dublin (9 May 1999)
334. Galway v Tipperary (16 May 1999)
335. Kerry v Tipperary (23 May 1999)
336. Waterford v Limerick (30 May 1999)
337. Clare v Tipperary (6 June 1999)
338. Cork v Waterford, Derry v Cavan, Laois v Westmeath, Kildare v Offaly and Mayo v Roscommon (13 June 1999)
339. Offaly v Wexford (20 June 1999)
340. Dublin v Laois and Fermanagh v Tyrone (27 June 1999)
341. Armagh v Derry (4 July 1999)
342. Down v Tyrone (11 July 1999)
343. Cork v Kerry and Galway v Mayo (18 July 1999)
344. Antrim v Offaly and Clare v Galway (25 July 1999)
345. Armagh v Down and Dublin v Meath (1 August 1999)
346. Cork v Offaly (8 August 1999)
347. Clare v Kilkenny (15 August 1999)
348. Mayo v Cork (22 August 1999)
349. Armagh v Meath (29 August 1999)
350. Kilkenny v Tipperary (5 September 1999)
351. Cork v Tipperary (12 September 1999)
352. Galway v Kilkenny (19 September 1999)
353. Cork v Meath (26 September 1999)
354. Waterford v Mayo (3 October 1999)
355. Waterford v Tipperary (28 May 2000)
356. Cork v Limerick and Meath v Offaly (4 June 2000)
357. Mayo v Sligo (11 June 2000)
358. Antrim v Derry and Cork v Kerry (18 June 2000)
359. Armagh v Fermanagh and Kildare v Offaly (25 June 2000)
360. Cork v Tipperary (2 July 2000)
361. Sligo v Galway and Offaly v Kilkenny (9 July 2000)
362. Armagh v Ulster and Kerry v Clare (16 July 2000)
363. Tipperary v Galway and Derry v Offaly (23 July 2000)
364. Kildare v Dublin and Leitrim v Galway (30 July 2000)
365. Cork v Offaly (6 August 2000)
366. Dublin v Kildare (12 August 2000)
367. Kerry v Armagh (20 August 2000)
368. Galway v Kildare (27 August 2000)
369. Cork v Tipperary (3 September 2000)
370. Kilkenny v Offaly (10 September 2000)
371. Galway v Limerick (17 September 2000)
372. Kerry v Galway (24 September 2000)
373. Mayo v Waterford (1 October 2000)
374. Match of the Day (8 October 2000)
375. Ireland v Australia (15 October 2000)
376. Dongeal v Fermanagh (13 May 2001)
377. Armagh v Tyrone (20 May 2001)
378. Cork v Limerick (27 May 2001)
379. Match of the Day (3 June 2001)
380. Limerick v Waterford (10 June 2001)
381. Derry v Tyrone and Dublin v Offaly (17 June 2001)
382. Cork v Waterford, Cavan v Monaghan and Kiidare v Meath (24 June 2001)
383. Roscommon v Mayo (1 July 2001)
384. Tyrone v Cavan and Kilkenny v Wexford (8 July 2001)
385. Leinster v Munster (15 July 2001)
386. Match of the Day (22 July 2001)
387. Limerick v Wexford and Galway v Derry (29 July 2001)
388. Derry v Tyrone and Meath v Westmeath (5 August 2001)
389. Tipperary v Galway (12 August 2001)
390. Kilkenny v Galway and Kilkenny v Cork (19 August 2001)
391. Galway v Derry (26 August 2001)
392. Kerry v Meath (2 September 2001)
393. Cork v Galway and Galway v Tipperary (9 September 2001)
394. Tipperary v Kilkenny (16 September 2001)
395. Dublin v Tyrone and Galway v Meath (23 September 2001)
396. Kerry v Limerick, Donegal v Cavan and Carlow v Westmeath (12 May 2002)
397. Tipperary v Clare (19 May 2002)
398. Cork v Waterford and Down v Donegal (26 May 2002)
399. Mayo v Galway, Meath v Westmeath, Antrim v Derry and Limerick v Tipperary (2 June 2002)
400. Armagh v Fermanagh and Kilkenny v Offaly (9 June 2002)
401. Offaly v Kildare (16 June 2002)
402. Meath v Dublin (23 June 2002)
403. Tipperary v Waterford (30 June 2002)
404. Ulster Football Final and Leinster Hurling Final (7 July 2002)
405. Match of the Day (14 July 2002)
406. Cork v Tipperary and Tyrone v Sligo (21 July 2002)
407. Tipperary v Antrim and Clare v Galway (28 July 2002)
408. Armagh v Sligo and Galway v Kerry (4 August 2002)
409. Match of the Day (11 August 2002)
410. Cork v Galway and Kilkenny v Tipperary (18 August 2002)
411. Cork v Kerry and Kerry v Meath (25 August 2002)
412. Dublin v Armagh and Longford v Derry (1 September 2002)
413. Kilkenny v Tipperary and Kilkenny v Clare (8th September 2002)
414. Cork v Tipperary (15th September 2002)
415. Kerry v Armagh (22nd September 2002)
416. Dublin v Louth and Waterford v Limerick (1 June 2003)
417. Sligo v Mayo (8 June 2003)
418. Match of the Day (15 June 2003)
419. Match of the Day (22 June 2003)
420. Match of the Day (29 June 2003)
421. Galway v Mayo and Kilkenny v Wexford (6 July 2003)
422. Down v Tyrone and Kildare v Laois (13 July 2003)
423. Kildare v Laois (20 July 2003)
424. Antrim v Wexford and Tipperary v Offaly (27 July 2003)
425. Tyrone v Fermanagh and Armagh v Laois (3 August 2003)
426. Cork v Wexford (10 August 2003)
427. Kilkenny v Tipperary (17 August 2003)
428. Kerry v Tyrone (24 August 2003)
429. Armagh v Donegal (31 August 2003)
430. Match of the Day (7 September 2003)
431. Cork v Kilkenny (14 September 2003)
432. Cork v Tipperary (21 September 2003)
433. Armagh v Tyrone (28 September 2003)
434. Tyrone v Derry (9 May 2004)
435. Clare v Waterford (16 May 2004)
436. Roscommon v Sligo (23 May 2004)
437. Limerick v Cork (30 May 2004)
438. Westmeath v Dublin and Tipperary v Waterford (6 June 2004)
439. Cork v Kerry and Kilkenny v Wexford (13 June 2004)
440. Donegal v Tyrone and Meath v Laois (20 June 2004)
441. Mayo v Galway, Cork v Waterford and Westmeath v Wexford (27 June 2004)
442. Offaly v Wexford (4 July 2004)
443. Armagh v Donegal and Limerick v Kerry (11 July 2004)
444. Mayo v Roscommon and Laois v Westmeath (18 July 2004)
445. Match of the Day (25 July 2004)
446. Roscommon v Dublin and Tyrone v Westmeath (1 August 2004)
447. Waterford v Kilkenny (8 August 2004)
448. Wexford v Cork (15 August 2004)

== See also ==
- League Sunday
