= Paul Roundhill =

English artist, publisher, and writer

- Born: Paul Nicholas Roundhill; 25 March 1955 (age 71); Edgware, London, England
- Occupations: artist, writer

Paul Nicholas Roundhill (born 25 March 1955) is an English artist, publisher, and writer based in the East End of London. He is best known for his association with musician Pete Doherty, acting as his self-styled literary agent and previously running the website balachada.com, which was closed by Doherty in May 2006.

== Music and multimedia ==
Roundhill developed a relationship with the musician Pete Doherty in the early days of the Libertines, an English indie rock band active from 1999 until 2004. He co-wrote the song "The Saga", which is on side 2 of their second album, The Libertines.

His relationship with Doherty led Roundhill to expose him on the website www.balachadha.com (Bala Chadha being street slang for crack cocaine from the Bengali translation of "good white"), claiming that fans could get a closer insight into Doherty's life. He recorded videos on a webcam of Doherty playing acoustic guitar, smoking drugs and self-harming. Smart Software Services charged fans a small fee to watch these videos.

He appears for 4 seconds in the Babyshambles music video for song "The Blinding".

== Death of Mark Blanco ==
Mark Blanco, a 30-year-old actor, died in 2006 after plunging 11 feet (3.4 m) to his death from a first floor balcony outside Roundhill's flat in east London after being ejected by Roundhill. Blanco, who had been drinking, had allegedly become physically aggressive towards Doherty, a fellow guest. During the altercation before he was ejected, Roundhill took Blanco's hat off and set it alight, allegedly in an attempt to distract him away from the singer. Doherty and Roundhill were interviewed by police, and neither were considered suspects in Blanco's death. More recent findings indicate that Blanco may have been pushed from the balcony, and his family is attempting to get the police to investigate the case again.

Singer/songwriter Paul Cunniffe also died in a fall from Roundhill's flat in August 2001. Roundhill claims to have no memory of that incident.

== Drugs ==
Boy George wrote of Roundhill in his autobiography Take It Like A Man: "That night I made a lethal connection with Paul Cod [George's name for Roundhill] – a pond-life dealer and junkie". In 2006 Roundhill was convicted of possessing Class A drugs as a result of the investigation of pictures published in the Daily Mirror of Kate Moss apparently snorting cocaine. He pleaded guilty to the offence and received a 12-month conditional discharge.

Roundhill was living at a Salvation Army homeless centre by Canary Wharf in 2009 but after relapsing several times he was asked to leave by the centre management.

== Rampart Street arson attack ==
Roundhill's flat in Rampart St., Whitechapel was subject to an arson attack in mid-2008.
