= Vincent Hogan =

Irish sports journalist

Vincent Hogan is an Irish sports journalist who writes for the Irish Independent. As a ghost writer of autobiographies, he has written with sports personalities such as international soccer player Paul McGrath (Back from the Brink, the 2006 (British Sports Autobiography of the Year) William Hill Irish Sports Book of the Year; Boylesport Irish Sports Book of the year); rugby union and Gaelic football player Eddie O'Sullivan; and inter-county GAA players Nicky English, Henry Shefflin, and Colm "the Gooch" Cooper. He is co-driver to amateur Irish rally driver and RTÉ Sport presenter Michael Lyster.

Some of his colour pieces have caused controversy. In the aftermath of their exclusion of teammate Kevin Cassidy from a team holiday, he described the Donegal senior football team under Jim McGuinness as "sheep".
