= Noelie McDonnell =

Irish singer-songwriter

- Birth name: Noel McDonnell
- Origin: Tuam, County Galway, Ireland
- Genres: Folk, indie, Folk rock
- Instrument(s): Vocals, guitar, harmonica

Noelie McDonnell is an Irish singer-songwriter from Tuam, County Galway. A former secondary school teacher, he began recording music in the mid-2000s and was described by Irish music magazine Hot Press as "a hybrid of John Prine, Johnny Cash and Bob Dylan". He released his debut EP in 2004, followed by three solo albums between 2005 and 2009. In 2012, McDonnell, Noriana Kennedy, and Nicola Joyce co-founded the folk band The Whileaways, which has released four studio albums between 2013 and 2022. In 2013, he became a member of the short-lived "supergroup" The Cabin Collective, and in 2024 he became a member of Tuam-based folk-rock band The Saw Doctors.

== Career ==
A former secondary school teacher at St Patrick's College, Tuam, McDonnell began releasing music in the mid-2000s and toured as a support act for The Saw Doctors. His debut release was an EP entitled Downhome in 2004. He released his self-titled debut album in 2005 and his second album, Beyond Hard Places, in 2008. A song from his second album, "Nearly Four," reached number 15 in the Irish singles chart. His third and most recent solo album, Come Alive, appeared in 2009.

In 2012, with Noriana Kennedy and Nicola Joyce, McDonnell co-founded the folk band The Whileaways. Their self-titled debut album appeared in 2013, followed by the albums Saltwater Kisses (2015), From What We're Made (2018), and In All Honesty (2022). The Whileaways also became known for their show Bird on the Wire, a collaboration with Pauline Scanlon, featuring the songs of Leonard Cohen.

In 2013, McDonnell became a member of the short-lived nine-man "supergroup" The Cabin Collective that also included members of The Saw Doctors and former members of The Waterboys. In 2024, he became a member of The Saw Doctors as a guitarist and backing vocalist.
