= Michael Lyster =

Irish radio and television broadcaster (1954–2026)

- Born: Michael Lyster; 1954; Dungarvan, County Waterford, Ireland
- Died: 21 March 2026 (aged 72); St. Vincent's University Hospital, Dublin, Ireland.
- Education: St. Jarlath's College
- Occupation: Sports broadcaster
- Years active: 1980–2018
- Notable credit: The Sunday Game
- Spouse: Anne Lyster (m. 1985)
- Children: 4

Michael Lyster (4 February 1954 – 21 March 2026) was an Irish radio and television broadcaster who worked for RTÉ. He mainly covered sporting events, such as Gaelic games and Olympic Games. He was best known for presenting The Sunday Game Live, which he hosted from 1984 to 2018.

== Early life ==
The son of a member of the Garda Síochána, Lyster was born in Dungarvan, County Waterford. When he was four years old, his father was transferred to Barnaderg, County Galway, where Lyster spent his formative years. He was educated at St Jarlath's College in nearby Tuam. After leaving school, he started working in the laboratory of the local sugar factory.

== Career ==
=== Journalism ===
Lyster began his journalistic career as a junior reporter with The Tuam Herald where he wrote a music column. He spent seven years with that newspaper before moving to television and radio.

=== Television and radio ===
In 1980, Lyster joined RTÉ as a sports bulletin broadcaster with Radio 2, however, as his career progressed he began presenting programmes and covering high-profile sporting events. In his first year at the national broadcaster, he also covered the Olympic Games on radio. One of the highlights of his early career was covering the 1982 and 1983 All-Ireland hurling finals for radio. In 1984, Lyster took over as presenter of The Sunday Game, a post he held for 34 years. That same year, he was one of the main presenters for RTÉ's television coverage of the Summer Olympics in Los Angeles, co-hosting the morning slot with Moya Doherty. It was RTÉ's first venture into breakfast television with the slot combining action from the Games with cookery and dance classes amongst other things.

In 1988, Lyster won a Jacob's Award for his work on The Sunday Game. Later Lyster covered a number of sports for RTÉ across all codes and was an ever-present feature on RTÉ's coverage of Olympic Games. He remained, however, mostly associated with Gaelic games and was one of the main presenters of the All-Star and the RTÉ Sports Person of the Year awards shows.

In 2007, Lyster took part in Celebrity Jigs 'n' Reels. Famously, when a penalty was applied to Hannah Craig during the 2012 Summer Olympics, Carl Dunne, head of the Irish canoeing team, telephoned RTÉ's analyst to discuss the possibility of appealing the decision. The analyst took the telephone call live on television as a bemused Lyster watched on.

After suffering ill health, Lyster decided to retire from The Sunday Game at the end of 2018, with the 2018 All-Ireland Senior Football Championship Final his last as presenter.

In total from 1984 until 2018, he covered 77 All-Ireland finals across both football and hurling, including seven replays.

== Personal life ==
Lyster was married to his wife Anne from 1985 until his death and together they had two boys and two girls. They lived in Cabinteely in Dublin. Lyster was interested in rally driving which he enjoyed from the early 1990s onwards. He partook in many main events including the Cork International Rally where he finished third in 1992, the Circuit of Ireland Rally and the Killarney Rally of the Lakes. His co-driver was Irish Independent sports writer Vincent Hogan.

=== Illness and death ===
On 5 June 2015, Lyster experienced a major heart attack and was rushed to hospital. He had been playing golf in Galway with friend Vincent Hogan who drove him back to Dublin afterwards. He left his mobile phone in Vincent's car whom he rang from his house phone asking him to return to the house with the mobile. Hogan returned to find him collapsed on the ground in the hallway. Lyster's wife Anne performed CPR while Vincent called for an ambulance. He had a pacemaker fitted after receiving treatment. Lyster later disclosed that he had suffered from a heart condition for a number of years prior to the attack.

Lyster died at St. Vincent's University Hospital in March 2026, at the age of 72.
