= Eimhin Cradock =

Irish musician and teacher

Eímhín Cradock (born 1986) is an Irish musician, known as a former drummer with Tuam-based band The Saw Doctors. He is also a primary school teacher in Headford, County Galway and a drum instructor.

A native of Caherlistrane, Cradock began drumming around 1996. He developed his interest in music while at secondary school in Headford. A fan of The Saw Doctors since childhood, he joined the band in January 2007, having previously performed with their frequent support act Noelie McDonnell. The band's 2010 album "The Further Adventures of ...The Saw Doctors" includes Cradock's writing on songs such as "Takin' The Train" and "Be Yourself." Cradock toured extensively with The Saw Doctors, performing in the UK, Australia and the US. In 2013 he joined the short-lived Galway "supergroup" The Cabin Collective and also played with the Headford-based band EDFT. He is a drum instructor with Cloughanover Music School and director of the Drumadore Drumming School.

In 2013, Cradock began dating Noriana Kennedy, part of the Galway folk trio The Whileaways, which also includes McDonnell. Kennedy gave birth to the couple's first child in 2014 and they married in Doolin, County Clare, in August 2015.
