= Blaze X =

Blaze X (1979–1981) were an Irish new wave band. The band was formed in Tuam, County Galway by friends Paul Cunniffe and Paul Ralph.

They released a single in 1980, "Some Hope" which became Larry Gogan's 'hit song of the week' on 2FM. Its B-side, "Rippy", about serial killer The Yorkshire Ripper was banned by the RTÉ.

Their highest profile was when they supported U2 in Leisureland in Galway. Frontman Paul Cunniffe went on to have a solo career in London, but died in 2001. Guitarist Davy Carton went on to form The Saw Doctors.

Following the death of Paul Cunniffe, a CD of their songs was released in 2003. It features various live tracks recorded from a gig in the scout hall in Tuam, and tracks recorded in the RCF studio in Ballybane, Galway City.
