= The Tuam Herald =

Irish newspaper

- Type: Weekly newspaper
- Format: 8-column broadsheet until March 2015; now compact
- Editor: David Burke
- Founded: 1837
- Political alignment: Centrist
- Headquarters: Dublin Road, Tuam
- Website: www.tuamherald.ie

The Tuam Herald is a weekly Irish newspaper, founded in 1837 by Richard Kelly, which serves the town of Tuam and County Galway. It has a circulation of about 10,000 copies.

The newspaper is printed (but not owned) by Celtic Media Group.

== People ==
- Billy Coss
- David Connors
- Mark Walsh
- Siobhan Holliman
