= The Saw Doctors =

Irish rock band

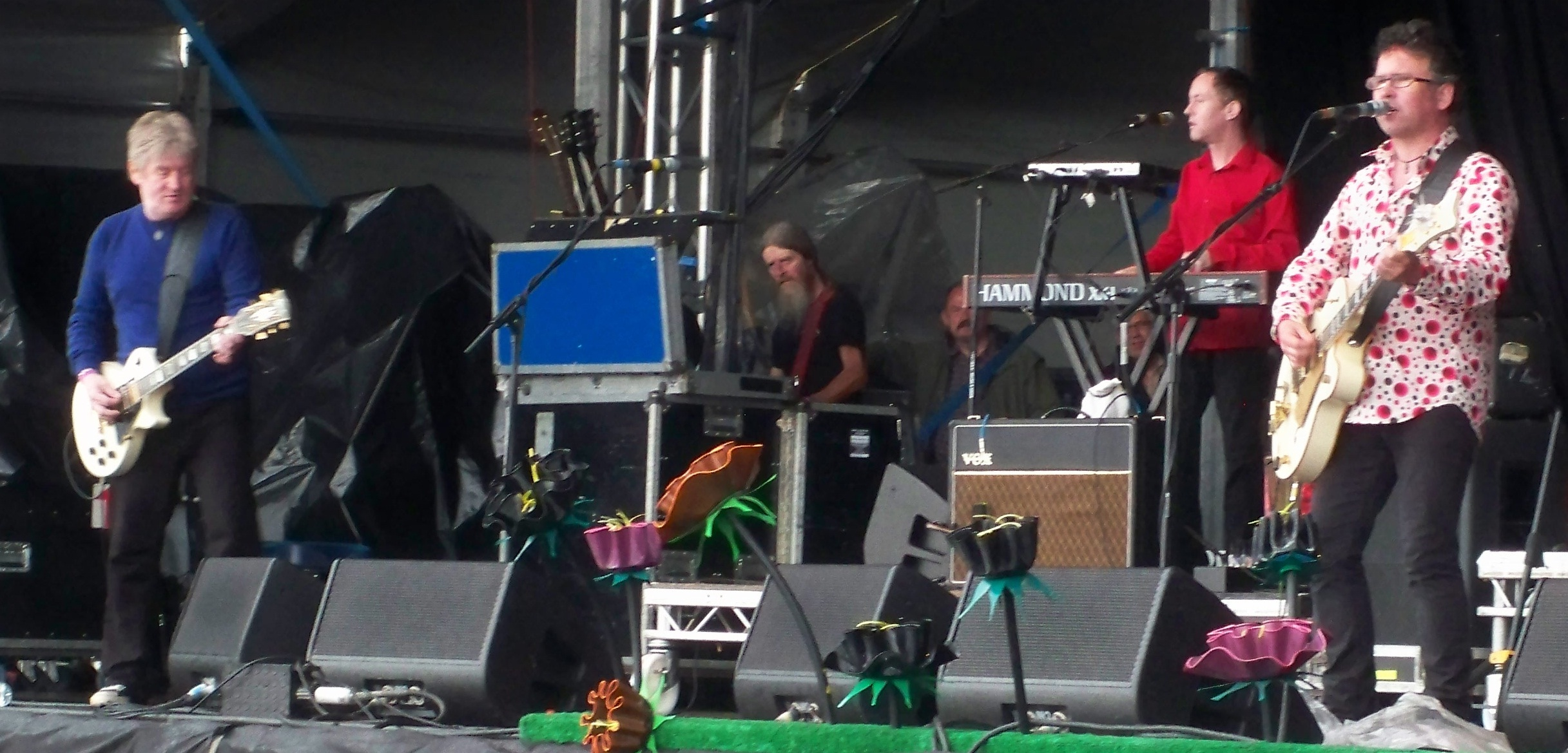
- The Saw Doctors performing at Guilfest in 2011.

Background information
- Origin: Tuam, County Galway, Ireland
- Genres: Rock
- Years active: 1986–present
- Label: Shamtown
- Members: Davy Carton; Tommy Carton; Pearse Doherty; Kieran Duddy; Noelie McDonnell; Leo Moran; Rickie O'Neill; Anthony Thistlethwaite
- Past members: Fran Breen; John "Turps" Burke; Eímhín Craddock; John Donnelly; Kevin Duffy; Jim Higgins; Tony Lambert; Fergal ‘Red’ McGrath; Will Merrigan; Derek Murray; Mary O'Connor; Padraig Stevens
- Website: The Saw Doctors' official website

The Saw Doctors are an Irish folk-rock band from Tuam, County Galway. Formed in 1986, they toured in the late 1980s in support of bands including the Hothouse Flowers, the Stunning, and the Waterboys, earning a reputation for their dynamic live performances. They rose to prominence with their second single, "I Useta Lover". Released in July 1990, it spent nine weeks at number one in the Irish charts and remains the country's all-time biggest-selling single. The Saw Doctors' 1991 debut album, If This Is Rock and Roll, I Want My Old Job Back, entered the Irish albums chart at number one.

The Saw Doctors have achieved eighteen Top 30 singles in the Irish charts, including three number ones. They have released seven studio albums, in addition to live albums and compilation albums. In 2008, they received a Lifetime Achievement Award at the Meteor Ireland Music Awards. Anchored by founding members Davy Carton and Leo Moran, the band continues to tour and release new music.

== Career ==
=== Origins and line-up ===
Formed in 1986 by Leo Moran (formerly a member of defunct Tuam reggae band, Too Much for the White Man) and Davy Carton (formerly a songwriter and guitarist with short-lived Tuam punk band Blaze X), the Saw Doctors initially started off playing small gigs in local venues with local vocalist Mary O'Connor. Carton and Moran have been the only constant presences in the Saw Doctors' line-up. Notable former members have included musician and producer John "Turps" Burke; keyboard and accordion player Tony Lambert; keyboard and guitar player Derek Murray; and drummers Padraig Stevens, John Donnelly, Jim Higgins and Fran Breen.

As of 2025, the Saw Doctors are Moran (vocals, guitar), Carton (vocals, guitar), Noelie McDonnell (backing vocals, guitar), Tommy Carton (backing vocals), Kieran Duddy (keyboards, accordion), Anthony Thistlethwaite (saxophone), Pearse Doherty (bass guitar, tin whistle), and Rickie O'Neill (drums).

=== Rise to fame ===
The Saw Doctors rose to national attention during 1987 and 1988 as they toured in support of popular Irish bands such as the Hothouse Flowers and The Stunning. In the spring of 1988, when The Saw Doctors were playing a six-week residency at the Quays Bar in Galway, their live show attracted the attention of The Waterboys, who were then recording their Fisherman's Blues album in nearby Spiddal. Pub sessions and budding friendships among the two groups would prove fruitful for the Saw Doctors' future and would see eventual crossovers between the two groups. The band's current saxophonist, Anthony Thistlethwaite, and former drummer, Fran Breen, have both been members of The Waterboys.

In the autumn of 1988, The Saw Doctors filmed a rockumentary on a flat-bed truck while driving between Galway and Salthill to parody U2's newly released Rattle and Hum film, in which U2 played Bob Dylan's "All Along the Watchtower" from a flat-bed truck in San Francisco. The Saw Doctors' Crackle and Buzz had its "world premiere" at the Claddagh Palace Cinema in Galway. The Saw Doctors played live from the cinema's balcony, caricaturing the short acoustic set U2 played atop the Savoy Cinema on O'Connell Street when Rattle and Hum premiered there on 27 October 1988. Footage from the stunt was featured on RTÉ's main evening news.

In late 1988 and early 1989, The Saw Doctors accompanied The Waterboys on tours of Ireland and Great Britain. In August 1989, The Waterboys' frontman Mike Scott produced the band's first single, "N17," a song about an Irish emigrant wishing to be back on the N17 national route that connects Galway with County Mayo and County Sligo, passing through the Saw Doctors' hometown of Tuam. Singer Mike Scott recalled the interactions: "I worked with the Saw Doctors in two capacities. They were our support band on tour, and a wonderful support band. It was their first proper tour, so they brought to it that sense of being thrilled: ‘We’re in a real band out on the road!’ We had been on the road for ten years, so it was a great reminder for us what it feels like. They were a great band, and the other capacity was as a producer. I produced their first record: ‘N17’. They were green then, but very good in the studio. We got the job done.”

Although "N17" did not chart upon its original release, the band's appearance at the inaugural 1990 Féile music festival in Thurles, County Tipperary, cemented their reputation as a live act.

Following their success at Féile, the band released their second single, "I Useta Lover," an off-colour paean to an ex-girlfriend. The single topped the Irish charts in September 1990 and spent nine weeks at number one, becoming Ireland's all-time best-selling single. A re-released "N17" reached number two in the Irish charts at Christmas 1990, and the following year, the band's debut album If This Is Rock and Roll, I Want My Old Job Back entered the Irish albums chart at number one.

In 1992, the band released their second Album All The Way From Tuam, which included live favourites "Green & Red of Mayo", "Exhilarating Sadness" and "You Got Me on the Run" as well as the singles "Wake Up Sleeping", "Pied Piper", "Never Mind The Strangers", "Me Heart Is Living in the Sixties Still" and their next number one hit, "Hay Wrap". After the release of All The Way From Tuam, the band parted company with Warner Music and formed their own record label, Shamtown Records.

The first release under their new Shamtown label was the "Small Bit of Love" EP which gained them their first Top 30 hit in the UK Singles Chart and an appearance on BBC Television's Top of the Pops.

The band released their third studio album Same Oul' Town in February 1996. It went on to peak at number six in the UK Albums Chart. It included the hit singles "World of Good", "To Win Just Once" and the double A-side "Clare Island" / "Everyday". The band's subsequent work did not reach the same success of Same Oul' Town, and many line-up changes happened over the next few years. However, they had successful British and US tours, and appeared at the Glastonbury Festival and Oxegen.

In October 1998, their fourth album Songs From Sun Street was released, which included tracks that had been part of the live show for the previous few years including "Galway & Mayo", "Tommy K" & "I'll Be on My Way". They also appeared in the 1999 Walter Foote film The Tavern as well as contributing songs to its soundtrack.

The fifth studio album Villains? was released in 2001 and contained the minor hit "This Is Me". Entertainment.ie said in its review "to many music fans they're a novelty act that's long since passed its sell-by date. It would be a shame, however, if their dodgy image obscured the music, since Villains? is by some distance the best album they've ever made."

Pearse Doherty left the band after the Villains? tour, leaving only Carton and Moran as members from the early days. The line-up changed to include Anthony Thistlethwaite on bass guitar. Thistlethwaite had been playing saxophone on and off with the band since the late 1980s, even playing on their first single "N17".

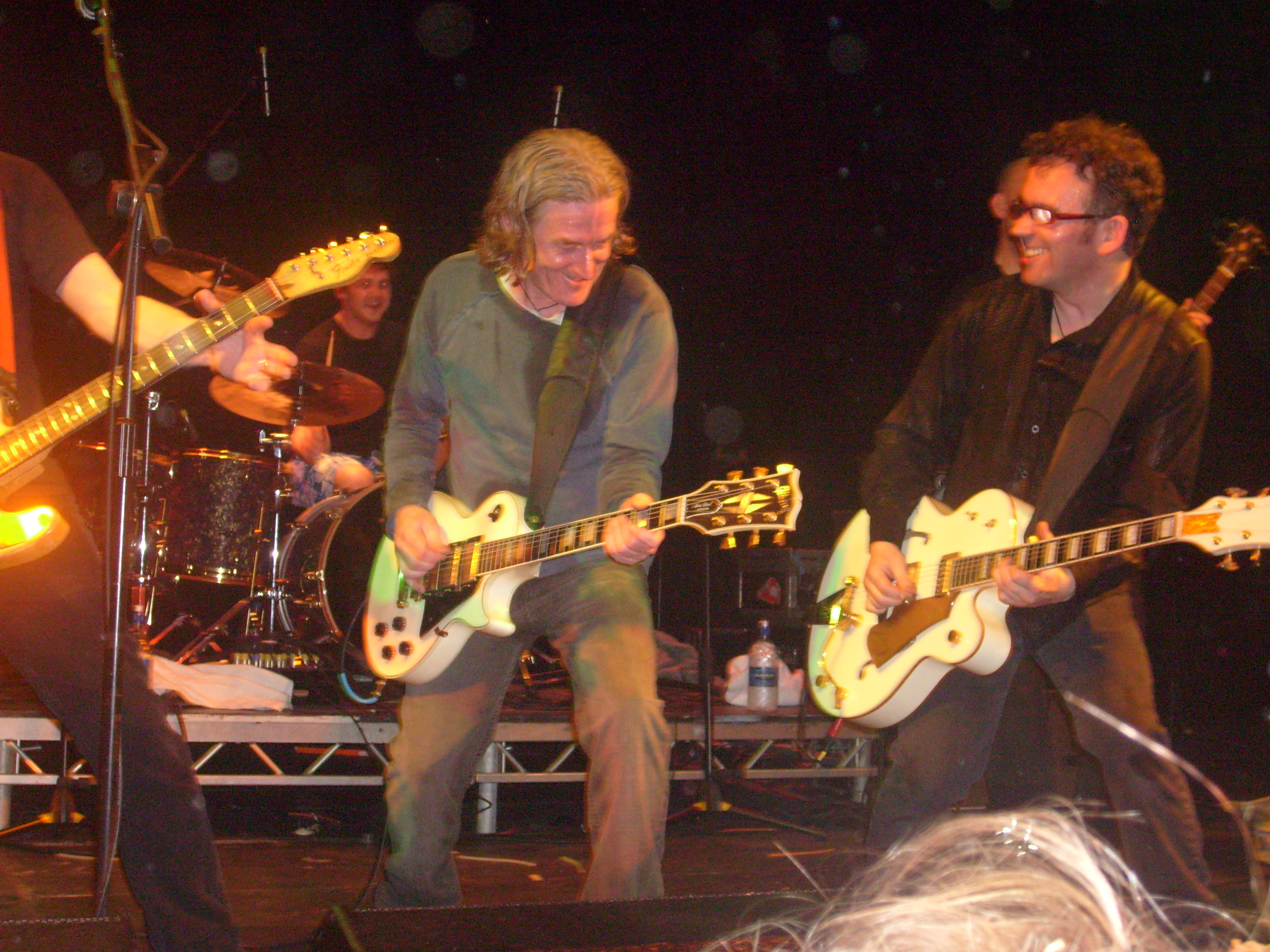

Live in Galway was released on CD and DVD in 2004. Another live album, Live on News Year's Day as well as the sixth studio album The Cure followed. At the 2008 Meteor Irish Music Awards, the Saw Doctors received the Lifetime Achievement Award. The week before the Meteor Awards the band appeared on the Podge & Rodge Show on RTÉ, during which they covered the Sugababes song "About You Now"; they later decided to release the track as a single, and in October 2008, "About You Now" reached number one in the Irish chart, some seventeen years since their last chart-topping feat.

They followed this with the release of another live album and DVD, Live at the Melody Tent, recorded in Cape Cod in the summer of 2008. "She Loves Me" charted at number two. In 2009 after six studio albums, Universal Music released To Win Just Once – The Best of The Saw Doctors. The compilation album featured twenty two of their tracks, and went platinum within weeks of release.

During 2010, the band played a number of music festival appearances, including playing at the 40th anniversary of the Glastonbury Festival. September 2010 saw the release of their seventh album, The Further Adventures of... The Saw Doctors.

In spring 2013, the Saw Doctors announced a break from touring, initially for a year.

In 2016, the band made the announcement that they would be back in the studio, and during the spring and summer of that year, they toured for the first time in over four years. The band toured Ireland, the UK and US and made an appearance on Ireland's The Late Late Show.

Their tour of the UK and Ireland scheduled for the Autumn and Winter of 2016 was put on hold, as Davy Carton was recovering from a throat operation. The dates were rescheduled to take place in the Spring of 2017.

When the Ireland and UK tour finally took place towards the end of 2017, it was a triumphant success. Subsequently, it was announced that Carton and Moran were writing material for a planned new album.

After a 5-year break from touring, in March 2022, The Saw Doctors announced a 4-date UK Tour for November and December 2022. This tour consisted of dates in Glasgow, London, Leeds and Manchester Apollo.

The Saw Doctors continued their revival in 2023 with shows across Ireland and the U.K. In March, after much speculation, they announced they would play two shows in the United States; one in New York City and one in Boston. Tickets for those shows went on sale on April 4 and sold out almost immediately. These were their only US shows of 2023. The New York City show took place on July 7 at the Hammerstein Ballroom and the Boston show took place July 8 at the MGM Music Hall.

The RTÉ documentary "Aistear an Amhráin" looks at the stories behind some of Ireland's most popular songs, and Season 1 Episode 2 delved into the history and impact of "N17".

In 2024, the band released a five-track EP entitled Whad’d’ya Think a That, including the songs "Whad’d’ya Think a That?" "I Love to Go Awanderin'" and "Man In The Moon". They played at the Hammersmith Apollo on 31 October 2024.

=== Live shows and recordings ===
Although the Saw Doctors have released a number of studio albums over their career, their live shows have brought them international renown. In 2004, the band recorded its show before a crowd at the Black Box Theatre, Galway, and released a live audio CD and a concert DVD, both titled Live in Galway. The DVD also contained a 50-minute documentary, "A Different Kind of World," following the Saw Doctors around their favourite locales in the West of Ireland (including a trip to Clare Island) and showing them on tour in Brooklyn, New York. A follow-up live album, New Year's Day, again featured the band in the Black Box Theatre, this time on New Year's Day 2005. The band donated profits from this album to victims of 2004 Indian Ocean earthquake.

The band performed three songs at Celtic Park, Glasgow on 21 November 2006 before Celtic's UEFA Champions League match with Manchester United.

=== Other projects ===
The Saw Doctors' song "She Says" Written by Leo Moran, Davy Carton,Padraig Stevens and Pearse Doherty is used as the theme song to the BBC Northern Ireland comedy series Give My Head Peace. Under the name "The Folk Footballers," Leo Moran and former Saw Doctor Padraig Stevens released The First Fifteen, a collection of songs featuring local artists that celebrated the Galway football team in the wake of its success in the 1998 All-Ireland Senior Football Championship. Re-released in 2001, when Galway again won the All-Ireland football championship. Further collaborations brought a self-titled album by another side-project band, The Shambles. Guinness used the Saw Doctors song "Never Mind the Strangers" in an advertisement campaign for Harp Lager in the US. The Saw Doctors made an appearance in The Tavern and "Same Oul' Town" was featured in the film. The Saw Doctors appeared on the 2007 Killinascully Christmas special. The band reappeared in 2010 Killinascully Christmas special.

In 1994 the single "Spanish Lady" was released by Dustin the Turkey and went to No.1 in the Irish Singles Chart on 18 November and stayed there for 4 weeks. Proceeds of the single's sale were in aid of the National Council for the Blind of Ireland. It featured Ronnie Drew and The Saw Doctors. Although not mentioned on the cover sleeve The Saw Doctors are clearly identified during the comic number when Dustin sings "Hey Ronnie is that the Saw Doctors? Is it? Who let yous into the studio? Hey eh Leo outta here this is a Dublin Song, meself and Ronnie." The Saw Doctors proceed to sing a rap verse about cooking turkey and to provide backing vocals until the end of the number.

Man United Man sung by Men United was another Saw Doctor inspired Irish chart topper. Written by Leo Moran, Davy Carton and Pearse Doherty the single's proceeds raised money for the RTÉ telethon appeal, People in Need. It reached the peak on 4 May 1996 and remained there for four weeks.

During the Saw Doctors' break from touring in 2013 three members (Moran, Thistlethwaite and O'Neill) formed a band with fellow Galway musicians called The Cabin Collective. Moran and Thistlethwaite also tour and record as a duo, Leo and Anto.

== Lottery win ==
In April 1993, the Saw Doctors' keyboard and accordion player Tony Lambert, who had previously played with Bonnie Tyler and Alex Harvey, won IR£852,000 (2023: approx. €2 million) when he won the jackpot in the Irish National Lottery's Lotto game. Lambert, who at the time was living in a converted bus that he had driven from his native Wales to Galway and parked just off the N17 road, had purchased his winning ticket in a local Claregalway shop. After his win, he left the band and settled in County Galway, where he restored an old house and built his own recording studio.

Coincidentally, the Saw Doctors' song "To Win Just Once" was written and recorded shortly before Lambert hit the Lotto jackpot. It is the only song on the Same Oul' Town album featuring him. Lambert died in Thailand in April 2018 after a long battle with heart disease.

== Discography ==
=== Albums ===
==== Studio albums ====
- If This Is Rock and Roll, I Want My Old Job Back (1991)
- All the Way from Tuam (1992)
- Same Oul' Town (1996)
- Songs from Sun Street (1998)
- Villains? (2001)
- The Cure (2006)
- The Further Adventures of... The Saw Doctors (2010)

==== Extended Plays ====
- Wha’D’Ya Think a That (2024)

==== Live albums ====
- Live in Galway (2004)
- New Year's Day (2005)
- Live at the Melody Tent (2008)

==== Compilation albums ====
- Sing a Powerful Song (1997)
- Play It Again, Sham! (2002)
- That Takes the Biscuit (2007)
- To Win Just Once / The Best of the Saw Doctors (2009)
- 25:25 (2012)

==== Discontinued releases ====
- "Friends Demos B-Sides" [contained other artists] (1994)
- "Somewhere Far Away" (1999)
- "Live on New Year's Day" [limited to 1000 copies, then re-released as "New Year's Day"] (2005)

=== Irish singles chart ===
Single	Chart position	Date
"Downtown"	2	December 2011
"Red Cortina (Special Acapella 2010)"	4	December 2010
"She Loves Me"	2	July 2009
"About You Now"	1	October 2008
"I Useta Lover" (re-issue)	7	November 2007
"She Says"	17	June 1998
"Clare Island" / "Everyday"	28	December 1996
"To Win Just Once"	24	June 1996
"World of Good"	10	January 1996
"Small Bit of Love"	5	November 1994
"Me Heart is Livin in the Sixties Still"	27	July 1993
"Never Mind The Strangers"	11	November 1992
"Pied Piper"	3	September 1992
"Presentation Boarder"	7	December 1991
"Hay Wrap"	1	September 1991
"Red Cortina" / "Only One Girl"	4	July 1991
"N17"	18	March 1991
"That's What She Said Last Night"	3	February 1991
"N17" / "It Won't Be Tonight"	2	November 1990
"I Useta Lover"	1	August 1990

=== UK singles chart ===
Single	Chart position	Date
"Stars Over Cloughanover"	69	October 2005
"This Is Me"	31	June 2002
"Simple Things"	56	December 1997
"To Win Just Once"	14	July 1996
"World of Good"	15	January 1996
"Small Bit of Love"	24	November 1994
"I Useta Lover"	102	December 1990

== Music samples ==
"N17"
From If This Is Rock and Roll, I Want My Old Job Back (1991)

"About You Now"
Sugababes cover (2008)
