= Davy Carton =

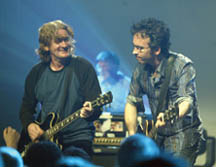
- Davy Carton (left) with Leo Moran, on stage with the Saw Doctors.

Background information
- Born: 10 April 1959 (age 67); Islington, London
- Origin: Tuam, County Galway; Ireland
- Genres: Rock, folk, roots
- Occupations: Guitarist; Songwriter; Vocalist
- Instruments: Guitar, vocals
- Years active: 1970s–present

Davy Carton (born 10 April 1959) is a singer, songwriter, and rhythm guitarist from Tuam, County Galway, in the Republic of Ireland. He is best known as a core member of the Saw Doctors, the folk-rock band he co-founded with Leo Moran and others in 1987.

== Biography and musical career ==
Born in Islington, London, Carton moved permanently to Tuam with his family in 1966. As a teenager he attended Tuam CBS, where he formed the punk band Blaze X with fellow students Paul Cunniffe, Paul Ralph, and Ja Keating. He began work in a local textile factory after leaving school, but continued to play with Blaze X until the band dissolved in 1981, the year Carton married his girlfriend Trisha.

Working full-time in the textile factory throughout Ireland's economically bleak 1980s, Carton largely put his musical career on hold to support his wife and three young sons.

In the late 1980s, Carton got together for a pint with Leo Moran, formerly of Irish reggae band Too Much for the White Man. Carton and Moran began gigging around Galway with a handful of their own rootsy-rock compositions.

The duo adopted the name Saw Doctors—travellers who earned money by sharpening saws in old Ireland—until they could think of something better. As the band grew, the opportunity to find a better name never arose.

Carton finally gave up his day job in 1989, when the Saw Doctors rose to prominence and began touring with bands including The Waterboys, The Hothouse Flowers, and The Stunning.

Carton's achievements with the Saw Doctors have included six studio albums, two live albums, a concert DVD, several compilation albums, and extensive tours throughout Europe and the United States. Noted for his witty, rapacious lyrics, Carton has co-written almost all of the band's songs, including "I Useta Lover", Ireland's all-time best-selling single.

The Saw Doctors' lyrics tend to stay out of political issues. "I'm not a politician, and I never will be a politician," Carton told the website PopMatters in 2003. "What I like to do is go into a room of people and make them sing along and whatever. I'm not going to tell them how to vote – there's enough people doing that already. I'd rather talk about girlfriends and football. We don't like to write about things we don't really know about. We know about rejection from girls and all that, so we can write about that."

== See also ==
- The Saw Doctors
- Blaze X
