= Leo Moran =

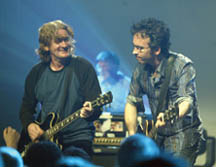
- Leo Moran (right) with Davy Carton, on stage with the Saw Doctors.

Background information
- Born: 9 November 1964 (age 60); Tuam, Galway, Ireland
- Genres: Rock, folk, roots
- Occupation(s): Guitarist; Songwriter; Vocalist
- Instrument(s): Guitar, vocals
- Years active: 1970s—present

Leo Moran (born 9 November 1964 in Tuam, Galway) is best known as lead guitarist and second vocalist in the Irish folk rock band The Saw Doctors.

Moran studied French and Sociology at University College Galway. He later trained as a secondary teacher and earned a higher diploma in education. At Galway, he met several prominent figures in the area's music scene, including Padraig Boran and Ollie Jennings, who would become the Saw Doctors' manager. In addition, he played in a local reggae band, Too Much For The White Man. Eventually, Moran formed the Saw Doctors with Davy Carton of Blaze X. In June 2013, Leo founded a new country rock band called 'The Cabin Collective'.

In late 2013 into early 2014 The Saw Doctors took a sabbatical from touring and recording. During this time Moran toured with Anthony Thistlethwaite under the name Leo & Anto.

Moran lives with his partner Eleanor (of the famous musical Joyce clan) in Tuam.
