= Brazil v Germany (2014 FIFA World Cup) =

Association football match between Brazil and Germany in 2014

Mineiraço 7–1
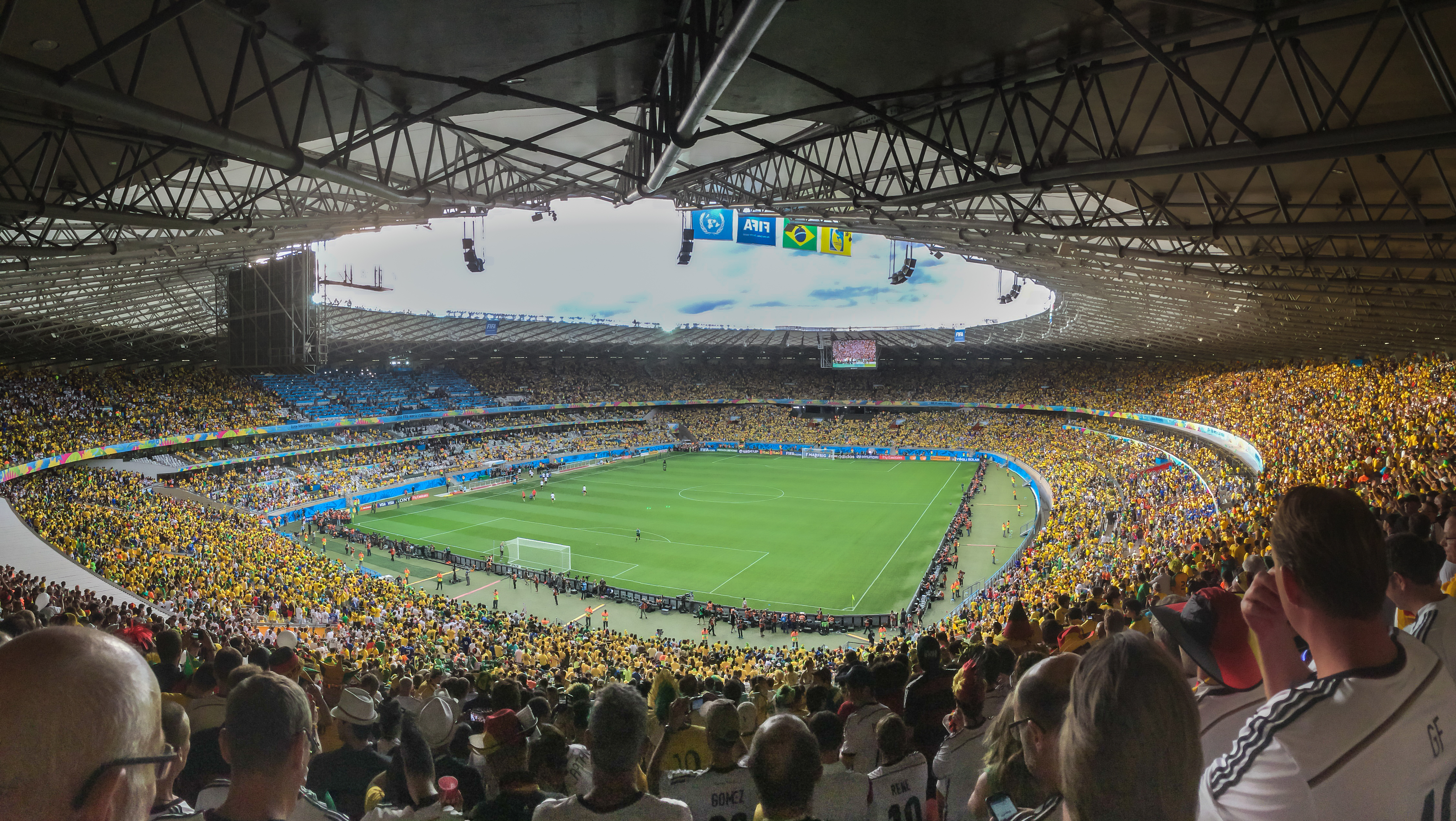
- The interior of Estádio Mineirão, 20 minutes before the start of the match
- Event: 2014 FIFA World Cup; Semi-final
Brazil	Germany
1	7
- Date: 8 July 2014
- Venue: Mineirão, Belo Horizonte, Brazil
- Man of the Match: Toni Kroos (Germany)
- Referee: Marco Antonio Rodríguez (Mexico)
- Attendance: 58,141
- Weather: Late afternoon and dusk with some clouds 22 °C (71 °F); 51% humidity

The Brazil versus Germany football match (also known by its score as 7–1, or Mineiraço in Brazil) was the first of two semi-final matches of the 2014 FIFA World Cup that took place on 8 July 2014 at the Mineirão stadium in Belo Horizonte, Brazil. Both Brazil and Germany reached the semi-finals with an undefeated record in the competition, with the Brazilians' quarter-final with Colombia causing them to lose forward Neymar to injury, and defender and captain Thiago Silva to accumulation of yellow cards. Despite the absence of these players, a close match was expected, given both teams had performed comparably well throughout the tournament. Both were regarded as the biggest traditional FIFA World Cup forces, sharing eight tournaments won (5 for Brazil and 3 for Germany) and having previously met in the 2002 FIFA World Cup final, where Brazil won 2–0 with Ronaldo Nazario scoring a brace and earning their fifth title.

This match, however, ended in a historic loss for Brazil; in a massive show of dominance, Germany led 5–0 within 29 minutes, with four goals being scored inside a six-minute span, and brought the score up to 7–0 in the second half. Brazil scored a consolation goal through Oscar in the last minute, ending the match 7–1. Germany's Toni Kroos was selected as the man of the match.

The game marked several tournament records. Germany's win marked the largest margin of victory in a FIFA World Cup semi-final. The game saw Germany overtake Brazil as the highest-scoring team in World Cup tournament history and become the first team to reach eight World Cup finals. Miroslav Klose scored his 16th career World Cup goal and surpassed Brazil's own Ronaldo as the tournament's all-time record goalscorer. Brazil's loss broke their 62-match unbeaten streak at home in competitive matches, going back to the 1975 Copa América (where they lost 3–1 to Peru in the same stadium), and equalled their biggest margin of defeat in a match alongside a 6–0 loss to Uruguay in 1920. It was also Brazil's worst margin of defeat in a World Cup match, with their previous worst loss in that category being their 3–0 loss to France in the 1998 final at the Stade de France in Saint-Denis, Paris.

Ultimately, the match was described as a national humiliation. The game has been dubbed the Mineiraço ([minejˈɾasu]) in reference to the Mineirão stadium, evoking a previous "spirit of national shame" known as the Maracanaço in which Brazil unexpectedly lost in the de facto final of the 1950 FIFA World Cup on home soil to Uruguay. Brazil lost 3–0 to the Netherlands in the match for third place, while Germany went on to win the World Cup, winning 1–0 against Argentina in the final. This was Germany's fourth World Cup triumph, (Note: Germany previously won the 1954, 1974, and 1990 editions as West Germany) bringing them joint-second behind five-time winners Brazil, as well as the first European World Cup triumph in the Americas.

== Background ==
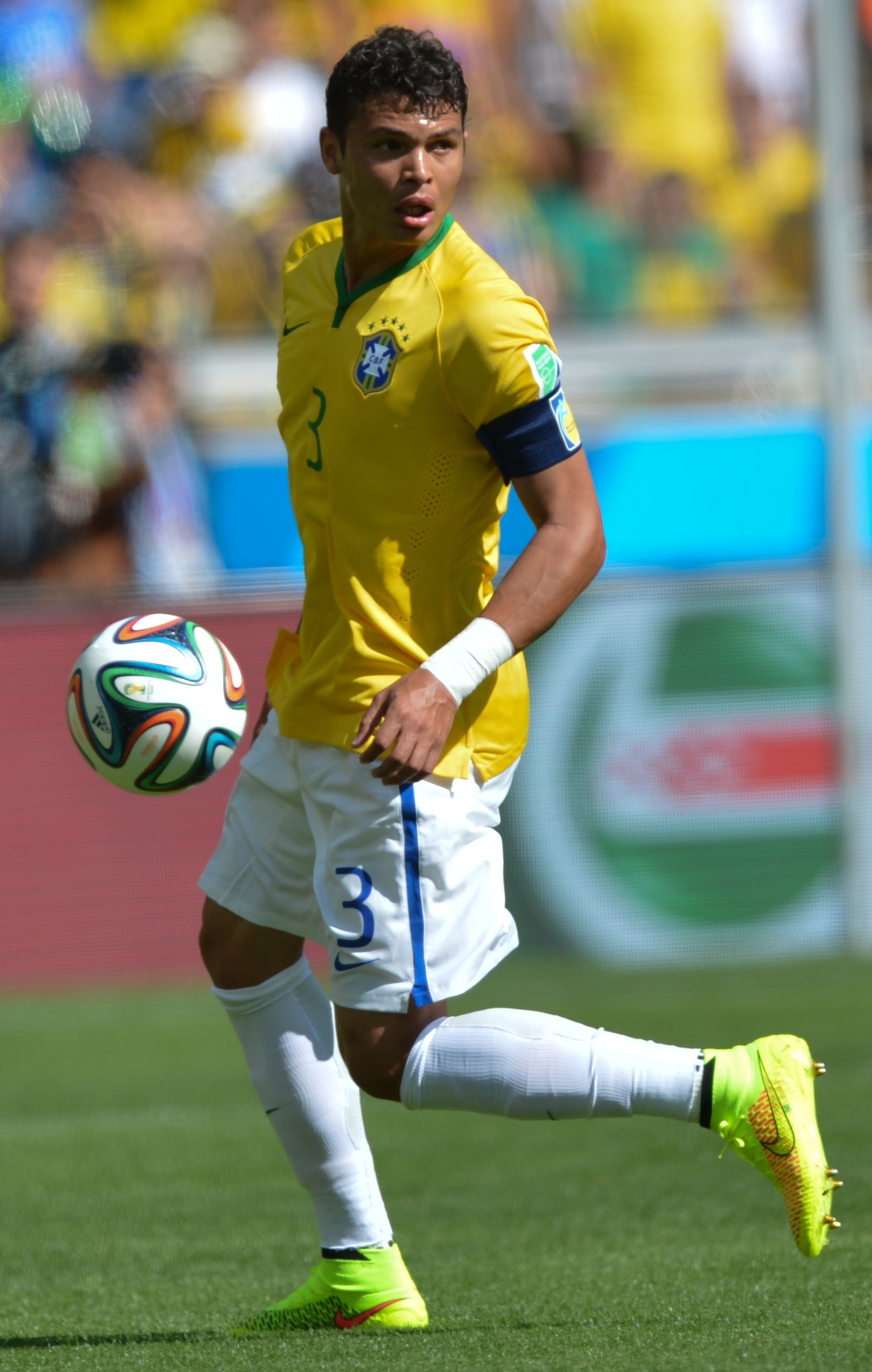
Brazil failed in their appeal to overturn captain Thiago Silva's suspension for the match.

Brazil were hosting the FIFA World Cup for the second time (the first being 1950), and had won the tournament on five previous occasions. Germany were three-time winners but had not won the tournament in 24 years. Brazil were in the semi-finals for the first time since 2002, from which they emerged victorious and subsequently won the tournament against Germany; while Germany were in a record-breaking fourth consecutive semi-final. Both teams had entered the tournament among the favourites to win, with Germany ranked 2nd and Brazil ranked 3rd in the FIFA World Rankings. It was only the second World Cup match between the two sides.

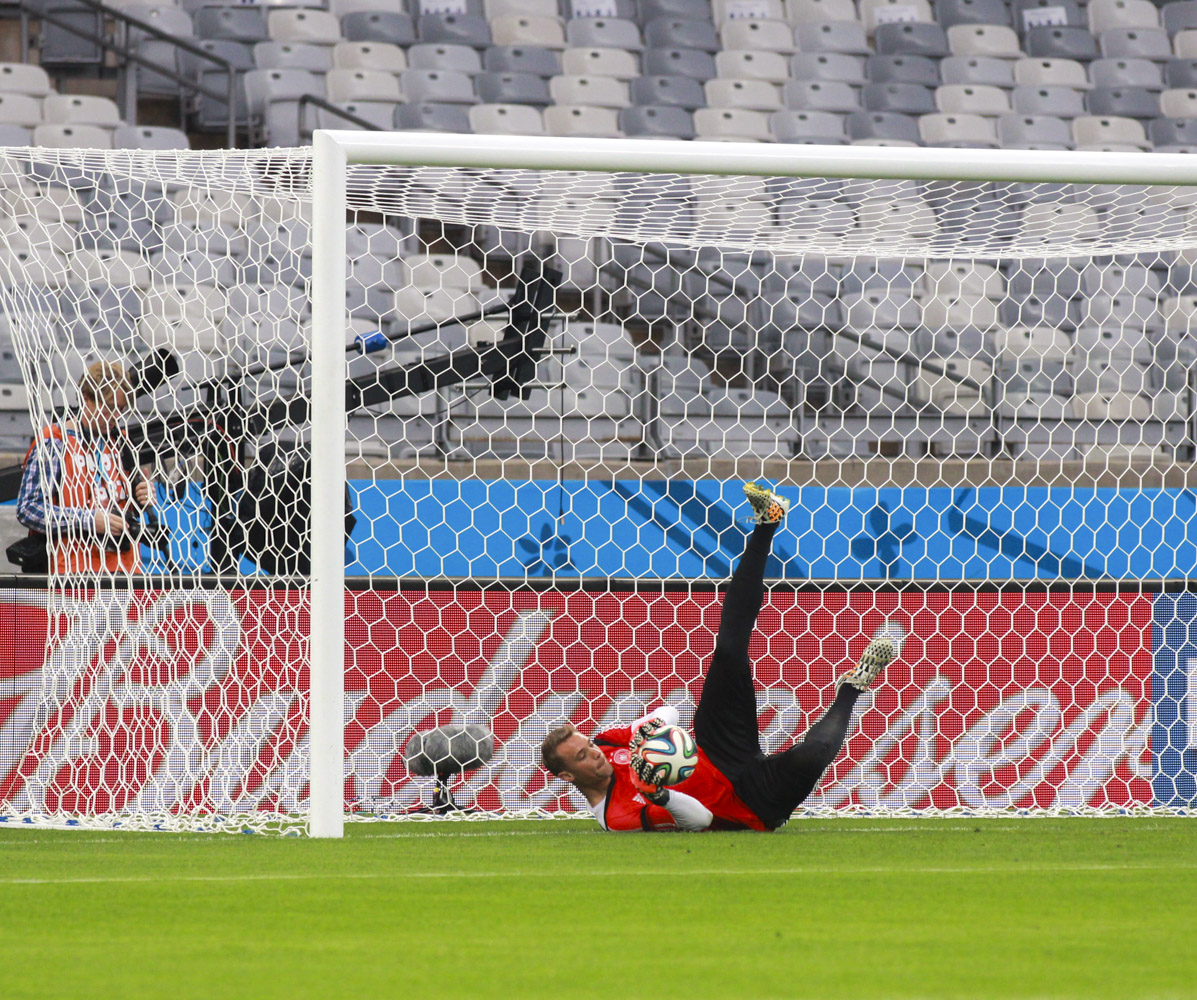
Germany's Manuel Neuer practising the day before the semi-final

Brazil's route to the semi-final included a group stage with Croatia, Mexico and Cameroon in Group A, from which they advanced with seven points before beating Chile in the Round of 16 in a penalty shoot-out, and Colombia in the quarter-finals. Germany had been drawn with Portugal, Ghana and the United States in Group G, and advanced with seven points before beating Algeria in the Round of 16 (after extra time) and France in the quarter-finals. The two teams had met in 21 previous matches, but their only previous encounter in the single-elimination round of the World Cup was the final of the 2002 FIFA World Cup that was a 2–0 victory for Brazil, which was Luiz Felipe Scolari's first tenure as manager of Brazil while Miroslav Klose was in Germany's starting lineup (being the only two remaining from that match). (Note: Brazil played East Germany in 1974, but FIFA—in line with the political and legal process of German reunification—considers the current Germany team to be identical with the former West Germany.)

Brazil defender and captain Thiago Silva was suspended for the match due to accumulation of yellow cards, despite an appeal against the suspension by the Brazilian Football Confederation. Forward Neymar was also unavailable for the match, having been sidelined for the rest of the tournament after suffering a fractured vertebra in the quarter-final match against Colombia. Dante and Bernard, making their first starts of the tournament, replaced Thiago Silva and Neymar respectively with Luiz Gustavo replacing Paulinho in defensive midfield. Germany were unchanged from their quarter-final. Goalkeeper Júlio César and stand-in captain David Luiz paid tribute to Neymar by holding his shirt during the national anthem ceremony. Even with the absences, analysts expected a close match, feeling the home crowd could provide an advantage for the hosts.

== Match ==
Both teams had reached the semi-finals undefeated in their previous matches of the tournament. The officiating team was led by Mexican referee Marco Antonio Rodríguez, in what would be the final match of his career.

=== Summary ===
==== First half ====
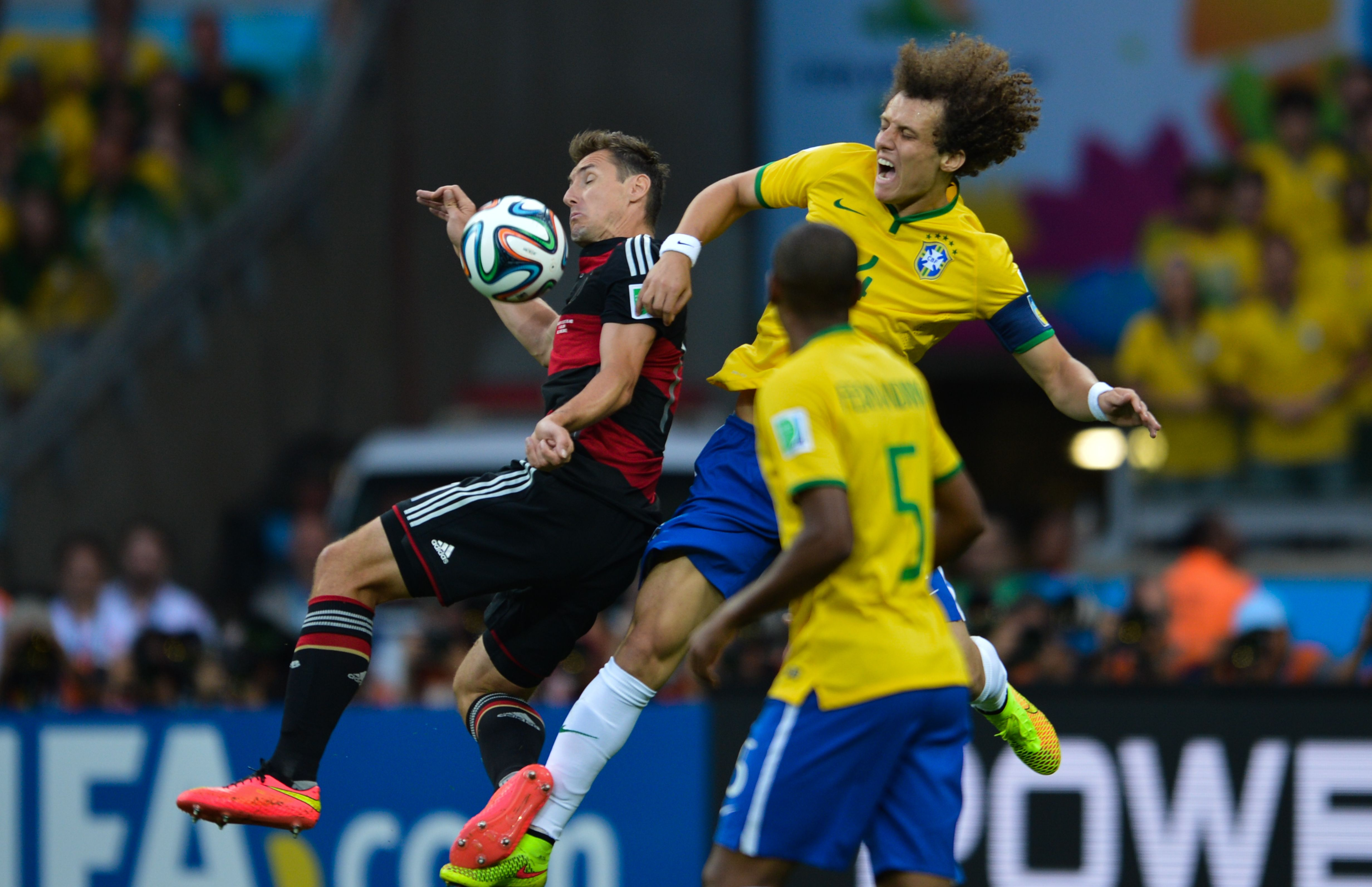
Brazil's captain David Luiz (back centre) led a defence that was incapable of stopping the Germans from scoring four goals in six minutes, starting with Miroslav Klose's (left) strike in the 23rd minute.

Both teams started with attacking play, with Brazilian Marcelo's shot going wide in the third minute and German Sami Khedira's shot in the seventh minute being inadvertently blocked by his teammate Toni Kroos. In the 11th minute, the Germans scored from their first corner of the game. Thomas Müller escaped his marker, David Luiz, in the penalty box, and Toni Kroos's delivery found him wide open for a side-footed shot into the net. In the following minutes, Brazil tried to respond, but their attacks came to nothing, although Philipp Lahm delivered a tackle to keep Marcelo from setting up a chance in the penalty box. Instead, in the 23rd minute, Germany scored again after Kroos and Müller combined to set up Miroslav Klose, who scored on the rebound after his initial shot was saved by goalkeeper Júlio César. This goal was Klose's 16th and final ever World Cup finals goal, passing the record he previously shared with Ronaldo, a Brazilian.

Klose's goal initiated a flurry of German scoring as Brazil lost control of the game. In the 24th minute, Kroos scored with a left-footed strike from the edge of the area after Lahm's cross was deflected. Then, in the 26th minute, just a few seconds after Brazil kicked off, Kroos caught Fernandinho in possession in his own half and played a one-two with Khedira before scoring again. Kroos's goals came just 69 seconds apart. Khedira himself scored in the 29th minute after exchanging passes with Mesut Özil. All five of Germany's first-half goals came within the first half-hour, with four of them coming in one six-minute period. In contrast, Brazil had no shots on target in the first half. Many Brazil supporters in the crowd were visibly in shock or reduced to tears, and many would leave the stadium before the second half. The resulting fights in the Mineirão stands forced the Military Police to send a special forces squad into the stadium.

==== Second half ====
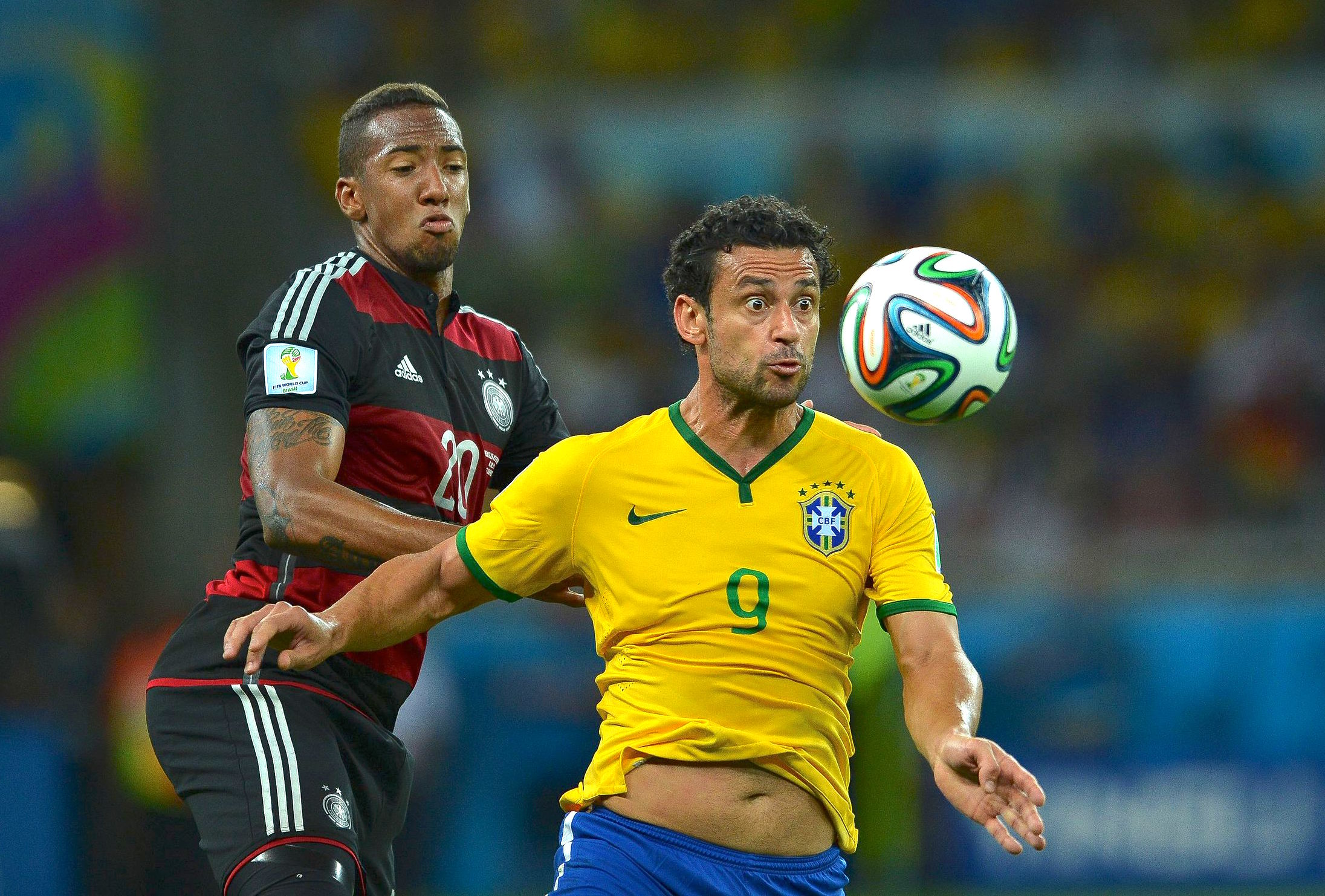
Brazil's forward Fred is challenged by Germany's defender Jérôme Boateng. Fred was heavily criticized for his performance and was booed by Brazilian fans when he was substituted.

Brazil's substitution of Paulinho for Fernandinho and Ramires for Hulk resulted in an improvement in their play after the restart; Germany goalkeeper Manuel Neuer saved shots in quick succession from Oscar, Paulinho and Fred. By the 60th minute, though, the Germans came close to scoring again, with Júlio César denying Müller twice. Another German goal nonetheless came in the 69th minute – Lahm's low cross found substitute André Schürrle, who side-footed the ball into the net from close range. Ten minutes later, Schürrle ran onto Müller's cross from the left and hit a powerful shot over César at the near post. At this point, with the score at 7–0, the remaining home fans gave the Germans a standing ovation, applauding both Schürrle's goal and Germany's overall performance. Close to the end, Özil received a through ball with just César to beat but missed his shot to make it an eighth goal. Seconds later, Oscar received a long ball and scored in the 90th minute to make it 7–1. The final score matched Brazil's worst loss (6–0 to Uruguay in 1920) and ended a run of 62 competitive home matches unbeaten for Brazil. The Brazilian players left the pitch in tears to a chorus of boos and jeers. (Note: Attributed to multiple sources:)

Toni Kroos was selected Man of the Match, with three shots, two goals, 93% pass accuracy, one assist and two chances created.

Brazilian striker Fred, who was replaced by Willian in the 70th minute, received a particularly hostile reaction from the home fans. According to Opta Sports, Fred failed to make a single tackle, cross, run or interception during the match, and actually spent the majority of his time in possession of the ball on the centre spot due to six restarts.

=== Details ===
8 July 2014
17:00 BRT (UTC−3)

Brazil	1–7	Germany
Oscar 89'		Müller 11'; Klose 23'; Kroos 24', 26'; Khedira 29'; Schürrle 69', 79'

Estádio Mineirão, Belo Horizonte
Attendance: 58,141
Referee: Marco Antonio Rodríguez (Mexico)

Brazil	Germany

GK	12	Júlio César
RB	23	Maicon
CB	4	David Luiz (c)
CB	13	Dante	(yellow card) 68'
LB	6	Marcelo
CM	17	Luiz Gustavo
CM	5	Fernandinho		(substituted off) 46'
RW	7	Hulk		(substituted off) 46'
AM	11	Oscar
LW	20	Bernard
CF	9	Fred		(substituted off) 70'
Substitutes:
GK	1	Jefferson
DF	2	Dani Alves
MF	8	Paulinho		(substituted on) 46'
DF	14	Maxwell
DF	15	Henrique
MF	16	Ramires		(substituted on) 46'
MF	18	Hernanes
MF	19	Willian		(substituted on) 70'
FW	21	Jô
GK	22	Victor
Manager:
Luiz Felipe Scolari

GK	1	Manuel Neuer
RB	16	Philipp Lahm (c)
CB	20	Jérôme Boateng
CB	5	Mats Hummels	(substituted off) 46'
LB	4	Benedikt Höwedes
CM	6	Sami Khedira	(substituted off) 76'
CM	7	Bastian Schweinsteiger
RW	13	Thomas Müller
AM	18	Toni Kroos
LW	8	Mesut Özil
CF	11	Miroslav Klose	(substituted off) 58'
Substitutes:
GK	12	Ron-Robert Zieler
DF	2	Kevin Großkreutz
DF	3	Matthias Ginter
FW	9	André Schürrle	(substituted on) 58'
FW	10	Lukas Podolski
MF	14	Julian Draxler	(substituted on) 76'
DF	15	Erik Durm
DF	17	Per Mertesacker	(substituted on) 46'
MF	19	Mario Götze
GK	22	Roman Weidenfeller
MF	23	Christoph Kramer
Manager:
Joachim Löw

Man of the Match:
Toni Kroos (Germany)

Assistant referees:
Marvin Torrentera (Mexico)
Marcos Quintero (Mexico)
Fourth official:
Mark Geiger (United States)
Fifth official:
Mark Hurd (United States)

Match rules:

- 90 minutes
- 30 minutes of extra-time if necessary
- Penalty shoot-out if scores still level
- Twelve named substitutes
- Maximum of three substitutions

=== Statistics ===
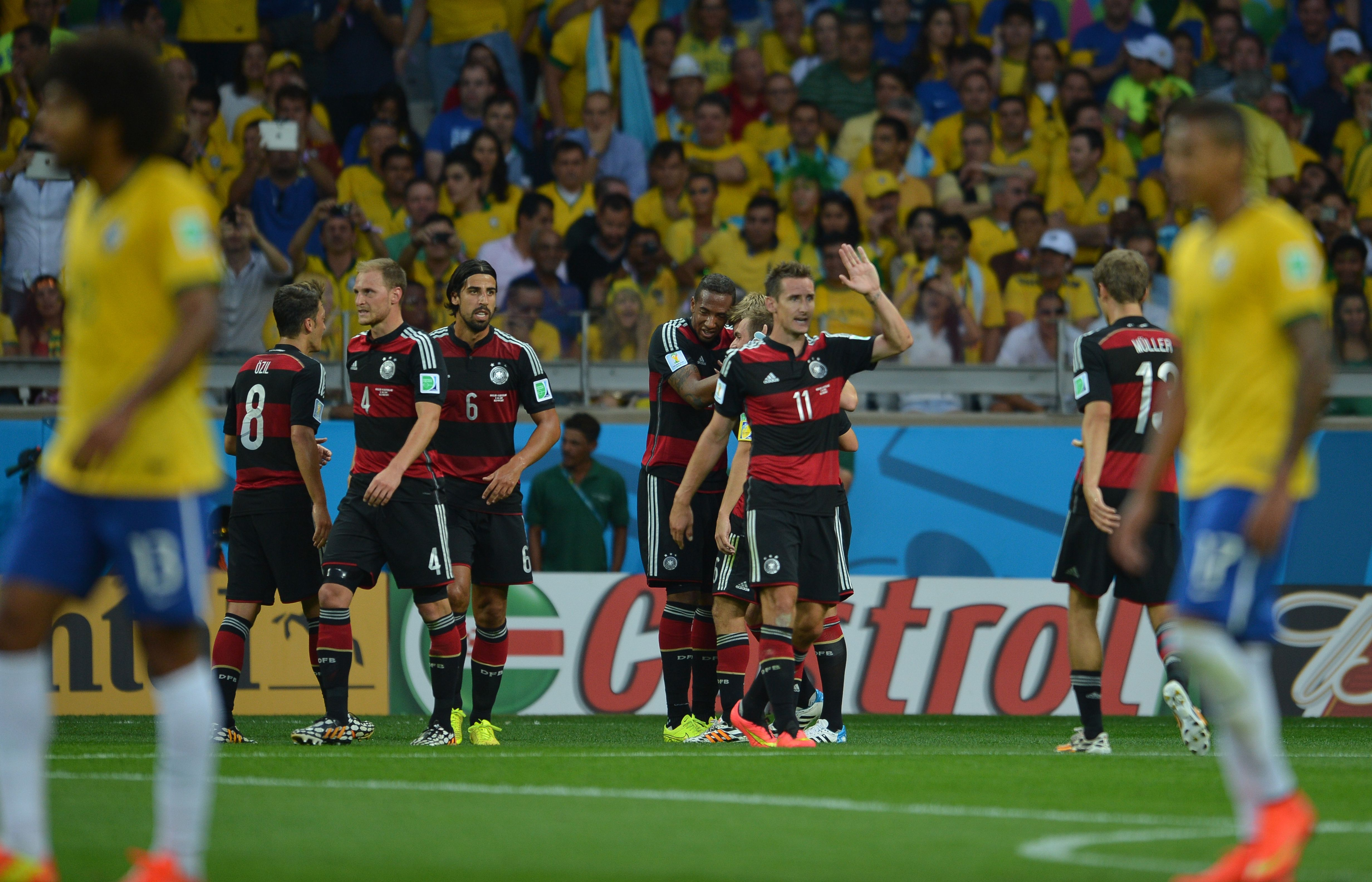
German players celebrating Toni Kroos' (back centre, obscured) first goal of the game

Statistic	Brazil	Germany
Goals scored	1	7
Total shots	18	14
Shots on target	8	10
Ball possession	52%	48%
Corner kicks	7	5
Fouls committed	11	14
Offsides	3	0
Yellow cards	1	0
Red cards	0	0

== Records ==
The game's result was the biggest winning margin in a World Cup semi-final or final. The outcome was also the worst loss by a host country in World Cup history, as the six-goal difference doubled the previous record margin. By the end of the game, a total of 167 goals had been scored at the 2014 World Cup, the 2nd-most at a single World Cup, after 1998 with 171 goals. With 18 total shots on target, the match had the joint-most shots on target of any match in 90 minutes at the 2014 World Cup. The match also had the fastest four goals scored in World Cup history, with Germany scoring in the span of six minutes (from 23′ to 29′); in 1954, Austria took seven minutes (25′ to 32′) and in 1982, Hungary also took seven minutes (69′ to 76′) to score four goals. Germany equalled the record for most goals scored against the host nation of the World Cup, with Austria defeating Switzerland 7–5 in the 1954 World Cup. Germany also overtook Brazil to become the all-time highest-scoring team in FIFA World Cup history, their total of 223 at full-time passing Brazil's 221. Before the match Brazil and Germany were even with seven World Cup finals each; the German victory made them the only squad to reach 8 finals.

For Brazil, the result became one of their two worst losses, equalling a 6–0 defeat to Uruguay in Valparaíso in 1920, and was their worst defeat at home; their previous worst defeat at home was a 5–1 defeat by Argentina in Rio de Janeiro in 1939. The loss broke Brazil's 62-match home unbeaten streak in competitive matches, dating back to their 1–3 loss to Peru in the 1975 Copa América; this match was also played at Estádio Mineirão in Belo Horizonte. The last time Brazil had lost a World Cup semi-final was in 1938, in a dramatic game against Italy in Marseille, and had emerged victorious from this stage the previous six times they had reached it, since the loss in 1974 against Netherlands was not formally a semi-final. Brazil had never before conceded seven goals at home, although they once conceded eight goals in an 8–4 friendly defeat to Yugoslavia on 3 June 1934; the last time they conceded at least five was in a 6–5 win in the 1938 World Cup versus Poland; at least four was in a 4–2 defeat at the 1954 World Cup against Hungary. Brazil's largest losing deficit at the World Cup prior to the match was three goals, which came in the 3–0 defeat to France in the 1998 final. The game's outcome also marked Brazil's worst result against Germany, surpassing a 2–0 defeat in a 1986 friendly.

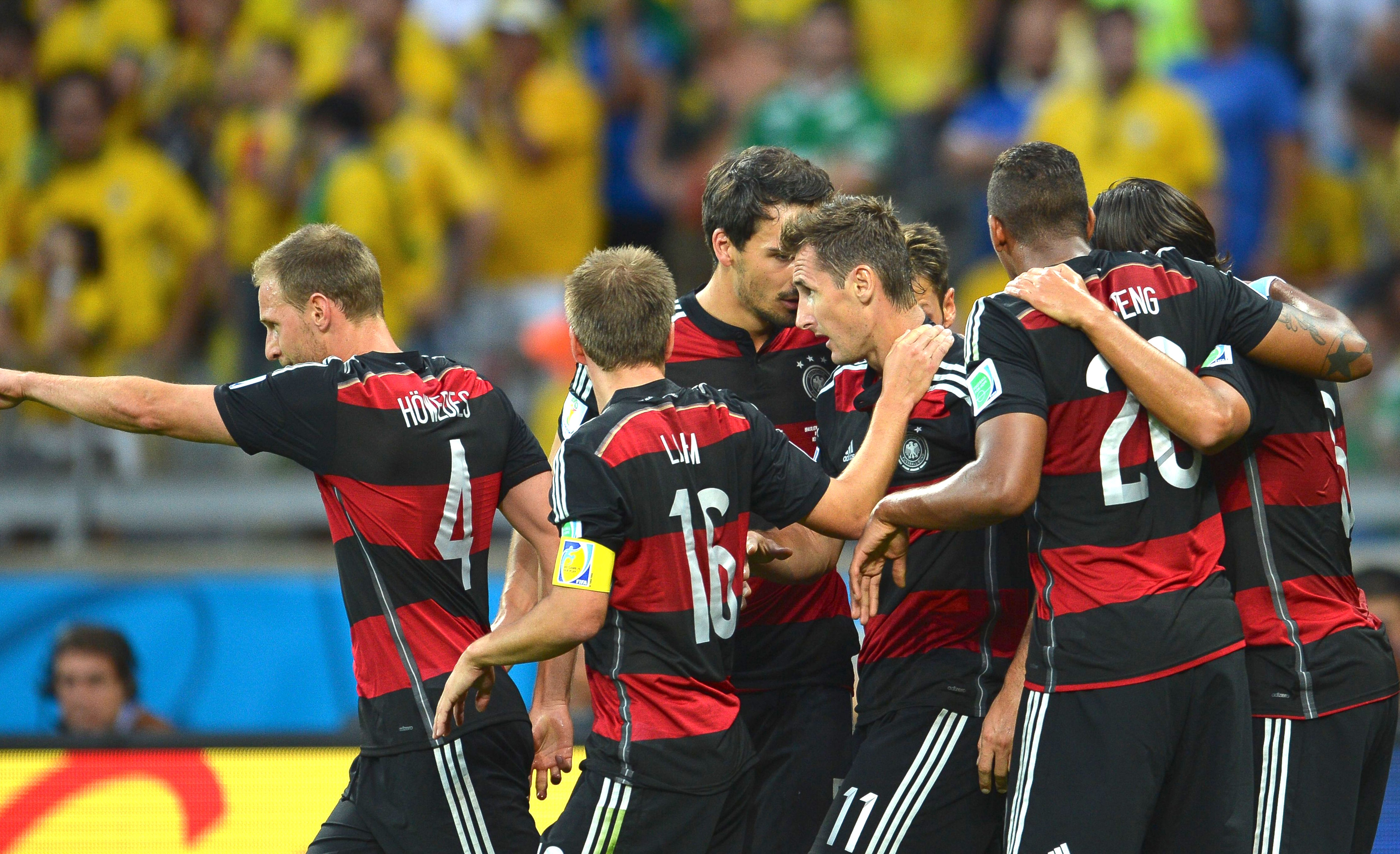
Germany celebrate after striker Miroslav Klose (centre, number 11) scored a record 16th World Cup goal, putting his team 2–0 up against Brazil.

For Germany, the final result meant that, for the fourth consecutive time, they were positioned among the tournament's top three teams; moreover, the victory allowed the Germans to become the first side to reach eight World Cup finals. Germany became the first team to score 7 goals in a World Cup semi-final. The last time a team scored six goals was West Germany in 1954 versus Austria, same as in both semi-finals in 1930. Only two teams have previously trailed by at least five goals at half-time: Zaire (versus Yugoslavia in 1974) and Haiti (versus Poland in 1974). The seven goals scored by Germany reflected a better goal-scoring record in the World Cup finals than that of 28 other nations in their respective history of the World Cup.

Germany's Miroslav Klose equalled the Brazilian Cafu as the player with the most matches being on the winning side at the World Cup, with 16 victories. Klose played his 23rd World Cup match, equalling Paolo Maldini in 2nd place for most World Cup matches, with only Lothar Matthäus remaining with more (25). Klose has played in more knockout games than Matthäus or Cafu – 13, and also became the only player to take part in four World Cup semi-finals (Uwe Seeler previously played in three semi-finals). In the match, he broke the record for the most goals scored at the World Cup with 16, overtaking Brazil's Ronaldo's total of 15; Ronaldo was in attendance at the match as a TV Globo's commentator. Thomas Müller's goal was Germany's 2,000th in the history of their national team. Toni Kroos' first-half double scored in 69 seconds was the fastest brace scored in World Cup history by the same player. This was also the fifth time that Germany defeated the host nation of tournament, after Chile in 1962, Spain in 1982, Mexico in 1986 and South Korea in 2002 (this also in a semi-final).

== Reactions ==
=== Professional ===
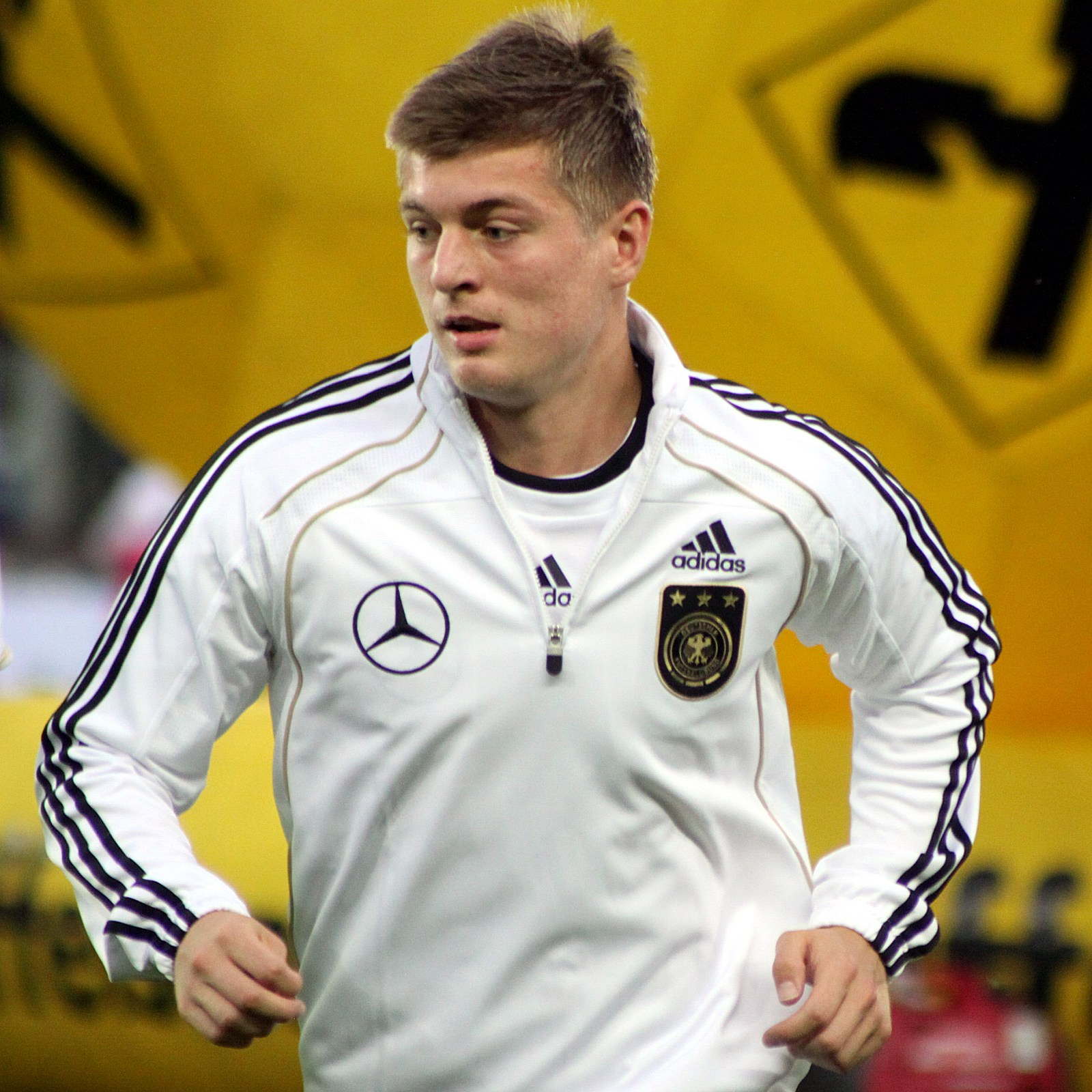
Man of the Match Toni Kroos. His two goals in 69 seconds were the fastest brace in the history of the FIFA World Cup. He would later express sorrow on behalf of his defeated adversaries, considering them "not in their best performance".

According to reports, after Sami Khedira scored the fifth goal for the German team, Neymar (who was watching the match on television in his home in Guarujá, Brazil) switched off his set and went to play poker. World Cup-winning Brazil manager Luiz Felipe Scolari said the result was the "worst loss by a Brazilian national team ever" and accepted all responsibility for the defeat. He called it "the worst day of [his] life", and resigned after the tournament. Stand-in captain David Luiz and goalkeeper Júlio César both offered apologies to the people of Brazil. Fred, who was booed by Brazilian fans during the match, said it was the worst defeat in his and his teammates' careers. He later announced his retirement from international football following the tournament. Recovering from his injury, Neymar expressed his support to his teammates and, despite the 7–1 score, said he was proud to be a part of the team.

During the match, the German team seemed to realise that what was unfolding was not a normal football event. In a post-match statement, Mats Hummels said that the German team had decided that they did not want to humiliate the Brazilians during the second half and after the match:

We just made it clear that we had to stay focused and not try to humiliate them. We said we had to stay serious and concentrate at half-time. That's something you don't have to show on the pitch if you are playing. You have to show the opponent respect and it was very important that we did this and didn't try to show some magic or something like this. It was important we played our game for 90 minutes.

Accordingly, the Germans cut theatrics from their goal celebrations; arms were raised but there was no jumping or screaming after scoring. Coach Joachim Löw stated his team had "a clear, persistent game-plan", and as they realised Brazil were "cracking up", they took advantage as in contrast to the Brazilians' nervousness the German players were "extremely cool". Toni Kroos, who was chosen as Man of the Match, added that as the Germans felt that in "no game of the Cup, [the Brazilians] played their best", the squad entered with the tactical knowledge on how to counter Brazil: "we took all the balls, and scored the goals". Müller said he was "shocked by just how open Brazil were" as "Gustavo, Luiz, Dante, Fernandinho and Marcelo were shambolic in their positioning", being confused and disorganized, noting that his German teammates benefited overwhelmingly as "the spaces were bigger than against defence-minded teams".

Löw also declared the team had "no euphoria" during or after the game, as they knew that the 7–1 win meant nothing for the upcoming final, saying "We didn't celebrate. We were happy, but we still have a job to do".

Following the match, the German players and managers offered words of consolation to the Brazilians. Löw and players Per Mertesacker and Philipp Lahm even compared the pressure on the Brazilian team and resulting heartbreaking defeat with Germany's own when they hosted the 2006 FIFA World Cup and also lost in the semi-finals. Lahm added in an interview after the tournament that he had felt "very uneasy" during the match and "not at all euphoric" since the Brazilian team had made mistakes that "don't usually happen at this level", and Mertesacker noted that despite featuring the Germans at the top of their game, "even from the bench, [the semi-final] was crazy to watch". Kroos stated that, despite Brazil having good players, "they couldn't show their best performance" due to all the outside pressure, and expressed faith in "them returning with a good squad". Löw observed in the immediate aftermath of the match that the Brazilian people were applauding his team. Later the Brazilian newspaper O Globo expressed appreciation for the gestures of the German players, calling them "world champions of sympathy".

Brazilian footballing icon Pelé tweeted, "I always said that football is a box of surprises. Nobody in this world expected this result," followed by, "[Brazil] Will try to get the sixth title in Russia. Congratulations to Germany." Carlos Alberto Torres, the captain of Brazil's winning team in 1970, said that the country lost due to a "feeling of 'we've already won'". He added that "Germany played how I like to see and Scolari's tactics for this match were suicidal". In contrast, Argentinian icon Diego Maradona was seen singing a song mocking the Brazilian defeat.

=== Society ===
In Germany, the match's coverage by ZDF set a record for the country's most watched TV broadcast, with 32.57 million viewers (87.8% of all viewers), beating the Germany–Spain match at the 2010 World Cup. This record was beaten five days later with the final. In contrast, despite a weekly spike in audience, the broadcast by Brazilian TV Globo saw the viewers total fall with each German goal.

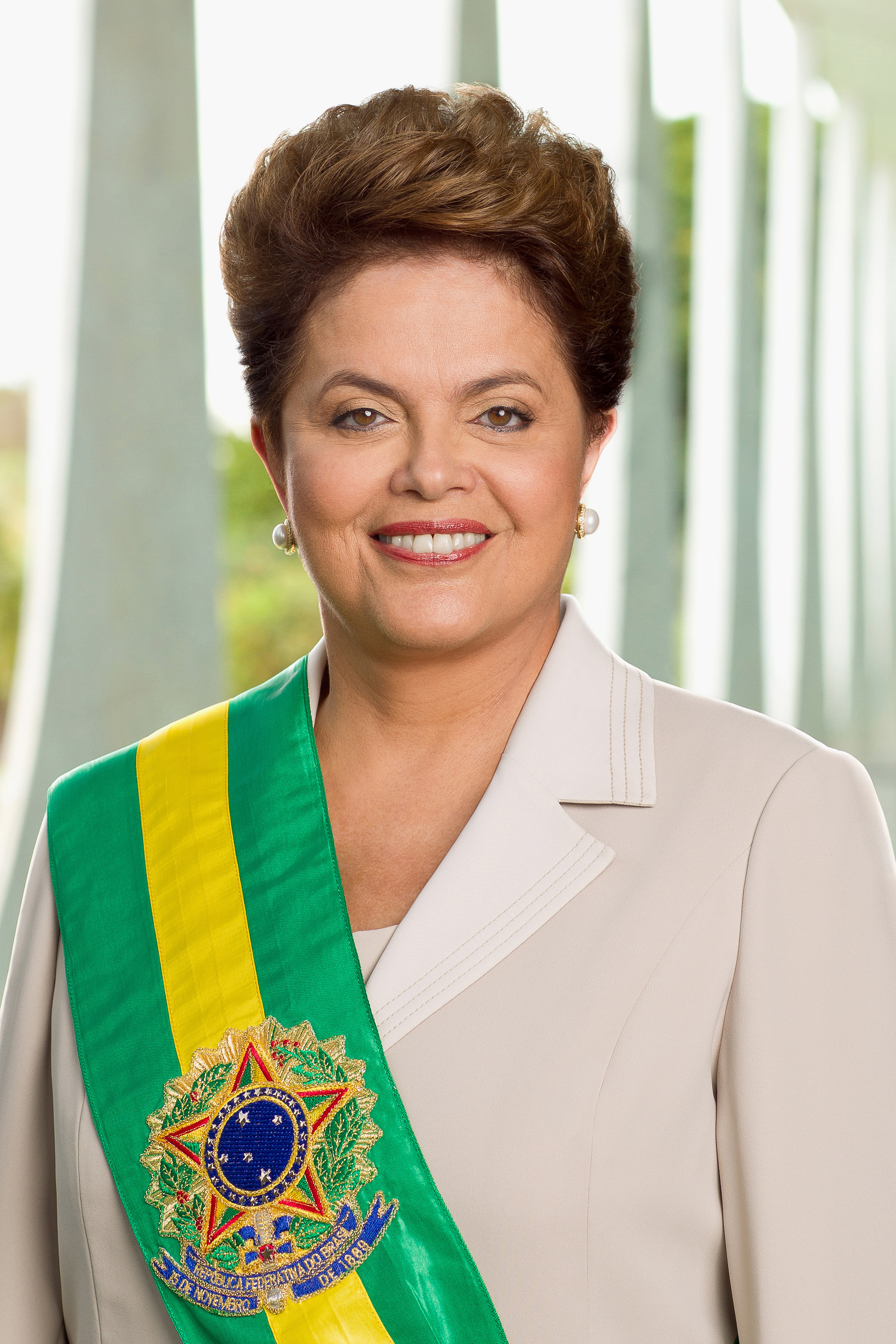
Brazil's defeat was lamented by the nation's president, Dilma Rousseff.

The match was the most discussed sports game on Twitter with over 35.6 million tweets, surpassing Super Bowl XLVIII, with 24.9 million tweets during the game. At first inventive hashtags such as "#PrayForBrazil" were common, but once Germany built a 5–0 lead Brazilian users instead lent their frustration into self-deprecatory humor, comparing Germany's goals with the Volkswagen Gol car and stating the Brazilian team looked like "11 Freds". Other Twitter users compared Germany's dominating performance to their military efforts during World War II and the Holocaust, for example, dubbing it the "Goalocaust". Bung Moktar Radin, a member of parliament of Malaysia, came under heavy criticism from the Malaysian public and the German ambassador, Holger Michael, for posting such a comment. Many comments had derisive sexual connotations, like "Brazilian team decided to file a case in the court against Germany for gang rape." Pornhub issued a plea to stop uploading highlight videos of the match under ironic titles such as "Young Brazilians get fucked by entire German soccer team."

The President of Brazil, Dilma Rousseff, stated on Twitter following the match that "like all Brazilians, I am deeply saddened by our loss." The Israeli Ministry of Foreign Affairs spokesperson, Yigal Palmor, mentioned the match when countering Brazil's claim that his country was using disproportionate force in the Gaza conflict, saying "This is not football. In football, when a game ends in a draw, you think it is proportional, but when it finishes 7–1 it's disproportionate."

Due to the pressure on the home nation Brazil, who were odds-on favorites to win the World Cup, and the shock of the loss, the media and FIFA dubbed the game the Mineirazo (Mineiraço in Brazil), meaning "The Mineirão blow", evoking the Maracanazo (Maracanaço) in which Brazil were defeated on home soil by outsiders Uruguay in the de facto final of the 1950 World Cup. Tereza Borba Barbosa, daughter of goalkeeper Moacir Barbosa who was scapegoated for the 1950 defeat, said the loss was enough to redeem her father's legacy, while Uruguayan striker Alcides Ghiggia, responsible for the Cup-winning goal of the Maracanazo, felt that though both games were traumatic they could not be compared as the 1950 match had more at stake. Following the match, German fans were escorted out of the stadium by police and police were put on alert for possible riots. Observers noted that while the German supporters had shown respect to the defeated hosts, Argentinian fans were celebrating Brazil's elimination.

There were reports of a mass robbery at a fan party in Rio de Janeiro and of fans setting fire to Brazilian flags in the streets of São Paulo even before the match was over. A number of buses were burned across São Paulo and an electronics store was looted.

=== Media ===
Brazilian newspapers greeted the result with headlines such as "The Biggest Shame in History" (Lance!), a "Historical humiliation" (Folha de S.Paulo) and "Brazil is slain" (O Globo). In Germany, Bild proclaimed, 7:1 Wahnsinn! DFB-Team mit Blitz-K.o. gegen Brasilien (7–1 Madness! DFB team score flash knockout against Brazil), with a front-page headline of Ohne Worte (Without Words). In France, L'Équipe's headline simply said, Le Désastre (The Disaster). Writing for Sky Sports, Matthew Stanger described the game as the "ultimate embarrassment", while Miguel Delaney of ESPN referred to the match as the Mineirazo, echoing the term invented for the event by the South American Spanish language press.

Barney Ronay in The Guardian described it as "the most humiliating World Cup host nation defeat of all time", and Joe Callaghan of The Independent described it as "the darkest night in Brazil's footballing history". Wyre Davies, the BBC's Rio de Janeiro correspondent, said of Brazilian's reactions at the stadium and fan parks, "The collective sense of shock, embarrassment and national humiliation across Brazil was impossible to ignore". Football journalist Tim Vickery postulated that the result might be the catalyst for overdue reform of Brazilian club football, which in his opinion had become complacent in comparison to other countries, resting on the laurels of the national team's history of success. In his words, this was a chance to "recapture parts of its historic identity and reframe them in a modern, global context". Reporters compared the result with the Maracanazo that cost Brazil a title at home in 1950, with the Brazilian media even considering that the 2014 defeat redeemed the 1950 squad.

Analysts deconstructed all the tactical and technical deficiencies that led to the one-sided victory. Scolari still relied on the team that won the 2013 FIFA Confederations Cup despite many players going through dry spells, and most of them not having any World Cup experience. Neymar was such a focal point that the team barely trained any formations without him. In his absence, Scolari replaced Neymar with Bernard to maintain the attacking tradition of Brazilian football, instead of the "'logical call' [which] was surely to bring in an extra midfielder" against the Germans. The assistant coaches even supported bringing in the more defensive-minded Ramires and Willian. Thus, Fernandinho and Luiz Gustavo were overwhelmed by the Germany midfield trio of Toni Kroos, Sami Khedira and Bastian Schweinsteiger. The defense that had already been questioned in previous games collapsed as Dante was proven to be an inadequate replacement for the suspended Silva, while David Luiz made uncharacteristic errors during the semi-final. Other errors included setting up Marcelo for a more attacking style of play, tasking Gustavo with covering for Marcelo on defense, and playing Fred, often regarded as a tactical striker, in a goal-scoring role where he was ineffective.

== Aftermath ==
As a result of being eliminated in the semi-finals, Brazil played in the match for third place at the Estádio Nacional Mané Garrincha in Brasília, and never played at their home stadium of the Maracanã in Rio de Janeiro for the entire tournament despite being hosts. Brazil finished fourth after being defeated 3–0 in the match for third place by the Netherlands on 12 July, where two of the three goals were conceded in the first 17 minutes. The defeat meant that Brazil had conceded a total of 14 goals throughout the tournament, which was the most they had conceded in a single tournament, the most conceded by a World Cup host, and the most conceded by any team since Belgium allowed 15 during the 1986 tournament. Germany went on to win the World Cup for the fourth time and the first as a unified nation, after defeating Argentina 1–0 in extra time in the final on 13 July at the Maracanã. Germany had the support of the Brazilian crowd despite having eliminated the home team, given Brazil has a long-standing football rivalry with neighbours Argentina.

The two consecutive losses, Brazil's first consecutive home defeats since 1940, led to coach Scolari's resignation on 15 July. Two weeks later, the Brazilian Football Confederation brought back Dunga as head coach of the Brazil national team. He had managed the team from 2006 until 2010, being dismissed following a 2–1 loss to the Netherlands in the 2010 FIFA World Cup quarter-finals. He was dismissed for a second time, following Brazil crashing out at the group stage of the Copa América Centenario in the United States two years later.

In 2014, shortly after the match, a humorous website, named "Brasilalemanhaeterno" (eternal Brazil and Germany), was created in Brazil that continuously counted the score as though the match had never ended, serving as an online joke about the result.

The Brazil senior team did not play a match at the Estádio Mineirão again until a 3–0 win over Argentina in a World Cup qualifier in November 2016.

Brazil and Germany's next meeting in a major tournament was two years later when their under-23 teams faced each other in the gold medal match of the 2016 Summer Olympics' men's tournament at the Maracanã as Rio de Janeiro hosted the Games. Both opposing coaches — Rogério Micale for Brazil and Horst Hrubesch for Germany — downplayed the fact that the gold medal match was a rematch of the World Cup semi-final, but some fans viewed the Olympic final as a chance for revenge and redemption. Brazil won on penalties to win its first Olympic football gold medal after the match finished 1–1 after both normal time and extra time, with Neymar scoring the winning penalty.

The next time Brazil and Germany faced each other again at senior level was a friendly at the Olympiastadion in Berlin on 27 March 2018; Brazil won 1–0 on a first half goal from Gabriel Jesus.

Almost 12 years after the match, on 14 June 2026, Germany would win another World Cup match by the same score, this time at their first match of the 2026 World Cup against Curaçao at the NRG Stadium in Houston, Texas, United States.

In Brazil, the result, "7–1" (Portuguese: sete a um), has become a metaphor for a devastating and crushing defeat, while "Goal for Germany" (Portuguese: gol da Alemanha) is used as an exclamation after a mishap.

The phrases "Todo dia um novo 7 a 1" (Every day a new 7–1) and "Todo dia um 7 a 1 diferente" (Every day a different 7–1) became widely used in Brazil to symbolize that something judged to be very bad or negative just happened or is currently happening.

== See also ==
- 2014 FIFA World Cup knockout stage
- List of FIFA World Cup records and statistics
- Brazil at the FIFA World Cup
- Germany at the FIFA World Cup
