= Malyon =

Malyon is an English surname. Notable people with the surname include:

- Ed Malyon, British journalist
- Eily Malyon (1879–1961), English actress
