= Off the Ball =

Off the Ball may refer to:

- Off the ball, a term used in football, usually associated with a player's action when not in possession of the ball
- Off the Ball (radio series), a radio show broadcast on BBC Radio Scotland
- Off the Ball (media company), an Irish media company
