= Second Captains Live =

Irish sports and entertainment tv show

- Genre: Sport; Entertainment
- Presented by: Eoin McDevitt; Ken Early; Ciarán Murphy
- Theme music composer: Hermitage Green
- Opening theme: Golden Rule
- Country of origin: Ireland
- Original language: English
- No. of seasons: 5
- No. of episodes: 28

Production
- Production location: RTE Studios
- Camera setup: Multi-camera
- Running time: 1 Hour

Original release
- Network: RTÉ Two
- Release: 10 September 2013 – October 2016

Related
- Second Captains

Second Captains Live was an Irish live topical sports and entertainment show produced and presented by Second Captains that first aired on RTÉ Two television in Ireland on 10 September 2013 at 10.30pm.

Each week, Irish sports stars joined the presenters to discuss their careers and the week's major sports stories. The show was filmed before a live studio audience and was the television debut of the award-winning team behind the Off The Ball sports programme on Newstalk, Eoin McDevitt, Ken Early, Ciarán Murphy, Simon Hick and Mark Horgan. Live music at the start and end of the programme was provided by Hermitage Green.

In August 2013, three months after their online radio show with the Irish Times show began, Second Captains made a not-for-broadcast pilot for RTÉ television. Soon after, they were commissioned for a four-show run on RTÉ 2 in September/October 2013. The first broadcast was scheduled to coincide with a vital World Cup qualifying match between Ireland and Austria, going on immediately after the live coverage of the game. Thereafter the show reverted to Wednesday nights. Second Captains Live was enthusiastically received by audiences, the Irish Independent calling it "sports broadcasting of the highest quality" and the Irish Times describing it as "ridiculously fabulous". The series was nominated for an IFTA award in 2015.

== Format ==
Second Captains Live was hosted by McDevitt, with Early and Murphy sharing co-hosting duties. Mark Horgan is the series producer, with Hick acting as producer and making some on-screen appearances. The show was divided into three parts – the first part is a panel discussion between three current or former sports stars on a particular topic broadly analogous to the big news of that week and touching on their own experiences. The second part was an interview with a main guest (e.g. Ronan O'Gara on episode 1). The third part is a quiz between one of the guests and Murphy, called Challenge Second Captains, playing on Ciaran's previous experiences of competing on old RTÉ school quiz-shows Blackboard Jungle and Gridlock. The show was influenced by Fantasy Football League, TFI Friday and Nighthawks. The show was shot completely live in front of a studio audience, and in between the interviews, RTÉ archive was used extensively, often for comedic purposes. It was described on the RTÉ website as "the place in Irish television where sport meets entertainment". Second Captains Live was directed by Maurice Linnane, whose work also includes the popular music programme Other Voices.

== Guests ==
Guests on series one included O'Gara, Sonia O'Sullivan, Colm Cooper, Mark Rohan, Derval O'Rourke, Jerry Flannery, Dónal Óg Cusack and staples from the podcasts such as Horgan, Sadlier and McConville. Series two of the show began on 12 March 2014 and guests included Neil Lennon and Six Nations winners Joe Schmidt and Gordon D'Arcy, as well as Pádraig Harrington, Niall Quinn and Peter Canavan. Series three featured Henry Shefflin, Graeme Souness, Paul McGrath, Anthony Daly, Paul Galvin, Kieran Donaghy, Anthony Tohill amongst others. Brian O'Driscoll, Ciarán McDonald, Johnny Sexton, Luke Fitzgerald, Andy Lee and Liam Brady were the main guests on series four. Series five featured, among others, Jim McGuinness, Barry McGuigan, Noel McGrath, Richie Hogan, Tony Cascarino and Kevin Moran.

== The Good Wall ==
The Good Wall is a feature on the show where the top ten Irish sportspeople of all-time are chosen by Second Captains contributors. Each week, the programmes major guests can make one change to the existing wall, and introduce a new sportsperson to the top ten. O'Gara made a stir when he removed former team-mate O'Driscoll from the top spot in show 1. O'Sullivan subsequently removed Irish golfer Pádraig Harrington from the wall entirely.
