= Off the Ball (media company) =

Irish media company

Off The Ball
- Type: Media company
- Owned by: Bauer Media Audio Ireland
- Founded: 2002
- Headquarters: Dublin, Ireland
- Language: English
- Website: www.otbsports.com

Availability
- Radio: 106–108 FM (Ireland)
- Digital: Facebook, YouTube, Periscope, OTB Sports app

OTB Sports (formerly known as Off the Ball) is an Irish media company, comprising a podcast network, website, daily radio show on nationwide broadcaster Newstalk 106-108fm and web-based live digital broadcast. It is on air seven days a week.

Primarily a sports news review, opinion and analysis show, it has also produced video documentaries on sporting topics.

== Format ==
OTB Sports broadcasts a three-hour long sports review and analysis show from 7pm on Monday to Thursday on Newstalk, nationwide across Ireland and online. The show is also live from 7pm on Friday for two hours, and from 1pm on Saturday and Sunday for five hours.

OTB AM, which launched in October 2017, is a digital sports news review and discussion show. It is available on various platforms including YouTube, Facebook and on the OTB Sports app.

It is presented Monday to Thursday by Ger Gilroy and Colm Boohig, and on Friday by Shane Hannon and Boohig. Regulars include Alan Quinlan, Ronan O'Gara, Daniel Harris, Graham Hunter, Anthony Moyles, Andy Mitten, Kieran Donaghy, Tommy Walsh and more.

=== Features ===
Regular slots on the radio show include:

- Monday Night Rugby
- Wednesday Night Rugby
- Friday Night Racing
- Football with John Giles
- The Football Show
- The Crappy Quiz
- The Saturday Panel
- The Sunday Papers

== Hosts ==
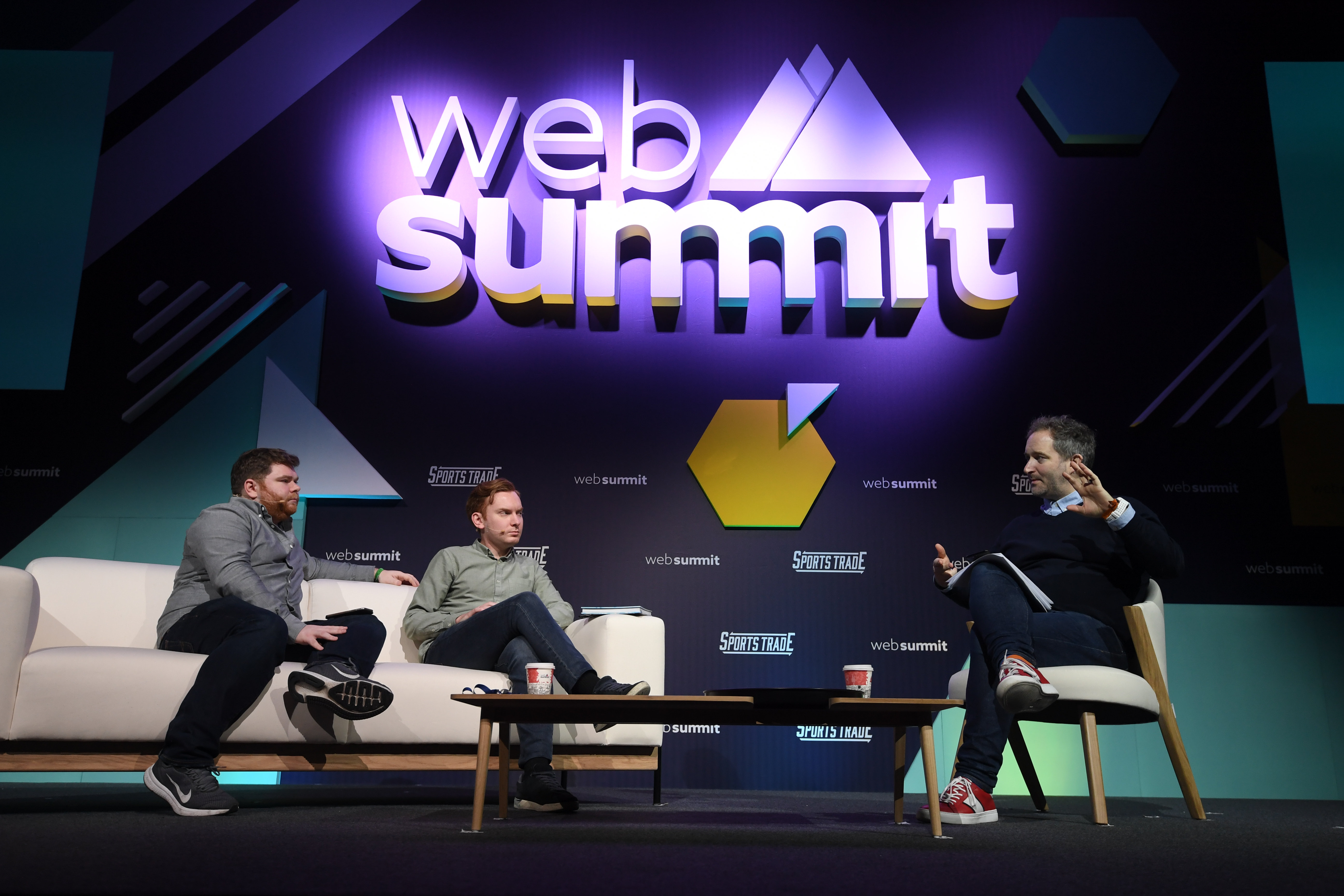
Off the Ball contributor Darren Cleary (left), with hosts Eoin Sheahan (centre) and Ger Gilroy (right) at the 2018 Web Summit

- Joe Molloy
- Ger Gilroy
- Adrian Barry
- Dave McIntyre
- Nathan Murphy
- Eoin Sheahan
- Will O'Callaghan
- Michael McCarthy
- Richie McCormack
- Arthur O'Dea
- Jack Cosgrove
- John Duggan
- Kevin Kilbane
- Brian O'Driscoll

Regular guest hosts on the show include former Ireland football international and manager John Giles, swimmer Ellen Keane, former Ireland and Munster player Keith Wood and former middleweight World champion Andy Lee.

== History ==
The first episode of the radio show aired in April 2002, featuring on Newstalk which had just commenced broadcasting as an independent local radio station with a franchise for Dublin.

Newstalk also offered weekend sports programming under various titles, including Sport Saturday and Sunday. These programs eventually changed their name to Off The Ball to reflect the connection with the weekday programming in 2013.

In 2004, Off The Ball became radio commentary rights holders for the Premier League in Ireland, and extended the deal in 2016 for a further three seasons.

In 2006, presenter Ger Gilroy moved to the morning breakfast show alongside Claire Byrne, with Eoin McDevitt joining Ken Early and Ciaran Murphy as the core weeknight presenting team. In March 2013, McDevitt, Early and Murphy resigned, along with producers Mark Horgan and Simon Hick, eventually joining The Irish Times under the name of Second Captains. Presenters Joe Molloy and Dave McIntyre increased their presence on weekday programming, while Adrian Barry and Colm Parkinson joined the team shortly afterwards.

The weeknight programme is the leading show on Irish radio in its time slot, with 53,000 listeners according to JNLR figures as of October 2017.

== Awards ==
Irish Music Rights Organisation Radio Awards (formerly PPI Radio Awards)

- 2009: Eoin McDevitt, Sports Broadcaster (Gold)
- 2011: Off The Ball, Sports Programme (Gold)
- 2012: Eoin McDevitt, Sports Broadcaster (Gold)
- 2013: Ger Gilroy, Sports Broadcaster (Gold)
- 2014: Joe Molloy, Sports Broadcaster (Gold)
- 2015: Joe Molloy, Sports Broadcaster (Gold) and Off The Ball, Sports Programme (Gold)
- 2016: Joe Molloy, Sports Broadcaster (Gold) and Team 33, Sports Programme (Gold)
- 2017: Ger Gilroy, Sports Broadcaster (Gold) and Off The Ball Weekday, Sports Programme (Gold)

== Other media ==
The first part of the on-air radio show, which consists of a look through the sporting stories of the day, was also available on terrestrial television until late 2017. The segment was originally broadcast on Setanta Sports, and continued after the station was rebranded as Eir Sport in 2016.
