= The Athletic =

American subscription-based sports website

- Website type: Sports journalism
- Available in: English
- Headquarters: San Francisco, California, United States
- Owner: The New York Times Company
- Creators: Alex Mather; Adam Hansmann
- Website: nytimes.com/athletic
- Commercial: Yes
- Registration: Required
- Launched: January 2016; 10 years ago

The Athletic is an American subscription-based online newspaper operating as the sports journalism department of The New York Times. It provides national and local coverage in 47 North American cities as well as the United Kingdom. The Athletic also covers national stories from top professional and college sports. The Athletic's coverage focuses on a mix of long-form journalism, original reporting, and in-depth analysis.

The Athletic was launched by Alex Mather and Adam Hansmann in January 2016 as an independent subscription-based online sports magazine. Its business model was originally predicated on dis-aggregating the sports section of local newspapers, and reaching non-local fans not reached by a local newspaper. The magazine gradually expanded its stable of writers over the next few years to provide better coverage of more teams in more markets, including in the United Kingdom. However, it remained unable to earn enough revenue without advertising to make a profit, and the owners began to seek an outside buyer. The New York Times Company acquired The Athletic for $550 million in 2022, initially as a semi-independent entity under the continued direction of Mather and Hansmann. In July 2023, the company dissolved the New York Times' existing sports department, laid off or reassigned its sports staff, and began operating The Athletic as a replacement sports department under new management.

== Coverage ==
As of 2022, The Athletic provided local coverage in 47 cities and regions of North America as well as coverage in the United Kingdom. It includes the 32 National Football League teams, the 30 Major League Baseball teams, the 30 National Basketball Association teams, and 23 of the 32 National Hockey League teams.

== History ==
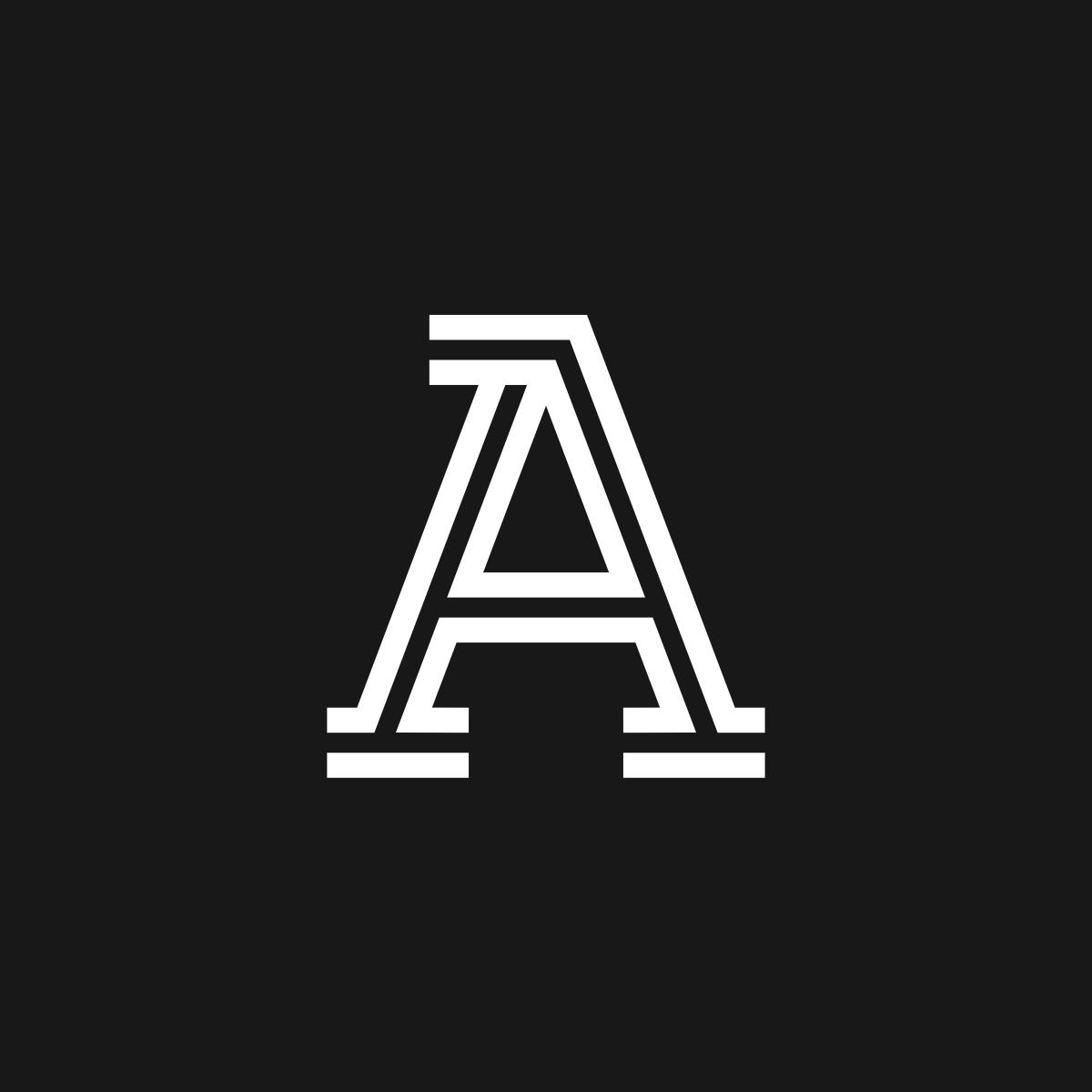
The Athletic app logo

The Athletic was founded by Alex Mather and Adam Hansmann, former coworkers at subscription-based fitness company Strava, with the mission of producing "smarter coverage for die-hard fans." The company was built as an alternative to the struggling ad-supported models. The Athletic relies on subscription revenue, not advertising revenue, to support the business. Mather and Hansmann believed sports fans would be willing to pay for good reporting and writing, a clean app and no ads. At the time, a few newspapers were trying out paywalls, but the common industry view was that information on the internet needed to be free.

As part of Y Combinator's summer 2016 batch, the site originally launched in Chicago in January 2016, with Jon Greenberg serving as the founding editor, along with Sahadev Sharma (Cubs) and Scott Powers (Blackhawks). Greenberg and Powers previously worked at ESPN Chicago, while Sharma left Baseball Prospectus' Cubs vertical to join the website.

=== Expansion ===
In October 2016, The Athletic expanded to a second city, Toronto, to focus on Maple Leafs, Raptors, and Blue Jays coverage. The Athletic hired James Mirtle as editor-in-chief for Toronto. Mirtle had spent over a decade as a sportswriter at The Globe and Mail before joining The Athletic. A third city, Cleveland, launched in March 2017, with Jason Lloyd as editor-in-chief. The Athletic continued city expansion to Detroit in June 2017 with the hiring of Craig Custance from ESPN as editor-in-chief.

In August 2017, the site launched in the San Francisco-area market with long-time San Jose Mercury News writers Tim Kawakami as editor-in-chief and Marcus Thompson as columnist. The Athletic also added national coverage with new writers including baseball veteran Ken Rosenthal, shortly after Fox Sports eliminated its entire writing staff, as well as college basketball standout Seth Davis and college football institution Stewart Mandel. Mandel led the launch of the national college football section, "The All-American", at the end of August. The Athletic expanded into Philadelphia, Minnesota, Pittsburgh, St. Louis, and the rest of Canada in September 2017 bringing local coverage to 15 US and Canadian pro sports markets. The vast majority of expansion was aimed at expanding coverage to underserved hockey fans.

In February 2018, The Athletic announced further expansion into three new cities—New York, Dallas, and Cincinnati—and launched baseball-only coverage in Houston, Los Angeles, San Diego, Arizona, and Kansas City. The site also introduced expanded national MLB coverage with the addition of Jayson Stark, Jim Bowden, Eno Sarris, and editor Emma Span. The site announced full coverage in Denver and Boston starting in April 2018. In Denver, The Athletic hired several reporters from The Denver Post. In Boston, the initial staff consisted of beat writers previously employed at The Boston Globe, the Boston Herald, and the Springfield Republican's web portal MassLive. Adding to college football coverage, The Athletic added dedicated beat writers for major programs like Alabama, Georgia, and Tennessee.

In May 2018, the site announced coverage of both domestic and international soccer. In June 2018, The Athletic increased coverage in Los Angeles and expanded into Buffalo, New York, by hiring several reporters who had been bought out from The Buffalo News the same month. The Athletic continued market expansion in July 2018 with the addition of Atlanta with former The Atlanta Journal-Constitution writers David O'Brien and Jeff Schultz, Baltimore, and Wisconsin. The site also added 19 college football writers to cover most of the major NCAA football programs.

In August 2018, The Athletic launched Fantasy Sports coverage and continued expansion across US markets including Washington, D.C., Carolina, Nashville, Indiana, Miami, and New Orleans. The site also announced expanded NBA reporting with Shams Charania and NFL coverage with Jay Glazer. The Athletic completed local coverage expansion to all NHL and NFL teams by September 2018 after adding writers in Jacksonville, Houston, Oklahoma, Oregon, and Las Vegas. Memphis was added as the 47th local market covered by The Athletic in October 2018, expanding coverage to all NBA teams. The Athletic signed three veteran TV journalists in November 2018, including 60 Minutes correspondent Armen Keteyian, in the publication's efforts to produce more video content as a supplement to written coverage.

In May 2019, The Athletic announced an expansion into motorsports coverage featuring veteran journalist Jeff Gluck. While NASCAR is the dominant focus of coverage, The Athletic aims to be a destination for all motorsports fans by including other major events, such as the Indianapolis 500.

In August 2019, The Athletic expanded to the United Kingdom, predominantly covering domestic and international football. The team was initially led by managing director Ed Malyon and editor-in-chief Alex Kay-Jelski. As part of this expansion, The Athletic acquired UK-based football YouTube channel Tifo Football in April 2020 and podcast production company Muddy Knees Media in June 2020, although Tifo Football has largely retained its own brand identity, and is now known as Tifo Football by The Athletic.

In April 2024, Laura Williamson was announced as the editor-in-chief for UK and Europe. Their stable of writers, includes: Michael Cox and Oliver Kay... David Ornstein and Daniel Taylor.

=== Sale to The New York Times Company ===
The company began exploring a sale to a larger media company in 2021, following continued unprofitability, driven by high expenses and reliance on venture capital funding instead of operational revenue. As of that time, the site had 1.2 million subscribers and $80 million in revenue, having raised $55 million in venture capital funding. Axios entered discussions with The Athletic in March of that year but ultimately declined to make an offer. The New York Times was the leading contender for a potential acquisition as of May, with Vox Media also expressing interest. Buyout talks between The Athletic and The New York Times ended in June 2021. On November 2, 2021, reports emerged that sports betting companies DraftKings and Flutter Entertainment were among the bidders for the company.

In January 2022, the New York Times Company announced that it would acquire The Athletic for $550 million, in a transaction expected to close in the first quarter of 2022. The Times noted that The Athletic's newsroom would continue to run independently of the Times, and co-founders Alex Mather and Adam Hansmann would stay on after the acquisition under David Perpich, who was appointed as publisher. In June 2023, The Athletic underwent a reorganization, cutting 4% of its staff, reassigning 20 journalists, and discontinuing the use of team-specific beat reporters. The following month, The New York Times announced that it would shut down its own sports department in favor of distributing content from The Athletic and its reporters via its platforms. Existing New York Times sports reporters were reassigned to other departments. The decision was criticized by the New York Times Guild, which alleged the paper was engaging in union busting by "outsourc[ing] union jobs on our sports desk to a non-union Times subsidiary under the preposterous argument that The Times can 'subcontract' its sports coverage to itself." The acquisition also caused journalists continuing in The Athletic to be subject to the Times' editorial policies. A series of interviews with full-time journalists at The Athletic found a growing dissatisfaction in their perceived autonomy as a result of the acquisition and subsequent policy changes.

In May 2024, The Athletic's website was migrated from theathletic.com to nytimes.com/athletic. The New York Times Company reported that The Athletic was profitable for the first time in its history in the third quarter of 2024. At the end of 2024, the company reported that 5.83 million subscribers had access to The Athletic, either directly or through a bundle subscription, the last time this metric was publicly reported. In the second quarter of 2025, The Athletic recorded revenue of $54.0 million and a profit of $5.8 million, its fourth consecutive profitable quarter. Starting with the third quarter of 2025, The New York Times Company no longer breaks out The Athletic's financial data in its quarterly reports.

== Funding ==
Investors, media executives, and reporters who don't work for the Athletic all express skepticism about the business. But almost no one will share these sentiments publicly. Who wants to be seen badmouthing one of the only places still hiring journalists? Bringing on writers for top dollar and freeing them from chasing clicks is admirable, the doubters say, but it's no way to make money.

— Ira Boudway, Bloomberg BusinessWeek

The Athletic has raised a total of $139.5 million over five rounds. The first major funding was provided by Courtside Ventures, which provided $2.3 million in seed funding in Jan 2017. In July 2017, the company raised another $5.4 million in Series A funding also led by Courtside Ventures. In March 2018, the company announced a $20 million third round of funding led by Evolution Media. Mather reported that this money would be invested into expanding coverage to new cities and increasing the number of writers from the then staff of 120. The Athletic raised another $40 million in a Series C funding round in October 2018, co-led by Founders Fund and Bedrock Capital. The money will be used to invest in expanding teams focused on audience, data and editorial teams, subscriptions, podcasts and video.

As of August 2019, The Athletic had 600,000 paying subscribers with an 80% retention rate year-over-year. Most of its subscribers, 60%, follow sports teams in two or more cities. In September 2020, The Athletic announced one million global subscribers, as well as expansion into additional breaking news content formats.

== Investigations ==
The Athletic has published multiple investigations regarding workplace misconduct, sexual abuse, and other transgressions in the sports community. In 2018, Athletic journalist Tim Cato published an in-depth report on allegations regarding workplace misconduct within the Dallas Mavericks organization. The report detailed how high-ranking members within the Mavericks organization ignored and tacitly approved of financial misconduct and mental abuse. In March 2021, The Athletic published an investigation regarding sexual misconduct and abuse at Louisiana State University (LSU). In the report, Brody Miller detailed the rampant sexual misconduct that was present at all levels of the LSU organization, and interviews with former players helped support an investigation conducted by law firm Husch Blackwell.

In September 2021, The Athletic released a report detailing the gross sexual misconduct of association football coach Paul Riley in the NWSL. The report detailed Riley's sexual abuse of several players, namely Sinead Farrelly and Meleana Shim, as well as an unnamed additional player, while coaching at Portland Thorns FC. The report also revealed that the allegations, first reported to the club in 2016, were partially responsible for the decision not to renew his contract in Portland. Riley, however, immediately assumed a new coaching position within the NWSL. The NWSL, and Riley's current team, responded with no comment. Paul Riley denied all allegations. Riley was subsequently dismissed, and the relevant soccer bodies (NWSL, FIFA and the United States Soccer Federation) launched investigations.

== Podcasts ==
The Athletic produces over 80 exclusive podcasts. The lineup features a mix of daily, weekly, and league-specific shows covering major sports. In August 2025, the brand signed a deal with Acast, with Acast serving as The Athletic's exclusive sales partner. That same month, podcast The Sports Gossip Show joined The Athletic's network.
