= Ed Malyon =

British sports journalist

- Education: University of Manchester
- Occupations: Businessman; Journalist
- Known for: Co-owner of Querétaro F.C.
- Height: 6 ft 5 in (1.96 m)

Ed Malyon is a British businessman who is co-owner of the Liga MX football club Querétaro F.C. Previously he was managing director of UK Operations for The Athletic. He was formerly the sports editor of The Independent and the weekend football editor of the Daily Mirror.

== Education ==
Malyon received a B.A. in Spanish and French from Manchester University.

== Career ==
Malyon began his journalism career as a freelance writer, reporting on South American football for The Daily Mirror, Sports Illustrated, ESPN, The Guardian and FourFourTwo. He joined the Daily Mirror full-time in 2013 and was later made deputy sports editor and European football correspondent.

Malyon was appointed sports editor of The Independent in 2017 while still only 27, the youngest in the history of Fleet Street to be given the role. He was the host of The Indy Football Podcast, nominated for ‘best podcast’ at the 2017 Football Supporters Federation awards.

He left the Independent on 17 May 2019 to join startup US sports website The Athletic, founding their London office and international business.

Malyon was described by the Daily Telegraph as “among the most powerful figures in British sports media”.

On 11 July 2025, Malyon and his investor group closed the acquisition of Querétaro F.C. to become the first majority-U.S. ownership group in Liga MX.

== Personal life ==
Malyon is a supporter of Crystal Palace FC. He resides in America with his family.
