= Second Captains =

Irish production company

- Industry: Media
- Founded: 2013
- Headquarters: Dublin, Ireland
- Key people: Eoin McDevitt, Mark Horgan, Ken Early, Ciarán Murphy, Simon Hick.
- Products: Podcasts, Radio, Television
- Website: www.secondcaptains.com

Second Captains is a production company founded by Ken Early, Simon Hick, Mark Horgan, Eoin McDevitt and Ciarán Murphy and based in Dublin, Ireland.

The Second Captains Podcast was launched in March 2013 and quickly became the most-popular pod in Ireland, winning the iTunes podcast of the year in 2014. Focusing mainly on sport but also touching on comedy, politics and popular culture, the show has since been chosen as one of The Guardian's 50 best podcasts and as one of the top ten British and Irish podcasts of all-time as part of iTunes Essentials list.

In 2017, the company expanded its online shows and launched The Second Captains World Service, a podcast feed available only to members. The independent, member-led, commercial-free platform is now one of the biggest podcasts in the world on Patreon.

Second Captains was the first major radio show to move from traditional programming to podcasting in Ireland and remains the most popular podcast ever produced in Ireland.

Second Captains also produce radio, podcasts and television for the BBC and RTÉ. Their radio show Second Captains Saturday has been a regular production on RTÉ Radio 1 since 2015.

The company has also produced five series of the IFTA-nominated Second Captains Live for RTÉ 2 television and the series Where Is George Gibney? for BBC Sounds.

== Podcast ==
The Second Captains Podcast began on 14 May 2013 in conjunction with The Irish Times. The show quickly became the most popular podcast in Ireland, winning the iTunes podcast of the year in 2014. In 2015, the podcast was chosen as one of the top ten British and Irish podcasts of all time as part of the iTunes Essentials list and it was selected as one of The Guardian's 50 best podcasts of 2016. It remains Ireland's most-listened-to podcast.

Second Captains expanded its online shows in February 2017 and launched The Second Captains World Service podcast feed available only to Second Captains' members and was no longer connected to The Irish Times. The Player's Chair Podcast hosted Richie Sadlier and Ken Early's Political Podcast were added to the roster of programming. Isolating with David O'Doherty was a popular Second Captains podcast during the COVID-19 pandemic. The commercial-free, subscriber-based podcast is one of the most popular in the world on Patreon.

Regular guests include Shane Horgan, Malachy Clerkin, Miguel Delaney, Jonathan Wilson, Richie Sadlier, Oisín McConville, Jamie Wall, Caitlin Thompson, Paul Flynn, Sineád O'Carroll and Brian Murphy from San Francisco's KNBR radio station, who speaks on US sports.

In March 2018, Second Captains celebrated their fifth birthday with interviews with Ken Loach, Vincent Browne, Lynne Cox, Michael Chieka and Paul Kimmage.

In 2023, the podcast celebrated a decade of broadcasting with a series of sold out live shows in the Olympia Theatre, National Stadium and Liberty Hall Theatre in Dublin. The podcast has also been broadcast regularly in the UK and the US.

== Television Show ==
In August 2013, three months after the podcasts began, Second Captains made a not-for-broadcast pilot for RTÉ television. Soon after, they were commissioned for a four-show run on RTÉ2 in September/October 2013. The first broadcast was scheduled on 10 September 2013, to coincide with a vital World Cup qualifying match in Vienna between Ireland and Austria, going on immediately after the live coverage of the game. Thereafter the show reverted to Wednesday nights. Second Captains Live was enthusiastically received by audiences, the Irish Independent calling it "sports broadcasting of the highest quality" and the Irish Times describing it as "ridiculously fabulous".

The series was nominated for an IFTA award in 2015.

The Good Wall was a feature on the television show where the top ten Irish sportspeople of all-time are chosen by Second Captains contributors. Each week, the program's major guests could make one change to the existing wall and introduce a new sportsperson to the top ten. Ronan O'Gara made a stir when he removed former teammate O'Driscoll from the top spot in show one.

== Where Is George Gibney? for BBC Sounds ==
In 2020, the company produced the groundbreaking investigative series Where Is George Gibney? for BBC Sounds. The series is about George Gibney, a famous Olympic coach charged with child sexual abuse but who, to that point, had never stood trial. Reporter and producer Mark Horgan travels across Ireland, the UK and the US on Gibney's trail. The documentary podcast was one of the most successful in the world in 2020, winning a Banff World Media award, a Prix Europa award, three golds at the New York Festival Awards, two Justice Media Awards, an ARIA Award, a Webby Award and a British Podcast Award.

A new BBC international podcast series for broadcast in Spring 2024 is currently in production.

== Second Captains on RTÉ Radio 1 ==
Second Captains Saturday interviews guests on how sport has impacted them, for good and bad. The show's main feature 'This Sporting Life' discusses the Greatest Non-Sportsperson Sportsperson. Second Captains Saturday has been a summer series on RTÉ Radio 1 since 2015 and, in 2023 had Conan O'Brien as a guest.

== The Name 'Second Captains' ==
The name Second Captains comes from a press conference exchange Ken Early once had with then-Ireland football manager Steve Staunton. Commenting on the return of experienced goalkeeper Shay Given to the starting team, Early asked Staunton if it was "almost like having a second captain on the team." Staunton paused for a moment and then said - "Pffft... second captain, first captain, whatever."

The five-man team previously produced and presented the Off The Ball show on Newstalk national radio station for nine years, and had received radio awards. They left their Newstalk jobs in early March 2013.
