= Miguel Delaney =

Football journalist and author in Ireland

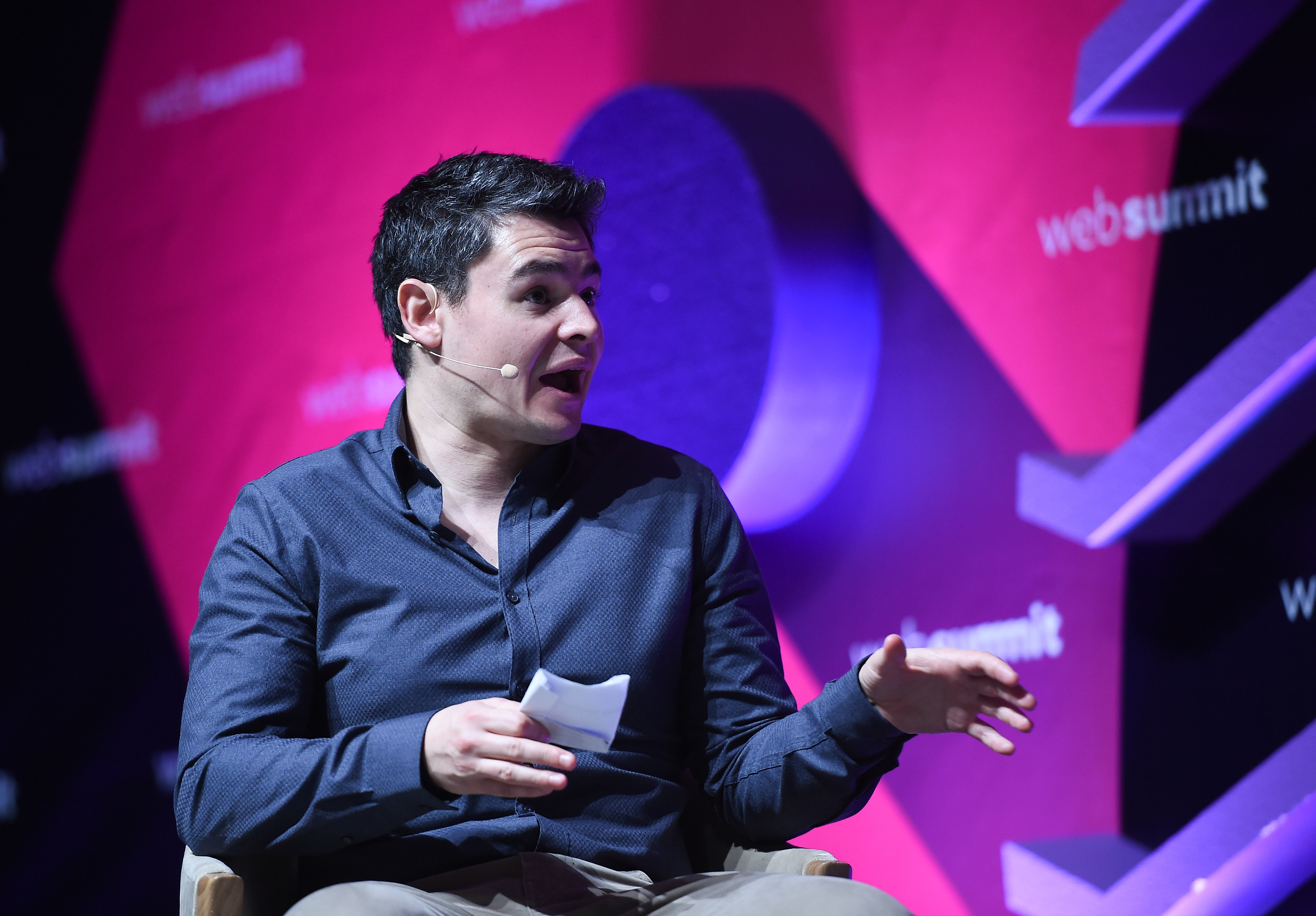
Delaney in 2017

Miguel Delaney is a Spanish-Irish football journalist and author. He is the chief football writer at The Independent.

== Career ==
Whilst working in his native country Ireland with the Sunday Tribune, Delaney was nominated for Young Journalist of the year at the National Media Awards, and was later nominated for the NNI Sports Journalist of the year award. After starting at The Tribune Delaney went on to write for ESPN, Ireland's Sunday Independent, the pages of The Blizzard, Eurosport, The Daily Mirror, and The Belfast Telegraph.

He is the author of the book Stuttgart to Saipan: The Players' Stories which covered Ireland's qualification for international tournaments in 1988, 1990, 1994 and 2002; the book made the long list for the William Hill Irish Sports Book of the Year and included interviews with the likes of Liam Brady, Pat Bonner and Mark Lawrenson.

Delaney has appeared as a pundit on the BBC Radio 5 Live 'Monday Night Club', The Anfield Wrap and Second Captains. Delaney can be heard most weeks during the football season contributing to The Indy Football Podcast. He has also guested on the Irishman Abroad podcast series.

Delaney appeared on the BBC Two television programme Premier League Show debating the greatest ever Premier League side with Gabby Logan, Chris Sutton, Ian Wright and Wes Brown. He has also appeared on BT Sport Football Writers show, and Sky Sports Sunday Supplement.

Delaney was in 2019 nominated for sports journalist of the year at the British Journalism Awards and football journalist of the year at the Football Supporters' Association awards. Miguel Delaney was shortlisted for the Writer of the Year at the Football Supporters' Association awards in 2020 and 2021.

Delaney's book States of Play was named Football Book of the Year at the British Sports Book Awards in May 2025. It was nominated for the 2025 William Hill Sports Book of the Year. In November 2025, Delaney was named the Football Supporters' Association Football Writer of the Year.

== Personal life ==
Delaney is half Irish and half Spanish and is bilingual. Delaney studied a journalism degree in Dublin at the DIT before completing a master's degree reading politics. Delaney described Hugh McIlvanney as his favourite sports writer.
