= The Indy Football Podcast =

Football podcast

The Indy Football Podcast was a weekly football podcast produced by The Independent.

Hosted by Vithushan Ehantharajah the podcast usually contains contributions by The Independent’s journalists Melissa Reddy, Miguel Delaney and Luke Brown. Episodes are usually weekly during the football season but were daily during the 2018 FIFA World Cup.

The Indy Football Podcast was nominated for Podcast of the Year at the 2017 Football Supporters Federation Awards. On the 31 October 2018 The Indy Football Podcast was announced as being nominated for the ‘podcast of the year award’ at the 2018 Football Supporters Federation Awards.
