= Holger Michael =

German diplomat (born 1954)

Holger Michael (born 1954) is a German diplomat. He was appointed as Ambassador to Bangladesh in 2009, and was succeeded by Albrecht Conze in October 2012.

He studied business administration in Cologne from 1972 to 1977 and attended the College of Europe 1977–1978. After a short stint as a trainee at the European Commission, he joined the West German foreign service in 1979, working at the Foreign Office in Bonn, the Embassy in Ankara (1982-1985), Managua (1985-1988, Deputy Head of Mission), Bonn (1988-1991), Seoul (1991-1994, Head of Economic/Commercial Department), Bonn (1994-1997, Deputy Head of Division), Hong Kong (1997-2002, Deputy Head of Mission), Bangkok (2002-2006, Deputy Head of Mission) and the Foreign Office in Berlin (2006-2009, Head of Division, Foreign Trade Promotion).
