= Ken Early =

Irish journalist and broadcaster

Kenneth Early (born 4 February 1979) is an Irish journalist and broadcaster. As of 2013, he was a director of Second Captains and a host of both Second Captains @ The Irish Times and the television show Second Captains Live on RTÉ 2. He is also a columnist with The Irish Times.

He was chief football correspondent for Newstalk and was a key member of the station's Off The Ball football show.

Early was present on the show from its inception until its cessation in March 2013 following a dispute with radio management.

The eldest of four children, Early was raised in Templeogue (by Greenhills Park) and graduated from Trinity College, Dublin in 2000. During his time at the university, he served as the editor of TCD Misc. Magazine, and was also a member of the University Philosophical Society. One of his earliest exposures to sport was as a member of the Templeogue Swimming Club.

In addition to co-presenting Off The Ball for Newstalk, he has also fronted the Arts show Culture Shock on the same radio station. He has also presented the early Saturday morning political programme Saturday Edition.
