= The End (Irish TV programme) =

- Genre: Comedy, Continuity
- Presented by: Seán Moncrieff; Barry Murphy
- Country of origin: Ireland
- Original language: English

Production
- Running time: 2–3 hours

Original release
- Network: Network 2
- Release: 1993 – 1995

The End was an Irish adult comedy late night television strand on Network 2 in the Republic of Ireland. The show served as both a continuity announcement and as a vehicle for comedy sketches and interviews. It was first broadcast in 1993, and was cancelled in 1995.

The End was aired on Friday and Saturday night from 11 pm to 2 am. RTÉ used this show to test the audience appetite for late night TV. The End was presented by Barry Murphy on Friday nights and by Seán Moncrieff on Saturday nights. The End had a cult following of "drunks and teenagers" who would often ring into the show leaving bizarre late night messages for the presenters. Sean Moncrieff would be joined by a puppet called Septic in later seasons.

Barry Murphy would use The End to launch many of his Apres Match characters such as Frank Stapleton.

== Format ==
Barry Murphy presented Friday Nights with a mix of his surreal comedy and introductions to the classic BBC comedy series The Fall and Rise of Reginald Perrin and the US sitcom 3rd Rock from the Sun.

Seán Moncrieff presented Saturday Nights with a mix of interviews and introductions to classic BBC comedy series Fawlty Towers and Yes Minister.

Colin Murnane appeared on both nights as a reporter.

== Legacy ==
The End would help to launch the careers of its two presenters. Following its cancellation, Seán Moncrieff presented the short-lived chat show Good Grief Moncrieff on RTÉ One. Later he would go on to present the RTÉ Two series Don't Feed the Gondolas, and he now hosts his own daytime radio show on Newstalk. Barry Murphy went on to create Après Match for RTÉ Sport alongside Risteárd Cooper and Gary Cooke, and the cult classic soap opera parody Soupy Norman.

The End's reporter Colin Murnane later moved to London to present for TCC, BBC, Sky1 and others, and has a career as a voice-over artist.

The Network 2 Night Shift strand would ultimately take over from The End. This was a more conventional continuity slot, only featuring a voice-over and lacking sketches and interviews. Each night would have a specific theme, Sci-Fi on Mondays with shows like Stargate: SG1, Crime on Tuesdays with shows like Millennium and Profiler etc. Night Shift would use the catchphrase "2 until 2" noting that Network 2 would be on the air until 2 am.
