= Later On 2 =

- Genre: The arts, chat show, current affairs
- Presented by: John Kelly, Clare McKeon, Fergus Finlay, Frank Dunlop, Olivia O'Leary
- Country of origin: Ireland
- Original language: English
- No. of seasons: 3

Production
- Production locations: RTÉ Studios, Donnybrook, Dublin, Ireland
- Running time: 40 minutes

Original release
- Network: Network 2 / RTÉ Two
- Release: September 1997 – May 2000

Related
- Nighthawks; The View; Later with O'Leary

Later On 2 is part of the Network 2/RTÉ Two N2 rebrand of 1997. It was broadcast after News 2 on Tuesday, Wednesday and Thursday night at 11:20pm.

== Format ==
=== Tuesday night ===
Later on 2 was an arts review show, which was presented by various presenters on a Tuesday night, until its second series when John Kelly took up the job. John Kelly worked on the Radio Ireland show Electric Ballroom before moving to RTÉ to present their radio series Mystery Train. In 2001, the show was renamed as The View and moved to RTÉ One in the same time slot.

=== Wednesday night ===
Later with Clare McKeon was presented by Clare McKeon for three seasons. It was a women's chat show. Women (and men) would sit around a dinner table talking about issues affecting them, in their work and home lives. Many of the women were well known female figures in Ireland, who spoke about their careers and personal lives. Including Annie Murphy mother of Bishop Eamonn Casey's son, Peter and Phyllis Hamilton mother of Fr Michael Cleary's son, Ross.

=== Thursday night ===
Later with Finlay and Dunlop was a current affairs show presented by Fergus Finlay and Frank Dunlop. This was a major coup for RTÉ, two well known political adversaries presenting a current affairs chat show. Finlay had previously been a key advisor to Tánaiste Dick Spring of Ireland's Labour Party, while Dunlop was the former Press Secretary of Fianna Fáil (a more conservative political party).

In 2000, after Frank Dunlop revealed that he had made payments to politicians at The Mahon Tribunal, Dunlop was dropped in favour of Jackie Gallagher. The decision was then made to rebrand the show with new presenter Olivia O'Leary. The show was renamed Later with O'Leary and, in 2001, moved to RTÉ One where it remained for 2 more seasons.

== Later on 2 moves to RTÉ One ==
In 2000 RTÉ moved the arts and politics shows to RTÉ One. Later on 2 with John Kelly remained on RTÉ One as The View on Tuesday nights, while in 2001 Later with O'Leary was axed from its Thursday night slot. Later with Clare McKeon was not moved to RTÉ One but was axed in 2000 with the move of The View and Later with O'Leary to RTÉ One.
