= Fergus Finlay =

Irish politician and writer

- Born: 1 June 1950 (age 76); Cork, Ireland
- Education: University College Cork
- Occupations: Presenter; columnist
- Known for: Adviser to former Tánaiste Dick Spring
- Political party: Labour Party

Fergus Finlay (born 1 June 1950) is the former Chief Executive of the charity Barnardos in Ireland, leaving the post in 2018. He was a senior member of the Irish Labour Party and is also a weekly columnist with the Irish Examiner and the author of a number of books.

Having worked in government press secretarial roles in the 1980s, Finlay served as an adviser to Dick Spring from 1983 to 1997. During this time, he was involved in campaigns that led to the election of Mary Robinson as president, a large increase in the number of Labour TDs following the 1992 general election, and the dropping of the constitutional ban on divorce in 1996.

He resigned from Labour in 1997, becoming a director of Wilson Hartnell Public Relations, heading the company's public affairs unit. In 1997, he also started presenting the Network 2 show Later On 2 with Frank Dunlop former Press Secretary of Fianna Fáil. In April 2010, the Sunday Business Post said he is "one of the great backroom operators of Irish political history, a strategist, tactician, and media briefer par excellence."

Finlay is also credited with helping to organise the visit of the Special Olympics to Ireland.

In 2009, Finlay was listed in 59th place on a list of "most influential people" in Irish society put together for Village magazine.

On 9 September 2010, Finlay announced that he would seek the Labour Party nomination to contest the 2011 Irish presidential election to elect the successor to Mary McAleese as President of Ireland. Michael D. Higgins eventually won that nomination. Finlay congratulated Higgins on his victory, saying he was "looking forward" to Higgins' Presidency.

Finlay was awarded an honorary degree by NUI Galway in 2019.
