= RTÉ2 =

Irish television station

- Logo used since 2014
- Country: Ireland
- Broadcast area: Ireland; Northern Ireland
- Headquarters: Donnybrook, Dublin

Programming
- Languages: English; Irish
- Picture format: 1080i HDTV; (SDTV feed shut down on 22 April 2024)
- Timeshift service: RTÉ2 +1

Ownership
- Owner: Raidió Teilifís Éireann
- Sister channels: RTÉ One; RTÉ KIDSjr; RTÉ News; RTÉ Kids

History
- Launched: 2 November 1978
- Former names: RTÉ 2 (1978–1988) (2014-present); Network 2 (1988–1997); N2 (1997–2004); RTÉ Two (2004–2014)

Links
- Website: www.rte.ie/player/onnow/66546216064

Availability

Terrestrial
- Saorview: Channel 2 (HD); Channel 12 (+1)
- Freeview (Northern Ireland only): Channel 55

Streaming media
- Virgin TV Anywhere: Watch live (Ireland only)
- RTÉ Player: Watch live (available depending on the laws and rights in applicable location)
- Sky Go: Watch live (Ireland only)

RTÉ2 (formerly known as Network 2, N2 and RTÉ Two) is an Irish free-to-air television channel owned and operated by Raidió Teilifís Éireann (RTÉ). It was launched on 2 November 1978 as Ireland's second television channel, at which point the pre-existing channel was renamed RTÉ 1 (currently RTÉ One).

The channel airs content aimed at 16-45 year-olds, including sport, imported shows and original productions.

== History ==
In the 1970s, the Irish government considered three options for the introduction of a second television service: the re-transmission of BBC1 Northern Ireland; authorisation of an independent commercial service; or charging RTÉ with the establishment of a second national channel. It was the last of these that was finally chosen.

On 24 August 1978, RTÉ 2 made its first test transmission with a musical. In the coming days, it aired other types of programmes, such as plays, documentaries and dramas, such as the BBC drama Spend, Spend, Spend. The programmes within a few days from the first test were grouped into themed seasons. The concept for RTÉ was to provide "a total television service between the two channels, with choice at all times".

After a period of test transmissions in the late summer and autumn the channel began scheduled broadcasting at 20:00 on 2 November 1978, opening with a broadcast of a gala ceremony from Cork Opera House. Owing to a technical error, audio from BBC2 was played during the countdown instead of the proper soundtrack. When the channel commenced programmes, there was no audio for the initial 15 seconds.

The opening night's line up was as follows:

- 20:00 – RTÉ 2 presenters Bernadette Ní Ghallchóir, Roisin Harkin and Raymond Maxwell introduce viewers to Ireland's second national television channel. The National Anthem followed.
- 20.05 – The President of Ireland, Patrick Hillery introduces the new service.
- 20.06 – First Night, a gala performance aired live from the Cork Opera House in Cork City, hosted by Mike Murphy. Guest stars included The Chieftains, Gemma Craven, Val Doonican, The George May Dancers, The Irish Ballet Company, The Montford Singers, John O'Connor, Maureen Potter, Colm C.T. Wilkinson and Lena Zavoroni. There were specially recorded inserts from British and American stars such as Bruce Forsyth, Ronnie Barker, Liberace, Sammy Davis Jr, Michael Parkinson, Andy Williams, Dana and Eamonn Andrews.l
- 21.30 – The first movie to be shown on RTÉ 2, Bullitt, starring Steve McQueen, Robert Vaughan and Jacqueline Bisset.
- 23.30 – Newsnight, a late night summary of the national and international news headlines.
- 23.35 – The channel closed down, ending the first night on air.

The channel started at 7:45 with fifteen minutes of the channel's clock counting down to launch; the inaugural speech preceded by the channel's first (and only) airing of the national anthem said that the channel would start at 6:50pm on weekdays, 3pm on Saturdays and 5pm on Sundays.

=== RTÉ 2 (1978–1988) ===
Up to 60% of the Republic of Ireland could receive UK channels via spillover or via cable. Cable in the republic was only permitted in areas of spillover up to the mid-1980s, to provide viewers with better reception of channels they could already receive over the air. Hence RTÉ 2 was aimed at those that did not have the UK channels. To this end one of their main remits was the re-broadcasting of UK programming to Irish audiences, that would not otherwise be seen on RTÉ 1.

The official opening on RTE 2 outlined the promised content of the new channel, with presenter Róisín Harkin stating: "from ten to seven [i.e. 6:50 p.m.] each weekday, three o'clock on Saturdays and six o'clock on Sundays, RTÉ 2 will be bringing you the best of BBC, ITV and other first rate programming." In the first two years of the channel, it would normally open at 6pm and close down for the night at 11.30pm.

British soap drama Coronation Street aired on the channel simultaneously with ITV's broadcasts of the programme (this continued until 1992 when it was put on RTÉ 1 due to the Olympic Games coverage). It broadcast much live programming from the BBC and ITV including Top of the Pops. However, the channel in its initial format was not considered a success. It was on air from 18:00 until 23:30 during the week, with an earlier start around 15:30 at weekends.

However, by 1987, RTÉ 2 rebranded as part of RTÉ's 25th celebrations relaunched with a new corporate logo and TV idents, this would be the first time that the RTÉ corporate logo would be seen on RTÉ2. While the rebrand was a small success for the channel it was felt that RTÉ 2 and RTÉ 1 needed more specific audiences. RTÉ 2 at this stage was becoming more and more associated with youth orientated programming and sports programming (especially as UK and other international channels were becoming more and more available across the country). In 1988, the majority of sporting and children's programming was moved to Network 2, the new name for RTÉ 2.

=== Network 2 (1988–1997) ===
In September 1988, RTÉ 2 was given a major revamp and became Network Two. In addition to the launch of a new vivid red, blue, and green logo, the channel now came on air at 14:30. The Den was moved to the channel, along with most youth and children's programming. Jo Maxi was launched as the youth strand. Sports Stadium took up the entire Saturday afternoon schedule, and all sports programming was aired on the channel, along with Irish language programming. A late night news bulletin, Network News, was followed by the controversial but highly successful chat show / soap opera Nighthawks presented by Shay Healy, and produced by David Blake-Knox.

This relaunch was a big success, and Network Two remained stable until the mid-1990s. A new logo – referring to the channel as RTÉ Network 2 (though the "RTÉ" part was not referred to by announcers) – was launched with the new RTÉ logo in 1995. By this time, RTÉ Network 2 broadcast from mid-morning onwards, with educational programmes during the day. Also during this era, the channel experimented with late night broadcasts at weekends, under The End brand, anchored by Barry Murphy and Sean Moncrieff. Broadcast hours were extended to 03:00 every day with a new service called The Night Shift.

=== N2 (1997–2004) ===
The N2 logo

There was another major revamp in November 1997, and the channel was visually rebranded as "N2", though announcers continued to refer to "Network 2". The goal of the rebrand was to reposition the channel towards a youth audience in order to increase its advertising revenue, as well as trying to counter the eventual launch of TV3. New features included a daily comedy slot at 8pm and themed weekends. N2 brought about perhaps as big a change as the original relaunch, RTÉ branding was dropped from the station almost completely, with home produced programmes now being referred to as "N2 Productions" (foreign imports were "N2 Presentations"). A futuristic logo along with a series of unusual graphical idents were developed. In-vision announcing returned. More importantly, the channel's line-up was completely refreshed. The late night schedule was completely revamped, with the launch of News 2—a tailored bulletin for young people—followed by a talk show, Later On 2. Monday nights became comedy nights, with the launch of home-produced comedy such as Don't Feed The Gondolas. Elsewhere theme nights became a regular fixture, particularly on Fridays and Saturdays. The Den was now broadcast all day until 18:00 and was renamed Den 2.

RTE 1 and N2 had separate Weather forecasts (November 1997- January 13, 2002). On Monday January 14, RTE 1 and N2 weather forecasts were remerged.

Not all the changes were universally welcomed, with the "N2" era, RTÉ cancelled its long-running Saturday sports programme, Sports Stadium in 1997.

Many of the innovations of the N2 era had faded out by 2003: Simpler creations replaced the idents and the in-vision continuity was scrapped again. Later On 2 had more-or-less ended (one of the strands later continued as The View on RTÉ One). In September 2003, News 2 reverted to the regular RTÉ News format (as RTÉ News on Two).

From September 2003, continuity announcers and trailers began to refer to the channel by the fuller title of "RTÉ Network Two", in line with a new RTÉ initiative to promote the corporate branding. The main channel idents never changed and said merely "N2" (although a newly introduced on-screen DOG said "RTÉ N2".) and finally in 2004 Network 2 was relaunched as RTÉ Two, in line with its sister channel RTÉ One.

=== RTÉ Two (2004–2014) ===
RTÉ decided the channel needed another revamp to keep it fresh. The channel's name reverted to RTÉ Two on the morning of 2 October 2004, with a themed evening of programmes called "Farewell Network 2" beginning at 20:00, featuring Podge and Rodge. The new logo is similar in style to the current RTÉ One logo. The new branding is designed to promote the Irishness of the station, green is the dominant colour. New strands were developed. In particular, the number of Irish made programmes has increased, though some of this is made up of a new strand of early evening repeats. The idents from this time were based on a Green Room theme.

The latest change has been a complete rebrand and relaunch of The Den, on Saturday 17 September 2005, with the id Two strand becoming TTV on the following Monday. In September 2009, TTV relaunched as Two Tube.

RTÉ Two got a new look on 17 September 2009. The new idents were created by RTÉ Graphic Design. Programme cutbacks saw the end of 24-hour broadcasting on the channel, with Euronews filling the down-time. Teleshopping was also introduced for the first time.

Continuing with the corporate branding of RTÉ radio and Television stations RTÉ Two's iconic children's brand The Den ended on 20 September 2010. The Den was replaced by TRTÉ, while Den Tots was replaced by RTÉjr; this was due mainly to the onset of digital TV on which RTÉjr is available as a separate channel. Two Tube remains as the teenage block of programming.

=== RTÉ2 (2014–2017) ===
From 22 September 2014 RTÉ Two became RTÉ2 and presented a new schedule of programming. The channel established itself as the "voice for the under 35s" where the new schedule continued with new seasons of New Girl, The Big Bang Theory, Grey's Anatomy, Brooklyn Nine-Nine, Masters of Sex, Devious Maids, The Americans, Agents of S.H.I.E.L.D. and the final season run of Mad Men. Brand new imported shows included Outlander, Gotham, Resurrection, iZombie and CSI Cyber. RTÉ2 confirmed it had secured broadcasting rights for two Danish drama series 1864 and The Saboteurs: The Heavy Water War, both broadcasting in 2015. In terms of home-produced Irish programming RTÉ2 confirmed the return of Other Voices (Season 13), Maia Dunphy's What Women Want (Season 2), Second Captains Live, The Savage Eye (final series), The Republic of Telly, Damo & Ivor, The Fear and the newly created youth orientated news service News Feed. RTÉ2 also confirmed new Irish reality programmes including Holding Out for a Hero, Connected, Full Frontal, Bressie's Teenage Kicks, and Drunk and #Trending.

RTÉ2 continued to focus on major sporting events and the channel will showcase Irish films in association with the Irish Film Board. TRTÉ will play a major role in the daytime schedule on the channel. Two Tube will continue to air from 17:30 until 19:00. It is proposed by RTÉ to launch RTÉ2+1 in efforts to raise much needed revenue.

By 2015, RTÉ2 began to focus on imported programming from Denmark, Iceland and Germany. The channel increased its output of Irish themed reality series.

=== RTÉ2 (since 2018) ===
On 3 November 2018, RTÉ2 celebrated its 40th anniversary and began to offer vintage clips of shows from RTÉ2 on the RTÉ archives website.

Much of the innovation and local programming on RTÉ2 has been cut by RTÉ. Outside of sports programming RTÉ2 programming includes the Irish version of First Dates and a DIY show called Home Rescue. Some innovations remain such as Other Voices and highlights from the RTÉ Choice Music Prize.

With children's content now starting at 08:15 in the morning with RTÉjr, following a simulcast of Euronews, and finishing at 4:30.

=== RTÉ2 HD ===
RTÉ2 HD logo since 2014

The HD channel launched on Saorview on 27 May 2011. The service broadcasts sports, documentaries, movies and American, Canadian, and Australian programming in a high-definition 1080i format.

On 15 March 2012, RTÉ2 HD was added to UPC Ireland.

RTÉ2 HD was added to Sky on 16 May 2012. RTÉ2 HD was due to launch on Sky on 14 May 2012, but was delayed by two days due to technical problems. On 22 April 2024, RTÉ2 SD was shut down on Sky, marking the end of the standard-definition feed.

==== Format ====
- The channel simulcasts content from RTÉ2 SD and upscales SD content into HD. All other content on the channel is made available entirely in HD, this includes Gaelic Athletic Association, Champions League, World Cup, Olympic Games, Pro14 sporting content, USA television series and movies.

=== RTÉ2 +1 ===
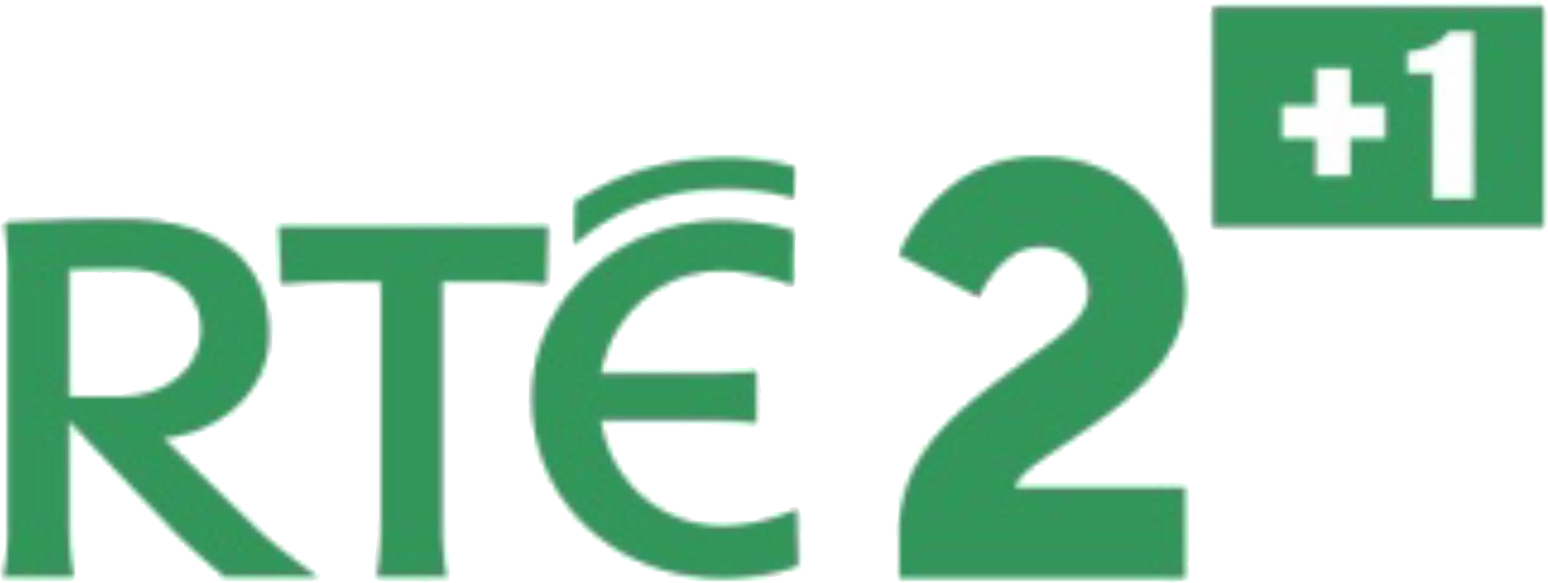
RTÉ2 +1 logo since 2019

RTÉ2 +1 launched on 19 February 2019, and it broadcasts daily from 19:00 until 02:00 on Mondays to Fridays and 12:00 until 02:00 on Saturdays and Sundays. The channel launched only on Saorview and it will eventually roll out onto other platforms such as Sky Ireland and Virgin Media Ireland.

The development of RTÉ2 +1 has been a long process however in May 2018, it was reported by The Irish Times that RTÉ have requested permission from the Department of Communications to launch RTÉ2 +1.

==== Astra 2F (Sky) ====
On 13 December 2018, RTÉ2 +1 began test broadcasts on Astra 2F under the label 5493 using frequency 11914 H 27500 5/6 DVB-S QPSK. Testing included showing Sky Sports channels and a previously aired weather forecast on repeat. This frequency is the same used by RTÉ One SD, RTÉ One +1, RTÉ2 SD and others. Astra 2F is a satellite that Sky and Freesat (in the UK) use.

On 19 February 2019, RTÉ2 +1 launched on Saorsat and Saorview. From 19 February to 20 July 2019, RTÉ2 +1 broadcast the same on Astra 2F as on Saorsat and Saorview. On 20 July 2019, RTÉ2 +1 stopped broadcasting on Astra 2F showing a "No signal" message.

On 24 February 2021, RTÉ2 +1 reappeared on Astra 2F on the same frequency as before using the same label (5493).

On Wednesday 10 March 2021, RTÉ2 +1 was added to Sky on channel 202.

== Budget ==
The following figures were issued by RTÉ as part of their annual reports in 2008 and 2012:

Income
Income type	2008	2012
Licence fee	€49,126,000	€53,456,000
Commercial income	€48,791,000	€30,007,000
Total income	€97,917,000	€83,463,000

Total costs

Cost type	2008	2012
Network and other related costs	€17,776,000	€14,193,000
Sales costs	€2,271,000	not given
Acquired programming	€11,172,000	€11,116,000
Irish productions	€88,673,000	€66,004,000
Total costs	€119,892,000	€91,313,000

Profit and loss

2008	2012
(€21,975,000)	(€7,850,000)

Breakdown of Irish productions

Production house	2008	2012
RTÉ	€70,226,000	€56,626,000
Independent producers	€18,447,000	€9,378,000
Total	€88,673,000	€66,004,000

The table below outlines RTÉ2's total in-house and commissioned programming by genre in 2008 and 2012:

Genre	2008	2012
Factual	€2,082,000	€2,332,000
Drama	€4,739,000	€102,000
Entertainment	€8,698,000	€7,033,000
Music	€1,000,000	€1,375,000
News, current affairs and weather	€3,024,000	€2,294,000
Sport	€53,820,000	€46,461,000
Young people's programming	€14,935,000	€7,527,000
Total	€88,673,000	€66,004,000

== Programming ==
RTÉ2 provides a broad range of programming which is mainly targeted towards young people up to 45-year-olds. Between 08:00 to 16:30 kids and teens programming is served by RTÉjr (separate to the channel) and the teenage strands TRTÉ and Two Tube. From 19:00 onwards, RTÉ2 provides a wide range of programming from Irish produced content, sports, comedy, dramas, films and acquisitions from North America, Australia, the UK and Central Europe. RTÉ2 has a strong tradition of broadcasting many US TV shows prior to other European broadcasters, though this has slightly changed in recent years.

Films are also regularly aired on the channel especially Irish-European cinema and International cinema. Until September 2014, RTÉ2 had stands such as Two Wild (nature documentaries), Two Extreme (extreme sports/adventure documentaries), and RTÉ Sport on Two, these strands were axed in 2014 but the strands contents play an important role in the current schedule.

=== RTÉ 2 Controller ===
Dick Hill was RTÉ 2's first controller until 1994.

During the time of the 1997 rebrand of the channel as N2 they had placed the Head of Schedule as "controller" of the channel. Up until then, the channel was run side by side RTÉ One under RTÉ Television. In October 1988 RTÉ 2 was repositioned as Network 2, with a full relaunch of the channel as 'N2' in November 1997.

Andrew Fitzpatrick was poached to take control of RTÉ scheduling from TV3; however, N2 basically reverted to being part of the overall RTÉ Television structure.

With no dedicated channel controller until then, in May 2011 it was announced by RTÉ that Eddie Doyle had been given the position of commissioning editor at RTÉ Two. Eddie Doyle was RTÉ Commission Editor of Entertainment.

In May 2013 RTÉ announced Bill Malone as RTÉ Two's controller. Eddie Doyle became Head of Comedy, Talent Development and Music at RTÉ.

In July 2016 Bill Malone moved to rival channel TV3 (now Virgin Media Television) as Head of Programming. Channel Control at RTÉ One, Adrian Lynch, took over the role at RTÉ2 and eventual became Director of Channels and Marketing at the broadcaster in 2018.

=== Imported programming ===
==== 1978–1988 ====
RTÉ 2 was original set up to provide Irish viewers with retransmission of BBC and ITV programming. In 1978 it introduced a simulcast of many British programmes including Top of the Pops. Other UK shows included Coronation Street (which began simulcasting from 1983), Porridge, Mastermind, Never the Twain, Treasure Hunt and Wogan and American shows such as The Dick Cavett Show, Tales of the Unexpected, My Friend Rabbit, Crazy Like a Fox and The Tracey Ullman Show. They also broadcast the Australian soap opera A Country Practice. In 1988 RTÉ did a major revamp of the service, focusing more on Sports, Children's TV, Irish Programming as RTÉ 2 was still behind both UTV and BBC One NI in the ratings.

==== 1988–1993 ====
As Network 2 the service still focused strongly on imported programming, RTÉ would now look to have first runs of US programming before other European networks. In the early years Network 2 broadcast US sit-coms Monday to Friday at 21:00 such as The Golden Girls, Cheers, The Days and Nights of Molly Dodd, Check It Out and Murphy Brown. They also broadcast Knots Landing and Falcon Crest. They also began broadcasting the long running Australian soap opera Home and Away, while A Country Practice moved to RTÉ One. In 1992 Coronation Street moved to RTÉ One. Other US shows at this time included Head of the Class, Ferris Bueller and Eerie Indiana.

==== 1993–1997 ====
During the 1990s Network 2 began to expand it schedule to cover morning and late night television. Imports still played a major part of the schedule with first showings of popular 1990s TV such as Friends, The X-Files, Nowhere Man, My So-Called Life, but also Late Night and Daytime repeats of Yes Minister, The Fall and Rise of Reginald Perrin, Cheers, The Beverly Hillbillies, Peyton Place, The Mary Tyler Moore Show, MacGyver and also the morning strand of Open University. At 18:00 they began showing many US teen sitcoms such as California Dreams, Saved by the Bell and Harry and the Hendersons, and The Fashion Show.

==== 1997–2004 ====
During the late 1990s the schedules began to increase in size again. All of the daytime repeat programmes were replaced by Children's television while Late Night TV was extended until 2 am each morning with shows like, Profiler, Millennium, Star Trek: Voyager (only airing the first season), Stargate SG-1 and some Australian serials including Water Rats and Murder Call. In 2001 they began broadcasting the Australian soap Neighbours. Popular prime time US programmes included Friends, The Parkers, Ally McBeal, 24, Dawson's Creek, Smallville, Jessie, Frasier and Boston Public. In 2000 Network 2 broadcast all episodes of the cult favourite Freaks and Geeks and finished the series before NBC did in the US. During this time they also began airing The Simpsons (also airing on Sky1) which had not been seen on the channel since The Tracey Ullman Show in the late 1980s.

==== 2004–2013 ====
Renamed in 2004 as RTÉ Two, the channel still had a heavy emphasis on imported programming. Its late night schedule contained imports including Rules of Engagement, 24, Rescue Me and Smallville. During this time, the channel also shown Cougar Town, Flash Forward, Lost, The Good Wife, CSI, Criminal Minds, Desperate Housewives, Grey's Anatomy, Sons of Anarchy, Life with Boys and Mr. Young.

RTÉ2 also airs American programmes such as The Simpsons, 90210, Revenge, Law & Order, Criminal Minds, The Big Bang Theory, Young Sheldon, Grey's Anatomy, Worst Week and Private Practice. Australian soaps Neighbours and Home and Away air along with Irish programmes such as Katherine Lynch's Wonderwomen, The Podge and Rodge Show. Other well known US shows on RTÉ2 include Lost, Ugly Betty, Prison Break, CSI: Crime Scene Investigation, CSI: Miami, CSI: NY, Desperate Housewives, The Americans, New Girl and 2 Broke Girls. It also airs Smallville, Sons of Anarchy, Eli Stone, Mr. Sunshine after midnight on weekends, and British shows such as Shameless and The Thick of It.

It has also aired Seasons 5, 6, 7, 8 and 9 of NCIS and also Season 2 of Hawaii Five-0. It is currently showing NCIS Season 10 on Saturdays at midnight and Hawaii Five-0 Season 3 on Sunday nights. The Walking Dead, Under The Dome and Person of Interest are other US shows added to the channel's schedule.

It continued to air the critically acclaimed music series Other Voices for an eleventh season.

==== 2014–2016 ====
In 2014, RTÉ Two began to focus more on Irish music programming for the first time in its history the annual Choice Music Prize was aired on television, previously only available on radio. In August 2014, RTÉ Two televised over 8 hours of Electric Picnic coverage from Stradbally, County Laois, this was the first time that the channel aired the annual music festival. On 2 September 2014, RTÉ began to air new comedy series Mom as part of their Autumn schedule. Additional shows to begin airing in 2014 include Gotham. A new fashion and entertainment series produced in-house by RTÉ called #Trending will be hosted by Darren Kennedy.

Vikings premiered on the channel in early January 2014, and series 2 aired from October 2014. In 2015, RTÉ2 returned to broadcasting non-English speaking content; these included Nordic dramas The Saboteurs and 1864. American series American Odyssey and Selfie were also added to the summer 2015 line-up. New shows included CSI Cyber. Season 3 of The Americans was added to the summer schedule also. Other non-English speaking programming were added to the RTÉ2 schedule in late 2015, including the critically acclaimed German drama Deutschland 83.

==== 2016–present ====
The summer 2016 schedule was largely made up of sports programming such as GAA, Euro 2016 and Summer Olympics 2016.

In early 2016, the broadcaster confirmed it would air the mini-series The X-Files, which began airing on 26 January. iZombie was another addition to their schedule, along with Icelandic crime drama Trapped. In Spring 2016, the channel debuted First Dates Ireland to positive reception.

== Irish-produced programming ==
=== Reality television ===
The 2000s like many other broadcasters RTÉ2 have had several reality based TV shows.

In 2003, Network 2 set out to find their news TV presenter in a reality show called The Selection Box; the eventual winner was Caroline Morahan.

RTÉ2 also produced two series of the employment reality show No Experience Required, three prospective candidates are evaluated over the course of a week for a vacant position in a top company, the show follows them through interview stages and tasks set out by their prospective employees.

In 2008, RTÉ Two broadcast Hollywood Trials. It follow a group of young actors travelling to make it big in LA. The actors where selected by Hollywood acting guru Margie Haber. Those selected to travel with Margie to LA included Chris Newman from the RTÉ Two drama Love is the Drug, George McMahon from RTÉ One soap opera Fair City and Michael Graham of Boyzone fame.

Hollywood Trials was then followed by The Model Agent. The model agent in question was Fiona Ellis and with help of Erin O'Connor as the girls mentor she picked Carrie-Anne Burton for a contract with Independent Models, one of the world's leading modelling agencies and a cover for Image magazine, one of the Ireland's most high profile and respected fashion titles.

Do the Right Thing, another reality series, began in September 2010 and was presented by Lucy Kennedy and Baz Ashmawy, in search of Ireland's ultimate volunteer and to win a year-long volunteering trip abroad.

In 2011 Masterchef Ireland began airing on the channel.

RTÉ2 also ran spin-off serials to RTÉ One's reality shows, such as You're a Star Uncut, Cabin Fever, and Treasure Island Uncovered.

First Dates Ireland began broadcasting in 2016.

=== Drama ===
In the first two decades of RTÉ2, little original drama was produced for the channel; often RTÉ would just repeat their dramas on the channel such as Fair City and Glenroe. RTÉ did place some emphasis on short film in the RTÉ series Short Cuts. Short films remain on RTÉ2 most Monday nights at 11:30; these shorts are not just taken from RTÉ co-financed productions but also from independent producers around the world.

RTÉ2's most successful drama was a drama/comedy/chat show entitled Nighthawks presented by Shay Healy. This was produced as a pseudo-documentary about the behind the scenes of the television production, it featured many well known Irish comedians, however unlike the mockumentary The Larry Sanders Show, Nighthawks featured real interviews and was created by David Blake Knox, who went on to be controller of Network 2 until 1998. Gerry Ryan had a similar format show called Gerry Ryan Tonight during the 1990s.

==== 2000–2008 ====
From 2000 to 2008, RTÉ were committed to providing new and original drama on RTÉ2 each Monday night each autumn. The dramas had mixed reviews but they included Paths to Freedom (2000), Bachelors Walk (2001–2003), The Big Bow Wow (2003), Pure Mule (2004), Love is the Drug (2004) and Prosperity (2007). Raw was RTÉ2's last Monday night drama; it received mixed reviews but it reached on average 250,000 viewers each week against RTÉ One's Prime Time Investigates and TV3's The Apprentice; Raw's second series ran on RTÉ One. Most of RTÉ2's drama output was aimed at a younger audience than that of RTÉ One's and it often contained bad language and sex scenes.

RTÉ ended their RTÉ2 drama's in 2008 with the first series of Raw, choosing to air its second series on RTÉ One. RTÉ are not currently looking for drama specifically for RTÉ2 which brings to an end a significant amount of work brought to the channel from RTÉ's drama department and independent producers. Many of the dramas of this era on RTÉ were seen as experimental but also highly modern and innovative.

=== Comedy ===
Monday night was comedy night on RTÉ2 from 1997 to 2006. Many US sitcoms were intermixed with live Irish comedy such as Don't Feed The Gondolas (DFTG), The Panel, The Podge and Rodge Show, A Scare at Bedtime with Podge and Rodge, @LastTV, The Liffey Laughs, The Blizzard of Odd, The Byrne Ultimatum and Night Live.

=== RTÉ Young Peoples ===
RTÉ Young People's department oversees programming for under-5s, 5- to 12-year-olds and teenage audiences. As part of RTÉ2's redevelopment in 1988 as Network 2, most of RTÉ's young people's programming moved from RTÉ One to Network 2.

==== Children's television ====
Dempsey's Den was hosted by Ian, Zig and Zag and Zuppy. It moved to Network 2 from RTÉ One, and broadcasting for an extra hour from 15:00 to 18:00. Network 2 would start the day 14:30 with Bosco a pre-school television show. All children's television moved to Network 2 when it rebranded in 1988. When Ian Dempsey left Dempsey's Den the show was renamed The Den, with a new presenter, Ray D'Arcy. D'Arcy presented the show from 1990 to 1997 when the strand began to expand it schedule into the early hours of the morning. From 1997 to 2010 The Den ran for 10 hours a day starting at 07:00 to 17:00 followed by a strand which was given various titles and targeted at a teenage audience. When RTÉ rebranded their children's strands in 2010, this effectively axed the country's longest-running children's TV show.

Saturday programming came from RTÉ Cork from the mid-1990s to the late-2000s, starting with The Swamp which took the place of classic Irish children's TV such as Pajo's Junkbox, Scratch Saturday and Anything Goes (which broadcast on RTÉ One). Satitude was RTÉ Cork's main TV show for children and was broadcast on The Den on RTÉ2 on Saturday mornings. Satitude was cancelled in 2009.

Den Tots was The Den's pre-school strand. It has been replaced by RTÉjr; RTÉ do not advertise during these selected hours.

==== Teenage television ====
Shows for young people in the 1970s and 1980s included:

- MT USA, a pop video music programming presented from New York by pioneering Irish radio DJ and television presenter Vincent Hanley
- Youthline, a series which looked at new and upcoming artists such as U2

In the late 1980s, RTÉ began simulcasting The Beatbox with 2FM as a replacement for MT USA. Presenters included Barry Lang, Electric Eddie (Doug Murray), Simon Young, Peter Collins, Ian Dempsey. It was replaced in 1995 with Dave Fanning's 2TV. 2TV spawned several spin offs: late night videos hosted by Jon Slattery, and RTÉ's only attempt at a morning show in 1999 with Bianka Luykx.

In 1988, Jo Maxi appeared for the first time until 1993, a daily teen show airing at 18:00, which was later replaced by Echo Island and in the early 2000s by ID, followed by ID2, TTV and Two Tube. Within the programming block, contained such shows as The Big Bang Theory, Neighbours (repeated from RTÉ One), The Simpsons and Home and Away. This block of programming finished in 2016.

Space Station Video's – Late 1985/1986 – music video show presented by people from the world of music, sport & entertainment, including Chris de Burgh & Phil Lynnot – Set on a space station – time on – unknown.

=== News and current affairs ===
Since January 2017 RTÉ2 provides no regular prime time news or current affairs programme. Children's news programme News2day remains part of their line up, however this programme only airs until the end of May, with it finishing up in Mid-March in 2020 due to the COVID-19 pandemic.

From 1978 to 2014, RTÉ2 provided late night news. The first such news programme was called NewsNight. The programme was a wide international news service which provided news stories from US and UK broadcasters the show also included a national news bulletin, the final late night news on the channel was called RTÉ News on Two.

As part of the relaunch of RTÉ Two as Network 2 in 1988 the news was renamed Network News. The news was now similar in style to the newly launched Six One news and Nine News on RTÉ One.

In 1997, with the possibility of competition from a new local broadcaster Network 2 relaunch again known on screen as N2. Late night news was renamed News2 and was hosted by Sharon Ní Bheoláin and Anthony Murnane and aimed at a much younger audience. Its content was customised for a younger audience, and presenters and journalists tend to use more informal language on the programme.

In 2004 following another relaunch back to the name of back to RTÉ TWO, the programme was renamed RTÉ News on Two. It was the final RTÉ late evening news programme to air on the channel. The program was broadcast Monday-Thursday. It did not have a regular time slot, but was usually broadcast at some point between 22:45 and 23:30. In October 2006 Eileen Whelan became the main presenter for the programme, following the departure of Anthony Murnane who was with the programme since 1997. John O'Driscoll was the programme Editor. When RTÉ launched their mid-breakfast programme, Morning Edition, on RTÉ One RTÉ News on Two was reduced to a 10-minute bulletin, until its demise in 2014.

In March 2007 until September 2014 it was available as streamed live on the RTÉ website. On Fridays an extended late summary on RTÉ One was broadcast instead of RTÉ News on Two.

On 22 September 2014 it was dropped in favour of two bulletins at 18:55 and 19:55 called News Feed, it was cancelled in January 2017.

RTÉ2 no longer cover current affairs. Current affairs programming on the channel included Market Place a business news show and Later on 2. On Budget Day, RTÉ broadcast Opposition speeches on RTÉ2, while both RTÉ One and RTÉ News Now covered analysis of the budget. In 2018 due to an Irish Soccer match on the same night the Budget speeches moved to the RTÉ News channel, where they have since remained.

=== Sport ===
In 2019 it was announced that RTÉ planned to move all major sporting events to RTÉ One.

RTÉ2 broadcasts the majority of RTÉ's sports content. Since RTÉ own rights to several competitions any fixtures clashing with RTÉ2's schedule will often be provided on RTÉ One, however RTÉ One rarely provides sporting events on weekdays hence most soccer matches are shown on RTÉ2. These include UEFA Champions league and the League of Ireland and competitive Ireland National Football Team matches. George Hamilton is the station's main sports commentator. RTÉ2 also covers some smaller sports such as athletics, cycling, extreme sports, golf, field hockey, racquet sports, scuba diving, target shooting, triathlon, and water sports. RTÉ2 also covers the Olympic Games.

RTÉ used to cover basketball which has moved to TG4, combat sports, snooker, pool and used to cover the annual International Rules Series between Ireland and Australia; however, this has moved to TG4. RTÉ also used to cover Wimbledon and the Tour de France which is now on TG4.

RTÉ main sporting rights are UEFA Champions League Live & Highlights, Ireland International qualifying matches Live & Highlights, League of Ireland Live & Highlights, FIFA World Cup Live & Highlights, European Championship Live & Highlights, FAI Cup Live & Highlights, Women's FAI Cup Live & Highlights, 6 Nations Championship Live & Highlights, Ireland Autumn Internationals Live & Highlights, Women's 6 Nations Live & Highlights, Olympic Games, GAA Championship Live & Highlights, GAA League Highlights, Grand National, The Derby, Galway Races, Punchentown and the Cheltenham Festival which take commentary and coverage from Channel 4 with RTÉ's own presenter and analysis.

RTÉ2's sports coverage is its most popular programming strand, it often tops RTÉ2's most watch shows, significantly out doing other all other programming. RTÉ plan to provide most sporting events in High Definition on RTÉ2.

==== GAA ====
RTÉ2 provides most of the GAA championship coverage for hurling and football, in 2008, RTÉ lost its monopoly on the championship games to TV3 for the first time in its 10-year history took an interest in the games having mainly bought in soccer and bought live rights for 10 of the matches for three seasons, this forced the Sunday Game Live off air some weekends with live coverage only on TV3 however TV3 lost these rights to Sky Sports for Summer 2014 therefore Sky have 14 live exclusive matches and share semi-finals and finals of the All Ireland Series with RTÉ, RTÉ continue to show the Sunday Game at 9:30 pm on RTÉ2 throughout these month.

The main GAA show is called The Sunday Game it is a review of the weekend's action and it is presented by Michael Lyster and Des Cahill, The Sunday Game Live is broadcast earlier in the day. While The Saturday Game Live only provides live coverage of the games. Setanta Sports also holds rights for the GAA Championships however these are delayed rights as Setanta Sports is a pay television service. RTÉ2 also provides live coverage of the Camogie All-Ireland finals. RTÉ was one of three sponsors for the Hurling Championships.

==== Soccer ====
League of Ireland rights are owned by RTÉ and Eir Sport. They each take turns on showing live matches each Friday night. RTÉ also show FAI Cup games and the final in HD. Every Monday at 7 pm, RTÉ produce a domestic soccer show called Monday Night Soccer (MNS) presented by Peter Collins which provides a roundup of the weekend of League of Ireland and international team news with regular guests, this was axed in 2014 and replaced by Soccer Republic which airs around 11 pm every Monday night. RTÉ have held rights to the 15:00 Premier League match from the English league between 2004 and 2007, this was hosted by Bill O'Herlihy, Darragh Maloney, Michael Lyster and Des Cahill with commentary by George Hamilton, Peter Collins and Darragh Maloney, however these are now owned by Setanta Sports. In June 2013, RTÉ decided not to renew their highlights package for the Premier League as part of cost-cutting measures and to concentrate on national sporting interests and live sporting rights. This package has been since taken up by eir Sport. The currently have the rights to the 2016 UEFA European championship and 2018 FIFA World Cup. They currently hold the rights to Wednesday nights soccer from the UEFA Champions League with both Setanta and TV3 all other hold rights and signed a new deal in December 2014 to continue broadcasting Champions League to 2018. They also broadcast games of the Republic of Ireland national football team competitive matches in qualifying for European Championships and World Cups and matches in these tournaments should they qualify, though the games were formerly broadcast by RTÉ One. After successfully broadcasting the men's tournament a year ago, in 2019 RTÉ also aired the FIFA Women's World Cup with TG4. RTÉ broadcasts 23 of 52 matches in English and TG4 with 29 of 52 matches in Irish respectively. The presenter for big matches such as the Champions League and Ireland matches is Darragh Maloney who is usually joined by Eamonn Dunphy, John Giles and Liam Brady while commentary comes from George Hamilton and Jim Beglin or Ray Houghton. Other pundits used by RTÉ are Kenny Cunningham, Richie Sadlier and Ronnie Whelan. Other commentators are Adrian Eames, Stephen Alkin and Peter Collins.

===== Men's and Women's World Cup coverage =====
RTÉ have had exclusive rights to the World Cup tournament; coverage is on RTÉ2 while rte.ie provides coverage of clashing games. Having been the only national service until the arrival of TG4 and TV3 in the mid-1990s. In 1990 RTÉ made a major investment into the coverage of the tournament which coincided with Ireland's successful campaign under the management of Jack Charlton. The main panel of pundits appeared for the first time consisting of presenter Bill O'Herlihy and pundits John Giles and Eamon Dunphy. For their coverage of 1998 World Cup, RTÉ introduced the comedy Apres Match, a mock of the panel of pundits. The Apres Match pundits first appeared on RTÉ's late night comedy show The End with Barry Murphy. In 1998 the Apres Match pundits for the first time took control of the punditry of the third place play-off and in 2006 surprised themselves and audiences when Barry Murphy playing the part of Liam Brady accurately guess the result – Germany 3 and Portugal 1. In 2006 RTÉ also introduced Graeme Souness as a panellist. Other panellists include Ronnie Whelan, Richie Sadlier, Liam Brady and Denis Irwin. In 2010 Ossie Ardiles, Dietmar (Didi) Hamann and Kevin Kilbane joined the team of panellists. Darragh Maloney, Peter Collins and Con Murphy also present live matches and highlights of the games each night. The matches commentary is provided by George Hamilton, Ray Houghton, Gabriel Egan, Trevor Steven, Stephen Alkin, Damian Richardson, Adrian Eames, Matt Holland and Jimmy Magee.

2014 was Bill O'Herlihy's final World Cup for RTÉ and he has been replaced by Darragh Maloney who was number 2 during the World Cup. Guest pundits used for the World Cup in 2014 were Ossie Ardilles, Didi Hamann, Neil Lennon, Brad Friedel, Paul Clement and Michael O'Neill alongside the existing RTÉ Team of Dunphy, Brady, Giles, Sadlier, Cunningham and Whelan. Commentators were George Hamilton, Stephen Alkin, Peter Collins and Adrian Eames while co-commentators were Ray Houghton, Jim Beglin, Trevor Steven and Brian Kerr.

==== Rugby ====
RTÉ currently holds the rights to the RBS Six Nations Championship until 2017. They previously held the rights to all Ireland games in the tournament until 1998, when BSkyB had the rights to home England games until 2003. Since 2003 the tournament has been broadcast in its entirety live on RTÉ2, since 2010 RTÉ have been host broadcaster for Ireland home games. Ireland's Autumn International Series is also broadcast live on RTÉ, with the station holding the rights until 2017.

RTÉ had shown every Rugby World Cup until 2007 when Setanta Ireland secured the full rights to the 2007 and 2011 editions. With Ireland games at the tournament an A listed event, terrestrial rights went to TV3 for the 2007 edition, the 2011 tournament returned to RTÉ with the station broadcasting 11 games live, including the opening match, all Ireland's games and every game from the quarter finals on. RTÉ and Setanta Sports lost the rights to RWC in 2015 to TV3.

The Heineken Cup was broadcast live on RTÉ from its inception until 2006. In 2006, BSkyB secured the exclusive Irish broadcast rights, highlights remained on RTÉ until the 2011/12 season when TG4 obtained the highlights package in a three-year deal. The Rabo Direct Pro 12 has been broadcast on RTÉ since 2010, previously coverage was on TG4 and Setanta Ireland. Ireland continues to cover Ireland Autumn Internationals signing a deal alongside Sky Sports from 2014 to 2018, Sky replaced BBC as the Nationwide broadcaster for Irish Autumn Internationals.

RTÉ presenter for Rugby is Tom McGurk who usually hosts alongside George Hook, Brent Pope and Conor O'Shea. Other presenters used by RTÉ are Joanne Cantwell and Daire O'Briain while other pundits include Shane Horgan, Ronan O'Gara, Alan Quinlan, Frankie Sheahan, Bernard Jackman, Scott Hastings and Ben Kay. RTÉ's main commentator is Ryle Nugent while George Hamilton and Hugh Cahill also work on the 6 Nations. Co-commentators include Donal Lenihan, Ralph Keyes and Tony Ward.

=== Entertainment ===
RTÉ2's entertainment content is generally aimed at a young audience to that of its sister channel RTÉ One. Since 1988 RTÉ2 has been successful with a number of entertainment shows aimed at the 15- to 35-year-old age group.

In the early years of RTÉ2 music shows on the channel consisted of Music TV USA every Friday night, which was then repeated on Sunday afternoons at 3 pm. In the mid-1980s this was replaced by The Beatbox presented by Ian Dempsey. From 1995, Dave Fanning presented a near identical programme under the new name of 2TV. The Beatbox and 2TV were both broadcast on 2FM RTÉ's popular music radio station.

No Disco was an alternative music show for late night TV from 1993 to 2003, it was hosted by initially by Donal Dineen who left to present radio on Radio Ireland in 1997. Uaneen Fitzsimons took his place on the show, seen as a major upcoming television talent. Fitzsimons died in a road accident in 2000. She had made a significant name for herself on the show, and her knowledge of the music industry, her love of the music and her respect for her guests was apparent throughout the show.

When Under Ether is a music magazine show launched in 2009 and focuses on alternative, indie and electronica music.

In 1997, Later On 2, aired on Tuesday nights, was the arts review show presented by John Kelly who later presented a similar show on RTÉ One called The View. Also in 1997, RTÉ introduced a set of comedy television shows on the newly re-launched N2 service. Don't Feed the Gondolas or DFTG was presented by Seán Moncreiff and later by Brendan O'Connor. In the initial years Brendan O'Connor was one of the main team captains, during the final season Brendan O'Connor became the main host with only three guests. Other shows to begin that year included Podge and Rodge: A Scare at Bedtime and @LastTV, a fast-paced review show with interviews, comedy sketches and music.

In 2009, RTÉ2 revamped its entertainment season with critics and fans still undecided about new titles which included The Byrne Ultimatum, Maeve Higgins' Fancy Vittles, Republic of Telly and Podge & Rodge's Stickit Inn.

=== Cláracha Gaeilge ===
As part of RTÉ Two's re-brand to Network 2 some emphasizes was put on Irish language programming including a daily current affairs show called Cursaí. The series ran from 1988 to 1996 at 19:00 Monday to Friday. The series was later moved around both RTÉ channels. RTÉ retained the arts spin-off programme, Cursaí Ealaíona, into the late 1990s on RTÉ One. RTÉ also broadcast a daily news service in Irish at 20:00 each night, this later moved to RTÉ One.

RTÉ provides Irish language children's programming on both RTÉjr and TRTÉ, much of its Irish language programming has moved to either RTÉ One or TG4. In the early 1990s RTÉ suggested using RTÉ Two's evening schedule for Irish Language programming, rather than starting a new service.

Other Irish language programming on RTÉ Two included school's quiz Eureka and light entertainment show Seán Bán in a Shuí.

== References in media ==
- Saturday Night Live has mentioned this station on two occasions:
  - The recurring sketch "Top O'The Morning" hosted by two barflies Patrick Fitzwilliam (Jimmy Fallon) and William Fitzpatrick (Seth Meyers) is said to have broadcast on RTÉ2.
  - A one-off sketch parodying reality shows that focus on remodelling houses called "You Call This A House, Do Ya?" is also said to have broadcast on RTÉ2.

== See also ==
- List of programmes broadcast by Telefís Éireann
- RTÉ One
