= Don't Feed the Gondolas =

- Also known as: DFTG
- Genre: Comedy, satire
- Written by: Seán Moncrieff
- Directed by: Colm Crowley
- Presented by: Brendan O'Connor (2000–2001); Seán Moncrieff (1997–2000)
- Starring: Eddie Bannon; Des Bishop; Dara Ó Briain; Brendan O'Connor; Kevin McAleer; Patrick McDonnell
- Country of origin: Ireland
- Original language: English
- No. of series: 4

Production
- Producer: Colm Crowley
- Production locations: RTÉ Television Centre, Donnybrook, Dublin 4
- Camera setup: Multi-camera
- Running time: 30–35 minutes

Original release
- Network: Network 2
- Release: 1 December 1997 – 26 March 2001

Don't Feed the Gondolas is an Irish comedy panel show, that ran for four series on Network 2 between 1997 and 2001. The show was hosted by Seán Moncrieff and the longest-serving panellists were Brendan O'Connor and Dara Ó Briain.

The name of the show is attributed to a remark made by a Wicklow County Councillor, Jimmy Miley, during a meeting regarding Blessington Lake. When the meeting proposed putting a gondola on the lake, he remarked: "That's all very well, but who's going to feed it?"

A running gag of the show, whereby the host Seán Moncrieff would make prank calls under the alias 'Monica Loolly' and claim to be from a small town in Galway named Ahascragh.
