= Soupy Norman =

Irish-Polish TV series

- Title card for Soupy Norman
- Genre: Dramedy
- Created by: Barry Murphy, Mark Doherty and Okil Khamidov
- Written by: Paweł Nowicki; Grażyna Wilczyńska; Ilona Morusek; Andrzej Staszczyk; Maura Ładosz
- Directed by: Okil Khamidow; Paweł Chmielewski
- Starring: Aneta Zając, Mateusz Janicki, Wojciech Dąbrowski, Andrzej Buszewicz, Ewa Skibińska, Aleksandra Zienkiewicz, Andrzej Pałkowski
- Voices of: Sue Collins, Mark Doherty, Tara Flynn, Barry Murphy, Luke Murphy, Mario Rosenstock.
- Countries of origin: Ireland; Poland
- Original language: English
- No. of episodes: 8

Production
- Running time: 10 mins
- Production company: ATM Grupa

Original release
- Network: RTÉ
- Release: 24 May – 24 December 2007

Related
- Time Trumpet

Soupy Norman is an eight-part Irish television programme broadcast by RTÉ. It aired weekly on Thursday nights at 23:05 on the RTÉ Two channel, in ten-minute segments. The series ran from May to December 2007. The show is a comedic re-dubbing of the Polish soap opera Pierwsza miłość (First Love), which has been running on Polsat television since 2004.

The series is written and edited by Barry Murphy and Mark Doherty, with additional voices provided by Tara Flynn, Sue Collins, Luke Murphy and Mario Rosenstock. Where the original soap opera dealt with a girl leaving her family behind to go to college, the re-dubbed version of the programme explores the culture shock of a dysfunctional family from Cork in Dublin. The series' surreal humour led to a cult following, with its episodes being popular on YouTube.

A special episode entitled "The Late Late Soupy Norman Tribute" which featured dubbed clips from RTÉ's The Late Late Show as well as clips from previous episodes of Soupy Norman as well as including a new scene of the show. This was broadcast on Christmas Eve 2007.

A pilot sketch for the series initially aired on Armando Iannucci's show Time Trumpet on BBC 2, of which this show was a spin-off.

== Plot ==
The main story of the show concerns Esther, an Irish teenager from Buttevant, County Cork, who travels up to Dublin to study in college. There she encounters strong discrimination, for being a "culchie". She lives with Susan Costigan (or Gleeson, depending on the episode), described by Esther as "a woman with red hair", her daughter Kylie, her son Nathan (who becomes possessed by voices in the episode "Omen"), and her husband Declan. Kylie becomes Esther's friend, and they are seen stealing items (such as a dog) in the episode "Margarita".

The series' other main characters are Esther's father, named Jack, and her Grandad, known to Jack as "Daddy", who live in Buttevant. She has a sister, who is unseen throughout the series, who Jack mentions a few times ("I have two daughters – two of them – and one of them's a boy"). Grandad is an extreme authority figure, as seen in the first episode "Buttevant", often sending Jack to the "bold chair" if he disobeys him in any way. He constantly berates Jack, calling him a "great big disappointment". The two of them are mostly seen drinking vinegar (Jack thinking it was whisky), and being visited by Soupy Norman, the title character.

Soupy is always extremely aggressive and inebriated, and is only ever seen stumbling into the pair's house, delivering rambling, nonsensical rantings to the two men, and always trying to punch Jack. In one episode, he asks to marry Esther's sister. He refers to Esther as "that culchie bitch". The Soupy Norman sequences are always taken from the same scene from First Love, and are repeated every episode.

The series has a subplot of Mark, a Dublin youth, trying to make a living in the city. He does this by applying for increasingly strange jobs, such as a builder, walking a dog with "canine leg disorder", running the "Red Car Bar" nightclub, and helping Satanic spirits in the episode "Omen" (a reference to the film The Omen.)

In the final episode, "Straz", a character called Soupy Dave (who is sometimes seen throughout the series trying to sell Jack and Grandad shady goods such as prawns and whale meat) is contracted by Jack's estranged wife (rarely seen before this episode) to kill him, using a number of surreal techniques.

== Episodes ==
No.	Title	Original release date
1	"Buttevant"	24 May 2007
Esther leaves her home in Buttevant and travels to Dublin on her pet donkey and tries to acclimatise herself to the new environment. Her father is constantly sent to the bold chair by Grandad for not calling him "Grandmaster". Jack and Grandad worry about her and send Soupy Norman to visit and check up on her. He comes back with very few details. To combat homesickness, Esther watches a picture of an "old woman who lives outside the town".
2	"Margarita"	31 May 2007
Esther calls Jack, and asks him to come up to Dublin to visit her. Esther has been staying with Mrs. Gleeson, "a woman with red hair", and her daughter, Kylie. Kylie brings Esther along when she is out stealing. They steal a dog, Margarita (unable to walk due to "canine leg disorder") from Mark, a Dublin youth who has gotten his first job as a dog-walker. Esther later shoots Margarita as she is unable to sell her. Jack talks to Mrs. Gleeson to show him "that thing you do with your eyes", which she does. After returning home to Buttevant, him and Grandad order a pizza from Soupy Norman, which he is unable to give them.
3	"Taxi"	7 June 2007
Jack and Grandad wait 20 hours for the arrival of a taxi to go to the pub. While waiting, they are visited by Soupy Dave, a dodgy salesman, who attempts to sell them many types of fish (including a whale). Meanwhile, in Dublin, Mark is brought to the dole office by a taxi driver, as he is mistaken for a Romanian immigrant. After Soupy Dave is kicked out, Grandad tells Jack the story of how he met his wife, Esther, while working as a taxi driver in Dublin. Soupy Norman, their taxi driver, finally arrives very late in the night but refuses to take Grandad and quotes an exorbitant fare.
4	"Doctors"	14 June 2007
After Grandad starts talking to his eggs (calling it soup), and mistaking the dog for a fish, Jack suggests he go see a doctor. Grandad refuses, calling Jack a "disappointment." Jack visits a friend for advice on Grandad. She advises Jack to bring his dad to Soupy Norman. Soupy Norman's service, "Norman's Head Doctors," later arrives at the house, drunk, and offers very little help. Jack decides that sleep is the best solution. Meanwhile, in Dublin, Kylie is being forced to paint her head a different color by her father and, when she refuses, Mr. Gleeson threatens to leave the house and move to Italy. Mrs. Gleeson looks for medical solutions to stop her husband from leaving, which result in her painting her body five different colours.
5	"Niteklub"	21 June 2007
When Tiny Bob, the young DJ of the "Red Car Bar" (a Dublin nightclub that has a red car suspended in the ceiling) decides to retire and become an old woman, Mark must find a replacement. Kylie helps him find one in DJ Hey, who only plays one song repeatedly. Jack and Grandad argue over whether to go to the disco, when Soupy Norman stumbles in, angry that the club didn't play "The Hucklebuck".
6	"Prodigirl"	28 June 2007
Esther receives constant discrimination for being from outside Dublin, being called a "culchie" and a "dog". Mark deals with an arrogant culchie from Clonmel by using a "spelling spoon" on his car. Esther calls Jack and tells him she's coming home to Buttevant the day after. While Jack and Grandad are drinking vinegar, Soupy Norman comes in asking to marry Jack's daughter, later revealed to be his other daughter, reacting to the thought of Esther with disgust, telling Jack he "wouldn't marry her if you paid me in swans".
7	"Omen"	5 July 2007
The Costigans are worried their son Nathan and daughter Kylie are possessed by demonic spirits, so Susan goes to an exorcist. He openly states her children seem fine, and is only interested in her sexually. Mark needs money, so he gets involved in an internet betting scam run by Nathan. Using the codename "Champagne Supernova", he meets Tony the Cyclist near the statue of Patrick Kavanagh along the Grand Canal. While handing his money on, he is mugged. Meanwhile in Buttevant, Jack and Grandad discuss Soupy Norman going to a black mass. He bursts in, shouting "It's Soupy!".
8	"Straz"	12 July 2007
Jack's estranged wife cannot beat him a staring contest, so she tries to arrange his murder. She first asks a politician called Finbarr, asking him to "put a sword up (Jack's) hole", but he is mainly interested in smelling her wrist. Mark overhears the conversation and phones the Gardaí, who do nothing. Finbarr sets Jack's house on fire, leading Jack to call "the Straz" (referring to the Polish term Straż pożarna, meaning fire brigade). Jack's wife then asks Soupy Dave (previously seen in "Taxi") to murder Jack, but they end up having an affair instead. Soupy Norman comes into Jack and Grandad's house saying he'll kill the two of them with a frying pan. While they think he is joking, Jack is later hit over the head by Soupy.
9	"The Late Late Soupy Norman Tribute"	24 December 2007
A Christmas special, it takes the form of an episode of Irish chat show The Late Late Show, hosted by Pat Kenny, that is paying tribute to the "classic Irish drama" Soupy Norman. Interspersed with clips from the show are interviews with well-known Irish figures, such as sports presenter Jimmy Magee, Father Brian D'Arcy, Ronan Collins and rugby player Brian O'Driscoll. A phone-in competition is held to win twelve Deloreans, and Jack is the winning number. However, he cannot answer the question "what colour would I be if I were a banana?", saying it is purple. In the final scene of the series, Soupy Norman bursts in, angry at Jack because he owes him "a Back to the Future car".

== Legacy ==
Although unsuccessful on its initial broadcast, Soupy Norman acquired a following online and is now considered a cult classic, with a 2018 article on RTÉ's website naming it the third greatest Irish sitcom of all time, and the Rubberbandits commenting "To this day I've no idea how RTE let something that good on TV".
