= Shay Healy =

Irish songwriter and broadcaster (1943–2021)

Shay Healy (29 March 1943 – 9 April 2021) was an Irish songwriter, broadcaster and journalist. He is best known for his role as host of Nighthawks, a RTÉ Television chat show of the late 1980s and early 1990s, and for composing "What's Another Year", Ireland's winning entry in the Eurovision Song Contest 1980.

== Early life ==
Shay Healy was raised along with his five siblings in Sandymount in Dublin. His father, Seamus, was a civil servant and part-time stage actor who performed at the Abbey and Olympia theatres. His mother, Máirín Ní Shúilleabháin, was a singer of Irish traditional songs. She also wrote plays and stories and encouraged young Shay's early talent for writing. This led to his first appearance at the age of 15 on the Irish national radio station, Radió Éireann, reading a self-penned article.

== Career ==
Healy had a varied career, never focusing too intently on any one of his various professional interests. Of his tendency to diversify he once commented: "I know it infuriates some people when you don't pigeonhole yourself, but I don't take on anything that won't stand up to public scrutiny."

=== Songwriting ===
Healy first received attention as a performer of his own "songs of social significance" during the 1960s. Later he wrote comedy songs for Billy Connolly, including "The Orient Express-a tale of intrigue and cross dressing", "The Shitkickers Waltz", and "The Country & Western Supersong". Healy achieved his greatest success as a songwriter with "What's Another Year", which won the Eurovision Song Contest 1980. Over the course of the next 15 years, the song earned him a total of £250,000. In 1983 his song, "Edge of the Universe", sung by Linda Martin, was the overall winner of the Castlebar Song Contest. Under the name of Crack, he and Dave Pennefather released a parody song called "Silly Fellow", which was about Paul McCartney's arrest and jail experience in Japan. Healy and Pennefather also released a parody of Abba's song "Mamma Mia" that they called "Hey C'mere" and credited to Rubbish.

=== Musical theatre ===
In 1977, Healy branched into musical theatre with the script, co-written with Niall Toibin, for a stage production entitled The King. This was a show based on the life and music of Elvis Presley and was premiered at the Cork Opera House two months after the singer's death. In contrast, Healy's rock opera, The Knowledge, failed to receive commercial backing and was premiered in Dundalk by an amateur group in January 1989.

Healy was more successful with his musical, The Wiremen, which received its premiere on 4 May 2005 at Dublin's Gaiety Theatre in a production by John McColgan and Moya Doherty that ran for six weeks. The Wiremen tells the story of the introduction of electricity into County Mayo during the 1950s. In March 2010 the show was revived in an amateur production by the Birr Stage Guild.

=== Broadcasting ===
Healy joined RTÉ Television in 1963 as a trainee cameraman. Within five years he had moved to the other side of the lens with appearances on programmes such as Twenty Minutes With..., Ballad Sheet and Hoot'nany.

In the summer months of 1988 he hosted a series called The Dublin Village with Ingrid Miley it reran on Wednesday nights in 2005 and 2006 on RTE 2.

Between 1988 and 1992 Healy hosted Nighthawks, a late-night satirical chat show broadcast on RTÉ Two, which he later described as "the best four years of my working life". In January 1992, the show became embroiled in political controversy as a result of Healy's interview with former Fianna Fáil Justice Minister Seán Doherty. During the interview, Doherty revealed that some members of the cabinet with whom he served in 1982 had been aware of his order to illegally tap the phones of a number of Irish journalists. The revelation led to the resignation of Taoiseach Charles Haughey a few weeks later.

In January 1995, RTÉ terminated Healy's contract. One of his last shows for the station was Where Are They Now? in which he interviewed former celebrities whose fame had largely faded. Healy then set up his own production company which made a series of television documentaries. His 1995 TV documentary on Irish musician, Phil Lynott, The Rocker, was broadcast on RTÉ Two and BBC Two, and later released as a DVD. In 1998, Healy made two half-hour documentaries for the RTÉ One television series, Against The Odds. The series focused on individuals who had overcome adversity in their lives. Healy's two films featured an actor, Chris Burke, who was born with dwarfism, and a singer, Ronan Tynan, whose legs were amputated when he was twenty.

Among the other TV programmes Healy presented were Reach for the Stars (1971), Hullaballoo (1977), The Birthday Show (1993–1995), Beastly Behaviour (1998–1999), Ireland's Greatest Hits (2001) and A Little Bit Country (2006).

Healy won two Jacob's Awards. He received the first in 1984 for Strawberry Fields Forever, a radio documentary series on the 1960s in Ireland, which he presented and Siobhan McHugh produced. His second award came in 1989 for his television work.

In 2007, Healy joined the judging panel on TG4's talent show, Glór Tíre.

=== Writing ===
In the early 1960s, Healy became Folk Correspondent for Spotlight, an Irish pop music weekly, and he continued to write for the magazine until its demise in the mid-1970s. He wrote a weekly column for the Irish Daily Mail.

The Stunt is the title of Healy's debut novel, published in 1992. It deals with the Irish rock scene and was described by one reviewer as "a more truthful... representation (of) the Irish music scene than The Commitments". His second novel, Green Card Blues, is set among the illegal Irish immigrant community in New York City.

In 2005 On The Road, Healy's memoir of his life in showbusiness, was published.

== Personal life ==
Healy married Dymphna Errity from Landen Road, Ballyfermot at Our Lady of the Assumption Church Ballyfermot on 5 September 1967. They were married for almost 50 years up to Dymphna's death on 10 July 2017. They had two sons, Oisin and Fionain.

In 2004, Healy was diagnosed with the degenerative disorder, Parkinson's disease.

Healy died on 9 April 2021, aged 78.

== Publications ==
- The Stunt, (O'Brien Press, 1992, ISBN 978-0-86278-322-8 )
- Green Card Blues, (O'Brien Press, 1994, ISBN 978-0-86278-386-0)
- Beastly Jokes, (O'Brien Press, 2005, ISBN 978-0-86278-923-7)
- More Beastly Jokes, (O'Brien Press, 2005, ISBN 978-0-86278-924-4)
- On The Road, (O'Brien Press, 2005, ISBN 978-0-86278-949-7)
