= The Works (Irish TV programme) =

- Presented by: John Kelly
- Country of origin: Ireland
- Original language: English
- No. of series: 1

Production
- Production locations: RTÉ Television Centre, Donnybrook, Dublin 4
- Running time: 35 minutes

Original release
- Network: RTÉ One
- Release: 26 January 2012 – present

Related
- The View

The Works is a weekly RTÉ One Arts magazine programme. It is broadcast in Ireland on Thursday nights at 10:15pm, focusing on the best of the week's arts and culture news, covering books, art, film, music and the performing arts. The show is presented by John Kelly and features reports from Sinéad Gleeson, Nadine O'Regan and Kevin Gildea.
