= The View (Irish TV programme) =

- Genre: The arts
- Directed by: Declan Byrne
- Starring: John Kelly
- Country of origin: Ireland
- Original language: English
- No. of series: 12

Production
- Producer: Angela Ryan
- Running time: 40 minutes

Original release
- Network: RTÉ One
- Release: 1999 – 13 December 2011

Related
- Later On 2; The Works

The View is an Irish television programme broadcast on RTÉ One between 1999 and 2011. Presented by John Kelly, it centred on arts-related topics. It was initially known as Later On 2 and was presented by various presenters until John Kelly joined RTÉ from Today FM, Later On 2 was broadcast on first Network 2 in 1997, it later rebranded as The View, it remained in the same broadcast slot but on RTÉ One until 13 December 2011. The View featured reviews of books, exhibitions, films, music, theatre and art. There was a varied panel of contributors who offer their opinions including artists, writers, journalists, film-makers and critics. The programme was broadcast each Tuesday night. The program's producer was Angela Ryan and it was directed by Declan Byrne.

The show's theme track was "Rodney Yates" by Belfast musician David Holmes.

== History ==
In 2006, John Drennan, writing in the Irish Independent, asked if there was "a sweeter sound in Irish journalism than the wails of the effete South Dublin TV critic when RTÉ viewing figures show Killinaskully [a comedy which divided critics and viewers] has trounced John Kelly's The View once again?".

The View Presents.... was a spin-off programme which featured different artist interviews and profiles from around Ireland. A special edition was broadcast on 13 April 2009. Titled The View Presents: Duke Special versus Neil Hannon, it saw Neil Hannon and Duke Special performing songs from each others's careers, a duet together and answering questions put to them by John Kelly.

The last episode of The View was broadcast on RTÉ One on 13 December 2011. A new replacement programme called The Works replaced The View, beginning on 26 January 2012.
