= Nighthawks (TV series) =

- Genre: Comedy
- Directed by: Various
- Presented by: Shay Healy
- Country of origin: Ireland
- Original language: English
- No. of series: 4
- No. of episodes: 298

Production
- Producers: David Blake-Knox; Anne Enright; Briain MacLochlainn
- Camera setup: Multi-camera
- Running time: 30–40 mins

Original release
- Network: Network 2
- Release: 11 October 1988 – 16 April 1992

Related
- Later On 2

Nighthawks is an Irish television series broadcast on Network 2 (now known as RTÉ Two). It was presented by Shay Healy. It was part of the major re-brand of RTÉ Two as Network 2 in 1988.

The programme, which began broadcasting in the late 1980s, was a three times-weekly, late-night series. Nighthawks was produced for its first two seasons by David Blake-Knox. In its third season the series producer was Anne Enright, later to become a Booker Prize-winning novelist. In its final season, it was produced by Briain Mac Lochlainn. The Irish Film and Television Awards-nominated director Charlie McCarthy and producers David McKenna and Philip Kampf also worked on the programme. The show's signature tune was composed by Ronan Johnston. It also featured several contributory sketches from Nuala Kelly, Joe Taylor, and Orla McGovern.

An early star of the series was Irish comedian Kevin McAleer, who specialised in rambling but amusing monologues to camera. The Irish actor/comedian-turned British television presenter Graham Norton also appeared on Nighthawks early in his career.

Nighthawks was produced by RTÉ Raidió Teilifís Éireann. It was broadcast three nights per week. The regular soap opera was originally written by David Blake-Knox, and started off as a two-hander between "Hay Healy", and Tanya (the comic creation of Joanne McAteer) They were later joined by burly Russian character Boris, played by Stanley Townsend. Many stand-ups, comedy actors and comedy writers wrote for the show but, from the second season, the late Gerry McNamara was the chief writer and script editor. Morgan Jones, Joe Taylor and Ann Marie Hourihane were some of the regular "company" actors. Hourihane also wrote a number of sketches and presented a weekly film review. Nighthawks was devised by David Blake Knox. John Comiskey created the shooting "grammar" of the series, and Shay Healy introduced the "4" Minute" Interview.

In 1992, Brian Mac Lochlainn won a Jacob's Award for his production of Nighthawks.

In December 2012 a one-off special called Nighthawks Rehashed was aired on RTÉ. The documentary took a look at the unique show that mixed comedy and current affairs with a compilation of vintage interviews from the series.
