= Good Grief Moncrieff! =

- Genre: Talk show
- Presented by: Seán Moncrieff
- Starring: Paul Wonderful and the Glam Tarts
- Country of origin: Ireland
- Original language: English
- No. of series: 1
- No. of episodes: 11

Production
- Production locations: RTÉ Television Centre, Donnybrook, Dublin 4
- Running time: 65 minutes

Original release
- Network: RTÉ One
- Release: 15 June – 24 August 1996

Good Grief Moncrieff! is a talk show hosted by Seán Moncrieff. The show aired live on Saturday nights as a summer "filler" between 15 June and 24 August 1996.

Preceded by ?	Saturday night summer programming on Telefís Éireann; 1996	Succeeded by Kennedy
