= Barry Murphy (comedian) =

Irish comedian

Barry Murphy is an Irish comedian whose notable appearances include a starring role in the satirical show Après Match. As a member of Mr Trellis he founded The Comedy Cellar in Dublin in 1989. He mostly appears as his German alter ego Gunther Grun and was recognised as one of The 10 Kings Of Irish Comedy over the last twenty years by Hot Press. Murphy hosted the 2002 Irish Film and Television Awards (IFTA) and was himself nominated for an IFTA for Script Television for Little White Lie in 2009 and Irish Pictorial Weekly in 2014. He is the only comedian to have played at every Kilkenny Cat Laughs festival since it started in 1994.

== Television appearances ==
- Father Ted (Channel 4)
- The Stand Up Show (BBC)
- Writer and presenter of The End (RTÉ)
- Writer and presenter of Melty Hughes' Olympics (RTÉ)
- Writer and presenter of Frank's Euro Ting (RTÉ, Euro 96)
- Writer and performer on Après Match - (RTÉ)
- Writer and performer on Couched (RTÉ, sitcom with Mark Doherty)
- The Empire Laughs Back (BBC Northern Ireland)

Writer and performer on 'Stand & Deliver' RTÉ 2 2010/11

- Time Trumpet (BBC, with Mark Doherty)
- Writer and performer on the soap opera parody Soupy Norman (RTÉ, sitcom with Mark Doherty)

Devised, wrote and co-produced "Irish Pictorial Weekly" 2014
