= Seán Moncrieff =

Irish broadcaster, journalist and writer

- Born: 1961 or 1962 (age 64–65); London England
- Education: Bachelor of Arts: English and Philosophy
- Alma mater: University College Dublin (UCD)
- Occupations: Broadcaster, journalist, writer
- Employer: Newstalk
- Known for: The End, Good Grief Moncrieff!, Don't Feed the Gondolas, The Restaurant

Seán Moncrieff is an Irish broadcaster, journalist and writer. He currently presents the weekday afternoon radio show Moncrieff on Newstalk and is a columnist for The Irish Times. His television credits include his own Raidió Teilifís Éireann (RTÉ) chat show Good Grief Moncrieff!, comedy panel show Don't Feed the Gondolas, and The Restaurant of which he is the voice. Moncrieff has also written novels and non-fiction.

== Early life ==
Seán Moncrieff was born in London to a mother from County Mayo, Ireland, and a father from Edinburgh, Scotland. When he was twelve, his family moved to Ballinasloe, County Galway, where he attended Garbally College. After school he studied journalism in Dublin and, later on, did a degree in English and Philosophy in University College Dublin (UCD).

== Broadcasting and journalism ==
Moncrieff initially worked as a freelance journalist in Dublin, writing on everything from flower shows to the conflict in the Middle East. He then moved to London, where he worked for the television trade magazine Broadcast, and then as a researcher for Channel 4.

Upon returning to Ireland, he resumed his career as a freelance journalist, but also began working for Raidió Teilifís Éireann (RTÉ). He started on radio with the daily It Says In the Papers, and followed this up on television by presenting The End, Good Grief Moncrieff!, Black Box and Don't Feed the Gondolas. On RTÉ Radio he presented the Saturday morning show The Right Side, and was a regular contributor to The Arts Show, The Marian Finucane Show and A Living Word. In the UK he has worked for the BBC, Channel 4 and Channel 5, both as a scriptwriter and presenter.

Also on RTÉ, Moncrieff has presented The Big 40, a celebration of forty years of Irish television, Ireland Undercover, HQ, The Holiday Quiz, and he is the voice of The Restaurant. In 2014 he presented the TV3 quiz show "Crossfire".

Moncrieff currently presents The Moncrieff Show each weekday afternoon, between 2.00pm and 4:00pm on the Irish independent radio station Newstalk. Since going on air in 2004, the show has won eleven PPI Radio Awards. In 2016, Moncrieff was named speech broadcaster of the year.

== Writing ==
His first novel, Dublin, was published in May 2001 by Doubleday publishers and reached the bestseller lists in Ireland. A non-fiction book, Stark Raving Rulers: twenty minor despots of the twenty-first century, was published in October 2004, followed by God, A Users' Guide in 2006. A second novel, The History of Things, was published in September 2007 and praised by the Irish Independent, who said it was "arguably the best Irish novel of the year". A third novel, The Angel of the Streetlamps was published in December 2012. His sixth book, "The Irish Paradox" was published in 2015.

== Awards ==
Moncrieff has been voted Radio's Sexiest Voice.

The Moncrieff Show on Newstalk has won twelve PPI/IMRO radio awards in a number of categories and two gongs at the New York radio Awards.
