= Kevin McAleer =

Irish professional stand-up comedian (born 1956)

- Born: 1956 (age 69–70); Omagh, County Tyrone, Northern Ireland
- Notable work: Nighthawks; Derry Girls

Comedy career
- Years active: 1980s – 2024

Kevin McAleer (born 1956) is an Irish stand-up comedian. He came to prominence on the RTÉ television show Nighthawks which began broadcasting in the late 1980s. McAleer became known for his three-minute sketches of surreal rustic tales told in his slow County Tyrone drawl. One critic said that McAleer "put the dead back into deadpan". In 2022 he toured his one-man show entitled Why am I Here and played the part of boring Uncle Colm in Derry Girls on Channel 4. In 2024, he announced his retirement from stand-up comedy, with final shows in Dublin and Belfast.

== Personal life and writing ==
McAleer lives in Omagh, County Tyrone; he believes his comic talents blossomed in the classroom and he lived in Barcelona, Spain, for a period.

In July 2009, McAleer stated that he has completed a first draft of a book about John F. Kennedy. The book remains unfinished. He writes in his office in Omagh and cites Flann O'Brien, James Joyce, Don DeLillo, Umberto Eco and Nikolai Gogol as influences.

McAleer writes occasional comic pieces for the Irish Times, responding to current events such as Brexit.
