= John Kelly (Irish broadcaster) =

Irish broadcaster and writer (born 1965)

John Kelly (born 31 May 1965 in Enniskillen) is an Irish broadcaster and writer. He presented The View on RTÉ One, The JK Ensemble on RTÉ lyric fm and Other Voices. He presents Mystery Train on Lyric and a one-hour show on RTÉ 2XM called Radio Clash.

== Early life and work ==
John Kelly was born in Enniskillen in 1965, the only child of Tommy and Lily Kelly. He studied law at Queen's University Belfast, completed his postgraduate professional qualifications at the Institute of Professional legal studies and then promptly joined the BBC in Belfast to present the radio music show The Bottom Line. In 1991 he won the Sony Award was for best daily music show – The John Kelly Programme. Also in 1991 he won the EMA Award for Television Personality of the Year. He was, at the time, presenting an arts programme 29 Bedford Street. In 1992 he won an EMA Award was for best radio documentary – Maritime Blues which told the story of the club which was at the heart of the Irish rhythm and blues boom and which spawned the likes of Van Morrison and Them. Kelly interviewed just about every key player including Van Morrison and Rory Gallagher.

== Career ==
=== Radio ===
In the late nineties Kelly moved to Dublin to present Eclectic Ballroom on what was then called Radio Ireland and which later became Today FM – forming a successful night-time partnership with Donal Dineen whose Here Comes the Night immediately followed The Eclectic Ballroom. He moved to RTÉ Radio in 2000 to present Mystery Train and won the PPI Award for Music Broadcaster of the Year. Elvis Costello showed up regularly to co-present.

"An extraordinary programme", said Bono, "To go from Duke Ellington to Björk. To go from Woody Guthrie to The Virgin Prunes. It's an amazing thing to pull off. There's nothing like it anywhere in the world." When Mystery Train was suddenly taken off air in 2007 it was an event of some national controversy with the matter being raised in the Irish Senate. The final show was a featured as a news item on the national RTÉ 9 o'clock news and U2 and Elvis Costello appeared in gestures of support. Kelly admitted in interviews that he seriously considered quitting altogether at this time but late in 2008 he moved to RTÉ Lyric FM to present a new and very different show called The JK Ensemble. Although RTÉ Lyric FM has traditionally been a classical music station The JK Ensemble covers everything from J.S. Bach to Brian Eno and from Miles Davis to Sigur Rós. John Kelly surprised everyone with an insistence on playing Igor Stravinsky, John Coltrane, Shostakovich, Lou Reed and Kurt Weill in the middle of the day but, again, the show was an instant success which significantly raised the profile of the station. When Kelly was on leave on one occasion the show was guest presented by two stars of The Wire – Reg. E Cathey and Clarke Peters. Kelly presented the final episode of The JK Ensemble on 11 August 2017. Kelly also presents Radio Clash on the digital channel 2XM which is a mixture of reggae, dub, punk and tracks from contemporary acts like TV on the Radio, White Stripes and Arcade Fire.

In 2017, John Kelly re-launched The Mystery Train on RTÉ Lyric FM. The Sunday edition of the show is entitled Mystery Train Sunday Service and features a special guest, who selects the music. Guests have included Neil Hannon, Dorothy Cross, Cillian Murphy, Lisa Dwan and Gavin Friday.

=== Television ===
The View was RTÉ's only arts weekly review programme broadcast on Tuesday nights. It ran from 1999 to 2011. A panel, with Kelly in the chair, and his pals in the other chairs, discussed movies, theatre and the visual arts with a musical performance at the end with acts such as Bono and Edge, Lyle Lovett and Brad Mehldau. The View has also been the scene of the debut performances by many acts including the 2006 winner of the Choice Music Prize Julie Feeney, and Josh Ritter. The View Presents was a separate strand of interview specials where Kelly talked at length with the likes of Seamus Heaney, Neil Jordan, The Edge, Steve Reich and Emmylou Harris. For several seasons he presented the RTÉ music series Other Voices where he introduced artists like Ray Davies, Amy Winehouse and Elbow from a small church in Dingle in County Kerry. Most recently he co-presented the series with BBC Radio 1's Annie Mac.

Since 2011 he has presented The Works on RTÉ 1.

=== Interviewer ===
Over the years he has interviewed (for TV, radio and The Irish Times) many leading figures in the music and arts world – Van Morrison, Lou Reed, David Bowie, Seamus Heaney, Nina Simone, Brian Eno, Al Green, Steve Reich, Peter Brook, John McGahern, Solomon Burke, George Martin, Sam Phillips, U2, Brian Wilson, Elvis Costello, Emmylou Harris, Vanessa Redgrave, Yoko Ono, B. B. King, John Berger, Herbie Hancock, Townes Van Zandt, Laurie Anderson, Mose Allison, Philip Glass, Screaming Jay Hawkins, Jimmy Scott, Philip Lynott, Randy Newman, Peter O'Toole and many more.

=== Journalism ===
Kelly has written a column for The Irish Times and contributed to numerous other publications on matters musical and cultural.

=== Books ===
At university and immediately afterwards John Kelly was primarily known as a poet and was published in most of the important journals and magazines. He gave many readings in Ireland, Great Britain and the US. Although he had featured in several significant anthologies he never published a volume of his own until 2018 when Notions was published. Instead he took to writing prose.

The Little Hammer (Jonathan Cape 2000) and Sophisticated Boom Boom – a novel about music – was also published by Jonathan Cape in 2003. It was singled out for special praise by the writer William Gibson when asked by the (London) Independent what books he had by his bedside. He said it was "A universally applicable evocation of male adolescence and of the gifts that music brings." The Little Hammer was also critically well received with the Guardian describing it as, "Immediate, passionate and shot through with descriptive brilliance, the narrative voice is both charming and convincing." The List said it was "Completely illuminating. A book to be read and savoured." The Guardian called it "A witty, inventive, exhilarating novel." His novel From Out of the City was published in 2014 and was shortlisted for the Irish Book Awards.

=== Poetry ===
Kelly's debut volume of poetry, Notions, was published in 2018 by Dedalus Press. In his review for the Dublin Review of Books, Gerard Smyth described Notions as an 'impressively accomplished collection' while Caitriona O'Reilly, writing in the Irish Times, praised Kelly's 'poems of great tenderness and linguistic skill'.

=== Music ===
Kelly has played harmonica on stage with Van Morrison, Tom Robinson, Horslips, Gavin Friday and Paul Brady and also co-wrote half a dozen songs on the Paul Brady album Say What You Feel.

=== Other work ===
Kelly narrated U2's Missing Sarajevo DVD documentary, filmed his own documentary on Elvis Presley in Tennessee and Mississippi and travelled further throughout the United States with the RTÉ travel programme No Frontiers. Other musical trips for radio have taken him to Senegal, Estonia and China. He worked as a music consultant on the Neil Jordan movie The Good Thief – which explains all the Leonard Cohen in the film.

== Interviews ==
- Toner Quinn (1 November 2008). "Turn it Up: John Kelly". The Journal of Music.
- Peter Murphy. "John Kelly | Music | Interview". Hot Press.
