= List of The Den characters =

One of the successes of children's television strand, The Den, was its ability to continually produce an array of successful characters, many of whom then went on to achieve fame in other fields, both nationally and internationally.

== Generation I ==
Generation I include extraterrestrials Zig and Zag and their dog Zuppy, all of whom were present from the second season of Dempsey's Den. Zig and Zag left in 1993 but Zuppy remained to become one of the longest serving members of The Den team (alongside Don Conroy, a human).

=== Zig and Zag ===
Zig and Zag with original playmate Ian Dempsey in the early days.

Zig and Zag, the first (and possibly the most famous), are ten-year-old alien twins from the planet Zog. They were a very successful franchise on their own, spawning parody tapes, comic books and car toys. A popular toy throughout the late 1980s were zogabongs, the unusual antennae on both Zig's and Zag's heads.

Zig and Zag arrived from the Planet Zog hoping to collect jokes. They were adopted by the young television presenter, Ian Dempsey, and became regular features on Dempsey's Den whilst living at Number Ten Celebrity Square (it has since been demolished and now has a Lidl on it). At first they would appear separately on designated days of the week and once a week together, then their appearances became more frequent. Zag was responsible for introducing Dustin to celebrity acclaim when he won him in a golf game, however both he and Zig had a difficult relationship with the turkey. An offer arrived from Channel 4 and the two extraterrestrials left The Den in the summer of 1993.

Zig and Zag received a presenting job on Channel 4's The Big Breakfast, whereas Zuppy, Soky and Dustin remained. Zig and Zag returned to Ireland in the late 1990s to host 2Phat, a music-quiz show along with their father, Ray D'Arcy, in which students had the chance to win a limited edition scooter. The show ran for two seasons and was well received. Other popular characters on the show were Velcro Girl, DJ Lee, Zag's alter ego Reverend Groove and Zag's alter ego Captain Pillowcase. After a period of disappearance, they returned to launch a multi-layered assault on the media in October/November 2008, first featuring on their own television special, Best Bitz From Back Den and later appearing on the prime-time chat show, Twiggery Tonight, and their old father's radio show, The Ray D'Arcy Show, to promote its release as a DVD.

Zig was voiced by Ciarán Morrison and Zag was voiced by Mick O'Hara (who also voiced Rodge and Podge respectively).

=== Zuppy ===
Zuppy, a dog belonging to Zig and Zag, rarely appeared on screen but more often in comic books. Blue with pink zogabongs, he had tendency to make rather high-pitched yelping barking noises akin to dogs of Earthly origin (though towards the end of his run, Dustin's experimentation with hypnosis caused Zuppy to begin clucking, akin to a chicken). Zuppy would maul Zag for no apparent reason. Zag was repeatedly left smarting from these encounters, during which Zuppy would growl. The other members of The Den saw this as friendly play between the two, and Zag often seemed unsure of Zuppy's attitude towards him. Zuppy got his name from John Balfe after responding to a competition. In return he got a year's supply of lollipops from Chupa Chups. Zuppy occasionally still featured in programming during the 21st-century, alongside Soky in the early morning shows.

== Generation II ==
Generation II began to be introduced just before Zig and Zag's departure, most notably Dustin the Turkey, who was won by Zag in a game of golf. Characters such as Soky, Ted, Podge and Snotser were present throughout the D'Arcy era and, with the exception of Podge (who moved to late night television show A Scare at Bedtime with brother Rodge after both were thwarted in their evil attempts to ruin Christmas), into the McCaul era.

=== Dustin ===
Dustin at Christmas time in 1998, sporting the shirt of his beloved Manchester United

Dustin was originally introduced in December 1989 when Zag secured him as a prize for finishing last in a golf tournament against Ronan Collins.

Originally intended to be cooked, Dustin remained unaware of his impending fate as Christmas approached. However, the cast were emotionally moved by this and could not bring themselves to kill and stuff him.

There is also a school of thought that Dustin was originally conceived as a turkey vulture, which would be consistent with his rather large and most un-turkeylike beak.

However, as he became increasingly involved with Christmas pantomime shows in Dublin, and releasing CDs aimed at the Christmas market, he seems to have mutated into a turkey (the usual bird for Christmas dinner in Ireland).

Portrayed as a builder from Dublin's Northside, Dustin later spun off to his own programme, DDN (Dustin's Daily News), in the September 2005 re-launch and later had his own weekly show called The Once a Week Show.

He represented Ireland at Eurovision Song Contest 2008 in Belgrade. On Today FM's The Ray D'Arcy Show on 14 November 2008, Dustin was coerced into "doing the flap-flaps" for a live audience at Vicar Street - The Den team would regularly coerce Dustin, through use of flattering comparisons, into doing the "flap-flaps" (a unique and humorous dance with his wings), the result of which was the collapse of all into convulsions of laughter, invariably sending Dustin into an embarrassed rage.

Dustin was voiced by John Morrison.

=== Snotser ===
Snotser was an extremely high-voiced member of Dustin's construction crew.

Initially left to the imagination of viewers as he was merely an offstage voice for many years, Snotser was finally seen in the closing seconds of the first episode of the "treehouse season" during Den TV.

The rest of the cast (and the audience) had been awaiting his arrival for the whole day, yet D'Arcy, Dustin and Soky submissively exited for home, leaving the audience to think that Snotser would remain an unseen, offstage character. However, as that day's edition of The Den was about to conclude, Snotser entered the empty studio, accompanied by apologies for his late arrival. His appearance revealed him to be a rotund pink pig.

Snotser was a fairly popular character and appeared on several tracks of Dustin's parody album Faith of Our Feathers. Possessing a deeply high-pitched voice he became recognisable for his catchphrase: "Ah yeah, top man!" and often sported a black leather jacket. His surname was Galligan.

Snotser was voiced by Joey Morrison, who also voiced Soky.

=== Soky ===
Soky the sock monster first appeared shortly after Zig and Zag's departure in late 1993.

Soky was born when Dustin neglected to do the laundry for a number of weeks, despite constant nagging and complaints from Ray D'Arcy about the smell of the socks in the linen bin that could be seen at the back of the set, behind where D'Arcy was seated.

After some time, the lid of the linen bin could be seen to lift at various times during the day, and a pair of big eyes would peek out. These eyes turned out to belong to Soky the sock monster, who then joined the gang, believing D'Arcy to be his mother and calling him "Mammy Ray".

Possessing hair of old, smelly socks, viewers were invited to send their own samples to The Den as presents for Soky. His prized possession was his blue bucket. He would often mention his best friend Thomas from playschool.

Presented as a pre-school character, his naivety increased his affection among younger viewers. Not ever-present, in later years he could more commonly be found during early morning broadcasts of The Den.

A shot of Soky taken at Christmas time in 1998

One Christmas Soky, Damien McCaul and Dustin travelled to New York in search of a Mr Micro Blue Bucket with Removable Arms, a present that Soky desired but which would not be available in Ireland until the following March. After persistently demanding that Soky be granted this gift and searching through the internet (overcoming Derek Davis's diet tips and Pat Kenny's guide on how to be "an insufferable bore"), Dustin discovered that 100 Mr Micro Blue Bucket action figures would be delivered to F.A.O. Schwarz, the largest toy store in the world located in Manhattan, New York, on Christmas Eve (the following morning). He then persuaded McCaul to bring himself and Soky there instead of surrendering to McCaul's preferred option of buying LEGO for Soky. Despite McCaul explaining that there was no way they could fly to New York with so little time left, they were soon inside F.A.O. Schwarz. The naive but kind-hearted Soky was exuberant, as Dustin pointed out Laa-Laa the Teletubby, and wanted to find presents for his Mammy (Geri Maye) his best friend (Thomas), and "all the boys and girls in playschool". Despite Soky being a preschooler, McCaul and Dustin allowed him to wander off in the busy store, whilst they went in search of Mr Micro Blue Bucket, Dustin mistaking a Furby for Anne Doyle along the way.

Soky's pet cat is Charlie. In 2021, it was revealed he was named after the Greek philosopher Socrates.

Soky was voiced by Joey Morrison, who also voiced Snotser.

=== Ted ===
Ted is a soft plush panda who appears as a running in-joke between Dempsey/D'Arcy and Zig and Zag, during the earliest years of Dempsey's Den, he originally appeared in the background at the shelves of the set, during later years, he rarely appeared active, but every few days a photograph would be put on display of Ted in a famous location or launching an assault on a famous person or a viewer. He would often arrive in the studio during this time, but only upon the absence of the presenter. One running gag had Zig and Zag tell him to "Keep it down Ted!" Ted, of course, never actually made a sound. A (later) running joke had Ted wrestle with Ray D'Arcy, which involved the (impossibly large) plush panda hurling himself at D'Arcy (whether he expected it or not). An often exhausted D'Arcy then had to defend himself from these assaults by hurling Ted offscreen again, his exhaustion often becoming more emphasised when Ted hurled himself once more at D'Arcy to repeat the assault. Ted last appeared at a 2008 reunion to assault D'Arcy once more, this time on live radio. He sometimes later appeared in the 2020 reboot of The Den.

D'Arcy himself admitted on his radio show that Ted only tended to attack on days when he was hungover or not feeling the best. This always happened when Dustin was absent, and afterwards he would never believe D'Arcy when he tried to convince him that Ted had attacked him. Ted left after FBJ's departure, and later appeared in the opening credits of iD. He was last heard of breaking through security at Vicar Street to assault D'Arcy during a morning radio broadcast from the venue, about half an hour after the Today FM newsreader, Sinead Spain, ominously aired a newsflash that a UFO had been spotted flying over Drogheda with no sign of life on board. D'Arcy was heard to wrestle the bear to the ground; later comparisons seemed to indicate that this particular Ted was at least one foot taller than D'Arcy.

=== Podge ===
Podge was originally introduced as a simple puppet that Zag found amongst the rubbish behind an old joke shop. He turned out to be an evil little boy, who with every appearance caused mischief and instigated conspiracies, and would initially only appear when Zag was there alone and fool him into some badness by convincing him to listen to his instructions, often saying: "All I want is a friend and a cuddle". Zag set up his own 5-minute feature titled The Podge and Zag Show and played around with Podge, only to be interrupted by a scornful Zig. In later years, Podge would terrorise the entire cast, humans and all. One year he took over The Den and fired everyone, renaming The Den as "Bun's Bungalow" and promising wall-to-wall Echo Island all day, every day. In the end, it transpired to have been a terrible dream... or was it? Another year, at the end of Dustin's presidential campaign, Podge fooled the cast into believing that Dustin had won the election. From this point onwards Podge was joined by his brother Rodge. Podge left The Den; however, his television career did not end there. He later reappeared on RTÉ Television co-hosting his own show called A Scare at Bedtime alongside Rodge. When that proved popular, the brothers were given their own late-night weekday talk show called The Podge and Rodge Show set in their country home, Ballydung Manor.

Podge was voiced by Mick O'Hara and Rodge was voiced by Ciarán Morrison (who also voiced Zag and Zig respectively).

== Generation III ==
Generation III were introduced in the post-McCaul era, in particular through the use of spin-off shows. Martin Duck was a feature of the mock news episodes, Dustin's Daily News.

=== Simon and Stephen Trowel ===
Simon Trowel (an obvious pun on Simon Cowell) is a miserable "twin" of Dustin, though he insists he is a troll rather than a turkey. Before Halloween 2005, he kidnapped Dustin and tried to take his place, so he could steal the prizes available in the special Halloween pumpkin game. He made Francis and Soky drink a special brew that made them think he was Dustin. When they went off set, the TV screen at the back would show Dustin locked away, begging the viewers to help him get out and tell Francis and Soky that Simon Trowel's out there instead of him. On some occasions Simon was there when this happened, and he sneered at Dustin, declaring to the viewers that they would never get him out. Dustin eventually escaped and RTÉ News reported that he was spotted running down the M50 the day he escaped.

On 2 October 2005, Simon Trowel appeared alongside Dustin in a sketch on Dustin's Daily News, in which the pair tried to get a rock music contract, and he was introduced to the record producer as being Dustin's cousin.

Simon Trowel's brother, Stephen, never appeared, presumably of his shy, sneaky nature.

=== Martin Duck ===
Martin Duck on an appearance on Dustin's Daily News. In the background is the logo of his proposed takeover show Duck Daily News.

Martin Duck is a mysterious duck who began "hacking" into transmissions of Dustin's Daily News from a makeshift studio in a garden shed in January 2006. He seemed to have some sort of grudge against Dustin, who declared him a "wanted duck" and began distributing wanted posters to viewers who wrote, texted or e-mailed in to DDN. Eventually, Duck was tracked down to a shed in Blackpool, County Cork, on property believed to be owned by a P. Carleton. Duck then went on the run to elude capture. He soon resumed his pirate broadcasts from a "secret" location, giving viewers cryptic clues as to where that location was. A huge prize package was offered to the person who finally captured Martin, as he stepped up his campaign against Dustin by hijacking certain elements of his show, such as taking over one of the regional RTÉ studios to "play" the "Dustin's Masterbrain" game, and kidnapping Dustin's co-presenter, Sinéad, and taking her place on one show. In the final show of the season, on 29 April 2006, Duck was located and forcibly removed from his underground hiding place in Limerick. Later he said he is now Dustin's biggest fan. In 2007, he returned again, now in a campervan driving all around the country and kidnapping Sinéad again. Dustin and crew managed to capture him just as he was about to take over the RTÉ Newsroom. He has not been seen since.

=== Magic Bunny ===
Magic Bunny is a rabbit who lives in a hat. He talks in a high pitched voice, is a good friend of both Soky and Zuppy and usually appeared alongside Zuppy.

== Generation IV ==
Generation IV saw Soky, Zuppy, Dustin and Magic Bunny leave without explanation, and new characters were introduced.

=== Ogie ===
Ogie is a blue, furry alien, rabbit like creature who comes from the planet Hubble. Ogie stays with Emma while trying to get home. Ogie frequently talks to his mother and father via computer.

=== Mammy ===
Ogie's mother, whom he calls Mammy is very similar to Ogie, she is pink instead of blue and wears pearls around her neck. She frequently talks to Ogie via computer

=== Daddy ===
Ogie's father, whom he calls Daddy, is similar to Ogie, although he does have a beard. He frequently talks to Ogie via computer.

=== Bo ===
Bo (the Irish for cow) is a brown and white calf who stays with Reuben, a friend of Emma. Although Bo was introduced at the same time as Ogie and his family, she is rarely seen with him.
