= RTÉ Young People's Programming =

Kids' division of RTÉ (Radio & Television of Ireland)

RTÉ Young People's Programming (RTÉ YPP)
- Type: RTÉ Television and Independent Commissions
- Industry: Media
- Headquarters: RTÉ Television Centre, Donnybrook; Dublin 4, Ireland
- Area served: Ireland and Northern Ireland (but some productions exported internationally)
- Key people: Suzanne Kelly (Head of Children's and Young Peoples Content)
- Services: Radio and television broadcasts
- Owner: RTÉ
- Divisions: RTÉ KIDSjr; RTÉ Kids; RTÉ Jr Radio
- Website: RTÉ KIDS

RTÉ Young People's Programming (Irish: Cláracha do Dhaoine Óga RTÉ), also known as RTÉ Kids, is a division of Raidió Teilifís Éireann (RTÉ) and provides a range of national and international children's programming for RTÉ television, radio and online and also for the independent Irish language broadcaster TG4.

It broadcasts in English and Irish. The division is based at the RTÉ Television Centre in Donnybrook, Dublin. The department covers both Radio, Online and Television output for young people across RTÉ.

Up to 2016 RTÉ's Young People's Programming Department produced and commissioned content. Independent productions consists largely of animations, live action and entertainment programming, while much of the RTÉ's own produced children's content was studio based. In 2016 RTÉ began cutting funding to Young People's Programming, this resulted in RTÉ axing all in-house productions for children, with no increases to funding for independent producers.

== Current programming ==
- Let's Find Out, science entertainment series
- Bush Kids
- Wild Atlantic Kids
- Storybud (story time with famous faces)
- X Marks the Spot (comedy/drama)
- The Imagination Machine
- Will Sliney's Storytellers
- Shorts Yule Love (short animations for the Christmas season)
- Halloween Shorts (short animations for the Halloween season)
- Marten's Shed
- Gamer Mode
- Critters TV
- Junk Kouture
- Ladybird and Bee
- Royals Next Door
- Squad Gold
- Alva's World (Online safety for pre-schoolers)

=== 2020s ===
==== COVID-19 programming ====
With the introduction of COVID-19 lockdowns in Ireland, RTÉ began broadcasting Home School Hub to help parents and children with home schooling during the period. RTÉ aired the show from 2020 until 2021, it did not return for the autumn schedule in 2021, as lockdowns came to a close. In 2020, the cast of Home School Hub returned for a Christmas special.

==== Identity ====
By 2021, both TRTÉ and RTÉjr websites had been replaced by a new brand, RTÉ Kids. The brand began to be used more often by the end of the 2021, with TRTÉ largely being dropped save for programming hours on RTÉ2, a continued trend from the late 2010s.

In December 2024 TRTÉ was rebranded as RTÉ Kids.

== Cost-cutting ==
In mid-2016 RTÉ's Two Tube (previously ID and TTV) finished up for its normal season and then moved online for the rest of 2016. In 2016 RTÉ announced that it would move all production to independent producers. In February 2017 RTÉ's Two Tube was cancelled. Under pressure the management team assured the public that RTÉ "is not reducing its commitment to younger people's programmes, nor its spend", however they had already cut funding to children's content by 25%, this was then followed in 2017 with a further cut of 50% bring their total spend on Young People's content to just €3.9 million. In 2018 RTÉ increased funding to €5.8 million but by 2019 had cut it back to €4.7m, this compares to support provided to children's content in 2010 and 2011 of €11m. By 2020 funding for Young People's programming came to €5.5 million.

== History ==
=== Early history ===
On 1 January 1926, 2RN started broadcasting. It was Ireland's first radio station. On 24 May 1926, there was the first advertised news bulletin on 2RN.

=== 1940s ===
In 1946 Radio Éireann was providing 30 minutes per day to children's programming, across music, plays, competitions and talk. In 1948 a series titled Arts Adventures began broadcasting with Sean Bunny and Marion King.

=== 1960s ===
On 31 December 1961 Ireland's first national television station, Telefís Éireann, was officially launched. A new Television Complex was built at Donnybrook in Dublin.

- Dáithí Lacha
- Telefís Scoile – 1964 Schools Television, educational programming for secondary school students.

=== 1970s ===
- Wanderly Wagon

=== 1980s ===
By the end of the 1980s all most all Children's and Young People's content had been moved to RTÉ2, prior to 1988 most of this type of content was dotted around the RTÉ One and RTÉ2 schedules. In 1988 Dempsey's Den/The Den, RTÉ's daily programme for children, moved from RTÉ ONE to RTÉ2 (then known as Network 2), it also moved from 16:00 to 15:00, presenting children's programming for 3 hours per day. It did not air during the summer months until 1998, when it became Den2. The programme was largely known as The Den, with its final season in 2010 when it was replaced by RTÉjr and TRTÉ.

On Network 2, The Den was bookended by the pre-school programming (Bosco) and teen programming (Jo Maxi). Bosco was produced from 1983 to 1987 and repeat until the arrival of The Morbegs in the 1990s. Jo Maxi ran until the mid-1990s and was replaced in favour of a younger programme called Echo Island.

Saturday morning programming in the 1980s aired on RTÉ One from 09:00. The first Saturday morning children's programme was Anything Goes. In the mid-1980s it was replaced by Pajo's Junkbox, which would later become Pajo's Whole Shebang and Pajo and the Salty Frog. It was followed by Action Station Saturday, which would be replaced in the 1990s by Scratch Saturday.

Music Television USA was a music video show which aired on Sundays. It was later replaced by The Beatbox, which was replaced in the mid-1990s by 2TV.

Other programming included Fortycoats & Co., a live-action series; Pat's Chat, an entertainment series with poet Pat Ingoldsby; Eureka, an Irish language quiz show for schools and MegaMix, a live music series for up and coming Irish bands.

=== 1990s ===
Many of the changes made in the late 1980s continued into the mid-1990s. Ian Dempsey left the role of host of Dempsey's Den and was replaced by Jo Maxi presenter Ray D'Arcy. Jo Maxi continued until the mid-1990s, when it was dropped in favour of Echo Island, a show aim at the pre-teen market.

RTÉ One continued to be the home of Saturday morning children's TV, with Scratch Saturday, which was eventually replaced by The Swamp in the mid-1990s. With this replacement, all children's programming moved to RTÉ2/Network2. The Swamp was much more like The Den, providing introductions to TV shows, unlike its interactive predecessors.

In early 1990, many pre-school programmes were added to morning TV on RTÉ One before moving fully to RTÉ2 in 1998, where Den2 began broadcasting from 09:00 until 17:30.

Sunday morning video request show The Beat Box was replaced by 2TV in the mid-1990s. 2TV had various spin off programmes, including a short lived daily pre-recorded morning show. Ireland's Top 30 Hits also began broadcasting in the 1990s.

Fish was a short-lived Friday night pop music programme, while T/X took over from The Swamp on Saturday mornings, bringing back interviews, competitions and music to Saturday mornings.

The Morbegs took over from Bosco in the mid-1990s.

Live-action series included the teen musical comedy Finbar's Class and the BBC co-production Custer's Last Stand-up.

Ray D'Arcy was quiz master on Blackboard Jungle, a secondary schools quiz show, until the end of the 1990s, when it was replaced by Gridlock, presented by Derek Mooney.

Towards the end of the 1990s, Echo Island was replaced by Stream.

=== 2000s ===
The two children's streams on RTÉ2 (The Den and Den Tots) were joined in 2001 by a similar series for the teen market called ID. Both The Den and Den Tots were made available as separate channels on digital cable, although these were purely simulcasts of the RTÉ2 schedule.

ID was renamed twice – it became TTV in the mid-2000s, and by the end of the 2000s it was known as Two Tube. It aired from 17:30 to 19:00 each week night, introducing teen programmes such as Sabrina the Teenage Witch, followed by The Simpsons and the Australian soap Home and Away.

During this time there were some attempts to replace the music video show 2TV, but eventually the idea was dropped. Sattitude, co-presented by Declan Wolfe and Shonagh Lyons, was the last RTÉ Saturday morning show along with The Disney Club (later called The Club).

RTÉ during this time had a number of successful animations commissioned from the independent sector.

RTÉ Junior Radio was launched as a stand alone radio station.

=== 2010s ===
At the beginning of the 2010s the under 6s strand of programming adopted the name of RTÉ children's radio station RTÉjr, while its over 6s strand became TRTÉ. Two Tube remained as their teen strand until 2016, when it was cancelled.

In 2011, RTÉjr was given its own channel, initially broadcasting Monday to Friday from 09:00 to 18:00 and later expanding to a seven-day week and starting at 07:00 and closing at 19:00.

In the early 2010s, Elev8 was an entertainment show aimed at the 6 to 10 age group, while Juice was aimed at the 10 to 14 year old age group.

TRTÉ was gradually scaled back in the late 2010s, its programming having a finish time of 17:30, with the addition of more teen/family programmes such as The Goldbergs, Shortland Street and Neighbours. RTÉ has pushed its end time back to 16:30 each afternoon.

Since the late 2010s, the TRTÉ brand is only used on a very small scale. It is used partially on social media, though often referred to as RTÉjr. On screen it is represented by idents and short films about the hobbies and interests of children from around the country. Promotionally, the programmes aimed at the over 6s use RTÉ2's branding.

By the end of the 2010s, children's content had been significantly reduced due to cutbacks.

== Programming ==
=== Television programmes ===
RTÉ Young People's Programming include:

English-language

- RTÉ KIDSjr
- RTÉ Kids
- News2day

Irish-language

- On TG4
- Bog Stop

== The team ==
Presenters	Puppets
Reuben	Bó
Emma	Ógie

=== Former presenters ===
- Ray D'Arcy
- Ian Dempsey
- Zig and Zag
- Dustin the Turkey
