= Anything Goes (Irish TV series) =

Irish TV series

- Opening credits
- Presented by: Mary FitzGerald; Dave Heffernan; Aonghus McAnally; Kathy Parke
- Country of origin: Ireland
- Original language: English
- No. of seasons: 6

Production
- Production company: Raidió Teilifís Éireann (RTÉ)

Original release
- Network: RTÉ One
- Release: 4 October 1980 – 1986

Related
- 2Phat, A Scare at Bedtime, Dustin's Daily News, Echo Island, Jo Maxi, The Den (Ireland), The Podge and Rodge Show

Anything Goes was a youth oriented television series of Ireland's public broadcaster Raidió Teilifís Éireann. It first aired on 4 October 1980 and was on the RTÉ1 channel. It lasted for six seasons and finished in 1986.

== Overview ==
The presenters of the show were Mary FitzGerald, Dave Heffernan, Aonghus McAnally, and Kathy Parke.

Anything Goes's audience was aimed at children and teenagers. The content of the programme included music, visits from public figures, competitions, filmed items, and cartoons. There was also coverage of news and current issues relevant to children.

A popular aspect of the series was an arts and crafts "Make and Do" segment where presenter Mary FitzGerald demonstrated simple cooking and crafts.

The interviewees who appeared on the show included Roald Dahl, David Attenborough, Bono, Adam Ant and Toyah Willcox.

== Musical acts ==
The bands that appeared on "Anything Goes" included: In Tua Nua, The Atrix, The Babysnakes, The Crack, Cruella De Ville, The End, Soon, G Squad, Tokyo Olympics, Driveshaft, Porcelyn Tears, The Sussed, The Stars of Heaven, and Montage.
