= 32 Counties (song) =

Single by Dustin the Turkey

from the album Poultry in Motion
- B-side: "Fields of Athenry"
- Released: 1999
- Recorded: 1999
- Genre: Novelty
- Length: 3:40
- Label: Lime Records, EMI

Dustin the Turkey singles chronology
| "Fairytale of New York" (1997) | "32 Counties" (1999) | "Christmas in Dublin" (1999) |

"32 Counties" is a 1999 novelty single by Irish puppet character Dustin the Turkey.

== Lyrics ==
The title features John Morrison, in character as Dustin the Turkey of The Den, singing a song about the 32 counties of Ireland and notable features and traditions found in each. Some counties are mentioned in a derogatory context, intended to be satirical/insulting; these are marked with (†) below.

| County | Feature |
|---|---|
| Antrim | Giant's Causeway |
| Armagh | Armagh Planetarium |
| Carlow | Carlow Courthouse |
| Cavan | "potholes the size of lakes" (†) |
| Clare | "The Banner flies" |
| Cork | Blarney Stone |
| Donegal | Fishing industry |
| Down | Mourne Mountains |
| Dublin | Dublin City |
| Fermanagh | Marble Arch Caves |
| Galway | "salty hills", a reference to Salthill |
| Kerry | Lakes of Killarney |
| Kildare | The Curragh |
| Kilkenny | Kilkenny cats |
| Laois | "Laois is a prison" (Portlaoise Prison, Midlands Prison) (†) |
| Leitrim | "Leitrim's a mistake" (†) |
| Limerick | "Limerick You're A Lady" |
| Londonderry (referred to as Derry) | Derry city walls |
| Longford | Longford Slashers |
| Louth | Oliver Plunkett's head (Drogheda) |
| Mayo | Croagh Patrick |
| Meath | Tara Brooch |
| Monaghan | "grey soil", a reference to a Patrick Kavanagh poem |
| Offaly | "Faithful Offaly" |
| Roscommon | Douglas Hyde |
| Sligo | William Butler Yeats |
| Tipperary | Rock of Cashel |
| Tyrone | Ulster American Folk Park |
| Waterford | Waterford Crystal |
| Westmeath | "Westmeath has a bypass" (N6 road) (†) |
| Wexford | Strawberry production |
| Wicklow | Gardens |

== Release ==
The single was sold to raise funds for the National Children's Hospital.

The song reached #1 in Ireland in November 1999.

Dave McEvoy wrote of it, "If you ask me, Dustin the Turkey should be our real cultural icon. He taught generations of kids what it meant to be Irish. Discredit authority, make fun of people from other counties, begrudge other people’s success, sing loudly even if you can’t and by no means praise anyone in government."

== See also ==
- List of number-one singles of 1999 (Ireland)
