= List of number-one singles of 1999 (Ireland) =

The following is a list of the IRMA's number-one singles of 1999. The dates shown are Sundays.

Issue date	Song	Artist	Ref.
3 January	"Chocolate Salty Balls"	Chef	
10 January	"Chocolate Salty Balls"	Chef	
17 January	"Chocolate Salty Balls"	Chef	
24 January	"Chocolate Salty Balls"	Chef	
31 January	"Pretty Fly (For a White Guy)"	The Offspring	
7 February	"Pretty Fly (For a White Guy)"	The Offspring	
14 February	"Pretty Fly (For a White Guy)"	The Offspring	
21 February	"...Baby One More Time"	Britney Spears	
28 February	"...Baby One More Time"	Britney Spears	
7 March	"...Baby One More Time"	Britney Spears	
14 March	"...Baby One More Time"	Britney Spears	
21 March	"...Baby One More Time"	Britney Spears	
28 March	"...Baby One More Time"	Britney Spears	
4 April	"Swear It Again"	Westlife	
11 April	"Swear It Again"	Westlife	
18 April	"Swear It Again"	Westlife	
25 April	"Swear It Again"	Westlife	
2 May	"Swear It Again"	Westlife	
9 May	"No Scrubs"	TLC	
16 May	"No Scrubs"	TLC	
23 May	"Candle for Kosovo"	Rain / Various Artists	
30 May	"Candle for Kosovo"	Rain / Various Artists	
6 June	"Everybody's Free (To Wear Sunscreen)"	Baz Luhrmann	
13 June	"Everybody's Free (To Wear Sunscreen)"	Baz Luhrmann	
20 June	"That Don't Impress Me Much"	Shania Twain	
27 June	"9pm (Till I Come)"	ATB	
4 July	"9pm (Till I Come)"	ATB	
11 July	"9pm (Till I Come)"	ATB	
18 July	"9pm (Till I Come)"	ATB	
25 July	"Livin' la Vida Loca"	Ricky Martin	
1 August	"When You Say Nothing at All"	Ronan Keating	
8 August	"When You Say Nothing at All"	Ronan Keating	
15 August	"If I Let You Go"	Westlife	
22 August	"If I Let You Go"	Westlife	
29 August	"Mambo No. 5"	Lou Bega	
5 September	"Mambo No. 5"	Lou Bega	
12 September	"Mambo No. 5"	Lou Bega	
19 September	"Blue (Da Ba Dee)"	Eiffel 65	
26 September	"Blue (Da Ba Dee)"	Eiffel 65	
3 October	"Blue (Da Ba Dee)"	Eiffel 65	
10 October	"Blue (Da Ba Dee)"	Eiffel 65	
17 October	"Blue (Da Ba Dee)"	Eiffel 65	
24 October	"Flying Without Wings"	Westlife	
31 October	"Flying Without Wings"	Westlife	
7 November	"Flying Without Wings"	Westlife	
14 November	"Flying Without Wings"	Westlife	
21 November	"32 Counties"	Dustin	
28 November	"32 Counties"	Dustin	
5 December	"Every Day I Love You"	Boyzone	
12 December	"I Try"	Macy Gray	
19 December	"I Have a Dream"/"Seasons In The Sun"	Westlife	
26 December	"I Have a Dream"/"Seasons In The Sun"	Westlife	

== See also ==
- 1999 in music
- List of artists who reached number one in Ireland
