= Vincent Hanley =

Irish radio DJ and television presenter

- Vincent Hanley presenting MT-USA from New York City in 1984, three years before his death.
- Born: 2 April 1954; Clonmel, South Tipperary, Ireland
- Died: 18 April 1987 (aged 33); Dublin, Ireland
- Cause of death: Cerebral toxoplasmosis resulting from AIDS
- Other name: Fab Vinny
- Occupations: Radio and television presenter
- Years active: 1976–1987
- Employer: RTÉ
- Known for: Radio presenting, MT-USA and his early death

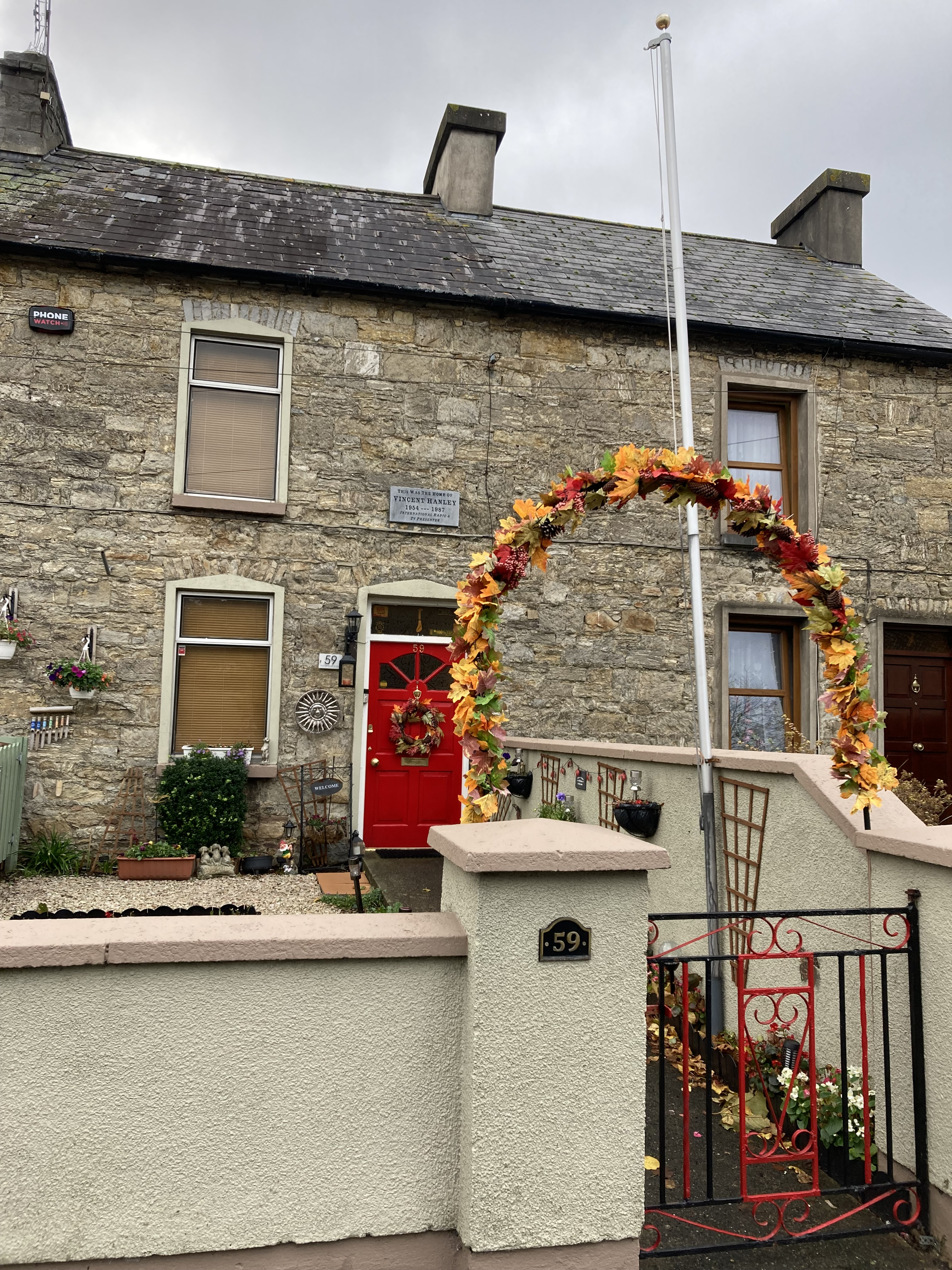
Hanley's family home on Kickham Street, Clonmel; a plaque in his memory was unveiled in 2013

Vincent Hanley (2 April 1954 – 18 April 1987) was an Irish radio DJ and television presenter, nicknamed "Fab Vinny". He worked mainly for Raidió Teilifís Éireann, and was the first Irish celebrity to die from an AIDS-related illness. He has been described as "Ireland's first gay celebrity".

Hanley began presenting pop music shows on RTÉ Radio Cork in 1976. He also did stints in Dublin on RTÉ Radio 1 and RTÉ television, including a special on Gilbert O'Sullivan. When the first dedicated pop station, RTÉ Radio Two (now branded 2FM), was started in 1979, he was one of its best-known DJs. While in Dublin he shared accommodation with Charles Self. In 1981, he moved to London to work for Capital Radio. In 1984, he declined a lucrative offer to remain there and moved to New York City.

Hanley founded Green Apple Productions in 1983 with Conor McAnally, an RTÉ television producer and son of actor Ray McAnally. The company produced MT-USA (Music Television USA), a three-hour-long music video show modelled on the new American cable channel, MTV. MT-USA was broadcast on RTÉ from 1984 to 1987 on Sunday afternoons. Each block of videos was followed by a segment filmed in New York City with Hanley introducing the videos, discussing American music and culture, and interviewing a celebrity. RTÉ described him as Europe's first VJ (video jockey).

In 1987, Hanley died shortly after his 33rd birthday. He had been visibly ill for some time, and was rumoured to have an AIDS-related illness, which he denied. This reflected the stigma then associated with the disease and with homosexuality in Ireland, which was not decriminalised until 1993. The illness admitted by Hanley was congenital cerebral toxoplasmosis, described as an "eye disorder"; he was blind in one eye by his death. Toxoplasmosis is very rarely fatal in adults who do not have a weakened immune system. In 2000, Hanley's friend and colleague Bill Hughes, who had himself come out in the 1990s, agreed that Hanley had in fact died of an AIDS-related illness. The same year, the Sunday Tribune newspaper placed Hanley at the top of a list of Irish gay icons.

In February 2022, RTÉ aired a new documentary about Hanley, titled Vincent Hanley: Sex, Lies and Videotapes.
