= 32 Counties =

32 Counties may refer to:

- The traditional 32 counties of Ireland – politically, the term is mostly used by groups seeking a Unification of Ireland
- "32 Counties" (song), by Dustin the Turkey
- 32 County Sovereignty Movement
