= The Once a Week Show =

- Also known as: The Once a Week Show with Dustin and Sinéad from Sinéad's House Where Dustin Likes to Hang
- Genre: Talk / comedy
- Starring: Dustin the Turkey
- Country of origin: Ireland
- Original language: English

Original release
- Network: RTÉ Two
- Release: 8 September 2007 – 26 April 2008

Related
- Dustin's Daily News

The Once a Week Show with Dustin and Sinéad from Sinéad's House Where Dustin Likes to Hang is a television chat/comedy show, broadcast on RTÉ Two in 2007 and 2008. A successor to the more frequently aired Dustin's Daily News, it was presented by Dustin the Turkey of The Den, with his assistant Sinéad Ni Churnain as a co-presenter. More or less exactly the same as the previous show, only with a studio instead of a newsroom, plus the reduced daily to weekly frequency of the show. During the show's run the presenter was selected to represent Ireland at Eurovision Song Contest 2008.

== Episodes ==
No.	Original release date	Guest(s)	Musical/entertainment guest(s)
1	8 September 2007	Ray Houghton, Sarah Morrissey	Paddy Casey
2	15 September 2007	Marty Morrissey, Dave Coffey	Royseven ("You Can't Hide That")
3	22 September 2007	Katy French, Brian Ormond, Pamela Flood	Ham Sandwich
4	29 September 2007	Joe O'Shea, Michelle Heaton	Crayonsmith
5	6 October 2007	Brian Dowling, David Mitchell and Doireann Ni Chorragáin	The Kinetiks
6	13 October 2007	Bláthnaid Ní Chofaigh, Blathnaid O' Donoghue	The Frank and Walters ("City Lights")
7	20 October 2007	Joe Duffy, Aidan Bishop	Zing
8	27 October 2007	Caroline Morahan, Shane O'Donoghue	Giveamanakick ("Spring Break")
9	3 November 2007	Keith Duffy, Will Leahy	Niall Connolly ("The Future Tense")
10	10 November 2007	Anna Nolan, Andrew Stanley and Damien Clark	Fight Like Apes ("Do You Karate?")
11	17 November 2007	Jimmy Magee, Síle Seoige	Hooray For Humans
12	24 November 2007	Lorraine Keane, Oliver Callan	Dark Room ShortSummary ("Shake Shake My Ceiling")
13	1 December 2007	Dáithí Ó Sé, Laura Woods	Nizlopi
14	8 December 2007	Jason Byrne, Jason McAteer	The Mighty Stef ("Golden Glove")
15	15 December 2007	Bernard Dunne, Bryan Dobson	Mark O'Connor
16	12 January 2008	Louis Walsh, Ruth Gilligan, Glenda Gilson	The Laundry Shop
17	14 January 2008	Marty Whelan and Amy O'Sullivan, Martin King	We Should Be Dead ("Forget Romance, Let's Dance")
18	19 January 2008	Dermot Whelan, Tom Dunne	Pamela Connolly
19	1 February 2008	George Hook, Duncan and Tania Stewart	Stanley Super 800
20	2 February 2008	Bláthnaid McKenna, Aoife Nic Ardghail and Alana Henderson	Stagger Lee ("Bad Shoes")
21	9 February 2008	Nuala Carey, Billy and Christy from Aslan	Aslan ("Sooner or Later")
22	16 February 2008	Kathryn Thomas, Patrick Kielty	Grand Pocket Orchestra ("Odd Socks")
23	23 February 2008	Nicky Byrne from Westlife, Killian O'Sullivan	The Infomatics ("Wake Up")
Rosanna Davison guest co-hosted with Dustin, as Sinéad is said to be in Limerick preparing the stage for Dustin's Eurosong performance that night.
24	1 March 2008	Ken Doherty, Karl Spain	Jaded Sun ("Can't Stop")
Dermot Whelan guest co-hosted with Sinéad, as Dustin is said to be on a cruise to celebrate his Eurosong win.
25	8 March 2008	Craig Doyle	Television Room ("Modern Boys and Girls")
Also featured a section dedicated to the presenter's Eurosong win.
26	15 March 2008	Mícheál Ó Muircheartaigh, Siún Nic Gearailt	Kíla ("Cardinal Knowledge" feat. Mícheál Ó Muircheartaigh)
27	22 March 2008	Karen Koster, Jenny Huston	Boss Volenti
28	29 March 2008	Leanne Moore, Pamela Flood	Dirty Epics ("The Cure")
29	5 April 2008	Diarmuid Gavin, Robert Sheehan	Republic of Loose ("I Like Music")
30	12 April 2008	Holly White and George McMahon, Gráinne Seoige	Exit: Pursued By a Bear ("No Transcending")
31	19 April 2008	Ray D'Arcy, Aoibhinn Ní Shúilleabháin and Bazil Ashmawy	Gary Dunne (a song from the album Simple Truth)
32	26 April 2008	Alan Hughes, Rosanna Davison, Bosco	Wallis Bird ("Counting to Sleep")
