= Mtusa =

Mtusa may refer to:

- Miss Teen USA
- MT-USA, a 1980s music TV series from Ireland
