= The Wee Littles =

- Genre: Animation

Production
- Producer: Christina O'Shea

Original release
- Network: RTEjr (Ireland); S4C (Wales)
- Release: 3 September 2022

The Wee Littles is a 2022 Irish animated television series by Magpie 6 Media.
