= Conor McAnally =

Irish television writer, producer, and director

Conor McAnally (born 24 March 1952) is an Irish television writer, producer and director. He worked in Ireland up to 1989, moved to London and worked in the United Kingdom until 2004 when he moved to the United States. He is based in Austin, Texas. His productions have won more than 20 awards including five British Academy Awards and three from the Royal Television Society. He is best known for music and entertainment programmes and is an expert in live broadcasts.

== Early life ==
McAnally was born in Dublin, Ireland to actors Ray McAnally and Ronnie Masterson. He is the eldest of four children. His brother Aonghus is a radio and television presenter and producer at the Irish broadcast service, RTÉ. He was educated at St. Josephs's Primary and Secondary Schools in Fairview, Dublin, and then attended Rathmines College of Commerce Dublin Institute of Technology where he graduated in Journalism.

== Career ==
McAnally joined Independent Newspapers in Dublin in 1970 as a junior reporter and worked for the daily Irish Independent, Evening Herald, and the weekly Sunday Independent. During a five-year newspaper career he was an investigative reporter, crime reporter, health and social welfare correspondent, deputy motoring correspondent, and a columnist. He won the Journalist of the Year award in 1972 for breaking a story on how the Irish Republican Army was training volunteers to fight in Northern Ireland. He met his first wife Roisin Finnigan at the Independent, where she worked as a copy taker.

In 1975, McAnally joined RTÉ as a radio and television reporter. He worked in the newsroom for two years before moving into programme presenting on The Politics Programme and Youngline. As the host of Youngline, he was the first person to introduce the fledgling music group U2 to a television audience. In 1980, McAnally became RTÉ's youngest producer/director. He produced Ireland's Eye, Non Stop Pop, Moving Hearts in Concert, Stockton's Wing in Concert, Christmas at the Castle, and directed a number of other shows.

In 1982, he left to form Spearhead Productions and directed 152 shows in his first year. In 1984, McAnally joined forces with radio DJ Vincent Hanley ("Fab Vinny") to form Green Apple Productions, where they created MT USA, Europe's first terrestrial music video television series, and Hanley became Ireland's first VJ. The show was broadcast on Sunday afternoons, repeated on Friday nights, and continued until 1987, when Hanley died of an AIDS-related illness. McAnally and the other Green Apple partner Bill Hughes decided to end the programme series rather than continue without Hanley. Shows at Green Apple included Rapid Roulette, Finding Fax Future, and The Write Stuff. In 1987 and 1988 he made a trilogy of documentaries on AIDS. He later described them as a tribute to his friend and partner Vincent Hanley.

In 1987, Green Apple Productions merged with Strongbow Film and Television Productions, a producer of documentaries, feature films, and television dramas. McAnally left Strongbow in 1989 and moved to London, where he freelanced as a producer and director. He worked with The Children's Channel, directing 12 shows a week for their British Satellite Broadcasting channel. He joined Buena Vista Productions (Disney) in London and produced The Disney Club for ITV for three seasons. After Disney, he developed, wrote, produced and directed Over The Wall at Brian Waddell Productions for the BBC. The executive producer of Over The Wall, Peter Murphy, introduced him to British pop duo Ant & Dec, and he became their producer for The Ant & Dec Show at the BBC, Ant & Dec Unzipped at Channel 4, SM:TV Live and CD:UK at ITV. He headed Blaze Television at Zenith Entertainment Ltd.

In 2004, McAnally moved his home to Texas and commuted to London. In 2005, DIRECTV in Los Angeles commissioned CD:USA, a music show based on the CD:UK format. McAnally moved to Los Angeles to run the show, and a year later, Blaze was sold to US media company Shout! Factory, at which point McAnally became managing director of the company until the end of 2009.

McAnally created ConorMac Productions in 2010. The company is based in Bastrop, Texas, just outside Austin, and specialises in multi-camera directing and producing music, entertainment and other genres.
