= Raymond Keane (Irish actor) =

Irish actor, theatre producer and puppeteer

Raymond Keane is an Irish actor, clown, puppeteer and theatre writer and producer, known for founding the Barabbas Theatre Company in Temple Bar, Dublin.

Keane was the voice of the puppet Pajo, from RTÉ One's Pajo's Junkbox, a children's TV show, also starring Rosemary Henderson. Keane, as Pajo, topped the Irish charts with "Let's Wash our Socks for Christmas" novelty record, returning to the charts in December 2014, as part of The Zog Chorus, a group of puppets from RTÉ Young People's Programming from the 80's and 90's, Zig and Zag, Bosco, and Dustin the Turkey, recording a charity single in aid of Childline. In 1999 Keane portrayed a dying character on soap opera Fair City, In 2014, Keane performed a series of Samuel Beckett plays in 14 Henrietta Street, having performed site-specific performances of the playwright's work across Dublin city in 2009.

In 2007, he produced Circus, inspired by Fellini's La Strada, in the Project Arts Centre with Barabbas.

In 2021 Keane was nominated along with Sarah Jane Scaife as Irish Theatre Awards Best Director for The Long Christmas Dinner, in the Abbey Theatre.

In 2024, Keane directed a cast of actors with disabilities in Christian O'Reilly's No Magic Pill for Magic Pill. In 2025, he played a masked character in Brú Theatre's production of Not a Word at the Barbican in London as part of MimeLondon.

Keane is an adjunct professor at Trinity College Dublin's School for the Creative Arts, and a clown specialist at the Gaiety School of Acting.
