= List of The Den programmes =

This is a list of television programmes which were broadcast on the children's television strand The Den of RTÉ in the Republic of Ireland from 1986 until its conclusion.

== Creature Feature ==
Éanna ni Lamhna presented Creature Feature. It had a nature theme.

== Draw with Don ==
Each week Don Conroy would arrive at the studio to draw a picture (often of his beloved owls) or read from one of his children's books. The Den presenter, on his own sketchpad, would typically try to mimic Don's style; he would inevitably fail to match Don. Towards the end, Don would show the viewers a selection of drawings sent to him over the course of that week.

== Echo Island ==
Echo Island —a "children's magazine" show along the lines of Blue Peter—first aired in 1994. It ran three days a week for the first season, adding an extra programme at the start of the second season in September 1995, with two in English and the other two as Gaeilge. It was renamed Echo in 1999 (for its final season). Original hosts were Derek Mooney and Bláthnaid Ní Chofaigh. Comedian Dara Ó Briain, who has since become recognisable abroad, spent most of his RTÉ career on Echo Island from 1995 onwards. Carrie Crowley joined the show in 1996, later achieving global recognition by presenting Eurovision Song Contest 1997.

== FISH ==
FISH, seen here in 1999. The Den2 DOG tag can also be seen.

An acronym for Friday It Starts Here, this was a weekly show presented by Danann Breathnach and Louise Loughman during the Den2 era.

== The Grip ==
Ryle Nugent presented this sports programme from 1994 until 1998.

== Happy Birthday ==
Every day (even on Christmas Day), photographs of children would roll along the screen commemorating their birthdays, after which a music video would be shown.

== Pop Gossip ==
Simon Young, a former disc jockey with RTÉ 2fm, would present a weekly popular music news chat with Dempsey and D'Arcy. Emma Ledden succeeded Young in the mid-1990s; from there she transferred to MTV Europe in the late 1990s.

== Stream ==
Five of these aired, each on a different day of the week.

- Mondays had Quiz Stream.
  - In Quiz Stream, two teams of three boys or three girls faced each other. The first to answer six questions correctly (spelling out S-T-R-E-A-M in lights before them) won.
- Tuesdays had Pet Stream and, later, Style Stream
- Wednesdays had Cyber Stream.
- Star Stream would presumably therefore have been on Thursdays.
- Fridays had Sports Stream.

== The Works ==
Mary Kingston presented The Works on Wednesdays between 17:00 and 17:30 (just before Spider-Man).

== The Yes-No Game Show ==
The Yes-No Game Show

The Yes-No Game Show ran from roughly 1995 to 1998 and happened twice a week, on Tuesday and Thursday afternoons. Two children would partake in this, seated behind a desk upon which lay a selection of their favourite soft toys, which would be introduced in advance. The children would attempt to answer questions on themselves without the use of "Yes" or "No". If they lasted a desirable length, many prizes would be bestowed upon them, including the coveted Yes-No Game Show winners' mug. If they stumbled into a "Yes" or a "No" they received all the prizes anyway, apart from the mug. This was later part of Dustin's Daily News, running for a few weeks at a time before a break.

Various successor quizzes featured on The Den, including The Furry Green Telly Quiz and The Furry Blue Telly Quiz. When the Furry Green Telly Quiz "stopped", there was a running gag that Dustin was working on a new quiz which promised to be bigger and better. This new quiz was kept under wraps and hidden under a blanket at the back of the studio. Finally, after much anticipation, Dustin proudly unveiled the new game... The Furry Blue Telly Quiz. There was also The Big Bus Quiz. During the Den2 era there were also holiday-themed "challenges" (e.g. a Pumpkin Challenge at Halloween, a Mince Pie Challenge at Christmas, an Easter Egg Challenge at Easter). Viewers would telephone in and pick from a selection of the eponymous challenges, laid out and numbered on the desk in front of Damo, to reveal a prize.

== Imported programming ==
- Ace Ventura: Pet Detective
- The Adventures of Jimmy Neutron, Boy Genius
- The Adventures of Paddington Bear
- The Adventures of Rocky and Bullwinkle
- Adventures on Kythera
- The All-New Popeye Show
- Alvin and the Chipmunks
- The Angry Beavers
- The Animals of Farthing Wood
- Animaniacs
- Anthony Ant
- Around the World with Willy Fogg
- Babar
- Baby Follies (dubbed into Irish with the title Tír na hÓige, later aired on TG4)
- Back to the Future
- Bananas in Pyjamas
- Barney and Friends
- Batman: The Animated Series and Batman Beyond
- The Beachcombers
- Bear in the Big Blue House
- Bernard's Watch
- Biker Mice from Mars
- Bob the Builder
- Bouli
- Braceface
- Bump in the Night
- Buzz Lightyear of Star Command
- Caillou
- Captain Planet
- Cardcaptor Sakura
- Cardcaptors
- Care Bears
- CatDog
- Cockleshell Bay
- Count Duckula
- Darkwing Duck
- Dastardly and Muttley
- Dennis the Menace and Gnasher (1996 series)
- Dexter's Laboratory
- Digimon
- Dogtanian and the Three Muskehounds
- Doug
- Dream Street
- The Dreamstone
- Ed, Edd n Eddy
- Edward and Friends
- The Elephant Show
- Fantastic Four (1978 series)
- Fireman Sam
- The Flintstones
- Franklin
- The Fruitties
- George Shrinks
- The Real Ghostbusters
- Harry and His Bucket Full of Dinosaurs
- He-Man and the Masters of the Universe
- The Henderson Kids
- Hey Arnold!
- Histeria!
- Hokey Wolf
- The Hot Rod Dogs and Cool Car Cats
- The Huckleberry Hound Show
- Hurricanes
- Inspector Gadget
- Into the Labyrinth
- Iznogoud
- James Bond Jr.
- The Jetsons
- Jim Henson's Animal Show
- Johnny Bravo
- Jumanji
- Kenan & Kel
- Kipper
- The Legend of the Hidden City
- Little Bear
- Looney Tunes and Merrie Melodies
- Maggie and the Ferocious Beast
- Magic Adventures of Mumfie
- The Magic School Bus
- Maisy
- The Mask: Animated Series
- Medabots
- Mega Man
- Microsoap
- Mighty Max
- Moomin (1990 series)
- Mopatop's Shop
- Mowgli: The New Adventures of the Jungle Book
- Mr. Men and Little Miss
- The New Woody Woodpecker Show
- Noah's Island
- Oakie Doke
- Pelswick
- The Pink Panther Show
- Pinky and the Brain
- Pippi Longstocking
- Pocket Dragon Adventures
- Pokémon; Indigo League
- Potamus Park
- Power Rangers Lost Galaxy
- Princess Sissi
- A Pup Named Scooby-Doo
- The Raccoons
- The Real Adventures of Jonny Quest
- Renford Rejects
- Roger and the Rottentrolls
- Rolie Polie Olie
- Rotten Ralph
- Round the Twist
- Rugrats
- Saber Rider and the Star Sheriffs
- Sabrina, the Teenage Witch
- Sandokan
- Saved by the Bell
- Sesame Street
- Shaun the Sheep
- She-Ra: Princess of Power
- Sheeep
- Shinzo
- Sidekicks
- The Silver Brumby
- SilverHawks
- Sister, Sister
- Skippy the Bush Kangaroo
- The Smurfs
- Stingray
- Superman
- Superman: The Animated Series
- SuperTed
- Taz-Mania
- Teenage Mutant Hero Turtles (1987 series)
- Thomas & Friends
- Thundercats
- The Tick
- Timbuctoo
- Tiny Toon Adventures
- Titch
- Tom and Jerry Kids
- Toonimals!
- The Toothbrush Family
- Tots TV
- Touché Turtle and Dum Dum
- Tugs
- The Wild Thornberrys
- William's Wish Wellingtons
- The Wind in the Willows
- The Wiggles
- Wisdom of the Gnomes
- Wishbone
- Woof!
- The World of Peter Rabbit and Friends
- The Worst Witch
- X-Men
- Yoho Ahoy
- Yu-Gi-Oh!
- Yu-Gi-Oh! GX

== Summer ==
Initially, The Den broke for the summer months, returning when children went back to school in September. From 1996 to 1997, The Swamp replaced The Den as a weekday strand during the summer. Mossy Ferguson, Rory and Rasher Bacon presented The Swamp. The Swamp took place in a chip-van and later a shop. The cast were involved in plots, such as saving Rasher from an eagle and getting rid of a vampire. Skelly, a talking skeleton, made several guest appearances on the show. In 1997–1998, The Swamp was aired on Saturdays and Sundays, while The Den was broadcast on weekdays. Although The Swamp proved a successful venture, RTÉ cancelled it in May 1998, much to the disappointment of its fans.

In its latter years, The Den remained on air during the summer. However, there were often either replacement presenters (Aidan Power and a girl called Aoileann, for example) and/or weeks when there was no live presentation.

Another earlier summer replacement for The Den aired for one summer between 26 June and 1 September 1995. This was Jump Around, presented by Joe Rooney with the assistance of Agnes Detortois.

== Morning ==
Initially, The Den aired only in the afternoons. Then came Soky's Big Little Morning Show, with Soky and Geri Maye.

== TV specials ==
=== Christmas ===
The Christmas period was noted for having two specials, one bizarrely overdramatic one on Christmas Eve and another slightly more realistic and rational one on Christmas Day. The Den was the only TV programme (besides the news) to be broadcast live around Ireland on Christmas Day.

During December, The Den would go off air for a few days, during which the Christmas special (to be broadcast on Christmas Eve) would be filmed. This almost always involved a trip to Lapland and an improbable but amusing plot in which the cast had to somehow save Christmas, often having to rescue Santa Claus from some perilous event. Children with serious illnesses would often accompany the cast, as an extension of their Make a Wish programme. The elves would be shown at work as they prepared for the events of Christmas Eve and Socky might feed carrots to the reindeer. In the earlier days, RTÉ newsreader Vere Wynne-Jones would often be given a cameo role reading a newsflash concerning Zig and Zag (Zig was given one last chance by Santa to be good one year, or Christmas would be cancelled), or the mysterious disappearance of Santa Claus.

The Christmas special would be given a prime time slot on RTÉ 1. One such Christmas programme managed to coincide with one of the most important events of the twentieth century. In December 1991, The Den crew went to Moscow to film their special, which was perfectly calm, as one would expect for a children's Christmas special. By Christmas Day, as The Den was being shown, the Soviet Union had just conveniently collapsed into chaos, with its remaining contingent states declaring independence. On another occasion the evil Podge (now a reformed individual with a background as a highly successful talk show co-host) tried to thwart Santa and jeopardise Christmas by locking him inside a large wooden cabinet in his own house. Ray D'Arcy and others from the cast very conveniently happened upon the scene just as time was running out and Santa availed of their presence to scuttle off to his workshops to save Christmas. On another occasion the problem was a depressed Rudolph, whose nose had lost its legendary shine, thus giving Santa the difficulty of having no method of finding his way through the night sky.

A memorable Christmas under presenter Damien McCaul had him, Socky and Dustin travel to New York in search of a Mr. Micro Blue Bucket with Removable Arms, a present that Socky desired but which would not be available in Ireland until the following March. After persistently demanding that Socky be granted this gift and searching through the internet, overcoming Derek Davis's diet tips and Pat Kenny's guide on how to be "an insufferable bore" along the way, Dustin discovered that 100 Mr. Micro Blue Bucket action figures would be delivered to F.A.O. Swarz, the largest toy store in the world located in Manhattan, New York, on Christmas Eve (the following morning). He then persuaded Damien to bring himself and Socky there instead of surrendering to Damien's preferred option of buying LEGO for Socky. Despite Damian explaining that there was no way they could fly to New York with so little time left, they were soon inside F.A.O. Swarz. The naive but kind-hearted Socky was exuberant, as Dustin pointed out Laa-Laa the Teletubby, and wanted to find presents for his Mammy (Geri Maye), his best friend (Thomas), and "all the boys and girls in playschool". Despite Socky being a preschooler, Damian and Dustin allowed him to wander off in the busy store, whilst they went in search of Mr. Micro Blue Bucket, with Dustin mistaking a Furby for Anne Doyle along the way.

Each Christmas Day, The Den would traditionally start at around 06:00 and continue until 13:00. Christmas-themed cartoons would be shown and the cast would talk about the toys they had received from Santa, whom they would have usually only just have saved from some terrible danger on the previous day. The first hour of this, it was later revealed, would be recorded and the rest would go out live.

=== The Den is Ten ===
This aired between 4 and 6 one afternoon in 1996, commemorating ten years of The Den. Presented by Ray D'Arcy (who tripped over Dustin's toolbox upon entering the not-quite completed studio), this aired in front of a live studio audience, which featured third and fourth class children from Carrickallen National School in County Cavan, as the postal address described it. But, as it turned out, D'Arcy breaking it gently to Dustin live on the air, that the school was on the border between County Cavan and County Leitrim. Renowned Leitrimophobe Dustin was unimpressed. Ian Dempsey was the first guest; he re-enacted the first day of Dempsey's Den, indicating the unavailability of the original tape. Then Bosco appeared, only to be whisked away upon the arrival of Zig and Zag. Other guests included Stephen Gately, Simon Young, a boy called Patrick Egdop, The Saw Doctors (described by D'Arcy as the band to have appeared most often on The Den) and Don Conroy. Towards the end Ciara Carroll was brought on and D'Arcy was forced to kiss her; Ian Dempsey was on hand to escort the startled assistant from the studio when the kiss was complete. The broadcast concluded with the cast and guests singing "Happy birthday" to The Den, balloons cascading into the studio from the ceiling and children running on to play.

=== Best Bitz from Back Den ===
The television special and DVD Best Bitz From Back Den returned to Zig and Zag's origins on The Den. Broadcast on RTÉ One on 27 October 2008 at 18:30, it was compiled to celebrate the 21st anniversary of the birth of Zig and Zag and later released as a DVD in November 2008. Presenters D'Arcy and Dempsey featured heavily in the special; other highlights included assaults perpetrated by Ted—a malicious panda—on the presenters, Christmas specials of The Den, footage of characters like Captain Joke, Captain Pillowcase and Cousin Nigel and Ireland's 1989 Irish Film and Television awards at which Zig and Zag "accidentally" mistook then taoiseach Albert Reynolds as actor Burt Reynolds and addressed him as "your majesty".

=== Dustin: 20 Years a Pluckin ===
The television special and DVD Dustin: 20 Years a Pluckin' was released in November 2009. Broadcast on RTÉ One on 8 November 2009 at 18:30, it was compiled to celebrate the 20th anniversary of Dustin's birth.
