= Dustin's Daily News =

- Genre: Talk / comedy
- Starring: Dustin the Turkey
- Country of origin: Ireland
- Original language: English

Original release
- Network: RTÉ Two
- Release: 19 September 2005 – 26 April 2007

Related
- The Once a Week Show

Dustin's Daily News (DDN) is a television chat/comedy show, broadcast on RTÉ Two. A predecessor of The Once a Week Show, it served as a new home for Dustin the Turkey, who had until then been part of The Den. Dustin co-presented with an assistant, Sinéad Ni Churnain. Two series were produced. The first series aired between 19 September 2005 and 29 April 2006, while the second series aired between September 2006 and April 2007.

Dustin's Daily News took place in the Dublin Mountains, where Dustin established his own network news channel. While Dustin would always be able to avoid being captured by a butcher in the opening sequence, he had another villain to contend with during the run of the show. The infamous Martin Duck planned a takeover of Dustin's news channel, but gardaí foiled him.

== Episodes ==
=== Series one ===
Episodes dating from January 2006 are available online.

==== January 2006 ====
Date	Main feature	Notes	Ref
16 January 2006	Sinead McGovern	Introduction of the "Turkey Gobble" game	
17 January 2006	Young Scientist 2006		
18 January 2006	Michael Carroll		
19 January 2006	Aunty Monica		
20 January 2006	Zoo		
23 January 2006	The Ups		
24 January 2006	Sideways Bike		
25 January 2006	Intercontinental football		
26 January 2006	turkeywings.com		
27 January 2006	Nick Costello		
30 January 2006	Leman		
31 January 2006	Bobsleigh team		

==== February 2006 ====
Date	Main feature	Notes	Ref
1 February 2006	Ruth-Anne Cunningham		
2 February 2006	Eoin McLoghlin		
3 February 2006	Song writing duo		
6 February 2006	Nickel and Dime		
7 February 2006	Young Citizens		
8 February 2006	Celtic Roots		
9 February 2006	Spelling Bees		
10 February 2006	Mr. BNG		
13 February 2006	Ciara McGin		
14 February 2006	Bertie Ahern		
15 February 2006	Annie		
16 February 2006	Arsenal football player		
17 February 2006	Dale Treadwell		
20 February 2006	Lousie Killeen		
21 February 2006	The Chakras		
22 February 2006	Actors from Honk		
23 February 2006	Nicole McAleer		
24 February 2006	Sinead and Sorcha Prendville		
27 February 2006	100 Show		
28 February 2006	Tug of War Champs		

==== March 2006 ====
Date	Main feature	Notes	Ref
1 March 2006	Samba Soccer		
2 March 2006	Oisín McGann		
6 March 2006	Lucia Evans		
7 March 2006	Fiddler on the Roof		
8 March 2006	Dean McCarthy		
9 March 2006	Bakers Leanne and Luke		
10 March 2006	Domhnall Ryan	The Junior Mastermind champion for 2006	
13 March 2006	Minister for Educat		
14 March 2006	Peter and the Starcatchers		
15 March 2006	Texting in Irish		
16 March 2006	Watersports		
20 March 2006	Karting Champ		
21 March 2006	Irish dancers		
22 March 2006	Young Scientist Olympics		
22 March 2006	Young Scientist Olympics		
23 March 2006	Carberry Jockeys		
24 March 2006	Donna and Joseph McCaul		
27 March 2006	Harry Potter and Batman		
28 March 2006	Jason Cullen		
29 March 2006	American footballers		
30 March 2006	Hip hop		
31 March 2006	Emma O'Driscoll		

==== April 2006 ====
Date	Main feature	Notes	Ref
3 April 2006	Ross Munnelly		
4 April 2006	Gymnasts Hannah and Michelle		
5 April 2006	Chris Doran		
7 April 2006	Rugby player Jonathon Sexton / Aerobatic pilot Eddie Goggins		
10 April 2006	Robbie Dowling		
11 April 2006	The Dooleys		
12 April 2006	Canoeist Jenny Egan		
14 April 2006	Unsung Heroes Mayor Catherine Byrne and Sinead Kelly		
18 April 2006	Golfer Brian Keenan		
19 April 2006	John Mahon		
20 April 2006	Kezi Silverstone		
21 April 2006	Scouts Christopher and Kevin		
24 April 2006	Sumo Wrestle Challenger		
25 April 2006	DSPCA's Robbie Kenny		
26 April 2006	Circus Ringmaster		
27 April 2006	Liam McCormack		
28 April 2006	Last show of the series		

=== Series two ===
==== September 2006 ====
Date	Main feature	Notes	Ref
4 September 2006	Bog Snorkelling Champ		
5 September 2006	Strongest Man in Ireland		
6 September 2006	JAM		
7 September 2006	Fair City's Oisín		
8 September 2006	Author Judy May		
11 September 2006	New Roving Reporter		
13 September 2006	Alana Brennan		
14 September 2006	Mícheál Ó Muircheartaigh		
15 September 2006	Wander Woman		
18 September 2006	Tin Whistle Man		
20 September 2006	Darren Shan		
21 September 2006	Monica Loughman		
22 September 2006	Golfing Champs		
25 September 2006	Evelyn Cusack		
27 September 2006	David Donoghue		
28 September 2006	Camogie Final		
29 September 2006	The Sullivan Brothers		

==== October 2006 ====
Date	Main feature	Notes	Ref
2 October 2006	Fireman Joe		
4 October 2006	Gamesmaster Jamie		
5 October 2006	Aoife Mullholland		
6 October 2006	Blue Cross		
9 October 2006	Gary Cunninham		
11 October 2006	Marita Conlon McKenna		
12 October 2006	Bodhrán champ		
13 October 2006	Friday 13		
16 October 2006	Heather Boyle		
18 October 2006	Aisling Judge		
19 October 2006	David Mitchell		
20 October 2006	Oisín McGann		
23 October 2006	Marilyn Bane		
25 October 2006	Witches		
26 October 2006	Eddie Lenihan		
27 October 2006	Ray D'Arcy		

==== November 2006 ====
Date	Main feature	Notes	Ref
1 November 2006	Culchie King		
2 November 2006	Shane Mullarkey		
3 November 2006	Dale Treadwell		
6 November 2006	Kathryn Feeney		
8 November 2006	Sleeping Beauty		
9 November 2006	Traolach		
10 November 2006	Sumo Wrestler		
13 November 2006	George Hamilton		
15 November 2006	Papa Bear		
16 November 2006	Keith Duffy		
17 November 2006	Ice Skater Nadia		
20 November 2006	Alan Healy		
-	DDN Celebrates 200 Shows		
23 November 2006	June Rogers		
24 November 2006	Seatbelt Sheriff		
27 November 2006	Bosco		
29 November 2006	Kasper the dog		
30 November 2006	Katie Lawlor		

==== December 2006 ====
Date	Main feature	Notes	Ref
1 December 2006	George McMahon		
4 December 2006	Aladdin		
5 December 2006	Louis Copeland		
7 December 2006	Louis Lovett		
8 December 2006	Jane Shortall		
11 December 2006	Edward The Clown		
13 December 2006	Gary Thompson		
14 December 2006	Gordon D'Arcy		
15 December 2006	Tiggy and Kelly		
18 December 2006	Ré O Laighléis		
20 December 2006	On The Block		
21 December 2006	Turkey Plucker		

==== January 2007 ====
Date	Main feature	Notes	Ref
15 January 2007	Wrestler Kid Kash		
17 January 2007	Ray Shah		
18 January 2007	Professor Blunderpants		
19 January 2007	Abdusalam Abubakar		
22 January 2007	Andrew Grafton		
-	Jason Sherlock		
25 January 2007	Beak Brother		
26 January 2007	Greg Ryan		
29 January 2007	Shayne Ward		
31 January 2007	Joanne Cuddihy		

==== February 2007 ====
Date	Main feature	Notes	Ref
1 February 2007	Lil' Chris		
2 February 2007	Alannah Scully		
5 February 2007	Richie McCoy		
7 February 2007	Photographers Daragh and Vanessa		
8 February 2007	Mista BNG		
9 February 2007	Fair City actor, Ryan		
12 February 2007	Ryle Nugent		
15 February 2007	Dustin's Deadly Busswords		
16 February 2007	Skatter Conor Manweiler		
19 February 2007	Andy Bennett		
21 February 2007	Artist Jenny Ring		
22 February 2007	Racer Emmet O'Brien		
23 February 2007	Director		
26 February 2007	Brian Clarke		
27 February 2007	Skaters Ciaran and Mark		
28 February 2007	Dewey from Malcolm in the Middle		

==== March 2007 ====
Date	Main feature	Notes	Ref
1 March 2007	Karl Fleming		
2 March 2007	The Big Fight		
5 March 2007	Alan Kavanagh		
6 March 2007	Paul Byrom		
7 March 2007	Joe O'Brien		
8 March 2007	Sinéad and Déaglán		
9 March 2007	Pamela Connolly		
12 March 2007	Scuba Dice		
14 March 2007	Raj Khan		
15 March 2007	Kíla		
16 March 2007	Dustin's Saint Patrick's Day Parade		
22 March 2007	Bonnie the dog		
23 March 2007	David O'Connor		
26 March 2007	21 Demands		
28 March 2007	Pat Dolan and Kevin Doyle		
29 March 2007	Derek Landy		
30 March 2007	Bunnies and pop music		

==== April 2007 ====
Date	Main feature	Notes	Ref
2 April 2007	Rosanna Davison		
4 April 2007	Hip Hop dancers		
5 April 2007	John Boyne		
6 April 2007	Martin Duck		
11 April 2007	The Whites		
12 April 2007	Martin Duck exclusive		
13 April 2007	Martin Duck		
16 April 2007	Rosanna Davison		
18 April 2007	Nadia Elatrash		
19 April 2007	Icecapades		
20 April 2007	Emma O'Driscoll and Brian Ormond		
23 April 2007	Stephen Garrigan: 21 Demands		
24 April 2007	Jon Kelly		
25 April 2007	Gavin O'Fearraigh		
26 April 2007	Sarah Morrissey		
-	Last DDN ever		

=== DDN Reloaded ===
There were six DDN Reloaded special episodes.

Date	Main feature	Notes	Ref
-	DDN Reloaded 1		
-	DDN Reloaded 2		
-	DDN Reloaded 3		
-	DDN Reloaded 1		
-	DDN Reloaded 5		
-	DDN Reloaded 6		
