= Damien McCaul (presenter) =

Irish radio presenter and television personality

- Born: Coombe Women's Hospital, Dublin, Ireland
- Education: Dublin Institute of Technology (DIT)
- Occupation: Presenter
- Employer(s): Q102, 98FM
- Known for: The Den

Damien McCaul is an Irish radio presenter and television personality.

== Career ==
McCaul used to present The Den, RTÉ's nationwide programming for children, where he worked alongside Dustin the Turkey for many years before quitting in May 2003.

McCaul later joined Classic Hits 4FM on their weekend show All Request Weekend. During this time he purchased a home in Glasnevin.

== Counselor ==
McCaul is a licensed Counsellor & Psychotherapist at FSN (Finglas Support and Suicide Prevention Network).
