= Ronnie Masterson =

Irish actress

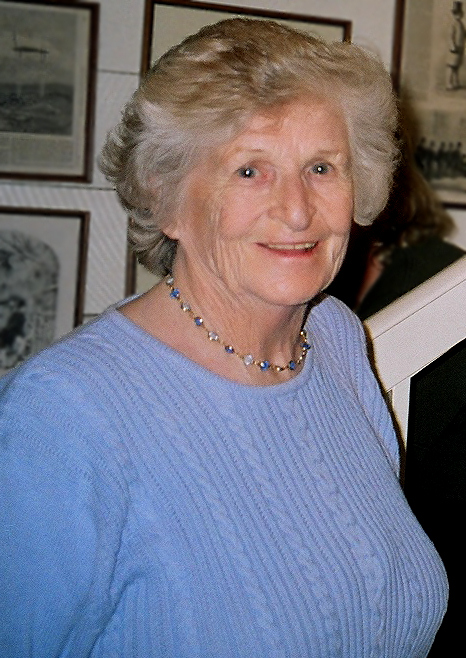
- Ronnie Masterson in 2005
- Born: 4 April 1926; Dublin, Ireland
- Died: 10 February 2014 (aged 87); Ireland
- Occupation: Actress
- Spouse: Ray McAnally (m. 1951; died 1989)
- Children: 4, including Conor and Aonghus

Ronnie Masterson (4 April 1926 – 10 February 2014) was an Irish actress.

Masterson was born in Dublin. She trained at the Abbey Theatre and first appeared on stage there in 1944. At the Abbey, she met and then married actor Ray McAnally in 1951, and they remained married until his death, although they resided in different homes; her husband with Irish actress Britta Smith. McAnally and Masterson had four children; Conor, Aonghus, Máire and Niamh.

They formed Old Quay Productions, which presented an assortment of plays such as Who's Afraid of Virginia Woolf?, The Odd Couple and many others.

Masterson had also played in the Edinburgh International Festival and in many Dublin Theatre Festival productions. She has appeared on many series broadcast on RTÉ, BBC and ITV and toured extensively in the United States in her own one woman shows. She made her film debut in 1988, playing Bridie in The Dawning.

In November 2005, she was in the United States again, this time to take the lead role in The Sea Captain, a short film directed by her son, veteran television producer Conor McAnally.

== Filmography ==
Year	Title	Role	Notes
1967	The Violent Enemy	Woman at Encampment	
1988	The Dawning	Bridie	
1990	Shoot to Kill	Mrs. Tighe	TV movie
1990	Fools of Fortune	Mrs. Flynn	
1999	Angela's Ashes	Grandma Sheehan	
2003	Bloom	Postmistress	
2005	Malice Aforethought	Miss Janet Wapworthy	TV movie
2012	Byzantium	Old Lady in Hospital	(final film role)
