= Echo Island =

Irish children's television programme

- Genre: Children
- Presented by: Emer Duane, Derek Mooney, Bláthnaid Ní Chofaigh, Carrie Crowley, Mary Kingston, Dara Ó Briain, Peter O'Meara, Danann Breathnach, Sinéad Chaomhánach, Christine Ní Chearraláin, Tom O'Brannigan, Pádraic Ó Neachtain, Kevin Kilroy
- Country of origin: Ireland
- Original languages: English; Irish

Production
- Running time: 30 minutes

Original release
- Network: RTÉ Two/Network 2 / The Den
- Release: September 1994 – June 1999

Related
- Jo Maxi; Sting

Echo Island is an Irish television programme for children and young adults, shown on RTÉ Network 2. It was shown at 17:00 during The Den, after which programmes like The Legend of the Hidden City would air. The show effectively took over from Jo Maxi, which had been aimed at the teenaged youth of Ireland.

== Birth ==
Echo Island began broadcasting in 1994 with two episodes a week. This was extended to four episodes the following year with two of these being Irish language editions. The series ran for six seasons; in later years it proved a useful showcase for some of the best young rock bands in Ireland. Many of the presenters were chosen for their bilingualism, including Dara Ó Briain.

A similar format show called Stream replaced it, splitting up each day with a different topic such as Gaming, Sports and other types of activities and did away with Echo Island's "Make and Do" and "Pet" sections. Stream did not air as in Irish, because by that stage TG4 was providing an Irish-language children's service.

== Presenters ==
Many current presenters either began, or spent part of, their early careers on Echo Island, including Derek Mooney and Bláthnaid Ní Chofaigh, Carrie Crowley, Mary Kingston, Dara Ó Briain and Peter O'Meara, Danann Breathnach, Sinéad Chaomhánach, Christine Ní Chearraláin, Tom O'Brannigan and Pádraic Ó Neachtain.

Presenter	Term of office
Emer Duane	from 1994
Derek Mooney	from 1994
Bláthnaid Ní Chofaigh	1994 - 1999
Carrie Crowley	c. 1996
Mary Kingston	c. 1996
Dara Ó Briain	c. 1996
Peter O'Meara	c. 1996
Danann Breathnach	c. 1998-1999
Sinéad Chaomhánach	c. 1998-1999
Christine Ní Chearraláin	c. 1998-1999
Tom O'Brannigan	c. 1998-1999
Pádraic Ó Neachtain	c. 1998

== Format ==
Similar in format to the BBC's Blue Peter (but with a desert island setting and design), Echo Island featured a resident Moluccan Cockatoo called Rocco, who provided the series with a constant stream of noisy background chatter. Each episode was based around an interview in "The Shack" with an adult guest, who was asked to bring along some items of significance from their childhood. U.S. ambassador Jean Kennedy Smith, for instance, appeared on the 15 November 1994 episode to promote a Christmas card competition. President Mary McAleese appeared on the programme on the 19 December 1997 episode, while the Australian didgeridoo player Rolf Harris was a guest on the 13 October 1998 episode.

Competitions, items on art and cookery, fundraising campaigns, the "Echovision Song Contest" for young performers and the "Pet Clinic" where TV Vet, Pete Wedderburn, answered viewers calls about their pets were some of the features. Each Friday edition featured young "stringers" who reported from all around Ireland on events happening in their locality. This item contained an apparently live two-way video link between the presenter in studio and the children on location and was an advanced production technique in its day.

== Since ==
- Dara Ó Briain appeared on a number of other RTÉ programmes including The Panel, Don't Feed The Gondolas and It's A Family Affair. He has since become one of the best known Irish comedians in the United Kingdom, having appeared on many of the BBC's top programmes such as Mock The Week and Three Men in a Boat.
- Derek Mooney has since become one of Ireland's best known TV and radio presenters. He currently has his week day radio show on RTÉ Radio 1. He presented Winning Streak for a number of years. He was then host of RTÉ's search for the cast of Fame: The Musical reality TV show.
- Bláthnaid Ní Chofaigh has since become one of Ireland's best known TV presenters. She presented The Afternoon Show on RTÉ One and is a judge on The All Ireland Talent Show.
- Tom O'Brannigan has since worked for both RTÉ and TG4. He was a judge on TG4's talent competition Glas Vegas.
- Carrie Crowley hosted Eurovision Song Contest 1997 alongside Ronan Keating, presented several shows on both radio and TV but was soon over exposed being on TV and radio nearly seven days a week. She has since worked on her acting career, starring in many TG4 drama productions.
- Mary Kingston also presented The Works. She also presented The Den's Disney Club for several seasons and appeared on Celebrity Farm in 2003.
- Danann Breathnach went on to present FISH (Friday It Starts Here) and then moved to MTV in the early 2000s.
- Pádraic Ó Neachtain has since presented a number of programmes with TG4. He worked with RTÉ Radio and as an editor with RTÉ Nuacht. He is the voice of Elmo and Bert in the Irish-language version of Sesame Street.
