= Tom O'Brannigan =

Tom Ó Bragaláin is a broadcaster and handball player.

== Broadcasting career ==
Ó Brannagáin has been a TV presenter for many years on TG4 and Raidió Teilifís Éireann (RTÉ), he has presented on various programmes including Hiudai, Pop TV, S.O.S., Echo Island, Telly Bingo, Open House, the St. Patrick's Day Parade, Delegation and most recently Glas Vegas. Ó Brannagáin was a teacher for many years and was until Spring 2007 the presenter of 98FM's Late Night Talk.

== Handball career ==
He played at international level for Ireland scoring 156 times in 35 international matches. He was offered a professional contract in Switzerland but declined the offer.

Ó Brannagáin also used to be the Coach of the Irish International Handball Team and was the assistant coach of the and National Coach Development for Schools in Ireland. He works with both Carsten Klavehn an A-Licence coach from Germany and David Bregazzi a B-Licence coach in training the national team. Six players now ply their trade in Germany.

Ó Brannagáin is also the voice of handball in all English speaking countries. He commentates on handball for the European Handball federation on EHFTV.com having commentated on Champion's League finals across Africa, America, Israel and Europe.
