= Mary Kingston =

Irish children's television presenter

- Born: 29 May 1970 (age 55); Inchydoney, Clonakilty, County Cork, Ireland
- Education: Honours degree in communication studies
- Occupation: Children's television presenter
- Employer: Raidió Teilifís Éireann (RTÉ)
- Spouse: Brian Graham

Mary Kingston (born 29 May 1970 in Inchydoney, County Cork), is an Irish children's television presenter. She presented The Disney Club on RTÉ Two. She also presented Scratch Saturday and The Works. Her companion dog was Fionn, an Irish Wolfhound, voiced by Michael Sheridan. The program was directed by Finin O'Ceallachain.

== Early life ==
Kingston grew up in the small seaside area of Inchydoney, the third eldest in a family of eight children. In 1981, after leaving primary school, she started attending the Sacred Heart Secondary School, Convent of Mercy, in nearby Clonakilty.

== Career ==
In college, she studied Communication studies and graduated with an Honours Degree. After leaving college, she joined Raidió Teilifís Éireann (RTÉ) as a children's television presenter, and has worked there since. She was an outside broadcast presenter on early Saturday-morning TV show Scratch Saturday. She then presented The Works, a kids science programme, for four years with Michael Sheridan, where she became known for her catchphrase, distinguishable by her regional accent: "Are you laughing?". She was a regular on The Den before hosting The Disney Club and Mary K in The Loft on Sunday mornings. For the next five years she has presented The Children of Ireland Awards with the then Taoiseach Bertie Ahern. In 2003, she took part in Celebrity Farm on RTÉ. In 2005, she took part in The Restaurant.

Kingston has authored a children's book, Fantastic Far-Flung Facts for Fun. The book describes her journey from Africa to Asia to South America to Madagascar and is a compilation of the many facts she learned along the way. It includes hundreds of the photos Kingston took and endorses her sentiment "Leave only footprints, take only memories .........and photos!"

== Personal life ==
She has travelled extensively, and holds a PADI Open Water Scuba Diving licence.

She has been involved in charity work for a number of organisations involved in the welfare of children and animals. She has spent time working with children who have a diagnosis of AIDS in a reconstructed modern hospital in Bucharest, Romania, called Dr Victor Babes. She is the junior patron for the Dublin Society for Prevention of Cruelty to Animals (DSPCA).
