= Aonghus McAnally =

Irish broadcaster, entertainer and billiards player

Aonghas McAnally
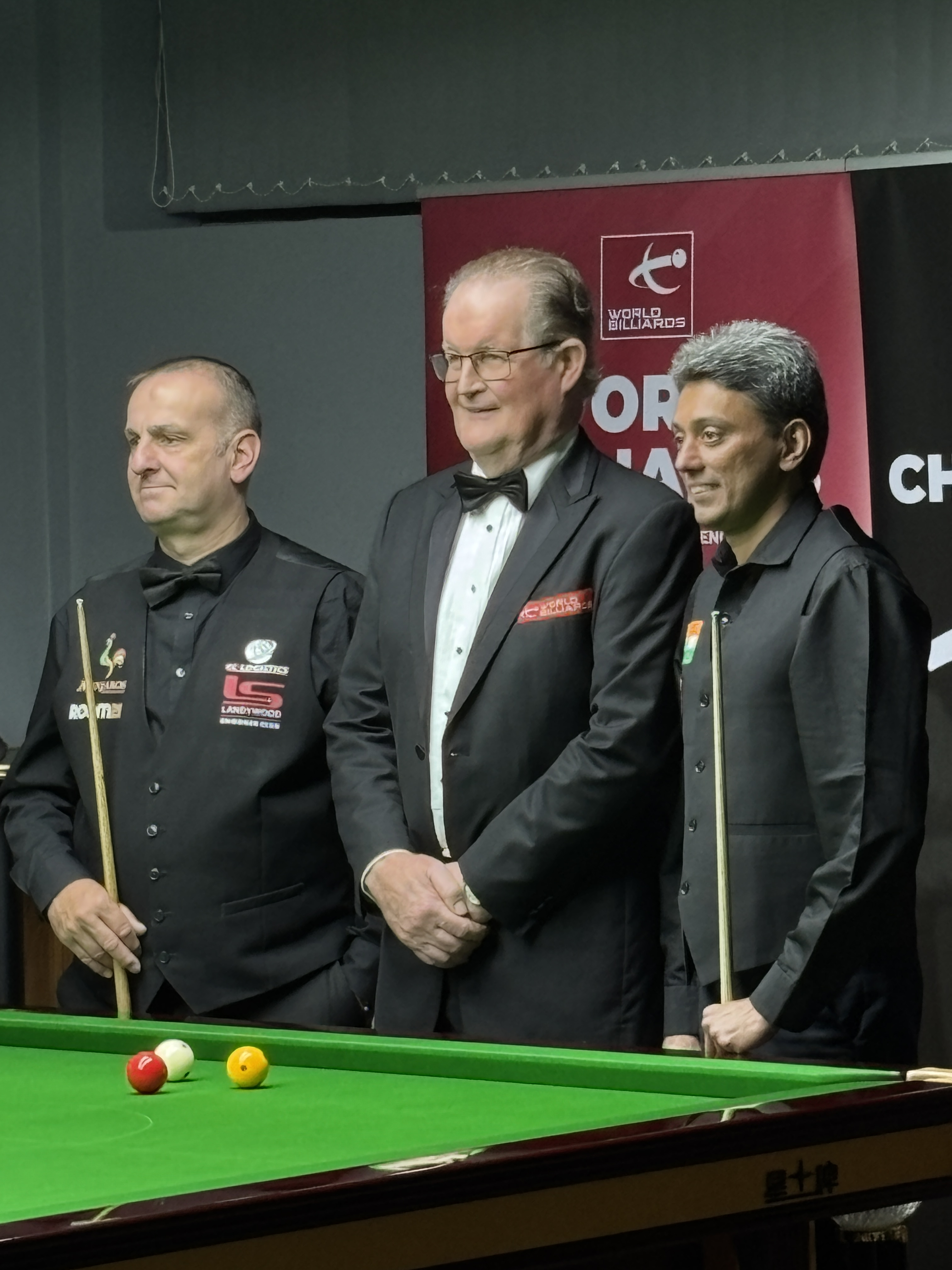
- McAnally (centre) with David Causier (left) and Dhruv Sitwala (right) at the final of the 2025 world championship of English billiards
- Born: 20 June 1955 (age 70)
- Occupations: Broadcaster, actor, musician, magician
- Known for: Anything Goes; The Lyrics Board
- Website: AonghusMcAnally.com

External image
- McAnally on an RTÉ talk show

Aonghus McAnally (born 20 June 1955) is an Irish radio and television producer and presenter, as well as an actor, musician, magician and billiards champion. He worked on both sides of the mic and camera for public service broadcaster Raidió Teilifís Éireann (RTÉ) for over 40 years, retiring in June 2020.

== Early life ==
Aonghus is one of four children born to Abbey Theatre actress Ronnie Masterson and screen actor Ray McAnally. He has two sisters, Máire, and Niamh. Film and television producer Conor McAnally is his brother.

== Music ==
McAnally has been a guitarist in a number of bands including Mushroom, Maxband, Starband and Crackers/The Crack. As a solo artist he released a novelty record I am Alergic to Christmas (written by fellow broadcaster Shay Healy) in 1981.

A friend of singer-songwriter Christie Hennessy, McAnally delivered his eulogy at his funeral. He created a touring show as tribute to Hennessy.

== Television ==
McAnally's first presenting work was on young people's programming, including Anything Goes, young adult affairs show Borderline, and magazine show Evening Extra.

Moving away from youth programming, into light entertainment, McAnally presented The Big Top TV Show, a variety show based in a circus big top.

McAnally was the presenter of the first few season of the RTÉ One song lyrics game show The Lyrics Board.

As a screen actor he had appearances on Wanderly Wagon in 1979 and a regular role in the Fir Bolg drama on TG4.

== Radio ==
McAnally presented Both Sides Now, an interview series with members of the Irish diaspora. He was a regular presenter of RTÉ Radio 1's Late Date. As a radio producer, he worked on Spectrum with former South African Ambassador, Melanie Verwoerd, and was the series producer on the daily phone-in show Liveline until his retirement in 2020.

== Cue sports ==
McAnally has played billiards at an international level. McAnally also covered snooker as an announcer and commentator.

== Other activities ==
McAnally is an accomplished magician. McAnally performed a number of stand-up gigs in the early 2000s. He created a one-man show based on his own life in 2019.

== Personal life ==
Aonghus married Billie Morton, and they have sons. He has spoken publicly about his father's battle with alcoholism, creating the Irish-language documentary Ray McAnally – M'Athair ("My Father") for TG4 in 2009. He has had hair replacement treatments.
