= A Perfect Spy (TV series) =

1987 British television drama series

- Created by: John le Carré
- Written by: Arthur Hopcraft
- Directed by: Peter Smith
- Starring: Peter Egan; Ray McAnally; Alan Howard; Rüdiger Weigang; Peggy Ashcroft; Benedict Taylor
- Theme music composer: Michael Storey
- Country of origin: United Kingdom
- Original language: English
- No. of series: 1
- No. of episodes: 7

Production
- Producers: Jonathan Powell; Colin Rogers
- Editor: Clare Douglas
- Running time: 374 min

Original release
- Network: BBC2
- Release: 4 November – 16 December 1987

A Perfect Spy is a BBC serial adaptation of John le Carré's 1986 spy novel A Perfect Spy which was aired on BBC2 and broadcast from 4 November to 16 December 1987. It follows the career of the British MI6 spy Magnus Pym from his early days as a schoolboy to his eventual disappearance under suspicion of spying for Czechoslovakia. The series was nominated for the Primetime Emmy Award for Outstanding Miniseries and the British Academy Television Award for Best Drama Series in 1988.

== Plot summary ==
A Perfect Spy traces the life story of Magnus Pym and his career in British intelligence and as a double agent. The series recounts Pym's childhood with his con-man father, his early years at school and university, his encounters with long-time friend and Czech spy Axel, and his final downfall. Unlike in the novel, the narrative unfolds mostly in chronological order.

== Main cast ==
- Peter Egan as Magnus Pym (episodes 3 to 7)
- Benedict Taylor as Young Adult Magnus Pym (episodes 1 and 2)
- Iain Cuthbertson as Makepeace Watermaster
- Jonathan and Nicholas Haley as Child Magnus Pym (episode 1)
- Ray McAnally as Rick Pym
- Rüdiger Weigang as Axel Hampel
- Alan Howard as Jack Brotherhood
- Jane Booker as Mary Pym
- Tim Healy as Syd Lemon
- Peggy Ashcroft as Miss Dubber
- Sarah Badel as Baroness Weber
- Ian McNeice as Sefton Boyd
- Julian Firth as Young Sefton Boyd
- Garrick Hagon as Grant Lederer
- Lesley Nightingale as Sabina
- Robin Hayter as Steggie

== Episodes ==
No.	Title	Original release date
1	"Episode 1"	4 November 1987
As a young boy, Magnus Pym (portrayed by Jonathan and Nicholas Haley) sees his father Rick imprisoned for embezzlement and his mother Dorothy hospitalised by the stress. Magnus fakes a fit in order to escape the abusive uncle and alcoholic aunt with whom he has been sent to live. He is rescued from hospital by his recently released father who subsequently takes him along on the con of an elderly lady. Magnus is sent to boarding school. Rick returns from the war a wealthy man and involves Magnus (portrayed by Benedict Taylor) in a plan to defraud the bomb damage compensation fund. One night Magnus is hazed by a group of boys led by his "friend" Sefton Boyd and in revenge he carves the boy's initials on the wall of the staff toilet.
2	"Episode 2"	11 November 1987
Magnus (portrayed by Benedict Taylor) is called in to help his father after the plan to defraud the bomb damage compensation fund goes awry. Baroness Weber has asked Rick to help her recover a treasure trove secreted by her late husband before the war and Magnus is sent to accompany her. Upon arrival in Switzerland the Baroness runs up a large bill, absconds with all the money and leaves Magnus down and out in Bern, in an example of the scam known as the Spanish Prisoner. After working various casual jobs, Magnus secures a scholarship to study law at the university in Bern. He befriends a Silesian émigré poet called Axel, who calls him "Sir Magnus". British intelligence officer Jack Brotherhood recruits Magnus to inform on a left-wing student group called the Cosmo Club. Magnus steals the club's membership list and Axel is revealed to be a secret member. Jack persuades Magnus to betray his friend to the Swiss authorities.
3	"Episode 3"	18 November 1987
Magnus (portrayed by Peter Egan) is called back from his studies at Oxford University to assist in his father's election campaign. Peggy Wentworth, whose late husband was conned by Rick, approaches him. Magnus breaks into his father's files and sends Rick's prison records to Peggy. Confronted at a public meeting Rick brushes off his past misdoings as youthful indiscretions. Aware of his son's betrayal he forgives him nonetheless. However his hopes of political office are destroyed by the incident. Magnus is recruited into the army and posted as an intelligence officer to Graz. Sabina, his interpreter/mistress, puts him in touch with a potential defector who turns out to be Axel. Axel hands over apparently important Soviet secret files on Magnus's guarantee of anonymity, but later when under suspicion requires Magnus to hand over secret British files in return.
4	"Episode 4"	25 November 1987
Recruited by the Foreign Office, Magnus is sent to Prague where after making a pick-up from a dead-letter-drop he is arrested by Axel, blackmailed into exchanging further secrets, and reintroduced to Sabina who joins his network of planted agents. Abandoned by his long neglected wife and reposted to Berlin, Magnus begins to court Jack's girlfriend Mary. Late one night he is summoned to police headquarters where he discovers his father is being held in the cells for yet another bungled con job. Axel encourages Magnus into marrying Mary in the belief that the girl may help them gain access to their eventual target, the Americans.
5	"Episode 5"	2 December 1987
Magnus is now married to Mary with a son called Tom and on his long-awaited posting to Washington, D.C.. He is still passing secrets but Axel is talking of retirement as things heat up. A committee of American agents headed by Harry Wexler and guided by Magnus's "friend" Grant Laderer have noticed some curiosities in the computer analysis of Magnus and his Czechoslovak networks. Celebrating Christmas with his family, Magnus is called out to a bar where he meets his now destitute father. The committee comes to London to put their suspicions to senior British intelligence officers but Jack dismisses it all as a Czechoslovak attempt to frame Magnus. Recalled to London and haunted by his past, Magnus, under a false name, takes secret lodgings in Devon.
6	"Episode 6"	9 December 1987
While on a family holiday to Corfu, Tom witnesses a meeting between his father and Axel. Axel tries to convince Magnus to retire or even defect but the double agent refuses. Jack recalls Magnus to Vienna, where he learns of his father's death. Magnus flies to London, where he arranges the funeral and for the collection of his father's files. Mary calls Jack when Magnus fails to return to Vienna. Magnus visits Sefton Boyd and apologises for his first betrayal back at boarding school. Jack goes to Vienna in search of Magnus and interrogates Mary. Magnus retires to his secret lodgings in Devon, where he enquires into local comings and goings. Jack searches Magnus's home uncovering references to someone codenamed Poppy and begins to suspect Magnus of betrayal.
7	"Episode 7"	16 December 1987
Jack continues to interrogate Mary to learn more of the mysterious Poppy. Jack learns that Magnus got references to Sabina removed from his personnel file. Recovering the doctored info, Jack learns of Magnus's mysterious contact in Graz. Axel passes a message to Mary offering his assistance in tracking the missing Magnus down. Members of Magnus's Czechoslovak networks start to go silent. Jack realises Prague is rolling up the fake network and the extent of Magnus's betrayal is finally revealed. With both sides now racing to find Magnus, Mary meets with Axel who gives her a clue as to where he is hiding. Jack and Mary drive to Devon, where a police siege of the lodging house ends with a single gunshot. Although the suicide occurs off-screen the final shot is of Magnus in the bathtub with half of his face blown away.

== Reception ==
John J. O'Connor of The New York Times cited the series as "on a par with Tinker, Tailor, Soldier, Spy and Smiley's People,", and wrote it "makes another very impressive addition to the television record of Le Carre explorations. Gloomy and disturbing, to be sure, but singularly absorbing."

== Awards and nominations ==
The series was nominated for five BAFTA Awards in 1988, for Drama Series (Colin Rogers, Peter Smith), Ray McAnally for Actor, Michael Storey for Original Music and Television Craft for Film Cameraman (Elmer Cossey) and Film Sound (Malcolm Webberley, Ken Hains, Tony Quinn, Graham Lawrence, John Hyde).

After airing in the United States on Masterpiece Theater, the series was nominated for two Emmy Awards at the 41st Primetime Emmy Awards, for Outstanding Miniseries and Peggy Ashcroft for Outstanding Supporting Actress in a Miniseries.
