= RTÉ Kids =

Irish children's television programming block

- Network: RTÉ2
- Launched: 20 September 2010; 15 years ago
- Division of: RTÉ Young People's Programming
- Country of origin: Ireland
- Owner: Raidió Teilifís Éireann (RTÉ)
- Headquarters: Montrose, Donnybrook, Dublin
- Formerly known as: TRTÉ (20 September 2010 – 6 December 2024)
- Format: Children's programming
- Original languages: English; Irish
- Official website: www.rte.ie/trte

RTÉ Kids (formerly TRTÉ) is an Irish children's television block broadcast by RTÉ2, produced by RTÉ's Young People's Programming division. First replacing The Den in 2010, the block broadcasts programmes targeting viewers 7–12 years of age; it was accompanied by RTÉ KIDSjr, which targets younger audiences.

== History ==
In late 2016, significant cutbacks drove RTÉ Young People's Programming to downsize its operations, including ending in-house production of children's programmes (relying exclusively on commissions from outside producers), and programmes targeting teenagers.

In 2017, RTÉ moved 13-15 year-olds content online. Two Tube (the teenage block) was dropped and TRTÉ targeted 7-12 year-olds.

The block was rebranded on 6 December 2024 as RTÉ Kids, retiring the TRTÉ brand name that was slowly being phased out from RTÉ2 over the previous five years. Youth programming would be promoted with RTÉ2's branding, and only TRTÉ idents were in use at the beginning of programmes.

== Logos ==
Logo used when the channel was known as TRTÉ from 2010 until 2024.

Logo used since 2024.

== See also ==
- The Den
- RTÉjr
- Cúla4
- RTÉ Jr Radio
- RTÉ Young People's Programming
