= Pádraic Ó Neachtain =

Irish television presenter (born 1973)

Pádraic Ó Neachtain (born 1973) is an Irish television presenter, director, and journalist.

He works for Telegael in Spiddal and presents feature programmes for the TG4 channel. He is a native of Inverin, County Galway. He is the eldest of five siblings. Ó Neachtain has presented, directed, and edited programmes for the TG4, RTÉ, and Nuacht RTÉ channels. He has worked for the Irish Farmers Journal and the Irish language newspaper Foinse.
