= Zig and Zag (puppets) =

Irish puppet duo

- Dempsey's Den character
- Zig (right) and Zag (left) on Tubridy Tonight, 8 November 2008
- First appearance: Dempsey's Den, 22 September 1987
- Created by: Ciaran Morrison and Mick O'Hara

In-universe information
- Species: Extraterrestrial aliens
- Gender: Male
- Nationality: Irish

Zig and Zag are an Irish puppet duo, featured on RTÉ, performed by Ciaran Morrison and Mick O'Hara.

The characters are a pair of furry extraterrestrial twins from the planet Zog. They made their television debut on 22 September 1987 on RTÉ's Dempsey's Den. Two years later they won a Jacob's Award for TV Personalities of the year. In 1992, Zig and Zag found fame in the UK when they joined the team of the Channel 4 breakfast show The Big Breakfast. During the 1990s the characters spawned a merchandising range of comic books, videos and embarked on a recording career – scoring a UK top-five single with "Them Girls Them Girls".

In 2010, the characters saw a resurgence in their popularity as they joined the Big Brother's Little Brother team and in October 2010 they were commissioned to host a flagship Saturday morning radio show on 2FM called Smells Like Saturday. A brand new TV bloopers show hosted by Zig and Zag entitled Zig & Zag's Superbloopers was announced on the RTÉ TV website. In April 2015, it was announced that the duo would return in 2016 with a 26 episode animated series Zig and Zag commissioned by RTÉ and the BBC. On 22 September 2020, RTÉ confirmed the return of The Den as a weekend family show reuniting Zig and Zag, Ray D'Arcy and Dustin the Turkey. The show returned on 8 November 2020 on RTÉ One whereas previously, the slot was on RTÉ 2.

== Characters ==
Zig and Zag's full names are Zigmund Ambrose Zogly and Zagnatius Hillary Zogly and claim they were born 29 February 1971 on Zog. Zig is beige (although he claimed to be fawn) with red "zogabongs" (pom-pom antennae) and a tuft of green hair, and Zag is purple with green spots and yellow zogabongs and dreadlocks.

In their original RTÉ incarnation, Zig often came across as the more intelligent one, with Zag under his thumb (most evident in their "Story Time" segments, when Zig would read a nursery rhyme to the audience, and Zag would grudgingly act it out). Zag also displayed a penchant for cross-dressing and playing with Barbie dolls. However, after the two moved to Channel 4, Zag began to be portrayed as the more intelligent older brother, a lecherous lady-killer who claimed to fly every weekend to Hollywood to dine with the stars, as well as performing ragga songs in his guise of "Ragga Zagga".

Zig was then portrayed as a weak-willed childish simpleton, constantly giggling at rude jokes (like the word "bottom"), obsessed with specific things (such as The Hunt for Red October or his rash) and frequently unaware of what was going on around him.

=== Alter ego characters ===
Zig and Zag frequently appeared dressed as other characters, in particular during their tenure on The Den. Such characters ranged from would-be distant relatives to superheroes.

Captain Joke – Zag's primary superhero identity, Captain Joke had no superpowers other than his ability to tell silly jokes. He wore a red mask on his eyes and matching cape and only Zig suspected his identity.

Captain Pillowcase – While Captain Joke's true identity was never discovered, Zig's first attempt at being a superhero was far less successful and was generally met with contempt. The character consisted of Zig wearing a pillowcase over his head. Captain Pillowcase's alleged special ability consisted of using his pillowcase to do impressions, such as his impression of Mount Everest or an ice cream cone melting.

Captain Shamrock – Zig's next superhero alter ego was far more successful. Captain Shamrock generally only made appearances on Saint Patrick's Day. He spoke with a strong American accent and, as such, was delivered as a satire on American tourists visiting Ireland to discover their roots. Captain Shamrock managed to convince the others that he was the primary authority on all things Irish, and would often tell nonsensical stories loosely based on Irish folklore.

Cousin Nigel – Zig and Zag's obnoxious, brattish cousin who would constantly complain about everything in a strong Birmingham accent. Cousin Nigel consisted of Zig wearing a pair of drinking glasses over his eyes and a Cub Scouts hat.

Sunny Daze – Another Zig alter ego, Sunny Daze was the star crooner at the Rotten Apple Club.

== Creators ==
Ciaran Morrison and Mick O'Hara provide the voices for Zig and for Zag, respectively. Their production company, Double Z Enterprises produced The Den when Zig and Zag featured. In 2003 they produced a TV series for Channel 4, The Bronx Bunny Show. They also regularly appear on RTÉ Two in their current incarnations of Podge and Rodge (voiced by O'Hara and Morrison respectively), fellow characters from The Den with an unsavoury past but who are now reformed enough for RTÉ to commission their own primetime chat show, The Podge and Rodge Show. Morrison and O'Hara continue to work in development and as in-demand scriptwriters for a number of companies through their partnership Double Z. They have written on animation series such as Danger Mouse, Oddbods, Kiva Can Do, Claude, Space Chickens in Space, 101 Dalmatian Street and Transformers: Rescue Bots Academy.

== TV work ==
When Ian Dempsey left the then titled Dempsey's Den in 1990, Zig and Zag remained on with his replacement Ray D'Arcy. Their alien dog, Zuppy, also featured on television at this time. Zuppy remained with The Den for some years after Zig and Zag left. After having worked on The Den for a number of years, Zig and Zag worked concurrently on The Big Breakfast, subsequently exiting The Den in June 1993 to work on the show exclusively. After their departure from RTÉ, Dustin the Turkey took over with new character Soky. The brothers' decision to work for a UK-based broadcaster caused friction with their former Den colleagues, which led to Dustin later accusing them of 'selling out to the Queen' during a live, heated exchange on 2Phat's 1998 Christmas special.

On The Big Breakfast, the two acted as interviewers in the "crunch" segment of the show. Among the memorable results was them teaching Wu-Tang Clan's Method Man and Ol' Dirty Bastard "how to fold a serviette like a pineapple". "I did like them guys," recalled ODB. "Anything to do with aliens is fine with Dirty."

During this time, they also starred in a series of adverts for Yoplait yogurts. Zig and Zag made an appearance on MTV Europe's MTV's Most Wanted, leading to their own MTV Europe sketch programme, The Zig and Zag Show. After a revamp of The Big Breakfast, they were dropped and produced a kids entertainment show, also entitled The Zig and Zag Show, for ITV. They then returned to Ireland to present the music quiz, 2Phat with Ray D'Arcy until 2001. They starred in a children's programme called Me:Tv for Nickelodeon UK and Ireland in the summer of 2006, the premise of which was kids used their own webcams to present the show. In 2010 they joined Big Brother's Little Brother team to interview past contestants.

Zig and Zag returned to Irish TV screens with an hour-long Christmas special in 2011 entitled Zig and Zag's Superbloopers co-hosted by Aidan Power. The three returned for a six-part series of the blooper show broadcast on RTÉ 1 in September 2012. A second Christmas special this time entitled Superfestivebloopers was produced and broadcast on Christmas Day 2013.

In May 2012, Double Z Productions and Flickerpix announced they were gearing up to begin production over the summer for a new, 2D animated show to debut in 2015. The series is written by Zig and Zag creators Ciaran Morrison and Mick O'Hara who will also voice the characters. The series will be produced by Ronan McCabe for Double Z and David Cumming for Flickerpix. Joel Simon, creative director at Flickerpix, will direct the series. The first animated series (26 x 11mins) simply entitled Zig and Zag was broadcast on CBBC and RTÉ in Spring 2016.

Zig and Zag made a surprise guest appearance on TFI Friday on 18 December 2015 in what is most likely the last ever live episode of the show. They had previously appeared on the show during its first season in 1996. They joined Chris Evans for the Christmas Special and when Gaby Roslin appeared later in the show she stated that it was the first time all four former Big Breakfast presenters had been together on screen in 21 years.

== Filmography ==
- Dempsey's Den (RTÉ) (1987–1990)
- The Den (RTÉ) (1990–1993)
- The Big Breakfast (Channel 4) (1992–1998, 2002)
- Entertainment Cops (1994)
- The Zig and Zag Show (MTV) (1994–1995)
- Dirty Deeds (Channel 4) (1996)
- The Zig and Zag Show (ITV) (1998)
- 2Phat (RTÉ) (1998–2001)
- Big Brother's Little Brother (Channel 4) (2010)
- Zig & Zag's Superbloopers (RTÉ) (2011–2013)
- TFI Friday (Channel 4) (1996),(2015) Guests
- Zig and Zag (CBBC, RTÉ) (2016)
- The Den (RTÉ) (2020)

== Merchandise ==
=== VHS/DVDs ===
- 1988 – Nothing to Do with Toast
- 1992 – The Best of The Big Breakfast
- 1995 – Million Quid Vid
- 2008 – Best Bitz from Back Den

=== Music ===
Zig and Zag's first single, "The Christmas No. 1" reached No. 1 in Ireland in 1990 at Christmas and stayed there for five weeks. Their album, Never Mind the Zogabongs... Here's Zig and Zag and second single "Zig Zaggin' Around" both also topped the Irish charts in 1991. On the back of their success on The Big Breakfast, the pair were signed by Simon Cowell and released two singles on RCA. "Them Girls, Them Girls" produced by DJ Erick Morillo was released throughout Europe and its highest chart position in the UK charts was at No. 5 for the week ending 7 January 1995.

Albums

- 1991 – Never Mind the Zogabongs... Here's Zig and Zag

Singles

- 1990 – "The Christmas No. 1" (IE #1) - a 2020 remix version was released as an on-line only download for charity.
- 1991 – "Zigzaggin'" (IE #1)
- 1992 – "Outback Boogie in Malebrawonga"
- 1994 – "Them Girls, Them Girls" with DJ Erick Morillo featuring backing vocals by Jocelyn Brown and Althea McQueen
- 1995 – "Hands Up, Hands Up" with Rednex
- 2014 – "We All Stand Together" as The Zog Chorus with Bosco, Dustin the Turkey and Pajo - charity single in aid of Childline (IE #4)

=== Books ===
Zig and Zag produced a number of books in Ireland and the UK. The first five books in the list were produced exclusively in Ireland as paperback fully illustrated comic books. In the UK, a further two comic book style paperbacks were produced; a hardback annual, a tie-in book with their TV series Dirty Deeds, with photographs and text related to the series and a 416-page joke book.

- The Fridge in a Denim Jacket (1989) – the 25th anniversary edition was released on 20 October 2014 (O'Brien Press)
- Revenge of the Nellies (1989)
- Strawberry Jelly (1990)
- Dial 'D' for Dustin (1990)
- Kangaroos in Bikinis (1991)
- Chilli & Chocolate Flavour (1992)
- In Yer Face (1994)
- Big Sexy Book (1994)
- The Killer Annual from Outer Space (1995)
- The Dirty Deeds Dossier (1996)
- The Big, Bad Joke Book (1996)

== Awards ==
Jacob's Radio and Television Awards:

- TV Personalities of the Year 1989

"For keeping the children of the nation happy"

National Entertainment Awards (Ireland):

- TV Personalities of the Year 1989

Royal Television Society Award:

- The Big Breakfast – Programme Award 1992

Promax Awards:

- Best Sales/Marketing Tape – Zig & Zag Media Buyers Appeal (UK)

== See also ==
- Roland Rat
