= Denis Allen (singer) =

Irish musician

Denis Allen is a singer/songwriter based in County Limerick, Ireland. He wrote and sang the song "Limerick You're A Lady" which went to number one in Ireland in 1979 for several weeks and stayed in the chart for about a year. It has since been recorded by over forty different artists.

== Discography ==
- Limerick You're a Lady
- Late Starters in Love with Denis Carey
- Shannon River with Denis Carey
- featured on: Coming Home Joseph Ruane (composer); Mick Ryan (singer)
