= Celebrity Farm =

Irish television series

Celebrity Farm is a 2003 Raidió Teilifís Éireann (RTÉ) reality television show, based on the international TV format The Farm, produced by Strix.

Held along similar lines as I'm a Celebrity... Get Me Out of Here!, Celebrity Farm required eight of Ireland's C-List celebrities to spend seven days on a farm with one being voted off every evening (or "turfed out" as RTÉ called it). It was hosted by Ear to the Ground presenter Mairead McGuinness and the prize money was €50,000 to the charity of their choice.

== Results ==
Evictions were decided via a public televote, where the contestant getting the most votes would be "turfed out".

- 1st evicted: Twink, pantomime actress
- 2nd evicted: Paddy O'Gorman, TV presenter
- 3rd evicted: Mary Coughlan, jazz musician
- 4th evicted: Kevin Sharkey, artist
- 5th evicted: Mary Kingston, children's TV presenter
- 6th evicted: Tamara Gervasoni, then Rose of Tralee
- Runner-up: Gavin Lambe-Murphy, gossip columnist
- Winner: George McMahon, soap actor

The show was won by George McMahon, an actor from Fair City. He split his prize money between a children's charity, a children's hospital and a centre for those with disabilities. Kevin Sharkey had a serious disagreement with the other "farmhands", as they were called, and subsequently refused to appear with them on The Late Late Show after the series, instead appearing on rival chat show The Dunphy Show.

== Legacy ==
Celebrity Farm left a pitiful legacy for Irish television viewers. One witness reported that it had taken until 2012 "to finally stop shuddering at the memory of such sitting room atrocities as RTÉ's Celebrity Farm".
