= RTÉ KIDSjr =

Irish children's TV channel

- Country: Ireland
- Broadcast area: Ireland; Northern Ireland
- Headquarters: Donnybrook, Dublin

Programming
- Languages: English; Irish
- Picture format: 1080p 16:9 (HDTV) (RTÉ Player & Sky Glass); 576i 16:9 (SDTV)

Ownership
- Owner: Raidió Teilifís Éireann
- Sister channels: RTÉ One; RTÉ2; RTÉ News; RTÉ Kids

History
- Launched: 20 September 2010 (programming block); 27 May 2011 (simulcast channel); 15 April 2013 (stand-alone channel)
- Former names: RTÉjr (2010–2025)

Links
- Website: rte.ie/kids

Availability

Terrestrial
- See separate section

Streaming media
- See separate section

RTÉ KIDSjr (formerly RTÉjr) is an Irish free-to-air children's television channel owned and operated by Raidió Teilifís Éireann (RTÉ). The channel mainly targets 2- to 7-year-olds, but some cartoons for older children also air. The channel is part of RTÉ Kids.

The channel broadcasts 12 hours of programming each day between 7:00 am and 7:00 pm. It is supported by additional services available on-demand, on mobile and online. The channel operates alongside its sister strand RTÉ Kids on RTÉ2. Until 2025, there was a companion radio service called RTÉ Jr Radio.

== History ==
RTÉjr was initially a programming block on public service broadcaster RTÉ2, launching on 20 September 2010, replacing Den Tots.

On 3 May 2011, RTÉjr (which was only a programming block at that time) broadcast Punky, the world's first animated series which focuses on the life and adventures of a girl with Down syndrome. The show is broadcast daily at 10:25 and 13:45. It was designed by award-winning Irish animation company Monster Animation and Design.

RTÉ planned on launching a television channel dedicated to RTÉjr; it launched on 27 May 2011, at 11:00 (IST). The channel does not carry advertising, in line with the broadcaster's policy not to target advertising towards those under six years of age.

By April 2013, the channel began a stand-alone schedule; however, plans to replace the RTÉjr block on RTÉ2 have yet to come to light. The channel broadcasts as a stand-alone channel with its own schedule and new programming.

On 15 April 2013, the channel hosted 14 newly commissioned programmes, including the bilingual show Spraoi, the dance show Move It! and RTÉjr Workshop.

On 26 November 2025, the RTÉjr channel and programming block were rebranded as RTÉ KIDSjr. This follows TRTÉ's rebrand to RTÉ Kids in 2024.

== Availability ==
The channel is available to 98% of television viewers in Ireland through Saorview. The channel became available on Virgin Media Ireland on channel 600 on 15 March 2012 and on Sky Ireland on channel 624 (635 in NI) on 15 April 2013. The channel's programming can be viewed internationally through its on-demand service, mobile services and website.

=== Cable ===
- Virgin Media Ireland: Channel 600

=== IPTV ===
- eir TV Ireland: Channel 612
- Vodafone Ireland: Channel 600

=== Satellite ===
- Sky UK: Channel 621 (Northern Ireland)
- Sky Ireland: Channel 616
- Saorsat Ireland: Channel 7

=== Online ===
- RTÉ Player Ireland: Watch live

=== Terrestrial ===
- Saorview Ireland: Channel 17

== Programming ==
The channel has a wide range of live-action and animated programming, usually dubbed in either Irish or English, these are mainly Irish-produced programs (such as Boy Girl Dog Cat Mouse Cheese and Puffin Rock), however, there are some acquired programming (mainly sourced from the BBC).

Its flagship programme is hosted by former Six member Emma O'Driscoll, Muireann NiChiobhain, Clara Murray and their puppet friends Séamus the dog and Bláithín the flower fairy.

== Logos ==
Logo used when from 2010 until 2025.

Logo used since 2025.
