= Sabrina the Teenage Witch (disambiguation) =

Sabrina the Teenage Witch is a comic book series published by Archie Comics.

Sabrina the Teenage Witch may also refer to:

== Comics ==
- Sabrina Spellman, the title character of the comic book series Sabrina the Teenage Witch
- Chilling Adventures of Sabrina, a comic book series published by Archie Horror

== Film ==
- Sabrina the Teenage Witch (film), a 1996 American film
- Sabrina Goes to Rome, a 1998 American television film
- Sabrina Down Under, a 1999 American television film
- Sabrina: Friends Forever, a 2002 American animated film

== Television ==
- Sabrina the Teenage Witch (1970 TV series), an American animated television series
- Sabrina the Teenage Witch (1996 TV series), an American television series
- Sabrina: The Animated Series, an American animated television series
- Sabrina's Secret Life, an American animated television series
- Sabrina: Secrets of a Teenage Witch, an American animated television series
- Chilling Adventures of Sabrina (TV series), an American television series

== See also ==
- Teen Witch, a 1989 American film
- "Teen-a Witch", an episode of Bob's Burgers
