= Ray McAnally =

Irish actor (1926–1989)

- Born: 30 March 1926; Moville, County Donegal, Ireland
- Died: 15 June 1989 (aged 63); County Wicklow, Ireland
- Years active: 1957–1989
- Spouse: Ronnie Masterson (m. 1951, separated)
- Children: 4, including Conor and Aonghus
- Awards: BAFTA – Best Supporting Actor 1986 The Mission 1989 My Left Foot; BAFTA (TV) – Best Actor 1989 A Very British Coup

Ray McAnally (30 March 1926 – 15 June 1989) was an Irish actor. He was the recipient of three BAFTA Awards in the late 1980s: two BAFTA Film Awards for Best Supporting Actor (for The Mission in 1986 and My Left Foot in 1989), and a BAFTA Television Award for Best Actor for A Very British Coup in 1989. In 2020, he was ranked at number 34 on The Irish Times's list of Ireland's greatest film actors.

== Background ==
Ray McAnally was born in Buncrana, a seaside town located on the Inishowen peninsula of County Donegal, Ireland and raised in the nearby town of Moville from the age of three. The son of a bank manager, he was educated at St Eunan's College in Letterkenny where he wrote, produced and staged a musical called Madame Screwball at the age of 16. He entered Maynooth College at the age of 18 but left after a short time having decided that the priesthood was not his vocation. He joined the Abbey Theatre in 1947 where he met and married actress Ronnie Masterson.

== Acting career ==
McAnally and Masterson later formed Old Quay Productions and presented an assortment of classic plays in the 1960s and 1970s. He made his West End theatre debut in 1962 with A Nice Bunch of Cheap Flowers and gave a well-received performance as George in Who's Afraid of Virginia Woolf?, opposite Constance Cummings, at the Piccadilly Theatre.

On television he was a familiar face, often in glossy thriller series like The Avengers, Man in a Suitcase and Strange Report. In 1968 he took the title role in Spindoe, a series charting the return to power of an English gangster, Alec Spindoe, after a five-year prison term. This was a spin-off from another series, The Fellows (1967) in which McAnally appeared as the Spindoe character in several episodes. He could render English accents very convincingly.

In 1976 McAnally appeared in the Granada Television daytime series Crown Court. He played the character of Robert Scard, a confidence trickster found guilty of fraud.

In 1988, a century after the Whitechapel Murders, he appeared in the television mini-series Jack the Ripper. McAnally played William Gull, a Physician-in-Ordinary to Queen Victoria, who the program claimed was the killer.

McAnally regularly acted in the Abbey Theatre and at Irish festivals, but in the last decade of life he achieved award-winning notice on TV and films. His performance as Cardinal Altamirano in the film The Mission (1986) earned him Evening Standard and BAFTA awards. He earned a BAFTA Award nomination for his role in the BBC's A Perfect Spy and the ScreenPlay drama Scout in 1988 for the 1987 BAFTA Awards. Then in 1989 he won the 1988 BAFTA for Best Actor for his performance in A Very British Coup, a role that also brought him a Jacob's Award, and just three months before his sudden death. In the last year of his life, he portrayed the father of Christy Brown in the award-winning film My Left Foot.

== Death ==
McAnally died suddenly of a heart attack on 15 June 1989, aged 63, at his home, which he shared with Irish actress Britta Smith. He remained married to actress Ronnie Masterson until his death, although they lived apart. He received a posthumous BAFTA Award for Best Supporting Actor for his last film My Left Foot in 1990.

At the time of his death he was due to play 'Bull' McCabe in Jim Sheridan's film The Field. The part eventually went to Richard Harris, who received an Oscar nomination for his performance. McAnally had also been cast in the lead role of First and Last, a drama about a man who walked from Land's End to John o' Groats. Almost a third of the filming had been completed when he died but the whole play had to be refilmed, with Joss Ackland taking the role instead.

McAnally had four children: Conor, Aonghus, Máire, and Niamh. Conor is a producer, based in Texas, and Aonghus is a television and radio presenter/producer in Ireland.

== Filmography ==
- Professor Tim (1957) – Hugh O'Cahan
- She Didn't Say No! (1958) – Jim Power
- Sea of Sand (1958) – Sgt. Hardy
- Shake Hands with the Devil (1959) – Paddy Nolan
- The Naked Edge (1961) – Donald Heath
- Murder in Eden (1961) – Inspector Sharkey
- Billy Budd (1962) – William O'Daniel – Maintopman
- He Who Rides a Tiger (1965) – Orphanage Superintendent
- The Looking Glass War (1970) – Undersecretary of State
- Quest for Love (1971) – Jack Kahn
- Fear Is the Key (1972) – Ruthven
- Pollyanna (1973) – John Pendleton
- Public Eye (1974) - Tyson
- Crown Court (1976, TV drama: 'Scard') – Robert E. Scard
- The Outsider (1979) – MacWhirter
- The Sleep of Death (1980) – Inspector Carmingac
- Angel (1982) – Bloom
- Cal (1984) – Cyril Dunlop
- No Surrender (1985) – Billy McRacken
- The Mission (1986) – Cardinal Altamirano
- Empire State (1987) – Frank
- The Fourth Protocol (1987) – General Yevgeny Sergeyevich Karpov
- The Sicilian (1987) – Trezza
- White Mischief (1987) – Morris
- Scout (1987) – Palmer
- A Perfect Spy (1987, TV Series) – Rick Pym
- Last of the Summer Wine (1987, Christmas Special Big Day at Dream Acres) – The Tramp
- Taffin (1988) – O'Rourke
- A Very British Coup (1988, British TV series) – The Cabinet – Harry Perkins
- Jack the Ripper (1988, TV Movie) – Sir William Gull
- High Spirits (1988) – Plunkett Senior
- My Left Foot (1989) – Mr. Brown
- Venus Peter (1989) – Grandpa
- We're No Angels (1989) – Warden (final film role)
