= MT-USA =

- Title card
- Genre: Music television
- Created by: Green Apple Productions
- Presented by: Vincent Hanley
- Country of origin: Ireland
- Original language: English
- No. of seasons: 3

Production
- Running time: 3 hours

Original release
- Network: RTÉ 2
- Release: February 19, 1984 – 1987

MT-USA (Music Television — USA) was an Irish music television programme broadcast between February 1984 and 1987. Known for the slogan, "Music Television USA - Music never looked better", it was produced by Green Apple Productions, co-founded by the show's presenter Vincent Hanley. MT-USA was broadcast on RTÉ 2 on Sunday afternoons and during the 1984–85 series was repeated on Friday nights. Each edition ran for three hours. Each block of videos was followed by a segment filmed in New York City with Hanley introducing the videos, discussing American music and culture, and interviewing a celebrity. RTÉ described him as Europe's first VJ (video jockey). The videos were primarily American acts, many previously little-known in Ireland., but the show also featured English pop chart acts, as well as up and coming Irish acts such as U2, In Tua Nua & Light a Big Fire. A double-CD and DVD compilation featuring acts from the show's heyday went on release on 16 November 2007.
