= 2Phat =

Irish television programme

2Phat is an Irish television programme that was shown twice weekly on Network 2 from 1998 to 2000. It reunited Ray D'Arcy and Zig and Zag, who had previously appeared together on The Den. Following the demise of this show, all three would not appear together again until 14 November 2008, when D'Arcy hosted a Den Reunion Reunited special on his Today FM programme The Ray D'Arcy Show.

== Format ==
The theme music for the opening of the TV show was a version of "On Her Majesty's Secret Service" by Propellerheads. Other music was provided by DJ Lee.

The show typically consisted of 15 audience members, and would involve a series of short sketches which led to a question. The person who buzzed in first got a chance to answer the question. At the end of the show, one person would be selected at random (from the people who answered a question correctly) to play the final round. The final prize was a motor scooter.

Recurring segments included several involving "Velcro Girl", a model (Tracy Sheridan) dressed in a velcro-covered catsuit. Items stuck to the suit provided hints to an artist's identity, which the audience would guess.
