= The Den (TV programme) =

Irish children's television programme

- The Den 2005 logo
- Also known as: Dempsey's Den (1986–1990); The Den (1990-1993, 2002–2010, 2020); Den TV (1993-1998); Den 2 (1998–2002)
- Presented by: Ian Dempsey (1986–1990); Ray D'Arcy (1990–98, 2020); Damien McCaul (1998–2003); Francis Boylan, Jnr (2003–05); Kathryn McKiernan (2005–2010)
- Starring: Aunt Monica, Dustin the Turkey, Snotser, Soky, Zig and Zag, Zuppy
- Country of origin: Ireland
- Original language: English
- No. of episodes: Over 5,000

Production
- Production locations: Dublin; on location
- Production company: RTÉ

Original release
- Network: RTÉ One (1986–88, 2020); RTÉ Two (1988–2010)
- Release: 29 September 1986 – 20 December 2020

Related
- 2Phat, Anything Goes, A Scare at Bedtime, Dustin's Daily News, Echo Island, Jo Maxi, The Podge and Rodge Show

The Den is a long-running children's entertainment television programme on Ireland's public broadcaster, RTÉ.

First broadcast on 29 September 1986 on RTÉ1, it moved to Network 2 two years later.

Initially a continuity strand for weekday afternoon programmes, The Den later expanded during the late 1990s and the 2000s, until it became synonymous with RTÉ's children's output.

At various times during its run, it was known as Dempsey's Den, Den TV and Den2.

In mid-2010, RTÉ Television announced an overhaul of its children's output with the launch of RTÉjr and TRTÉ (now RTÉ Kids). The Den aired for the last time on 19 September 2010.

The Den name returned for six weeks from November 2020 on RTÉ1, reuniting members of the original cast in a Sunday-evening variety-show format, predominantly aimed at families living through the country's continuing Covid-19 lockdowns.

== Overview ==
The Den is considered to have pushed the boundaries of what was considered acceptable viewing for children and young people during its ratings peak in the 1990s, often employing irreverent and occasionally satirical humour within its continuity links, including integrating current affairs and world events to ongoing storylines and character development.

It also reintroduced anthropomorphic puppet characters to Irish pop-culture, including Zig and Zag, Podge and Rodge, Soky the Sock Monster, and Dustin the Turkey. Zig and Zag later transferred to Channel 4; Podge and Rodge moved onto adult comedy programming on RTÉ (including their own talk show); while Dustin went on to represent Ireland in the Eurovision Song Contest, among other media appearances.

In later years, The Den took up much of Network 2's daytime schedule, airing for over 11 hours each weekday and on weekend mornings. It also acquired a reputation for airing new episodes of imported shows before other television networks in Europe. There were no commercial breaks during shows on The Den, although there were commercial breaks between shows.

== Broadcast history ==
President of Ireland Mary Robinson makes a live appearance on The Den in 1990.

Following on from the success of a Children's BBC (CBBC) strand in the UK, RTÉ launched its own strand for children's programming, Dempsey's Den, on 29 September 1986. Initially it was a two-hour strand each weekday afternoon on RTÉ 1 featuring nearly all of the broadcaster's youth output (the main exceptions being Bosco and Jo Maxi).

Taking a cue from CBBC's Broom Cupboard format, Dempsey's Den was broadcast live from a tiny, single-camera presentation studio at RTÉ Television Centre, used mostly for in-vision continuity. Upon its move to Network 2 in September 1988, Dempsey's Den gained an extra hour of airtime each weekday.

Ian Dempsey fronted the strand until the summer of 1990, although he continued to present the music feature Pop Goes the Den for a number of years. Ray D'Arcy took over The Den from 1990 to 1998, followed by Damien McCaul (1998-2003), Francis Boylan Jr (2003-2005) and Kathryn McKiernan (2005-2008).

=== 1986–1998 ===
Dempsey's Den logo used in 1988-1990

The Den launched as Dempsey's Den in 1986, with Irish radio personality Ian Dempsey acting as presenter. He was joined in 1987 by puppets, adolescent alien brothers Zig and Zag, hailing from the planet Zog, and recognisable by their zogabongs, spring-like antennae – who initially sought to 'collect jokes', and often used their roles and alternate personae on the show as a means of exploring human popular culture. The trio would later be joined by the brothers' extraterrestrial pet dog Zuppy, initially cast as a boisterous, mildly destructive counterfoil to Zag's more gentle nature, and later becoming a non-verbal staple of the strand's various incarnations.

In April 1989, the show produced a week of content from Los Angeles in California, visiting sites such as Universal Studios.

The trio were joined by puppet Dustin the Turkey-Vulture in December 1989, after Zag won Dustin in a golf tournament. Unaware that he was due to be slaughtered, cooked and consumed for that year's Christmas dinner, Dustin won the Irish public's affections with his inner-city Dublin accent and gregarious demeanour. Unable to bring themselves to kill the now-popular bird, the show's crew accepted him as one of their number – although subsequent part-time employment as 'a builder' became one of many running jokes, including the seemingly never-ending completion of off-screen neighbour, Mrs. Murphy's gate.

The Den format changed little over its first decade on air. It generally consisted of several cartoons in English and Irish, music videos, at least one RTÉ production, a daily birthday slot, and on certain days of the week, a viewers' quiz. Occasional features included location inserts, interviews and sketches. In September 1990, following Ian Dempsey's departure, Ray D'Arcy became the presenter, and the programme was relaunched under the name The Den.

Following her election as the first female President of Ireland in 1990, Mary Robinson made her first television appearance as president-elect on The Den. During a loud and chaotic conversation with the puppets, she confronted Dustin the Turkey for having accused her previously of having smelly feet, and teased him about his poor "performance" in the election, where the puppet's name was used by some electors to spoil their votes. She was asked by one of the Zig and Zag duo, "Mary, how much money do you have?" She also talked about her children and showed to viewers, and talked about, several large greeting cards sent to her by schoolchildren. This would foreshadow several storyline election campaigns by Dustin over the course of the decade – invariably running for the Fianna Fowl party – which in turn led to the character's rise to infamy among Irish voters and political observers as a spoilt-vote candidate.

In September 1993, the strand's name was changed to Den TV.

The show's studio set changed annually; a running joke reflecting the storyline 'nuisance' status experienced by the Den crew within the state broadcaster's internal hierarchy, and a subtle commentary on its funding of young people's output. Locations included Number 10 Celebrity Square, in which Dustin set up a chip van for a period (1992-1993), a building site, a treehouse (1995-1996), a caravan (1996-1997), a smelly shed (1997-1998), a big bus (1998-1999), a hair salon called On The Noggin (1999-2000) and a spaceship. The presenter tended to sit behind a desk (or counter in the chip van), with any puppets perched between the desk and the camera.

In September 1992, Zig and Zag joined Channel 4's The Big Breakfast in the UK, eventually leaving The Den after the 1992-1993 season to spend more time appearing live on British and European television.

Shortly into the 1993-1994 season, Dustin neglected to do the washing for so long that smelly socks in the linen bin at the back of the set eventually came to life, in the form of Soky the Sock Monster. Initially making silent cameo appearances at the end of a broadcast day for eagle-eyed viewers, Soky was a gentle, child-like creature that immediately imprinted upon D'Arcy upon being discovered, referring to him thereafter as 'Mammy Ray'. Popular among the strand's very young viewers, Soky's behaviour and humour often reflected the perspectives of a human toddler, including a fondness for comfort items, such as his blue bucket.

D'Arcy's last broadcast was on Friday 29 May 1998.

=== 1998–2005 ===
Den 2 1998-2002 logo

Damien McCaul and Dustin the Turkey on Den2 after the 1998 relaunch

In September 1998, the Den was relaunched under the name Den 2, with Damien McCaul taking over as presenter. A morning show, Den AM, was presented by Geri Maye and Soky, beginning in 1998. A further strand aimed at older children, iD, aired from 5 pm to 7 pm.

Den 2 was broadcast continuously from morning to evening, but in-vision continuity was confined to the morning and afternoon strands. As Den 2, the programme launched a website in October 1999. In 2003, the strand gained its own daily news bulletin, news2day, similar in format to the BBC's Newsround.

The programme's name reverted to The Den in 2002. Damien McCaul left the presenter's role at the end of the 2002-2003 season and was replaced by Francis Boylan Jr in September 2003. Boylan remained as presenter until June 2005.

=== 2005–2010 ===
The Den was revamped again on 17 September 2005 with a new graphics package designed by Dunning Eley Jones (now Dunning Penney Jones).

By now, the strand had been split into several daily shows, including Wakey Wakey, Den Tots and The Club, alongside the existing news2day bulletin at 5 pm. This final revamp removed much of the cast (bar Dustin, Soky, Charly and Zuppy), with Dustin moving to his own programme, Dustin's Daily News.

It also refocused the breakfast slot away from pre-school children and towards older viewers, with one continuity presenter, Kathryn McKiernan, fronting both morning and afternoon shows.

In September 2008, the separate shows were axed and in-vision presentation was replaced with out-of-vision announcements.

The Den ceased in September 2010 when RTÉ launched two new strands for its children's output: RTÉjr and TRTÉ.

=== 2020 ===
Following a popular Comic Relief special reunion episode in June 2020, on 22 September 2020, RTÉ confirmed the return of The Den as a new weekend family show, reuniting Ray D'Arcy with Zig and Zag and Dustin the Turkey.

The show returned to RTÉ One on 8 November 2020 and ran for six episodes including a Christmas Special, airing on Sunday evenings, the station's long-established 'appointment-viewing' slot.

=== Special episodes ===
- Christmas 1988: Dempsey's Den Goes to Santaland: The first Christmas special. The gang travel to Santaland.
- Christmas 1991: Must Go to Moscow: The gang travel to Moscow.
- Christmas 1991: Turn On the Christmas lights at Dublin Airport: Ray D'Arcy, Zig and Zag travel to Dublin Airport to turn on the Christmas lights.
- October 1992: The Den Goes Disney: The gang travel to Euro Disney.
- Christmas 1992: Christmas Crisis: Podge breaks into Number 10 Celebrity Square, steals a gift of aftershave meant for Ray D'Arcy's mother and breaks D'Arcy's clock, and frames Zig. The episode culminates in a trip to Lapland to save Santa, who has been kidnapped by Podge.
- Christmas 1993: Together for Xmas: Zig and Zag return to the show on the occasion of a Swiss chocolate being made in Zag's likeness. Zag has become self-obsessed since becoming a celebrity in the UK, and is led on a journey of self-realisation.
- 1996: The Den is 10: A reunion episode celebrating the 10th anniversary of The Den.
- Christmas 1996: Christmas Crisis 2: Zig and Zag return again for a Christmas gathering with the gang at Cranberry Lodge, 10 Celebrity Hill. Over the course of the evening, Podge and Rodge conspire to kidnap each guest, one by one.
- Halloween 1997: Halloween on the Den: Podge and Rodge trick Dustin into thinking he has won the Irish presidential election, and lure him to a house that they convince him is Áras an Uachtarán, where they plan to kidnap the gang and take over the Den.
- Christmas 1998: The Den Christmas Special: The gang travel to New York to find a Mr Blue Bucket with removable arms for Soky for Christmas.
- Halloween Special (2003?): Presenter gets turned into a bird at a haunted house and Dustin tells him to keep his feathers on.
- June 2020: Comic Relief Special

== Presenters ==
| Presenter | Period |
|---|---|
| Ian Dempsey | 1986–1990 |
| Ray D'Arcy | 1990–1998, 2020 |
| Damien McCaul | 1998–2003 |
| Francis Boylan Jr | 2003–2005 |
| Kathryn McKiernan | 2005–2010 |

=== Assistants ===
During the Dempsey years, The Den assistant was Celine, who would later present Jo Maxi when D'Arcy departed that programme to succeed Ian Dempsey.

Ciara Carroll served as a regular assistant during D'Arcy's time as presenter. She would arrive at the studio to announce new competitions, provide observations from behind the camera and her laughter could often be heard in the background as Zig and Zag accused her of being responsible for breaking wind. She would also include herself during many other features throughout the day.

In its latter years, The Den remained on air during the summer, either using temporary cover presenters (Aidan Power, Aoileann Garavaglia, etc.) or with no presenter-led continuity.

== Home-produced programming ==
These included programming such as Echo Island, The Grip and The Works.

== Revivals ==
On 27 October 2008, a compilation episode, Best Bitz From Back Den, was broadcast on RTÉ One. The episode featured clips dating back to Zig and Zag's origins on The Den. It was compiled to celebrate the 21st anniversary of Zig and Zag. It was released on DVD a month later. Presenters D'Arcy and Dempsey featured heavily in the special. Other highlights included assaults perpetrated by Ted (a malicious panda) on the presenters, Christmas specials of The Den, footage of other characters such as Captain Joke, Captain Pillowcase and Cousin Nigel, and the 1989 Irish Film and Television awards at which Zig and Zag "accidentally" mistook then Taoiseach Albert Reynolds for actor Burt Reynolds and addressed him as "your majesty".

On 14 November 2008, an edition of The Ray D'Arcy Show (then of Today FM) aired live from Vicar Street in Dublin, reflecting on the formative years of The Den from 1986 - 1994.

On 8 November 2009, a compilation episode, Dustin: 20 Years a Pluckin', was broadcast on RTÉ One. It was also released on DVD. It was compiled to celebrate the 20th anniversary of Dustin the Turkey.

The Den returned for a Comic Relief charity special on 26 June 2020.

== See also ==
- Cúla 4 - Irish-language children's channel
