= Dustin the Turkey =

Fictional character

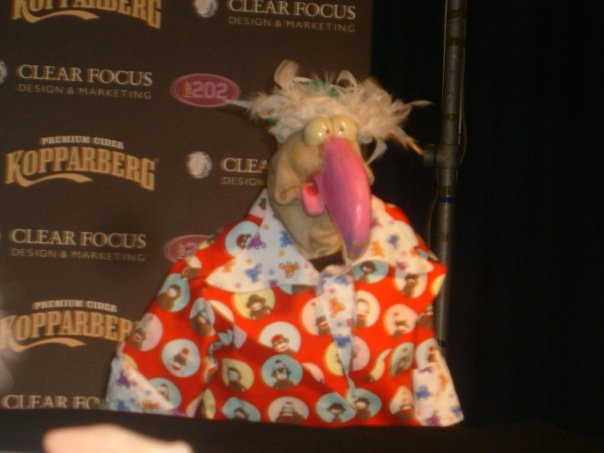
- Dustin the Turkey in 2008
- First appearance: Dempsey's Den (1989)
- Last appearance: Morning Glory with PJ & Jim (2025)
- Portrayed by: John Morrison

In-universe information
- Species: Turkey
- Occupation: Cowboy builder, singer, TV presenter
- Affiliation: UNICEF
- Origin: Dublin, Ireland

Dustin the Turkey, a character performed by John Morrison is a former star of RTÉ television's The Den between 1989 and 2010 and for the show's six-episode revival in 2020. He has been described as "the most subversive comedy force on Irish television".

A turkey vulture with a strong Dublin accent hailing from Sallynoggin, Dustin first appeared on The Den with Zig and Zag in December 1989, but remained there after their 1993 departure to Channel 4. He also outlasted four human co-hosts, all of whom moved to radio: Ian Dempsey, Ray D'Arcy, Damien McCaul and Francis Boylan Jr.

Dustin has also had a successful music career with chart-topping singles in his native land. At one stage he even managed an Irish dance/pop group, Silvor. He won the public vote to represent Ireland at the Eurovision Song Contest 2008 with the song "Irelande Douze Pointe", though he did not progress past the first semi-final stage.

== Music ==
Dustin released his Greatest Hits album in 2001. On 4 November 2005, he released his first new single for four years, "Patricia the Stripper", a duet with Chris de Burgh a.k.a. Christy Burger. On 11 November 2005, he then released a new album, also his first for four years, titled Bling When You're Minging (a play on the title of Robbie Williams' 2000 album Sing When You're Winning).

These albums featured backing vocals from many Irish stars including Ronnie Drew, Bob Geldof, Boyzone and the late Joe Dolan. Many of his songs are parodies of either folk songs or well known chart hits from across the decades.

=== Albums ===
- Not Just a Pretty Face (1994)
- Unplucked (1996)
- Faith of Our Feathers (1997)
- Poultry in Motion (1999)
- Dustin's Greatest Hits (2001) - IRE #4
- Bling When You're Minging (2005) - IRE #8

=== Singles ===
- "The Christmas No. 1" (Zig and Zag feat. Dustin the Turkey) (1990) - IRE #1
- "Numb" (1993)
- "Spanish Lady" (feat. Ronnie Drew and the Saw Doctors) (1994) - IRE #1
- "Rat Trap" (with Bob Geldof) (1996) - IRE #1
- "Christmas Tree" (1996)
- "Mary" (feat. Mary Robinson) (1997)
- "Good Lookin' Woman" (with Joe Dolan) (1997) - IRE #1
- "Fairytale of New York" (with Dervla Kirwan) (1997)
- "32 Counties" (1999) - IRE #1
- "Christmas in Dublin"
- "Sweet Caroline" (2001) - IRE #1
- "Patricia the Stripper" (with Chris de Burgh) (2005) - IRE #3
- "True Christmas"
- "Fields of Athenry"
- "Harrell Is a Lonely Dustin"
- "Irelande Douze Pointe" (2008) - IRE #5

=== Eurosong and Eurovision Song Contest 2008 ===
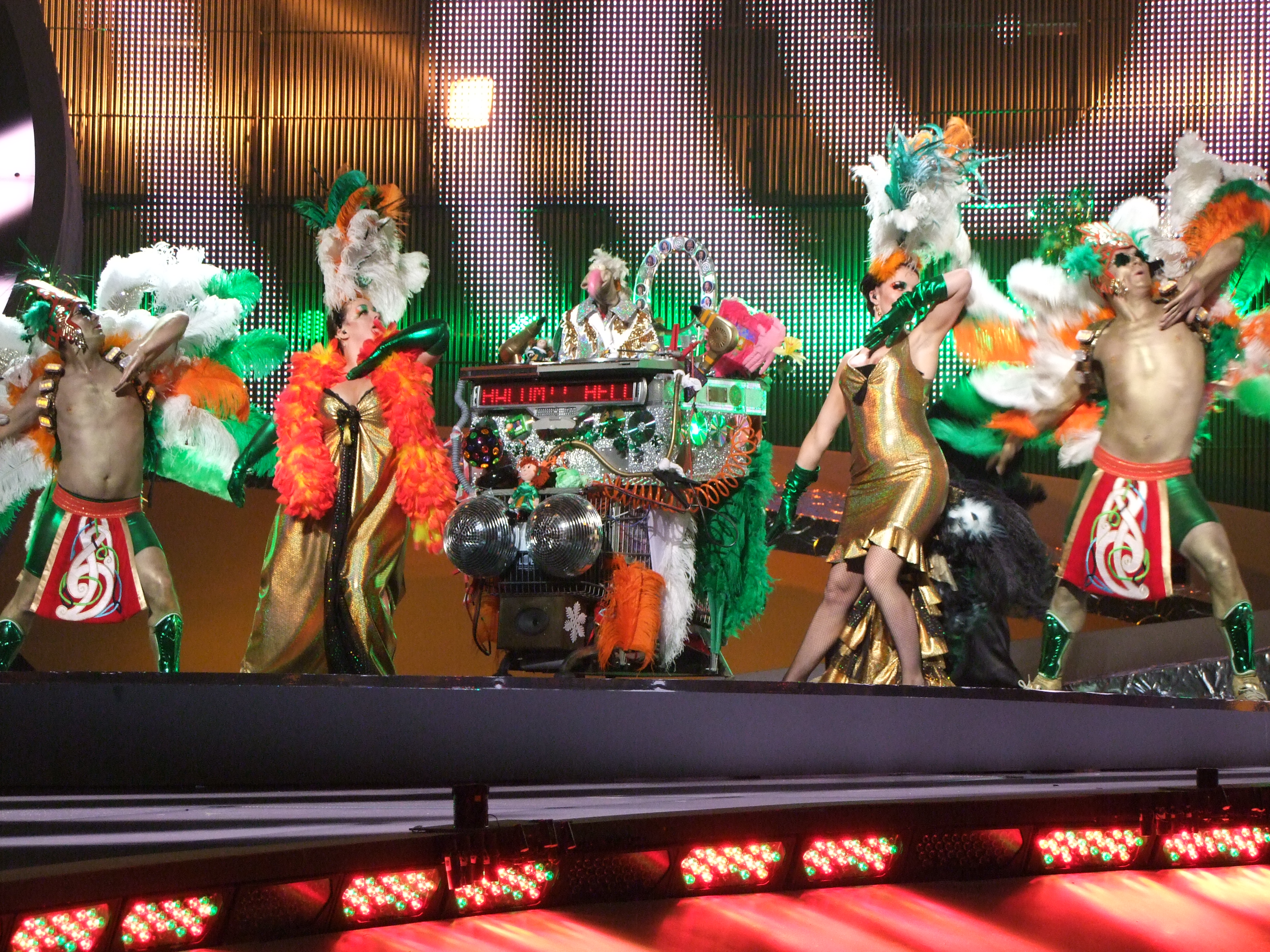
Dustin the Turkey in the first semi-final of Eurovision Song Contest 2008

Originally the favourite to win, Dustin was chosen by the Irish viewers at Eurosong to represent Ireland in the Eurovision Song Contest 2008, becoming the first puppet to do so. Though it was not announced on the Eurosong show how many votes Dustin won, an RTÉ radio show later revealed that the second place had an average of 15 points, while Dustin had 23, so the public really did want to send a puppet to Eurovision. Despite it being a public vote, there was a mixed reaction from the live studio audience when the result was announced, including many audible boos. A panellist on the programme, former Eurovision winner Dana, stated that Ireland would be better withdrawing from the competition than sending Dustin. Despite her lack of support, past Irish Eurovision entries Dickie Rock and Maxi stated their beliefs that Dustin could win.

Dustin performed his song in the first semi-final on 20 May. The song contained, among other things, references to Riverdance ("Give us another chance, we're sorry for Riverdance!") and Michael Flatley ("Sure Flatley he's a yank"). Dustin failed to progress beyond the Eurovision semi-final.

== Political career ==
Dustin has often declared his interest in politics. He has campaigned in two presidential elections. He competed as Dustin Hoffman in the 1997 presidential election as both forename and surname were necessary to register. Returning officers received votes spoiled with his name in more recent elections. He received some support but many of those ballots were also spoiled. In his mock campaigns, he ran as a representative of "Fianna Fowl" (a play on Ireland's largest political party Fianna Fáil) and also of the 'Poultry Party'. His campaign manifestos have included promising "to bring the DART to Dingle", as well as making sure every young boy in Ireland got to go on a date with the Spice Girl or Pussycat Doll of their choice and industrialising all of Ireland's rural areas, while ruralising everywhere else.

His strongly-held republican views led him to publicly confront former colleagues Zig and Zag on 2Phat's 1998 Christmas Special. During the live broadcast he angrily denounced them for 'selling out to the Queen' and verbally abused both them and co-host Ray D'Arcy.

He has also led the campaign group SOLD ("Stamp Out Line Dancing").

He is a UNICEF ambassador.

== Other appearances ==
Dustin made a film titled Dustin in Fowl Play in 2002. In this film, he and his friend, Snotser, put together a boy band called Mankind featuring band members Simon Murphy, Paul Barry, Ronan McDonald, John McCall and Chris Miller. In 2008, he made an appearance on British ITV show The Xtra Factor.

Dustin has starred in several pantomimes, including Rockinson Crusoe (1997), Rockin Hood - Prince of Babes (1998), Puss in Boots...The Cat's Tale (1999), Cinderella (2000), Dustin and Soky's Big Little Panto (2001), Cinderella (2012), Freezin: The Story of the Snow Queen (2015), The Ugly Sisters and Yer Wan (2016), and Polly and the Beanstalk (2017).

In 2009, Dustin was the subject of the documentary Dustin: 20 Years a Pluckin'.

In June 2012, he made an appearance on The Late Late Show 50th anniversary special.

He presented the TV3 toy show with Lucy Kennedy on 2 December 2016.

Dustin the Turkey has been an Ambassador for UNICEF Ireland since late 2009 and visited the KwaZulu-Natal province of South Africa, where he found out at firsthand the impact of HIV/AIDS on communities and children and ways that UNICEF is working to help very young children cope.

In May 2023, Dustin the Turkey made an appearance in the first semi-final of Eurovision Song Contest 2023 in Liverpool, England.

In September 2025, Dustin made an appearance in an advertisement for Chadwick's builders' providers, alongside comedian Joe McGucken and Boxer Jack Marley.

Awards and achievements
| Preceded by Dervish with "They Can't Stop The Spring" | Ireland in the Eurovision Song Contest; 2008 | Succeeded by Sinéad Mulvey and Black Daisy with "Et Cetera" |
