= 2003 in Ireland =

- Centuries: 19th; 20th; 21st
- Decades: 1980s; 1990s; 2000s; 2010s; 2020s
- See also: 2003 in Northern Ireland; Other events of 2003; List of years in Ireland

Events from the year 2003 in Ireland.

== Incumbents ==
- President: Mary McAleese
- Taoiseach: Bertie Ahern (FF)
- Tánaiste: Mary Harney (PD)
- Minister for Finance: Charlie McCreevy (FF)
- Chief Justice: Ronan Keane
- Dáil: 29th
- Seanad: 22nd

== Events ==
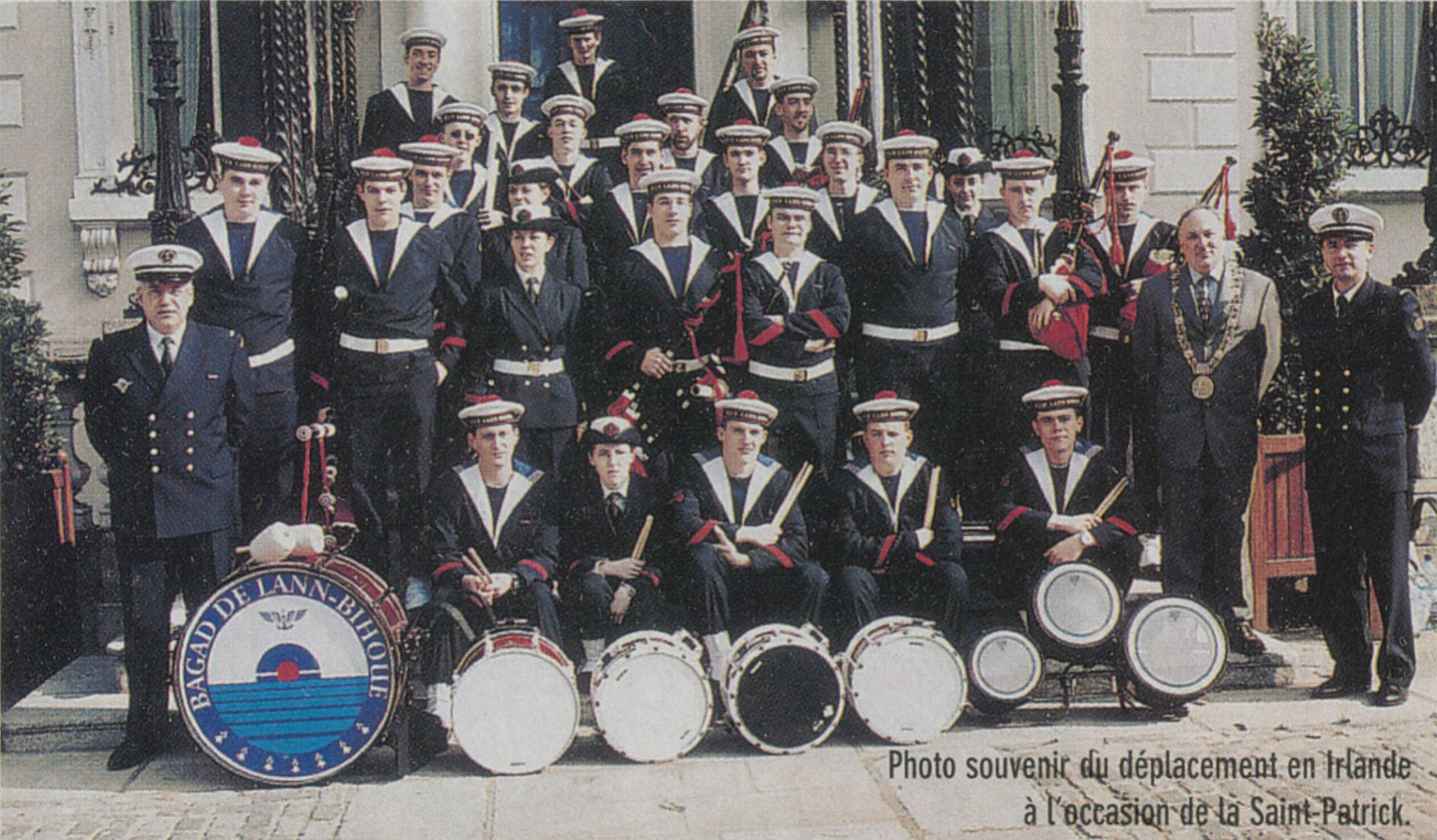
Bagad Lann Bihoue in Ireland in March 2003

- 21 January – The Spire of Dublin on O'Connell Street was completed.
- 16 February – One hundred thousand people in Dublin, and 30,000 in Belfast marched to express their opposition to the imminent invasion of Iraq.
- 7 April – President George W. Bush of the United States arrived in Northern Ireland for discussions with UK Prime Minister, Tony Blair. He also met Taoiseach Bertie Ahern, and the leaders of the pro-agreement parties.
- 21 June – The 2003 Special Olympics World Summer Games were opened by the former President of South Africa, Nelson Mandela, in Croke Park, Dublin.
- 31 August – The remains of Belfast mother Jean McConville were found 31 years after she was abducted and murdered by the Provisional IRA, who accused her of being a British Army agent.
- 15 September – For the first time, the All-Ireland Football Final was contested by two teams from the same province. Tyrone were victorious over Armagh in the first All-Ulster Final.
- 31 October – The 2003 Derrybrien landslide occurred on the side of Cashlaundrumlahan, a hill near Derrybrien in County Galway. It was focused around turbine 68 in the Derrybrien wind farm, and disrupted further construction.
- 27 November – The people of Northern Ireland went to the polls. The Democratic Unionist Party and Sinn Féin made massive gains at the expense of more moderate unionist and nationalist parties.

== Arts and literature ==
- May – Claire Kilroy's debut novel All Summer was published.
- 20 May – Mark O'Rowe's play Crestfall premièred at the Gate Theatre, Dublin.
- 25 November – The contents of Lissadell House in County Sligo were auctioned.
- December – The tree-planting amaptocare public art project in Ballymun was launched.
- Hugo Hamilton's memoir The Speckled People was published.
- Paul Murray's comic novel An Evening of Long Goodbyes was published.
- My Name Is Red by Orhan Pamuk won the International Dublin Literary Award.

== Sport ==
=== Association football ===
- The League of Ireland moved from a predominantly winter season to a Scandinavian-style summer season. Bohemians won the transitional 2002/03 season and Shelbourne won the 2003 championship.

=== Gaelic games ===
- All-Ireland Hurling Final – Kilkenny 1–14, Cork 1–11.
- All-Ireland Football Final – Tyrone 0–12, Armagh 0–9.

=== Golf ===
- Nissan Irish Open was won by Michael Campbell (New Zealand).

=== Rugby union ===
- Rugby World Cup – Ireland reached the quarter-finals of the competition before being beaten by France.
- 2003 Six Nations Championship: Ireland lost only to England, who won the tournament with a grand slam.
- 2002–03 Heineken Cup: Munster and Leinster advanced from the pool stage and both were defeated in the semi-finals. The final was played in Lansdowne Road.

== Births ==
- 14 March – Sean Roughan, footballer
- 16 May – Louise Little, cricketer
- 6 June – Johnny Kenny, footballer
- 7 November – Lara McDonnell, actress

== Deaths ==
January to June
8 January – Patrick Pery, 6th Earl of Limerick, peer and public servant (born 1930).
21 January – Tony O'Malley, painter (born 1913).
23 January – Aodhagán Brioscú, last surviving founder of Irish cultural organisation Gael Linn.
29 January – Mary Reid, one of the "Irish of Vincennes", falsely arrested in France on terrorism charges.
16 February – Seán Ó Cionnaith, Workers' Party politician (born 1938).
25 February – Tom O'Higgins, barrister and judge, Chief Justice, Fine Gael TD and twice defeated Irish presidential candidate (born 1916).
11 March – Brian Cleeve, writer and television broadcaster (born 1921).
17 March – Linda Kavanagh, Workers' Party activist and Dublin City Council member.
2 April – Pat Leavy, actress.
6 April – Ian Malone, member of British Army's Irish Guards, shot dead in Iraq (born 1974).
28 May – James Plunkett, novelist, author of Strumpet City. (born 1920).
30 June – Constance Smith, actress (born 1928).
July to September
16 July – James Kelly, former Irish Army officer cleared of attempting to import arms for the IRA in the 1970 Arms Trial (born 1929).
17 July – Eamonn Leahy, barrister and husband of Cabinet Minister Mary Hanafin.
28 July – Valerie Goulding, former Senator and campaigner for the disabled (born 1918).
3 August – Phil Monahan, founder of Monarch Properties Holdings Limited, leaving an estate worth €26.7 million.
12 August – Kieran Kelly, jump jockey after a racing accident (born 1978).
14 August – Donal Lamont, former Catholic Bishop in Rhodesia (born 1911).
19 August – Dennis Flynn, soldier in Canada, Chairman of the Municipality of Metropolitan Toronto (born 1923)
20 September – Liam Tobin, longtime Árd Rúnaí Roinn na Gaeltachta and Irish language campaigner
24 September – Tomás MacGabhann, trade unionist and Irish language activist
28 September – Proinsias Mac Aonghusa, journalist, broadcaster, chairman Bord na Gaeilge, president Conradh na Gaeilge (born 1933).
October to December
7 October – Frank Roe, former President of the Circuit Court.
16 October – Ernest Bodell, cricketer (born 1928).
10 December – Sean McClory, actor (born 1924).
12 December – John McConnell, economics expert, journalist and civil servant.
27 December – Patrick J. Reynolds, Fine Gael TD and Senator (born 1920).
30 December – Archbishop Michael Courtney Papal Nuncio to Burundi who was assassinated.
31 December – Gerald Goldberg, lawyer, Fianna Fáil politician and first Jewish Lord Mayor of Cork (born 1912).

== See also ==
- 2003 in Irish television
