= 2008 Kerry bog slides =

2008 series of bogslides in County Kerry, Ireland

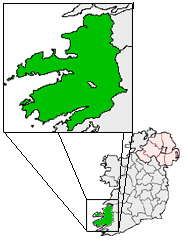
The bogslide happened in County Kerry, Ireland.

The Kerry bog slides natural disaster occurred in the Maghanknockane area of Lyrecrompane, County Kerry, Ireland in August and September 2008. The original bogslide extended over four kilometres on 22 and 23 August destroying an estimated 10 hectares (25 acres) of bog, engulfing two bridges and led to the closure of a section of road; it was reported that it could take anything up to six months to fix the road. The plot of land owned by Moss Moore which inspired John B. Keane's play The Field escaped the disaster by only a couple of kilometres. Comparisons were drawn with the occurrence of an earthquake as it was claimed that a 30-metre (98-foot) wide section was missing from the hill. The event was likened to the 2003 Derrybrien landslide in County Galway.

A second bogslide occurred on 3 September 2008, blamed on heavy rain overnight which led to a "small slippage" of bog material. The slippage happened between two bridges, Harris and Scanlon, on a tributary of the Smerlagh River and again forced the closure of a local road.

== Effects ==
Kerry County Council officials spent an entire day creating diversions to stop the flow of peat from the first bogslide. A dam was created to direct the bogslide away from the path of a river. Up to 30,000 people in north Kerry were left without a water supply due to polluted watercourses and threatened reservoirs. A boil notice was placed on the local water supply. Several homes in a rural area between Tralee and Castleisland were cut off.

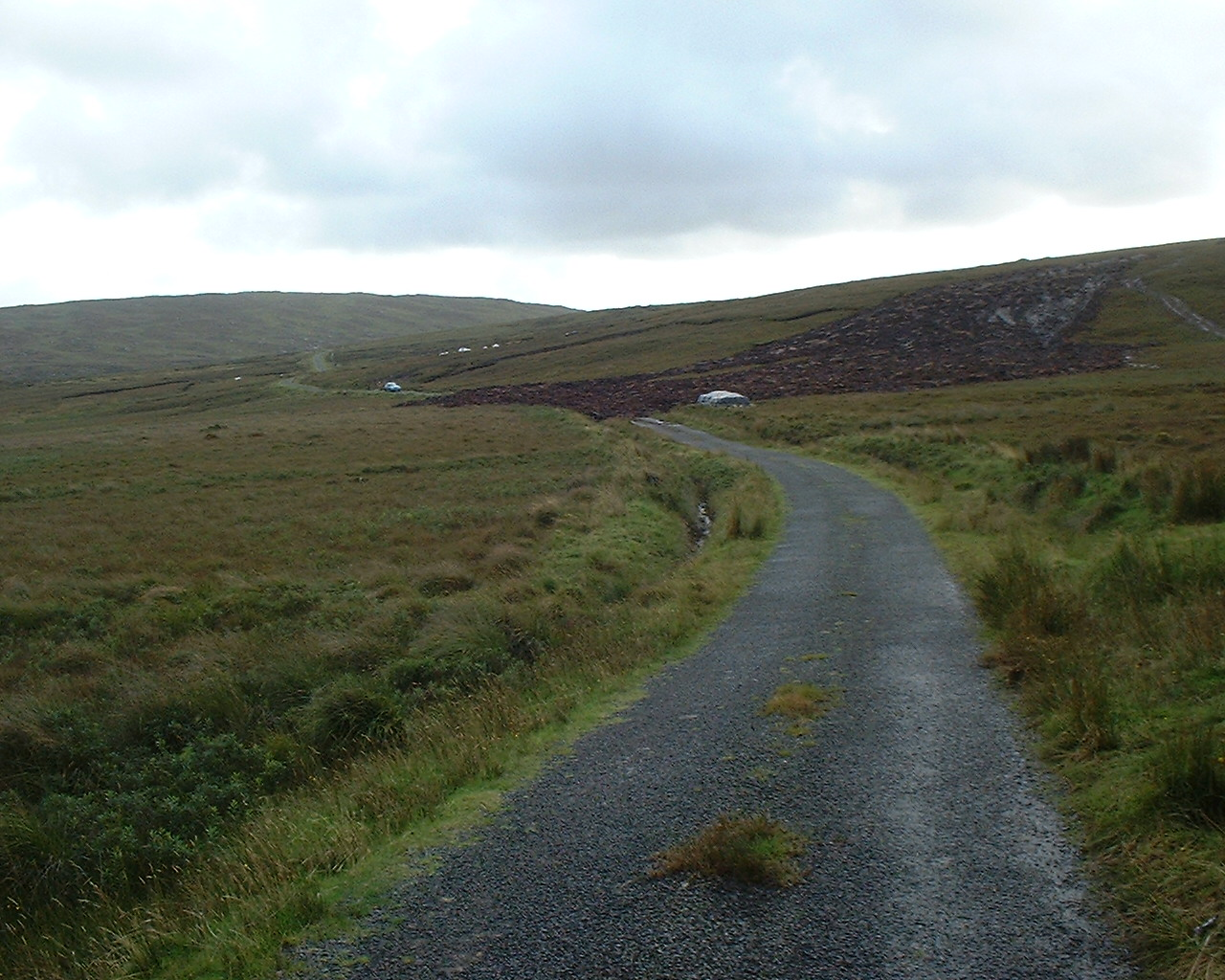
A bogslide in Donegal

One environmental effect of the bogslide was a serious fish kill on the River Smearlagh. Thousands of "mature and juvenile" trout and salmon were killed in peat which had travelled over two miles (3.2 km) and was at a depth of eight to ten feet. Shannon Regional Fisheries Board officer, Lorraine O’Donnell, claimed that it could take "up to a decade" for the river and the spawning grounds to recover. Fisheries officers were unable to access to a tributary of the river, the Glashoreag. It was completely overwhelmed by the slide. The area was an important nursery for salmon and eels before the disaster.

Maurice Harrington and his wife Joan would normally have been collecting bags of turf but escaped from the disaster unharmed. Maurice's son, Mossie, first noticed the bog moving the day before. Maurice's other son, Patrick, assumed the bog movement he witnessed was due to poor eyesight. Maurice lost over €1,000 worth of turf in the disaster. Joan and Patrick moved out the next week.

== Possible cause ==
Residents in the area said that machinery on the site of a wind farm on nearby Ballincollig Hill might have contributed to the bogslide which was caused by heavy rain. Work had begun on the site two weeks prior to the disaster. Local residents had expressed concern about the possible risk of a landslide as far back as 2001 when initial planning permission was sought by Tralee-based Trá Investments for the windfarm. In July 2004 several people wrote to EU Commissioner for the Environment, Margot Wallström, to voice their concerns about the threat to protected birds of prey should the windfarm development proceed. With their objections over-ruled, the development was approved by An Bord Pleanála in June 2004. Trá Investments is to carry out an independent inquiry into the cause of the disaster.

== Bog slides in literature ==
Threatened by development, the peat bog that plays a starring role in The Curse of the Wise Woman, a 1933 novel by Lord Dunsany, flips over completely.

Not truly a slide, but a rise and fall in the volume size of a natural bog swallowing up the road to and from a home on an island called Eel Marsh House takes place in the novel and all adaptations of Susan Hill's work, The Woman in Black.
