= Bodell =

Bodell may refer to:

== People ==
- Ernest Bodell (1928–2003), cricketer
- Jack Bodell (1940–2016), boxer
- James Bodell (c. 1831–1892), New Zealand soldier, businessman, local politician, and writer
- Norman Bodell (1938–2024), English professional footballer, coach, manager, and scout

== Places ==
- Bodell River, a river in Northeastern Ontario, Canada
