= 2003 in Irish television =

The following is a list of events relating to television in Ireland from 2003.

== Events ==
=== January ===
- January – Stories from the Twin Towers, a documentary about the September 11 terrorist attacks by RTÉ News journalists Caroline Bleahan and Jim Fahy wins the Gold World Medal for top 11 September documentary at The New York Festival's 45th annual Television Programming Awards.
- 22 January – The children's news bulletin news2day debuts on Network 2's The Den.

=== March ===
- 3 March – Tara Television, a cable and satellite channel that airs RTÉ programmes to the United Kingdom goes into liquidation.

=== May ===
- 7 May – RTÉ publishes its first annual Statement of Commitments.

=== June ===
- 13 June – Cabin Fever, RTÉ's "Reality TV" ship sinks. It had started on 1 June, and was scheduled to run for eight weeks, but was cancelled following the disaster.

=== July ===
- 3 July – Cathal Goan is appointed Director-General of RTÉ.
- 16 July – RTÉ publishes a Code of Fair Trading Practice.

=== September ===
- September – "RTÉ News" is merged with "RTÉ Current Affairs" to form "RTÉ News and Current Affairs".

=== November ===
- 1 November – The first annual Irish Film and Television Awards are held. The ceremony is hosted by actor James Nesbitt.
- 20 November – RTÉ Audience Council announced.

=== Unknown ===
- Broadcasting fund established.
- An overhaul of RTÉ's internal structure creates new Integrated Business Divisions for Television, Radio, News, Publishing, Network and Performing Groups.
- Video self-editing becomes fully operational enabling RTÉ journalists to use videophone technology when filing reports from overseas. Clipmail is used to send a report from Liberia.

== Debuts ==
=== RTÉ ===
- 6 January – Yu-Gi-Oh! on RTÉ Two (1998–2006)
- 7 January – Kangaroo Creek Gang on RTÉ Two (2002)
- 20 January – Fimbles on RTÉ Two (2002–2003)
- 22 January – news2day on RTÉ Two (2003–present)
- February – Against the Head on RTÉ Two (2003–present)
- 13 February – Engie Benjy on RTÉ Two (2002–2004)
- 15 April – Preston Pig on RTÉ Two (2000)
- 15 April – Rubbadubbers on RTÉ Two (2002–2004)
- 29 April – Stuart Little on RTÉ Two (2002–2003)
- 13 May – Viva S Club on RTÉ Two (2002)
- 4 June – Beyblade on RTÉ Two (2001–2005)
- 24 July – Play it Again Des on RTÉ One (2003–2005)
- 1 September – All Kinds of Everything on RTÉ One (2003–2004)
- 15 September – The Panel on RTÉ Two (2003–2011)
- 17 September – Teenage Mutant Ninja Turtles on RTE Two (2003–2010)
- 19 September – Max & Ruby on RTÉ Two (2002–present)
- September – Auld Ones on RTÉ Two (2003–2007)
- September – Kim Possible on RTÉ Two (2002–2007)
- 2 October – Make Way for Noddy on RTÉ Two (2002–2003)
- 12 October – The Clinic on RTÉ One (2003–2009)
- 10 November – Fetch the Vet on RTÉ Two (2000–2001)
- 30 December – Killinaskully on RTÉ One (2003–2008)
- Undated – Other Voices on RTÉ Two (2003–present)
- Undated – Life with Bonnie (2002–2004)

=== TV3 ===
- 8 January – Beyond Belief: Fact or Fiction (1997–2002)
- 23 April – The Tick (2001–2002)
- 5 September – The Dunphy Show (2003)

=== TG4 ===
- 6 January – Tec the Tractor (1998–2005)
- 6 January – ¡Mucha Lucha! (2002–2005)
- 9 January – Lizzie McGuire (2001–2004)
- 3 September – Baby Looney Tunes (2001–2006)
- 1 November – Codename: Kids Next Door (2002–2008)
- Undated – 7 Lá (2003)

== Changes of network affiliation ==
Shows	Moved from	Moved to
Mona the Vampire	TV3	RTÉ Two
The Animals of Farthing Wood	RTÉ One	RTÉ Two
The Den	RTÉ One	RTÉ Two
Barney & Friends	RTÉ One	RTÉ Two
Arthur	TG4	RTÉ Two
Bear in the Big Blue House	RTÉ One	RTÉ Two
Top Cat	RTÉ Two	TG4
The Morbegs	RTÉ One	RTÉ Two
Pecola	RTÉ One	RTÉ Two
Tom and Jerry	RTÉ Two	TG4

== Ongoing television programmes ==
=== 1960s ===
- RTÉ News: Nine O'Clock (1961–present)
- RTÉ News: Six One (1962–present)
- The Late Late Show (1962–present)

=== 1970s ===
- The Late Late Toy Show (1975–present)
- RTÉ News on Two (1978–2014)
- The Sunday Game (1979–present)

=== 1980s ===
- Dempsey's Den (1986–2010)
- Questions and Answers (1986–2009)
- Fair City (1989–present)
- RTÉ News: One O'Clock (1989–present)

=== 1990s ===
- Would You Believe (1990s–present)
- Winning Streak (1990–present)
- Prime Time (1992–present)
- Nuacht RTÉ (1995–present)
- Fame and Fortune (1996–2006)
- Nuacht TG4 (1996–present)
- Ros na Rún (1996–present)
- A Scare at Bedtime (1997–2006)
- The Premiership/Premier Soccer Saturday (1998–2013)
- Sports Tonight (1998–2009)
- TV3 News (1998–present)
- Open House (1999–2004)
- Agenda (1999–2004)
- The View (1999–2011)
- Ireland AM (1999–present)
- Telly Bingo (1999–present)

=== 2000s ===
- Nationwide (2000–present)
- TV3 News at 5.30 (2001–present)
- You're a Star (2002–2008)

== Ending this year ==
- 12 December – The Dunphy Show (2003)
- Undated – No Disco (1993–2003)
- Undated – Patrick Kielty Almost Live (1999–2003)

== See also ==
- 2003 in Ireland
