= Iron Age Cold Epoch =

Period of unusually cold climate in the North Atlantic region

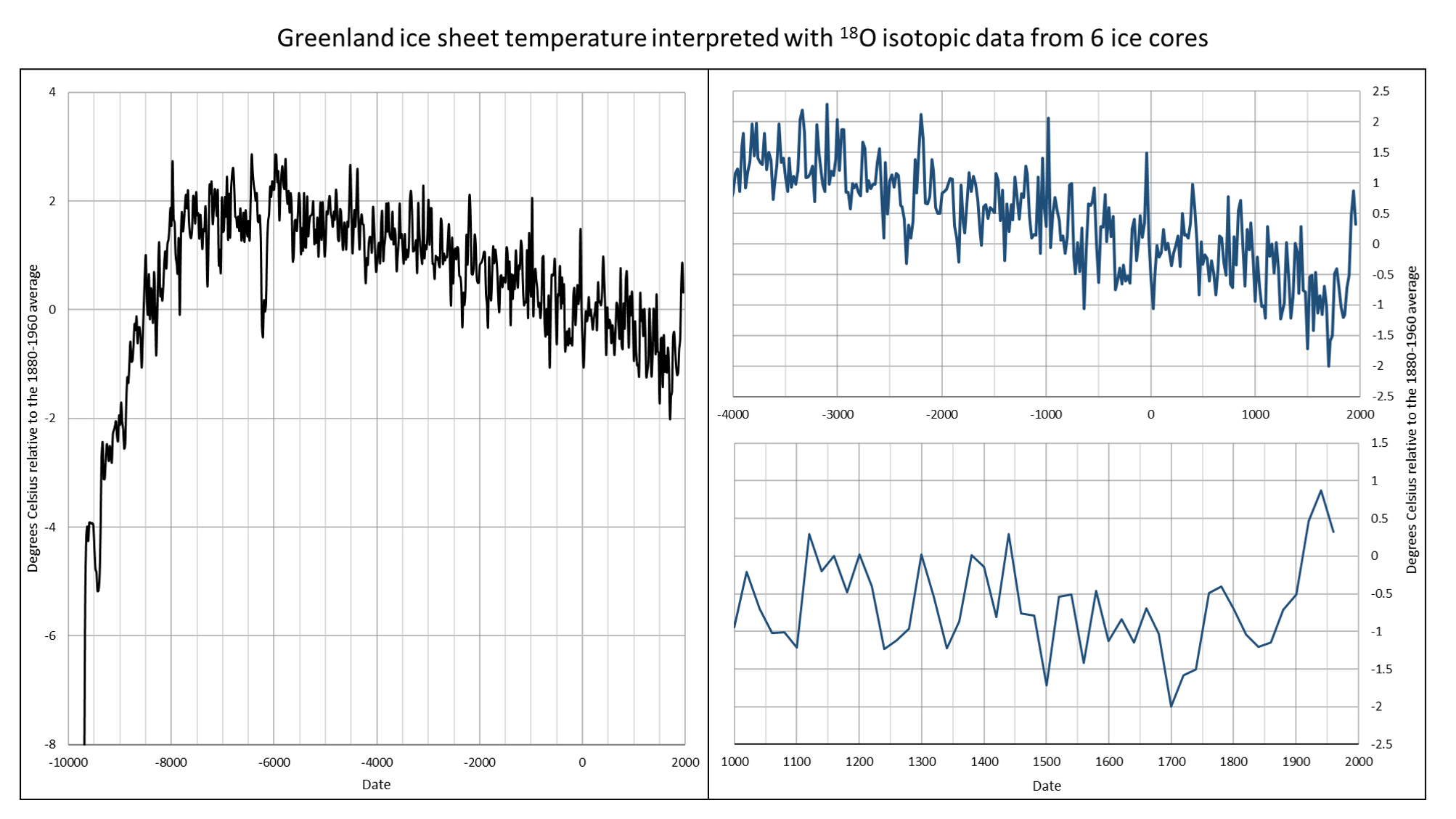
Greenland ice sheet temperatures interpreted with 18O isotope from 6 ice cores (Vinther, B., et al., 2009)

The Iron Age Cold Epoch (also referred to as Iron Age climate pessimum or Iron Age neoglaciation) was a period of unusually cold climate in the North Atlantic region, lasting from about 900 BC to about 300 BC, with an especially cold wave in 450 BC during the expansion of ancient Greece. It was followed by the Roman Warm Period (250 BC – 400 AD). Gill Plunkett and Graeme T. Swindles of Queen's University Belfast used volcanic ash layers and radiocarbon dating to constrain the start of Iron Age climate deterioration in Ireland to 750 BC.
