= Bog =

Type of wetland with peat-rich soil

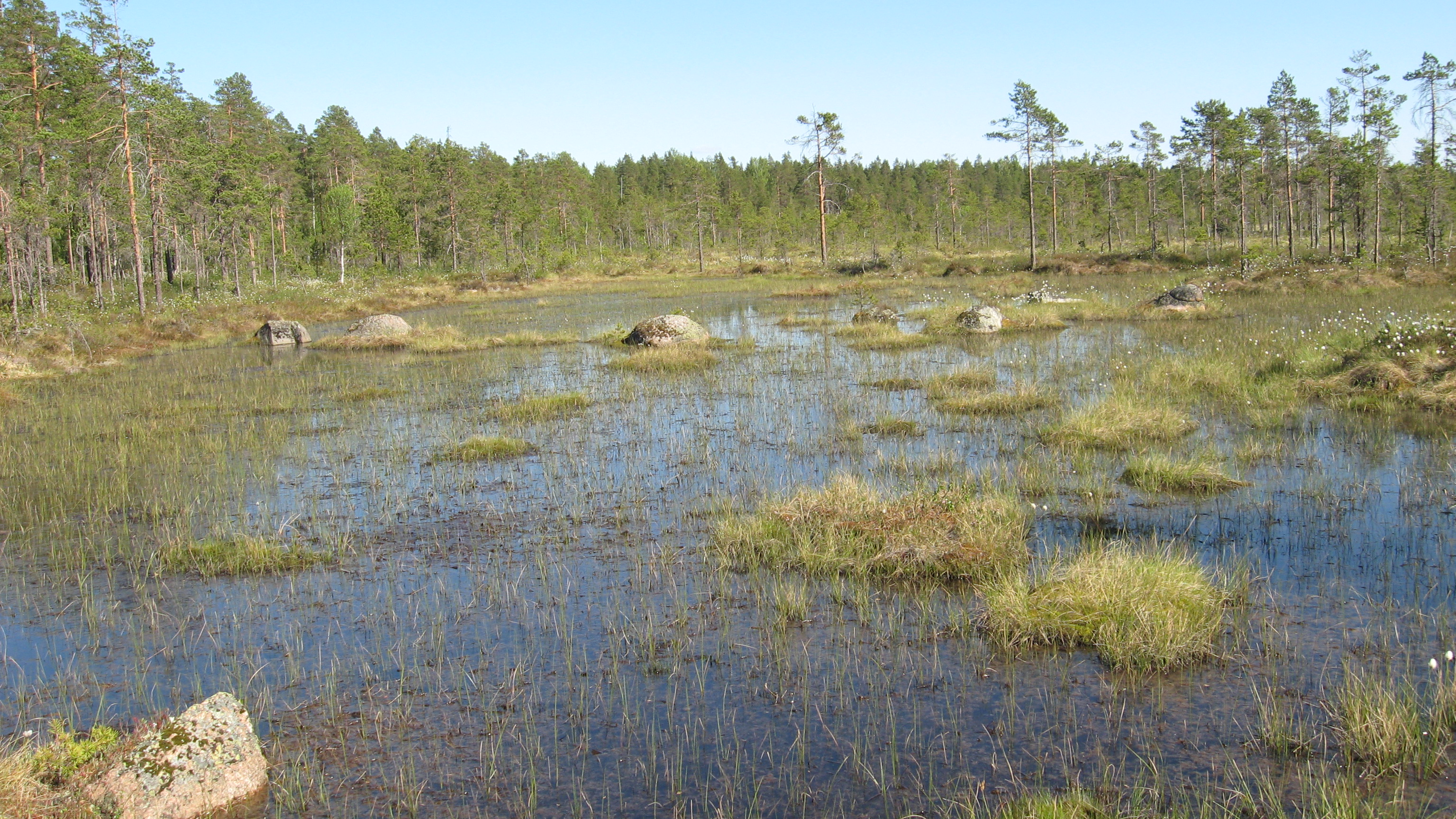
A bog in Lauhanvuori National Park, Isojoki, Finland

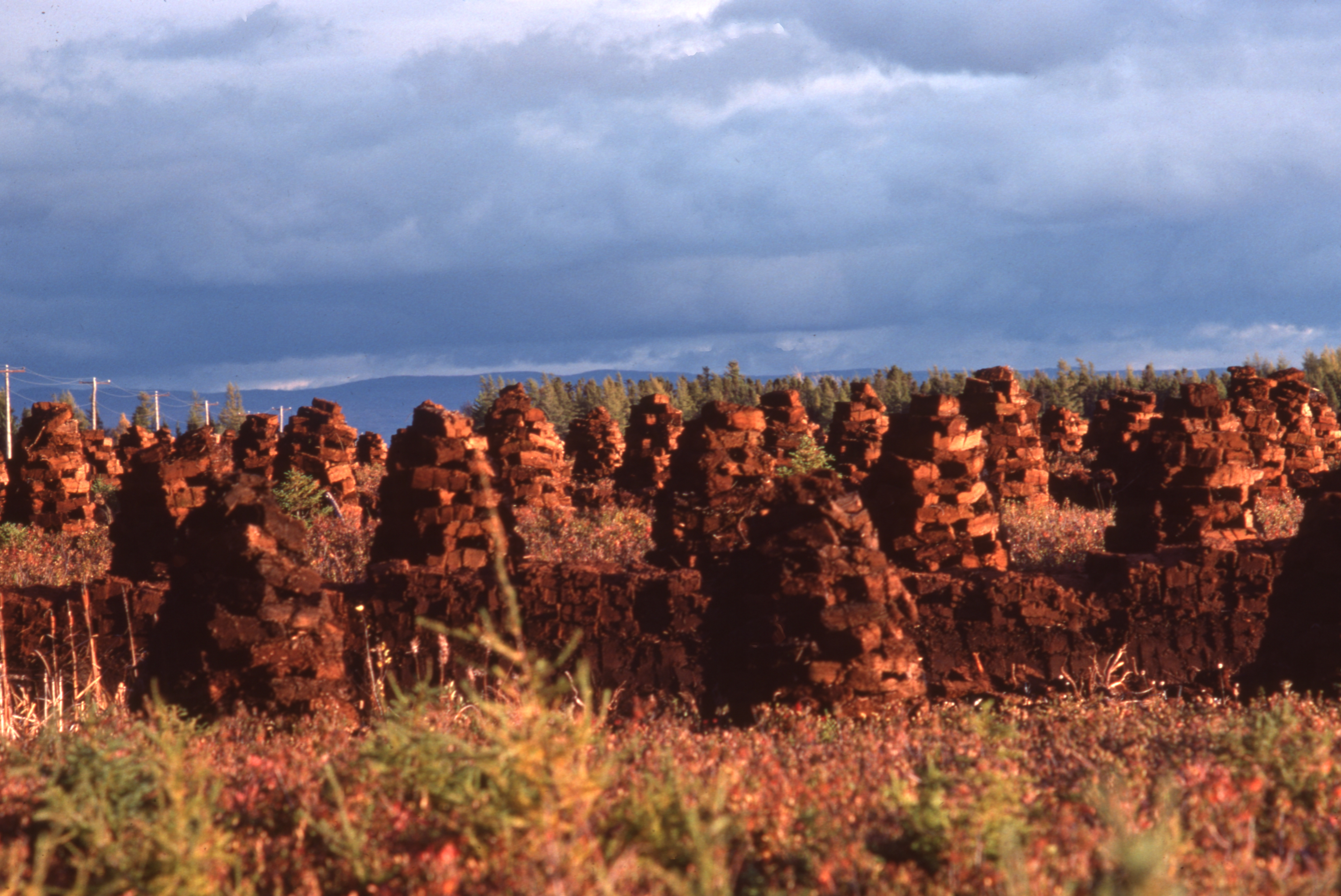
Peat bog and peat to dry, L'Isle-aux-Coudres, Quebec, Canada, 1976

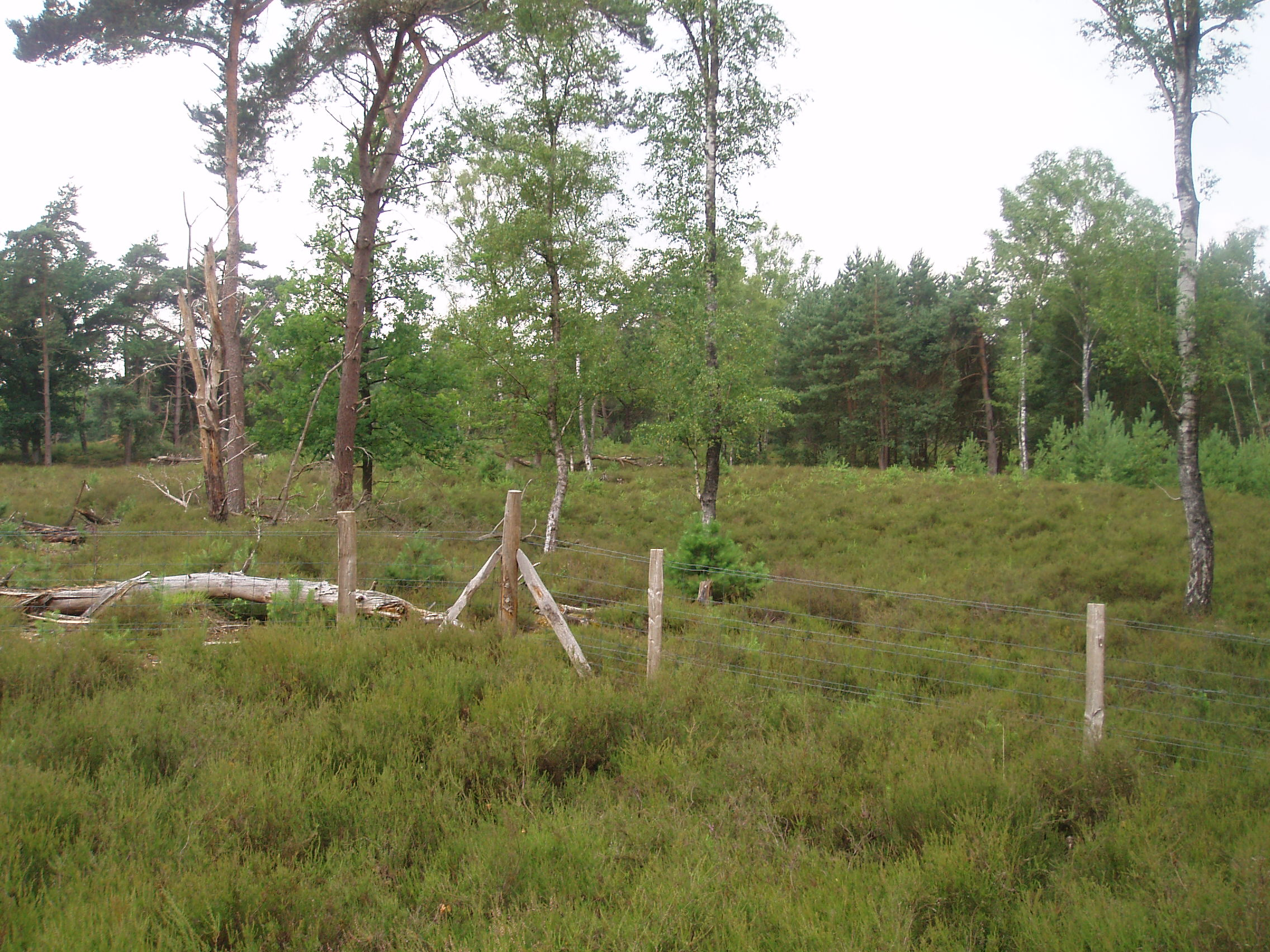
Bog in Antwerp Province, Belgium

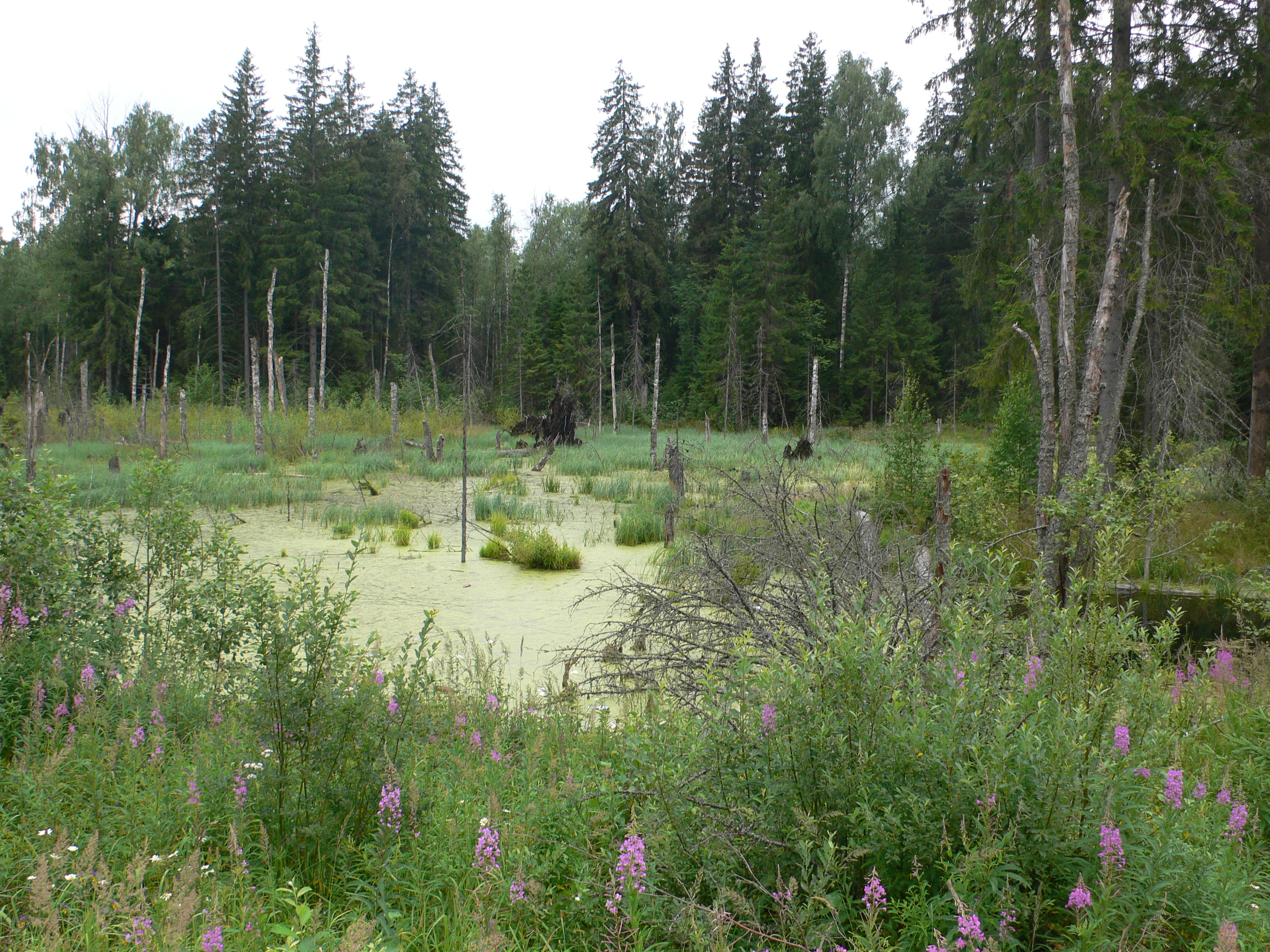
Bog in the Seliger Lake area, Tver Oblast, Russia

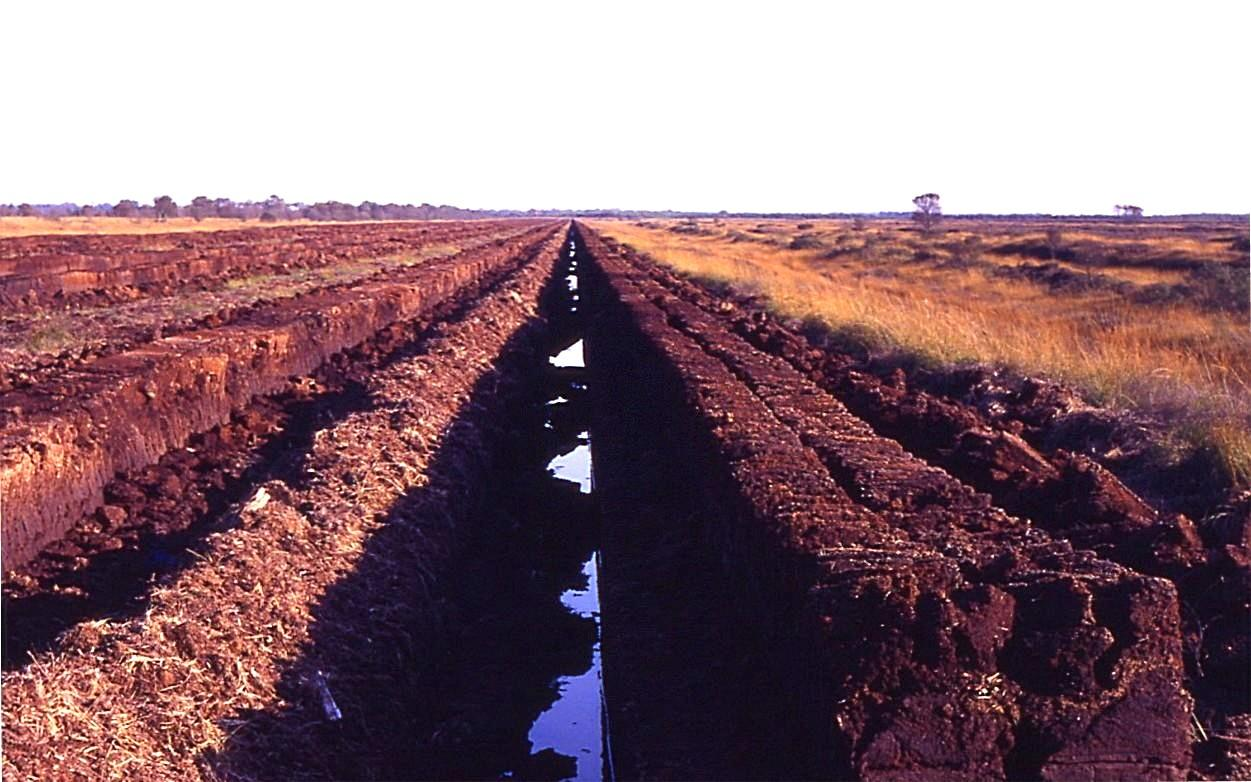
Peat extraction in East Frisia, Germany

Drone video of Kakerdaja bog in Estonia (September 2021)

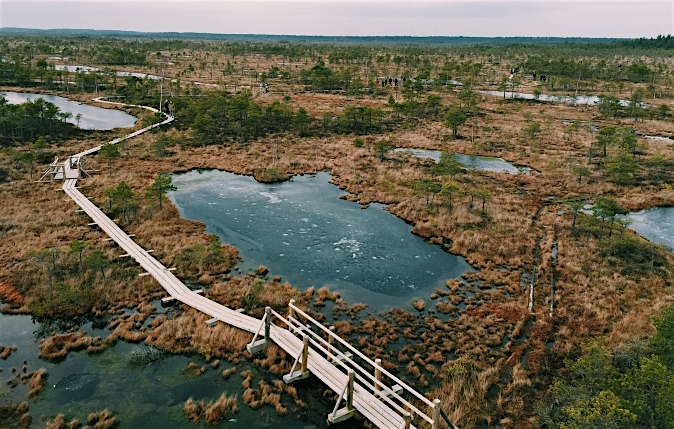
A raised bog in Ķemeri National Park, Jūrmala, Latvia, formed approximately 10,000 years ago in the postglacial period and now a tourist attraction.

A bog or bogland is a wetland that accumulates peat as a deposit of dead plant materials – often mosses, typically sphagnum moss. It is one of the four main types of wetlands. Other names for bogs include mire, mosses, quagmire, and muskeg; alkaline mires are called fens. A bayhead is another type of bog found in the forest of the Gulf Coast states in the United States. They are often covered in heath or heather shrubs rooted in the sphagnum moss and peat. The gradual accumulation of decayed plant material in a bog functions as a carbon sink.

Bogs occur where the water at the ground surface is acidic and low in nutrients. A bog usually is found at a freshwater soft spongy ground that is made up of decayed plant matter which is known as peat. They are generally found in cooler northern climates and are formed in poorly draining lake basins. In contrast to fens, they derive most of their water from precipitation rather than mineral-rich ground or surface water. Water flowing out of bogs has a characteristic brown colour, which comes from dissolved peat tannins. In general, the low fertility and cool climate result in relatively slow plant growth, but decay is even slower due to low oxygen levels in saturated bog soils. Hence, peat accumulates. Large areas of the landscape can be covered many meters deep in peat.

Bogs have distinctive assemblages of animal, fungal, and plant species, and are of high importance for biodiversity, particularly in landscapes that are otherwise settled and farmed.

== Distribution and extent ==
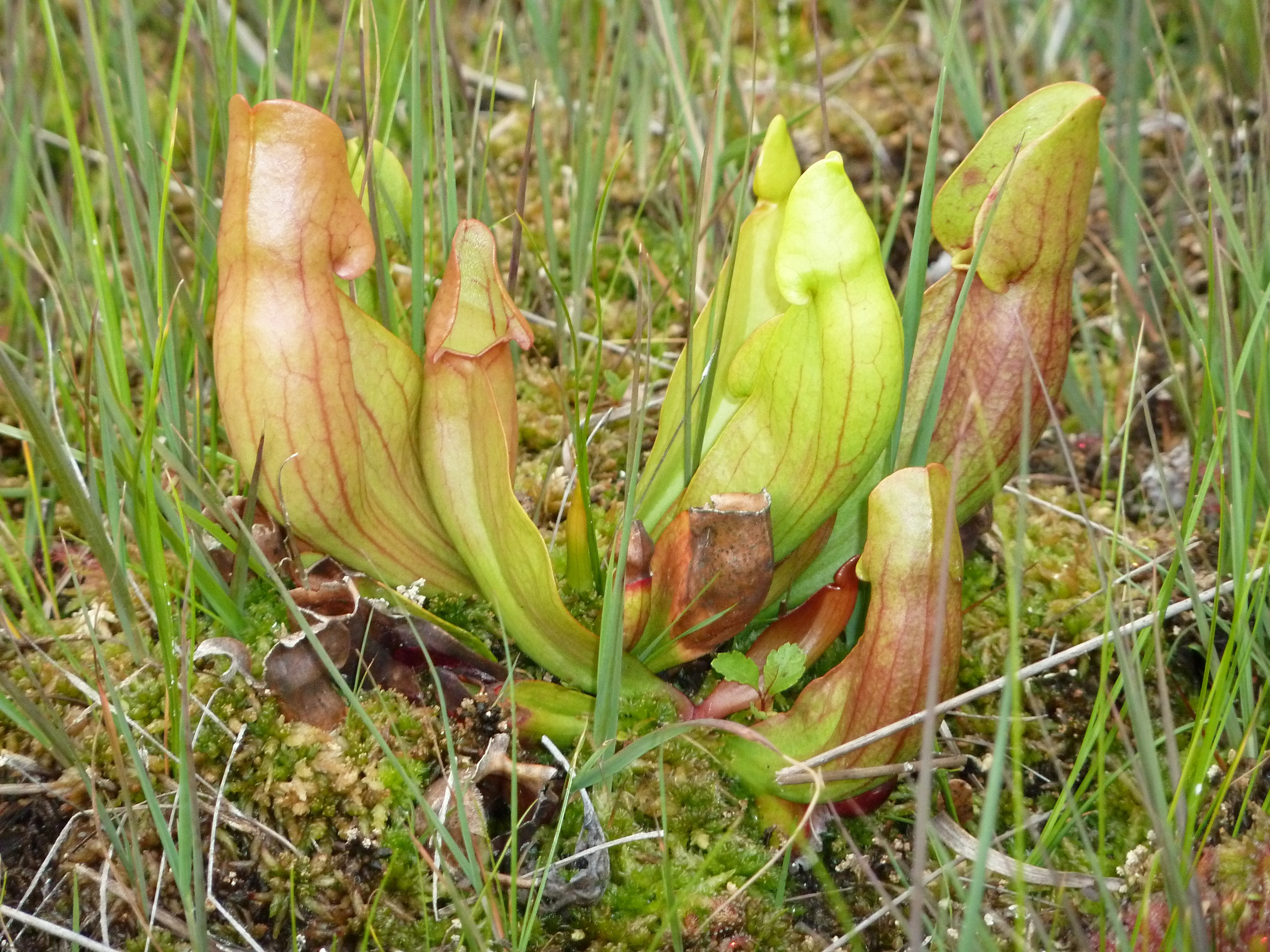
Carnivorous plants, such as this Sarracenia purpurea pitcher plant of the eastern seaboard of North America, are often found in bogs. Capturing insects provides nitrogen and phosphorus, which are usually scarce in such conditions.

Bogs are widely distributed in cold, temperate climes, mostly in boreal ecosystems in the Northern Hemisphere. The world's largest wetland is the peat bogs of the Western Siberian Lowlands in Russia, which cover more than a million square kilometres. Large peat bogs also occur in North America, particularly the Hudson Bay Lowland and the Mackenzie River Basin. They are less common in the Southern Hemisphere, with the largest being the Magellanic moorland, comprising some 44,000 square kilometres (17,000 sq mi) in southern South America. Sphagnum bogs were widespread in northern Europe but have often been cleared and drained for agriculture. A paper led by Graeme T. Swindles in 2019 showed that peatlands across Europe have undergone rapid drying in recent centuries owing to human impacts including drainage, peat cutting and burning. A 2014 expedition leaving from Itanga village, Republic of the Congo, discovered a peat bog "as big as England" which stretches into neighboring Democratic Republic of Congo. Ireland's geography was once covered in boglands prior to mass deforestation during the 1800s.

== Definition ==
Like all wetlands, it is difficult to rigidly define bogs for a number of reasons, including variations between bogs, the in-between nature of wetlands as an intermediate between terrestrial and aquatic ecosystems, and varying definitions between wetland classification systems. However, there are characteristics common to all bogs that provide a broad definition:

1. Peat is present, usually thicker than 30 centimetres (12 in).
2. The wetland receives most of its water and nutrients from precipitation (ombrotrophic) rather than surface or groundwater (minerotrophic).
3. The wetland is nutrient-poor (oligotrophic).
4. The wetland is strongly acidic (bogs near coastal areas may be less acidic due to sea spray).

Because all bogs have peat, they are a type of peatland. As a peat-producing ecosystem, they are also classified as mires, along with fens. Bogs differ from fens, in that fens receive water and nutrients from mineral-rich surface or groundwater, while bogs receive water and nutrients from precipitation. Because fens are supplied with mineral-rich water, they tend to range from slightly acidic to slightly basic, while bogs are always acidic because precipitation lacks the dissolved minerals (e.g. calcium, magnesium, carbonate) that act to buffer the natural acidity of atmospheric carbon dioxide. Geography and geology both impact the hydrology: as groundwater mineral content reflects the bedrock geology, there can be great deal of variability in some common ions (e.g. manganese, iron) while proximity to coastal areas is associated with higher sulfate and sodium concentrations.

== Ecology and protection ==
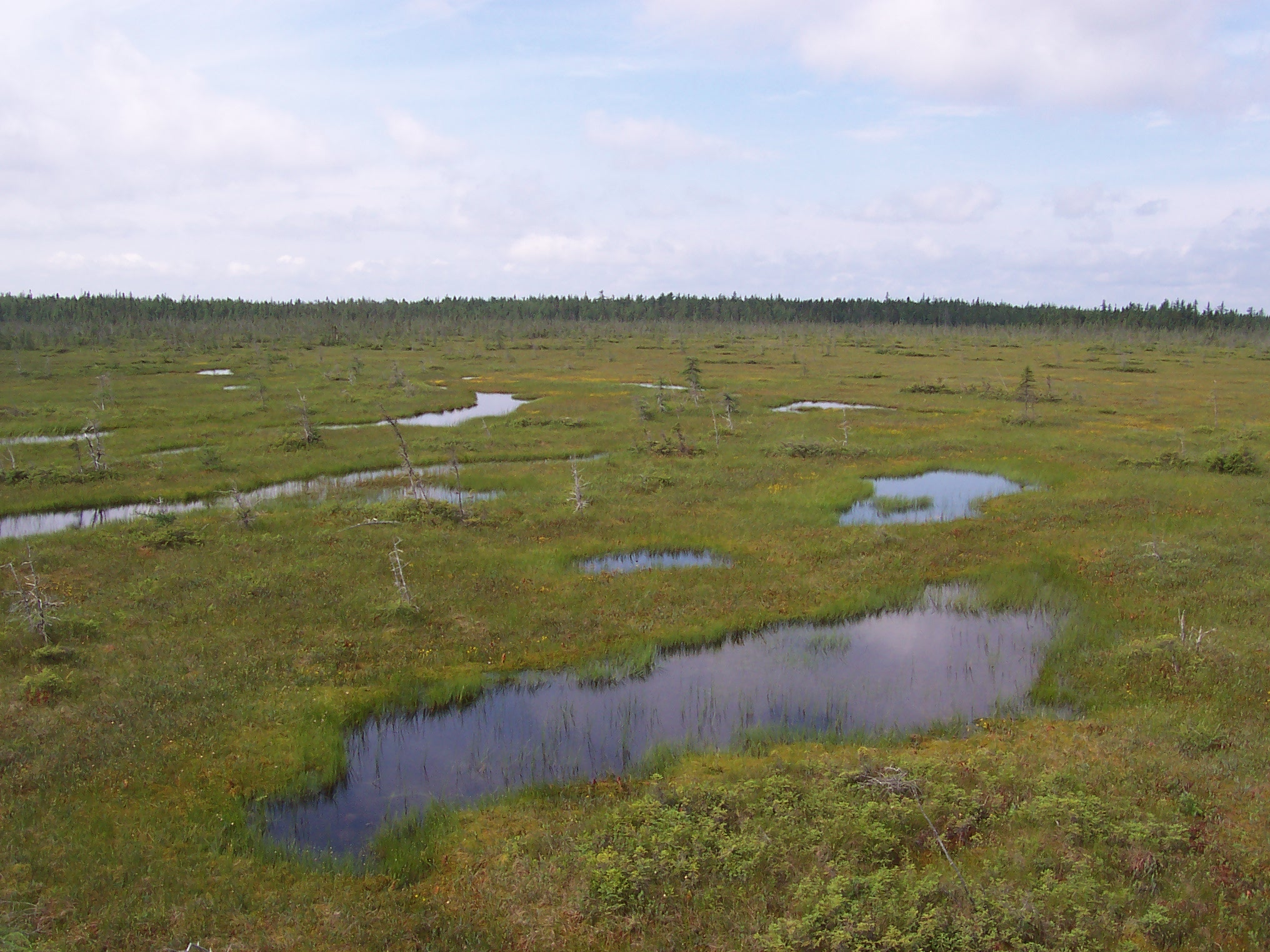
An expanse of wet Sphagnum bog in Frontenac National Park, Quebec, Canada. Spruce trees can be seen on a forested ridge in the background.

There are many highly specialized animals, fungi, and plants associated with bog habitat. Most are capable of tolerating the combination of low nutrient levels and waterlogging. Sphagnum is generally abundant, along with ericaceous shrubs. The shrubs are often evergreen, which may assist in conservation of nutrients. In drier locations, evergreen trees can occur, in which case the bog blends into the surrounding expanses of boreal evergreen forest. Sedges are one of the more common herbaceous species. Carnivorous plants such as sundews (Drosera) and pitcher plants (for example Sarracenia purpurea) have adapted to the low-nutrient conditions by using invertebrates as a nutrient source. Orchids have adapted to these conditions through the use of mycorrhizal fungi to extract nutrients. Some shrubs such as Myrica gale (bog myrtle) have root nodules in which nitrogen fixation occurs, thereby providing another supplemental source of nitrogen.

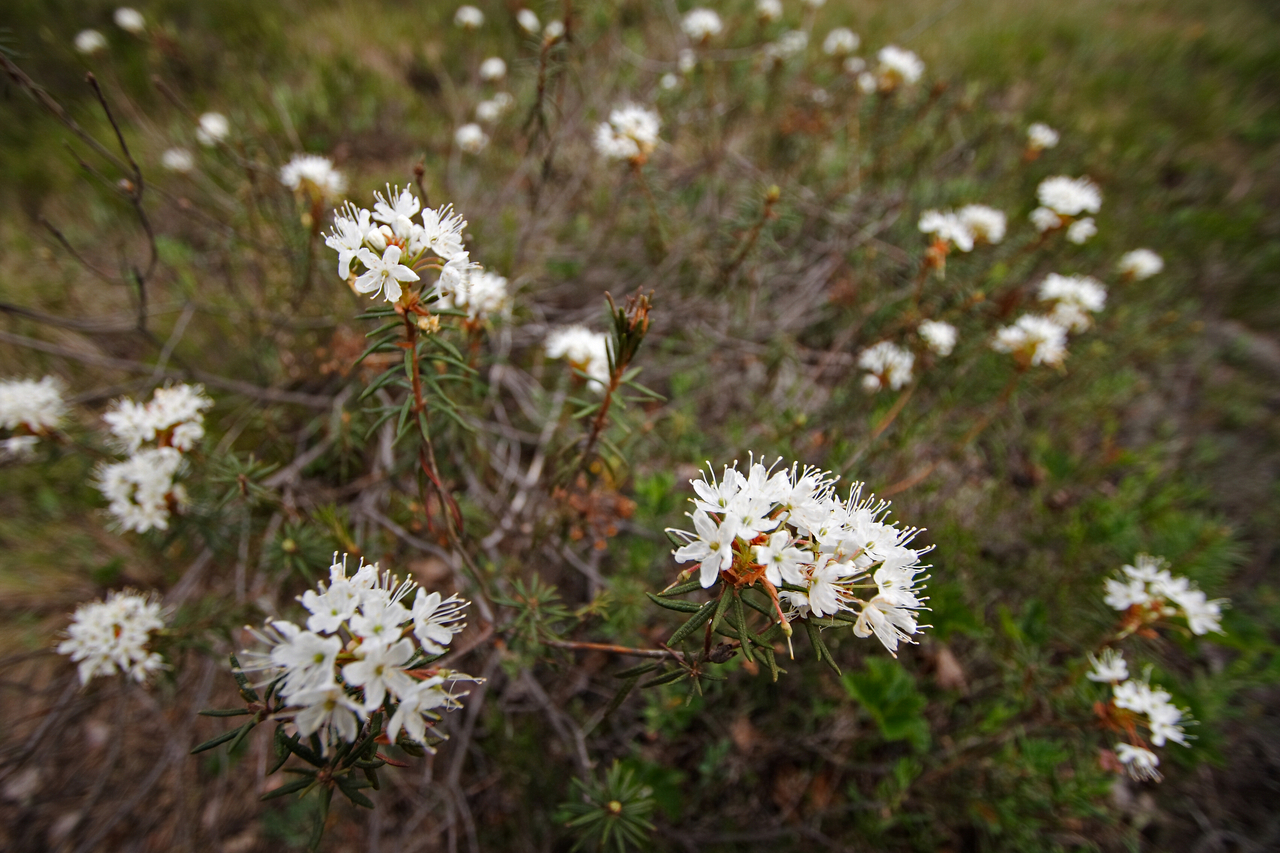
Many species of evergreen shrub are found in bogs, such as Labrador tea.

Bogs are recognized as a significant/specific habitat type by a number of governmental and conservation agencies. They can provide habitat for mammals, such as caribou, moose, and beavers, as well as for species of nesting shorebirds, such as Siberian cranes and yellowlegs. Bogs contain species of vulnerable reptilians such as the bog turtle. Bogs even have distinctive insects; English bogs give a home to a yellow fly called the hairy canary fly (Phaonia jaroschewskii), and bogs in North America are habitat for a butterfly called the bog copper (Lycaena epixanthe). In Ireland, the viviparous lizard, the only known reptile in the country, dwells in bogland.

The United Kingdom in its Biodiversity Action Plan establishes bog habitats as a priority for conservation. Russia has a large reserve system in the West Siberian Lowland. The highest protected status occurs in Zapovedniks (IUCN category IV); Gydansky and Yugansky are two prominent examples.

Bogs are fragile ecosystems, and have been deteriorating quickly, as archaeologists and scientists have been recently finding. Bone material found in bogs has had accelerated deterioration from first analyses in the 1940s. This has been found to be from fluctuations in ground water and increase in acidity in lower areas of bogs that is affecting the rich organic material. Many of these areas have been permeated to the lowest levels with oxygen, which dries and cracks layers. There have been some temporary solutions to try to fix these issues, such as adding soil to the tops of threatened areas; they do not work in the long-term. Extreme weather like dry summers are likely the cause, as they lower precipitation and the groundwater table. It is speculated that these issues will only increase with a rise in global temperature and climate change. Since bogs take thousands of years to form and create the rich peat that is used as a resource, once they are gone they are extremely hard to recover. Arctic and sub-Arctic circles where many bogs are warming at 0.6 °C per decade, an amount twice as large as the global average. Because bogs and other peatlands are carbon sinks, they are releasing large amounts of greenhouse gases as they warm up. These changes have resulted in a severe decline of biodiversity and species populations of peatlands throughout Northern Europe.

== Types ==
Bog habitats may develop in various situations, depending on the climate and topography.

=== By location and water source ===
Bogs may be classified on their topography, proximity to water, method of recharge, and nutrient accumulation.

==== Valley bog ====
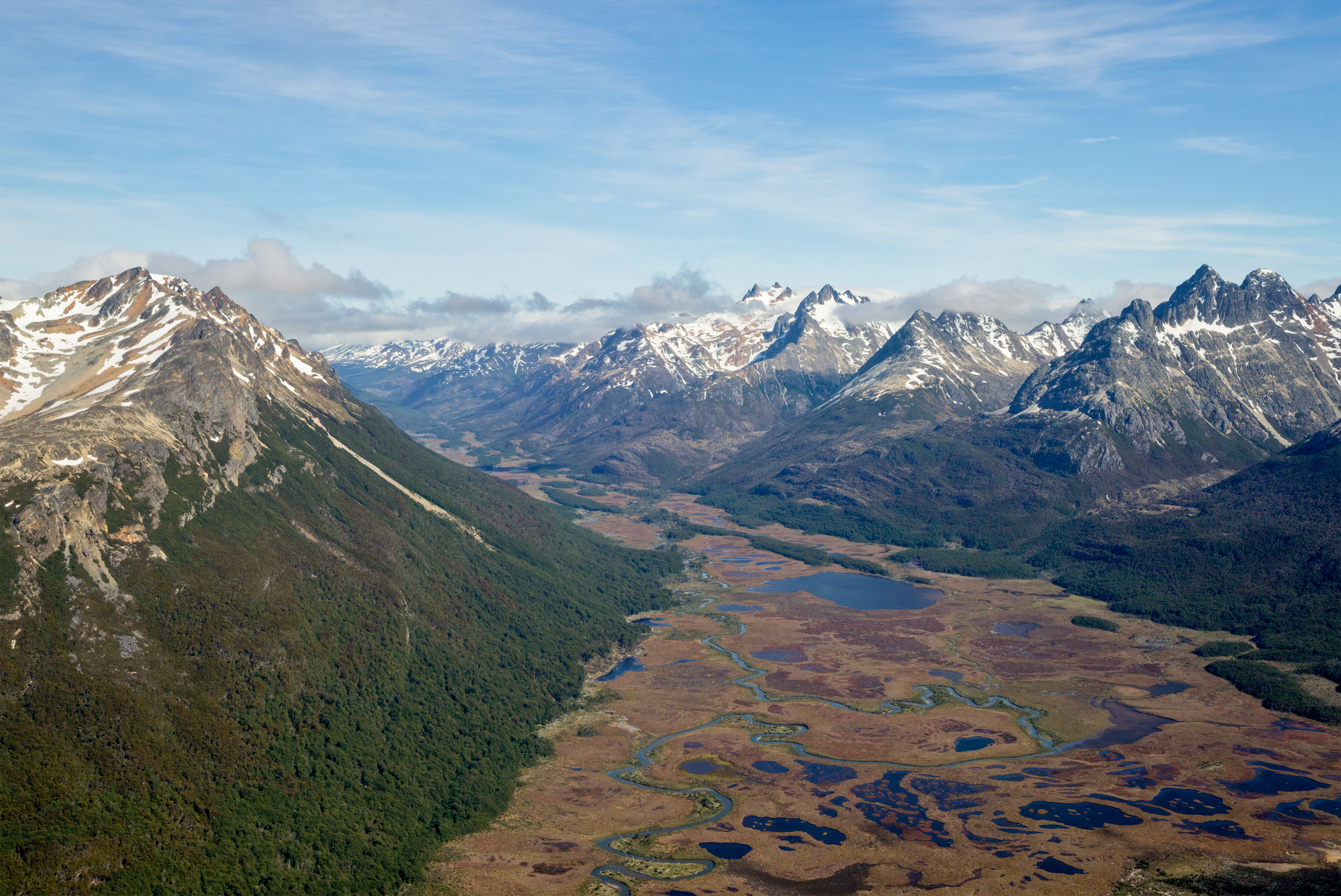
Aerial image of Carbajal Valley peat bogs, Tierra del Fuego Province, Argentina

These develop in gently sloping valleys or hollows. A layer of peat fills the deepest part of the valley, and a stream may run through the surface of the bog. Valley bogs may develop in relatively dry and warm climates, but because they rely on ground or surface water, they only occur on acidic substrates.

==== Raised bog ====
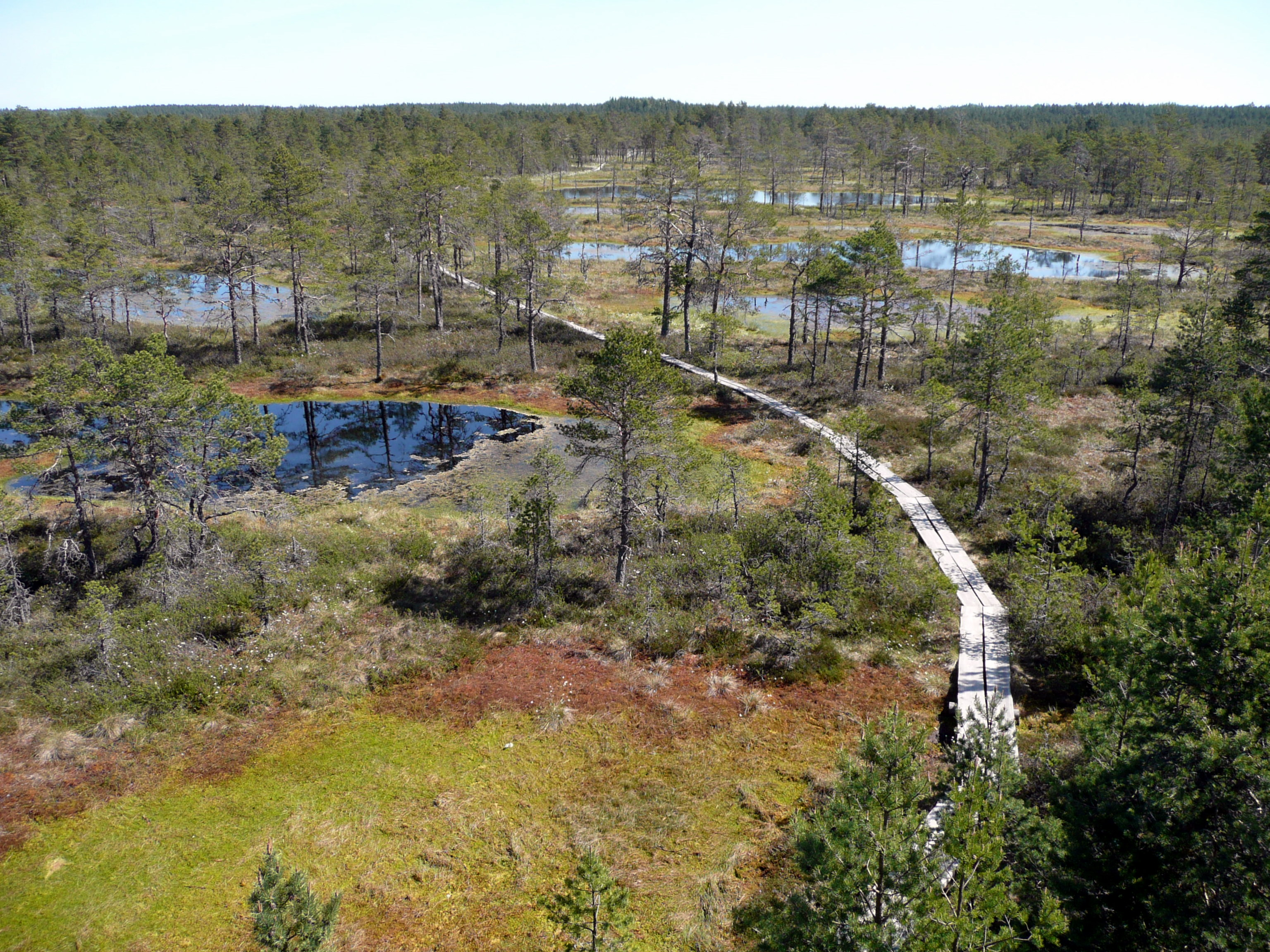
Viru Bog in Lahemaa National Park, Estonia, which is rich in raised bogs

These develop from a lake or flat marshy area, over either non-acidic or acidic substrates. Over centuries there is a progression from open lake, to a marsh, to a fen (or, on acidic substrates, valley bog), to a carr, as silt or peat accumulates within the lake. Eventually, peat builds up to a level where the land surface is too flat for ground or surface water to reach the center of the wetland. This part, therefore, becomes wholly rain-fed (ombrotrophic), and the resulting acidic conditions allow the development of bog (even if the substrate is non-acidic). The bog continues to form peat, and over time a shallow dome of bog peat develops into a raised bog. The dome is typically a few meters high in the center and is often surrounded by strips of fen or other wetland vegetation at the edges or along streamsides where groundwater can percolate into the wetland.

The various types of raised bog may be divided into:

- Coastal bog
- Plateau bog
- Upland bog
- Kermi bog
- String bog
- Palsa bog
- Polygonal bog

==== Blanket bog ====
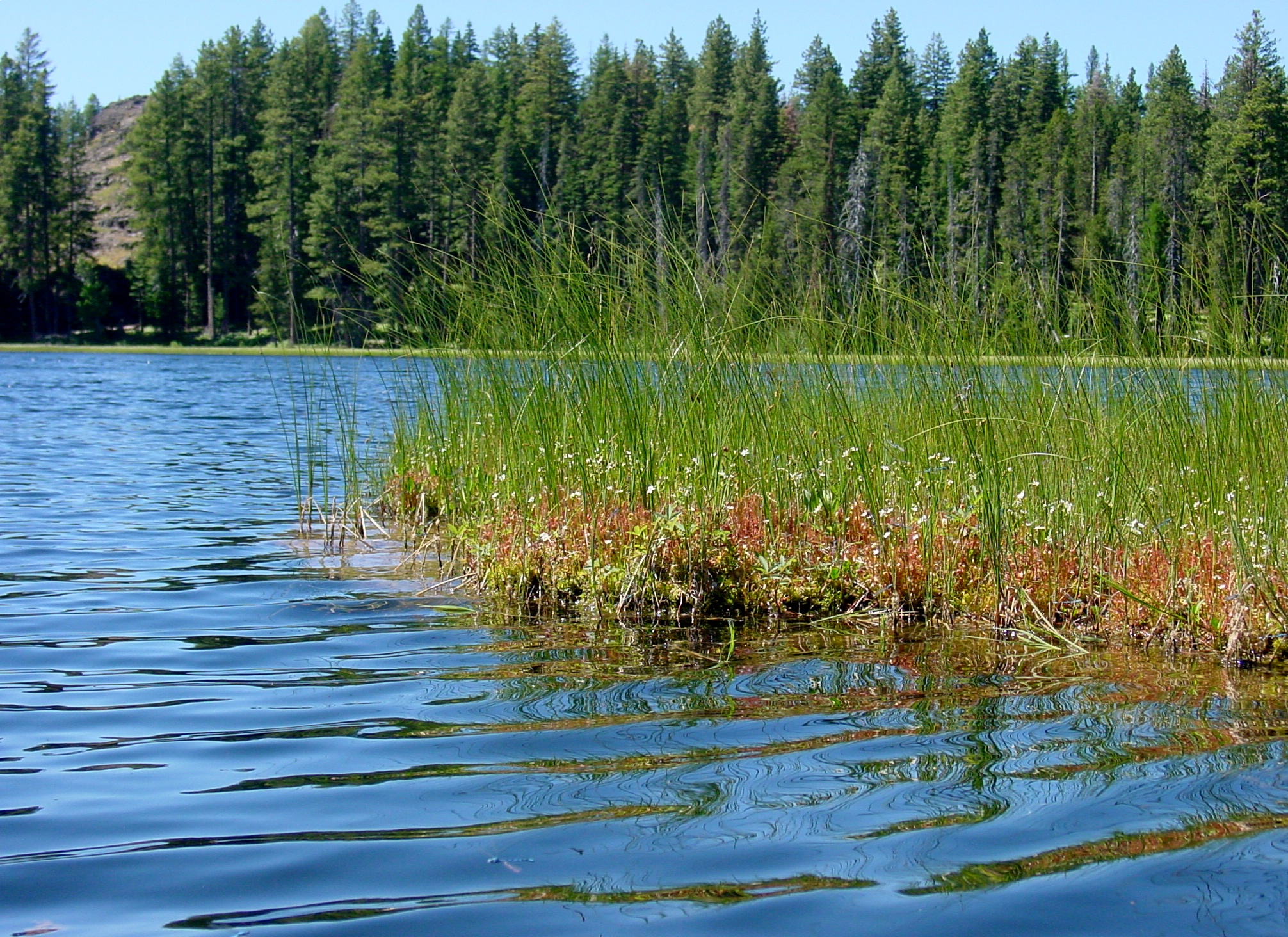
Sphagnum moss and sedges can produce floating bog mats along the shores of small lakes. This bog in Duck Lake, Oregon, US, supports populations of English sundew (Drosera anglica).

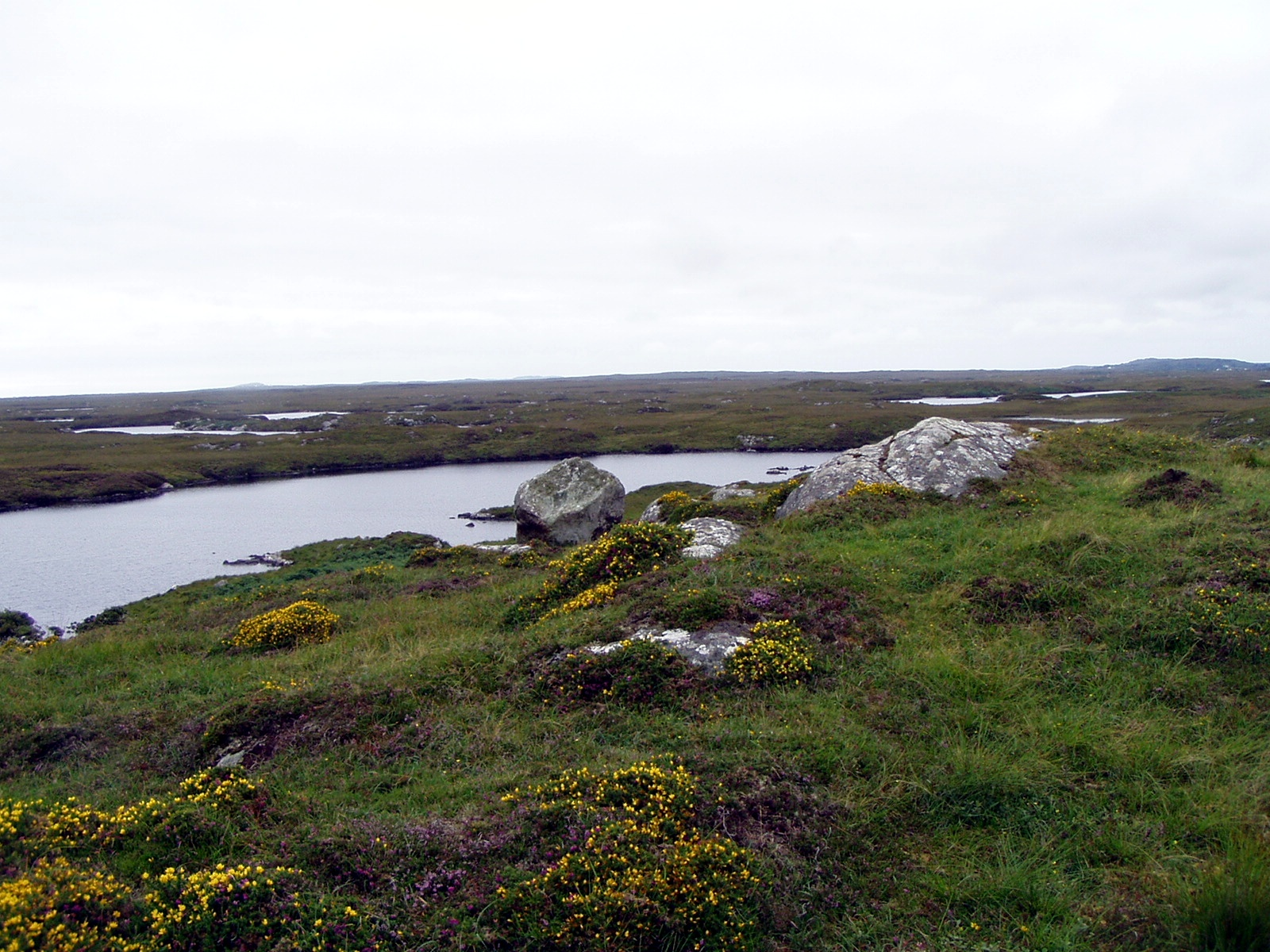
Blanket bog in Connemara, Ireland

In cool climates with consistently high rainfall (on more than c. 235 days a year), the ground surface may remain waterlogged for much of the time, providing conditions for the development of bog vegetation. In these circumstances, bog develops as a layer "blanketing" much of the land, including hilltops and slopes. Although a blanket bog is more common on acidic substrates, under some conditions it may also develop on neutral or even alkaline ones, if abundant acidic rainwater predominates over the groundwater. A blanket bog can occur in drier or warmer climates, because under those conditions hilltops and sloping ground dry out too often for peat to form – in intermediate climates a blanket bog may be limited to areas which are shaded from direct sunshine. In periglacial climates a patterned form of blanket bog may occur, known as a string bog. In Europe, these mostly very thin peat layers without significant surface structures are distributed over the hills and valleys of Ireland, Scotland, England, and Norway. In North America, blanket bogs occur predominantly in Canada east of Hudson Bay. These bogs are often still under the influence of mineral soil water (groundwater). Blanket bogs do not occur north of the 65th latitude in the northern hemisphere.

==== Quaking bog ====
A quaking bog, schwingmoor, or swingmoor is a form of floating bog occurring in wetter parts of valley bogs and raised bogs and sometimes around the edges of acidic lakes. The bog vegetation, mostly sphagnum moss anchored by sedges (such as Carex lasiocarpa), forms a floating mat approximately half a meter thick on the surface of water or above very wet peat. White spruce (Picea glauca) may grow in this bog regime. Walking on the surface causes it to move – larger movements may cause visible ripples on the surface, or they may even make trees sway. The bog mat may eventually spread across the water surface to cover bays or even entire small lakes. Bogs at the edges of lakes may become detached and form floating islands.

==== Cataract bog ====
A cataract bog is a rare ecological community formed where a permanent stream flows over a granite outcropping. The sheeting of water keeps the edges of the rock wet without eroding the soil, but in this precarious location, no tree or large shrub can maintain a roothold. The result is a narrow, permanently wet habitat.

== Uses ==
=== Industrial uses ===
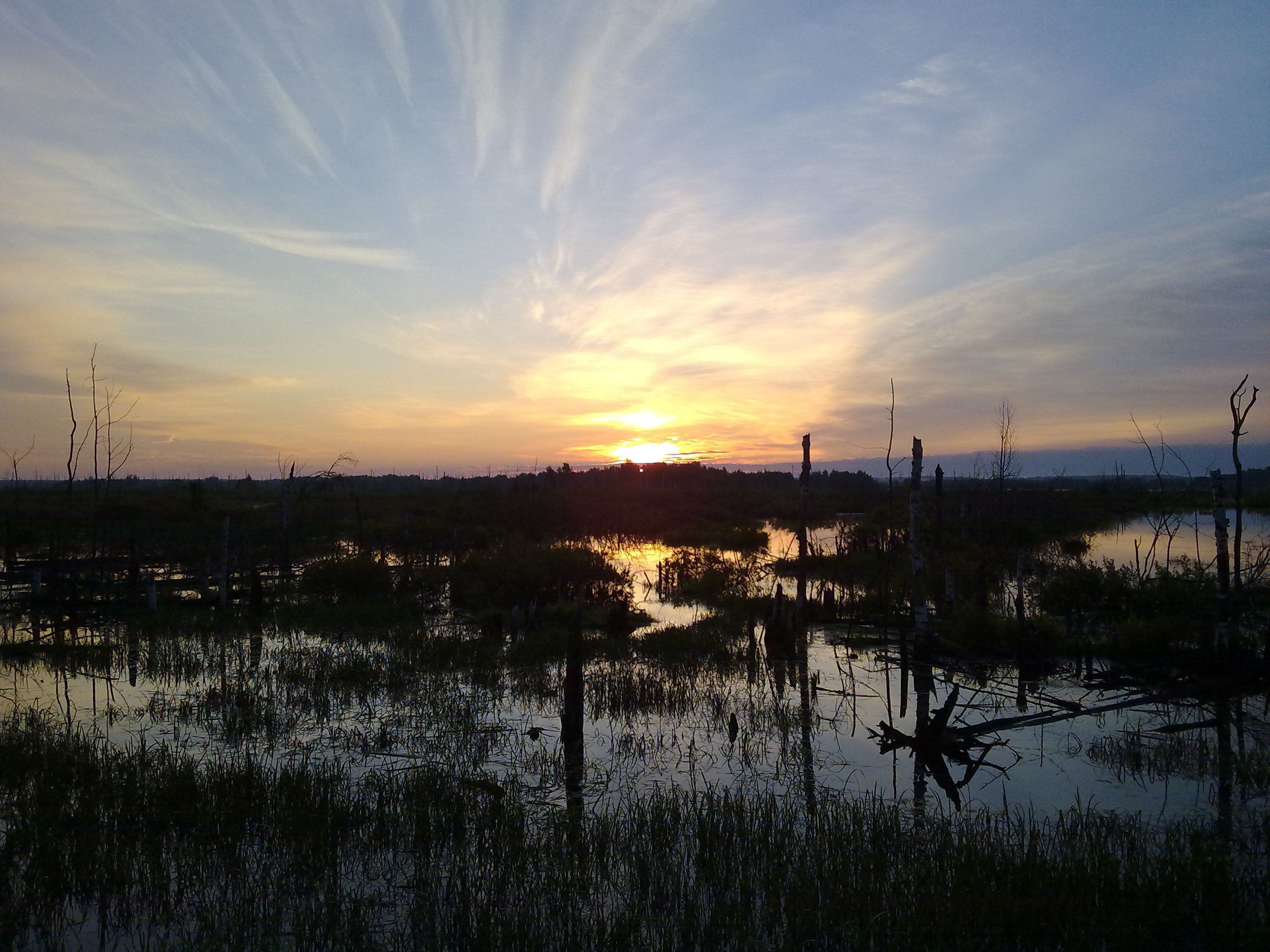
The Sitniki peat bog in Russia recultivated after industrial use

After drying, peat is used as a fuel, and it has been used that way for centuries. More than 20% of home heat in Ireland comes from peat, and it is also used for fuel in Finland, Scotland, Germany, and Russia. Russia is the leading exporter of peat for fuel, at more than 90 million metric tons per year. Ireland's Bord na Móna ("peat board") was one of the first companies to mechanically harvest peat, which is being phased out.

The other major use of dried peat is as a soil amendment (sold as moss peat or sphagnum peat) to increase the soil's capacity to retain moisture and enrich the soil. It is also used as a mulch. Some distilleries, notably in the Islay whisky-producing region, use the smoke from peat fires to dry the barley used in making Scotch whisky.

Once the peat has been extracted it can be difficult to restore the wetland, since peat accumulation is a slow process. More than 90% of the bogs in England have been damaged or destroyed. In 2011 plans for the elimination of peat in gardening products were announced by the UK government.

=== Other uses ===
The peat in bogs is an important place for the storage of carbon. If the peat decays, carbon dioxide would be released to the atmosphere, contributing to global warming. Undisturbed, bogs function as a carbon sink. As one example, the peatlands of the former Soviet Union were calculated to be removing 52 Tg of carbon per year from the atmosphere. Therefore, the rewetting of drained peatlands may be one of the most cost-effective ways to mitigate climate change.

Peat bogs are also important in storing fresh water, particularly in the headwaters of large rivers. Even the enormous Yangtze River arises in the Ruoergai peatland near its headwaters in Tibet.

Blueberries, cranberries, cloudberries, huckleberries, and lingonberries are harvested from the wild in bogs. Bog oak, wood that has been partially preserved by bogs, has been used in the manufacture of furniture.

Sphagnum bogs are also used for outdoor recreation, with activities including ecotourism and hunting. For example, many popular canoe routes in northern Canada include areas of peatland. Some other activities, such as all-terrain vehicle use, are especially damaging to bogs.

== Archaeology ==
The anaerobic environment and presence of tannic acids within bogs can result in the remarkable preservation of organic material. Finds of such material have been made in Slovenia, Denmark, Germany, Ireland, Russia, and the United Kingdom. Some bogs have preserved bog-wood, such as ancient oak logs useful in dendrochronology. They have yielded extremely well-preserved bog bodies, with hair, organs, and skin intact, buried there thousands of years ago after apparent Germanic and Celtic human sacrifice. Excellent examples of such human specimens include the Haraldskær Woman and Tollund Man in Denmark, and Lindow man found at Lindow Common in England. The Tollund Man was so well preserved that when the body was discovered in 1950, the discoverers thought it was a recent murder victim and researchers were even able to tell the last meal that the Tollund Man ate before he died: porridge and fish. This process happens because of the low oxygen levels of bogs in combination with the high acidity. These anaerobic conditions lead to some of the best-preserved mummies and offer much archeological insight into society as far as 8,000 years back. Céide Fields in County Mayo in Ireland, a 5,000-year-old neolithic farming landscape has been found preserved under a blanket bog, complete with field walls and hut sites. One ancient artifact found in various bogs is bog butter, large masses of fat, usually in wooden containers. These are thought to have been food stores of both butter and tallow.

== Image gallery ==
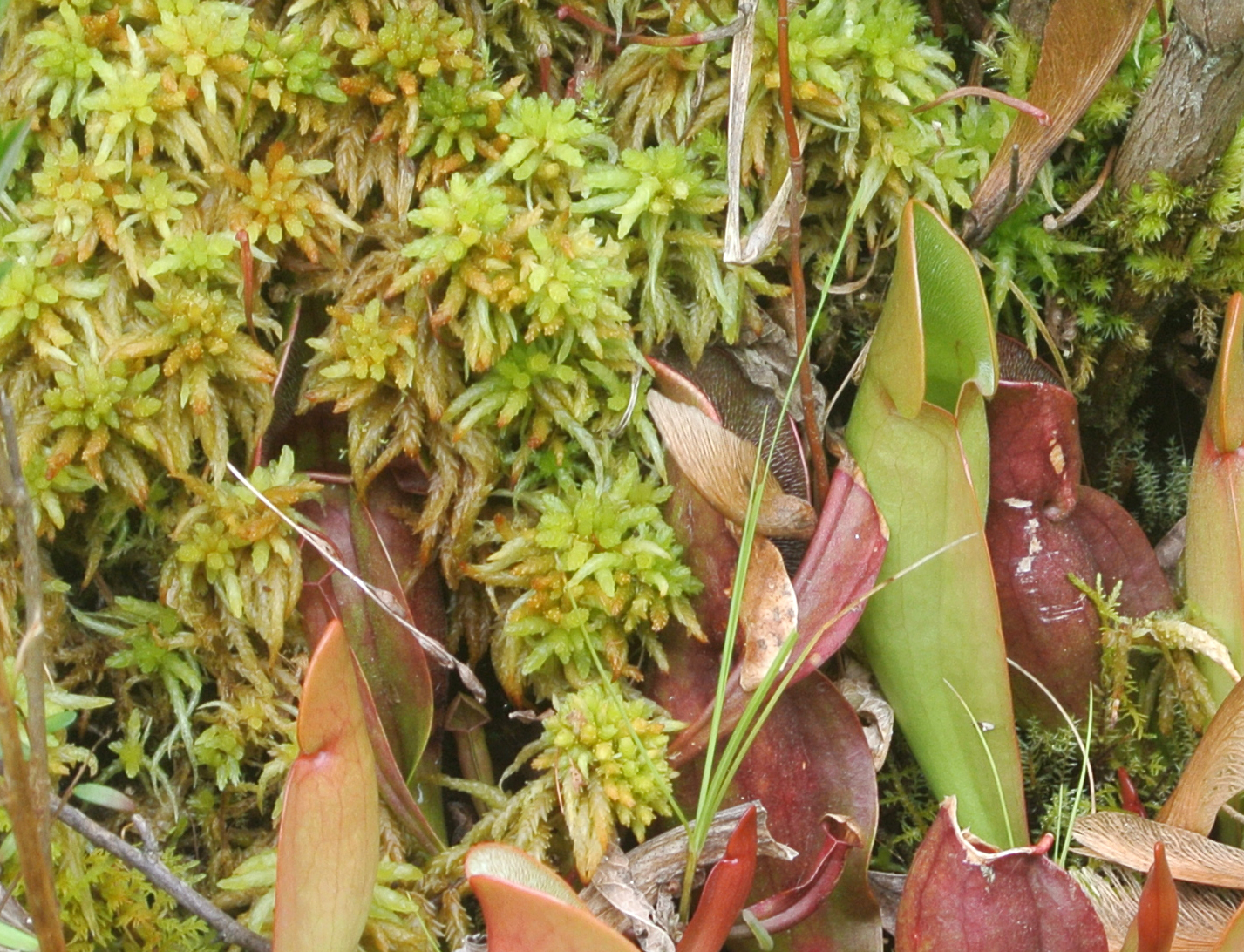
Sphagnum with northern pitcher plants at Brown's Lake Bog, Ohio, US

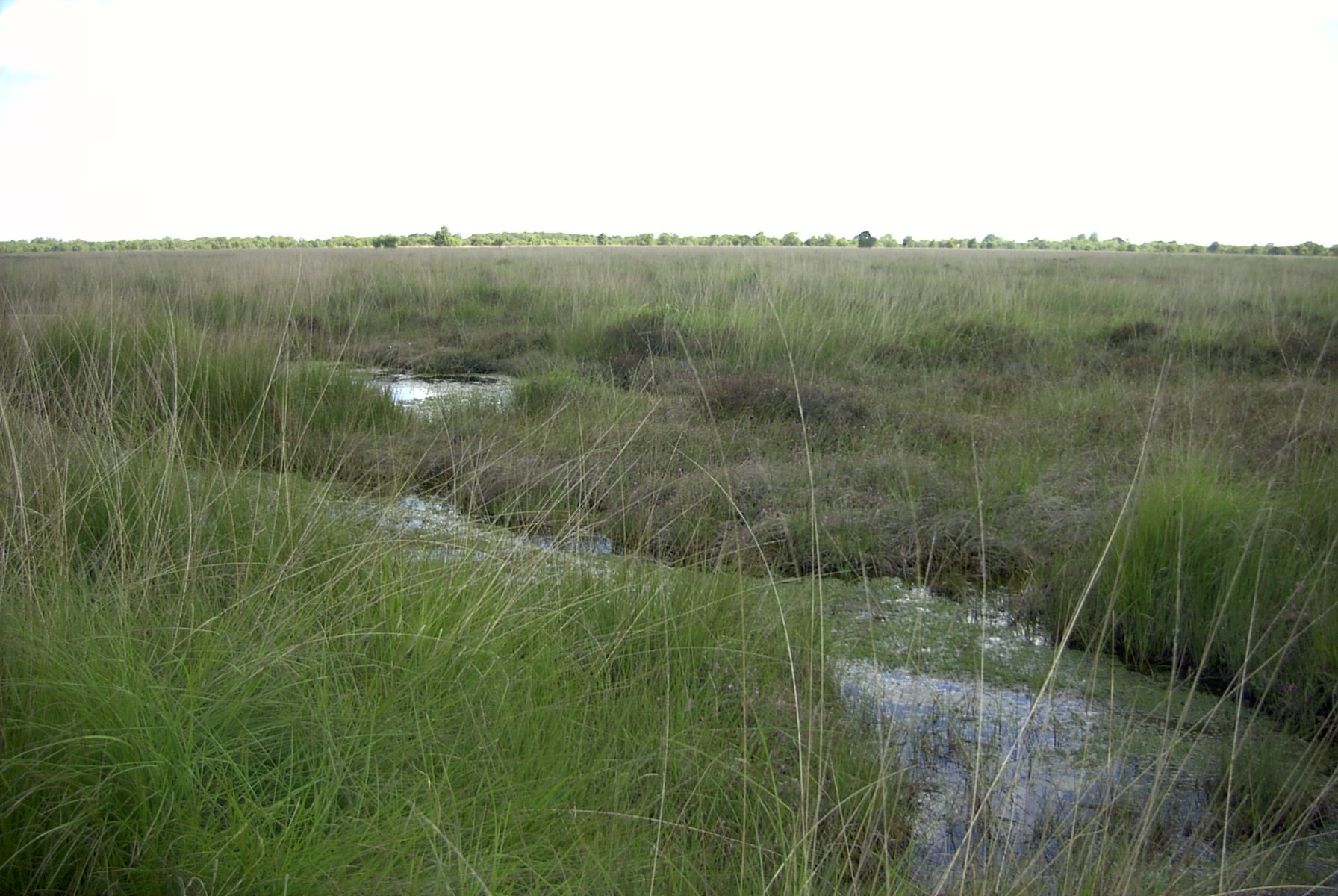
A bog in Ostfriesland, Germany

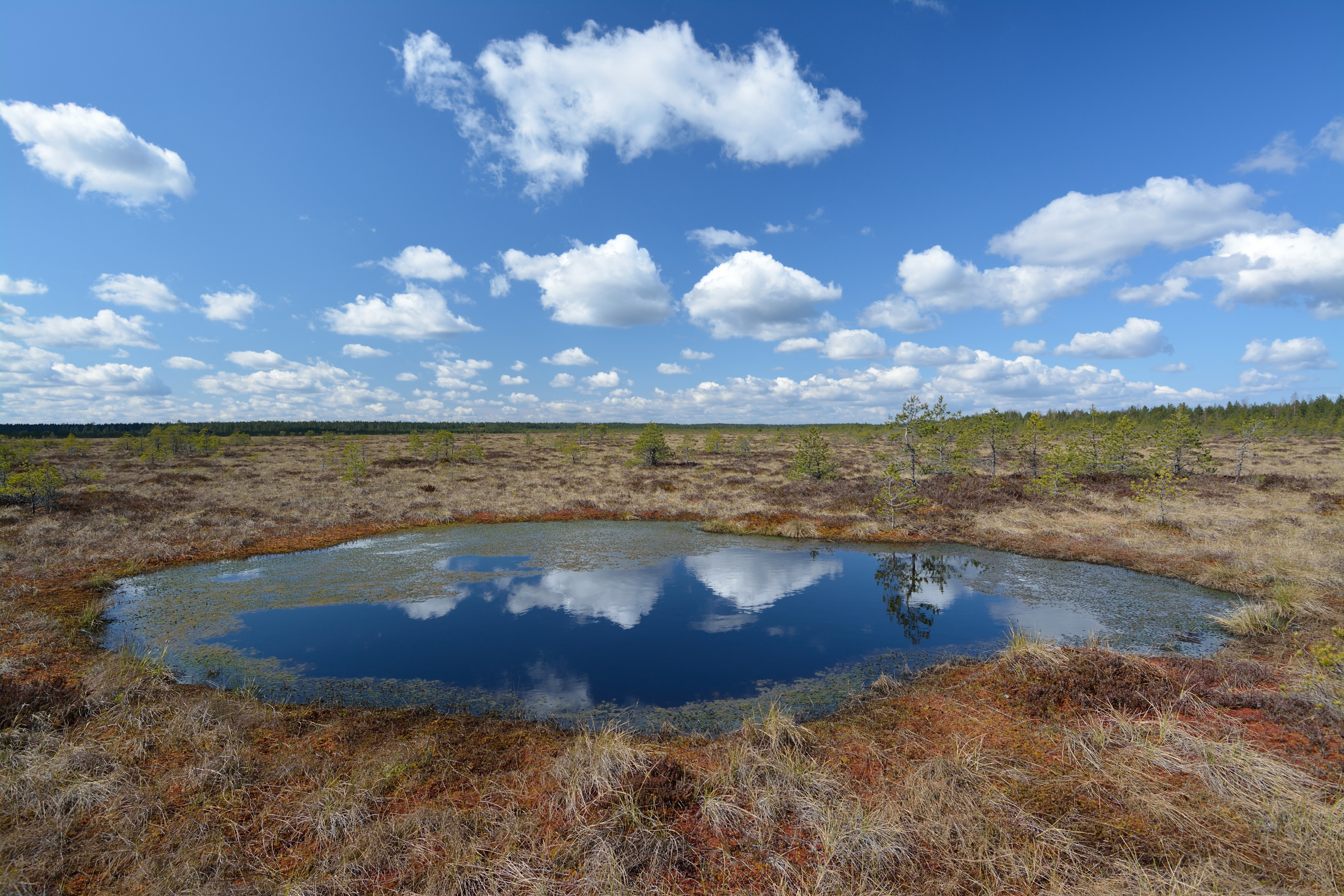
Precipitation accumulates in many bogs, forming bog pools, such as Koitjärve bog in Estonia

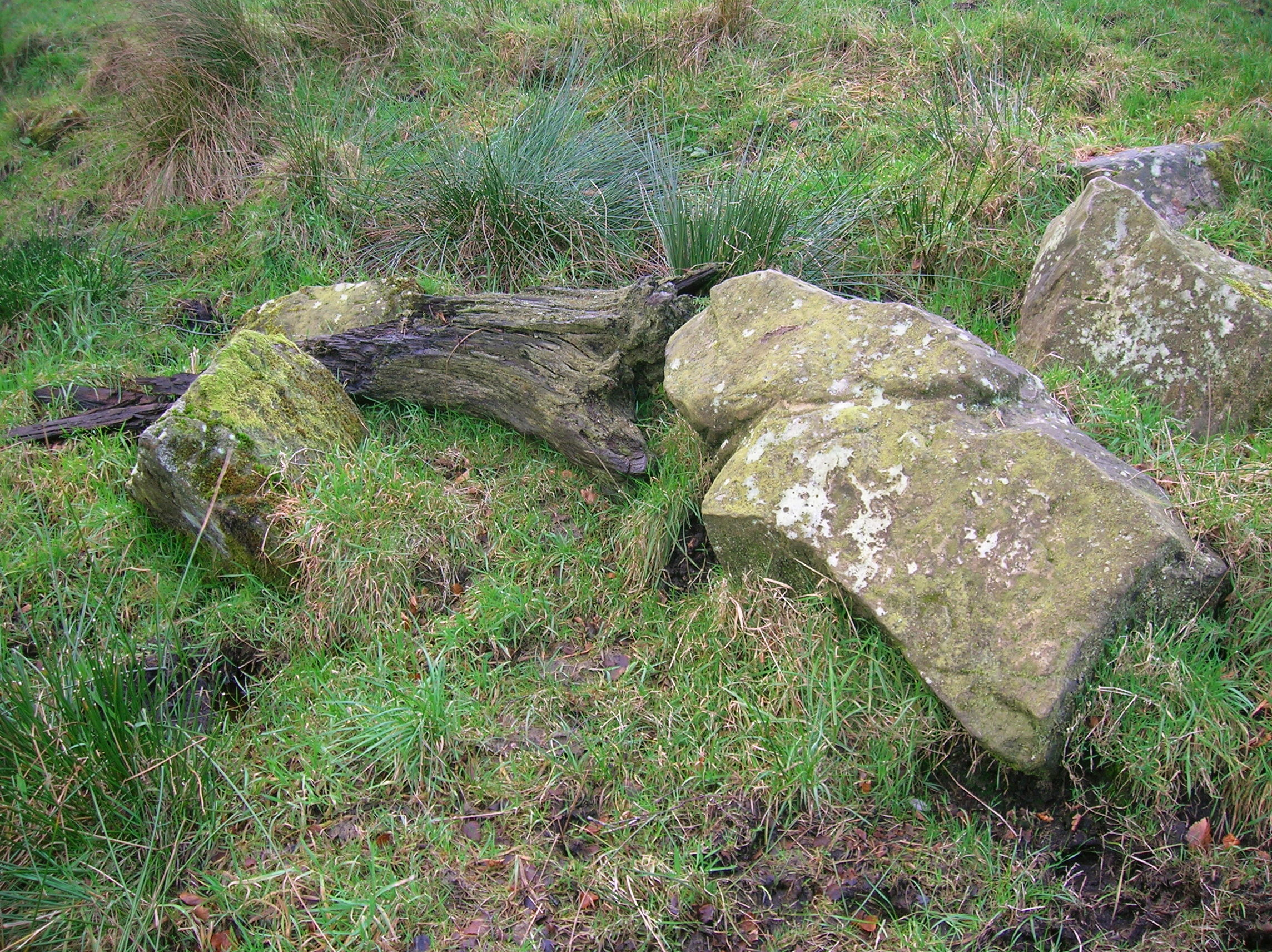
Bog-wood and boulders at the Stumpy Knowe near South Auchenmade, Ayrshire, Scotland, United Kingdom

== See also ==
- Blackwater river – Slow, dark river in forested swamps or wetlands
- Bog body – Corpse preserved in a bog
- Bog butter – Ancient substance found in peat bogs
- Bog iron – Form of iron ore deposited in bogs
- Irish Peatland Conservation Council – Irish charitable organisation
- Kerry bog slides – 2008 series of bogslides in County Kerry, Ireland
- Kettle bog – Depression formed by glaciers or floodwaters
- List of bogs
- Paludification – Ecological process of peatland formation

== Bibliography ==
- Aiton, William (1811). General View of The Agriculture of the County of Ayr; observations on the means of its improvement; drawn up for the consideration of the Board of Agriculture, and Internal Improvements, with Beautiful Engravings. Glasgow.
- Turetsky, Merritt R. (2026). Bogland: The Secret World That Defies Death and Protects Life. W. W. Norton. ISBN 978-1-324-08653-6.
