= Paludification =

Ecological process of peatland formation

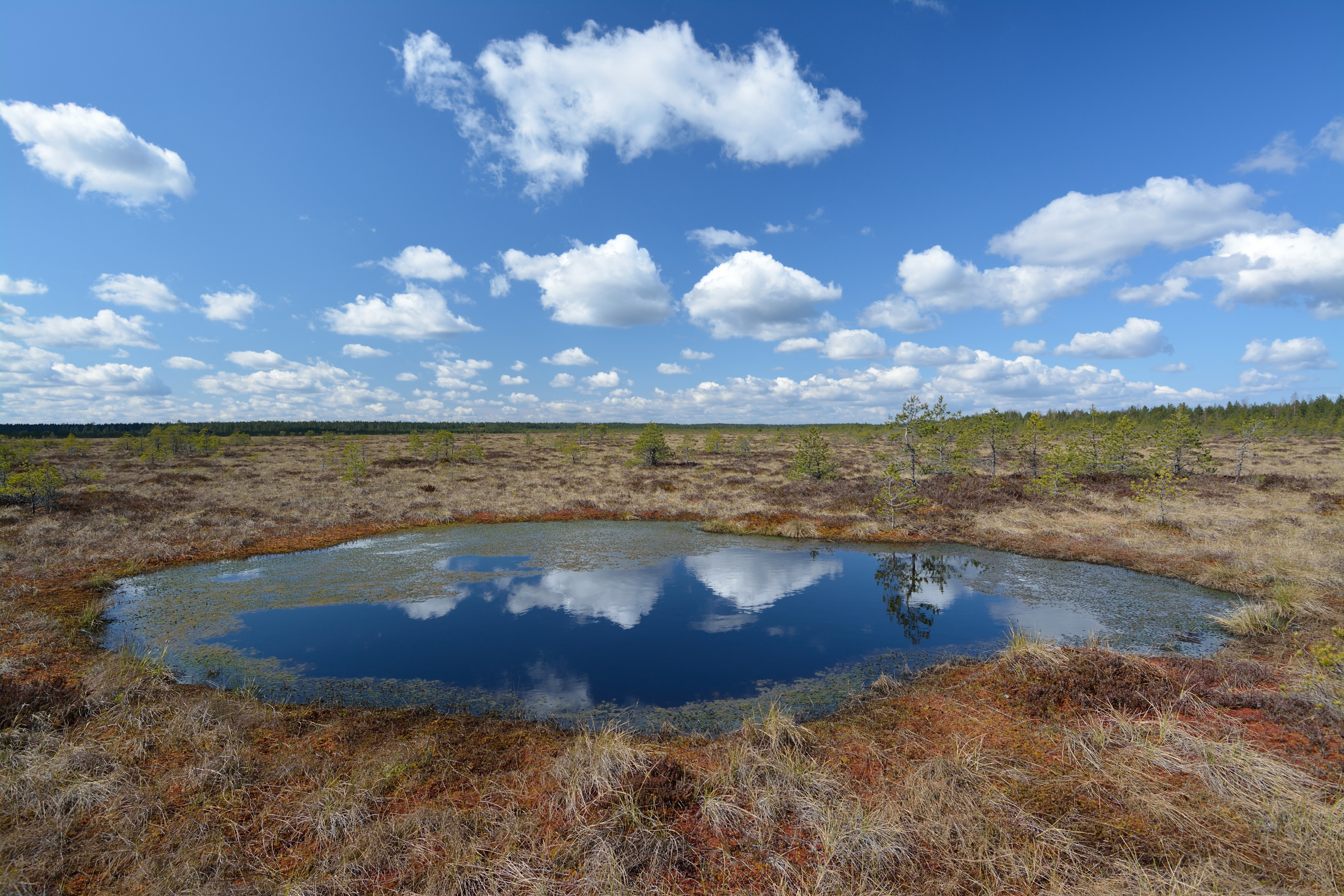
Paludification is the process by which forest is converted to peatland.

Paludification is the most common process by which peatlands in the boreal zone are formed. Paludification involves peat accumulation on previously drier, vegetated habitats in mineral soils, representing a shift from forests, grasslands, or long-exposed bare land to peatland, with organic soils initiating and thickening as peat accumulates. The accumulation of peat can be driven by factors external to the ecosystem, such as climate, geomorphology, geology, and soils, or by internal factors within the ecosystem, such as local peat accumulation. Central to the process is the hydrological balance, which must be positive (wet) during the growing season for paludification to proceed.

== Formation ==
The process is characterized by peat initialization on previously drier and vegetated habitats over inorganic soils, with no fully aquatic phase. Thus the paludification process includes a shift from forests, grassland or long exposed bare land to peatland. The initiation of this accumulation of organic matter (i.e. peat), can be controlled by both allogenic (i.e. external to the ecosystem) and autogenic (i.e. internal to the ecosystem) factors. The hydrological balance is critical for the initiation of peat. The hydrological balance can simply be defined as the difference between the incoming and outgoing amount of water (e.g. precipitation minus evapotranspiration and minus runoff). Usually it is considered that factors such as climate, geomorphology, geology and soils control this balance. However, paludification may also be just a result of the local accumulation of peat (i.e. autogenic factor).

== Climatic factors ==
The climate factor has a great influence on the paludification process. The development of a paludified soil requires a positive hydrological balance during the growing season. Therefore, there needs to be a shift in local hydrological conditions. Such a shift could be caused by an increase in water inputs or a decrease in outputs. Human activity such as tree removal, natural or human induced forest fires, increase in precipitation, and podsolization, etc. are processes which could change those in- and outputs.

== Geomorphology ==
The factor geomorphology (and also topography) creates spatial diversity in the hydrological characteristics of the landscape. The flat topography (and thus low slopes) in the two major peatlands in the world, located in the West Siberian Plain and in the Hudson/James Bay Lowlands of Canada respectively, illustrate the significance of this factor.

== Impact of soils ==
Geology and soils (i.e. bedrock and texture) play also an important role. When the mineral soil is composed of heavy clay, the soil will act as an impermeable substrate that facilitates water accumulation.

Simply an increase in surface water from melting permafrost can cause increased paludification in boreal ecosystems.

In the context of forest management, paludification has been studied intensively during the last decade. Especially because of the negative effects paludification has for the boreal forests. In this way that paludification may lead to:

- Reduction in soil temperature, soil aeration, nutrient availability, decomposition rates
- Formation of permafrost in certain areas
- Increase of the water table level
- Decrease in tree productivity.

== See also ==
- Bog
- List of bogs
- Differences between bogs and other wetlands
- Kettle bog
- Muskeg
