= Bog butter =

Ancient substance found in peat bogs

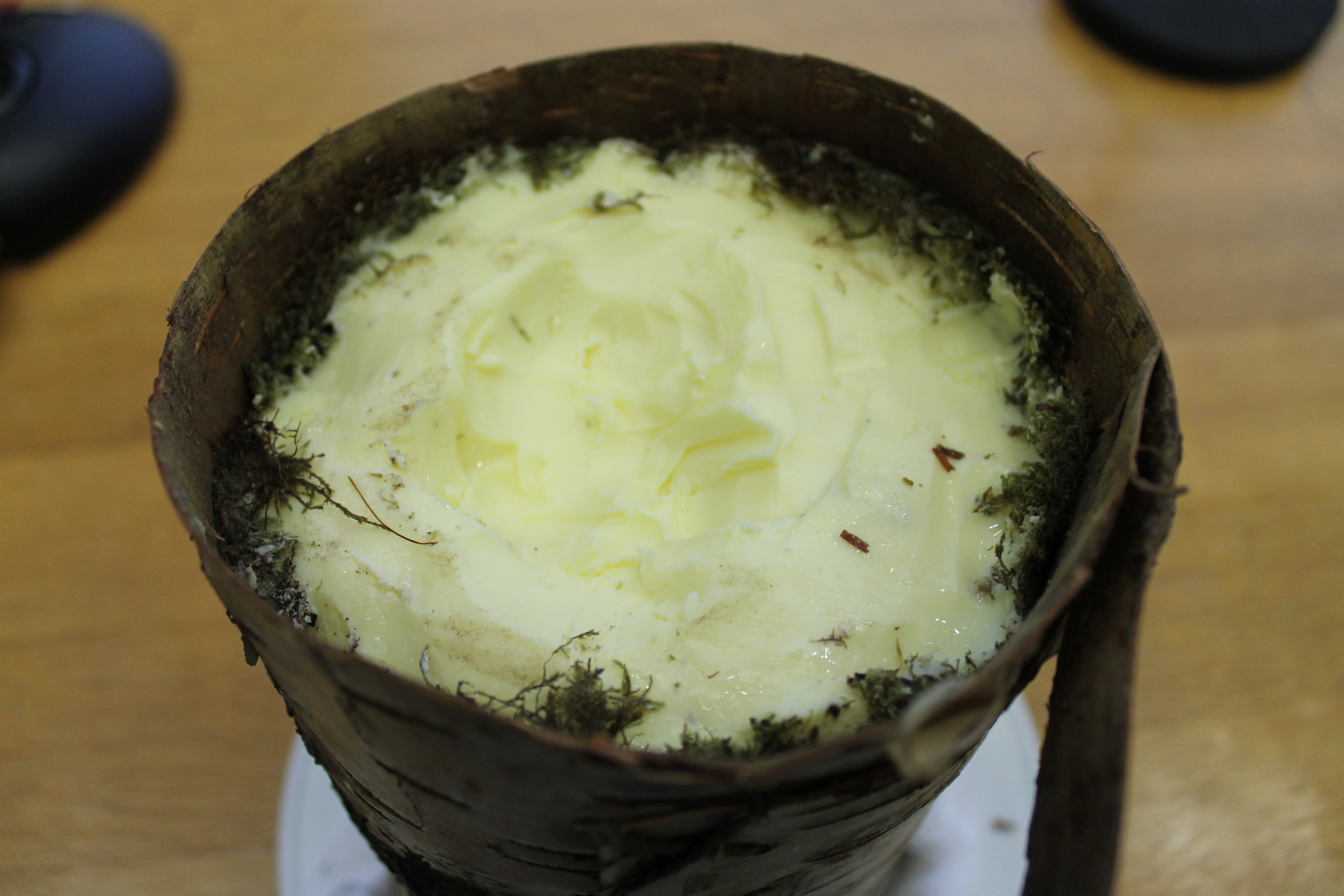
Bog butter made in 2012 for the Oxford Symposium on Food and Cookery.

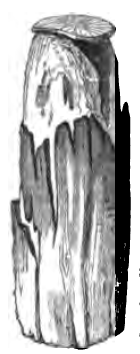
Bog butter from A Descriptive Catalogue of the Antiquities in the Museum of the Royal Irish Academy, 1857

Bog butter is an ancient waxy substance found buried in peat bogs, particularly in Ireland and Scotland. Likely an old method of making and preserving butter, some tested lumps of bog butter were made of dairy, while others were made of animal fat.

== History ==
Bog butter is found buried inside some sort of wooden container, such as buckets, kegs, barrels, dishes and butter churns. It is of animal origin, and is also known as butyrellite. Until 2003 scientists and archaeologists were uncertain of the origin of bog butter. Scientists working at the University of Bristol discovered that some samples of the "butter" were of adipose/tallow origin while others were of dairy origin.

In Ireland, the practice of burying bog butter dates back to the first century AD, with bog butter found in County Meath. On 28 April 2011, there were press reports of a find of approximately 50 kilograms (110 lb) of bog butter in Tullamore, County Offaly. Found in a carved wooden vessel 30 centimetres (1 ft) in diameter and 60 centimetres (2 ft) in height, it was buried at a depth of 2.3 metres (7.5 ft), and still bore a faint smell of dairy. In Scotland, the practice of burying bog butter only dates back to the 2nd or 3rd century AD.

Bog butter was produced by interring butter or other fats within a peat bog after encasement within a wooden container, although augmentation of the latter with a deerskin bladder or layers of plant fibers was not unusual. The containers tend to be well-sealed with a convex surface, perhaps to prevent water from pooling and stagnating in direct contact with the packaging and/or contents.

The original motivations behind the creation of bog butter are unclear. One widespread theory is that food products were buried in bogs to hinder spoilage. Peat bogs, being low temperature, low oxygen, highly acidic environments, have excellent preservative properties. Experiments conducted by researcher Daniel C. Fisher demonstrated that pathogen and bacterial counts of meat buried in peat bogs for up to two years were comparable to levels found in control samples stored in a modern freezer, suggesting that this could be an effective preservation method.

An alternative hypothesis is "primitive food processing": it is possible that "chemical reactions in the soil helped to transform the foods to more palatable products than could be made fresh"—especially given the absence of salt in bog butters—or increase available nutrient content. In traditional cuisines, burial is a fairly common step in the preparation of highly perishable foods such as meat and dairy products; examples include century eggs (China), gravad lax (Scandinavia), hákarl (Iceland), the Inuit dishes igunaq and kiviaq, and Moroccan smen. Modern experiments in creating bog butter yield a product that seems to be an acquired taste, with "flavor notes which were described primarily as ‘animal’ or ‘gamey’, ‘moss’, ‘funky’, ‘pungent’, and ‘salami’. These characteristics are certainly a far cry from the creamy acidity of a freshly made cultured butter, but has been found useful in the kitchen especially with strong and pungent dishes, in a similar manner to aged ghee"

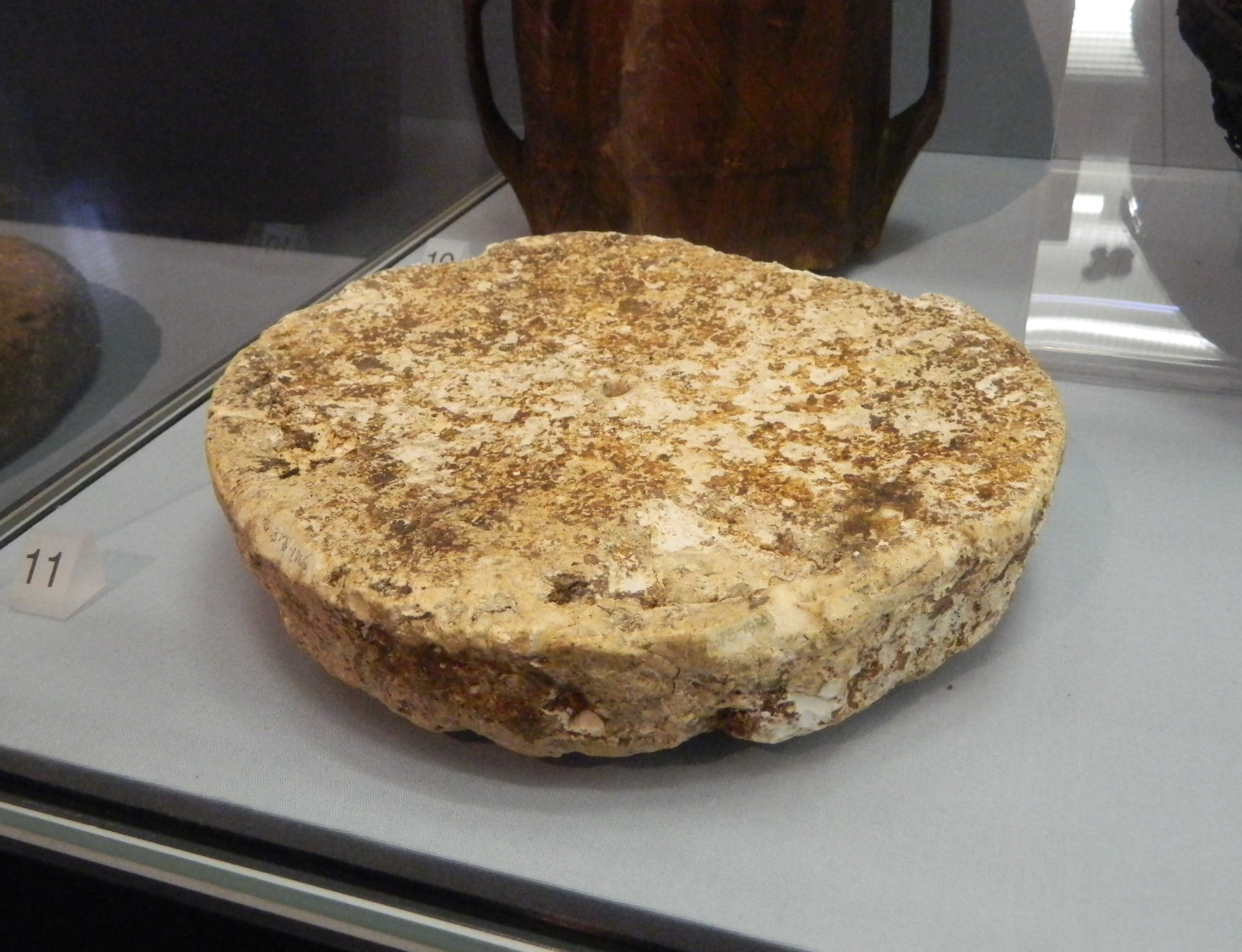
15th–16th-century bog butter found near Enniskillen, County Fermanagh

The practice of burying butter and other fats could also have arisen as a strategy for protecting vital provisions from thieves and/or invaders. For instance, in early medieval Ireland, there is no doubt that butter was a luxury food, with legal texts carefully delineating the quantity of butter which members of each socio-economic class were entitled to consume. Yet butter also had numerous, widespread non-culinary uses such as the payment of taxes, rents, and fines; facilitation of hospitality; care of the sick and infirm; and strengthening of social bonds. On occasion, butter might also have less prestigious applications, including waterproofing, and making candles or even cement. The frequency with which famines and animal epidemics struck would have necessitated development of storage techniques to protect this important product. It is possible many stashes were never retrieved due to enemy occupation.

== See also ==
- Adipocere
