= Derrybrien Necklace =

Historical ornament from Ireland

The Derrybrien Necklace was an Irish archaeological discovery dated to 800-700 BC.

In June 1954, Joseph McHugo of Derrybrien was turf-cutting in an area of upland bog some six hundred feet above sea level. At a depth of thirty to thirty-five cm, he discovered a large number of small, scattered beads, spread over an area of about one metre. A small fragment of gold was found in association.

As this part of the bog had never been cut before, he concluded they must be ancient and of archaeological interest. Via the Gardaí in Gort, the National Museum in Dublin was contacted who conducted an investigation under Ellen Prendergast and G. F. Mitchell.

Their investigation stated that there were four hundred and six beads, made of amber; ' ...in a rather decayed condition and many were damaged ... together with numerous fragments. '; it was estimated that there may have been 500 beads originally. They were of various shapes and sizes, but all ' ...perforated for stringing. ' While no trace of the string was found, the gold fragment was identified as the probable remains of a clasp.

Prendergast and Mitchell said that the Derrybrien necklace is ' ...one of the finest recorded for Ireland ', despite the existence of a number of other similar finds. The amber was believed to have originated in the Baltic Sea region, and dated to the end of the Bronze Age, approximately 800-700 BC.
