= Carbajal Valley =

Landform of the Fuegian Andes in southern Argentina

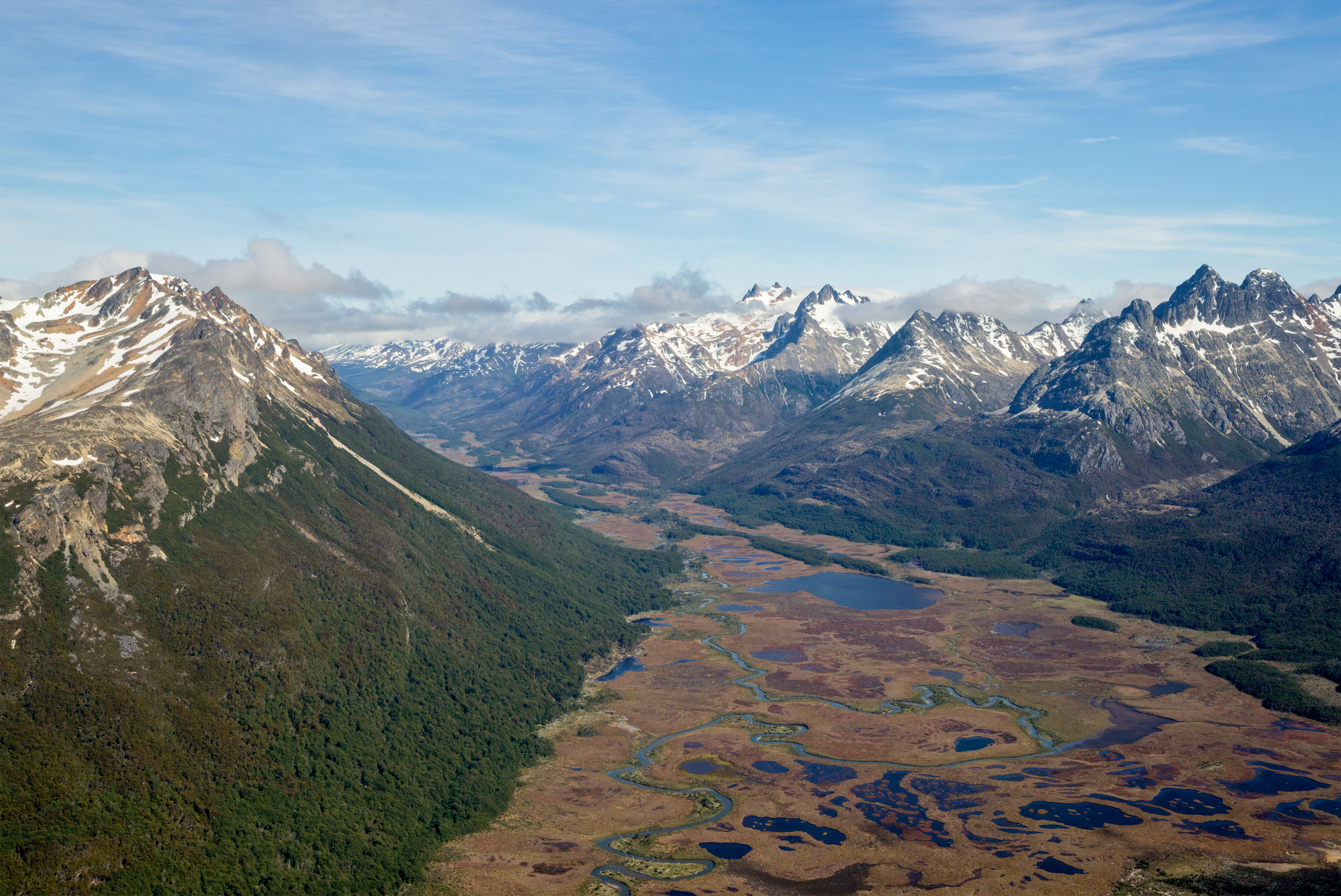
- Aerial view, east end

- Location within Southern Patagonia
- Floor elevation: ~150 metres (490 ft) asl
- Length: ~20 kilometres (12.4 mi) NW-SE
- Width: 2.6 kilometres (1.6 mi)

Geography
- Coordinates: 54°41′9″S 68°20′58″W
- Rivers: Río Olivia
- Interactive map of Carbajal Valley

The Carbajal Valley (Spanish: Valle Carbajal) is a valley in the Fuegian Andes of southern Tierra del Fuego Province, Argentina. The Carbajal valley is approximately 20 kilometres (12 mi) long, running west to east, between the Alvear mountain range to the north and the Vinciguerra range to the south. Andes peak heights in the region are generally less than 1,250 metres (4,100 ft) above sea level.

Argentine Route 3 runs diagonally through Ushuaia (SW-NE) along the Río Olivia past the west base of Mount Olivia and around the northwestern and northern base of Monte Cinco Hermanos.

== Topography ==
During the Last Glacial Maximum (LGM), approximately 20,000 years ago, (Note: Research suggests that the LGM occurred 19–23 ka BP.) a valley glacier carved the Carbajal-Tierra Mayor valley (described as the "glaciation axis of the Fuegian Andes") from northwest to southeast, with an ice tongue forking south along the Valle Río Olivia into the Beagle Channel immediately to the east of Ushuaia. Based on the geological study of the erosion patterns, the Carbajal glacier's ice thickness was 600–800 metres (2,000–2,600 ft). Several existing glaciers (e.g., Ojos de Albino, Vinciguerra) were tributaries of the Carbajal glacier.

In the early Holocene period (11,700–8,200 years ago), by 10,300 years ago, ice had receded from the valley walls and vegetation was growing. By the middle Holocene period (8,200–4,200 years ago), forest growth was expanding.

The nearly U-shaped valley floor is covered with Sphagnum peat bogs and poorly drained mires.
