= Auld Ones =

- Bernie and Mary
- Country of origin: Ireland
- No. of episodes: 26

Production
- Running time: 5 minutes

Original release
- Network: RTÉ Two
- Release: 16 September 2003 – 14 July 2007

Auld Ones is an Irish animated television programme broadcast on RTÉ Two. It featured the antics of two Dublin pensioners, Bernie and Mary who sit at a bus stop reminiscing about their youthful adventures. The programme symbolises the tedium and meaninglessness of human life, which loosely connects the characters to one of the themes of existentialist philosophy. Divided into two series, it aired on Mondays at 22:40 and is a Wireless Production.

== Characters ==
=== Bernie ===
	Details
Name	Bernadette Maria Contracepta Mulligan
Place of birth	St Consumpta's Maternity Hospital
Starsign	Scorpio
Favourite singer	Ronnie Drew

=== Mary ===
	Details
Name	Mary Concita Malingo Burke
Date of birth	3 September 1939
Starsign	Virgo
Favourite singer	Herself

== Episodes ==
There are a total of twenty-six episodes aired over two series.

=== Series one ===
Series one began broadcasting in September 2003.

#	Episode	Aired	Summary
1	"Dodgy Smoked Cod"	16 September 2003	Bernie relates a tale of her adverse reaction to a dodgy smoked cod, and the subsequent hallucination where she remembers her first boyfriend Frankie and their ill-fated tryst in the outdoor septic tank.
2	"January Sales"	17 September 2003	In preparation for the yearly trip to Guiney's, the ladies reminisce on the violence of the previous year's January sales, and the lengths that some people will go for just one bargain.
3	"Intoxicous"	18 September 2003	Bernie reveals the unique secret behind her happy marriage, and how she copes with Tommy's rare drinking disorder, Intoxicous Perpetualis, whereby he must be kept in a state of suspended inebriation to survive.
4	"PIO"	19 September 2003	Mary's miraculous medal triggers the memories of the Padre Pio Convention, the ladies' long-time infatuation with their favourite saint and his related merchandise.
5	"Bingo"	20 September 2003	Bernie relives her greatest achievement; her victory in the national Bingo Finals (with a little help from her best friend Mary). And we meet her nemesis Big Celia, whose favourite pastime is revenge.
6	"Poltergeist"	21 September 2003	Bernie's account of her outrage over the supernatural mayhem she experienced in her house, and her subsequent domestication of the poltergeist when all the Exorcists were booked out, getting it to perform household chores in lieu of rent.
7	"Counter-Terrorism 101"	22 September 2003	Bernie describes how she decided to take a night course in The Late Late Show off-season, how the only course available was in Counter-Terrorism, and how she put these skills to good use in her daily life.
8	"Strip Club"	23 September 2003	The second anniversary of their friend Bridie's passing prompts their conversation of how they fulfilled her last wish for one last girl's night out. They discuss their excursion to the local strip club and the one stripper who really caught their eye that night.
9	"The Internet"	24 September 2003	Bernie tells her tale of when she won an "Internet" in a raffle, and how this peculiar assortment of components turned out to be most useful around the house; but not in the way anyone else would employ a computer.
10	"Séance"	25 September 2003	The ladies talk about how, in an effort to settle Bernie's curiosity about her late twin sister's affairs, they consulted a medium. The resulting séance consists of cross-dimensional arguments over the location of the heirloom crockery and other unresolved matters.
11	"The Bookies"	26 September 2003	When a bookmakers opens up beside the local hospice, the girls avail of the special offer: placing bets on the outgoing patients. Bernie's "horse" comes in and she spends her accumulator on some extravagant accessories.
12	"Papal Visit"	27 September 2003	1981: John Paul II visits Ireland. Bernie describes her scheme that resulted in getting the pontiff to come over for dinner, and the ensuing mishap that led to him getting lost.
13	"Tea Bag Drought"	28 September 2003	The girls talk about the dark days of the tea-bag drought, and their moon shining efforts to make their own tea bags; and their experimentation with different ingredients until a satisfactory simulation is found.

=== Series two ===
Series two began broadcasting in July 2007.

#	Episode	Aired	Summary
1	"A Tale of Two Livers"	2 July 2007	Tommy needs a liver transplant and fast. However, as his old liver leaves and the healthy one arrives, will Tommy realise too late that it's better the devil you know?!
2	"Ready, Steady, Coddle!"	3 July 2007	Coddle. A gourmet meal to some. A pulsating nightmare to others. Bernie reveals a dinner shrouded in the mystery of ancient times, and much salt.
3	"Apocalypse Soon!"	4 July 2007	Mary has predicted the end of the world, again! At the bus stop the girls wait for the end to come. Or the arrival of the first bus into town. Whichever comes first.
4	"The Fury and the Filth"	5 July 2007	Both Bernie and Mary discover shocking secrets about each other at the bus stop. The shattering revelations threaten to tear their friendship apart.
5	"Hip to be Square"	6 July 2007	Jealousy rears its prescription glasses as the ladies compare their new prosthetic hips.
6	"Back to Basics"	7 July 2007	The thorny issue of women's rights raises its irrational head again and its up to the girls to bring some old fashioned wisdom to the fray.
7	"Feeling Bleu"	8 July 2007	Rarely have the French been animated in such a sympathetic way as Mary tells of her old flame, Jean-Luc, and their passionate but tragic love affair.
8	"When Skangers Walked the Earth"	9 July 2007	They rob cars, cause fights and abbreviate their own names. Now Mary exposes the terrible truth behind skangers that the government did not want anyone to know.
9	"Slots, Tots and Sea Monsters"	10 July 2007	Bernie and Mary grab as many grandchildren as they can find and head off for the unique charms of the seaside. Gambling and octopuses jeopardise the trip.
10	"Tommy's Arse.com"	11 July 2007	Tommy has to resort to nude modelling for money as the Social Welfare has cut his benefits. Little does he know how far his new career will take off.
11	"Divine Comeuppance"	12 July 2007	Bernie and Mary battle it out for the last ticket to Lourdes.
12	"The Plumber Always Knocks Twice"	13 July 2007	Bernie and Infidelity cross paths when a handsome plumber comes a calling. Lust and betrayal are never far away in this steamy episode.
13	"Give Up Yer Auld Royalties"	14 July 2007	Bernie is jealous, as Mary becomes an overnight star when old school recordings of her are animated. Bernie, however, is determined not to let success go to her head. Very determined.
