= Derrybrien =

Village in County Galway, Ireland

Derrybrien Daraidh Braoin
- Village
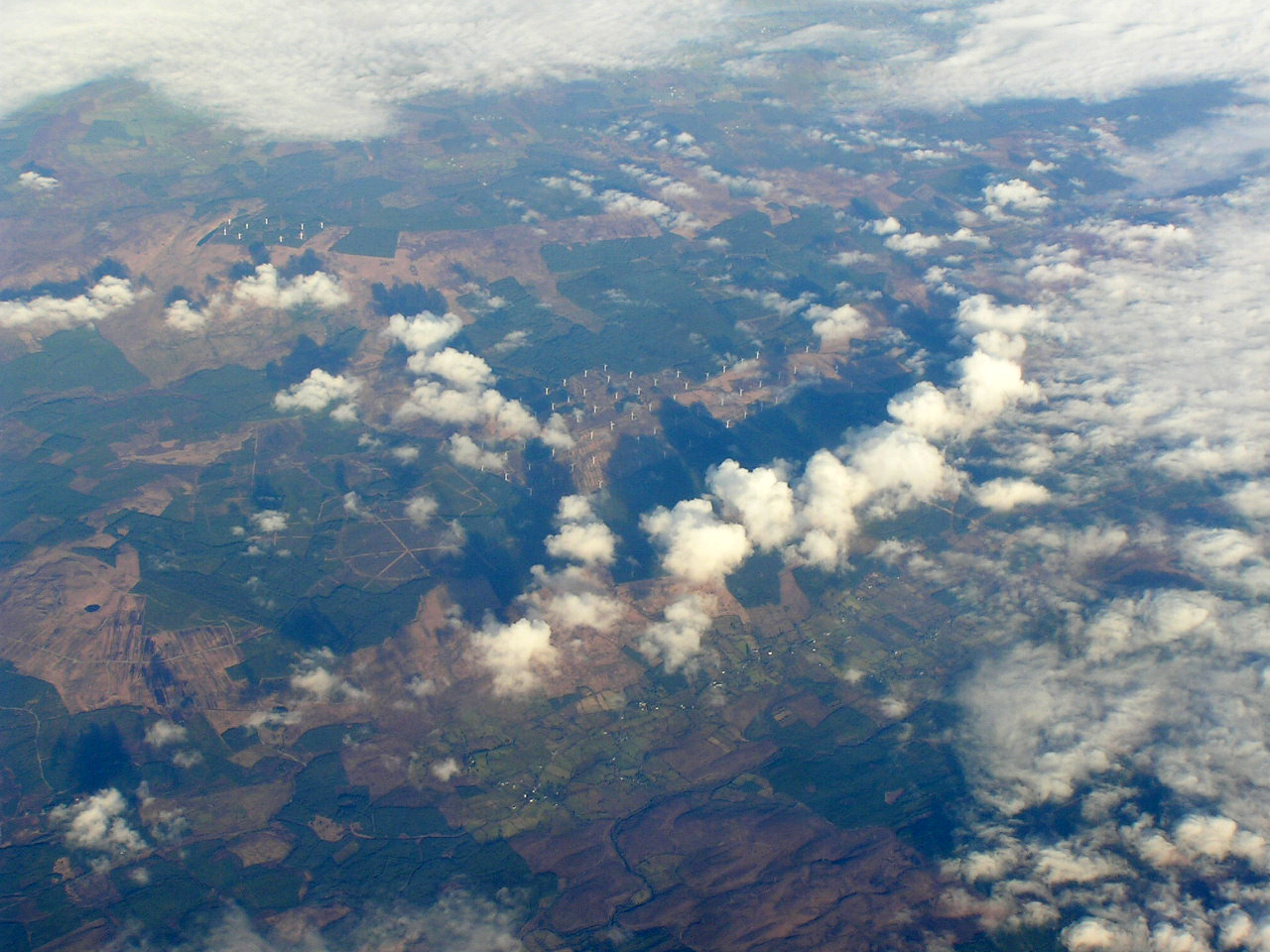
- Derrybrien Village and Wind Farm

- Location in Ireland
- Coordinates: 53.0659°N 8.6105°W
- Country: Ireland
- Province: Connacht
- County: Galway
- Irish Grid Reference: M590018

Derrybrien (Irish: Daraidh Braoin) is a tiny village in County Galway, Ireland. It lies along the R353 road in the Slieve Aughty Mountains. The village church is dedicated to Saint Patrick and is part of the Roman Catholic Parish of Ballinakill and Derrybrien.

The Derrybrien Necklace, an amber beaded necklace dated to the Bronze Age was discovered near Derrybrien in June 1954 by Joseph McHugo.

== Wind farm ==
A 60MW wind farm with 70 turbines is located on a hill nearby. The 2003 Derrybrien landslide resulted in the prosecution and conviction of the engineering and construction companies involved in the wind farm's development. As of 16 March 2022, the wind farm was decommissioned and the ESB was reportedly considering how to proceed with dismantling it. In September 2022 the government stated that the wind farm would not be reopened.

== See also ==
- List of towns and villages in Ireland
