= Graeme T. Swindles =

Geoscientist

Graeme Swindles is a geoscientist from Northern Ireland, currently a Professor of Physical Geography at Queen's University Belfast. He was born in 1980. He is also a musician and songwriter (Gray Morrison).

== Career ==
Swindles was Associate Professor of Earth System Dynamics at the University of Leeds and lecturer in Physical Geography and Archaeology at the University of Bradford. He is an earth system scientist with broad research interests in past-present-future climate change. His main research foci include peatland ecosystems, climate change and human-environment relations.

=== Research work ===
Swindles was awarded the Lewis Penny Medal by the Quaternary Research Association in 2012. He has made contributions to the fields of earth system science, peatland science, climate change, biogeochemistry and palaeo- and neo-ecology. He has also suggested that volcanic eruptions may increase as the planet warms. He also argues that the Anthropocene should remain an informal concept and not be formalised as a geological epoch^{[8]}.

== Selected publications ==
- Charman DJ, Beilman DW, Blaauw M, Booth RK et al including Swindles, G.T. Climate-related changes in peatland carbon accumulation during the last millennium. Biogeosciences. 2013 Feb 8;10(2):929-44.
- Swindles, G.T., Morris, P.J., Mullan, D.J., Payne, R.J., Roland, T.P., Amesbury, M.J., Lamentowicz, M., Turner, T.E., Gallego-Sala, A., Sim, T., Barr, I.D., Blaauw, M., Blundell, A., Chambers, F.M., Charman, D.J., Feurdean, A., Galloway, J.M., Gałka, M., Green, S., Kajukało, K., Karofeld, E., Korhola, A., Lamentowicz, L., Langdon, P., Marcisz, K., Mauquoy, D., Mazei, Y.A., McKeown, M., Mitchell, E.A.D., Novenko, E., Plunkett, G., Roe, H.M., Schoning, K., Sillasoo, Ü., Tsyganov, A.N., van der Linden, M., Väliranta, M. and Warner, B. 2019.Widespread drying of European peatlands in recent centuries. Nature Geoscience 12, 922–928.
- Morris, P.J., Swindles, G.T., Valdes, P., Ivanovic, R., Gregoire, L., Smith, M., Tarasov, L., Haywood, A. and Bacon, K. 2018 Global peatland initiation driven by regionally-asynchronous warming]. Proceedings of the National Academy of Sciences 115, 4851–4856.
- Sim, T.G., Swindles, G.T., Morris, P.J., Baird, A.J., Gallego-Sala, A.V., Wang, Y., Blaauw, M., Camill, P., Garneau, M., Hardiman, M., Loisel, J., Vӓliranta, M., Anderson, L., Apolinarska, K., Augustijns, F., Aunina, L., Beaulne, J., Bobek, P., Borken, W., Broothaerts, N., Cui, Q.Y., Davies, M.A., Ejarque, A., Farrell, M., Feeser, I., Feurdean, A., Fewster, R.E., Finkelstein, S.A., Gaillard, M.J., Gałka, M., Heffernan, L., Hoevers, R., Jones, M., Juselius-Rajamäki, T., Karofeld, E., Knorr, K.H., Korhola, A., Kupriyanov, D., Kylander, M.E., Lacourse, T., Lamentowicz, M., Lavoie, M., Lemdahl, G., Łuców, D., Magnan, G., Maksims, A., Mansilla, C.A., Marcisz, K., Marinova, E., Mathijssen, P.J.H., Mauquoy, D., Mazei, Y.A., Mazei, N., McCarroll, J., McCulloch, R.D., Milner, A.M., Miras, Y., Mitchell, F.J.G., Novenko, E., Pelletier, N., Peros, M.C., Piilo, S.R., Pilote, L.M., Primeau, G., Rius, D., Robin, V., Robitaille, M., Roland, T.P., Ryberg, E., Sannel, A.B.K., Schittek, K., Servera-Vives, G., Shotyk, W., Słowiński, M., Stivrins, N., Swinnen, W., Thompson, G., Tiunov, A., Tsyganov, A.N., Tuittila, E.S., Verstraeten, G., Wallenius, T., Webb, J., Willard, D., Yu, Z., Zaccone, C. and Zhang, H. 2023, Regional variability in peatland burning at mid-to high-latitudes during the Holocene. Quaternary Science Reviews 305, 108020.
- Swindles, G.T., Watson, E.J., Savov, I.P., Lawson, I.T., Schmidt, A., Hooper, A., Cooper, C.L., Connor, C.B., Gloor, M. and Carrivick, J.L. 2018. Climatic control on Icelandic volcanic activity during the mid-Holocene Geology 46, 47–50.
- Swindles, G.T., Morris, P.J., Whitney, B., Galloway, J.M., Gałka, M., Gallego-Sala, A., Macumber, A.L., Mullan, D., Smith, M.W., Amesbury, M.J., Roland, T.P., Sanei, H., Patterson, R.T., Sanderson, N., Parry, L., Charman, D.J., Lopez, O., Valderamma, E., Watson, E.J., Ivanovic, R.F., Valdes, P.J., Turner, T.E. and Lähteenoja, O. 2018. Ecosystem state shifts during long-term development of an Amazonian peatland]. Global Change Biology 24, 738–757.
- Swindles, G.T., Morris, P.J., Mullan, D., Watson, E.J., Turner, T.E., Roland, T., Amesbury, M.J., Kokfelt, U., Schoning, K., Pratte, S., Gallego-Sala, A., Charman, D.J., Sanderson, N., Garneau, M., Carrivick, J.L., Woulds, C., Holden, J., Parry, L. and Galloway, J.M. 2015. The long-term fate of permafrost peatlands under rapid climate warming . Scientific Reports 5, 17951.
- Swindles, G.T., Roland, T.P. and Ruffell, A. 2023. The ‘Anthropocene’ is most useful as an informal concept. Journal of Quaternary Science 38, 453–454.
