= Ernest Bodell =

Irish cricketer (1928–2003)

Cricket information
- Batting: Right-handed
- Bowling: Right-arm fast-medium

International information
- National side: Ireland

Career statistics
Competition	First-class
Matches	5
Runs scored	25
Batting average	6.25
100s/50s	0/0
Top score	11*
Balls bowled	1,026
Wickets	11
Bowling average	42.18
5 wickets in innings	0
10 wickets in match	0
Best bowling	4/27
Catches/stumpings	1/–
- Source: CricketArchive, 6 December 2022

Ernest Herbert Bodell (17 August 1928 – 16 October 2003) was an Irish cricketer. He was a right-handed batsman and right-arm fast-medium bowler.

He made his debut for Ireland in a first-class match against the Marylebone Cricket Club (MCC) in September 1954. He went on to play for Ireland on six occasions; four further first-class matches against Scotland, the last of which came in June 1959, and a non-first-class match against the MCC at Lord's in August 1957.

As a managing director of Guinness brewery he was at the forefront of business in Ireland ranging from his involvement with Guinness and Murphy's brewery, to the fishing community.

Bodell was married to "Mo" and was father to three daughters, Jane, Olga, and Phillipa, and later a grandfather to eleven children.
