= 2003 Derrybrien landslide =

Landslide in County Galway, Ireland

Coordinates: 53.092°N 8.619°W

The 2003 Derrybrien landslide occurred on 31 October 2003, on the side of Cashlaundrumlahan, a hill near Derrybrien in County Galway, Ireland. It was focused around turbine 68 in the Derrybrien wind farm, and disrupted further construction.

The landslide dislodged 450,000 cubic metres (16,000,000 cu ft) of peat after days of dry weather. While initially coming to rest 2.50 kilometres (1.55 mi) away, it moved further three weeks later when rains came, entering the Derrywee River (Abhainn Da Loilioch), and eventually spilled 20 kilometres (12 mi) away into Lough Cutra. The lake was also the source of the townland of Gort's drinking water, and this caused disruptions to supply. An impact assessment on the wildlife within the lake determined that more than 50 percent of fish in the lake had been killed due to this pollution, about 50,000 fish of all ages and species groups had perished. A smaller peat slide near turbine 17 had occurred prior to the main movement on the 16th but it did not result in the suspension of the construction of the wind turbine farm.

In 2004, the engineering and construction companies (associated with the wind farm development) were convicted of being responsible for the pollution, while the charges against the wind farm company itself were dismissed. In 2008, the European Court of Justice ruled against the Irish government, noting that an environmental impact assessment should have been undertaken before the project was allowed to proceed.

== See also ==
- Wind power in Ireland
