= You're a Star series 5 =

You're a Star
- Series 5
- Hosted by: Keith Duffy; Brian Ormond (Auditions)
- Judges: Thomas Black, Linda Martin, Brendan O'Connor
- Winner: David O'Connor
- Runner-up: 21 Demands

Release
- Original network: RTÉ One
- Original release: 26 November 2006 – 18 March 2007

The fifth series of You're a Star was broadcast in Ireland on RTÉ One from 26 November 2006 until 18 March 2007. David O'Connor from County Wexford beat 21 Demands in the final at The Helix in Dublin. He sang "On Borrowed Wings" which was later released as a download with accompanying physical release. This followed his release of "Don't Look Back in Anger" which entered the top twenty of the Irish Singles Chart.

The series was broadcast on Sunday evenings at 18:30, with the results following later. The live shows began broadcasting on 14 January 2007. The two acts which finished bottom in a public vote during the live shows faced the judges who then decided which one to send home. The series also featured live performances from established acts such as McFly, Shayne Ward and Brian McFadden.

Several acts from the series charted in Ireland. The final four acts all achieved top thirty positions with songs recorded during the 4 March 2007 edition of the show. 21 Demands peaked at number two. The four songs were also released as downloads, the first time this ever happened on a talent show anywhere in the world. 21 Demands enjoyed further success when their debut single, "Give Me a Minute" reached number one by downloads alone, the first time this had ever happened in Ireland. This success contrasted with the series six contestants, all of whom failed to chart.

== Judges and presenters ==
The auditions were presented by Brian Ormond and the live shows were presented by Keith Duffy. Series judges were Thomas Black, Linda Martin (the 1992 Eurovision winner) and Brendan O'Connor (a journalist), with Louis Walsh acting as a judge at one of the auditions held in Dublin.

== Auditions ==
Auditions for the fifth series were held in 2006 in Cork, Galway, Monaghan, Dublin North, and Dublin South. A special audition for bands took place as well. Six acts from each audition were voted upon by viewers. The two acts with the highest number of votes from each audition progressed to the live finals. The Galway auditions were broadcast on 26 November 2006, followed by the Dublin North auditions on 3 December. The Monaghan auditions were broadcast on 10 December.

== Finalists ==
=== 21 Demands ===
21 Demands were an all-male band from Swords (in the Greater Dublin Area). They consisted of Stephen Garrigan, Conor Linnane, Mark Prendergast and Vinny May and had been performing since 2005. They finished the series as runners-up after having a number two single in the Irish Singles Charts.

=== Andy Bennett ===
Andy Bennett was a twenty-eight-year-old clinic secretary from Clontarf, County Dublin. He worked in the National Maternity Hospital in Dublin's Holles Street. Bennett had previously auditioned for the show on two occasions but believed the reason for his lack of progression until series five was "[wearing my] eyebrows down at my bottom".

=== Brian Clarke ===
Brian Clarke was a nineteen-year-old from Monaghan. He was a first year student of anthropology and geography in NUI Maynooth. Clarke had two brothers, one sister, two parents and several pet cats, dogs and horses. He enjoyed art, singing and riding horses. He auditioned in Monaghan where he won the public vote.

=== Shane Downey ===
Shane Downey was an eighteen-year-old multi-instrumentalist from Galway. He could play several instruments, including drums, guitar and piano and had performed as part of the band Reload for several years. Downey, auditioned in Galway, his third such audition for the show. This was the first time he progressed past the first round.

=== Andrew Grafton ===
Andrew Grafton was a 21-year-old student from Dublin. He was studying music at Dundalk Institute of Technology. He auditioned in Dublin North.

=== Alan Kavanagh ===
Alan Kavanagh was an eighteen-year-old sixth year student from Ashbourne, County Meath. He had played guitar since he was nine years of age and performed in a rock band called Attica, whilst also operating as a guitar teacher. He could play bass, piano and write songs too. Kavanagh auditioned in Dublin North.

=== Richie McCoy ===
Richie McCoy was a twenty-seven-year-old singer-songwriter, multi-instrumentalist and account manager from Limerick. He had been performing since he was thirteen years old but began playing music at the age of seven in the Limerick School of Music. He played flute, guitar, piano and four variations of recorders and had already recorded one EP prior to his audition, at which he sang "Just Be You", his own composition. McCoy was also qualified to teach classical flute.

=== David O'Connor ===
David O'Connor was a twenty-six-year-old former racing jockey from Ferns, County Wexford. He had an accident after twenty-five races and went on to represent Ireland in the 2004 Karaoke World Championships in Finland. O'Connor auditioned in Monaghan where he sang "Two Outta Three Ain't Bad" by Meat Loaf and came second in the public vote. He went on to win the series.

=== Maeve O'Donovan ===
Maeve O'Donovan was a sixteen-year-old fifth year schoolgirl when she competed in the fifth series of You're a Star. She was from County Clare and auditioned in Galway. She could play piano and guitar, was inspired by José Feliciano and Loudon Wainwright and was able to write her own songs. Her father was a member of the coaching staff in the Ireland national rugby union team. O'Donovan exited the competition at the semi-final stage as the last female competitor of the series.

=== Susan O'Neill ===
Susan O'Neill was a sixteen-year-old student from Ennis, County Clare. She intended to study music at university.

=== Scuba Dice ===
Scuba Dice were a band from Kilkenny. They consisted of Joe Grace, Padraig King, Owen Murphy and Sean Savage and had been performing since 2003. After auditioning for the fifth series, the band won the Kilkenny Battle of the Bands and supported The Frank and Walters in the Olympia Theatre, Dublin. They were the ninth act to be voted off the show.

=== Ian White ===
Ian White was a nineteen-year-old student from Killiney, County Dublin. He was the first to be voted off during the live shows.

== Live show details ==
=== Week 1 (14 January 2007) ===
Ian White was eliminated. He sang a copy of the Paddy Casey song "Livin'".

=== Week 2 (21 January 2007) ===
The live show began at 18:30. Andrew Grafton was eliminated. He sang the Stevie Wonder song "Lately".

=== Week 3 (28 January 2007) ===
The live show began at 18:30. Susan O'Neill was eliminated.

=== Week 4 (4 February 2007) ===
The live show began at 18:30. Richie McCoy was eliminated. He sang the Bonnie Tyler song "Holding Out for a Hero".

=== Week 5 (11 February 2007) ===
Shane Downey was eliminated.

=== Week 6 (18 February 2007) ===
The live show began at 18:30, with the results show following at 20:30. The performances in week six were based on a David Bowie and Elton John theme. McFly performed "Star Girl", from their album Motion in the Ocean, during the results show. 21 Demands and Andy Bennett were the bottom two acts to face the judges. Thomas Black chose 21 Demands and Brendan O'Connor chose Bennett, with Linda Martin then choosing to remove Bennett from the competition.

=== Week 7 (25 February 2007) ===
The live show began at 18:30. Brian Clarke and Maeve O'Donovan were the bottom two acts to face the judges. Thomas Black chose Clarke and Linda Martin chose O'Donovan, with Brendan O'Connor then choosing to remove Clarke from the competition.

=== Week 8 (4 March 2007) ===
Alan Kavanagh and 21 Demands were the bottom two acts to face the judges. Kavanagh was chosen to leave the show.

=== Week 9 (11 March 2007) ===
The live show began at 18:30, lasting for one hour, with the results show following at 20:30. Brian McFadden performed his single "Like Only a Woman Can". Two songs were sung by each act, with one song being chosen by the judges and one song by the act themselves. Scuba Dice were eliminated.

=== Semi-final (17 March 2007) ===
The semi-final was held on 17 March 2007, with the main show beginning at 20:05 and the results show following at 21:25. Each of the remaining three acts performed two songs, with one of the songs chosen by viewers online. Maeve O'Donovan, the last remaining female, exited the show. She performed "Fake" by The Frames, and "You Belong to Me" by Carly Simon and Michael McDonald. David O'Connor performed "Second Violin" and The Verve song "The Drugs Don't Work", whilst 21 Demands performed "I Will Follow" and "Footloose".

=== Final (18 March 2007) ===
The final was held at The Helix in Dublin on 18 March 2007, with the main show lasting for one hour and beginning at 18:30 and the results show following at 20:30. Shayne Ward performed on the night. David O'Connor defeated 21 Demands to win the final. O'Connor's prizes included a recording contract, a publishing contract and musical equipment to the value of €10,000. O'Connor performed "Love Grows" and "On Borrowed Wings", whilst 21 Demands performed "In The Morning" and "Courtesan".
