= David O'Connor (singer) =

- Origin: Ferns, County Wexford, Ireland

David O'Connor is an Irish singer and former racing jockey from Ferns, County Wexford. He participated in the fifth series of RTÉ One television talent show You're a Star, finishing as the series winner on 18 March 2007. During the show he charted in Ireland with a recording of one of his live performances.

O'Connor previously had a racing career and on one occasion represented Ireland in the Karaoke World Championships.

== Early life ==
His parents are Willie and Martina from Páirc Mhuire.

O'Connor engaged in public performance whilst working as a barman. He was a member of Ferns Dramatic Society, with which he took part in some musicals and variety shows.

== Racing ==
O'Connor, whose passions include horses, was previously a jockey, and has worked with the renowned trainer Colm Murphy. His career was shortened by a back injury in 1998 but he still maintains an active interest as a trainer. In 2008 he was reported to have set up his own training yard.

== Singing ==
=== Karaoke World championships ===
O'Connor finished sixth in the Karaoke World Championships held in Finland in 2004.

=== You're a Star ===
O'Connor won the fifth series of You're A Star which was held in The Helix in Dublin from 2006–2007. He beat rock band 21 Demands in the final, following the semi-final loss of Maeve O'Donovan. His prizes included a recording contract, a publishing contract and musical equipment to the value of €10,000.

O'Connor auditioned in Monaghan where he sang "Two Out of Three Ain't Bad" by Meat Loaf and secured his place in the live shows by coming second in the public vote when the audition was broadcast on 10 December 2006. The two acts with the highest number of votes from each audition progressed to the live finals. He had entered the competition as a way of paying tribute to the recent death of a close friend.

O'Connor performed "Second Violin" and The Verve song "The Drugs Don't Work" in the semi-final on 17 March 2007, whilst his rivals and eventual runners-up 21 Demands performed the U2 song "I Will Follow" and "Footloose".

O'Connor performed "Love Grows" and "On Borrowed Wings" in the final, whilst 21 Demands performed "In The Morning" and "Courtesan". O'Connor sang the Bryan Adams and Eliot Kennedy song "On Borrowed Wings" in the play-off. This was released as a downloadable digital single in Ireland one week after his victory.

O'Connor also enjoyed chart success during the series itself. The week prior to the final, his version of the Oasis song "Don't Look Back in Anger" charted in Ireland's top twenty. This was beaten only by 21 Demands who entered the chart at number two. Tracks by both act were made available for download, alongside one each by Maeve O'Donovan and fourth-placed Scuba Dice. This was the first occasion on which songs from a talent show in Ireland or abroad were made available for download before the series had finished.

=== Post You're a Star ===
O'Connor released the single "Complicated" in December 2007, followed that with another single in February 2008 and launched an album in March 2008. He reported to have been receiving sales of 2,000 as he performed live shows. He began an Irish tour on 6 April 2008 in the Riverside Park Hotel; he was accompanied by a five-piece band, a brass section and a string quartet.

Awards and achievements
Preceded by Lucia Evans	Winner of You're a Star; 2007	Succeeded by Leanne Moore
