= Brian Ormond =

Irish television presenter (born 1979)

- Born: Brian Ormond; 16 August 1979 (age 47); Clondalkin, Dublin, Ireland
- Occupations: Television presenter, singer, businessman
- Years active: 2001–present
- Known for: You're a Star, Pop Idol, Popstars

Brian Ormond (born 16 August 1979) is an Irish television presenter, businessman and reality TV star.

== Early career ==
=== Popstars ===
In 2001 Ormond auditioned for the Irish version of Popstars, the television programme which created the pop band, Six and first introduced the world to Nadine Coyle. Ormond reached the final twelve contestants but was not selected as one of the eventual six members of the group.

=== You're a Star ===
In 2002 Ormond auditioned for the first season of the singing competition show, You're a Star – the winner of which would earn a record deal and the opportunity to represent Ireland at the Eurovision Song Contest. Ormond reached the live shows of the competition after he was selected as judge Louis Walsh's "wildcard". He would go on to eventually finish in sixth place.

=== Pop Idol ===
In 2003 Ormond auditioned for the second season of the British singing competition Pop Idol. After progressing through the audition stages, Ormond was selected as one of the final fifty contestants. On 20 September 2003, Ormond featured in the second 'heat' of the show performing Amazed by Lonestar. Ormond finished in second place in the heat, receiving 16.8% of the public vote and advancing to the top twelve. He featured in the finalists' compilation album, Pop Idol: The Idols – Xmas Factor, with a solo track I Believe. In the first live show, on 25 October, Ormond performed 'A Different Corner' in honour of his musical hero, George Michael. Ormond was saved by the public vote. The following week, Ormond performed 'Honesty' by Billy Joel, however, this would be Ormond's final performance, he was eliminated in a double elimination that evening, ultimately finishing in ninth place.

== Television career ==
In 2005 Ormond returned to You're a Star, this time fronting the 'sidekick' show, You're a Star Plus on RTÉ2 for three years. In 2006, Ormond became host of the audition rounds of the fifth season, with Keith Duffy taking over for the live shows. However, the following year Ormond was made permanent host with Duffy returning as a judge. In 2007, Ormond hosted the third edition of the celebrity version of the show, Charity You're a Star.

From 2006 to 2007 Ormond hosted RTÉ Young Peoples' programme Saturday morning show, S@ttitude alongside Sinead Kennedy and Liam McCormack. From 2007 to 2008, Ormond and Kennedy joined Rob Ross as hosts of the daily Young People's programme ICE. In 2011, Ormond hosted a revamped version of the classic RTÉ music game show, The Lyrics Board called Sing! Later that year, Ormond and his wife-to-be Pippa O'Connor appeared in an authored documentary in the lead up to their wedding day called, Brian and Pippa Get Married. In 2012 Ormond teamed up with Kennedy once again, this time, to take over as hosts of the National Lottery game show The Big Money Game. The show was axed in 2013.

In 2012 Ormond and his wife, Pippa O'Connor appeared as contestants on the fifth season Celebrity Bainisteoir. This season, renamed "Celebrity Bainisteoir: The Rivals" saw Ormond's team face-off against O'Connor's in the first round. O'Connor's team won, meaning Ormond and his team were eliminated.

In 2015 Ormond co-hosted The TV3 Toy Show on TV3 alongside Maria Walsh.

== Other work ==
Ormond is co-owner and director of his wife's fashion brand 'POCO'.

In 2021 Ormond launched his own sustainable footwear brand, 'Movrs'.

== Personal life ==
On 18 June 2011 Ormond married model, Pippa O'Connor in a lavish ceremony in the Ritz Carlton Hotel in County Wicklow. Ormond's best man was his friend and You're a Star winner, Mickey Joe Harte while Big Brother UK winner, Brian Dowling served as O'Connor's honorary bridesmaid. Ormond and O'Connor have three sons together.

Ormond also has a daughter, Chloe, from a previous relationship.

In 2011 Ormond's home was the target of a nail bomb attack.
