= Charity You're a Star =

Television series

You're a Star Charity Special

Charity You're a Star (initially known as You're a Star Charity Special) is a talent contest created by Raidió Teilifís Éireann (RTÉ), in which various Irish celebrities sang to raise money for the charity of their choice. The show was aired live from Dublin City University's theatre, The Helix.

The first (2005) season was named You're a Star Charity Special, which was conceived to be a variation of parent programme You're a Star. However it was more successful that originally thought, so subsequent seasons (in 2006 and 2007) were called Charity You're a Star to imply more independence and permanence.

== You're a Star Charity Special ==
On Tuesday 2 August 2005 (at 21.30 IST), the You're a Star Charity Special made its debut. The special contained eight Irish celebrity contestants who were coached by Twink, the Irish pantomime star. The judging panel consisted of Louis Walsh, Linda Martin and Sunday Independent columnist Brendan O'Connor. The special was presented for two weeks by Derek Mooney.

=== Contestants ===
Name	Known as	Charity
Amanda Brunker	Columnist	Solas, Irish Autism Action
David Mitchell	RTÉ Fair City actor	Temple Street Children's University Hospital
Finian McGrath	Independent TD	Downs Syndrome Ireland
Natasha Nic Gairbheith	Former Miss Ireland	The Donegal Hospice
Liam McCormack	A 'S@ttitude presenter	Our Lady's Children's Hospital, Crumlin
Síle Seoige	TG4 and RTÉ presenter	Cope (homeless organization)
Alan Shortt	Bull Island satirist	National Council for the Blind of Ireland
Geri Maye	Would You Believe presenter	Marie Keating Foundation

On the night of the final (14 August 2005), David Mitchell defeated Finian McGrath via the Irish public vote and won the contest.

== Charity You're a Star, second season ==
Due to the success of the first season, RTÉ and the producers (Screentime ShinAwiL) brought the show back for a second season. There was no change to the judges, presenters or coach. However, unlike the first season, there were ten acts and ten live episodes. Episodes ran from Saturday 29 July until Sunday 13 August 2006. Each night one celebrity was eliminated as a result of receiving the fewest votes from the public.

=== Contestants ===
Name	Known as	Charity
Kathryn Thomas	RTÉ presenter	Special Olympics Ireland
John Aldridge	Former Liverpool and Republic of Ireland football player	Temple Street Children's Hospital
Louis Copeland and Roddy Collins	Fashion designer and Football manager	The Variety Club
Gail Kaneswaren	Model	Our Lady’s Children’s Hospital, Crumlin
Daithí Ó Sé	TG4 weather forecaster	Make A Wish Foundation
Una Crawford O'Brien and Bryan Murray	Fair City actors	The National Children’s Hospital, Tallaght
Shane O'Donoghue	RTÉ sports commentator	The Marie Keating Foundation
Áine Ní Dhroigneáin	TG4 presenter	Cancer Care West
The Politicians: Billy Kelleher TD, Senator Frank Feighan, Dan Boyle TD, Senator Michael McCarthy	Members of the Oireachtas	The Irish Hospice Foundation
Maclean Burke	Fair City actor	The Bubble Gum Club

The final was held on 13 August 2006. The remaining two celebrities were Áine Ní Dhroighneáin and John Aldridge, with Aldridge winning. This was the second time in a row that the person representing Temple Street Children's Hospital won the competition.

== Charity You're a Star, third season ==
The 2007 season saw a change in personnel: Brian Ormond hosted, while the judges were Brendan O'Connor, Amanda Brunker and Bryan McFadden.

Name	Known as	Charity
Shane Byrne	Rugby union player	GOAL
Brent Pope	Rugby union pundit	IRFU Charitable Trust
The Presenters: Sinead Kennedy and Simon Deasy	Children's TV presenters	Crumlin Hospital
Seán Bán Breathnach	RTÉ Raidió na Gaeltachta DJ	Carers Society
Brendan Courtney	TV presenter	The Bubblegum Club
The Roses: Orla Tobin, Róisín Egenton, Orla O'Shea	Former Rose of Tralee winners	Irish Heart Foundation
Joe O'Shea	Seoige and O'Shea presenter	RNLI
Nuala Carey	RTÉ weathergirl	Alzheimer's Society of Ireland
Vivienne Connolly	Model	Temple Street Children's Hospital
The All-Stars: Barney Rock, David Beggy, Jack O'Shea	Former Gaelic footballers	Gary Kelly Cancer Support Centre

The final was held on 12 August 2007. The remaining two celebrities acts were Seán Bán Breathnach and The All Stars. The All Stars were the winners, performing "You Can Leave Your Hat On". The programme raised a record total of €384,520 for the ten Irish charities during its run.
