= Sinéad Sheppard =

Irish politician and entertainer

Cllr Sinéad Sheppard
- Born: Cobh, County Cork, Ireland
- Education: Coláiste an Phiarsaigh
- Occupations: Singer, dancer, television talent judge
- Known for: Membership of Six, county councillor
- Political party: Fine Gael

Sinéad Sheppard is an Irish politician and dancing tutor, and former member of the pop group Six. She rose to fame in the 2001–2002 RTÉ One television series Popstars, in which she was selected as a member of the group. After the band's swift demise, Sheppard formed her own dance school and featured as an advisor to judge John Creedon in the 2009 talent show The All Ireland Talent Show. Since 2009 she has served as a member of local councils in Cork, representing Fine Gael.

== Early life ==
Sheppard is originally from Midleton Street in Cobh, County Cork. She is a fluent Irish speaker having been educated at Coláiste an Phíarsaigh, a gaelscoil in Glanmire, County Cork. Before being discovered by Louis Walsh, she was intending to pursue a career in public relations.

== Career ==
=== Six membership ===
Sheppard was nineteen when she was selected as a member of Six. Her first show as a member of Six was at the ChildLine Concert in the Point Theatre, Dublin, where she performed in front of 8000 people. Six released two multi-platinum selling singles, both of which reached No. 1 in the Irish Singles Chart, and also had a top five album in Ireland. Their first single, "There's a Whole Lot of Loving" is the 3rd fastest-selling single in Irish musical history. Six did an arena tour with Westlife in England, playing a total of sixty-six shows, and two nationwide tours of Ireland.

=== Other musical aspirations ===
Sheppard attempted to audition for the first series of the British-based talent show The X Factor in 2004 alongside fellow Popstars participants Emma O'Driscoll, Andy Orr, Liam McKenna and the runner-up in the first season of the Irish-based talent show You're a Star, Simon Casey.

=== Television career ===
Sheppard featured on The All Ireland Talent Show which began in January 2009. She appeared on 1 February 2009 episode to assist John Creedon in the selection of his five acts to represent The South in the competition, specialising in dance choreography.

== Politics ==
In the 2009 local elections, Sheppard was elected to the town council of Cobh for Fine Gael. At the 2014 local elections, she was elected to Cork County Council for the local electoral area of Cobh. She was re-elected at the 2019 election and at the 2024 election.
