= 7 Up Christmas on Ice =

Ice rink event in Ireland

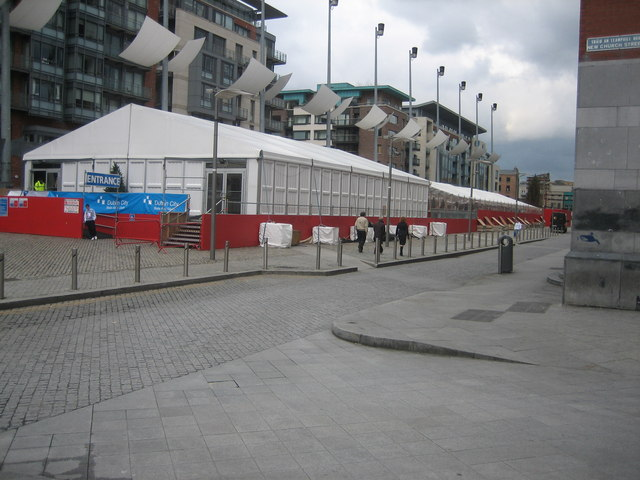
Smithfield on Ice, January 2009

7 Up Christmas on Ice was an annual ice rink event taking place in several towns and cities around Ireland. It was first held in 2002 and the last time in the winter of 2009. In the first year more than 90,000 people attended the event in Smithfield, Dublin. It was the country's first outdoor ice rink. 7 Up took over as main sponsor in 2003 when it was launched by Keith Duffy. It was one of Europe's largest outdoor ice rinks.

Main features were falling snow, a chocolate fountain, skating Santa Claus and disc jockeys. Each session lasts for one hour. It was championed by Gerry Ryan, The Late Late Show and TV3.

The Galway event was known as "Galway Bay on Ice". The 2009 event took place until 10 January 2010 and featured a 700-square-metre (7,500 sq ft) ice rink as well as a Christmas market.

The event came to Letterkenny, County Donegal for the first time in 2008 and returned in 2009. In 2008, the entire event took place across multiple locations: Letterkenny, the RDS in Dublin and the Liffey Valley Shopping Centre.

In 2008, four "celebrities" — Shane Byrne, Patricia McKenna, Lisa Murphy and Brian Ormond — took part for charity in a 7 Up Christmas on Ice "Celebs on Ice" Special which was broadcast live on The Late Late Show on RTÉ One during the last episode before Christmas. €75,000 was raised for their charities.

The 2009 event was launched by Jayne Torvill on 13 November that year.
