= 2006 in Irish television =

The following is a list of events relating to television in Ireland from 2006.

== Events ==
=== January ===
- 16 January – Canwest announces its intention to sell its stake in TV3.

=== March ===
- 6 March – TV3 begins broadcasting in widescreen format on Sky Ireland.
- 27 March – Veteran broadcaster Gay Byrne is appointed as Chairman of the Road Safety Authority.
- March – Launch of Channel 6, replaced by 3E in 2009.
- March – Launch of City Channel Galway.

=== May ===
- 26 May – At its annual general meeting in Belfast Ulster Television plc formally changes its name to UTV plc, taking the decision because it believes that the existing name no longer reflected the full scope of the company's business.

=== August ===
- 23 August – ITV secures a deal to sell its 45% stake in TV3 for £70m.
- 29 August – Scottish Media Group – owners of the STV network – officially rejects a merger offer from Northern Irish ITV franchise holder UTV. The merger approach from would have given SMG shareholders a 52% stake in the combined company.

=== October ===
- 31 October – Sky announces plans to end its nightly Sky News Ireland broadcasts from 30 November.

=== November ===
- 3 November – Ray Kennedy presented the final Sky News Ireland programme at 10.00pm. No further Sky News Ireland bulletins were broadcast after this because the staff walked out.
- 24 November – An edition of The Late Late Show is briefly interrupted by an intruder who makes his way onto the stage to hurl abuse at host Pat Kenny. An individual is arrested and released, but re-arrested on 2 December for driving his car into the entrance of RTÉ's Donnybrook headquarters.

=== December ===
- 4 December – The UK's Channel 4 becomes available to viewers in Ireland via Sky.

=== Unknown ===
- Launch of Setanta Ireland, a channel dedicated to sport, showing both local and international sporting events.

== Debuts ==
=== RTÉ ===
- 6 February – The Podge and Rodge Show on RTÉ Two (2006–2010)
- 13 February – Stardust on RTÉ One (2006)
- 22 February – She-Ra: Princess of Power on RTÉ Two (1985–1986)
- 9 March – The Week in Politics on RTÉ One (2006–present)
- March – Celebrity Jigs 'n' Reels on RTÉ One (2006–2007)
- 23 April – Fallout on RTÉ One (2006)
- 5 June – Test the Nation on RTÉ One
- 4 September – Fifi and the Flowertots on RTÉ Two (2005–2010)
- 10 September – Dan & Becs on RTÉ Two (2006–2007)
- 19 September – Yu-Gi-Oh! GX on RTÉ Two (2004–2008)
- 1 October – One to One on RTÉ One (2006–2009)
- 9 October – Seoige and O'Shea on RTÉ One (2006–2009)
- 27 October – Bratz on RTÉ Two (2005–2008)
- 27 October – Mickey Mouse Clubhouse on RTÉ Two (10 May 2006–6 November 2016)
- 9 November – In Search of the Pope's Children (2006)
- Undated – Anonymous on RTÉ Two (2006–present)
- Undated – The Save-Ums! on RTÉ Two (2003–2006)

=== TV3 ===
- 9 October – The Box (2006)

=== TG4 ===
- 23 September – Foster's Home for Imaginary Friends (2004–2009)
- 2 October – The Doodlebops (2005–2007)
- 31 October – Aifric (2006–2008)

=== Channel 6 ===
- 30 March – Night Shift (2006–2009)
- Undated – American Dad! (2005–present)
- Undated – Blind Justice (2005)

=== BBC ===
- 10 March – Dry Your Eyes on BBC One

== Changes of network affiliation ==
Shows	Moved from	Moved to
Little Monsters	TG4	RTÉ2

== Ongoing television programmes ==
=== 1960s ===
- RTÉ News: Nine O'Clock (1961–present)
- RTÉ News: Six One (1962–present)
- The Late Late Show (1962–present)

=== 1970s ===
- The Late Late Toy Show (1975–present)
- RTÉ News on Two (1978–2014)
- The Sunday Game (1979–present)

=== 1980s ===
- Dempsey's Den (1986–2010)
- Questions and Answers (1986–2009)
- Fair City (1989–present)
- RTÉ News: One O'Clock (1989–present)

=== 1990s ===
- Would You Believe (1990s–present)
- Winning Streak (1990–present)
- Prime Time (1992–present)
- Nuacht RTÉ (1995–present)
- Nuacht TG4 (1996–present)
- Ros na Rún (1996–present)
- The Premiership/Premier Soccer Saturday (1998–2013)
- Sports Tonight (1998–2009)
- TV3 News (1998–present)
- The View (1999–2011)
- Ireland AM (1999–present)
- Telly Bingo (1999–present)

=== 2000s ===
- Nationwide (2000–present)
- TV3 News at 5.30 (2001–present)
- You're a Star (2002–2008)
- Auld Ones (2003–2007)
- Killinaskully (2003–2008)
- The Clinic (2003–2009)
- The Panel (2003–2011)
- Against the Head (2003–present)
- news2day (2003–present)
- Other Voices (2003–present)
- Tubridy Tonight (2004–2009)
- The Afternoon Show (2004–2010)
- Ryan Confidential (2004–2010)
- Dustin's Daily News (2005–2007)
- Naked Camera (2005–2007)
- Saturday Night with Miriam (2005–present)

== Ending this year ==
- 9 January – A Scare at Bedtime (1997–2006)
- 15 February – The Brendan Courtney Show (2005–2006)
- 27 October – The Box (2006)
- 20 November – In Search of the Pope's Children (2006)
- Undated – Fame and Fortune (1996–2006)

== See also ==
- 2006 in Ireland
