= 2006 in Ireland =

- Centuries: 19th; 20th; 21st
- Decades: 1980s; 1990s; 2000s; 2010s; 2020s
- See also: 2006 in Northern Ireland; Other events of 2006; List of years in Ireland

Events from the year 2006 in Ireland.

== Incumbents ==
- President: Mary McAleese
- Taoiseach: Bertie Ahern (FF)
- Tánaiste:
  - Mary Harney (PD) (until 13 September 2006)
  - Michael McDowell (PD) (from 13 September 2006)
- Minister for Finance: Brian Cowen (FF)
- Chief Justice: John L. Murray
- Dáil: 29th
- Seanad: 22nd

== Events ==
- January – A gay town councillor in Gorey, County Wexford, Malcolm Byrne, was the object of a vicious hate campaign which outed him in a local newspaper.
- 9 January – Steve Staunton was appointed the new manager of the Ireland football team, to be mentored by Bobby Robson as International Football Consultantant.
- 17 January – The Gaelic Athletic Association, Football Association of Ireland and Irish Rugby Football Union announced that a deal had been reached which would allow association football and rugby to be played in Croke Park in Dublin.

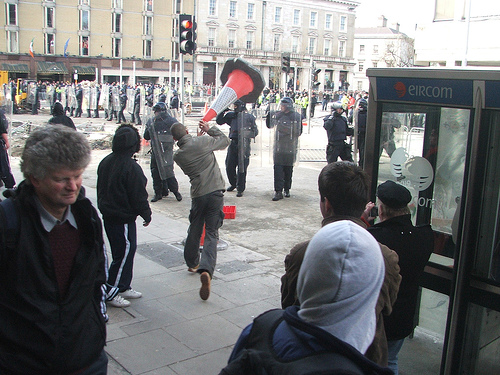
Riots occurred on the streets of Dublin in February.

- 25 February – Rioting occurred in Dublin as Republican protestors condemned the right for a "Love Ulster" (Unionist) parade in the city.
- 11 March – The last competitive rugby international took place at the oldest rugby venue in the world, Lansdowne Road, after 128 years of use, before the ground was redeveloped.
- 17 March – Over 400,000 people took to the streets of Dublin to celebrate Saint Patrick's Day as part of the world's largest Saint Patrick's Day Festival.
- 16 April – Up to 120,000 people lined the streets of Dublin to mark the 90th anniversary of the 1916 Easter Rising.
- 23 April – The 2006 census took place in Ireland.
- 26 April – Prince Philip of the United Kingdom met President Mary McAleese and Taoiseach Bertie Ahern on a visit to Dublin.
- 21 May – Armed Gardaí forcibly removed 30 Afghan refugees who had sought sanctuary in Saint Patrick's Cathedral in Dublin after a one-week hunger-strike
- 24 May – Prime Minister of Australia John Howard formally addressed Dáil Éireann.
- 16 June – The state funeral of the former Taoiseach Charles Haughey took place in Dublin.
- 18 June – The Government announced plans to spend €3.8 billion on scientific research over seven years to grow world-class research capabilities.
- 1 July – President Mary McAleese and leading representatives of all political parties in Ireland, north and south, marked the 90th anniversary of the Battle of the Somme at the Irish National War Memorial Gardens, Dublin.
- 7 July – Dublin Airport was evacuated for the second time in a week when an abandoned suspect package was found.
- 19 July – The warmest temperature since 1976, 32.3 °C (90.14 °F), was recorded at Elphin, County Roscommon. Ireland was one of many countries affected by the 2006 European heat wave. July 2006 was the warmest, on average, since records began in both the Republic and Northern Ireland.
- 19 July – Preliminary 2006 census findings indicated that the population was 4,234,925 million, an increase of 8.6% since 2002 and at its highest since the 1861 census. The total population for the island now stands at just under 6 million (estimates).
- 7 September – Mary Harney resigned as leader of the Progressive Democrats. She led the party since October 1993.
- 11 September – Michael McDowell became leader of the Progressive Democrats by consensus.
- 18 October – Northern Ireland overtook the Republic of Ireland in the FIFA rankings for the first time.
- 14 December – The Zappone v. Revenue Commissioners legal case was decided in the High Court: a same-sex marriage in British Columbia was not recognised as a same-sex marriage in Ireland.

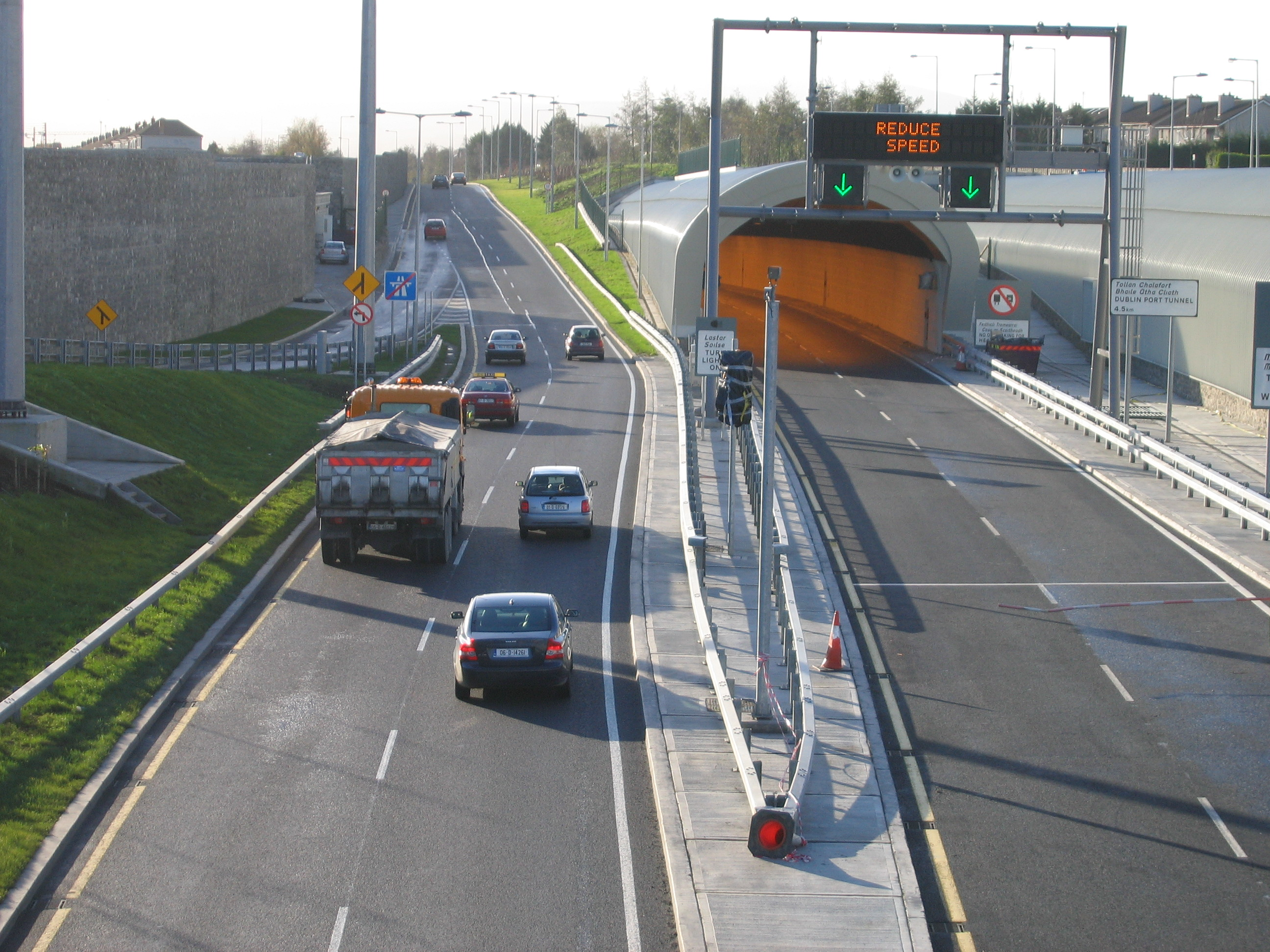
The Dublin Port Tunnel opened in December.

- 20 December – Dublin Port Tunnel officially opened, for heavy goods vehicles only. General traffic was admitted the following 28 January.

=== Full date unknown ===
- The National Biodiversity Data Centre was established in partnership with Waterford Institute of Technology on the institute's west campus

== Arts and literature ==
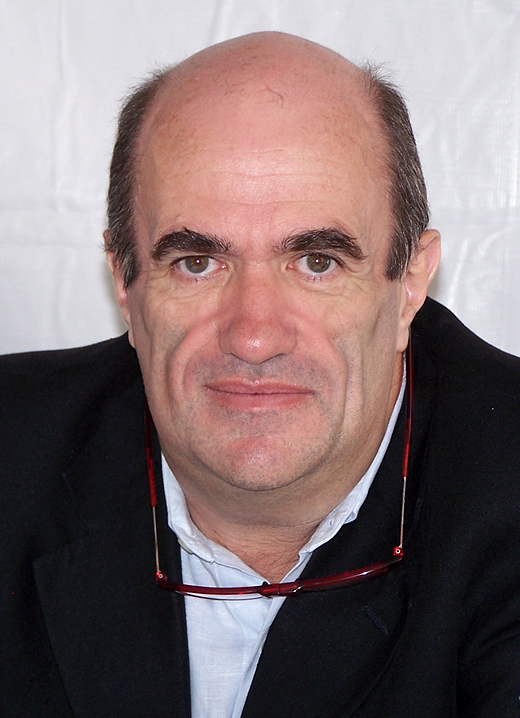
Colm Tóibín became the first Irish writer to win the International Dublin Literary Award, with his novel The Master.

- 5 January – The Boy in the Striped Pyjamas, a young people's novel by John Boyne, was published.
- 2 March – Ireland: Awakening, a historical novel by Edward Rutherfurd, was published.
- June – Ciaran Creagh's play Last Call, based loosely on the hanging of murderer Michael Manning in 1954 as witnessed by the playwright's father, was staged in Mountjoy Prison, Dublin, where it is set.
- 13 June – Colm Tóibín's novel The Master (2004) won the International Dublin Literary Award. He was the first Irish writer to win. His short story collection Mothers and Sons was published this year.
- 26 July – 150th anniversary of the birth of George Bernard Shaw.
- Autumn – Irish language teen drama series Aifric debuted on TG4 television.
- John Banville published his first crime novel under the pen name Benjamin Black, Christine Falls.
- Brian O'Loughlin's sculpture Passage was installed at Pass of Kilbride on the M6 motorway in County Westmeath.

== Sport ==
=== Association football ===
European Championship Qualifiers
Northern Ireland 0–3 Iceland (2 September)
Germany 1–0 Republic of Ireland (2 September)
Northern Ireland 3–2 Spain (6 September)
Denmark 0–0 Northern Ireland (7 October)
Cyprus 5–2 Republic of Ireland (7 October)
Northern Ireland 1–0 Latvia (11 October)
Republic of Ireland 1–1 Czech Republic (11 October)
Republic of Ireland 5–0 San Marino (15 November)

- Setanta Cup
  - Winners: Drogheda United
- League of Ireland
  - Winners: Shelbourne
- FAI Cup
  - Winners: Derry City

=== Athletics ===
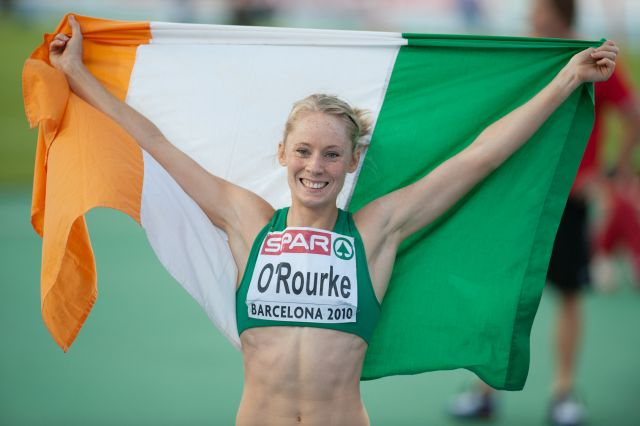
Derval O'Rourke

- Ireland's Derval O'Rourke won the women's 60m hurdles at the 2006 IAAF World Indoor Championships, setting a new national record in the event, and becoming the first Irish woman to win an international senior sprint medal at this level.

=== Gaelic games ===
All-Ireland Senior Football Championship 2006
- Sam Maguire Cup Winners: Kerry

(Kerry 4–15 : 3–5 Mayo)

- Tommy Murphy Cup Winners: Louth

(Louth 3–14 : 1–11 Leitrim)

All-Ireland Senior Hurling Championship 2006
- Liam MacCarthy Cup Winners: Kilkenny

(Kilkenny 1–16 : 1–13 Cork)

- Christy Ring Cup Winners: Antrim

(Antrim 5–13 : 1-07 Carlow)

- Nicky Rackard Cup Winners: Derry

(Derry 5–15 : 1–11 Donegal)

=== Golf ===
- Europe won the 2006 Ryder Cup, held in Kildare Golf and Country Club, Straffan, Co. Kildare from 22 to 24 September.
- Nissan Irish Open was won by Thomas Bjørn (Denmark).

=== Mountaineering ===
- Ian McKeever climbed 26 peaks of the island of Ireland in 98 hours.

=== Olympic Games ===
- Ireland sent four athletes to the Winter Olympics in Turin, Italy.

=== Rugby union ===
- RBS Six Nations Championship
  - Ireland 26–16 Italy
  - France 43–31 Ireland
  - Ireland 31–5 Wales
  - Ireland 15–9 Scotland
  - England 24–28 Ireland

Ireland claimed the triple crown for the second time in 3 years.

- 2005–06 Heineken Cup
  - Munster and Leinster both progressed from the group stages. They played each other in the semi-finals, with Munster claiming victory. Munster then won the championship, defeating Biarritz 23 – 19

== Deaths ==
Proinsias Ó Maonaigh died in March.

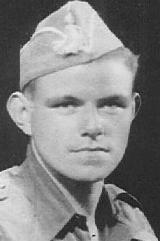
Michael O'Riordan died in May.

January to March
- 1 January – Hugh McLaughlin, publisher and inventor (born 1918).
- 12 January – Brendan Cauldwell, actor (born 1922).
- 15 January – Mella Carroll, former judge of the High Court (born 1934).
- 27 January – Dr. Peter Kavanagh, writer, scholar and publisher (born 1916).
- 31 January – Ruairí Brugha, Fianna Fáil TD, Member of the European Parliament, member of the Seanad (born 1917).
- 5 February – Dermot FitzGerald, businessman and philanthropist (born 1935).
- 23 February – Frank Filgas, cricketer (born 1926).
- 25 March – Bob Carlos Clarke, photographer (born 1950).
- 28 March – Proinsias Ó Maonaigh, fiddle player (born 1922).
- 30 March – John McGahern, writer (born 1934).

April to June

- 4 April – Denis Donaldson, former member of Sinn Féin who was exposed in 2005 as an MI5 spy (born 1950).
- 4 April – John de Courcy Ireland, maritime historian and political activist (born 1911).
- 25 April – John Kerr, singer (b. c1925).
- 11 May – Michael O'Leary, former Tánaiste and Labour Party leader (born 1936).
- 13 May – Desmond Surfleet, cricketer (born 1912).
- 16 May – Clare Boylan, author, journalist and critic (born 1948).
- 18 May – Michael O'Riordan, veteran of the Spanish Civil War and founder of the Communist Party of Ireland (born 1917).
- 26 May – Kevin O'Flanagan, physician, rugby and soccer player and Olympic official (born 1919).
- 19 May – Shay Gibbons, former international soccer player (born 1929).
- 10 June – Bobby Miller, Gaelic footballer and manager (born 1950).
- 13 June – Charles Haughey, former Taoiseach and leader of Fianna Fáil (born 1925).
- 18 June – Luke Belton, former Fine Gael TD (born 1918).
- 20 June – Michael Herbert, former Fianna Fáil TD and MEP (born 1925).
- 21 June – Denis Faul, monsignor, Northern Ireland civil rights activist, chaplain to prisoners in Maze Prison during 1981 Irish Hunger Strike (born 1932).
- 30 June – Dave P. Tyndall, Jr., businessman (born 1917).

July to September

- 5 July – Lewis Glucksman, businessman, philanthropist, patron of the Lewis Glucksman Gallery at UCC (born 1925).
- 7 July – Mícheál Ó Domhnaill, folk and traditional musician (born 1952).
- 8 July – Michael Barrett, former Fianna Fáil TD (born 1927).
- 12 July – Noel Sheridan, 70, actor, artist, Director National College of Art and Design (1979–2003).
- 12 July – Joe Langan, 63, former Mayo Gaelic footballer.
- 23 July – Vere Wynne-Jones, 56, RTÉ broadcaster.
- 28 July – Billy Walsh, soccer player and manager (born 1921).
- 14 August – John Godley, 3rd Baron Kilbracken, author and journalist (born 1920).
- 17 August – Ken Goodall, international rugby player (born 1947).
- 14 September – Seán Ó Tuama, 80, writer and academic.
- 18 September – Seán Clancy, veteran of the Irish War of Independence (born 1901).
- 20 September – Tommy Traynor, soccer player (born 1933).
- September – Mick Haughney, Laois Gaelic footballer.

October to December

- 2 October – Thomas J. Fitzpatrick, former Ceann Comhairle and Fine Gael TD and Cabinet Minister (born 1918).
- 5 October – Jarlath Carey, 74, former Down Gaelic footballer.
- 10 October – Ham Lambert, cricketer and rugby player (born 1910).
- 16 October – Niall Andrews, Fianna Fáil TD and MEP (born 1937).
- 18 October – Liam Bennett, 55, former Wexford hurler.
- 9 November – Sam Stephenson, architect (born 1933).
- 16 November – Frank Durkan, lawyer in the United States (born 1930).
- 18 November – Roger Bolton, trade unionist in UK (born 1947).
- 4 December – Andy O'Brien, Fine Gael senator from County Cavan. (born 1915).
- 16 December – Tony O'Shaughnessy, former Cork hurler.

Full date unknown

- Seán Ó Coisdealbha, poet, playwright and actor (born 1930).
- Jimmy Phelan, Kilkenny hurler (born 1918).

== See also ==
- 2006 in Irish television
