= Una Crawford O'Brien =

Irish actress

- Born: Ireland
- Occupation: Actor
- Partner: Bryan Murray

Una Crawford O'Brien is an Irish actor. Raised in Clondalkin, she is best-known to television viewers as the character Renee Phelan in long-running soap opera Fair City. She played this role, a woman who was the wife of Christy Phelan, for 11 years before being axed in 2009. While working on the show she was interviewed for the special A Fair City for Love.

She appeared on the second season of Charity You're a Star where she sang duets with her Fair City co-star Bryan Murray. The duo were voted off the show after performing Don't Go Breaking My Heart. Since leaving Fair City she has been on stage in Grumpy Old Women. She returned to Fair City in 2012.

== Personal life ==
Her partner is Irish actor Bryan Murray, a father of 5.

== See also ==
- List of Fair City characters
