= Six (group) =

Irish pop group

- Origin: Ireland
- Genres: Pop
- Years active: 2001–2003; 2008–2010
- Labels: BMG; Sony; Epic UK
- Past members: Sinéad Sheppard; Emma O'Driscoll; Sarah Keating; Andy Orr; Kyle Anderson; Liam McKenna; Nadine Coyle

Six were an Irish pop group who formed on the Irish version of the television programme Popstars in 2002. The programme aired on RTÉ One on Sunday nights in the autumn and winter of 2001–2002. The band were signed to Simon Cowell under BMG Records UK and managed by Louis Walsh who also appeared as a judge on the show. Their first single, "There's a Whole Lot of Loving Going On", is currently the fastest and third-biggest selling single in Irish history.

== Career ==
Sinéad Sheppard, Emma O'Driscoll, Kyle Anderson, Sarah Keating, Andy Orr and Liam McKenna were the winners of the show who earned a place in Six. Nadine Coyle was originally selected to be in the band, however was disqualified after it became clear she had lied about her age and that she was only sixteen years old. She was replaced by Keating.

The members of Six released their first single, "There's a Whole Lot of Loving Going On" a cover of the 1975 Guys 'n' Dolls UK #2, in February 2002. The single did very well, selling over 160,000 copies in its first week of sale. The song was then the third best-selling single in Irish chart history. In July 2002, Six released their second single, "Let Me Be the One," which again reached number one on the Irish charts though it sold less than "There's a Whole Lot of Loving Going On". During August 2002, Six went on an Irish tour. The group disbanded in early 2003.

Following Popstars being broadcast in New Zealand, Norway and South Africa, their debut single also charted in these countries, peaking at number six in New Zealand, reaching the top 5 in Norway, Poland and Iceland, and peaking at number two in Sweden.

After the tour, Six's album This Is It was released and debuted at number seven on the Irish charts. Two songs from this album have been covered on the debut album by Same Difference.

== After Six ==
- Emma O'Driscoll became a TV presenter on RTÉ's The Den, She also appeared on Celebrity Jigs 'n' Reels and Celebrity Charity 252 as well as being a DJ on Live 95fm.
- Liam McKenna is a TV presenter and tour manager for Jedward and also did a celeb gossip slot weekly on RTÉ on a Friday afternoon in 2005/2006, and was a lead presenter on music video channel Bubble Hits on Sky Digital.
- Andy Orr managed a band of which Emma O'Driscoll is the lead singer, the band 'Y23'. Orr left the world of showbiz soon afterwards. He moved to London to work at Blackrock in various IT and management roles.
- Sinéad Sheppard has formed her own school of dance in her hometown of Cobh, her dance troop regularly provides the half-time entertainment for League of Ireland First Division side, Cobh Ramblers. She also successfully ran as a Fine Gael candidate in the local elections for Cobh Town Council in June 2009, and was elected to Cork County Council in 2014.
- Kyle Anderson In 2006 Kyle presented TV3 television show Activity Breaks - which was heavily linked to the Irish travel website of the same name, and produced by the You're a Star production company, Screentime ShinAwiL. In 2008 he joined Screentime Shinawil and has been working behind the scenes for hit TV programmes such as The Apprentice and the second series of Dragons' Den. They opened up their UK offices in late 2009.
- Nadine Coyle went on to join Girls Aloud.
