= Lucia Evans =

- Born: 6 February 1982 (age 44)
- Occupation: Singer

Lucia Evans (born 6 February 1982) is an Irish-Zimbabwean singer and winner of the 2006 season of the talent show You're a Star.

== Career ==
Though originally from Bulawayo in Zimbabwe, Evans is now living in Galway, Ireland, working as a full-time vocal coach.

Evans's first single, "Bruised Not Broken", written by Don Black, Wayne Hector and Phill Thornalley and produced by Paul Staveley O'Duffy, was released on Universal Records and entered the Irish Singles Chart at number five on 20 April 2006. The song stayed in the top ten for three weeks.

At the beginning of the 2007, she travelled to Burkina Faso in Africa with an RTÉ crew to make a documentary about children in the developing world. On 16 October 2009, she appeared on The Late Late Show, singing a unique version of Justin Timberlake's "Cry Me A River" from her new album. Also in 2007, Evans released one of her own penned tracks herself MDM Records and in June released "The Other Man", which was written by Evans and produced by Chris O'Brien and Graham Murphy; this peaked at number 17 on the Irish Singles Chart. Evans released this only on iTunes and as an independent artist and the song won critical acclaim. Evans is a trained vocal coach using SLS (Speech Level Singing) Technique which she now teaches as a full-time career.

Evans returned to Africa in the summer of 2009 to present a documentary on what life is like in Africa as a celebrity. African A list won critical acclaim and showed a positive side of African life. Evans released her debut album, Natural Woman, on 16 October 2009 as an independent artist.

In 2013, she began work with the modern version of the Irish Dancing show, River Dance, known as Heartbeat of Home. She is the lead vocalist in the show, also playing a few instruments and joining in some of the dancing.

Awards and achievements
Preceded by Donna and Joseph McCaul	Winner of You're a Star; 2006	Succeeded by David O'Connor
