= A&D Wejchert & Partners Architects =

Architectural practice in Dublin, Ireland

Wejchert Architects, formerly A&D Wejchert & Partners Architects (known as A&D Wejchert Architects) is a firm of architects based in Dublin, Ireland.

== History ==
The company was established in 1974 by Polish husband and wife, Andrzej Wejchert and Danuta Kornaus-Wejchert. Andrzej Wejchert began working in Ireland in 1964 and successfully tendered for the design of the University College Dublin (UCD) campus. He later lectured at the UCD School of Architecture. In 1997, he received an honorary doctorate in laws. Andrzej died in 2009, and Danuta in 2014. Their daughter Agnieszka Wejchert Pearson is also an architect.

Graham Dwyer, convicted in 2015 of the 2012 murder of Elaine O'Hara, was an employee from 2001, and a director from 2007, until his 2013 pre-trial detention. In 2014, Gardaí investigating the murder found two knives at the Wejchert office.

As of 2025, the practice has 5 partners and 2 associates.

== Services ==
The partnership offers architectural, design, estimation, certification, and project management services, including building information modelling.

== Notable projects ==
The practice has produced designs for a number of major capital projects. This has included work for several educational institutions, starting with University College Dublin and including Dublin City University, University College Cork, the University of Limerick, and Waterford Institute of Technology. At UCD they designed major academic buildings and the water tower, and work at DCU included The Helix performing arts centre, one of the largest such facilities in Ireland. The firm has worked on various phases of the Blanchardstown Centre, the largest retail facility, since 1986.

In the 1980s, the firm began to work in Poland; their design for the Sobański Palace was named Best Public Building in Warsaw in 1989. Other notable designs include the Glasnevin Trust Museum.
