= Leanne Moore =

Irish singer

Leanne Moore (born 24 July 1984) is an Irish singer. She is the winner of the 2008 series of You're a Star on Raidió Teilifís Éireann (RTÉ).

Born and raised in Limerick, Moore made it to the final along with fellow contestants Robyn Kavanagh and Deirdre Archibald. For the final, Moore sang "Piece of My Heart", "Run" and "Let's Stay Together". Moore was not favourite to win the competition, despite Louis Walsh stating that she had the most star potential during his appearance as a guest judge.

Her debut single "On Wings" went to number one on the Irish Singles Chart on 27 June 2008. She headlined Limerick Pride Festival 2008 with a packed out concert in Dolans Warehouse and shared her new songs for the first time. She participated in the Irish Eurosong 2010 with the song "Does Heaven Need Much More?".

She has appeared as one of Jedward's backing singers representing Ireland in the Eurovision Song Contest in both 2011 and 2012 and was also a backing singer for Ryan Dolan at the Eurovision Song Contest 2013. She was a member of the Irish jury in the 2014 contest. In 2014, she became a member of the Irish girl band, Liir.

Leanne regularly appears on TV3 entertainment/celebrity programme Xposé with a round-up of news and gossip.

== Personal life ==
Leanne's mother, Chris Moore, had a hit single on the Irish charts in 1993 with "This Time" / "Life Without You". Chris passed away due to cancer the same year.

Moore married her husband David Behan in 2019. The couple had their first child in 2026.

As of 2016 her website reports she works as a wedding singer.
