= Vere Wynne-Jones =

Irish broadcast journalist

Vere Wynne-Jones (29 June 1950 – 23 July 2006) was an Irish broadcaster and journalist who worked as a commentator on both RTÉ radio and television and on the Dublin radio station Q102. Wynne-Jones was originally a teacher, then a broadcast journalist, sports commentator, and latterly a public relations advisor and public relations educator.

== Early life ==
Born in Derry, Wynne-Jones was the son of a Church of Ireland clergyman, Reverend Martin Jones. Through his mother he was related to the de Veres of Curraghchase.

He was educated at Villiers Secondary School in Limerick. Wynne-Jones later attended Trinity College Dublin, where he studied history and political science. He was also editor of the Trinity News.

He became a secondary school teacher and worked at Newpark Comprehensive School, Blackrock, County Dublin, where he played a role in setting up the Transition Year programme at the school (the first in the state).

== Career and later life ==
Wynne-Jones joined RTÉ in 1978, and became a "founding member" of RTÉ 2FM's sports department. He was a member of the RTÉ team that covered the 1988 Seoul Olympics. He also had a number of cameo roles in The Den's Christmas Specials.

He was a member of the Masonic Order and discussed the work of the Freemasons on television.

He was diagnosed with bowel cancer in 2002 and also underwent treatment for liver cancer. He died on 23 July 2006, aged 56.
