= Pop Idol: The Idols – Xmas Factor =

Pop Idol: the Idols - Xmas Factor

Compilation album by Various artists
- Released: 2003
- Recorded: 2003
- Genre: Pop, Christmas
- Label: Sony BMG
- Producer: Nigel Wright, Steve Mac

Pop Idol chronology
Pop Idol: The Big Band Album (2002)	Pop Idol: the Idols - Xmas Factor (2003)

Pop Idol: the Idols - Xmas Factor is a compilation album featuring cover versions of Christmas songs recorded by the final 10 from the second British series of Pop Idol. Their version of "Happy Xmas (War Is Over)" by John Lennon was released in the UK on 15 December 2003. Bookmakers named it their favourite to be the UK Singles Chart Christmas number one, with William Hill offering odds of 8/13. The song ultimately peaked at number five on the Christmas chart.

== Track listing ==
1. "Happy Xmas (War Is Over)"
2. "All I Want for Christmas"
3. "Santa Claus Is Coming to Town"
4. "Oh Holy Night"
5. "Santa Baby"
6. "Blue Christmas"
7. "White Christmas"
8. "Rockin' Around the Christmas Tree"
9. "Silent Night"
10. "I Believe"
11. "Mary's Boy Child"
12. "When a Child Is Born"
13. "Last Christmas"
14. "On This Day"
