= The Box (Irish TV series) =

- Genre: Light entertainment
- Created by: Adam Wood
- Directed by: Ralph Spark
- Presented by: Keith Duffy
- Starring: Zoe Comyns
- Country of origin: Ireland
- Original language: English
- No. of series: 1
- No. of episodes: 15

Production
- Executive producers: Paul Bent; Mark Nolan; Adam Wood
- Production locations: Wolfe Tone Square, Dublin, Ireland
- Camera setup: Multi-camera
- Running time: 30–60 minutes
- Production companies: Lion TV; Lotus Film

Original release
- Network: TV3
- Release: 9 October – 27 October 2006

The Box is an Irish quiz show presented by Keith Duffy. It was first broadcast on TV3 on 9 October 2006 and aired for one series until 27 October 2006.

The Box was described as a reality quiz show where the contestants had to live in an isolated glass box in the middle of Dublin. During the day the two contestants worked together to build up a pot of money and every night they battled against each other to see who got to keep the money.
