= Louis Copeland & Sons =

Clothing retail business in Ireland

- Company type: Private
- Industry: Retail
- Founded: 1933
- Founders: Hyman Coplan
- Headquarters: 39-41 Capel Street, Dublin, Ireland
- Area served: Ireland
- Products: Menswear and bespoke tailoring
- Owner: Louis and Adrian Copeland

Louis Copeland & Sons is a fourth-generation Irish premium menswear retailer and bespoke tailor. Its headquarters are at 39-41 Capel Street, Dublin, Ireland and it has seven stores across Ireland.

== History ==
The original business was founded by Hyman Coplan, a Lithuanian Jewish immigrant who came to Dublin in the early 1900s. By the census of 1911, Hyman was 24 and was using the anglicized name Copeland rather than Coplan and living as a boarder with the Woolfson family, who were also Dublin retailers of Russian Jewish origin. His occupation was listed as tailor.

In 1933, the current business was established by Hyman's son Louis Copeland.

The current owners, the second Louis Copeland and his brother Adrian, took over the business from their father in the 1970s. In 2009, their own sons, also called Louis and Adrian, took over the running of the business.
