= Emma O'Driscoll =

Irish dancer and musician, and television presenter

- Born: 23 March 1982 (age 44); Limerick, Ireland
- Occupation: Television presenter
- Known for: Membership of Six
- Spouse: Liam Cronin
- Website: Emma O'Driscoll; TV.com

Emma Louise O'Driscoll (born 23 March 1982) is a former Irish pop star, turned children's television presenter and reality television personality.

O'Driscoll rose to fame in the 2001–2002 RTÉ One television series Popstars, in which she was selected as a member of the band Six. After the band's swift demise, O'Driscoll replaced Mary Kingston as presenter of the morning show, The Disney Club. Among other countless television appearances since then, she finished runner-up in the RTÉ reality television shows, Charity 252. She has also appeared on a stamp.

== Early life ==
O'Driscoll was born in Limerick and raised there alongside her two sisters, Julie and Georgina and her brother, Stephen. She developed an early interest in song and dance. She has received a Blue Peter Badge and has won hip hop and freestyling championship titles in Ireland and Europe. Whilst attending the Presentation Secondary School in Sexton Street, Limerick, she began her initial move to enter Popstars. She spent her spare time in the Dominican Choir and the Bunratty Castle Singers, learning her dance skills at Shape Dancing School and as a member of the Limerick dance troupe, High Voltage. She initially wished to be a primary school teacher before she discovered she had been chosen as a member of Six. Her interest in teaching led to her working as a Special Needs Assistant in Our Lady Queen of Peace National School.

== Career ==
=== Six membership ===
Her first show as a member of Six was at the ChildLine Concert in the Point Theatre, Dublin, where she performed in front of 8000 people. Six released two multi-platinum selling singles, both of which reached #1 in the Irish Singles Chart, and also had a top five album in Ireland. Their first single, "Whole Lot of Loving" is still the fastest-selling single in Irish musical history. Six did an arena tour with Westlife in England, playing a total of sixty-six shows, and two nationwide tours of Ireland.

=== Television ===
O'Driscoll was one of seven celebrities who took part in the reality series, Charity 252, performed for the People in Need Telethon in May 2004. They were given a radio station to run 14 hours per day, with cameras watching their every move, and their progress was shown each night for a week on RTÉ Network 2. She initially turned down the offer of partaking in the reality television show. The series earned her a radio slot, co-hosting the breakfast show on Live 95FM. During the Christmas period, O'Driscoll played herself in the pantomime Snow White in the University Concert Hall in Limerick.

Her time in children's television has seen her present The Disney Club and Den Tots. She also made guest appearances on The Cafe and Dustin's Daily News.

In 2006, O'Driscoll featured in Celebrity Jigs 'n' Reels.

In 2009, O'Driscoll participated in RTÉ's reality sports show Celebrity Bainisteoir. She bought her team to the semi-finals of the competition.

In 2010, she appeared as a guest judge on The All Ireland Talent Show, with John Creedon for the South's regional auditions round.

=== Appearance on a stamp ===
Marking RTÉ's 50th anniversary in 2011, O'Driscoll appeared on a postage stamp, part of a set of three that also featured Gay Byrne and Anne Doyle.

== See also ==
- List of people on the postage stamps of Ireland
