= David Mitchell (Irish actor) =

Irish actor

David Mitchell is an Irish actor known for playing Jimmy Doyle in soap opera Fair City for 17 years And Again In 2024

Mitchell was born in Dublin. His parents are Ann Fitzpatrick and Paddy Mitchell. His family home is in Finglas, Dublin. Mitchell now drives a taxi in Dublin. He won RTÉ's You're a Star Charity Special, a talent contest in which he defeated seven other celebrities.

== Selected filmography ==
- Grey Angel Journals: 2017
- You're a Star Charity Special: 2005
- Fair City: 1991-2008, 2024

== See also ==
- List of Fair City characters
- List of longest-serving soap opera actors#Ireland
