= Thomas Black (TV personality) =

Irish record label executive

Thomas Black is a former Irish record label executive and TV personality.

He worked at EMI Records Ireland as A&R director, where he signed artists like Relish, Aslan, Cathy Davey and John Spillane. He previously worked for Sony Records in the same position, signing The 4 of Us and Cry Before Dawn to the label.

Black was one of the three judges on the TV talent show You're a Star where he discovered and championed Dublin band 21 DEMANDS who made Irish chart history by becoming the first unsigned artist to achieve a number one single, the band subsequently changed their name to Kodaline, signing to Sony Records. Their debut album In a Perfect World went to No.1 in Ireland and number 3 in the UK charts in 2013. He also set up Ireland's only independent A&R consultancy service in 2004 working with unsigned and established artists, such as The Star Parade, who are seeking record and publishing deals as well as consulting for various UK and US record and publishing companies including Polydor Records, Sony Music Publishing, TV and radio including RTÉ and Newstalk.

Alongside Linda Martin and Brendan O'Connor, Black was one of the guests about to be interviewed by Pat Kenny when Kenny famously came under attack from an intruder live on The Late Late Show. Thomas Black produced a radio documentary for RTÉ Doc on One series called '007 The Irish Connection'. This Documentary won a Gold award at the NewYorkFestivals.com Worlds Best radio awards in 2018.
