= Popstars (Irish TV series) =

- Genre: Reality television
- Created by: Jonathan Dowling
- Presented by: Ali White
- Judges: Louis Walsh; Linda Martin; Bill Hughes
- Country of origin: Ireland
- Original language: English
- No. of seasons: 1
- No. of episodes: 13

Production
- Executive producer: Jonathan Dowling
- Running time: 30–90 minutes

Original release
- Release: 15 November 2001 – 17 February 2002

Related
- Popstars

Popstars is an Irish reality television series, broadcast and produced by RTÉ One, which ran from 2001 to 2002. The programme is based on the original New Zealand series and is part of the international Popstars franchise. The series follows members of the public auditioning to be part of a new band, with the age minimum being 18 years old.

The judging panel included band manager and television personality Louis Walsh, singer-songwriter Linda Martin and music executive Bill Hughes. The programme was broadcast on a weekly basis; starting on 15 November 2001 and ending on 17 February 2002. Following the conclusion of the series, Walsh became a judge on the second incarnation of the UK counterpart, titled Popstars: The Rivals.

== Production ==
Following the success of Popstars: New Zealand, producers of the show decided to launch the show as an international franchise, with an Irish edition ordered in earlier 2001. Jonathan Dowling later signed on as creator and showrunner of the show, under the working title, Popstars: Ireland, which was later changed to Irish Popstars, before being changed once again to simply Popstars. Dowling decided to sign Boyzone manager and television personality Louis Walsh, Eurovision-winner Linda Martin and international music executive Bill Hughes to be seated as the judges on the programme.

Producers planned to have the series to be aired during the summer of 2001, however the series did not premiere until 15 November, broadcasting during the 2001–02 television season, with 13 weekly episodes ordered. The first season concluded on 17 February 2002, with the series' band being named Six, with Sinéad Sheppard, Emma O'Driscoll, Kyle Anderson, Sarah Keating, Andy Orr and Liam McKenna being elected as the band members.

The series is infamous for the then-16-year old Nadine Coyle's appearance on the show; she was initially inducted into the band after the auditions, but was later asked to leave the show as it emerged she had lied about being 18 in order to participate; she was then replaced by Keating, who originally did not make it into the band.

In mid-2002, it was announced that the show had been cancelled after just one season and would be replaced by new singing competition, You're a Star. Walsh meanwhile became a judge on the second incarnation of the UK series, titled Popstars: The Rivals, which aimed to create a girl group and a boyband who would compete for that year's Christmas number one spot on the UK Singles Chart. With Walsh's encouragement, Coyle auditioned for the show and was voted by the public into the girl group Girls Aloud, managed by Walsh, eventually winning the competition with their song "Sound of the Underground".

== Episodes ==
The series contained 13 episodes. RTE released a 2-hour "feature length movie" compilation version of the series on VHS in 2002. It was never reissued or rebroadcast in Ireland, however the series was broadcast on ITV in the UK during the Saturday morning children's television programme, SMTV Live.

No.	Title	Production	Time slot	Original release date	Source
1	"Auditions"	101	Saturday 9:00 pm	15 November 2001	
The auditions kick off all around Ireland, in cities including Dublin and Sligo. The judges take interest into particular auditionee Nadine Coyle – but what is she who she says she is?
2	"Top Artists Revealed"	102	Saturday 9:00 pm	22 November 2001	
The top artists are revealed, which includes the incredible Nadine Coyle. The judges give the contestants hard challenges to complete to prove they have what it takes to join the future band.
3	"The First Performances"	103	Saturday 9:00 pm	29 November 2001	
The contestants prepare for their first live performances, but will nerves get the better of them? The judges take to their judging desk again to judge what they think of the hopeful's performances.
4	"The Second Songs"	104	Saturday 9:00 pm	6 December 2001	
It's the second week of the performances, and the hopefuls prepare for their amazing performances. The judges decide to take it easy on the contestants as they are underpressure.
5	"Week Three"	105	Saturday 9:00 pm	13 December 2001	
As the live performances continue, the third week is getting the contestants settled in, as they take to the stage with extraordinary performances.
6	"The Fourth Week Goes"	106	Saturday 9:00 pm	20 December 2001	
The fourth week continues and the contestants have been getting stronger every week. But is there something going on with Nadine Coyle?
7	"The Truth Comes Out"	107	Saturday 9:00 pm	27 December 2001	
The truth comes out for Nadine, and the contestants are one short. The judges decide to give the contestants challenging songs to prove their vocal ability and their true ability as singers.
8	"2001 Goes, 2002 Comes"	108	Saturday 9:00 pm	3 January 2002	
To celebrate the new year, the contestants are allowed to pick their own songs - their favourites from 2001.
9	"Another Week, Number 7"	109	Saturday 9:00 pm	10 January 2002	
The seventh week goes on, and the competition is even tougher than before. With secret song choices selected by the judges, it's up to the contestants to prove their worthy enough.
10	"Live Week Eight"	110	Saturday 9:00 pm	17 January 2002	
The live performances continue, and it's the eighth week already! The remaining contestants must prove that they really want to win the competition.
11	"The Quarter Final"	111	Saturday 9:00 pm	31 January 2002	
So close to the final, the quarters begin and the competition is tougher than ever. And the results show the hopeful's futures in the competition.
12	"The Semi Final"	112	Saturday 9:00 pm	7 February 2002	
The semi finals begin and it's so close to the final. But who is safe and who is going home tonight?
13	"The Live Grand Final"	113	Tuesday 9:00pm	17 February 2002	
It's the live grand finale, but who will be joining the band? The band's name is revealed as Six, and the top 6 band members are revealed, during the live results show.
