= Scuba Dice =

Irish pop punk and punk rock band

- Origin: Kilkenny, Wexford, Ireland
- Genres: Pop punk; punk rock
- Years active: 2003–2011
- Label: Independent
- Past members: Sean Savage; Eoin Murphy; Joe Grace; Padraig King; Liam Bryne; Shane Pearson; Daire Nolan
- Website: scubadice.com

Scuba Dice were an Irish pop punk and punk rock band who gained national attention after participating in the 2007 series of the singing contest You're A Star.

== History ==
=== Formation (2003–2007) ===
The band formed in 2003 and gained a following in Ireland for their live shows and original material. After entering the 2006 Hype Entertainment Battle of the Bands and winning, the band released a self-titled EP, then opened for The Frank and Walters at a gig at the Olympia Theatre, featuring Des Foley of Mr Lightweight as an additional guitarist. In early 2007 Scuba Dice made their television debut as contestants in the national TV show You're a Star, with Brendan O'Connor defining their sound as "power pop, punk, punk pop". The band competed for the coveted prize of a record contract and as part of the show they covered Green Day's "Holiday", which was released as a single and reached No. 8 and on the Irish Singles Chart, later becoming the 42nd best selling single of 2008 for an Irish artist. They also released their second single "Made", an original song, as a physical release. The band also entered the Beatbox competition house to write a song with the contestants.

=== Two founding members leave (2007–2010) ===
It was around this time that Eoin 'Spud' Murphy left the band due to interpersonal conflict within the band and was replaced by the band's roadie and guitar tech Liam Bryne. Shortly after this the band announced that Sean Savage (the band's original drummer) was no longer a member on their Bebo and MySpace pages, which resulted in angry exchanges through each other's blogs. This temporarily left the band drummer-less before they recruited Pat Byrne, a member of Mr Lightweight, to play the drums for them on their fourth demo, and the single "Let Go". After this the band recruited drummer Daire Nolan. The band planned to release "Just Dance", a song from their third demo, as a single through iTunes; while the date had been set, the single was not released.

In August 2008 the band took part in LA or Busk, a competition open to unsigned Irish bands. The competition, ran by Blastspace, consisted of 8 heats, each heat consisting of ten of Ireland's best young bands. Scuba Dice went on to finish third in the final. A new single, titled "Let Go", was released on 13 February 2009 as a digital download available through DownloadMusic.ie. The band organized their first headlining Irish tour in February 2009 with 10 shows in 9 days to promote "Let Go" with "Under Stars & Gutters".

In the summer of 2009 Scuba Dice embarked on a short tour of Ireland with All or Nothing for three dates of their tour and another three dates with Jody Has A Hitlist Keywest, and Snakes Hate Fire. Scuba Dice also played on the main stage of the Dithmarscher Rock Festival 2009 in Germany. Later in 2009, Scuba Dice embarked on their first tour of America, where they played four showcase shows and earned positive reviews.

=== 2010–2011: The Lost Art of Romance ===
In the summer of 2010, between 25 June and 3 July, the band embarked on a headline tour around Ireland taking in places such as Wexford, Galway City, Cork City, Limerick City, Mayo, Louth and Antrim. The band also supported My Passion, Canterbury, One Night Only and Francesqa around Ireland. They also performed three headline Halloween shows around Ireland in Cork City, Limerick City, and Dublin. Scuba Dice then supported Paramore at The O2 in Dublin on 6 November 2010. They played a 30-minute set and were very well received. Scuba Dice then took time off to prepare for their Summer 2011 tour which included six dates in Ireland as well as dates in Austria, Sweden and Germany. They then began working on their first studio album, and released the EP The Lost Art of Romance in April 2011.

Lead singer Joe Grace later moved in Australia and the band's website was shut down, with their Facebook also becoming inactive after early 2012. No official news of the band's dissolution or a hiatus was released.

== Members ==
Members

- Joe Grace – lead vocals, rhythm guitar (2003–present)
- Padraig King – lead guitar, backing vocals (2003–present)
- Liam Byrne – bass, backing vocals (2007–present)
- Shane Pearson – drums, percussion (2010–present)

Former members

- Eoin Murphy – bass (2003–2007)
- Sean Savage – drums (2003–2008)
- Daire Nolan – drums (2008–2010)

== Discography ==
Scuba Dice discography
- Extended plays: 3
- Singles: 3
- Music videos: 2

=== Extended plays ===
Year	Album details	Peak chart positions
Year	Album details	IRL
2006	Scuba Dice EP (also released as Demo 2): Released: 2006; Label: Self-released; Format: Download	—
2008	Scuba Dice EP 2 (also released as Demo 3): Released: 2008; Label: Self-released; Format: Download	—
2011	The Lost Art of Romance: Released: 1 April 2011; Label: Self-released; Format: Download	—
"—" denotes a title that did not chart.

=== Demos ===
Year	Title	Tracks
2005	Demo 1	1. "Nothin's Free"; 2. "Let Go"
2008	Demo 4	

=== Singles ===
Year	Single	Peak chart position
Year	Single	IRL
2006	"Holiday"	8
2006	"Made"	—
2009	"Let Go"	—
2011	"Not That I Care"	—
"—" denotes a title that did not chart.
