= The Helix, Dublin =

Building in Dublin, Ireland

The Helix
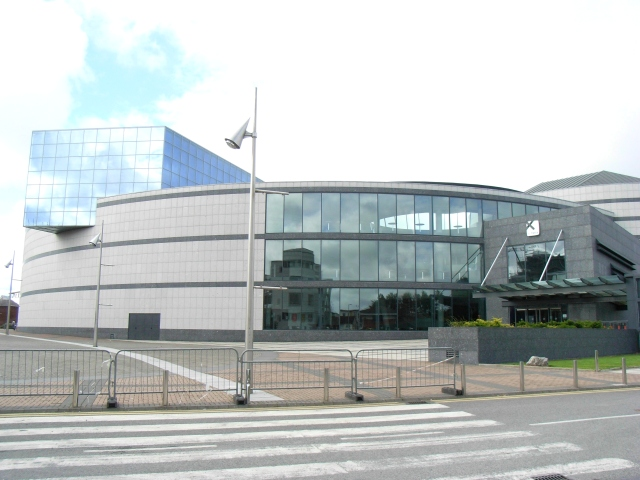
- The Helix in August 2007
- Interactive map of The Helix
- Full name: The Helix Centre for the Performing Arts
- Former names: North Dublin Arts Centre
- Address: DCU Main Campus, Collins Avenue Extension; Dublin D9; D09 FW22; Ireland
- Location: Glasnevin
- Coordinates: 53°23′11″N 6°15′34″W
- Owner: Dublin City University
- Operator: UAC Management DAC, a DCU subsidiary company
- Capacity: 1,300 (Mahony Hall); 433 (Helix Theatre); 132 (The Space)

Construction
- Groundbreaking: August 2000
- Opened: 21 October 2002
- Cost: €36.5 million
- Architect: Wejchert Architects
- Project managers: Healy Kelly & Partners
- General contractor: Bennett Construction

Website
- thehelix.ie

The Helix, formally The Helix Centre for the Performing Arts, is a multi-purpose venue located on the Dublin City University main campus in Glasnevin, Dublin. Officially opened by then President of Ireland, Mary McAleese, on 16 October 2002, the Helix contains a concert hall, theatre, studio theatre, exhibition space, artists-in-residence studios, and a green room and other support spaces, along with an in-site café.

== History ==
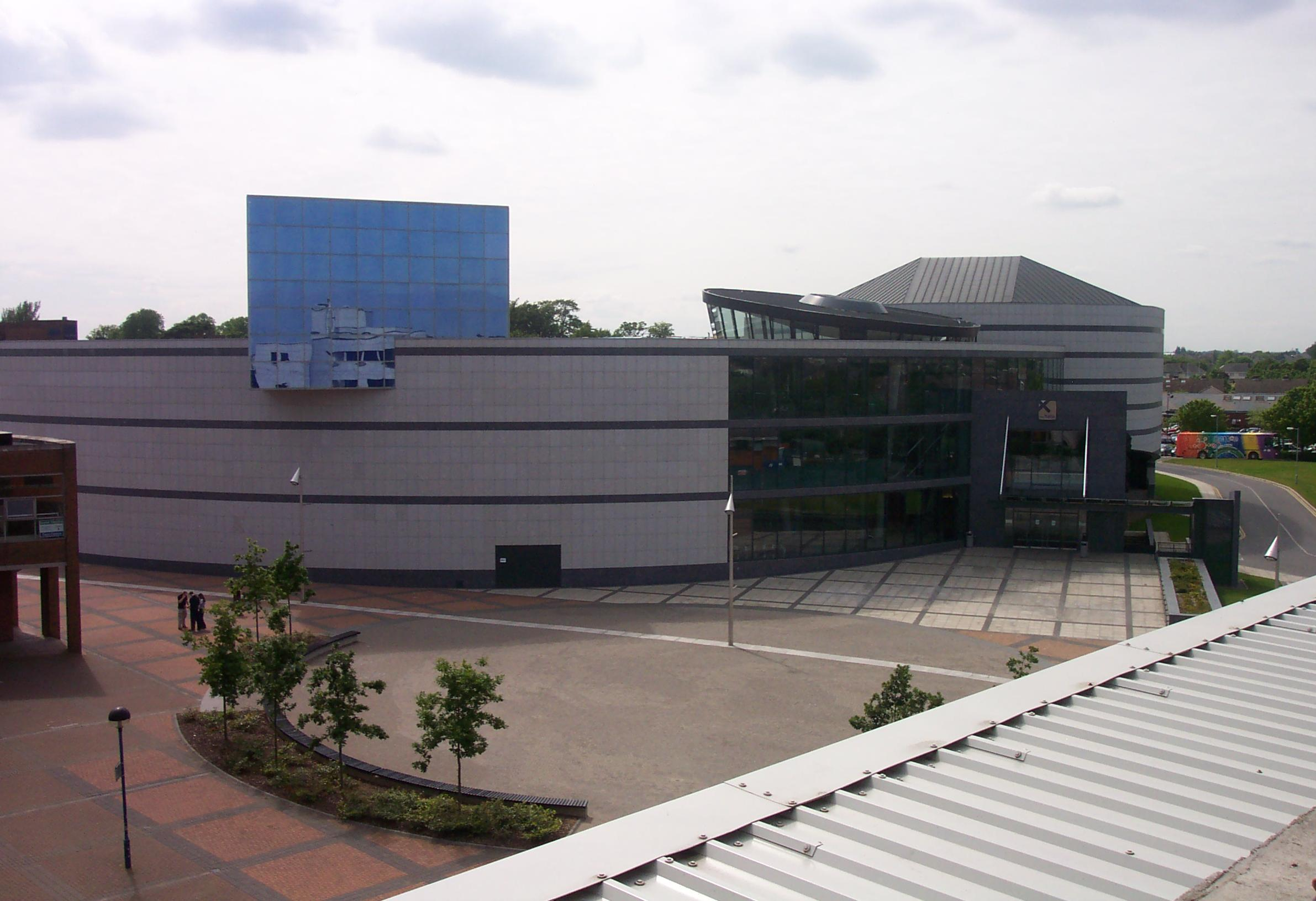
The Helix in June 2005

Originally conceived as an aula maxima for the university, and also as the "North Dublin (Performing) Arts Centre", the Helix was built at a cost of €56.5 million between 1996 and mid-1998.

== Design and features ==
The Helix was designed by the late Polish-born Dublin-based architect Andrzej Wejchert of A&D Wejchert & Partners Architects. It is a three-level building with elevations of contrasting glass and granite, and with an open void through which light spills from the roof. The 11,650 square metres of the building are built around a wide foyer with inclined columns and a helix-shaped stairway—the building was named for the helical structure that dominates the entrance.

The performance spaces include the main concert hall, "The O'Mahony Hall", main Helix theatre, "The Space"—a studio theatre, exhibition space, artists-in-residence studios, and a green room, while ancillary spaces include a café, box office, small shop, toilets and other amenities.

== Performances and events ==
The Helix has been host to world-class performances ranging from Zach Bryan, the Russian State Philharmonic Orchestra, The St Petersburg Ballet, international theatre and world singers through to popular West End shows. Opera singers performing have included Dame Kiri Te Kanawa, Lesley Garrett and Bryn Terfel. Rock musicians Van Morrison and Lou Reed have also played at the venue. Irish groups such as Celtic Thunder have also performed there.

== Non-Entertainment Uses ==
During the COVID-19 pandemic the space was used as a vaccination centre beginning in February 2021. The capacity of the car park was a factor in choosing the building. The vaccination centre was the work of collaboration between general practitioners, practice nurses, medical students, Order of Malta Ambulance Corps, Order of Malta Ambulance Corps, Department of Health, Dublin City University and Dublin Airport.

The university routinely uses Mahony Hall as a graduation ceremony venue.

== TV programmes ==
Many TV programmes have been broadcast from or recorded in The Helix.

Programme	Channel	Years
You're a Star	RTÉ One	2002–2008
The Dunphy Show	TV3	2003
The Panel	Network 2	2003
Rip-Off Republic	RTÉ One	2005
Fame: The Musical	RTÉ One	2010
Take Me Out	TV3	2010–2013
Family Fortunes	TV3	2012–2014
The Voice of Ireland	RTÉ One	2012–2016
Ireland's Got Talent	Virgin Media One	2018–2019

== Awards ==
- Irish Concrete Society Award – Building Category
- Irish Joinery Award – Joinery of the Mahony Hall – 1st Prize
- Plan Opus Building Awards Winner (2003)
- Shortlisted for the Best Purpose-built Venue (2014)
