= Keith Duffy =

Irish singer, actor, radio and television presenter and drummer (born 1974)

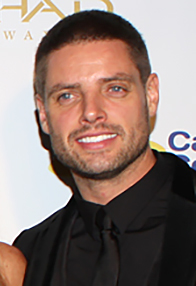
- Duffy in 2012
- Born: Keith Peter Thomas Francis John Duffy; 1 October 1974 (age 51); Donaghmede, Dublin, Ireland
- Occupations: Singer, actor, drummer, television presenter
- Spouse: Lisa Smith (m. 1998)
- Children: 2
- Musical career
- Genres: Pop, rock
- Years active: 1993–present
- Labels: Universal; Warner Bros.
- Member of: Boyzlife
- Formerly of: Boyzone; Keith 'N' Shane

Keith Peter Thomas Francis Julian John Duffy (born 1 October 1974) is an Irish singer, actor, radio and television presenter and drummer who began his professional music career as part of Irish boy band Boyzone alongside Ronan Keating, Mikey Graham, Shane Lynch and Stephen Gately in 1993. The band decided to focus on solo projects in 2000, since which Duffy has taken acting roles in soap operas such as Coronation Street and Fair City. He has also presented The Box and You're a Star.

Duffy has been an autism awareness campaigner since his daughter was diagnosed with the condition at 18 months old. He serves as a patron of Irish Autism Action, hosting fundraising events and informational talks.

Duffy was the winner on the British reality series The Door in 2010 and came third in the first series of Celebrity Big Brother in 2001, and in the second series of Splash! in 2014.

== Early life ==
Duffy was born on 1 October 1974 in Donaghmede, Dublin to parents Sean and Pat. He has an older brother, Derek, and a younger brother, John. He was raised Roman Catholic. As a young child he contracted pneumonia. He attended primary school at Belgrove National School and secondary school at Ardscoil Rís and Plunket's. Between the ages of 7 and 18 he played hurling and Gaelic football, representing the Dublin under-16 hurling team for three years. At the age of 16 he bought a drum kit and played in bands called Toledo Moon and This Burning Effigy. Duffy studied architecture for a year at college, before dropping out.

== Career ==
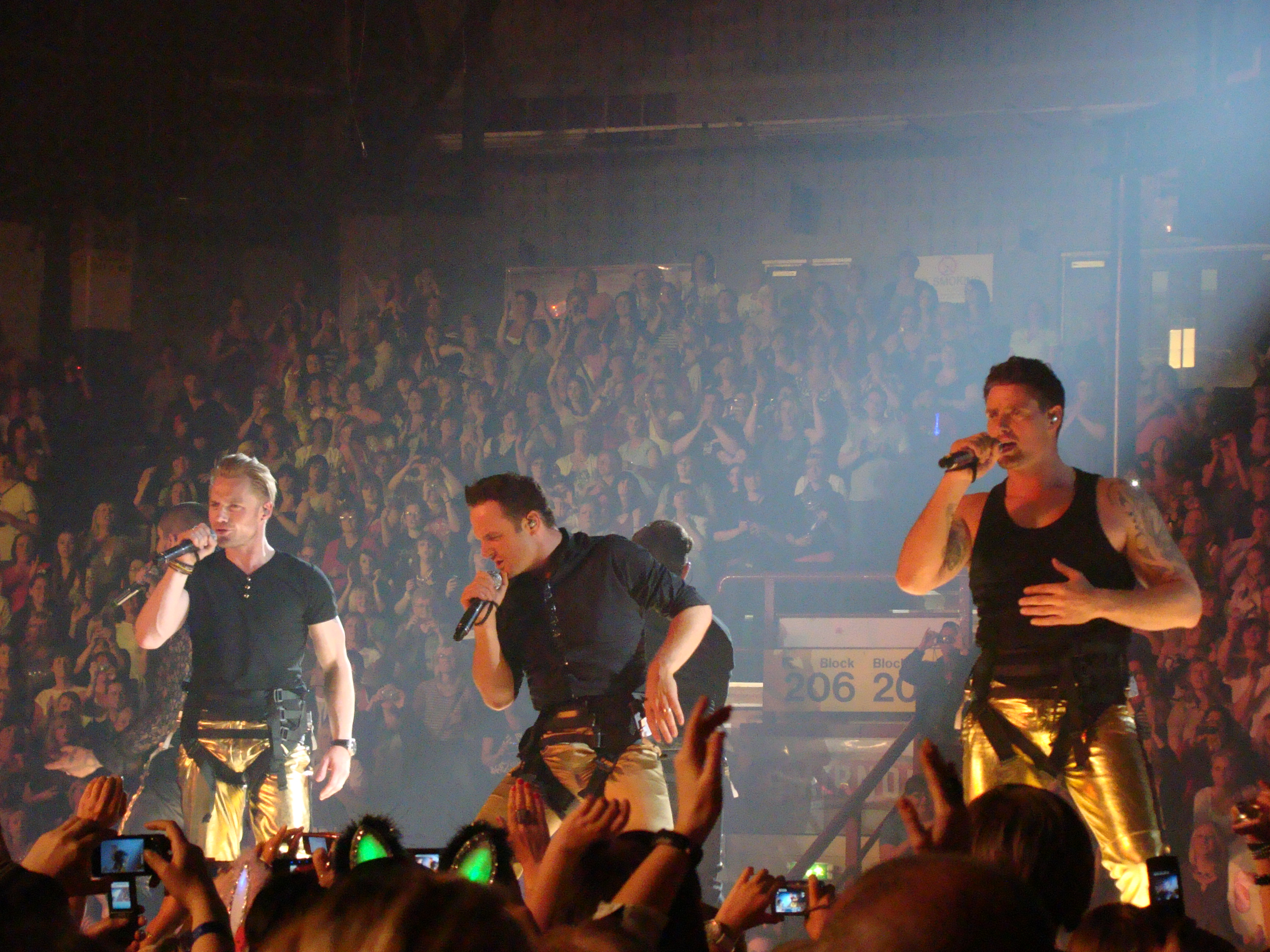
Duffy (right) performing with Boyzone in 2009

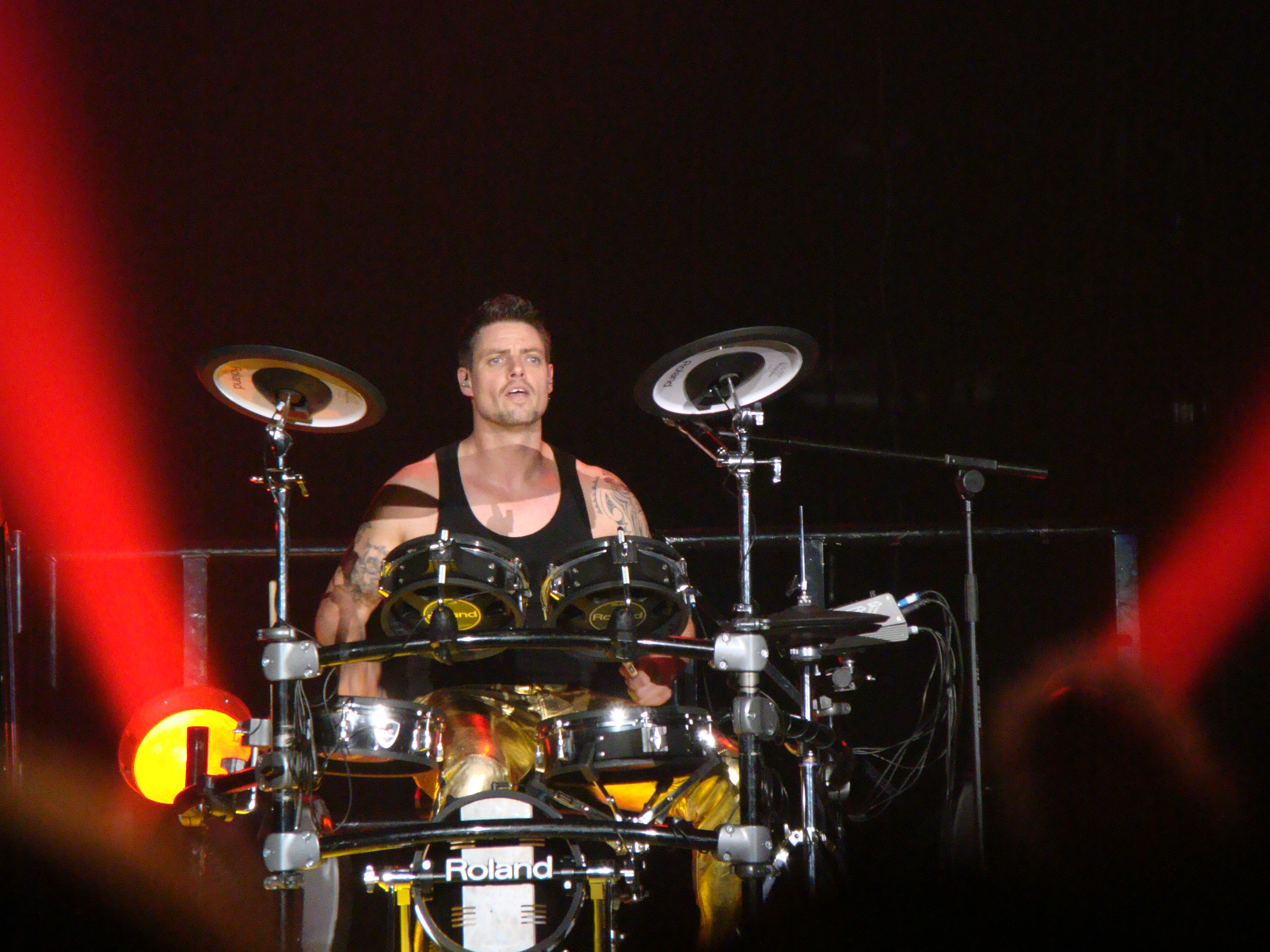
Duffy playing drums, 2009

Duffy first became aware of Boyzone after hearing auditions to become a member were being held. He was unsuccessful in securing an audition, but was later noticed by Louis Walsh (who became the band's manager) whilst dancing in Dublin's POD Nightclub and was invited to audition. Duffy sang Billy Joel's "Piano Man" and danced to Right Said Fred's "I'm Too Sexy". He was chosen as one of the original members of the band. He played a backing role in Boyzone, with Ronan Keating and Stephen Gately handling the majority of lead vocals. In 1994, Duffy and fellow band member Shane Lynch were involved in a nearly fatal car crash; both survived without serious injuries. Boyzone performed together for the last time before their hiatus in Ireland at the Point Theatre during nine dates running from 3–8 January and 10–12 January 2000; they had sold more than 13 million records in total by this time and all sixteen of their singles had reached the top five of the UK Singles Chart. They also became the first Irish act to have four number one hits in the United Kingdom charts.

After Boyzone disbanded in 2000, Duffy teamed up with Shane Lynch and released their pop-rap version of "Girl You Know It's True" under the name Keith 'N' Shane. It was a top 40 hit in the UK, peaking at No. 36 in December 2000. Duffy's profile was raised as a result of his appearance on the first series of the UK's Celebrity Big Brother in 2001, where he finished third out of six, and on Lily Savage's Blankety Blank. In the same year, he appeared on the celebrity special in the fourth season of Fort Boyard alongside Tris Payne, Scott Wright, Sally Gray, and Nell McAndrew. He branched out to acting, most notably on the ITV soap opera Coronation Street as the character Ciaran McCarthy. What was meant to be a three-week stint on the show turned into three years from 2002 to 2005, with Duffy leaving the show to be closer to his family in Ireland.

In May 2008, it was announced that Boyzone would return with their "Back Again... No Matter What" Tour which sold over 200,000 tickets within three hours. The tour began on 25 May 2008 at Belfast's Odyssey arena and finished at Carlisle Bitts Park on 23 August 2008. Duffy went on to play the part of James "Ringo" Leyden in 2008 in the Irish soap opera Fair City, with his character leaving the show in 2009. Boyzone then played their "Better" Tour, which was the last tour to feature member Stephen Gately. Duffy acted as pall-bearer at Gately's funeral on 16 October. Speaking after Gately's death, Duffy reminisced on the early days: "He told Louis [Walsh] he was 5 ft 7 in [1.70 m]. When he auditioned for The Hobbit later on, he said he was 5 ft 3 in [1.60 m]. But he was a true giant of a man".

Duffy became presenter of The Box on Irish television channel TV3, as well as featuring in Irish comedy Mrs Brown. He later served as a judge on the RTÉ talent contest You're a Star, later presenting the fifth series of the show.

Landing his first major feature-film role in 2010, Duffy was cast in Irish horror film Loftus Hall. He reportedly had to bow out of the production due a prior contract stipulation committing him to a 2010 Coronation Street return, which would have interfered with the film's schedule. Subsequently, he returned to the soap in February 2010, reprising his role as lovable Irish rogue Ciaran McCarthy.

On 2 and 3 April 2010, Duffy appeared in ITV's one-off game show The Door. He won the show and his prize was £25,000 for a charity of his choice – Ambitious about Autism (a UK-based charity for autism education, then known as TreeHouse). In June 2010, he continued his work with Autism, launching a mobile phone recycling campaign in Ireland. He also appeared on All Star Family Fortunes on 11 September 2010 again raising money for Ambitious about Autism.

After leaving Coronation Street in January 2011, Duffy returned to Boyzone who reunited and toured the UK and Ireland during February and March 2011, with a 21-date tour of Ireland and UK with their arena-based "Brother" Tour and four outdoor shows around the UK during August. Following the end of the "Brother" Tour, Duffy completed a half Ironman Triathlon raising money for Irish Autism Action. He returned to Coronation Street in September 2011 for a short stint. His last appearance as Ciaran was on 25 November 2011.

From November 2011 to February 2012, Duffy played character Teddy Heelin in John B. Keane's play Big Maggie which visited many theatres in Ireland. Fellow Boyzone member Shane Lynch said in an interview on ITV show Loose Women that Boyzone would be releasing a new album and would be touring in 2013, the 20th anniversary of their formation. In November 2013, he appeared as a drug dealing fitness instructor in two episodes of Irish crime drama Love/Hate.

=== 2016–present: Boyzlife ===
Boyzlife is a duo consisting of Duffy and Brian McFadden, formed in 2016 by the pair who previously appeared as members of '90s and 2000s boybands Boyzone and Westlife, respectively.

In February 2020, during a Boyzlife tour, Duffy and Brian McFadden invited mental health campaigner, John Junior on stage to discuss their mental health experiences and campaign. John and Charlie's Journey, they travel around the United Kingdom to encourage conversations about mental health.

On 19 January 2022, the duo announced the release of their upcoming second studio album, Old School.

In March 2025, they announced a UK tour for spring 2026. On 24 October 2025, they released the single "Lovebirds", which peaked at number 76 on the UK Singles Downloads Chart. In December 2025, they announced a UK tour for autumn 2026.

On 31 December 2025, Duffy performed with Keating on the latter's BBC One New Year's Eve programme, Ronan Keating and Friends: A New Year's Eve Party.

== Personal life ==
Duffy married Lisa Smith on 24 June 1998 in Las Vegas, only proposing two days before. Ronan Keating acted as his best man. Together, Keith and Lisa have two children, Jordan Stephen Scott Duffy (born 22 April 1995) and Mia Duffy (born 11 March 2000). After Mia was diagnosed with moderate autism, Duffy has become active in raising awareness of the condition and in October 2014 received an Honorary Fellowship from the RCSI.

Duffy was also present in Kilcloon, Meath on 2 March 2012 for the official opening of 'Stepping Stones', a specialised school for children with autism stating "All we want to do is give our kids a chance in life".

== Charity work ==
Following his daughter's diagnosis with autism at 22 months old in 2000, he has supported different autism charities and campaigned for better support for autistic children in his native Ireland. He stepped down as patron of “Irish Autism Action” after ten years in 2015, raising over €8,000,000 for the organisation in that time. He subsequently began his own charity, the Keith Duffy Foundation, to support autism charities throughout Ireland.

In 2022 he played in the Celebrity Series of the Legends Tour golf tour at tournaments including the Staysure Senior PGA (2021) and the Celebrity Series Grand Final in Mauritius (2021 season, delayed to 2022), winning the event and £25,000 (€29,500) for the charity ASIAM.ie, which helps provide support for children with autism.

== Filmography ==
=== Film and television ===
Year	Show	Role	Notes
2000	FBi	Himself	Presenter
2001	Celebrity Big Brother	Contestant	Day 1–8
2001	The Bombmaker	DS Power	
2002	Mrs Browns Boys (original series)	Vet	Episode #1.1
2002–2005, 2010–2011	Coronation Street	Ciaran McCarthy	Series regular; 407 episodes. Nominated for British Soap Award 2010 & 2011 Sexiest Male, being voted for as one of the top 4 both times.
2004	Petits Mythes Urbains	Charlie Mason	1 episode: Ruf Mich An
2004	Mrs Brown's Boys (original series)	Mick O'Leary	1 Episode: "Believe it or Not"
2004–2005, 2007	The Clinic	Paul Dunne	Recurring role; 6 episodes
2007	Be More Ethnic	Dave	
2008	The Boyz Are Back In Town	Himself	Documentary
2009	Fair City	Ringo Leyden	Recurring role; 3 episodes
2011	Death in Paradise	Eddie	1 episode
2013	Love/Hate	Fitness instructor	2 episodes
2013	Robocroc	Nigel Evans	
2014	Splash!	Contestant	Heat 2, semi-final 1 and final
2014	Mrs. Brown's Boys D'Movie	Security Guard	Feature film
2014	The Job Lot	Andy Greene	1 episode
2016–2017	Little Roy	Jimmy Jones	Regular role
2017	The Black Prince	Casey	Feature film
2020	Celebrity Murder Mystery	Contestant	2 episodes
2025	Boyzone: No Matter What	Himself	3 episodes
2025	Ronan Keating and Friends: A New Year's Eve Party	Himself/performer	BBC One New Year's Eve special
