= Karaoke World Championships =

International karaoke competition

- History
- Genre: International singing competition
- Country of origin: Finland
- Organisation(s): Oy KWC Organisation Ltd
- Established: 2003
- Reigning champions
- (Chile) Elizabeth Moya (solo) (Ukraine) Tanya Ilios & Polina Topalova (duets)

The Karaoke World Championships are an international karaoke competition, featuring approximately 30 countries worldwide. First established in 2003, the first edition of the championships consisted of seven participating countries.

== Format ==
National trials are conducted every year in most participating countries, with the winners competing in the international finals for the title of Karaoke World Champion. Singers from countries without a Nation Partner may enter through global video heats instead, going to represent countries who would otherwise not have a presence in the Worlds Finals.

From 2003 to 2017, two separate categories for male and female contestants were contested. In 2018, the gendered categories were merged into one solo performer category. In 2016, a duet category was introduced. Extra categories have included KWC Juniors (2017) and Champions Round (2018).

== History ==
Finland was the host country for the international finals from 2003 until 2005. In 2006, the finals were held aboard the M/S Galaxy whilst cruising the Baltic Sea from Helsinki to Estonia return. Thailand was the first country to host the finals outside of Finland in September 2007. In 2008, the event returned to Finland, and was twice consecutively in Lahti Hall.

In December 2005, the top five male and female champions of that year were invited to perform for the Princess of Thailand in Bangkok, Thailand during the "KWC Lights Up the Night" tsunami fundraising concert. The black tie concert was televised throughout Thailand and raised money for the 2004 tsunami victims.

Due to the COVID-19 pandemic, the 2020 championships, set to be held in Toronto, Canada, were held online. In 2025, the championships, which were expected to be held in Bangkok, Thailand, were cancelled due to the passing of Queen Mother Sirikit.

== Statistics ==
The United States holds the record of most first places in the solo category (including male and female) with five, followed by the United Kingdom with four, and Australia, Lebanon, and Panama, all three with three each. In the duets category, no nation has won more than once. The United States also has the most top three placements in the solo category with 16, followed by Finland with 11. In the duets category, Panama has the most top three placements with six, followed by the United States with four.

== Editions ==
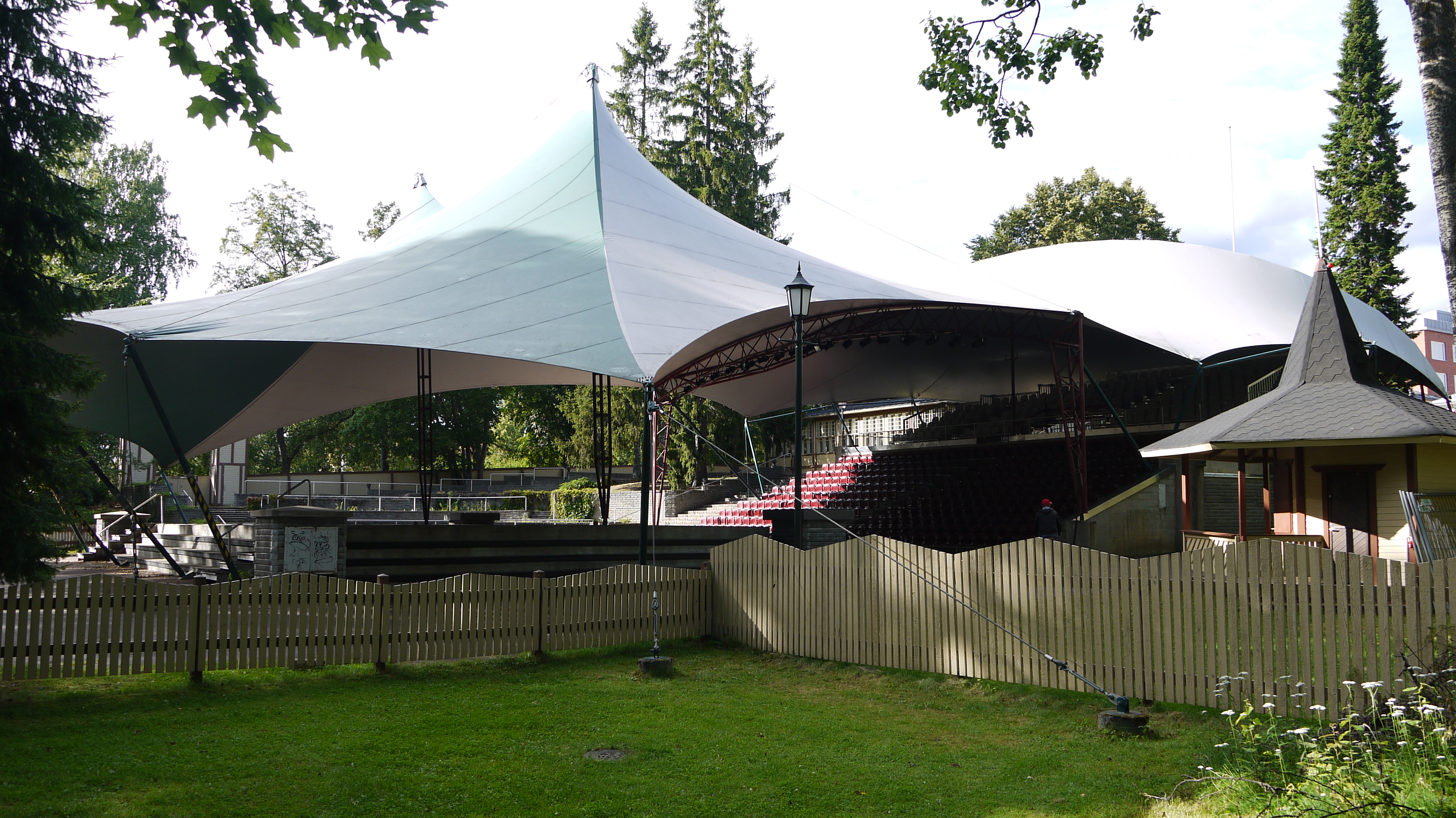
Heinola's Summertheatre held the first three editions of the championships.

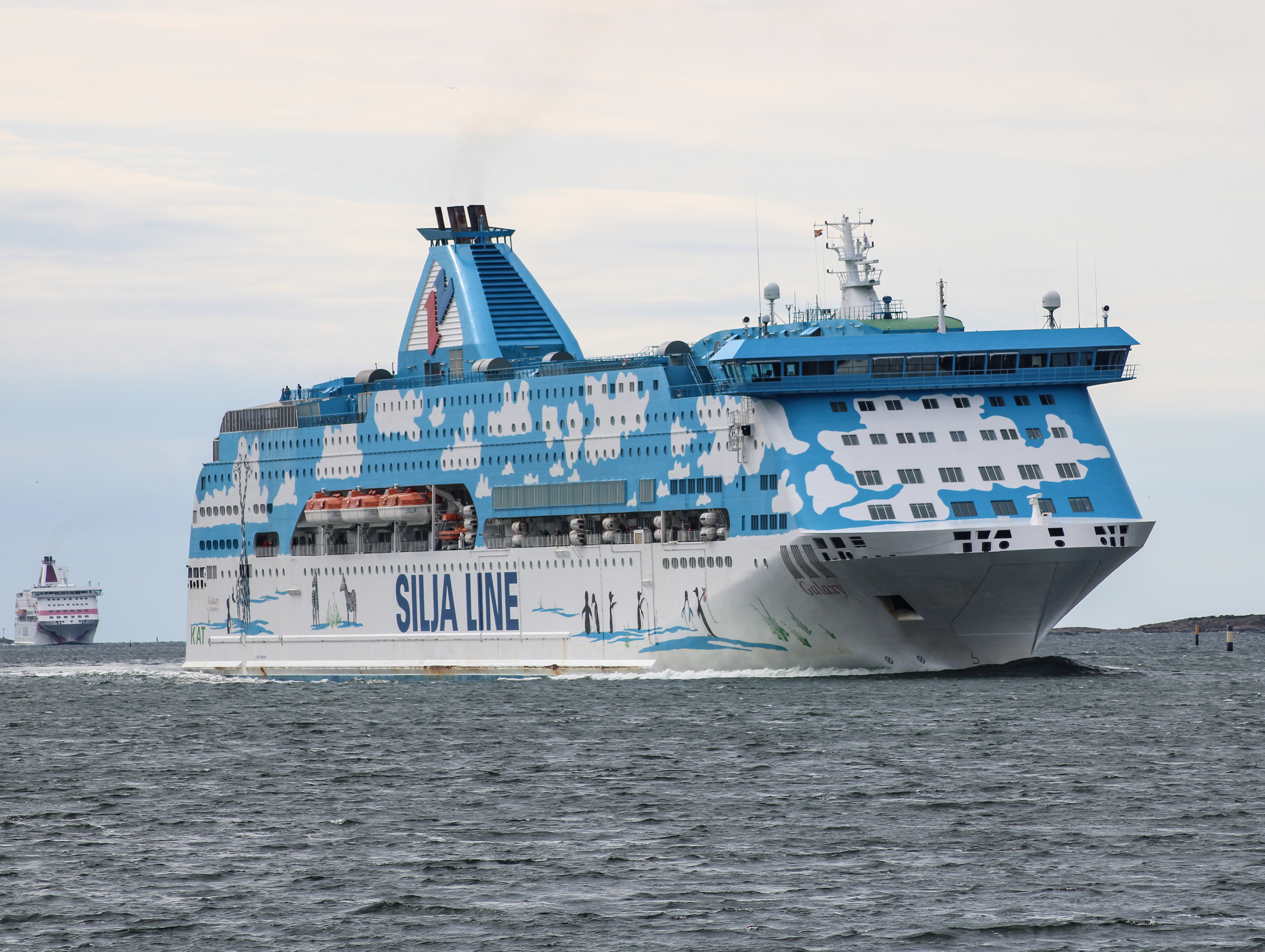
The 2006 championships were held on a M/S Galaxy.

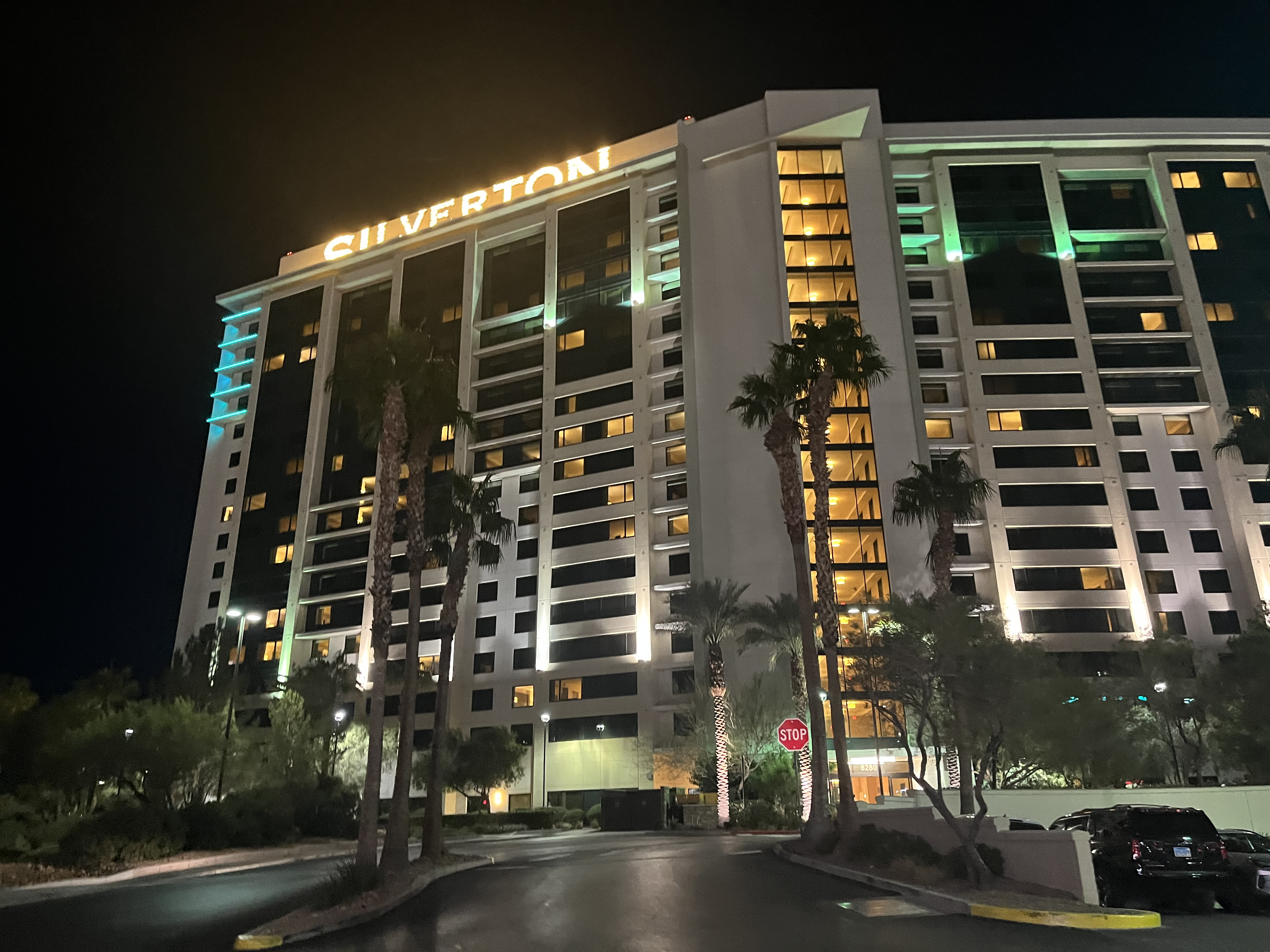
The 2025 championships are expected to be held at Silverton Casino.

| N° | Date | Host city | Venue |
|---|---|---|---|
| 1st | 2003 | Helsinki, Finland | Heinola's Summertheatre |
| 2nd | 2004 | Helsinki, Finland | Heinola's Summertheatre |
| 3rd | 2005 | Helsinki, Finland | Heinola's Summertheatre |
| 4th | 2006 | Helsinki, Finland; Tallinn, Estonia | M/S Galaxy |
| 5th | 2007 | Bangkok, Thailand | Suan Lum Bangkok Night Bazaar |
| 6th | 2008 | Lahti, Finland | Lahti Hall |
| 7th | 2009 | Lahti, Finland | Lahti Hall |
| 8th | 2010 | Moscow, Russia | Forum Center |
| 9th | 2011 | (Republic of Ireland) Killarney, Ireland | Gleneagle Hotel & Conference Centre |
| 10th | 2012 | Lappeenranta, Finland | Holiday Club Saimaa |
| 11th | 2013 | Lappeenranta, Finland | Holiday Club Saimaa |
| 12th | 2014 | Stockholm, Sweden | Solidaritet Arena |
| 13th | 2015 | Singapore | Orchard Plaza |
| 14th | 2016 | Vancouver, Canada | Edgewater Casino |
| 15th | 2017 | Helsinki, Finland | Tapahtumakeskus Telakka |
| 16th | 2018 | Helsinki, Finland | Apollo Live Club |
| 17th | 2019 | Tokyo, Japan | Kanda Myojin Shrine Hall |
| 18th | 2020 | Event held virtually due to COVID-19 pandemic | |
| 19th | 2021 | Event held virtually due to COVID-19 pandemic | |
| 20th | 2022 | Årnes, Norway | Nes Kulturhus |
| 21st | November 6–11, 2023 | Panama City, Panama | Hotel El Panamá |
| 22nd | October 7–12, 2024 | Turku, Finland | Logomo |
| 23rd | 2025 | Event cancelled due to Queen Mother Sirikit's passing | |
| 24th | October 25–29, 2026 | Las Vegas, United States | Silverton Casino |

== Winners ==
=== Male category (2003–2017) ===
| Year | First place | Second place | Third place |
|---|---|---|---|
| 2003 | (England) Uche Eke | (Finland) Olli-Pekka Junttila | (Finland) Jan-Mikael Pennanen |
| 2004 | (Austria) Thomas Strübler | (Finland) Robin Berg | (United States) Bret Harmon |
| 2005 | (Lebanon) Iyad Sfeir | (Republic of Ireland) Danny Cummins | (Finland) Ari Koivunen |
| 2006 | (Australia) Mark Wilson | (South Africa) David September | (Malaysia) Badri Ibrahim |
| 2007 | (Malaysia) Lu Hee Wah | (United States) Michael Moses Griffin | (Republic of Ireland) David Naughton |
| 2008 | (Australia) Michael Bates | (United Kingdom) Anthony Garcia | (Sweden) Medhanie Mezgebe |
| 2009 | (Republic of Ireland) Adrian Kenny | (Finland) Sami Muhonen | (Lebanon) Elie-Georges Hatem |
| 2010 | (Finland) Sam Moudden | (Russia) Fedor Rytikov | (Austria) Georg Duschlbauer |
| 2011 | (Lebanon) Marc Hatem | (Philippines) Joel Cruz | (Russia) Vladimir Pak |
| 2012 | (Panama) Luis Boutin | (Finland) Ville Pyykönen | (United States) Cornelius Andrews |
| 2013 | (Japan) Teruhisa Tanaka | (New Zealand) Michael Asovale | (Russia) Roman Leyba |
| 2014 | (United States) Anthony Montius Magee | (Canada) Mitchell Freeman | (Singapore) Kamsani "Sunny Jackson" Jumahat |
| 2015 | (Singapore) Muhammad Fairus bin Adam | (United States) Jeff Edwards | (Canada) Michael Victorero |
| 2016 | (Japan) Ryota Kaizo | (United States) Gabriel Much | (Germany) Marc Motzer |
| 2017 | (Angola) Pedro Matias | (France) Didier Coste | (United States) Andy Navarrete |

=== Female category (2003–2017) ===
| Year | First place | Second place | Third place |
|---|---|---|---|
| 2003 | (England) Danni Cadby | (Finland) Säde Hovisilta | (Norway) Christine Aas-Hals |
| 2004 | (Lebanon) Samantha Sayegh | (Iceland) Shirley Lowther | (Norway) Cathrine Hovland |
| 2005 | (Republic of Ireland) Rachel Browne | (Thailand) Saisunee Sukhakrit | (Portugal) Isabel Viana |
| 2006 | (Malaysia) Tham Hui Chyi | (China) Yao Dan | (Russia) Veronica Konnova |
| 2007 | (Australia) Julie Walter-Sgro | (Republic of Ireland) Vanessa Cooney | (Hungary) Gabriella Lukács |
| 2008 | (France) Julie Gonnet | (Republic of Ireland) Elaine O’Halloran | (Sweden) Jasmine Kara |
| 2009 | (Russia) Nataliya Pilyutina | (Australia) Dina David | (Finland) Jenni Roth |
| 2010 | (Finland) Maria Saarimaa-Ylitalo | (Russia) Julia Kurileva | (United States) Tami Marie |
| 2011 | (United States) Cassandra Jopp | (Spain) Estefania Gralla | (Canada) Jerrica Santos |
| 2012 | (Spain) Raquel Pando | (Australia) Candice Skjonnemand | (Philippines) Lilibeth Garcia |
| 2013 | (Spain) Sarah Ramos | (Finland) Jenni Ylätalo | (United States) Kimberly Evans |
| 2014 | (Panama) Diana Villamonte | (United States) Miriam Kim | (Indonesia) Monika Nike Adiba |
| 2015 | (Canada) Elsaida Alerta | (Faroe Islands) Paula Danielsen | (Spain) Charo Gimenez Bravo |
| 2016 | (Panama) Astrid Nicole | (United States) Laura Moreau | (Brazil) Bruna Higashi |
| 2017 | (United States) Chyeé Howell | (Panama) Emely Myles | (Ukraine) Margarita Dvoynenko |

=== Duets category (2016–present) ===
| Year | First place | Second place | Third place |
|---|---|---|---|
| 2016 | (United States) Konomi Rivers & Lance Moore | (Panama) Astrid Nicole & Hiram Harris | (Canada) Roger Feng & Heidi Joshua |
| 2017 | (Japan) Ryota Kaizo & Rena Saito | (United States) Mikko Blaze Bordeaux & Beth Brennan | (Panama) Emely Miles & Ricardo Canto |
| 2018 | (Finland) Tea Repo & Jyri Paavilainen | (Panama) Karol Wilson & Eliezer Berroa | (United States) Mel Arizpe & Laura Carrizales |
| 2019 | (Canada) Candace Miles & Kate Dion | (Brazil) Aline Cunha & Rairo | (United States) Valerisse Bell & Ishma Cortez Clark |
| 2022 | (Panama) Emely Myles & Eliezer Berroa | (Canada) John Wiest & Mike Smoroden | (Finland) Moose Hurskainen & Sari Maria Kankkonen |
| 2023 | (Mexico) Luis Villanueva & Diego Mendoza Martínez | (Panama) Abdiel Josué & Ericka Rodríguez | (Brazil) Filipe Anacleto & Sara Braz |
| 2024 | (Ukraine) Tanya Ilios & Polina Topalova | (Panama) Annabella Iriza & Angel Gabriel Credidio | (Brazil) Rhamon & Yasmine Mahfuz |

=== Solo category (2018–present) ===
| Year | First place | Second place | Third place |
|---|---|---|---|
| 2018 | (United States) Mikko Blaze Bordeaux | (Panama) Karol Wilson | (United Kingdom) Lascel Wood |
| 2019 | (United Kingdom) Jenny Ball | (Canada) Katey Day-Reick | (Indonesia) Olivia Ruth |
| 2020 | (United States) Garvaundo Hamilon | (Brazil) Max Moraes | (Spain) José de la Vega |
| 2021 | (Indonesia) Shabrina Leonita | (Estonia) Viktoria Seimar | (Brazil) Talita Martins |
| 2022 | (Indonesia) Keke Adiba | (United States) Sia Chandler | (Mexico) Brenda Gaviño |
| 2023 | (United Kingdom) Ellie Butler | (Philippines) Rafaella Joy Berso | (Kazakhstan) Zarina Kulmukhambetova |
| 2024 | (Chile) Elizabeth Moya | (Spain) Ian García | (Panama) Annabella Iriza |

== Participating Countries ==
- Australia
- Angola
- Azerbaijan
- Belarus
- Brazil
- Bulgaria
- Canada
- Chile
- Colombia
- Costa Rica
- Estonia
- Faroe Islands
- Finland
- France
- Germany
- India
- Indonesia
- Ireland
- Italy
- Japan
- Jordan
- Latvia
- Kenya
- Kuwait
- Lebanon
- Malaysia
- Mexico
- Morocco
- Moldova
- Myanmar
- New Zealand
- Norway
- Panama
- Philippines
- Poland
- Portugal
- Romania
- Russia
- Singapore
- South Africa
- Sweden
- Thailand
- Ukraine
- United Kingdom
- United States of America
- Vietnam

== Editions ==
=== 2023 Championships ===
Winner

Results of the Solo Singers - Karaoke World Championships 2023
| R/O | Country | Artist | Round 1+2 | Round 3 | Round 4 | Place |
|---|---|---|---|---|---|---|
| 1 | France | Oscar Hanrath Garcia | 127 | | | 33. |
| 2 | Kazakhstan | Alisher | 147 | 72 | | 22. |
| 3 | Panama | Anabella Iriza | 147 | 85 | 132 | 8. |
| 4 | Finland | Saana-Eveliina Mannerlaakso | 138 | | | 28. |
| 5 | Denmark | Jan Flemming Christensen | 128 | | | 32. |
| 6 | Brazil | Filipe Anacleto | 160 | 84 | | 14. |
| 7 | Germany | Kristian Nikou | 120 | | | 37. |
| 8 | Panama | Paula De Macedo | 136 | 77 | | 21. |
| 9 | Colombia | Isabel Cristina Contreras Tordecilla | 130 | | | 31. |
| 10 | Ukraine | Polina Topalova | 148 | 78 | | 19. |
| 11 | Australia | Harlem Calleja | 133 | | | 30. |
| 12 | USA | Talon Lewis | 164 | 89 | 120 | 10. |
| 13 | Philippines | Marian Gel Pesigan | 167 | 81 | | 16. |
| 14 | Ireland | Steven Kelly | 112 | | | 40. |
| 15 | Costa Rica | Audiel Moises Cerdas Cordero | 144 | 82 | | 15. |
| 16 | Canada | Renee Thompson | 150 | 86 | 128 | 9. |
| 17 | Nigeria | Preye Stephanie Emberru | | | | DNP |
| 18 | Sweden | Carl Hanzie Hansson | 117 | | | 38. |
| 19 | Faroe Islands | Eva Hjelm Aanesen | 121 | | | 36. |
| 20 | Norway | Natalia Marín | 141 | | | 25. |
| 21 | Mexico | Luis Villanueva | 158 | 88 | 134 | 5. |
| 22 | United Kingdom | Ellie Butler | 169 | 90 | 146 | 1. |
| 23 | Panama | Anabell Del Carmen Avila Medina | 161 | 85 | | 11. |
| 24 | Sweden | Monica Lofgren | 124 | | | 34. |
| 25 | Colombia | Christian Tapia | 140 | | | 26. |
| 26 | Denmark | Linda Maria Csösz-Erdei | 142 | | | 23. |
| 27 | Panama | Yassuri Martínez | 173 | 81 | | 16. |
| 28 | Norway | Kjetil André Johannessen | 154 | 85 | | 11. |
| 29 | Philippines | Rafaella Joy Berso | 172 | 85 | 150 | 2. |
| 30 | USA | Mico Mauleon | 163 | 88 | 130 | 7. |
| 31 | Canada | Susan Attard | 149 | 86 | 136 | 5. |
| 32 | Faroe Islands | Edvin H. Niclasen | 136 | | | 29. |
| 33 | Kazakhstan | Zarina | 147 | 93 | 136 | 3. |
| 34 | Kenya | Godfrey Kanyua | | | | DNP |
| 35 | France | Maëva Bocque | 139 | | | 27. |
| 36 | Iceland | Hannes Þórður Hafstein Þorvaldsson | 124 | | | 35. |
| 37 | Finland | Hanna Kanasuo | 142 | 78 | | 20. |
| 38 | Costa Rica | Denia Mairena Ponces | 117 | | | 38. |
| 39 | Mexico | Diego Mendoza Martínez | 173 | 88 | 136 | 4. |
| 40 | Chile | Jairo Quezada | 148 | 80 | | 18. |
| 41 | Belgium | Felipe De Souza Ferraz | 142 | | | 24. |
| 42 | Brazil | Sara Braz | 155 | 85 | | 11. |
| 43 | Nigeria | Kessy Doris Mbonu | | | | DNP |
