= Maeve O'Donovan =

- Birth name: Maeve O'Donovan
- Born: 1990
- Origin: Ardnacrusha, County Clare, Ireland
- Instrument(s): vocals, guitar, piano
- Years active: 2005–2006

Maeve Ellen O'Donovan, known professionally as Maeve Ellen, is a singer-songwriter from Limerick, Ireland. She was a finalist in the 2006/2007 final on the RTÉ programme You're a Star. She made it to the semi-final. In the final week of the competition, her track, "Landslide", made it into the Irish music charts.

The Irish Rugby Team (coached by her father Niall O'Donovan) pledged their support for her to win the "You're A Star" competition in which she came in third.

In 2014 she opened a coffeehouse in Limerick, Ireland, called 'Cellar Door'.
