= You're a Star =

- Presented by: Ray D'Arcy (2003–05); Síle Seoige (2003–08); Derek Mooney (2005–06); Keith Duffy (2007); Brian Ormond (2008) (See dates and series)
- Judges: Kerry Katona; Darren Smith; Phil Coulter; Linda Martin; Louis Walsh; Barbara Galvin; Dave Fanning; Hazel Kaneswaran; Thomas Black; Brendan O'Connor; Michelle Heaton; Keith Duffy (see dates and series)
- Country of origin: Republic of Ireland
- Original language: English
- No. of series: 6

Production
- Executive producer: Larry Bass
- Running time: Varies

Original release
- Network: RTÉ One
- Release: 3 November 2002 – 16 March 2008

You're a Star is an Irish music competition series broadcast by RTÉ One from 2002 to 2008. Produced by the broadcaster and Screentime ShinAwiL, the series was similar to formats such as Idol and The X Factor.

For its first three series, You're a Star was used to choose the musician who would perform the Irish entry at the Eurovision Song Contest. In later series, the grand prize was changed to a recording contract with Universal Music Ireland (with the Irish selection now conducted via the Eurosong qualifier, whose finals are hosted by The Late Late Show), and later music equipment and €50,000. The series was broadcast live from The Helix theatre in Dublin City University (DCU).

The show was cancelled after the 2008 series and replaced a year later with The All Ireland Talent Show.

== Presenters and judges ==
=== Presenters ===
Key
Original presenter(s)
Previous presenter(s)

Presenter	Series 1	Series 2	Series 3	Series 4	Series 5	Series 6
Ray D'Arcy						
Sile Seoige						
Derek Mooney						
Keith Duffy						
Brian Ormond						

=== Judging panel ===
Key
Original judge(s)
Previous judge(s)
Guest judge(s)

Judge	Series 1	Series 2	Series 3	Series 4	Series 5	Series 6
Kerry Katona						
Darren Smith						
Phil Coulter						
Linda Martin						
Louis Walsh						
Barbara Galvin						
Dave Fanning						
Hazel Kaneswaran						
Thomas Black						
Brendan O'Connor						
Michelle Heaton						
Keith Duffy						

- In series one (2002–03), Linda Martin stood in for Kerry Katona midway through the series.
- In series two (2003–04), Linda Martin replaced Kerry Katona and Louis Walsh (judge on UK The X Factor) replaced Darren Smith.
- In series three (2004–05), owing to the poor result at the Eurovision Song Contest 2004 there was a public outcry and all judges were replaced by Dave Fanning (DJ RTÉ 2fm), Hazel Kaneswaran (famed from UK Popstars: The Rivals in 2002), and Barbara Galvin.
- In series four (2005–06), owing to the popularity of judges on Charity You're a Star in 2005, Linda Martin was brought back and Brendan O'Connor and Thomas Black (from record label Much Music) were introduced.
- In series six (2007–08), Michelle Heaton (Liberty X) replaced Linda Martin, and Keith Duffy (Boyzone) replaced Thomas Black.

== 2002–03: Series 1 ==
The inaugural contest took place from 2002–03. Raidió Teilifís Éireann, being the Irish member of the European Broadcasting Union, decided that the winner of You're a Star would be sent to represent Ireland in the Eurovision Song Contest for the foreseeable proceeding years. The show was hosted by Ray D'Arcy. The Talent spotter, Phil Coulter and Kerry Katona served as judges. In the final, the public voted for their winner: Mickey Joe Harte, a musician and singer-songwriter from Lifford in County Donegal. He entered Eurovision Song Contest 2003 with the song "We've Got the World", finishing in eleventh position. At the time this was considered one of the poorest results achieved by Ireland, who are the Eurovision Song Contest's most successful country with seven wins. "We've Got the World" reached number one on the Irish Singles Chart, where it remained for five weeks and went on to become the best-selling single of 2003. However, Mickey Harte's most recent album only peaked at number 53.

== 2003–04: Series 2 ==
You're a Star returned for a 2003/2004 season. Ray D'arcy returned for his second season as host. The judges of the show differed from season one. Chris Doran from Waterford won the competition. In the final of Eurovision Song Contest 2004 Chris Doran finished in 22nd position with seven points awarded by the United Kingdom. Onstage monitoring for the artist on the night, combined with a lack of experience may have caused tuning issues, which were not manifest during the auditions. As a result, Ireland did not qualify automatically for the 2005 Eurovision final. The song "If My World Stopped Turning" reached number 1 in the Irish Singles Chart, but Doran was, however, unable to sustain a successful music career in Ireland. His most recent song failed to crack the top twenty.

Position	Song	Singer	Place
1	"Losing You"	James Kilbane	2nd
2	"Summer Rain"	Jean Elliot	3rd
3	"If My World Stopped Turning"	Chris Doran	1st

== 2004–05: Series 3 ==
The format of the show was changed for the 2004/2005 season, to try to ensure that Ireland chose an act with more appeal across Europe. The show was no longer limited to solo singer-performers; bands under the size of six people could now enter. The final was held on 6 March 2005. Donna and Joseph McCaul, a brother-and-sister act from Westmeath won the contest. The Jades, a band from Wexford, finished in second position. The Henry Girls from Donegal finished in third position. Bringing up the rear of The Henry Girls, Ian Barrett, a (then 16-year-old) soloist from Wicklow finished fourth, with a version of "We Didn't Start the Fire".

In the semi-final of Eurovision Song Contest 2005, Donna and Joe sang "Love?" (pronounced "love question mark"), written by Karl Broderick. The act failed to qualify for the final. They also suffered the embarrassment of becoming the first You're a Star winner not to reach the number 1 position in Ireland, beaten by Akon with his song "Lonely". Their last song, released in June 2006, peaked at number 10. They later appeared on The Podge and Rodge Show, only for the hosts to poke fun at their attempt in the Eurovision. A clip was shown of them performing, when Rodge afterwards asked, "I wonder why they didn't win?!", and subsequently laughed hysterically. The McCauls sporadically resurface now and again, such as in 2008 when they appeared on RTÉ television show Fáilte Towers. After this series, Ray D'Arcy stepped down as the host of the competition.

No.	Song	Singer	Place
1	"Will I Be Dreaming"	The Henry Girls	3rd
2	"Love?"	Donna and Joseph McCaul	1st
3	"Pink Champagne"	Jade	2nd

== 2005–06: Series 4 ==
On 16 September 2005, RTÉ confirmed that the show would return for a fourth series. However, unlike the previous three seasons, the 2005/06 prize was not the opportunity to represent Ireland in the Eurovision Song Contest. Instead, it was a recording contract with the record labels Universal Music Ireland and Polydor UK (international distribution) and €10,000 worth of musical/audio equipment from Roland Ireland. The live shows began on 1 January when the final contestants were chosen. These included Marilyn Bane who came third, The Sullivan Brothers who came second and Lucia Evans from Galway who won the competition and the recording contract. Her first and last song "Bruised but not broken" only peaked at number 5 in the Irish Singles Chart, making her the first You're a Star winner not to reach the top three. The song lasted three weeks in the top ten before a rapid fall from the top fifty.

=== Presenters ===
This year Síle Seoige and Derek Mooney hosted the season. Síle covered the auditions. She chatted with the acts before they performed in front of judges, congratulated those who progressed to the next round or, sometimes, offered a shoulder to cry on for those did not. Derek hosted the live shows. He introduced the acts to the audience and then, after the performance, asked the judges for their insight. Sometimes he played the part of referee when there was a conflict of opinion between the judges.

=== Judges ===
Linda Martin and Brendan O'Connor who voiced their professional opinion and advice during the Charity Special returned for this season along with Thomas Black of the record label EMI Records.

On 26 February, the judges announced their favourite contestants. Brendan's was Lucia Evens. Linda's two were Lucia and the Sullivan Brothers. Finally, Thomas said that both Marilyn Bane and Lucia Evans were the strongest of the semi-finalists.

=== Stages ===
18 acts were picked from the auditions. Nine acts went directly through to the first stage. The other nine went to the Wildcard show where an additional three acts were chosen to go the first stage.

Directly Through	Wildcards	Contestants
Tammy Brown		ç (eliminated 8 January 2006)
	Sinead McGovern	Sinead McGovern (eliminated 15 January 2006)
Ruairi Quinn	Tara Sinnot (eliminated 1 January 2006)	Ruairi Quinn (eliminated 22 January 2006)
The Ups		The Ups (eliminated 22 January 2006)
Leman	Elain & Alan (eliminated 1 January 2006)	Leman (eliminated 29 January 2006)
Nickel & Dime	Xerosun (eliminated 1 January 2006)	Nickel & Dime (eliminated 5 February 2006)
Ciara McGinn	Aibhe Du Vé (eliminated 1 January 2006)	Ciara McGinn (eliminated 12 February 2006)
Louise Killeen	Aoife Downey (eliminated 1 January 2006)	Louise Killeen (eliminated 19 February 2006)
	Jeannete Cronin	Jeannete Cronin (eliminated 26 February 2006)
	Marilyn Bane	Marilyn Bane (eliminated 4 March 2006)
Sullivan Brothers		Sullivan Brothers (eliminated 5 March 2006)
Lucia Evans		Lucia Evans (Winner)

== 2006–07: Series 5 ==
On 19 August 2006, RTÉ confirmed that You're a Star would return for a fifth series. The tour venues were The Hill Grove Hotel in Monaghan, The Helix and the RDS in Dublin, The Mill Street Arena in Cork and The Lodge Hotel Conference Centre in Galway. Brian Ormond hosted the audition phase and Keith Duffy hosted the live shows. Unlike in earlier series, there was no wild card show. Out of 7,000 auditionees, only 82 made it through to the workshop round. Out of these, 40 went through to the knock-out round until the final 12 were chosen. Shockingly, early favourite the very talented and charismatic Paul James, was eliminated in week 1. Much public outrage followed.

The finalists were:

- Alan Kavanagh
- Andrew Bennett
- Brian Clarke
- David O'Connor
- 21 Demands (now known as Kodaline)
- Scuba Dice
- Ian White
- Andrew Grafton
- Maeve O'Donovan
- Richie McCoy
- Shane Downey
- Susan O'Neill

The prize that year was a recording contract with Universal Music, a publishing contract with Sony ATV Publishing, €10,000 worth of musical equipment from Roland Ireland and a cash price. Linda Martin, Brendan O'Connor and Thomas Black returned as the judges. Every week a guest act would appear on the series. These included Tony Hatch (who tutored the acts on one of the weeks), Sophie Ellis Bextor, The Blizzards, Shayne Ward and McFly among others. Brian McFadden appeared one week as a guest judge.

On Sunday 3 March 2007, David O'Connor, 21 Demands, Maeve O'Donovan and Scuba Dice released their own singles through digital7 downloads on the RTÉ website. They all made it into the top 20 in the Irish charts with 21 Demands coming in at number 1 on the chart followed by David O'Connor. The songs released were "Give Me a Minute" (by 21 Demands), "The Winner Takes It All" (by David O'Connor), "Landslide" (by Maeve O'Donovan), "Holiday" (by Scuba Dice). 21 Demands became the first act in Irish chart history to score a number 1 single on downloads alone.

The week prior to the finale a huge advertising campaign was launched with TV ads, a poster campaign on billboards and buses and a radio campaign. The finale was held over two nights on Saturday-Sunday 16–17 March 2007. Shayne Ward and Louis Walsh were there to announce the winner. Louis Walsh said that 21 Demands had a great future with the right management. Brendan O'Connor said it would be a crime if 21 Demands did not win. Linda and Thomas agreed. Despite the comments, former jockey David O'Connor was crowned the winner. The finale pulled an average viewer ship rating of over 500,000, down almost 20% on the previous year.

== 2007–08: Series 6 ==
On 23 November 2007, You're a Star returned for a sixth series. This was also the last series. That year the prize was €10,000 worth of music equipment plus €50,000 in cash. The final 15 were announced on 13 January 2008. The contestants were:

- Black Daisy
- Catherine Harding
- Conan Lyndsay
- Deirdre Archbold
- Fauve Chapman
- Leann Constant
- Leanne Moore
- Mairead O'Dowd
- Mike McNamara
- Pat Fitzgibbon
- Peter Karpenia
- Robyn Kavanagh
- Rosie Howic
- Sacha Murphy
- Sharon Condon

On 20 January 2008, eight of the finalists sang live in a smaller hall in the Helix. They were Leanne Constant, Pat Fitzgibbon, Mairead O'Dowd, Robyn Kavanagh, Mike McNamara, Catherine Harding, Rosie Howick and Fauve Chapman. Out of these performers, two would be eliminated from the competition. The one with the lowest votes would be kicked out straight away, while the next lowest two would have to perform in a sing off, with the judges having the deciding vote. On 9 March 2008, four contestants remained, including – Deirdre Archbold, Sharon Condon, Robyn Kavanagh and Leanne Moore. Leanne Moore was the eventual winner of the sixth series, beating Robyn Kavanagh (who came second) and Deirdre Archbold in the final on 16 March 2008.

== Charity You're a Star ==
In the Summer of 2005, eight Irish celebrities enrolled in a You're a Star Style competition. However, their objective was not to become an international singing sensations, but to raise money for a charity of their choice.

== Results summary ==
Series	Year	Winner	Runner-up	Third place	Main judges	Main host	Charity Winner
One	2002–03	Mickey Joe Harte	Simon Casey	Michael Leonard	Darren Smith; Phil Coulter; Kerry McFadden/Linda Martin	Ray D'Arcy	—N/a
Two	2003–04	Chris Doran	James Kilbane	Jean Elliot	Linda Martin; Phil Coulter; Louis Walsh	Ray D'Arcy	—N/a
Three	2004–05	Donna and Joseph McCaul	Jade	The Henry Girls	Barbara Galvin; Dave Fanning; Hazel Kaneswaran	Ray D'Arcy	David Mitchell
Four	2005–06	Lucia Evans	The Sullivan Brothers	Marilyn Bane	Linda Martin; Brendan O'Connor; Thomas Black	Derek Mooney	John Aldridge
Five	2006–07	David O'Connor	21 Demands (Now known as Kodaline)	Maeve O'Donovan	Linda Martin; Brendan O'Connor; Thomas Black	Keith Duffy	The All-Stars: David Beggy, Barney Rock, Jack O'Shea
Six	2007–08	Leanne Moore	Robyn Kavanagh	Deirdre Archbold	Brendan O'Connor; Michelle Heaton; Keith Duffy	Brian Ormond	—N/a

== See also ==
- Ireland in the Eurovision Song Contest
- The All Ireland Talent Show
- Popstars
- Fame: The Musical
