= 2004 in Ireland =

- Centuries: 19th; 20th; 21st
- Decades: 1980s; 1990s; 2000s; 2010s; 2020s
- See also: 2004 in Northern Ireland; Other events of 2004; List of years in Ireland

Events from the year 2004 in Ireland.

== Incumbents ==
- President: Mary McAleese
- Taoiseach: Bertie Ahern (FF)
- Tánaiste: Mary Harney (PD)
- Minister for Finance:
  - Charlie McCreevy (FF) (until 29 September 2004)
  - Brian Cowen (FF) (from 29 September 2004)
- Chief Justice:
  - Ronan Keane (until 2004)
  - John L. Murray (from 23 July 2004)
- Dáil: 29th
- Seanad: 22nd

== Events ==
=== January ===
- 1 January –
  - Ireland assumed the rotating position of the Presidency of the Council of the European Union for six months.
  - Taoiseach Bertie Ahern assumed the rotating position of the President of the European Council for six months.
  - Scouting Ireland was created when the merger between Scouting Ireland (CSI) and the Scout Association of Ireland (SAI) became effective.

=== February ===
- 28 February – Five people were killed in a bus crash at Wellington Quay, Dublin.

=== March ===
- 16 March – The cooling towers of Rhode Power Station, near Kilbeggan, County Westmeath, were demolished.
- 27 March – Ireland's rugby team won the Triple Crown for the first time since 1985.
- 29 March – A smoking ban introduced by Minister for Health, Micheál Martin, came into effect in all pubs, restaurants, and work places.

=== April ===
- 20 April – Welsh pub landlords reported an increase in the number of Irish patrons visiting Wales where they could avoid the restrictions of Ireland's new smoking ban which prohibited smoking in Irish pubs. The drinkers could travel to Wales by ferryboat for as little as £10 for a day-return ticket, smoke cigarettes while drinking, and pay lower prices for their alcohol.

=== May ===
- 1–25 May – Heads of government celebrated in Dublin as the European Union admitted ten new member states.
- 18 May – Clare O'Leary became the first Irish woman to reach the summit of Mount Everest.

=== June ===
- 11 June
  - European Parliament Election 2004 – Fine Gael emerged as the largest party, eclipsing Fianna Fáil by one seat. Two Independent MEPs were elected. The Labour Party won one seat and Sinn Féin took a seat for the first time ever.
  - Local Elections, 2004 – Fianna Fáil's share of the vote fell sharply while all the other opposition parties made gains. Sinn Féin made a big breakthrough with a record number of councillors being elected.
- 16 June – The Grangegorman Development Bill was published by the Irish Government.
- 25 June – US President George W. Bush arrived at Shannon Airport for a European Union–United States summit.
- 30 June
  - President of France Jacques Chirac congratulated Ireland on its presidency of the European Commission, saying that it was the "best presidency ever."
  - Operations commenced on the Luas tram's Green Line in Dublin.
- Undated – The first phase of Ireland's first offshore wind farm, the Arklow Bank Wind Park, was commissioned.

=== July ===
- 20 July – Minister for Finance, Charlie McCreevy, was appointed as Ireland's next European Commissioner.

=== August ===
- 7 August – Athlete Cathal Lombard was accused of taking performance-enhancing drugs at the Olympic Games.
- 13 August – Minister for Agriculture, Joe Walsh, announced his retirement from the Cabinet after seven years. He was the longest-serving agriculture minister in Europe.
- 27 August – Cian O'Connor won a gold medal for Ireland at the Olympic Games in Athens.

=== September ===
- 8 September – Former Taoiseach John Bruton was appointed EU Ambassador to the United States.
- 14 September – Mary McAleese announced her intention to run for a second term as President of Ireland.
- 29 September – Bertie Ahern reshuffled his cabinet. Michael Smith, Joe Walsh and Charlie McCreevy retired from the government. Brian Cowen became Minister for Finance and Dermot Ahern became Minister for Foreign Affairs. Mary Hanafin, Dick Roche, and Willie O'Dea joined the Cabinet table for the first time. Séamus Brennan was assigned to the position of Minister for Social and Family Affairs. Mary Coughlan becomes Ireland's first female Minister for Agriculture and Food.
- 30 September
  - Leader of the Democratic Unionist Party (DUP), Ian Paisley, made a historic first visit to Dublin for political talks with Taoiseach Bertie Ahern.
  - The Luas tram's Red Line commenced operation from Tallaght to Connolly Station.

=== October ===
- 1 October – As nominations for presidential candidates closed, Mary McAleese was re-elected unopposed for a second term as President of Ireland.
- 2 October – Ireland's second national television channel, N2, reverted to its original name of RTÉ Two.
- 5 October – The Government issued an Irish passport to British hostage Ken Bigley in an effort to secure his release from his Iraqi captors.
- 16 October – Bertie Ahern held discussions with United Nations Secretary-General Kofi Annan in Dublin.
- 19 October – Dublin-born aid worker Margaret Hassan was kidnapped in Iraq.

=== November ===
- 1 November – The International Equestrian Federation confirmed that part of a B sample of "Waterford Crystal," the horse ridden by Olympic showjumping gold medallist Cian O'Connor, had been stolen in England.
- 3 November – Fran Rooney resigned as chief executive of the Football Association of Ireland.
- 9 November – Banned substances were confirmed in the B blood sample of the horse, "Waterford Crystal."
- 15 November – Minister for Community, Rural and Gaeltacht Affairs, Éamon Ó Cuív, escaped injury when his ministerial car was involved in a head-on collision with another car in County Kerry.
- 16 November – Margaret Hassan was murdered by her captors in Iraq.
- 22 November – Bertie Ahern celebrated ten years as leader of the Fianna Fáil party.

=== December ===
- 15 December – The Irish Nationality and Citizenship Act 2004 was enacted. Inter alia, this provided that children born of most foreign national parents on the island of Ireland were no longer automatically entitled to Irish citizenship.
- 16 December – In Colombia, the Penal Chamber of Bogotá's Supreme Tribunal handed down lengthy jail sentences to the Irish Colombia Three for training Colombian Marxist rebels.
- 18 December – The "Colombia Three", Niall Connolly, Martin McCauley and James Monaghan, jumped bail.
- 19 December – President McAleese convened a meeting of the Council of State to discuss the Health Amendment II Bill, which was presented the previous week by the Health Minister Mary Harney.
- 26 December – Four Irish people were among the victims of the Indian Ocean tsunami.
- 31 December – Taoiseach Bertie Ahern pledged €10 million in humanitarian aid to people affected by the earthquake and tsunami in South and Southeast Asia.
- The Italian Quarter private development opened in Dublin, incorporating the photographic mural Dublin's Last Supper.
- A hoax commemorative plaque remembering Fr. Pat Noise was installed on O'Connell Bridge, Dublin

== Arts and literature ==
- 4 March – Dublin: Foundation, an historical novel by Edward Rutherfurd, was published.
- 27 August – The film Adam & Paul was released.
- 29 September – Totally Dublin magazine starts publication
- 14 October – The Lewis Glucksman Gallery at University College Cork, designed by O'Donnell & Tuomey, was opened by the President.
- Cecelia Ahern's first novel PS, I Love You was published.
- Arlene Hunt's first novel, the Dublin-set detective fiction Vicious Circle, was published.
- Colm Tóibín's novel The Master was published.

== Sport ==
=== Association football ===
- Football World Cup 2006 Qualification
  - Republic of Ireland 3–0 Cyprus
  - Northern Ireland 0–3 Poland
  - Republic of Ireland 1–1 Switzerland
  - Northern Ireland 2–2 Wales
  - Republic of Ireland 0–0 France
  - Northern Ireland 0–0 Azerbaijan
  - Republic of Ireland 2–0 Faroe Islands
  - Northern Ireland 0–0 Austria
- League of Ireland
  - Winners: Shelbourne
- FAI Cup Final
  - Longford Town 2–1 Waterford United
- UEFA Champions League

Shelbourne defeated KR Reykjavík in the first qualifying round on away goals. In the second qualifying round, Shelbourne lost the first leg 3–2 away to Hajduk Split, but two late goals in the home leg at Tolka Park meant they became the first Irish team to make it to the third qualifying round. After a 0–0 draw with Deportivo de La Coruña in front of 25,000 fans at Lansdowne Road, the Irish team lost 3–0 in Spain.

- UEFA Cup

Bohemians and Longford Town suffered disappointing first qualifying round defeats to FC Levadia Tallinn and FC Vaduz respectively. Shelbourne entered the first round proper after their Champions League third qualifying round exit, but missed out on a place in the UEFA Cup group stages. After a 2–2 draw at Lansdowne Road, Shelbourne lost 0–2 in the return leg against French side Lille.

=== Gaelic games ===
- All-Ireland Senior Hurling Championship Final 2004
  - Cork 0–17 – 0–9 Kilkenny
- All-Ireland Senior Football Championship Final 2004
  - Kerry 1–20 – 2–9 Mayo

=== Golf ===
- Ryder Cup
  - Three Irishmen, Pádraig Harrington, Darren Clarke, and Paul McGinley, featured prominently on the victorious European team.
- Nissan Irish Open was won by Brett Rumford (Australia).

=== Olympic Games ===
- Cian O'Connor and the horse Waterford Crystal won gold for Ireland in the equestrian event. O'Connor was later stripped of this title because the horse tested positive for a prohibited substance.

=== Rugby union ===
- 2004 Six Nations Championship
  - Ireland 19–3 Italy
  - Ireland 37–16 Scotland
  - Ireland 19–13 England
  - Ireland 17–35 France
  - Ireland 36–15 Wales
  - Ireland won the Triple Crown for the first time since 1985. The team also became the first to beat England since their World Cup win.
- 2003–04 Heineken Cup
  - Only Munster advanced from the group stage and were defeated in the semi-finals.

== Deaths ==
- 5 February – Harry West, leader of the Ulster Unionist Party from 1974 to 1979, Stormont MP, Minister for Agriculture (born 1917).
- 18 February – Tommy Eglington, soccer player (born 1923).
- 2 March – Cormac McAnallen, Tyrone Gaelic footballer (born 1980).
- 4 March – Paddy Ruschitzko, Laois hurler (born 1917).
- 6 March – Tom Leonard, Fianna Fáil TD (born 1924).
- 24 March – Richard Leech, actor (born 1922).
- 7 April – Maureen Potter, singer, actress and comedian (born 1925).
- 8 April – Enda Colleran, former Gaelic footballer (born 1941).
- 12 April – Sean Delaney, former soccer player and coach (born 1949).
- 11 May – Mick Doyle, rugby player and coach, killed in car crash (born 1941).
- 3 June – Joe Carr, amateur golfer (born 1922).
- 6 June – Simon Cumbers, journalist murdered in Saudi Arabia (born 1968).
- 8 June
  - Kit Lawlor, soccer player (born 1922).
  - Máirín Lynch, widow of former Taoiseach Jack Lynch (born 1916).
- 24 June – Douglas Gageby, journalist and editor of The Irish Times (born 1918).
- 23 July – Joe Cahill, former Chief of Staff of the Provisional Irish Republican Army (born 1920).
- 8 October – Fergus Bourke, photographer (born 1934).
- 16 November – Margaret Hassan, aid worker in Iraq, kidnapped and murdered by Iraqi insurgents (born 1945).
- 20 November – Ian Lewis, cricketer (born 1935).
- 8 December – Digby McLaren, geologist and palaeontologist in Canada (born 1919).
- 26 December – Frank Pantridge, physician, cardiologist and inventor of the portable defibrillator (born 1916).

Full date unknown

- George Harrison, member of the Provisional Irish Republican Army and alleged gun-runner (born 1915).

== See also ==
- 2004 in Irish television
