= Artist-Led Initiatives Support Network =

ALISN Artist-Led Initiatives Support Network
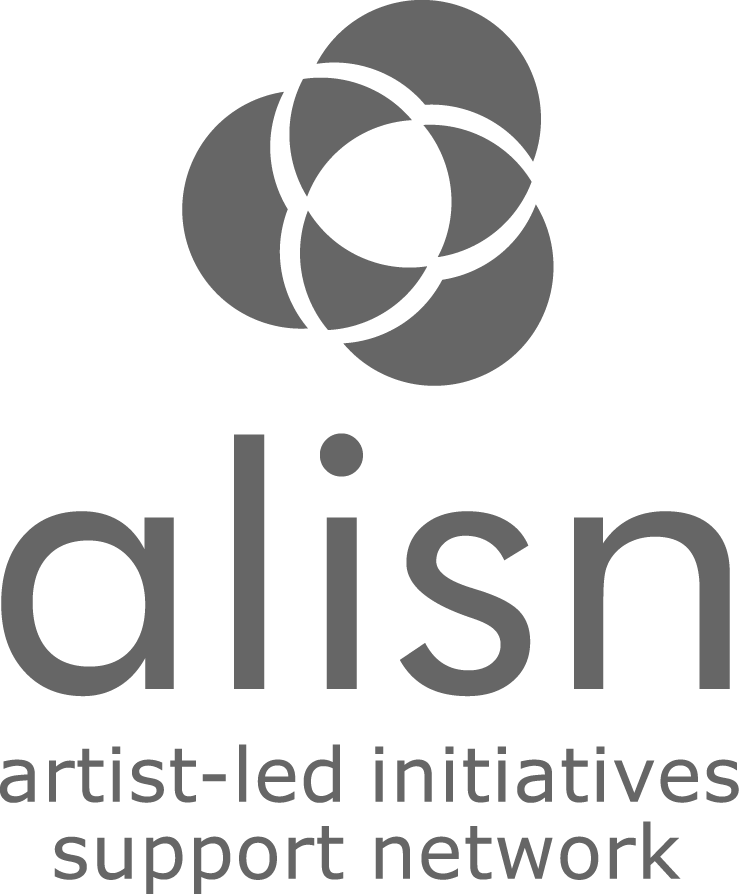
- Founded: November 2007
- Founder: Jordan Dalladay-Simpson & Iavor Lubomirov
- Type: Artist Network
- Location: London, UK
- Region served: Worldwide
- Method: Collaboration
- Members: 500+
- Volunteers: 5
- Website: alisn.org

Artist-Led Initiatives Support Network, abbreviated ALISN, is a non-profit international support network for artists which provides exhibition spaces, strategic support, education, creative facilitation and artist-to-artist exchange. ALISN was founded in 2007 by designer Jordan Dalladay-Simpson (Goldsmiths Alumnus) and artist Iavor Lubomirov (Oxford University Alumnus). ALISN was previously known as AFMMXII (Artists for 2012), and was officially re-branded as ALISN in August 2009.

== History ==
Artist-Led Initiatives Support Network began when Iavor Lubomirov and Jordan Dalladay-Simpson met in 2006 while organising a pop-up exhibition for art students and recent art graduates in a disused office building in London. At the time Lubomirov had recently left his art degree at University of East London and Dalladay-Simpson was an undergraduate studying design at Goldsmiths. Both founders were looking for ways of showing work and collaborating with other struggling artists to organise and promote art events. The show attracted over 300 visitors and laid the ground for future working relationships between the artists involved.

ALISN's next project was facilitating the Goldsmiths/BAA Expo Award 08, which would see two large-scale sculptures installed in the departures lounge of the newly opened Heathrow Terminal 5. This project was done in collaboration with BAA and Goldsmiths students, with mentor-ship from Cathy de Monchaux and Andrew Shoben and oversight from the global communications company Imagination. The two winning teams built and installed Arc and Taking Place. Arc was by London-based art-collective Lobby, and Taking Place by Sally Hogarth and Emma Johnson.

At the start of 2009, ALISN aided the formation of the Hackney Transients Art Project (HTAP), which is an east London arts organisation founded by Lucy Tomlins and Marnie Baumer. HTAP went on to produce two collaborative events that year, the workshop-based Pattern-making for Beginners as part of the annual HackneyWICKed Art Festival and In/Flux exhibition on Kingsland Road, Hackney, London. They also produced an Oral History Archive containing ethnographic recordings the opinions of various Hackney residents regarding the area's 'transient nature'. The project was also featured on the British Community Channel.

In August 2008, ALISN embarked on a second independent collaborative arts exhibition, under the name Art in the Carpark. This event took place in October, in the CCP Cark Park, Liverpool, and was in collaboration with the underground arts organisation The Arts Organisation (TAO). The event featured a diverse range of artwork from 14 Artists, and was part of the Liverpool Independents Biennial.

In the summer of 2009, a decision was made by the founders to find a name more appropriate to the way the organisation had been working, as well as reflecting the models of creative facilitation it had developed, AF2012 was re-branded as ALISN in August 2009.

In 2009 ALISN started a working relationship with Goldsmiths Creative Enterprise Society, launching this indefinite partnership with a talk entitled In Conversation with ALISN

At the start of 2010 the ALISN founders were gifted a stable home by a philanthropic London property developer. The Magnificent Basement is in Farringdon, Central London.
