= Greyworld =

London-based artist collective

Greyworld is a collective of London-based artists who create public-activated art, sculpture and interactive installations. Although often varied in their materials, their work is typically subtle and environmentally reflective, often allowing participants to play through the work. The following descriptions are of a few selected artworks.

== Beginnings ==
In 1993, Andrew Shoben founded Greyworld in Paris. Its goal was to create works that articulated public spaces, allowing some form of self-expression in areas of the city that people see every day but might normally ignore. Greyworld is now based in London, with permanent works in many major cities around the world.

== Works ==
=== Railings (1996) ===
The group's first public work of art was a series of temporary installations, Railings (1996), first created in Paris and widely copied. In each case Greyworld took a set of ordinary street railings and tuned them so that when you run a stick or an umbrella along them, rather than making a clacking sound, they played The Girl from Ipanema. Often created without permission, several instances of this installation have been removed.

=== Playground (1999) ===
In Playground, installed in the Yorkshire Sculpture Park in the UK, visitors stumbled across what looked like a deserted playground with faded markings for mysterious games and benches for spectators. All elements of the installation, the floor of the playground and the accompanying benches, had tiny sensors so that as people crossed the floor they triggered the sound of people playing a game whilst others sitting on the bench found themselves immersed in the sound of spectators cheering and clapping. The installation is a permanent feature of the sculpture park.

=== Bridge 2 (2000) ===
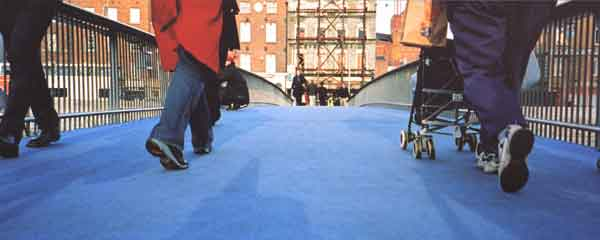
Bridge 2 by Greyworld, on the Millennium Bridge, Dublin

Most of Greyworld's early installations were sound-based. Bridge 2 drew on ideas that the artists had explored in Playground. In 2000, they installed a bright blue carpet across the length of the Millennium Bridge, which spans the Liffey River in Dublin, Ireland. Embedded into the carpet were hundreds of tiny sensors that translated the motion of people crossing the bridge into a vibrant soundscape. One moment it sounded as if people were walking through crunchy snow, the next that they were sploshing through water or walking across fallen leaves.

=== The Source (2004) ===
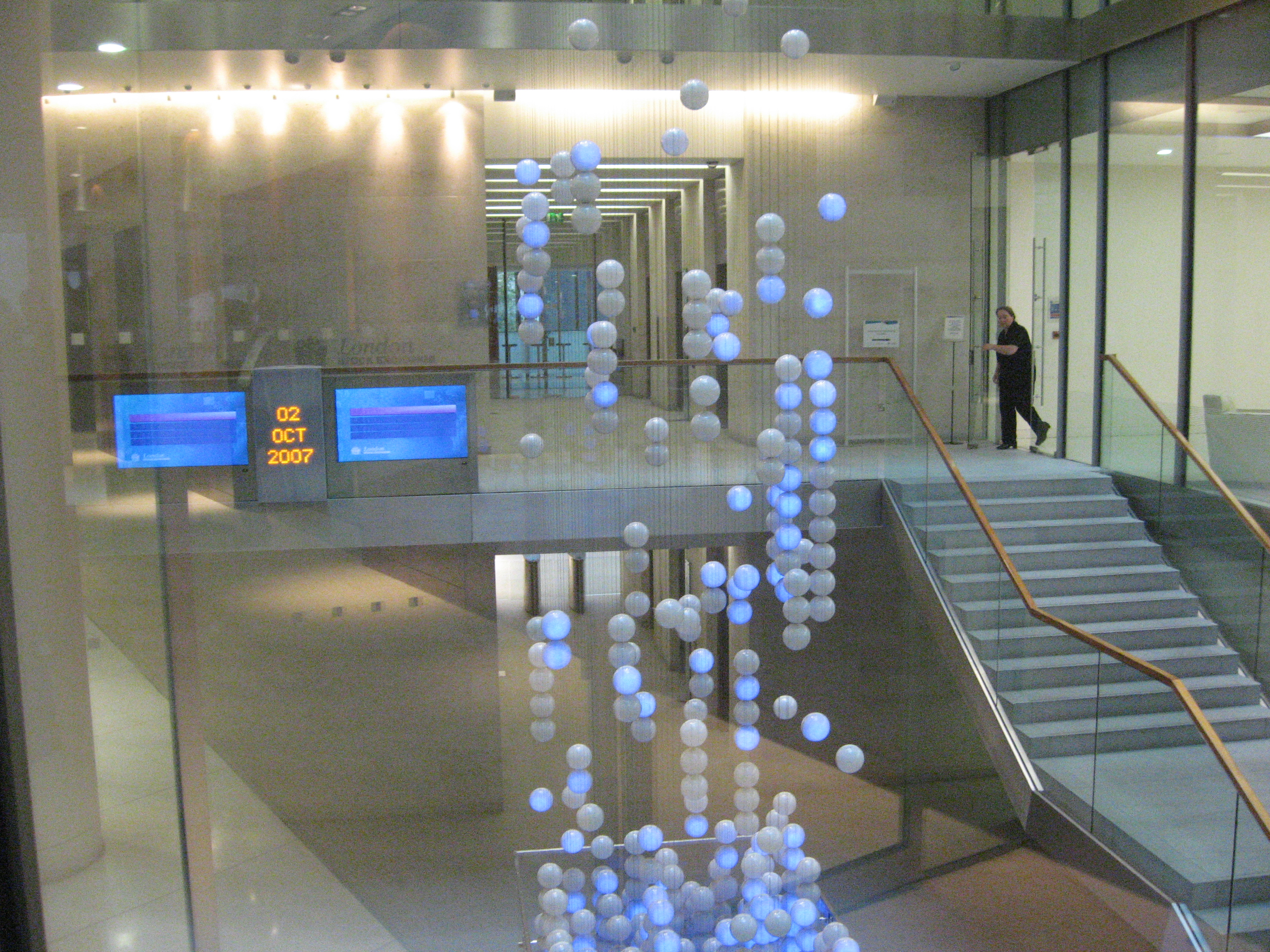
The Source by Greyworld, in the new LSE building

The Source is a permanent installation for the new London Stock Exchange: A cube of 9×9×9 (729 in total) spherical balls are suspended on cables that run the full 32 metres height of the main atrium of the newly designed building. These spheres, controlled by a computer running Python scripts, can move themselves independently of each other, forming dynamic shapes, characters and fluid-like motions that reflect the nature of the stock market. The sculpture opens the market each morning at 8 am, with the spheres breaking free from their default cube arrangement to form elegant patterns and shapes.

Throughout the day the sculpture responds to reputable news feeds and displays snapshots of the current headlines, written across the full height of the atrium. At the end of each day's trading the spheres return to their cubed arrangement, resting on the sculpture's base, and blue lights inside each sphere are illuminated to show the stock market's closing price with an arrow to indicate how the market performed on that day. Queen Elizabeth II unveiled the sculpture on 27 July 2004, and the opening was broadcast to a global audience. The installation is broadcast every morning on television to an estimated global audience of 80 million people. It was nominated for an Interactive BAFTA award in 2005.

=== Trace (2005) ===
Trace by Greyworld, at Hampton Court Palace, England

Trace (2005) was created for the maze at Hampton Court Palace, UK. Drawing on its history and the idea of a maze as a place of furtive conversation and flirtation, Greyworld created a gentle soundwork from the entrance to the centre and back again. As visitors pass through the many green corridors, they can follow sounds – a fragment of music, a snatch of laughter, the seductive rustle of fine silks or the whispers of an illicit conversation as it disappears around a corner and into a dead-end. Slowly the sounds weave together to create a tapestry of the other people who may have passed through the maze over the centuries.

=== Bins and Benches (2005) ===
Later that year they also created Bins and Benches, a permanent installation for a public square in Cambridge, UK. It features a group of animated street furniture that roams free, like buffalo, in the urban savannah of the square. When it rains the benches seek shelter under the nearby trees. As the temperature drops the bins start to shiver and when the sun shines the bins and benches break into song, singing in tight barbershop harmonies. Above all the bins and benches are still functional pieces of street furniture waiting for people to sit on them or deposit rubbish in their lids.

=== Worldbench (2005) ===
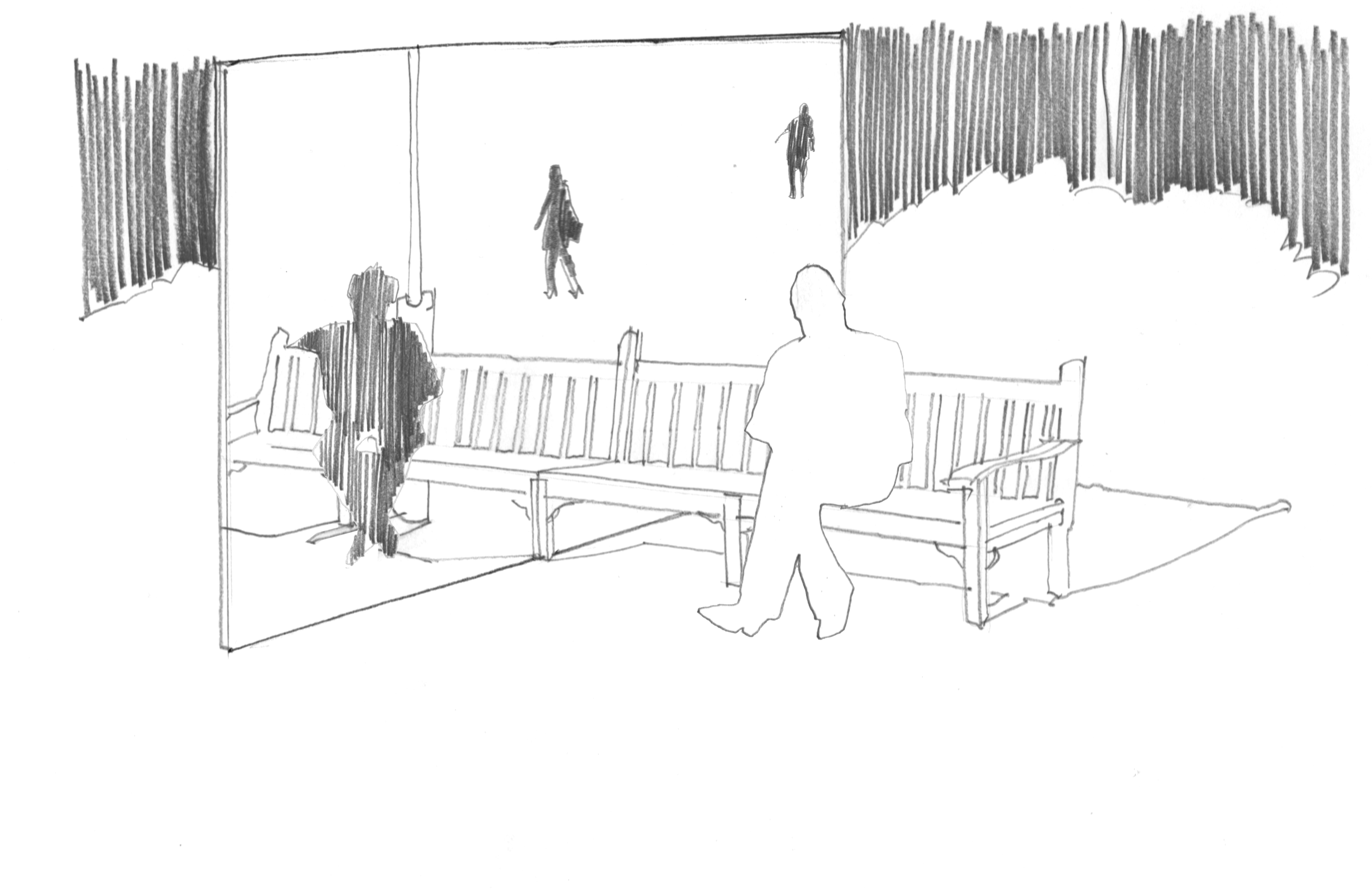
A drawing of Greyworld's Worldbench, a bench installation in various sites around the world

Worldbench (2005) is an installation that uses a park bench to link locations across the world. An ordinary wooden bench is placed against a screen, attached to a wall in the school's playground. Reflected on the screen is the mirror image of the bench, disappearing into the distance; but while one side of the bench is in South London, for example, the other could be in the north of England, or the other side of the world. Four Worldbenches have been created, with many more to be installed around the globe.

=== Monument to the Unknown Artist (2007) ===
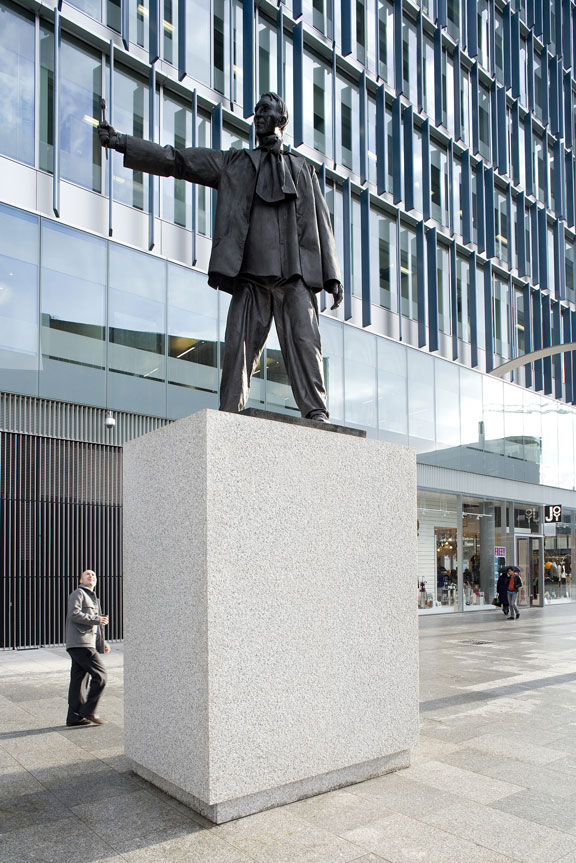
Monument to the Unknown Artist by Greyworld, London UK

In 2007, Greyworld launched Monument to the Unknown Artist beside the Tate Modern on London's Bankside. The permanent installation is a simple bronze statue, which stands around 20 feet high and depicts a man dressed in a neck scarf and loose-fitting suit.

=== Bloom (2007) ===
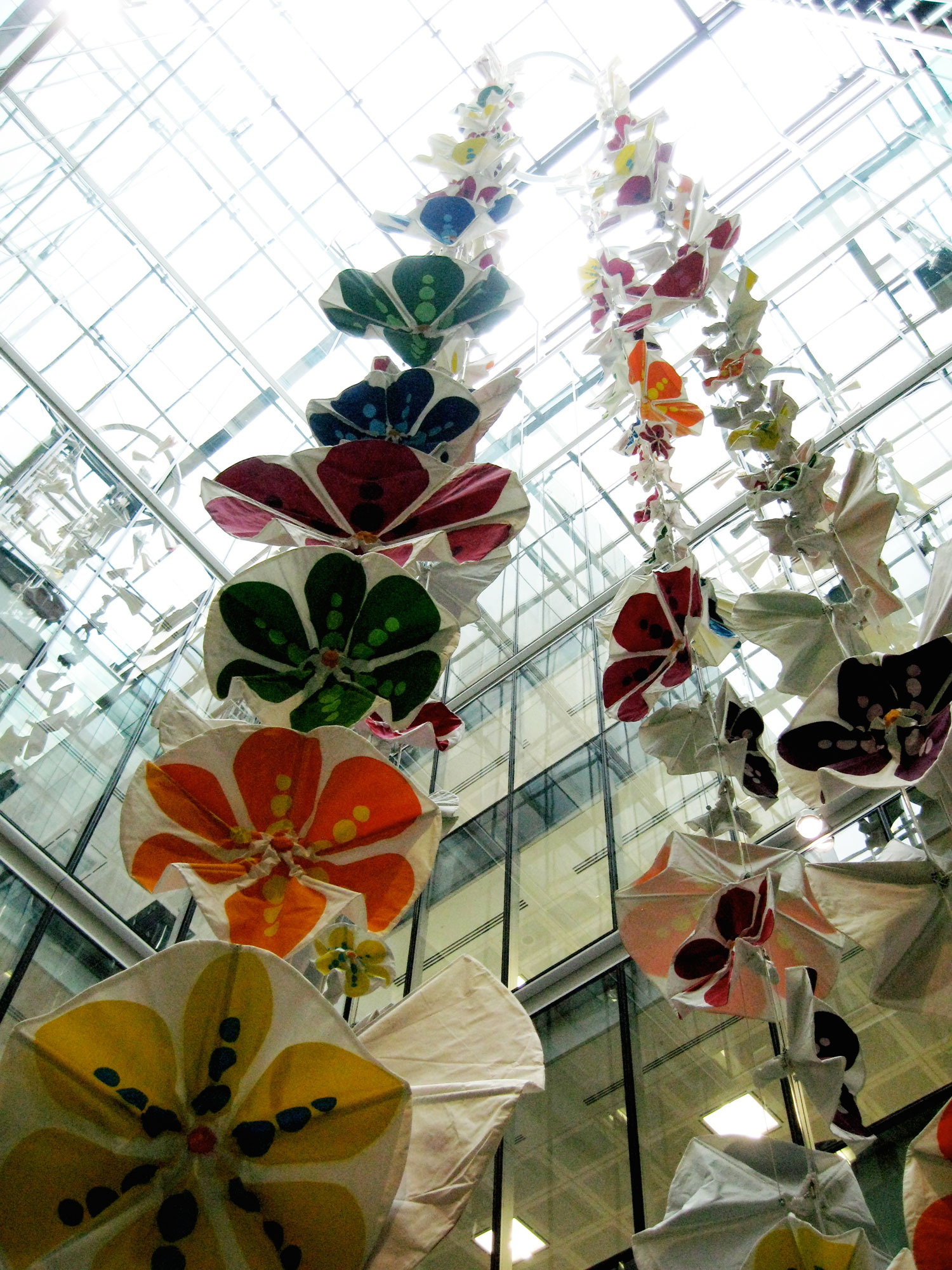
Bloom by Greyworld, London UK

The artists' installation for a new Fosters and Partners development in London's Spitalfields launched in 2007. Occupying the full height of the building's central 10-storey atrium, it uses hundreds of flowers, hidden within a seemingly sober column suspended within the space, to allow the building to bloom into life. They respond to the motion of those passing by, opening and closing, thus allowing every viewer interaction and influence over their environment.

=== Invisible (2007) ===
In 2006 Channel 4 chose seven sites across the United Kingdom to be part of The Big Art project. Burnley, East Lancashire was chosen to take part. Fifteen young people from throughout the region commissioned Greyworld to create a piece of public art. The artwork, Invisible, is a series of nineteen ultraviolet paintings placed around the town center displaying "public heroes" – outstanding local citizens who left their mark in the town. They appear as the nights grow longer throughout the year.

=== Clockwork Forest (2011) ===
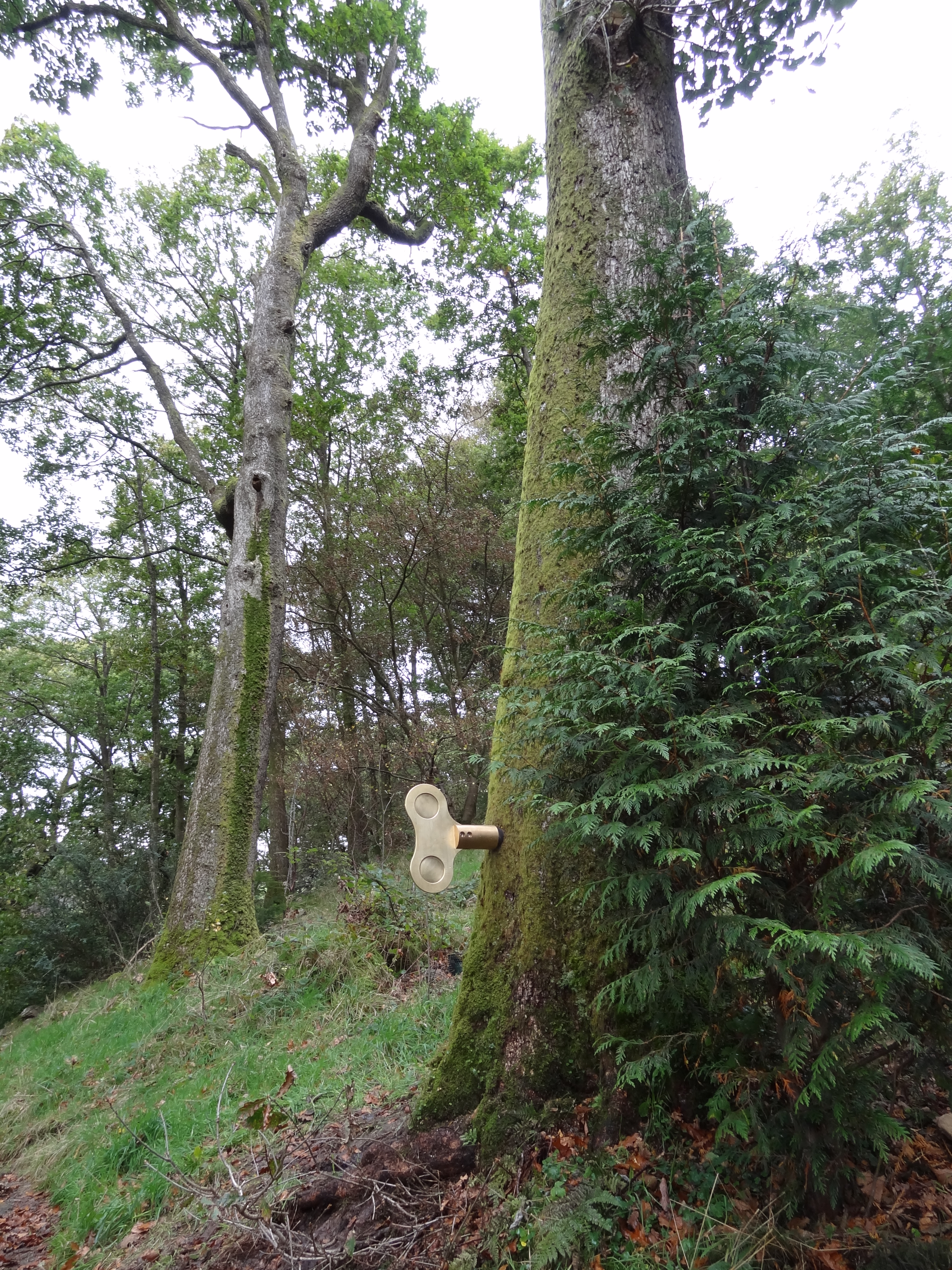
Clockwork Forest (2011)

A series of clockwork keys appeared throughout the Ridding Wood trail, in the Grizedale Forest, UK in October 2011. Each key, when turned, generated a music box melody that could be heard coming from the branches. A permanent work, it was commissioned by the National Forestry Commission.

=== Trafalgar Sun (2012) ===
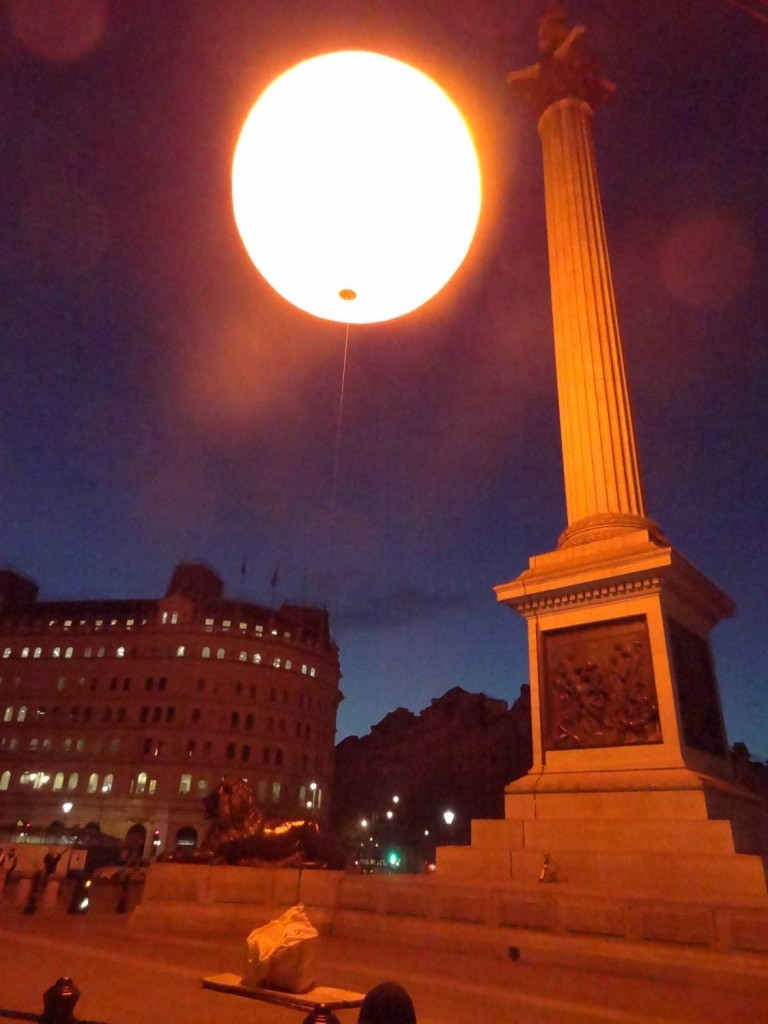
Trafalgar Sun photo

For its most recent artwork, Greyworld created a large spherical self illuminated "sun," which was installed in Trafalgar Square, London for one day only. Weighing 2.5 tons, and using 210,000 watts of power, it illuminated the square for three hours after sunset.
