= Andrew Shoben =

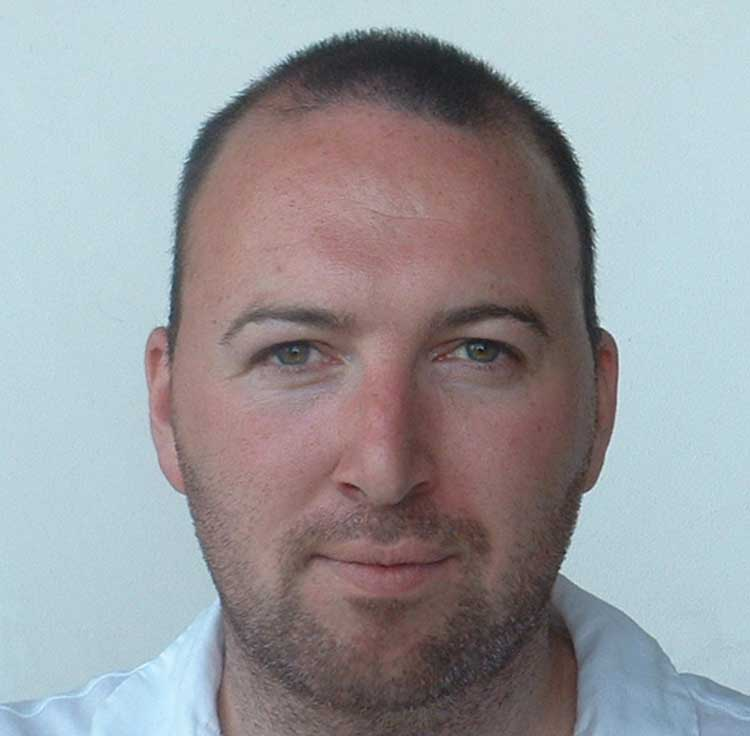
Professor Andrew Shoben

Andrew Matthew Shoben, FRBS FRSA (born 8th Nov. 1971, in London UK) is an English artist, academic and broadcaster. He is professor of Public Art and Computation at Goldsmiths, University of London as well as a Fellow of the Royal British Society of Sculptors and a Fellow of the Royal Society of the Arts. He is considered one of the world's leading practitioners of public art, especially in relation to digital and other interactive technologies.

As the founder of greyworld, a public art collective, he has lectured and broadcast on art in public spaces for BBC Radio and Channel 4 TV in the UK. His art is primarily concerned with the notions of play in urban space, and specifically the art systems that can be employed to this end.

Shoben is a contributor to the media and lectures regularly around the world, most notably at Design Indaba Conference (South Africa) in 2002 and again in 2012, Perth International Arts Festival (Australia), Berlin Film Festival (Germany) TEDx and 5D Immersive Design (Germany, Brazil). He is married to Charlene Shoben, CEO of the Tail Company, and has one son.
