= Ha'penny Bridge =

Footbridge over the River Liffey in Ireland

Ha'penny Bridge Droichead na Life
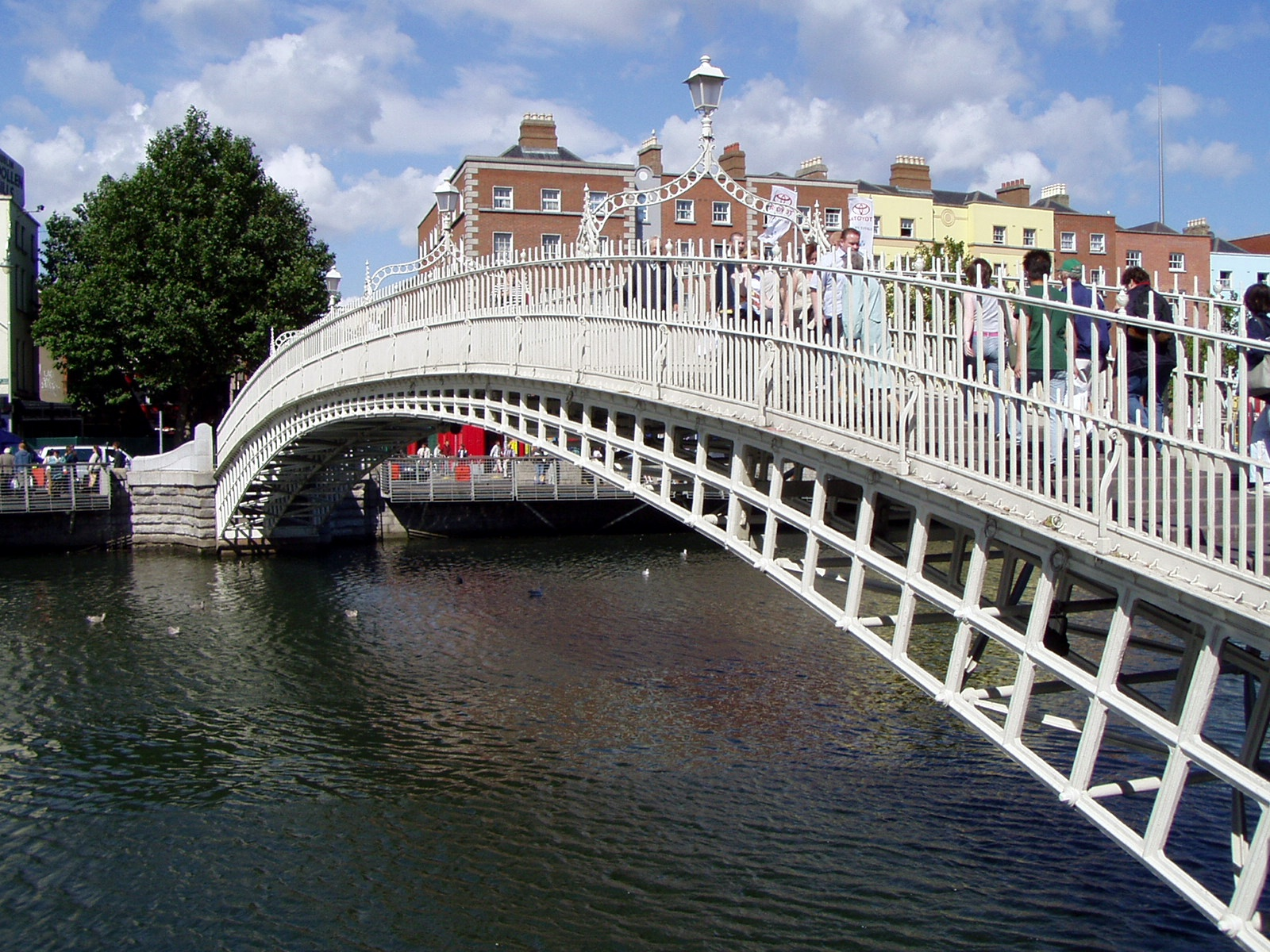
- Ha'penny Bridge in Dublin
- Coordinates: 53.3461°N 6.263°W
- Carries: Pedestrians
- Crosses: River Liffey
- Locale: Dublin, Ireland
- Other name(s): Liffey Bridge (official), Wellington Bridge (historical)
- Next upstream: Millennium Bridge
- Next downstream: O'Connell Bridge

Characteristics
- Design: Arch bridge
- Material: Cast iron (arch), wood (deck) Cement (deck) (2015)
- Total length: 43 m (141 ft) with a 3.35 m (11.0 ft) rise
- Width: 3.66 m (12.0 ft)
- No. of spans: 1

History
- Designer: John Windsor
- Opened: May 1816

Location
- Interactive map of Ha'penny Bridge

The Ha'penny Bridge (/ˈheɪpni/ HAYP-nee; Irish: Droichead na Leathphingine, or Droichead na Life), known later for a time as the Penny Ha'penny Bridge, and officially the Liffey Bridge, is a pedestrian bridge built in May 1816 over the River Liffey in Dublin, Ireland. Originally known as the Wellington Bridge, the bridge's cast iron structure was manufactured in Shropshire, England.

== Name ==
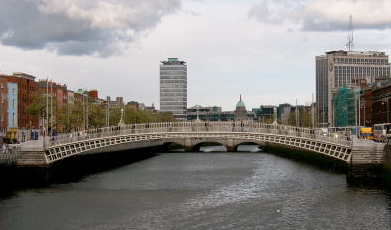
Dublin's Ha'penny Bridge; Beyond it, the dome of the eighteenth century Custom House and Liberty Hall.

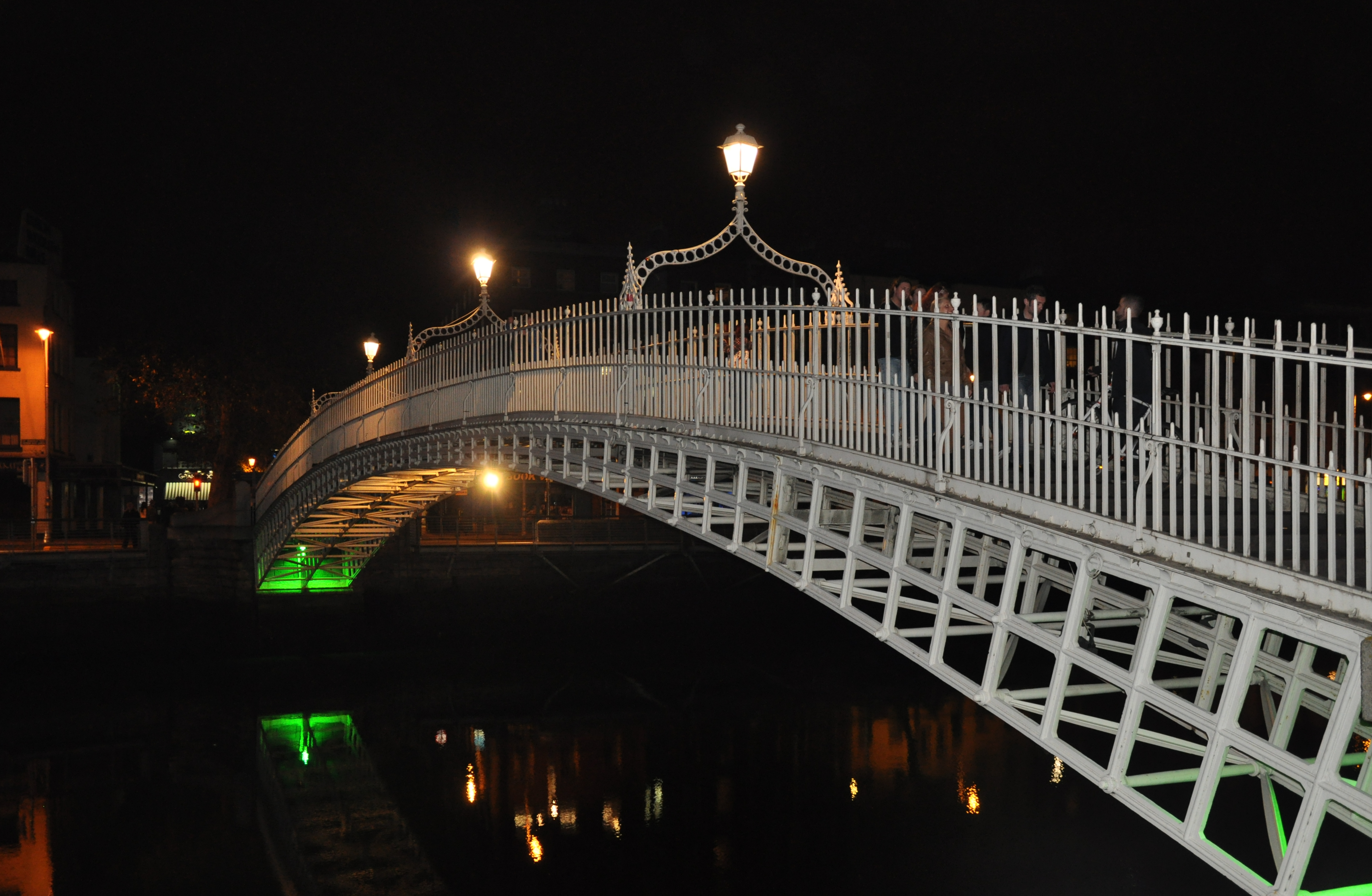
Ha'penny Bridge at night

Originally called the Wellington Bridge (after the Dublin-born Duke of Wellington), the name of the bridge was changed to Liffey Bridge after the Irish War of Independence in 1922. Liffey Bridge (Irish: Droichead na Life) remains the bridge's official name to this day, although it is most commonly referred to as the Ha'penny Bridge.

== History ==
Before the Ha'penny Bridge was built there were seven ferries, operated by William Walsh, across the Liffey. The ferries were in bad condition and Walsh was informed that he had to either fix them or build a bridge. Walsh chose the latter option and the bridge was opened in May 1816, with Walsh holding the right to extract a ha'penny toll from anyone crossing it for 100 years.

Initially, the toll charge was based not on the cost of construction, but to match the charges levied by the ferries it replaced. A further condition of construction was that, if the citizens of Dublin found the bridge and toll to be "objectionable" within its first year of operation, it was to be removed at no cost to the city.

The toll was increased for a time to a penny-ha'penny (1 1/2 pence), but was eventually dropped in 1919. While the toll was in operation, there were turnstiles at either end of the bridge.

The manufacture of the bridge was commissioned by the then Lord Mayor of Dublin, John Claudius Beresford with the Coalbrookdale Company of England. Using ore originally mined in County Leitrim's Sliabh an Iarainn, the bridge's cast iron ribs were made in 18 sections and then shipped to Dublin. The design and erection was supervised by John Windsor, one of the company's foremen and a pattern-maker.

In 1890, the bridge was noted in a tourist guidebook to Ireland: "Up-stream, the Liffey, though of insignificant width, is fringed by a continuous line of quays on either bank. The nearest bridge in that direction is variously known as Wellington or Metal Bridge, an iron structure of a single span, but of little beauty."

== Renovation and maintenance ==
In 2001, the number of pedestrians using the bridge on a daily basis was 27,000 and, given these traffic levels, a structural survey indicated that renovation was required. The bridge was closed for repair and renovations during 2001 and was reopened in December 2001, sporting its original white colour.

The structure was rebuilt to retain many of its old components, although, controversially, some features were removed. The repair work was carried out by Harland & Wolff.

In 2012, citing a maintenance and damage risk, Dublin City Council removed a number of love locks from the Ha'penny Bridge and nearby Millennium Bridge, and asked people not to add any more. In 2013, the council removed over 300 kilograms (660 lb) of locks from the bridge, and signage was added asking people not to put padlocks on the bridge.

On 19 May 2016, the bicentenary of the bridge was celebrated with a symbolic procession over the bridge involving the current Lord Mayor, Críona Ní Dhálaigh, descendants of J. C. Beresford and John Windsor from England.
