= 2004 in Irish television =

The following is a list of events relating to television in Ireland from 2004.

== Events ==
=== January ===
- January – The licence fee increases by €2.

=== February ===
- 2 February – The Granada plc share of TV3 is taken over by ITV plc upon the merger of Granada with Carlton.

=== May ===
- 24 May – Sky News Ireland is launched.

=== June ===
- June – The Public Service Broadcasting Charter is published by Dermot Ahern, the Minister for Communications, Marine and Natural Resources.

=== September ===
- 29 September – Noel Dempsey is appointed Minister for Communications, Marine and Natural Resources.

=== October ===
- 2 October – Network 2 is rebranded as RTÉ Two.

=== November ===
- November – RTÉ publishes its RTÉ Guiding Principles – Implementing the Public Service Broadcasting Charter.

== Debuts ==
=== RTÉ ===
- 3 January – Balamory on RTÉ Two (2002–2005)
- 5 January – Proof on RTÉ One (2004–2005)
- 16 January – Super Duper Sumos on RTÉ Two (2002–2003)
- 14 March – Jacob Two-Two on RTÉ Two (2003–2006)
- 23 March – Snailsbury Tales on RTÉ Two (2002–2005)
- 4 May – Astro Boy on RTÉ Two (2003–2004)
- 30 June – Fergus McPhail on RTÉ Two (2004)
- 4 September – Little Red Tractor on RTÉ Two (2004–2007)
- 7 September – Kid Paddle on RTÉ Two (2003–2006)
- 14 September – Pingu on RTÉ Two (2003–2006)
- 9 September – Hanging with Hector on RTÉ One (2004–2008)
- 18 October – Tubridy Tonight on RTÉ One (2004–2009)
- 1 November – Foreign Exchange on RTÉ Two (2004)
- Autumn – The Afternoon Show on RTÉ One (2004–2010)
- Undated – Ryan Confidential on RTÉ One (2004–2010)
- Undated – Tractor Tom on RTÉ Two (2002–2004)

=== TG4 ===
- 6 January – X-DuckX (2001–2006)

== Changes of network affiliation ==
Shows	Moved from	Moved to
Godzilla: The Series	TV3	RTÉ Two
Big Guy and Rusty the Boy Robot	TV3	RTÉ Two
Looney Tunes	RTÉ Two	TG4

== Ongoing television programmes ==
=== 1960s ===
- RTÉ News: Nine O'Clock (1961–present)
- RTÉ News: Six One (1962–present)
- The Late Late Show (1962–present)

=== 1970s ===
- The Late Late Toy Show (1975–present)
- RTÉ News on Two (1978–2014)
- The Sunday Game (1979–present)

=== 1980s ===
- Dempsey's Den (1986–2010)
- Questions and Answers (1986–2009)
- Fair City (1989–present)
- RTÉ News: One O'Clock (1989–present)

=== 1990s ===
- Would You Believe (1990s–present)
- Winning Streak (1990–present)
- Prime Time (1992–present)
- Nuacht RTÉ (1995–present)
- Fame and Fortune (1996–2006)
- Nuacht TG4 (1996–present)
- Ros na Rún (1996–present)
- A Scare at Bedtime (1997–2006)
- The Premiership/Premier Soccer Saturday (1998–2013)
- Sports Tonight (1998–2009)
- TV3 News (1998–present)
- The View (1999–2011)
- Ireland AM (1999–present)
- Telly Bingo (1999–present)

=== 2000s ===
- Nationwide (2000–present)
- TV3 News at 5.30 (2001–present)
- You're a Star (2002–2008)
- Play it Again Des (2003–2005)
- Auld Ones (2003–2007)
- Killinaskully (2003–2008)
- The Clinic (2003–2009)
- The Panel (2003–2011)
- Against the Head (2003–present)
- news2day (2003–present)
- Other Voices (2003–present)

== Ending this year ==
- April – Open House (1999–2004)
- 23 July – All Kinds of Everything (2003–2004)
- 14 August – Agenda (1999–2004)
- 29 October- Reeling In the Years but was back with 2000's in 2010 & 2010's in 2021.

== See also ==
- 2004 in Ireland
