= Adi Nes =

Israeli photographer

Adi Nes עדי נס
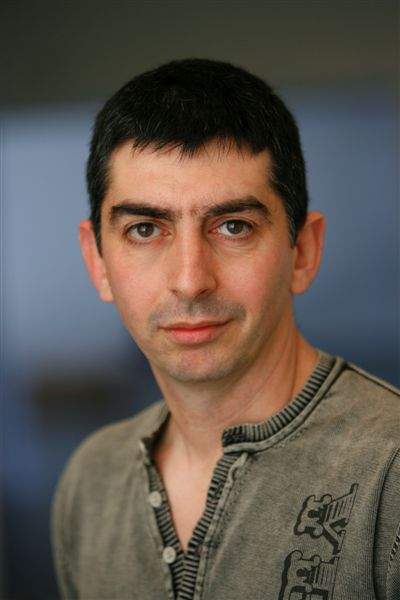
- Born: 1966 (age 59–60); Kiryat Gat, Israel
- Known for: photography

Adi Nes (Hebrew: עדי נס; born 1966) is an Israeli photographer. He has had solo exhibitions at Wexner Center for the Arts in Columbus, Ohio and the Legion of Honor in San Francisco.

== Life and career ==
Adi Nes was born in Kiryat Gat. His parents are Jewish immigrants from Iran. He is openly gay. Nes studied photography at Bezalel Academy of Arts and Design in Jerusalem in 1989 to 1992.

Nes' series "Soldiers" mixes masculinity and homoerotic sexuality, depicting Israeli soldiers in a fragile way.

Nes' "The Last Supper" recalls Leonardo da Vinci's The Last Supper, replacing the characters with young male Israeli soldiers. A print sold at auction in Sotheby's for $102,000 in 2005, and another for $264,000 in 2007.

Nes' early work has been characterized as subverting the stereotype of the masculine Israeli man by using homoeroticism and sleeping, vulnerable figures. He regularly uses dark-skinned Israeli models. The models' poses often evoke the Baroque period. Nes has said that the inspiration for his photography is partially autobiographical:

My staged photographs are oversized and often recall well-known scenes from Art History and Western Civilization combined with personal experiences based on my life as a gay youth growing up in a small town on the periphery of Israeli society.

— Adi Nes

Nes lives and works in a small town at the north of Tel Aviv, he and his partner have four surrogate children. His work is currently sold through Jack Shainman Gallery in New York City and Praz-Delavallade in Paris and Los Angeles. In January 2007, he premiered a new series echoing Biblical stories.

== Solo exhibitions ==
- Between Promise and Possibility: The Photographs of Adi Nes, Legion of Honor, San Francisco, 2004
- Biblical Stories, Wexner Center for the Arts, Columbus, Ohio, 2008

== Awards and prizes ==
- 1993: Ministry of Education Council for Prize for Completion of Work, Ministry of Culture and Education
- 1999: The Minister of Education, Culture and Sport Prize, The Ministry of Education, Culture and Sport
- 2000: Nathan Gottesdiener Foundation, The Israeli Art Prize, Tel Aviv Museum of Art, Tel Aviv
- 2003: The Constantiner Photographer Award for an Israeli Artist, Tel Aviv Museum of Art
- 2005: Chosen as an outstanding artist of the Israel Cultural Excellence Foundation.
- 2013: Culture & Sport Minister's Prize for Artists in the Visual Arts

== Gallery ==
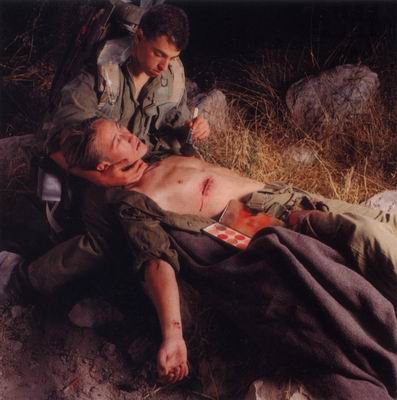
Untitled, from series "Soldiers", 90 x 90 / 140 x 140 cm., 1995.

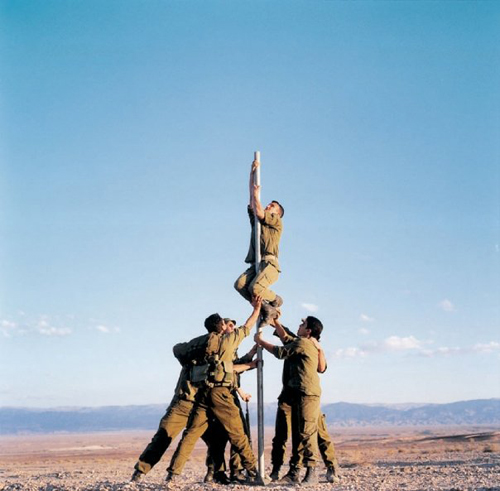
Untitled, from series "Soldiers", 90 x 90 / 140 x 140 cm., 1998.

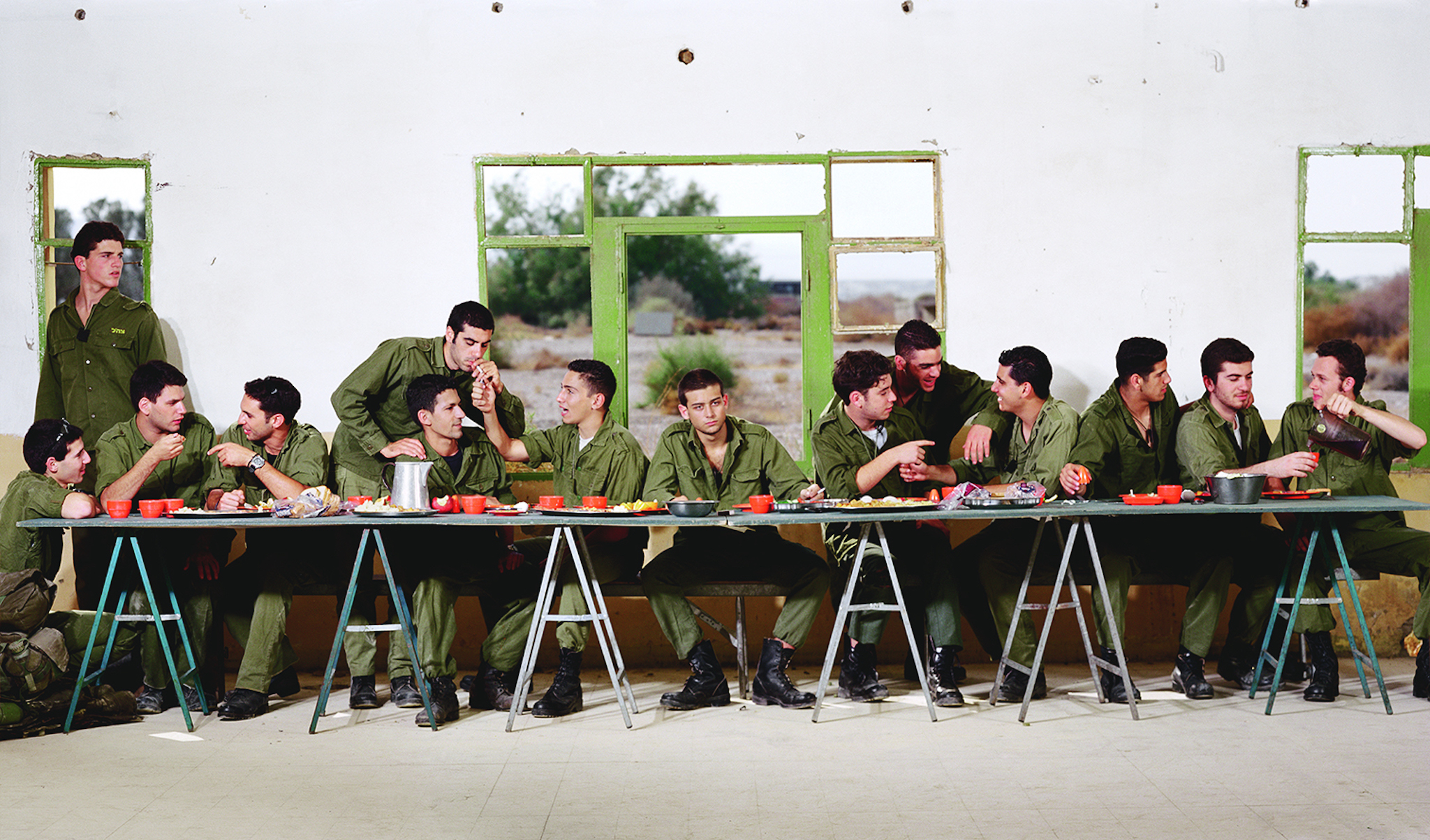
Untitled (The Last Supper), from series "Soldiers", 90 x 148 / 185 x 235, 1999.

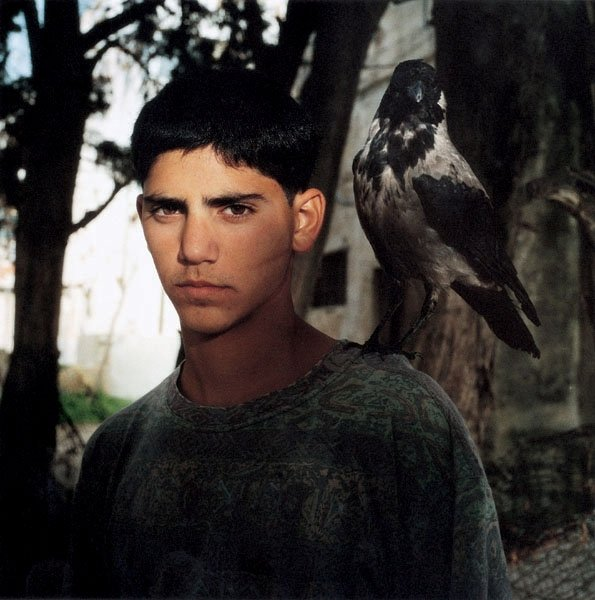
Untitled, from series "Boys", 100 x 100 / 140 x 140 cm., 2000.

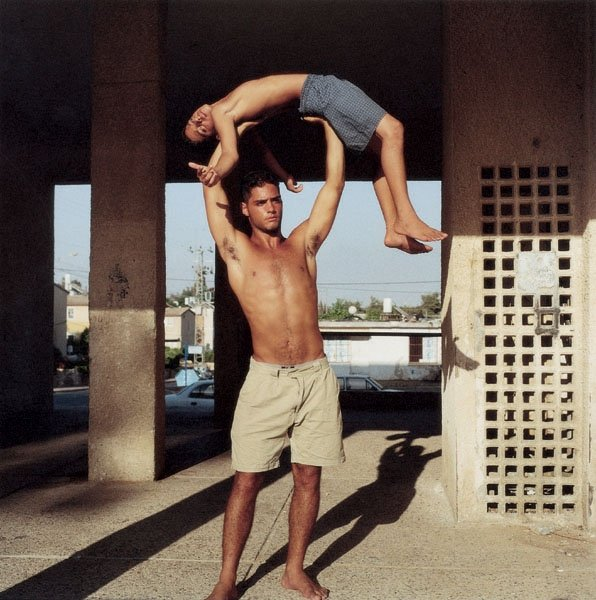
Untitled, from series "Boys", 100 x 100 / 140 x 140 cm., 2000.

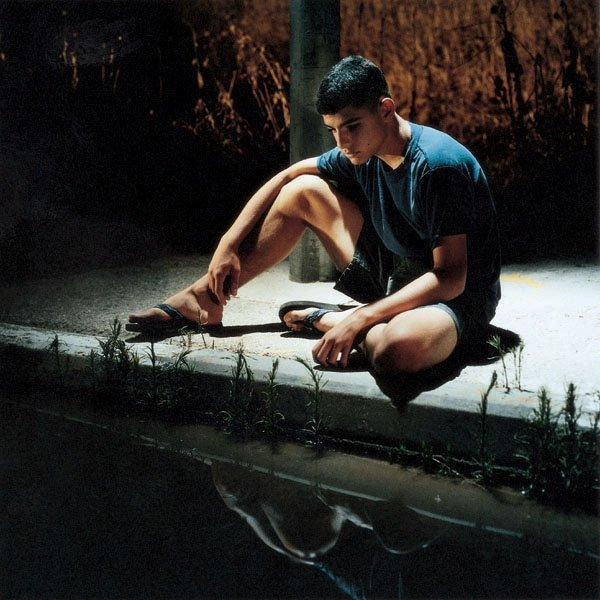
Untitled (Narcissus), from series "Boys", 100 x 100 / 140 x 140 cm., 2000.

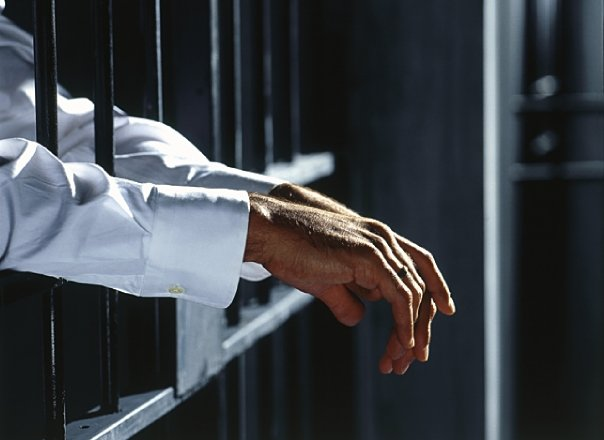
Untitled, from series "Prisoners", 60 x 82 / 90 x 123 cm., 2003.

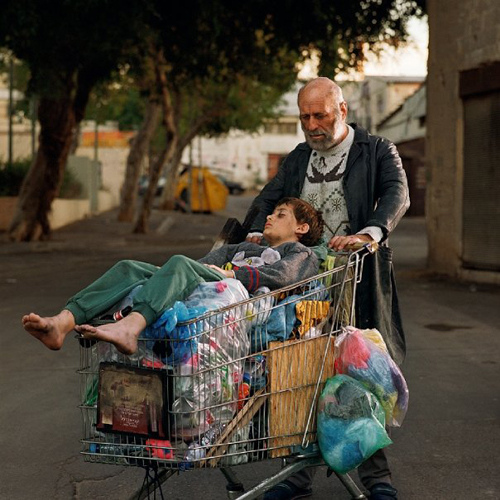
Untitled (Abraham and Isaac), from series "Biblical Stories", 100 x 100 / 140 x 140 cm., 2004.

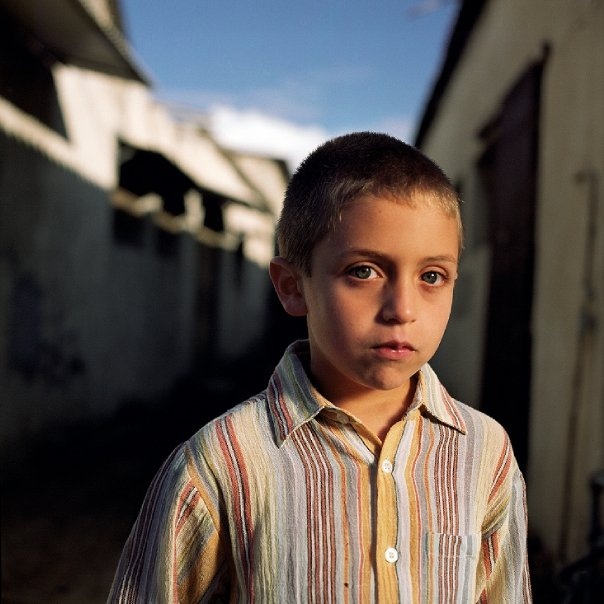
Untitled (Joseph), from series "Biblical Stories", 100 x 100 / 140 x 140 cm., 2004.

From the Series "The Village" by Nes:

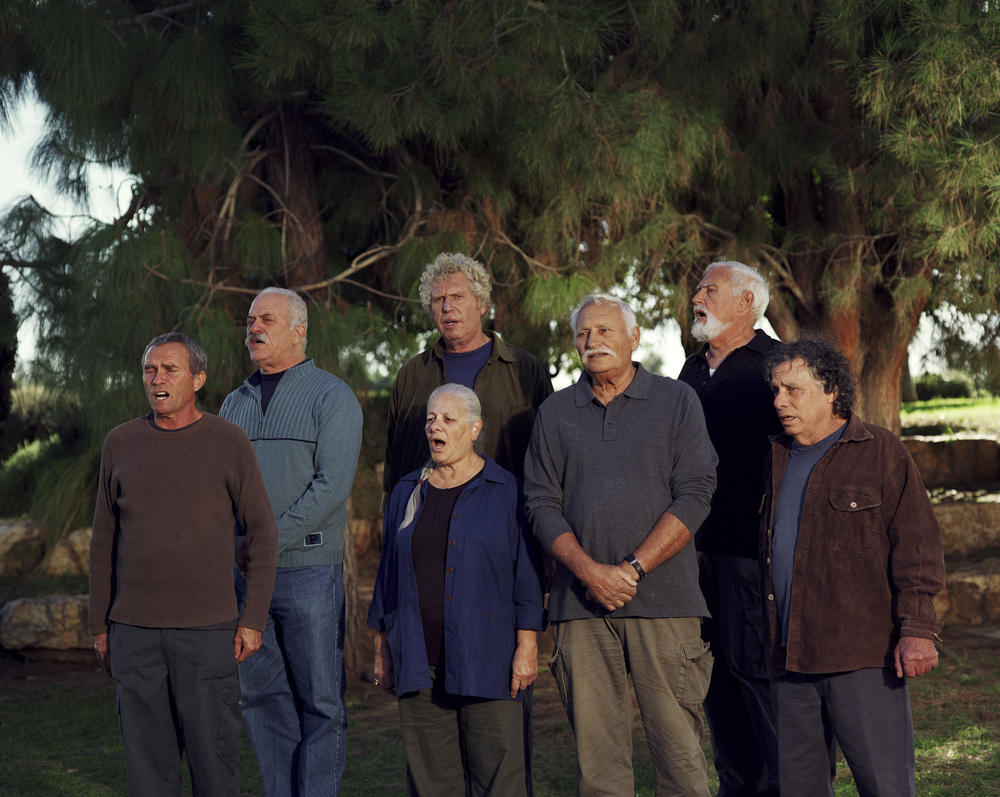
Untitled , 2009

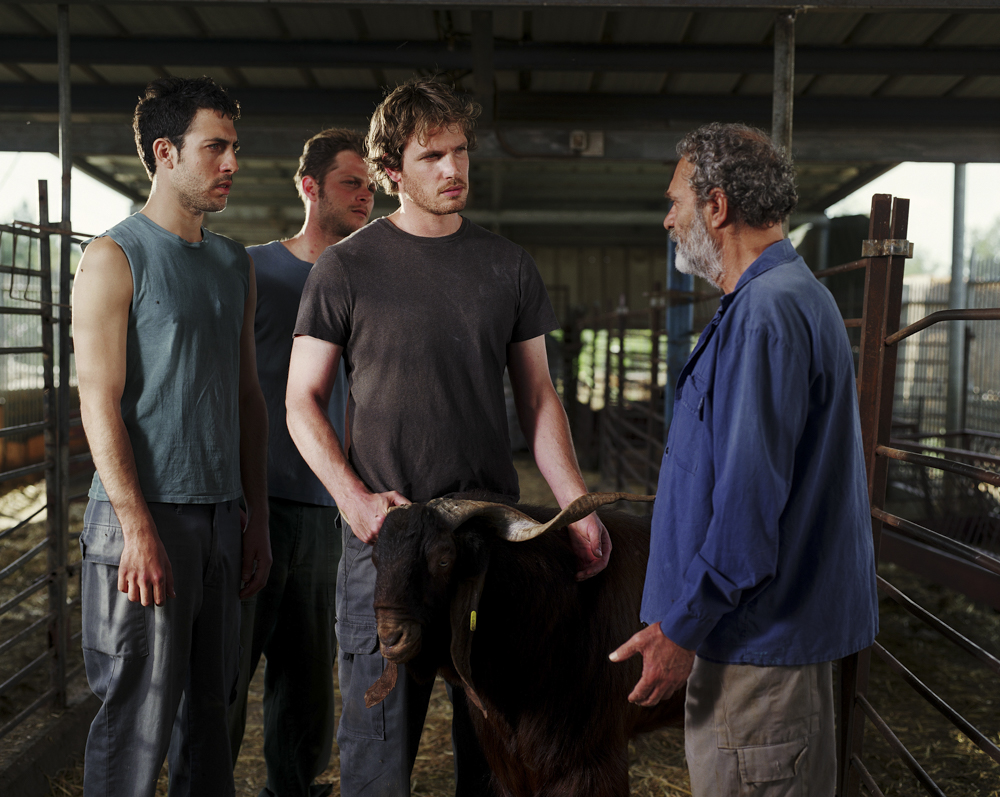
Untitled , 2009

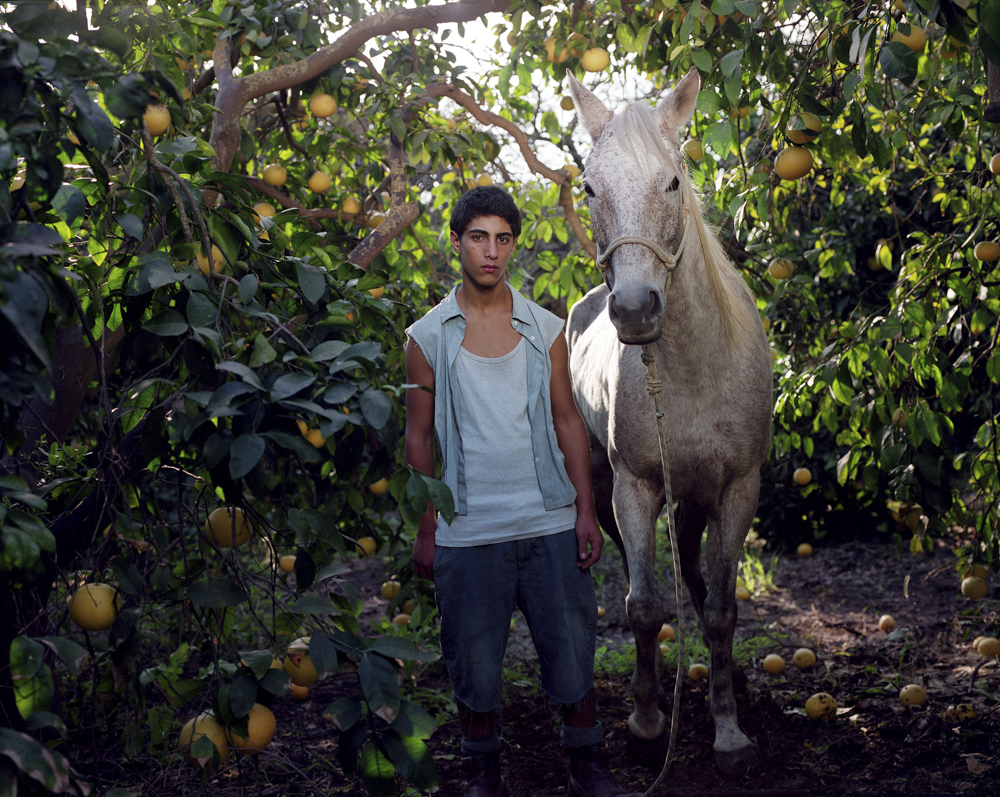
Untitled , 2008

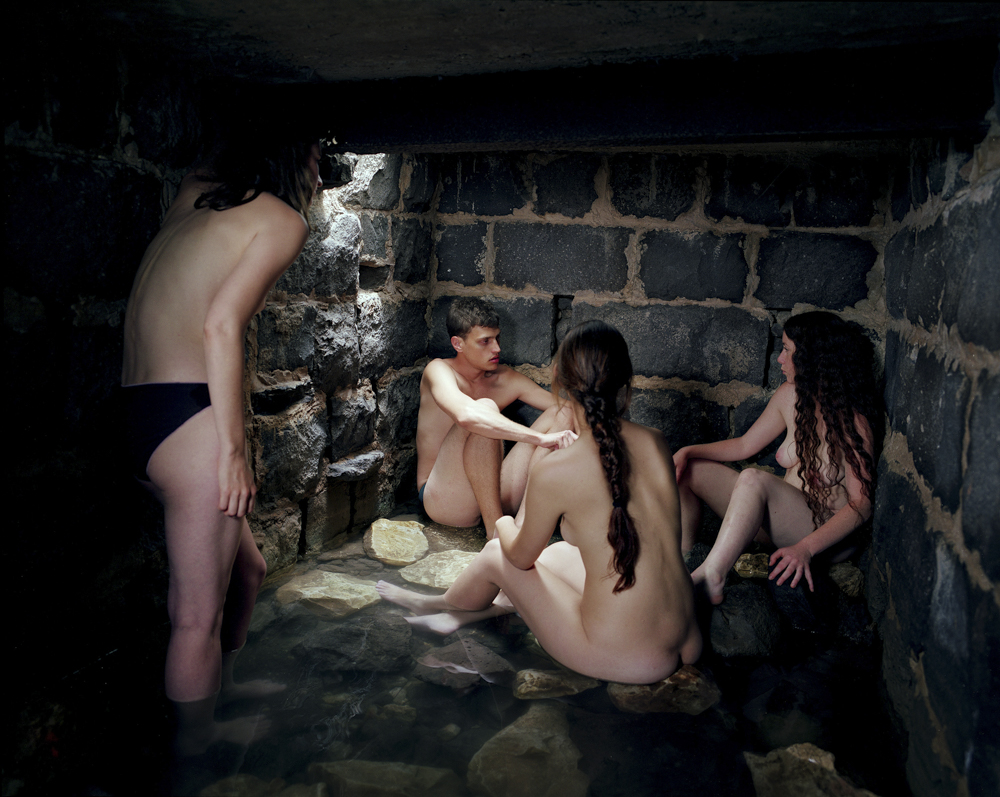
Untitled , 2011

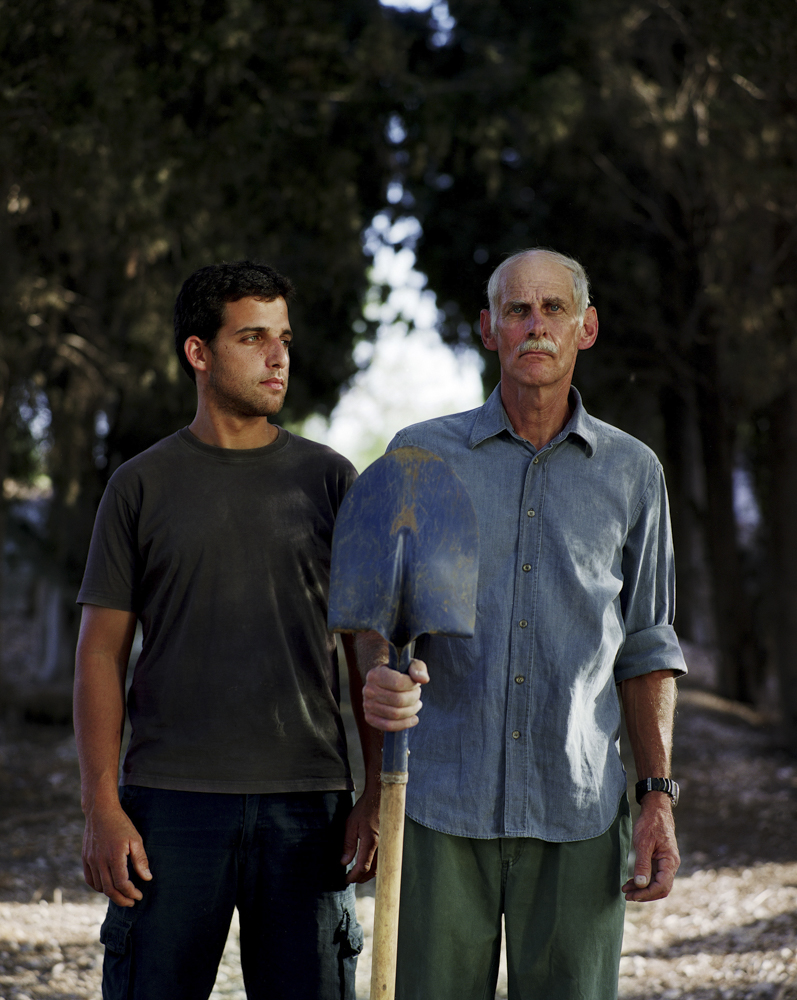
Untitled , 2008

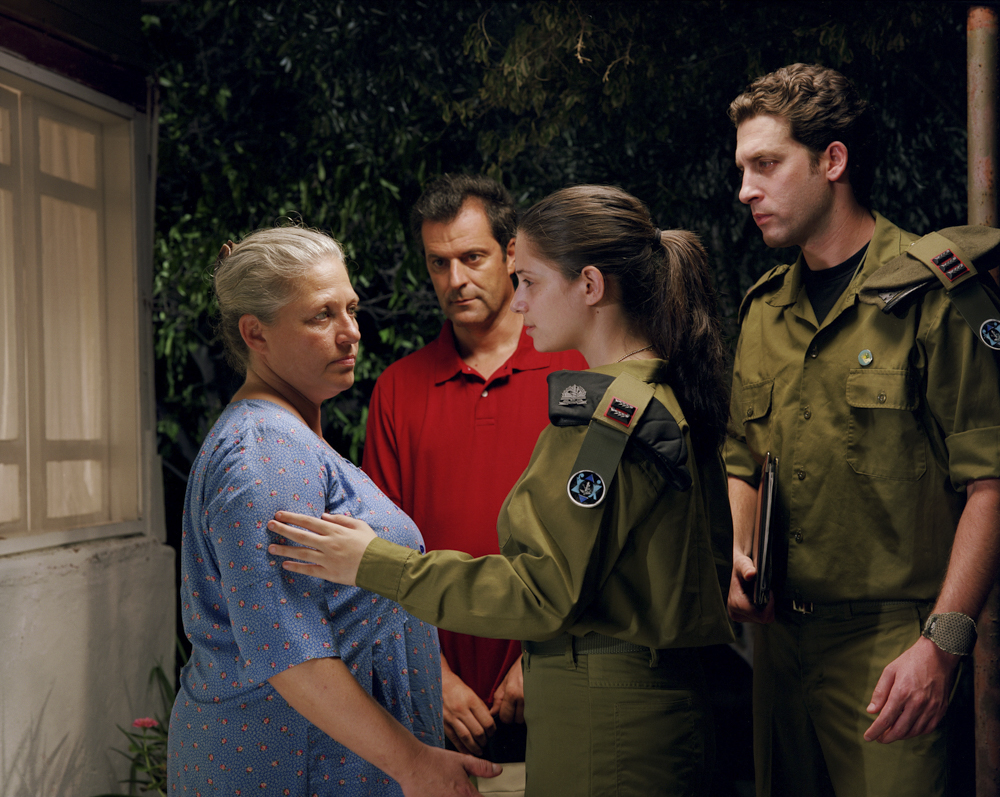
Untitled , 2010

== General references ==
- Gal, Nissim1. 2010. "The Language of the Poor: Bible Stories as a Critical Narrative of the Present." Images: Journal of Jewish Art & Visual Culture 4, no. 1: 82-108. Art & Architecture Source, March 27, 2017.
