= The Last Supper (photograph) =

1999 photograph by Adi Ness

- סעודה האחרונה (Hebrew)
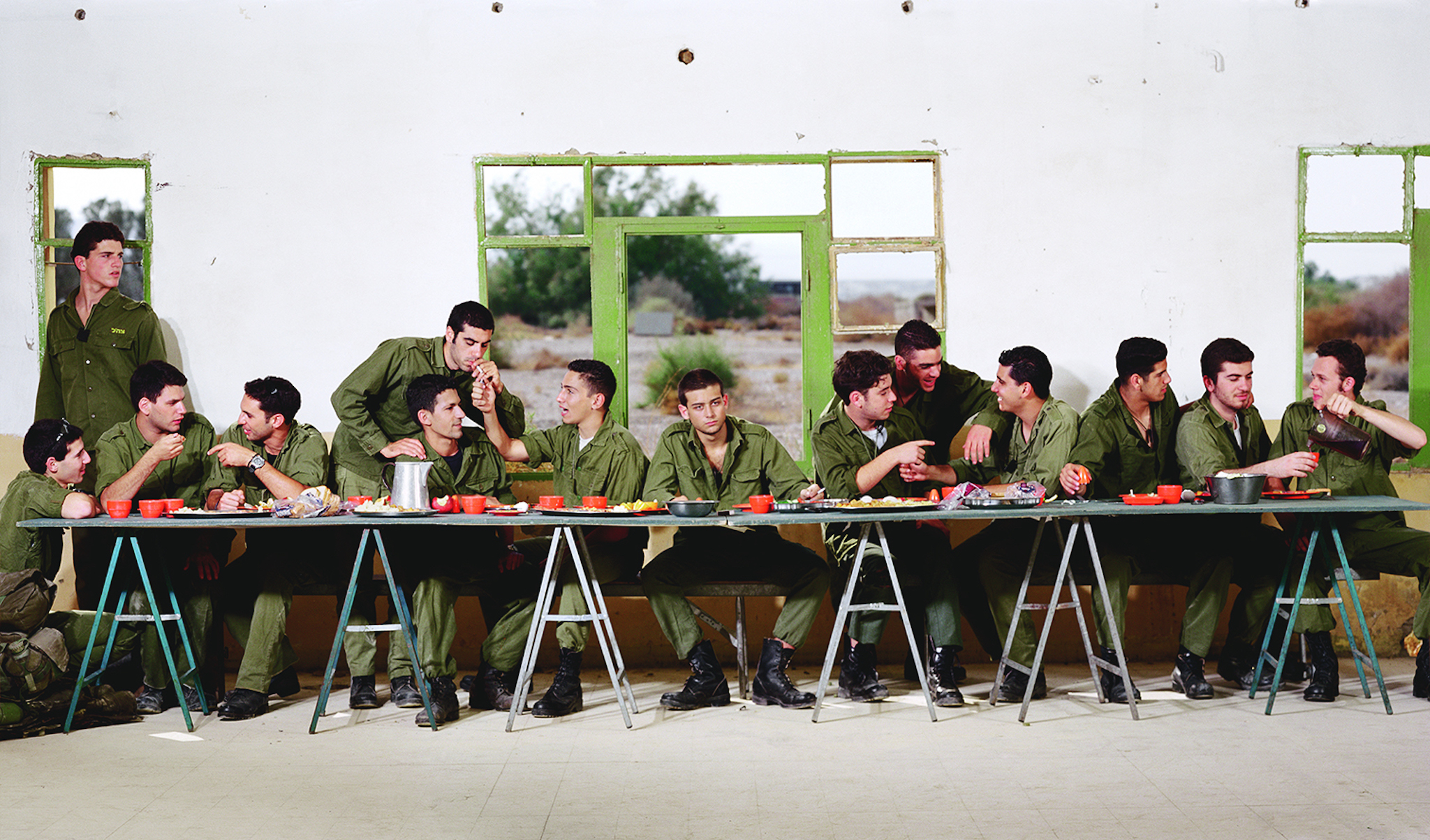
- Artist: Adi Nes
- Completion date: 1999
- Medium: Photography
- Location: Israel Museum; Jerusalem

Untitled, better known as The Last Supper (Hebrew: סעודה האחרונה), is a 1999 photo by Israeli photographer Adi Nes. Inspired by Leonardo da Vinci's famous late-15th century painting of the same name, the photo features 14 Israeli soldiers in a setting reminiscent of the Last Supper. Nes created The Last Supper to reflect the idea that death is ever-present in Israeli society, not only in combat but also in daily life. By portraying the soldiers as both Jesus and Judas Iscariot, Nes sought to emphasize the vulnerability and fragility of their lives. The photograph hints at the possibility that this meal could be the last for any of the soldiers.

The photo portrays fourteen Israeli soldiers in an abandoned barracks with traditional army dinnerware. Unlike the original painting, Nes' version lacks tension and shows the soldiers in private conversations, while the central figure (Jesus) "stares vacantly into space". The artist does not provide a specific interpretation but expresses sympathy and hope that it is not their last meal together. One extra person is added to avoid "direct quotation" of Leonardo da Vinci. The fourteenth man (standing at the left) is the only one, apart for the central figure, who is not engaged in a conversation and looks apart, and the only one whose uniform shows the Israel Defense Forces patch.

The photo was sold for $264,000 (equivalent to $370,000 in 2025) at Sotheby’s in 2012, the highest price paid for any Israeli photo. The original print is currently in the Israel Museum in Jerusalem.

== Background ==
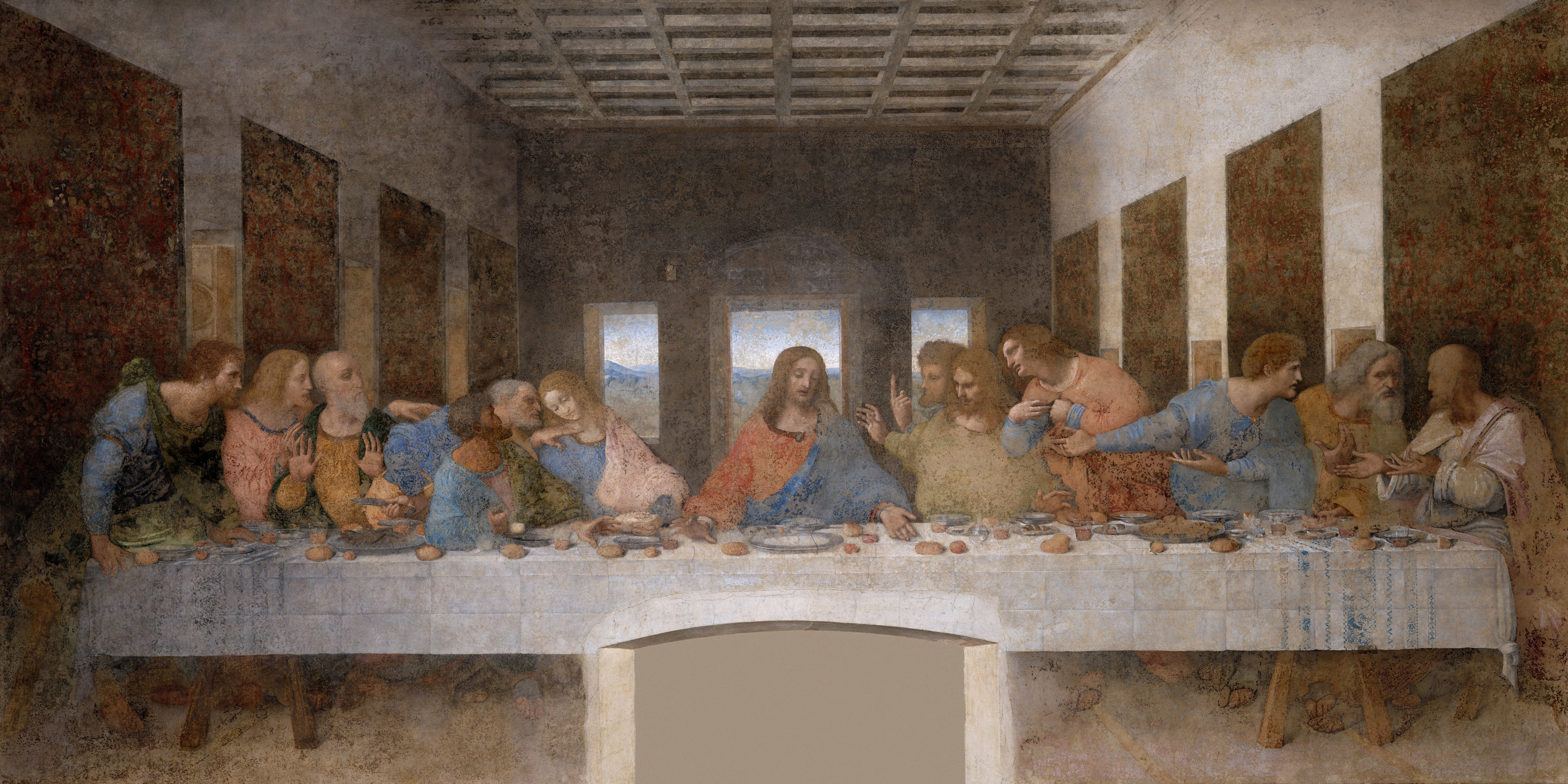
Depictions of the Last Supper in Christian art have been undertaken by artistic masters for centuries, Leonardo da Vinci's late-1490s mural painting in Milan, Italy, being the best-known example.

I wanted to express the idea that in Israel, death lingers. Death is being foreshadowed in most of these pictures. Israelis are dying not only in combat, but in their daily activity – from bombs on buses, suicide bombers in restaurants. The moment you serve as a soldier, you choose to give yourself over to the society, to the army, to someone else. You have to take the possibility you're going to die. Here, I tried to incorporate the idea that this supper may be the last for any of them, not just Jesus. All of them are Jesus, all of them are Judas.

— Adi Nes

Adi Nes was born in 1966 in Kiryat Gat, near the Gaza Strip, one year before the Six-Day War. Nes said that his mother sang him songs about "stereotypically depicted" men, "a soldier, or a father, or both." His parents made aliyah from Iran; his father faked his age to be conscripted to the army. "By the time he was discharged, he was a different man." Nes also served in the army, and said that he was very proud of it. He describes the sense of unity he felt joining the army:

I saw myself as a queer, weak, sensitive Mizrahi boy from the periphery, different from everyone else. But very quickly, already during basic training, I felt that I was part of this great power. The IDF uniform worked like a magic cloak. I was part of an ultra-masculine unit – we were completely devoted to one, and one to all. The long distance and time away from home and the intensive stay with my friends made me feel that they were my new family, the military ethos binding us together. I felt we were one.

Nes drew inspiration from the works of artists often considered to be gay, such as Leonardo da Vinci, Caravaggio, Pier Paolo Pasolini, and Michelangelo. At the time he began his artistic career in the 1980s, homosexuality was not openly discussed in Israel, and there was little Israeli art and literature that dealt with homoeroticism. His most known series is called Soldiers, that contains 22 staged photos of young male Israeli soldiers, never depicted in combat. The best-known photo of the series is The Last Supper that reflects the idea that death is ever-present in Israeli society, not only in combat but also in daily life. By portraying the soldiers as both Jesus and Judas Iscariot, Nes sought to emphasize the vulnerability and fragility of their lives. The photograph hints at the possibility that this meal could be the last for any of the soldiers. The photo was sold for $264,000 (equivalent to $370,000 in 2025) at Sotheby’s in 2012, a higher price than had ever been paid for any Israeli photo. The original print is now in Jerusalem at the Israel Museum.

== Symbolism and interpretation ==
In The Last Supper, the soldiers are portrayed as "disciples of an ideology", the same as Jesus's apostles, subject to forces beyond their control. The bullet holes in the wall, cigarette smoke, and bitten apple symbolize the transience of life, reinforcing the idea that this could be their last meal together.

Noa Roei writes that Nes "brings the disciples back home, to the land of Israel, and plays with the fact that they too were once Jewish soldiers of sorts. His contemporary Israeli soldier is endowed with the doomed as well as redeeming faith of Jesus at the same time that Christian canonical history is understood anew in relation to national and military alliances."

The photo has been noted for its "homoerotic challenge to Israeli machismo and its reference to the Christian message of looming betrayal and death".

Carrie Bettel writes that "Nes parallels the experience of Jesus and his disciples with that of the soldier and his unit. As the soldiers eat, they are aware that this theoretically could be their final meal together." The difference of Jesus and the central figure on the photo is also noted:

the soldier representing Jesus is not the focus of attention and none of his fellow soldiers look at him [compared to Leonardo]: while he is the formal centre of the picture, he is not the focus of its narrative [...] there is no gesture inviting us to participate in the scene... Jesus left alone, Jesus noticed by no one, is a soldier predestined to die who [...] is already becoming eradicated from the memory of the people surrounding him... [...] the role of the central figure implies the difficulties of becoming a soldier and going to war. The soldiers must separate themselves from their reality (as demonstrated by the use of third person) in order to survive – if they survive. Since the soldier is 'predestined to die', the soldier chooses to disconnect himself from reality instead of accepting his fate.

== See also ==
- Dublin's Last Supper
