= Italian Quarter, Dublin =

Area of Dublin, Ireland

The Italian Quarter An Ceathrú Iodálach
- Area of Dublin
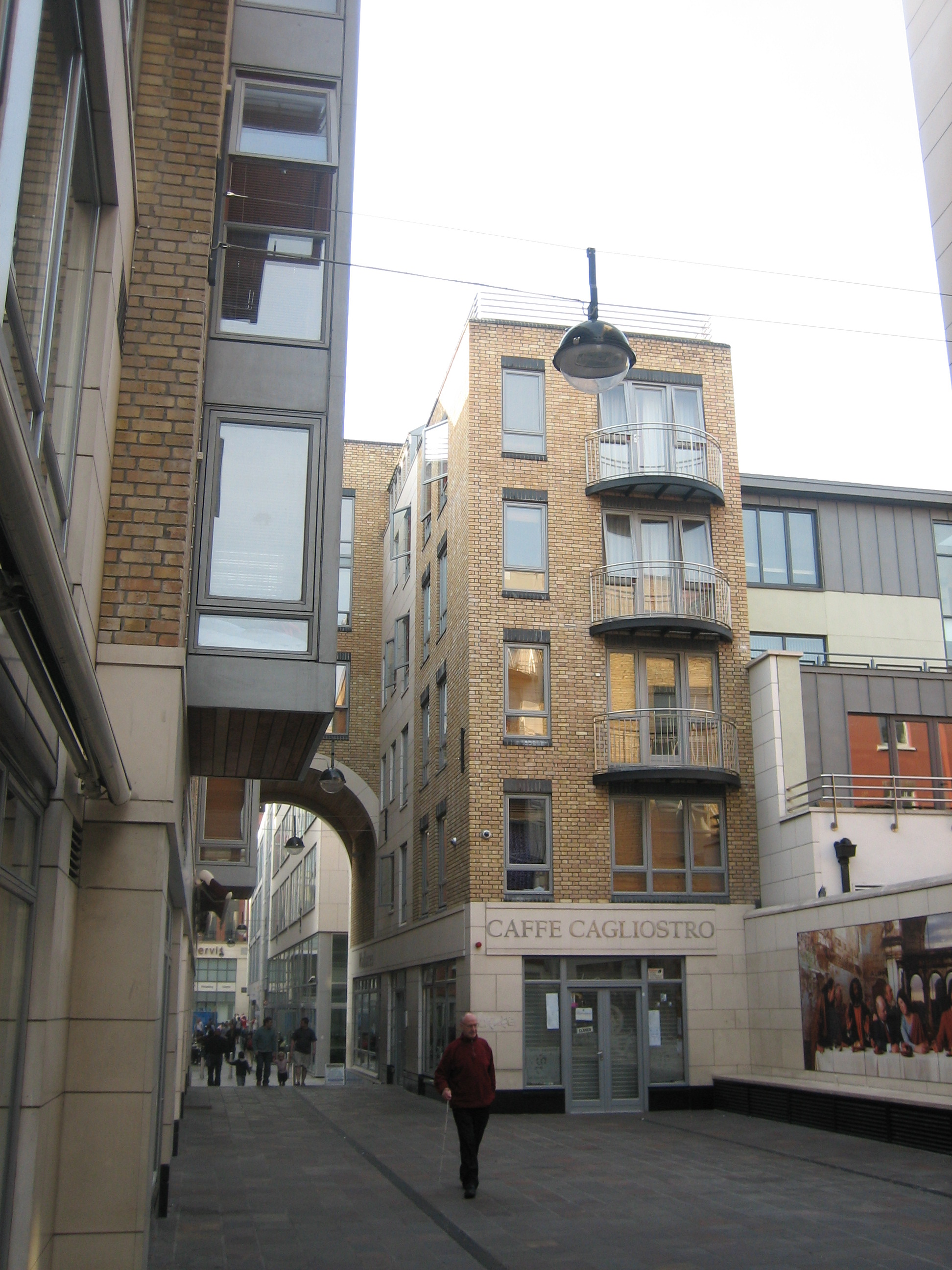
- Bloom Lane and the Italian Quarter courtyard in 2006

- Location in Dublin The Italian Quarter (Dublin)
- Coordinates: 53°20′48″N 6°15′55″W
- Country: Ireland
- City: Dublin
- Postal district: D01

The Italian Quarter (Irish: An Ceathrú Iodálach) is an unofficially-named private development on the north bank of the River Liffey in central Dublin, Ireland. (Note: Not to be confused with Dublin's historic 'Little Italy', which in the late 1800s and early 1900s was located in the area around Chancery Lane, Ship Street Little, and Werburgh Street.) (Note: The name 'The Italian Quarter' is unofficial and unrecognised, and does not appear in the official eircode addresses for premises located along Bloom Lane: STUSO 3 Bloom Lane Ormond Quay Lower Dublin 1 D01 V127 It is however sometimes quoted in newspapers when referring to the addresses of restaurants along the lane. As of August 2023, the name 'The Italian Quarter' is also unrecognised by Ireland's placenames database.) The development comprises Bloom Lane, a pedestrianised alley, and the properties located along both sides of it, including an apartment complex known as Quartiere Bloom. In 2019, Italy Magazine named the area as one of the places to find "one of the more convincing approximations of mangiare all'italiana" in Dublin.

With "European-style" dining establishments and cafes, the Italian Quarter is one of several mixed-use quarters that have appeared in Dublin since the 1990s, promoted by the Dublin City Council and private developers.

== Background ==
Originally developed by MEP Mick Wallace as part of an urban regeneration project on what was considered the 'decaying northern quays', the 'Italian Quarter' opened in 2004. His former building company M&J Wallace was the main developer. Designed by architect George Morris, the development retained the facade of an older building on the quays. The frontage was cut through to create a pedestrian access route extending from the Millennium Bridge through the Italian Quarter to a zebra crossing, leading to the rest of the Millennium Walkway and the Jervis stop on the Luas Red Line.

Wallace, an Italophile who once owned property in Turin and a vineyard in Piedmont, declared bankruptcy in 2016. In February 2023, the Irish Independent reported that the holding company Wallace Calcio, which he exited but continued to advise, was associated with 10 businesses including wine bars, restaurants, and cafes near the Italian Quarter.

Italian eateries in the quarter include Caffe Cagliostro, located alongside the iconic photo mural Dublin's Last Supper; Wallace's Taverna, a restaurant and pizzeria that first opened in 2005; Sfuso, formerly known as Enoteca Delle Langhe, a gastronomia or deli and wine bar serving aperitivo; and Bar Italia, whose pasta dishes often appear on social media. Out of these, Bar Italia was never part of Wallace Calcio. Continuing north across Great Strand Street, the Millennium Walkway is home to a Thai restaurant, a burrito shop, and other establishments, including a hookah bar. These are however not strictly part of the Italian Quarter which centers on Bloom's Lane and its courtyard.

== Dublin's Last Supper ==
A large-scale photographic artwork by Irish artist John Byrne entitled Dublin's Last Supper was installed in 2004 covering the side of a wall within the courtyard in the Italian Quarter. Depicting a modern-day re-enactment of Leonardo da Vinci's The Last Supper, Byrne added an 'Irish twist' by replacing the Biblical characters with a cast of local Dubliners that reflected the "changing society and the growing cultural mix in Dublin" at the time.

Although it stirred some controversy when it was first unveiled, over the years, Dublin's Last Supper has become one of the more popular public artworks located across Dublin.

== Gallery ==
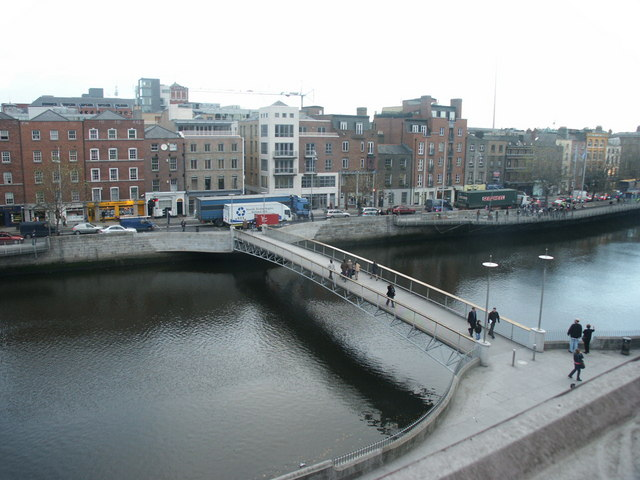
Looking northwards across the Millennium Bridge towards the Italian Quarter

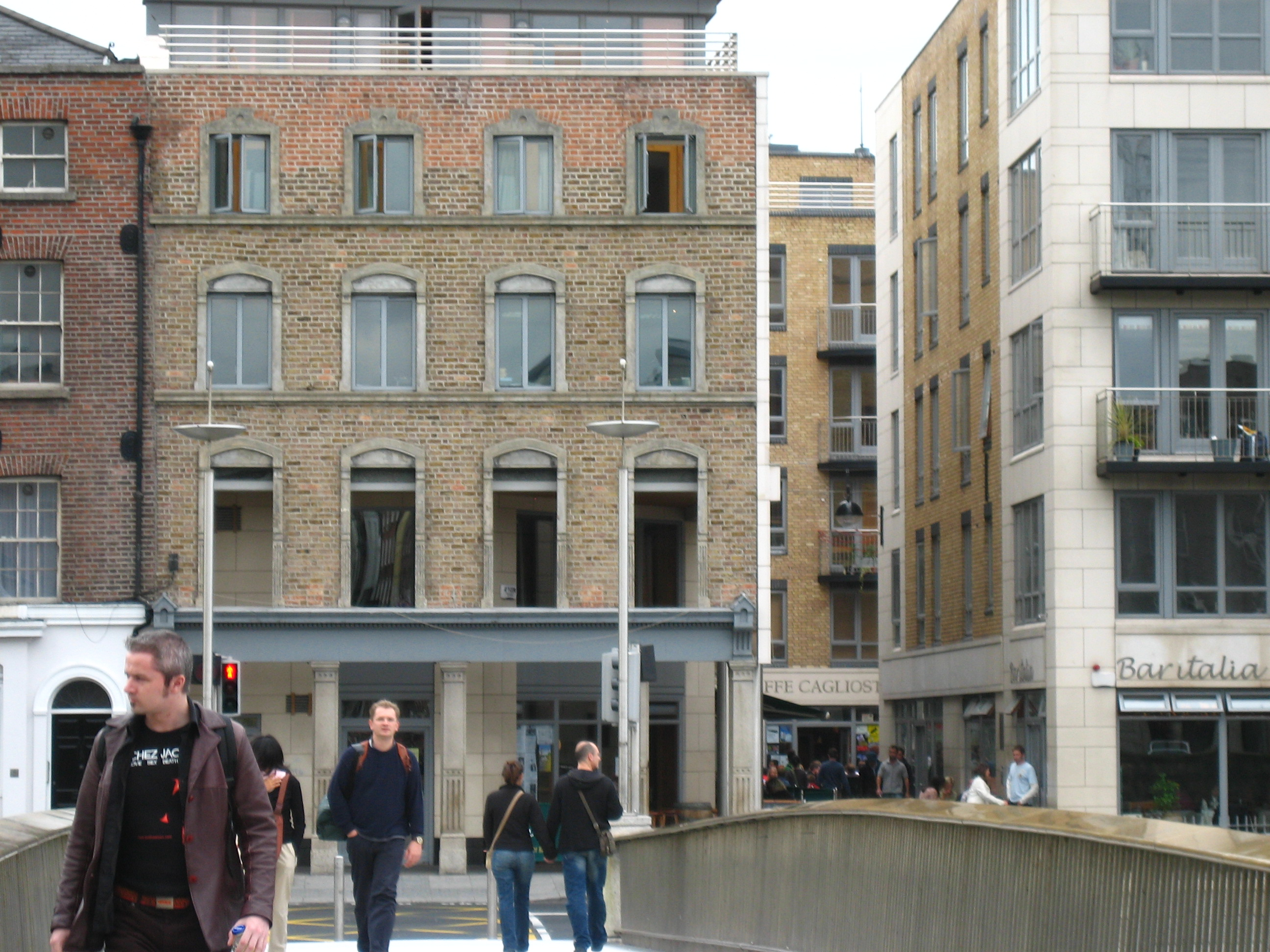
View of Italian Quarter from Millennium Bridge (2006)

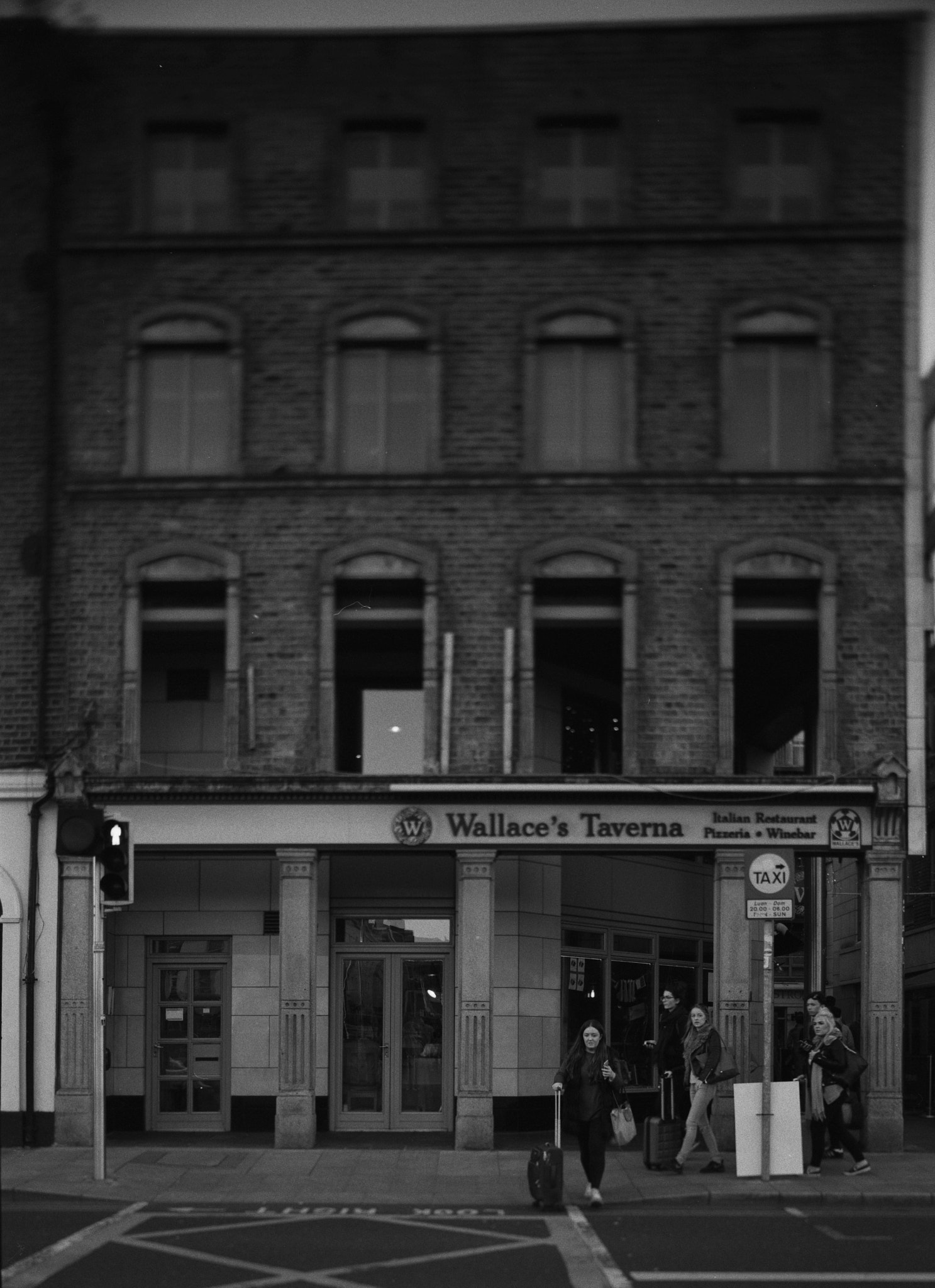
Wallace's Taverna on the corner of Ormond Quay Lower and Bloom Lane (2016)

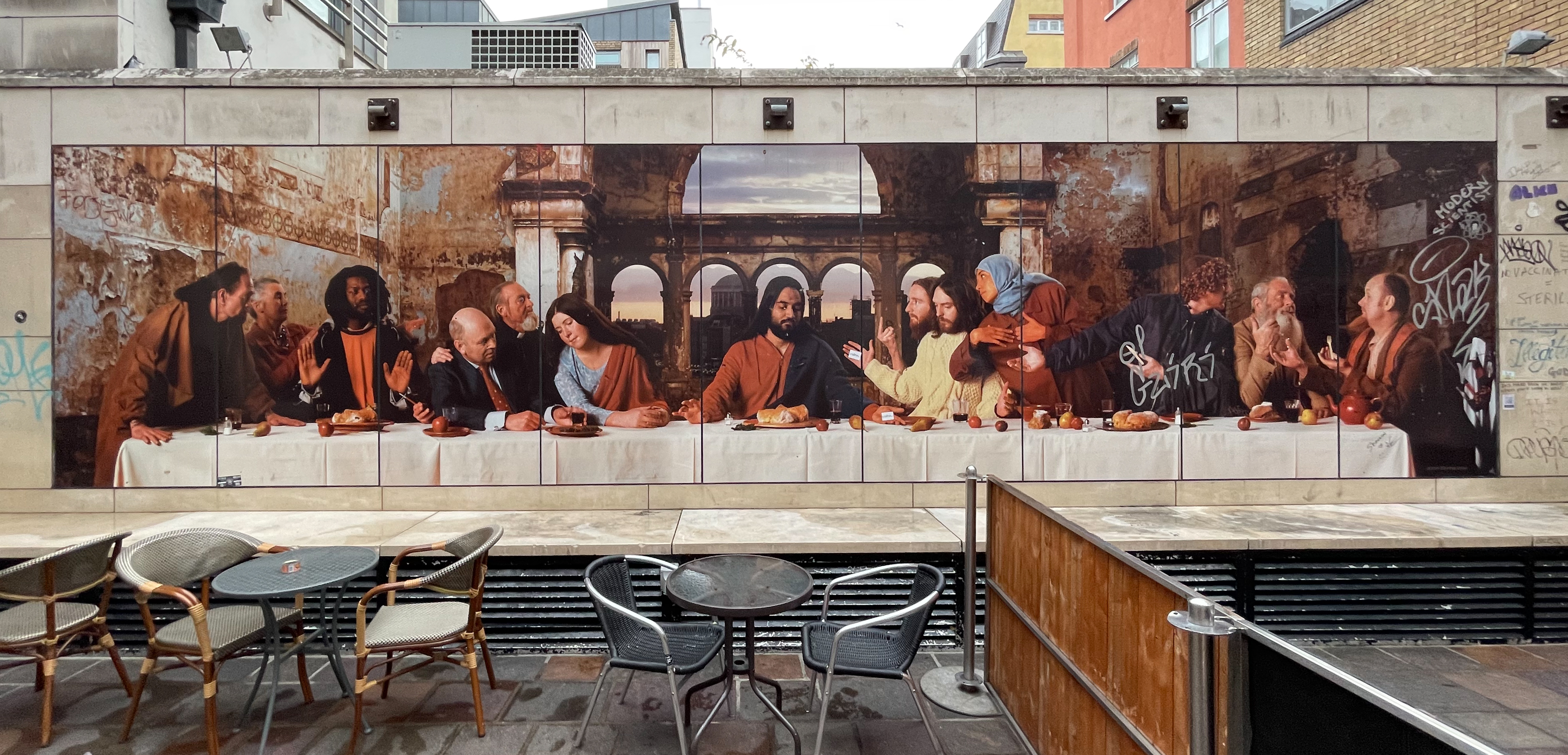
Dublin's Last Supper as seen in 2021
