= Millennium Bridge (Dublin) =

Bridge over the River Liffey in Ireland

Millennium Bridge Droichead na Mílaoise
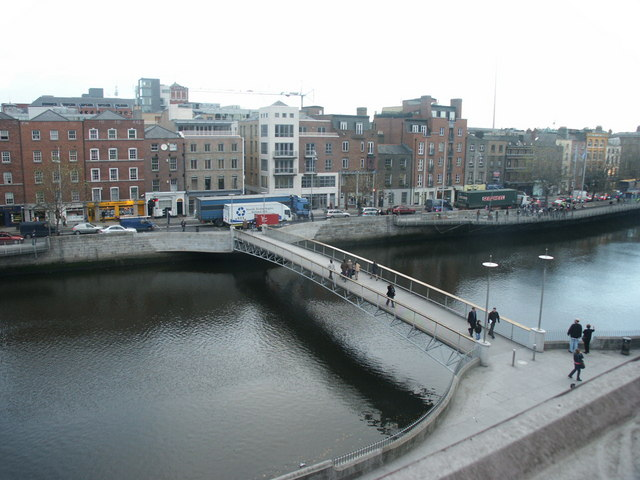
- Coordinates: 53.346°N 6.265°W
- Carries: Pedestrians
- Crosses: River Liffey
- Locale: Dublin, Ireland
- Preceded by: Grattan Bridge
- Followed by: Ha'penny Bridge

Characteristics
- Material: Steel and concrete
- Total length: 51 m (41 m span)
- Width: ~4m
- No. of spans: 1

History
- Designer: Howley Harrington (architects), Price & Myers (engineers)
- Constructed by: Ascon (contractor), Thompson Engineering (steel structure), Banagher Concrete (abutments)
- Opened: 1999

Location
- Interactive map of Millennium Bridge

The Millennium Bridge (Irish: Droichead na Mílaoise) is a pedestrian bridge spanning the River Liffey in Dublin, Ireland, joining Eustace Street in Temple Bar to the north quays.

The bridge was installed in December 1999 to commemorate the approaching new millennium in 2000. It was prefabricated in Carlow, 80 km from Dublin, as a portal frame structure made up of a slender steel truss and resting on reinforced concrete haunches.

The bridge was designed by Howley Harrington Architects, with Price & Myers as consulting engineers. The concrete base and steel structure for the bridge were provided by two firms from Carlow: Formwork 2000+ and Thompson Engineering respectively.

The Millennium Bridge is a neighbour to the much older pedestrian Ha'penny Bridge to the east, and Grattan Bridge to the west. Bloom Lane is to the north.

Writing on the opening of the James Joyce Bridge in 2003, Irish Times environment editor Frank McDonald was critical of the alignment of the Millennium Bridge, writing:

Bridges are all about making connections. New circulation patterns develop around them, so they must be seen – and planned for – in that context. Sometimes mistakes are made, as in the case of the Millennium footbridge, which would have fed life into Meeting House Square had it been properly aligned.

== See also ==
- Dublin Millennium, the 1,000 year anniversary of Dublin's founding, which took place in 1988
