= Dublin's Last Supper =

2004 photographic mural by John Byrne

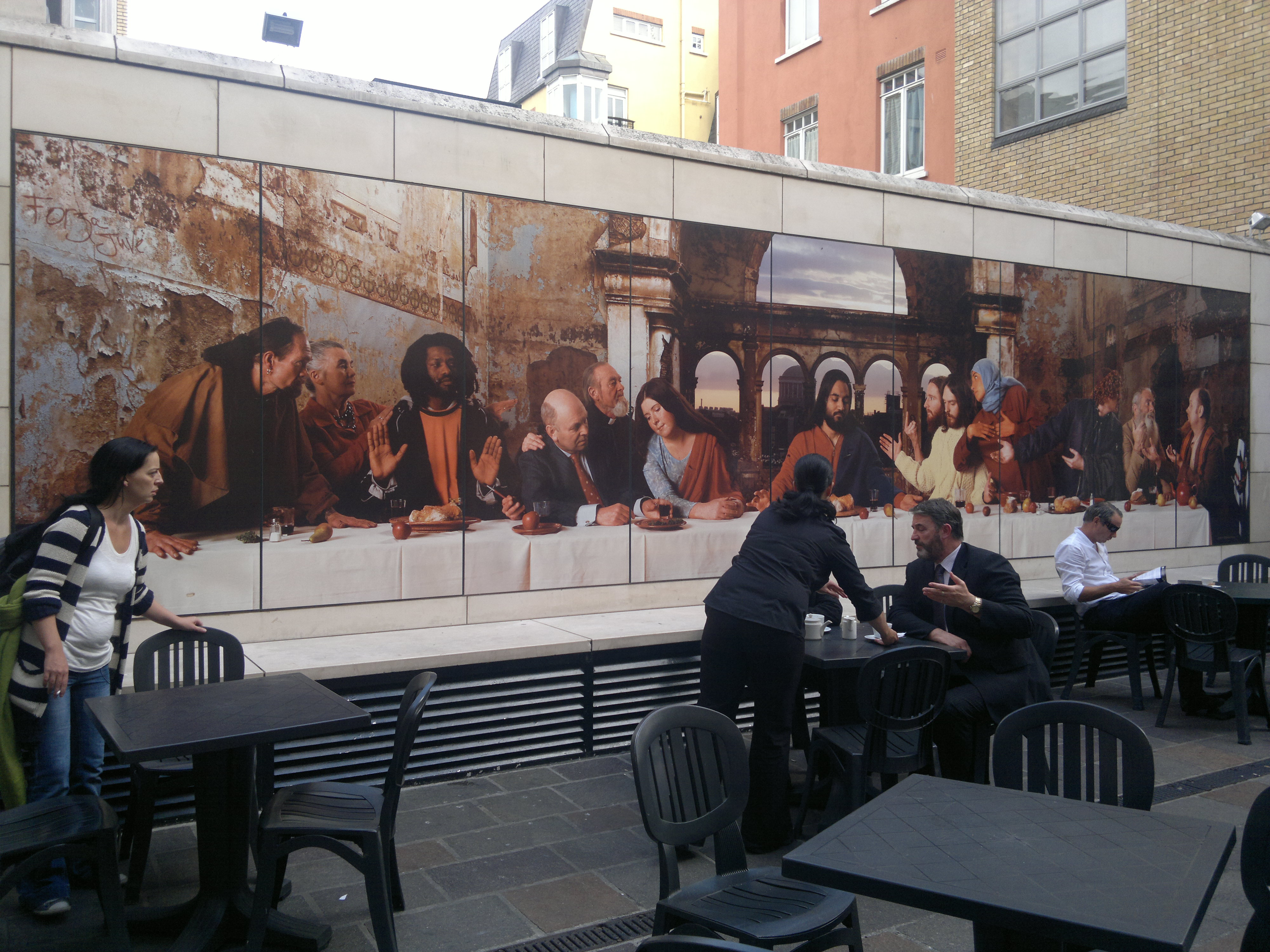
- Dublin's Last Supper in 2011
- Artist: John Byrne
- Year: 2004
- Medium: Vitreous enamel on steel
- Dimensions: 220 cm × 930 cm (87 in × 366 in)
- Location: Bloom Lane, Dublin
- 53°20′48″N 6°15′54″W

Dublin's Last Supper is a photographic mural by Irish artist John Byrne that was installed in Dublin's Italian Quarter in 2004. The work features contemporary Dubliners as Jesus and the Twelve Apostles, reenacting The Last Supper by Leonardo da Vinci. Measuring 220 by 930 centimetres (87 by 366 in), Dublin's Last Supper is printed on vitreous enamel covering nine steel panels installed along Bloom Lane, part of the Millennium Walkway.

== Background ==
In 2003, Byrne was approached by curator Clíodhna Shaffrey to submit a proposal for the project, which was commissioned by developer Mick Wallace of M&J Wallace, as a centrepiece for the Italian Quarter in Dublin.

In February 2004, Byrne started recruiting local models on the streets of Dublin, based on their resemblance to the figures in Leonardo's work. He approached a total of 150 potential candidates, who were narrowed down to 13 following rehearsals and screen tests. The models were Dubliners from a wide range of social, ethnic, and religious backgrounds, and included three women. Jesus was portrayed by Kulpreet Singh, an Indian Sikh PhD student at Trinity College Dublin. The apostles were portrayed by Dubliners from a variety of professions, including a tattoo artist, a librarian, an actor, a travel centre employee, an ecologist, a building worker, a network analyst, and various other students.

The models' costumes were created by Irish vintage fashion designer Jean Cronin. In July 2004, the 13 models were photographed in the Church of St Michael and St John at Temple Bar, in seven separate groups of one to three people at a time. The photographs were scanned in high resolution and sent to Belgium, where they were transposed onto nine panels of vitreous enamel. Byrne oversaw the installation in Dublin later that month.

== Description ==
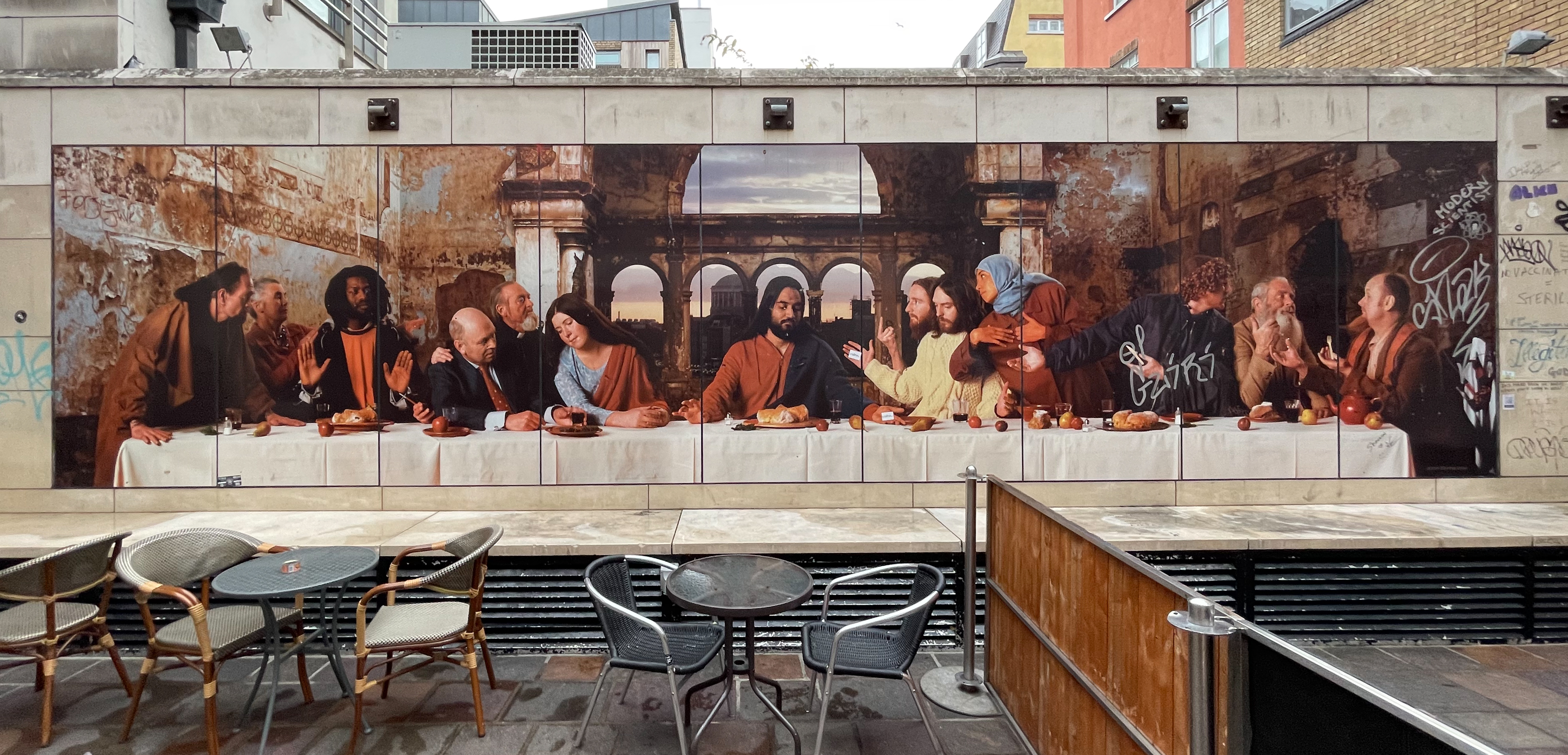
Dublin's Last Supper, photographed in 2021

The Twelve Apostles dining with Jesus are dressed in contemporary clothing in a medieval style, evoking Leonardo's original work. The exception is Judas, who is dressed in a business suit and appears to be a banker or businessman. The table itself is laid with Irish soda bread and a red teapot, in addition to wine and fruit. Other elements include a Juventus jersey draped over a chair in the corner, which is an homage to Mick Wallace, an Italophile and avid football fan. The background is a cross-section of the ruined St Luke's Church on the Coombe in Dublin, with the dome of the Four Courts in the distance.

== Reception ==
Dublin's Last Supper has been called "witty" and "irreverent". Although the work has been regarded by some as "blasphemous", according to journalist Frank McNally, "The Last Supper has survived to become one of the city's better-loved public works of art."

Artist Catherine Marshall wrote in The Irish Times that Dublin's Last Supper "subtly suggests that the Renaissance has finally come to Ireland in the form of cafe culture, while at the same time pointing to growing pluralism in Ireland, and the new religion of consumerism."

In 2008, an article in The Irish Times observed that the mural had remained "miraculously unvandalised, except for the occasional graffiti".

== See also ==
- List of public art in Dublin
- The Last Supper (photograph)
