= Irish mammy =

Stereotype of Irish womanhood

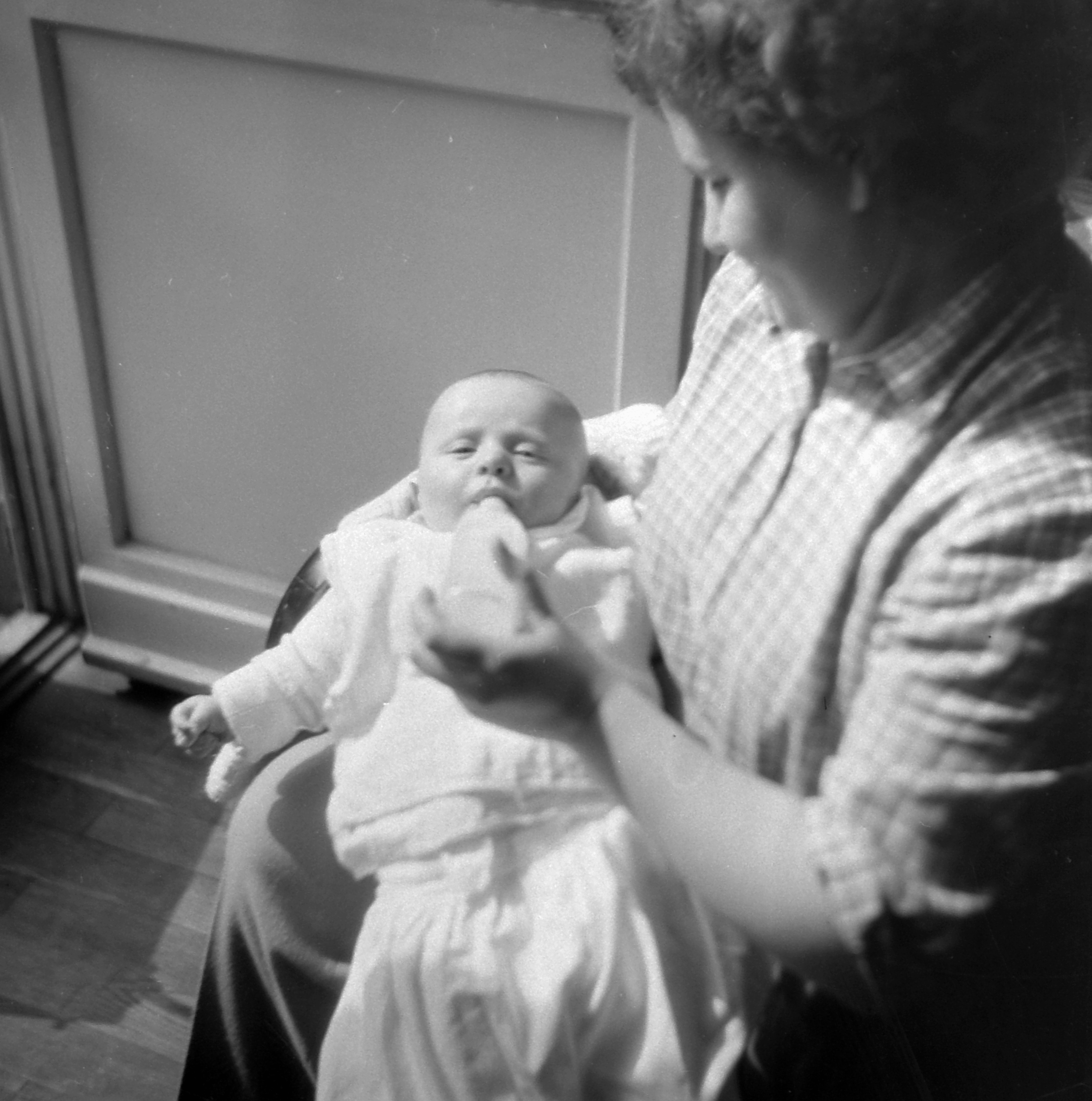
The Irish mammy can be a protective and loving figure, but also strong-willed and authoritative when required

The Irish mammy is a cultural stereotype used in Ireland to describe Irish mothers of a traditionally matriarchal style, who exhibit traits of over-protection or servitude towards their children and/or domestic visitors in general, but can also be exacting when needed.

In 2017, The Irish Times wrote of the Irish mammy as a "magnificent and treasured institution."

== Description ==
Diane Negra, professor of Film Studies and Screen Culture at University College Dublin, hypothesised on the occurrence of the trope in Irish culture as of 2017:

Obviously there are different societies that have that particular fixation on the mother as a keeper of the hearth, and Ireland is not unique in that regard. The trope has a certain energy right now, and has deep roots in the idea of Mother Ireland, and of nationalising Ireland in female form, as a figure of domestic peace. It's no coincidence that her pop culture visibility goes up with the collapse of the Celtic Tiger. The sense of shock and trauma reverberated through society as the economy collapsed. At the same time, the recession was seen as a unique injury to men and male wage earners, hence the term "mancession".

In 2024, the American theological journal First Things described the concept of the Irish mammy as:

"A figure of frugality, but also of bounteousness; of judgmentalism, but also of forgiveness; of care, common sense, inherited prejudices, and needless fussing. She inspires pride, affection, fear, and hilarity, all brought to an almost overbearing pitch, and is thought to be found only in Ireland. The Irish Mammy is the ultimate national treasure, replicated all over the island in home after home and wherever else the Irish are to be found in numbers."

== Reactions ==
Clare O'Dea, writing for The Irish Independent in 2019, opined that the Irish mammy "caricature of a simple-minded, ageing biddy in dowdy clothes" was disrespectful to all that Irish mothers had achieved in the past 50 years in areas such as contraception, family law and abortion. O'Dea pointed out that it was "revealing that there is no equivalent stereotype for the Irish Daddy being mined for amusement these days. Irish literature has a long tradition of unsympathetic fathers, from John McGahern's tyrannical patriarchs to Frank McCourt's "shiftless, loquacious alcoholic father" who drives the family to ruin."

Ciara Geraghty, also writing for The Irish Independent, but in 2012, argued that the Irish mammy had modernised: "She got the vote. She burned her bra. She put herself on the Pill. She got a job. She threw away the charred remains of her burned bra and invested in a swanky underwire bra."

== Notable examples ==
=== Fictional ===
- Bridget (played by Jennifer Zamparelli), in the sitcom Bridget & Eamon (2016)
- Agnes Loretta Brown (played by Brendan O'Carroll), in the sitcom Mrs. Brown's Boys (2011–present)
- Bridget Fagan Brown (played by Brenda Fricker), in My Left Foot (1989)
- Biddy Byrne (played by Mary McEvoy), in the Irish soap opera Glenroe (1983–2001)
- Kay Curley (played by Ruth McCabe), in The Snapper (1993)
- Rita Doyle (played by Jean Costello), in the Irish soap opera Fair City (1989–2013)
- Anne Flanagan (played by Sean 'Hog' Flanagan), of the Irish comedy sketch group Foil Arms and Hog (2008–present)
- Mary Riordan (played by Moira Deady), in the television series The Riordans (1965–1979)
- Carmel Walsh (played by Philippa Dunne), in the sitcom The Walshes (2014)

=== Real life ===
- Miriam O'Callaghan, Irish television presenter with RTÉ
- Peig Sayers (1873–1958), Irish author and seanchaí

== See also ==
- Culture of Ireland
- Feminism in the Republic of Ireland
- Irish Housewives Association
- Mammy stereotype, a U.S. historical stereotype depicting Black women, usually enslaved, who did domestic work, among nursing children
- Colm O'Regan, Irish comedian, who has written books on the theme of the Irish mammy
