= Moira Deady =

Irish actress

- Born: 13 March 1922; County Cork, Ireland
- Died: 15 November 2010 (aged 88); Loughlinstown Hospital, County Dublin, Ireland
- Occupation: Actress
- Notable work: The Riordans; Glenroe
- Spouse(s): Johnny Hoey (19??–10 August 1978; his death); 4 children

Moira Deady, Mrs Hoey (13 March 1922 – 15 November 2010) was an Irish actress.

== Life and career ==
She starred as Mary Riordan, "the quintessential Irish mammy", in The Riordans from 1965 until the show was cancelled in 1979. She later appeared as Nellie Connors in Glenroe. She played Mrs Coffey in The Irish R.M. She had roles in such films as This Is My Father and Angela's Ashes (as the grandmother.

Raised in Cork City, County Cork, she later resided in Greystones, County Wicklow. She began acting by traveling around Ireland as part of fit-ups (traveling theatre troupes).

She was a member of Equity Players in 1946, who toured a programme of Abbey Theatre and other famous plays.

In 2009, she reunited with the cast members of the rural drama The Riordans for an RTÉ documentary on the programme. She was one of a small number of Riordans actors to work on both its successor series Bracken and Glenroe.

== Marriage and children ==
In 1954, she married fellow The Riordans actor John "Johnny" Hoey (who played "Francie Maher"). John Hoey died on 10 August 1978, aged 69. The couple had four children, Kevin, Mary, Bernadette, and Brenda. Fans often thought she was married in real life to actor John Cowley who played "Tom Riordan", her television husband.

== Death ==
She died, aged 88, on 15 November 2010 in Loughlinstown Hospital, County Dublin. Minister for Tourism, Culture and Sport Mary Hanafin commented on her part in Irish history: "In her role as the matriarch of The Riordans homestead, she was ever present, each Sunday, on our television screens dealing with the changing landscape and domestic issues that Ireland as a country was experiencing".

John Boland, writing in the Irish Independent, called her "everyone's mammy and the conscience of a nation" while reflecting that her death meant all the senior cast members of The Riordans were now deceased.

Hundreds attended her funeral on 18 November at Holy Rosary Church, Greystones.

== Roles ==
=== Film ===
- The Nephew (1998) as Birdie
- This Is My Father (1998) as Mrs. Kearney
- Angela's Ashes (1999) as Mrs. Purcell
- Headrush (2003) as Mrs. Macroom
- The Tiger's Tail (2006) as Maeve, Liam's mother (final film role)

=== Television ===
- The Riordans (1972-1979) as Mary Riordan
- Bracken (1981)
- The Irish R.M. (1984) as Mrs. Coffey
- Glenroe (1997) as Nellie Connors
- Legend (2006) as Mrs. Gallagher

=== Theatre ===
- Wild Goose - Hannah Power
