= Robert Carrickford =

Irish actor (1928–2016)

- Born: 4 January 1928; Ballyshannon, Ireland
- Died: 15 March 2016 (aged 88); Dublin
- Occupations: Actor, Producer, Director, President of Irish Actors Equity
- Notable work: Glenroe,
- Television: Glenroe, The Riordans, The Ballroom of Romance
- Movement: Irish Actors Equity
- Spouse: Mary Golding

Robert Carrickford (4 January 1928 – 15 March 2016) was an Irish actor, producer, and director. His father, Nicholas Carrickford, was an actor and theatre manager, and Carrickford spent much of his early life touring Ireland with the family company, part of the tradition of travelling repertory theatre known in Ireland as “fit-ups”. Owing to the demands of touring, his formal education was limited.

Following his father’s illness, Carrickford assumed responsibility for the family company in his teens. After its closure in the late 1950s, he founded the Dublin Comedy Theatre, producing revues and stage adaptations, including works based on stories by Oscar Wilde. He later toured internationally with Irish plays such as The Playboy of the Western World and Juno and the Paycock, including the United States and Hong Kong.

Carrickford also performed at the Abbey Theatre between 1969 and 1980. and worked with several Irish theatre companies. In addition to acting, he directed and produced stage productions throughout his career.

He played Stephen Brennan, a well-off farmer, in the long-running Irish television series Glenroe. Carrickford was president of Irish Actors Equity during the 1980s and 1990s lobbying for better pay and conditions for Irish actors.

He died in 2016 at the age of 88 in Dublin.

== Filmography ==
Part	Production	Year
Fogarty	The Ballroom of Romance	1982
McCaffery	The Irish RM	1983
Dr Neary	The Key	1983
Under-Secretary Marsden	Anne Devlin	1984
Skipper Liam Costello	The Ted Kennedy Jr. Story	1986
Alan Hart	Taffin	1988
Stephen Brennan	Glenroe	1983 - 2001

=== Actor ===
Year	Title	Role	Notes
1970	Quackser Fortune Has a Cousin in the Bronx	Walter	Uncredited
1976	The Pink Panther Strikes Again	First Police Escort on Train	Uncredited
1979	The Outsider		
1984	Anne Devlin	Under-Secretary Marsden	
1986	The Ballroom of Romance	Fogarty	
1988	Taffin	Alan Hart	
