= Joe Pilkington =

Irish actor (1940–1999)

- Born: 1940; Galway, Ireland
- Died: 7 July 1999; Galway, Ireland
- Occupation: Actor
- Years active: 1970–1999

Joe Pilkington (1940 – 7 July 1999) was an Irish actor, best known for his portrayal of Eamon Maher in the long-running TV series The Riordans. Father of actress Rachel Pilkington, Joseph Pilkington made a marked contribution to Irish arts and culture through roles played both on and offscreen. His acting roles in the late 1960s in the Abbey Theatre are listed.

== Filmography ==
=== Film ===
- Underground (1970) as Enlisted Man
- The McKenzie Break (1970) as Police Communications Sergeant (uncredited)
- The Outsider (1979)
- Light Years Away (1981) as Thomas
- Traveller (1981) as Traveller man
- The Ballroom of Romance (1986) as Tim Daly
- Into The West (1992) as Detective
- A Man of no Importance (1994) as Ernie Lally
- The Butcher Boy (1998) as Charlie McGlone

=== Television ===
- The Riordans (1972–1979) as Eamon Maher
- The Hanging Gale (1995) as James Phelan
