= Ann Rowan =

Irish actress

- Born: 1928 or 1929; Ireland
- Died: 10 August 2014 (aged 85); Ireland
- Occupation: Actress

Ann Rowan (1928/1929 - 10 August 2014) was an Irish actress. She was best known for her role as Julia Mac in the RTÉ television soap opera The Riordans. She also had roles in the television series Father Ted and Screen Two. She made appearances in the movies Ulysses (1967) and The Outsider (1980).

Rowan died on 10 August 2014 after a short illness. She is not to be confused with international author, Ann Rowan, who wrote Rapture Revelation published September 2014.

== Filmography ==
Year	Title	Role	Notes
1967	Ulysses	Mrs. Bellingham	
1968	The Wild Duck	Mrs. Soerby	TV movie
1979	The Riordans	Julie Mac	
1979	The Outsider		
1983	The Irish R.M.	Mrs. Moloney	Episode: "Occasional Licences"
1993	Fatal Inheritance	Mrs. Hughs	
1995	Father Ted	Mrs. Glynn / Mrs. Sheridan	2 episodes
