= Rachel Pilkington =

Irish actress (born 1974)

- Born: Rachel Carson Pilkington; 28 November 1974 (age 51); County Tipperary, Ireland
- Occupation: Actress
- Years active: 1997–

Rachel Carson Pilkington (born 28 November 1974) is an Irish actress.

== Career ==
Pilkington appeared in “Bloom”, a 2003 film adaptation of James Joyce’s “Ulysses”, as the crippled girl on the beach. In 2004, Pilkington received an IFTA nomination in the Best Actress in a Supporting Role – Film/TV category for her role in The Clinic. She has been playing the role of Jane Black in RTÉ soap opera Fair City since 2013.

== Personal life ==
She is the daughter of the actor Joe Pilkington who played Eamonn Maher in the television serial, The Riordans. She is divorced and has a child. Pilkington follows a vegan diet.

== Filmography ==
Television
Year	Title	Role
1997–2000	Glenroe	Jennifer Crosby
1998	Mystic Knights of Tir Na Nog	Village Mother
1999	Trí Scéal	Young Eileen
2003–2009	The Clinic	Keelin Geraghty Donaghue
2012	Keys to the City	Denise
2013	Scúp	Bríd
2013–2023	Fair City	Jane Black
