= How to Cheat in the Leaving Certificate =

1997 film by Graham Jones

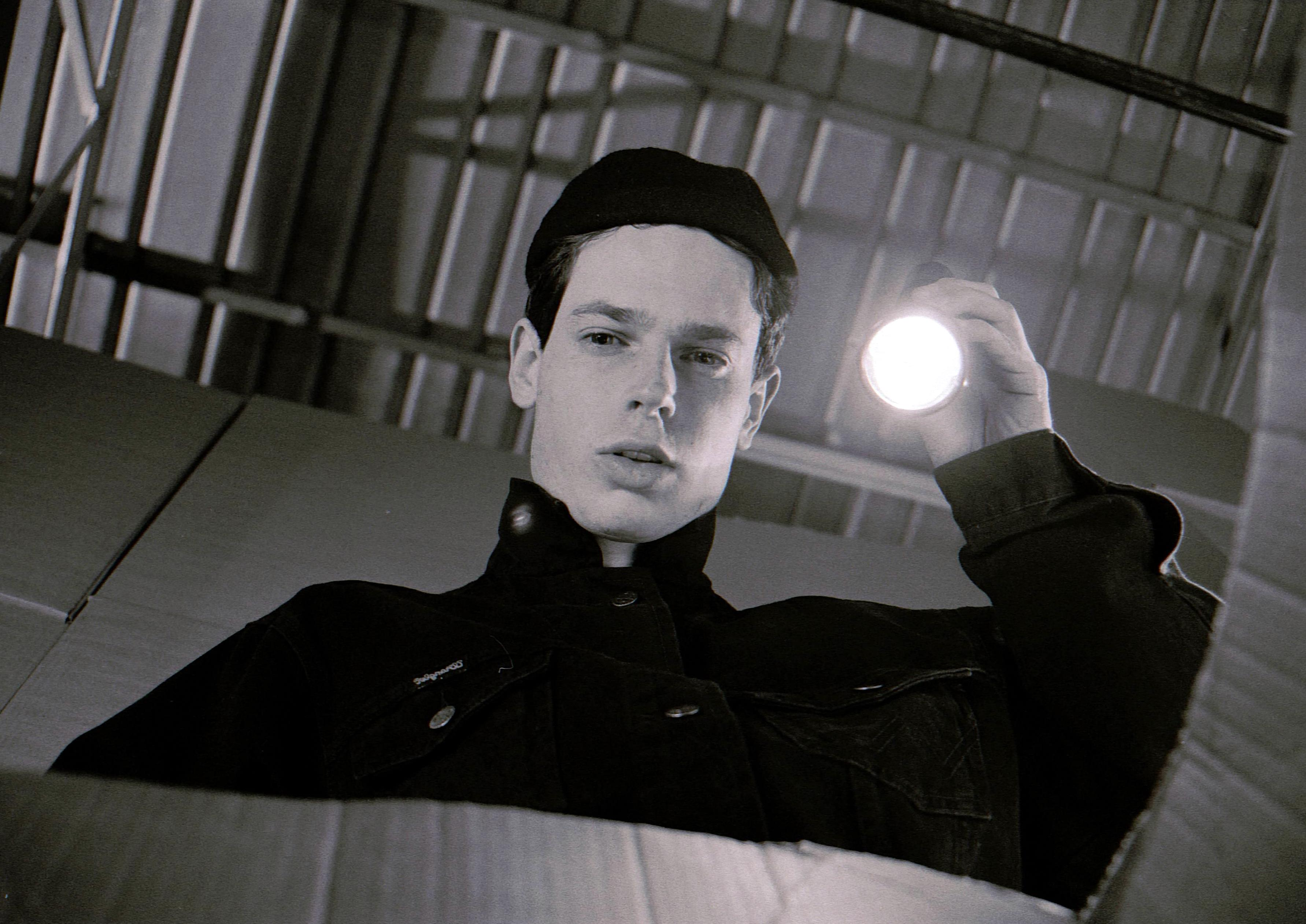
- Garret Baker in How to Cheat in the Leaving Certificate
- Directed by: Graham Jones
- Written by: Aislinn O'Loughlin; Graham Jones; Tadhg O'Higgins
- Produced by: Ciara Flanagan; Graham Jones
- Starring: Joe McKinney; Eamon Morissey; Aileen O'Connor; Garret Baker; Lee Dunne; Mary McEvoy; Alison Coffey
- Cinematography: Robbie Ryan
- Music by: Giles Packham
- Production company: Graham Jones Productions
- Release date: 10 July 1997 (Ireland)
- Running time: 80 minutes
- Country: Ireland

How to Cheat in the Leaving Certificate is a 1997 independent Irish film directed by Graham Jones, in which six teenagers devise a plan to cheat in their Leaving Certificate final school examinations. The film was shot in black and white on Super 16mm and was later blown up to 35mm for theatrical distribution. Many well known Irish faces made cameo appearances in the film.

== Plot ==
Upon being caught cheating in his Leaving Certificate exam and being banned from sitting the exam for another three years, a young man commits suicide. A close friend of his subsequently plots to cheat in his own Leaving Certificate in order to get revenge against the system. With the help of a rag-tag group of friends this young man organizes a complex scheme to steal copies of the test papers from the Department of Education and, upon winning, show the world he has beaten the system.

== Cast ==
- Eamon Morrissey as Mr. Fornson
- Aileen O'Connor as Cara
- Garret Baker as Fionn
- Lee Dunne as Brian Donnelly
- Joe McKinney as Niall
- Mary McEvoy as Charlie McDaid
- Philip Bredin as Murphy
- Alison Coffey as Elli
- Chris de Burgh as petrol pumper (cameo)
- Corban Walker as a signmaker

== Production ==
The Irish Film Board helped fund the film, contributing £90,000 to its production. The film was shot in a six-week period.

== Critical reception ==
Writing for Variety, critic Emanuel Levy praised the film's "droll humor that is occasionally laced with irony", as well as Jones's "technical panache." He added, "Once the premise has been set and central characters established, the film becomes less funny and more suspenseful regarding the final outcome of the scandalous act. Compensating for the plot’s narrow focus are the helmer’s bold visual style and the intermittently witty voiceover narration." An Phoblacht called the film "an irreverent and rebellious diatribe against the Irish education system."

== Controversy ==
A few weeks before the film went on general release in Ireland, the Junior Minister for Education, Willie O'Dea, condemned the film, leading to widespread coverage in newspapers, television, and radio. Anxiety was partly due to the timing of the film's release, which occurred a few months before the annual summer exams. Other projects by Graham Jones, such as Fudge 44, have also caused controversy.

== Music ==
"I Hear You Breathing In", from Eleanor McEvoy's debut album, Eleanor McEvoy, and "Parachute" by Something Happens are two of the tracks featured in the film.
