= If the Cap Fits =

If the Cap Fits may refer to:

- If the Cap Fits (TV series), 1973 Irish TV series
- If the Cap Fits..., 6th episode of the 5th series of sitcom, Dad's Army
