= Nola and the Clones =

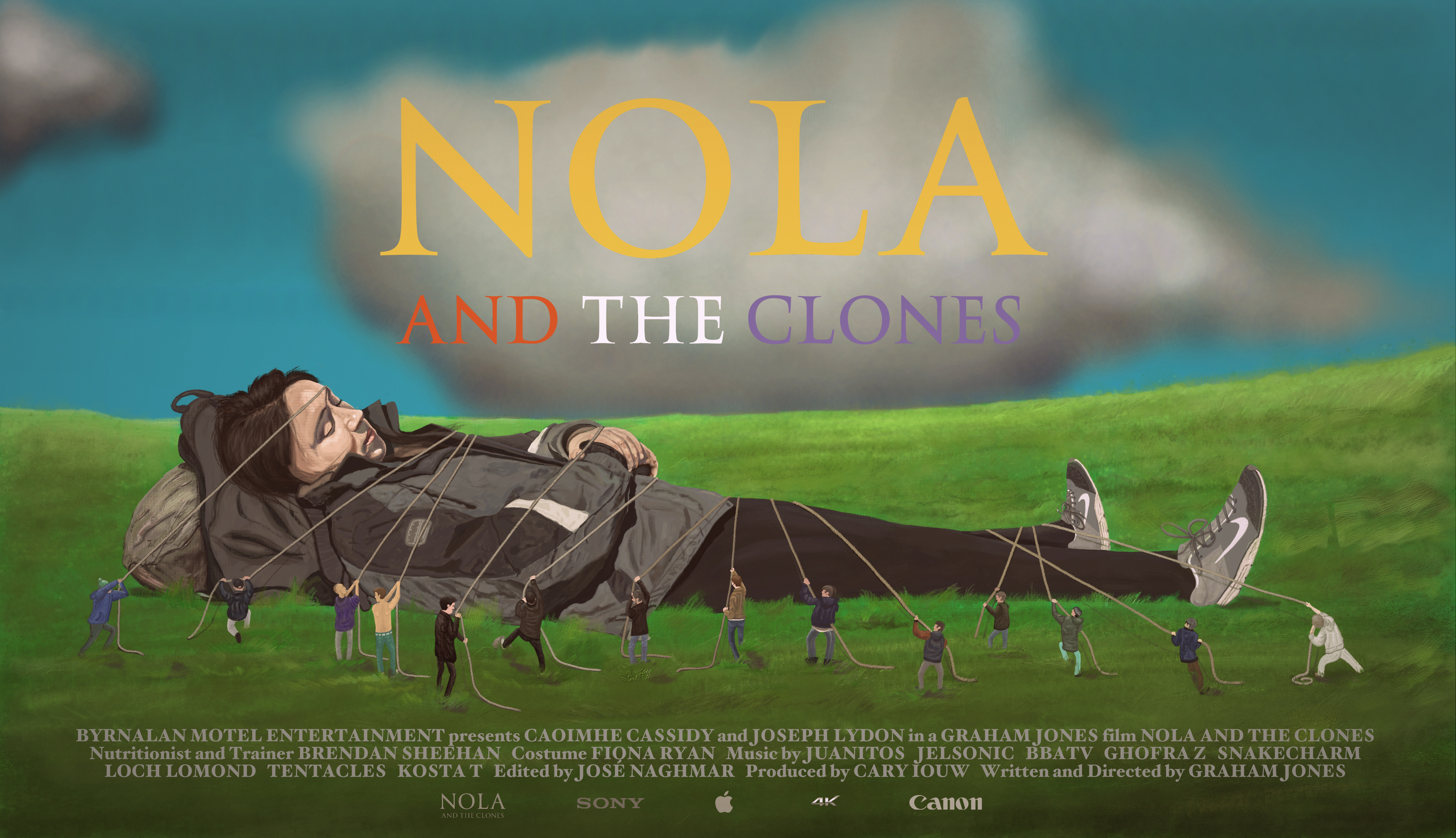
- Official Poster
- Directed by: Graham Jones
- Starring: Caoimhe Cassidy; Joseph Lydon
- Release date: 7 March 2016
- Running time: 82 minutes
- Country: Ireland
- Language: English

Nola and the Clones is a 2016 Irish film directed Graham Jones about a homeless girl in Dublin who encounters a series of men that appear strikingly similar to each other.

== Reception ==
Frank Ochieng of The Critical Movie Critics gave it positive review and wrote: "...vastly affecting...thankfully skilled gems such as Nola and the Clones will remind us that not all moving melodramas about rebellious young women on the edge simply belong on the Lifetime Channel."
