= Victor Burke =

Irish actor and voice actor

- Born: Victor Burke; 1974 (age 51–52); Dublin, Ireland
- Occupations: Actor and entrepreneur
- Years active: 1997 – present

Victor Burke is an Irish-born actor, voiceover artist, and entrepreneur from Dublin.

== Early life and career ==
Originally from Inchicore in Dublin, Burke is a fluent Irish language speaker having attended a Gaelscoil as a child.

As an eleven year old, he interviewed Jack Charlton, in 1986, who had become the manager of the Republic of Ireland football team. Brief footage of the interview was shown in the documentary Finding Jack Charlton (2020).

He made his stage debut at Dublin's Abbey Theatre, aged 13, in The Devil's Disciple. He went on to become a well-known actor in Ireland, playing the character of Wayne Molloy in the long-running RTÉ soap opera Fair City for more than seven seasons in his first spell in the show. He returned to the show in 2009. Burke also works as a voiceover artist, in 2002 he was the official voice of Compaq Computers worldwide for both radio and TV commercials.

His stage credits include The Last Apache Reunion, The Plough and The Stars, MacBeth, and Tarry Flynn. Victor also starred in Seán O'Casey's Juno and the Paycock at the Royal Lyceum Theatre in Edinburgh. He has also worked as a script doctor and author.

Burke lives in Malibu, California with his wife Fiona and two teenage children and commuted to Dublin to film scenes for Fair City. He also has a number of business interests including being a founder of digital signage company, IPC Digital Media, and is a partner in Wilde Irish gin and web-based advisory platform Dosen.

== Filmography ==
Year	Title	Role	Notes
1997	Homeboy	Homeboy (Michael)	
1998	Saving Private Ryan	Soldier on the Beach	
2000	Northern Lights	Leading Male	Short
2005	Welcome to September	Drew McCullough	
2008	8.5 Hours	Eoin	

== Television ==
- Rasaí na Gaillimhe TG4 2009 Irish language comedy/drama
- Butterfly Collectors (1999) (TV) as Liam
- Fair City (1992–1997) / (2009–Present) RTÉ TV series as Wayne Molloy (The character reappeared after Burke's departure, though played by another actor)

== Video games ==
- Dreamfall: The Longest Journey (2006) (voice) as Damien Cavanaugh

... aka Den lengste reisen: Drømmefall (Norway: dubbed version)
... aka Drømmefall: Den lengste reisen (Norway: PC version)

== Awards ==
Burke received the award for 'Best Actor in a Short Film' at the Edinburgh Film Festival for his role in Turnaround.

== See also ==
- List of Fair City characters
- List of longest-serving soap opera actors#Ireland
