= Niall O'Brien (actor) =

Irish actor

Niall O'Brien (8 February 1946 – 25 February 2009) was an Irish actor and member of the Abbey Theatre company, where he appeared in 130 productions. He also appeared in many films and television programmes.

== Early life ==
O'Brien was born to Maureen (née Wright) and Michael O'Brien on 8 February 1946. He was the youngest of five children. He was born in Dalkey village, County Dublin, and grew up in nearby Glasthule. He was educated at the CBS Westland Row, Dublin, before going on to join the Abbey School of acting.

== Career ==
After completing his Leaving Certificate, O'Brien started a building apprenticeship. Upon being accepted to the Abbey School of acting in the mid-1960s however, he took a year out of his apprenticeship to try a career as an actor and never went back to the construction industry.

In his career as an Abbey actor he took part in 130 theatre productions, including 27 world premiers. His first part was in the play Galileo in 1965. His last Abbey performance was appearing as Tom Mooney in Drama at Inis-Is Life Worth Living (2005). Niall toured internationally with the Abbey in Europe, Russia and much of the US.

In 1994 he appeared in a play by Irish playwright Teresa Deevy called "Katie Roche" where he played the part of Frank Lawlor.

O'Brien also appeared in numerous television and film productions throughout his career. These include the parts of Bernard in Ryan's Daughter (1971), Kay in Excalibur (1981), Owen McCarthy in The Year of the French (1982), Agent Rurik in Gorky Park (1983), Captain Twilley in Half Moon St (1986), Det. Insp. Isaac Gissing in Rawhead Rex (1986), Police Superintendent in The Playboys (1992), Josie McCarthy in Broken Harvest (1995) and Mr Moss in Vanity Fair (2004). He also appeared in single episodes of TV series Lovejoy, Boon, A Touch of Frost, Bachelors Walk and The Royal. In 2007 he was directed in the short film Teeth by his son, Ruairí O'Brien. This film went on to win awards at the Galway Film Fleadh and Brest European Short Film Festival .

== Personal life ==
He married Brigid Sinnott and they had four children, residing from 1984 in Bray, Co. Wicklow.

== Death ==
O'Brien died at home on 25 February 2009, from cancer, after a 20-month-long illness.

== Filmography ==
Year	Title	Role	Notes
1970	Ryan's Daughter	Bernard	
1978	Exposure	Oliver	
1979	The Outsider	Emmet Donovan	
1981	Excalibur	Kay	
1981	Lovespell	Corvenal	
1983	Gorky Park	KGB Agent Rurik	
1986	Rawhead Rex	Det. Insp. Isaac Gissing	
1986	Half Moon Street	Captain Twilley	
1991	King Ralph	McGuire	
1992	The Playboys	Police Superintendent	
1994	Black Beauty	Farmer Thoroughgood	
1994	Broken Harvest	Josie McCarthy	
1994	Ailsa	Counselor	
1995	Braveheart	English General	
1995	The Long Way Home	Ray Priest	
1997	The Last Bus Home	Jessop's Father	
1998	The Legend of 1900	Harbor Master	
2000	When Brendan Met Trudy	Judge	
2000	Rat	Man in Bookies	
2001	The Emperor's New Clothes	Bosun	
2003	Goldfish Memory	Taxi Driver	
2003	Conspiracy of Silence	John McLaughlin	
2004	Capital Letters	McManus	
2004	Vanity Fair	Mr. Moss	
2006	Secret of the Cave	Uncle Ben	
2008	Situations Vacant	Gerry O'Connell	(final film role)

== Playography ==
- Katie Roche 1994
