= The History Student =

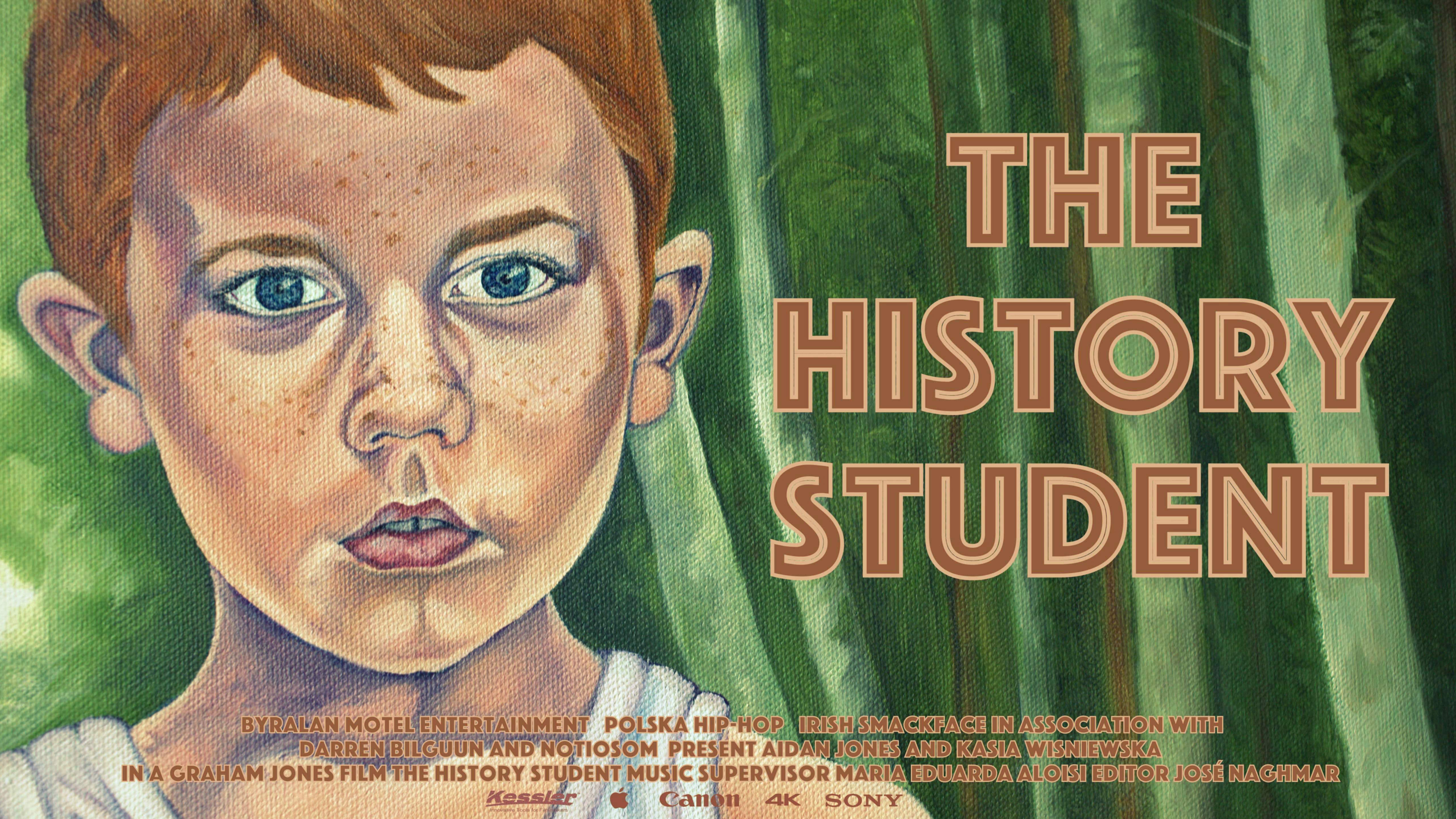
- Official Poster
- Directed by: Graham Jones
- Starring: Aidan Jones; Kasia Wisniewska
- Release date: 9 May 2015
- Running time: 70 minutes
- Countries: Ireland; Poland
- Language: Polish

The History Student is a 2015 Irish-Polish film directed by Graham Jones about a seven-year-old boy from Dublin who is spending a rural summer holiday in his mother's native Poland and on strict instructions to speak only that country's language - when he finds the words to ask where aliens fit into nature, it stirs memories of her own childhood when the answer was clear.
