= Silicon Docks (film) =

- Directed by: Graham Jones
- Written by: Graham Jones
- Starring: Grace Power; Shane Lynch; Brendan McDonald; Fiona Bawn-Thompson; Bobby Calloway; Rob Smith; José Naghmar; Gerry Cannon; Matthew McMahon
- Music by: Freedom Trail Studio, Futuremono, The Tower of Light, RKVC, Ashley Shadow, Dan Lebowitz
- Animation by: Kasia Wiśniewska
- Release date: 2022
- Running time: 83 minutes
- Country: Ireland
- Language: English

Silicon Docks is a 2022 animated feature film from Irish director Graham Jones portraying a group of American tech moguls on a failed Dublin pub crawl during the international pandemic.
