= Geraldine Plunkett =

Irish actress

- Occupation: Actress
- Notable work: Glenroe

Geraldine Plunkett is an Irish actress famously known for her part as Mary McDermott-Moran in the Irish television series Glenroe. Geraldine Plunkett also appeared in Fair City as Rose O’Brien. She played a recurring character for the first 3 seasons on The Clinic.

Theatre roles include the Juno, in Seán O'Casey's Juno and the Paycock, played opposite Donal McCann, John Kavanagh and Maureen Potter. (the Paycock – Captain Boyle) 1980. Madeira - The Secrets of Sisters (2025).

== Filmography ==
Character	Production	Year
Ann Lang	No Offence	2015
Shop Owner	The Stand Up	2013
Róisín	4 Bhanrion	2013
Mary Muldoon	The Square of the Cube	2013
Maura	Trivia	2012
Annette	Insatiable	2008
Maggie	8.5 Hours	2008
Mrs. Fleming	The Clinic	2003–2005
Mary McDermott-Moran	Glenroe	1983–2001
