= Philip O'Sullivan =

Irish actor

- Occupation: Actor
- Notable work: Katie Roche, Game of Thrones, Vikings

Philip O'Sullivan is an Irish actor with contributions to Irish arts and culture through his roles and performances in theatre, film, and television. O'Sullivan has been involved with the Abbey Theatre Ireland since the 1970s. In 1975, he appeared in an Abbey Theatre production of a play by Irish playwright Teresa Deevy called Katie Roche where he played the part of Michael Maguire. This production ran for 21 performances.

O'Sullivan is also known for voice acting roles and his character driven distinguishable voice forms the sound track for many advertisements.

== Early life ==
Irish actor Philip (Thomas John) O'Sullivan was born in Dublin on 4 April 1956, as one of nine children born to Marie (née Stanford) O'Sullivan and John F. (Jack) O'Sullivan, a consultant surgeon at the Mater Hospital. His father died the following year, aged 42.

He attended primary and secondary education at Terenure College Dublin. Although renowned for their rugby prowess, they also had a thriving theatre tradition and Philip appeared in a wide variety of roles. Pre voice-breaking parts included Soothsayer in Julius Caesar, Duchess of York in Richard III, and Maisie Madigan in Juno and the Paycock, followed by McLoghlain "The Curate" in Joseph Tomelty's Is the Priest at Home and Seamus Sheilds in The Shadow of a Gunman. He was also active in the local drama society, directing and appearing in The Merchant of Venice, Macbeth and A Man for All Seasons.

== Career ==
In his final year at Terenure College in 1973, he was spotted by Joe Dowling playing Donald in a production of Simon Gray's Spoiled at the Project Arts Centre. This led to an offer to join the Young Abbey Theatre Group, a theatre in education element of the Abbey at that time. A year later he was offered a contract with the Abbey Theatre Company, Ireland's National Theatre, one of the youngest actors ever to receive a Players contract. He appeared in numerous plays on both Tte Abbey and Peacock stages during his first contract. The Vicar of Wakefield, Ulysees in Nighttown, Oedipus, Mrs. Warren's Profession, All You Need is Love, Three Sisters, Sanctified Distances, Purgatory, Find the Lady, Blood Wedding, Katie Roche, Stephen D and The Life and Times of Benvenuto Cellini.

From 1979 to 1981, he freelanced, pursuing film and television work and independent theatre opportunities. In this time, he worked with the Irish Theatre Company, principally touring Ben Traver's A Cuckoo in the Nest. He played David Charters in SOS Titanic (EMI Films) and made two major TV series for RTE, The Burke Enigma, a drama produced and directed by Brian Mac Lochlainn, and Seán, a thirteen-hour drama series on the early life of Sean O'Casey that was produced and directed by Louis Lentin. He also starred as Artie in RTE's television adaptation of Teresa's Wedding by William Trevor, which was directed by Donal Farmer. Theatre appearances included Billy Bibbit in One Flew Over The Cuckoo's Nest (Noel Pearson Productions), Simon Bliss in Hay Fever, John Brown in Robin Glendinning's Jennifer's Vacation (Gate Theatre), Romeo in Romeo and Juliet (Louis O'Sullivan Productions) and Alistair Spenlow in Move Over Mrs. Markham (Oscar Theatre).

On his return under contract to the Abbey Theatre in 1981, a time he referred to in a radio interview as "the happy time", he was involved in several new plays as well as the more traditional Abbey Theatre cannon. Plays and musicals included Mary Makebelieve, The Lugnaquilla Gorilla, Hamlet, The Plough and the Stars, The Hidden Curriculum, Childish Things, Fiche Blían ag Fás, Petty Sessions, The Merchant of Venice, The Glass Menagerie and The Silver Dollar Boys.

He left the Abbey Theatre in late 1983 with performances and productions totalling over 50 plays, 19 of which were world premieres and four were musicals. In 1983, he worked again for RTE playing Sweeney in Eagles and Trumpets (directed by Deirdre Friel) and for Mobile Showcase Theatre USA, as Tarquin in A Careful Man by Frederick Forsythe. In early 1984, he was one of the founding members of Smock Alley Theatre Company, an avant-garde and Arts Council funded actor-collective, working without any theatre directors and focusing mainly on reworking neglected classics. The Company was also designed to tour Ireland extensively, replacing the gap left by the defunct Irish Theatre Company. The crew and the production essentials travelled in a van, with all the technical responsibilities shared by the actors. Smock Alley's first production was Congreve's Love for Love, with O'Sullivan taking the role of Valentine.

In this same year, he had an offer from RTE's Brian Mac Lochlainn to play Fr.Michael in the new TV sit-com Leave it to Mrs. O'Brien. He continued appearances at the Abbey Theatre and the Peacock, Manus in The Hard Life by Flann O'Brien in 1986 and Dave in Neil Donnelly's Goodbye Carraroe in 1989. It would be in 2007 when he would next appear at Ireland's National Theatre.

Since the 1990s and 2000s, he has continued to work on many films, television shows, plays, and recordings. Film and television appearances included five years as Fr.Tracey in RTE's flagship Sunday night drama Glenroe from 1997 to 2001. He also appeared in Veronica Guerin, The American, The Return and Studs with guest appearances in Anytime Now, Fair City, Foreign Bodies, and Showbands 1 and 2. At the Gate Theatre, he appeared as Stryver KC in A Tale of Two Cities, Mr. Boon in You Never Can Tell, Mr.Dunby in Lady Windemere's Fan, Clitandre in The Misanthrope, and Cléante in Tartuffe. At the Focus Theatre, he played Harry in Albee's A Delicate Balance, the Father in Jennifer Johnston's How Many Miles to Babylon (Second Age), and Gerard in Rodney Lee's The Gist Of It for the Fishamble Theatre Company. At the Abbey Theatre, there were two appearances in 2007 and 2008 as Reverend Brown in Lennox Robinson's The Big House directed by Conall Morrison and as Clark in The Resistible Rise of Arturo Ui by Berthold Brecht, directed by Jimmy Fay.

In 2004, he was engaged by Ouroboros Theatre Company as Baron van Sweeten in Amadeus, which subsequently led on to him playing Peter Lombard in Geoff Gould's production of Brian Friel's Making History in 2006 and 2007. This was a record-breaking production that opened in the Samuel Beckett Theatre Dublin and played all over Ireland in various site-specific venues that were made available by the Office of Public Works. In 2007, the 400th anniversary of The Flight of The Earls, the production also toured to several cities in France and Switzerland following the route of Hugh O'Neill's trek across Europe and finally to Rome. Ouroboros were subsequently invited to perform the play for Brian Friel at the celebrations for his 18th birthday at the Magill Summer School, Glenties County Donegal in July 2009. Ouroboros and O'Sullivan were also involved in many other theatrical tributes to Friel, notably in Paris, where Brian Friel was honoured at the Irish Cultural Centre on the Rue des Irelandais.

In 2005, he was asked to play Ross Tuttle in Edward Albee's highly controversial play The Goat, or who is Sylvia? for Landmark Productions under its Director and founder Anne Clarke. This began an association with Landmark that lasts to this day. In 2006, Landmark produced Glen Berger's acclaimed one-actor play Underneath The Lintel with O'Sullivan playing the obsessional Dutch librarian in search of The Wandering Jew. The play premiered initially at the Dublin Fringe Festival in the Project Arts Centre receiving rave reviews. There were subsequent productions at the Helix and Andrew's Lane Theatre in 2007, followed by a nation-wide tour. In 2010, Landmark presented the play at the Edinburgh Festival, where it and its performer received five-star receptions from Libby Purvis of the Times, amongst many others. Also in 2007, Landmark produced the huge hit The Last Days of the Celtic Tiger in the Olympia Theatre by Paul Howard, a satire on Ireland's 'get rich quick' years leading up to "The Crash" of 2008. O'Sullivan played Charles O'Carroll Kelly, the corrupt, ruthless father of the play's rugby-glory days fantasist and narcissistic anti-hero Ross. Paul Howard wrote and Landmark produced two further Ross satires, Between Foxrock And A Hard Place in 2010 and 2011, and Breaking Dad in 2014 and 2015 with O'Sullivan reprising his role as Charles. All three plays were directed by Jimmy Fay and popular with the public.

In 2013, he began filming on Vikings as the recurring character Bishop Edmund, advisor to King Ekbert played by his friend Linus Roache. O'Sullivan appeared in three seasons. It was the second time that he had played a "High Priest" type role for Octagon Films, having played the Archbishop of Canterbury, Wareham, in The Tudors in 2007 and 2008.

In 2016, Jimmy Fay, Artistic Director of the Lyric Theatre Belfast, commissioned O'Sullivanto adapt Shaw's St. Joan for The Lyric's Autumn Season of that year. The goal was to make Shaw's original script viable in economic and resource challenged times. Shaw's play had a speaking cast of 22 characters and a running time of over four hours. The result was an adaptation using seven actors and a playing time of two hours, excluding intermission. It was a critical success when it opened in September 2016, but not a commercial success. As the copyright on Shaw's plays ran out at the end of 2020, there was interest from theatres in the US and Australia looking to use this version of Shaw's masterpiece. While in Belfast, O'Sullivan guested in an Episode of Game of Thrones as a Citadel Maestor.

Towards the end of 2016, O'Sullivan was cast in Mel Gibson's film The Professor and The Madman, as the prosecuting Queen's Counsel to Sean Penn's accused and mad Dr. Minor.

In 2017, he played Colonel Crael in The Inspector Jury Mysteries, a German TV detective series.

In 2019, he filmed with director Ronan O'Leary on Gerard Daly's script A Sunken Place and also completed the film Calvings, written and directed by Louis Bhose.

== Personal life ==
Philip O'Sullivan married Sandra Ellis on January 12, 1990. They have a daughter Jeanne-Marie. He lives in Glasthule, County Dublin. His hobbies include walking and meeting on Killiney Hill, France. He enjoys wine "from any region of the Roman Empire", good conversation, politics, history, and the 64 Bistro.

== Filmography ==
Role	Production	Year
Peter Bacon	The Bailout	2017
Citadel Maester	Game of Thrones	2017
Bishop Edmund	Vikings	2014–2015
Mr Gilligan	Albert Nobbs	2011
Uncle Charlie	Belonging to Laura	2009
Kevin Walsh Snr	Pure Mule: The Last Weekend	2009
Bishop Wanham / Bishop Warham	The Tudors	2007–2008
Bill McKimm	Anner House	2007
Assistant Governor	The Tigers Tail	2006
Fr. Healy	Showbands II	2006
Kevin Walsh Snr	Pure Mule: The Last Weekend	2005
Vicar	The League of Gentlemen's Apocalypse	2005
Anthony	The Baby War	2005
Fr. Healy	Showbands	2005
Gerry Lynch	The Return	2003
Solicitor	Veronica Guerin	2003
Fr. Tracey	Glenroe	1999
Callaghan	The Ambassador	1998

== Playography ==
- Katie Roche (1975)
