= The Randomers =

- Directed by: Graham Jones
- Starring: Sarah Jane Murphy; Joseph Lydon
- Music by: John Wright
- Release date: 1 February 2014
- Running time: 70 minutes
- Country: Ireland
- Language: English

The Randomers is a 2014 Irish romantic film from the Irish director Graham Jones about a young woman on the west coast of Ireland who places an advertisement seeking a male for a relationship without speaking.
