= Graham Jones (director) =

Irish film director (born 1973)

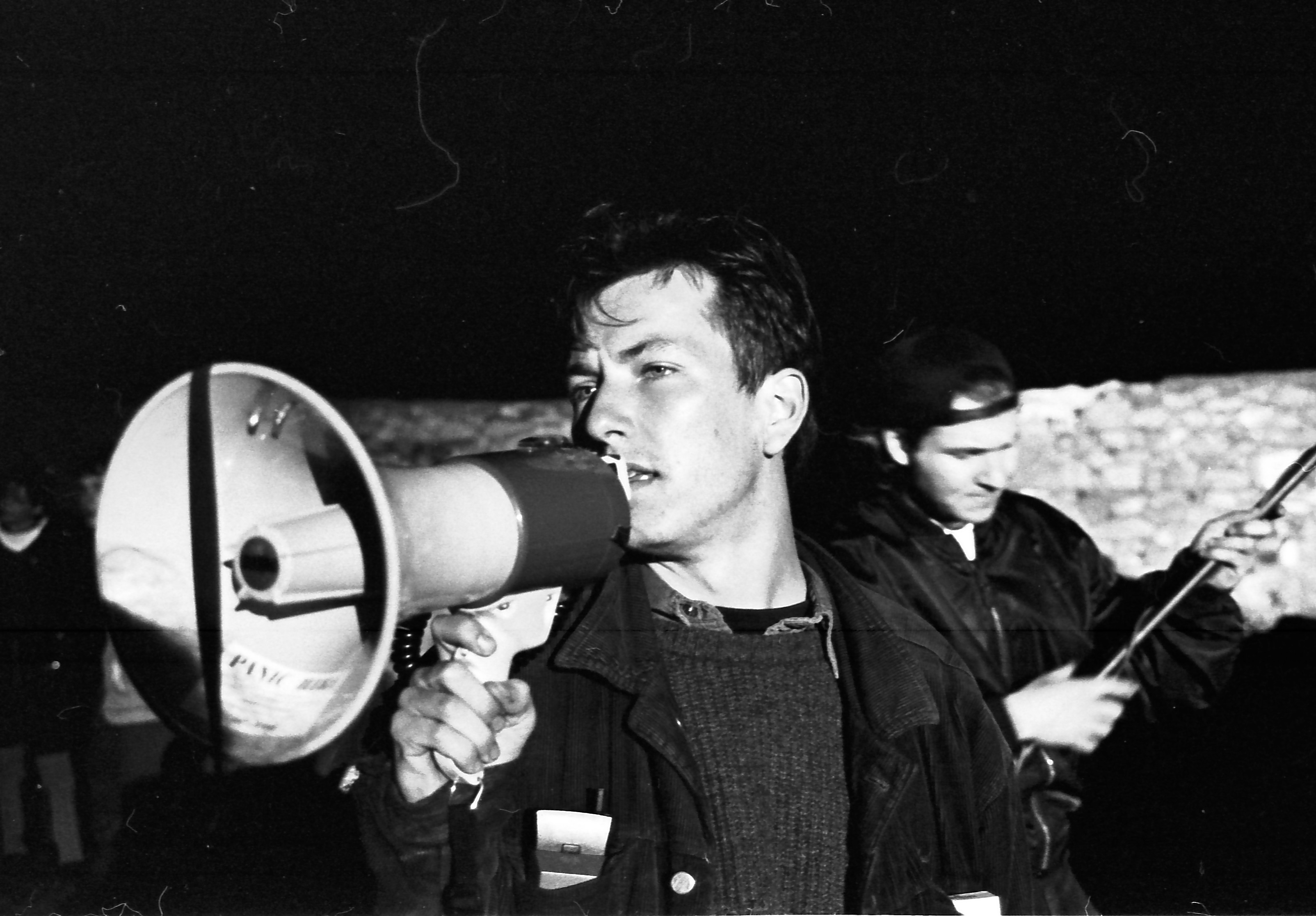
- Jones in 2011
- Born: 25 November 1973 (age 52); Dublin, Ireland
- Occupation: Filmmaker
- Years active: 1996–present

Graham Jones (born 25 November 1973) is an Irish filmmaker.

Jones made his first feature film How to Cheat in the Leaving Certificate in 1997 which caused controversy when it was condemned by the Junior Minister for Education Willie O'Dea. It marked the beginning of a career in which Jones would explore many difficult subjects through independent movies including suicide, prostitution, homelessness, evolution, gender and the impact of the internet upon art.

Variety described Jones as "a very talented director". In 2010, he wrote the book Irish Ghost, English Accent.

== Filmography ==
Year	Title	Director	Writer	Notes
1997	How to Cheat in the Leaving Certificate	Yes	Yes	Also producer
2005	Fudge 44	Yes	Yes	
2012	The Green Marker Scare	Yes	Yes	
2013	The Randomers	Yes	Yes	
2014	Davin	Yes	Yes	
2015	The History Student	Yes	Yes	
2016	Nola and the Clones	Yes	Yes	
2017	Sunshine Ukulele	Yes	Yes	
2019	Rainy in Glenageary	Yes	Yes	Documentary
2022	Silicon Docks	Yes	Yes	
