= Niall Tóibín =

Irish comedian and actor (1929–2019)

- Born: 21 November 1929; Cork, Ireland
- Died: 13 November 2019 (aged 89); Dublin, Ireland
- Occupation: Actor-comedian
- Years active: 1950s–2018
- Spouse: Frances Judith Kenny (m. 1957; died 2002)
- Website: nialltoibin.com (archived)

Niall Tóibín (Irish pronunciation: [ˈn̠ʲiəl̪ˠ t̪ˠoːˈbʲiːnʲ]; 21 November 1929 – 13 November 2019) was an Irish comedian and actor. Born in Cork into an Irish-speaking family, Tóibín grew up on the northside of the city in Bishop's Field.

He appeared in Ryan's Daughter, Brideshead Revisited, Bracken, The Ballroom of Romance, The Irish R.M., Caught in a Free State, Ballykissangel, Far and Away, and Veronica Guerin. He was awarded honorary lifetime membership of the Irish Film and Television Academy (IFTA) in 2011 and the Freedom of Cork in 2015.

== Early life ==
Tóibín was born in 1929 in Cork, Ireland, the sixth of seven children, born to Siobhán (née Ní Shúileabháin) and Seán Tóibín, native Irish speakers. His parents married in 1917. His father was born in Passage West, County Cork, and his parents came from Waterford and West Cork. Seán Tóibín was a teacher in the School of Commerce in Cork city and the author of two books, Blátha an Bhóithrín and Troscán na mBánta, on wayside and meadowland flowers, both written in the Irish language. His mother, Siobhán Ni Shúilleabháin, came from Beaufort, County Kerry.

Niall was born on the southside of Cork city in Friars' Walk. He was raised with Irish and used the language in his professional career, notably in the film Poitín. His siblings included Siobhán, Tomás (a poet), Déaglán, Filmin, Gobnait and Colm Tóibín.

As a child, he sang in the cathedral choir and in the Opera House in Cork. In his teens, he joined a drama society attached to the Keating Branch of the Gaelic League. He was educated by the Irish Christian Brothers at the North Monastery (North Mon) after which he left Cork for a job in the Civil Service in Dublin in January 1947.

In 1957, Tóibín married Frances Judith "Judy" Kenny (died 26 June 2002, aged 70) in Dublin. He had five children, and seven grandchildren.

== Career ==
Working originally as a civil service clerk with the Department of External Affairs, Tóibín started acting in the 1950s and spent fourteen years with the Radio Éireann Players.

From Ryan's Daughter and Bracken in the 1970s, to The Ballroom of Romance, The Irish R.M., Brideshead Revisited and Caught in a Free State in the 1980s, and Far and Away, Ballykissangel and Veronica Guerin in the 1990s and 2000s, Toibin's entertainment career in television, film and theatre spanned over four decades. He also acted for the radio, such as his guest appearance in the BBC Radio 4 series Baldi.

In 2005, he "cemented" his hands outside the Gaiety Theatre, Dublin. He made a speech saying, "It will be a proud day for me. My appearances on the Gaiety stage are without doubt the highlights of my career and I am honoured to have been asked to give my prints".

He played Dr. Paul O'Callaghan in the first two series of the Irish TV programme The Clinic.

He played Judge Ballaugh, alongside Cate Blanchett, in Joel Schumacher's film Veronica Guerin.

== Awards ==
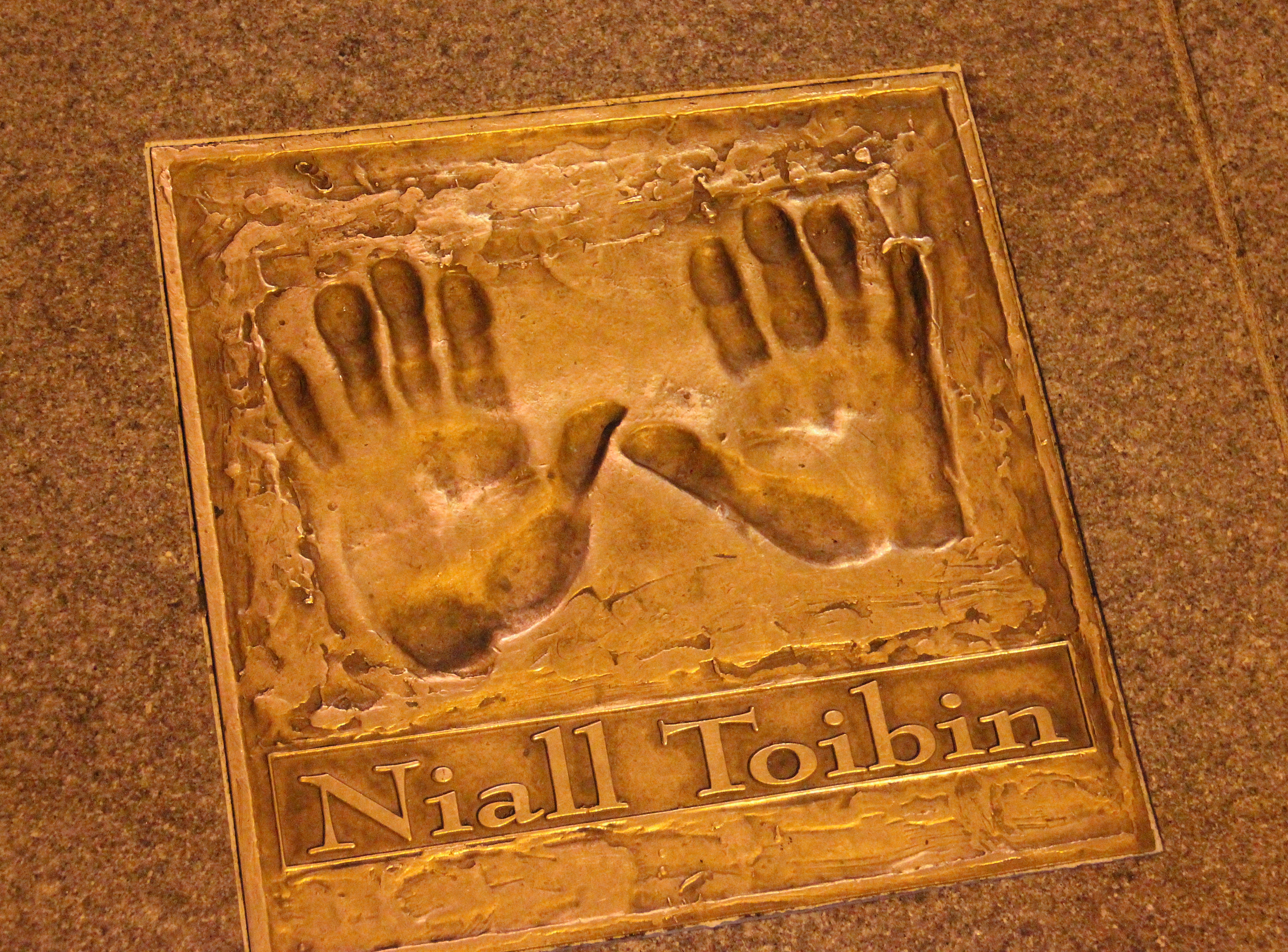
Tóibín's handprint in front of the Gaiety Theatre in Dublin, Ireland.

In 1973, Tóibín won a Jacob's Award for his performance in the RTÉ comedy series, If The Cap Fits.

On 29 October 2002, Tóibín won Best Actor at the Christian Film and Television Excellence awards ceremony in Dublin.

Tóibín received an Honorary Doctor of Arts Degree from University College Cork (UCC) on 4 June 2010.

He was honoured with the Irish Film and Television Academy's (IFTA) Lifetime Achievement Award at a ceremony at the Irish Film Institute on 3 November 2011. The award meant Tóibín became an honorary IFTA lifetime member.

== Later life and death ==
In May 2015, Tóibín was awarded the Freedom of Cork in recognition of his film, television and stage work.

Tóibín died in Dublin on 13 November 2019, eight days before his 90th birthday, having suffered from a form of dementia in the years before he died.

== Filmography ==
Year	Title	Role	Notes
1969	Guns in the Heather	Kettering	
1970	Ryan's Daughter	O'Keefe	
1971	Flight of the Doves	Sergeant O'Casey	
1971	L'iguana dalla lingua di fuoco	Doctor	Uncredited
1977	Philadelphia, Here I Come	Con Sweeney	
1978	Poitín	Sleamhnan	
1979	The Outsider	The Farmer	
1980	The Sleep of Death	Sean	
1981	Lovespell	Andred	
1984	Reflections	Mr. Prunty	
1986	The Ballroom of Romance	Eyes Horgan	
1986	Rawhead Rex	Reverend Coot	
1986	Eat the Peach	Boots	
1990	Fools of Fortune	Lanigan	
1992	Far and Away	Joe	
1995	Frankie Starlight	Handy Paige	
1998	The Nephew	Sean	
2000	Rat	Father Geraldo	
2003	Veronica Guerin	Judge Ballaugh	
2018	Remains	Patrick	Short, (final film role)
