= Wesley Burrowes =

Irish playwright and scriptwriter (1930–2015)

- Born: 15 April 1930; Bangor, County Down, Northern Ireland
- Died: 31 December 2015 (aged 85)
- Education: Queen's University Belfast (QUB)
- Occupations: Playwright, screenwriter
- Writing career
- Notable works: The Riordans, Glenroe

Wesley Burrowes (15 April 1930 – 31 December 2015) was an Irish playwright and screenwriter. Originally from Northern Ireland, he became a resident of the Republic of Ireland. He was best known as the chief scriptwriter on The Riordans and Glenroe, two of the most successful drama series produced by RTÉ Television.

== Early life ==
Wesley Burrowes was born and raised in Bangor, County Down in Northern Ireland. From a Protestant background, Burrowes was educated at the Royal Belfast Academical Institution, a Belfast grammar school, and went on to study French and German at Queen's University Belfast, graduating in 1952.

Following graduation, Burrowes moved to Dublin to work for the Commercial Insurance Company. In 1959, he switched jobs to Córas Tráchtála, an Irish government body which promoted exports. He combined his job there as an adviser on the furniture trade with that of writer of comedy sketches for revue performers such as Des Keogh and Rosaleen Linehan. In 1963, he resigned from his day job to become a full-time writer.

== Theatre ==
Burrowes' first theatrical success was the musical Carrie, which he co-wrote with Michael Coffey and James Douglas. It was premiered at Dublin's Olympia Theatre in September 1963 during the Sixth Annual Dublin Theatre Festival. Regarded at the time as a lavish production, Carrie was directed by Peter Collinson, and starred Milo O'Shea, Ray McAnally, and David Kelly.

In 1969, Burrowes won the Irish Life Drama Competition for his play, The Becauseway, which the author described as belonging to "the tradition of the theatre of the absurd". A revised version of the play received its premiere at the Peacock Theatre four months later. He was successful in the 1970 Irish Life Competition, winning the top award for And All the People Rejoiced. Under its new title, A Loud Bang on June the First, the play received its first production at the Abbey Theatre in February 1971.

Due to his television commitments, only one other full-length Burrowes play reached the theatrical stage. This was Affluence, a comedy first produced by the Irish Theatre Company in August 1980.

== Television ==
In 1964, Burrowes' got his first break in television when he replaced Maura Laverty as script writer on RTÉ Television's drama series, Tolka Row. Two years later he became editor and chief script writer for the station's long-running rural soap opera, The Riordans. Between 1966 and 1979, when The Riordans ended its run, Burrowes wrote over 300 of the weekly scripts and edited most of those produced by the other writers.

In 1983, Burrowes created another success for RTÉ in the form of the drama serial Glenroe. He became one of three writers who contributed scripts during the series' eighteen-year run. Burrowes ensured his scripts were authentic by meeting farmers regularly in pubs and listening to their opinions and insights. Glenroe developed out of an earlier series which Burrowes conceived and wrote for RTÉ in 1980. This was Bracken, which featured Gabriel Byrne in the lead role of Pat Barry.

Burrowes' contribution to television drama was recognised by the three Jacob's Awards he won in 1965, 1974, and 1976. The last two of these were specifically for his work on The Riordans.

== Film ==
In July 2000, the Wesley Burrowes-scripted film, Rat received its world premiere at the Galway Film Fleadh. This was Burrowes first screenplay, a surrealist comedy set in working-class Dublin. His second film as scriptwriter, Mystics, was released in 2003.

== Other pursuits ==
Burrowes composed the lyrics of "If I Could Choose", Ireland's entry in the 1967 Eurovision Song Contest. The song came second in the contest.

He was a skilled bridge player who represented Ireland in the inaugural 1960 World Team Olympiad, tying for 16th among 29 entries.

== Personal life ==
Burrowes married the actress, Liz Brennan in 1959; they divorced in 1967 having had a daughter, Ciara, together. He married his second wife, Helena Ruuth, in 1969 and they have a son, Kim. Burrowes lived in Bray, County Wicklow until his death on 31 December 2015, aged 85, following a long illness.
