= If the Cap Fits (TV series) =

- Genre: Comedy
- Written by: Niall Tóibín; Eoghan Harris
- Starring: Niall Tóibín
- Country of origin: Ireland
- Original language: English
- No. of series: 1

Production
- Producer: Brian Mac Lochlainn
- Production locations: Studio 1, RTÉ Television Centre, Donnybrook, Dublin 4, Ireland
- Camera setup: Multi-camera
- Running time: 30 minutes

Original release
- Network: RTÉ
- Release: 18 June 1973

If the Cap Fits is an Irish television sketch show that aired on RTÉ for one series in 1973. The show was written by and starred Niall Tóibín.

== History ==
The show premiered on 18 June 1973. It was produced and directed by Brian MacLochlainn. Niall Tóibín received a Jacob's Award for If the Cap Fits in 1973. In Tóibín's 2019 obituary, The Irish Times called RTÉ's the show "one of the station's rare comedy successes".

The show was perceived as "too risqué" to be renewed. Owing to the demands of the fundamentalist Catholics, the show was scrapped and all tapes of it were erased. If the Cap Fits was the catalyst for the establishment of the Irish League of Decency.

== Content ==
Throughout all the episodes, Tóibín portrayed 90 characters. In a scene, Tóibín's character was a nun who took out Guinness that was stashed in her clothes. Barbara Brennan, Chris Curran, Maura Hastings, Eileen Murphy, and Derry Power participated in the sketch scenes.

== Reception ==
Ken Gray of The Irish Times praised the show for "the variety of voices and accents is marvellous, and marvellously accurate" and said, "There is more savage bite in the comedy, too, than in anything R.T.E. has so far ventured to put on television". Gray said of Tóibín's performance, "He may not always look the part, though the make-up is good, but the accent and inflexion he gets into his satirical impersonations are often deadly." He particularly liked Tóibín's portrays of Dick Burke, George Colley, Patrick Hillery, and Tony O'Reilly.

The author Helena Sheehan called the show and Time Now Mr T "some of the best political and social satire produced by RTE" and that all episodes on the two shows were "a veritable tour de force on the part of Niall Tóibín".
