= This Is My Father =

- Directed by: Paul Quinn
- Screenplay by: Paul Quinn
- Produced by: Nicolas Clermont; Philip King
- Starring: Aidan Quinn; James Caan; Stephen Rea; John Cusack; Jacob Tierney; Colm Meaney; Donal Donnelly; Moya Farrelly
- Cinematography: Declan Quinn
- Edited by: Glenn Berman
- Music by: Donal Lunny
- Production companies: Filmline International; Hummingbrid Communications
- Distributed by: Sony Pictures Classics (US)
- Release dates: June 14, 1998 (Seattle International Film Festival); May 7, 1999 (United States)
- Running time: 119 minutes
- Countries: Canada; Ireland
- Language: English
- Box office: $1,078,737

This Is My Father is a 1998 Canadian-Irish film directed by Paul Quinn.

== Plot ==
The film portrays a tragic love story set in late 1930s Ireland, focusing on the relationship between Fiona Flynn (Moya Farrelly), a beautiful, feisty seventeen-year-old from a middle-class family, and Kieran O'Dea (Aidan Quinn), a shy labourer in his early thirties, and the search decades later by their son, Kieran Johnson, (James Caan) to find his roots in late 1990s Ireland.

The film is told as an interweaving of the nineties setting, where Kieran is hearing the story of his parents, and the events of the 1930s. Kieran Johnson grew into adulthood unaware of his parents' story or of the tragic events that caused his mother to leave Ireland on her own while pregnant.

The story highlights the issues of prejudice, classism, alcoholism and social and religious conservatism in rural 1930s Ireland.

== Cast ==
Main cast

- Aidan Quinn as Kieran O'Dea
- James Caan as Kieran Johnson
- Moya Farrelly as Fiona Flynn
- Jacob Tierney as Jack
- Gina Moxley as Widow Flynn

Supporting Cast

- Colm Meaney as Seamus (Bed and Breakfast Owner)
- Moira Deady as Mrs. Kearney
- John Cusack as Eddie Sharp (Pilot)
- Brendan Gleeson as Garda Jim
- Pat Shortt as Garda Ben
- Maria McDermottroe as Mrs. Maney
- Donal Donnelly as John Maney
- Eamon Morrissey as Father Mooney
- Stephen Rea as Mission Priest
- John Kavanagh as Liam Finneran
- Karen Ardiff as Young Mrs. Kearney
- Sheila Flitton as Mrs. Madigan
- Pauline Hutton as Maria
- Fiona Glascott as Nuala

== Reception ==
Roger Ebert given the film 3 out of 4 stars and compared it to his own visit to Ireland in 1967.
