= Sunshine Ukulele =

- Directed by: Graham Jones
- Written by: Graham Jones
- Starring: Ian Cox; Andy Eastwood; George Elmes; Aidan Jones; Hugo Monks; José Naghmar
- Release date: 23 June 2017 (Ireland)
- Running time: 72 minutes
- Country: Ireland
- Language: English

Sunshine Ukulele is a 2017 Irish feature film from Irish director Graham Jones about a young Irish boy who receives the gift of a ukulele from his uncle and proceeds upon a comic, suburban, mini-odyssey in which he struggles to properly identify with the nineteenth century instrument.

== Cast ==
- Ian Cox as Self
- Andy Eastwood as Self
- George Elmes as Self
- Aidan Jones as Self
- Hugo Monks as Self
- José Naghmar as Self
- Greg Peterson as Self
- Del Rey as Del Rey
- Aidan Sharpe as Self
- John Wright as JB
