= Rat (film) =

2000 film by Steve Barron

- DVD cover
- Directed by: Steve Barron
- Written by: Wesley Burrowes
- Produced by: Steve Barron; Alison Owen
- Starring: Imelda Staunton; Pete Postlethwaite
- Cinematography: Brendan Galvin
- Edited by: David Yardley
- Music by: Pete Briquette; Bob Geldof
- Production company: The Jim Henson Company
- Distributed by: Universal Focus (United States); Universal Pictures International (International; through United International Pictures)
- Release date: 6 October 2000
- Running time: 88 minutes
- Countries: Ireland; United Kingdom; United States
- Language: English
- Box office: $2,630

Rat is a 2000 comedy film directed by Steve Barron and starring Imelda Staunton and Pete Postlethwaite. The film focuses on the transformation of a working-class man into a rat and how his family copes with the startling change. The film's scenario is partly based on Franz Kafka's The Metamorphosis.

== Plot ==
After his usual night of drinking at the local pub, Hubert Flynn returns home and transforms into a rat. Hubert's family each have different views on him now that he became a rodent. His wife Conchita thinks that this change is supposed to be a lesson to Hubert and that the reason he transformed is his own fault. Their son Pius, destined for a religious life, feels that because his father is now an animal, his family should kill him. Their daughter Marietta feels that the rat is still her father and that they should treat him with love and respect.

After hearing the news of a man changing into a rat on the local radio, ghostwriter Phelim Spratt convinces Conchita to write a book of the story. Because Phelim wants to write about Conchita's bravery and the family's loyalty to Hubert in the face of adversity, he suggests that they take Hubert out to the pub and bookie to see his friends and to show the public that they are proud of him.

Conchita sends for her brother, Matt, whom she describes as "a rock of sense". After telling the family all of the changes they will have to undergo, including Hubert's poor hygiene, unemployment, and unusual diet, Matt feels that Hubert would be more comfortable in a maggot factory with other rats. This decision is further solidified after Hubert bites Conchita on the finger.

After the family leaves him at the maggot factory, Hubert treks forty miles back to the house to be with his family on Christmas. With Hubert nearly dead from exhaustion, Conchita calls the doctor and sends Pius to get Father Geraldo to perform the last rites and an exorcism. After the doctor tells Conchita to cool Hubert down because of his fever, they put him in the refrigerator. Father Geraldo then arrives and performs the exorcism and Hubert emerges from the refrigerator as a man.

Because Hubert turned back into a man, Phelim and Conchita are nervous that no one will believe their story. They decide to lock Hubert in his room and use a replacement rat for public appearances. However, Hubert's old flame and neighbour, Daisy becomes sceptical when she hears him yelling that he needs to use the bathroom and calls for the police to investigate. While Hubert is in the bathroom, he remembers that as a rat, he saw Phelim hide the manuscript of the book in a cupboard. He takes the manuscript and hides it in his shirt. When the family realise that Hubert should be away from prying eyes, Conchita goes to tell him that they are sending him to a mental hospital until the book comes out.

When the police arrive, Marietta finds a letter written by her father saying that he feels the same way that he did before he turned into a rat. A rat then runs out the door and the family chases it in the street. When they get the rat back, Phelim tries to put it in the oven and it bites him on the finger. Hubert then appears behind them as a man and explains that the rat Phelim is holding is Conchita. He says that when he bit her earlier, he felt something leave his body and enter hers. He then explains that instead of a book about the family's loyalty, Phelim has been writing about their thoughts of killing Hubert and plans to abandon him at the maggot factory. They throw Phelim out and tell him never to return.

Marietta is worried about her mother and Hubert says that she will turn back into a woman when she serves her time. The film ends with the family at the pub with Hubert and Conchita, now a woman again, singing karaoke. It also shows a rat in the pub that has an earring like the one that Phelim wears.

== Cast ==
- Imelda Staunton as Conchita Flynn
- Frank Kelly as Uncle Matt
- David Wilmot as Phelim Spratt
- Pete Postlethwaite as Hubert Flynn
- Ed Byrne as Rudolph
- Geoffrey Palmer as The Doctor
- Kerry Condon as Marietta Flynn
- Andrew Lovern as Pius Flynn
- Niall Toibin as Father Geraldo
- Veronica Duffy as Daisy Farrdell
- Alfie as Mickey the Dog
- Peter Caffrey as Mick the Barman
- Rita Hamill as Estate Woman
- Roxanna Williams as Hopscotch Girl
- Stanley Townsend as Newsreader
- Simon Delaney as Bookies Manager
- Niall O'Brien as Man in Bookies
- John O'Toole as Man in Bookies
- Jer O'Leary as Man in Pub
- Mick Nolan as Man in Pub
- Pat Kinevane as Mr. Reilly
- Mark Doherty as Barrister
- Arthur Riordan as Sergeant Black
- Michael Hayes as Young Garda

== See also ==
- List of American films of 2000
