= John Cowley (actor) =

Irish actor (1923–1998)

John Cowley (8 September 1923 – 13 February 1998) was an Irish actor, best known for his role as paterfamilias, Tom Riordan, in the long-running RTÉ Television drama series, The Riordans.

== Early life and career ==
From a farming background, Cowley was born in Navan, County Meath. He left school at the age of 13 to work on the family farm. Cowley entered the acting profession as a member of one of the touring companies that brought theatre to rural communities in Ireland up until the 1960s. In a bid to escape the impecunious life of a roving actor, he wrote to Laurence Olivier seeking a position at the Old Vic; however, Olivier politely declined.

In 1964, Cowley was chosen to play the part of Tom Riordan in RTÉ's new series, The Riordans. His performance won him a Jacob's Award in 1967 and he continued in the cast until the series ended in 1979. Tom Hickey, who played Tom Riordan's son, Benjy, described Cowley as the "central rock of The Riordans" and "the father of the whole enterprise".

Following The Riordans, Cowley returned to the stage and continued acting up to the end of his life. At the time of his death, he was rehearsing with Galway's Druid Theatre Company for their production of Brian Friel's play, Philadelphia Here I Come. He appeared in a number of feature films, including Jim Sheridan's The Field, an adaptation of John B. Keane's play, and the same director's 1997 film The Boxer.

Cowley was a passionate opponent of cruelty to animals and campaigned vigorously against hare coursing and fox hunting. He was a founder-member of the Irish Council Against Blood Sports.

== Death ==
Cowley was married to the actress, Annie D'Alton, who predeceased him in March 1983. Cowley died at his home in Ardbraccan, aged 74. Their son, Ultan, is a writer and historian.
