= 8.5 Hours =

2008 film

- Official film Poster
- Directed by: Brian Lally
- Written by: Brian Lally
- Produced by: Brian Lally
- Starring: Lynette Callaghan; Victor Burke
- Cinematography: Arthur Mulhern
- Music by: Karim Elmahmoudi
- Distributed by: Breaking Glass Pictures
- Release date: 10 July 2008 (Galway Film Festival)
- Running time: 112 minutes
- Country: Ireland
- Language: English

8.5 Hours is a 2008 Irish drama film written and directed by Brian Lally. The film follows one day in the lives of four Dublin software workers during the final months of Ireland's Celtic Tiger economic boom. The film stars Lynette Callaghan, Art Kearns, Victor Burke and Jonathan Byrne.

== Plot ==
The film is set in 2007, shortly before the end of Ireland's Celtic Tiger period and follows four interconnected narratives centred on Rachel, Eoin, Frank and Tony. Their lives are linked as they all work together in the same office in a small Irish software company.

Rachel, played by Lynette Callaghan, is an ambitious marketing executive who on turning 30 appears to panic about what she perceives as her lack of achievement at a time of great economic opportunity. She becomes obsessed with an overpriced apartment in Dublin's prestigious Ballsbridge area and after a bruising opening scene where her boyfriend ends their relationship because she had a drunken one night stand, Rachel is determined to buy the apartment on her own at whatever cost. All closing bids for the apartment must be in by the end of the day so for most of the film, Rachel is preoccupied with a race-against-time to raise her salary to get a mortgage she can not afford. As she runs out of time, she becomes increasingly desperate and irrational and ends up blackmailing her boss to give her an unreasonable pay rise.

Eoin, played by Victor Burke is a computer programmer who is about to marry his fiancée Lisa (played by Clodagh Reid). Initially he appears to be a very ordinary character who is becoming stressed about his impending marriage due to its spiraling costs as Lisa makes increasingly extravagant wedding arrangements. However, as this story unfolds, Eoin's character is revealed to have a history of bisexual encounters with other men. Simon, a handsome French man (played by French actor Frederic Ledoux) who seduced Eoin at a party the previous year, unexpectedly resurfaces and wants to meet Eoin that day for a coffee. The meeting with Simon puts Eoin on the spot as Simon confronts him about marrying and whether he prefers boys or girls.

Frank, played by Art Kearns is a senior computer programmer in the company. His story is revealed quite late in the film. For most of the early section, he appears to be a grumpy, angry character who has some issue with his wife, and away from the eyes of his fellow workers, vents his anger by smashing a computer printer to pieces with his bare hands. He does not communicate much with the other characters and most of his story is internal and revealed through flashbacks as he mulls over the past. Eventually, it is revealed that he is troubled over his wife's uncomfortable fondness with his best friend David (played by Brendan McCormack).

Tony, played by Jonathan Byrne is a fun-loving, cocaine-sniffing womaniser who casually shambles through his job in the software company. His story opens with a bawdy bedroom romp but as he can not even get the girl's name right, that soon ends in a row. Arriving late at work, Tony appears to be a happy-go-lucky type who never takes things too seriously. However, he is troubled by some strange, puzzling letters he has been receiving and after one is left at work, he visits a church to meet a bizarre old woman called Maggie (Geraldine Plunkett). She reveals that she is the mother of a girl he had an affair with the previous year who killed herself shortly afterwards. She accuses him of treating her badly. Tony denies the claims and storms off. For the rest of the day, Tony is deeply troubled by memories of not returning the girl's calls when she was clearly distressed and in the final scene of the film, Maggie shows up at his apartment to tell him a piece of very disturbing news.

== Cast ==
- Lynette Callaghan as Rachel.
- Art Kearns as Frank.
- Jonathan Byrne as Tony.
- Victor Burke as Eoin.
- Geraldine Plunkett as Maggie.
- Tom O'Sullivan as Martin.
- Gary Egan as Ian.

== Reception ==
The critical response to 8.5 Hours was overwhelmingly negative. On its cinema release in Ireland, the film received a harsh review from The Irish Independent which appeared appalled by the film's depiction of the Dublin middle class behaving badly, and wrote that the film was "poisonous to the cause of Irish tourism".
