= The Green Marker Scare =

- Title card
- Directed by: Graham Jones
- Starring: Ali Coffey; Cathal O'Donnell; Frank McGovern; Mark Aalben; Louise Marie Kerr; Sarah O'Donnell; John Wright; Ally Ní Chiaráin; Jose Naghmar
- Edited by: Cary Uiow
- Music by: John Wright
- Production company: Old Japanese Daytime Soapstars
- Release date: 22 October 2012
- Running time: 70 minutes
- Country: Ireland
- Language: English
- Budget: €52,000

The Green Marker Scare is a 2012 horror film from the Irish director Graham Jones that is animated by children. It premiered in November 2012 on YouTube.

== Plot summary ==
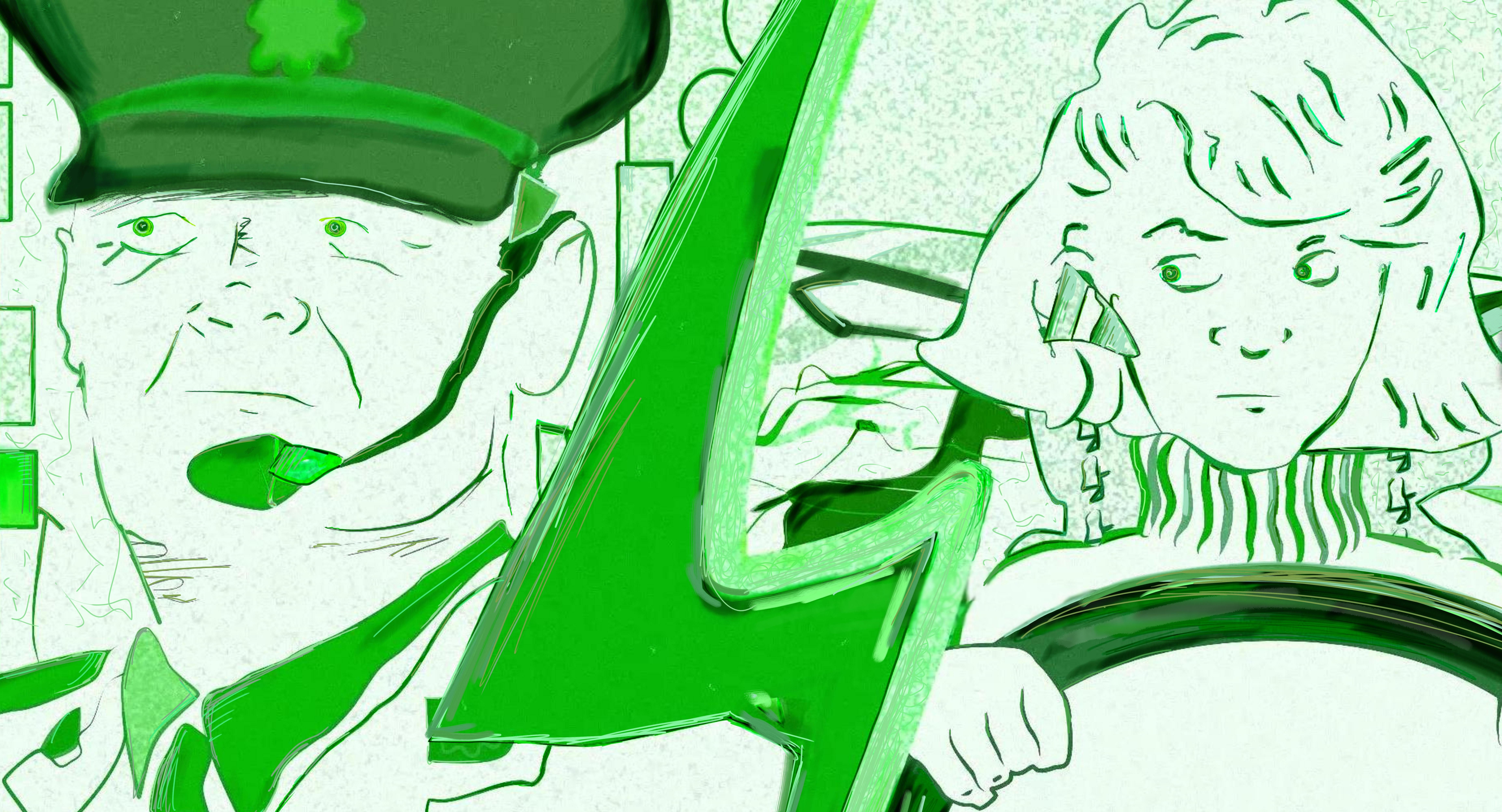
Superintendent O'Toole and Noreen attempt to solve her father's murder

A young Irish girl detective named Noreen comes across Satanic ritual abuse taking place in the small country town where she lives.

== Production ==
The film was animated by children from Cork, Limerick and Tipperary. Every child had to draw a different character or environment. The children did know that they were part of a horror film's production, and the rest of the film's content was not shown to them. Jones was afraid at first to have children animate the film and he wanted it to "be like a moving children’s picture". Despite being animated by children, the film is not aimed at them.

Jones made a twist to the girl detective genre, saying, "But instead of giving her harmless art burglars to deal with, throw her the worst thing imaginable and watch her mind grapple with it. The penny still hasn’t dropped about Ritual Abuse in the 21st century and that made it interesting for a naive cartoon character to stumble across."

It premiered in November 2012 on YouTube. Jones wanted the film to be released online in its entirety in order for people to be able to share it with others and to not have outside commercial interests. The director stated that he does not create films for money and does not want them to be controlled by outside influences.

== Reception ==
A review on Horrornews says, "The Green Marker Scare may not be for everyone, and for different reasons. I can’t stress enough that the subject matter is not for children and could be disturbing to some adults. Others may just find the whole thing ridiculous and the animation style hard to watch. But I have to admit that once it got going, the film is fairly engaging." The film was reviewed by Hot Press.
