= Rainy in Glenageary =

Irish documentary

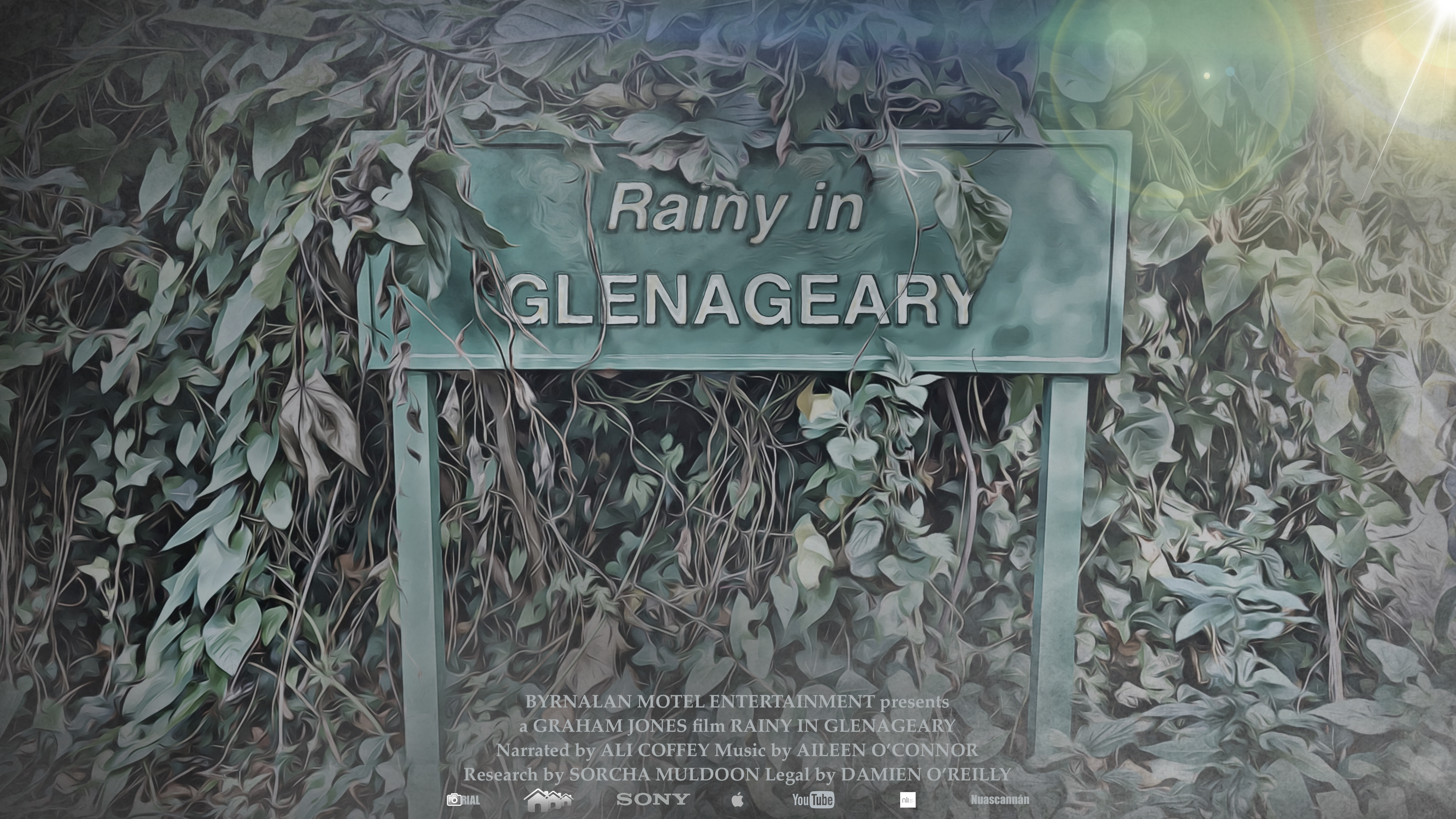
- Directed by: Graham Jones
- Release date: 16 April 2019
- Running time: 95 minutes
- Country: Ireland
- Language: English

Rainy in Glenageary is an Irish 2019 feature documentary from Irish director Graham Jones about the unsolved 1999 murder of Dublin schoolgirl Raonaid Murray.
