= Fudge 44 =

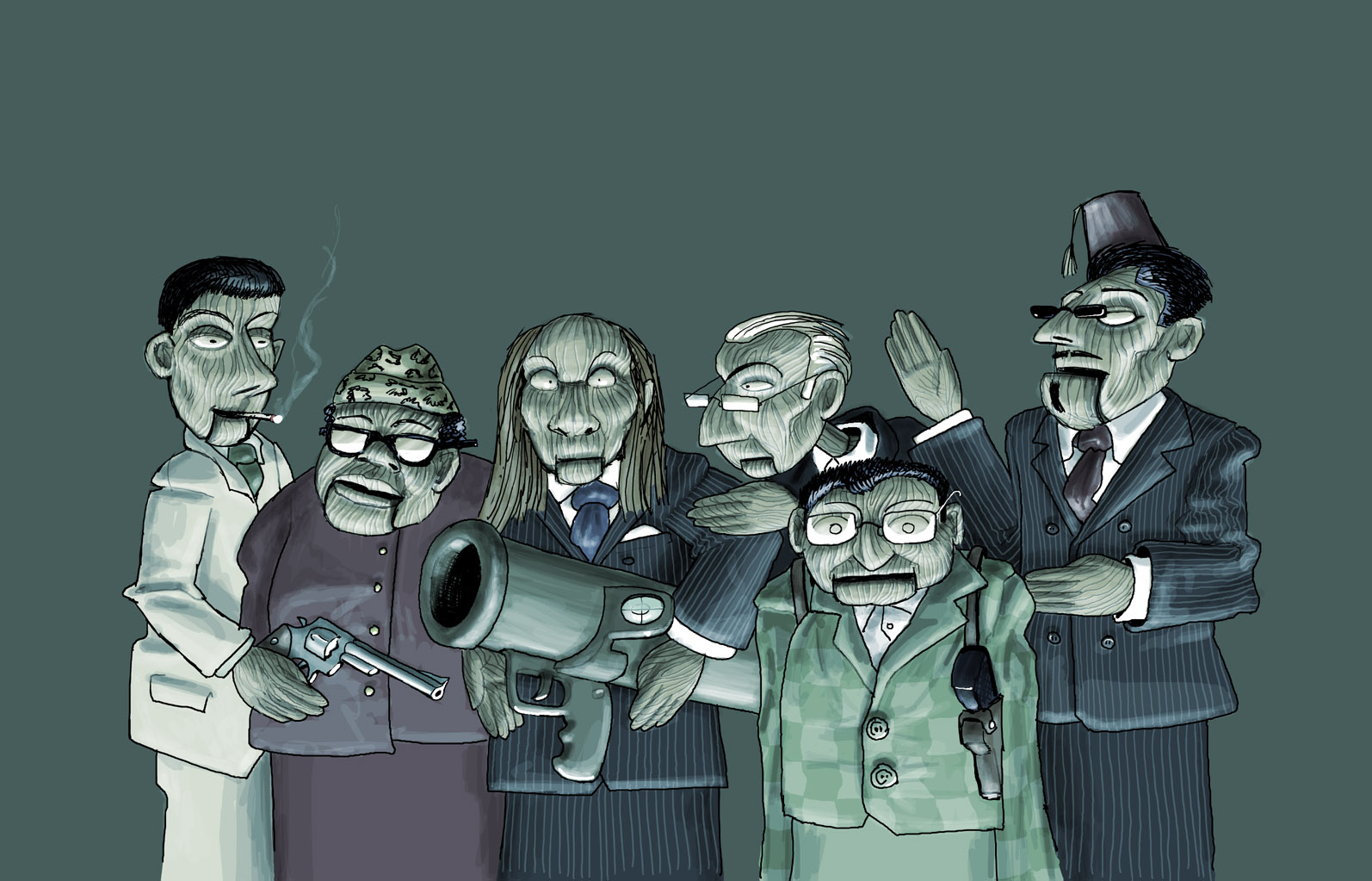
- The Puppets from Fudge 44, Helmut Kollars illustration
- Directed by: Graham Jones
- Written by: Graham Jones; Garret Sexton
- Produced by: José Naghmar
- Starring: Terauchi Aritomo; Hatoyama Ichiro; Ito Keigo; Miki Kiyotaka; Sakichi Masatake; Yudia Masatake; Ohira Masayoshi; Yonai Mitsumasa; Yutaka Takashi; Kuroda Takeo; Katsura Taro; Yamagata Toyoda; Toshiki Uchimura; Toyoda Uchimura
- Cinematography: John G Maarse
- Edited by: Joe Sharngam
- Distributed by: Marc's Floor
- Release date: 2005
- Running time: 71 minutes
- Country: Ireland
- Language: Japanese with false English translation

Fudge 44 is a 2005 Irish film directed by Graham Jones. It is a mockumentary about six puppets in an insolvent Tokyo children's puppet theatre who locals believe came to life and robbed a nearby bank to avoid being put out of business.

The Irish premiere took place on June 24, 2006, at the 7th International Darklight Festival, the Canadian premiere at RHIFF in Toronto on June 20 where it won an experimental award and the World Premiere at The Delray Beach Film Festival in Florida on March 10. The film was also winner of the 2007 Most Original Film Award at The Backseat Film Festival in Philadelphia and nominated for a 2006 Irish Digital Media Award.
