= The Ballroom of Romance =

Irish television film (1982)

- Cover of the October 1982 RTÉ Guide with image from The Ballroom of Romance
- Based on: "The Ballroom of Romance" by William Trevor
- Directed by: Pat O'Connor
- Starring: Brenda Fricker; John Kavanagh; Cyril Cusack; Brid Brennan; Mick Lally; Joe Pilkington; Ingrid Craigie
- Country of origin: Ireland
- Original language: English

Production
- Producer: Kenith Trodd
- Cinematography: Nat Crosby
- Editor: Maurice Healy
- Running time: 52 minutes

Original release
- Network: RTÉ
- Release: October 31, 1982

The Ballroom of Romance is a Irish-British 1982 television film directed by Pat O'Connor based on a short story by William Trevor. It won the British Academy Television Award for Best Single Drama.

== Plot ==
In County Leitrim in the 1950s, Bridie has been attending the local dance hall for years in the hopes of finding a husband who can help work her family's farm. Now surrounded by younger women at the dances, she comes to the realisation that all the men of her generation have emigrated or have been spoken for, and her only remaining hope for marriage is with the alcoholic Bowser Egan.

== Cast ==
Actor	Role
Brenda Fricker	Bridie
John Kavanagh	Bowser Egan
Mick Lally	Dano Ryan
Niall Toibin	Eyes Horgan
Joe Pilkington	Tim Daly
Brid Brennan	Patty Byrne
Ingrid Craigie	Eenie Mackie
Cyril Cusack	Mr. Dwyer

== Background and production ==
The Ballroom of Romance was based on a short story by William Trevor set in County Leitrim, Ireland. The film was shot on location in Ballycroy, County Mayo, as by 1982 the ballroom which William Trevor had originally written about had been modernised and no longer resembled a dance hall typical of 1950s Ireland.

Almost all of the production personnel involved in the BBC/RTÉ co-production The Ballroom of Romance came from the BBC, along with Producer Kenith Trodd.

The banner seen at the dance, "Happy Homes for Ireland and for God", was taken from a real banner that O'Connor remembered from his youth.

The RTÉ participation in the production consisted of Director Pat O’Connor and Editor Maurice Healy. The post-production (Editing) was carried out at RTÉ in Dublin, in early 1982.

Sound mixing was done at BBC Lime Grove Studios in Shepherd’s Bush, London. Rank Film Laboratories in Denham supplied the film prints for the television broadcasts.

Extras were from the locals from within the Ballycroy area.

The film premiered on RTÉ 1 on 31 October 1982.

== Reception ==
The film is considered a classic. Bob Geldof described The Ballroom of Romance as his favourite Irish film, "full of that empty, sad despair and hopelessness that is in the character, as evidenced in drink, music, Catholicism, desperate pursuit of ‘the craic’ and dangerously overwrought politics."

In 2012, it was the subject of a documentary on RTÉ Radio 1, A Backwards Glance At The Ballroom of Romance.

In 2019, it was shown at the Irish Film Institute, Sunniva O’Flynn calling it "a perfectly observed evocation of the desolation and despair of Irish country life in the 1950s."

In 2022, an exhibition of behind-the-scenes images from the film went on show at Linenhall Arts Centre, Castlebar.

Scholarly analysis has noted that the film was produced at a time when Ireland was beginning to become a wealthy, industrialised nation, as European Economic Community membership brought factories and development. Luke Gibbons wrote that it "provided a focus for the reassuring belief that the fifties were no longer with us... Viewers could confront the harsh realities of poverty, emigration, sexual repression and the enforced domestication of women, secure in the knowledge that ‘The factory was coming to town.’"
