= Bracken (TV series) =

- Genre: Soap opera
- Created by: Wesley Burrowes
- Directed by: Noel O'Briain
- Starring: Gabriel Byrne; Niall Tóibín; Joe Lynch; Mick Lally
- Country of origin: Ireland
- Original language: English
- No. of seasons: 2
- No. of episodes: 12

Production
- Production location: County Wicklow
- Running time: 42–55 minutes

Original release
- Network: RTÉ 1
- Release: 6 January 1980 – 1 January 1982

Related
- The Riordans; Glenroe

Bracken is a television drama serial broadcast from 1980 to 1982 on RTÉ 1 in Ireland, depicting rural life in and around County Wicklow. Created and written by Wesley Burrowes, it starred Gabriel Byrne and Niall Tóibín.

The show is chiefly known for being the link between two long standing RTÉ series, in that Gabriel Byrne's character, Pat Barry, had first appeared in The Riordans, towards the end of that show's run. The characters of Dinny and Miley Byrne, played by Joe Lynch and Mick Lally, first appeared on this series, they were later to become the central stars of Glenroe. Each of the three series were created by Wesley Burrowes.

== Cast ==
- Gabriel Byrne as Pat Barry
- Niall Tóibín as Edward Daly
- Joe Lynch as Dinny Byrne
- Sean Lawlor as Peter Thompson
- Mick Lally as Miley Byrne
- Fiona Victory as Louise Daly
- Dana Wynter as Jill Daly
- Jim Fitzgerald as Barney Kenny
