= Tom Hickey (actor) =

Irish actor (1944–2021)

- Born: 1944; Kildare, Ireland
- Died: 1 May 2021 (aged 77)
- Occupation: Actor
- Years active: 1963–2021

Tom Hickey (1944 – 1 May 2021) was an Irish actor who appeared on stage and screen in a career that began in the early 1960s. He was best known for playing Benjy Riordan in the long-running television series, The Riordans.

== Early life ==
Born in Kildare, Hickey began his career in 1963 at Deirdre O'Connell's Stanislavski Studio in Dublin where he trained in Stanislavski's system of acting. He said that he saw his choice of profession as a "vocation", having decided to become an actor when he was five or six years old.

== Television ==
In 1965, Hickey joined the cast of RTÉ television's new rural drama series, The Riordans. He went on to play the part of Benjy Riordan in the successful serial for the next sixteen years.

In 2001, he made a rare venture into television advertising with his appearances in a series of commercials for Club, a soft drink. The first of these was directed by Declan Lowney, the director of Father Ted. Lowney also directed Moone Boy, a Sky television series in which Hickey played Granddad Joe.

== Stage ==
On stage, Hickey favoured parts in the work of modern Irish playwrights such as Tom Murphy, Frank McGuinness, Bernard Farrell, and Marina Carr. In the early 1980s, the playwright Tom MacIntyre asked him to play the lead role in his adaptation of Patrick Kavanagh's poem The Great Hunger. Following the success of that collaboration, he has become an acclaimed interpreter of MacIntyre's work, in such plays as Rise Up Lovely Sweeney, The Gallant John Joe and What Happened Bridgie Cleary.

== Cinema ==
As a character actor, Hickey appeared in numerous films, including My Left Foot, Fools of Fortune, Gothic, Inside I'm Dancing, Stella Days, Breakfast on Pluto, and Possession. He was also cast in two of director Lenny Abrahamson's films: Garage and What Richard Did.

== Personal life ==
In 2013, Hickey was diagnosed with Parkinson's disease. During an interview on The Marian Finucane Show on 11 April 2015, he spoke of his determination to continue acting despite the onset of this condition.

Hickey died on Saturday, 1 May 2021 at age 77, with tributes paid by President Michael D. Higgins.
