= Glenroe =

Irish TV drama series (1983–2001)

- Also known as: Gleann Rua
- Genre: Soap opera
- Created by: Wesley Burrowes
- Written by: Wesley Burrowes, Tommy McArdle
- Directed by: Alan Robinson (Director & Producer), David McKenna (Head of Broadcasting Compliance, RTÉ)
- Starring: Mick Lally, Joe Lynch, Mary McEvoy, Emmet Bergin, Geraldine Plunkett, Robert Carrickford, Maureen Toal, Alan Stanford
- Theme music composer: Jim Lockhart
- Opening theme: "Cuaichín Ghleann Néifinn"
- Country of origin: Ireland
- Original language: English
- No. of seasons: 18

Production
- Running time: 30 minutes

Original release
- Network: RTÉ One
- Release: 11 September 1983 – 6 May 2001

Related
- Bracken; The Riordans

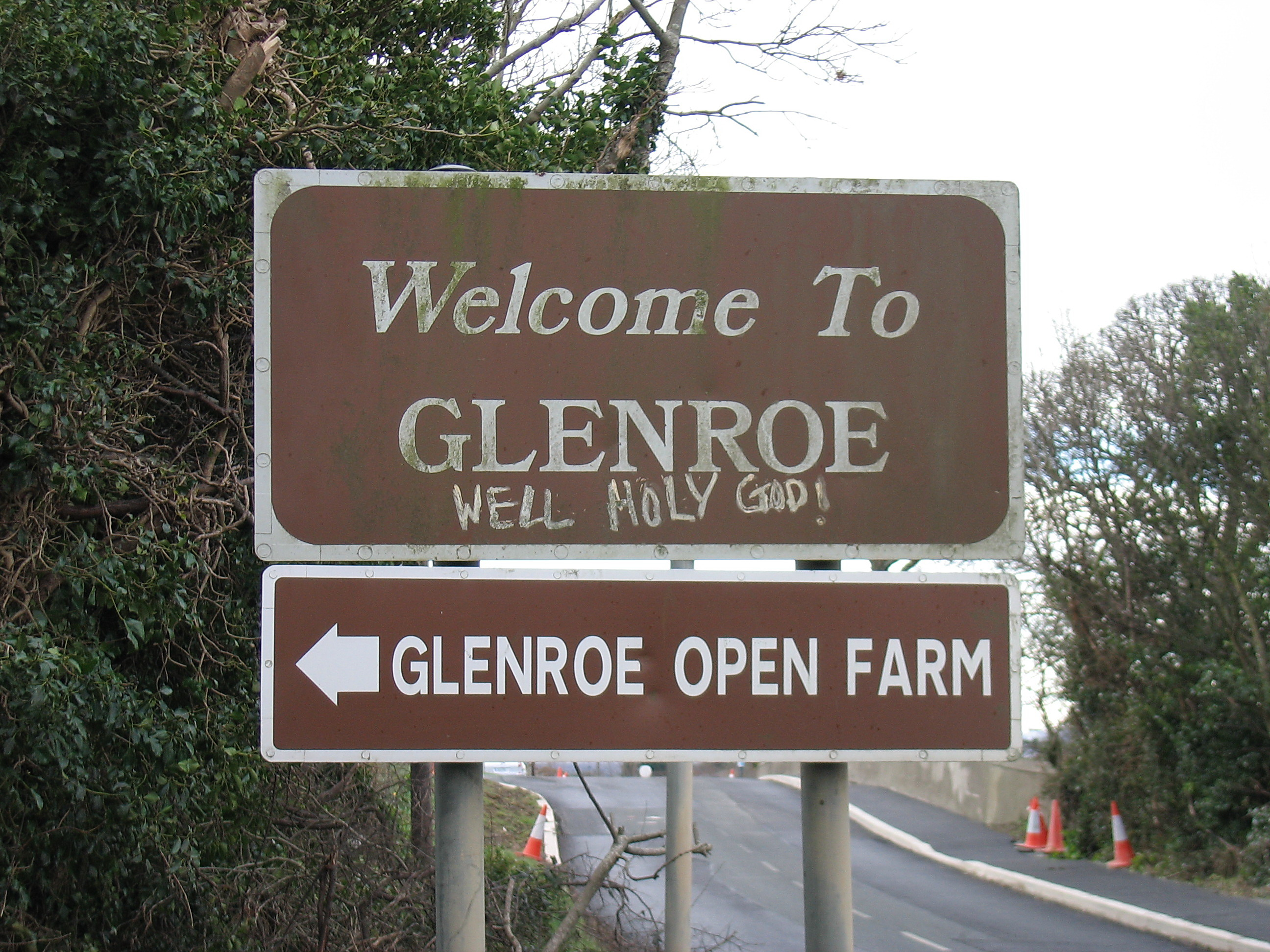
A sign on the road approaching Kilcoole

Glenroe is an Irish television soap opera broadcast on RTÉ One for 18 years between September 1983 and May 2001. Glenroe was centred on the lives of the people living in the fictional rural village of the same name in County Wicklow. The real-life village of Kilcoole was used to film the series. The series was also filmed in studio at RTÉ and in various other locations when directors saw fit.

The show was a spin-off from Bracken — an RTÉ drama that was broadcast from 1980 to 1982, which was itself spun off from The Riordans — another RTÉ drama that was broadcast from 1965 to 1979. Glenroe was broadcast, generally from September to May, each Sunday at 8:30 pm. It was created, and written for much of its run, by Wesley Burrowes, and later by various other directors and producers including Paul Cusack, Alan Robinson and Tommy McArdle. Glenroe was the first show to be subtitled by RTÉ, with a broadcast in 1991 starting the station's subtitling policy.

The main protagonists were the Byrne and McDermott/Moran families, related by the marriage of Miley Byrne to Biddy McDermott. Other important characters included Teasy McDaid, the proprietor of the local pub; Tim Devereux and George Black (the Roman Catholic priest and the Church of Ireland Rector of the village respectively); Fidelma Kelly, a cousin of Biddy; Blackie Connors; George Manning; and Stephen Brennan.

== Title sequence ==
=== Imagery ===
Glenroe was noted for its original title sequence, which featured the words "Gleann Rua" in Gaelic script morphing into "Glenroe" over a series of rural images. The original title sequence was used from the 1983/84 series to the end of the 1992/93 series, and was replaced with a more up-to-date title sequence at the start of the 1993/94 series.

Jarlath Hayes (1924–2001), master Irish typographer and designer, "who gave his best years as a man of letters working within Irish publishing…drew his own type, Tuam Uncial…it became familiar to a generation of Glenroe viewers on RTÉ television where it featured in the credits".

=== Theme tune ===
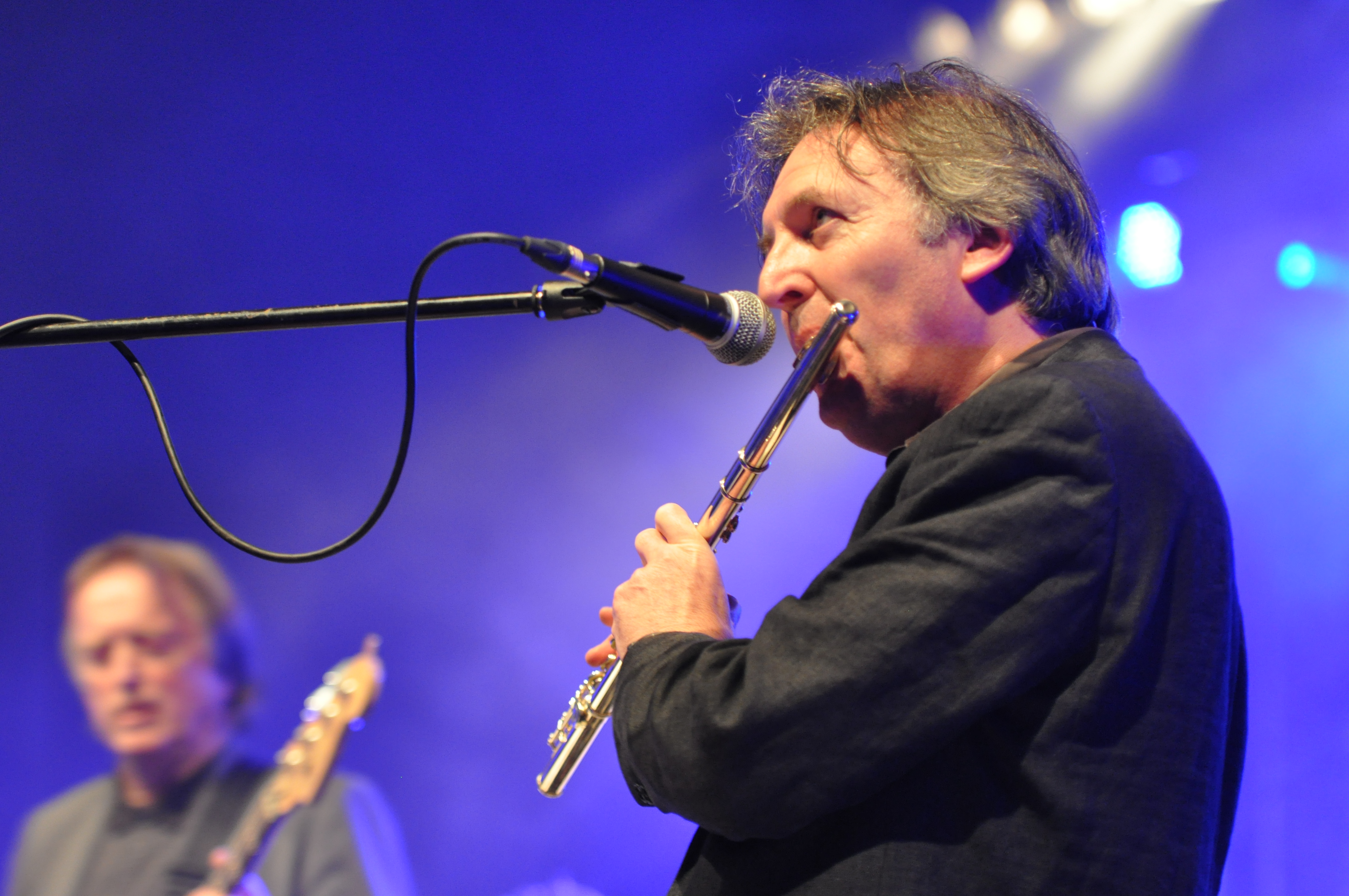
Jim Lockhart

Glenroe's theme tune was that of a traditional Irish song called "Cuaichín Ghleann Néifinn" and was arranged by Jim Lockhart of Horslips. The original version was used from the 1983/84 series to the end of the 1992/93 series. A newly recorded version, at the start of the 1993/94 series, along with changes to the title sequence was requested by TV, film, theatre producer and director, the late Art Ó Briain and was arranged and performed by Máire Breatnach featuring Cormac Breatnach on Whistle.

== Setting and characters ==
The central focus of Glenroe is the fictional rural area of the programme's title, located in County Wicklow. The setting is an area consisting of a collection of farms, small village, period house and other rural locations. The programme focuses on a cast of characters living near the village. The main characters are Miley Byrne and Biddy McDermott, whose courtship and marriage form the centerpiece of the action during the early years. Their parents also feature heavily in the storylines. Miley's father Dinny Byrne is a chancer and Biddy's mother, who has been widowed early in the series, conducts a long-running relationship with Dick Moran, the local solicitor. Dick occasionally has other affairs, such as that with Terry Kileen. A number of themes are explored throughout the series from relationships, facing tragedy and other life challenges. While the main theme is drama, there are elements of comedy evident, e.g. the interactions between two central characters of Miley Byrne and his father Dinny Byrne (continuing their character portrayals from Bracken).

| Character | Actor | Duration |
|---|---|---|
| Dinny Byrne | Joe Lynch | 1983–2000 |
| Miley Byrne | Mick Lally | 1983–2001 |
| Biddy Byrne | Mary McEvoy | 1983–2000 |
| Dick Moran | Emmet Bergin | 1983–2001 |
| Mary McDermott-Moran | Geraldine Plunkett | 1983–2001 |
| Stephen Brennan | Robert Carrickford | 1983–2001 |
| Father Tim Devereux | Dónall Farmer | 1987–2001 |
| Teasy McDaid | Maureen Toal | 1987–2001 |
| Mary-Ann Byrne | Grace Barry | 1990–2001 |
| George Manning | Alan Stanford | 1984-1992 |
| Michelle Haughey | Isobel Mahon | |
| Fr. Tracey | Philip O'Sullivan | 1999 |
| Blackie Connors | Liam Heffernan | 1992–2001 |
| Nellie Connors | Moira Deady | |
| Sergeant Jim Roche | Paul Bennett | |
| Fidelma Kelly | Eunice MacMenamin | 1995 |
| Aileen Synnot | Laura Ellen Howard | 1998–2000 |
| Ann Synnot | Noelle Brown | 2000 |
| Nuala Brennan née Maher | Carmel Callan | |
| Kevin Haughey | Liam Carney | |
| Sylvie Dolan | David Kelly | |
| Uncle Peter | Cyril Cusack | |
| Dr. David Hanlon | Mario Rosenstock | |
| Terry Kileen | Kate Thompson | |
| Rev. George Black | Enda Oates | |
| Paudie Doyle | David Boyd | 1999 |
| Dan Reilly | Joe McKinney | 1998–2001 |
| Catherine Daly | Louise Kerr | |
| Conor Sheehy | Timothy Murphy | |
| Fiona March Black | Lucy Vigne-Welch | |
| Bernadette Timlin | Barbara Griffin | |
| Mynah Timlin | Eileen Colgan | |
| Joseph Timlin | John-Paul McGarry | |
| Jennifer Crosby | Rachel Pilkington | |
| Hoppy Crosby | Glenn Mulhern/Lochlann Ó Mearáin | 1999–2000 |
| Venetia Crosby | Maria McDermottroe | 1995–2000 |
| Regina Crosby | Eva Birthistle | 1995–1998 |
| Albert Crosby | Peter Caffrey | 1995–2000 |
| Deirdre Cooney | Sinéad Flynn | 1999 |
| Nessa McIntyre | Síle Nic Chonaonaigh | 1999 |
| Conor Sheehy | Timothy V. Murphy | 1995 |
| Madge O'Regan | Ronnie Masterson | 1983 |
| Tommy Murphy | John Finnegan | 1997–1998 |
| Lizzie O'Driscoll | Maire Hastings | 1999–2000 |
| Maurice Nolan | Frank Kelly | 1999–2001 |
| Lucy Reilly | Cathy Belton | 1999 |
| Collette Daly | Honor Heffernan | 1999 |
| Johnny Connors | Michael Collins | 1995–1999 |
| Peggy Connors | Linda McDonnell | 1999 |
| Julia Connors | Miriam Brady | |
| Francie Donnelly | Frank O'Sullivan | 1999 |
| Mike O'Shea | Bryan Murray | 1999 |

=== Origins ===
Glenroe, as a story, had origins in two previous shows, The Riordans and Bracken. The three productions were the brainchildren of Wesley Burrowes.

== Narratives ==
=== Affairs of the heart ===
Michael Judge, Irish playwright who wrote scripts for Glenroe, published Glenroe: Stories from the RTÉ series created by Wesley Burrowes through Gill & MacMillan in 1990. The book relays the intricate relational beginnings of what would become the soap's linear storyline which would span 18 years. In the beginning two contrasting storylines of the amorous kind were present: that of the wholesome Biddy and Miley, contrasted with the risqué Mary and Dick.

The blow-ins, as they are referred to by the book, are the Byrnes, who arrive in Glenroe from the mountains. The character of Biddy is central to the story. Her parents, Mary and Michael MacDermott, are married and dissimilar in age bracket. Biddy becomes interested in one of the blow-ins. Biddy's first comment on Miley is "he looked a bit of a gom".

The relationship between Dick and Mary emerges as they have a secret love affair, Mary being frustrated in her relationship with Michael MacDermott whom she married out of obligation. The love affair would blossom through secret getaways, with the couple once trying to arrange to be together under the guise of getting away to a Bridge Congress. In the book, when Michael discovers his wife is having an affair, he strikes her.

Widower Dinny Byrne found love after Teasy McDaid's arrival in Glenroe in 1987, with her having been left the local pub by her recently deceased uncle. They were married on 11 September 1994, with Teasy moving into Dinny's thatched farm cottage. Shortly after, Teasy's previous husband, Sylvie Dolan, turned up. Sylvie had disappeared years before and had faked his own death in Australia, sending a fake death certificate to Teasy. He demanded a share of the life insurance payment Teasy had received in exchange for his disappearing again. Teasy responded that she would return the money to the insurance company. Dinny and Teasy stayed together until Dinny's death in 2000.

=== Religion ===
The subject of religion featured in the programme throughout the series. One storyline showed how Miley, a devout Roman Catholic, believed his daughter, who had been critically ill with meningitis, was saved by prayer and divine intervention, while Biddy, who rarely went to Mass, credited the doctor with her recovery. The parish priest, Father Tim Devereaux, was upset that nobody was listening to his pastoral advice, and retired to embark on a round-the-world cruise with Shirley Manning, a widow of Protestant and Jewish ancestry.

Another storyline evoked the question: How much money should be spent on a First Communion dress?

=== Travelling community ===
In the fourteenth season, Tommy McArdle, the show's producer, began to explore the topic of Irish Travellers in greater depth. However, the topic had not been absent from the programme before this. The character of Blackie Conors is a member of the Irish travelling community.

Blackie and Dinny

Another narrative which revolved around the topic of the Travelling community is Miley and Biddy trying to evict a family of travellers who park their caravan on the edge of the farm. When two pet rabbits disappear, the community suspects the travellers have eaten them.

In a later episode, Anne Synnot reveals to her daughter Aileen that she is the product of her mother's affair with a Traveller. Previous to this revelation, Aileen was shown in conversation with Joseph Timlin at the bar in the Molly Malone, using the derogatory term "knacker" referring to the character Francie Donnelly.

== Cancellation ==
In 2000, it seemed the soap was going into inevitable decline. If the actors who played the main characters and whose appearance and likeness were so intrinsic to the beginnings and the storyline of the soap were leaving, it would cease to be Glenroe. Through a press release the public learned in May 2000 that Joe Lynch, who played Dinny, was to leave. Kevin O'Sullivan wrote, "RTÉ last night confirmed his departure after 20 years, taking into account Glenroe from its beginning and its precursor Bracken. 'No reason was given.' A statement said the 75-year-old actor had made the decision."

On 19 January 2001, despite claims four years previously that it could run for another ten years, RTÉ announced that Glenroe was to end after eighteen series. The final episode of the soap was to be broadcast the following May. The RTÉ Director of Television, Cathal Goan, said it had been clear for some time that Glenroe was "coming to the end of its natural life". On 1 August of that year, Joe Lynch, who played Dinny, died at the age of 76.

The character of Biddy had been killed off in a car accident, and the actor Joe Lynch had died. The Irish Times published irreverent, tongue-in cheek-headlines about the ending of a soap and characters who were fair game for mockery and satire.

John Boland, in the Irish Independent in 2001, criticised the RTÉ Guide's coverage and lack of critique or analysis about the end of Glenroe: "a supposedly loved friend was expiring after 18 years and you're supposed to feel something about that, aren't you? Then you realised that the programme had been expiring for years and years, and that this final death throe was merely embarrassing in its lateness."

Wesley Burrowes in his article for The Irish Times's Arts section on 27 January 2001, discussed the beginnings of Glenroe as a story. This started with The Riordans, after which RTÉ asked Burrowes to write a spin-off which became Bracken, and then on to Glenroe where the characters Miley and Dinny Byrne were carried forward to the slightly more urban setting of Glenroe (set in Kilcoole, Wicklow). Glenroe evolved around Miley and Biddy's love affair, with Miley admiring Biddy for her farming expertise.

Burrowes articulated the problems around the decline of the series, explaining how both ratings and frequency were both guiding factors in the show's ascent and then demise. He drew correlations between Coronation Street and EastEnders, which both competed for frequency and ratings at the BBC, and then explained "the more often a programme appears in a week. the higher its rating goes... Glenroe has been left as the only soap in the archipelago struggling along on one slot a week".

After Burrowes left the crew of Glenroe, he returned to write one New Year's episode, having been asked to do so by Paul Cusack, the show's successive producer. He concluded his piece in The Irish Times's Arts section: "let there be no whinging or moaning at the bar for Glenroe, which, for 18 years, gave good neighbours to a generation. All who were part of that have cause for pride!"

The last episode of Glenroe was transmitted on 6 May 2001, attracting an audience of 591,000 viewers. Its place in the Sunday evening schedule was taken by On Home Ground, a drama series set at a fictional rural GAA club, which ran for two seasons from September 2001 until May 2003.

Geraldine Plunkett starred in the first two seasons of The Clinic, which ran for seven seasons also on Sunday nights. Actor Mick Lally went on to join the cast of the TG4 drama series Ros na Rún in 2008.

Mary McEvoy has continued to work as an actor and has campaigned on mental health issues.

== Music ==
In Glenroe, the book, when Miley gets a delivery of a parcel and is asked about the contents, the following exchange takes place:

…"it's me jingle," he said. "your what?" "me diddle-eye-do," said Miley. "it's either Dr Zhivago or the Blue Danube".

A song from the series, "The By-road to Glenroe", performed in character by Mick Lally, was released as a single in Ireland in 1990, featuring the Jim Lockhart version of the theme tune as its B-side, and reached number 1 in the Irish Singles Chart on 5 April 1990.

During the late 1990s, new characters were introduced including a character called Paudie, who started a band. They practiced in the local parish hall, and were visited by Fr. Tracey on occasion. The band, made up of the characters Paudie Doyle, Aileen Synnot, Joseph Timlin, Catherine Daly, and Deirdre Cooney, performed in The Molly Malone bar, shot on location in RTÉ, in a Christmas episode in the late 90s. Singer Honor Heffernan sang in this episode. The song performed by the band of youths was written by David Boyd, who played Paudie Doyle, and contained the lyrics: "When the love is real, that's the way it feels | You know the Music's louder, you know the air is sweet, and you can't stop from dancing every time you move your feet, cos when the love is real, that's the way it feels…you can smile on the inside." The character Paudie played the keyboard in the band. The character Aileen Synnot played the guitar surrounded by singing bandmates in one episode, which showed band practice being interrupted by Fr. Tracey.

== Political quotes ==
The last decade of the 20th century, and the first two decades of the 21st century, were significant times in Ireland. Glenroe has cropped up in Dáil debates over these years, as politicians have seen it as an Irish cultural icon which was broadcast through the influential medium of television.

In 1993 Proinsias De Rossa and John Deasy mentioned Glenroe in a discussion about the quality and content of Irish-made TV drama.

In 1998 Michael Ring, speaking about the influence of television on young people, said, "it is important that we keep control of Irish airwaves. It is fine to see Sky television available, but it must be controlled."

In January 2003, almost two years after the cessation of Glenroe, Irish Actors Equity made a presentation in the Joint Committee on Social and Family Affairs Debate. Robert Carrickford, actor and member of the executive committee of Irish Actors Equity was present. Attendees discussed the precarious nature of the acting profession. Willie Penrose, who chaired the meeting, said;

The first thing I wish to do is dispel the myth surrounding the profession. There is a perception that everybody is doing well. I also come from a profession that suffers from the same syndrome. The top 10% in my profession might be doing extremely well, 40% just about survive and the other 50% are struggling. Perhaps the percentages are different in our guests' profession, but it is easy for it to become a media-led view that everybody is very well off and it is all glamour and glitz.

Michael Ring, at the same meeting, said, "Politicians are like actors... We cannot have just anybody telling social welfare services that they are an actor. There are many good actors out there that we have to deal with and judge every single day. Some of them would do well if they were on Glenroe and they would be well able to convince people they were in the profession."

Later that year Paul Kehoe lamented the lack of choice for Irish viewers since the demise of Glenroe: "Not enough programmes such as Fair City are being made in Ireland. Since Glenroe was cancelled, people are obliged to watch EastEnders, Neighbours, Coronation Street or whatever."

== UK Broadcast ==
Glenroe was screened on 13 of the 15 ITV regional franchises, with most starting to screen the series twice weekly from June 1984 until summer 1985. Central and LWT never screened the series, STV dropped the series by end of the summer of 1984, while Border continued until 1986. UTV continued to screen the full series.

In December 1995, as part of a soap opera-themed weekend, Channel 4 broadcast an episode of Glenroe.

Glenroe was also shown on the Tara Television network in the United Kingdom via cable and SkyDigital from 1997 to the closure of the station in 2002. Classic episodes were shown in the daytime and repeated in the early evenings on weekdays, and current episodes were simulcast with RTÉ on Sunday evenings during each season. Tara had reached the 1992/93 season of Glenroe at the time of the station's closure.

== Advertising ==
Glenroe was intersected halfway through by advertisements and was very much an advertisers' medium, cushioning big brand advertisements at the peak time of Sunday evening. Glenroe reached an even wider audience after being picked up and shown further afield on cable TV. Glenroe, in its totality, is an advertisement in itself, for Ireland, for "Irishness" or perhaps for an Ireland that once was. Michael Ring, politician, recently talked about an Internet TV channel – Irish TV – which sells/promotes/advertises Ireland.

Glenroe was the subject of controversy with regard to actors' rights to avail of other commercial work during their contracted periods with the broadcaster. In 1990 RTÉ prohibited soap actors from portraying their characters for advertising purposes. The Irish Times ran an article titled "RTÉ forbids 'soap star' ads." It read: "Actors in RTÉ soap operas such as Glenroe and Fair City will be prevented from portraying well-known characters... for advertising purposes this year... In effect the ban will mean that actors such as Mick Lally and Joe Lynch will be free to earn money from advertisements and from supermarket openings as longs as they do not portray the characters they play in the Glenroe series."

Three days previous another article stated: "the matter was resolved... The Characters are the property of RTÉ".

=== Cable television – the digital dawn ===
In 1995 RTÉ made a ten-year deal with a company called Celtic Vision, which according to its Dundalk-born founder Robert Mathews,

"should be seen as "a 24-hour 'infomercial' for all things Irish" which can boost Irish-American trade, increase the numbers of American tourists visiting Ireland and move the US vision of Ireland away from shamrocks and leprachauns towards a more realistic representation of the modern Ireland ... The Late Late, which the company has secured as part of a 10-year deal with RTÉ, is now a highlight of the CelticVision schedule and runs alongside Glenroe, Fair City, and a range of Gaelic sports... Mr Mathews raised $1.5 million... mainly through a number of private placings with private investors in Ireland and the United States."

Through challenges garnering funding in the early days, the company was still in operation in 2000, seemingly dissolving in 2003.

In 1995 in The European, journalist David Short wrote, "Soap operas, first devised by companies such as Procter & Gamble to sell their products, are now seen everywhere in the world... people... watching everyday people living unnaturally eventful lives - Glenroe in Ireland, Country GP in New Zealand, The Awakening in Singapore, House of Christianshavn in Denmark, Buniyaad in India and Kampos in Cyprus are other examples of the phenomenon."

In 1996, The European wrote about Nova TV, which had a wide European reach. "Europe's most watched channel proportionate to population is Nova TV, controlled by Central European Media Enterprises of the US. Launched two years ago it attracts half of all adult viewers in prime time, and gains a 70 percent share of the goal viewing audience compared with only 23 percent for the state rival ČT1. Nova TV may be Europe's most watched channel, but the most popular program in Europe – again taking population into account – is the Irish soap Glenroe."

In 1998 Raymond Snoddy, once senior editor of The Times, wrote about Tara TV (1996–2002) in Marketing Magazine. Tara TV, which reached a United Kingdom audience, aired both Glenroe and Fair City.

== Documentary ==
In December 2015, RTÉ aired a new documentary on Glenroe called Well Holy God It's Glenroe. It was the brainchild of RTÉ presenter Bláthnaid Treacy, who appeared in the show as Miley and Biddy's daughter Denise.

== Rerun ==
All 18 seasons of Glenroe were temporarily available on RTE Player at Christmas 2021 to celebrate 60 Years Of Television.
