= Mary McEvoy =

Irish actress

- Born: 27 October 1954 (age 71); Delvin, County Westmeath, Ireland
- Occupation: Actor
- Years active: Early 1980s – present
- Partner: Garvan Gallagher

Mary McEvoy (born 27 October 1954) is an Irish actress. She is recognised by television viewers for having played the role of Biddy Byrne in Glenroe from 1983 to 2000. After that she has been in numerous plays, including Big Maggie, Sive, The Field, The Chastitute, The Vagina Monologues, Shirley Valentine, The Matchmaker, The Year of the Hiker, Dancing at Lughnasa, Whippy, The Life and Times of Selma Mae, Moonlight and Music and Jo Bangles. She is also noted for her washing powder advertisements on television.

== Early life ==
An only child, Mary's father Larry was a sheep and cattle farmer, while her mother Catherine was the local district nurse. The family was well off enough to have a TV, and McEvoy remembers being mesmerised by the leading ladies of the 1940s' films.

Before becoming an actress McEvoy was employed at the Department of Agriculture in Dublin as a serological assistant testing for brucellosis. She left this position to return to work on her father's farm in Delvin, County Westmeath.

== Career ==
After returning to Dublin in the early 1980s, McEvoy got a job as a runner at the Dublin Theatre Festival and studied acting at the Oscar Theatre School. McEvoys earlier theatre work includes The Philanderer (George Bernard Shaw) and Semi-Private (Mary Halpin) at The Gate. She starred with Siobhán McKenna in the original production of Bailegangaire (Tom Murphy) and Wood of the Whispering (M. J. Molloy) with Druid Theatre directed by Garry Hynes, also Charlie's Aunt at the Gaiety Theatre, Dublin. While at Oscar Theatre School she auditioned for Biddy Byrne in Glenroe and was given the part because she had a licence to drive tractors.

From 1983 through to 2000, Byrne became one of Ireland's best known television actresses in her role as Biddy McDermott in Glenroe. Mary left the show in 2000 saying "I was out shoveling in the goose pen in Glenroe and I just said, "I can't do this anymore. It wasn't that I didn't like it; it was just I knew that I had to jump and if I didn't do it now I'd be wondering, 'what if' for the rest of my life."" After this Mary told the producers she wanted to leave the soap and her character Biddy was killed off in a car crash in May 2000, leaving fans of the show shocked. A few weeks later her co-star Joe Lynch announced he was also leaving the show. Glenroe was axed a year later in 2001.

McEvoy has appeared in the following films: How to Cheat in the Leaving Certificate, Moll Flanders and The Pear Bottle.

After leaving Glenroe, McEvoy has featured in the plays Big Maggie, Sive, The Field, The Chastitute, The Vagina Monologues, Shirley Valentine, The Matchmaker, The Year of the Hiker, Dancing at Lughnasa, Whippy, The Life and Times of Selma Mae, Moonlight and Music and Jo Bangles.

In 2010, McEvoy became a regular guest panelist on the TV3 show Midday and also was a guest on The Late Late Show in April 2011. In April 2011, McEvoy released her autobiography How The Light Gets In.

== Personal life ==
In 2009, on the documentary Would You Believe, McEvoy revealed that she suffered many years from depression, and that she is a Buddhist. McEvoy has been in a relationship with musician Garvan Gallagher for 23 years.
