= The Riordans =

Irish television drama serial

- Title card
- Genre: Soap opera
- Created by: James Douglas
- Country of origin: Ireland
- Original language: English

Production
- Production locations: Dunboyne, County Meath, Ireland
- Running time: 60 minutes

Original release
- Network: RTÉ
- Release: 4 January 1965 – 28 May 1979

The Riordans is an Irish television soap opera broadcast on RTÉ from 1965 to 1979 set in the fictional townland of Leestown in County Kilkenny. Its location filming with outside broadcast units, rather than using only television studios, broke the mould of broadcasting in the drama serial genre and inspired the creation of its British equivalent, Emmerdale Farm (now called Emmerdale) by Yorkshire Television in 1972.

== Plot ==
The main characters in the serial, the Riordan farming family, consisted of middle-aged parents, Tom and Mary Riordan, their eldest son Benjy, and younger sons Michael and Jude who had left farming for other careers and who had more adventurous personal lives. Other leading characters included the family doctor, his Protestant gentry-born wife, the (radical Vatican II-oriented) Catholic priest, the conservative Church of Ireland rector, the local pub owner, some nomadic Irish Travellers, and others.

== Cast ==
- John Cowley as Tom Riordan
- Moira Deady as Mary Riordan
- Tom Hickey as Benjy Riordan
- Chris O'Neill as Michael Riordan
- Biddy White Lennon as Maggie Riordan
- Frank O'Donovan as Batty Brennan
- Annie D'Alton as Minnie Brennan
- Tony Doyle as Father Sheehy
- Gerry Sullivan as Owen Howard
- Pamela Mant as Clair Howard (nee Nesbitt)
- Johnny Hoey as Francie Maher
- Mary Kearns as Delia Maher
- Joe Pilkington as Eamonn Maher
- Brenda Wilde as Eily Maher
- Bairbre Dowling as Josie Tracy
- Dermot McDowell as Dan Hennessy
- Jack O'Reilly as Johnny Mac
- Ann Rowan as Julia Mac
- Vincent Smith as Murph
- Patrick Gardiner as Frank Tracey
- Rachel Burrows as Miss Benson
- Christopher Casson as Canon Brown
- Gabriel Byrne as Pat Barry

== Production ==
=== Development ===
In 1964 the fledgling Telefís Éireann had launched Tolka Row, a drama serial set in a working class part of Dublin. Its success was immediate, with its actors becoming household names. One year later, aware that Ireland was still a largely rural country, and of the popularity of rural-based radio shows on Radio Éireann, notably The Kennedys of Castleross, Telefís Éireann decided to create a new rural drama serial set on a family farm. Located in Dunboyne, The Flathouse, owned by the Connolly family, was the setting for this programme.

Christopher Fitz-Simons was the show's first executive producer. The drama was written by James Douglas and later Wesley Burrowes, who derived much of his inspiration from engaging with and observing the lives of the locals in Kells, County Kilkenny.

Part of the success of the series was because many of the leading actors were from the background they represented. John Cowley, who played the patriarch of the family, Tom Riordan was from real farming stock in Ardbraccan in County Meath and many of the issues his character had to deal with reflected his experiences in rural Ireland. Actor Tom Hickey, who played Benjy was from County Kildare and also had personal rural experience.

Among the many series writers were James Douglas (the creator of the show), Wesley Burrowes, Pat O'Connor, Eugene McCabe, and Tom Coffey.

=== Filming ===
The Riordans proved to be a revolutionary television programme, both in Ireland and internationally. Its most dramatic innovation was in the use of outside broadcast units to film most of each episode on location in the countryside. Previously, drama serials were studio-based, with even supposed exterior filming all done with sets built in sound stages. Location filming was previously avoided for technical and financial reasons; firstly, it was reliant on weather conditions, which meant it was difficult to manage costs. Secondly, costs of transporting sets, wardrobe, cameras and film made location shooting more expensive, while the extra time involved in transporting edited footage back to studio, in the days before satellite links, also meant that location shoots were avoided. Thirdly, recording sound was thought to be more complicated in an open environment, and much easier on sound stages.

Telefís Éireann decided however to film most of The Riordans on location given that creating a farm set was not possible around the Dublin city studios at Montrose. Even if space had been available, it would have been impossible to mask city sounds. To speed up the process of getting film back to the editing studio, it filmed the programme on a farm near Dunboyne in County Meath, even though it set it in County Kilkenny.

The programme began colour transmission in 1975.

==== Influence ====
The use of outside broadcast units to film The Riordans influenced broadcasting abroad. In the early 1970s, Yorkshire Television while planning its own rural-based serial travelled to Ireland to observe The Riordans on location. Its new serial, Emmerdale Farm was influenced by their observations. By the late 1970s and 1980s, first Coronation Street, then EastEnders and most dramatically Brookside were influenced in their greater use of location work.

== Recurring themes ==
The Riordans concerned tensions, rivalries and relationships. Among the central ones were:

- generational - conservative parents (Tom and Mary) and radical young son and heir (Benjy); Batty Brennan and his wife Minnie Brennan, as the old people in the community, against everyone else;
- mother versus son - Mary against Benjy, which some critics likened to John Millington Synge's The Playboy of the Western World;
- liberal versus conservative - radical priest Father Sheehy versus his older parishioners; conservative parents Tom and Mary against liberal children Michael and Jude; conservative Catholics Tom and Mary versus their contraception-using daughter-in-law, Maggie Riordan;
- outsider versus insider - the Riordan family, with their middle-class farming background, against orphan Maggie, wife of Benjy; members of the nomadic Irish Traveller community versus the settled farming community;
- Class - well-to-do characters like the Church of Ireland upper middle-class doctor's wife, Mrs. Howard, and the middle-class farming Riordans, against farm labourers Batty Brennan and Eamonn Maher;
- community gossip - as with most soaps, The Riordans contained a 'local gossip' character, Minnie Brennan, who, typically for such characters, proclaimed no interest in gossip at all, but nevertheless became the source of local information on the lives and loves of the community.

One additional twist to the series was that the elderly gossip, Mrs Brennan, though considerably older than all the other characters (and actors) in the series except her onscreen husband Batty Brennan (he had to be written out of the series suddenly when the actor playing him died), was played by the elderly Annie D'Alton, the real-life wife of John Cowley, Tom Riordan, the lead middle-aged character. The striking difference in ages of the couple (she was his senior by twenty years, and as Minnie Brennan was made to look even older through make-up) became a source of comment among viewers, as some noted in letters to the show that she was old enough on screen to convincingly play his mother. Local actors included Peter Greene, who played a young boy always in trouble. Many other locals were cast during the many seasons.

=== Pushing agendas ===
Irish broadcasting in the 1960s and 1970s reflected the clash of ideas between elements of traditional rural Catholic society and new liberal ideas coming from abroad and from Catholicism itself through the reforms of the Second Vatican Council. Conservatives within RTÉ associated with the Knights of Columbanus clashed with liberals and with Marxists associated with Official Sinn Féin, over the content of programmes, though the extent to which the ultimate liberal victory was a product of one side infiltrating the station more successfully than the other is disputed, with one academic saying that the liberal win represented only the triumph of the 'liberal consensus'. However, then-leading OSF intellectual Eoghan Harris suggests that left-wing radicalism was of crucial importance in shaping RTÉ's output in the 1960s, 1970s and 1980s.

The Riordans tackled many 'conservative versus liberal' issues from its very start. Its start coincided with the coming into force of the Succession Act which for the first time granted to the wife of a farmer an automatic right of succession to the family farm, so removing the danger that after her husband's death she could be left with nothing, with the property being willed to a stranger. The issue was controversial; banks until the 1970s would not allow a wife to open an account except with the approval of her husband. Conservatives suggested that the new Act, which had been pushed through in the face of opposition by the Minister for Justice Charles Haughey, would undermine the traditional family and lead to the sale of a farm owned by a family, were a farmer's marriage to break up. Liberals argued that the reform was one of social justice and a long-overdue recognition of the rights of farmers' wives.

In the words of academic Dr Finola Kennedy, The Riordans "introduced one of the most sensitive issues in rural family life – the links between property, farm ownership and marriage at the very time of the debate on the Succession Bill".

The programme also focused on a range of farming issues, from the promotion of new farm technology to safety on farms. In the 1970s, the characters Tom and Benjy featured in a television advertisement urging farmers to have metal-framed cabs put onto tractors to protect themselves from injury should the vehicle overturn.

Other issues raised were illegitimacy, poverty, the problems of old age, marriage break-up, sexual activity, the dramatic changes in the post-Vatican II Catholic Church, and contraception, when it was revealed that Benjy's wife, Maggie, for medical reasons could not risk having a second pregnancy. The decision of the couple to use contraception caused controversy and criticism from "family values" organisations and some in the Catholic Church. The programme was on many issues praised and criticised in the media and in Dáil Éireann. Moreover, civil servants in the mid-1960s criticised the image portrayed of a farm advisor sent to advise farmers on advances in farming but who in the series was seen drinking in a pub and gossiping.

== Cancellation ==
The programme underwent a number of changes in the mid-1970s, most notably moving from a half-hour to one-hour format, as well as a change in theme tune. The music originally used to introduce each episode was Seóirse Bodley's orchestral arrangement of the Irish traditional tune, "The Palatine's Daughter". The decision of the actor Tom Hickey to leave the series caused some problems. His character, Benjy, was not killed off but went abroad to work with the Catholic Church in Africa. A new farm labourer, played by actor Gabriel Byrne, was introduced in 1978 and he played the love-interest for Maggie, Benjy's wife, who had remained after refusing to go to Africa with him. While the programme had declined somewhat from its heyday, it still regularly battled with The Late Late Show to top the TAM audience ratings and there was some surprise when one episode, which unusually departed from the 1970s and focused on Tom Riordan as a young man in the 1930s at a céilí, was critically acclaimed by the media and many older viewers, who viewed it as an accurate representation of life on an Irish farm in the past. With its considerable popularity, large cast of respected actors, high production values and its central location on the schedules of RTÉ 1, few expected the programme to be cancelled.

There was surprise and criticism when the new RTÉ Director of Programming Muiris MacConghail decided that the programme had run its course, and cancelled it. Part of the justification was cost: it was one of RTÉ's most expensive programmes to make. With the launch of television channel RTÉ 2 in 1978 the station believed that it needed to produce more programmes for its limited budget as a small station, and it could not do that if The Riordans took up much of the budget. Critics however suggested that RTÉ had failed to market the show internationally and that, given the size of the Irish diaspora, all interested in their home country, it could have had an international market abroad.

The public, the media and politicians criticised the cancellation. Notwithstanding the outcry, the last episode was broadcast in May 1979.

Politician Tom Enright spoke of the decision in the Dáil in 1980:

"The Riordans", one of the finest programmes that I can remember seeing and was most enjoyable, was dropped from television some time ago. It touched on many important social aspects of not just rural Irish life but all aspects of Irish life. It incorporated many delicate matters and matters which people shied away from and it was an in-depth study of life in Ireland. I am certain that the cost factor had a lot to do with the removal of this programme, but it was a mistake to remove it and this is evident when we see some of the programmes that replace it on the television service.

The programme was resurrected for RTÉ Radio 1 as a fifteen-minute daily show where it lasted a few years. The move to radio allowed some of the older actors to retire, while departed characters, such as Benjy and Eamon, could be brought back, albeit not with the original actors, Jonathan Ryan as Benjy and Mick Lally as Eamon. The radio serial was later cancelled in turn.

It was replaced by a spin-off serial Bracken, which saw Gabriel Byrne's character move from Kilkenny to Wicklow. Bracken became the second in a trilogy of agricultural serials produced by RTÉ, the final one being Glenroe.

== Legacy ==
The final 26 episodes (which were cut in two which resulted in 52 30-minute episodes) were shown from October 1980 on the British ITV channel - for the most part, in most areas, it was shown three times a week, on Tuesdays, Wednesdays and Thursdays at 12:30 - most regions temporarily dropped Australian wartime drama The Sullivans, which had been aired in that timeslot in most regions, to accommodate The Riordans. In London region, the series was only screened weekly on Monday finishing on 12 October 1981. In the Tyne Tees region, The Sullivans continued to air on Tuesdays and Thursdays at 12:30, but The Riordans aired on Wednesdays only - they gradually fell behind the network as a result. It was dropped from that timeslot after a while - only to continue in the 3:45 slot on Tuesday afternoons (a brief narrated refresher course was provided) and carried on in that slot until the final episode.

The Riordans was a key development in television drama, because, as well as giving RTÉ its first experience of how to create a long-running soap opera, its use of outside broadcast units changed the methodology by which later soaps in both Britain and Ireland were made. It embodied the changing Ireland of its period. When it was first broadcast, the reforming Seán Lemass was Taoiseach. When it finished, his son-in-law - the controversial Charles Haughey - was months from becoming Taoiseach. The Riordans covered a period of rapid transition in Irish life, from an agrarian, protectionist Ireland of the early 1960s to membership of the European Economic Community and so a rapidly changing rural economy in the 1970s. In the 1960s, Ireland was still rural, conservative and Catholic, with storylines like a character going on the Pill containing a shock value unthinkable a decade later. By the late 1970s, Ireland was becoming less rural, less conservative and less Catholic. Ironically, one of the biggest shock issues of the early show, the use of contraception, became less of a shock when in 1979 the provision of contraception was legalised, albeit with tight controls, in the very year the show was taken off air.

The changing nature of Irish society was shown in the soap operas that replaced The Riordans. After the short interregnum Bracken, came Glenroe, another 'rural' show set, unlike The Riordans, on the fringes of a town close to Dublin, with some characters living in an urban housing estate. Even the central characters, a farmer and his father Miley Byrne and Dinny Byrne, blurred the urban and rural worlds in a way that Tom Riordan never did, by turning their farm into an open farm for urban people to visit, and selling their produce in their own shop in the local town. After two decades that show itself was axed, leaving RTÉ with only one major homegrown soap opera, one that has no rural aspect at all, and is set in inner-city Dublin, Fair City.

=== Missing episodes ===
A controversial policy that was in force for the network in the 1960s and 1970s led to the erasing of previous episodes, so that the expensive video that had been used to record them could be reused. As a result, little remains of RTÉ's 1960s output, with shows like The Riordans, The Late Late Show and others routinely wiped after broadcast.

=== Later careers of the actors ===
Some of the actors had distinguished careers after the axing of The Riordans.

- After Bracken Gabriel Byrne went to the United States where he became a successful film actor.
- Tony Doyle, Father Sheehy, who had left the series in the mid-1970s, became a successful television actor with the BBC, starring in among other shows Ballykissangel, before dying suddenly aged 58 on the brink of his biggest television role yet.
- John Cowley worked largely in films, playing "the auctioneer" in John B. Keane's The Field with Richard Harris and also on stage. Cowley also continued with his lifelong campaign against coursing and other blood sports. He died in 1998.
- Annie D'Alton, Minnie Brennan, who was Cowley's much older wife in real life, died in 1983.
- Chris O'Neill, Michael Riordan, worked for some years as agent for Gabriel Byrne. He died in the United States in 1991.
- Biddy White Lennon, Maggie Riordan, left acting and became a successful author and publisher of cookery books; she died in November, 2017.
- Tom Hickey was an acclaimed stage and film actor. He died in May 2021.
- Moira Deady went on to act in Glenroe, the spin-off show that came from Bracken, the spin-off from The Riordans. She also starred in a number of films, including Angela's Ashes.

=== Spin offs ===
- Bracken (1978–1982) created and written by Wesley Burrowes.
- Glenroe (a spin-off from Bracken) (1983–2001) created and written by Wesley Burrowes.
