= The Outsider (1979 film) =

1979 British film by Tony Luraschi

- Directed by: Tony Luraschi
- Screenplay by: Tony Luraschi
- Based on: The Heritage of Michael Flaherty by Colin Leinster
- Produced by: Philippe Modave (executive)
- Starring: Craig Wasson; Sterling Hayden; Patricia Quinn; Niall O'Brien
- Music by: Ken Thorne
- Production companies: Cinematic Arts B.V.,
- Distributed by: Paramount Pictures (US) Cinema International Corporation (UK)
- Release date: 29 November 1979 (London)
- Running time: 128 minutes
- Language: English

The Outsider is a 1979 thriller film set largely in Belfast during The Troubles, written and directed by Tony Luraschi in his feature film debut. The film is based on the book The Heritage of Michael Flaherty by Colin Leinster, and details the fictional experience of an idealistic Irish-American who travels to Ireland and joins the IRA in the 1970s.

== Production ==
Luraschi, who had worked as an assistant director with Stanley Kramer and Roger Vadim, had never been to Ireland until 1976. The company was unable to film in Northern Ireland, so instead made arrangement with a local residents' association to film the exterior scenes in the Dublin suburb of Ringsend.

== Release ==
Despite the distributor's hope, the film was rejected by the 1979 London Film Festival. It opened at The Gate 2 cinema in Bloomsbury, London on 29 November 1979 during the festival.

== Reception ==
The film caused a minor scandal where government officials were outraged at a scene that showed a British officer participating in the torture of a partially blind Irish Catholic prisoner.

New York magazine praised the direction "his skill at realistically conveying the terrible waste of the civil strife in Northern Ireland and the chilling day-to-day acceptance of violence as a way of life there. Unfortunately, the red-herring contrivances of his plot trivialize his powerful material."

Stepan O'Fetchit said "At the other extreme, modern-dress movies like Tony Luraschi's The Outsider... purport to present a real, contemporary Ireland while effectively reducing it to a traffic snarl-up of faceless ideologues wielding guns, balaclavas, and gritty one-liners."

Variety called it a "thoughtful terrorism drama" but felt that the "lack of concession on the part of director-scripter Tony Luraschi to conventional thriller pacing makes the Paramount-financed production no easy moneyspinner."
