= List of one-hit wonders in Ireland =

Music singles by artists who had no other top 40 chart hits in the Republic of Ireland

This following is a list of one-hit wonders in Ireland, showing Irish musical acts who only managed to score one top forty hit in the Irish singles chart. Many of the One-hit wonders in the UK were also one hit wonders in Ireland, but are not listed here.

== 1960s ==
- Dominic Behan ("Liverpool Lou", 1964)
- Declan Ryan ("I Need You", 1965)
- Them ("Here Comes the Night", 1965)
- Alan Dee ("Michael Murphy's Boy", 1966)
- The Johnny Flynn Showband ("Black and Tan Gun", 1966)
- The Kings ("Beautiful Dreamer", 1966)
- Eddie Mack and the Columbia Showband ("Way Out of Reach", 1966)
- Terry Mahon ("If I Cried", 1966)
- The Millionaires ("Winter Winds", 1966)
- The Broadsiders ("Shores of Amerikay", 1967)
- Des Kelly ("Streets of Baltimore", 1967)
- Johnny Kelly ("The Black Velvet Band", 1967)
- The Tinkers ("Carrickfergus", 1967)
- Derrick and the Sounds ("Power of Love", 1968)
- Granny's Intentions ("Never an Everyday Thing", 1968)
- The Irish Rovers ("The Unicorn", 1968)
- Kathleen and Deirdre ("Bridal Path", 1968)
- Pat McGeegan ("Chance of a Lifetime", 1968)
- Sheelah Mack ("Harper Valley P.T.A.", 1968)
- The Orange Machine ("Three Jolly Little Dwarfs", 1968)
- The Pattersons ("I Don't Want to Be a Memory", 1968)
- Sugar Shack ("Morning Dew", 1968)
- The Weaver Folk ("Henry My Son", 1968)
- Pat Campbell ("The Deal", 1969)
- Martin Codd and the Herdsmen ("Whisper Your Mother's Name", 1969)
- Muriel Day ("The Wages of Love", 1969)
- Don Duggan and the Savoys ("Under Your Spell Again", 1969)
- Tom Dunphy ("If I Didn't Have a Dime", 1969)
- The Emeralds ("Golden Jubilee", 1969)
- Brendan Hutchinson and the Navak ("Lightning Express", 1969)
- Peter Law and the New Pacific ("Ruby Don't Take Your Love to Town", 1969)
- John MacNally ("Mary In the Morning", 1969)

== 1970s ==
- Gentry ("Yellow River", 1970)
- Maxi, Dick and Twink ("Things You Hear About Me", 1970)
- Mick Roche and The Arrows ("My Woman My Woman My Wife", 1971)
- George Kaye ("The Flower of Sweet Strabane", 1971)
- Michael Landers ("If I Could Be a Sailor Man", 1971)
- Darby O'Gill ("Poor Poor Farmer", 1971)
- Pat Roper and the Spotlights ("The Ring Your Mother Wore", 1971)
- Marie ("Nickel Song", 1972)
- Bernie and the Tartans ("A Mother's Love is a Blessing", 1972)
- Denis Bowler and the Sun Valley Boys ("The Ireland of Tomorrow", 1972)
- Jimmy Conway ("Matrimony", 1972)
- Paddy Day ("Kitty Kelly", 1972)
- Seamus Donnelly ("West of the Old River Shannon", 1972)
- Brendan Donovan ("We Gotta Reach Out", 1972)
- The Flying Column ("Four Green Fields", 1972)
- Tony Kearney ("Bloody Sunday", 1972)
- Paddywagon – "Sunday Bloody Sunday", 1972)
- Gerry Reynolds and the Hi-Lows ("100 Children", 1972)
- The Donal Ring Sound ("Beautiful City", 1972)
- Sean Thompson and the Everglades ("If You Only Had Taken the Time", 1972)
- Tracey and the Grassroots ("Letter to Heaven", 1972)
- American Pie ("Dingle Bay Boat Song", 1973)
- Gerry Black and the Seasons ("Meet Me Tonight In Loredo", 1973)
- Geraldine Kane ("Father", 1973)
- Tony O'Leary ("Old Dogs Children and Watermelon Wine", 1973)
- Des Smith ("Rag and Bone", 1973)
- Tony Treacy and the Country Blue Boys ("To Love a Lady", 1973)
- Shelley and the Big Valley ("Love at Eleven", 1974)
- Larry Hogan ("Simple Song of Love", 1974)
- The Light Blues ("Heffo's Heroes", 1974)
- Lola and the New Blues ("I'm So Afraid I'm Falling", 1974)
- The Others ("Ring Ring", 1974)
- Snakehips ("Runaway", 1974)
- Aileach ("Lullaby", 1975)
- Just 4 ("Glad All Over", 1975)
- Paddy McGuigan ("I Was Only Dreaming", 1975)
- The Radiators from Space ("Television Screen", 1977)
- Rubbish ("Hey C'Mere", 1977)
- Jamie Stone ("I Believe in Love", 1977)
- Shaun Davey ("Pride of the Herd", 1978)
- The Establishment ("The Unfree Child", 1978)
- Famous Shamus ("Big Tom Will Make Me a Star", 1978)
- James Galway ("Annie's Song", 1978)
- Rascal ("Ecstasy", 1978)
- Stone Free ("Rockin' Down Woodstock Way", 1978)
- Daddy Cool and the Lollipops ("Summertime Blues", 1979)
- Caitriona Walsh ("Viva IL Papa", 1979)

== 1980s ==
- "Horoscopes" – Sheeba (1981)
- "It's a Sunday Morning" – Fuze (1981)
- "Here Today Gone Tomorrow" – The Duskeys (1982)
- "Listen" – Stiff Little Fingers (1982)
- "Waterford My Home" – The Gillespies (1984)
- "The Business Enterprise (My Friend John)" – Those Nervous Animals (1985)
- "Song & Dance Man" – Dan the Street Singer (1985)
- "Jamboree / Sing a Song for Joy" – Charlie McGettigan (1985)
- "Cry from the Heart" – Regent Street (1985)
- "Mulligan & Me" – The Shamrocks (1985)
- "Make It Work" – Paul Doran (1986)
- "Make It Work" – The Self Aid Band (1986)
- "The Fields of Athenry" – Century Steel Band (1986)
- "Feel It Now" – The Fountainhead (1986)
- "Raglan Road" – Luke Kelly with The Dubliners (1986)
- "Green Boys" – Light a Big Fire (1986)
- "Waiting for a Miracle" – Mama's Boys (1987)
- "Come Home Danny Boy" – Seamus Magee (1987)
- "Town to Town" – Microdisney (1987)
- "My Heart Belongs to Dublin" – Mulligan (1988)
- "Take Him Home" – Jump the Gun (1988)
- "The Real Me" – Kiev Connolly and The Missing Passengers (1989)
- "Dark Hill" – Hinterland (1989)
- "Say Goodbye" – Malfunctions (1989)

== 1990s ==
- "The By-road to Glenroe" – Mick Lally (1990)
- "Give It a Lash Jack" – Liam Harrison and The GOAL Celebrities (1990)
- "The Game" – The Memories (1990)
- "Ooh Aah Paul McGrath" – Watch Your House (1990)
- "Could It Be That I'm in Love?" – Kim Jackson (1991)
- "Billy Can't Read" – Seán Óg Farrell (1991)
- "Sonny" – Mary Lou Harris (1991)
- "Galway and Los Angeles" – Toasted Heretic (1991)
- "This Time"/"Life Without You" – Chris Moore (1993)
- "Harmony Hill" – Dervish (1993)
- "No Lager" – Mad Jocks featuring Jockmaster B.A (1994)
- "Riverdance" – Bill Whelan (1994)
- "Winter, Fire and Snow" – Anúna (1994)
- "Lumen" – Mícheál Ó Súilleabháin (1995)
- "Dreamin' – Eddie Friel (1995)
- "Nocturne" – Secret Garden (1995)
- "The Voice" – Eimear Quinn (1996)
- "She Moved Through the Fair" – Furry Village (1996)
- "Theme from Mission: Impossible" – Larry Mullen Jr. and Adam Clayton (1996)
- "Goodbye Girl" – Shane O'Donoghue, 2FM Charity Single (1996)
- "Aon Focal Eile" – Noel Furlong Family Group (1996)
- "Mysterious Girl" – Marc Roberts (1996)
- "Tell Me Ma" – Sham Rock (1998)
- "Saltwater" – Máire Brennan (1999)
- "Is All Over Now" – Dawn Martin (1999)
- "Man Utd Man" – Men Utd featuring The Absolutelys (1999)
- "The Fields of Athenry" – Cox Crew (1999)

== 2000s ==
- "Who's in the House" – Fr. Brian and the Fun Lovin' Cardinals (2000)
- "New Beginning" – Stephen Gately (2000)
- "We're Really Saying Something" – Buffalo G (2000)
- "Suspicious Minds" / "Whiskey in the Jar" – DJ Scruffy Duffy (2001)
- "Feeling So Low" – Petronella (2001)
- "May We Never Have to Say Goodbye" – Ronan Tynan and Rita Connolly (2003)
- "Dirty Old Town"/"Road to Paradise" – J Johnstone, J Kerr and Shane MacGowan (2004)
- "The Langer" – Tim O'Riordan & Natural Gas (2004)
- "The Fields of Athenry" – Christina Noble And The Irish Rugby Team (2005)
- "Number One" – Tabby (2005)
- "Unplayed Piano" – Lisa Hannigan (with Damien Rice) (2005)
- "The Red, Yellow and Green" – Derek Ryan (2006)
- "Make Her Cry" – The Marshals (2006)
- "Merry Christmas Jakey Boy" – Jake Stevens (2006)
- "Ireland's Call – The Celtic Tenors (2007)
- "The Munster song" – Glen Keating and Greg Ryan (2008)
- "Beautiful Filth" – Scimon Tist (2008)
- "Irish Party" – Shakey (2008)
- "On Wings" – Leanne Moore (2008)
- "There's No one as irish as Barack Obama – Corrigan Brothers (2008)
- "Shine on Kilkenny" – The Kilkennys (2009)
- "Et Cetera" – Sinéad Mulvey and Black Daisy (2009)
- "Shine" – Laura Izibor (2009)

== 2010s ==
- "Haiti Child" – Elaine Doonan and Pete Fagan
- "Something Good Can Work" – Two Door Cinema Club
- "Whiskey in the Jar" – Adam and The High Kings
- "He Drinks Teqilia" – Crystal Swing
- "Beautiful Lies" – Roberta Howett
- "I Just Call You Mine" – Mary Byrne
- "Higher Love" – James Vincent McMorrow
- "Only Love Survives" – Ryan Dolan
- "Catch Your Fall" – Don Mescall
- "Roots" – Orla Gartland
- "Heartbeat" – Can-linn featuring Kasey Smith
- "Nothing's Gonna Stop Us Now" – JP Gilbourne
- "Winter Song" – Twitterxmassingle
- "My Hero" – Presentation Secondary School, Clonmel
- "We All Stand Together" – Zog Chorus
- "High Hopes" – High Hopes Choir
- "Silver Lining" – Aoife Parle

== 2020s ==
- "Pour the Milk" – Robbie Doherty and Keees (2020)
- "Fake Fine" – Robert Grace (2020)
- "Plugged in Freestyle" – A92 (2020)
- "Get Out My Head" – Shane Codd (2020)
- "IDK Why" – Lea Heart (2021)
- "New Day" – Lyra (2021)
- "Talk About" – DJ Craig Gorman (2021)
- "The Way I Am" – The Tumbling Paddies (2023)
- "Birds in the Sky" – NewEra (2024)
- "Irish Pub Song" – The High Kings (2024)
- "Mom & Dad" – Darren Kiely (2024)
- "Doomsday Blue" – Bambie Thug (2024)
- "Simmer Down" – Casper Walsh (2024)
- "Date Nite" – Khakikid & Saint Demarcus (2025)
- "Talk of the Town" – Reggie (2025)
- "Noble" – F3miii (2026)

== Aggregate ensemble groups ==
The following is a list of aggregate ensemble groups. These are usually put together for charity purposes. The ones listed below are one-hit wonders in their respective line-ups, but most are primarily made up of Various Artists.

- Irish Women in Harmony – "Dreams" (2020)
- Various Artists – "Simple Things" (2013) Cycle Against Suicide
- Various Artists – "Tiny Dancer A Song for Lily Mae" (2012)
- Damien Dempsey, The Dubliners, Bressie, Danny O'Reilly and Republic of Ireland national football team – "The Rocky Road to Poland" (2012)
- U2, The Dubliners, Kíla and A Band of Bowsies – "The Ballad of Ronnie Drew" (2008)
- Various Artists – "Candle for Kosovo" (1999)
- Various Artists – "Merry Christmas/War is Over" (1991)
- Jocks & Co. – "Rap Against Rape" (1990)
- Various Artists – "Think of Somebody Out There" (1988)
- The Concerned – "Show Some Concern" (1985)

== Under an alternative name ==
- 21 Demands scored a single hit ("Give Me a Minute" in 2007), but scored a string of hits as Kodaline later.

== See also ==
- Lists of one-hit wonders
- Music of Ireland
