= Shinawil =

Irish television production company

ShinAwiL
- Company type: Company limited by shares
- Industry: Television
- Genre: Television production
- Founded: 1999
- Founders: Larry Bass; Simon Gibney
- Headquarters: Dublin, Ireland
- Area served: Ireland
- Key people: Larry Bass (CEO)
- Services: Television programme production
- Website: shinawil.com

Shinawil (stylised as ShinAwiL) Productions is an Irish television production company. It was founded by producer Larry Bass and director Simon Gibney in 1999. It was acquired by Screentime (branded as Screentime ShinAwiL) as part of a deal to produce an Irish version of Popstars in 2002. In 2015, Screentime sold its 49% stake in Irish production company Shinawil. Productions to date have included Irish versions of international franchises Dragons' Den, Dancing with the Stars and Popstars for RTÉ Television and The Apprentice for TV3.

== Filmography ==
Year	Title	Notes	Broadcaster
2001	Popstars	1 series	RTÉ One
2002–2008	You're a Star	6 series	RTÉ One
2005–2007	Charity You're a Star	3 series	RTÉ One
2008–2011	The Apprentice	4 series	TV3
2008–2011	The Apprentice: You're Fired!	4 series	TV3
2009	Charity Lords of the Ring	1 series	RTÉ One
2009–2017	Dragons' Den	8 series	RTÉ One
2010	Fame: The Musical	1 series	RTÉ One
2011–2012; 2014	MasterChef Ireland	3 series	RTÉ2; RTÉ One
2012	Undercover NI	1 series	BBC One Northern Ireland
2012	The Obesity Clinic	1 series	RTÉ One
2012–2016	The Voice of Ireland	5 series	RTÉ One
2013	Junior Dragons' Den	1 series	RTÉ One
2013; 2017	Celebrity MasterChef Ireland	2 series	RTÉ One; TV3
2013	Celebrity Apprentice	1 series	TV3
2013	Celebrity Apprentice: You're Fired!	1 series	TV3
2014–2015	Meet the McDonaghs	2 series	RTÉ2
2014	Bressie's Teenage Kicks	1 series	RTÉ2
2015–	Home of the Year	12 series	RTÉ One
2015	Get the Numbers, Write	1 series	TV3
2015	Tested On Humans	1 series	RTÉ2
2015	The Voice of Ireland: Afterparty	1 series	RTÉ2
2016	Along Home Shores	1 series	UTV Ireland
2016	True North, 'Gift from Death	1 special	BBC One Northern Ireland
2016	Peak Performance	1 series	Eir Sport
2016–2019	Celebrity Home of the Year	3 specials	RTÉ One
2016–2018	What Are You Eating?	3 series	RTÉ One
2017–2020; 2022–2025	Dancing with the Stars	6 series	RTÉ One
2017–2019	Can't Stop Dancing	3 series	RTÉ One
2017	What Are You Working For?	1 special	RTÉ One
2018–2019	Say Yes to the Dress	2 series	RTÉ One
2019–2020	RTÉjr Goes Dancing with the Stars	2 series	RTÉjr
2019	How to Live Better for Longer	1 special	RTÉ One
2019	Bernard and Marty's Big Adventure	1 series	RTÉ One
2020	Bernard and Marty: On the Road Again	1 series	RTÉ One
2020–	Miss Scarlet and The Duke	1 series	Alibi
2020	O'Casey in the Estate	1 series	RTÉ One
2020	Songs from An Empty Room	1 special	RTÉ2
2020	Dancing with the Stars - Putting On the Glitz	1 special	RTÉ One
2020; 2021	Soundtrack to My Life	1 special; 1 series	RTÉ One
2021	Bernard's Working Comics	1 series	RTÉ2
2021	Last Singer Standing	1 series	RTÉ One
2022	The Ultimate Irish Playlist	1 special	RTÉ One
2023	Dancing with the Stars (Irish TV series)	1 series	RTÉ One
2024	Borderline	1 series	MGM+
2025	The Lightkeeper	film	
