= Self Aid =

1986 concert in Dublin, Ireland

- Self-Aid poster with logo
- Genre: Pop music Rock music Traditional Irish music
- Dates: 17 May 1986
- Locations: RDS Arena in Ballsbridge, Dublin, Ireland
- Years active: 1986
- Founders: Tony Bolland; Niall Matthews

Self Aid was an unemployment benefit concert held in Dublin, Ireland on 17 May 1986. The concert performances were primarily by Irish musicians, although Elvis Costello and Chris Rea, both Englishmen of Irish descent, were designated "honorary Irishmen" for the day; the event was promoted by Jim Aiken. The concert included the last performance by the Boomtown Rats until they reformed in 2013.

The purpose of the concert was to highlight the chronic unemployment problem in Ireland at the time, with nearly 250,000 people unemployed. The 14-hour concert was the largest that had ever been staged in Ireland. All musicians that took part donated their time free of charge. All profits from the concert and subsequent album, Live for Ireland, went to the Self Aid Trust. The telethon raised millions of pounds for a job creation trust fund as well as over 1000 job pledges. The song chosen for the finale was "Let's Make it Work", written by Christy Moore and Dublin songwriter Paul Doran. Tributes were paid to Phil Lynott who had died just 4 months earlier, including a performance by a reformed Thin Lizzy with Gary Moore on lead vocals.

The concept of the concert — job creation through pledges — attracted criticism both at the time and subsequently, with critics claiming that no jobs had actually arisen as a result other than vacancies that already existed.

== Concert performers ==
The line-up included:

- Auto Da Fé
- Bagatelle
- Big Self
- Blue in Heaven
- The Boomtown Rats
- Paul Brady
- Chris de Burgh
- Cactus World News
- The Chieftains
- Clannad
- De Dannan
- Elvis Costello
- Rory Gallagher
- The Fountainhead
- In Tua Nua
- Christy Moore
- Van Morrison
- Moving Hearts
- The Pogues
- Chris Rea
- Scullion
- Brush Shiels
- Stockton's Wing
- Thin Lizzy
- Those Nervous Animals
- U2

== Live For Ireland songs ==
- Maggie's Farm - U2 (6:46)
- Seven into the Sea - In Tua Nua (3:53)
- Many Rivers to Cross - Elvis Costello and the Attractions (2:41)
- Dirty Old Town - The Pogues (3:45)
- Don't Pay the Ferryman - Chris DeBurgh (3:32)
- Harry's Game - Clannad (2:32)
- The Bridge - Cactus World News (4:19)
- Looking after No. 1 - The Boomtown Rats (4:50) [not on US release]
- Here Comes the Knight - Van Morrison (3:58)
- Don't Believe a Word - Thin Lizzy (2:23) [not on US release]
- Steel River - Chris Rea (4:48)
- Make it Work - Christy Moore / Paul Doran (Larry Mullen) (3:13)
- The Lark - Moving Hearts (5:35)
- The Island - Paul Brady (5:09)
- Feel it Now - The Fountainhead (5:01)
- Exiles - Auto Da Fe (5:17)

=== Alternate tracks on US release ===
- Boil the Breakfast Early - The Chieftains
- Joey's on the Street Again - The Boomtown Rats

=== Alternate tracks on double vinyl/cassette release ===
- The Business Enterprise (My Friend John) - Those Nervous Animals
- A Sense of Freedom - Les Enfants
- The Arrival of Queen Sheeba in Galway - De Dannan
- Old Pal - Brush Shiels
- Rock 'N' Roll Fantasy - Bagatelle
- Keep on Climbin' - Freddie White
- Tell Me - Blue in Heaven
- Follow Me - Rory Gallagher
- Carol - Scullion
- Leave My Kitten Alone - Elvis Costello and the Attractions
- Skidoo - Stockton's Wing
- Independence - Big Self

Note: There have been multiple versions of this album, with varying tracks, in different formats and across different territories
