= Jenny McCudden =

Irish journalist

- Born: Naas, County Kildare, Ireland
- Education: Dublin City University; National University of Ireland
- Occupations: Newsreader; journalist
- Notable credits: The Sligo Champion; TV3 News; BBC News

Jenny McCudden is an Irish journalist, newspaper editor, author and television producer. Having started her career in print journalism, she moved into broadcasting, working on both radio and television. Her credits include presenting news reports and programmes for BBC News in the United Kingdom, and TV3 News in Ireland, where she was the station's Western Correspondent for several years. After her return to the newspaper industry in early 2012, The Sligo Champion appointed her as its editor in July of that year, making her the first woman to occupy that position. McCudden is the author of Impact: The Human Stories Behind Ireland's Road Tragedies, a book concerning people affected by road fatalities in Ireland, which was later turned into a documentary for TV3, presented by Gay Byrne. She has also written fiction and poetry, having her work published as part of an anthology and in The Irish Times.

== Career ==
McCudden is from Naas, County Kildare. After studying Journalism and French at Dublin City University she went on to complete an MA in Writing at the National University of Ireland in Galway. Starting as a local reporter she worked for the Westmeath-Offaly Independent in Athlone and Midlands Radio 3 in Tullamore. She later joined the Sunday World, and in 2012 was briefly a reporter with the Irish Sun.

With the launch of TV3 in 1998, McCudden was one of the original reporters on the broadcaster's news programme, TV3 News, before later moving to Great Britain to work at the BBC. Based at various times in both Birmingham and London, she was a producer and reporter for BBC News, but after five years with the Corporation she returned to TV3 News in 2006, where she became their Western Correspondent. She left the broadcaster in 2012, returning to print journalism, and later that year took up the role of editor at The Sligo Champion. In doing so, McCudden became the first woman to edit the newspaper since its foundation in 1836, and the first editor not to have previously been employed there.

She wrote her first book, Impact: The Human Stories Behind Ireland's Road Tragedies, after witnessing numerous road traffic accidents throughout her journalistic career: "I've been working as a correspondent for TV3 for the past number of years and I come across road fatalities far too regularly. It's in the nature of my job to be at the scene of horrible smashes, often soon after they've happened." The book led to controversy following an edition of RTÉ One's The Late Late Show in February 2010 in which her TV3 colleagues perceived she had been snubbed by Raidió Teilifís Éireann (RTÉ) because she was employed by a rival broadcaster. McCudden was in the audience, and her book was mentioned by host Ryan Tubridy following a segment about drink driving, but her presence itself was ignored. However, speaking to the Evening Herald some days later, she dismissed claims of broadcaster rivalry: "He [Ryan Tubridy] mentioned my name, the book's name and the publishers at least three times. I have no issues with Ryan. The aim of the book is to save lives, which is much more important in the bigger picture."

In March 2010, McCudden worked with veteran broadcaster and television presenter Gay Byrne on a TV3 documentary based on her book. The two-part programme, Impact: Tragedy on Irish Roads was aired by the channel in March 2010. The film featured interviews with the relatives of people killed in road traffic accidents, as well as some of those who had survived. Byrne, who is chair of the Road Safety Authority was keen to present the programme after McCudden sent him a copy of her book and TV3 decided to make the documentary. News of her collaboration with Byrne inspired an edition of the satirical My Week column, a feature in The Times written in the form of a fictional diary detailing her experience. It appeared on 6 March 2010.

She has also written fiction and poetry, contributing some of her work to Three Times Daily, an anthology of short fiction and poetry published in 2010. One of her stories, titled "Fallow", was published in The Irish Times in December 2011. She was a featured reader at the 2009 Cúirt International Festival of Literature.

== Television ==
- TV3 News (1998–2001, 2006–2012)
- BBC News (2001–2006)
- Impact: Tragedy on Irish Roads (2010)

== Bibliography ==
- Impact: The Human Stories Behind Ireland's Road Tragedies: Collins Press (2010) ISBN 1848890273
- Three Times Daily: New Voices in Poetry: Original Writing Ltd (2010) ISBN 1907179518 (contributor)

Preceded by Jim Grey	Editor of The Sligo Champion; 2012–Present	Succeeded by Incumbent
