= Michelle Massey =

British businesswoman (born 1981)

Michelle Massey (born 1981) is an English businessperson and former model. She won the third series of the Irish version of The Apprentice TV show, defeating Niamh McDonald in the final. As a result, she earned a €100,000 contract with entrepreneur Bill Cullen's company and was given e-commerce to work on. She was also presented with a car. She began work, alongside Steve Rayner (the winner of the 2009 series), the following January.

Massey is from a Jehovah's Witness background. She left her family at the age of 15 because of a religious disagreement. She did dancing in nightclubs as a teenager. She went to Ireland when she was 19 years old. She spent ten years working as a sales consultant.

Her interests include horse riding, rugby union and Coronation Street.
