= Breffny Morgan =

Irish television personality

- Born: Cork, Ireland
- Known for: The Apprentice, Celebrity Salon, Celebrity Bainisteoir

Breffny Morgan is an Irish socialite and television personality, known for his appearances on reality shows such as The Apprentice, Celebrity Salon and Celebrity Bainisteoir.

== Life and work ==
=== Early life ===
He was born in Cork, was raised by single mother, Geraldine Morgan, which he has spoken publicly with his pride. He is an experienced rower, having won an Irish Rowing Championship in 2002.

=== Rowing ===
Morgan moved to America to study and row crew at Harvard University, graduating in 2008 with a degree in biology. Morgan was a member of the Irish and British crew that attempted a crossing of the Atlantic Ocean in 2009, aboard the fourteen-man vessel 'La Mondiale'. Teammates here included Peter Williams, Leven Brown, and Ian McKeever Eleven days into this crossing, La Mondiale was rowing three days ahead of world record pace when the rudder was sheared off by a submerged object, possibly a whale. Rudderless, the crew was stranded in a prolonged sea gale, and after a time they were safely rescued by the 24,000 ton bulk carrier 'Island Ranger'. La Mondiale, however, was destroyed in the process.

=== Television appearances ===
Morgan was a candidate in the 2009 series of The Apprentice. This season featured the on-screen romance of Breffny and a fellow cast member. In 2010, he was a contestant on Celebrity Salon on TV3, and on Celebrity Bainisteoir for RTÉ One.

=== Other work ===
Morgan is a fashion model, signed with Celia Holman Lee. Campaign work has included Remus Uomo and Jacamo. He has modelled for Paddy Power, sometimes partnering Georgia Salpa, who parties with Morgan on the Dublin social scene.

== Public image ==
Morgan was the recipient of a Best Dressed Newcomer Award from the Kerry Fashion Awards. The Irish Independent and the Irish Examiner both labelled him a sex symbol. However, not all media portrayals are as positive, indeed Morgan reported to the Evening Herald that an online search cost Morgan his American girlfriend, claiming that her parents googled him and advised their daughter to end the relationship. A separate Herald article summarised Morgan's tendency to polarise audiences by stating "If TV entertainment was edible, then Breffny Morgan is a large jar of marmite".
