= Sunday Bloody Sunday (Paddywagon song) =

Single by Paddywagon
- B-side: "Greener Hills"
- Released: March 1972
- Recorded: 1972
- Genre: Protest song, Irish traditional
- Length: 1:59
- Label: Columbia
- Songwriters: Mike McGettigan, Maurice McGettigan, Patsy Fayne

Paddywagon singles chronology
"Sunday Bloody Sunday" (1972)	"The Ghost Of Molly Maguire" (1972)

"Sunday Bloody Sunday" is a protest song by Irish band Paddywagon addressing the Bloody Sunday massacre of 30 January 1972.

== Lyrics ==
The lyrics recount the killing of 13 people by British soldiers of the 1st Battalion, Parachute Regiment during a Northern Ireland Civil Rights Association (NICRA) protest against internment without trial. The song says "They only asked for justice / Which was their human right. To end their shame and torture, To rid them of their plight;" and concludes by saying, "They died with this desire./ That we Irish understand / For peace between the people / And the love of Ireland."

== Song history ==
"Sunday Bloody Sunday" was released in March 1972. It was considered a rebel song and thus not played by the Republic of Ireland's national broadcaster RTÉ. Despite this, it reached number one in the Irish Singles Chart on 29 April 1972.

== See also ==
- List of one-hit wonders in Ireland

== Personnel ==
- Vocals and bass: Patsy Fayne
- Lead guitar: Colm McGettigan
- Guitar/Fiddle: Mike Mannion
- Drums: Hugh McGettigan
- Saxophone: Seamus Downey
- Trumpet and bass: Maurice McGettigan
