= Niamh McDonald =

Niamh McDonald was a contestant and runner-up in the business reality TV show The Irish Apprentice in 2010.

McDonald finished as runner-up to winner Michelle Massey in a closely contested final.

She won 10/13 tasks, 3 of which were as project manager.

McDonald is from Wexford and is the youngest of 7 children. She graduated with an honors degree in Business Studies and Marketing from University of Limerick and was working as a Marketing Manager before entering the show.

After the airing of the show McDonald was head-hunted by Facebook to join their Sales Team.

In 2016, she became engaged to fellow contestant Will McCreevy.
