= Who's in the House =

2000 song by Fr. Brian and the Fun Lovin' Cardinals

Single by Fr. Brian and the Fun Lovin' Cardinals
- Released: 2000
- Genre: Hip-hop, novelty
- Length: 3:42
- Label: Fatha Records
- Songwriters: Brendan O'Connor, Graham Finn

Audio sample
- file; help

Who's in the House" is a novelty song and hit single by Fr. Brian and the Fun Lovin' Cardinals. It reached number three on the Irish Singles Chart, and spent 12 weeks in the top 40 in 2000.

The song came from Brendan O'Connor's satirical character "Fr. Brian" on Don't Feed the Gondolas (a comedy game show shown on RTÉ in the late '90s). A rap style song, it parodies the Catholic Church's attempts to be "cool" and "down with the kids" and contains the immortal chorus: "Who's in the House? Jesus in the House". It is unrelated to the 1993 American Pentecostal Christian rap song of the same name by Carman despite having the exact same name and the nearly identical lyrics of "Who's in the house? J.C! Jesus Christ is in the house!".

Both songs are essentially responsible for the popularity of the "Jesus in the house" lyric, one in Ireland and the other in the United States.

== Charts ==
Chart (2000)	Peak position
Ireland (IRMA)	3

== See also ==
- List of one-hit wonders in Ireland
