= Sammy Virji =

English DJ and record producer (born 1996)

- Also known as: Virji
- Born: Samuel Bashir Virji; 30 September 1996 (age 30); London, England
- Genres: UK garage; dubstep; bassline
- Occupations: DJ; record producer
- Instrument: Keyboards
- Years active: 2015–present

Samuel Bashir Virji (born 30 September 1996) is a British DJ and record producer. Born in London, he grew up in Witney, and attended Newcastle University before dropping out to pursue his music career. His 2020 album, Spice Up My Life, charted at No. 7 on the UK Dance Albums Chart. After releasing a remix of Piri & Tommy's "On & On", he released "If U Need It", which charted at No. 85 on the UK singles chart. His earlier works belonged to the bassline genre, while his later works were UK garage.

== Life and career ==
Samuel Virji was born in London, and later moved to Oxfordshire, settling in Witney and attending St Edward’s School Oxford. He has South Asian heritage. His father played trombone on The Miseducation of Lauryn Hill, an album described by DJ Mag in June 2024 as "one of the most critically and commercially successful albums in both neo soul and popular music", and his record collection included Latin music, African music, and jazz. Sammy's first major musical interest was in Michael Jackson, followed by Motown. He started writing on piano and guitar before making his own music on GarageBand, switching to Logic Pro when he had access to the computer at his father's house. He began listening to dubstep aged sixteen after a friend gave him "Rinse: 06", a Rinse FM CD mixed by Plastician, followed by a CD mixed by Skream. He studied biology at Newcastle University. While there, he became involved in bassline after seeing Flava D perform at a club and deciding that he wanted to follow suit. He dropped out during the third year after calculating that he was able to make a living from music. He began releasing his early works in the bassline genre in 2015. Many of his works until 2019 made use of images of television chef Ainsley Harriott. Around this time, he was a regular poster on the Facebook group Lengoland, a bass music forum which functioned between 2017 and 2021.

He changed direction away from bassline, producing UK garage in the late 2010s. Around this time, Conducta asked if he could release one of Virji's tracks on his Kiwi Rekords label. The label released several of his works including "Shapes" and "Whippet". In 2020, Virji released his debut album, Spice Up My Life, having previously released the single "Until Tomorrow" from it. It charted at No. 7 on the UK Dance Albums Chart. Later that year, he released "Santorini", a collaboration with house musician Smokey Bubblin' B, which appeared on the 1Forty compilation EP 1FFNG005: Funky & Garage. In 2022, his track "Daga Da" was used in an out-of-home advertising campaign for a low calorie derivative of Strongbow, a brand of cider. He then released a remix of Piri & Tommy's "On & On". In December 2022, Salute premiered their Sammy Virji collaboration "Peach" at a Boiler Room set in Melbourne. The track had been written with Salute at a writing session and had been produced by trial and error. Released in March 2023, the track appeared on Salute's EP Shield, which was released that May. The month after that, he released "Shella Verse" with Flowdan. Around this time, he undertook a headline tour, "Like a Virjin", which sold out across the UK.

In August 2023, he performed a set for DJ Mag. For this, he created a remix of "Counting" by Hamdi, which sampled Mason and Princess Superstar's "Perfect (Exceeder)", and a remix of "Goodums" by Unknown T. In May 2024, Felicity Martin of Planet Woo wrote that across his set, Virji "dips between bassline and UKG, reggae and old school house, with a megawatt smile across his face". Several clips from the show went viral on TikTok including Virji cuing in "Hot in Here" with a rubber fish in reference to a pescetarian university friend and the fire alarm going off during "Peach" due to the amount of sweat in the air. The following November, he released "If U Need It", which charted at No. 85 on the UK singles chart. He then released the singles "Hot in Here", "Moonlight", and "Summertime Blues", the last of which featured Chris Lake and Nathan Nicholson. He released his second album, Same Day Cleaning, in September 2025, featuring MJ Cole, Skepta, and Tuff Jam among others.

== Discography ==
=== Albums ===
List of albums, with selected chart positions
Title	Album details	Peak chart positions				
Title	Album details	UK	UK Indie	UK Dance	AUS	NZ
Spice Up My Life	Released: 8 May 2020; Label: Self-released; Format: CD, digital, LP	—	48	7	—	—
Same Day Cleaning	Released: 19 September 2025; Label: Capitol; Format: CD, digital, LP	21	—	1	35	26
"—" denotes a recording that did not chart.

=== EPs ===
Title	Details
We'll Be Alright	Released: 28 May 2021; Format: Digital download, streaming
Blue Breeze	Released: 2 September 2022; Format: Digital download, streaming

=== Singles ===
Singles as lead artist
Title	Year	Peak chart positions			Certifications	Album	Ref.
Title	Year	UK	UK Dance	NZ Hot	Certifications	Album	Ref.
"Anything 2 Me" (with Livsey)	2017	—	—	—			
"To the Beat"/"Uh Oh"	2017	—	—	—			
"Too Much Conversation"	2018	—	—	—			
"Falling" (with Mikey B)	2018	—	—	—			
"Find My Way Home"	2018	—	—	—	BPI: Silver		
"Believing"	2018	—	—	—			
"Shapes (Oh Will)"	2019	—	—	—			
"Show Me (VIP)" (with Hamdi)	2019	—	—	—			
"Ride It"	2019	—	—	—			
"Whippet" (with Conducta)	2019	—	—	—			
"Dance Flaw"	2020	—	—	—		Spice Up Your Life	
"Until Tomorrow"	2020	—	—	—		Spice Up Your Life	
"Spice Up My Life" (with Paige Eliza)	2020	—	—	—		Spice Up Your Life	
"Santorini" (with Smokey Bubblin' B)	2020	—	—	—		1FFNG005: Funky & Garage	
"Runaway" (with Shift K3Y)	2020	—	—	—			
"Alright" (with Lucy Virji)	2021	—	—	—		We'll Be Alright	
"Quarantine Done"	2021	—	—	—			
"Get Dumb" (with MPH)	2021	—	—	—			
"Never" (with Holy Goof)	2022	—	—	—			
"No Other" (featuring Ragga Twins)/"Pula"/"Reverence"	2022	—	—	—			
"Truth" (with Flava D)	2022	—	—	—			
"5 Star" (with Fayyaz Virji)	2022	—	—	—		Blue Breeze	
"Poolside" (with Katy Alex)	2022	—	—	—		Blue Breeze	
"Peach" (with Salute)	2023	—	—	—		Shield	
"Shella Verse" (with Flowdan)	2023	—	—	—			
"If U Need It"	2023	85	27	—	BPI: Gold		
"Hot in Here" (with Champion)	2024	—	—	—			
"Moonlight"	2024	—	—	—			
"Summertime Blues" (with Chris Lake and Nathan Nicholson)	2024	—	—	—			
"Damager" (with Interplanetary Criminal)	2024	—	—	19			
"I Guess We're Not the Same"	2025	—	—	21			
"Cops & Robbers" (with Skepta)	2025	36	9	7	BPI: Silver		
"Dis Badman" (with Champion and Irah)	2025	—	—	32			
"Talk of the Town" (with Fred Again and Reggie)	2025	18	2	3	BPI: Silver; ARIA: Gold	USB (reissue)	
"I Could Be Madonna" (with Barry Can't Swim)	2026	—	—	14			
"—" denotes a recording that did not chart.

=== Other charted songs ===
Other charted songs
Title	Year	Peak chart positions	Album
Title	Year	NZ Hot	Album
"One for the Books" (with Giggs)	2025	35	Same Day Cleaning
"Burn the River"	2025	30	Same Day Cleaning
"Match My Mood" (with Spice and Flowdan)	2025	9	Same Day Cleaning
"Dub It In" (with 33 Below)	2025	37	Same Day Cleaning

=== Remixes ===
Song	Artist	Year	Ref.
"Quick Drive"	Niko B	2020	
"Time"	Conducta, JGrrey	2021	
"On & On"	Piri & Tommy	2022	
"Goodums"	Unknown T	2023	
"Counting" (featuring Princess Superstar)	Hamdi	2024	

=== Other appearances ===
Song	Year	Album	Ref.
"Do Me a Favour"	2017	Chips N Gravy EP	
"Like That"	2017	Chips N Gravy EP	
"Oh My"	2017	Chips N Gravy EP	
