= F3miii =

Irish singer (born 2002)

- Born: 7 January 2002 (age 24); Dublin, Ireland
- Occupations: Singer; songwriter; producer
- Years active: 2020–present
- Musical career
- Genre: Alternative R&B
- Instruments: Vocals; guitar
- Label: PlantainSound

F3miii (pronounced "femi"; born 7 January 2002) is an Irish alternative R&B singer, songwriter, and producer. He became known for his breakout hit "Noble", which charted internationally in 2026.

== Early life ==
F3miii was born and raised in Dublin. He is of Nigerian descent. He grew up surrounded by music in church, while his favorite artist was Drake. He got his first guitar on his 12th birthday and taught himself to play on YouTube. He later sang in a gospel choir and joined a musical collective called GracePark.

== Career ==
F3miii began releasing music on SoundCloud where he put out his debut single, "Beautiful", in 2020. During the first years of his career, he has eschewed the album format and exclusively released music as digital singles. He has often collaborated with Irish rapper KhakiKid; the pair's first release together was "In My Head" in 2022.

F3miii released his breakout hit "Noble" in 2025; the song gained traction on TikTok and became his first entry on the UK singles chart. It performed well in several other countries, becoming also his first entry on the US Billboard Hot 100 chart.

== Discography ==
=== Singles ===
List of singles as lead artist
Title	Year
"Beautiful"	2020
"I Love You (Lullaby)"	2020
"So Good"	2021
"Hiding"	2021
"Nice to Know"	2021
"With U"	2022
"In My Head"	2022
"From Your Eyes"	2023
"Lostwithoutmaria"	2024
"Bad 4 My Health"	2024
"Say My Name"	2024
"Truth"	2025
"Ready to Go"	2025
"Splinter"	2026
"Noble"	2026
"Take a Trip"	2026
