= Those Nervous Animals =

Irish rock band

Background information
- Origin: Sligo, Ireland
- Genres: Pop
- Years active: 1981–1989; 1993 – present
- Labels: Dead Fly Records, Tara Records, Danceline, The Knock Records
- Members: Pádraig Meehan; Barry Brennan; Eddie Lee; Susan Rowland; Tom Jamieson

Those Nervous Animals is an Irish rock band from Sligo, Ireland. Formed in 1981, the original membership consisted of lead vocalist, guitarist and keyboardist Barry Brennan, guitarist Pádraig Meehan, bassist Eddie Lee and percussionist Cathal Hayden.

The band released six singles in the 1980s/early 90s, and (in 1985) a mini-album, Hyperspace!. A new album of material recorded over four decades, The Mission Sessions, was released in 2021. A number of songs from this were released as singles.

== History ==
=== Formation and early years ===
Those Nervous Animals were formed in 1976 when Pádraig Meehan met Barry Brennan as students in Sligo art college and they decided to form a band. They met bassist Eddie Lee sometime after, as Lee remembers playing a lunchtime gig with the duo in the theatre of the Regional College, Sligo (now part of the Atlantic Technological University) circa 1979-80. It was the first time Lee had ever performed in public, and lacking a bass, played a 4-stringed guitar.

According to 2005 article in The Sligo Champion, the band name was chosen following a word-play game in a Sligo restaurant, however guitarist Pádraig Meehan explained in a 1985 Evening Herald article how the name was thought up in a health shop in Sligo: "Our pattern was to get drunk and then go in for health foods the next day; somebody heavily hallucinating with drink came up with the name."

The band's songs combined funky, radio-friendly pop tunes, with quirky and ironic material. The band began to get noticed after a music demo produced in Slane won them a session with radio DJ Dave Fanning which garnered a public and commercial response. At the same time, the band were building a following through their live shows which were delivered around the country. Bassist Eddie Lee explained how the band took "a big step" in January 1984 in borrowing a sum of money, which they utilised for recording purposes rather than live gigs: "it was a choice between a decent PA rig or recording". The Evening Herald concluded that the decision had been the right one, as it produced the "excellent" debut single "Just What the Sucker Wanted", which had been recorded in Windmill Lane Studios, and produced by Bill Whelan. The song was released on their own Dead Fly label and distributed by Stoic. The band topped a number of polls for the year 1984, as reported by the The Southern Star newspaper:

Those Nervous Animal's debut single "Just What The Sucker Wanted" was voted fourth best single of 1984 in the recent Hot Press readers' poll and the band - unknown four months ago - was voted No. 2 in the "Most Promising Act" category. "Just What The Sucker Wanted" was also voted ahead of many established national and international acts in Dave Fanning's 50 All-Time Favourites by his Radio 2 listeners.

In February 1985, the band released "The Business Enterprise (My Friend John)", which went on to become their biggest Irish hit. To support the release, they performed the song on Ireland's talk show The Late Late Show on Saturday 16 February 1985. The band was originally managed and produced by Riverdance composer Bill Whelan, and took on a Friday night residency at the Baggot Inn music venue in Dublin, which began to attract a lot of interest. As of late February 1985, the Galway Tribune reported that the band's ongoing Friday night concerts at the 'Baggot Pitza Bar' in Dublin were attracting "hoardes", whilst The Sligo Champion echoed the enthusiasm, but named the same venue as the 'Baggot Pitta Bar'. The residency lasted until April 1985, at which point the band took time out from performing to work on their next single, and mini-album Hyperspace! with Whelan.

In August 1985, The Evening Herald summarised the band's recent success:

Late last autumn a six-piece Sligo band started gigging in Dublin. Between then and last April, they built up a fanatical core of supporters, released two singles, and packed one of Ireland's spawning grounds for good bands, the Baggot Inn, seven weeks running... Following the success of their second single "The Business Enterprise (My Friend John)" their producer / manager Bill Whelan has had them hard at work recording and writing material...

The band performed shows across Ireland, including events in the late 1980s in the National Stadium and Frances Xavier Hall, mostly notably the Irish Self Aid concert of May 1986. Those Nervous Animals never played or released records outside Ireland.

To celebrate the release of The Mission Sessions in March 2021, the band held an online album launch over Zoom (owing to COVID-19 restrictions), during which they reminisced about the writing and recording process of songs on the album. Bassist Eddie Lee revealed that the bassline on the song Just What The Sucker Wanted was influenced by Luther Vandross's 1981 track Never Too Much. Lee as well as other band members agreed that it was one of their only songs, or "maybe even the only track, that really sounds 80s still" due to the presence of a gated snare drum sound and gated synth, which were in common use at the time.

Lee recalled that after their performance at Self Aid in 1986, the organisers were subsequently compiling an album of all the acts who had performed that day and it was found that Pádraig Meehan's guitar part had somehow "disappeared in the mix (..) and somebody had to be called in Dublin to come in and play guitar on it.."

The band were supported in concert by Cry Before Dawn in Wexford on a number of occasions.

Singles released by the band included Just What the Sucker Wanted, The Business Enterprise (My Friend John), How Does the Shopper Feel? and Damien. They worked with a number of notable producers, including Bill Whelan, and Donal Lunny. The early singles were released on their own Dead Fly label. Some of these songs are included (remastered) on the Hyperspace! mini-album. The record label name "Dead Fly" comes from a Sligo town expression meaning smart, or street wise.

=== Band reunion ===
The three core TNA members Pádraig Meehan, Eddie Lee and Barry Brennan steered the band through a number of personnel changes over the years. This trio also contributed the songs that characterised the Animals style. Guitarist Seamie McGowan played on many of the recordings and toured with the band. Among the performers associated with the band is Clonmel keyboard player John Tobin, who played the jazz solo on How does the Shopper Feel? and the French percussionist (now deceased) Pascale Benadjoud. Susan Rowland regularly provided vocals; at various times Helen Walsh, Flo McSweeney and Maura O'Connell performed vocal backing with TNA. The band had strong associations with the Sligo pub, Hennigans of Wine Street, where they played and socialised in the 1980s.

Having toured in Ireland for a number of years the group disbanded in 1988, but since 1993 they have performed together regularly on a part-time basis. Those Nervous Animals returned with a tour and a CD Single, Rocket Ship, in 1994, on Danceline Records. In 2002 Tom Dunne of Today FM put the song The Business Enterprise (My Friend John) on his Top 30 Irish Hits Volume 2 collection. Today FM listeners voted the song number 16 among the best Irish singles of all time. In 2003 Those Nervous Animals contributed a new track - Polar Bear - to the Simpatico album, in honour of the late Finn Corrigan, musician and sound engineer. The song Hyperspace was featured on the album Quare Groove Vol.1 released in 2018 by All City Records.

=== The Mission Sessions ===
The band released their first full-length album, The Mission Sessions, on 26 March 2021. It included a 50-50 mix of remasters of older material and material recorded during the 2020 COVID-19 lockdowns. In reviewing the album, The Irish Times summarised the style of the band:

Sligo-band Those Nervous Animals are less of an anomaly now than they were in 1981. Back then (gather around me children, no pushing), they arrived on the Irish music scene with two disadvantages: they weren't from Dublin and one of the members played fretless bass (manna from heaven for sneery cognoscenti raised on a low-slung guitar diet of The Ramones and sniffing out the next U2). The songs, as well, took some time to get used to, with their tangible musicianship and familiarity with Steely Dan and Talking Heads.

In an interview with Pádraig Meehan in late 2020, Bill Whelan noted that despite the intervening decades in which the band had taken a hiatus, "Those Nervous Animals... still feels alive to me as a concept, as a uniting flag over a particular kind of creativity".

== Personnel ==
=== Current members ===
- Vocals, guitar, keyboards – Barry Brennan
- Vocals, Susan Rowland
- Guitar, keyboards – Padraig Meehan
- Bass, keyboards – Eddie Lee
- Drums – Tom Jamieson

== Discography ==
=== Mini-album ===
| Year | EP details |
|---|---|
| 1985 | Hyperspace: Released: 18 November 1985; Label: Tara Records; Formats: LP, cassette |

=== Album ===
| Year | LP details |
|---|---|
| 2021 | The Mission Sessions: Released: 26 March 2021; Label: The Knock Records; Formats: LP, digital downloads |

=== Singles ===
| Year | Single | Peak chart positions | | | | |
| Year | Single | UK | IRE | NLD | NZ | US Alt. |
|---|---|---|---|---|---|---|
| 1984 | "Just What the Sucker Wanted" | — | — | — | — | — |
| 1985 | "The Business Enterprise (My Friend John)" | — | 21 | — | — | — |
| 1986 | "How Does the Shopper Feel?" | — | — | — | — | — |
| 1986 | "Damien" | — | — | — | — | — |
| 1994 | "Rocket Ship" | — | — | — | — | — |
"—" denotes releases that did not chart or were not released in that territory.
