= The Business Enterprise (My Friend John) =

1985 single by Those Nervous Animals

Single by Those Nervous Animals

from the album The Mission Sessions
- B-side: "Rebecca"
- Released: February 1985
- Recorded: 1984–85
- Studio: Lombard and Windmill Lane Studios, Dublin
- Genre: Pop, funk, sophisti-pop
- Length: 3:47
- Label: Dead Fly Records
- Songwriters: Pádraig Meehan; Barry Brennan; Eddie Lee
- Producer: Bill Whelan

Those Nervous Animals singles chronology
"Just What the Sucker Wanted" (1983)	"The Business Enterprise (My Friend John)" (1985)	"How Does the Shopper Feel?" (1986)

"The Business Enterprise (My Friend John)" is a single released by Irish rock group Those Nervous Animals in 1985. It later appeared on their "mini-album" Hyperspace! (1986), and eventual debut studio album The Mission Sessions in 2021.

The song was the second single released by the band, after "Just What the Sucker Wanted" in 1983, and was described by The Galway Tribune as a "catchy, pop-orientated tune with excellent vocals". According to the band, the song is "often referred to" simply as 'My Friend John', but the title is actually 'The Business Enterprise', with '(My Friend John)' in parentheses.

== History ==
=== Writing and recording ===
At the time of the songs release, Those Nervous Animals were in the habit of rehearsing in The Venue pub in Strandhill, as well as The Blue Lagoon pub on the banks of the Garavogue River in Sligo (courtesy of owner Peter Henry). The Business Enterprise (My Friend John) was debuted live in The Venue, as recalled by former drummer Christy Behan in 2021. Band member Pádraig Meehan mused that, at the time, lead vocalist Barry Brennan was "in his pomp", and "could do anything (..) He loved leaving the stage and walking down through the audience...". Behan recalled that even the band members themselves never knew how Brennan would appear: "Would he have pipe cleaners in his beard or something?... He was a character, like, and a great frontman".

In a 2020 YouTube interview, guitarist Pádraig Meehan reminded band member Susan Rowland, a backing singer on the track, that the female "John" 'answer' (or response) on the song had been delivered by herself (in "a Susan moment"), an addition which he felt elevated the song. Rowland replied that she didn't know anyone else who had "carved out a career from one word... it opened so many doors."

To celebrate the release of the band's debut album The Mission Sessions in March 2021, the band held an online album launch over Zoom (owing to COVID-19 restrictions), during which they reminisced about the writing and recording process of songs on the album. Rowland recalled being "brought up to Dublin (from Sligo)" in the back of bassist Eddie Lee's van, to record My Friend John in Lombard Sound Studios. Rowland recalled herself and Lee having to position themselves "in a hot little booth (at Lombard) trying to sing all the backing vocals together and keeping them really tight", despite the height difference between the two and the single microphone. Lee confirmed that it was not just Rowland, but the two of them that had actually sung the "John" 'answer' heard in the chorus.

Rowland admitted that the song was "the one song everybody associates us with... sometimes when we'd been talking to people recently I think they just never, they don't remember anything else... it's the one big song". Lead vocalist Barry Brennan agreed, mentioning that a typical question a fan would ask would be "Who is John?". Brennan recalled that it was just an "arbitrary name", akin to "Tom, Dick and Harry", however songwriter Pádraig Meehan elaborated further upon the inspiration behind the John character:

I think... that song got written... we had hooked up with Bill Whelan and we were rehearsing in The Blue Lagoon and then out in The Venue, they were very kindly giving us the room, and I met this guy whom we all know, he used to drink in Hennigan's (bar in Sligo) and he was a writer and a poet, and unfortunately, sadly he's since passed away, and he had just set up a business and he was all dressed up in a pinstripe suit, and that really was the very start of it. I wrote a set of lines when I went home, that was the first thing, and I think I told Barry (Brennan) and Eddie (Lee), like, that I had something but they didn't... y'know at that stage I had just the verse chords on the thing. And, em, there's other Johns... There's about four people; y'know, Willie Conlon was possibly an inspiration, Johnster Barry, eh, John Rooney and this other guy... they'd be the main people that (it) would be about... a kinda composite.

Speaking to the Canadian online radio station Ceol agus Craic a year previously in March 2020, Meehan gave further information regarding the inspiration for John:

Well, that song was written after Those Nervous Animals were formed, it wasn't one of the songs that was already in existence... It, em, we had met Bill Whelan and we had done "Just What the Sucker Wanted", was already a single on our own Dead Fly label and, em, I was walkin' down the street in Sligo, down O'Connell Street, and I met a man who was a kind of, he was a writer, he was em, sort of, y'know, a guy who drank a little bit too much - a lovely man, but awful in drink, absolutely horrible. And, em... he was wearing this amazing suit, with the pinstripe, the whole lot - with a beautiful little waistcoat, and everything perfect, and cuff links and things, and his beard was trimmed and his hair looked good. And he says "Right, are you ok? I'm starting a computer business. Everything is changed in my life, y'know it's time you got yourself organised - computers are the 'in' thing, come up here and you'll see this, and buy one of these off me", y'know? I couldn't believe it, I says "This is the guy I know, I can't believe it!" and he was this sort of romantic, y'know, cursed poet, and, em, he was really the basic inspiration for writing a song about somebody who transforms. His name wasn't John. He was a poet and he was from Ballymote. He's no longer with us sadly. I mean there were other figures you could, y'know, once we got started writing it and I had written the first verse and the chorus and we rehearsed it in The Blue Lagoon, and I was in Kilkenny at the time, and, eh I phoned back the other two verses, once I wrote them, back to Barry and Eddie, so we had the last two verses (..) Lots of people were kind of, you probably remember lads, how that atmosphere, of people suddenly were becoming business heads... (during the mass-adoption of home computers)

The distinctive keyboard intro to the song was noted as having been the idea of lead singer Barry Brennan, while a distinctive guitar lick in the chorus was the work of guitarist Seamie McGowan. Cathal Hayden provided percussion, who was affectionately known by the band as "Mr. Friction". The song was mostly recorded live, with "a few overdubs". Christy Behan, who drummed on the single noted that during his time in the band, he became influenced by bands such as Talking Heads and Was (Not Was).

Bill Whelan produced the song, assisted by engineer Philip Begley (also referenced elsewhere as 'Phil Berley') for the A-side ("My Friend John") at Windmill Lane and Lombard studios, and by engineer Paul Waldron at Trend Studios for the B-side ("Rebecca"). The same recording session at Lombard produced the track "Clubs", and featured Bill Whelan on piano.

=== Artwork ===
The artwork on the single was created by Maria Murray, a graphic designer, who also worked as an animator for a company called NMW at the time. Meehan, Brennan and Lee first organised a series of meetings with Murray, during which she "listened to the music and came back with roughs". According to Meehan, "We were so impressed we said 'yes' right away and also asked her to do an animation".

Rostrum cameras were difficult to come by in Ireland of the 1980s, but Murray had an arrangement that allowed her night access to RTÉ studios in Dublin to do animation work. Although access to the studio was strictly limited, and animation in the pre-digital era required a lot of time, Murray along with her colleague Steve Wall were able to produce an animated version of the song. That print was eventually lost, although the artwork for the single as well as a poster had been preserved as of 2021, according to the band's website. Murray also designed a stage backdrop for the band, "which survived into the 1990s".

=== Success of the single ===
The Business Enterprise (My Friend John) was performed by the band on Ireland's main talk show The Late Late Show on the night of Saturday 16 February 1985. It became their highest-charting single, reaching number 21 in the Irish charts on 17 February 1985.

Following the success of U2 in the early 1980s, and their album The Unforgettable Fire in October 1984, there was a swell of interest in Irish bands and "the whole business was suddenly Ireland-centric" according to producer Bill Whelan, recalling the era in a 2020 interview. Record label scouts from England were journeying to Ireland every day in order to hear bands in the hope of capitalising on this newfound interest, and, according to Whelan, "you could virtually touch the avarice that was appearing. Now was a chance to find the next U2 and come to Ireland, and they were all coming in (..) you kind of had to fight them off...".

Within this wider context, Those Nervous Animals experienced their greatest Irish success with The Business Enterprise (My Friend John), and started to become better known nationwide, whilst also frequently playing shows at the popular Baggot Inn music venue in Dublin, where they performed a residency in the mid-80s. Whelan remembers one particular evening in 1985 when six separate A&R people had travelled from England to see the band, and the "excitement was enormous."

At the height of their popularity, the band, along with Whelan, journeyed to London to meet with Muff Winwood, head of A&R at CBS Records, who, according to Whelan represented "the real hope" they had in signing to a major label, "out of all of those record companies, and A&R men, and shysters of various sorts" who had expressed interest in the band. Following the meeting with Winwood, they all ate in an Indian restaurant afterwards, and both Whelan and Meehan agreed in hindsight "I think we all felt it was going to happen", however nothing ultimately came of it.

In 2021, bassist Eddie Lee summed up the band's feelings prior to the release of The Mission Sessions: "Our biggest regret, looking back to the 80's, was not that we didn't become pop stars, I don't think any of us were really cut out for that. It was not getting to make that album, as we always believed strongly in the originality and beauty of the songs we wrote and arranged."

Speaking to The Irish Times in March 2021, Meehan revealed his appreciation for the song, despite having grown to dislike it for a period at the band's peak: "We made a little promo video for it, and I got back into what I was talking about when I wrote the song – about transformation and things like that (..) Whereas I went through a phase of hating the bloody song. You'd be touring it and the audience would insist you play it; you'd hear people shouting for it all night; I can understand how people get sick of something. But that's all gone away now. I love it now, and I think it's a nice little piece of pop music."

=== Remastering for The Mission Sessions ===
For the 2021 release of The Mission Sessions, the band enlisted mastering engineer David Glasser in Boulder, Colorado to remaster the tracks. Glasser's work includes the restoration of materials from the birth of sound recording for the Smithsonian Folkways collection as well as The Grateful Dead back catalogue. Glasser's remastering was noted as giving the tracks "a new polish and detail".

Bassist Eddie Lee noted his appreciation for Glasser's work during the Zoom launch, opining: "For me, the difference in the remastering came out with the bass sound on My Friend John, it's just ridiculous - it just hops out of, no matter what kind of speaker you're listening to it on, it just hops out, it's really, really good".

According to a 2021 review in the Sligo Champion, "Listening to The Mission Sessions, you are time-travelling inside songs remarkably prophetic of boom and bust, wins and losses, various dramatic cultural shifts-but some ageless sense of wonder is vibrant within these grooves too." Tony Clayton-Lea of The Irish Times wrote "Tracks such as "The Business Enterprise (My Friend John)", "Insomnia", "Damien", and "Just What The Sucker Wanted" ooze varying states of funkiness - more Hall & Oates than Rip Rig + Panic - that have travelled well."

== Appraisal and legacy ==
In 2002, Tom Dunne of Today FM included the song on his Top 30 Irish Hits: Volume 2 collection. In February 2005, a Today FM listeners poll placed the song at No. 16 in the Best Irish Singles of All Time.

According to the Sligo Champion, the song typified the band's unusual approach compared to other Irish bands of the era, mixing the genres of blue-eyed soul, funk and indie "into an uncategorisable whole". Eddie Lee's bass on the song was described as "killer" by Hot Press in 2021.

On 30 March 2021, Dunne interviewed Pádraig Meehan on his Newstalk radio programme The Tom Dunne Show during which he introduced the song in the following way: "...for a whole country, this will be forever known as My Friend John, although the real name is actually The Business Enterprise..."

Irish comedian Dylan Moran chose the track as "The song that reminds me of home" in an interview with NME magazine in May 2021, explaining: "It's a really '80s sounding record and one of the lyrics is: "The business enterprise of my friend John". That reminds me of Dublin when I was young."

== Personnel ==
- Barry Brennan – lead vocals
- Pádraig Meehan – guitar
- Eddie Lee – bass, backing vocals
- Seamie McGowan – guitar
- Susan Rowland – backing vocals
- Bill Whelan – keyboards
- Christy Behan – drums
- Cathal Hayden – percussion

== See also ==
- List of one-hit wonders in Ireland

== Weekly charts ==
Chart (1985)	Peak position
Ireland (IRMA)	21
