= Brendan O'Connor (media personality) =

Irish journalist and television presenter (born 1970)

- Born: 23 January 1970 (age 56); Cork, Ireland
- Education: University College Cork (UCC)
- Occupations: Columnist, television presenter, comedian
- Employer(s): Sunday Independent, Raidió Teilifís Éireann
- Known for: "Who's in the House"; Don't Feed the Gondolas; You're a Star; The Apprentice: You're Fired!; The Saturday Night Show; Cutting Edge
- Height: 6 ft 4 in (193 cm)
- Spouse: Sarah Caden (m. 1999)
- Children: 2

Brendan O'Connor (born 23 January 1970) is an Irish media personality and former comedian. He currently presents his own self titled radio show on RTÈ Radio 1 at the weekends and writes for the Sunday Independent.

He presented the Current Affairs panel show Cutting Edge on RTÉ from 2016-2019. He also presented The Saturday Night Show on RTÉ from 2010 to 2015, and he is also known for his columns in the Sunday Independent newspaper. O'Connor is also editor of the newspaper's Life Magazine.

O'Connor's pop career included a one-hit wonder as Fr Brian & the Fun Loving Cardinals, with the comedy song "Who's in the House", reaching number 3 on the Irish charts.

O'Connor has pursued varied media career over several decades in Ireland. During the 1990s he appeared on Don't Feed the Gondolas, as well as on a number of other TV programmes. During the 2000s he served a member of the judging panel on Raidió Teilifís Éireann's (RTÉ) You're a Star TV talent contest before presenting The Apprentice: You're Fired! and The Saturday Night Show. With a salary of €228,500 in 2011, he is one of RTÉ's highest paid stars.

== Early life ==
O'Connor grew up in the Bishopstown area of Cork in County Cork. He is a past pupil of Coláiste an Spioraid Naoimh, Bishopstown, Cork. During his time there as a student, he was runner-up in the All-Ireland Schools' Debating Competition. He is also a graduate of University College Cork (UCC) — where he was Recording Secretary of the UCC Philosophical Society. He famously lost the Minutes Book of the "Golden Age" at a party.

== "Who's in the House" and Don't Feed the Gondolas ==
Initially, O'Connor attempted to become a comedian and was also a singer in a number of bands while still a student at UCC, but with limited success, including the band that eventually became the Frank and Walters. He moved to Dublin in the mid-1990s. Soon after this, he started freelance work with the Sunday Independent, one of Ireland's best-selling newspapers. At the same time he also performed a comedy routine at a well-known Dublin venue. He was noticed by TV producers from RTÉ and joined Don't Feed the Gondolas, a comedy television programme broadcast by RTÉ that ran for four seasons. O'Connor was one of the team captains on the panel, and after 2 seasons took over as host.

O'Connor, as a member of the band Fr Brian & the Fun Loving Cardinals, produced the single "Who's in the House", which spent 12 weeks on the Irish Singles Chart, peaking at number 3. The song was a novelty number that played on the popularity of the TV series Father Ted. O'Connor sang it while dressed as a trendy Roman Catholic priest (Fr Brian) and it featured such lines as:

- "The parish disco is strictly drug-free",
- "Saved their souls when he was nailed to a cross - some call him Jesus, I call him boss",
- "Who’s in the house? Jesus in the house"
- "Putting the diction back in Benediction."

The name "Fun Lovin' Cardinals" is itself a pun on the band Fun Lovin' Criminals. The character Fr Brian had appeared on Don't Feed the Gondolas, and the popularity of the song led to its release, and subsequent chart position.

== You're a Star TV talent contest ==
In 2005, O'Connor made his debut as a judge on Charity You're a Star, a charitable version of the You're a Star TV talent contest. Subsequently, he appeared as a judge on the main series of You're a Star. This was a televised talent show which selected what is deemed to be the best Irish act from among many. The winner was awarded a cash prize and groomed for a career in the entertainment industry. It had a niche following - primarily teenagers. Much of the show's popularity was attributed to the robust manner with which O'Connor treated many of the contestants - many of whom were gullible young hopefuls. He frequently evoked controversy with his comments on the show. However, on You're a Star, O'Connor claimed that he was "only saying what the people at home are thinking". The show was cancelled after the 2008 season.

== Sunday Independent column ==
In the 2000s, O'Connor strongly supported Fianna Fáil in many of his newspaper articles on Irish politics. He was also a supporter of Bertie Ahern and described him as "a great Taoiseach".

O'Connor wrote an article that regularly appeared on the bottom corner of the front page of the Sunday Independent, and edited the paper's Life magazine, a glossy supplement. His work also appeared throughout other sections of the paper, covering a broad range of subjects, including politics, travel, entertainment and gossip, particularly relating to well-known figures in Irish life.

His writing was described as shallow, erratic and, at times, racist. The Irish political magazine The Phoenix argued that O'Connor treated jokes about the elderly, Romanians, Travellers, environmentalists, anti-war protesters, Republicans and others he considered disrespectful toward the newspaper as mere comic relief.

=== Support for Bertie Ahern and Fianna Fáil ===
O'Connor frequently referred to Ahern in his articles simply and affectionately as "Bertie", though their relationship was at times tense. In August 2003, the two had a disagreement on a flight returning from Ahern's daughter's wedding in France, after Ahern declined to grant O'Connor an interview.

O'Connor also criticised Ahern on occasion. In an article for the Sunday Independent on 9 May 2004, he wrote that Ahern had knowingly promoted colleagues he knew to be corrupt, and had been slow to sanction those involved in serious, premeditated wrongdoing. In the same article, he lamented the expulsion of Beverley Flynn, a TD, from the Fianna Fáil party for a second time over corruption charges, describing her as a "class act".

O'Connor, along with Eoghan Harris, Ahern during the 2007 general election and during his appearances before the Mahon Tribunal. Ahern subsequently appointed Harris as a Senator.

As pressure grew on Ahern over revelations from the Mahon Tribunal regarding unexplained payments he had received in the 1990s, O'Connor called for the tribunal to be shut down, describing it as unaffordable and no longer serving any real public interest.

On 2 April 2008, Ahern announced he would resign as Taoiseach, a resignation that took effect on 6 May 2008. Investigations into the payments he received continued afterward.

On 19 February 2010, Fianna Fáil TD Willie O'Dea resigned as Minister for Defence after committing perjury in front of the High Court. Two days later, in his Sunday Independent column, O'Connor criticised the politicians who had called for O'Dea's resignation, particularly Green Party Senator Dan Boyle, blaming Boyle's actions for the situation.

=== Commentary on the Irish property bubble ===
O'Connor was a prominent voice in the Irish media defending high property valuations at the peak of the Irish property bubble.

On 12 November 2006, he wrote an article in the Sunday Tribune that mocked David McWilliams, one of the leading commentators warning of the risks posed by interest rate increases, oversupply, the growing gap between average wages and house prices, and high levels of personal debt.

On 21 January 2007, in an article titled "Jade Cowen and the Big Housing Bother that needs to be voted off", he urged readers not to sell their homes, arguing that conditions were as bad as they would get and that major financial decisions should not be made during a period of panic.

Weeks later, on 11 February 2007, in "Shout from the rooftops: house prices are rising", he argued that population growth, falling household size and continued job creation all pointed to a healthy property market, meaning further price rises.

In July 2007, O'Connor wrote what became his most notorious article, "The smart, ballsy guys are buying up property right now", in which he advised readers to buy property while others were reluctant to do so, and disclosed that he would himself be buying were he not already heavily invested in the market through his own home.

Following the collapse of the property market, O'Connor wrote on 14 June 2009 that, as a homeowner in negative equity himself, he wanted Central Bank of Ireland Governor John Hurley removed from his post, holding Hurley and his colleagues responsible for the state of the country's finances.

On 10 January 2010, in "No use cursing day we mounted property ladder", he reflected on the loss of the "paper millions" that had once made people feel wealthy, and criticised the cultural obsession with property ownership, along with the politicians, banks and media he believed had encouraged it.

Later that month, O'Connor grew angry during an interview when journalist Fintan O'Toole raised his July 2007 "ballsy" article, insisting that the piece had reflected a valid position at the time and that he did not regret having written it, though he acknowledged that the specific prediction had proven wrong.

In April 2010, O'Connor returned to the subject in an article titled "Let someone walk all over you...", in which he compared mortgage holders facing pressure from the banks to a person in an abusive relationship, arguing that they had absorbed so much blame and hardship that they would accept almost anything asked of them.

=== Other ===
O'Connor supported the 2003 invasion of Iraq by the United States government.

In early 2004, he angered some colleagues by strongly backing management during an industrial relations dispute over forced redundancies.

== The Saturday Night Show ==
In 2010, O'Connor began hosting TV chat programme The Saturday Night Show on RTÉ One. His controversial interview with Michael Barrymore brought him to the attention of the British press. His interview with Oliver Callan, during which the impressionist announced he was gay, brought him to the attention of the international press.

On 14 March 2015, O'Connor announced without warning live on air his resignation as host of The Saturday Night Show and that the show would finish for good at the end of that series on 30 May 2015.

== Personal life ==
O'Connor married Sarah Caden in 1999. She is also a journalist with the Sunday Independent and she is the daughter of John Caden, an independent television producer. The couple have two children, a daughter, born in early 2008, Anna and a daughter born in August 2010, Mary. O'Connor wrote about her diagnosis with Down syndrome in his Sunday Independent column in September 2010, drawing a warm response from readers.

== See also ==
- List of one-hit wonders in Ireland
