= The Apprentice: You're Fired! (Irish TV series) =

Irish TV series

The Apprentice: You're Fired! is a follow-on show to the Irish series of The Apprentice which ran for four years from 2008 to 2011 on TV3.

The show was originally hosted by Brendan O'Connor in 2008 and then by Anton Savage from 2010. Like other versions, it features a celebrity guest panel in front of a studio audience that discusses the episode just aired and the fired apprentice from that episode is also interviewed. The last episode of each series is re-titled as The Apprentice: You're Hired!, and interviews the winning apprentice in the studio.

In May 2012, TV3 announced that it would not be renewing the Apprentice for a new series. In a released statement, TV3 said it had had four successful series of The Apprentice but had decided not to renew the series for a fifth year.

In 2013, The Apprentice: You're Fired! was shown after each episode of Celebrity Apprentice Ireland, and was hosted by Anton Savage.
