= Noble (song) =

2025 single by F3miii

Single by F3miii
- Released: 26 December 2025
- Genre: Alternative R&B
- Length: 3:05
- Label: Robots & Humans; Sony UK
- Songwriter: Richard Adebusuyi
- Producer: F3miii

F3miii singles chronology
"Ready to Go" (2025)	"Noble" (2025)	"Splinter" (2026)

Music video
- "Noble" on YouTube

"Noble" is a single by Nigerian-Irish singer-songwriter F3miii, released on 26 December 2025. It became his breakout hit after going viral on the video-sharing app TikTok.

== Release and promotion ==
F3miii first teased the song on 16 December 2025, via a TikTok post, in which he described the song as influenced by the 2013-era work of Frank Ocean and Childish Gambino. The song was officially released to streaming services in Ireland and the United Kingdom on December 25, with a wider global release on the following day.

Toward the end of April 2026, the official "Noble" sound has been used in over 25,000 posts on TikTok, while the unofficial sound (attached to F3miii's original post) has played in an additional 11,300. The videos mostly consist of reactions to the song's Frank Ocean-esque electronic-infused R&B sound, as well as clips centering on the line "She has composure" from the chorus and fancams for fictional characters, namely those from season 3 of the television series Euphoria.

== Commercial performance ==
According to Luminate, the song earned 335,000 official on-demand streams in the United States during the week of 27 February – 5 March 2025. It increased to over 1.26 million official streams during the week of 20–26 March, and further climbed to 2.74 million by the 10–16 April week. On 22 April, "Noble" debuted at No. 81 on the UK singles chart, marking F3miii's first career entry.

== Charts ==
Chart performance for "Noble"
Chart (2026)	Peak position
Australia (ARIA)	23
Australia Hip Hop/R&B (ARIA)	5
Canada Hot 100 (Billboard)	35
Global 200 (Billboard)	61
Greece International (IFPI)	76
Ireland (IRMA)	25
Lithuania (AGATA)	31
New Zealand (Recorded Music NZ)	13
Norway (IFPI Norge)	65
Slovakia Singles Digital (ČNS IFPI)	78
Sweden Heatseeker (Sverigetopplistan)	4
Switzerland (Schweizer Hitparade)	72
UK Singles (Official Charts)	34
UK Hip Hop/R&B (Official Charts)	7
US Billboard Hot 100	51
US Hot R&B/Hip-Hop Songs (Billboard)	12
US Rhythmic Airplay (Billboard)	40

== Certifications ==
Certifications for "Noble"
Region	Certification	Certified units/sales
Australia (ARIA)	Gold	35,000^{‡}
Canada (Music Canada)	Platinum	80,000^{‡}
Hungary (MAHASZ)	Gold	2,000^{‡}
New Zealand (RMNZ)	2× Platinum	60,000^{‡}
^{‡} Sales+streaming figures based on certification alone.
