= Talk of the Town (Fred Again, Sammy Virji and Reggie song) =

2025 single by Fred Again, Sammy Virji and Reggie

Single by Fred Again, Sammy Virji and Reggie

from the album USB (reissue)
- Released: 3 November 2025
- Recorded: 30 October 2025
- Studio: Dublin, Ireland
- Genre: House
- Length: 3:13
- Label: Warner; Atlantic
- Songwriters: Fred Gibson; Reggie; Sammy Virji
- Producers: Darcy Lewis; Fred Again; Sammy Virji

Fred Again singles chronology
"Hardstyle 2" (2025)	"Talk of the Town" (2025)	"Beto's Horns (Fred remix)" (2025)

Sammy Virji singles chronology
"Cops & Robbers" (2025)	"Talk of the Town" (2025)

Music video
- "Talk of the Town" on YouTube

"Talk of the Town" is a song by British producers Fred Again and Sammy Virji with Irish rapper Reggie, and appears on a reissue of Fred Again's album USB (2022). It was released as a remix of Reggie's 2022 track of the same name for digital download and streaming on 3 November 2025 by Warner Music Group and Atlantic Records. Recorded in Dublin, Ireland on 30 October 2025, the song was written by the three artists, and produced by Darcy Lewis, Fred Again, and Virji.

== Background and release ==
The song was recorded and produced on 30 October 2025 during a studio session broadcast on Twitch from Dublin, Ireland, where Fred Again was joined by Irish rappers Reggie, Travy, and Elzzz to finish two new tracks, "Talk of the Town" and "Did It Again". The artists then went to Dublin's Button Factory to perform the songs at a surprise concert. Another live concert took place the following day, for around 7,000 people at Dublin's RDS Simmonscourt.

Upon release, Fred Again posted on Instagram to thank his two collaborators, Virji and Reggie, stating that it was one of those tracks he typically completes in about 27 minutes and that three elements satisfied him from start to finish. "Talk of the Town" is part of Fred Again's project, released as a reissue of his 2022 album USB, which involves releasing ten songs and performing ten concerts in ten cities worldwide.

== Composition ==
"Talk of the Town" is a remix of Reggie's 2022 song of the same name. Running for three minutes and thirteen seconds, it is a high-energy, dancefloor-ready house track rooted in both hip-hop and EDM, and based on a four-on-the-floor rhythmic structure. Putting Reggie's voice front and centre, the song features Virji's typical swing sound, with a futuristic rhythm and metallic, distorted synth weaves, letting the tension ease to get listeners moving.

== Credits and personnel ==
Credits adapted from Tidal.

- Fred Again (Fred Gibson) – songwriting, production, engineering, mastering, mixing, programming
- Sammy Virji – songwriting, production, programming
- Reggie – songwriting, vocals
- Darcy Lewis – production
- Scott Barnett – engineering

== Charts ==
=== Weekly charts ===
Weekly chart performance
Chart (2025–2026)	Peak position
Australia (ARIA)	47
Australia Dance (ARIA)	3
Ireland (IRMA)	4
Lithuania Airplay (TopHit)	10
New Zealand (Recorded Music NZ)	36
UK Singles (OCC)	18
UK Dance (OCC)	2
US Hot Dance/Electronic Songs (Billboard)	18

=== Monthly charts ===
Monthly chart performance
Chart (2025)	Peak position
Lithuania Airplay (TopHit)	27

== Certifications ==
Certifications for "Talk of the Town"
Region	Certification	Certified units/sales
Australia (ARIA)	Gold	35,000^{‡}
New Zealand (RMNZ)	Gold	15,000^{‡}
United Kingdom (BPI)	Silver	200,000^{‡}
^{‡} Sales+streaming figures based on certification alone.

== Release history ==
Release dates and formats for "Talk of the Town"
Region	Date	Format	Label	Ref.
Various	3 November 2025	Digital download; streaming	Warner UK; Atlantic UK	
United Kingdom	14 November 2025	Contemporary hit radio	Warner UK; Atlantic UK	
