= Bill Cullen (businessman) =

Irish businessman and media personality

Bill Cullen Ward
- Born: 17 February 1942 (age 84); Summerhill, Dublin, Ireland
- Occupation: Chairman of Bill Cullen Motor Group
- Partner: Jackie Lavin
- Website: Official website

William Cullen (born 17 February 1942) is an Irish businessman and media personality. He is regularly seen on RTÉ programmes such as The Late Late Show and The Frontline. Cullen was the owner of the Renault Ireland franchise until it was taken under more direct control by Renault in 2007. His 2001 autobiography, It's a Long Way from Penny Apples, covered his life growing up as a poor child in inner-city Dublin. Between 2008 and 2012, he hosted the Irish reality television series The Apprentice. His motor-trade business was put into receivership in October 2012.

== Early life ==
Born into poverty in the Summerhill area of Dublin in the 1940s, Bill Cullen was the fifth of fourteen children, seven boys and seven girls. Cullen was born in a caul (the membrane surrounding the amniotic fluid) which is considered a good luck omen within Irish folklore. His mother, Mary Darcy Cullen was a fruit seller and Cullen started trading at market stalls from a very young age. His father Billy was in the Irish Army Reserve and was for the most part unemployed, or working on the dock and getting labour that was not much for the Cullen family.

== Career ==
He finished his education with the Christian Brothers at the age of thirteen to work on the markets full-time, selling fruit, vegetables and other items. In 1956 he worked as a messenger boy at Walden's Ford Dealership and was appointed director general of the company in 1965. He went on to set up the Fairlane Motor Company in Tallaght in 1977 which he developed into the biggest Ford dealership in Ireland by 1981. In 1986, he took over the franchise for Renault car distribution from Waterford Crystal. The initial purchase price of the operation was £1, however the deal entailed taking on a debt burden of £18 million. This company became known as the Glencullen Group and the Renault distribution arm became known as Glencullen Distributors. Turnover of the business grew to €350 million at its peak, but fell to €4 million loss in 2006, an €18.6 million loss in 2007, and a further loss of €8.2 million in 2008. In April 2006 he was awarded the Chevalier de la Légion d'honneur by decree of the President of the French Republic for both his work with Renault Ireland and for his humanitarian efforts.

The Renault Ireland operation was taken into direct control by Renault S.A.S in 2006. It now operates as a subsidiary of the parent company. He continued to own Ireland's largest Renault retailer, CityGate Motor Group. It had six dealerships around the country – three of which were in Dublin. He also established and owned the Europa Academy, a training facility in Swords, County Dublin.

In October 2012, Cullen's motor-trade business was put into receivership by Ulster Bank. Cullen was said to be "very sad" at the appointment of receivers to his businesses Glencullen Holdings, which operates dealerships in Swords and Liffey Valley.

He took over the Muckross Park Hotel in Killarney in 1990 with his partner, Jackie Lavin, who is also his business partner. The hotel achieved five-star status in 2007, and – in the same year – ran at losses of €9.4 million. The Muckross hotel went into receivership in April 2013.

With the assistance of Robert "Hino" Harris, Bill Cullen in 2014 became the Dublin area dealer for SsangYong Motor Company.

=== Other business interests ===
As well as his interests in the motor and hotel industries, Cullen also holds executive positions in other areas:

In March 2009, Cullen became an Executive Editor of RSVP business magazine. He also offers his services as a paid motivational speaker to schools, colleges, and the business community.

=== Space booking ===
Cullen was booked to be one of the first passengers to take a flight into space on Richard Branson's Virgin Galactic service at a cost of €250,000. At the time, commercial passenger flights were due to commence in 2009, but actually began in 2023.

=== Media involvement ===
Cullen regularly appears in the Irish media and is considered a minor celebrity, appearing on television shows, such as The Late Late Show, Tubridy Tonight and The Restaurant on RTÉ He is often parodied by Tom Dunne on the Today FM Gift Grub comedy segment. This has led to him being referred to as 'Dr. Bill' because of his honorary doctorate. More recently in 2008, he has taken on the role as the businessman in the Irish version of TV show The Apprentice.

==== Books ====
Cullen released his autobiography entitled It's a Long Way from Penny Apples in 2002 detailing his life growing up in inner city Dublin and rising to become one of Ireland's most successful business people. Deidre Leahy of RTÉ called it a "entertaining and inspirational" book, while Pauline Ferrie of The Irish Emigrant praised Cullen's decision that all royalties from the book would be donated to the Irish Youth Foundation.

In 2005, Cullen released his second book Golden Apples: Six Simple Steps to Success in which he details principles to achieving business success. Bill Cullen took the Guinness World Record on 16 April 2005 for the largest ever book signing by signing 1849 copies in 10.5 hours in Easons, O'Connell Street. This was 32 copies more than the previous record.

==== Television ====
In June 2008, TV3 began inviting applications for an Irish version of popular television franchise The Apprentice. In the programme, Cullen takes on the role filled in the American version by Donald Trump, and in the British version by Alan Sugar. His partner Jackie Lavin also acts as a mentor to the apprentices. The show started its fourth season in October 2011; however, in May 2012, the show was cancelled for cost reasons.

== Politics ==
Cullen has donated to Fianna Fáil, an Irish political party, on a number of occasions. Glencullen Holdings made political donations during 2002 of €13,459. In 2005, he donated €9,330 to the party, which they controversially did not declare to the Standards in Public Office Commission. In 2006, his company donated €14,873 to the party. His company made further donations of €2,500 to Fianna Fáil minister Mary Hanafin in 2007.

Cullen was critical of the Green Party in government, particularly the effect the change in vehicle registration tax and motor taxation policy in July 2008 had on the Irish motor industry. He blamed the party for the collapse in new vehicle sales in 2009, saying that these changes were unnecessary. In response, the party's finance spokesperson, Dan Boyle, called the claims "hysterical and widely inaccurate".

He was also one of a number of high-profile members along with Packie Bonner and Mick Galwey of the group 'We Belong' who campaigned for a yes vote in the second Irish constitutional referendum on the Lisbon Treaty.

== Philanthropy ==
Cullen was involved in a voluntary capacity with the charity "The Irish Youth Foundation" after it was established by Norma Smurfit. The Irish Youth Foundation helps raise €1 million a year for youth projects in Ireland. All royalties from Cullen's 2002 autobiography, It's a Long Way from Penny Apples, were donated to this charity.

Cullen set up the Bill Cullen Sunshine Scholarships Fund in 2001 to assist young athletes make the transition to senior athletics while continuing their third-level education in Ireland.

== Awards and honours ==
In 1998, he was a recipient of the Lord Mayor's Award for his work with the disadvantaged young people of Dublin.

In September 2004, he was awarded the inaugural Princess Grace Humanitarian Award.

He was named Maxol Irish Motor Industry Person of the Year 2000.

He was conferred with an honorary Doctorate of Law of Maynooth University in May 2005.
