= Reggie B =

Irish rapper

- Born: 2001/2002 (age 24–25)
- Origin: Dundalk
- Genre: Drill
- Occupation: rapper

Reggie B (born 2001 or 2002) (also known as Reggie) is an Irish rapper. He is known for his 2022 single "Talk of the Town" which was remixed by Fred Again and Sammy Virji in 2025, and has been named by DJ Mag as one the pioneers of Irish drill music.

== Discography ==
Singles
Title	Year	Peak UK Singles	Peak Irish Singles
"Twap It"	2021		
"Million Ways"	2023		
"Talk of the Town"	2025	18	4
