= The Apprentice (Irish TV series) =

Irish reality TV series

- The header of The Apprentice 2009 with Bill Cullen
- Genre: Reality television series
- Created by: Mark Burnett
- Presented by: Bill Cullen
- Country of origin: Ireland
- Original language: English
- No. of series: 4
- No. of episodes: 42

Production
- Producer: Screentime ShinAwiL Productions
- Running time: 60-minute episodes

Original release
- Network: TV3
- Release: 22 September 2008 – 19 December 2011

Related
- Celebrity Apprentice Ireland

The Apprentice is an Irish reality television series, in which a group of aspiring young businessmen and women compete for the chance to win a job as "apprentice" to Bill Cullen, an Irish businessman.

The first series of the show aired on TV3 on 22 September 2008, and finished on 8 December 2008, with Brenda Shanahan as the winner. Shanahan worked at Cullen's company, Renault Ireland, on a 12-month contract worth €100,000. Steve Rayner, a Business Development Manager, won the second series in 2009. That series also featured Breffny Morgan. Michelle Massey won the job in the 2010 series, while Eugene Heary won in 2011. It was announced in May 2012 that the programme would not be renewed for a new series.

The Apprentice is modelled on the American series of the same name, which starred entrepreneur Donald Trump, but is styled more closely around the British series starring business magnate Alan, Lord Sugar.

Bill Cullen's assistants in the Irish version of The Apprentice were his partner, and former model, Jackie Lavin and PR "guru", Brian Purcell.

== Celebrity version ==
Due to the success and growth of the series in 2009, it was announced that a Celebrity version of the show was being sought by the producers and TV3. The producers began the task of finding the main sponsor for the show, celebrities to take part and finally smaller sponsors of each individual task. The producers were able to find a main sponsor for the launch of the spring show and would have started production in January or February 2010, however, they were unable to find sponsors of each individual task. The producers also ran into trouble finding different personalities for the show and for them to give up a month of their lives for the show. The production of the celebrity version of the show was postponed until the third series finished production in August 2010.

As part of TV3's 2013 Autumn Schedule, the Celebrity Apprentice Ireland launched in September 2013.

== 2011 series ==
The Apprentice Series 4 began airing on 3 October 2011. The Apprentice: You're Fired presented by Anton Savage also returned.

=== Candidates ===
The fourth series consists of sixteen candidates in total again this year. In the three previous series, the candidates were initially separated into two teams based on gender. This year, however, Bill split the teams into 'youth' and 'experience'. Four male and four female candidates made up the teams.

Candidate	Background	Original team	Age	Result
Eugene Heary	Property Developer	Zest	30	Hired by Cullen
Noel Rowland	Company Director	Zest	30	Fired in week 12
Joanne Sweeney-Burke	Multimedia Company Owner	Zest	33	Fired in week 12
Maurice O'Callaghan	Hospitality Manager	Zest	32	Fired in week 12
Conor Browne	Company Owner	Spirit	20	Fired in week 11
Sandra Murphy	Restaurateur	Zest	30	Fired in week 10
Christopher Harold	Marketing Manager with Cadpo Software Solutions	Spirit	28	Fired in week 9
Brian Kirwan	Sales & Marketing	Spirit	29	Fired in Week 8
Susanne Short	Marketing Graduate	Spirit	22	Fired in week 7
Peter Nielsen	Senior Channel Account Manager	Spirit	29	Fired in week 6
Louise O'Hara	Graduate, Masters in Marketing	Spirit	29	Fired in week 5
Claire Crone	Self Employed	Zest	35	Fired in week 4
Ruth Leggett	Construction Design Manager	Zest	40	Fired in week 3
Eoin Hamdam	I.T. Consultant	Zest	38	Quit in week 3
Yinka Rahman	Owns and runs www.hairweavon.com	Spirit	25	Fired in week 2
Aisling Smith	Marketing and Event Manager	Spirit	26	Fired in week 1

=== Weekly results ===
Candidate	Original team	Week 3 team	Week 4 team	Week 6 team	Week 8 team	Week 9 team	Week 11 team	Application result	Record as project manager
Eugene Heary	Zest	Spirit	Zest	Zest	Zest	Spirit	Spirit	Hired by Cullen	2–1 (win in weeks 10 & 11, loss in week 6)
Noel Rowland	Zest	Zest	Zest	Spirit	Spirit	Zest	Spirit	Fired in week 12	2–0 (win in weeks 4 & 8)
Joanne Sweeney-Burke	Zest	Spirit	Spirit	Zest	Spirit	Spirit	Spirit	Fired in week 12	2–1 (win in weeks 2 & 9, loss in week 7)
Maurice O'Callaghan	Zest	Zest	Spirit	Spirit	Spirit	Zest	Zest	Fired in week 12	2–1 (win in weeks 1 & 7, loss in week 10)
Conor Browne	Spirit	Zest	Zest	Zest	Spirit	Spirit	Zest	Fired in week 11	0–2 (loss in weeks 5 & 11)
Sandra Murphy	Zest	Zest	Zest	Spirit	Zest	Zest		Fired in week 10	1–1 (win in week 6, loss in week 8)
Christopher Harold	Spirit	Spirit	Spirit	Spirit	Zest	Zest		Fired in week 9	0–2 (loss in weeks 2 & 9)
Brian Kirwan	Spirit	Spirit	Spirit	Spirit	Zest			Fired in week 8	1–0 (win in week 5)
Susanne Short	Spirit	Spirit	Spirit	Zest				Fired in week 7	
Peter Nielsen	Spirit	Spirit	Zest	Zest				Fired in week 6	
Louise O'Hara	Spirit	Spirit	Zest					Fired in week 5	1–0 (win in week 3)
Claire Crone	Zest	Zest	Spirit					Fired in week 4	0–1 (loss in week 4)
Ruth Leggett	Zest	Zest						Fired in week 3	
Eoin Hamdam	Zest	Zest						Quit in week 3	0–1 (loss in week 3)
Yinka Rahman	Spirit							Fired in week 2	
Aisling Smith	Spirit							Fired in week 1	0–1 (loss in week 1)

Elimination chart
No.	Candidate	1	2	3	4	5	6	7	8	9	10	11	12
1	Eugene	IN	IN	IN	IN	BR	LOSE	IN	IN	IN	WIN	WIN	HIRED
2	Noel	IN	IN	IN	WIN	IN	IN	IN	WIN	BR	BR	IN	FIRED
3	Joanne	IN	WIN	IN	IN	IN	IN	LOSE	IN	WIN	IN	IN	FIRED
4	Maurice	WIN	IN	IN	IN	IN	IN	WIN	IN	BR	LOSE	BR	FIRED
5	Conor	BR	IN	IN	IN	LOSE	BR	BR	IN	IN	IN	FIRED	
6	Sandra	IN	IN	LOSE	IN	IN	WIN	IN	LOSE	IN	FIRED		
7	Christopher	BR	LOSE	IN	BR	IN	IN	IN	BR	FIRED			
8	Brian	IN	IN	IN	IN	WIN	IN	IN	FIRED				
9	Susanne	IN	IN	IN	BR	IN	IN	FIRED					
10	Peter	IN	IN	IN	IN	IN	FIRED						
11	Louise	IN	BR	WIN	IN	FIRED							
12	Claire	IN	IN	BR	FIRED								
13	Ruth	IN	IN	FIRED									
14	Eoin	IN	IN	LEFT									
15	Yinka	IN	FIRED										
16	Aisling	FIRED											

The contestant was hired and won the apprentice
The contestant won as project manager on his/her team
The contestant lost as project manager on his/her team
The contestant lost as sub-p.m. on his/her team
The contestant was on the winning team
The contestant was on the losing team
The contestant was brought to the final boardroom
The contestant was fired
The contestant lost as project manager and was fired
The contestant resigned and left the apprentice

=== Challenges ===
==== Week 1 ====
- Task scope: To create and name two healthy sandwiches from the Spar deli menu and select two flavours from the Vit Hit drinks to complement your diet meal and the team that achieves the most sales wins.
- Zest project manager: Maurice
- Spirit project manager: Aisling
- Results: Zest won the task, as they made the most sales. They made a profit of €266, compared to Team Spirit who made a measly profit of only €19.
- Winning team: Zest
- Losing team: Spirit
- Sent to boardroom: Aisling, Christopher and Conor.
- Fired: Aisling, for weak management and for allowing "chaos to take over".

==== Week 2 ====
- Project managers: Joanne (Zest) and Christopher (Spirit)
- Task scope: To produce a CD and design the newspaper ad campaign, the sleeve and poster. 100,000 copies of the winning CD would be given away free with the Irish Daily Mail. Each team had to pick 10 new Irish music acts to feature on the CD. The team whose CD impresses the panel of judges the most wins.
- Result: The judges were most impressed with Zest's CD and they won for the second week in a row.
- Winner: Zest
- Sent to boardroom: Christopher, Louise and Yinka
- Fired: Yinka, for making poor decisions that adversely affected Spirit's project, and for "overseeing a disaster" in her team's position despite having management experience.

==== Week 3 ====
- Team reshuffle: Eugene and Joanne moved to Spirit, Conor moved to Zest.
- Project managers: Bill appointed: Eoin (Zest) and Louise (Spirit)
- Task scope: To create an app for Uni Slim.
- Result: UniSlim found Team Spirit's app to be more suitable. And chose them as this week's winners.
- Winner: Spirit
- Quit: Eoin, after Zest's presentation, he left the competition claiming his teammates ruined everything and couldn't handle the stress anymore.
- Sent to boardroom: Sandra (deputy PM), Ruth, Claire. As deputy PM, Sandra had to choose two candidates to come back with her to the boardroom.
- Fired: Ruth, for lacking assertiveness within her team that could have changed the task's outcome, and only showing it at the most inappropriate moment: during the team's pitch itself. Bill also emphasised disappointment in the assertive issue as a result of Ruth's work background requiring those character traits.

==== Week 4 ====
- Team reshuffle: Louise, Eugene and Peter move to Zest, Maurice and Claire move to Spirit.
- Project managers: Noel (Zest) Claire (Spirit)
- Task scope: To demonstrate and design "A Show Your Business Event" for Bank of Ireland. To source local producers and their products and set up the event in Wexford and Galway.
- Result: Bank of Ireland was most impressed with Zest. They said there was "no comparison" between the two events. Zest made a profit of over €600 and won the task. This was the last time that Zest won a task.
- Winner: Zest
- Sent to boardroom: Claire, Christopher, Susanne
- Fired: Claire, for limiting the scope of her team's project, and therefore its chances of success, as a result of a desire to adhere to her self-admitted "nobler motives". It is worth mentioning that before the final boardroom scene, Claire had struggled to pick two people, saying she would go back in on her own. In addition, after Claire was fired, Bill said he "wasn't done yet" and strongly implied that a double firing would take place: but eventually allowed Christopher and Susanne to return to the house.

==== Week 5 ====
- Project managers: Bill appointed: Conor (Zest) Brian (Spirit)
- Task scope: To create an original advertising concept encouraging customers to make their homes more energy efficient with the help of B&Q. And to present the concept as a billboard, which must contain a slogan or tagline relevant to energy saving with B&Q.
- Result: Spirit won the task. Though their billboard was "simple" and Brian's management was quite poor, B&Q thought Zest's was too complicated and too old-fashioned.
- Winner: Spirit
- Sent to boardroom: Conor, Eugene and Louise
- Fired: Louise, for not showing the fighting spirit she brought to the boardroom scenarios within the tasks themselves, and for being on the losing team in the majority of the tasks involving marketing, despite her background.

==== Week 6 ====
- Team reshuffle: Susanne and Joanne move to Zest, Noel and Sandra move to Spirit.
- Project managers: Eugene (Zest) Sandra (Spirit)
- Task scope: To relaunch the Cadbury Dairymilk variant Caramello. To create a new packaging design for the Caramello wrapper and to develop a new print ad campaign to support the relaunch of the product.
- Result: Spirit won the task. This task was based on sales. Ultimately, the team with the most sales won. Zest sold €716 worth of bars and did not make any sales in the pre-arranged meetings set by Bill. Spirit sold €16,517 before the meetings and their total profit was over €53,000! ("A boardroom record", acclaimed Bill Cullen).
- Winner: Spirit
- Sent to boardroom: Eugene, Conor and Peter
- Fired: Peter, for showing lack of attention to detail and making a tiny yet critical error that Bill believed led to the failure of the task.

==== Week 7 ====
- Project managers: This week Bill gave the teams one minute to decide their project managers. They chose Joanne (Zest) Maurice (Spirit).
- Task scope: To develop a Guerrilla marketing campaign to communicate Eircom's eMobile's unlimited offering. To present the campaign in the form of a video that has the potential to go viral.
- Result: eMobile felt that Spirit completely understood the brief and therefore were this week's winners.
- Winner: Spirit
- Sent to boardroom: Joanne, Conor, Susanne
- Fired: Susanne, for her inconsistency at showing assertiveness and strength in tasks, and for continually failing to deliver in tasks relevant to her work background.

==== Week 8 ====
- Team reshuffle: Conor and Joanne move to Spirit; Sandra, Chris and Brian to move to Zest.
- Project managers: Sandra (Zest) and Noel (Spirit).
- Task scope: To create an event which engages the local community which recreates the magic unique to our local pub and which inspires consumers to raise Guinness together.
- Result: Guinness felt that there was a 'Wow' factor standing outside the pub in County Cork, but although their idea needed work Guinness will sell up the 'legend' concept, so Spirit were declared the winners.
- Winner: Spirit
- Sent to boardroom: Sandra, Brian, Christopher
- Fired: Brian, as Bill felt that he was a coaster.

==== Week 9 ====
- Team reshuffle: Maurice and Noel moved to Zest; Eugene moved to Spirit.
- Project managers: Joanne (Spirit) and Chris (Zest)
- Task scope: To create a back-of-box Kelloggs' Cornflakes fundraising campaign in aid of the National Children's Cancer Ward (St. John's Ward, Our Lady's Children's Hospital, Crumlin), along with a radio advertisement to enhance funding for social facilities targeted toward adolescent inpatients at the hospital
- Result: Although the board of directors at Crumlin Children's Hospital deemed Spirit's radio advert "disturbing" and unnecessary, Spirit's "Walk a Mile in My Shoes" campaign concept appealed to them greatly. On the other hand, Zest's radio advert proved acceptable and quite favourable by the BOD; however, their back-of-box campaign design was considered too cluttered and more child-friendly than adolescent-appealing. The BOD also didn't quite empathise with Zest's "Starsearch" concept, and so the latter team were deemed this week's losers.
- Winner: Spirit
- Sent to boardroom: Christopher, Noel, Maurice
- Fired: Christopher, primarily for being so-called "bedazzled" by Sandra during the entire task and failing to recognise her apparent faults throughout

*Episode dedicated to the memory of Hannah Bryan (1996–2011, former inpatient of Our Lady's Children's Hospital Crumlin) who appeared briefly in the programme.

==== Week 10 ====
- Project managers: Eugene (Spirit) and Maurice (Zest)
- Task scope: To create a 30-second advertisement in order to communicate the benefits of ordering takeaway food online. It was also important that the advertisement was edgy, fun and contemporary but most importantly was that the team's personalities show throughout the advertisement
- Result: While both advertisements were disappointing, Zest's was memorable for all the wrong reasons and Spirit tried to cram too much into theirs. However, Spirit were declared this week's winners by the skin of their teeth.
- Winner: Spirit
- Sent to boardroom: Maurice, Sandra and Noel
- Fired: Sandra, for not pushing her ideas in the group strong enough and for her abrupt communication style. Although she had good oration skills, Bill felt that she hadn't shone in other areas.

==== Week 11: semi-final ====
- Team reshuffle: Conor moved to Zest and Noel moved to Spirit.
- Project managers: Conor (Zest) and Eugene (Spirit)
- Task scope: The first part of the task was to sell Renault vehicles to Corporate Ireland. They had to choose three vehicles from the Renault range and convince the fleet buyers that Renault is their #1 choice for 2012. They also had to hold sales meetings with two of the leading higher drive companies and they had to host a corporate event at one of their dealerships. The second part of their challenge was to select a number of used cars, to market them through BeepBeep.ie, which was launched in 2010 by the Society of Irish Motoring Industries, to sell them and to make a profit.
- Result: Spirit made a profit of €3,491,000 from their sales and so were declared this week's winner
- Winner: Spirit
- Sent to boardroom: Conor and Maurice
- Fired: Conor, for making a bad presentation in front of the leading drive companies as well as having a poor management style. Even though Bill admired his entrepreneurial qualities and told him that he is and would make a great role model for the youth of Ireland, he saw him as a very raw talent and ready to fight for what he believes in, but decided he wasn't going to go into business with him.

==== Week 12: Finale ====
- Task scope: The final four candidates had to undergo a series of interviews (with David Bloch, Mairead Fleming, Gavin Duffy, and Sheena Cleesey) before presenting their business ideas to a room of potential clients
- Who was Sent to boardroom: All candidates
- Fired first: Maurice, for proposing an unrealistic business plan that ultimately required an investment much greater than Bill was prepared to offer.
- Fired second: Joanne, because of her obscure business plan that seemed too good to be true by Bill's advisors.
- Who was runner-up: Noel, for having another business whilst planning to launch another, and also because Bill saw him as a "quiet man" throughout the process.
- Who was hired: Eugene, for coming up with a business proposition that represented his expertise as an auctioneer.

== 2010 series ==
The 2010 series of the show began filming in July. The candidates have been spotted in locations including the Blanchardstown Shopping Centre on 9 July 2010. The Apprentice: You're Fired presented by Anton Savage, returned alongside brand new spin-off, The Apprentice: At Home featuring what has been going on in the house the contestants live together in during the competition offering further insight into their personalities and relationships. The Apprentice 2010 began on 20 September 2010 and continued for 13 weeks in total. The winner of the 2010 series was Michelle Massey.

=== Candidates ===
The third series consists of sixteen candidates in total. As with the two previous series, the candidates were initially separated into two teams based on gender. The women chose the name 'Fusion', while the men chose the name 'Elev8'. Similar to the third series of the British version, in the first task, Bill swapped the project manager of the women's team with that of the men's before commencing the task.

The candidates are:

Team 1	Team 2
Fusion	Elev8

Name	Occupation	Age*	Result
Michelle Massey	Corporate Sales Manager	28	Winner
Niamh McDonald	Marketing Coordinator	23	Runner-up
Panos Zambetakis	Senior Online Advertising Manager	33	Fired in Week 12
Will McCreevey	Financial Sales Manager	22	Fired in Week 12
Barry Caesar Hunt	Entrepreneur	32	Fired in Week 11
Jamie Moran	Property Consultant	29	Fired in Week 10
Ciara McManus	Sales Manager	34	Fired in Week 10
Dave Cashman	Events Organizer	26	Fired in Week 9
Tara Lee	Property Surveyor	24	Fired in Week 8
Nagaite Farag	Sales Agent	25	Fired in Week 7
Sarah O'Neill	PR & Communications Manager	30	Fired in Week 6
Caroline McHugh	Solicitor	26	Fired in Week 5
Kieran Walsh	Professional Poker Player/Director Family Business	28	Fired in Week 4
Niamh Humphreys	Business Account Manager	35	Fired in Week 3
David O'Byrne	Marketing Professional	27	Fired in Week 2
Cahal Heapes	Area Sales Manager	32	Fired in Week 1

* as of the date of the programme

=== Weekly results ===
Candidate	Original team	Week 3 team	Week 5 team	Week 7 team	Week 9 team	Week 10 team	Week 11 team	Application result	Record as project manager
Michelle Massey	Fusion	Elev8	Elev8	Fusion	Fusion	Fusion	Fusion	Hired by Cullen	2–0 (win in weeks 7 & 9)
Niamh McDonald	Fusion	Elev8	Fusion	Fusion	Elev8	Elev8	Elev8	Fired in week 13	2–0 (win in weeks 8 & 11)
Panos Zambetakis	Elev8	Elev8	Elev8	Elev8	Fusion	Elev8	Elev8	Fired in week 12	2–0 (win in weeks 3 & 10)
Will McCreevey	Elev8	Elev8	Fusion	Elev8	Elev8	Elev8	Elev8	Fired in week 12	0–1 (loss in week 7)
Barry Caesar Hunt	Elev8	Elev8	Fusion	Fusion	Elev8	Elev8	Fusion	Fired in week 11	0–3 (loss in weeks 5, 9 & 11)
Jamie Moran	Elev8	Fusion	Fusion	Elev8	Fusion	Fusion	Fusion	Fired in week 10	1–0 (win in week 6)
Ciara McManus	Elev8	Fusion	Fusion	Fusion	Fusion	Fusion		Fired in week 10	1–1 (win in week 1, loss in week 10)
Dave Cashman	Elev8	Elev8	Elev8	Fusion	Elev8			Fired in week 9	1–0 (win in week 4)
Tara Lee	Fusion	Fusion	Elev8	Elev8				Fired in week 8	1–1 (win in week 5, loss in week 8)
Nagaite Farag	Fusion	Fusion	Elev8	Elev8				Fired in week 7	1–0 (win in week 2)
Sarah O'Neill	Fusion	Elev8	Elev8					Fired in week 6	0–1 (loss in week 6)
Caroline McHugh	Fusion	Fusion	Fusion					Fired in week 5	0–1 (loss in week 3)
Kieran Walsh	Elev8	Fusion						Fired in week 4	0–1 (loss in week 4)
Niamh Humphreys	Fusion	Fusion						Fired in week 3	
David O'Byrne	Elev8							Fired in week 2	0–1 (loss in week 2)
Cahal Heapes	Fusion							Fired in week 1	0–1 (loss in week 1)

Elimination Chart
No.	Candidate	1	2	3	4	5	6	7	8	9	10	11	12	13
1	Michelle	IN	IN	IN	IN	IN	IN	WIN	IN	WIN	BR	BR	IN	HIRED
2	Niamh M.	IN	IN	IN	IN	IN	IN	IN	WIN	IN	IN	WIN	IN	FIRED
3	Panos	IN	IN	WIN	IN	IN	IN	BR	BR	IN	WIN	IN	FIRED	
4	Will	IN	BR	IN	IN	IN	IN	LOSE	IN	BR	IN	IN	FIRED	
5	Barry	IN	IN	IN	IN	LOSE	IN	IN	IN	LOSE	IN	FIRED		
6	Jamie	IN	BR	IN	IN	IN	WIN	IN	BR	IN	FIRED			
7	Ciara	WIN	IN	BR	BR	BR	IN	IN	IN	IN	FIRED			
8	Dave	IN	IN	IN	WIN	IN	BR	IN	IN	FIRED				
9	Tara	BR	IN	IN	BR	WIN	IN	IN	FIRED					
10	Nagaite	IN	WIN	IN	IN	IN	BR	FIRED						
11	Sarah	IN	IN	IN	IN	IN	FIRED							
12	Caroline	IN	IN	LOSE	IN	FIRED								
13	Kieran	IN	IN	IN	FIRED									
14	Niamh H.	BR	IN	FIRED										
15	David	IN	FIRED											
16	Cahal	FIRED												

The contestant was hired and won the apprentice
The contestant won as project manager on his/her team
The contestant lost as project manager on his/her team
The contestant was on the winning team
The contestant was on the losing team
The contestant was brought to the final boardroom
The contestant was fired
The contestant lost as project manager and was fired

=== Challenges ===
==== Week 1 ====
- Team reshuffle: Ciara moves to Elev8, Cahal moves to Fusion.
- Project managers: Ciara (Elev8) and Cahal (Fusion)
- Task: To sell vouchers for the Carlton hotel in two locations; Dundrum Town Centre (Elev8) and Blanchardstown Centre (Fusion). The team with the highest sales wins.
- Result: Elev8 won the task, as they made the most sales.
- Winner: Elev8
- Brought into the boardroom: Cahal, Niamh H. and Tara.
- Who was fired: Cahal, for poor leadership despite having prior experience and being in a leadership position within his job. Similar criticism was lobbied at Niamh H., but Bill ultimately decided to fire Cahal.

==== Week 2 ====
- Team reshuffle: None
- Project managers: David (Elev8) and Nagaite (Fusion)
- Task: To devise a one-day original healthy eating menu for Unislim and to create a radio ad for Unislim to be aired on Today FM, and also plan a radio ad campaign based on a €10,000 budget.
- Result: Fusion impressed the Unislim and Today FM executives and were named winners of the task.
- Winner: Fusion
- Brought into the boardroom: David, Will and Jamie.
- Who was fired: David, due to being judged to have made the biggest mistakes that led to the team's failure. Will, however, was warned after the firing to be 'very careful now'.

==== Week 3 ====
- Team reshuffle: Kieran, Ciara and Jamie move to Fusion, Sarah, Michelle and Niamh M. move to Elev8.
- Project managers: Panos (Elev8) and Caroline (Fusion)
- Task: To design a billboard campaign for Lucozade Sport lite drink.
- Result: Elev8's billboard ad was chosen by GlaxoSmithKline executives.
- Winner: Elev8
- Brought into the boardroom: Caroline, Ciara and Niamh H.
- Who was fired: Niamh H., due to continually underperforming in tasks, with Bill saying to Niamh: "you're working way below your par".

==== Week 4 ====
- Team reshuffle: None
- Project managers: Dave (Elev8) and Kieran (Fusion)
- Task: To sell DIY power tools.
- Result: Elev8 made more money on sales.
- Winner: Elev8
- Brought into the boardroom: Kieran, Ciara and Tara.
- Who was fired: Kieran, for being a poor team leader, for engaging in false advertising, and for bringing Ciara back into the boardroom instead of Caroline or Nagaite who closed 0 and 1 deals respectively. After the firing, Tara was given a strong warning by Bill, saying "don't ever try to bullsh*t me".
- Note: Ciara was sent back to the house prior to Kieran's firing, as she had been the top seller on Fusion.

==== Week 5 ====
- Team reshuffle: Tara and Nagaite move to Elev8, Barry, Niamh M. and Will move to Fusion.
- Project managers: Tara (Elev8) and Barry (Fusion)
- Task: To create a bus shelter campaign advising the public to recycle electrical goods.
- Result: Elev8 was judged to have had the better campaign.
- Winner: Elev8
- Brought into the boardroom: Barry, Ciara and Caroline.
- Who was fired: Caroline, for allowing her inexperience to shine through despite her acknowledged social skills.

==== Week 6 ====
- Team reshuffle: None
- Project managers: Sarah (Elev8) and Jamie (Fusion)
- Task: To design and create a calendar for the Ford Fiesta.
- Result: Fusion's calendar impressed the Ford executives more, despite missing the month of December and that the team used a picture of a minor without asking for identification.
- Winner: Fusion
- Brought into the boardroom: Sarah, Dave and Nagaite.
- Who was fired: Sarah, for being the project manager on an ultimately unsatisfactory creative project; despite Bill claiming Dave's performance on the task was very poor.

==== Week 7 ====
- Team reshuffle: Michelle and Dave move to Fusion, Will and Jamie move to Elev8.
- Project managers: Michelle (Fusion) and Will (Elev8)
- Task: To create a Cadbury spots v. stripes games event in a local community.
- Result: Fusion's event was judged the winner by Cadbury executives.
- Winner: Fusion
- Brought into the boardroom: Will, Panos and Nagaite.
- Who was fired: Nagaite, for her indecisiveness in the boardroom and ultimately failing to 'fill the boxes' that Bill required in his Apprentice.

==== Week 8 ====
- Team reshuffle: None
- Project managers: Niamh M. (Fusion) and Tara (Elev8)
- Task: To create a viral marketing campaign for Appleby jewellers.
- Result: Fusion's viral was voted by Appleby staff to be the winner.
- Winner: Fusion
- Brought into the boardroom: Tara, Jamie and Panos.
- Who was fired: Tara, for overly criticising her fellow team members in the boardroom, and for lacking maturity and experience.

==== Week 9 ====
- Team reshuffle: Panos and Jamie move to Fusion, Barry, Niamh M. and Dave move to Elev8.
- Project managers: Michelle (Fusion) and Barry (Elev8)
- Task: To source an Irish product and create a marketing campaign for the product for Spar Ireland.
- Result: Fusion's product and campaign was judged the winner by Spar executives.
- Winner: Fusion
- Brought into the boardroom: Barry, Dave and Will.
- Who was fired: Dave, for failing to live up to the credentials in his CV and for not convincing Bill he could bring more 'to the table' compared to the other two candidates.

==== Week 10 ====
- Team reshuffle: Panos moves to Elev8.
- Project managers: Ciara (Fusion) and Panos (Elev8)
- Task: To create a 30-second cinema advert for a coffee machine.
- Result: Elev8's advert was judged the winner.
- Winner: Elev8
- Brought into the boardroom: Ciara, Jamie and Michelle.
- Who was fired first: Ciara, for 'rubbing people up the wrong way' on the task, failing to improve her skills within a team, and for being in the final boardroom too many times.
- Who was fired second: Jamie, for maintaining his lack of positivity and dismissive nature throughout the tasks. Bill was also indicating he was considering firing Michelle as well, but he allowed her to stay.

==== Week 11 ====
- Team reshuffle: Barry moves to Fusion.
- Project managers: Niamh M. (Elev8) and Barry (Fusion)
- Task: To create a website concept for Carry Out Off Licences mainly targeting a female audience and to give a wine tasting presentation on their concepts.
- Result: Elev8 won the task, as they made a clear presentation and targeted the audience given in the briefing.
- Winner: Elev8
- Brought into the boardroom: Barry and Michelle.
- Who was fired: Barry, for lacking focus on the task and his unimpressive comments in the boardroom. Bill believed Barry had an issue with working with women, especially after him treating Michelle poorly on the task.

==== Week 12: semi-final ====
- Team reshuffle: No teams
- Project managers: None
- Task: Final four candidates were interviewed by Bill Cullen's experts: David Bloch (MD at Brightwater Recruitment), Mairead Fleming (Brightwater Recruitment), Gavin Duffy and a well known psychiatrist.
- Brought into the boardroom: All candidates
- Who was fired first: Will, for delivering an unprofessional CV, and lacking a little too much in experience; despite his strong selling abilities.
- Who was fired second: Panos, for failing to compensate for his promising CV through lack of energy and plateauing performances over the tasks.

==== Week 13: Finale ====
- Project Managers: Niamh M. and Michelle
- Task: Gala Marketing and Sales Promotion for 6 well known Irish Brands
- Recruits: Niamh M.'s team consisted of Barry, Will, Kieran and Niamh H. while Michelle's team consisted of Tara, Jamie, Panos and Dave
- Fired: Niamh M., Bill thinks that Niamh M.'s hand may need to be held and that she needs to be more polished
- Hired: Michelle

== 2009 series ==
After the success of the first series, TV3 announced that the show would return for another series. The second series started broadcasting on Monday, 21 September 2009. In addition to the main show, an official after show called The Apprentice: You're Fired! started this series. The winner of the 2009 series was Steve Rayner.

=== Candidates ===
There were fourteen candidates taking part in the second series and initially they were separated into two teams based on gender, Bill later switches around the personnel on these teams. The women chose the name Platinum, while the men chose the name Cúchulainn.

The candidates are:

Team 1	Team 2
Platinum	Cúchulainn

Name	Occupation	Age*	Result
Steve Rayner	Senior Account Manager	30	Winner
Stephen Higgins	Company Director	25	Runner-up
Geraldine O'Callaghan	Company Owner	26	Fired in Week 12 : semi-finals
Lucinda Kelly	Telecommunications Online Manager	29	Fired in week 11
Aoiffe Madden	Marketing Manager	25	Fired in week 10
Breffny Morgan	Harvard Graduate	23	Fired in Week 9
Ruth O'Dowd	Marketing Manager	30	Fired in Week 8
Samantha Conroy	Secondary School Teacher	32	Fired in Week 7
Brenden Moore	Entrepreneur	23	Fired in Week 6
Maria Loughran	Financial Product Manager	33	Fired in Week 5
Jennifer Quinn	Environmental Engineer	27	Fired in Week 4
Setanta Landers	Tax Consultant	27	Fired in Week 3
Donal Proctor	Building Services Engineer	30	Fired in Week 2
Craig Butler	Retail Business Developer	25	Fired in Week 1

* as of the date of the programme

=== Weekly Results ===
Candidate	Original team	Week 3 team	Week 4 team	Week 5 team	Week 6 team	Week 10 team	Week 11 team	Application result	Record as project manager
Steve Rayner	Cúchulainn	Cúchulainn	Cúchulainn	Cúchulainn	Platinum	Cúchulainn	Cúchulainn	Hired by Cullen	2–1 (win in weeks 6 & 8, loss in week 10)
Stephen Higgins	Cúchulainn	Cúchulainn	Platinum	Platinum	Platinum	Platinum	Platinum	Fired in week 13	1–1 (win in week 4, loss in week 9)
Geraldine O'Callaghan	Platinum	Platinum	Cúchulainn	Cúchulainn	Cúchulainn	Platinum	Platinum	Fired in week 12	2–1 (win in weeks 2 & 9, loss in week 7)
Lucinda Kelly	Platinum	Cúchulainn	Cúchulainn	Platinum	Platinum	Platinum	Cúchulainn	Fired in week 11	2–1 (win in weeks 2 & 10, loss in week 11)
Aoiffe Madden	Platinum	Platinum	Platinum	Platinum	Cúchulainn	Cúchulainn		Fired in week 10	1–1 (win in week 5, loss in week 8)
Breffny Morgan	Cúchulainn	Cúchulainn	Cúchulainn	Cúchulainn	Cúchulainn			Fired in week 9	2–0 (win in weeks 3 & 7)
Ruth O'Dowd	Platinum	Platinum	Platinum	Platinum	Cúchulainn			Fired in week 8	1–0 (win in week 1)
Samantha Conroy	Platinum	Cúchulainn	Cúchulainn	Cúchulainn	Platinum			Fired in week 7	0–1 (loss in week 7)
Brenden Moore	Cúchulainn	Platinum	Platinum	Platinum	Cúchulainn			Fired in week 6	0–1 (loss in week 6)
Maria Loughran	Platinum	Cúchulainn	Cúchulainn	Cúchulainn				Fired in week 5	0–1 (loss in week 5)
Jennifer Quinn	Platinum	Platinum	Platinum					Fired in week 4	0–1 (loss in week 4)
Setanta Landers	Cúchulainn	Platinum						Fired in week 3	0–1 (loss in week 3)
Donal Proctor	Cúchulainn							Fired in week 2	
Craig Butler	Cúchulainn							Fired in week 1	0–1 (loss in week 1)

Elimination Chart
No.	Candidate	1	2	3	4	5	6	7	8	9	10	11	12	13
1	Steve	IN	IN	IN	IN	BR	WIN	BR	WIN	IN	LOSE	BR	IN	HIRED
2	Stephen	IN	LOSE	IN	IN	IN	IN	BR	IN	WIN	IN	WIN	IN	FIRED
3	Geraldine	IN	IN	BR	WIN	IN	IN	IN	BR	LOSE	IN	IN	FIRED	
4	Lucinda	IN	WIN	IN	IN	IN	IN	IN	IN	IN	WIN	FIRED		
5	Aoiffe	IN	IN	IN	BR	WIN	BR	IN	LOSE	BR	FIRED			
6	Breffny	BR	BR	WIN	IN	IN	BR	WIN	IN	FIRED				
7	Ruth	WIN	IN	BR	IN	IN	IN	IN	FIRED					
8	Samantha	IN	IN	IN	IN	BR	IN	FIRED						
9	Brendan	IN	IN	IN	BR	IN	FIRED							
10	Maria	IN	IN	IN	IN	FIRED								
11	Jennifer	IN	IN	IN	FIRED									
12	Setanta	IN	IN	FIRED										
13	Donal	BR	FIRED											
14	Craig	FIRED												

The contestant was hired and won the apprentice
The contestant won as project manager on his/her team
The contestant lost as project manager on his/her team
The contestant was on the winning team
The contestant was on the losing team
The contestant was brought to the final boardroom
The contestant was fired
The contestant lost as project manager and was fired

=== Challenges ===
==== Week 1 ====
- Project managers: Ruth (Platinum) and Craig (Cúchulainn)
- Task: To sell HB Icecream in Dublin city centre. The team that makes the most profit wins.
- Result: Team Platinum won the task, as they make the most profit.
- Winner: Platinum
- Brought into the boardroom: Craig (PM), Breffny, Donal.
- Who was fired: Craig, for poor team leadership and poor defence in the boardroom.

==== Week 2 ====
- Project managers: Lucinda (Platinum) and Stephen (Cúchulainn)
- Task: To create an advert for the newly released Samsung Jet mobile phone.
- Result: Team Platinum won the task, as Bill Cullen selected.
- Winner: Platinum
- Brought into the boardroom: Stephen (PM), Breffny, Donal.
- Who was fired: Donal, for his small contribution to the task, not working as a team player, and for appearing in the boardroom for the second time.

==== Week 3 ====
- Team reshuffle: Lucinda, Maria, and Sam move to Cuchulainn. Setanta and Brendan move to Platinum.
- Project managers: Breffny (Cúchulainn) and Setanta (Platinum)
- Task: To develop and Pitch a media campaign for software company, The Big Red Book.
- Result: Team Cúchulainn won the task, as officials from 'The Big Red Book' decided the winner.
- Winner: Cúchulainn
- Brought into the boardroom: Setanta (PM), Geraldine, Ruth.
- Who was fired: Setanta, for making bad decisions with the visual element of the campaign, not showing any leadership skills, and arguably for bringing Geraldine back in the boardroom instead of Brendan.

==== Week 4 ====
- Team reshuffle: Geraldine moves to Cuchalinn. Stephen moves to Platinum.
- Project managers: Geraldine (Cúchulainn) and Jennifer (Platinum)
- Task: To take a run-down rental property of current equal rental value and transform them using products bought from B&Q. Both teams were given €2,500 to spend.
- Winner: Cúchulainn
- Brought into the boardroom: Jennifer (PM), Brendan, Aoiffe.
- Who was fired: Jennifer, for her bad management skills and for poor product choice. It has been argued that Brendan seemed better suited to lead this task instead of Jennifer to the extent where Bill criticised Brendan for not putting himself forward as team leader considering his expertise.

==== Week 5 ====
- Team reshuffle: Lucinda moves to Platinum.
- Project managers: Maria (Cúchulainn) and Aoife (Platinum)
- Task: To create an advertisement to promote Meteor Broadband To Go in order to raise awareness and to drive sales of the product.
- Winner: Platinum
- Brought into the boardroom: Maria (PM), Steve, Sam.
- Who was fired: Maria, for not controlling her teammates and for not bringing Breffny back into the boardroom.

==== Week 6 ====
- Team reshuffle: Ruth, Brendan, and Aoiffe move to Cuchulainn. Steve and Sam move to Platinum.
- Project managers: Brendan (Cúchulainn) and Steve (Platinum)
- Task: To create a unique Christmas themed product and the winning product will be onsale in over 470 Spar supermarket stores and all profits will go to the charity Turning The Tide of Suicide.
- Winner: Platinum
- Brought into the boardroom: Brendan (PM), Breffny, Aoiffe.
- Who was fired: Brendan, for making bad decisions with the product, for failing to control the prices and for not bringing Ruth back into the boardroom.

==== Week 7 ====
- Project managers: Sam (Platinum) and Breffny (Cúchulainn) (named by Bill)
- Task: To create a new Cadbury's chocolate bar with an Irish twist.
- Result: Team Cúchulainn won the task, as Bill Cullen selected.
- Winner: Cúchulainn
- Brought into the boardroom: Sam, Stephen and Steve.
- Who was fired: Sam, for making immature decisions in the tasks, and for not having the necessary experience.
- Note: Like in the Irish Apprentice, in the UK version of Week 7 in Series 2, the surviving candidates in this week's firing line are the two finalists. Coincidentally, the candidate who is fired in this episode also has a name that begins with "Sam".

==== Week 8 ====
- Project managers: Steve (Platinum) and Aoiffe (Cúchulainn)
- Task: To create a device to measure alcohol units.
- Winner: Platinum
- Brought into the boardroom: Aoiffe (PM), Geraldine and Ruth.
- Who was fired: Ruth, for repeatedly making mistakes with the product's costs, not putting forward her experience, and because Bill didn't think she had good people skills.

==== Week 9 ====
- Project managers: Stephen (Platinum) and Geraldine (Cúchulainn)
- Task: To sell nasal strips to pharmacies and gyms.
- Winner: Platinum
- Brought into the boardroom: Geraldine (PM), Aoiffe, and Breffny.
- Who was fired: Breffny, for accepting Geraldine's offer to close one of her deals, and because Bill thought he was lucky to get this far in the process.

==== Week 10 ====
- Team reshuffle: Geraldine moves to Platinum. Steve moves to Cuchulainn.
- Project managers: Steve (Cúchulainn) and Lucinda (Platinum)
- Task: To promote and present an expo on Microsoft Office Live.
- Winner: Platinum
- Brought into the boardroom: Steve (PM) and Aoiffe
- Who was fired: Aoiffe, for not putting forward her creativity, admitting she's not a salesman, and because Bill thought she wasn't exceptionally good at one thing in particular.

==== Week 11 ====
- Team reshuffle: Lucinda moves to Cuchulainn.
- Project managers: Stephen (Platinum) and Lucinda (Cúchulainn)
- Task: To make a 30-second radio advertisement and a 2-page magazine advertisement for Appleby Jewellery.
- Result: Team Platinum chosen by client.
- Winner: Platinum
- Brought into the boardroom: Lucinda (PM) and Steve
- Who was fired: Lucinda, because although she had the best record out of the 4 remaining candidates, Bill thought she was "too nice" to come and work for him.

==== Week 12: semi-final ====
- Project managers: As this is a job interview, there are no project managers.
- Task: To face tough job interviews by Bill's experts: David Bloch, Mairead Fleming, Gavin Duffy and Sheena Cleesey.
- Result: The interviewers felt that Stephen Higgins was the most impressive candidate out of the remaining 3 in terms of entrepreneurship. However, his CV was filled with exaggerations, and he wasn't shown to be a trustworthy teammate due to his arrogance and his self-preserved agendas. Although he appeared as a tough guy, he didn't come across with a lot of self-esteem. Geraldine was thought to be the most likeable candidate who appeared with the most determination and a good capacity to learn and develop. The problems the interviewers found with Geraldine included her distracting profile in her CV which included spelling errors, and that she didn't seem capable enough to deliver results at the level Bill wanted due to her inexperience. Steve Rayner was described as a world-class salesman. Although he has exceptionally good skills selling face to face, it was argued about whether he could rise to a much more senior position in the field of sales. Steve couldn't prove this in his CV or in the interviews (particularly to David), but it was said that he did come across with the potential to do so. It was also said that hiring Steve would be a risk because it was revealed that he had problems with alcohol and gambling addictions in his background.
- Who was fired: Geraldine, because Bill thought she had much more to learn.

==== Week 13: The Grand Finale ====
- Project managers: Steve and Stephen
- Task: Ford Fiesta Launch
- Recruits: Maria, Sam, Breffny, Aoiffe, Brendan, Lucinda, Geraldine and Setanta were brought back to help Stephen and Steve. Stephen chose Aoiffe, Sam, Breffny, and Setanta. Steve chose Lucinda, Geraldine, Brendan, and Maria.
- Result: Bill surmises that sales are the lifeblood of every business, and this more than anything else convinces him to hire Steve as his Apprentice.
- Who was fired: Stephen
- Who was hired: Steve

== 2008 series ==
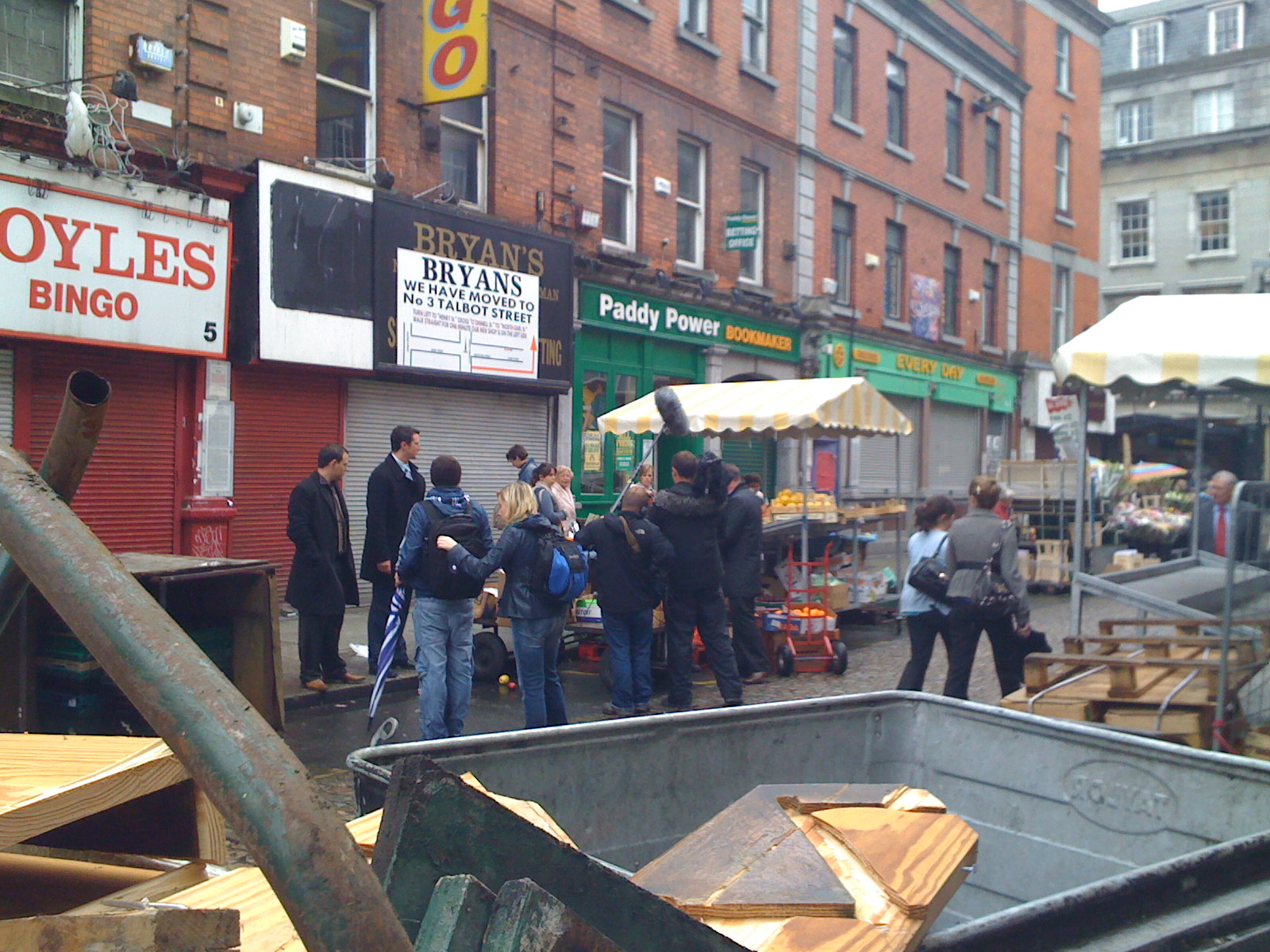
Filming of the 2008 series on Moore Street in Dublin.

=== Candidates ===
There were fourteen candidates taking part in the series and initially they were separated into two teams based on gender. The women chose the name Phoenix, while the men chose the name Dynamo.

The candidates are:

Team 1	Team 2
Phoenix	Dynamo

Name	Occupation	Age*	Result
Brenda Shanahan	Bridal Shop Owner	32	Winner
Nicky O'Callaghan	Auctioneer	26	Runner up
Stuart Butler	Business Development Manager	31	Fired in Week 11
Orla Power	Marketing Manager	34	Fired in Week 11
Shane Davey	National Account Manager	29	Fired in Week 10
Sarah Cowley	Advertising Sales Manager	32	Fired in Week 9
Paddy O'Dea	Senior Sales Executive	26	Fired in Week 8
Joanna Murphy	Sales Director	37	Fired in Week 7
Mark O'Rourke	Company Director	26	Fired in Week 6
Orla McAdam	Medical Sales Representative	24	Fired in Week 5
Avril Daly	Recruitment Consultant	24	Fired in Week 4
Ronan Whitty	Yield Analyst	27	Fired in Week 3
Derek Ramsey	Regional Sales Manager	26	Fired in Week 2
David Neary	Assistant Brand Manager	25	Fired in Week 1

* as of the date of the programme

=== Challenges ===
==== Week 1 ====
- Project managers: Joanna (Phoenix) and Mark (Dynamo)
- Task: To sell fresh fruit on Moore Street in Dublin city centre. The team that makes the most profit wins.
- Result: Both teams were given €350 to start with. Team Phoenix won the task by a margin of €15.
- Winner: Phoenix
- Brought into the boardroom: Mark (PM), David, Ronan
- Who was fired: David, for being a weak seller and for remaining in the "high grass" throughout the task.

==== Week 2 ====
- Project managers: Orla Power (Phoenix) and Ronan (Dynamo)
- Task: To organise the launch party of a new computer game. The team that impresses Electronic Arts most wins.
- Result: Phoenix impressed the EA executives and were named winners of the task.
- Winner: Phoenix
- Brought into the boardroom: Ronan (PM), Derek, Mark
- Who was fired: Derek, for allegations that he contributed minimally to the task, and for allowing indirect advertising for the Adidas brand to distract from the focus on Electronic Arts.

==== Week 3 ====
- Team reshuffle: Brenda, Orla P and Sarah move to Dynamo, Ronan and Stuart move to Phoenix.
- Project managers: Avril (Phoenix) and Shane (Dynamo)
- Task: To organise a 30th birthday party for Supermacs. The team who most improved profits were the winners.
- Result: Dynamo most improved profits.
- Winner: Dynamo
- Brought into the boardroom: Avril (PM), Stuart, Ronan
- Who was fired: Ronan, for being in the boardroom three times in a row, and for being too much of a strategist rather than a salesperson.

==== Week 4 ====
- Project managers: Orla M (Phoenix) and Brenda (Dynamo)
- Task: Design a "Personal Loan Card" for Blue Cube Loans, and sell the concept of the Card to three retailers. The team who most impresses the three retailers wins.
- Result: Dynamo chosen by all three retailers.
- Winner: Dynamo
- Brought into the boardroom: Orla M (PM), Avril, Joanna
- Who was fired: Avril, for making too many excuses and for admitting she wanted to "cover her ass" during the task.

==== Week 5 ====
- Team reshuffle: Joanna and Nicky move to Dynamo, Brenda, Sarah and Shane move to Phoenix.
- Project managers: Stuart (Phoenix) and Paddy (Dynamo)
- Task: Shoot and edit a 45-second TV commercial for "The Elysian" development in Cork City. The team who most impresses Michael O'Flynn (chairman and managing director of said development) wins.
- Result: Dynamo chosen by Michael O'Flynn.
- Winner: Dynamo
- Brought into the boardroom: Stuart (PM), Orla M, Shane
- Who was fired: Orla M, for her continual lack of assertiveness, and for not being enough of a 'fighter' to work for Bill Cullen.
- Notes: Shane was called back to the boardroom by Stuart. However, Bill recognised Shane's efforts to stand up for Stuart during the presentation earlier in the day, and instantly sent him back to the house, thus rendering him safe.

==== Week 6 ====
- Project managers: Sarah (Phoenix) and Nicky (Dynamo)
- Task: Presentation launch of the new 2009 Renault range, and to secure as many sales of used and new cars as possible.
- Result: Both teams had "solid presentations", but Phoenix sold more cars.
- Winner: Phoenix
- Brought into the boardroom: Nicky (PM), Joanna, Mark
- Who was fired: Mark, for giving a disappointing performance on the task despite being acknowledged for his grafting skills.

==== Week 7 ====
- Project managers: Shane (Phoenix) and Joanna (Dynamo)
- Task: Organize a WEEE collection day. The team with the most recycled appliances wins
- Result: Phoenix were declared winners. Joanna was challenged with (and admitted) cheating – by emailing friends and neighbours and arranging for them to bring items from a nearby recycling centre.
- Winner: Phoenix
- Brought into the boardroom: Joanna (PM), Nicky, Orla P
- Who was fired: Joanna. Bill accused her of acting unfairly to her fellow candidates, and for undermining Bill himself, through her cheating during the task.

==== Week 8 ====
- Project managers: Orla P (Dynamo) and Brenda (Phoenix)
- Task: Develop a new brand for "Travel Value Shopping" outlets of Dublin Airport Authority.
- Result: Phoenix won by default (Dynamo's selected brand name is already a registered company name).
- Winner: Phoenix
- Brought into the boardroom: Orla P (PM), Paddy and Nicky
- Who was fired: Paddy, for lacking in assertiveness, and for allowing the task going on around him to fail.

==== Week 9 ====
- Team reshuffle: Brenda and Stuart move to Dynamo, Orla P moves to Phoenix.
- Project managers: Nicky (Dynamo) and Sarah (Phoenix)
- Task: Sell Garmin products across Dublin to make the most profits
- Result: Team Dynamo had the most profits
- Winner: Dynamo
- Brought into the boardroom: Sarah (PM), Shane, Orla P
- Who was fired: Sarah, for making poor decisions as Project Manager and for failing to sell.

==== Week 10 ====
- Project managers: Stuart (Dynamo) and Orla P (Phoenix)
- Task: Create a new marketing campaign for Appleby Jewellers, in order to attract customers for the Christmas period.
- Result: Joe Appleby and Eileen Gould of Appleby favoured Dynamo's photo album idea over Phoenix's Christmas tree decoration.
- Winner: Dynamo
- Brought into the boardroom: Orla P (PM), Shane
- Who was fired: Shane, for admitting in the boardroom that his chances of winning the competition were "infinitely further away" than he thought and for believing that Bill was not going to hire him, which led to Bill firing him for lack of commitment to the competition.

==== Week 11: semi-final ====
- Semi-finalists: Brenda, Nicky, Orla P, Stuart
- Task: The four remaining candidates undergo a sequence of intense interviews by three of Bill Cullen's business colleagues.
- Result: Brenda and Nicky through to the final.
- Who was fired (1st): Orla P, for not being a good team player, and for lack of attention to detail.
- Who was fired (2nd): Stuart, for not having the required skill set for Bill Cullen in the "context" of what he needed.

==== Week 12: The Grand Finale ====
- Finalists: Brenda, Nicky
- Task: Raise money for an assigned charity, at a Charity Gala Dinner. Both finalists enlist the help of three of the previously fired candidates.
- Teams: Brenda chose Stuart and the two Orlas; Nicky chose Mark, Paddy and Sarah.
- Result: There was very little in the difference of amounts raised for their charities with Brenda slightly ahead of Nicky in the end. Although Bill questioned Brenda's team management skills noting that some of her energy had dwindled in the final task – he felt compelled to hire her because of her constant performance throughout the series. Bill gave Nicky credit for being a great contestant and said that he had no doubt that she would be picked up by a company.
- Who was hired: Brenda. Although Bill was impressed with both candidates, he wanted someone who would be able to 'hit the ground running'.

Elimination Chart
No.	Candidate	1	2	3	4	5	6	7	8	9	10	11	12
1	Brenda	IN	IN	IN	WIN	IN	IN	IN	WIN	IN	IN	IN	HIRED
2	Nicky	IN	IN	IN	IN	IN	LOSE	BR	BR	WIN	IN	IN	FIRED
3	Stuart	IN	IN	BR	IN	LOSE	IN	IN	IN	IN	WIN	FIRED	
4	Orla P.	IN	WIN	IN	IN	IN	IN	BR	LOSE	BR	LOSE	FIRED	
5	Shane	IN	IN	WIN	IN	BR	IN	WIN	IN	BR	FIRED		
6	Sarah	IN	IN	IN	IN	IN	WIN	IN	IN	FIRED			
7	Paddy	IN	IN	IN	IN	WIN	IN	IN	FIRED				
8	Joanna	WIN	IN	IN	BR	IN	BR	FIRED					
9	Mark	LOSE	BR	IN	IN	IN	FIRED						
10	Orla M.	IN	IN	IN	LOSE	FIRED							
11	Avril	IN	IN	LOSE	FIRED								
12	Ronan	BR	LOSE	FIRED									
13	Derek	IN	FIRED										
14	David	FIRED											

The contestant was hired and won the apprentice
The contestant won as project manager on his/her team
The contestant lost as project manager on his/her team
The contestant was on the winning team
The contestant was on the losing team
The contestant was brought to the final boardroom
The contestant was fired
The contestant lost as project manager and was fired
