= The Sligo Champion =

Irish newspaper

- Type: Weekly newspaper
- Format: Tabloid
- Owner(s): Mediahuis Ireland, a subsidiary of Mediahuis
- Editor-in-chief: Paul Deering
- Founded: 1836
- Headquarters: Sligo, County Sligo, Ireland
- Circulation: No longer ABC audited
- Website: www.sligochampion.ie

The Sligo Champion is a weekly regional newspaper published every Wednesday in Sligo, Ireland. It was purchased by Independent News & Media (INM) in 2008. In a 2011 article in the Irish Independent, also owned by INM, it was described as one of Ireland's "leading regional newspaper[s]". The newspaper contains local news about County Sligo and surrounding counties, including neighbouring parts of Counties Leitrim and Roscommon.

== History ==
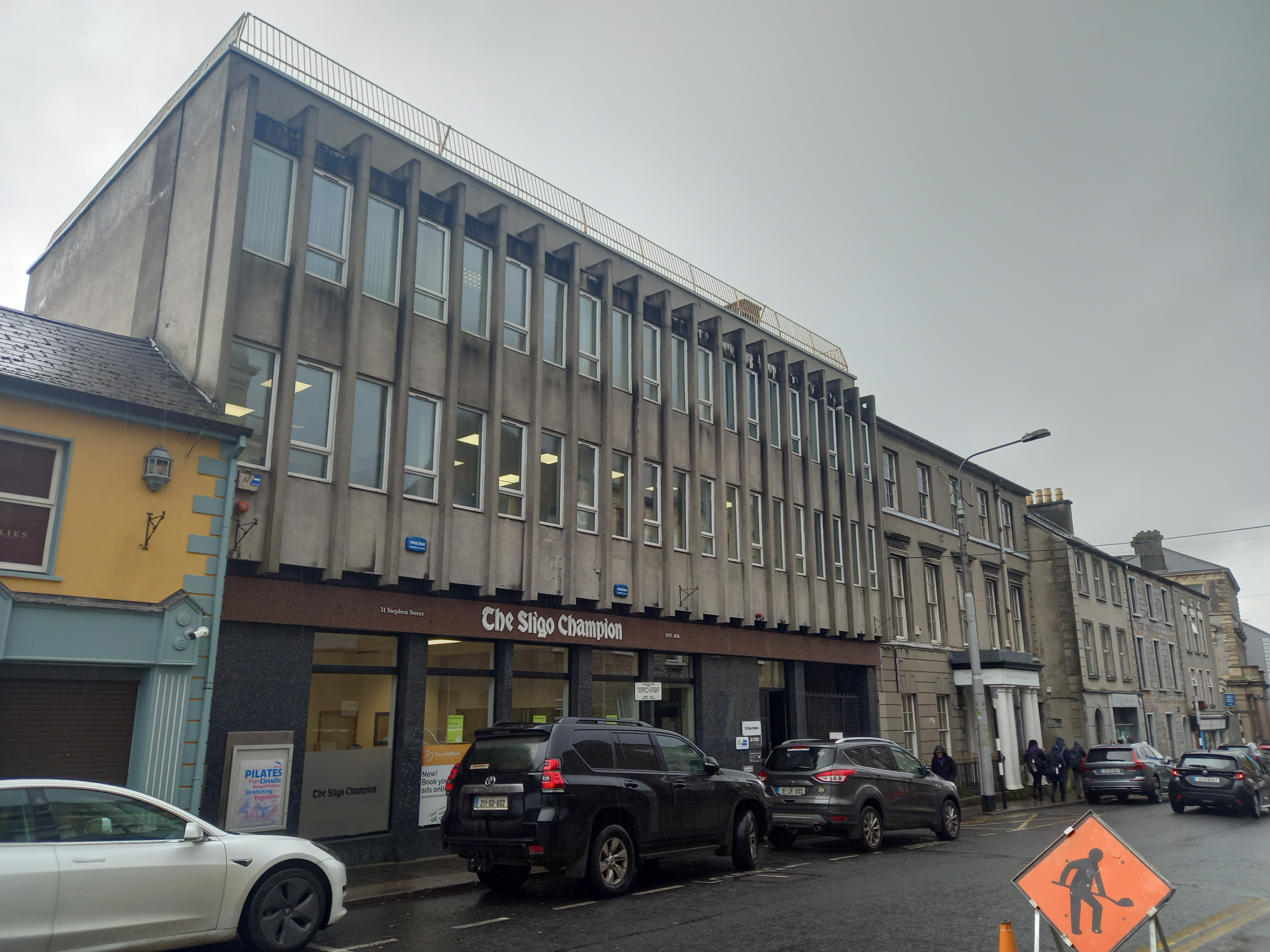
The Sligo Champion offices on Stephen Street, Sligo.

The Sligo Champion was founded in 1836. The first edition was published on 4 June 1836. It was acquired by Independent News & Media in 2008.

In 2009, the newspaper featured in the British soap opera Coronation Street when character Peter Barlow told his grandmother Blanche Hunt that his girlfriend had "an aunt who knew all about the headlines in The Sligo Champion". Writer Simon Crowther wished to mention an Irish newspaper (as Peter's girlfriend was of Irish extraction) and Crowther had recalled a copy he had seen while on holiday in Sligo many years previously.

In September 2010, the paper changed from broadsheet to tabloid format.

In September 2011, The Sligo Champion celebrated its 175th birthday, attended by, among others, the then Communications Minister Pat Rabbitte.

In September 2023, the newspaper got a new logo.
