= List of songs that reached number one on the Irish Singles Chart =

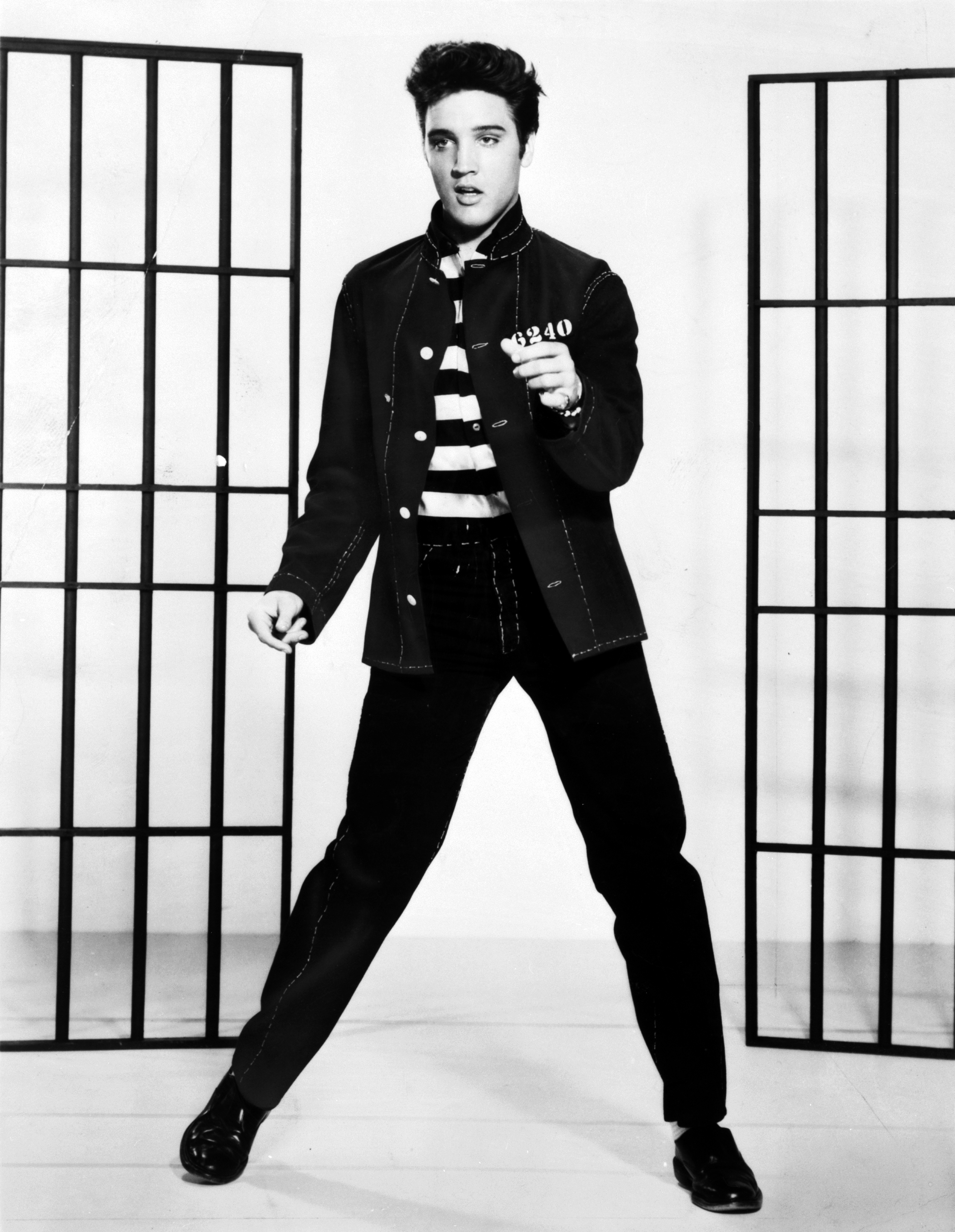
On 5 October 1962, Elvis Presley's "She's Not You" was declared Ireland's first number one.

This is a list of number-one songs as recorded by IRMA’s Top 50 Singles chart — a weekly national survey of popular songs in Ireland. It is compiled by the IRMA from single sales.

The lists below show the songs that have topped the chart. Dates shown represent "week-ending" IRMA issue dates. Prior to 1992, the Irish singles chart was compiled from trade shipments from the labels to record stores, rather than on consumer sales, and were first broadcast on RTÉ on 1 October 1962. Before this, charts had been printed in the Evening Herald newspaper, but are under debate as to whether they are official or not.

In 1992, the singles chart became based on consumer sales after IFPI and the Irish Recorded Music Association granted a contract to Gallup, a market research company. Gallup installed Epson PX-4 devices in sixty record stores to collect singles sales data. In 1996, Chart-Track was formed as a result of a management buy-out from Gallup. Also in 1996, with the development of technology, EPOS systems were installed in multiple music retail stores. The EPOS systems allowed for the collection of more accurate sales information. Currently, Chart-Track collects data daily from major record stores such as HMV and Tower Records, as well as over forty independent retailers. In total, data from over 380 stores are collected each week. The singles chart is compiled over seven days and released every Friday at 3pm by the IRMA, while Midweek Charts are produced daily, but only released to IRMA members.

== List by decade ==
=== 1960s ===
1962 • 1963 • 1964 • 1965 • 1966 • 1967 • 1968 • 1969

=== 1970s ===
1970 • 1971 • 1972 • 1973 • 1974 • 1975 • 1976 • 1977 • 1978 • 1979

=== 1980s ===
1980 • 1981 • 1982 • 1983 • 1984 • 1985 • 1986 • 1987 • 1988 • 1989

=== 1990s ===
1990 • 1991 • 1992 • 1993 • 1994 • 1995 • 1996 • 1997 • 1998 • 1999

=== 2000s ===
2000 • 2001 • 2002 • 2003 • 2004 • 2005 • 2006 • 2007 • 2008 • 2009

=== 2010s ===
2010 • 2011 • 2012 • 2013 • 2014 • 2015 • 2016 • 2017 • 2018 • 2019

=== 2020s ===
2020 • 2021 • 2022 • 2023 • 2024 • 2025 • 2026

== See also ==
- List of artists who reached number one in Ireland
- IRMA
