= List of number-one singles of 1990 (Ireland) =

The following is a list of the IRMA's number-one singles of 1990.

Three consecutive number ones ("Give It A Lash Jack", "The Game" and "Put 'Em Under Pressure") related to the Republic of Ireland team's competing in the 1990 FIFA World Cup.

"Put 'Em Under Pressure", the official song of the 1990 World Cup campaign, was at the No. 1 spot for 13 weeks.

Issue date	Song	Artist	Ref.
4 January	"Do They Know It's Christmas?"	Band Aid II	
11 January	"Do They Know It's Christmas?"	Band Aid II	
18 January	"Hangin' Tough"	New Kids On The Block	
25 January	"Nothing Compares 2 U"	Sinéad O'Connor	
1 February	"Nothing Compares 2 U"	Sinéad O'Connor	
8 February	"Nothing Compares 2 U"	Sinéad O'Connor	
15 February	"Nothing Compares 2 U"	Sinéad O'Connor	
22 February	"Nothing Compares 2 U"	Sinéad O'Connor	
1 March	"Nothing Compares 2 U"	Sinéad O'Connor	
8 March	"Love Shack"	The B-52's	
15 March	"Brits Mix 1990"	Various Artists	
22 March	"That Sounds Good to Me"	Jive Bunny and the Mastermixers	
29 March	"That Sounds Good to Me"	Jive Bunny and the Mastermixers	
5 April	"The By-road to Glenroe"	Mick Lally	
12 April	"The By-road to Glenroe"	Mick Lally	
19 April	"The By-road to Glenroe"	Mick Lally	
26 April	"The By-road to Glenroe"	Mick Lally	
3 May	"The By-road to Glenroe"	Mick Lally	
10 May	"Give It A Lash Jack"	Liam Harrison and the GOAL Celebrities	
17 May	"The Game"	The Memories	
24 May	"Give It a Lash Jack"	Liam Harrison and the GOAL Celebrities	
31 May	"Put 'Em Under Pressure"	The Republic of Ireland Football Squad	
7 June	"Put 'Em Under Pressure"	The Republic of Ireland Football Squad	
14 June	"Put 'Em Under Pressure"	The Republic of Ireland Football Squad	
21 June	"Put 'Em Under Pressure"	The Republic of Ireland Football Squad	
28 June	"Put 'Em Under Pressure"	The Republic of Ireland Football Squad	
5 July	"Put 'Em Under Pressure"	The Republic of Ireland Football Squad	
12 July	"Put 'Em Under Pressure"	The Republic of Ireland Football Squad	
19 July	"Put 'Em Under Pressure"	The Republic of Ireland Football Squad	
26 July	"Put 'Em Under Pressure"	The Republic of Ireland Football Squad	
2 August	"Put 'Em Under Pressure"	The Republic of Ireland Football Squad	
9 August	"Put 'Em Under Pressure"	The Republic of Ireland Football Squad	
16 August	"Put 'Em Under Pressure"	The Republic of Ireland Football Squad	
23 August	"Put 'Em Under Pressure"	The Republic of Ireland Football Squad	
30 August	"Itsy Bitsy Teeny Weeny Yellow Polka Dot Bikini"	Bombalurina	
6 September	"The Joker"	The Steve Miller Band	
13 September	"The Joker"	The Steve Miller Band	
20 September	"I Useta Lover"	The Saw Doctors	
27 September	"I Useta Lover"	The Saw Doctors	
4 October	"I Useta Lover"	The Saw Doctors	
11 October	"I Useta Lover"	The Saw Doctors	
18 October	"I Useta Lover"	The Saw Doctors	
25 October	"I Useta Lover"	The Saw Doctors	
1 November	"I Useta Lover"	The Saw Doctors	
8 November	"Unchained Melody"	The Righteous Brothers	
15 November	"Unchained Melody"	The Righteous Brothers	
22 November	"Ooh Aah Paul McGrath"	Watch Your House	
29 November	"Ooh Aah Paul McGrath"	Watch Your House	
6 December	"Ice Ice Baby"	Vanilla Ice	
13 December	"The Christmas No. 1"	Zig and Zag	
20 December	"The Christmas No. 1"	Zig and Zag	
27 December	"The Christmas No. 1"	Zig and Zag	

- 17 number ones
- Most number ones: All artists one number one
- Most weeks at number one (single): "Put 'Em Under Pressure" - The Republic of Ireland Football Squad (13 weeks)
- Most weeks at number one (artist): The Republic of Ireland Football Squad (13 weeks)

== See also ==
- 1990 in music
- List of artists who reached number one in Ireland
