= List of number-one singles of 1967 (Ireland) =

This is a list of singles which topped the Irish Singles Chart in 1967.

Prior to 1992, the Irish singles chart was compiled from trade shipments from the labels to record stores, rather than on consumer sales. Note that the chart release day changed from Monday to Saturday during March, and to Thursday in May (Note how this meant The Dubliners technically had less than one week at the top of a weekly chart). The release date moved back to Saturday in November.

Issue date	Song	Artist	Ref.
2 January	"Green, Green Grass of Home"	Tom Jones	
9 January	"Green, Green Grass of Home"	Tom Jones	
16 January	"Green, Green Grass of Home"	Tom Jones	
23 January	"I'm a Believer"	The Monkees	
30 January	"I'm a Believer"	The Monkees	
6 February	"I'm a Believer"	The Monkees	
13 February	"I'm a Believer"	The Monkees	
20 February	"The House With the Whitewashed Gable"	Joe Dolan	
27 February	"This Is My Song"	Petula Clark	
4 March	"This Is My Song"	Petula Clark	
11 March	"This Is My Song"	Petula Clark	
18 March	"This Is My Song"	Petula Clark	
25 March	"Release Me"	Engelbert Humperdinck	
1 April	"Release Me"	Engelbert Humperdinck	
8 April	"Release Me"	Engelbert Humperdinck	
15 April	"Somethin' Stupid"	Frank Sinatra & Nancy Sinatra	
22 April	"Puppet on a String"	Sandie Shaw	
29 April	"Puppet on a String"	Sandie Shaw	
6 May	"Puppet on a String"	Sandie Shaw	
13 May	"Seven Drunken Nights"	The Dubliners	
18 May	"The Boston Burglar"	Johnny McEvoy	
25 May	"The Boston Burglar"	Johnny McEvoy	
1 June	"The Boston Burglar"	Johnny McEvoy	
8 June	"Silence is Golden"	The Tremeloes	
15 June	"The Black Velvet Band"	Johnny Kelly & The Capitol Showband	
22 June	"A Whiter Shade of Pale"	Procol Harum	
29 June	"A Whiter Shade of Pale"	Procol Harum	
6 July	"A Whiter Shade of Pale"	Procol Harum	
13 July	"A Whiter Shade of Pale"	Procol Harum	
20 July	"Black Velvet Band"	Johnny Kelly & The Capitol Showband	
27 July	"Black Velvet Band"	Johnny Kelly & The Capitol Showband	
3 August	"All You Need Is Love"	The Beatles	
10 August	"All You Need Is Love"	The Beatles	
17 August	"Black Velvet Band"	Johnny Kelly & The Capitol Showband	
24 August	"Black Velvet Band"	Johnny Kelly & The Capitol Showband	
31 August	"Black Velvet Band"	Johnny Kelly & The Capitol Showband	
7 September	"Black Velvet Band"	Johnny Kelly & The Capitol Showband	
14 September	"San Francisco (Be Sure to Wear Flowers in Your Hair)"	Scott McKenzie	
21 September	"The Last Waltz"	Engelbert Humperdinck	
28 September	"The Last Waltz"	Engelbert Humperdinck	
5 October	"The Last Waltz"	Engelbert Humperdinck	
12 October	"The Last Waltz"	Engelbert Humperdinck	
19 October	"The Last Waltz"	Engelbert Humperdinck	
28 October	"Whiskey on a Sunday"	Danny Doyle	
4 November	"Whiskey on a Sunday"	Danny Doyle	
11 November	"Whiskey on a Sunday"	Danny Doyle	
18 November	"Whiskey on a Sunday"	Danny Doyle	
25 November	"Whiskey on a Sunday"	Danny Doyle	
2 December	"Whiskey on a Sunday"	Danny Doyle	
9 December	"Whiskey on a Sunday"	Danny Doyle	
16 December	"Treat Me Daughter Kindly"	Pat Lynch	
23 December	"Treat Me Daughter Kindly"	Pat Lynch	
30 December	"Treat Me Daughter Kindly"	Pat Lynch	

== See also ==
- 1967 in music
- Irish Singles Chart
- List of artists who reached number one in Ireland
