= List of number-one singles of 1998 (Ireland) =

The following is a list of the IRMA's number-one singles of 1998. The dates shown below are Sundays.

Issue date	Song	Artist	Ref.
4 January	"Perfect Day"	Various Artists	
11 January	"Perfect Day"	Various Artists	
18 January	"All Around the World"	Oasis	
25 January	"All Around the World"	Oasis	
1 February	"Doctor Jones"	Aqua	
8 February	"Doctor Jones"	Aqua	
15 February	"My Heart Will Go On"	Celine Dion	
22 February	"My Heart Will Go On"	Celine Dion	
1 March	"My Heart Will Go On"	Celine Dion	
8 March	"My Heart Will Go On"	Celine Dion	
15 March	"My Heart Will Go On"	Celine Dion	
22 March	"My Heart Will Go On"	Celine Dion	
29 March	"It's Like That"	Run-D.M.C. vs. Jason Nevins	
5 April	"It's Like That"	Run-D.M.C. vs. Jason Nevins	
12 April	"It's Like That"	Run-D.M.C. vs. Jason Nevins	
19 April	"It's Like That"	Run-D.M.C. vs. Jason Nevins	
26 April	"All That I Need"	Boyzone	
3 May	"All That I Need"	Boyzone	
10 May	"All That I Need"	Boyzone	
17 May	"Feel It"	The Tamperer featuring Maya	
24 May	"Feel It"	The Tamperer featuring Maya	
31 May	"Feel It"	The Tamperer featuring Maya	
7 June	"C'est La Vie"	B*Witched	
14 June	"C'est La Vie"	B*Witched	
21 June	"C'est La Vie"	B*Witched	
28 June	"C'est La Vie"	B*Witched	
5 July	"C'est La Vie"	B*Witched	
12 July	"C'est La Vie"	B*Witched	
19 July	"Ghetto Supastar (That Is What You Are)"	Pras Michel feat. Mýa and Ol' Dirty Bastard	
26 July	"Ghetto Supastar (That Is What You Are)"	Pras Michel feat. Mýa and Ol' Dirty Bastard	
2 August	"Ghetto Supastar (That Is What You Are)"	Pras Michel feat. Mýa and Ol' Dirty Bastard	
9 August	"No Matter What"	Boyzone	
16 August	"No Matter What"	Boyzone	
23 August	"No Matter What"	Boyzone	
30 August	"No Matter What"	Boyzone	
6 September	"No Matter What"	Boyzone	
13 September	"No Matter What"	Boyzone	
20 September	"Millennium"	Robbie Williams	
27 September	"Millennium"	Robbie Williams	
4 October	"Millennium"	Robbie Williams	(Note: Irish Independent (2023) lists "Millennium" at the No. 1 spot as of 1 October 1998.)
11 October	"I Don't Want to Miss a Thing"	Aerosmith	
18 October	"I Don't Want to Miss a Thing"	Aerosmith	
25 October	"Sweetest Thing"	U2	
1 November	"Sweetest Thing"	U2	
8 November	"Irreplaceable"	Kerri Ann	
15 November	"Believe"	Cher	
22 November	"Believe"	Cher	
29 November	"Believe"	Cher	
6 December	"Believe"	Cher	
13 December	"Believe"	Cher	
20 December	"Believe"	Cher	
27 December	"Goodbye"	Spice Girls	

== See also ==
- 1998 in music
- List of artists who reached number one in Ireland
