= Cry Before Dawn =

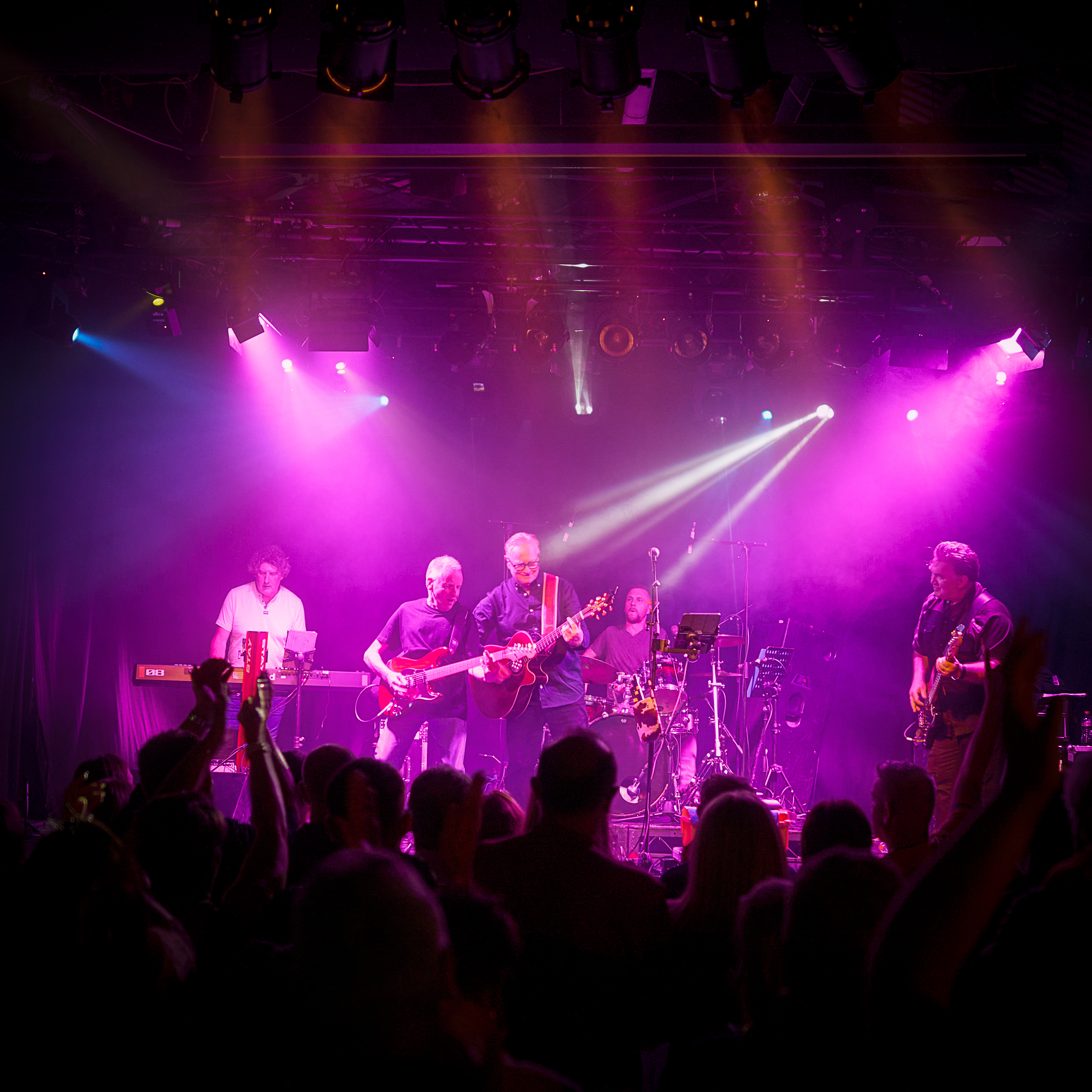

Background information
- Origin: Wexford, Ireland
- Genre: Celtic rock
- Years active: 1984–1992; 2010–present
- Labels: Dawn Records; Epic; Solid

Cry Before Dawn are a four-piece rock band originally hailing from Wexford in Ireland. They released several singles and two albums in the late 1980s and toured Ireland, the UK and US.

== Career ==
They achieved attention in 1987 in the UK when they released their album Crimes of Conscience on the CBS label. The lead single from the album was "Gone Forever", which was released in Ireland in February 1987 and subsequently re-released there and in the UK in 1988. The follow-up singles were "The Seed That's Been Sown" and "Girl in the Ghetto". The album was a success in Ireland and was critically acclaimed in the UK. Their success in Ireland did not transfer to the UK however, although they supported Big Country on their 1989 UK "Peace in Our Time" tour.

In 1988 Cry Before Dawn contributed a new track, "Silly Dreams" to the soundtrack of the Irish film, The Courier. Their second album Witness for the World was recorded in Wales and mixed in Los Angeles, California by Greg Ledanyi, and was released to lukewarm reception in 1989, again on Epic/CBS. The lead single, "Witness for the World", reached number 67 in the UK Singles Chart in June 1989, though the two follow-up singles: "Last of the Sun" and "No Living Without You" failed to chart. Around the time of their second album, the band appeared on the cover of the Irish music magazine Hot Press. In 1989, Cry Before Dawn were awarded best Irish group at the Irish Recorded Music Association (IRMA) awards, after winning the 'Best Newcomer' award 2 years earlier. After parting with their record company, the band toured Ireland later the same year, after which they decided to split.

This initial disbanding was short-lived, however, and the band reformed with Paul Spencer replacing Tony Hall on guitar. Steve Belton subsequently took on the role of guitarist instead of Paul Spencer. After a single-only release, "To Be True" in 1992, the band parted company again

Brendan Wade subsequently teamed up with Paul Bell to form The Wild Swans, shortened to The Swans in 1999, and renamed again to Bell and Wade in 2000. Their songs were moderately successful in Ireland, being released on Ritz Records and their own record label. Their most successful release was "Dancing at the Crossroads", released to coincide with County Wexford's success in the 1996 All-Ireland hurling final, which reached number 1 in the Irish pop chart.

The band reformed in November 2010. Brendan Wade's own website gave the lineup for the reunion tour as Wade, Pat Hayes, Vinnie Doyle and Steve Belton. The first dates announced on the tour were Vicar Street, Dublin on 8 April 2011, and at Wexford Opera House on 14 May 2011.

In December 2012, the band issued a limited edition double album of their two nights at the Wexford Opera House, produced by Steve Belton, called Live at the Opera House. In 2013, a comeback single "Is This What You Waited For" reached No.47 in the Irish singles chart. A six-track EP Open Water was released in 2025. It reached No.2 in the Irish album charts.

== Members ==
- Brendan Wade – vocals, acoustic guitar, uilleann pipes and whistle
- Vince Doyle – bass guitar
- Pat Hayes – drums, percussion, backing vocals
- Tony Hall – electric and acoustic guitars

== Discography ==
=== Albums ===
- Crimes of Conscience (CBS, 1987)
- Witness for the World (CBS, 1989)
- The Best of Cry Before Dawn (Sony Music Ireland, 2011)
- Live at the Wexford Opera House (CBD, 2011)
- Open Water EP (CBD, 2025) #2 IRL, #1 IRL Inde
- Songs That Got Away 1984-1990 (Sony Music Ireland, 2026)

=== Singles ===
Year	Title	Peak chart positions		Album
Year	Title	UK	IRE	Album
1984	"Follow Me"	—	—	Non-album single
1987	"Gone Forever"	80	11	Crimes of Conscience
1987	"The Seed That's Been Sown"	159	17	Crimes of Conscience
1987	"Girl in the Ghetto"	166	24	Crimes of Conscience
1988	"Gone Forever" (UK re-issue)	84	—	Crimes of Conscience
1988	"Flags" (Ireland only)	—	—	Crimes of Conscience
1989	"Witness for the World"	67	13	Witness for the World
1989	"Last of the Sun"	108	17	Witness for the World
1990	"No Living Without You"	107	13	Witness for the World
1992	"To Be True"	—	—	Non-album singles
2013	"Is This What You Waited For"	—	47	Non-album singles
2025	"Open Water"	—	—	Open Water
2025	"Peace and Freedom"	—	—	Open Water
2026	"Where Are All the heroes?"	—	—	Non-album single
