= List of number-one singles of 1977 (Ireland) =

This is a list of singles which have reached number one on the Irish Singles Chart in 1977.

Week ending	Song	Artist	Ref.
1 January	"When a Child Is Born"	Johnny Mathis	
8 January	"If You Leave Me Now"	Chicago	
15 January	"If You Leave Me Now"	Chicago	
22 January	"Living Next Door to Alice"	Smokie	
29 January	"Living Next Door to Alice"	Smokie	
5 February	"Don't Cry for Me Argentina"	Julie Covington	
12 February	"Don't Cry for Me Argentina"	Julie Covington	
19 February	"Don't Cry for Me Argentina"	Julie Covington	
26 February	"When I Need You"	Leo Sayer	
5 March	"When I Need You"	Leo Sayer	
12 March	"When I Need You"	Leo Sayer	
19 March	"Chanson D'Amour"	The Manhattan Transfer	
26 March	"Chanson D'Amour"	The Manhattan Transfer	
2 April	"Chanson D'Amour"	The Manhattan Transfer	
9 April	"Knowing Me, Knowing You"	ABBA	
16 April	"Knowing Me, Knowing You"	ABBA	
23 April	"Knowing Me, Knowing You"	ABBA	
30 April	"Knowing Me, Knowing You"	ABBA	
7 May	"Knowing Me, Knowing You"	ABBA	
14 May	"It's Nice To Be In Love Again"	The Swarbriggs	
21 May	"Have I the Right?"	Dead End Kids	
28 May	"Have I the Right?"	Dead End Kids	
4 June	"Have I the Right?"	Dead End Kids	
11 June	"Big Tom is Still the King"	Susan McCann	
18 June	"Big Tom is Still the King"	Susan McCann	
25 June	"Back Home"	Dickie Rock	
2 July	"Back Home"	Dickie Rock	
9 July	"Back Home"	Dickie Rock	
16 July	"Back Home"	Dickie Rock	
23 July	"Sam"	Olivia Newton-John	
30 July	"Sam"	Olivia Newton-John	
6 August	"Benjy Wrapped his Tractor Round the Old Oak Tree"	Brendan Grace	
13 August	"Benjy Wrapped his Tractor Round the Old Oak Tree"	Brendan Grace	
20 August	"Daddy's Little Girl"	Brendan Quinn	
27 August	"Angelo"	Brotherhood of Man	
3 September	"I Need You"	Joe Dolan	
10 September	Way Down	Elvis Presley	
17 September	"I Need You"	Joe Dolan	
24 September	"Nobody Does It Better"	Carly Simon	
1 October	"Way Down"	Elvis Presley	
8 October	"Silver Lady"	David Soul	
15 October	"Silver Lady"	David Soul	
22 October	"Silver Lady"	David Soul	
29 October	"Silver Lady"	David Soul	
5 November	"Yes Sir, I Can Boogie"	Baccara	
12 November	"Calling Occupants of Interplanetary Craft"	The Carpenters	(Note: As of 9 November 1977 per Irish Independent.)
19 November	"Calling Occupants of Interplanetary Craft"	The Carpenters	
26 November	"Belfast"	Boney M.	
3 December	"Rockin' All Over the World"	Status Quo	
10 December	"Mull of Kintyre"	Wings	
17 December	"Mull of Kintyre"	Wings	
24 December	"Mull of Kintyre"	Wings	
31 December	"Mull of Kintyre"	Wings	

- 24 Number Ones
- Most weeks at No.1 (artist): ABBA (5)
- Most weeks at No.1 (song): "Knowing Me, Knowing You" - ABBA (5)
- Most No.1s: all artists 1 Number One each

== See also ==
- 1977 in music
- Irish Singles Chart
- List of artists who reached number one in Ireland
