= Stadium anthem =

Songs played at sports events

Stadium anthems or sports anthems or arena anthems are terms to refer songs that are played over the public address systems at stadiums and arenas during breaks in the action to rally the fans. Unlike college fight songs, most stadium anthems were not written primarily for use at sports events, though compilations such as ESPN Presents Stadium Anthems and the "Jock" series occasionally feature remixed versions of these songs designed to segue together or to accentuate the rhythm or other elements of the songs. Some football events have their own anthems, which are not played during breaks, but rather as entrance music, the most notable being the FIFA Anthem and the UEFA Champions League Anthem.

Stadium anthems are characterized by a catchy uptempo rhythm and a repeated vocal call-response catchphrase, often a statement of pride (such as "We Will Rock You", "We Are the Champions" and "Another One Bites the Dust" by Queen). Most stadium anthems are drawn from popular rock and roll, dance or rap hits. At college football games, the schools' marching bands often add stadium anthems to their repertoires. In baseball, many stadium anthems are used as entrance music for various ballplayers. For example, AC/DC's "Hells Bells" was the entrance music for Trevor Hoffman and Metallica's "Enter Sandman" filled the same role for Mariano Rivera.

Some stadium anthems are popular in a particular region, or with a specific team because of a reference in the song's lyrics. Gerry and the Pacemakers' version of "You'll Never Walk Alone" is the club anthem of Liverpool F.C. The 1968 Beatles song "Hey Jude" is the club anthem for London club Brentford F.C. "Just idag är jag stark" by Kenta is the club anthem of Hammarby Fotboll, while "When We Were Young" was the anthem of Cork Hibernians. The Dallas Cowboys made heavy use of "Should've Been a Cowboy" by Toby Keith in the 1990s, while sports teams in Alabama often use "Sweet Home Alabama" by Lynyrd Skynyrd. The song "The Dream of Warsaw" (Sen o Warszawie) by the famous Polish rock-musician Czesław Niemen is traditionally used as entrance music at Legia Warsaw's Polish Army Stadium. In a rare example of a team actually being mentioned in a song's lyrics, the University of Alabama marching band often plays "Deacon Blues" by Steely Dan due to the school being referred to as one of "the winners in the world", even though the reference was intended to be sarcastic.

== Popular sports anthems ==
=== Association football ===
- FIFA Anthem
- AFC Anthem
- UEFA Champions League Anthem
- UEFA Europa League Anthem
- Major League Soccer Anthem
- J.League Anthem – "J'S THEME”
- Japan Football Association Anthem – "Japanese Soccer Anthem"

=== Australian Rules football ===
- “Eagle Rock” by Daddy Cool (unofficial theme song of the West Coast Eagles)
- "Never Tear Us Apart" by INXS (unofficial theme song of the Port Adelaide Football Club)

=== Versatile ===
- "Another One Bites The Dust" by Queen
- "Blitzkrieg Bop" by The Ramones
- "Crazy Train" by Ozzy Osbourne
- "Don't Look Back in Anger" by Oasis
- "Don't Stop Believin'" by Journey
- "Eye of the Tiger" by Survivor
- "Freed from Desire" by Gala
- "Get Ready for This" by 2 Unlimited
- "Gonna Fly Now" by Bill Conti
- "Heroes" by David Bowie
- "Maria (I Like It Loud)" by Scooter
- "Kernkraft 400" by Zombie Nation
- "Mr. Brightside" by the Killers
- "Mr. Touchdown, U.S.A." by Ruth Roberts
- "Halftime (Stand Up and Get Crunk)" by Ying Yang Twins
- "Na Na Hey Hey Kiss Him Goodbye" by Steam
- "Remember the Name" by Fort Minor
- "Rock and Roll Part 2" by Gary Glitter
- "Seven Nation Army" by The White Stripes
- "Sirius" by The Alan Parsons Project
- "Song 2" by Blur
- "The Final Countdown" by Europe
- "Swag Surfin" by Fast Life Yungstaz
- "Sweet Caroline" by Neil Diamond
- "Thunderstruck" by AC/DC
- "We Are the Champions" by Queen
- "We Will Rock You" by Queen
- "Welcome to the Jungle" by Guns 'N' Roses

== See also ==
- Entrance music
- Fight song
- Football chant
- Theme music
- Music at sporting events
- Jock series
