= List of number-one singles of 2001 (Ireland) =

The following is a list of the IRMA's number-one singles of 2001.

Issue date	Song	Artist	refs
5 January	"Stan"	Eminem	
13 January	"Stan"	Eminem	
20 January	"Touch Me"	Rui da Silva featuring Cassandra	
27 January	"Touch Me"	Rui da Silva featuring Cassandra	
3 February	"Stuck in a Moment You Can't Get Out Of"	U2	
10 February	"Rollin' (Air Raid Vehicle)"	Limp Bizkit	
17 February	"Whole Again"	Atomic Kitten	
24 February	"Always Come Back to Your Love"	Samantha Mumba	
3 March	"It Wasn't Me"	Shaggy featuring Rikrok	
10 March	"Uptown Girl"	Westlife	
17 March	"Uptown Girl"	Westlife	
24 March	"Uptown Girl"	Westlife	
31 March	"Uptown Girl"	Westlife	
7 April	"Uptown Girl"	Westlife	
14 April	"Uptown Girl"	Westlife	
21 April	"Survivor"	Destiny's Child	
28 April	"Don't Stop Movin'"	S Club 7	
5 May	"It's Raining Men"	Geri Halliwell	
12 May	"It's Raining Men"	Geri Halliwell	
19 May	"It's Raining Men"	Geri Halliwell	
26 May	"It's Raining Men"	Geri Halliwell	
2 June	"Angel"	Shaggy featuring Rayvon	
9 June	"Angel"	Shaggy featuring Rayvon	
16 June	"Angel"	Shaggy featuring Rayvon	
23 June	"Angel"	Shaggy featuring Rayvon	
30 June	"Lady Marmalade"	Christina Aguilera, Lil' Kim, Mýa and Pink	
7 July	"Lady Marmalade"	Christina Aguilera, Lil' Kim, Mýa and Pink	
14 July	"Lady Marmalade"	Christina Aguilera, Lil' Kim, Mýa and Pink	
21 July	"Elevation"	U2	
28 July	"Hey Baby (Uhh, Ahh)"	DJ Ötzi	
4 August	"Hey Baby (Uhh, Ahh)"	DJ Ötzi	
11 August	"Hey Baby (Uhh, Ahh)"	DJ Ötzi	
18 August	"Hey Baby (Uhh, Ahh)"	DJ Ötzi	
25 August	"Hey Baby (Uhh, Ahh)"	DJ Ötzi	
1 September	"Hey Baby (Uhh, Ahh)"	DJ Ötzi	
8 September	"Let Me Blow Ya Mind"	Eve featuring Gwen Stefani	
15 September	"Follow Me"	Uncle Kracker	
22 September	"Can't Get You Out of My Head"	Kylie Minogue	
29 September	"Can't Get You Out of My Head"	Kylie Minogue	
6 October	"Can't Get You Out of My Head"	Kylie Minogue	
13 October	"Can't Get You Out of My Head"	Kylie Minogue	
20 October	"Because I Got High"	Afroman	
27 October	"Because I Got High"	Afroman	
3 November	"Because I Got High"	Afroman	
10 November	"Queen of My Heart"	Westlife	
17 November	"Queen of My Heart"	Westlife	
24 November	"Sweet Caroline"	Dustin	
1 December	"Sweet Caroline"	Dustin	
8 December	"What If"	Kate Winslet	
15 December	"What If"	Kate Winslet	
22 December	"What If"	Kate Winslet	
29 December	"What If"	Kate Winslet	

== See also ==
- 2001 in music
- List of artists who reached number one in Ireland
