= List of number-one singles of 1992 (Ireland) =

The following is a list of the IRMA's number-one singles of 1992.

Issue date	Song	Artist	Ref.
2 January	"Bohemian Rhapsody"/"These Are the Days of Our Lives"	Queen	
9 January	"Bohemian Rhapsody"/"These Are the Days of Our Lives"	Queen	
16 January	"Bohemian Rhapsody"/"These Are the Days of Our Lives"	Queen	
23 January	"Twilight Zone"	2 Unlimited	
30 January	"Goodnight Girl"	Wet Wet Wet	
6 February	"Goodnight Girl"	Wet Wet Wet	
13 February	"Goodnight Girl"	Wet Wet Wet	
20 February	"Goodnight Girl"	Wet Wet Wet	
27 February	"Stay"	Shakespears Sister	
5 March	"One"	U2	
12 March	"Stay"	Shakespears Sister	
19 March	"Tears in Heaven"	Eric Clapton	
26 March	"Stay"	Shakespears Sister	
2 April	"Tears In Heaven"	Eric Clapton	
9 April	"Stay"	Shakespears Sister	
16 April	"Stay"	Shakespears Sister	
23 April	"Stay"	Shakespears Sister	
30 April	"Deeply Dippy"	Right Said Fred	
7 May	"Deeply Dippy"	Right Said Fred	
14 May	"Deeply Dippy"	Right Said Fred	
21 May	"Deeply Dippy"	Right Said Fred	
28 May	"Why Me"	Linda Martin	
4 June	"Knockin' on Heaven's Door"	Guns N' Roses	
11 June	"Jump"	Kris Kross	
18 June	Abba-esque (EP)	Erasure	
25 June	Abba-esque (EP)	Erasure	
2 July	Abba-esque (EP)	Erasure	
9 July	Abba-esque (EP)	Erasure	
16 July	Abba-esque (EP)	Erasure	
23 July	"Ain't No Doubt"	Jimmy Nail	
30 July	"Ain't No Doubt"	Jimmy Nail	
6 August	"Ain't No Doubt"	Jimmy Nail	
13 August	"Rhythm Is a Dancer"	Snap!	
20 August	"Rhythm Is a Dancer"	Snap!	
27 August	"Rhythm Is a Dancer"	Snap!	
3 September	"Rhythm Is a Dancer"	Snap!	
10 September	"Rhythm Is a Dancer"	Snap!	
17 September	"Rhythm Is a Dancer"	Snap!	
24 September	"Rhythm Is a Dancer"	Snap!	
1 October	"Rhythm Is a Dancer"	Snap!	
8 October	"Ebeneezer Goode"	The Shamen	
15 October	"Sleeping Satellite"	Tasmin Archer	
22 October	"Sleeping Satellite"	Tasmin Archer	
29 October	"Sleeping Satellite"	Tasmin Archer	
5 November	"Sleeping Satellite"	Tasmin Archer	
12 November	"End Of The Road"	Boyz II Men	
19 November	"End Of The Road"	Boyz II Men	
26 November	"End Of The Road"	Boyz II Men	
3 December	"I Will Always Love You"	Whitney Houston	
10 December	"I Will Always Love You"	Whitney Houston	
17 December	"I Will Always Love You"	Whitney Houston	
24 December	"I Will Always Love You"	Whitney Houston	
31 December	"I Will Always Love You"	Whitney Houston	

- 17 number ones
- Most number ones: All artists one number one each
- Most weeks at number one (single): "Rhythm is a Dancer" - Snap! (8 weeks)
- Most weeks at number one (artist): Snap! (8 weeks)

== See also ==
- 1992 in music
- List of artists who reached number one in Ireland
