= List of number-one singles of 1962 (Ireland) =

This is a list of singles which topped the Irish Singles Chart in 1962.

Until 1992 the Irish singles chart was compiled from trade shipments from the labels to record stores, rather than from consumer sales.

Issue date	Song	Artist	Ref.
5 October	"She's Not You"	Elvis Presley	
12 October	"She's Not You"	Elvis Presley	
19 October	"She's Not You"	Elvis Presley	
26 October	"She's Not You"	Elvis Presley	
2 November	"Telstar"	The Tornados	
9 November	"Telstar"	The Tornados	
16 November	"Lovesick Blues"	Frank Ifield	
23 November	"Lovesick Blues"	Frank Ifield	
30 November	"Lovesick Blues"	Frank Ifield	
7 December	"Lovesick Blues"	Frank Ifield	
14 December	"Return To Sender"	Elvis Presley	
21 December	"Return To Sender"	Elvis Presley	
28 December	"The Next Time / Bachelor Boy"	Cliff Richard	

== See also ==
- 1962 in music
- Irish Singles Chart
- List of artists who reached number one in Ireland
