= The By-road to Glenroe =

Single by Mick Lally
- B-side: "Theme from Glenroe (performed by Jim Lockhart)"
- Released: 1990

"The By-road to Glenroe" was a song from the Irish television series Glenroe, performed by actor Mick Lally in character as Miley Byrne in honour of his wife Biddy. The song was released as a single in 1990, with the show's theme song performed by Jim Lockhart as the B-side, and was Number 1 on the Irish charts for five weeks.
