= List of number-one singles of 2002 (Ireland) =

The following is a list of the IRMA's number-one singles of 2002.

| Issue date | Song | Artist | ref |
|---|---|---|---|
| 5 January | "What If" | Kate Winslet | |
| 12 January | "What If" | Kate Winslet | |
| 19 January | "What If" | Kate Winslet | |
| 26 January | "Get the Party Started" | Pink | |
| 2 February | "Hero" | Enrique Iglesias | |
| 9 February | "Hero" | Enrique Iglesias | |
| 16 February | "There's a Whole Lotta Lovin'" | Six | |
| 23 February | "There's a Whole Lotta Lovin'" | Six | |
| 2 March | "There's a Whole Lotta Lovin'" | Six | |
| 9 March | "There's a Whole Lotta Lovin'" | Six | |
| 16 March | "Whenever, Wherever" | Shakira | |
| 23 March | "Unchained Melody" | Gareth Gates | |
| 30 March | "Unchained Melody" | Gareth Gates | |
| 6 April | "Unchained Melody" | Gareth Gates | |
| 13 April | "How You Remind Me" | Nickelback | |
| 20 April | "How You Remind Me" | Nickelback | |
| 27 April | "How You Remind Me" | Nickelback | |
| 4 May | "How You Remind Me" | Nickelback | |
| 11 May | "How You Remind Me" | Nickelback | |
| 18 May | "Here Come the Good Times" | Ireland World Cup Squad featuring various | |
| 25 May | "Without Me" | Eminem | |
| 1 June | "Without Me" | Eminem | |
| 8 June | "Without Me" | Eminem | |
| 15 June | "A Little Less Conversation" | Elvis Presley vs. JXL | |
| 22 June | "A Little Less Conversation" | Elvis Presley vs. JXL | |
| 29 June | "A Little Less Conversation" | Elvis Presley vs. JXL | |
| 6 July | "Let Me Be the One" | Six | |
| 13 July | "Let Me Be the One" | Six | |
| 20 July | "Ramp! (The Logical Song)" | Scooter | |
| 27 July | "Underneath Your Clothes" | Shakira | |
| 3 August | "Underneath Your Clothes" | Shakira | |
| 10 August | "Underneath Your Clothes" | Shakira | |
| 17 August | "Underneath Your Clothes" | Shakira | |
| 24 August | "Like a Prayer" | Mad'House | |
| 31 August | "The Tide Is High (Get The Feeling)" | Atomic Kitten | |
| 7 September | "The Tide Is High (Get The Feeling)" | Atomic Kitten | |
| 14 September | "The Tide Is High (Get The Feeling)" | Atomic Kitten | |
| 21 September | "The Tide Is High (Get The Feeling)" | Atomic Kitten | |
| 28 September | "Complicated" | Avril Lavigne | |
| 5 October | "Complicated" | Avril Lavigne | |
| 12 October | "The Ketchup Song (Aserejé)" | Las Ketchup | |
| 19 October | "Dilemma" | Nelly featuring Kelly Rowland | |
| 25 October | "Dilemma" | Nelly featuring Kelly Rowland | |
| 2 November | "Dilemma" | Nelly featuring Kelly Rowland | |
| 9 November | "Unbreakable" | Westlife | |
| 16 November | "The Ketchup Song (Aserejé)" | Las Ketchup | |
| 23 November | "The Ketchup Song (Aserejé)" | Las Ketchup | |
| 30 November | "Dirrty" | Christina Aguilera featuring Redman | |
| 7 December | "Lose Yourself" | Eminem | |
| 14 December | "Lose Yourself" | Eminem | |
| 21 December | "Lose Yourself" | Eminem | |
| 28 December | "Lose Yourself" | Eminem | |

- 21 Number Ones
- Most weeks at No.1 (song): "How You Remind Me" – Nickelback (5)
- Most weeks at No.1 (artist): Eminem (7)
- Most No.1s: Eminem, Shakira and Six (2)

== See also ==
- 2002 in music
- List of artists who reached number one in Ireland
