= List of number-one singles of 1980 (Ireland) =

This is a list of singles which have reached number one on the Irish Singles Chart in 1980.

Week ending	Song	Artist
5 January	"Another Brick in the Wall (Part 2)"	Pink Floyd
12 January	"Another Brick in the Wall (Part 2)"	Pink Floyd
19 January	"Totus Tuus"	Dana
26 January	"Brass in Pocket"	The Pretenders
2 February	"Brass in Pocket"	The Pretenders
No charts exist for 34 weeks due to a strike.
4 October	"Don't Stand So Close to Me"	The Police
11 October	"Don't Stand So Close to Me"	The Police
18 October	"Don't Stand So Close to Me"	The Police
25 October	"Don't Stand So Close to Me"	The Police
1 November	"Woman in Love"	Barbra Streisand
8 November	"Woman in Love"	Barbra Streisand
15 November	"Woman in Love"	Barbra Streisand
22 November	"Woman in Love"	Barbra Streisand
29 November	"Super Trouper"	ABBA
6 December	"Super Trouper"	ABBA
13 December	"Super Trouper"	ABBA
20 December	"There's No-one Quite Like Grandma"	St Winifred's School Choir
27 December	"There's No-one Quite Like Grandma"	St Winifred's School Choir

Hot Press magazine published fortnightly charts during the strike period. This information is now used by https://www.irma.ie/irish-charts/. The number ones from this period (one every two weeks) were as follows...

Fortnight ending	Song	Artist
12 February	"Brass in Pocket"	The Pretenders
26 February	"Coward of the County"	Kenny Rogers
13 March	"Coward of the County"	Kenny Rogers
27 March	"Take That Look Off Your Face"	Marti Webb
10 April	"Take That Look Off Your Face"	Marti Webb
24 April	"Take That Look Off Your Face"	Marti Webb
8 May	"Working My Way Back to You"	Detroit Spinners
22 May	"What's Another Year"	Johnny Logan
5 June	"What's Another Year"	Johnny Logan
19 June	"What's Another Year"	Johnny Logan
2 July	"Theme from MASH"	The MASH
16 July	"Crying"	Don McLean
30 July	"Xanadu"	Olivia Newton-John and Electric Light Orchestra
13 August	"Xanadu"	Olivia Newton-John and Electric Light Orchestra
27 August	"Xanadu"	Olivia Newton-John and Electric Light Orchestra
10 September	"The Winner Takes It All"	ABBA
25 September	"Start!"	The Jam
2 October	"Feels Like I'm in Love"	Kelly Marie

== Notes ==
- NOTE: Although the official Irish charts recommenced on 5 October (week ending 4 October), the Irish charts website still lists the Hot Press chart for 26 September – 9 October fortnight. This give the No.1 to be "Feels Like I'm in Love" by Kelly Marie, taking away the first two weeks of The Police's "Don't Stand So Close to Me". In reality, viewed from the variation on publication dates, this effectively gives Kelly Marie a two-day No.1 (26-27 September).

== Stats ==
- 16 Number Ones
- Most weeks at No.1 (song): "Take That Look Off Your Face" – Marti Webb, "What's Another Year" – Johnny Logan, "Xanadu" – Olivia Newton-John and Electric Light Orchestra (6 weeks)
- Most weeks at No.1 (artist): Marti Webb, Johnny Logan, Olivia Newton-John and Electric Light Orchestra (6)
- Most No.1s: Abba (2)

== See also ==
- 1980 in music
- Irish Singles Chart
- List of artists who reached number one in Ireland
