= List of number-one singles of 1988 (Ireland) =

This is a list of singles which have reached number one on the Irish Singles Chart in 1988.

Week ending	Song	Artist	Ref.
2 January	"Fairytale of New York"	The Pogues featuring Kirsty MacColl	
9 January	"Fairytale of New York"	The Pogues featuring Kirsty MacColl	
16 January	"Heaven is a Place on Earth"	Belinda Carlisle	
23 January	"Sign Your Name"	Terence Trent D'Arby	
30 January	"I Think We're Alone Now"	Tiffany	
6 February	"I Think We're Alone Now"	Tiffany	
13 February	"When Will I Be Famous"	Bros	
20 February	"Get Outta My Dreams, Get into My Car"	Billy Ocean	
27 February	"I Should Be So Lucky"	Kylie Minogue	
5 March	"I Should Be So Lucky"	Kylie Minogue	
12 March	"Together Forever"	Rick Astley	
19 March	"Feet on the Ground"	Hothouse Flowers	
26 March	"Drop the Boy"	Bros	
2 April	"Could've Been"	Tiffany	
9 April	"Heart"	Pet Shop Boys	
16 April	"Heart"	Pet Shop Boys	
23 April	"Heart"	Pet Shop Boys	
30 April	"One More Try"	George Michael	
7 May	"Perfect"	Fairground Attraction	
14 May	"Perfect"	Fairground Attraction	
21 May	"With a Little Help from My Friends"	Wet Wet Wet	
28 May	"With a Little Help from My Friends"	Wet Wet Wet	
4 June	"With a Little Help from My Friends"	Wet Wet Wet	
11 June	"The Boys in Green"	Republic of Ireland Soccer Squad	
18 June	"The Boys in Green"	Republic of Ireland Soccer Squad	
25 June	"The Boys in Green"	Republic of Ireland Soccer Squad	
2 July	"The Boys in Green"	Republic of Ireland Soccer Squad	
9 July	"Fast Car"	Tracy Chapman	
16 July	"Nothing's Gonna Change My Love for You"	Glenn Medeiros	
23 July	"Nothing's Gonna Change My Love for You"	Glenn Medeiros	
30 July	"Nothing's Gonna Change My Love for You"	Glenn Medeiros	(Note: The Irish Independent (2023) lists "Nothing's Gonna Change My Love For You" as the No. 1 single as of 28 July 1988.)
6 August	"Flight of Earls"	Paddy Reilly	
13 August	"The Locomotion"	Kylie Minogue	
20 August	"The Only Way Is Up"	Yazz and the Plastic Population	
27 August	"The Only Way Is Up"	Yazz and the Plastic Population	
3 September	"The Harder I Try"	Brother Beyond	
10 September	"A Groovy Kind of Love"	Phil Collins	
17 September	"A Groovy Kind of Love"	Phil Collins	
24 September	"Desire"	U2	
1 October	"Desire"	U2	
8 October	"Desire"	U2	
15 October	"Desire"	U2	
22 October	"Orinoco Flow (Sail Away)"	Enya	
29 October	"Orinoco Flow (Sail Away)"	Enya	
5 November	"Orinoco Flow (Sail Away)"	Enya	
12 November	"Orinoco Flow (Sail Away)"	Enya	
19 November	"Stand Up for Your Love Rights"	Yazz	
26 November	"First Time"	Robin Beck	
3 December	"Missing You"	Chris de Burgh	
10 December	"Mistletoe and Wine"	Cliff Richard	
17 December	"Mistletoe and Wine"	Cliff Richard	
24 December	"Mistletoe and Wine"	Cliff Richard	
31 December	"Mistletoe and Wine"	Cliff Richard	

- 29 Number Ones
- Most weeks at No.1 (song): "The Boys in Green" - Republic of Ireland Soccer Squad, "Desire" - U2, "Orinoco Flow (Sail Away)" - Enya, "Mistletoe and Wine" - Cliff Richard (4)
- Most weeks at No.1 (artist): Republic of Ireland Soccer Squad, U2, Enya, Cliff Richard (4)
- Most No.1s: Tiffany, Bros, Kylie Minogue, Yazz (2)

== See also ==
- 1988 in music
- Irish Singles Chart
- List of artists who reached number one in Ireland
