= Archbishop McHale College =

Coordinates: 53.5105°N 8.8454°W

- Coláiste Ardeaspaig Mhic Éil
- Tuam, County Galway

Information
- Type: Secondary school
- Motto: Misneach agus Meanna "Proud but never complacent"
- Established: 1937
- Principal: John David Kearney
- Faculty: 40
- Enrollment: approx 500

Archbishop McHale College is a non-denominational vocational secondary school situated in Tuam, County Galway, Ireland. It is run by the Galway/Roscommon Education and Training Board. The school is named after Archbishop John McHale.

== Programmes ==
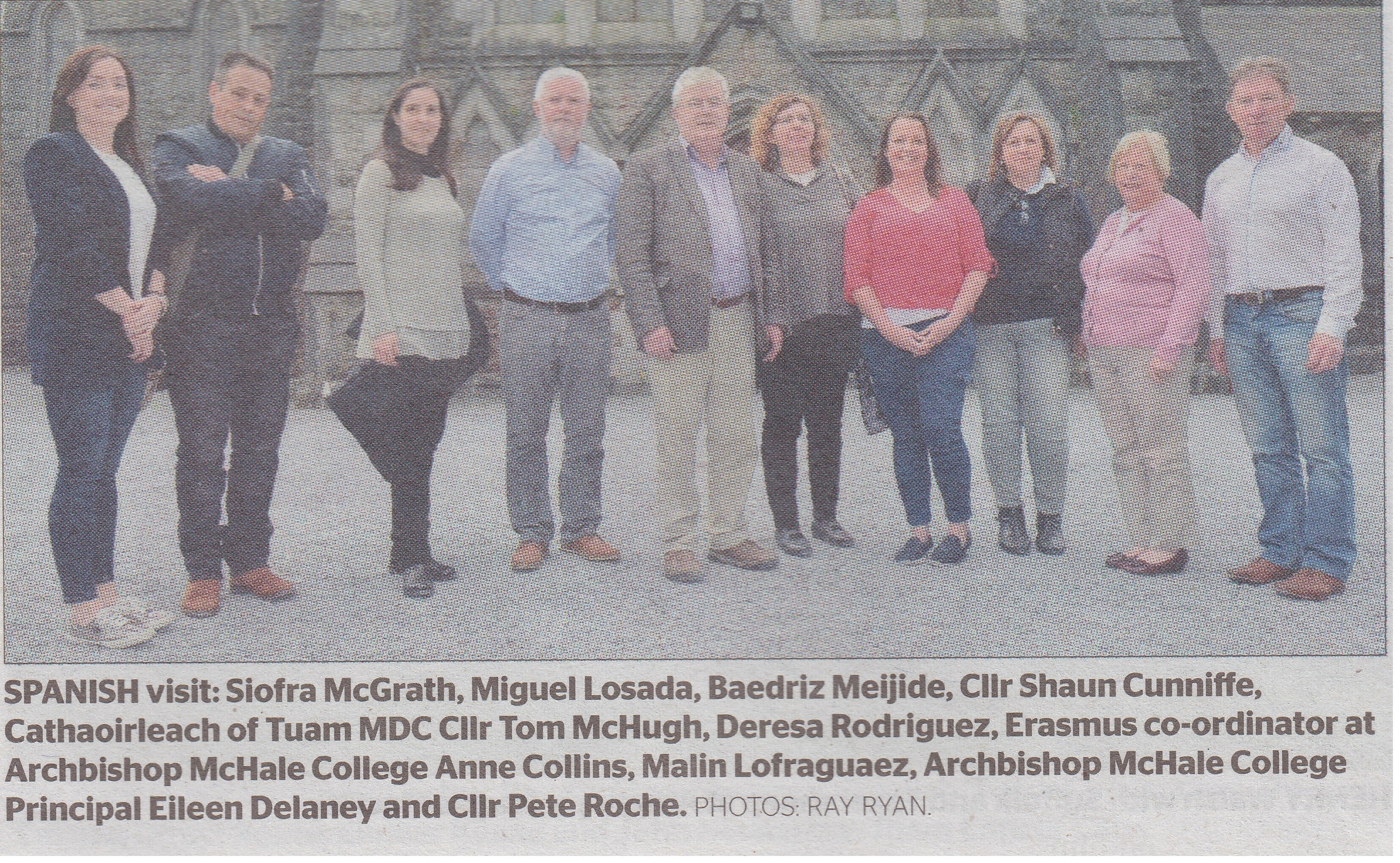
Archbishop McHale College Erasmus+ programme

Archbishop McHale College is participating in the Erasmus+ programme from 2016 to 2019. The school has exchanges with three schools in Ponteareas in Galicia, Spain. Students and staff from Ponteareas visited Tuam in May 2017.

== Former teachers ==
- Mick Lally (1945-2010) - stage, film, and television actor

== Alumni ==
- Tom Murphy (1935-2018) - playwright
