= Crimes of Conscience =

Studio album by Cry Before Dawn
- Released: 1987
- Recorded: 1986–1987
- Genre: Rock
- Length: 34:03
- Label: Epic (CBS)
- Producer: Paul Staveley O'Duffy

Cry Before Dawn chronology
Crimes of Conscience (1987)	Witness for the World (1989)

Crimes of Conscience is the debut studio album by Irish rock band Cry Before Dawn, released in 1987 on Epic/CBS. The album spawned three Irish hit singles—"Gone Forever", "The Seed That's Been Sown" and "Girl in the Ghetto"—and brought the band to wider attention in the UK with a Top 100 entry for "Gone Forever".

== Track listing ==
- All songs written by Cry Before Dawn

Side One

1. "The Seed That's Been Sown" - 3:47
2. "Girl in the Ghetto" - 4:15
3. "Tender Years" - 3:42
4. "Flags" - 3:44
5. "Second Sight" - 3:16

Side Two

1. "Gone Forever" - 3:55
2. "White Strand" - 3:48
3. "Nobody Knows" - 3:31
4. "Stateside Europe" - 4:05
- Sources: Apple Music / label listings; Discogs master entry.

== Singles ==
Year	Single	IRE	UK
1987	"Gone Forever"	11	80
1987	"The Seed That's Been Sown"	17	—
1987	"Girl in the Ghetto"	24	—
1988	"Flags"	—	—
1988	"Gone Forever" (UK re-issue)	—	84

== Personnel ==
- Brendan Wade – vocals, acoustic guitar, uilleann pipes, whistle
- Tony Hall – guitars
- Vinnie Doyle – bass
- Pat Hayes – drums, percussion, backing vocals
- Paul Staveley O’Duffy – producer
