= List of number-one singles of 1963 (Ireland) =

This is a list of singles which topped the Irish Singles Chart in 1963.

Note that prior to 1992, the Irish singles chart was compiled from trade shipments from the labels to record stores, rather than on consumer sales.

Issue date	Song	Artist	Ref.
4 January	"Return To Sender"	Elvis Presley	
11 January	"The Next Time" / "Bachelor Boy"	Cliff Richard	
18 January	"The Next Time" / "Bachelor Boy"	Cliff Richard	
25 January	"The Next Time" / "Bachelor Boy"	Cliff Richard	
1 February	"The Next Time" / "Bachelor Boy"	Cliff Richard	
8 February	"Dance On!"	The Shadows	
15 February	"Dance On!"	The Shadows	
22 February	"Diamonds"	Jet Harris and Tony Meehan	
1 March	"Little Town Flirt"	Del Shannon	
8 March	"From a Jack to a King"	Ned Miller	
15 March	"From a Jack to a King"	Ned Miller	
22 March	"From a Jack to a King"	Ned Miller	
29 March	"From a Jack to a King"	Ned Miller	
5 April	"From a Jack to a King"	Ned Miller	
12 April	"From a Jack to a King"	Ned Miller	
19 April	"From a Jack to a King"	Ned Miller	
26 April	"From a Jack to a King"	Ned Miller	
3 May	"From a Jack to a King"	Ned Miller	
10 May	"Rhythm of the Rain"	The Cascades	
17 May	"From Me to You"	The Beatles	
24 May	"In Dreams"	Roy Orbison	
31 May	"In Dreams"	Roy Orbison	
7 June	"Lucky Lips"	Cliff Richard	
14 June	"Welcome to My World"	Jim Reeves	
21 June	"Welcome to My World"	Jim Reeves	
28 June	"Welcome to My World"	Jim Reeves	
5 July	"I Like It"	Gerry & the Pacemakers	
12 July	"I Like It"	Gerry & the Pacemakers	
19 July	"I Like It"	Gerry & the Pacemakers	
26 July	"I Like It"	Gerry & the Pacemakers	
2 August	"I'm Confessin'"	Frank Ifield	
9 August	"Devil in Disguise"	Elvis Presley	
16 August	"Devil in Disguise"	Elvis Presley	
23 August	"Devil in Disguise"	Elvis Presley	
30 August	"Sweets for My Sweet"	The Searchers	
6 September	"Kiss Me Quick"	Brendan Bowyer	
13 September	"Kiss Me Quick"	Brendan Bowyer	
20 September	"Kiss Me Quick"	Brendan Bowyer	
27 September	"Kiss Me Quick"	Brendan Bowyer	
4 October	"Kiss Me Quick"	Brendan Bowyer	
11 October	"Kiss Me Quick"	Brendan Bowyer	
18 October	"Kiss Me Quick"	Brendan Bowyer	
25 October	"Do You Love Me"	Brian Poole and The Tremeloes	
1 November	"Blue Bayou"	Roy Orbison	
8 November	"You'll Never Walk Alone"	Gerry & the Pacemakers	
15 November	"You'll Never Walk Alone"	Gerry & the Pacemakers	
22 November	"You'll Never Walk Alone"	Gerry & the Pacemakers	
29 November	"You'll Never Walk Alone"	Gerry & the Pacemakers	
6 December	"You'll Never Walk Alone"	Gerry & the Pacemakers	
13 December	"You'll Never Walk Alone"	Gerry & the Pacemakers	
20 December	"Don't Talk to Him"	Cliff Richard	
27 December	"No More"	Brendan Bowyer	

== See also ==
- 1963 in music
- Irish Singles Chart
- List of artists who reached number one in Ireland
