= When We Were Young (Pat Lynch song) =

Single by Pat Lynch
- B-side: "Hush A Bye Boy"
- Released: March 1971
- Recorded: March 1971
- Studio: Eamonn Andrews Studios
- Genre: pop, Irish folk, showband
- Length: 2:39
- Label: Ruby (Ireland)
- Songwriters: Barry Mason and Les Reed
- Producer: Jack Bayle

Pat Lynch singles chronology
"Three Good Reasons" (1971)	"When We Were Young" (1971)

"When We Were Young" was a number one hit single by the Irish showband The Airchords, featuring Pat Lynch on lead vocals. Written by Barry Mason and Les Reed, it reached No. 1 on the Irish Singles Chart on 10 April 1971. The song remained at the top of the charts for just the one week, but was to return to the No. 1 position on 8 May of that same year, this time for a period of four weeks. Lynch and the Airchords had already broken up before the song was released. The song became a stadium anthem for Cork Hibernians F.C.
