= List of number-one singles of 1996 (Ireland) =

The following is a list of the IRMA's number-one singles of 1996.

Dates given are the Saturday of publication.

Issue date	Song	Artist	Ref.
5 January	"Father and Son"	Boyzone	
12 January	"Jesus to a Child"	George Michael	
19 January	"Spaceman"	Babylon Zoo	
26 January	"Spaceman"	Babylon Zoo	
2 February	"Spaceman"	Babylon Zoo	
9 February	"Spaceman"	Babylon Zoo	
16 February	"Spaceman"	Babylon Zoo	
23 February	"Don't Look Back in Anger"	Oasis	
1 March	"How Deep Is Your Love"	Take That	
8 March	"How Deep Is Your Love"	Take That	
15 March	"How Deep Is Your Love"	Take That	
22 March	"Aon Focal Eile"	Richie Kavanagh	
29 March	"Aon Focal Eile"	Richie Kavanagh	
5 April	"Aon Focal Eile"	Richie Kavanagh	
12 April	"Aon Focal Eile"	Richie Kavanagh	
19 April	"Aon Focal Eile"	Richie Kavanagh	
26 April	"Aon Focal Eile"	Richie Kavanagh	
3 May	"Aon Focal Eile"	Richie Kavanagh	
10 May	"Man Utd Man"	Men Utd	
17 May	"Man Utd Man"	Men Utd	
24 May	"Man Utd Man"	Men Utd	
31 May	"Man Utd Man"	Men Utd	
7 June	"Nobody Knows"	The Tony Rich Project	
14 June	"Killing Me Softly"	The Fugees	
21 June	"Killing Me Softly"	The Fugees	
28 June	"Killing Me Softly"	The Fugees	
5 July	"Killing Me Softly"	The Fugees	
12 July	"Killing Me Softly"	The Fugees	
19 July	"Killing Me Softly"	The Fugees	
26 July	"Killing Me Softly"	The Fugees	
2 August	"Lemon Tree"	Fool's Garden	
9 August	"Wannabe"	Spice Girls	
16 August	"Wannabe"	Spice Girls	
23 August	"Wannabe"	Spice Girls	
30 August	"Wannabe"	Spice Girls	
6 September	The Hurling Songs (EP)	The Wild Swans	
13 September	The Hurling Songs (EP)	The Wild Swans	
20 September	"How Bizarre"	OMC	
27 September	"How Bizarre"	OMC	
4 October	"How Bizarre"	OMC	
11 October	"Words"	Boyzone	
18 October	"Words"	Boyzone	
25 October	"Words"	Boyzone	
1 November	"Words"	Boyzone	
8 November	"Words"	Boyzone	
15 November	"Rat Trap"	Dustin & Bob Geldof	
22 November	"Rat Trap"	Dustin & Bob Geldof	
29 November	"Rat Trap"	Dustin & Bob Geldof	
6 December	"Breathe"	The Prodigy	
13 December	"Breathe"	The Prodigy	
20 December	"2 Become 1"	Spice Girls	
27 December	"2 Become 1"	Spice Girls	

== See also ==
- 1996 in music
- List of artists who reached number one in Ireland
