= Treat Me Daughter Kindly =

Single by Pat Lynch and the Airchords
- B-side: "Cathedral in the Pines"
- Released: 1967
- Studio: Eamonn Andrews Studios
- Genre: country, Irish folk, showband
- Length: 2:54
- Label: Pye
- Songwriter: Cyril Curran
- Producer: Noel Kelehan

Pat Lynch and the Airchords singles chronology
"The Irish Soldier" (1967)	"Treat Me Daughter Kindly" (1967)	"Kinsale" (1968)

"Treat Me Daughter Kindly" is a 1967 country song written by Cyril Curran and performed by Irish showband singer Pat Lynch and his band, the Airchords.

== Song history ==
"Treat Me Daughter Kindly" was released by in late 1967 and was number one on the Irish Singles Chart for four weeks.

It was later covered by the Wolfe Tones, appearing on their 1968 album The Rights of Man.
