= Susan McCann =

Irish country and folk singer (born 1949)

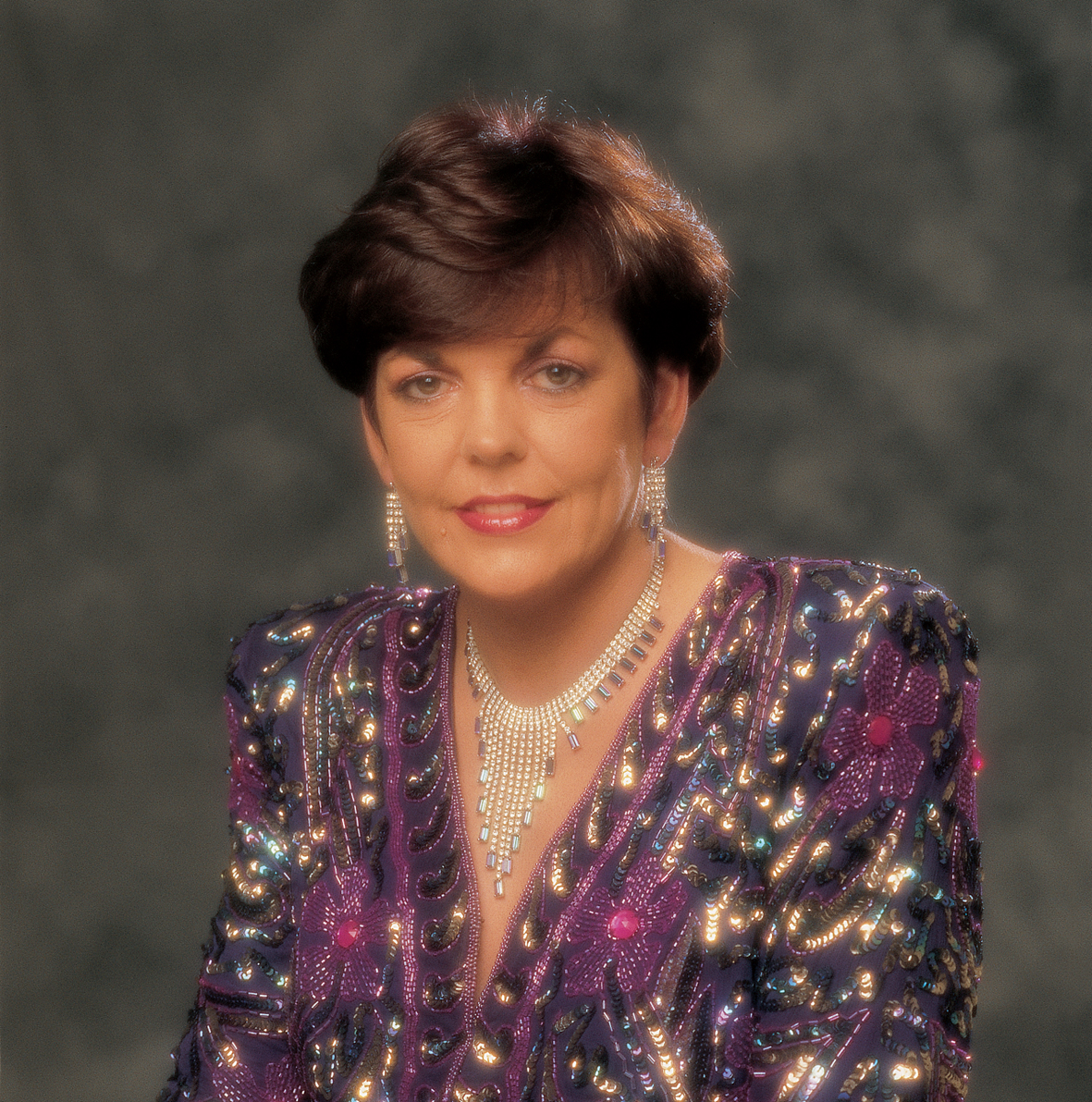

Background information
- Also known as: Ireland's First Lady of Country Music
- Born: 26 February 1949 (age 77); Forkhill, County Armagh
- Genres: Country and Irish, Country, Country folk
- Occupation: Singer
- Instruments: Vocals
- Years active: 1976–present
- Website: www.susanmccann.com

Susan McCann (born 26 February 1949) is an Irish-born country and Irish singer. She had a 1977 hit "Big Tom Is Still the King", which became a Number 1 in the Irish pop charts. Today, McCann is affectionately known as "Irelands First Lady of Country Music".

== About ==
McCann has had enduring international popularity; she has recorded more than 650 songs across her career and toured around the world and performed at numerous prestigious venues including Carnegie Hall and Dollywood. McCann has had recording deals in South Africa and toured Russia, has been recording for over 40 years, and has sung for former US President George H. W. Bush and his son, also a former US President, George W. Bush. Her 1977 hit "Big Tom Is Still the King" became a number 1 hit on the Irish pop charts. She made her first appearance at the Grand Ole Opry in 1979, and won the European Star Award in 1980. She continues to release new albums, including "Through the Years", a compilation triple disc album in 2015. Susan sang in Aberdeen, Scotland for Cannon’s country music radio station. She cut the ribbon on the grand opening of the first country music store in Aberdeen, Scotland for Cannon’s country music. The concert at the Skean Dhu Hotel was a sell-out, with standing room only.

== Albums ==
- Sings Country (Top Spin Records) 1977
- Down the River (Top Spin Records) 1978
- Storybook Country (Top Spin Records) 1980
- Sincerely Yours (Top Spin Records) 1981
- At Home in Ireland (Homespun Records) 1985
- When the Sun Says Goodbye to the Mountains (Top Spin Records) 1985
- Songs Just for You (Homespun Records) 1986
- You Gave Me Love (Gold Record Music) 1990
- Diamond and Dreams (Prism Leisure) 1991
- Memories (Prism Leisure) 1992
- Part of Me (Pegasus) 1998
- Bring Me Sunshine (Prism Leisure) 2002
- The Bellamy Years (H&hmusic)
- Sentimental Journey (H&H Music)
- Once Upon a Time (H&H Music) 2009
- Ireland's First Lady of Country Music (H&H Music) 2010
- Through The Years (H&H Music) 2014
- The Older I Get (H&H Music) 2020
- After All This Time 2024

== Compilation Albums ==
- Best Of (K-Tel) 1981
- Very Best Of: 20 Golden Greats (Prism Leisure) 1998
- Strings of Diamonds (Prism Leisure) 1999
- The Nightingale (Pegasus) 2003
- My Heroes (Prism Leisure) 2005
- The Blayney Years (H&H Music) 2006
- The Nashville Years (H&H Music) 2006
- Great Songs of Susan McCann & Brendan Quinn (Sharp Music) 2015
- Susan McCann in Nashville (Ceol Music Ltd) 2015

== DVDs ==
- My Story in Words, Pictures and 40 Great Songs (2007)
- 40th Anniversary Edition: 40 Great Songs Plus Susan's Best Videos (2009)
- The Ultimate Collection (2014)
