= Brendan Bowyer =

Irish singer (1938–2020)

- Born: 12 October 1938; Waterford, Ireland
- Died: 28 May 2020 (aged 81) Las Vegas, United States
- Genres: Rock and roll
- Occupation: Singer
- Years active: 1957–2020
- Label: Dolphin Records
- Formerly of: The Royal Showband, The Big Eight
- Website: www.brendanbowyer.com

Brendan Bowyer (12 October 1938 – 28 May 2020) was an Irish singer best known for fronting the Royal Showband and The Big Eight, and who had five number-one hits in Ireland. He was also renowned for having The Beatles open for the Royal Showband at a concert on 2 April 1962 at the Pavilion Theatre, Liverpool, England, some six months before the release of The Beatles' first single "Love Me Do", in October 1962. Bowyer was regarded as one of the first headlining Elvis impersonators. Elvis Presley himself was a big fan of Bowyer's performances and would often attend Bowyer's concerts in the Stardust Resort & Casino, Las Vegas during the 1970s.

Although born in Waterford, he relocated to Limerick with his family when he was two years old. There he was educated at the Model School and Crescent College, singing with the Redemptorist choir before returning to Waterford with his parents.

== Career ==
Brendan Bowyer began his career with the Royal Showband in 1957. His ability to tailor American rock and roll music to the tastes of Irish audiences, and his athletic, spirited on-stage performances made him a popular vocalist of the 1960s Irish showband era. On 6 September 1963, Brendan Bowyer and the Royal Showband became the first Irish artists to top the Irish Singles Chart, with the hit "Kiss Me Quick," which stayed at the number one position for seven weeks. They were to return to the top position later that year with "No More," and repeated the feat in 1964 with "Bless You".

Bowyer took part in the 1965 Irish National Song Contest for a chance to represent Ireland at the Eurovision Song Contest in Naples with the song "Suddenly in Love" but could only manage fifth place. Their greatest success was to come in 1965 with "The Hucklebuck," which spent a further seven weeks at the top of the Irish Singles Chart, and was a hit in Australia, but failed to appear in the UK Singles Chart. "Don't Lose Your Hucklebuck Shoes" returned the band to the number one position later in 1965.

In the summer of 1971, Bowyer, along with singer Tom Dunphy, left the Royal Showband and formed the Big Eight Showband. The band spent the summers playing the ballroom circuit in Ireland but also spent six months of the year in Las Vegas. Within a short time, Bowyer and the band made the decision to relocate to Las Vegas permanently. He was based in Las Vegas from then on, though he made frequent trips back to Ireland. In 1977 he made a brief return to the Irish charts with his tribute, "Thank You Elvis."

== Death ==
Bowyer died on 28 May 2020, at the age of 81.
