= Pat Lynch (singer) =

Irish showband musician and singer (died 2018)

- Born: 1933; Blackpool, Cork, Ireland
- Died: 26 January 2018 (age 84)
- Genres: Irish folk, showband
- Occupation: Singer
- Instrument: Vocals
- Years active: 1964–1970s
- Labels: Ruby
- Formerly of: The Airchords

Pat Lynch (1933 – 26 January 2018) was an Irish singer and entertainer of the showband genre born in Cork.

== Early life ==
Lynch was born into a musical family in Blackpool, Cork. He was singing in the Palm Court Ballroom, Oliver Plunkett Street when he was just six years old. He qualified as a welder.

== Career ==
Pat Lynch's brother Steve was a member of The Dixies, a successful showband in the 1960s. Pat got his break in 1964 when he was recruited into The Clipper Carlton showband. In 1965 he became the lead singer of the Airchords, a band founded by Irish Air Corps members. They had their first number one on the Irish Singles Chart in 1967–68 with "Treat Me Daughter Kindly." In 1971 Lynch left the Airchords had a solo number one with "When We Were Young," which became the team anthem of Cork Hibernians F.C. In 1972–73 Lynch toured with Derek Davis, who played "Mean Tom", a parody of Big Tom; Pat Lynch, Mean Tom and the Treetops performed until September 1973.

== Later life ==
Lynch returned to welding, teaching it at the Cork Regional Technical College. He died in 2018.
