= Give It a Lash Jack =

Single by Liam Harrison and the GOAL Celebrities
- B-side: "The Boys in Green" (Dublin City Ramblers)
- Released: 1990
- Recorded: 1990
- Genre: Novelty
- Length: 3:22
- Label: Dolphin Records
- Producer: John Drummond

"Give It a Lash Jack" is a song by Liam Harrison and the GOAL Celebrities. The song was released to mark Ireland's 1990 FIFA World Cup campaign.

It reached number one in the Irish Singles Chart in May 1990 and stayed there for 2 non-consecutive weeks. It was followed up in 1994 by "Give It A Lash Again".

In a 2011 interview on RTÉ Television, film director Jim Sheridan said that he and Bono had agreed that "Give It A Lash Jack" was the "greatest Irish song ever written".

The song is sung in the Sky TV series Moone Boy, series 2 episode 1, which takes place during the 1990 World Cup.
