= Kerri Ann =

- Born: Kerrie Ann Keogh; 3 December 1977 (age 48); Rotunda Hospital, Dublin, Ireland
- Genres: Dance-pop
- Occupations: Singer, actress
- Years active: 1998
- Label: PolyGram

Kerrie Ann Keogh (born 3 December 1979), known as Kerri Ann, is an Irish pop singer and actress.

== Early life and education ==
Kerrie Ann Keogh grew up in Tallaght.

== Career ==
Keogh's first single, "Do You Love Me Boy?", reached #2 in Ireland, while the follow-up, "Irreplaceable", reached #1. She was managed by Louis Walsh.

Year	Single	Peak chart positions	
Year	Single	IRE	UK
1998	"Do You Love Me Boy?"	2	58
1998	"Irreplaceable"	1	163

== Personal and later life ==
In 2006 Keogh was working as a personal stylist with Katie Price. As of 2017, she was working for M&M Production Management.
