= Mick Lally =

Irish actor (1945–2010)

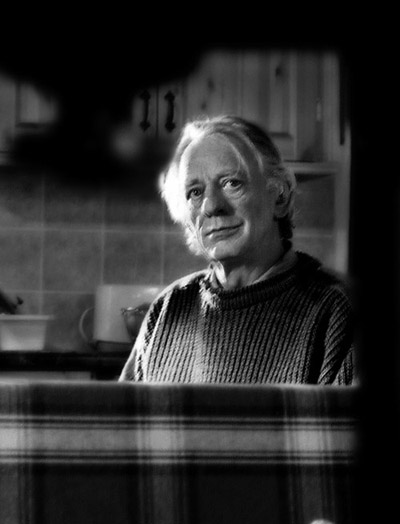
- Born: Michael Lally; 10 November 1945; Tourmakeady, County Mayo, Ireland
- Died: 31 August 2010 (aged 64); Dublin, Ireland
- Occupation: Actor
- Years active: 1974–2010
- Spouse: Peige Ní Chonghaile (m. 1979)
- Children: 3

Michael Lally (10 November 1945 – 31 August 2010) was an Irish stage, film, and television actor. He left a teaching career for acting during the 1970s. Though best known in Ireland for his role as Miley Byrne in the television soap Glenroe, Lally's stage career spanned several decades, and he was involved in feature films such as Alexander and the Academy Award-nominated The Secret of Kells. He died in August 2010 of emphysema. Many reports cited him as one of Ireland's finest and most recognisable actors.

== Early life ==
Born in November 1945 and reared in the Gaeltacht village of Tourmakeady, County Mayo, Michael "Mick" Lally was the eldest child of May and Tommy Lally. He had five sisters and one brother. He went to the local national school in Tourmakeady and then to St Mary's College, Galway. After studying history and Irish at University College Galway, where he won the British and Irish intervarsity boxing championship and performed in the student drama society, he taught for six years in Archbishop McHale College, Tuam from 1969 to 1975, but quit teaching to pursue his career as a stage actor.

== Career ==
Lally began his acting career with Taibhdhearc na Gaillimhe (Ireland's national Irish language theatre), and was a founding member of the Druid Theatre Company. Lally received an Irish Times/ESB Irish Theatre Awards Nomination for Best Actor for his role in Druid's production of The Dead School. He also became a member of the Field Day Theatre Company, and starred in the company's 1980 premiere of Brian Friel's play Translations. He first played at the Abbey Theatre in 1977 in a production of Wild Oats and went on to perform in many other Abbey productions.

In 1982, Lally starred in the TV series The Ballroom of Romance alongside Brenda Fricker. From 1983 he played the role of farmer Miley Byrne in the RTÉ soap Glenroe, reprising the character that he played earlier in the Bracken series in 1978. In 1979, Lally won a Jacob's Award for his performance as Miley in Bracken.

Lally also had some musical success when "The By-road to Glenroe" went to the top of the Irish charts in 1990. He was also involved in voice-over work – including a noted advertisement for Kilmeaden Cheese during the 1990s. Other TV appearances included roles in Tales of Kinvarna, The Year of the French and Ballykissangel.

In 1994, Lally played the character Hugh in The Secret of Roan Inish, and in 1995 portrayed Dan Hogan in the film adaptation of Maeve Binchy's Circle of Friends. Other film roles included: Poitín, Our Boys, The Outcasts, A Man of No Importance and others. In later years, Lally provided the voice of Brother Aidan in the Academy Award-nominated The Secret of Kells – an animated film directed by Tomm Moore.

Lally appeared in several TV advertisements encouraging elderly people to "release the equity tied up in their homes" during the Celtic Tiger.

== Personal life ==
Lally was married to a nurse, Peige Ní Chonghaile, with whom he celebrated his 30th wedding anniversary the year before his death. They had three children: Saileog, Darach, and Maghnus.

Lally was a fluent speaker of the Irish language, and his children studied in Irish-speaking schools (gaelscoileanna). He appeared in several Irish language productions throughout his career, from Poitín in 1978 to an appearance in the Irish language soap Ros na Rún in 2008.

He was a supporter of socialist causes, and canvassed for Socialist Party candidate Joe Higgins in the 1996 Dublin West by-election and the 1997 general election. Lally was an atheist who did not believe in an afterlife, and regarded religion as nonsense and "codology".

== Death ==
Lally died on the morning of 31 August 2010, after a short stay in hospital. The cause of death was reported as heart failure arising from an underlying emphysema condition. His death led to "widespread outpourings of sympathy". In addition to his wife and children, he was survived by his parents and six siblings.

Taoiseach Brian Cowen said he was "shocked and saddened" by Lally's death, adding that he was "one of the most loved actors of his generation and will be dearly missed by the public and his colleagues in theatre and television". Minister for Culture Mary Hanafin and Michael D. Higgins TD, former Minister for Arts, Culture & Gaeltacht, also expressed condolences. Arts Council of Ireland chair Pat Moylan called it "a sad and shocking loss". Lally's onscreen wife in Glenroe, Mary McEvoy, said "Mick and I loved each other and we got on really well".

Lally's funeral took place in Dublin on 2 September 2010. The Irish Examiner commented that the "nation has lost one of its favourite uncles". Personalities from TV, film, theatre, and politics attended, while President of Ireland Mary McAleese sent a letter of condolence.

== Selected filmography ==
- The Secret of Kells (2009)
- Ros na Rún (2008)
- Alexander (2004)
- How to Cheat in the Leaving Certificate (1997)
- Circle of Friends (1995)
- The Secret of Roan Inish (1994)
- A Man of No Importance (1994)
- Fools of Fortune (1990)
- The Fantasist (1986)
- Glenroe (1983)
- The Outcasts (1982)
- The Year of the French (1982)
- The Ballroom of Romance (1982)
- Strumpet City (1980)
- Poitín (1978)
- Bracken (1978)

== Theatre roles ==
- Translations, as Manus (1980)
- The Year of the Hiker (1990)
- The Man from Clare (1992)
- The Field (2003)
- DruidSynge (2005)
- The Matchmaker (2010)
