= List of artists who reached number one in Ireland =

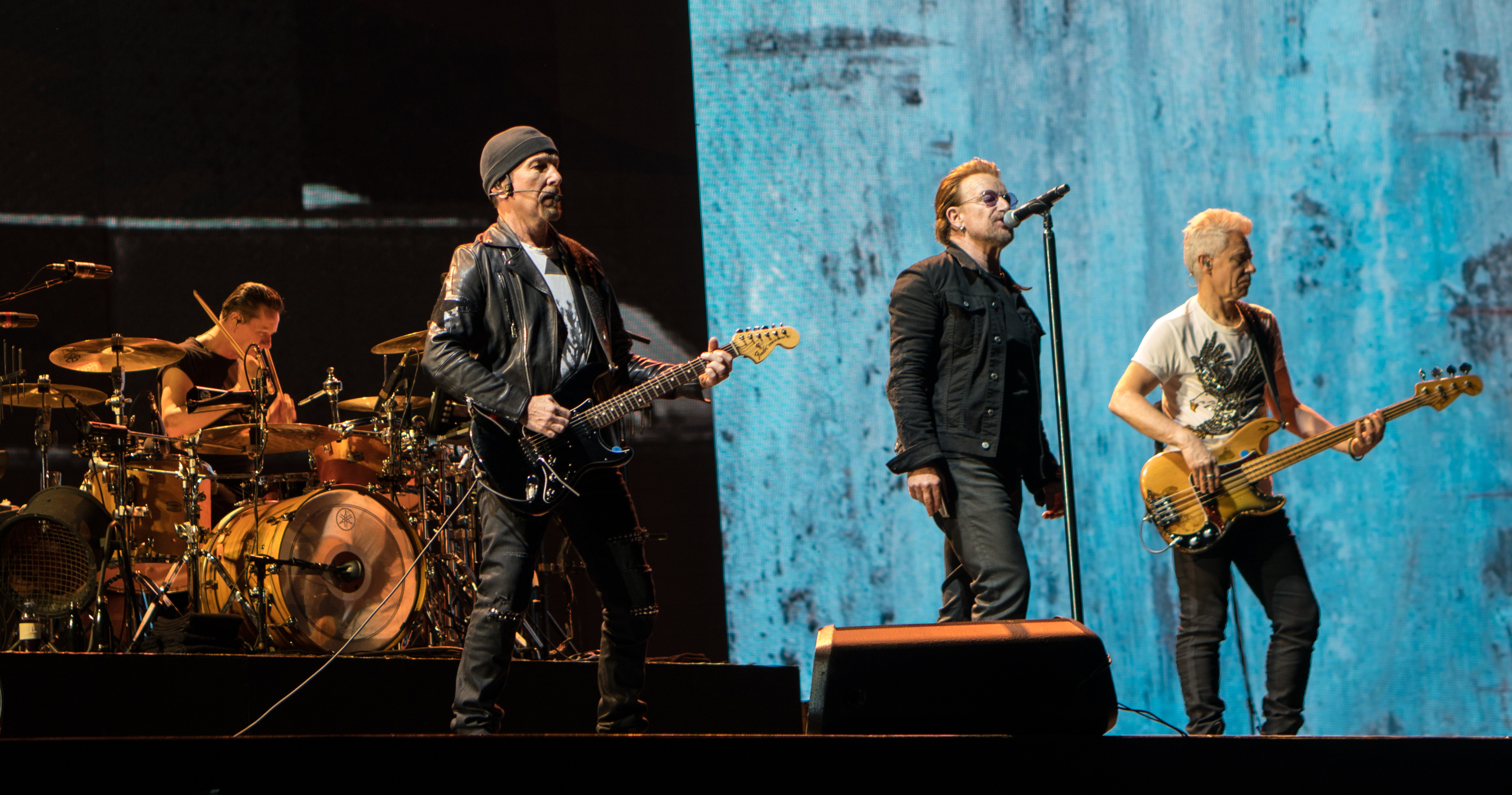
U2 hold the record for the most number-one songs and by group with 21.

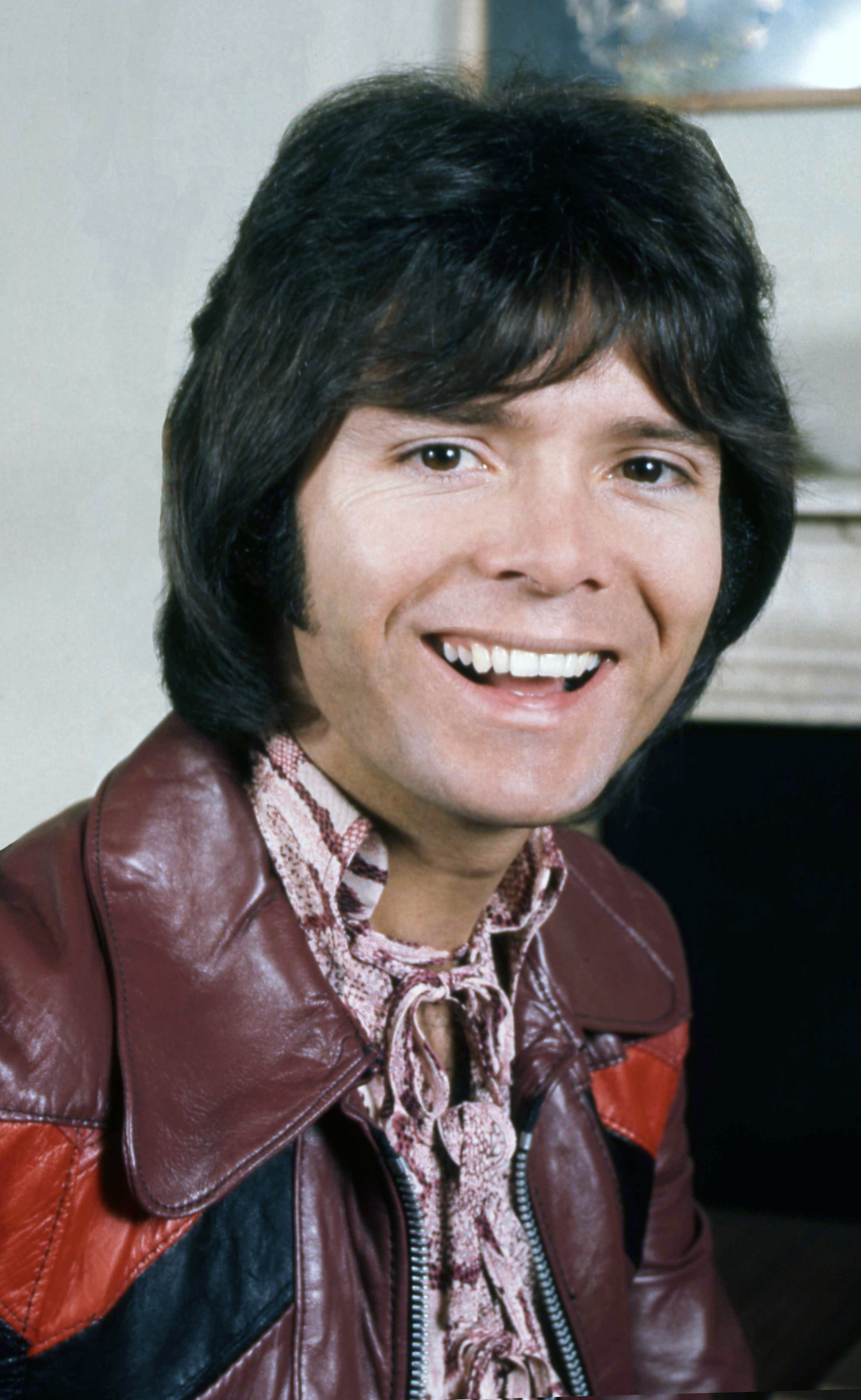
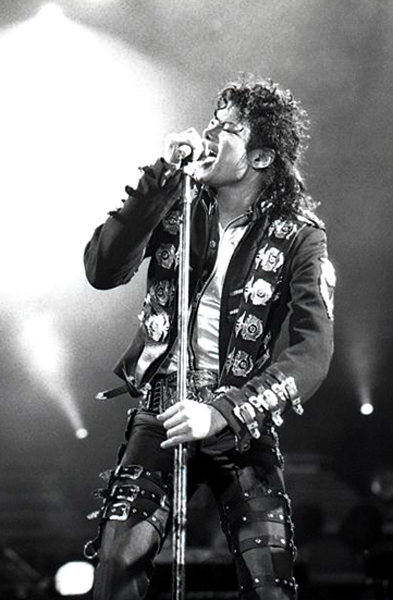
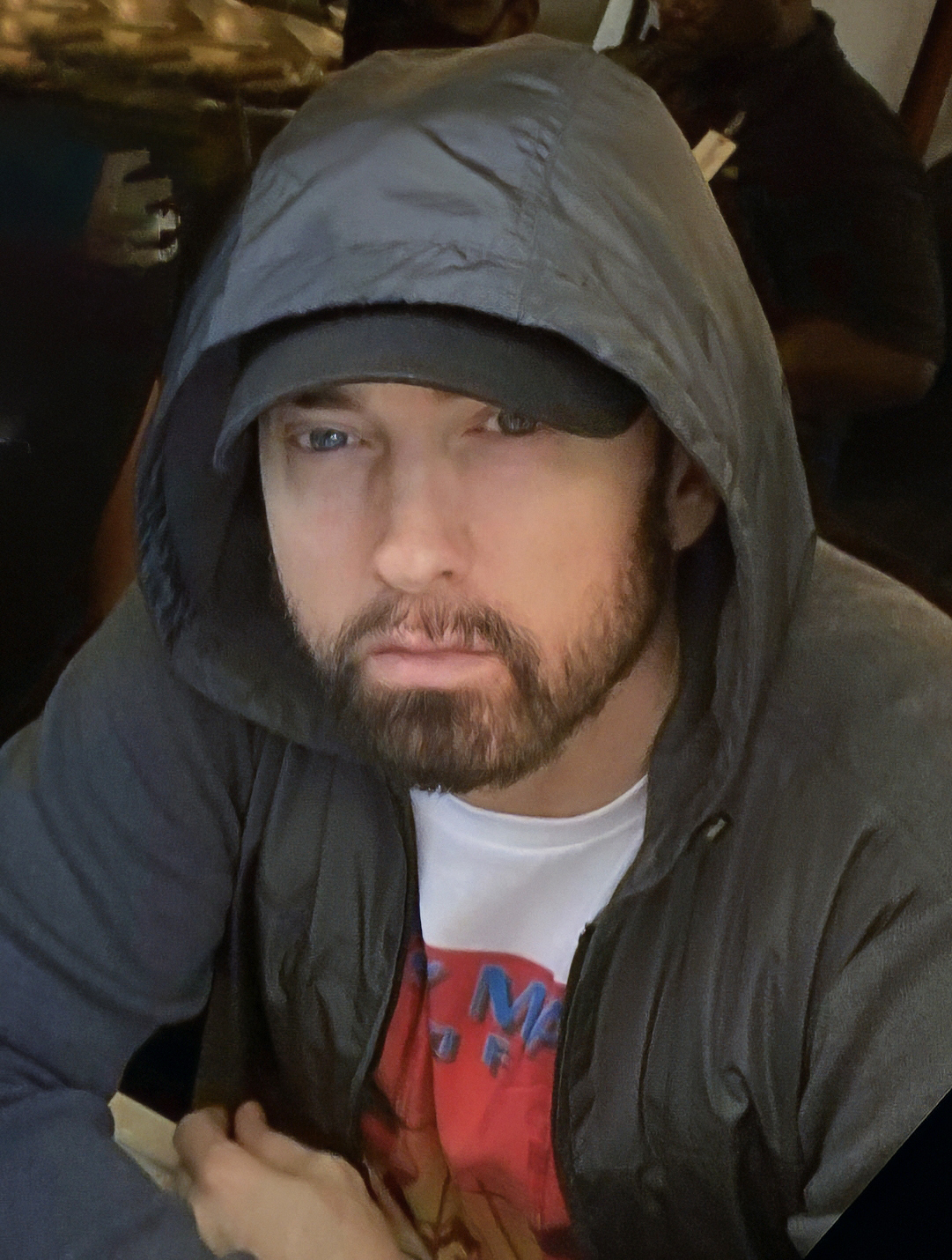
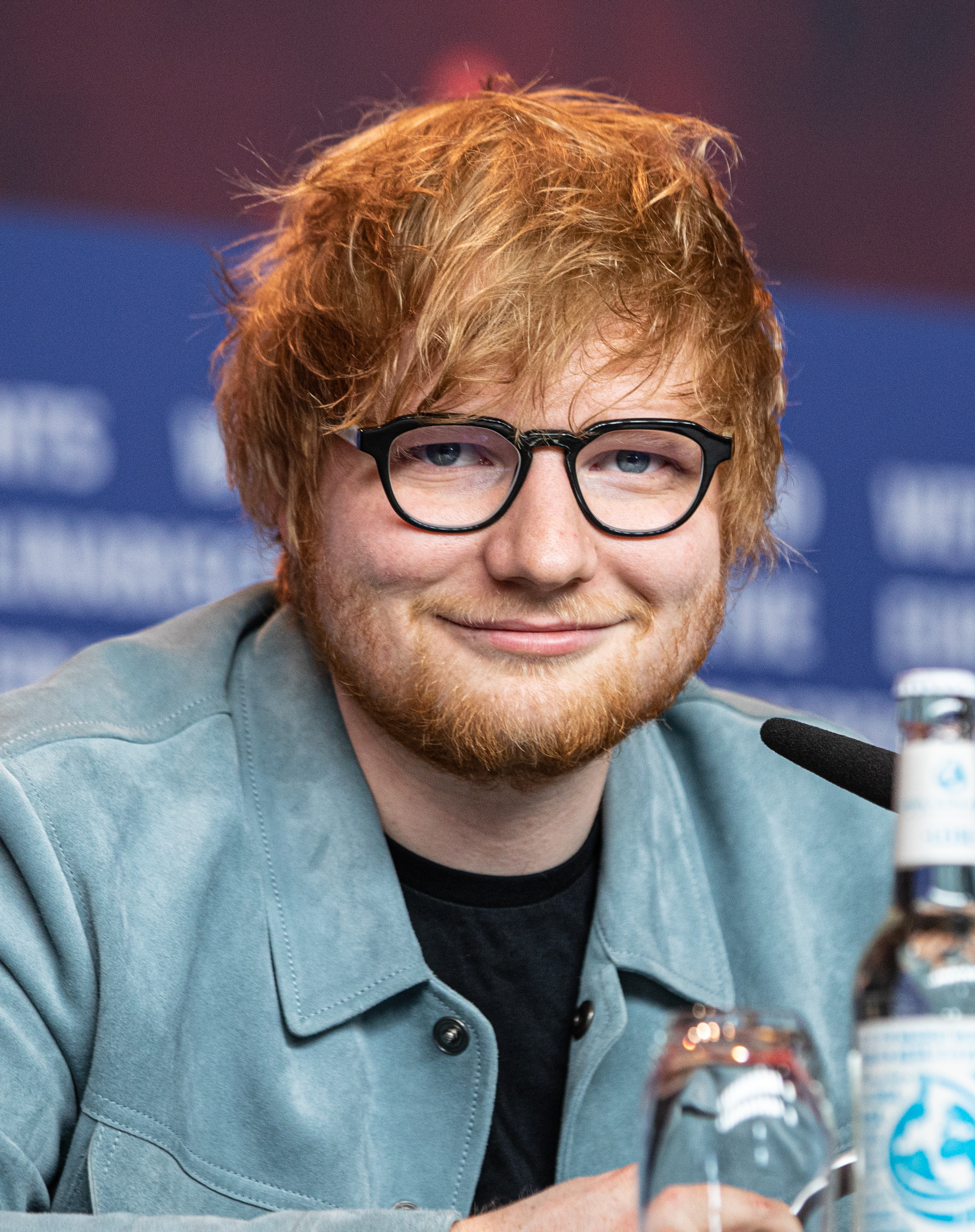
Cliff Richard, Michael Jackson, Eminem and Ed Sheeran are tied the record for the most number-one songs by a male artist with 9
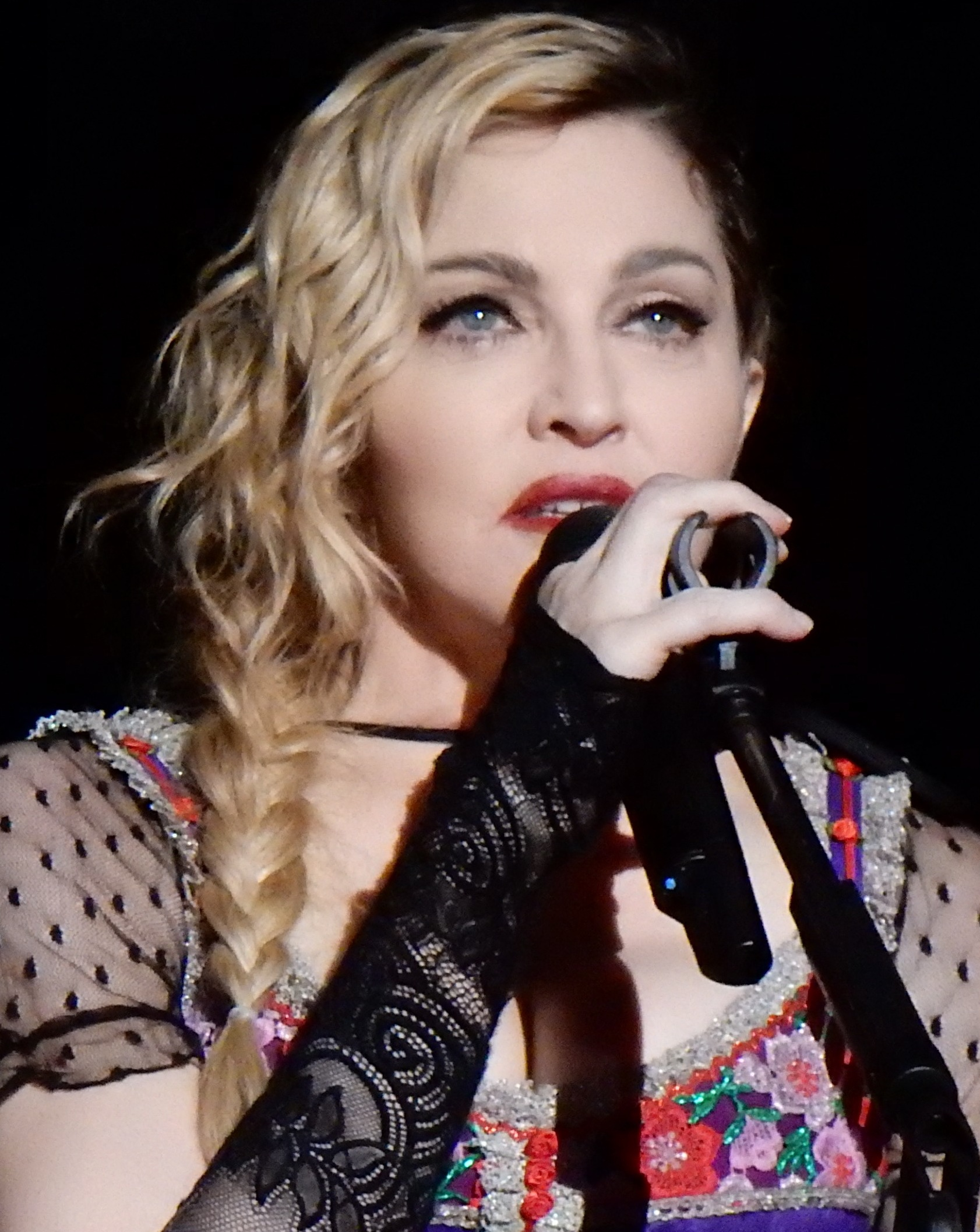
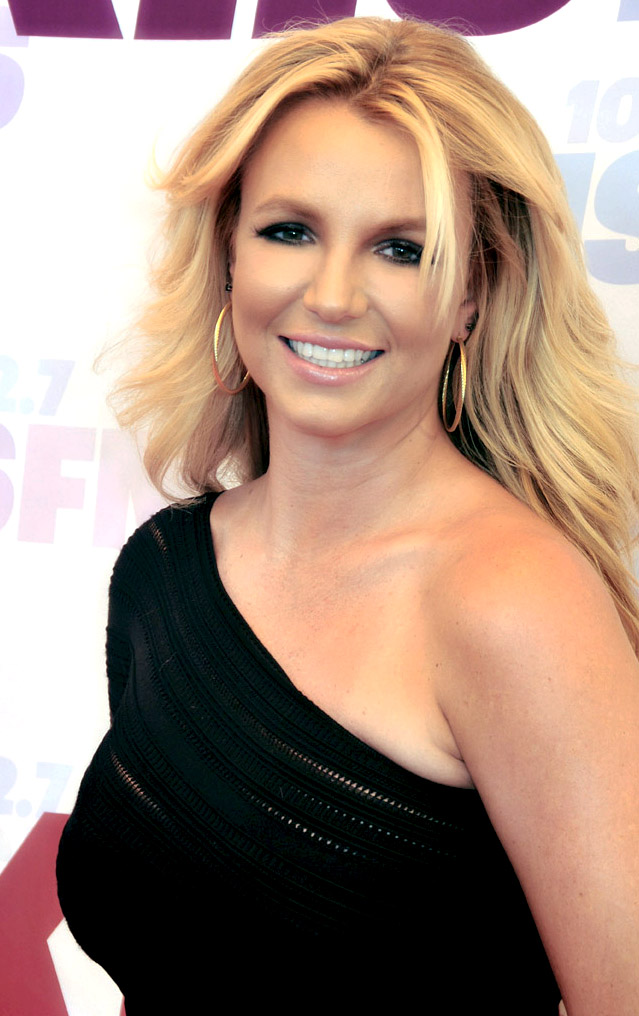
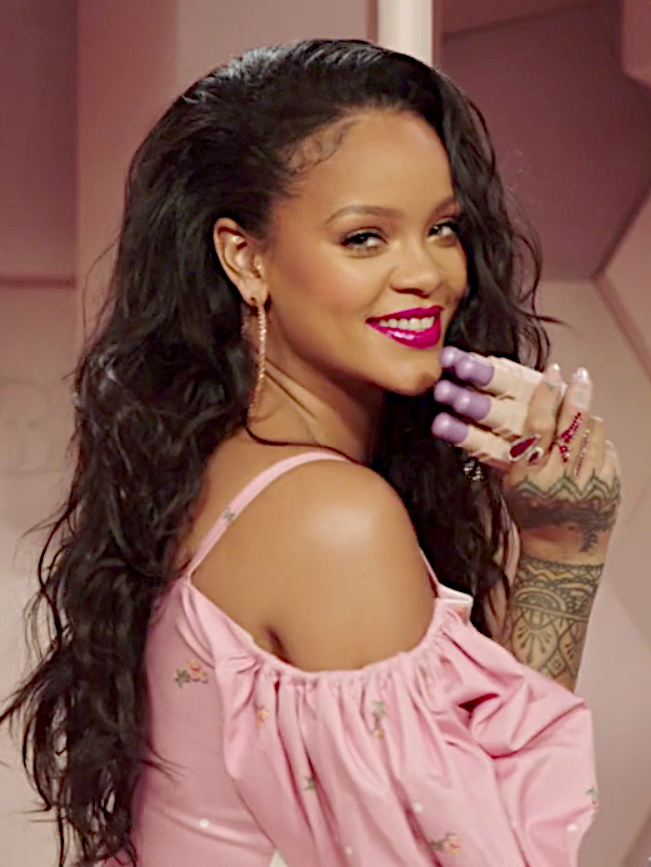
Madonna, Britney Spears and Rihanna are tied the record for most number one-singles for a female artist with 8.

This is an list of recording artists who have reached number one on the Irish Singles Chart.

- All acts are listed alphabetically.
- Solo artists are alphabetised by last name, Groups by group name excluding "A," "An" and "The.".
- Each act's total of number-one singles is shown after their name.
- Featured artists that have been given credit on the record are included

== 0–9 ==
- 112 (1)
- 2Pac (1)
- 2 Unlimited (2)
- 4 Non Blondes (1)
- 5 Seconds Of Summer (2)
- 070 Shake (1)
- 10cc (3)
- 21 Demands (1)
- 21 Savage (1)
- 24kGoldn (1)
- 50 Cent (1)
- Jawsh 685 (1)

== A ==
- ABBA (12)
- Adam and the Ants (1)
- Bryan Adams (5)
- Gracie Abrams (2)
- Adele (4)
- Adassa (1)
- Aerosmith (1)
- Afrojack (1)
- Afroman (1)
- Fred Again (1)
- Christina Aguilera (4)
- A-ha (1)
- Akon (3)
- All Saints (1)
- Lily Allen (1)
- Marc Almond (1)
- Amble (1)
- Lynn Anderson (1)
- Chris Andrews (1)
- Aneka (1)
- Kerri Ann (1)
- Anne-Marie (1)
- Annia (1)
- Aqua (2)
- Tasmin Archer (1)
- The Archies (1)
- James Arthur (2)
- Ashe (1)
- Rick Astley (1)
- ATB (1)
- Atomic Kitten (2)
- Avicii (1)
- Iggy Azalea (1)
- Charles Aznavour (1)

== B ==
- Cardi B (1)
- B*Witched (1)
- The B-52's (1)
- B.o.B (1)
- Babylon Zoo (1)
- Baccara (1)
- The Bachelors (1)
- Philip Bailey (1)
- Sam Bailey (1)
- Band Aid (1)
- Band Aid II (1)
- Band Aid 20 (1)
- Band Aid 30 (1)
- A Band of Bowsies (1)
- The Bangles (1)
- The Barleycorn (1)
- Basshunter (2)
- Bastille (1)
- James Bay (1)
- The Bay City Rollers (2)
- The Beatles (13)
- Stephanie Beatriz (1)
- Robin Beck (1)
- Natasha Bedingfield (1)
- The Bee Gees (5)
- Lou Bega (1)
- Belters Only (1)
- Chuck Berry (1)
- Berlin (1)
- Beyoncé (6)
- Justin Bieber (7)
- Big Country (1)
- Big Tom and The Mainliners (2)
- Birdy (1)
- Black Box (1)
- Cilla Black (1)
- The Black Eyed Peas (4)
- Benny Blanco (1)
- Blondie (1)
- Bloodhound Gang (1)
- The Bluebells (1)
- James Blunt (1)
- Blur (1)
- Andrea Bocelli (1)
- Bombalurina (1)
- Bon Jovi (1)
- Boney M (3)
- The Boomtown Rats (1)
- Benson Boone (1)
- Ken Boothe (1)
- David Bowie (3)
- Boyz II Men (1)
- Boyzone (9)
- Brendan Bowyer and Royal Showband (5)
- Brian and Michael (1)
- Sarah Brightman (2)
- Bros (3)
- Brother Beyond (1)
- Brotherhood Of Man (3)
- Chris Brown (1)
- Zach Bryan (1)
- Bucks Fizz (2)
- The Buggles (1)
- Chris De Burgh (2)
- Alexandra Burke (3)
- Kate Bush (2)
- The Byrds (1)

== C ==
- Daniel Caesar (1)
- Camila Cabello (2)
- The Cadets (2)
- Glen Campbell (1)
- Blu Cantrell (1)
- Lewis Capaldi (3)
- Captain Sensible (1)
- Cassö (1)
- Irene Cara (1)
- Matt Cardle (1)
- Mariah Carey (2)
- Belinda Carlisle (1)
- Sabrina Carpenter (4)
- The Carpenters (1)
- Doc Carroll and The Royal Blues (1)
- Cassandra (1)
- Mauro Castillo (1)
- Doja Cat (1)
- Cascada (1)
- The Cascades (1)
- Simon Casey (1)
- Johnny Cash (1)
- David Cassidy (1)
- Central Cee (1)
- The Chainsmokers (1)
- Tracy Chapman (1)
- Tina Charles (1)
- Charlene (1)
- Tina Charles (1)
- Chef (1)
- Cher (2)
- Cheryl (4)
- Chicago (2)
- DJ Chucky (1)
- Chumbawamba (1)
- The Christians (1)
- Tony Christie (1)
- Eric Clapton (1)
- Petula Clark (1)
- Clean Bandit (3)
- Clout (1)
- Commodores (1)
- Coolio (1)
- Phil Collins (5)
- Perry Como (1)
- Communards, The (1)
- Rita Connolly (1)
- Bradley Cooper (1)
- Joel Corry (1)
- Julie Covington (1)
- Crazy Frog (1)
- Creedence Clearwater Revival (1)
- Interplanetary Criminal (1)
- The Crooklyn Clan (1)
- Taio Cruz (1)
- Joe Cuddy (2)
- Culture Beat (1)
- Culture Club (3)
- Larry Cunningham (2)
- Miley Cyrus (1)

== D ==
- Terence Trent D'Arby (1)
- DaBaby (1)
- Puff Daddy (1)
- Daft Punk (1)
- Dana (2)
- Dawn (2)
- Dave (2)
- D-Block Europe (1)
- F. R. David (1)
- DCUP (1)
- Dead End Kids (1)
- Dead or Alive (1)
- Olivia Dean (2)
- Kiki Dee (1)
- Def Leppard (1)
- John Denver (1)
- Delerium (1)
- Jason Derulo (1)
- Destiny's Child (2)
- Detroit Spinners (1)
- Dexys Midnight Runners and the Emerald Express (1)
- Jim Diamond (1)
- Neil Diamond (1)
- Dickie Rock (8)
- Barbara Dickson (1)
- Céline Dion (2)
- Iann Dior (1)
- Julie-Anne Dineen (1)
- Diplo (1)
- Dire Straits (1)
- Doctor and the Medics (1)
- Ken Dodd (1)
- D.O.E (1)
- Snoop Dogg (1)
- Jason Donovan (6)
- Joe Dolan (5)
- The Doors (1)
- Chris Doran (1)
- Paul Doran (1)
- Carl Douglas (1)
- Danny Doyle (3)
- Dr. Hook (2)
- Drake (3)
- Tommy Drennan (1)
- The Dubliners (4)
- Duffy (1)
- Duke Dumont (1)
- Sean Dunphy (2)
- Duran Duran (1)
- Dustin the Turkey (7)

== E ==
- Eamon (1)
- East 17 (2)
- Edison Lighthouse (1)
- Dave Edmunds (1)
- Eiffel 65 (1)
- ELO (1)
- Billie Eilish (5)
- Eminem (9)
- Emmet Spiceland Ballad Group (1)
- Encanto Cast (1)
- Enigma (2)
- Enya (1)
- Erasure (1)
- David Essex (2)
- Europe (1)
- Eurythmics (1)
- Faith Evans (1)
- Eve (1)
- Example (1)
- George Ezra (1)

== F ==
- Fairground Attraction (1)
- Marianne Faithfull (1)
- Falco (1)
- Harold Faltermeyer (1)
- Fatman Scoop (1)
- Rhenzy Feliz (1)
- Sam Fender (1)
- Fergie (1)
- The Firm (1)
- Florence and the Machine (1)
- The Flying Pickets (1)
- Luis Fonsi (1)
- Fool's Garden (1)
- Foreigner (1)
- Foster & Allen (1)
- Cass Fox (1)
- Frankie Goes to Hollywood (1)
- Aretha Franklin (1)
- The Fray (1)
- The Fugees (1)
- Finbar Furey (1)
- The Fureys and Davey Arthur (2)
- Fun (1)

== G ==
- Gabrielle (1)
- Lady Gaga (7)
- Carolina Gaitán (1)
- Boris Gardiner (1)
- Art Garfunkel (1)
- Siedah Garrett (1)
- Barbara Gaskin (1)
- Gareth Gates (1)
- Gayle (1)
- Gloria Gaynor (1)
- Bob Geldof (1)
- Boy George (1)
- Girls Aloud (1)
- Giveon (1)
- GOAL celebrities (1)
- Glee Cast (1)
- Gary Glitter (2)
- Gloria (1)
- Jess Glynne (1)
- Gnarls Barkley (1)
- Selena Gomez (1)
- Delta Goodrem (1)
- Goombay Dance Band (1)
- Ellie Goulding (2)
- Nigel Goulding (1)
- Gotye (1)
- Brendan Grace (1)
- Norman Greenbaum (1)
- Green Day (1)
- Ariana Grande (7)
- Macy Gray (1)
- Eddy Grant (1)
- Gregory and the Cadets (1)
- David Guetta (2)
- Diane Guerrero (1)
- Guns N' Roses (3)
- Guys 'n' Dolls (1)

== H ==
- Geri Halliwell (1)
- Haddaway (1)
- Halsey (2)
- Hanson (1)
- Paul Hardcastle (1)
- Calvin Harris (8)
- Rolf Harris (1)
- George Harrison (2)
- Liam Harrison (1)
- Mickey Harte (1)
- Lee Hazlewood (1)
- Dermot Hegarty (1)
- Helping Haiti (1)
- Ella Henderson (1)
- Dermot Henry (1)
- Herman's Hermits (1)
- Keri Hilson (1)
- Hometown (2)
- Dr. Hook (2)
- Hothouse Flowers (1)
- The Housemartins (1)
- Whitney Houston (2)
- Hozier (1)
- The Human League (2)
- Red Hurley (4)
- Steve "Silk" Hurley (1)
- Chrissie Hynde (1)

== I ==
- Frank Ifield (3)
- Enrique Iglesias (1)
- Julio Iglesias (1)
- Industry (2)
- Irish World Cup Squad (2002) (1)

== J ==
- Terry Jacks (1)
- Mick Jagger (1)
- The Jam (1)
- DJ Jazzy Jeff & the Fresh Prince (1)
- Jazzy (2)
- Wyclef Jean (1)
- Jessie J (2)
- Leon Jackson (1)
- Michael Jackson (9)
- Jay-Z (3)
- Jedward (3)
- Carly Rae Jepsen (1)
- Saint Jhn (1)
- Vika Jigulina (1)
- Jive Bunny and the Mastermixers (3)
- Elton John (5)
- Scatman John (1)
- The Johnny Flynn Showband (1)
- Holly Johnson (1)
- The Johnstons (1)
- Lil Jon (1)
- Jax Jones (1)
- Sandie Jones (1)
- JXL (1)

== K ==
- Kajagoogoo (1)
- Noah Kahan (2)
- Niamh Kavanagh (1)
- Richie Kavanagh (1)
- Bella Kay (1)
- Peter Kay (1)
- KC and the Sunshine Band (1)
- Dolores Keane (1)
- Glen Keating (1)
- Ronan Keating (2)
- Kelis (1)
- R. Kelly (2)
- Dermot Kennedy (2)
- John Kerr (1)
- Kerri Ann (1)
- Kesha (1)
- Khalid (1)
- Wiz Khalifa (1)
- Chaka Khan (1)
- Kid Rock (1)
- The Kids from "Fame" (1)
- Kíla (1)
- Lil' Kim (1)
- Kimbra (1)
- B. B. King (1)
- Kingfishr (2)
- Ben E. King (1)
- Kings of Leon (1)
- Sean Kingston (1)
- The Kinks (2)
- Kodaline (1)
- Uncle Kracker (1)
- Kris Kross (1)
- Kyla (1)

== L ==
- Patti LaBelle (1)
- Labrinth (1)
- Mick Lally (1)
- Kendrick Lamar (1)
- Ella Langley (1)
- Las Ketchup (1)
- Cyndi Lauper (1)
- Avril Lavigne (2)
- John Legend (1)
- John Lennon (3)
- Leona Lewis (3)
- Lieutenant Pigeon (1)
- Lilly Wood and the Prick (1)
- Limp Bizkit (1)
- Linkin Park (1)
- Dua Lipa (5)
- Little Mix (3)
- LMFAO (1)
- Johnny Logan (2)
- Kareen Lomax (1)
- Jennifer Lopez (2)
- Lorde (1)
- Loreen (1)
- Lost Frequencies (2)
- Los Lobos (1)
- Demi Lovato (1)
- Ludacris (1)
- The Ludlows (1)
- Baz Luhrmann (1)
- Lukas Graham (1)
- Lykke Li (1)
- Pat Lynch (2)

== M ==
- MØ (2)
- Macklemore and Ryan Lewis (1)
- Madonna (8)
- Mad'House (1)
- Madness (2)
- Post Malone (2)
- The Manhattan Transfer (1)
- Margo (1)
- Maroon 5 (1)
- Bruno Mars (3)
- Gerry Marsden (1)
- The MASH (1)
- Johnny Mathis (1)
- Kirsty MacColl (1)
- Linda Martin (1)
- Ricky Martin (1)
- Kelly Marie (1)
- Marilyn Martin (1)
- Lee Marvin (1)
- Richard Marx (1)
- Charlie Matthews (1)
- Major Lazer (2)
- Post Malone (2)
- Edward Maya (1)
- Ava Max (1)
- Mark McCabe (1)
- Susan McCann (1)
- Michael McDonald (1)
- Mark Ronson (1)
- Joe McElderry (1)
- Paul McCartney (5)
- Eleanor McEvoy (1)
- Johnny McEvoy (3)
- Brian McFadden (3)
- McFly (1)
- Tim McGraw (1)
- Don McLean (1)
- Tate Mcrae (1)
- Ralph McTell (1)
- Abigail Mead (1)
- Meduza (1)
- Meat Loaf (1)
- Glenn Medeiros (1)
- Men at Work (1)
- The Memories (1)
- Men Utd (1)
- Shawn Mendes (1)
- Freddie Mercury (1)
- George Michael (6)
- Middle of the Road (1)
- Mika (1)
- Mike and the Mechanics (1)
- Jamie Miller (1)
- Ned Miller (1)
- Millie (1)
- Milk and Honey (1)
- Milky Chance (1)
- Kylie Minogue (6)
- MNEK (1)
- Modjo (1)
- Janelle Monáe (1)
- The Monkees (2)
- Hugo Montenegro (1)
- Monty Python (1)
- The Moody Blues (1)
- Butch Moore and The Capitol Showband (2)
- Chris Moore (1)
- Christy Moore (1)
- Leanne Moore (1)
- Dermot Morgan (1)
- Mouth and McNeal (1)
- Nana Mouskouri (1)
- Mud (3)
- Samantha Mumba (2)
- Mundy (1)
- Mungo Jerry (1)
- Musical Youth (1)
- Mýa (2)

== N ==
- N-Dubz (1)
- Neil (1)
- Ne-Yo (1)
- Jimmy Nail (1)
- Johnny Nash (1)
- Lil Nas X (2)
- Nayer (1)
- Nelly (2)
- Nena (1)
- Aaron Neville (1)
- Jason Nevins (1)
- The New Seekers (3)
- New Kids On The Block (1)
- Olivia Newton-John (5)
- Anne-Marie Nicholson (1)
- Nickelback (1)
- Nicole (1)
- Nilsson (1)
- Nizlopi (1)
- No Doubt (1)
- No Mercy (1)
- No Sweat (1)

== O ==
- Sinéad O'Connor (1)
- Colby O'Donis (1)
- Daniel O'Donnell (2)
- Gilbert O'Sullivan (3)
- Tim O'Riordan and Natural Gas (1)
- O-Zone (1)
- Oasis (4)
- Billy Ocean (2)
- Of Monsters And Men (1)
- The Offspring (1)
- Ol' Dirty Bastard (1)
- Mike Oldfield (1)
- OMC (1)
- OMI (1)
- One Direction (6)
- Donny Osmond (1)
- Little Jimmy Osmond (1)
- The Osmonds (1)
- Ottawan (1)
- DJ Ötzi (1)
- Owl City (1)
- Rita Ora (1)
- The Outhere Brothers (2)

== P ==
- Paddywagon (1)
- Elaine Paige (1)
- Paper Lace (1)
- Sean Paul (3)
- Freda Payne (1)
- Gigi Perez (1)
- Katy Perry (4)
- Peters and Lee (1)
- The Pet Shop Boys (4)
- Kim Petras (1)
- Pilot (1)
- Pink (4)
- Pink Floyd (1)
- Pitbull (3)
- Gene Pitney (1)
- The Pogues (2)
- The Pointer Sisters (1)
- The Police (6)
- The Poppy Family (1)
- Brian Poole and The Tremeloes (2)
- Mike Posner (1)
- Daniel Powter (1)
- Pérez Prado (1)
- Pras (1)
- Elvis Presley (8)
- Billy Preston (1)
- Johnny Preston (1)
- The Pretenders (1)
- The Prodigy (1)
- Eric Prydz (1)
- The Pussycat Dolls (2)
- Pussycat (1)
- Charlie Puth (1)

== Q ==
- Suzi Quatro (1)
- Queen (3)
- Brendan Quinn (1)

== R ==
- A. R. Rahman (1)
- Rain (1)
- Raye (2)
- Rayvon (1)
- Redman (1)
- Jim Reeves (3)
- Regard (1)
- Eileen Reid (1)
- Paddy Reilly (1)
- Republic of Ireland national football team (2)
- Renée and Renato (1)
- Tina Reynolds (2)
- Roddy Ricch (1)
- The Tony Rich Project (1)
- Cliff Richard (9)
- Lionel Richie (1)
- Flo Rida (6)
- Right Said Fred (2)
- The Righteous Brothers (1)
- Rihanna (8)
- Rikrok (1)
- LeAnn Rimes (1)
- Chappell Roan (1)
- Nile Rodgers (1)
- Olivia Rodrigo (6)
- Kenny Rogers (1)
- Mark Ronson (1)
- Linda Ronstadt (1)
- Eliza Rose (1)
- Mario Rosenstock (1)
- Diana Ross (2)
- The Royal Blues (1)
- Royal Scots Dragoon Guards (1)
- Kelly Rowland (2)
- Roxy Music (1)
- Nate Ruess (1)
- Run-DMC (1)
- Jennifer Rush (1)
- Russ Millions (1)
- Greg Ryan (1)

== S ==
- S Club 7 (1)
- Sailor (1)
- Emeli Sandé (2)
- Sash! (1)
- Telly Savalas (1)
- The Saw Doctors (3)
- Leo Sayer (2)
- Scooter (1)
- Calum Scott (1)
- The Script (3)
- Nicole Scherzinger (1)
- Robin Schulz (1)
- The Searchers (3)
- The Seekers (1)
- The Self Aid Band (1)
- Shaboozey (1)
- The Shadows (1)
- Shaggy (4)
- Shakespears Sister (1)
- Shakin' Stevens (5)
- Shakira (4)
- Del Shannon (1)
- Sharon Shannon (1)
- The Shamen (1)
- Feargal Sharkey (1)
- Sandie Shaw (2)
- Ed Sheeran (9)
- Brendan Shine (5)
- Pat Shortt (1)
- Showaddywaddy (1)
- Sia (1)
- Rui da Silva (1)
- Carly Simon (1)
- Eva Simons (1)
- Simple Minds (1)
- Simply Red (2)
- The Simpsons (2)
- Frank Sinatra (2)
- Nancy Sinatra (3)
- Sister Sledge (1)
- Six (2)
- Slade (6)
- Sister Sledge (1)
- Sam Smith (3)
- Will Smith (1)
- Smokie (2)
- DJ Snake (1)
- Snap! (1)
- Snow (1)
- Sombr (2)
- Sonia (1)
- David Soul (2)
- Spandau Ballet (1)
- Britney Spears (8)
- Lauren Spencer-Smith (1)
- Spice Girls (4)
- Spiller (1)
- Spitting Image (1)
- Dusty Springfield (1)
- Bruce Springsteen (2)
- Lisa Stansfield (1)
- Alvin Stardust (1)
- Starship (1)
- Starsound (1)
- Status Quo (3)
- Megan Thee Stallion (1)
- Gwen Stefani (1)
- Steve Harley & Cockney Rebel (1)]
- The Steve Miller Band (1)
- Dave Stewart (1)
- Rod Stewart (4)
- Sting (1)
- The Streets (1)
- Barbra Streisand (2
- Tinchy Stryder (1)
- Harry Styles (2)
- The Stylistics (1)
- Sugababes (1)
- Survivor (1)
- Sutherland Brothers and Quiver (1)
- The Swarbriggs (1)
- Sweet (3)
- Taylor Swift (5)

== T ==
- T.I. (1)
- T-Pain (1)
- T.Rex (5)
- The Tams (1)
- t.A.T.u. (1)
- Take That (4)
- Andre Tannberger (1)
- The Tamperer featuring Maya (1)
- Tiësto (1)
- Tight Fit (1)
- Tim McGraw (1)
- Timbaland (2)
- Tinie Tempah (2)
- Megan Thee Stallion (1)
- Robin Thicke (1)
- Thin Lizzy (2)
- Sandi Thom (1)
- Young Thug (1)
- Tiffany (2)
- Tinchy Stryder (1)
- Tion Wayne (1)
- TLC (1)
- Jim Tobin & The Firehouse (1)
- Tones and I (1)
- The Tornados (1)
- T'Pau (1)
- Train (1)
- Meghan Trainor (2)
- John Travolta (3)
- The Tremeloes (2)
- Eric Turner (1)
- Shania Twain (1)
- Bonnie Tyler (3)
- The Tymes (1)
- Ronan Tynan (1)
- Typically Tropical (1)

== U ==
- U2 (21)
- UB40 (2)
- Tracey Ullman (1)
- Ultravox (1)
- Midge Ure (1)
- Usher (2)

== V ==
- Vanilla Ice (2)
- The Veronicas (1)
- Vika Jigulina (1)
- Village People (1)

== W ==
- Morgan Wallen (1)
- Caitriona Walsh (1)
- The Wanted (1)
- Wanz (1)
- Shayne Ward (3)
- Watch Your House (1)
- The Waterboys (1)
- Marti Webb (1)
- Alex Warren (1)
- The Weeknd (2)
- Florence Welch (1)
- Kanye West (1)
- Westlife (13)
- Wet Wet Wet (3)
- Wham! (5)
- Bill Whelan, Anúna & the RTÉ Concert Orchestra (1)
- Whigfield (1)
- will.i.am (3)
- Pharrell Williams (3)
- Jackie Wilson (1)
- St Winifred's School Choir (1)
- Roger Whittaker (1)
- The Wild Swans (1)
- Robbie Williams (2)
- Wings (3)
- Kate Winslet (1)
- Wizzard (1)
- Wizkid (1)
- The Wolfe Tones (2)
- Stevie Wonder (3)
- Paul Woolford (1)
- Juice Wrld (1)
- Tammy Wynette (1)

== X ==
- Charli XCX (1)
- XTM (1)

== Y ==
- Daddy Yankee (1)
- Yazz & The Plastic Population (2)
- Yolanda Be Cool (1)
- The Young Ones (1)
- Lola Young (1)
- Paul Young (2)
- Will Young (1)

== Z ==
- Zager and Evans (1)
- Zayn (1)
- Zig & Zag (2)
- Zoo (1)

== See also ==
- Irish Singles Chart
- List of songs that reached number one on the Irish Singles Chart
