= Guy Darrell =

- The sleeve of Darrell's "I've Been Hurt" single

Background information
- Born: John Swail; 9 December 1944; Kent, England
- Died: 3 May 2013 (aged 68) Spain
- Years active: 1964–1975
- Labels: Oriole, CBS, Page One, Santa Ponsa, others
- Formerly of: Deep Feeling

John Swail (9 December 1944 – 3 May 2013), better known under his stage name Guy Darrell, was a British singer and musician active in the 1960s and 1970s. His biggest hit, a 1966 cover of the song "I've Been Hurt", reached number 12 on the UK Singles Chart after its reissue in 1973.

== Biography ==
=== Early career ===
Born in Kent, he began his career in the early 1960s singing with Ray McVay's band. Two of his singles with McVay were "Daddy Cool", released in 1961, and "I've Been Hurt" a cover of the hit by Bill Deal And The Rondels, which was released in 1966.

=== Solo career ===
Darrell also recorded "Turn To Me" and "Sing Me No Sad Songs". The latter, a composition by Elton John and Bernie Taupin, was released in 1969 and almost immediately withdrawn. He became front-man for the band Guy Darrell and the Midniters in 1964. Most of his early songs were covers of US originals, such as "Sorry" by The Impalas, "Stupidity" by Solomon Burke, and "Somewhere They Can't Find Me" by Paul Simon. None of them reached the charts, although some received radio play, especially on pirate radio stations.

In 1966, he released "I've Been Hurt" on the CBS label, a 1965 song by Ray Whitley which had already been covered with some success in the US by The Tams. Despite the involvement of Des Champ, this release also failed to reach the UK chart, although it was a top ten hit in South Africa.

During the remainder of the 1960s, Darrell continued to record for various UK record labels. He was able to record, through his connections with Roger Easterby and Des Champ, a version of Elton John's song "Skyline Pigeon" almost a year before the composer's own version was released.

=== Guy Darrell Syndicate/Deep Feeling ===
In 1969, he formed the band Guy Darrell Syndicate with musicians with whom he had been working at BBC radio. The band included: Darrell on vocals; Martin Jenner, guitar and Dave Green, bass/flute (both ex-Summer Set); Derek Elson, keyboards, and Graham Jarvis on drums. Among the band's songs were "Birds Of A Feather", for which composer credit was given to Joe South, and "Keep The Rain From My Door".

After one single release "How Are You?" on Page One Records in October 1969, the Guy Darrell Syndicate morphed into Deep Feeling. At this point, Darrell abandoned the Guy Darrell stage name temporarily and reverted to his given name John Swail; press releases for Deep Feeling made no mention of his previous career as Guy Darrell. While they continued to release 45 RPM cover versions of US songs such as Bobby Freeman's "Do You Want To Dance" and a further version of "Skyline Pigeon", the group (including Swail) also began to compose in their own right. Their range of cover versions began to expand from the musical mainstream toward progressive rock.

In 1971, they released their only album, also titled Deep Feeling, once more produced by Easterby and Champ, released by DJM Records. The album moved yet further toward progressive rock, and though little noted at the time, Deep Feeling has received subsequent critical reassessment and notice, and has been re-released several times up to the present day. Also in 1971, the group composition "Sweat, Dust And Red Wine" was covered by Chicory Tip on their album Son Of My Father.

Throughout the early 1970s, Deep Feeling regularly performed live, playing a mixture of their own material and covers from progressive bands such as Yes and Led Zeppelin in east London and throughout the UK. (Deep Feeling are not to be confused with the short-lived band of the same name, of which Jim Capaldi and Luther Grosvenor were members).

=== "I've Been Hurt" reissue ===
Meantime, the song "I've Been Hurt" had once more been a US hit in 1969 for Bill Deal and the Rhondels, and this version became popular in northern soul clubs such as the Twisted Wheel. Roger Easterby and Des Champ were setting up their own record label, Santa Ponsa Records, and having noted the popularity of the song, made one of the new label's first issues a re-release of Darrell's 1965 recording of it, backed with the original B-side "Blessed" written by Paul Simon. The re-release made its way into the UK Singles Chart, earning Darrell a spot on Top of the Pops (broadcast 20 September 1973) backed by the other members of Deep Feeling. The song reached a chart high of No. 12 for the week ending 29 September 1973.

Following this belated success, Darrell resumed the use of his stage name for recordings, and made several more records with Easterby and Champ for Santa Ponsa; Deep Feeling also released one final single on the same label. For these releases he relinquished progressive rock and reverted to his previous style of covering more mainstream songs. However, no further chart success was forthcoming, and Darrell's final record release came in 1975.

== Personal life ==
In 1967, Darrell married Lyn Webster.

Guy Darrell died of cancer in Spain on 3 May 2013. Darrell died two days before Ray Whiley, who wrote "I've Been Hurt".

== Deep Feeling members ==
This list excludes Darrell.

- Martin Jenner – guitar: Jenner was a guitar player for Eric Clapton, Elton John, Cliff Richard, Elkie Brooks, Barbara Dickson, and Chris Rea, and was a member of Driver 67. He was born in Lindfield on 26 May 1943, and died in Perth, Australia on 7 May 2003.
- David Green – bass: Born in Somerset, Green was also a member of Chicory Tip and Mankind. He died December 13, 2011.
- Derek Elson – keyboards: The only living member of Deep Feeling, he is now a church organist.
- Graham Jarvis – drums: Jarvis also played drums as a session musician for BA Robertson, Claudja Barry, and Camel, and was a member of the band Mankind. He died in December 1985.

== Albums ==
=== Deep Feeling dlbums ===
Year	Month	Label	Title	Track list
1971	November	DJM	Deep Feeling	1. Welcome For A Soldier; 2. Old People's Home; 3. Classical Gas; 4. Guillotine; 5. Country Heir; 6. Lucille

=== Guy Darrell albums ===
Year	Label	Title	Track list
1973	CBS	I've Been Hurt	1. I've Been Hurt; 2. At The Club; 3. Drift Away; 4. Medley: Rip It Up/Great Balls Of Fire/Shake Rattle And Roll; 5. Hard Road; 6. At The Hop; 7. I Put A Spell On You; 8. Fannie Mae; 9. Papa's Got A Brand New Bag/I Feel Good

== Singles ==
=== Guy Darrell and the Midniters singles ===
Year	Label	A-side	B-side
1964	Oriole	"Go Home Girl"	"You Won't Come Home"
1964	Oriole	"Sorry"	"Sweet Dreams"

=== Guy Darrell and Wind of Change singles ===
Year	Label	A-side	B-side
1965	CBS	"Stupidity"	"One of These Days"

=== Guy Darrell singles ===
Year	Label	A-side	B-side	Charts	Notes
Year	Label	A-side	B-side	UK	Notes
1966	CBS	"Somewhere They Can't Find Me"	"It Takes a Lot to Laugh, It Takes a Train to Cry"		
1966	CBS	"I've Been Hurt"	"Blessed"		
1966	CBS	"My Way of Thinking"	"Big Louie"		
1967	CBS	"Hard Lovin'"	"I've Never Had a Love Like That"		
1967	CBS	"Crystal Ball"	"Didn't I"		
1967	Piccadilly	"Evil Woman"	"What Do You Do About That"		
1967	Pye	"Cupid"	"What's Happened to Our Love"		
1968	Pye	"Skyline Pigeon"	"Everything"		
1969	Page One	"Turn to Me"	"What's Her Name"		
1969	Page One	"Birds of a Feather"	"Keep the Rain from My Door"		
1973	Santa Ponsa	"I've Been Hurt"	"Blessed"	12	Reissue of 1966 CBS single
1974	Santa Ponsa	"Hard Road"	"We've Thrown It All Away		
1974	Santa Ponsa	"Suzie"	"What's Her Name"		
1974	Santa Ponsa	"You're Ready Now"	"Turn to Me"		
1974	Santa Ponsa	"The Shape I'm In"	"Right Here on Earth"		
1975	Route	"Hard Lovin'"	"We've Thrown It All Away"		

=== Guy Darrell Syndicate singles ===
Year	Label	A-side	B-side
1969	Page One	"How Are You?"	"The Turtle Tortoise & the Hare"

=== Deep Feeling singles ===
Year	Label	A-side	B-side
1970	Page One	"Do You Love Me"	"Move On"
1970	Page One	"Skyline Pigeon"	"We've Thrown It All Away"
1970	DJM	"Do You Wanna Dance"	"The Day My Lady Cried"
1971	DJM	"Sweat, Dust and Red Wine"	"Turn Around"
1971	DJM	"Country Heir"	"We've Thrown It All Away"
1972	Philips	"Sunday Morning Leaving"	"Why Lady Why?"
1974	Santa Ponsa	"Let's Spend the Night Together"	"Avalon"
