= List of number-one singles of 1971 (Ireland) =

This is a list of singles which topped the Irish Singles Chart in 1971.

Note that prior to 1992, the Irish singles chart was compiled from trade shipments from the labels to record stores, rather than on consumer sales. The chart date moved from Friday to Saturday in late January, and then to Thursday in early August.

Issue date	Song	Artist	Ref.
1 January	"If Those Lips Could Only Speak"	Dermot Henry	
8 January	"If Those Lips Could Only Speak"	Dermot Henry	
15 January	"If Those Lips Could Only Speak"	Dermot Henry	
23 January	"If Those Lips Could Only Speak"	Dermot Henry	
30 January	"My Sweet Lord"	George Harrison	
6 February	"My Sweet Lord"	George Harrison	
13 February	"My Sweet Lord"	George Harrison	
20 February	"My Sweet Lord"	George Harrison	
27 February	"My Sweet Lord"	George Harrison	
6 March	"My Sweet Lord"	George Harrison	
13 March	"My Sweet Lord"	George Harrison	
20 March	"Another Day"	Paul McCartney	
27 March	"Rose Garden"	Lynn Anderson	
3 April	"Hot Love"	T. Rex	
10 April	"When We Were Young"	Pat Lynch	
17 April	"Rose Garden"	Lynn Anderson	
24 April	"Rose Garden"	Lynn Anderson	
1 May	"Hot Love"	T. Rex	
8 May	"When We Were Young"	Pat Lynch	
15 May	"When We Were Young"	Pat Lynch	
22 May	"When We Were Young"	Pat Lynch	
29 May	"When We Were Young"	Pat Lynch	
5 June	"I Am... I Said"	Neil Diamond	
12 June	"I Am... I Said"	Neil Diamond	
19 June	"O'Brien Has No Place to Go"	Brendan Shine	
26 June	"O'Brien Has No Place to Go"	Brendan Shine	
3 July	"O'Brien Has No Place to Go"	Brendan Shine	
10 July	"Chirpy Chirpy Cheep Cheep"	Middle of the Road	
17 July	"Chirpy Chirpy Cheep Cheep"	Middle of the Road	
24 July	"Chirpy Chirpy Cheep Cheep"	Middle of the Road	
31 July	"Sometimes"	Red Hurley	
5 August	"Sometimes"	Red Hurley	
12 August	"Get It On"	T. Rex	
19 August	"Get It On"	T. Rex	
26 August	"Never Ending Song of Love"	The New Seekers	
2 September	"Never Ending Song of Love"	The New Seekers	
9 September	"Never Ending Song of Love"	The New Seekers	
16 September	"I'm Still Waiting"	Diana Ross	
23 September	"What Are You Doing Sunday"	Dawn	
30 September	"Hey Girl Don't Bother Me"	The Tams	
7 October	"Did You Ever"	Nancy and Lee	
14 October	"Did You Ever"	Nancy and Lee	
21 October	"Did You Ever"	Nancy and Lee	
28 October	"Did You Ever"	Nancy and Lee	
4 November	"Did You Ever"	Nancy and Lee	
11 November	"Did You Ever"	Nancy and Lee	
18 November	"Kiss Me Goodbye"	Red Hurley	
25 November	"Coz I Luv You"	Slade	
2 December	"Kiss Me Goodbye"	Red Hurley	
9 December	"I Don't Know How to Love Him"	Tina & The Real McCoy	
16 December	"I Don't Know How to Love Him"	Tina & The Real McCoy	
23 December	"O Holy Night"	Tommy Drennan and the Monarchs	
30 December	"O Holy Night"	Tommy Drennan and the Monarchs	

== See also ==
- 1971 in music
- Irish Singles Chart
- List of artists who reached number one in Ireland
