= Danny (Finnish singer) =

Finnish singer

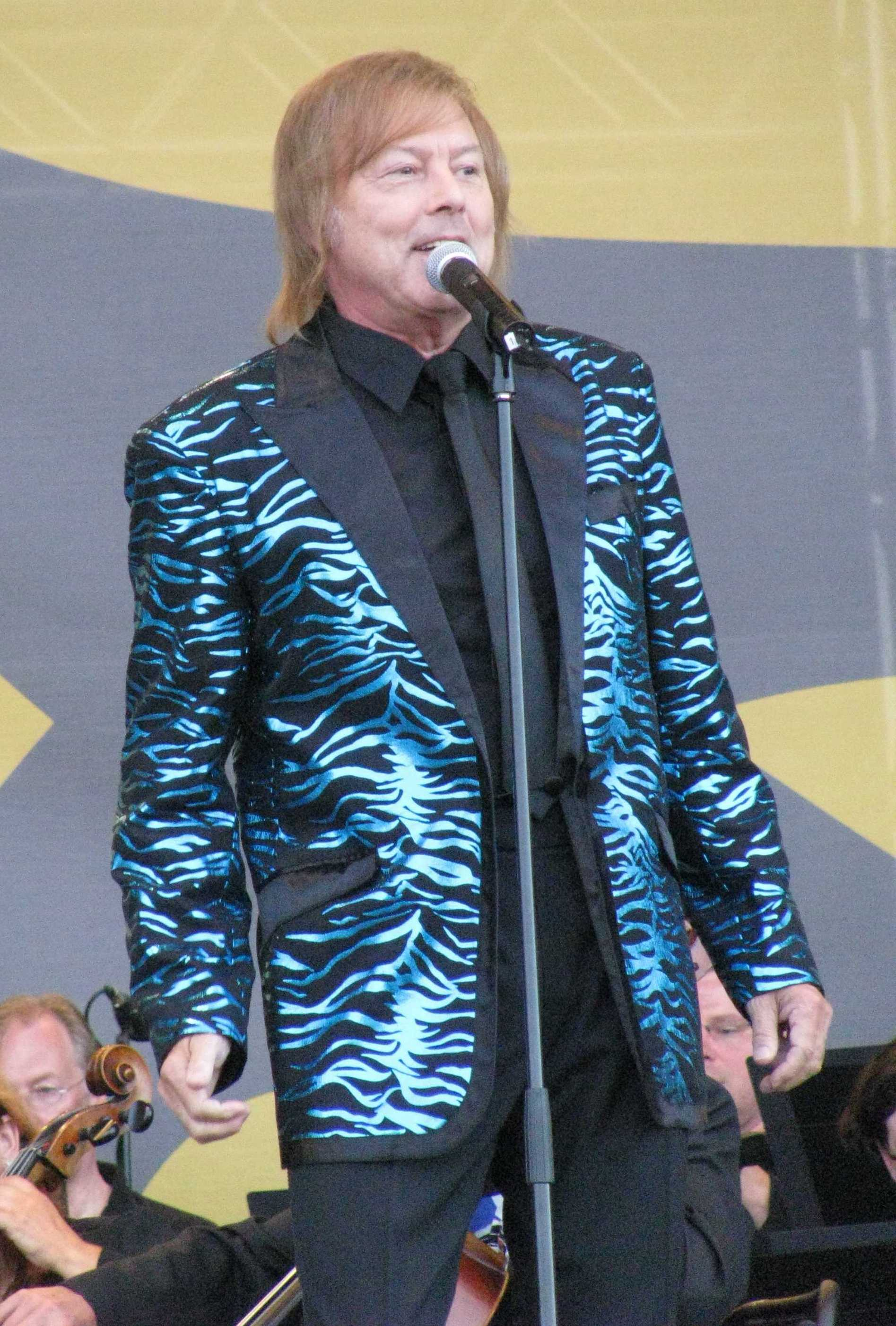
- Danny in 2008

Background information
- Born: Ilkka Johannes Lipsanen; 24 September 1942 (age 83); Pori, Finland
- Origin: Helsinki, Finland
- Genres: Schlager
- Occupations: Singer, guitarist
- Years active: 1966–present
- Labels: Fazer, Finndisc, Edel
- Website: www.danny.fi

Ilkka Johannes Lipsanen (born 24 September 1942), commonly known by his stage name Danny, is a Finnish singer and guitarist.

Still active, Danny's singing career is one of the longest in Finland, spanning over more than 50 years. He has recorded many evergreen hit songs.

He achieved some notoriety outside Finland in 2006 when the music video for his 1978 duet with the late Armi Aavikko, "Tahdon olla sulle hellä", sung in English as "I Wanna Love You Tender", became an internet meme. Designed as a loose parody of the hit film Grease, the video's choreography was apparently intended to be "erotic and tantalizing" but in the eyes of many it principally succeeded in being hilarious.

== Career ==
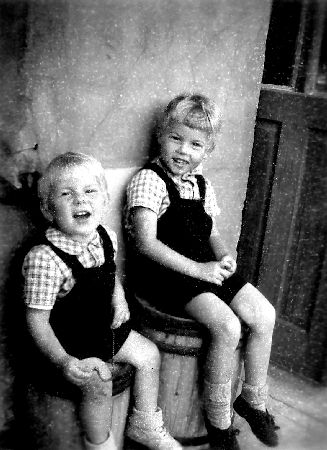
Ilkka (right) and his younger brother Pekka as children.

Danny was born in Pori. He started his career with the band Islanders who released a couple of singles, among them Danny's first recording which was in English: East Virginia by Joan Baez in 1964. During his national service Danny switched to his native Finnish and recorded two hits, "Kauan" ("Downtown" by Petula Clark) and "Piilopaikka" ("You've Got Your Troubles," originally by The Fortunes).

After the army in 1966 Danny launched his own management company, D-Tuotanto, and started his hugely popular and spectacular "Danny Shows" which toured around Finland every summer all the way to the late 1970s. During the 1960s, he recorded a number of hits, among them "Kesäkatu" (Loving Spoonful's "Summer in the City"), "Vähän ennen kyyneleitä" ("El angel de la guarda"), "Tuuliviiri", "Rebecca" and "Se eikö todista että muutuin" ("If I Promise"). In 1968 Danny appeared in Spede Pasanen's film comedy Noin seitsemän veljestä as a medieval troubadour and performed his song "Seitsemän kertaa seitsemän" which became another hit.

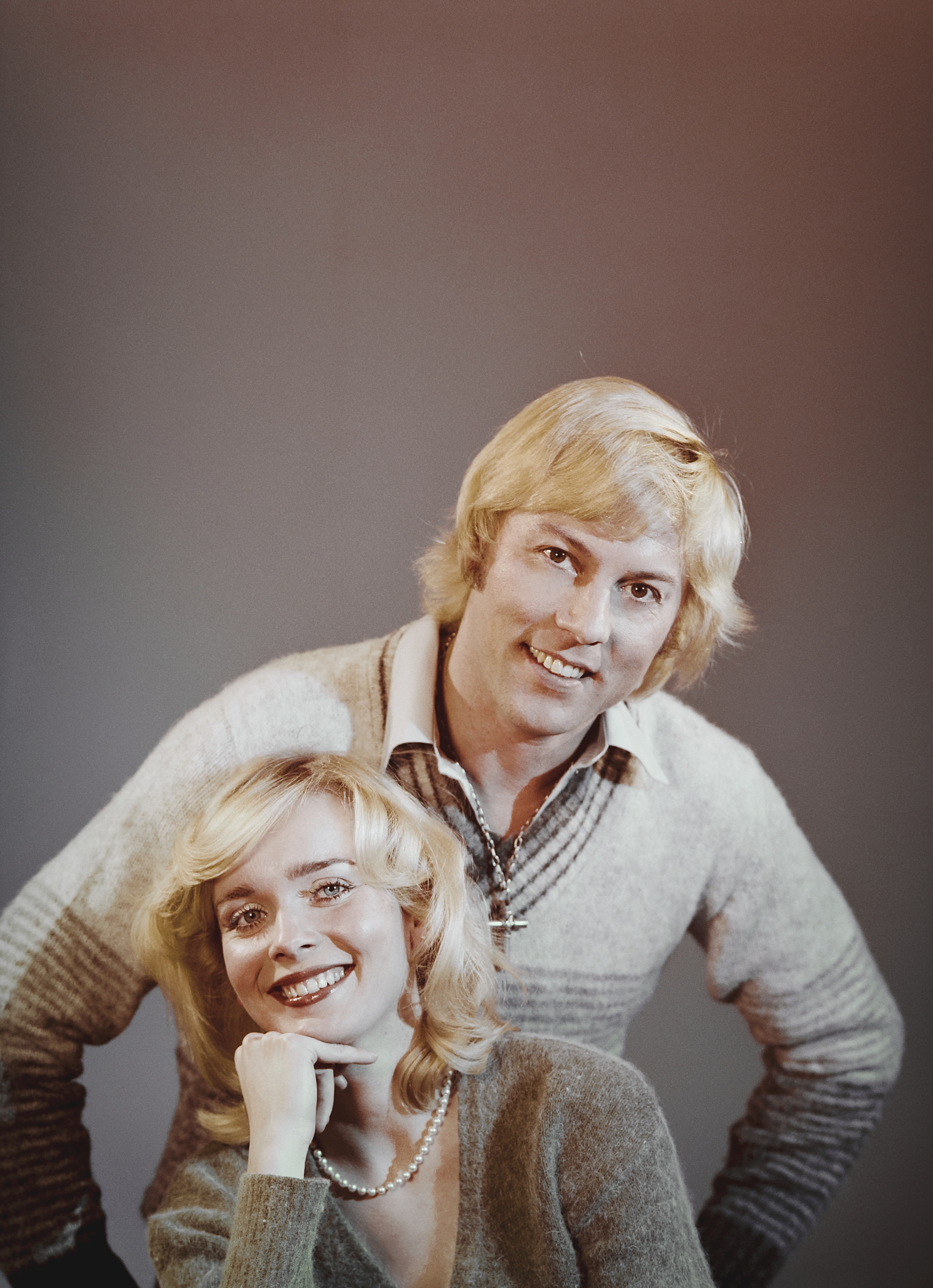
Armi Aavikko and Danny in 1979.

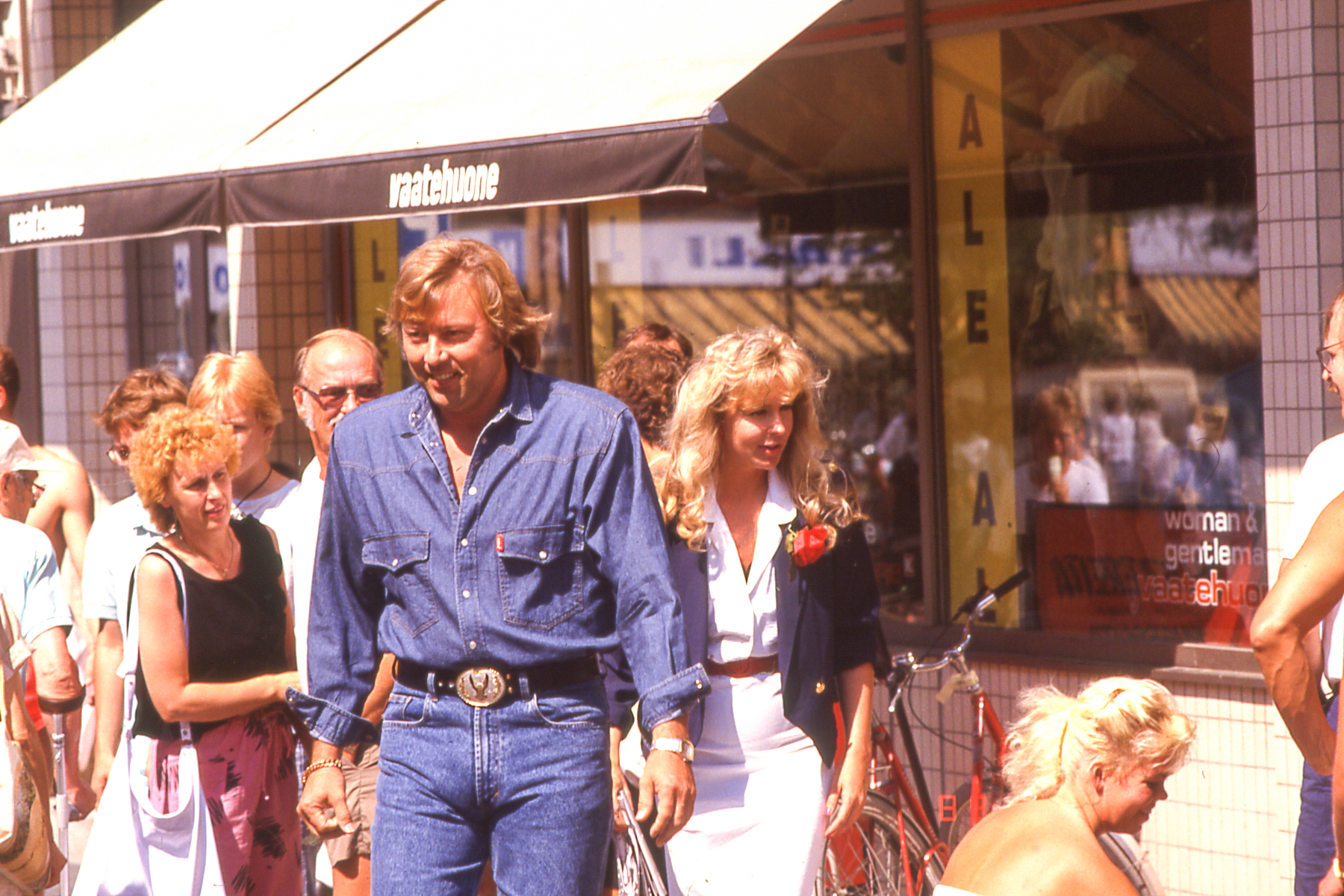
Danny and Armi in Heinola on 8 July 1989

Some of the best known hits for Danny in the 1970s were "Vai niin, vai niin" ("How Do You Do"), "Maantieltä taloon" ("Son of My Father" by Chicory Tip) and "Kuusamo" ("L'ete Indien – Africa" performed also by Joe Dassin) in reality Danny´s "Kuusamo" is exactly based on the version recorded by Frank Farian, a version which Farian recorded using an alias-name "Exodus" as the artist name and produced the version by using an alias-name "Monfa" as the producer, the first and original version of the song is recorded by the band named "Albatros", where Toto Cutugno was the Lead singer. In 1977 Danny joined together with former Miss Finland, Armi Aavikko, with whom he had the extremely popular hits "Tahdon olla sulle hellä" and "Kaiken sulle antaisin".

A song by Jukka Kuoppamäki, "Tämä taivas, tämä maa", was a big hit for Danny in 1992. In 1997 performed in China and in 1988 in Turkey.

Danny and his band have a small cameo appearance in the 2013 British black comedy film The Double.

== Efforts for Eurovision ==
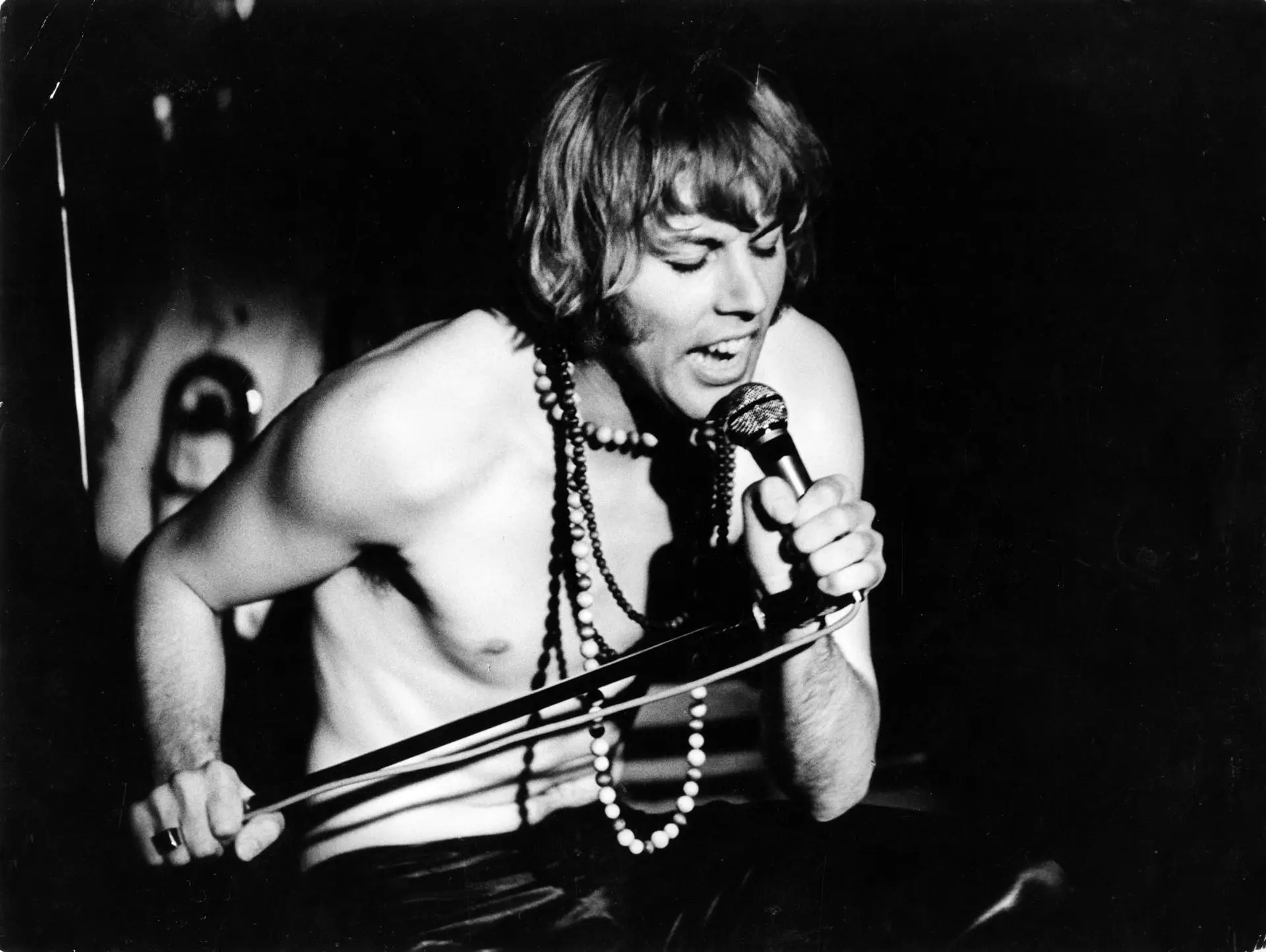
Danny performing in 1969.

Danny has applied for the Eurovision Song Contest eight times in different eras.

| Title | Year |
|---|---|
| "Pieni sana" | 1966 |
| "Sua kutsun, Maarit" "Keskiyöllä" | 1967 |
| "Galileo Galilei" | 1973 |
| "Jos maailmassa vain ois kahva" | 1974 |
| "Seikkailija" | 1975 |
| "Ninja" | 1986 |
| "Seven Times Seven" | 2004 |
| "Sinä päivänä kun kaikki rakastaa mua" | 2021 |

== Personal life ==
From 2016 until 2020, Danny was in a relationship with Finnish singer Erika Vikman. The relationship was controversial due to their age gap, with Danny being 50 years older than Vikman. They resided together in Kirkkonummi until their separation.
