= Ray Whitley (songwriter) =

American singer-songwriter

- Birth name: Robert Ray Whitley
- Born: November 22, 1943; Columbus, Georgia, United States
- Died: May 5, 2013 (aged 69); Gainesville, Georgia, United States
- Occupations: Singer, Songwriter, Composer, Producer, Arranger, Performer
- Years active: 1961-1970
- Labels: Vee Jay, Dunhill, Apt, Columbia, TRX, 123, Attarack, others
- Website: raywhitley.wordpress.com

Robert Ray Whitley (November 22, 1943 – May 5, 2013) was an American beach music composer and singer-songwriter. He was best known for composing hit songs recorded by The Tams and Guy Darrell, and he also released 14 of his own singles between 1961 and 1970.

== Biography ==
Whitely was born in Columbus, Georgia on November 22, 1943 to Robert S. and Willie Bell Whitley. Whitley was 14 when he formed his first band in his hometown. Producer Felton Jarvis soon discovered him in an Atlanta High School. Jarvis introduced Whitley to Atlanta music producer Bill Lowery, who saw Whitley's potential and signed him to a contract.

Whitley's songwriting credits include "What Kind of Fool (Do You Think I Am)" (which reached #9 on the Billboard charts), "I've Been Hurt", "Hey Girl, Don't Bother Me", "You Lied to Your Daddy", and "Be Young, Be Foolish, Be Happy" (co-written with J.R. Cobb of the Atlanta Rhythm Section) for The Tams. His compositions were also recorded by Billy Joe Royal, Tommy Roe, Guy Darrell, The Swinging Medallions, Bill Deal and the Rhondels, Mylon LeFevre and Sonia Evans.

Whitley toured nationally as a singer and performer, in addition to his work as a songwriter. He was inducted into the Georgia Music Hall of Fame in 1991.

Later in his life, Whitley struggled with alcoholism and homelessness; as of 2011, he was living in a shelter in Gainesville, Georgia. Whitley died on May 5, 2013, after several months of illness.

== Discography as a recording artist ==
- 1961 - I Wasn't Sure / There Goes A Teardrop - Vee Jay USA VJ 414
- 1962 - Yessiree-Yessiree / A Love We Can Have And Hold - Vee Jay USA VJ 433
- 1962 - It Hurts / Deeper In Love - Vee Jay USA VJ 448
- 1963 - Teenage Crush / Young Heartaches - Vee Jay USA VJ 521
- 1964 - Walking Back To You / Weep Little Girl Weep - Vee Jay USA VJ 591
- 1965 - I've Been Hurt / There Is One Boy - Dunhill USA D-201
- 1965 - Runaway / I'll Tell The Robin - Apt USA 45-25086
- 1966 - The End Of My World / Just A Boy In Love - Columbia USA 4-43607
- 1967 - Take Back Your Mind / Here Today, Gone Tomorrow - Columbia USA 4-43980
- 1968 - 1983 / Gotta Go There - TRX USA 45-T-5007
- 1969 - Don't Throw Your Love To The Wind / Underdose Of Faith - 123 USA 1707
- 1970 - Hey Girl, Don't Bother Me / Everybody - Attarack USA ATT 103

== Selected songs written by Ray Whitley ==
Date	Performer	Title	Peak chart positions					Notes
Date	Performer	Title	US	US AC	US Country	US R&B	UK	Notes
12/1963	The Tams	What Kind of Fool (Do You Think I Am)	9			1		ABC-Paramount 10502.
03/1964	The Tams	You Lied to Your Daddy	70			27		ABC-Paramount 10533.
07/1964	The Tams	Hey Girl, Don't Bother Me	41			10		ABC-Paramount 10573.
10/1966	Bryan Hyland	Run, Run, Look, and See	25					Philips 40405. Written by Martin Cooper & Ray Whitley.
04/1967	The Swingin' Medallions	I Found a Rainbow	107					Smash 2084.
05/1968	December's Children	Backwards and Forwards	123					World Pacific 77887.
09/1968	The Tams	Trouble Maker	118					ABC 11128.
04/1969	Bill Deal & the Rhondels	I've Been Hurt	35					Heritage 812.
08/1969	Bill Deal & the Rhondels	What Kind of Fool Do You Think I Am	23					Heritage 817.
07/1971	The Tams	Hey Girl Don't Bother Me					1	
08/1973	Guy Darrell	I've Been Hurt					12	
1976	Larry Jon Wilson	Think I Feel a Hitchhike Coming On		47	74			Monument 8692.
1978	Eddie Middleton	What Kind of Fool (Do You Think I Am)			44			
08/1991	Sonia Evans	Be Young Be Foolish Be Happy		13			22	I.Q./RCA 62246. Written by James Cobb & Ray Whitley.
