= I've Been Hurt =

Song performed by the Tams

"I've Been Hurt" is a popular single by the Tams, Guy Darrell, and Bill Deal and the Rhondels. Written by Ray Whitley, it was originally released in 1965.

== The Tams version ==
"I've Been Hurt"

Single by The Tams

from the album Time for the Tams
- B-side: "Carryin' On"
- Released: October 1965
- Genre: R&B, soul
- Label: ABC
- Songwriter: Ray Whitley

The Tams singles chronology
"Concrete Jungle" (1965)	"I've Been Hurt" (1965)	"Untie Me" (1965)

"I've Been Hurt" appeared in the Hit Bulletin section of Cash Box (October 30, 1965 issue). In January, 1967 the version by The Tams had been released on ABC 10741. It was produced by Joe South. Billboard marked it as a Top 60 prediction in the January 28 issue. It became their biggest regional hit.

== Guy Darrell version ==
"I've Been Hurt"

Single by Guy Darrell
- A-side: "I've Been Hurt"
- B-side: "Blessed"
- Released: June 1966, re-released, 1973
- Label: CBS 202082
- Composer: Ray Whitley
- Producer: Irving Martin

Darrell's cover was backed with "Blessed". It was produced by Irving Martin with Des Champ handling the arrangements. It was released in June 1966. It managed to chart in South Africa and spent nine weeks on the charts there. It became a favourite on the Northern soul scene in the UK, belatedly reaching number 12 on the UK Singles Chart in August 1973.

== Bill Deal and the Rhondels version ==
"I've Been Hurt"

Single by Bill Deal and the Rhondels
- B-side: "I've Got My Needs"
- Released: 1969
- Genre: Bubblegum pop, southern soul
- Label: Heritage
- Songwriter: Ray Whitley
- Producer: Jerry Ross

Bill Deal and the Rhondels singles chronology
"What Kind Of Fool Do You Think I Am" (1969)	"I've Been Hurt" (1969)	"Nothing Succeeds Like Success" (1969)

For the week ending April 19, 1969, the version by Bill Deal and the Rhondels entered the Billboard Hot 100 at no. 89. It peaked at no. 35.

== Charts ==
Chart (1969–1970)	Peak position
Argentina (CAPIF)	1
Australia (Kent Music Report)	81

== Other versions ==
=== The Sensational Epics ===
The Sensational Epics were part of the same roster as The Tams, handled by Bill Lowery Talent Inc. They recorded a version. Backed with "It's a Gas", and released on Cameo 450. It was reported by Record World in the December 31, 1966 issue that the record was breaking big through the South. It was a Four Star pick in the January 14, 1967 issue of Record World. It was reported by Record World in the February 18 issue that the song was doing well in Richmond.

In 1969, "I've Been Hurt" was recorded in portuguese as "Agora eu sei" by the brazilian pop group "The Fevers" and an instrumental version was released in Chile by the funk group "Los Minimás".
