= List of number-one singles of 1979 (Ireland) =

This is a list of singles which have reached number one on the Irish Singles Chart in 1979.

Week ending	Song	Artist	Ref.
6 January	"Mary's Boy Child / Oh My Lord"	Boney M	
13 January	"Y.M.C.A."	Village People	
20 January	"Y.M.C.A."	Village People	
27 January	"Y.M.C.A."	Village People	
3 February	"Y.M.C.A."	Village People	
10 February	"Chiquitita"	ABBA	
17 February	"Chiquitita"	ABBA	
24 February	"Chiquitita"	ABBA	
3 March	"Tragedy"	The Bee Gees	
10 March	"Tragedy"	The Bee Gees	
17 March	"I Will Survive"	Gloria Gaynor	
24 March	"I Will Survive"	Gloria Gaynor	
31 March	"I Will Survive"	Gloria Gaynor	
7 April	"I Will Survive"	Gloria Gaynor	
14 April	"Bright Eyes"	Art Garfunkel	
21 April	"Bright Eyes"	Art Garfunkel	
28 April	"Bright Eyes"	Art Garfunkel	
5 May	"Hallelujah"	Milk and Honey	
12 May	"Bright Eyes"	Art Garfunkel	
19 May	"Bright Eyes"	Art Garfunkel	
26 May	"Sunday Girl"	Blondie	
2 June	"Sunday Girl"	Blondie	
9 June	"Sunday Girl"	Blondie	
16 June	"Sunday Girl"	Blondie	
23 June	"Dance Away"	Roxy Music	
30 June	"Do You Want Your Old Lobby Washed Down, Con Shine"	Brendan Shine	
7 July	"Do You Want Your Old Lobby Washed Down, Con Shine"	Brendan Shine	
14 July	"Do You Want Your Old Lobby Washed Down, Con Shine"	Brendan Shine	
21 July	"Do You Want Your Old Lobby Washed Down, Con Shine"	Brendan Shine	
28 July	"Green Fields Of France"	The Fureys and Davey Arthur	
4 August	"I Don't Like Mondays"	The Boomtown Rats	
11 August	"I Don't Like Mondays"	The Boomtown Rats	
18 August	"I Don't Like Mondays"	The Boomtown Rats	
25 August	"I Don't Like Mondays"	The Boomtown Rats	
1 September	"We Don't Talk Anymore"	Cliff Richard	
8 September	"We Don't Talk Anymore"	Cliff Richard	
15 September	"We Don't Talk Anymore"	Cliff Richard	
22 September	"We Don't Talk Anymore"	Cliff Richard	
29 September	"Viva IL Papa"	Caitriona Walsh	
6 October	"Welcome John Paul II"	Jim Tobin	
13 October	"Welcome John Paul II"	Jim Tobin	
20 October	"Message in a Bottle"	The Police	
27 October	"Video Killed the Radio Star"	The Buggles	
3 November	"Video Killed the Radio Star"	The Buggles	
10 November	"Gimme! Gimme! Gimme! (A Man After Midnight)"	ABBA	
17 November	"When You're in Love with a Beautiful Woman"	Dr. Hook	
24 November	"When You're in Love with a Beautiful Woman"	Dr. Hook	
1 December	"When You're in Love with a Beautiful Woman"	Dr. Hook	
8 December	"Walking on the Moon"	The Police	
15 December	"Another Brick in the Wall (Part 2)"	Pink Floyd	
22 December	"Another Brick in the Wall (Part 2)"	Pink Floyd	
29 December	"Another Brick in the Wall (Part 2)"	Pink Floyd	

- 21 Number Ones
- Most weeks at No.1 (song): "Bright Eyes" - Art Garfunkel
- Most weeks at No.1 (artist): Art Garfunkel
- Most No.1s: Abba (2), The Police (2)
- Two songs about the visit by Pope John Paul II to Ireland reached No. 1

== See also ==
- 1979 in music
- Irish Singles Chart
- List of artists who reached number one in Ireland
