= Sorry (I Ran All the Way Home) =

Single by The Impalas

from the album Sorry (I Ran All the Way Home)
- B-side: "Fool, Fool, Fool"
- Released: January 1959
- Genre: Doo-wop
- Length: 2:33
- Label: Cub
- Songwriter(s): Artie Zwirn, Harry Giosasi
- Producer(s): LeRoy Holmes

The Impalas singles chronology
"Sorry (I Ran All the Way Home)" (1959)	"Oh, What a Fool" (1959)

"Sorry (I Ran All the Way Home)" is a song written by Artie Zwirn and Harry Giosasi and produced and arranged by LeRoy Holmes. The single was performed by New York-based doo-wop group The Impalas. It reached #2 on the U.S. pop chart, behind both The Happy Organ by Dave "Baby" Cortez and Kansas City by Wilbert Harrison. It also went to #14 on the U.S. R&B chart. Overseas, "Sorry (I Ran All the Way Home)" went to #28 on the UK Singles Chart in 1959. The song was featured on The Impalas' 1959 album, Sorry (I Ran All the Way Home).

The song ranked #24 on Billboard's Year-End top 100 singles of 1959.

== Other versions ==
- Guy Darrell and The Midniters, as a single in 1964, but it did not chart.
- Heinz, on his 1964 album, Tribute to Eddie.
- The Royal Showband Waterford, as the B-side to their 1964 single "Huckle Buck".
- Phil Orsi and The Little Kings, as a single in 1966, but it did not chart.
