= Son of My Father =

Single by Chicory Tip

from the album Son of My Father
- B-side: "Pride Comes Before a Fall"
- Released: 14 January 1972 (UK); 9 February 1972 (US)
- Recorded: 24 December 1971
- Studio: Air Studios, London
- Genre: Glam rock; electronic
- Length: 3:20
- Label: CBS
- Songwriters: Giorgio Moroder; Pete Bellotte; Michael Holm
- Producers: Roger Easterby; Des Champ

Chicory Tip singles chronology
"I Love Onions" (1971)	"Son of My Father" (1972)	"What's Your Name" (1972)

"Son of My Father" is a song popularised in 1972 by Chicory Tip.

The song was originally published in German as "Nachts scheint die Sonne" (In the Night Shines the Sun), written by Giorgio Moroder with German lyrics by Michael Holm in 1971, and English lyrics by Pete Bellotte. The German version "Nachts scheint die Sonne" recorded by Michael Holm was released in 1971, while Giorgio Moroder also released the English version "Son of My Father" under the moniker Giorgio. However, Giorgio's version failed to chart in the UK. The song was released by Chicory Tip in 1972 and this version reached No. 1 on the UK single chart in February 1972.

Since its release, the tune of the chorus of "Son of My Father" has been regularly used on the terraces of British football grounds for football chants.

== Chicory Tip's version ==
A copy of Giorgio's version found its way to studio manager Roger Easterby who then persuaded the British band Chicory Tip to record it. The song, produced by Easterby and Des Champ, was recorded on Christmas Eve 1971 in the studio of George Martin. The song is notable as the first UK number one single to prominently feature a synthesizer, in this case a Moog synthesizer, programmed by Chris Thomas. The B side of the single is "Pride Comes Before A Fall". The song reached No. 1 on the UK Singles Chart for three weeks in February 1972. The band released the song in the US under the shortened name Chicory, but it only reached No. 91 on the Billboard Hot 100.

The Chicory Tip version includes audibly different lyrics to those written by Bellotte and recorded by Moroder, although it is unclear why, but it may be down to misheard lyrics on the part of vocalist Peter Hewson. The band re-recorded the song in 2000 (with Rick Foster on vocals), this time with the correct lyrics as sung by Moroder.

=== Charts ===
==== Weekly charts ====
Chart (1972)	Peak position
Argentina (Escalera a la fama)	1
Australia (Go-Set)	12
Australia (Kent Music Report)	19
Belgium (Ultratop 50 Flanders)	1
Belgium (Ultratop 50 Wallonia)	1
France (IFOP)	50
Germany (GfK)	18
Ireland (IRMA)	3
Netherlands (Dutch Top 40)	4
Netherlands (Single Top 100)	4
New Zealand (Listener)	1
Norway (VG-lista)	4
Spain (AFYVE)	1
South Africa (Springbok Radio)	1
UK Singles (Official Charts)	1
US Billboard Hot 100	91
US Cash Box Top 100	82

==== Year-end charts ====
Chart (1972)	Peak position
Belgium (Ultratop Flanders)	15
Netherlands (Dutch Top 40)	40
Netherlands (Single Top 100)	35
South Africa (Springbok Radio)	19
UK Singles (Official Charts Company)	9

== Giorgio Moroder's version ==
Moroder's original version, recorded before Chicory Tip's version, was first released in Germany in 1971 under the name Giorgio as the B-side of "I'm Free Now", and later released as an 'A'-side single in 1972. It reached No. 47 in Germany in 1972. The song however failed to chart on its release in the UK. In the US, the song peaked at No. 34 for two weeks on the US Cashbox pop charts, and slightly lower at No. 46 on Billboard Hot 100 in April 1972, but performing better than Chicory Tip's version which was released in the US around the same time.

In Chicago, WLS playlisted only Giorgio's version, for about a month, peaking at No. 23 on 27 March 1972, whereas rival WCFL charted only Chicory Tip's version (as by Chicory), for about 2 1/2 months, peaking at No. 9 on 20 April 1972.

=== Charts ===
Chart (1972)	Peak position
US Billboard Hot 100	46
US Cash Box Top 100	34
West Germany (GfK)	47

== Other versions ==
The German version, "Nachts scheint die Sonne", was recorded with Michael Holm on vocals. The song was released in 1971 and this reached No. 29 in September 1971 in Germany. The next year, Finnish musician Danny recorded a Finnish-language version, "Maantieltä taloon" (From the road to the house), released as the B side to "Vai niin, vai niin" (Finnish version of Mouth & MacNeal's "How Do You Do").

== In popular culture ==
The tune of the chorus of "Son of My Father" has been used on the terraces of British football grounds for football chants, for example 'Oh, Orry Orry, Orry Orry Orry Orry Orient' for Leyton Orient F.C. and the anthem for Teddy Sheringham that started with "Oh Teddy, Teddy ...".

The tune has also been popular at cricket grounds, notably with fans of Lancashire County Cricket Club in England - "Oh, Lanky Lanky, Lanky Lanky Lanky Lanky Lancashire!". It has also been adapted to the name of professional darts player Gary Anderson.
