= What Kind of Fool (Do You Think I Am) =

1963 single by The Tams

Single by the Tams

from the album Presenting The Tams
- B-side: "Laugh It Off"
- Released: 1963
- Recorded: 1963
- Genre: Southern soul; R&B; pop
- Length: 2:00
- Label: ABC-Paramount
- Songwriter: Ray Whitley

The Tams singles chronology
"Silly Little Girl" (1964)	"What Kind of Fool (Do You Think I Am)" (1963)	"It's All Right (You're Just In Love)" (1964)

"What Kind of Fool (Do You Think I Am)"

Single by Bill Deal and the Rhondels

from the album The Best of Bill Deal & The Rhondels
- B-side: "Are You Ready For This?"
- Released: 1969
- Recorded: 1968
- Genre: Bubblegum pop, southern soul
- Length: 2:13
- Label: Heritage
- Songwriter: Ray Whitley
- Producer: Jerry Ross

Bill Deal and the Rhondels singles chronology
"May I" (1968)	"What Kind of Fool (Do You Think I Am)" (1969)	"I've Been Hurt" (1969)

"What Kind of Fool (Do You Think I Am)" is a 1964 single written by Ray Whitley and recorded by the Tams.

== Background ==
This track was one of the many hit records recorded at Rick Hall's FAME Studios in Muscle Shoals, Alabama. Musicians on this track included Norbert Putnam on bass, Jerry Carrigan on drums, David Briggs on piano, Terry Thompson and Earl "Peanut" Montgomery on guitar, and Jill Shires on flute.

== Chart performance ==
The single was the group's most successful release on both the United States R&B and pop charts. "What Kind of Fool (Do You Think I Am)" went to number one on the Cash Box R&B chart and peaked at number nine on the Billboard Hot 100.

== Cover versions ==
- The song was covered by Bill Deal and the Rhondels in 1969, and peaked at number 23 on the Billboard Hot 100.
- Del Shannon covered this song on his posthumously-released album Rock On!
