= Armi Aavikko =

Finnish beauty queen and singer

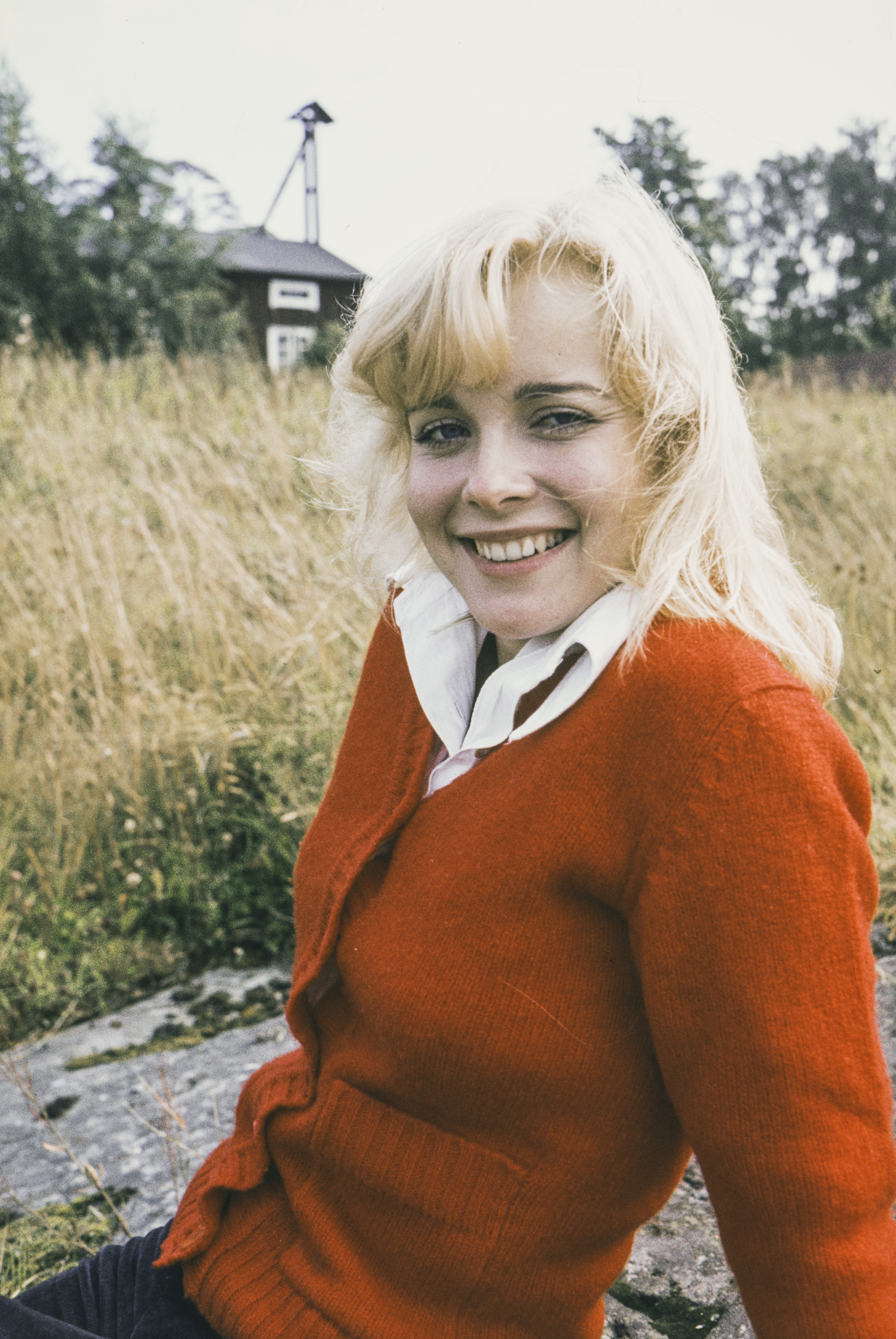
- Armi Aavikko in Heinola, Finland on 8 July 1989
- Born: 1 September 1958; Helsinki, Finland
- Died: 2 January 2002 (aged 43); Espoo, Finland
- Beauty pageant titleholder
- Title: Miss Finland 1977
- Hair color: Blonde
- Major competitions: Miss Finland 1977 (Winner); Miss Universe 1977 (Unplaced)

Armi Anja Orvokki Aavikko (1 September 1958 – 2 January 2002) was a Finnish singer and beauty pageant titleholder. She was chosen as Miss Finland in 1977 and was best known for her duets with singer Danny.

Born in Helsinki, towards the end of her life, Aavikko struggled with alcoholism and depression. She died in Espoo on 2 January 2002 from pneumonia, at the age of 43. She was buried in the Malmi Cemetery.

Aavikko achieved some posthumous camp notoriety in 2006 when the Armi & Danny video "I Wanna Love You Tender," featuring Armi as Sandy Olsson from Grease and surrounded by backing dancers in Rydell High cheerleader uniforms with incomprehensible choreography, became an Internet phenomenon.

== Discography ==
- Danny & Armi (with Danny) (1978)
- Toinen LP (with Danny) (1979)
- Armi (1981)
- Armi ja lemmikit (1993)
- Armi Aavikko (2002)
