= Swingin' Tight =

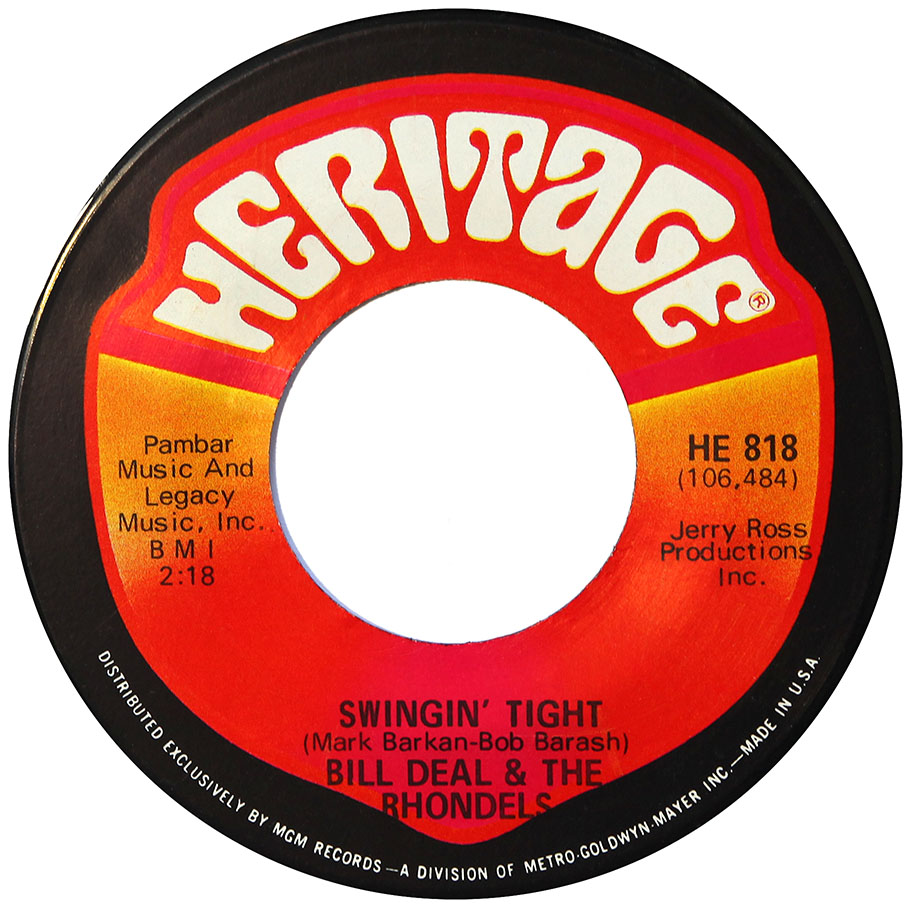

Single by Bill Deal and the Rhondels
- B-side: "Tuck's Theme"
- Released: November 1969
- Genre: Pop; Rock; R&B
- Length: 2:18
- Label: Heritage
- Songwriters: Mark Barkan; Robert "Bob" Barash
- Producer: Jerry Ross

Music video
- ""Swingin' Tight" 7 single version" on Youtube.com

Music video
- "Swingin' Tight" Album slower version" on Youtube.com

Music video
- "Swingin' Tight" Keith & Billie version" on Youtube.com

"Swingin’ Tight" is an American pop/rock song, written by Mark Barkan and Robert "Bob" Barash.

The song was first recorded by the British duo Keith & Billie in 1966, but it was not until Bill Deal and the Rhondels released the song as a single in 1969 that it found widespread acclaim, making the US Billboard Hot 100, Cashbox Magazine Top 100 charts, and Record World 100 Top Pops.

== Versions ==
Keith & Billie

In 1966, the song "Swingin' Tight" found its way into the hands of the London-based music producer John Schroeder, who was working for Pye Records and oversaw their Piccadilly label. Piccadilly had signed Keith Powell and Billie Davis to partner on a number of songs, including "Swingin' Tight".

While the song was well-received, with one review lauding its "smoky, smouldering, almost Spectorish sort of production", it failed to make the UK charts and was never released in the United States.

Bill Deal and the Rhondels

In 1969, Jerry Ross was producing the Vintage Rock (HTS 35,003) album for Bill Deal and the Rhondels in New York at Bell Studios under his label, Heritage Records.

On March 10, 1969, the band recorded the song as a slower ballad that ran 2:56, and included it as the second track on the B side of the LP.

On October 3, 1969, a new version of the song was produced by Ross, who hired studio musicians to record the instrumentation, to which Bill Deal and the Rhondels laid down the vocals. This version had a more upbeat tempo and ran for only 2:18. It was released as a 7" single under the Heritage label (HE818) in November 1969. The record had "Swingin’ Tight" on the A-side and "Tuck’s Theme" on the B side.

This version made it to the US Billboard Hot 100, where it charted for five weeks, peaking at number 85 in December 1969. It also landed on the Cashbox Top 100 singles chart for six weeks, where it reached number 52, and spent six weeks on the Record World 100 Top Pops, where it peaked at number 51.

It also charted for 6 weeks on the Canadian RPM 100, peaking at #57 on December 13, 1969.

The single received an achievement award from BMI as one of the most performed rhythm and blues songs in its repertoire for 1969–1970.

Os Selvagens

In 1970, the Brazilian group Os Selvagens incorporated the song on their self titled Os Selvagens album (Epic-44057). The song was recorded in Portuguese under the title "Deixa Pra Lá" and was the sixth track on the A-side.
