= George "Honey Boy" Evans =

British entertainer

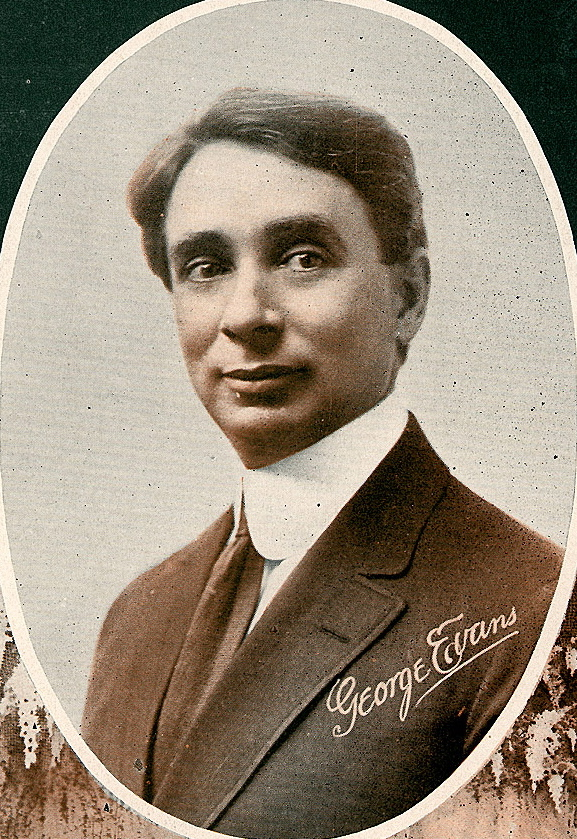
Evans on 1913 sheet music cover

George Evans (10 March 1870 – 5 March 1915) known as "Honey Boy" Evans was a Welsh-born songwriter, comedian, entertainer, and musician active in the United States in the late 19th and early 20th centuries.

== Biography ==
Evans was born in Pontlottyn, Wales in 1870. In 1910, he bought the Cohan & Harris Minstrels organization for $25,000, that were known as the Honey Boy Minstrels.

He was composer of "In the Good Old Summer Time"; Ren Shields was the Lyricist. He had a well known minstrel show troupe, the "Honey Boy Minstrels". He debuted The Memphis Blues on vaudeville.

Evans became a great baseball fan after moving to America as a young man. He spent two weeks in March 1908 with the Philadelphia Phillies at spring training in Savannah, Georgia where he stayed and practiced with the team and socialized with the players. The Phillies named their team of younger players the "Honey Boys" in intrasquad games against the regulars in honor of Evans.

Beginning in 1908, he commissioned a silver cup that he presented at season end to the "World's Championship Batsman", the player having the highest batting average in all of Major League Baseball. (Honus Wagner, the great Pittsburgh Pirate shortstop, won the initial award in 1908, after having been offered $10,000 per-year to come out of retirement. Ty Cobb swept the next 4 trophies from 1909 to 1912). Evans stopped issuing the award in 1913.

He died at Union Baptist Hospital in Baltimore of stomach cancer on 5 March 1915.

== Partial discography ==
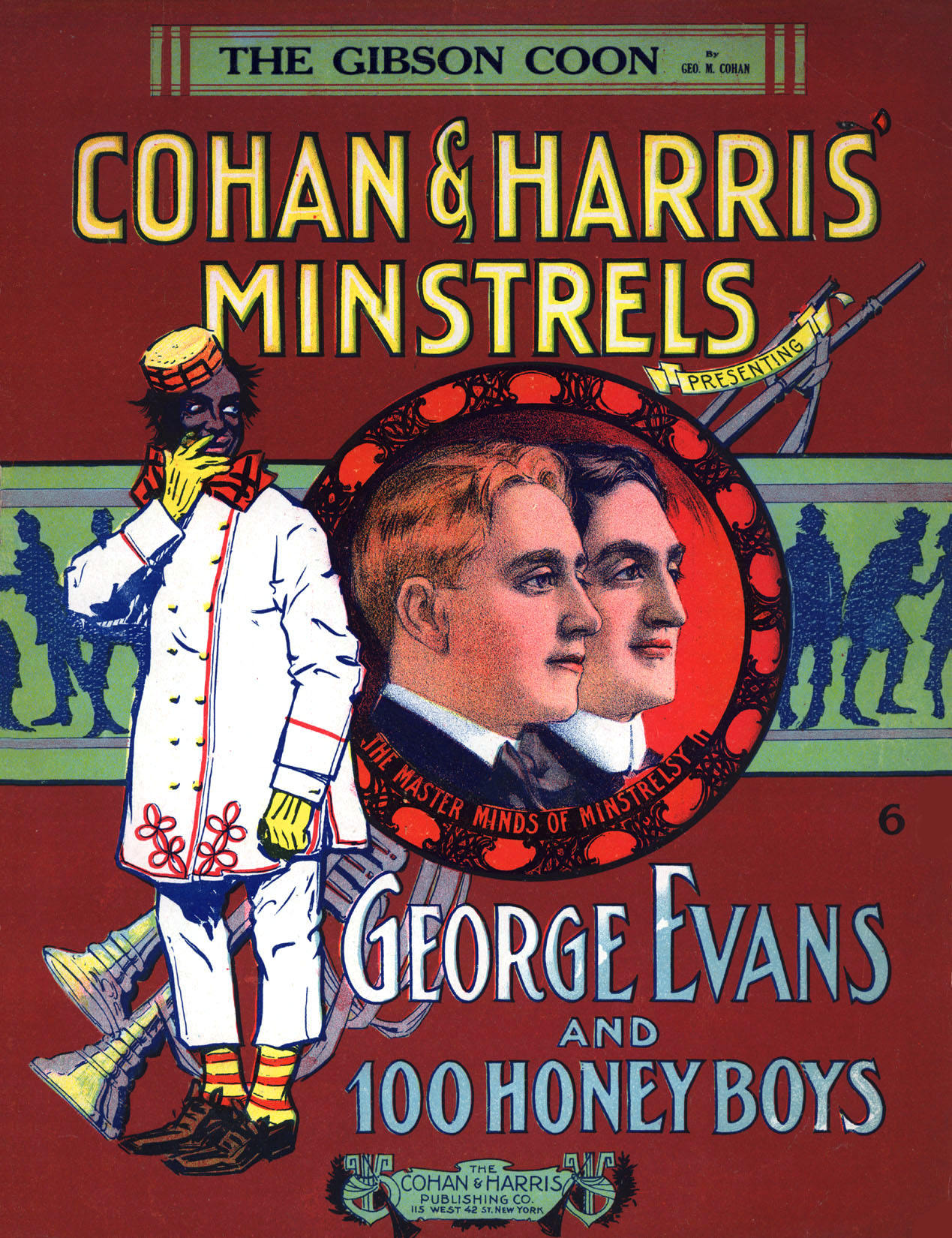
1908 sheet music cover depicting George M. Cohan and Sam Harris along with George Evans in blackface

=== Songs ===
- "In the Good Old Summer Time"
- "I'll Be True to My Honey Boy"
- "Come Take a Trip in My Airship"
- "Standing on the Corner Didn't Mean No Harm"
- "Down Where the Watermelon Grows"
- "Look out for the Hoodoo-doo-doo Man"
- "Jack o'lantern man"
- "When it's moonlight on the levee, Caroline"
- "O'Brien Has No Place to Go"
