= List of number-one singles of 1976 (Ireland) =

This is a list of singles which have reached number one on the Irish Singles Chart in 1976.

| Week ending | Song | Artist | Ref. |
|---|---|---|---|
| 3 January | "Bohemian Rhapsody" | Queen | |
| 10 January | "Bohemian Rhapsody" | Queen | |
| 17 January | "Bohemian Rhapsody" | Queen | |
| 24 January | "Bohemian Rhapsody" | Queen | |
| 31 January | "Mamma Mia" | ABBA | |
| 7 February | "Mamma Mia" | ABBA | |
| 14 February | "Mamma Mia" | ABBA | |
| 21 February | "Mamma Mia" | ABBA | |
| 28 February | "Mamma Mia" | ABBA | |
| 6 March | "Broken Promises" | Red Hurley | |
| 13 March | "A Glass of Champagne" | Sailor | |
| 20 March | "Dreamin' My Dreams" | Marianne Faithfull | |
| 27 March | "I Love to Love (But My Baby Loves to Dance)" | Tina Charles | |
| 3 April | "I Love to Love (But My Baby Loves to Dance)" | Tina Charles | |
| 10 April | "You Don't Have to Say You Love Me" | Guys 'n' Dolls | |
| 17 April | "Save Your Kisses for Me" | Brotherhood of Man | |
| 24 April | "Fernando" | ABBA | |
| 1 May | "Fernando" | ABBA | |
| 8 May | "Fernando" | ABBA | |
| 15 May | "Fernando" | ABBA | |
| 22 May | "Fernando" | ABBA | |
| 29 May | "Fernando" | ABBA | |
| 5 June | "Arms of Mary" | Sutherland Brothers and Quiver | |
| 12 June | "Arms of Mary" | Sutherland Brothers and Quiver | |
| 19 June | "Arms of Mary" | Sutherland Brothers and Quiver | |
| 26 June | "Arms of Mary" | Sutherland Brothers and Quiver | |
| 3 July | "Silly Love Songs" | Wings | |
| 10 July | "Silly Love Songs" | Wings | |
| 17 July | "The Boys Are Back in Town" | Thin Lizzy | |
| 24 July | "The Boys Are Back in Town" | Thin Lizzy | |
| 31 July | "The Boys Are Back in Town" | Thin Lizzy | |
| 7 August | "All My Roads Lead Back to You" | Brendan Shine | |
| 14 August | "Don't Go Breaking My Heart" | Elton John and Kiki Dee | |
| 21 August | "Don't Go Breaking My Heart" | Elton John and Kiki Dee | |
| 28 August | "Don't Go Breaking My Heart" | Elton John and Kiki Dee | |
| 4 September | "Don't Go Breaking My Heart" | Elton John and Kiki Dee | |
| 11 September | "Dancing Queen" | ABBA | |
| 18 September | "Dancing Queen" | ABBA | |
| 25 September | "Dancing Queen" | ABBA | |
| 2 October | "Dancing Queen" | ABBA | |
| 9 October | "Dancing Queen" | ABBA | |
| 16 October | "Dancing Queen" | ABBA | |
| 23 October | "Mississippi" | Pussycat | |
| 30 October | "Mississippi" | Pussycat | |
| 6 November | "Mississippi" | Pussycat | |
| 13 November | "I'll Meet You at Midnight" | Smokie | |
| 20 November | "Without You" | Nilsson | |
| 27 November | "Without You" | Nilsson | |
| 4 December | "If You Leave Me Now" | Chicago | |
| 11 December | "If You Leave Me Now" | Chicago | |
| 18 December | "If You Leave Me Now" | Chicago | |
| 25 December | "If You Leave Me Now" | Chicago | |

- 18 Number Ones
- Most weeks at No. 1 (artist): ABBA (17)
- Most weeks at No. 1 (song): "Fernando" - ABBA, "Dancing Queen" - ABBA (6)
- Most No. 1s: ABBA (3)

== See also ==
- 1976 in music
- Irish Singles Chart
- List of artists who reached number one in Ireland
