= Trio Galleta =

Trío Galleta
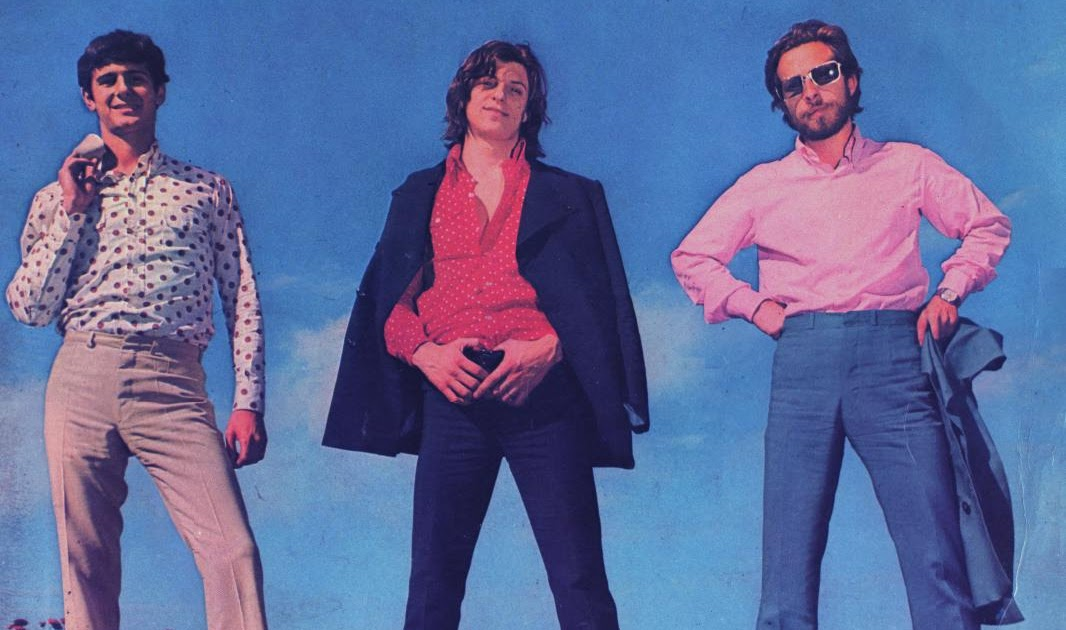

Background information
- Origin: Mar del Plata, Argentina
- Genres: Soul-rock
- Years active: 1969–1975
- Labels: Odeon Pops, RCA Vik, Odeon, EMI
- Past members: Carlos Iturbide; Juan Carlos Saporiti "Juancho"; Anibal Conte "Lolo"

Trio Galleta was a soul and rock band formed in 1969 in Mar del Plata, Argentina. It consisted of Carlos Iturbide (guitar, vocals), Juan Carlos "Juancho" Saporiti (drums) and Anibal "Lolo" Tell (bass).

== Background ==
In 1970, when the trend of singing in English language in Latin America had little acceptance, they released their first album, Estoy Herido, made only of cover versions. The project was made through Odeon Records. In 1971, they released an album titled Galleta Soul.

== Career ==
=== 1960s ===
The group recorded the single, "Rio Verde ("Green River") bw "Lodi" which was released on Odeon "Pops" DTOA 8512 in 1969. "Lodi" made its debut at no. 8 in the Billboard Hits of the World, Argentina chart for the week of 1 November. Two weeks later, their version of "Green River" debuted at no. 9 in the same chart. For the week of 29 November, "Green River" peaked at no. 7. For the week of 13 December, "Lodi" was at no. 2.

Trio Galleta recorded the single, "Estoy Herido" ("I've Been Hurt") bw "Nosotros Conseguiremos Mas Almas" ("We've Got More Souls") which was released on Odean "Pops" DTOA 8531 in 1969.

=== 1970s ===
For the week of 10 January 1970, "I've Been Hurt" had moved up from no. 4 to no. 3 on the Cash Box Argentina's Best Sellers chart. By 14 February, the record had moved down from no. 3 to no. 4.

It had been reported the previous month that with the group's version of "I'm Hurt" ("I've Been Hurt") becoming an overnight sensation, their label Odeon was also cutting their first LP.

For the week of 2 May 1970, Trio Galletta's version of "Venus" was at no. 4 on the Cash Box Argentina's Best Sellers chart. The group's self-titled LP was also at no. 8 in the Argentina's Best Sellers Top LPs chart.

In 1975 Iturbide formed a new quartet called Galleta, with Eduardo Sanz on guitar, Lito Olmos on bass, and Maria José on drums. Their album Galleta contained soul rock and hard rock. The album did not sell well.

== Later years ==
They influenced the Brazilian band the Fevers.

In the 21st century the band's songs continue to be re-recorded and concerts are made in their tribute.

== Discography ==
Albums Argentina Argentina or otherwise where indicated
| Act | Release | Catalogue | Year | Notes |
|---|---|---|---|---|
| Trio Galetta | Estoy Herido | Odeon Pops LDF 4402 | 1970 | |
| Trio Galleta | Galleta Soul | Odeon Pops SLDF 4427 | 1971 | |
| Trio Galleta | I Am So Happy | Odeon MOFB 451 | 1971 | Brazil release |
| Trio Galleta | Galleta | RCA VIK LZ-1302 | 1975 | |
| Trio Galleta | Trio Galleta | RCA Vik LZ-1530 | 1981 | |
| Trio Galleta | Aquel | EMI 4189 | ???? | Cassette |
| Trio Galletta | Estoy Herido | EMI 8 36137 2, Discos Pampa 8 36137 2 | 1995 | CD re-release |
