= Hey Girl Don't Bother Me =

Single by The Tams

from the album Hey Girl Don't Bother Me!
- B-side: "Take Away"
- Released: 1964
- Genre: R&B, soul
- Length: 2:25
- Label: ABC
- Songwriter: Ray Whitley

The Tams singles chronology
"Silly Little Girl" (1964)	"Hey Girl Don't Bother Me" (1964)	"It's All Right (You're Just In Love)" (1964)

Official audio
- "Hey Girl Don't Bother Me" on YouTube

"Hey Girl Don't Bother Me" is a popular single by American vocal group The Tams. Written by Ray Whitley, it was originally released in 1964 and reached number 41 on the Billboard Hot 100 and number 10 on the R&B chart. In Canada it reached number 21.

It later became a favourite on the Northern soul scene in the UK, belatedly reaching number one on the UK Singles Chart for three weeks in September 1971. The single was also number one on the Irish Singles Chart, for one week, the same month. The group performed the song on the BBC's Top of the Pops.

== Charts ==
Chart (1971)	Peak position
Australia (Kent Music Report)	87
Canada (RPM)	78
Ireland (IRMA)	1
United Kingdom (Official Charts Company)	1

== See also ==
- List of number-one singles of 1971 (Ireland)
- List of number-one singles from the 1970s (UK)
