= Where The 3 Counties Meet =

"Where the 3 Counties Meet"

Single by Brendan Shine
- B-side: "Bright City Lights"
- Released: 1973
- Recorded: 1973
- Studio: Eamonn Andrews Studios
- Genre: Irish traditional
- Length: 2:30
- Label: Play
- Songwriter: Patsy Farrell
- Producer: Bill O'Donovan

Brendan Shine singles chronology
"Far Too Young" (1972)	"Where the 3 Counties Meet" (1973)	"Abbeyshrule" (1973)

"Where The 3 Counties Meet" (also written "Where The Three Counties Meet") is a 1973 Irish traditional song by Brendan Shine.

== Lyrics ==
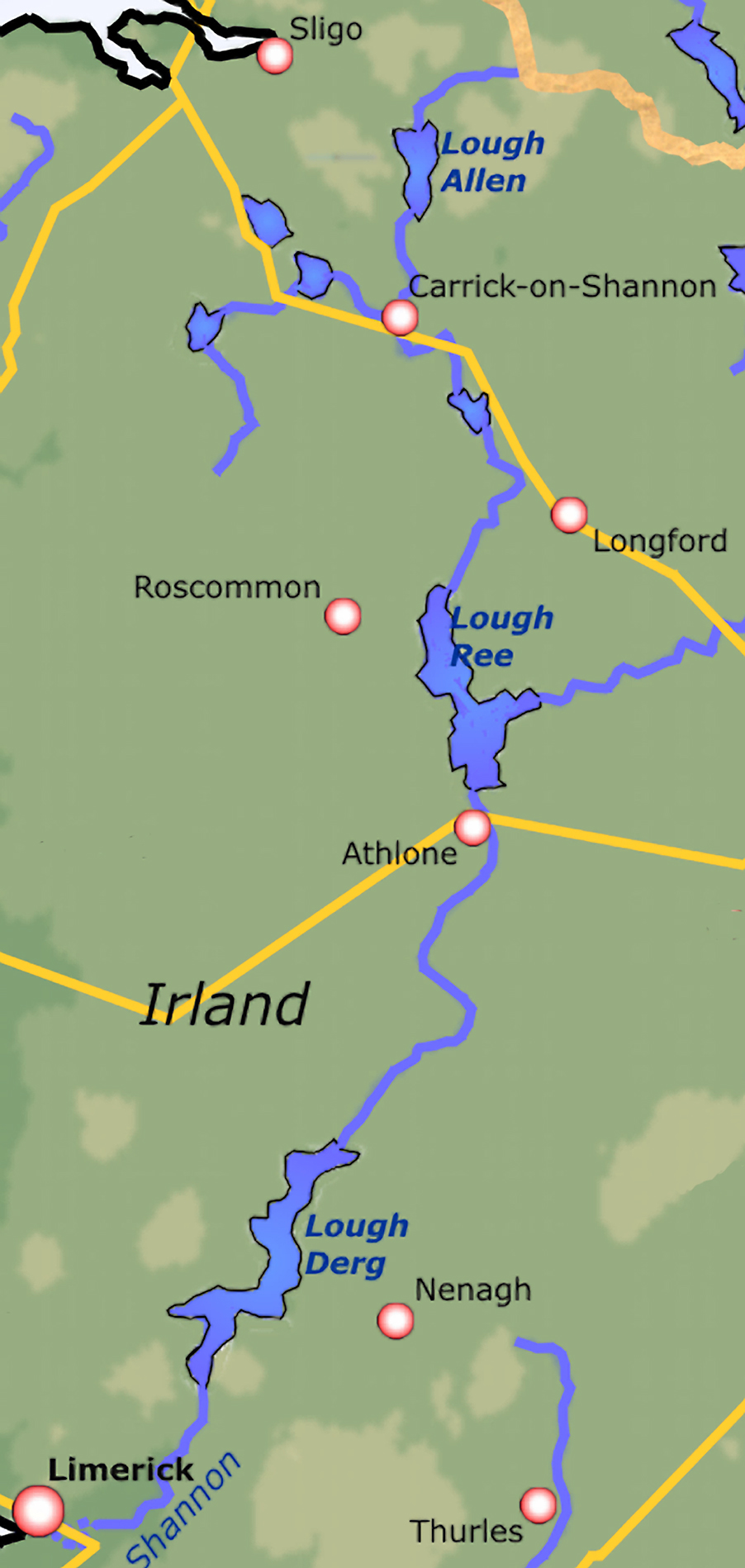
Map of Lough Ree and surroundings. County Roscommon is on the west bank, County Longford to the northeast and County Westmeath to the southeast.

The song is named for Lough Ree, where the three Irish counties of Longford, Roscommon and Westmeath meet at a tripoint. Also mentioned in the song are the towns of Athlone and Glassan, The Three Jolly Pigeons (a pub on the Athlone–Ballymahon road) and the River Shannon. The song is from the point of view of a member of the Irish diaspora, working in construction in a foreign land and longing to return home.

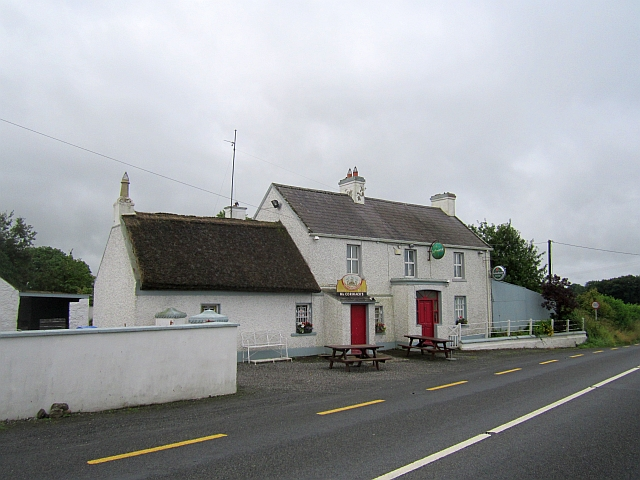
The Three Jolly Pigeons pub, located on the N55 road.

== Song history ==
"Where The 3 Counties Meet" was written by Patsy Farrell (1929–2002) of Rathowen.

"Where The 3 Counties Meet" was released by Brendan Shine in 1973, and was number one on the Irish Singles Chart for two weeks in August 1973. Spotlight magazine named it Record of the Year.
