= O'Brien Has No Place to Go =

Single by Brendan Shine
- B-side: "40 Miles from Poplar Bluff"
- Released: 1971
- Recorded: 1971
- Genre: Irish traditional, showband, country and Irish
- Length: 2:52
- Label: Play
- Songwriters: Stanley Murphy, George "Honey Boy" Evans
- Producer: Bill O'Donovan

Brendan Shine singles chronology
"The Maid With The Bonny Brown Hair" (1970)	"O'Brien Has No Place to Go" (1971)	"Sailor Boy" (1971)

"O'Brien Has No Place to Go" is an Irish traditional song written by Stanley Murphy with music by George "Honey Boy" Evans.

== Lyrics ==
The song is about a man named Dennis O'Brien who has three eligible daughters, all of whom are courted by young men.

== Song history ==
The song was written in 1908 by Stanley Murphy with music by George "Honey Boy" Evans.

A 1971 recording by Brendan Shine reached number one on the Irish Singles Chart. Shine received a silver disc for selling over 25,000 copies of the single.
