= Brendan Shine =

Irish folk and country singer (born 1947)

- Born: 2 June 1947 (age 79); Athlone, Ireland
- Genre: Irish folk
- Occupation: Musician television presenter
- Instruments: Vocals, accordion
- Years active: 1963–present

Brendan Shine (born 2 June 1947) is an Irish folk and country singer, television presenter and accordion player from Athlone. He has achieved 40 chart singles in Ireland and 5 Irish number one singles, and is best known for his songs about everyday Irish life, such as "Do You Want Your Old Lobby Washed Down" and "Spuds".

== Career ==
Shine originally started off as a barman. He set up a pub in Baylough in Athlone, across from St. Comans Park, calling it 'Shine's Bar' and it was run by his wife. Shine has recently sold the pub but the name 'Shine's Bar' remains. He now lives in Moore, on the main road to Shannonbridge, in an ordinary, old, two-storey farm house.

Shine has released more than fifty albums and has had over forty-five hit singles. He began his music career by playing in his father's country band while still at school, and also in Kieran Kelly's Ceili Band along with schoolfriend Johnny Dawson (who still performs with Shine in the Brendan Shine Super Band). He originally made his name as an accordionist before taking up singing and becoming one of Ireland's best-known entertainers. In 1971, he topped the Irish charts with "O'Brien Has No Place to Go", which stayed in the charts for five months.

In the 1970s, he recorded a few number one hits in Ireland. These included "Where the Three Counties Meet" (1973), "Abbyshrule" (1974), "All My Roads Lead Back To You" (1976), "How Much Time" (1977), and "Do You Want Your Oul Lobby Washed Down" (1979) which stayed at number one for six weeks and in the Top 50 for over 40 weeks. Shine performed this song to Pope John Paul II when the Pope visited Ireland.A 1986 single 'You'll Never Go Back' received much radio play despite not charting.

Shine has also presented several television series in Ireland, including Nice and Easy in the 1980s and Shine On as well as appearing on The Late Late Show. In the 1990s, he was a regular guest on The Lyrics Board and performed many of his songs on music shows and chat shows.

In 1998, he released his new single the "Celtic Tiger" which charted just outside the top 20. Shortly after that, his brother, and band leader, Owen Shine died while Brendan was on tour in the UK in Birmingham. Later that year, his daughter Emily Shine joined his band, and he won the World Country Award for the second year running.

In 2004, Shine was banned from driving in the UK for a year after pleading guilty to drink-driving.

In 2007, Shine released his major comeback hit "Grandad" which charted for four weeks in Ireland, peaking at number 24.

In 2009, Shine was subjected to another legal battle which he lost and was fined over €2000 for tax avoidance and failing to apply for income tax.

In 2010, Shine was awarded The Freedom of Roscommon Award (the highest civilian honour in County Roscommon) to recognise over 43 years of musical achievements. He is only the second person to have ever achieved this award.

Shine's latest album, Where Did You Meet Her was released on 16 April 2012, along with a DVD, Lily of the West.

== Discography ==
=== Albums ===
- Céili House (1973) – Play 1007
- This is Brendan Shine (1974) – Play 1009
- Country and Irish (1975) – Play
- Irish Startime (1978) – Irish Startime 4447
- Catch Me If You Can – Play
- The Irish Side of Brendan Shine (1980) – Pickwick
- Blue Misty Eyes (1982) – Play
- New Roads (1982) – Play 1012
- Simple Love Songs (1982) – Play 1014
- Brendan Shine – Play 1015
- Nice and Easy (1983) – Play
- My Old Country Home (1983) – Play 1017
- With Love (1984) – PlayTV2
- Moonshine (1986) – Play 1018
- A Picture of My World (1988) – Play
- Magic Moments with... (1989) – Stylus 991 – [UK #62]
- Always a Welcome (1992) – Avid
- I Wanna Stay with You (1995) – Carlton
- If You Ever Go Over to Ireland (1996) – Hallmark
- I'll Settle for Old Ireland: 18 Country & Irish Favourites (1997) – Hallmark
- Lovin' You (1999) – Avid
- Far Far Away (2003) – Avid
- Soft, Sweet and Warm (2003) – Blitz
- With Love (2004) – Am Cheoil – [UK #74]
- Shine on 21 (2004) – Am Cheoil
- Live at the Circus Tavern (2004) – Am Cheoil
- Live at Blazers (2004) – Am Cheoil
- At Home in Ireland: 18 Sentimental Songs (2004) – Am Cheoil
- At Home (2005) – Am Cheoil
- Dear Hearts & Gentle People – Pulse
- Like Father, Like Daughter – Intersound
- Irish Party Time – Beaumax
- Grandad (The First Time I Heard Him Say) & Other Family Favourites
- Seasons of the Heart (2008) – Pegasus
- Live at Thatch
- Rose of Castlerea
- Ultimate Country (2011)
- Where Did You Meet Her (2012) – [BEA #11]

=== Notable compilations ===
- The Best of Brendan Shine (1971) – Play 1001
- The Brendan Shine Collection (1983) – Play – [UK #51] [UK platinum album]
- Memories (1992) – PlayTV3 – [UK #81]
- The Very Best Of Brendan Shine (1998) – [Ireland #8]

=== Videos and DVDs ===
- Brendan Shine – White Star
- At Home In Ireland (2007) – Proper Music Distribution
- Shine On (2007) – Proper Music Distribution
- Live at Blazers (2007) – Proper Music Distribution
- Live at the Circus Tavern (2007) – Proper Music Distribution
- The Very Best of... (2007) – H and H
- Lily of the West (2012)

=== Singles ===
- "Treat My Daughter Kindly" (1967)
- "Ould Ballymoe" (1968)
- "High Germany" (1969)
- "Tumbling Water" (1970)
- "Sailor Boy" (1970) – Play – [Ireland #8]
- "A Bunch of Violets Blue" (1970) – Play – [Ireland #6] [Irish Folk Chart #1]
- "O'Brien Has No Place to Go" (1971) – [Ireland #1] [Irish Folk Chart #1] [Euro #23)
- "Where The 3 Counties Meet" (1973) – Play – [Ireland #1] [Irish Folk Chart #1]
- "I'm Little But There's Lots of Me to Love" (1974) – Play – [Ireland #5] [Irish Folk Chart #1] – (Brendan Shine Superband featuring Johnny Dawson)
- "Abbeyshrule" (1974) – Play 75 – [Ireland #1] [Irish Folk Chart #1] [Euro #18]
- "(Turn Out the Lights) Love Me Tonight" – Play 90 – [Ireland #11]
- "Suzie Brown" (1974) – [Ireland #20] – (with Johnny Dawson and Brendan Shine Superband)
- "Far Too Young" – Play – [Ireland #4] [Irish Folk Chart #1]
- "Dun Laoghaire " (1975) – Play – [Ireland #6] [Irish Folk Chart #1]
- "I'll Be Home" – Play – [Ireland #10]
- "Down the Wrong Road Again" – Play 93 – [Ireland #16]
- "All My Roads Lead Back to You" (1976) – Play – [Ireland #1] [Irish Folk Chart #1]
- "Christmas Time in Ireland" (1976) – [Ireland #5] [Irish Folk Chart #1]
- "How Much Time" (1977) – Play – [Ireland #2] [Irish Folk Chart #1]
- "Do You Want Your Oul Lobby Washed Down" (1979) – Play – [Ireland #1] [Irish Folk Chart #1] [Euro #25] [UK #54]
- "Catch Me If You Can" (1980) – Play – [Ireland #10]
- "Carrots" (1980) – Play 140 – [Ireland #10] [Irish Folk Chart #1]
- "I Believe in Marriage" – Play – [Ireland #18]
- "If the Shoe Fits" – Play – [Ireland #19]
- "Doogeens / Place in the Choir" (1981) – Play 141 – [Ireland #25]
- "Pub Crawl" (1981) – Play 143
- "Some Broken Hearts Never Mend" – [Ireland #5]
- "Hey! Louise" (1982) – Play 144 – [Ireland #20]
- "The Old Rugged Cross" (1982) – Play 145
- "Me Old Bone Shaker" (1982) – Play 146
- "My Old Country Home" (1982) – Play 147 – [Ireland #29] [UK #84]
- "Rose of Castlerea" (1982) – Play – [Ireland #16]
- "The Village Where I Went to School" (1983) – Play 148 [UK #105]
- "County Down" (1983) – Play 149 – [UK #78]
- "Thank God for Kids" (1983) – Play 150 – [Ireland #25] [UK #78]
- "Shine" (1983) – Play
- "Nancy Myles" (1984) – Play 151 [UK #124]
- "Now I'm Easy (Cocky Farmer)" (1984) – Play 152 [UK #182]
- "A Bunch of Violets Blue" (1984) – Play 153 [UK #135]
- "Song of the Myra" – Play – [Ireland #19]
- "Three Pubs in Bohola" – Play – [Ireland #14]
- "Can't Hold Back the Years" (1984) – Play 155 – [Ireland #30] [UK #189]
- "Only Our Rivers Run Free" – Play – [Ireland #24]
- Four Great Tracks (EP) – Spartan
- "Melody for You" (1985) – Play 203 – [Ireland #23] [UK #199]
- "You" (1985) – Play
- "Loneliness" (1986) – Play 206 – [UK #82]
- "You'll Never Go Back" (1986) – Play [UK #124]
- "My Son" (1986) – Play – [Ireland #14]
- "Moon Shine" (1986) – Play 214
- "Song for Maria" (1987) – Play 217 [UK #156]
- "Now I'm Sixty Four" – Play 234
- "The Bould O'Donaghue" (1987) – Play 240
- "Late Late Show" – Play – [Ireland #26]
- "If I Dream" – Play – [Ireland #18]
- "Do You Want Your Oul Lobby Washed Down (Remix Party Version)"
- "Me Uncle Mike" (1988) – Play – (Brendan Shine and His Outhouse Music)[UK #169]
- "Magic Moments" (1989) – Play – [UK #62]
- "Robinson's Ball" (1990) – Play
- "Rinka" (1991) – Play 258 – [Ireland #11]
- "Time Marches On" (1992)
- "I Wanna Stay with You" (1995)
- "One More Chance" – Play 272
- "The Celtic Tiger" (1997) – Play – [Ireland #21]
- "You'll Never Miss Your Mother" – Play – [Ireland #4]
- "Murphy's Dancing Pig" – Play
- "Maid with the Bonny Brown Hair"
- "March of the High Kings" – Play – [Ireland #8]
- "Shoe the Donkey"
- "Grandad" (2007) – [Ireland #24] [Irish Folk Chart #1]
- "Where Did You Meet Her" (2012)
