= Bill Deal and the Rhondels =

American pop band

- Origin: Portsmouth, Virginia, US
- Genres: pop, blue-eyed soul
- Years active: 1959–1983
- Past members: Bill Deal; Ammon Tharp; Rollie Ligart; Mike Ash; Mike Stillman; Byran Bennett; Al Shriner; George Bell; Joel Smith; Ronnie Hallman; Jackie Shelton; Bill Weaver; J.T. Anderson; Jimmy Alsbrook; David Williams; Ken Dawson; Kenny Copeland; Don Quisenberry; Roy Hines; Gloria Stephenson; Mike Kerwin; Perry Calligan; Tom Pittman; Ronny Rosenbaum; Gary Church; Bob Fisher; Jeff Pollard; Gary Hardy; Freddy Owens; Linda Green; Leon Barge; Howard Eaton; Wilson Rogers; Chatty Cooper; Gary Brown; Everett Hill; Marion Sledge; Alan Porter; Tom Cole; Bruce Burns; Ray Wilkes; Mark Maynard; Benny Bialy; Randy Pope; Dave Williams; Bernie Jacobs; Edgar Justice; Mike Robert; Chris Tennant; R.B. Sharp

Bill Deal & the Rhondels were an American pop band, formed in 1959 in Portsmouth, Virginia, crossing blue-eyed soul and beach music.

== History ==
William Franklin Deal was born in Portsmouth, Virginia to restaurant propietor Noah Deal, who died on January 1, 1951. His father was a guitarist who introduced Bill to music, and as a child he took piano lessons. Deal played in local bands while attending Woodrow Wilson High School, where he met drummer Ammon Tharp. Because they only knew a few songs, they would repeat songs during a gig, to which a friend joked they should call themselve The Rondels, a term in poetry for a short poem. Deal attended Old Dominion College, studying business administration.

They had three hit singles in 1969, "May I" (U.S. #39), "I've Been Hurt" (U.S. #35), "What Kind of Fool (Do You Think I Am)" (U.S. #23). Their single "Swingin' Tight" reached (U.S. #85) in December 1969. "Nothing Succeeds Like Success" reached (US #63) on the charts in the spring of 1970.

Ernest Frederick "Freddy" Owens joined the band after 1970 and served as lead vocalist as well as playing sax and bass. On March 4, 1979, he was robbed and shot dead by Jeremiah Carr at a Holiday Inn motel in Richmond, Virginia, where the band had a show earlier that evening. He had attempted to stop Carr from escaping after Carr raped his wife. Two shots wounded another band member, Chris Tennant, in the room. While Bill Deal kept going on with the Rhondels for another four years, he never really got over this incident and quit the music business in 1983.

Deal and Tharp reunited for one last gig at a nightclub in Virginia Beach.

In November 1995 Bill Deal and the Rhondels were among the first groups inducted into the Carolina Beach Music Awards Hall of Fame.

On June 6, 2003, the mayor of Portsmouth announced June 6 as "Bill Deal Day".

Deal married Janice Louise Burton in Perquimans County, North Carolina, in 1962. They had one son and one daughter. Their marriage ended in divorce, and in 1984 Deal married Barbara Jo Lerner. Deal died of a heart attack at his Virginia Beach home on December 10, 2003. He was cremated. Portsmouth city leaders declared February 2004 William F. "Bill" Deal Month, and the governor and the mayor of Virginia Beach recognized 19–23 May 2004 as Bill Deal Beach Music Weekend.

Original members of the Rhondels, sometimes called Bill Deal's Rhondels, continued to perform after his death.

Tharp died on September 22, 2017, aged 75.

== Members ==
- Bill Deal (born July 8, 1944, died December 10, 2003) – vocals, organ, electric piano, bass pedals (1959–1983)
- Ammon Tharp (born Ammon Chester Tharp on July 5, 1942, in Norfolk, Virginia, died September 22, 2017) – vocals, drums (1959–1978)
- Rollie Ligart – trumpet (1960–1962, 1965–1969, 1970–1971)
- Mike Ash – saxophone (1960–1961)
- Mike Stillman – saxophone (1960–1961)
- Byran Bennett – trumpet (1960–1961)
- Al Shriner – guitar (1960)
- George Bell – saxophone (1961–1975)
- Joel Smith – guitar (1961–1964)
- Ronnie Hallman – trumpet (1961–1963)
- Jackie Shelton – bass (1961–1963)
- Bill Weaver – saxophone (1962–1965)
- J.T. Anderson – guitar (1962–1965)
- Jimmy Alsbrook – drums (1962)
- David Williams – trumpet (1961–1963; 1975–1977)
- Ken Dawson – trumpet (1963–1970)
- Kenny Copeland – trombone (1963–1969)
- Don Quisenberry – bass (1964–1978)
- Roy Hines – vocals (1964–1966)
- Gloria Stephenson – vocals (1964–1966)
- Mike Kerwin – guitar, trumpet (1965–1978)
- Perry Calligan – guitar (1965)
- Tom Pittman – saxophone (1966–1969)
- Ronny Rosenbaum – trombone (1966–1971)
- Gary Church – vocals (1966–1967)
- Bob Fisher – saxophone, guitar (1969–1976)
- Jeff Pollard – trumpet (1969–1973)
- Gary Hardy – trumpet (1968–1969 & 1971–1976)
- Freddy Owens – saxophone, vocals (1971–1979)
- Linda Green – vocals (1971–1974)
- Leon Barge – percussion (1971–1973)
- Howard Eaton – trumpet (1971–1973)
- Wilson Rogers – saxophone (1972–1973)
- Chatty Cooper – percussion (1972–1973)
- Gary Brown – vocals (1973–1979)
- Everett Hill – trumpet (1973–1978)
- Marion Sledge – vocals (1973)
- Alan Porter – bass (1978–79)
- Tom Cole – drums (1980–1983)
- Bruce Burns – saxophone (1974–1977)
- Ray Wilkes – guitar (1974–1975)
- Mark Maynard – trombone (1974–1976)
- Benny Bialy – bass (1974)
- Randy Pope – guitar (1974)
- Dave Williams – trumpet (1975–1977)
- Bernie Jacobs – saxophone (1976)
- Edgar Justice – guitar (1977–1981)
- Mike Roberts – trumpet (1977–1981)
- Chris Tennant – trombone (1977–1978)
- R.B. Sharp – guitar (1978–1982)
- Tom Scott – drums (1978–1981)
- Ken Barringer – trumpet (1978–1979)
- Eddie Williams – saxophone (1978)
- Audie Stanley – bass (1979–1981)
- Wayne Kessinger – saxophone (1979–1981)
- Curtis Swisher – trumpet (1979–1981)

== Albums ==
=== Vintage Rock (1969) ===
Vintage Rock

Studio album by Bill Deal and the Rhondels
- Released: March 1969
- Recorded: July 1968
- Genre: Bubblegum pop
- Label: Heritage
- Producer: Jerry Ross

Singles from Bill Deal and the Rhondels
- 1. "May I" Released: August 1968; 2. "I've Been Hurt" Released: April 1969; 3. "Swingin' Tight" Released: November 1969

The material for this album was recorded in New York City between July 25, 1968 (May I) and March 10, 1969 (multiple), with the most tracks recorded at Bell Sound Studios on March 10, 1969. The "Swingin' Tight" track ("Swinging Tight" is often cited, but is not the official title spelling of the song. "Swinging Tight" is the title to the album released in 1980), first recorded March 10, 1969, is distinct from the similarly-named track on the second album, below and is a slow version of the song.

==== Track listing ====
A-side	B-side
1. "I've Been Hurt"; 2. "Touch Me; 3. "Hooked On A Feeling"; 4. "I've Got To Be Me"; 5. "Nothing Succeeds Like Success"; 6. "Soulful Strut"	1. "Hey Bulldog"; 2. "Swingin' Tight" (slow version); 3. "May I"; 4. "I'm Gonna Make You Love Me"; 5. "Are You Ready For This"; 6. "I've Got My Needs"; 7. "Change My Mind"

=== The Best of Bill Deal & The Rhondels (1970) ===
The Best of Bill Deal and the Rhondels

Studio album by Bill Deal and the Rhondels
- Released: 1969
- Recorded: 1968–1969
- Genre: Bubblegum pop
- Label: Heritage

Singles from The Best of Bill Deal and the Rhondels
- 1. "What Kind of Fool (Do You Think I Am)" Released: August 1969; 2. "Nothing Succeeds Like Success" Released: February 1970

The material for this album, which substantially overlaps the Vintage Rock album, was recorded in New York City between July 25, 1968 ("May I") and October 30, 1969 ("Harlem Shuffle"), with the most tracks recorded at Bell Sound Studios on March 10, 1969. The "Swingin' Tight" track, recorded on October 3, 1969, is distinct from the similarly named track on the first album, above and is a faster single edit version.

The album debuted on Billboard magazine's Top LP's chart in the issue dated April 11, 1970, peaking at No. 185 during a two-week run on the chart.

A-side	B-side
1. "What Kind of Fool Do You Think I Am"; 2. "Touch Me"; 3. "Harlem Shuffle"; 4. "May I"; 5. "I've Got My Needs"; 6. "Ain't Too Proud to Beg"	1. "Nothing Succeeds Like Success"; 2. "Swingin' Tight" (fast, single version); 3. "Hey Bulldog"; 4. "Are You Ready For This"; 5. "Tuck's Theme"; 6. "I've Been Hurt"

=== Singles ===
Year	Label	A-side	B-side	Chart positions		
Year	Label	A-side	B-side	USA	AUS	CAN
1968	Heritage	"May I"	"Day By Day My Love Grows Stronger"			18
1969	Heritage	"I've Been Hurt"	"I've Got My Needs"			18
	Heritage	"What Kind of Fool Do You Think I Am"	"Swingin' Tight"			14
	Heritage	"Swingin' Tight"	"Tuck's Theme"		80	57
1970	Heritage	"Hey Bulldog"	"I'm Gonna Make You Love Me"			
1972	Heritage	"It's Too Late"		108		
?	?	"Nothing Succeeds Like Success"			37	

== See also ==
- Trio Galleta
