= The Impalas =

American doo-wop group

- Origin: Brooklyn, New York
- Genres: R&B; Doo-wop
- Years active: 1958–1961
- Past members: Joe "Speedo" Frazier; Richard Wagner; Lenny Renda; Tony Carlucci; Toby Keller

The Impalas were an American doo-wop group in the late 1950s, best known for their hit, "Sorry (I Ran All the Way Home)".

The group formed in 1958 in Brooklyn, New York, and was composed of lead singer Joe "Speedo" Frazier (September 5, 1943 – April 1, 2014), Richard Wagner, Lenny Renda and Tony Carlucci. They were a racially integrated group—Frazier was the only black member.

They recorded for Hamilton Records and were found by songwriters Artie Zwirn and Aristides "Gino" Giosasi, who wrote the song "Sorry (I Ran All the Way Home)". In 1959 disc jockey Alan Freed heard the group, added his name as a writer of the song and got them a deal with MGM Records subsidiary label Cub. In the US, the record reached No. 2 on the U.S. pop chart, No. 14 on the R&B chart. Outside the US, "Sorry (I Ran All the Way Home)" peaked at No. 28 on the UK Singles Chart. The song sold over one million copies, earning gold disc status.

The group recorded follow-ups including "'Bye Everybody," "Oh What A Fool," an album for Cub, and one further single for the 20th Century label before disbanding in 1961. Frazier went on to sing with Love's Own in 1973, and in 1980 resurrected the Impalas as a touring act.

Joe "Speedo" Frazier died on April 1, 2014, at the age of 70.
