= Chicory Tip =

English pop group

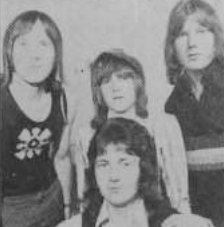

Background information
- Also known as: The Sonics
- Origin: Maidstone, Kent, England
- Genres: Pop, glam rock
- Years active: 1967–1975; 1996–present
- Labels: CBS, RCA
- Members: Peter Hewson; Richard "Rick" Foster; Brian Shearer
- Past members: Barry Mayger; Mick Russell; Rod Cloutt; Trevor price; Danny Rowlands; John Dunning
- Website: www.chicorytip.co.uk

Chicory Tip are an English pop group, formed in 1967 in Maidstone, Kent.

The band originally comprised vocalist Peter Hewson (born 1 September 1945, in Gillingham); guitarist Richard "Rick" Foster (born 7 July 1946); bass guitarist Barry Mayger (born 1 June 1946, Maidstone, died 14 January 2020 in Portugal); drummer Mick Russell who on getting married and moving to Wales was replaced in 1970 by Brian Shearer (born 4 May 1951, Lewisham, South East London); and guitarist and keyboard player from October 1972 Rod Cloutt (born Rodney Peter Cloutt, 22 January 1948, Gillingham, died in Australia October 29, 2016).

Chicory Tip released only a few records in the US. Their name was shortened to just Chicory for the U.S. market for their first two releases there, before they reverted to the full name.

== Career ==
The band formed in 1967, their name having been chosen by Barry Mayger who saw a coffee bottle (probably Camp Coffee) which contained chicory and this was shown on the label. He offered up the name Chicory Tip and it was accepted by the rest of the band. They were signed to CBS Records. They were originally known as The Sonics. The first few singles flopped, although "Excuse Me Baby" (a remake of a minor UK hit for the Magic Lanterns in 1971) secured the band its first appearance on the BBC music programme, Top of the Pops.

The group's greatest success came after their producer and manager Roger Easterby came across an advance copy of "Son of My Father", a song written by Giorgio Moroder and Pete Bellotte—Bellotte wrote English lyrics for Michael Holm's self-penned hit "Nachts scheint die Sonne" (which he sang) but Moroder wrote the music on the original as confirmed on the sheet music for the song. Convinced of its potential, he secured the option to rush record the group's own cover version in competition with the original. The result was a number one hit in the UK Singles Chart for three weeks in February 1972. It was one of the first hit singles to feature a Moog synthesizer, which in this case was programmed and played by studio engineer and record producer Chris Thomas, while in their appearance on Top of the Pops it was played by studio musician Trevor Bastow. The single sold over one million copies by July 1972, and was awarded a gold disc.

"Son of My Father" and "What's Your Name" were both recorded at George Martin's Air Studios.

Two further top 20 hits in similar vein followed, "What's Your Name", and "Good Grief Christina" which also managed number four in Norway. Another release, "Cigarettes, Women and Wine" was played on Radio Luxembourg but failed to chart in the UK, probably owing to a BBC Radio 1 ban because of its references to smoking; however, it did make the Norwegian charts at number eight. In between "What's Your Name" and "Good Grief Christina" was the single "The Future Is Past"; the B-side, "Big Wheels Rolling", showed a newer style and was the main reason why Rick Foster left the band (replaced by Rod Cloutt). When this single failed to chart, Chicory Tip went back to their trademark style again.

A further single co-written by Pete Bellotte (who wrote the lyrics) and Giorgio Moroder (who wrote the music) was released called "I.O.U." but failed to chart. One last attempt at the charts on CBS saw a change in the writing team after six singles all penned by Moroder/Bellotte. This time the hit songwriting team of Ken Howard and Alan Blaikley were used for the song "Take Your Time Caroline" but it too failed. The band released one more single, this time on Roger Easterby's Route label. It was the first single on Route and was called "Survivor". It was written by Zack Lawrence and J Weston. Lawrence was piano player on the hit "Groovin' With Mr Bloe" by Mr. Bloe.

The group released one album, also entitled Son of My Father. There were two versions released. "Excuse Me Baby" was the final track on side one in the early pressings, but when "What's Your Name" became a hit single, it replaced "Excuse Me Baby" on later copies. The album was never released on CD in the UK, but the Japanese import features all tracks plus many of the later recordings on CBS.

=== Disbandment and reformation ===
The group disbanded in 1975, but Peter Hewson (with newcomers John Wilson and Trevor Price) went back on the road for a short time, but split up. There were other versions of Chicory Tip without any of the originals until 1996 when three of the original hit makers, Foster, Barry Mayger, and Brian Shearer, re-formed the band without Peter Hewson, whose throat had given him problems.

Chicory Tip are still on the circuit with two original members, Foster and Shearer, with Mayger living in Portugal until his death. In 2000, Foster, Shearer and Mayger recorded the first new Chicory Tip product for 25 years. Chicory Tip in 2000 included versions of the three biggest hits as well as cover versions and medleys of popular hits by other acts.

Hewson recorded one single with Vince Clarke, "Take My Hand", in 1983 on the Reset label through RCA Records, but did not sing again. After the break-up of Chicory Tip, he ran a music club in Maidstone. Rod Cloutt lived in Australia until his death.

Roger Easterby and Des Champ were co-producers of the entire Chicory Tip catalogue. Easterby went into the horse racing industry after his music career ended. Champ died of cancer, aged 77, in 2006. The first member of Chicory Tip to pass away was Rod Cloutt, in Australia in 2017.

Although Chicory Tip made just one album, there were five official compilation CDs released outside Britain, and a "Best Of" vinyl compilation album in Sweden. The most comprehensive CD though is The Singles Collection, released by 7T's Records which contained all A- and B-sides ever recorded by the band. The label sourced the master tapes but the first single, "Monday After Sunday", used Rick Foster's own mint vinyl copy for the CD as the original tapes were lost. This 22 track collection did not include the other seven songs recorded by the band, but the Japanese CD of Son of My Father has them on. In 2019 7T's Records released "The Complete Chicory Tip" double CD containing all 30 songs by the band – 29 for CBS Records and the final single for Route Records.

The only other recordings made by Chicory Tip were BBC sessions in the early 1970s which included covers of "Kentucky Woman" (Neil Diamond), "Drinking My Moonshine" (Mayfield's Mule), "It's for You" (Three Dog Night), "I'm Gonna Make You Love Me" (Temptations & Supremes), "Light My Fire" (the Doors), "Gypsy" (Moody Blues) and "Walk Like a Man" (Four Seasons). It is thought that none of the sessions survived and were likely wiped clean with the tapes being used to record over due to shortage of tape at the BBC.

== Discography ==
=== Studio albums ===
- Son of My Father (CBS.S 64871, March 1972)

=== Compilation albums ===
- The Best of Chicory Tip (CBS, 1974)
- The Very Best (Castle Communications, 1995)
- The Very Best of Chicory Tip (Summit, 1997)
- The Best of Chicory Tip (Repertoire, 1999)
- The Singles Collection (7T's, 2011)
- The Complete Chicory Tip (7T's, 2019)

=== Singles ===
Year	Single	Chart Positions								
Year	Single	AUS	BEL (FLA)	BEL (WAL)	GER	IRE	NED	NOR	UK	US
1970	"Monday After Sunday"	-	-	-	-	-	-	-	-	-
1971	"My Girl Sunday"	-	-	-	-	-	-	-	-	-
1971	"Excuse Me Baby"	-	-	-	-	-	-	-	-	-
1971	"I Love Onions"	-	-	-	-	-	-	-	-	-
1972	"Son of My Father"	19	1	1	18	3	4	4	1	91
1972	"What's Your Name"	-	27	33	32	-	25	-	13	-
1972	"The Future Is Past"	-	-	-	-	-	-	-	-	-
1973	"Good Grief Christina"	-	19	49	49	-	25	4	17	-
1973	"Cigarettes, Women and Wine"	-	-	-	-	-	Tipparade	8	-	-
1973	"I.O.U."	-	-	-	-	-	-	-	-	-
1974	"Take Your Time Caroline"	-	-	-	-	-	-	-	-	-
1975	"Survivor"	-	-	-	-	-	Tipparade	-	-	-
