= Des Champ =

English musician and bandleader

- Born: Desmond Herbert Champ; 9 July 1928; London, England
- Died: 7 June 2006 (aged 77) London, England
- Genres: Rock, pop, electronic
- Occupations: Musician, bandleader, producer, arranger
- Instrument: Piano
- Years active: 1965–95
- Label: Santa Ponsa

Des Champ (9 July 1928 – 7 June 2006 in London, England) was a musician, bandleader, producer, and arranger.

== Background ==
In a musical career lasting over 35 years, Des gained notoriety in the British music business for his ground-breaking production and arrangement work in collaboration with partner Roger Easterby. Des first achieved chart success with Vanity Fare, whose "Hitchin' a Ride" sold a million copies in the US alone, but his most notable pop achievement was with glam-rock band Chicory Tip, whose "Son of My Father" featured a Moog synthesizer (a relatively obscure instrument at the time). "Son of My Father" went on to top the UK pop music charts for three weeks in early 1972 and was a seminal influence on 1980s synthesizer bands like ABC. Later in his career, Des worked as musical director for Shirley Bassey, 5000 Volts, and Tony Monopoly, before finally taking a regular day job with the Orchestration Department at BBC Radio 2.

== Career ==
=== 1960s ===
Working with producer, Sidney Des Champ was the musical director on the Barbara Ruskin composition "Love Can Be the Sweetest Thing" which was recorded by Valerie Mitchell. The song backed with "I'm Sorry" was released on Columbia DB 8186 in 1967.

It was mentioned in the 21 October 1967 issue of Billboard that Sounds Inc. were to have their first release on the Gentry label, a subsidiary of Polydor on the 27th of that month. Des Champ and Roger Easterby were the producers. The single, "How Do You Feel" bw "Dead As A Go-Go" was released on Polydor 56209.

Champ was the subject of the article, "A and R Man-Des Champ" appeared in the October 1969 issue of Beat Instrumental.

=== 1970s ===
It was reported by Billboard on 19 February 1972 issue that Chicory Tip's hit "Son of My Father" which Champ co-produced with Roger Easterby had reportedly sold 250,000 copies in three weeks.

Champ and Roger Easterby produced the Hello Girl album by Dr. Marigold's (a.k.a. Dr. Marigold's Prescription). The album which was released in 1973. The tracks included "She Belongs to Me" and "Lean on Me". The short review in the October issue of Dejay said that there was "Some bright energy and intensity going down" and "Good music all round". The group's version of Bob Dylan's "She Belongs to Me" was called raunchy while the version of "Lean on Me" was referred to as soulful. The reviewer said that it was well produced by Easterby and Champ. The single "Hello Girl" would become a hit in South Africa. Entering the chart on 15 March 1974, it spent sixteen weeks in the chart and stayed at no. 1 for two weeks.

== Death ==
He died of cancer on 7 June 2006 in London.

== Discography ==
Year	Title
1972	"Son of My Father"
