= The Tams =

American vocal group

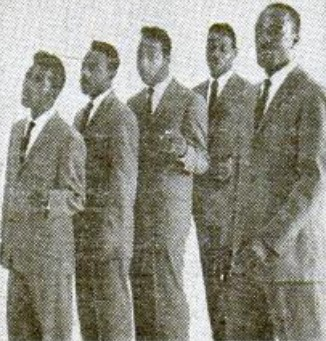
- The original lineup of The Tams in 1962. Left to right: Floyd Ashton, Joseph Pope, Horace Key, Robert Lee Smith, Charles Pope

Background information
- Origin: Atlanta, Georgia, U.S.
- Genres: R&B, soul, beach music
- Years active: 1960–present
- Labels: Arlen Records, ABC-Paramount, Probe, Virgin
- Members: Robert Lee Smith "Little Red" Cottle
- Past members: Albert Cottle; Joseph Pope; Horace Key; Floyd Ashton; Charles Pope
- Website: www.thetams.com

The Tams are an American vocal group from Atlanta, Georgia, who enjoyed their greatest chart success in the 1960s, but continued to chart in the 1970s, and the 1980s. Two separate lineups of the group continue to perform and record. One lineup, called 'The Original Tams with R. L. Smith', features original member Robert Lee Smith, and the other lineup is under the leadership of Little Red, the son of longtime member Albert Cottle, and stepfather Charles Pope and the nephew of group co-founder Joe Pope.

== Career ==
The original members were students at David T. Howard High School. The founding members were brothers Joseph and Charles Pope, Robert Lee Smith, Floyd Ashton and Willie J. Rutherford. Rutherford had problems on stage and was replaced by Horace Key early in the groups history. A story often told about the group was that they had sung in the 1950s as The Four Dots, but this rumour was debunked by Smith in 2015. They took the name the Tams from the Tam o'shanter hats they wore on stage.

In 1962, the group was discovered by Bill Lowery when they were singing in a hotel Smith managed. Their first recording was a hit single on Arlen Records. "Untie Me", a Joe South composition, became a top 20 on the Billboard R&B chart. In 1963, Ashton left and was replaced by Albert Cottle, who was from Washington, D.C..

The follow-up releases largely failed until 1964, when "What Kind of Fool (Do You Think I Am)", reached the top 10 on the US Billboard Hot 100. The song spent three weeks at number one on the Cash Box R&B chart. Many of their popular hits were written by Ray Whitley.

"Hey Girl Don't Bother Me" was also a modest US hit the same year. the Tams had only one further major US hit (in 1968) when "Be Young, Be Foolish, Be Happy", peaked at No. 26 on the US R&B chart, and subsequently made the UK top 40 in 1970.

Their 1965 recording "I've Been Hurt" was their biggest regional hit (based on sales and airplay) prior to 1980.

The group reached the Number one slot in the UK Singles Chart in September 1971, with the re-issue of "Hey Girl Don't Bother Me", thanks to its initial support from the then thriving UK Northern soul scene. The song also topped the Irish Singles Chart, making them the first African-American group to have a number-one single in Ireland. A performance of the song on Top of the Pops has since become well known due to member Horcae Key seemingly disappearing off stage mid-song.

By 1973, Key and Cottle had left, and two new singers, John Marshall and Joseph Jones, had joined.

American singer-songwriter Tameka Harris, born in 1975, is the daughter of Dianne Cottle-Pope and Charles Pope.

The group did not chart again until 1987, when their song "There Ain't Nothing Like Shaggin'" reached No. 21 in UK, propelled by a regionally-popular dance known as the Carolina shag, which featured heavily in the subsequent 1989 film, Shag. However, the track was banned by the BBC because the word "shag" means "to have sexual intercourse" in colloquial British English.

Still active in the Southeastern United States, they continue to record new music and perform live. In 1999, they were featured performers with Jimmy Buffett on his CD, Beach House on the Moon, and also toured with him around the country.

Because of financial reasons, the group split in the 1980s, with Charles Pope, Robert Lee Smith, and Horace Key leaving to form a new Tams, while Joseph Pope remained in the original. Two versions of the Tams continue to tour to this day: one still led by Smith, who is now semi-retired, and another led by "Little Red" Cottle, son of Albert Cottle.

Although the group members split up, both sides of the group, both original members and later additions to both groups, remained friends with one another, only they weren't on good terms when it came to the music business.

In a 2026 interview, Smith spoke of high regard of the Tams group led by Little Red, saying "These are the original Tams. But now we got we got a new Tams coming, which is just as good as the old Tams. They is on the scene. They doing one heck of a job on the scene. So, you know, the Tams name going to stand, right now it's Little Red and his Tams, but they still the Tams because you know Little Red has been with us from when he was five or six years old."

Charles Pope died from Alzheimer's disease on July 11, 2013, at the age of 76.

== Members ==
Founding/original members

- Floyd Ashton (born August 15, 1933)
- Joseph Pope (born Joseph Lee Pope, November 6, 1933, Atlanta, Georgia; died March 16, 1996)
- Horace Key (born April 13, 1934, Atlanta, Georgia, died 1995)
- Robert Lee Smith (born March 18, 1936)
- Charles Pope (born Charles Walter Pope, August 7, 1936, Atlanta, Georgia; died July 11, 2013)
- Albert Cottle (July 3, 1941 – February 11, 1982)

== Discography ==
=== Singles ===
Year	Title	Chart positions			
Year	Title	US	US R&B	AUS	UK
1962	"Untie Me"	60	12	—	—
1963	"What Kind of Fool (Do You Think I Am)"	9	1	—	—
1964	"You Lied to Your Daddy"	70	27	—	—
1964	"It's All Right (You're Just in Love)"	79	—	—	—
1964	"Hey Girl Don't Bother Me"	41	10	—	—
1964	"Find Another Love"	87	—	—	—
1964	"Silly Little Girl"	87	—	—	—
1965	"I've Been Hurt"	—	—	—	—
1968	"Be Young, Be Foolish, Be Happy"	61	26	—	32
1968	"Trouble Maker"	118	—	—	—
1971	"Hey Girl Don't Bother Me"	—	—	87	1
1987	"There Ain't Nothing Like Shaggin'"	—	—	—	21
1988	"My Baby Sure Can Shag"	—	—	100	91
"—" denotes releases that did not chart or were not released in that territory.

=== Hey Girl Don't Bother Me! ===
This was the group's first album in 1964. It has the single of the same name.

Hey Girl Don't Bother Me!

Studio album by the Tams
- Released: 1964
- Recorded: 1964
- Genre: Rhythm and Blues
- Label: ABC-Paramount

Singles from Hey Girl Don't Bother Me!
- 1. "Hey Girl Don't Bother Me" Released: June 1964; 2. "Silly Little Girl" Released: October 1964

Side One
No.	Title	Writer(s)	Length
1.	"Weep Little Girl"	Mac Davis	2:21
2.	"Go Away Little Girl"	Goffin-King	2:13
3.	"What Kind of Girl Are You"	Ray Whitley	1:55
4.	"Hey Little Girl"	Buddy Funk	2:31
5.	"Why Did My Little Girl Cry"	Harry Middlebrooks	2:11
6.	"Hey Girl Don't Bother Me"	Ray Whitley	2:25

Side Two
No.	Title	Writer(s)	Length
1.	"Silly Little Girl"	Joe South	2:36
2.	"Candy"	David-Whitney-Kramer	2:15
3.	"My Lady Elaina"	Judy Thomas	2:08
4.	"Melancholy Baby"	Morton-Burnett	2:21
5.	"She's Funny That Way"	Whiting-Clark	2:50
6.	"Anna (Go to Him)"	Arthur Alexander	2:45

=== Other albums ===
- 1964: Presenting the Tams
- 1967: Time for the Tams
- 1968: A Little More Soul
- 1969: A Portrait of the Tams
- 1970: Be Young, Be Foolish, Be Happy
- 1970: Best of the Tams
- 1982: Reminiscing
- 1982: Precious Moments
- 1983: Beach Music from the Tams
- 1999: Steppin' Out in the Light
- 2004: Comin' at Cha!

== See also ==
- List of artists who reached number one on the UK Singles Chart
- List of artists who reached number one in Ireland
- Beach music
- List of 1960s one-hit wonders in the United States

== Bibliography ==
- The New Musical Express Book of Rock, 1975, Star Books, ISBN 0-352-30074-4
